= Sky (Sky album) =

Studio album by Sky
- Released: 4 May 1979
- Genres: Progressive rock, classical crossover
- Length: 36:48
- Label: Arista/Ariola
- Producers: Sky, Haydn Bendall, Tony Clark

Sky chronology
Sky (1979)	Sky 2 (1980)

Sky is the debut album by the supergroup Sky, released in 1979.

The album was a chart success, reaching the top 10 in both Australia and the UK charts, and being certified Platinum in the UK.

In 2014 Esoteric Recordings started a schedule of remasters and expanded releases with this recording.

== Critical response ==
In a retrospective review, AllMusic portrayed the album negatively, saying "this album plods along with no apparent destination."

== Track listing ==
=== Original vinyl and cassette ===
Side one
No.	Title	Writer(s)	Length
1.	"Westway"	Herbie Flowers, Francis Monkman	3:37
2.	"Carillon"	Herbie Flowers, Ian Gomm	3:27
3.	"Danza"	Antonio Ruiz-Pipò; arranged by Kevin Peek	2:57
4.	"Gymnopedie No. 1"	Erik Satie	3:40
5.	"Cannonball"	Monkman	3:39

Side two
No.	Title	Writer(s)	Length
6.	"Where Opposites Meet""	Monkman	19:22

=== 1992 and 1994 CD releases ===
- 1992 : Freestyle Records (SKY CD 1), Music Club (MCCD077)
- 1994 : Nota Blu (9403200), Merlin Records

Bonus track
No.	Title	Length
7.	"Dies Irae" (Originally a non-album single)	7:31

The 1992 Freestyle Records split "Where Opposites Meet" into its component parts, whereas all the others combined them all into one track. All other CD issues up to and including the 2005 Sanctuary Records release only contained the original album.

The Merlin Records CD contained new artwork exclusive to that edition.

=== 2007 Arcàngelo double CD (ARC-7249/50) ===
Disc one – Sky
No.	Title	Length
1.	"Westway"
2.	"Carillon"
3.	"Danza"
4.	"Gymnopedie No. 1"
5.	"Cannonball"
6.	"Where Opposites Meet"

Disc two – Anthology
No.	Title	Length
1.	"The Grace"
2.	"Chiropodie No. 1"
3.	"Sister Rose"
4.	"Meheeco"
5.	"Keep Me Safe And Keep Me Warm, Shelter Me From Darkness"
6.	"Hello"
7.	"Connecting Rooms"
8.	"Westwind"
9.	"Masquerade"
10.	"To Yelasto Pedi"

All tracks on the second disc are taken from Sky 3 and Sky 4: Forthcoming

=== 2014 Esoteric Recordings CD and DVD ===
CD: Original album (remastered) with bonus tracks
No.	Title	Length
1.	"Westway"
2.	"Carillon"
3.	"Danza"
4.	"Gymnopedle No. 1"
5.	"Cannonball"
6.	"Where Opposites Meet"
7.	"Dies Irae" (Bonus track – originally a non-album single)
8.	"March to the Scaffold (original single version)" (Bonus track – originally the B side of "Dies Irae")
9.	"Where Opposites Meet (Parts 1 – 5) (Live)" (Bonus track (live) – The Year of the Child UNICEF concert at Wembley Arena, London, November 1979)

DVD: video recording of various live performances (NTSC / Region Free)
No.	Title	Length
1.	"Interview / Danza" (Musical Chairs – BBC TV – 7 March 1979)
2.	"Cannonball" (Pebble Mill at One – BBC TV – 22 May 1979)
3.	"Carillon" (Pebble Mill at One – BBC TV – 22 May 1979)
4.	"Cannonball" (Promotional film – Old Grey Whistle Test – 22 May 1979)
5.	"Danza" (Val Doonican Music Show – 29 May 1979)
6.	"Carillion" (Val Doonican Music Show – 29 May 1979)
7.	""Where Opposites Meet" (Parts 4 and 5) (live)"" (Live – The Year of the Child, UNICEF concert at Wembley Arena, London, November 1979)

=== 2015 Let Them Eat Vinyl double LP ===
Side one
No.	Title	Writer(s)	Length
1.	"Westway"	Herbie Flowers, Francis Monkman
2.	"Carillon"	Flowers, Gomm
3.	"Danza"	Antonio Ruiz-Pipò; arranged by Peek
4.	"Gymnopedie No. 1"	Erik Satie
5.	"Cannonball"	Monkman

Side two
No.	Title	Writer(s)	Length
6.	"Where Opposites Meet"	Monkman

Side three
No.	Title	Length
7.	"Dies Irae" (Bonus track)
8.	"March to the Scaffold (Original Single Version)" (Bonus track)

Side four
No.	Title	Length
9.	"Blank side"

== Personnel ==
- John Williams – acoustic guitars
- Francis Monkman – piano, synthesizer, harpsichord
- Herbie Flowers – bass guitar
- Tristan Fry – drums, percussion
- Kevin Peek – electric and acoustic guitars

== Charts ==
Chart (1979–81)	Peak position
Australian Albums (Kent Music Report)	10
New Zealand Albums (RMNZ)	38
UK Albums (Official Charts)	9

== Certifications ==
Region	Certification	Certified units/sales
Australia (ARIA)	Platinum	50,000^{^}
United Kingdom (BPI)	Platinum	300,000^{^}
^{^} Shipments figures based on certification alone.
