= Sky Five Live =

Live album by Sky
- Released: 14 January 1983
- Genre: Progressive rock
- Length: 96:11
- Label: Ariola
- Producer: Sky, Tony Clark, Haydn Bendall

Sky chronology
Sky 4: Forthcoming (1982)	Sky Five Live (1983)	Cadmium (1983)

Sky Five Live is a two-record album by Sky recorded live at The Comedy Theatre & The Concert Hall, Melbourne, Perth Concert Hall, The Festival Theatre, Adelaide and the Capitol Theatre, Sydney. It was mixed at Studio 3, EMI Abbey Road1, London and mastered by Nick Webb. It was released in January 1983 on the Ariola record label. Unlike most live albums, the majority of the tracks included on this release are new, with only four tracks having been previously released ("Dance of the Little Fairies", "Sahara" and "Hotta", all on Sky 2, and "Meheeco", on Sky 3), all of them in shorter and generally very different versions from the ones featured here.

In 2015, Esoteric Recordings continued a schedule of remasters and expanded releases with this recording.

== Track listing ==
Side 1 – 26:15

1. "The Animals" (Herbie Flowers/Steve Gray) – 20:56
2. "The Swan" (Camille Saint-Saëns, Arranged by Tristan Fry) – 4:36

Side 2 – 19:46

1. "KP I" (Kevin Peek) – 7:26
2. "Dance of The Little Fairies" (Herbie Flowers) – 4:33
3. "Love Duet" (Steve Gray) – 7:06

Side 3 – 27:20

1. "The Bathroom Song" (Herbie Flowers) – 2:48
2. "KP II" (Kevin Peek) – 3:36
3. "Antigua" (John Williams/Angus Trowbridge) – 3:55
4. "Sahara" (Kevin Peek) – 7:44
5. "Sakura Variations" (Kevin Peek/John Williams) – 7:56

Side 4 – 22:50

1. "Meheeco" (Herbie Flowers/Steve Gray) – 12:59
2. "Hotta" (Kevin Peek/Herbie Flowers) – 9:00

=== Esoldun 1995 two CD edition ===
CD 1: Original album
No.	Title	Length
1.	"The Animals"	21:27
2.	"The Swan"	4:52
3.	"KP I"	7:39
4.	"Dance of The Little Fairies"	4:47
5.	"Love Duet"	7:16
6.	"Carillion (bonus studio recording from Sky 1)"	3:28
7.	"Toccata (bonus studio recording Sky 2)"	4:41

CD 2: Original album
No.	Title	Length
1.	"The Bathroom Song"	3:22
2.	"KP II"	3:55
3.	"Antigua"	3:57
4.	"Sahara"	8:19
5.	"Sakura Variations"	8:00
6.	"Meheeco"	13:05
7.	"Hotta"	9:31
8.	"Chiropodie No. 1 (bonus studio recording from Sky 3)"	6:20
9.	"Fantasia (bonus studio recording from Sky 4 – Forthcoming)"	3:43

=== 2015 two disc reissue edition ===
CD 1: Original album (Remaster)
No.	Title	Length
1.	"The Animals" (2015 Digital Remaster – restored after the original single CD version omitted it.)	21:10
2.	"The Swan" (2015 Digital Remaster)	4:44
3.	"KP I" (2015 Digital Remaster)	7:36
4.	"Dance of The Little Fairies" (2015 Digital Remaster)	4:45
5.	"Love Duet" (2015 Digital Remaster)	7:16

CD 2: Original album (Remaster)
No.	Title	Length
1.	"The Bathroom Song" (2015 Digital Remaster)	2:59
2.	"KP II" (2015 Digital Remaster)	3:54
3.	"Antigua" (2015 Digital Remaster)	3:56
4.	"Sahara" (2015 Digital Remaster)	7:54
5.	"Sakura Variations" (2015 Digital Remaster)	8:09
6.	"Meheeco" (2015 Digital Remaster)	12:50
7.	"Hotta" (2015 Digital Remaster)	9:42

== Musicians ==
- Tristan Fry: Drums, Percussion (Premier Drum Kit, Müsser Marimba, Waterphone)
- Kevin Peek: Guitars (Gibson L5S, Fender Stratocaster, Ovation Classical, Ovation Folklore, AMD Digital delay unit)
- Steve Gray: Keyboards (Acoustic Grand Piano, William De Blaise 2 Manual Harpsichord, Yamaha GS1 Grand Synthesiser, Oberheim OB-Xa polyphonic Synthesiser, Korg 3XC Organ, Yamaha CS01/BC3 Monophonic Synthesiser ("Gobsynth"), Acoustic Piano/Roland JP8 interface system (used on 'Hotta' and 'Meheeco') and Harpsichord/Oberheim OB-Xa interface system (used on 'The Animals', 'Love Duet' and 'Dance of the Little Fairies': Developed by Andrew Jones)
- Herbie Flowers: Bass (Mrs. Flowers Basses, Old Blue Fender bass guitar with five-year-old black tape (nylon) wound Rotosound strings, String Bass)
- John Williams: Guitar (Takamine Hirade: model E9)

== Production ==
- Produced by: SKY, Tony Clark and Haydn Bendall
- Recorded by: AAV-Australia Pty. Ltd. Mobile Recording Studio.
- Sound & Lighting by: Jands Australia Pty. Sound & Lighting Systems.
- SKY Tour Promoters: The Paul Dainty Corporation & Clifford Hocking Enterprises.

== Charts ==
Chart (1983)	Peak position
Australian Albums (Kent Music Report)	16
Norwegian Albums (VG-lista)	23
Swedish Albums (Sverigetopplistan)	43
UK Albums (OCC)	14

== Certifications ==
Region	Certification	Certified units/sales
United Kingdom (BPI)	Silver	60,000^{^}
^{^} Shipments figures based on certification alone.
