= John Christopher Williams discography =

This is the discography for Australian-British guitarist John Christopher Williams. In the following list, compilations or re-editions are denoted by (C) after the album title.

== 1950s ==
- 1958 Guitar Recital Volumes 1 & 2 (Delysé)

== 1960s ==
- 1961 Folk Songs (with Wilfred Brown: tenor) (L'Oiseau-Lyre)
- 1961 A Spanish Guitar (Westminster)
- 1963 Twenty Studies for Guitar (Westminster)
- 1963 Jacqueline du Pré: Recital (EMI)
- 1964 CBS [Columbia] Records Presents John Williams (CBS)
- 1965 Virtuoso Music for Guitar (CBS)
- 1965 Two Guitar Concertos (Rodrigo and Castelnuovo-Tedesco) (CBS)
- 1967 More Virtuoso Music for Guitar (CBS)
- 1968 Two Guitar Concertos (Rodrigo and Dodgson) (CBS)
- 1968 Haydn and Paganini (CBS)
- 1969 Virtuoso Variations for Guitar (CBS)
- 1969 Concertos by Vivaldi and Giuliani (CBS)
- 1969 Songs for Voice and Guitar (CBS)

== 1970s ==
- 1970 John Williams Plays Spanish Music (CBS)
- 1970 Webern: Complete Works (CBS/Philips)
- 1971 Songs of Freedom – Theodorakis with Maria Farantouri (CBS)
- 1971 The Raging Moon (EMI)
- 1971 200 Motels (United Artists)
- 1971 Changes (Cube Records, Fly Records in the UK)
- 1971 Music for Guitar and Harpsichord (CBS)
- 1971 Cavatina (C) (Cube Records)
- 1972 Guitar Recital (I & II) (C) (Ace of Diamonds)
- 1972 Together (a.k.a. Julian and John) (with Julian Bream) (RCA)
- 1972 Gowers Chamber Concerto, Scarlatti Sonatas (CBS)
- 1972 Previn and Ponce Concertos (CBS)
- 1972 Greatest Hits-The Guitar (C) (Columbia)
- 1972 John Williams Plays More Spanish Music and Other Favourites (C) (CBS)
- 1973 Music from England, Japan, Brazil, Venezuela, Argentina and Mexico (CBS)
- 1973 The Height Below (Cube Records)
- 1974 Rhapsody (CBS)
- 1974 Together Again (a.k.a. Julian and John 2) (with Julian Bream) (RCA)
- 1974 Rodrigo & Villa-Lobos (CBS)
- 1974 John Williams' Greatest Hits (C) (CBS)
- 1974 Schoenberg: Complete Works for Chamber Ensemble (Decca)
- 1975 Bach: Complete Lute Music (CBS)
- 1976 Best Friends (with Cleo Laine)(RCA)
- 1976 Duos (CBS)
- 1976 John Williams and Friends (CBS)
- 1976 Villa-Lobos and Scarlatti (C) (CBS)
- 1977 The Sly Cormorant Argo (Decca)
- 1977 John Williams Plays Patrick Gowers (C) (CBS)
- 1977 Duos by Paganini and Giuliani (CBS) (with Itzhak Perlman, violin)
- 1977 John Williams plays Spanish Favourites (C) (Decca)
- 1977 John Williams plays Bach and Scarlatti (C) (Decca)
- 1977 Guitar Recital (Double LP) (C) (Decca)
- 1977 Castelnuovo-Tedesco, Arnold and Dodgson Concertos (CBS)
- 1977 John Williams ~ Barrios (CBS)
- 1977 Mermaid Frolics (Polydor)
- 1978 Malcolm Arnold and Leo Brouwer Concertos (CBS)
- 1978 Stevie (CBS)
- 1978 John Williams Plays Paganini (C) (CBS)
- 1978 John Williams Collection (C) (CBS)
- 1978 Travelling (Cube Records)
- 1978 Manuel Ponce (CBS)
- 1979 John Williams plays Stephen Dodgson (C) (CBS)
- 1979 Julian Bream & John Williams Live (RCA)
- 1979 Recollections (C) (CBS)
- 1979 Sky (Ariola)
- 1979 The Secret Policeman's Ball (Island). Various artists; Williams featured on track "Cavatina"
- 1979 The Deer Hunter (Capitol)
- 1979 John Williams at His Best (C) (Neon)
- 1979 Morning Sky (C) (Cube Records)
- 1979 Bridges (C) (Lotus Music/K-Tel)
- 1979 Spotlight on John Williams (2LP) (C) (Cube Records)

== 1980s ==
- 1980 The Monster Club (soundtrack)
- 1980 Guitar Quintets (CBS)
- 1980 The Platinum Collection (2LP) (C) (Cube Records)
- 1980 The Guitar Music of John Williams (C) (Tellydisc)
- 1980 Sky 2 (Ariola)
- 1981 Echoes of Spain – Albeniz (CBS)
- 1981 Sky 3 (Ariola)
- 1981 Great Performances: Rodrigo - Concierto de Aranjuez / Fantasia Para un Gentilhombre (C) (CBS)
- 1982 John Williams and Peter Hurford Play Bach (CBS)
- 1982 Sky Forthcoming (Ariola)
- 1982 Just Guitars: A Concert in Aid of The Samaritans (CBS)
- 1982 Portrait of John Williams (CBS/Sony)
- 1983 Sky Five Live (Ariola)
- 1983 The Honorary Consul Island (single)
- 1983 Let the Music Take You (with Cleo Laine) (CBS/QNote)
- 1983 The Guitar is the Song: A Folksong Collectio (CBS/Sony)
- 1983 Cadmium ... (Ariola)
- 1984 Rodrigo (CBS)
- 1985 Bach, Handel, Marcello: Concertos (CBS/Sony)
- 1985 Hounds of Love (EMI Manhattan)
- 1986 Echoes of London (CBS)
- 1986 Classic Aid: Concert in Aid of The UNHCR (CBS)
- 1986 The Essential Collection (C) (Castle)
- 1986 Le Grand Classique (C) (CBS/Guy Laroche)
- 1987 Emma's War (Filmtrax)
- 1987 Paul Hart Concerto for Guitar and Jazz Orchestra (CBS/Sony)
- 1987 Fragments of a Dream CBS/ (Sony)
- 1987 Unforgettable John Williams (C) (Castle)
- 1988 A Fish Called Wanda (Milan)
- 1988 The Baroque Album (CBS/Sony)
- 1988 John Williams – The Collection (C) (Castle)
- 1989 Spirit of the Guitar: Music of the Americas (CBS/Sony)
- 1989 The Great Guitar Concertos (2CD) (C) (CBS)
- 1989 Spanish Guitar Favourites (C) CBS
- 1989 Guitar Concertos (2CD) (C) (CBS)
- 1989 Rodrigo Concertos (C) (CBS)
- 1989 Rodrigo and Albéniz (C) (CBS)
- 1989 The Golden Guitar (C) (CBS)

== 1990s ==
- 1990 Leyenda (with Inti Illimani and Paco Peña) (CBS)
- 1990 Bach: Four Lute Suites (C) (CBS)
- 1990 Vivaldi Concertos (Sony)
- 1990 Spanish Guitar Music (C) (Essential Classics)
- 1991 Guitar Recital (C) (Decca)
- 1991 Latin American Guitar Music by Barrios and Ponce (C) (Essential Classics)
- 1991 Rodrigo, Giuliani and Vivaldi (C) (Essential Classics)
- 1991 The Best of John Williams (C) Music Club
- 1992 Takemitsu (Sony)
- 1992 Iberia (Sony)
- 1993 The Seville Concert (Sony)
- 1993 Together Again (Expanded Edition on CD) (RCA)
- 1993 Together (Expanded Edition on CD) (RCA)
- 1994 From Australia (Sony)
- 1994 The Great Paraguayan (From the Jungles of Paraguay) (Sony)
- 1994 Julian Bream and John Williams Ultimate Collection (C) (BMG)
- 1995 George Martin presents the Medici Quartet (Classic FM)
- 1996 The Mantis & the Moon (Sony)
- 1996 Guitar Concertos by Richard Harvey (Concerto Antico) and Steve Gray (Sony)
- 1996 Dodgson and Rodrigo (C) (Essential Classics)
- 1996 Guitar Recital - Paganini, Scarlatti, Giuliani & Villa-Lobos (C) (Essential Classics)
- 1996 Bach Lute Music: Volume 1 (C) (Essential Classics)
- 1996 Bach Lute Music: Volume 2 (C) (Essential Classics)
- 1996 John Williams Plays the Movies (and The World of John Williams) (Sony)
- 1997 The Black Decameron (Sony)
- 1997 The Very Best of John Williams (C) (Crimson)
- 1997 Great Expectations (Atlantic)
- 1998 In My Life (MCA)
- 1998 The Guitarist (Sony)
- 1999 Spanish Guitar Favourites (C) (Decca)
- 1999 Bach and Scarlatti (C) (Belart)
- 1999 Guitar Moods (C) (Decca)
- 1999 Great Performances – Rodrigo (C) (Sony)
- 1999 Schubert and Giuliani (Sony)
- 1999 The Prayer Cycle (Sony)
- 1999 When Night Falls (Sony)
- 1999 Plague and the Moonflower (Altus)

== 2000s ==
- 2000 Classic Williams – Romance of the Guitar (C) (Sony)
- 2000 The Essential John Williams (C) (Metro)
- 2000 English Guitar Music (C) (Essential Classics)
- 2001 The Magic Box (Sony)
- 2001 John Williams Plays Bach (C) (Sony) "Music For You"
- 2001 Invocación Y Danza (C) (Sony)
- 2001 Perpetual Motion (Sony)
- 2003 The Guitarist (Expanded Edition) (Sony)
- 2003 The Seville Concert (Expanded Edition) (Sony)
- 2003 El Diablo Suelto – Guitar Music of Venezuela (with Alfonso Montes) (Sony)
- 2004 Rosemary and Thyme (Sanctuary Classics)
- 2004 The Ultimate Guitar Collection (2CD) (C) (Sony)
- 2005 Bryn Terfel: Simple Gifts (Deutsche Grammophon)
- 2005 The Essential John Williams (2CD) (C) (Metro)
- 2005 Testament (BBC/Testament)
- 2006 Great Performances – Bach Lute Suites (C) (Sony)
- 2006 John Williams & John Etheridge: Places Between (Sony)
- 2008 Pure Acoustic (West One Music)
- 2008 From a Bird (JCW Recordings, JCW1)

== 2010s ==
- 2011 The Guitarist (3CD)
- 2013 Stepping Stones (JCW Recordings, JCW2)
- 2014 Concerto (JCW Recordings, JCW3)
- 2016 John Williams The Guitarist - The Complete Columbia Album Collection (58CD and 1 DVD)
- 2016 John Williams The Guitar Master (2CD)
- 2017 On the Wing (JCW Recordings, JCW4)
- 2018 The Flower of Cities; The Light on the Edge (JCW Recordings, JCW5)
- 2019 Vivaldi, Etc.! (JCW Recordings, JCW6)

== 2020s ==
- 2023 Paseo (JCW Recordings, JCW7)
