= Cadmium (album) =

Studio album by Sky
- Released: 25 November 1983
- Genre: Progressive rock
- Length: 48:09
- Label: Ariola
- Producer: Sky, Tony Clark, Haydn Bendall

Sky chronology
Sky Five Live (1983)	Cadmium (1983)	Masterpieces (1984)

Cadmium (stylized "cadmium…") is the fifth studio album by the progressive-classical rock band Sky, released in November 1983. The album contents were a mixture of Sky traditions and new elements – it contained a classical-rock arrangement of Prokofiev's "Sleigh Ride" (from the "Lieutenant Kijé Suite"), alongside seven original compositions and the first examples of commissioned compositions from contemporary writers from outside the band (in this case, Kevin Peek's old friend and fellow Cliff Richard collaborator Alan Tarney, who provided two original tunes). The colour of the album cover is primarily cadmium yellow, a pigment used by painters.

In February 1984, John Williams parted company with Sky, returning to a full-time classical career. Williams had previously hinted that his work with Sky had been intended as a five-year stint. In 2015, Esoteric Recordings continued a schedule of remasters and expanded releases with this recording.

== Track listing ==
Side 1

1. "Troika" (Sergei Prokofiev/Auth. Arr. Tristan Fry) – 3:00
2. "Fayre" (Kevin Peek) – 3:07
3. "A Girl in Winter" (Alan Tarney) – 3:30
4. "Mother Russia" (Steve Gray) – 6:53
5. "Telex From Peru" (Herbie Flowers) – 8:10

Side 2

1. "The Boy From Dundee" (Herbie Flowers) – 5:21
2. "Night" (Kevin Peek) – 3:54
3. "Then & Now" (Tristan Fry) – 3:25
4. "Return to Me" (Alan Tarney) – 3:50
5. "Son of Hotta" (Steve Gray) – 6:59

=== 2015 two disc reissue edition ===
CD: Original album (Remaster)
No.	Title	Length
1.	"Troika" (2015 Digital Remaster)	2.58
2.	"Fayre" (2015 Digital Remaster)	3.09
3.	"A Girl in Winter" (2015 Digital Remaster)	3.36
4.	"Mother Russia" (2015 Digital Remaster)	6.57
5.	"Telex From Peru" (2015 Digital Remaster)	8.11
6.	"The Boy From Dundee" (2015 Digital Remaster)	5.32
7.	"Night" (2015 Digital Remaster)	4.08
8.	"Then & Now" (2015 Digital Remaster)	3.21
9.	"Return to Me" (2015 Digital Remaster)	3.38
10.	"Son of Hotta" (2015 Digital Remaster)	7.09
11.	"Troika" (Bonus – extended edition)	4.04
12.	"Why Don't We" (Bonus)	4.24
13.	"The Fool on the Hill" (Bonus)	2.49

DVD: Video recording (NTSC / Region Free)
No.	Title	Length
1.	"Toccata" (Sky at Drury Lane – December 1983)
2.	"KP II" (Sky at Drury Lane – December 1983)
3.	"Oh Little One / Courons A La Fete" (Sky at Drury Lane – December 1983)
4.	"Troika" (Sky at Drury Lane – December 1983)
5.	"Rags and Bones" (Sky at Drury Lane – December 1983)
6.	"When the Branch is Green" (Sky at Drury Lane – December 1983)
7.	"Telex From Peru" (Sky at Drury Lane – December 1983)
8.	"Tuba Smarties" (Sky at Drury Lane – December 1983)
9.	"Son of Hotta" (Sky at Drury Lane – December 1983)
10.	"Carillon" (Sky at Drury Lane – December 1983)
11.	"Troika" (The Val Doonican Christmas Show – Broadcast by BBC TV on 24 December 1983)

== Musicians ==
- Tristan Fry – Drums (Premier), Percussion (Sleigh Bells, Latin Percussion), Besson B Flat Trumpet with cup mute.
- Kevin Peek – Guitars (Gibson L5S, Fender Stratocaster).
- Steve Gray – Keyboards (William De Blaise Harpsichord, Roland Jupiter-8, Yamaha DX-7, Synton Syrinx, Oberheim OB-Xa, Roland Juno-60, Yamaha CS 01 – BC1 ("Gobsynth"), Steinway grand piano, Harpsichord/OBX A – Piano/JP8 (Interface developed by Andrew Jones)).
- Herbie Flowers – Bass (Fender Jazz Bass, Old English String Bass)
- John Williams – Guitars (Takamine 15E, Greg Smallman Classical).

== Production ==
- Produced by: SKY, Tony Clark and Haydn Bendall
- Engineered by: Tony Clark
- Recorded with Mobile 1 Recording Studio and at EMI Abbey Road Studio Three.
- Mixed at: EMI Abbey Road Studio Three.
- Mastered by: Chris Blair
- Management: Peter Lyster-Todd
- Art Direction: Nick Marchant
- Design: Torchlight, London

== Charts ==
Chart (1983–84)	Peak position
Australian Albums (Kent Music Report)	30
Swedish Albums (Sverigetopplistan)	45
UK Albums (OCC)	44

== Certifications ==
Region	Certification	Certified units/sales
United Kingdom (BPI)	Silver	60,000^{^}
^{^} Shipments figures based on certification alone.
