= Tarney/Spencer Band =

English-Australian rock band

- Origin: London, England, United Kingdom
- Genres: Rock
- Years active: 1975–1979
- Labels: Bradley's, A&M
- Past members: Trevor Spencer; Alan Tarney

The Alan Tarney and Trevor Spencer band were an English-Australian rock band formed in London in 1975. Both had been in Australian bands, including James Taylor Move, prior to relocating to the United Kingdom, where they formed the duo. The group issued three albums, Tarney and Spencer (1976), Three's a Crowd (1978) and Run for Your Life (1979). Their single, "No Time to Lose" (1979), received airplay in the United States on album-oriented rock radio stations. It charted on the Billboard Hot 100 in both 1979 and again in 1981 upon re-issue. By the end of 1979, Tarney/Spencer Band had broken up and both founders undertook careers as songwriters, session musicians and record producers.

== 1967–1974: Early years: before formation ==
Future founding mainstay members of Tarney/Spencer Band, Trevor Spencer and Alan Tarney, met in Adelaide as members of the Hurricanes. Later they were members of Johnny Broome and The Handels, an R&B group, then the Vectormen and, in 1967, James Taylor Move, a psychedelic pop and progressive rock band. For that group Spencer provided drums and Tarney was on organ; bandmates included Kevin Peek on guitar (also ex-the Hurricanes, Johnny Broome and the Handels). In 1968 Peek, Spencer and Tarney formed the Kevin Peek Trio as a jazz group and relocated to the United Kingdom in the following year.

In 1969, Terry Britten (ex-the Hurricanes, The Twilights, when living in Adelaide) joined the trio on guitar, in London, to form Quartet, which released two singles, "Now" (December 1969) and "Joseph" (May 1970) on the Decca label and recorded a 13-track unreleased album. The group disbanded later that year. In 1973 Britten, Spencer, Tarney and Australian-born John Farrar (ex-the Strangers) on lead guitar, were the backing band for Cliff Richard on his Eurovision Song Contest 1973 entry, "Power to All Our Friends".

While Spencer and Tarney were still members of Quartet, they worked as session musicians for Richard; Tarney joined the Shadows on bass guitar in 1973 and stayed until 1977. Spencer and Tarney also worked for other artists including Hank Marvin, Olivia Newton-John, Chris Squire, Bonnie Tyler, Charlie Dore, New Seekers, Peter Doyle, and the Real Thing.

== 1975–1979: Band history ==
Tarney/Spencer Band formed as a rock music duo in London in 1975 with Spencer on drums and percussion and backing vocals; and Tarney on lead vocals, guitars (lead, rhythm and bass), synthesisers and keyboards. Their first album, Tarney and Spencer, was released in 1976 in the UK only, on the Bradley's Records label, and was co-produced with Dave Mackay. It features the Shadows' future member, Cliff Hall, on keyboards. The album was re-released on CD in 2003 by Sanctuary Records/Castle Communications with four bonus tracks.

In 1976, Tarney/Spencer's first UK single, "I'm Your Man Rock and Roll", was released but did not reach the top 30 on the national chart. To promote the track, in April, they appeared on BBC1's Top of the Pops, introduced by Tony Blackburn. The appearance was repeated in April 2011 on BBC4's series of Top of the Pops re-runs. In July 1976, "I'm Your Man Rock and Roll", reached No. 71 on the US Cashbox top 100 singles chart. In 1978 they signed with A&M Records for the US market. In 1978 another single, "Takin' me Back", reached No. 7 on the South African singles charts.

The band's second studio album, Three's a Crowd, was released in 1978; it was recorded in London and produced by David Kershenbaum. For the album Spencer also provided synthesisers; guest lead vocalists included Stuart Calver and Tony Rivers. Members of UK's Climax Blues Band, Colin Cooper, John Cuffley, Peter Filleul, Pete Haycock and Derek Holt, guested on this album. It featured packaging with rounded corners, shaped like an American-style café menu card. Tracks received airplay on US AOR radio stations and the album reached No. 174 on the Billboard 200. Its single, "It's Really You", hit No. 86 on the Billboard Hot 100. In Europe the album and related singles failed to chart. The British/European packaging had conventional square corners.

The third studio album, Run for Your Life, was recorded in the US, and again it was produced by Kershenbaum, which appeared in 1979. With airplay on AOR radio, the album reached No. 181 on the Billboard 200. Its lead single, "No Time To Lose", rose to No. 84 on the Billboard Hot 100. The album cover was manufactured with one of four slightly different sleeves each with the title in: red, green, silver or gold, with a library of paper-back novels as an artwork theme. The British version is different, depicting a female's leg, wearing a stiletto shoe, and avoiding an oncoming red car.

In 1979, after the release of a non-album single "Cathy's Clown", a cover version of The Everly Brothers' 1960 hit, which was produced by Bruce Welch, the band were released from their contract with A&M and discontinued the Tarney-Spencer Band. "Cathy's Clown" single received airplay on London's Capital Radio (95.8FM/194 mW) but it missed the national chart. It did chart in the Netherlands however. Two years after the band broke up, "No Time to Lose", was resurrected in 1981; when MTV was launched, it occasionally aired the track's music video. A&M then reissued the single, which charted a second time on the Hot 100, reaching No. 74.

== Later work ==
Trevor Spencer left the UK in the mid-1980s and returned to Australia, he lived in Perth and started the Sh-Boom studios with Gary Taylor. They worked on Hank Marvin's 1990s solo albums. Alan Tarney worked as a producer and songwriter from 1979 and assisted in Cliff Richard's resurgent chart career in the late 1970s and again in 1980 with the single "We Don't Talk Anymore" and the mid-80s albums, I'm No Hero, Wired for Sound, Stronger and Always Guaranteed. Tarney also worked with a-ha during the 1980s: he produced their first three albums Hunting High and Low (including their single, "Take on Me"), Scoundrel Days and Stay on These Roads.

== Discography ==
=== Albums ===
List of albums, with selected chart positions
Title	Album details	Peak chart positions
Title	Album details	US
Tarney and Spencer	Released: 1976; Label: Bradley's (Brad1011/TC-ZCBRA1011); Format: LP, MC	—
Three's a Crowd	Released: 1978; Label: A&M (4692, AMLH68466/TC-CAM68488); Formats: LP, MC, 8-track	174
Run for Your Life	Released: 1979; Label: A&M (4757, AMLH64757/TC-CAM64757); Formats: LP, MC, 8-track	184
"—" denotes a release that did not chart or was not issued in that region.

=== Singles ===
List of singles, with selected chart positions
Title	Year	Peak chart positions			Album
Title	Year	US Cash	US Hot	AUS	Album
"I'm Your Man Rock and Roll"	1976	71	—	—	Tarney and Spencer
"If You Knew"	1976	—	—	—	Tarney and Spencer
"I Can Hear Love"	1976	—	—	—	Tarney and Spencer
"Takin' Me Back"	1978	—	—	—	Three's a Crowd
"Easier for You"	1978	—	—	—	Three's a Crowd
"It's Really You"	1978	89	86	—	Three's a Crowd
"No Time to Lose"	1979	68	74	66	Run for Your Life
"Cathy's Clown"	1979	—	—	86	Non-album single
"—" denotes a release that did not chart or was not issued in that region.

Production credits by Alan Tarney & Trevor Spencer

- Blackie – "Making a Bad Boy Good" RAK 7" single (1979)
