= Alleluia (album) =

Studio album by The Priests
- Released: October 7, 2016
- Recorded: August 2016 at Red Box Studios, Belfast
- Genre: Classical; Religious
- Label: SWM7
- Producer: Frank Gallagher

The Priests chronology
Harmony (2009)	Alleluia (2016)

Alleluia is the third studio album by Catholic group, The Priests. It was released in 2016 on SWM7.

== Track listing ==
No.	Title	Length
1.	"Morning Has Broken"	2:46
2.	"Jesu, Joy of Man's Desiring"	3:23
3.	"Nearer, My God, to Thee"	3:25
4.	"The Lord is My Shepherd (Psalm 23)"	3:04
5.	"Be Thou My Vision (ft. Moya Brennan)"	3:04
6.	"You Raise Me Up"	4:47
7.	"Lord of the Dance"	2:46
8.	"Ave Maria"	2:52
9.	"Alleluia (Pachelbel's Canon)"	3:35
10.	"Down in the River to Pray"	3:00
11.	"Ave Verum"	3:25
12.	"Céad Míle Fáilte Romhat"	3:13
13.	"Panis angelicus"	3:19
14.	"Hallelujah Chorus (from Handel's Messiah)"	4:05

Bonus track
No.	Title	Length
15.	"Eleanor Rigby"	3:04

== Personnel ==
The Priests

- Fr. Eugene O'Hagan – vocals
- Fr. David Delargy – vocals
- Fr. Martin O'Hagan – vocals

Additional musicians

- Moya Brennan – vocals on "Be Thou My Vision"
- Melisma – choir
- Slovak National Symphony Orchestra – orchestra
- Geraldine O'Dougherty – harp
- Jody Jenkins – percussion, piano, and keyboards
- Jonathan Hutton – piano

Production

- Frank Gallagher – producer and arranger
- Alastair McMillan – mix engineer
- Tim Young – mastering engineer at Metropolis Studios, London
- Kieran Lynch – engineer
- Richard Brown – assistant engineer
- Paul Campbell – additional programming
- Andrew Simon McAllister – additional programming
- Fergus Murphy – additional programming
- Matthew Sammon – pre-production engineer
