= Sky 2 (album) =

Studio album by Sky
- Released: 18 April 1980
- Studio: Studio 3, Abbey Road Studios
- Genres: Progressive rock, classical crossover
- Length: 79:56
- Label: Arista/Ariola
- Producers: Sky, Haydn Bendall, Tony Clark

Sky chronology
Sky (1979)	Sky 2 (1980)	Sky 3 (1981)

Sky 2 is the second album by English/Australian instrumental progressive rock band Sky, released in 1980. Despite being a double album it reached number one in the British Album charts, and at the time was the fastest double album to receive platinum status in the UK, while the instrumental single "Toccata" peaked at 5 in the British Singles Chart. The album was released in the United States and Canada as Sky (not to be confused with the band's debut album of that name), becoming the group's first and highest-charting entry on the Billboard 200.

Francis Monkman played guitar on the 20-minute rock suite "FIFO". "FIFO" stands for "First In, First Out", and is a piece about computer processing.

The track "Tuba Smarties" is a light-hearted piece composed and played on tuba by bassist Herbie Flowers, and commonly played during the band's live show as a humorous encore. It is named after Smarties chocolate confectionery, that are sold in cardboard tubes.

The track "Vivaldi" is Sky's own version of an earlier track by fellow progressive rock band Curved Air, of which Monkman was formerly a member. It originally appeared on their 1970 album "Air Conditioning".

== Track listing ==
=== Original vinyl / 1980 Spanish cassette ===
Side one
No.	Title	Writer(s)	Length
1.	"Hotta"	Kevin Peek, Herbie Flowers	7:46
2.	"Dance of the Little Fairies"	Flowers	3:31
3.	"Sahara"	Peek	6:56
Total length:			18:13

Side two – FIFO
No.	Title	Writer(s)	Length
1.	"Fifo"	Francis Monkman	6:44
2.	"Adagio"	Monkman	2:29
3.	"Scherzo"	Monkman	4:19
4.	"Watching the Aeroplanes"	Monkman	3:33
Total length:			17:05

Side three
No.	Title	Writer(s)	Length
1.	"Tuba Smarties" (live)	Flowers	3:18
2.	"Ballet-Volta"	Praetorius, Arr. John Williams	2:45
3.	"Gavotte & Variations" (Suite in A Minor, RCT 5: Gavotte et Six Doubles)	Rameau	6:14
4.	"Andante" (Concerto For Two Mandolins in G Major, RV 532: Andante)	Vivaldi, Arr. Williams	2:58
5.	"Tristan's Magic Garden"	Tristan Fry	4:09
6.	"El Cielo"	Traditional, Arr. Williams	4:20
Total length:			23:44

Side four
No.	Title	Writer(s)	Length
1.	"Vivaldi"	Darryl Way	4:03
2.	"Scipio"	Flowers	12:09
3.	"Toccata"	Bach, Arr. Peek	4:42
Total length:			20:54

=== 1980 UK cassette (ZC SKY2) ===
Side one
No.	Title	Length
1.	"Hotta"	7:46
2.	"Dance of the Little Fairies"	3:31
3.	"Sahara"	6:55
4.	"FIFO" (1st Movement Fifo / 2nd Movement Adagio / 3rd Movement Scherzo / 4th Movement Watching The Aeroplanes)	17:05
5.	"Vivaldi"	4:03
Total length:		39:20

Side two
No.	Title	Length
1.	"Tuba Smarties" (live)	3:18
2.	"Ballet-Volta"	2:45
3.	"Gavotte & Variations"	6:14
4.	"Andante"	2:58
5.	"Tristan's Magic Garden"	4:09
6.	"El Cielo"	4:20
7.	"Scipio" (Part I And Part II)	12:09
8.	"Toccata"	4:42
Total length:		40:35

=== 1992 Freestyle Records CD (SKY CD 2) ===
No.	Title	Length
1.	"Hotta"	7:46
2.	"Dance of the Little Fairies"	3:31
3.	"Sahara"	6:56
4.	"Fifo" (1st Movement)	6:44
5.	"Adagio" (2nd Movement)	2:29
6.	"Scherzo" (3rd Movement)	4:19
7.	"Watching The Aeroplanes" (4th Movement)	3:33
8.	"Tuba Smarties" (live)	3:18
9.	"Ballet-Volta"	2:45
10.	"Tristan's Magic Garden"	4:09
11.	"El Cielo"	4:20
12.	"Vivaldi"	4:03
13.	"Scipio"	12:09
14.	"Toccata"	4:48
Total length:		70:50

This version omits "Gavotte & Variations" and "Andante" from the original album.

=== 1992 Music Club CD (MCCD 078) & 1994 Nota Blu CD (9403201) ===
No.	Title	Length
1.	"Hotta"	7:48
2.	"Dance of the Little Fairies"	3:38
3.	"Sahara"	6:55
4.	"FIFO" (1st Movement Fifo / 2nd Movement Adagio / 3rd Movement Scherzo / 4th Movement Watching The Aeroplanes)	17:13
5.	"Tuba Smarties" (live)	3:22
6.	"Ballet-Volta"	2:46
7.	"Gavotte & Variations"	6:13
8.	"Andante"	2:59
9.	"Tristan's Magic Garden"	4:11
10.	"El Cielo"	4:25
11.	"Vivaldi"	4:03
12.	"Scipio" (Parts I and II; early fade)	11:07
13.	"Toccata"	4:40
Total length:		79:29

This version contains all tracks from the original album, although "Scipio" has been faded out early, omitting some repeats, in order to fit the album onto one CD.

=== 1992 & 1993 Success CDs (22620CD / 16031CD) ===
No.	Title	Length
1.	"Hotta"	7:47
2.	"Dance of the Little Fairies"	3:32
3.	"Sahara"	6:56
4.	"FIFO" (1st Movement – Fifo / 2nd Movement – Adagio / 3rd Movement – Scherzo / 4th Movement – Watching The Aeroplanes)	17:12
5.	"Tuba Smarties" (live)	3:22
6.	"Ballet-Volta"	2:46
7.	"Tristan's Magic Garden"	4:11
8.	"El Cielo"	4:25
9.	"Vivaldi"	4:03
10.	"Scipio" (Part I and Part II)	12:09
11.	"Toccata"	4:42
Total length:		71:26

Largely follows the track list of the 1992 Freestyle Records CD, except all movements of "FIFO" are combined into one track, and some track lengths are slightly different.

=== 1994 Merlin Records CD ===
No.	Title	Length
1.	"Hotta"	7:48
2.	"Dance of the Little Fairies"	3:35
3.	"Sahara"	6:56
4.	"FIFO" (1st Movement Fifo / 2nd Movement Adagio / 3rd Movement Scherzo / 4th Movement Watching The Aeroplanes)	17:15
5.	"Tuba Smarties" (live)	3:22
6.	"Ballet-Volta"	2:47
7.	"Tristan's Magic Garden"	4:11
8.	"El Cielo"	4:26
9.	"Vivaldi"	4:04
10.	"Scipio" (Parts 1 And 2; early fade)	11:07
11.	"Toccata"	4:42
Total length:		70:13

Almost the same as the Success pressings, except for some minor track length differences, and the fact that the early fade edit of "Scipio" from the Music Club issue has been used. The Merlin Records cassette, released at the same time as this CD, however, contains the full album in its original track order, albeit still with the edited version of "Scipio".

=== 2005 Castle Music CD (CMRCD1087) ===
No.	Title	Length
1.	"Hotta"	7:47
2.	"Dance of the Little Fairies"	3:32
3.	"Sahara"	6:56
4.	"Medley" (Fifo / Adagio / Scherzo / Watching The Aeroplanes)	17:13
5.	"Tuba Smarties" (live)	3:22
6.	"Ballet Volta"	2:46
7.	"Gavotte & Variations" (edited version)	5:15
8.	"Andante"	2:58
9.	"Tristan's Magic Garden"	4:11
10.	"El Cielo"	4:25
11.	"Vivaldi"	4:03
12.	"Scipio" (Parts I and II)	12:09
13.	"Toccata"	4:40
Total length:		79:17

This version contains all album tracks, including the full length version of "Scipio". However, "Gavotte & Variations" has been edited to omit the final variation instead.

=== 2014 Esoteric Recordings CD & DVD ===
CD: original album (remaster)
No.	Title	Length
1.	"Hotta"
2.	"Dance of the Little Fairies"
3.	"Sahara"
4.	"FIFO" (Fifo / Adagio / Scherzo / Watching The Aeroplanes)
5.	"Tuba Smarties" (live)
6.	"Ballet Volta"
7.	"Gavotte & Variations" (edited version)
8.	"Andante"
9.	"Tristan's Magic Garden"
10.	"El Cielo"
11.	"Vivaldi"
12.	"Scipio" (Parts I & II)
13.	"Toccata"

DVD: video recordings (NTSC / Region free). Tracks 1–13 all recorded at Hammersmith Odeon; broadcast as "Rhythm on Two" – BBC TV 24 & 31 July 1980.
No.	Title	Length
1.	"Toccata"	4:38
2.	"Danza"	3:07
3.	"Sahara"	8:07
4.	"Dance of the Little Fairies"	4:33
5.	"Ballet / Volta"	4:35
6.	"Vivaldi"	4:41
7.	"Hotta"	10:27
8.	"Carillon"	3:57
9.	"Dies Irae"	7:48
10.	"Danza Paraguaya"	2:21
11.	"Valse Creollo"	3:22
12.	"Tuba Smarties"	3:28
13.	"FIFO" (1st, 2nd & 4th movements)	12:22
14.	"Toccata" ("Top of the Pops" – BBC TV 10 April 1980)	2:12

The CD in this version is sourced from the masters of the 2005 Castle reissue and therefore contains the same edited version of "Gavotte & Variations".

== Personnel ==
- John Williams – classical & electric guitars
- Francis Monkman – keyboards, synthesizers, harpsichord, piano, left-hand channel electric guitar on "FIFO"
- Herbie Flowers – bass guitar, tuba on "Tuba Smarties"
- Tristan Fry – drums, tuned percussion on "Tristan's Magic Garden" (drumkit, vibraphone, marimba, bass marimba, tympani & xylophones), trumpet on "Tuba Smarties"
- Kevin Peek – electric and classical guitars

== Charts ==
=== Weekly charts ===
Chart (1980–81)	Peak position
Australian Albums (Kent Music Report)	4
Austrian Albums (Ö3 Austria)	5
Dutch Albums (Album Top 100)	8
German Albums (Offizielle Top 100)	7
New Zealand Albums (RMNZ)	11
Norwegian Albums (VG-lista)	18
Swedish Albums (Sverigetopplistan)	33
UK Albums (Official Charts)	1
US Billboard 200	125

=== Year-end charts ===
Chart (1980)	Position
German Albums (Offizielle Top 100)	38
UK Albums (OCC)	11

== Certifications ==
Region	Certification	Certified units/sales
Australia (ARIA)	Platinum	50,000^{^}
United Kingdom (BPI)	Platinum	300,000^{^}
^{^} Shipments figures based on certification alone.
