= James Taylor Move =

Australian/British psychedelic pop, progressive rock group

- Genres: Psychedelic pop, progressive rock
- Years active: 1967–1968
- Labels: Festival
- Spinoff of: Hurricanes, John E. Broome and the Handels, Roadrunners, Delta Set, Eighteenth Century Quartet, Cam-Pact, Rockwell T. James and the Rhythm Aces, Tarney/Spencer Band, Sky, Chain
- Past members: Kevin Peek; Trevor Spencer; Alan Tarney; Robert John Taylor; John Pugh; Lance Dixon; Wendy Saddington

James Taylor Move was a short-lived Australian/British psychedelic pop, progressive rock group from Adelaide. It was formed by Kevin Peek on guitar (ex-Hurricanes, The Twilights, John E. Broome and the Handels), Trevor Spencer on drums, Alan Tarney on organ (John E. Broome and the Handels), and Robert John Taylor on lead vocals and bass guitar.

Early in 1967, the group won the South Australian finals of the Hoadley's Battle of the Sounds and traveled to Melbourne to compete in the national final. During that year the group released two singles, "And I Hear the Fire Sing" / "Magic Eyes" and "Baby Jane". "Magic Eyes" peaked in the Go-Set National Top 40 Singles Chart. In June 1968 Wendy Saddington, a blues vocalist, replaced Taylor but the group disbanded by the end of the year.

== History ==
James Taylor Move formed in early 1967 when an Adelaide discotheque-owner wanted a house band. The original line-up was Kevin Peek on guitar (ex-Hurricanes, John E. Broome and the Handels), Trevor Spencer on drums, Alan Tarney on organ and bass guitar (John E. Broome and the Handels), and Robert John Taylor on lead vocals. John E Broome and the Handels was an R&B group from Adelaide that relocated to the United Kingdom, Peek and Tarney had returned to Australia. Not long after forming they won the South Australian finals of the Hoadley's Battle of the Sounds and in July they traveled to Melbourne to compete in the national final.

James Taylor Move supported fellow-Adelaide group, The Twilights, and followed them to relocate to Melbourne. In August 1967 James Taylor Move issued their debut single, "And I Heard the Fire Sing" / "Magic Eyes", which peaked at No. 33 on the Go-Set National Top 40 Singles Chart. According to Ian McFarlane, Australian rock music historian, the "Hendrix-derived 'And I Heard the Fire Sing' was too much for local radio of the day, but programmers flipped the single over to reveal the more radio-friendly psychedelic pop of 'Magic Eyes'". The group followed with a second single, "Baby Jane", in October that year.

In May 1968, Peek was replaced by John Pugh on guitar (ex-Roadrunners, Delta Set, Eighteenth Century Quartet, Cam-Pact) and Lance Dixon joined on organ and saxophone (Rockwell T. James and the Rhythm Aces). The next month Taylor left and Wendy Saddington (Revolution) joined on lead vocals. By the end of the year the group had disbanded.

== After disbandment ==
After James Taylor Move broke up, Peek, Spencer and Tarney formed the Kevin Peek Trio (1968–69) and travelled to the UK. They joined with ex-The Twilights guitarist, Terry Britten, to form Quartet (1969–70). Subsequently, Spencer and Tarney teamed up in Tarney/Spencer Band (1975–79). Peek was later a member of Sky (1978–91). Saddington joined Chain (1968–69), Copperwine (1970–71) and then had a solo career.

James Taylor Move's track "And I Heard the Fire Sing" was covered by Australian alternative metal group, Grinspoon, for their 2005 compilation album, Best in Show, on a limited edition bonus disc. Lancashire progressive group, Earthling Society, recorded it as the B-side of their 2011 single, "The Green Manalishi", which is a cover of an early Fleetwood Mac song.

== Discography ==
=== Singles ===
- "And I Heard the Fire Sing" / "Magic Eyes" (August 1967, Festival Records FK 1892)
- "Baby Jane" (October 1967, Festival Records FK 2025)

== Members ==
- Kevin Peek – guitar (1967–1968)
- Trevor Spencer – drums (1967–1968)
- Alan Tarney – organ (1967–1968)
- Robert John Taylor – lead vocals, bass guitar (1967–1968)
- John Pugh – guitar (1968)
- Lance Dixon – organ, saxophone (1968)
- Wendy Saddington – lead vocals (1968)
