= Sky 4: Forthcoming =

Studio album by Sky
- Released: March 1982
- Recorded: Studio 3, Abbey Road Studios
- Genre: Progressive rock
- Length: 39:52
- Label: Ariola
- Producer: Sky, Haydn Bendall, Tony Clark

Sky chronology
Sky 3 (1981)	Sky 4: Forthcoming (1982)	Sky Five Live (1983)

Sky 4: Forthcoming is the fourth studio album by English/Australian instrumental progressive rock band Sky, released in 1982. It is the only Sky album to contain no original compositions - except for Kevin Peek's rewrite of a 13th-century melody - relying instead on the band's arrangements of other (mostly classical) composers' pieces. The album entered the UK charts on 3 April 1982, where it peaked at No. 7.

In 2015 Esoteric Recordings continued a schedule of remasters and expanded releases with this recording.

== Track listing ==
Side one
No.	Title	Writer(s)	Length
1.	"Masquerade"	Khatchaturian, Arr. Steve Gray	3:20
2.	"Ride of the Valkyries"	Wagner, Arr. Gray	5:07
3.	"March to the Scaffold"	Berlioz, Arr. Tristan Fry	5:00
4.	"To Yelasto Pedi (Theme From 'Z')"	Theodorakis, Arr. John Williams	4:00
5.	"Waltz No.2 (From Valses Nobles et Sentimentales)"	Ravel, Arr. Gray	2:35

Side two
No.	Title	Writer(s)	Length
6.	"Fantasy"	J.S.Bach, Arr. Williams	3:14
7.	"My Giselle (From a Theme by Adam De La Halle)"	Kevin Peek	4:36
8.	"Xango"	Villa-Lobos, Arr. Sky	5:07
9.	"Fantasia"	Mudarra, Arr. Herbie Flowers & Kevin Peek	3:43
10.	"Skylark"	Hoagy Carmichael, Arr. Gray	3:10

=== 2015 two disc reissue edition ===
CD: Original album (Remaster)
No.	Title	Length
1.	"Masquerade" (2015 Digital Remaster)
2.	"Ride of the Valkyries" (2015 Digital Remaster)
3.	"March to the Scaffold" (2015 Digital Remaster)
4.	"To Yelasto Pedi (Theme From 'Z')" (2015 Digital Remaster)
5.	"Waltz No.2 (From Valses Nobles et Sentimentales)" (2015 Digital Remaster)
6.	"Fantasy" (2015 Digital Remaster)
7.	"My Giselle (From a Theme by Adam De La Halle)" (2015 Digital Remaster)
8.	"Xango" (2015 Digital Remaster)
9.	"Fantasia" (2015 Digital Remaster)
10.	"Skylark" (2015 Digital Remaster)

DVD: Video recording (NTSC / Region Free)
No.	Title	Length
1.	"West Wind" (Recorded for BBC TV broadcast on 8 July 1982)
2.	"My Gizelle" (Recorded for BBC TV broadcast on 8 July 1982)
3.	"Fool on the Hill" (Recorded for BBC TV broadcast on 8 July 1982)
4.	"Tuba SmartiesS" (Recorded for BBC TV broadcast on 8 July 1982)
5.	"Sister Rose" (Recorded for BBC TV broadcast on 8 July 1982)
6.	"Listen with Mother" (Recorded for BBC TV broadcast on 8 July 1982)
7.	"Meheeco" (Recorded for BBC TV broadcast on 8 July 1982)

== Personnel ==
Sky

- John Williams - Guitar
- Steve Gray - Synthesizers, Piano, Keyboard, Harpsichord, Clavinet
- Herbie Flowers - Double Bass, Bass Guitar
- Tristan Fry - Drums, Marimba, Celeste
- Kevin Peek - Guitar

Additional

- Peter Lyster-Todd - Management
- Chris Blair - Mastering
- Brian Griffin - Photography
- Cooke Key - Design
- Sky, Tony Clark, Haydn Bendall - Production

== Charts ==
Chart (1982)	Peak position
Australian Albums (Kent Music Report)	24
Norwegian Albums (VG-lista)	18
Swedish Albums (Sverigetopplistan)	43
UK Albums (OCC)	7

== Certifications ==
Region	Certification	Certified units/sales
United Kingdom (BPI)	Gold	100,000^{^}
^{^} Shipments figures based on certification alone.
