= Richard Durrant =

- Born: 2 November 1962 (age 64); Brighton, England, United Kingdom
- Genres: Classical, pop, jazz, folk, progressive rock
- Years active: 1979–present
- Label: Independent
- Website: www.richarddurrant.com

Richard Durrant Dip RCM, ARCM, FLCM (born 2 November 1962) is an English guitarist and composer. He studied guitar, cello, and composition at the Royal College of Music in London between 1981 and 1986. He has pursued both performance and composition. He is one of the only classical guitar virtuosi who performs standing up.

== Work ==
Durrant's compositions include ‘The Girl at the Airport’ (for guitar and strings released 2016, recorded with the City of Prague Philharmonic Strings July 2015), ‘Cycling Music’ (for guitar, sequencers and bicycle percussion, released 2014), ‘The Polar Bear’ (for solo guitar with narrator, released 2013 and featuring the voice of Barry Cryer), ’Wilbury Summer’ (released 1997), ‘The Rucenitsa Guitar Quartet' (flute, guitar, viola and cello) and 'Superluminal' (voice, guitar, string-quartet & electronics). There is also a very early Clarinet Sonata (1982) and other instrumental works including numerous guitar solos (‘La Isla del Paraguay’, ‘Apreton de Manos’, ‘The Early Learning Sonata’), children's songs and folk tunes as well as music for the BBC, including the BBC1 skating penguins logo & music for the CBBC cartoon series ‘Metalheads' (Telemagination). Richard Durrant has written, and sung, numerous songs for BBC Schools TV programmes Numbertime and Watch. He has also produced recordings for other artists including The Ukulele Orchestra of Great Britain (‘The Secret of Life’ 2004) and Don Partridge (‘The Highwayman’ 2002).

In the early 1990s Durrant toured as lead guitarist with the band Sky. This was their last UK tour. Venues included the Barbican and The Royal Festival Hall, London. He went on to perform regularly with Herbie Flowers.^{[2]}

One of his more challenging performances is a reinterpretation of Steve Reich's Electric Counterpoint for soloist and 20 pre-recorded guitars. His concerts are difficult to categorise as he covers many styles and often includes improvisations and electronic treatments – but he is, at his core, a classical performer.

== Career ==
By the time of his attendance at the Royal College of Music, Richard Durrant was an experienced performer with a growing reputation. He spent much of his time at college performing Bob Dylan songs in London's tube stations. Following his debut recital at the South Bank, London in 1986, Richard pursued diverse interests in electro/acoustic music, improvisation, composition, and multi-media.

For several years, Durrant toured a solo show billed as “Richard Durrant – The Guitar Whisperer.” The show used projections of specially commissioned, short films as occasional backdrops in a multi-media entertainment built around a classical guitar recital. Durrant also likes to include his striking interpretations of music by J.S. Bach on "wrong" instruments such as banjo, tenor guitar and ukulele.

In 2014, Durrant released his minimalist styled album Cycling Music. To promote the album and raise money for charity (The Big C 2014 and the Cyclist Defence Fund – CDF – 2015), he toured over 3,000 miles across the UK with his one-man show cycling the whole production from gig to gig on the back of his bike. The music from Cycling Music was used by the BBC during their coverage of Le Tour 2014. Richard's Cycling Music tour was featured on ITV's The Cycling Show in July 2014.

In recent years, Richard Durrant has visited many UK venues, including the Hawth Theatre Crawley, Norwich Playhouse, The Stables Wavendon, Yvonne Arnaud Guildford, Brighton Dome, BBC Proms Celebration in Trafalgar Square, Keswick Theatre by the Lake, Theatre Severn, The Royal Albert Hall (with the Royal Philharmonic Orchestra), Rose Theatre Tewkesbury, The Stables Milton Keynes, Bedford Prom in the Park, Aros Centre Isle of Skye, Rose Theatre, Kingston, Epsom Playhouse, Birmingham Conservatoire, The De La Warr Pavilion, Mold Theatr Clwyd and the New Wolsey, Ipswich. He has also performed a large number of concerts over many years for the UK Rural Touring Network.

UK festival performances include Wildlife Festival, Sidmouth, Adur, Brighton, and the International Guitar Festival of Great Britain. In Europe he has performed solo concerts in Belgium, Denmark, France, Holland, Switzerland and Spain.

Durrant has played many concerts with the Brighton Philharmonic Orchestra, as well as the Hanover Orchestra, BBC Midlands Orchestra, the Royal Philharmonic Orchestra.

In May 2011, Durrant was invited to launch his latest solo album in Paraguay and, whilst there, in recognition of his services as a champion of Agustín Barrios, he was officially proclaimed an Illustrious Visitor to Asunción. He has since returned to South America many times playing in Paraguay, Buenos Aires, Argentina and Arequipa, Peru.

In November 2010 Durrant was awarded a fellowship of the London College of Music for professional achievement. He has been an official ambassador for the Brighton Youth Orchestra since 2015.

He was chairman of the Adur Festival for many years until his resignation in 2005. He is still closely involved with the arts scene in West Sussex especially since the opening of The Ropetackle Arts Centre in Shoreham by Sea. He is a passionate supporter of community arts projects. He is a regular visitor to local schools wherever he is performing. In October 2002, as recognition of his work promoting art in the community, Richard was presented with a Daily Mail Golden Jubilee Award by Charles, Prince of Wales.

== Solo studio albums ==
- Sarabande
- The Music of Castelnuovo Tedesco
- Music From the Colourdome
- Recuerdos – Guitar Classics
- The Number 26 Bus to Paraguay
- Hijo de Hombre
- Christmas Guitars
- Cycling Music
- The Girl at the Airport
- A Quiet Word From the 13th Century
- Stringhenge
- Rewilding
- The Sleep of a King

== Collaborative albums ==
- Pandora (with Herbie Flowers)
- Nick & Dick – Acoustic Collaborations (with Nick Pynn)
- Guitar and Harpsichord (with Howard Beach)
- Durrant y Ledesma (with Ismael Ledesma)

== Video releases ==
- Richard Durrant – The Guitar Whisperer
