= Nude (Camel album) =

Studio album by Camel
- Released: 23 January 1981
- Recorded: September 1980
- Studios: Abbey Road Studios, London
- Genre: Progressive rock
- Length: 44:45
- Label: Gama/Decca
- Producers: Camel, Tony Clark, Haydn Bendall

Camel chronology
I Can See Your House from Here (1979)	Nude (1981)	The Single Factor (1982)

Professional ratings
Review scores
Source	Rating
AllMusic	4/5 stars
Classic Rock	8/10 stars

Nude is the eighth studio album by the English progressive rock band Camel, released in January 1981. A concept album, it is based on a true story of a Japanese soldier (Hiroo Onoda) marooned on an island during the Second World War who does not realise that the war is over. The title derives from his family name, 'Onoda'. The album mainly comprises instrumentals; only a few tracks contain lyrics. The lyrics were mainly written by Susan Hoover, except those for "Please Come Home", which were written by Andrew Latimer. It is the last Camel album to date to feature original drummer Andy Ward, and the last to feature more than one original member.

On 24 November 2023, a new edition of the album was remastered by Ben Wiseman and with new mixes by Stephen W. Tayler for Universal Music.

== Synopsis ==
Within the album, a story is displayed to tell about the album's plot. The concept mainly focuses on the theme of Onoda's isolation from the rest of the world and the effects on the way he lives after his disappearance and discovery.

The year is 1942, and the Second World War is in full swing. Hiroo Onoda has found himself living in a society ruled over by harsh regulations and orders that have altered the way that both himself and the rest of Imperial Japan have to live through everyday ("City Life/ Nude"). One day, Nude receives an envelope in the mail that require his services to the Japanese Army and the war effort. Seeing that he had no other options, he follows the instructions ("Drafted"). When the time had finally arrived, Nude finds himself alongside other young soldiers who are being loaded onto a ship to head for battle with a crowd of people watching behind them ("Docks"). Eventually, he is thrown into the fighting on a Pacific Island and is quickly overwhelmed by his surroundings, leading to a blackout during combat ("Beached"). When Nude wakes up, he is alone and without his regiment. He drifts off to sleep with the hopes that he will soon be rescued by his Unit, unaware of the fact that he has been left behind, all alone on the war-torn island ("Landscapes").

Time passes and many lonely years drift by. By now, Nude has given up his search and is currently living in a cave beside a lagoon, constantly patrolling through the jungles for any hiding enemies ("Changing Places"). Every once in a while, he retreats to a high mountaintop and runs through a procedure that fulfills his military duties, including reciting his countries national anthem and firing a bullet into the sky ("Pomp & Circumstance"). When a plane flies over him one day, Nude is greeted by a large content of leaflets, letters and photographs urging him to accept the end of the war and for him to return to his country ("Please Come Home"), however, he dismisses these replies, assuming that the Allied Forces were playing tricks on him. Over time, Nude feels a shift in his feelings and comes to the conclusion that the war had truly ended long ago ("Reflections"). While on a hunt somewhere later on, he is captured and thrown onto a boat taking him back to Japan ("Captured").

Upon hearing of his return, the entire nation rejoiced. When Nude had landed back in his home land, he is greeted with crowds of people in celebration and excitement for his return ("The Homecoming"). Despite the warm welcome, his years of loneliness and lack of communication leads to a breakdown; a tidal wave of publicity that he did not favor ("Lies"). With the passing of his fame came his separation from the rest of society and life became dull for the returned soldier, even with his fame and government rewards. On his 50th Birthday, a small group had thrown a party for him and gave him a cake that allowed him to remember his time away. Nude is moved by such a presentation and is allowed to be left alone to reflect on his past ("The Last Farewell: The Birthday Cake/ Nudes Return").

== Legacy ==
In 2008, Steven Wilson, writing in Classic Rock magazine, included Nude as one of "10 Mind-Blowing Concept Albums that may have slipped under your radar".

All Music Guide's Daevid Jehnzen wrote that "Nude" is, in many ways, just as impressive. Although a less accessible effort, it has a number of quite intriguing passages, especially as it features more improvisation, orchestration, and even some world rhythm influences. It's not as spacious as Camel's early progressive rock records, but it's quite atmospheric and creates its own fascinating world. On the other hand, Sputnik Music website said that the musicianship on this album is stellar, utilizing symphonies, vibraphones, and yes, it has even a saxophone. It’s one of the best progressive albums of the 80’s in a very troubled musical period to the progressive rock music. “Nude” doesn't need to hide behind masterpieces like “Mirage”. It's better than much of what was served to us by other progressive bands in that period.

== Track listing ==
All songs written by Andrew Latimer, except where noted.

Side one
No.	Title	Writer(s)	Length
1.	"City Life"	Andrew Latimer, Susan Hoover	4:41
2.	"Nude"		0:22
3.	"Drafted"	Latimer, Hoover	4:20
4.	"Docks"	Latimer, Kit Watkins	3:50
5.	"Beached"		3:34
6.	"Landscapes"		2:39

Side two
No.	Title	Writer(s)	Length
1.	"Changing Places"		4:11
2.	"Pomp & Circumstance"		2:05
3.	"Please Come Home"		1:12
4.	"Reflections"		2:39
5.	"Captured"	Latimer, Jan Schelhaas	3:12
6.	"The Homecoming"		2:49
7.	"Lies"	Latimer, Hoover	4:59
8.	"The Last Farewell: The Birthday Cake"		0:30
9.	"The Last Farewell: Nude's Return"		3:42

2009 Expanded & Remastered Edition

Bonus tracks recorded at Hammersmith Odeon on 22 February 1981 for BBC Radio One "In Concert". Excerpts from "Nude" medley:

No.	Title	Length
16.	"City Life"
17.	"Nude/Drafted"
18.	"Docks"
19.	"Beached"
20.	"Landscapes"
21.	"Changing Places"
22.	"Reflections"
23.	"Captured"
24.	"The Last Farewell: The Birthday Cake"
25.	"The Last Farewell: Nude's Return"

2025 Box Set Remastered Edition Esoteric Recordings

Disc One - The Original Mix Remastered
No.	Title	Writer(s)	Length
1.	"City Life"	Andrew Latimer, Susan Hoover	4:41
2.	"Nude"		0:22
3.	"Drafted"	Latimer, Hoover	4:20
4.	"Docks"	Latimer, Kit Watkins	3:50
5.	"Beached"		3:34
6.	"Landscapes"		2:39
7.	"Changing Places"		4:11
8.	"Pomp & Circumstance"		2:05
9.	"Please Come Home"		1:12
10.	"Reflections"		2:39
11.	"Captured"	Latimer, Jan Schelhaas	3:12
12.	"The Homecoming"		2:49
13.	"Lies"	Latimer, Hoover	4:59
14.	"The Last Farewell: The Birthday Cake"		0:30
15.	"The Last Farewell: Nude's Return"		3:42

Disc Two - The Stephen W Tayler Stereo Mix
No.	Title	Writer(s)	Length
1.	"City Life"	Andrew Latimer, Susan Hoover	4:41
2.	"Nude"		0:22
3.	"Drafted"	Latimer, Hoover	4:20
4.	"Docks"	Latimer, Kit Watkins	3:50
5.	"Beached"		3:34
6.	"Landscapes"		2:39
7.	"Changing Places"		4:11
8.	"Pomp & Circumstance"		2:05
9.	"Please Come Home"		1:12
10.	"Reflections"		2:39
11.	"Captured"	Latimer, Jan Schelhaas	3:12
12.	"The Homecoming"		2:49
13.	"Lies"	Latimer, Hoover	4:59
14.	"The Last Farewell: The Birthday Cake"		0:30
15.	"The Last Farewell: Nude's Return"		3:42

Disc Three - High Resolution 5.1 Surround Sound & Stereo Mixes By Stephen W Tayler / High Resolution Original Stereo Mix
No.	Title	Writer(s)	Length
1.	"City Life"	Andrew Latimer, Susan Hoover	4:41
2.	"Nude"		0:22
3.	"Drafted"	Latimer, Hoover	4:20
4.	"Docks"	Latimer, Kit Watkins	3:50
5.	"Beached"		3:34
6.	"Landscapes"		2:39
7.	"Changing Places"		4:11
8.	"Pomp & Circumstance"		2:05
9.	"Please Come Home"		1:12
10.	"Reflections"		2:39
11.	"Captured"	Latimer, Jan Schelhaas	3:12
12.	"The Homecoming"		2:49
13.	"Lies"	Latimer, Hoover	4:59
14.	"The Last Farewell: The Birthday Cake"		0:30
15.	"The Last Farewell: Nude's Return"		3:42

== Personnel ==
Camel

- Andrew Latimer – guitars, vocals, flute, koto & various keyboards; lead vocals on "Please Come Home" and "Lies"
- Colin Bass – bass, vocals; lead vocals on "City Life" and "Drafted"
- Andy Ward – drums, percussion

Additional musicians

- Mel Collins – flute, piccolo, saxophones
- Duncan Mackay – keyboards
- Jan Schelhaas – piano on "The Last Farewell"
- Chris Green – cello on "Drafted"
- Gasper Lawal – all percussion on "Changing Places"
- Herbie Flowers – tuba on "The Homecoming"

Production

- Engineered by Tony Clarke
- Cover design by Mayblin/Shaw/Munday

== Charts ==
Chart (1981)	Peak position
Dutch Albums (Album Top 100)	11
German Albums (Offizielle Top 100)	65
Norwegian Albums (VG-lista)	12
Spanish Albums (AFYVE)	33
Swedish Albums (Sverigetopplistan)	24
UK Albums (Official Charts)	34
