= Tristan Fry =

British drummer (born 1946)

- Born: Tristan Frederick Allan Fry; 25 October 1946 (age 79); London, England
- Occupation: Musician
- Instruments: Drums, timpani, percussion

Tristan Frederick Allan Fry (born 25 October 1946, London) is a British drummer and percussionist.

== Career ==
Fry began his career by joining the London Philharmonic Orchestra as a timpanist at the age of 17. He was a founding member of a number of ensembles, including the Nash, Fires of London and the London Sinfonietta. He also worked as a session musician with various pop and rock artists such as The Beatles, Frank Sinatra, Olivia Newton-John, John Martyn, Elton John, Nick Drake, and David Essex, among others. Fry was percussionist on the Beatles' "A Day In The Life", contributing timpani to the song's two orchestral climaxes. He also played in various other recordings including TV and movie soundtracks, and as Tristan was the timpanist with the Academy of St Martin in the Fields orchestra he has performed on many of their recorded works and concerts.

From 1979 - 1995 he was the drummer with the progressive rock group Sky with John Williams, Kevin Peek, Francis Monkman, Herbie Flowers and later Steve Gray when Monkman left to pursue other projects. It was during this period that he attained a reputation as a live drummer, with a revolving double Premier Kit, long drum solos in tracks such as "Hotta" (from the album Sky 2), "Meheeco" (from the album Sky 3) and "Son of Hotta" (from the later Cadmium album).

Fry plays with a variety of British orchestras on an ad hoc basis, including playing timpani with the London Chamber Orchestra at the wedding of Prince William and Catherine Middleton in 2011. He also freelanced with the chamber group of the Cadaques Orchestra in Spain, whose members include figures such as pianist and composer Ananda Sukarlan

== Sky discography ==
All titles released on Ariola records except where noted.

=== 1970s ===
- Sky (1979)

=== 1980s ===
- Sky 2 (1980)
- Sky 3 (1981)
- Sky 4: Forthcoming (1982)
- Sky Five Live (1983)
- Cadmium (1983)
- Sky The Great Balloon Race (1985) (Epic Records)
- Sky Mozart (with the St Martin in the Fields Orchestra and Sir Neville Marriner) (1988) (Mercury Records)
