= No Time to Lose =

Single by Tarney/Spencer Band

from the album Run for Your Life
- B-side: "Live Again"
- Released: March 1979
- Genre: Rock
- Length: 3:45 (1979); 3:17 (1981)
- Label: A&M 2124-S (1979); A&M 2366-S (1981)
- Songwriters: Alan Tarney, Trevor Spencer
- Producer: David Kershenbaum

Tarney/Spencer Band singles chronology
"Takin' Me Back" (1978)	"No Time to Lose" (1979)	"Cathy's Clown" (1979)

"No Time to Lose" is a rock song performed by English-Australian rock group Tarney/Spencer Band from their album Run for Your Life (1979). It was originally released in March 1979 through A&M Records, with a shorter re-release in 1981, during a period when the music video was enjoying substantial airplay on MTV. The song was written by Alan Tarney and Trevor Spencer, and produced by David Kershenbaum. The song charted twice on the United States Billboard Hot 100 chart with each of its releases.

== Chart performance ==
Chart (1979)	Peak position
Australia (Kent Music Report)	66
US Billboard Hot 100	84
Chart (1981)	Peak position
US Billboard Hot 100	74
