= The Priests (album) =

Studio album by The Priests
- Released: 14 November 2008
- Recorded: 2008 Basilica in Vatican City 29 September-1 October 2008 and in Dublin.
- Genre: Classical; Religious
- Label: Epic

The Priests chronology
| The Priests (2008) | Harmony (2009) |

Professional ratings
Review scores
| Source | Rating |
|---|---|
| Allmusic | (Performance) (Sound) |
| entertainment.ie | 3/5 stars |

The Priests is the debut album by Catholic group, The Priests. The album was a worldwide commercial success, peaking in the top ten in many countries. It also holds the record for "Fastest-selling UK debut for a classical act".

== Track listing ==
| # | Track | Composer | Length |
|---|---|---|---|
| 1 | "Ave Maria" | Franz Schubert | 4:35 |
| 2 | "Mit Würd' und Hoheit Angetan (From Die Schöpfung)" | Joseph Haydn | 3:54 |
| 3 | "Panis angelicus" | César Franck | 3:31 |
| 4 | "Irish Blessing" | Bob Chilcott | 2:57 |
| 5 | "Benedictus" | Robat Arwyn | 3:27 |
| 6 | "Plegaria (Los Tres Amores)" | F.M. Alvarez | 3:54 |
| 7 | "Pie Jesu" | Andrew Lloyd Webber | 3:13 |
| 8 | "Hacia Belen" | Traditional | 2:44 |
| 9 | "Abide With Me" | William Henry Monk | 3:30 |
| 10 | "Ag Críost an Síol" | Sean O'Riada | 3:38 |
| 11 | "Domine Fili Unigente (From Gloria)" | Antonio Vivaldi | 2:26 |
| 12 | "O Holy Night" | Adolphe Adam | 3:31 |
| 13 | "Ecce Sacerdos Magnus" | Edward Elgar | 2:58 |
| 14 | "Be Still My Soul" | Jean Sibelius | 2:41 |
Bonus tracks
| 15 | "A Losa Behain" | Sean O'Riada | 2:11 |

== Charts ==
=== Weekly charts ===
| Chart (2008–2011) | Peak Position |
|---|---|
| Australian Albums (ARIA) | 6 |
| Belgian Albums (Ultratop Flanders) | 7 |
| Belgian Albums (Ultratop Wallonia) | 12 |
| Danish Albums (Hitlisten) | 5 |
| Dutch Albums (Album Top 100) | 2 |
| Finnish Albums (Suomen virallinen lista) | 2 |
| French Albums (SNEP) | 10 |
| Irish Albums (IRMA) | 1 |
| Italian Albums (FIMI) | 35 |
| New Zealand Albums (RMNZ) | 2 |
| Norwegian Albums (VG-lista) | 1 |
| Scottish Albums (OCC) | 5 |
| South Korean Foreign Albums (Circle) | 17 |
| Spanish Albums (PROMUSICAE) | 7 |
| Swedish Albums (Sverigetopplistan) | 3 |
| Swiss Albums (Schweizer Hitparade) | 48 |
| UK Albums (OCC) | 5 |
| United States Billboard 200 | 66 |

=== Year-end charts ===
| Chart (2008) | Rank |
|---|---|
| Australian Albums Chart | 58 |
| Swedish Albums Chart | 11 |
| UK Albums Chart | 22 |

| Chart (2009) | Rank |
|---|---|
| Belgian Albums Chart (Flanders) | 73 |
| Dutch Albums Chart | 32 |
| French Albums Chart | 142 |
| Swedish Albums Chart | 82 |
| UK Albums Chart | 180 |

== Certifications ==
| Region | Certification | Certified units/sales |
|---|---|---|
| Australia (ARIA) | Platinum | 70,000^{^} |
| Belgium (BRMA) | Gold | 15,000^{*} |
| Finland (Musiikkituottajat) | Gold | 15,992 |
| Ireland (IRMA) | 5× Platinum | 75,000^{^} |
| Netherlands (NVPI) | Gold | 30,000^{^} |
| New Zealand (RMNZ) | 2× Platinum | 30,000^{^} |
| Poland (ZPAV) | Gold | 10,000^{*} |
| Spain (PROMUSICAE) | Gold | 40,000^{^} |
| Sweden (GLF) | Platinum | 40,000^{‡} |
| United Kingdom (BPI) | Platinum | 300,000^{^} |
^{*} Sales figures based on certification alone.^{^} Shipments figures based on certification alone.^{‡} Sales+streaming figures based on certification alone.
