= Changes (John Williams album) =

Music album from 1971

Studio album by John Williams
- Released: 1971
- Genre: Pop, classical
- Label: Fly Records
- Producer: Stanley Myers

John Williams chronology
Music for Guitar and Harpsichord (1971)	Changes (1971)	200 Motels (1971)

Cavatina (reissue)

Studio album by John Williams
- Released: 1979
- Genre: Pop, classical
- Label: Cube Records
- Producer: Stanley Myers

John Williams chronology
John Williams at His Best (1979)	Cavatina (reissue) (1979)	The Deer Hunter (1979)

Changes (aka Cavatina) is an album by John Williams issued on Fly Records in 1971, and on Columbia Records in the United States. In 1979 Cube Records reissued the album under the title “Cavatina". Like the CD with the same title (different artwork), this is simply the 1971 album "Changes" with the first and third tracks swapping places so that the title tracks are track 1. The cover art was designed and created by the famous British design studio Hipgnosis, and consists in a manipulated photo of Williams's left hand, shot by Aubrey Powell.

The track, “Cavatina”, originally included only the first few measures but, at Williams' request, it was rewritten for guitar and expanded by Stanley Myers. After this transformation it was used for the 1970 film The Walking Stick. In 1973, Cleo Laine wrote lyrics and recorded it as the song "He Was Beautiful" accompanied by Williams. The guitar version became a worldwide hit single when it was used as the theme tune to the Oscar-winning film The Deer Hunter (1978).

== Track listing ==
Side 1

1. " Bach Changes" (J. S. Bach, Adapted & Arranged by Stanley Myers) - Track 3 on "Cavatina"
2. "Theme from Z" (Mikis Theodorakis)
3. " Cavatina (Theme from The Deer Hunter)" (Stanley Myers) - Track 1 on "Cavatina"
4. "Spanish Trip (Canarios)" (Stanley Myers)
5. "Because" (John Lennon/Paul McCartney)
6. "Raga Vilasakhani Todi" (Stanley Myers)

Side 2

1. "Woodstock" (Joni Mitchell)
2. "Good Morning Freedom" (Greenaway/Cook/Hammond/Hazelwood)
3. "Nuages" (Django Reinhardt/Jacques Larne)
4. "Sarabande" (Stanley Myers)
5. "New Sun Rising (House of the Rising Sun)" (Trad. Adapted & Arranged by Stanley Myers)

== Orchestra ==
- Violins: Alan Loveday, Henry Datyner, David Katz, Jeff Wakefield, Desmond Bradley, Laurie Clay, Geoffrey Grey, Cyril Reuben, Basil Smart, Godfrey Salmon, Michael Jones, Michael Rennie, Homi Kanga, Bela Dekany
- Violas: Ken Essex, Stephen Shingles, Brian Hawkins, John Graham, Terry Hilton, Henry Myerscough
- Basses: Chris Lawrence, Danny Thompson, Joe Mudele
- Keyboards: Rick Wakeman
- Harp: David Snell
- Woodwind (Doubling Saxes): Christopher Taylor, Roy Willcox, Tony Coe, Ronnie Chamberlain
- Trumpets: Kenny Wheeler, Stanley Roderick, Ralph Izen, Derek Watkins
- Trombones: Nat Peck, Don Lusher, Peter Harcey, Ray Premru
- Drums: Barry Morgan
- Percussion: Ronnie Verrall, Terry Cox, Tristan Fry, Jim Lawless, Ray Cooper, Barry Guard
- Guitars: Alan Parker, Chris Spedding, Herbie Flowers

== Production ==
- Produced & Arranged by: Stanley Myers
- Recorded at: Olympic Studios
- Engineer: Keith Grant
