= Sky 3 (album) =

Studio album by Sky
- Released: 20 March 1981
- Recorded: Abbey Road, Studio 3
- Genres: Progressive rock, classical crossover
- Length: 45:12
- Label: Ariola
- Producers: Sky, Haydn Bendall, Tony Clark

Sky chronology
Sky 2 (1980)	Sky 3 (1981)	Sky 4: Forthcoming (1982)

Sky 3 is the third album by English/Australian instrumental progressive rock band Sky, released in 1981. It reached number three in the British Albums chart. It was the first album recorded after Francis Monkman's departure from the group, with Steve Gray replacing him on keyboards.

In 2015 Esoteric Recordings continued their schedule of remasters and expanded releases with this recording.

== Track listing ==
Side one
No.	Title	Writer(s)	Length
1.	"The Grace"	Herbie Flowers	0:30
2.	"Chiropodie No.1"	Kevin Peek, Flowers	4:22
3.	"Westwind"	Peek	6:22
4.	"Sarabande" (Keyboard Suite in D Minor, HWV 437: Sarabande)	Händel, Arr. John Williams	3:03
5.	"Connecting Rooms"	Tristan Fry	7:10

Side two
No.	Title	Writer(s)	Length
6.	"Moonroof"	Peek	4:03
7.	"Sister Rose"	Steve Gray	4:31
8.	"Hello"	Gray	4:12
9.	"Dance of the Big Fairies"	Flowers, Peek	3:30
10.	"Meheeco"	Flowers, Gray	6:35
11.	"Keep Me Safe And Keep Me Warm, Shelter Me From Darkness"	Flowers	0:54

=== 2015 two disc reissue edition ===
CD: Original album (Remaster)
No.	Title	Length
1.	"The Grace" (2015 Digital Remaster)
2.	"Chiropodie No.1" (2015 Digital Remaster)
3.	"Westwind" (2015 Digital Remaster)
4.	"Sarabande" (2015 Digital Remaster)
5.	"Connecting Rooms" (2015 Digital Remaster)
6.	"Moonroof" (2015 Digital Remaster)
7.	"Sister Rose" (2015 Digital Remaster)
8.	"Hello" (2015 Digital Remaster)
9.	"Dance of the Big Fairies" (2015 Digital Remaster)
10.	"Meheeco" (2015 Digital Remaster)
11.	"Keep Me Safe And Keep Me Warm, Shelter Me From Darkness" (2015 Digital Remaster)

DVD: Video recording (NTSC / Region Free)
No.	Title	Length
1.	"The Grace" (Recorded Live at Westminster Abbey, London on 24 February 1981 for BBC TV)
2.	"Chiropodie No.1" (Recorded Live at Westminster Abbey, London on 24 February 1981 for BBC TV)
3.	"Sarabande" (Recorded Live at Westminster Abbey, London on 24 February 1981 for BBC TV)
4.	"Sahara" (Recorded Live at Westminster Abbey, London on 24 February 1981 for BBC TV)
5.	"Recuerdos De La Alhambra" (Recorded Live at Westminster Abbey, London on 24 February 1981 for BBC TV)
6.	"Dance of the Little Fairies" (Recorded Live at Westminster Abbey, London on 24 February 1981 for BBC TV)
7.	"FIFO" (Recorded Live at Westminster Abbey, London on 24 February 1981 for BBC TV)
8.	"The Swan" (Recorded Live at Westminster Abbey, London on 24 February 1981 for BBC TV)
9.	"The Whale" (Recorded Live at Westminster Abbey, London on 24 February 1981 for BBC TV)
10.	"Scipio" (Recorded Live at Westminster Abbey, London on 24 February 1981 for BBC TV)
11.	"Hello" (Recorded Live at Westminster Abbey, London on 24 February 1981 for BBC TV)
12.	"Hotta" (Recorded Live at Westminster Abbey, London on 24 February 1981 for BBC TV)
13.	"Keep Me Safe and Keep Me Warm, Shelter Me From Darkness" (Recorded Live at Westminster Abbey, London on 24 February 1981 for BBC TV)
14.	"Toccata" (Recorded Live at Westminster Abbey, London on 24 February 1981 for BBC TV)

== Personnel ==
Sky

- John Williams – guitars
- Steve Gray – piano, synthesizer, harpsichord, clavinet
- Herbie Flowers – bass guitar, double bass, tuba
- Tristan Fry – drums, marimba, vibraphone, waterphone
- Kevin Peek – guitars

Other personnel

- Malcolm Davies – Mastering
- Sky, Haydn Bendall, Tony Clark – Production

== Charts ==
Chart (1981)	Peak position
Australian Albums (Kent Music Report)	7
Austrian Albums (Ö3 Austria)	4
Dutch Albums (Album Top 100)	31
German Albums (Offizielle Top 100)	39
New Zealand Albums (RMNZ)	39
Norwegian Albums (VG-lista)	11
Swedish Albums (Sverigetopplistan)	19
UK Albums (Official Charts)	3
US Billboard 200	181

== Certifications ==
Region	Certification	Certified units/sales
United Kingdom (BPI)	Gold	100,000^{^}
^{^} Shipments figures based on certification alone.
