= Harmony (The Priests album) =

Album by The Priests

Studio album by The Priests
- Released: 23 November 2009
- Recorded: 2009
- Genre: Classical
- Label: RCA

The Priests chronology
The Priests (2008)	Harmony (2009)	Noël (2010)

Professional ratings
Review scores
Source	Rating
Toronto Star	3/4 stars

Harmony is the second studio album by Catholic group, The Priests. It was released in 2009 on RCA Records.

== Track listing ==
1. "How Great Thou Art"
2. "Te Deum"
3. "Gaelic Blessing"
4. "Amazing Grace"
5. "Bist du bei mir (When Thou Art Near)"
6. "Benedictus"
7. "Stabat Mater"
8. "Laudamus Te"
9. "Ave Verum Corpus"
10. "King Of Kings"
11. "Lift Thine Eyes (From Elijah)"
12. "Silent Night"
13. "The Lord's Prayer"
14. "Bí Íosa Im Chroíse"
15. "You'll Never Walk Alone"

== Charts ==
=== Weekly charts ===
Chart (2009)	Peak position
Australian Albums (ARIA)	35
Belgian Albums (Ultratop Flanders)	17
Belgian Albums (Ultratop Wallonia)	57
Dutch Albums (Album Top 100)	58
Finnish Albums (Suomen virallinen lista)	22
French Albums (SNEP)	98
Irish Albums (IRMA)	7
New Zealand Albums (RMNZ)	3
Scottish Albums (Official Charts)	14
Spanish Albums (Promusicae)	57
Swedish Albums (Sverigetopplistan)	1
UK Albums (Official Charts)	18

=== Year-end charts ===
Chart (2009)	Position
Swedish Albums (Sverigetopplistan)	25
UK Albums (OCC)	108

== Certifications ==
Certifications for Harmony
Region	Certification	Certified units/sales
Ireland (IRMA)	Platinum	15,000^{^}
New Zealand (RMNZ)	Platinum	15,000^{^}
Sweden (GLF)	Gold	20,000^{^}
United Kingdom (BPI)	Gold	100,000^{^}
^{^} Shipments figures based on certification alone.
