= Sky (English/Australian band) =

British/Australian instrumental group

- Origin: London, England, United Kingdom; Sydney, New South Wales, Australia
- Genres: Progressive rock; instrumental rock; classical crossover
- Years active: 1978–1995
- Labels: Ariola, Arista
- Past members: Herbie Flowers; Tristan Fry; John Williams; Francis Monkman; Kevin Peek; Steve Gray; Paul Hart; Richard Durrant

Sky were an English–Australian instrumental rock group that specialised in combining a variety of musical styles, most prominently rock, classical and jazz. The group's original and best-known line-up featured two Australians - classical guitarist John Williams and electric guitarist Kevin Peek - alongside three Britons - bass player Herbie Flowers, drummer/percussionist Tristan Fry and keyboard player Francis Monkman.

== History ==
=== Roots and prehistory ===
In 1971, John Williams released the fusion album Changes, his first recording of non-classical music and the first on which he played electric guitar. Among the musicians working on the album were Tristan Fry (an established session drummer who was also the timpanist for the Royal Philharmonic Orchestra and the Academy of St Martin in the Fields, and had played Timpani on the Beatles' "A Day in the Life") and Herbie Flowers (a former member of Blue Mink and T. Rex, as well as a busy session musician who, among other things, had recorded the bassline for Lou Reed's "Walk on the Wild Side").

The three musicians became friends, kept in touch and continued working together on various projects during the 1970s. One of these was Williams' 1978 album Travelling, another substantially commercially successful cross-genre recording. As well as Fry and Flowers, the record featured former Curved Air member Francis Monkman (who, in addition to his progressive and psychedelic rock background as guitar and synthesiser player, was a trained and accomplished classical harpsichordist).

In 1979, Monkman performed on Louis Clark's album (per-spek-tiv) n., on which he collaborated with Australian session guitarist Kevin Peek. Peek was equally adept at classical guitar and pop/rock styles, having built a reputation both as a chamber musician and as a long-standing member of Cliff Richard's band, as well as from working with Manfred Mann, Lulu, Tom Jones, Jeff Wayne, Shirley Bassey and Gary Glitter.

=== First line-up, Sky and Sky 2: 1979–1980 ===
The success of Travelling inspired Williams and Flowers to set up Sky, their own long-term cross-genre band. The band name Sky was suggested by flautist Pinuccia Rossetti, a member of the Carlos Bonell Ensemble, and a friend of Williams. Fry and Monkman were swiftly recruited, with Kevin Peek being the final addition. The band began writing and recording instrumental music drawing on their collective experience of classical, light pop, progressive and psychedelic rock, light entertainment and jazz. After a protracted search for a record company, Sky signed with the small European label Ariola Records.

Although Sky was run democratically (with all members contributing music and/or arrangements), the presence of John Williams in the line-up was regarded as the band's biggest selling point and was emphasised in publicity. Williams' concurrent solo instrumental hit – "Cavatina – Theme from The Deer Hunter" – also helped to raise the band's profile. However, this selling was counterbalanced by some negative reviews from critics accustomed to Williams' classical performances, who remained unimpressed by his new direction with Sky.

Sky's self-titled debut album (released in 1979) was highly successful in Britain and Australia, quickly reaching gold record status and eventually topping out as a platinum record. The album featured versions of Eric Satie's "Gymnopedie No. 1" and Antonio Ruiz-Pipò's "Danza", as well as original compositions by Monkman and Flowers. Monkman's 'Cannonball' was a minor hit single, and the keyboard player also contributed the twenty-minute second-side composition "Where Opposites Meet" (a piece remembered by Williams as "an absolute masterpiece"), which was intended to combine and display the band's diverse influences. The band toured the UK in summer and autumn 1979, particular triumphs being sold-out concerts at the Royal Albert Hall and the Dominion Theatre in London (the latter a five-night sellout). In 2024, Williams recalled "we'd really go places. We'd play the Apollo venues in London, Glasgow, and Manchester. Those were in areas you wouldn't want to find yourself at two o’clock in the morning on your own. A lot of the audience were rough and ready, but with hearts of gold."

Sky managed to appeal to a surprising breadth of music fans, with Monkman recalling in 1999 that "the audiences contained a greater variety of people than you would believe possible - leather-clad youth refusing to sit next to their parents, that sort of thing. Amazing!", while Fry would add in 2024 "it was very mixed – we could get some lovely nuns as well as rockers." In 2024, Williams remembered "Francis would play Padre Antonio Soler's 'Fandango in D minor' and it would go on for twelve minutes. The rock and roll audience at the Apollo in Glasgow would jump up and down and go wild with enthusiasm. Culturally, this was really important. You wouldn’t get them into a normal harpsichord recital at a small hall. It was because of this setting. [Kevin Peek] and I would also play some Praetorius sixteenth-century pieces — just for five or six minutes — and the audience would hear them in a way they’ve never heard them before."

The band were also technologically ambitious, with Williams noting "we were the first to combine acoustic and electronic instruments [in] the way we did. We coupled the harpsichord with a Fairlight CMI and Oberheim synths. So, when you played the harpsichord, it would have a half-organ sound with all the dynamics of the harpsichord." (Note - it has been suggested elsewhere that Monkman's harpsichord was actually doubled with the Prophet-5 synthesizer, via "a clever pre-MIDI interface".)

In 1980, Sky recorded and released their second album, Sky 2. This was a double album that built upon its predecessor's success, becoming the tenth highest selling album in Britain that year. The album included Monkman's side-long rock suite "FIFO", a piece inspired by computer information processing techniques ("First In, First Out"). It also featured four classical pieces including three established chamber music pieces (played entirely straight) and the band's souped-up electric treatment of Bach's "Toccata and Fugue in D Minor". The latter was released as a single (under the name "Toccata") and reached number 5 in the national pop charts, giving the band the opportunity of performing on Top of the Pops.

Other tracks on Sky 2 included a Williams conflation of Spanish folk tunes, a Fry-penned tuned percussion piece, a cover of Curved Air's "Vivaldi", Peek's Arabic-influenced "Sahara", the psychedelic faux-Spanish folk dance "Hotta", plus several cheerful Flowers compositions including his tuba showcase "Tuba Smarties" and the longer-form "Scipio". Flowers described the latter piece as "the first piece of music to have Parts I & II running simultaneously", although an unimpressed Monkman would later claim that it had been "motivated by a 'look, anyone can write a long piece' attitude". Notably, Monkman refused "point blank" to ever play "Scipio" live.

In 1980, the BBC produced the television series Great Railway Journeys of the World which included an episode set in Australia. The music for this programme was by Sky, featuring tracks from the first two albums.

Following further tours of Australia and the UK, Francis Monkman left the band in October 1980 to concentrate on his own projects (having scored success with his soundtrack to the film The Long Good Friday). Monkman had also become dissatisfied with the band's direction, commenting later in 1999 "all I can say is, there seemed to emerge (from where?) a need for Sky to re-invent itself, come the third album, as a 'true' MOR outfit... So, clearly outvoted in the dash for mediocrity that the third album, for me, represents, I quit."

In 2014, Fry recalled, ruefully, "there was nothing personal as far as I know... one day he came in and said it wasn't for him any more - not quite those words, but something like that." In the same interview, Flowers added, more pointedly, "I think [he] felt a little bit that the music should all be completely original and serious... maybe by then the width of our material was too wide, you couldn't pin us down, and I think Francis might have felt that it was beginning to take a bit too much time."

The remaining Sky members, however, had no doubts about carrying on despite the fact that Monkman had been Sky's most prominent original composer and arranger.

=== Second line-up, Sky 3, Sky 4: Forthcoming, Sky Five Live and Cadmium: 1980–1984 ===
Monkman was replaced as Sky's keyboard player by Steve Gray. Like most of the other band members, Gray was an established session musician: he had previously played with Back Door, Quincy Jones, Henry Mancini, Michel Legrand, Lalo Schifrin, Peggy Lee, Sammy Davis Jr and John Barry. More recently, he had led WASP, a studio-based jazz-fusion band specialising in high-quality library music. Recalling Gray's recruitment, Flowers asserted "there aren't many musicians to my mind with whom everything they play and everything they write is beautiful... but Steve Gray was," adding "Steve was the gentlest of men, and when he rolled up it was just wonderful from the start." Gray's jazz credentials also appealed to Flowers, who confessed to being "an old jazzer" at heart.

Despite Gray's initial reluctance to return to playing live, he was persuaded to join the band in time for their first European tour. This was followed by another UK tour and (on 24 February 1981) the "Sky at Westminster Abbey" concert. A benefit show to commemorate the 20th anniversary of human rights organisation Amnesty International, the latter was conceived by British producer Martin Lewis and was the first-ever rock concert held at the abbey. The landmark event resulted in Sky receiving considerable positive media coverage: it was also videotaped for a BBC TV special and subsequently released on home video and laserdisc.

The Westminster Abbey concert was also the launch event for the band's third album, Sky 3. A generally brighter and breezier album than its predecessors, the record demonstrated Steve Gray's new and prominent compositional role within Sky, moving away from the harpsichord-orientated and psychedelic elements of the Monkman years and taking the band towards a more jazz-influenced sound. Flowers jokingly described the recording sessions as having been "a lot of laughter with some music in between." Sky went on to tour Australia, Europe and the UK in support of the release.

The fourth Sky album, Sky 4: Forthcoming, was released in March 1982. Sky's first album to feature no original material, it consisted predominantly of arrangements of classical compositions and was marketed under the slogan "Genius Past, Genius Forthcoming". Flowers has spoken of having thought that "John [Williams] needed to be considered more. Perhaps the other albums had got a little too rocky and the idea of this [one] was to slide us a little bit nearer to where we were all very comfortable... John was keen to do 'Fantasy' by Bach."

The band drew from a more diverse "classical" catalogue than might have been expected, with the pieces recorded varying from better-known classical/Romantic/Renaissance compositions (the aforementioned "Fantasy", part of Berlioz's "Symphonie Fantastique", one of Ravel's "Valses Nobles and Sentimentales", and a Mubarra fantasia) to assorted twentieth century works by Khatchaturian, Villa-Lobos and Theodorakis. Although the band did record a tongue-in-cheek, mock-pomp version of Wagner's "Ride of the Valkyries", Flowers recalled the arrangements on the album as having been "quite thorough... Doing an arrangement of another composer's work, you have to pay deference to it." The record also featured a version of Hoagy Carmichael's 1940s pop hit "Skylark", arranged by Gray and Williams to suit Williams' approach.

Once again, the band toured the UK and Australia to promote the album (and followed this up with trips to Europe and Japan), as well as recording a live-in-the-studio set for the BBC's Night Music series which was broadcast in July 1982. The Australian autumn tour featured the debut of plenty of new material, much of which was included on a live double album, Sky Five Live, released in January 1983.

Sky released their sixth album, Cadmium, in December 1983. The album contained a classical-rock arrangement of Prokofiev's "Sleigh Ride" (from the "Lieutenant Kijé Suite"), alongside seven original compositions. It also featured the first examples of commissioned compositions from contemporary writers from outside the band: Alan Tarney (Kevin Peek's old friend and fellow Cliff Richard collaborator) provided two further original tunes.

Two concerts at the Theatre Royal, Drury Lane, London were filmed and broadcast on Christmas Eve, 1983, with songwriter and singer-songwriter Patrick Ros as special guest. Ros provided three seasonal compositions of his own, on which he was backed by the band.

Having previously hinted that his work with Sky had been intended as a five-year stint, John Williams parted company with the band in February 1984, returning to a full-time classical career. Having favoured the approach and results on Sky's first two albums, in 2024 he would reflect on a certain dissatisfaction with the group's subsequent direction and musical development. He commented "when I think about the repertoire, I think about one-third to one-half of it was really good. But I think a lot of it, especially when I was leaving, was becoming a bit tame, like library music... [A lot of the] stuff was just entertainment. I don't think many pieces transferred to a pure listening experience as a recording. They didn’t stand up that well. They're okay, but they're not great... For me, Sky was a question of being on stage and how I approached that... There were a lot of great things about Sky and the band did very good shows... For that generation of people in their twenties and thirties when we were doing Sky, I know it led a lot of people into the guitar. And in retrospect, I'm pretty proud of that."

"John leaving was tragic in a way," Fry admitted in 2014, "but the band was capable of standing on its own by then, and it did have a track record. So, we decided to carry on. We felt that there were things we still wanted to do and pursue. Ultimately we were still enjoying it all too much to give it all up just then."

=== Third line-up, The Great Balloon Race and Mozart: 1984–1990 ===
Though Williams' departure had been amicable, his departure still came as a shock to Sky, since it happened just before the start of a scheduled, sold-out Australian tour. "John leaving did put us in a spot," noted Flowers, in 2015, "[but] we felt we couldn't let people down." The band quickly recruited two guest members to fill in on tour - session guitarist Lee Fothergill (an accomplished all-round musician who had first met Tristan Fry as part of the house band for 'The Val Doonican Show') and woodwind/keyboard player Ron Aspery (Steve Gray's former mentor in both Back Door and the Middlesbrough Municipal Junior Orchestra).

Both musicians joined the Sky live band at short notice and without much rehearsal, but used their quick-learning session player skills to excellent effect. Fry recalls Fothergill's performances in particular as having been "phenomenal... he was playing both John's and Kevin's parts - well, anyone would find it a little daunting, but Lee was just brilliant." In order to deal with potential audience disappointments at Williams' absence, since the guitarist had been considered to be Sky's biggest star and live draw, Flowers formally announced the news of Williams' departure at each concert and offered a full ticket price refund for anyone who was disappointed. Fry recalls that nobody actually took up the offer.

Fothergill and Aspery kept their guest player positions for Sky's European tour later in 1984, with Flowers commenting later "bringing in Ron and Lee broadened our horizons somewhat." While the duo were not eventually asked to join full-time, Sky also opted not to recruit a permanent replacement for Williams, remaining as a quartet with the option of including other musicians and instruments as desired. Despite the band's ongoing collective efforts to present themselves as a partnership of equals, concerns over the commercial impact of Williams' departure remained. During 1984, Sky released a stopgap "greatest hits" compilation called Masterpieces via mass-media label Telstar (which featuring a previously unreleased live version of the Beatles song "The Fool on the Hill", performed as a classical guitar duet by Williams and Peek).

In September 1984, Sky began recording their seventh album, The Great Balloon Race, in Kevin Peek's Tracks Studio in Western Australia. The Great Balloon Race was the first Sky album to feature entirely original material without any classical content, although two pieces ("Allegro" and "Caldando") were strongly classically-inspired. Guests included Aspery, Fothergill, pan-pipe player Adrian Brett and former Jeff Beck Band keyboard player Tony Hymas (who contributed the unusual semi-spoken album opener "Desperate For Your Love", ultimately Flowers' favourite piece on the record). Flowers recalled "we had the opportunity to use voice, brass and other things... which led onto a few adventurous experiments. It's definitely the most varied of the Sky albums but I'm glad about that. It stopped us being bored. You have to stick your head out of the window sometimes and look for different things." During the mixing stage, the band learnt that they had been dropped by Ariola Records. The album was eventually released on Epic Records (coincidentally, also the label releasing John Williams' albums) in April 1985.

During April and May 1985, Sky toured the UK to promote the record, again performing with guest players – Nicky Hopkins (better known as keyboard player for the Rolling Stones) and multi-instrumentalist Paul Hart (a former composer for the National Youth Jazz Orchestra who had also played with John Dankworth and Cleo Laine). Despite some favourable reviews, sales of The Great Balloon Race had been significantly lower than they had been for previous Sky recordings, and the tour saw the band playing to smaller audiences than on previous tours.

From mid-1985 to 1986, the members of Sky worked on other projects. Sky returned in 1987 with another Australian tour (titled "A New Journey"), this time featuring former Yes keyboard player Rick Wakeman in the guest musician slot.

For the rest of 1987, the core quartet worked on the Mozart album, which united the band with the orchestra of the Academy of St Martin-in-the-Fields. The project was initiated by Tristan Fry (due to his parallel work with both band and orchestra) and was inspired by the bicentenary of Mozart's death. The album contained full orchestral performances of Mozart's works, with Sky incorporated into the arrangements (most of which were written by Steve Gray). The band and orchestra (with Paul Hart returning as guest musician) promoted the album with a one-off concert at the Royal Albert Hall on 1 November 1987. Although the album ultimately became Sky's most successful album in the United States, Mozart was roundly panned and dismissed by the press and the band took another two years off. A second compilation album, Classic Sky, was released in 1990.

Former member Francis Monkman has claimed that "in the late '80s, long after John Williams had left, it was suggested that I write another long piece [for Sky], in the manner of 'Opposites' and 'Fifo'. The first movement of this work (which I determined to call 'Another Dish for the Roof') exists in demo form... The other three movements were planned, but scarcely sketched."

=== Fourth and fifth line-ups, and final years: 1990–1995 ===
When Sky returned to action in 1990, they had become a quintet again, having recruited Paul Hart as a full member. A skilled performer on a variety of instruments (including piano, keyboards, guitars, bass, mandolin, cello and violin), Hart had already proved his worth on the Great Balloon Race and Mozart concerts, broadening and reinforcing the band's sound. In 2024, Flowers would suggest that the band's first line-up change in 1981 had begun a process allowing the band's music and membership to broaden significantly over subsequent years: "when Steve [Gray] took over [on keyboards], that opened the door a bit for a little jazz lilt to the music... and that gave me a bit more authority to ask someone like Paul Hart – one of the world’s great jingle writers and violin players – to join."

The revived band played a one-off concert at the London Palladium on 24 June 1990, in part to promote the new Sky: Masterpieces compilation. Although the album did not contain any new recordings, the band were still creatively active. At the concert, new compositions by Paul Hart ("Reverie" and "Praeludium") and Kevin Peek ("Jehad") were premiered, alongside a revisiting of Francis Monkman's "Cannonball" (from the debut Sky album) and "Would You Say I'm In Love With You", a piece written by Herbie Flowers with his former Blue Mink colleague Roger Cook. The concert set was later recorded in the studio and also broadcast on television in 1991 as part of the Bedrock concert series on Central TV.

None of this work, however, made it to a studio-recorded album; and in 1991 Kevin Peek became the next member of the band to depart. Peek had been a full-time resident of Australia since 1982 and had become busy with multiple recording projects at Tracks Studio, all of which inhibited his practical ability to spend time in the UK working with Sky. Consequently, he no longer believed that he had enough time to commit to the band.

Peek was replaced by classical/cross-discipline guitarist Richard Durrant (an associate of Herbie Flowers), who joined the band in time for a comeback concert in September 1992 at the Barbican in London. However, although Sky toured the UK again during spring 1993, they were playing notably smaller venues than they had in the 1980s. As gaps in band activity grew longer, and audiences shrank, the group's remaining momentum was gradually lost. The last performance by Sky was at an RAF tribute concert in May 1995. Flowers has commented that "the last two or three years were more for the sheer joy of being in that fantastic band. We were still filling out places but I think we knew it would fizzle out and we nipped it in the bud before it did."

Although the band never formally disbanded, Sky never returned to active recording and performance; although various members still seemed to have a lot of affection for the project. As late as 2016, John Williams had expressed interest in a possible reformation; with Fry adding in 2024 (prior to the death of Herbie Flowers) "I don't feel as though we took it as far as we could. It would be a bit difficult, but that’s not to say it wouldn't happen. I'd love to, and I know Herbie would too." In the same interview as Fry, Flowers commented "it's like when they ask, 'Are Oasis going to do Glastonbury?' I think, 'Bollocks!'... Sky were great at the time, but we all change. If I heard something [of theirs] I'd be like, 'Oh no, God, I didn't realise it was that bad!'"

=== After Sky: individual careers ===
After leaving Sky in 1980, Francis Monkman divided his time between experimental rock music, library music and classical music recordings of solo keyboard work (generally harpsichord or church organ). He died on 11 May 2023.

Following his own departure from Sky in 1984, John Williams continued his original career as one of the world's leading classical guitarists. He would also commission two guitar concertos from other members of Sky, performing and recording Paul Hart's "Concerto For Guitar & Jazz Orchestra" with the National Youth Jazz Orchestra in 1987, and Steve Gray's "Guitar Concerto" with the London Symphony Orchestra in 1989 (although the latter was not released on record until 1996).

After leaving Sky in 1991, Kevin Peek continued to work as a musician and producer in Australia. In his later years, he underwent two bankruptcies, the first of which resulted in a three-year prison sentence. In 2010, he was linked to a "Ponzi" style investment scheme. In November 2011, he was back in court, bailed on 227 charges of gaining benefit by fraud: a trial date was scheduled for 27 January 2012, but abandoned due to Peek's ill health. He died in Perth, Western Australia, on 11 February 2013, from metastatic skin cancer.

Following Sky's last known collaborative work in 1995, Steve Gray continued his career as a respected composer (which he had been carrying out in parallel to his work with Sky). His compositions include two operas, a requiem mass for jazz big band and choir, the guitar concerto for John Williams and the LSO, and a piano concerto written for French jazz pianist Martial Solal. Gray also provided a full orchestration of the works of Brian Eno (in collaboration with the original composer). From 1991, he worked closely with the North German Radio (NDR) Big Band in Hamburg (at the invitation of singer and composer Norma Winstone) and from 1998 he worked as guest professor of composition and arrangement in the Hanns Eisler jazz department of Berlin Hochschule für Musik. Steve Gray died on 20 September 2008.

As well as branching out as a light entertainment raconteur, Herbie Flowers continued to work as a high-profile session musician and collaborated with Jools Holland, Clannad, Mike Hatchard and Paul McCartney. He also played in the band for the first live tour of Jeff Wayne's War of the Worlds show (having performed on the original studio album) and again in 2018. He frequently collaborated with Sky's final guitarist, Richard Durrant, on various musical projects (including a trio with former Gentle Giant drummer Malcolm Mortimore). He died on September 5, 2024.

Post-Sky, Tristan Fry has continued his work as a classical percussionist. He still works with the Orchestra of the Academy of St Martin in the Fields, as well as the Tristan Fry Percussion Ensemble.

Richard Durrant has continued to develop his own career as a classical guitarist, as well as composing film and television music and working as a record producer (notably for the Ukulele Orchestra of Great Britain). Durrant is also the founder of the acoustic record label LongMan Records.

Paul Hart went on to a career in film, television and commercial music and has written concert music for the London Symphony Orchestra, the Royal Philharmonic Orchestra and the King's Singers. His Concerto for Classical Guitar and Jazz Orchestra was revived for performance in 2008 by the Towson University Jazz Orchestra and guitarist Michael Decker.

=== Post-split releases and reissues ===
In 1993, Arista reissued the band's first five albums on CD, although cuts were made to certain albums to suit CD running times (a shorter edit of "Scipio" on Sky 2 and the complete removal of the twenty-minute suite "The Animals" from Sky Five Live). [The complete "Sky Five Live", with "The Animals", was issued as a double CD on Esoldun, with four bonus tracks from the four earlier studio albums. These were "Carillon" (Sky, listed as "Carillion"), "Toccata" (Sky 2), "Westwind" (Sky 3) and "Fantasia" (Sky 4).

In 2001, the band began a reissue programme of their back catalogue on Sanctuary Records, beginning with the Anthology compilation album. After four years wait, Sky reissued their debut album on the label in 2005 (with Sky 2 following on a different label, Castle Music). After this the reissues plan stalled (although occasional brief runs of the first two Sky albums would appear intermittently on small labels). It would be nine more years before a full Sky reissue programme was carried out properly.

In 2002, a live Sky album, Live in Nottingham, was released on Classic Rock Productions, drawing on the 1990 live-in-the-studio concert with the Peek/Flowers/Gray/Fry/Hart line-up, which had followed the band's lone Palladium concert in the same year.

In 2005, Quantum Leap Productions issued a live DVD, Live in Bremen, featuring the original Sky line-up and recorded at a German television show in either 1979 or 1980.

The entire Sky back catalogue was eventually reissued by Esoteric Recordings (a progressive-rock-friendly subsidiary of Cherry Red Records). On 27 October 2014, fully remastered versions of Sky and Sky 2 were released as CD/DVD packages, each containing a DVD of Sky's television appearances (in 1979 and 1980 respectively). Remastered versions of Sky 3 and Sky 4: Forthcoming were released on 26 January 2015, each with new sleevenote essays and companion live DVDs (the former featuring a companion DVD of the Sky at Westminster Abbey concert, the latter featuring the band's July 1982 live set for the BBC TV programme Night Music). Remastered versions of The Great Balloon Race and Mozart followed on 30 March 2015 (with new essays but no bonus DVDs). The reissue set was completed by 27 April 2015 release of the remastered Sky Five Live (as a double CD with new sleevenote essay and with "The Animals" restored to the running order) and Cadmium (as a double set with three bonus tracks, a new sleevenote essay and a DVD combining a previously unreleased BBC recording of Sky at Drury Lane and a rare performance of the piece "Troika" on the Val Doonican Show from December 1983).

In 2016, the band's entire output was reissued on coloured vinyl.

== Personnel ==
=== Members ===
- Herbie Flowers – bass guitar, double-bass, tuba (1978–1995; died 2024)
- Tristan Fry – drums, percussion, trumpet (1978–1995)
- Kevin Peek – guitars (1978–1991; died 2013)
- John Williams – guitars (1978–1984)
- Francis Monkman – harpsichord, synthesisers, organ, guitars (1978–1980; died 2023)
- Steve Gray – keyboards, saxophone (1980–1995; died 2008)
- Paul Hart – keyboards, guitars, mandolin, cello (1990–1995)
- Richard Durrant – guitars (1992–1995)

== Discography ==
- Sky (1979)
- Sky 2 (1980)
- Sky 3 (1981)
- Sky 4: Forthcoming (1982)
- Sky Five Live (1983)
- Cadmium (1983)
- Sky Masterpieces (1984)
- The Great Balloon Race (1985)
- Sky Mozart (1987)
