= Haydn Bendall =

- Haydn Bendall in 2011

Background information
- Born: 13 April 1951 (age 74); Essex, england
- Genres: Pop, rock, dance, classical cross-over, jazz, orchestral, film scores
- Occupation(s): Record producer, audio engineer, mixer
- Instrument: Keyboards
- Years active: 1970–present

Haydn Bendall (born 13 April 1951, Essex, England) is an English record producer, audio engineer and mixer. He was Chief Engineer at Abbey Road Studios for ten years and was awarded the Audio Pro Industry Excellence Award for Best Studio Engineer in 2009.

== Career ==
Bendall started out at Orange Studios, moving on to Steinway & Sons as a piano tuner. He joined Ken Townsend's Abbey Road team in 1973 as a part-time assistant, taking on a full-time position a year later.

Initially partnering with Tony Clarke, Bendall worked on albums by Herbie Flowers, BeBop Deluxe, Steve Harley, Alan Parsons, Cliff Richard and Camel, developing a close working relationship with Sky. In the 1980-90s, he worked with Kate Bush on five albums, including Hounds of Love in 1985. Further Abbey Road work included engineering or producing for XTC, Bonnie Tyler, Tina Turner and Massive Attack. Film soundtrack work included The Long Good Friday and Ryuichi Sakamoto's pieces on the Oscar and Grammy Award-winning soundtrack to The Last Emperor.

Leaving Abbey Road in 1991, Bendall became an independent producer/engineer. As an independent, Bendall has worked with Pet Shop Boys, Everything but the Girl, Pat Metheny, Chris Botti, Leona Lewis, The Priests, Mike Batt and Katie Melua. In 1992, Bendall engineered the Grammy Award-winning album Secret Story for Pat Metheny. He also worked with Eric Woolfson on the development of three musicals: Gaudi, Gambler and Poe.

He is currently based in Strongroom Studios located in Shoreditch, London.

Recently Bendall mixed and engineered La Voce for Russell Watson and Noël for The Priests. Other projects include engineering and mixing the Vatican album Alma Mater featuring the voice of Pope Benedict XVI, recording orchestral tracks for Andrea Bocelli and mixing tracks for Siphiwo Ntshebe.

In 2012, in collaboration with Walter Afanasieff, Bendall recorded the Grammy-Award-winning album Impressions for Chris Botti. Bendall also recorded Secret Symphony for Katie Melua.

In 2015 Bendall engineered and mixed Duets for Van Morrison which included collaborations with Bobby Womack, Natalie Cole, George Benson, Ginger Baker, Mark Knopfler, Mick Hucknall and Roger Daltrey.

2016 saw Bendall credited with the mix for Tom Ford's film Nocturnal Animals.

== Selected discography ==
1979 Cliff Richard – Rock 'n' Roll Juvenile
1981 Camel – Nude
1982 Sky – Sky 4: Forthcoming
1982 The Alan Parsons Project – Eye in the Sky
1982 Kate Bush – The Dreaming
1982 Camel - The Single Factor
1984 Camel - Stationary Traveller
1985 Kate Bush – Hounds of Love
1985 Alan Parsons – Vulture Culture
1986 Everything But the Girl – Baby, the Stars Shine Bright
1986 Paul McCartney – Press to Play
1987 Ryuichi Sakamoto – The Last Emperor – Grammy Award
1987 Marc Almond – Mother Fist and Her Five Daughters
1989 Kate Bush – The Sensual World
1990 a-ha – East of the Sun, West of the Moon
1990 Kate Bush – This Woman's Work: Anthology 1978–1990
1990 Gary Moore – Still Got the Blues
1990 Pet Shop Boys – Behaviour
1991 Camel – Dust and Dreams
1992 Pat Metheny – Secret Story – Grammy Award
1999 XTC - Apple Venus Volume 1
2002 Everything But the Girl – Like the Deserts Miss the Rain
2003 Pet Shop Boys – PopArt
2004 Chris Botti – When I Fall in Love
2005 Chris Botti – To Love Again: The Duets
2005 Katie Melua – Piece by Piece
2007 Leona Lewis – Spirit
2008 Il Divo – The Promise
2009 Andrea Bocelli – My Christmas
2010 Russell Watson – La Voce
2012 Chris Botti - Impressions - Grammy Award
2012 Katie Melua - Secret Symphony
2013 Sarah Brightman - Dreamchaser
2015 Van Morrison - Duets
2020 Andrea Bocelli - Believe

=== Selected singles ===
1981 Elton John and Kiki Dee – "Don't Go Breaking My Heart"
1981 Olivia Newton-John – "Physical"
1986 Peter Gabriel and Kate Bush – "Don't Give Up"
1986 Freddie Mercury – "Time" and "In My Defence"
1991 Tina Turner – "Simply the Best"
1991 Massive Attack – "Unfinished Sympathy"

=== Soundtracks ===
Brazil (1985) – sound engineering
The Last Emperor (1987) – co-production. The soundtrack received an Oscar for the best sound-recording and a Grammy Award for the best album.
Someone to Watch Over Me (1987) – sound engineering.
Crusoe (1988) – sound engineering.
Scandal (1989) – sound-engineering for the theme song 'Nothing Has Been Proved' with Dusty Springfield and Pet Shop Boys.
Twin Peaks (1990) – sound engineering.
Strike It Rich (1990) – sound engineering.
White Squall (1996) – sound engineering.
Victory (2009) – sound engineering.
Touchback (2011) – sound engineering.
Nocturnal Animals (2016) - mixing.
