= The Priests =

Northern Irish classical musical group

- Origin: Northern Ireland
- Genres: Classical; Religious
- Occupation: Roman Catholic priests
- Instrument: Vocals
- Years active: 2008–2025
- Labels: Epic (2008–present); Sony (2008–present); RCA (2009–present)
- Members: Very Reverend Eugene O'Hagan; Very Reverend Martin O'Hagan; Very Reverend David Delargy
- Website: www.thepriests.org

The Priests are a classical musical group, made up of three Roman Catholic priests from the Diocese of Down and Connor in Northern Ireland.

== Background and early career ==
Fr. Eugene and his brother Fr. Martin O'Hagan are originally from the village of Claudy, County Londonderry with the family now residing in Derry whilst Fr. David Delargy is from Ballymena, County Antrim.

The trio have been singing together since they boarded in the 1970s as students at St MacNissi's College, Garron Tower, County Antrim. After signing a deal with Sony BMG in April 2008, the priests, all from the Diocese of Down & Connor, recorded their debut album, "The Priests", in Northern Ireland and Rome, with the unusual honour of having been allowed to record in St. Peter's Basilica, The Vatican.

== Career ==
=== 2008: The Priests ===
The eponymous album was released in Ireland on 14 November 2008 by Epic Records and has since been released worldwide in over thirty countries and preceded by an ITV documentary and PBS special in the United States. In December 2008, they scooped the Guinness World Record for "Fastest-selling UK debut for a classical act". The debut album turned 7 times Platinum in Ireland, and Platinum in UK, Sweden, Norway as well as going Gold in New Zealand, Canada and Spain. The group's concert schedule does not follow the usual band format as clauses in their bespoke contract places the emphasis on them continuing their pastoral work in their respective Parishes and in the Diocese of Down & Connor. In the 21 March issue of The Tablet, it is claimed that the album has sold more than 1 million copies in Ireland alone.

=== 2009–2010: Harmony and Noel ===
In August 2009, they began recording their second album, entitled "Harmony", under the same production team. It was released in November 2009 and has reaped platinum awards in Ireland and Sweden, where the album reached the No 1 spot in the Swedish charts just before Christmas 2009.

The trio completed a very successful concert tour of UK & Ireland playing to packed houses and ending with a homecoming concert in Belfast's Waterfront Hall. Their concert itinerary also took in two concerts in the Millennium Forum in the City of Derry, the first concert coinciding with the release of the Saville Report on Bloody Sunday. They noted that it was an auspicious day for the city and for the future.

The trio's first Christmas album, Noel, was released 2 November 2010. The album debuted at number 3 on the US Top Classical Albums Chart and #18 on the Top Christian Albums Chart. In Canada, the album charted at number 100 on the Canadian Albums Chart and number 8 on the Canadian Classical Albums Chart.

In November 2010 they released an autobiography Soul Song: Reflections on an Unexpected Journey (Hardback). A paperback edition was released in April 2012.

=== 2011–2018: Then Sings My Soul and Alleluia ===
In April 2012, The Priests released Then Sings My Soul – The Best of the Priests featuring one new song, "Danny Boy". The group then toured in Europe, Canada and the US.

In early 2015 the Priests re-signed their recording contract with Sony Music. Their album Alleluia was recorded in 2016 and released on 7 October of that same year.

== Members ==
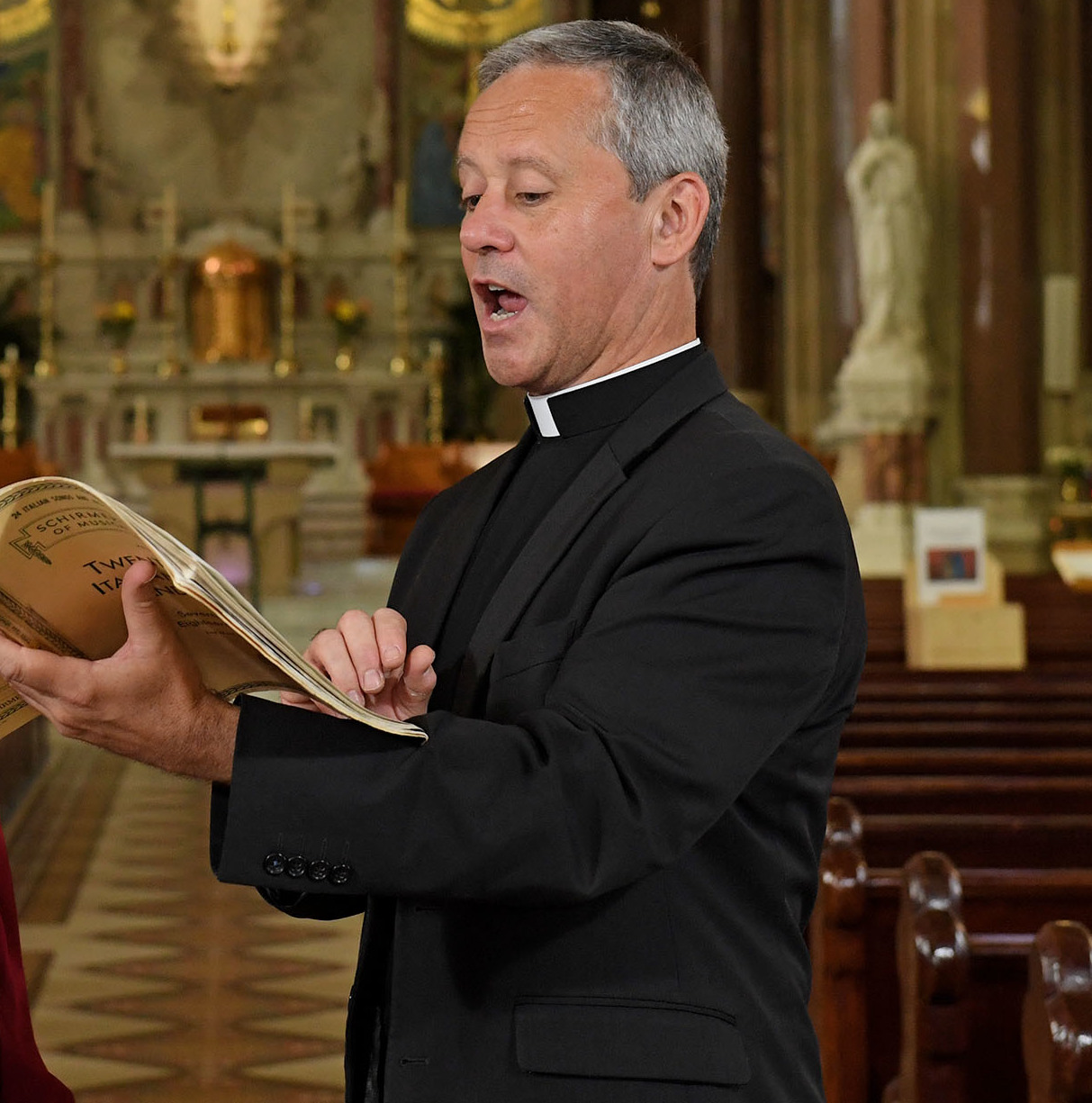
Fr Martin O'Hagan singing at Clonard Monastery in 2019

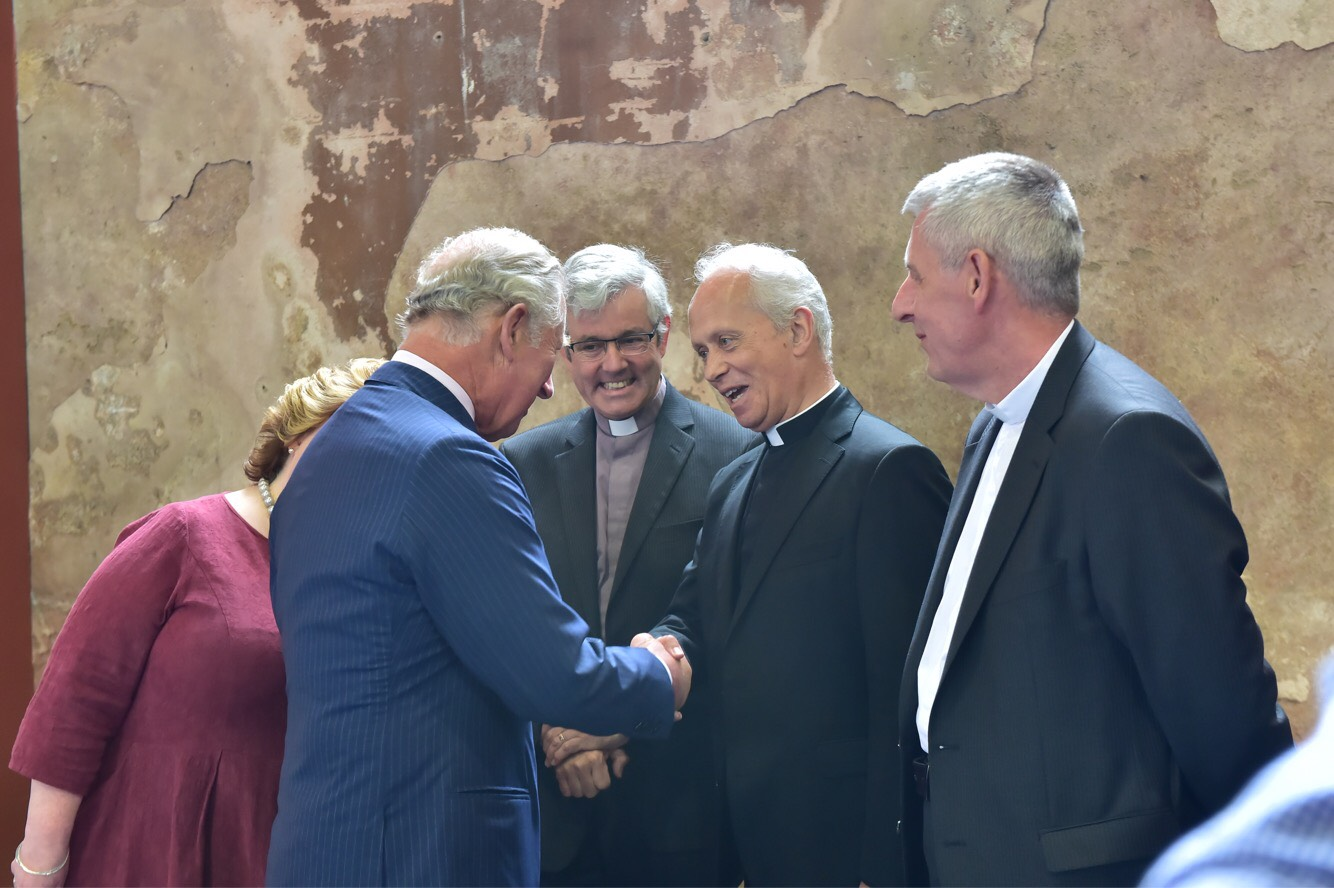
Fr Eugene O'Hagan shaking hands with the future King Charles III. Also pictured are Protestant clergy Stephen Forde and Charles McMullen

- Fr Eugene O'Hagan is Vicar General of the Diocese of Down and Connor.
- Fr Martin O'Hagan is Parish Priest of the Parish of Newtownards and Comber with two churches: The Church of St. Patrick (Newtownards) and the Church of Our Lady of the Visitation (Comber). Diocese of Down and Connor.
- Fr David Delargy is Parish Priest of the Lough Shore Parishes of Whitehouse, Greencastle and St James in the Diocese of Down and Connor.

All three were appointed Member of the Order of the British Empire (MBE) in the 2020 New Year Honours for services to music and to charity in Northern Ireland.

== Discography ==
=== Studio albums ===
Year	Title	Chart positions										Certifications (sales thresholds)
Year	Title	IRE	AUS	NL	NZ	SWE	UK	FRA	SPA	BEL (FL)	US	Certifications (sales thresholds)
2008	The Priests: Released: 14 November 2008; Label: Epic	1	6	2	2	3	5	10	7	7	66	IRE: Platinum; ARIA: Platinum; UK: Platinum; SWE: Platinum; NOR: Platinum; CAN: Gold; NZ: Gold
2009	Harmony: Released: 23 November 2009; Label: Epic/RCA	7	35	58	3	1	18	98	57	17	—	IRE: Platinum; UK: Gold
2016	Alleluia: Released: 7 October 2016; Label: SWM7	—	—	—	—	—	—	—	—	—	—	
"—" denotes the album did not chart.

=== Holiday albums ===
Year	Title	Chart positions							
Year	Title	IRE	NL	FIN	NZ	SWE	UK	FRA	BEL (FL)
2010	Noël: Holiday album; Released: 2 November 2010; Label: Epic/RCA	9	68	46	16	23	37	171	47

=== Cappella Caeciliana ===
The Priests were also founder members of Belfast-based choir Cappella Caeciliana, with whom they have recorded four albums:

- 2001 – Cantate Domino – Music of Celebration from Cappella Caeciliana
- 2005 – Sing for the Morning's Joy
- 2008 – O Quam Gloriosum
- 2014 – Reflecting Light

The Priests also recorded with Cappella Caeciliana the seven-minute work "Ut omnes unum sint" by James MacMillan, which appears on the choir's 2018 CD UNITY May they all be one, conducted by the composer.

== See also ==
- List of artists who reached number one in Ireland
