= Noël (The Priests album) =

Studio album by The Priests
- Released: 6 December 2010
- Recorded: 2010
- Genre: Classical
- Label: Epic

The Priests chronology
Harmony (2009)	Noël (2010)	Then Sings My Soul - The Best of The Priests (2012)

Noël is a holiday album, the third studio album by Catholic group The Priests. It was released on 6 December 2010 on Epic Records, and reached number 9 in the Irish Albums Chart.

== Track listing ==
1. "Ding Dong Merrily On High"
2. "The First Nowell"
3. "Sussex Carol"
4. "Little Drummer Boy/Peace On Earth"
5. "The Holly And The Ivy"
6. "Away In A Manger"
7. "God Rest Ye Merry Gentlemen"
8. "In The Bleak Midwinter"
9. "In Dulci Jubilo"
10. "Joy To The World"
11. "Silent Night"
12. "O Come All Ye Faithful"
13. "What Child Is This"
14. "Hark The Herald Angels Sing"
15. "Little Drummer Boy/Peace On Earth" featuring Shane MacGowan

== Charts ==
Chart (2010)	Peak Position
Dutch Albums Chart	68
French Albums Chart	171
Finnish Albums Chart	46
Irish Albums Chart	9
Swedish Albums Chart	23
New Zealand Albums Chart	16
UK Albums Chart	37
