= Trevor Spencer =

Australian songwriter, record producer and drummer

- Origin: Adelaide, Australia
- Genres: Pop, rock
- Occupation(s): Songwriter, record producer, musician
- Instrument(s): Drums, percussion
- Years active: 1969–present
- Labels: A & M Records, Bradley's Records

Trevor Spencer (born 21 May 1947 in Adelaide, Australia) is an Australian songwriter, record producer and drummer. He studied drums and percussion from the age of 10. By the age of 14, he was playing professionally in bands in Adelaide and Melbourne, where he met his songwriting and musical partner Alan Tarney.

== Career ==
In 1967, Trevor Spencer was a founding member of psychedelic pop-progressive rock group James Taylor Move. In 1969 he moved to Ham in England and after forming his first band, Quartet, he became a studio drummer for acts such as Cliff Richard, Marvin and Farrar and Olivia Newton-John.

Quartet recorded one album with Decca records which remains unreleased but two singles were released on Decca: "Joseph"/"Mama where did you fail" (1970) F13072 and "Now"/"will my lady come" (1970) F12974.

During the 1970s, he was a house songwriter for ATV Music London. In 1976, he was one half of the Tarney-Spencer Band along with Alan Tarney (ex-James Taylor Move). They signed a ten-album deal with A & M Records, but met with little success and after three album releases, the group disbanded and discontinued their contract with agreement by the record company.

In 1973, he was part of Cliff Richard's backing group at the Eurovision Song Contest, along with John Farrar, Alan Tarney and Terry Britten, with the song "Power to All Our Friends," which came third.

He then moved into record production and worked for many major labels as a freelance producer before moving to Perth. In 1986, he bought the Sh-boom studios in Perth with co-owner Gary Taylor. Soon after, Hank Marvin bought his own studio within the Sh-boom complex, The Nivram Studios.

During his career, Spencer has been involved in the performing, production and composing with various artists which has resulted in the sales of over 20 million records worldwide.

== Selected discography ==
=== With The Tarney-Spencer Band ===
Albums:

- 1976 Tarney and Spencer (Bradley's)
- 1978 Three's a Crowd (A & M)
- 1979 Run for Your Life (A & M)

Singles:

- 1976 I'm Your Man Rock n Roll/ (Bradley's)
- 1976 If You Knew/ (Bradley's)
- 1979 "No Time to Lose" (A&M)
- 1979 "Cathy's Clown"/"Anything I Can Do" (A&M)

Notable singles:

- 1979 Cliff Richard – We Don't Talk Anymore

Notable albums:

- 1979 Charlie Dore – Where to Now

== See also ==
- Tarney-Spencer Band
