= Antonio Ruiz-Pipó =

Spanish and French composer (1934–1997)

Antonio Ruiz-Pipó (27 April 1934 – 24 October 1997) was a Spanish and French composer and pianist.

Ruiz-Pipó was born in Granada, Spain. He studied the piano with Alicia de Larrocha and composition with Salvador Bacarisse and others. The latter part of his productive life was spent in France where, in addition to pursuing his performing career, he taught at the École Normale de Musique de Paris and the Conservatoire de Musique in Paris. He partnered with his longtime friend the violinist Serge Blanc in duos, trios, and quartets with piano with whom he toured within France, Spain and many other countries. In 1987, Ruiz-Pipó wrote for Blanc a violin concerto for string orchestra dedicated to him. In his youth he played the guitar a little, and this provided him with a working knowledge of the instrument, for which he wrote numerous works; Canción y Danza is his main legacy for the guitar. His music is not consistently tonal, evidenced by a recording by Jean Bruno Dautaner (E. His treatment and harmonization of his thematic material (often deceptively simple-sounding) is sophisticated, and he revels in sharp contrasts of mood and color. He died in Paris, aged 63.

== Legacy ==
Based on his Canción y Danza a Tamil language cinema song called "Entha poovilum vaasam undu" in the movie Murattu Kaalai was composed. The song was a hit in southern part of India.
