= Kevin Peek =

Australian guitarist (1946–2013)

- Born: 21 December 1946; Adelaide, South Australia, Australia
- Died: 11 February 2013 (aged 66) Perth, Western Australia, Australia
- Genres: Rock, classical
- Occupation: Musician
- Instruments: Guitar

Kevin Peek (21 December 1946 – 11 February 2013) was an Australian guitarist, playing both rock and classical music, best known for his work with the progressive rock band Sky.

== Biography ==
Peek was born in Adelaide, South Australia, and initially played classical percussion in the Adelaide Conservatorium of Music, before teaching himself the guitar. In 1967 Peek formed a Psychedelic pop / progressive rock group, James Taylor Move, but left by May 1968, moving to London. He returned to Adelaide, Australia, to join a newly formed rock band Quartet which, despite a contract from England's Decca Records, proved unsuccessful. An Australian single, "Now"/"Will My Lady Come" [Decca Y-8977], was released in 1969. The A-side is credited to Terry Britten; the B-side to Trevor Spencer, Alan Tarney and Peek. For a time, following their move to London, he and his fellow Adelaide bandmates—guitarist Terry Britten, bassist Alan Tarney, and drummer Trevor Spencer—made their livings as session musicians together, playing with everyone from the New Seekers and Mary Hopkin (Earth Song/Ocean Song) to Cliff Richard, whose regular backing band they became on stage and on record during the 1970s. Peek also worked with Manfred Mann, Lulu, Tom Jones, Jeff Wayne (War of the Worlds) which he contributed to as part of the orchestra, and Shirley Bassey, among others. He wrote the music for the internationally broadcast "Singapore Girl" television advertisements for Singapore Airlines.

In 1979, he joined the classical/progressive rock quintet Sky. In association with classical guitarist John Williams, keyboardist Francis Monkman, bassist Herbie Flowers, and drummer Tristan Fry, Peek played on seven studio albums with the band, before departing in 1991. Peek recorded three albums – Guitar Junction, Awakening, and Life & Other Games – but achieved greater prominence through his work with Sky and his session work with Olivia Newton-John, Kiki Dee, Sally Oldfield, the Alan Parsons Project, and the London Symphony Orchestra (in association with Francis Monkman on their Symphonic Rock: British Invasion releases). He also played on various soundtracks, including Monkman's music for The Long Good Friday.

Peek was jailed for three years in 1994 for 28 counts of fraud over a scheme in which he admitted faking information provided to factoring financier Scottish Pacific. Following a failed business venture and bankruptcy, in 2010 he was again prosecuted in Perth, on two counts of making a false statement to deceive or defraud. A full trial was originally scheduled for 2011, later adjourned until 2012 and ultimately never took place.

Peek died of melanoma in a Perth hospice on 11 February 2013, aged 66 years.
