= Herbie Flowers =

English musician (1938–2024)

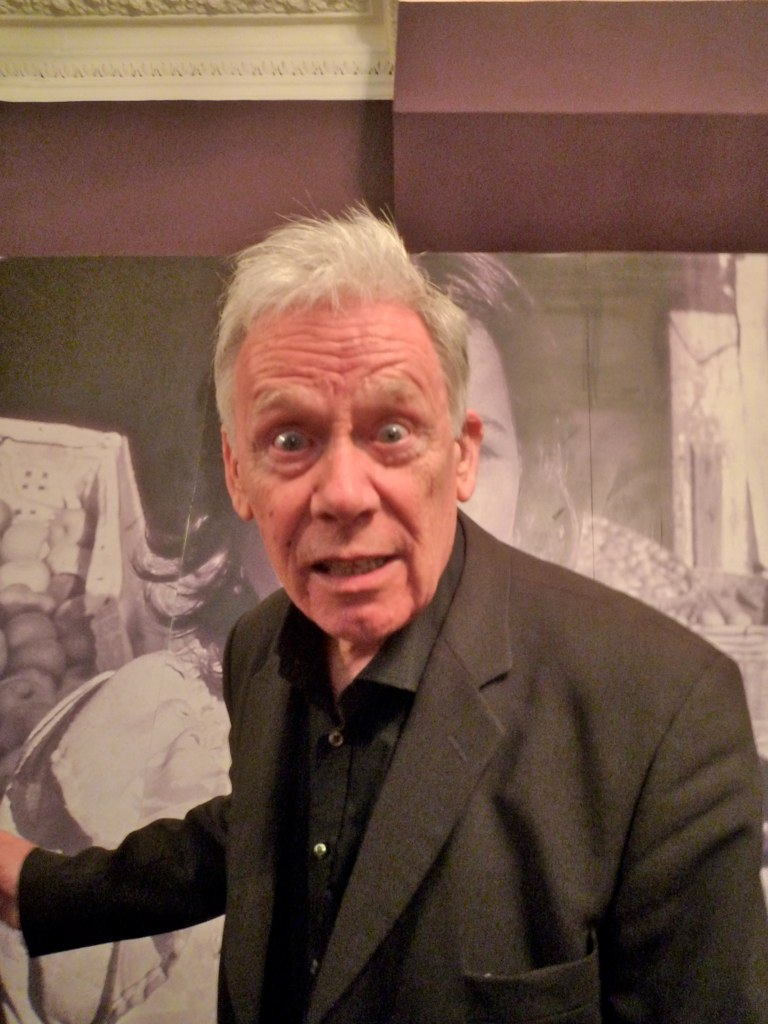
- Flowers in 2013

Background information
- Born: Brian Keith Flowers; 19 May 1938; Isleworth, Middlesex, England
- Died: 5 September 2024 (aged 86)
- Genre: Rock
- Occupation: Musician
- Instruments: Bass guitar; double bass; tuba
- Years active: 1956–2010
- Formerly of: Blue Mink; T. Rex; Sky

Brian Keith "Herbie" Flowers (19 May 1938 – 5 September 2024) was an English musician specialising in bass guitar, double bass and tuba. He was a member of groups including Blue Mink, T. Rex and Sky and was also a prolific session musician.

Flowers contributed to recordings by Elton John, Camel, David Bowie, Lou Reed, Roy Harper, David Essex, Al Kooper, Bryan Ferry, Harry Nilsson, Cat Stevens, Paul McCartney, George Harrison and Ringo Starr. He also played bass on Jeff Wayne's Musical Version of The War of the Worlds.

Flowers created his most famous bassline for Lou Reed's 1972 hit single "Walk on the Wild Side" from the album Transformer. By the end of the 1970s, Flowers had played bass on an estimated 500 hit recordings.

== Life and career ==
Flowers was born in Isleworth, Middlesex, England, on 19 May 1938. He began his musical training in 1956 when conscripted into the Royal Air Force (RAF), electing at first to serve for nine years as a bandsman playing tuba. He took up double bass as a second instrument to secure his "Junior Technician" stripe and later moved to bass guitar. After completing his military service he passed through the line-ups of several Dixieland jazz bands in the early 1960s, then discovered modern jazz. In 1965 he was engaged as a bandsman on the ocean liner Queen Elizabeth. After hearing an electric bass at a New York nightclub, he acquired his own solid-body electric instrument, a Lake Placid Blue 1960 Fender Jazz Bass that he purchased from Manny's Music in New York City for $79.

Later in the 1960s, Flowers began to acquire his reputation as a session player, working for record producers such as Shel Talmy, Mickie Most, Steve Rowland, Richard Perry, Gus Dudgeon and Tony Visconti.

In 1969 Flowers was a founding member of the group Blue Mink, playing on their song "Melting Pot" which reached No. 3 in the UK singles chart, and early heavy rock band Rumplestiltskin. He was also a member of CCS and the final line-up of T. Rex, along with Dino Dines.

In 1979, shortly after taking part in the annual A Song For Europe contest, performing "Mr Moonlight" with his group, the Daisies, he became a co-founder of the band Sky which had success in the United Kingdom and Australia.

Flowers is also known for having composed the novelty hit "Grandad" for Clive Dunn in 1970. According to Flowers, he came up with it after following an easy primer book on composing. All he needed was a hook, and he was struggling to come up with anything. He telephoned a friend, Ken Pickett, who came round, ringing the doorbell, and the sound of the doorbell provided the hook he needed.

Perhaps Flowers's most famous bassline is the one he created for Lou Reed's "Walk on the Wild Side" from the album Transformer (1972), consisting of two overdubbed simultaneous ascending and descending portamento notes, resulting in physically "impossible" double stops. The only single by Reed to reach the Top 20 in the US, it reached No 10 on the UK singles chart and was certified Platinum by the BPI. In an interview on BBC TV, Flowers said that he did this because it helped the bassline "take on a new character" because "that's what old jazzers do". It also meant he got paid a double fee for the recording. Flowers's bass hook was performed on double bass overlaid by fretless Fender Jazz Bass. He was paid a £17 flat fee (equivalent to £200 in 2025).

He played and recorded with Marc Bolan from late 1976 until Bolan's death, in September 1977, and also appeared with him on the Marc television series in 1977.

Following Sky's demise in the early 1990s, Flowers spent most of his time playing jazz. He also worked as a bass guitar teacher at Ardingly College and led many "Rockshops" at schools, helping young people to create and perform their own songs, as well as covering many others.

In 1998 session drummer Peter Boita again teamed up with Flowers to form a rhythm section in musical settings of the words of poet Sir John Betjeman on a second album they recorded together. The album was called Betjeman & Read. They had previously worked together on the Poetry in Motion album (released on Silhouette Records as MDKR 1), which also consisted of settings of Betjeman's It featuring Boita and Flowers playing with a line-up of artists that included David Essex, Justin Hayward, Steve Harley, Donovan, Alvin Stardust, Captain Sensible and Annie Haslam amongst others, with Beatles' producer George Martin overseeing proceedings. Boita and Flowers reprised their roles when Poetry in Motion was performed live for a charity show at the Richmond Theatre on 5 April 1992. Betjeman & Read was one of the last albums recorded at the RG Jones in Wimbledon. The vocal artists performing on this album include Cliff Richard, Marc Almond, Paul Young, Jon Anderson, Colin Blunstone, Gene Pitney, Leo Sayer, Donovan, Mike Read, the Rodolfus Choir and David Essex.

Over the course of his career Flowers contributed to recordings by Elton John (Tumbleweed Connection, Madman Across the Water), Camel (tuba on Nude), David Bowie (Space Oddity, Diamond Dogs), Lou Reed (Transformer, including the two prominent basslines of "Walk on the Wild Side"), Melanie (Candles in the Rain), Roy Harper (Bullinamingvase), David Essex (Rock On), Al Kooper (New York City (You're a Woman)), Bryan Ferry (The Bride Stripped Bare), Harry Nilsson (Nilsson Schmilsson, Son of Schmilsson), Cat Stevens (New Masters, Foreigner), Paul McCartney (Give My Regards to Broad Street), George Harrison (Somewhere in England, Gone Troppo, Brainwashed) and Ringo Starr (Stop and Smell the Roses). He also played bass on Jeff Wayne's Musical Version of The War of the Worlds.

During the early 2000s, Flowers joined with Sussex based classical guitarist Richard Durrant to reproduce the music he had played with John Williams in Sky, including his own composition Tuba Smarties. They released a joint album Pandora.

By the end of the 1970s, Flowers had played bass on an estimated 500 hit recordings.

=== "Rock On" ===
In 1973 English singer David Essex released "Rock On" as a single and it rapidly became an international hit. The distinctive stripped‑back musical arrangement was devised by producer Jeff Wayne. According to Wayne, only three session musicians played on the final backing track, and the most prominently featured was Flowers, whose double‑tracked bass guitar was treated with a prominent "slapback" delay effect, creating a complex polyrhythmic backbeat:

"I can recall the three musicians on the backing track for 'Rock On' all looking around in a mostly empty Advision Studios, Studio 1, wanting to know when the rest of the band were arriving! I explained there weren't any others for that track, and I was relying on them to understand my idea for the production. While the drums and percussion parts were written out, it was definitely Herbie that grasped immediately that a bass guitar playing a lead riff could fill a large part of the spatial spectrum and he took my idea and turned some basic notes of mine, into his amazing bass riff. Then to top it off, he suggested playing it again an octave higher. So you get this unusual bass sound right up front – now it couldn't have been up front if the arrangement didn't allow the air and the space to be created that way".

Flowers himself noted that, as a reward for devising the double-tracked bassline, he was paid double his normal session fee, and thus received £24 instead of the usual £12.

== Personal life ==
Flowers lived in Ditchling, East Sussex,. His neighbours included Captain Sensible and Dame Vera Lynn. In September 2009 he founded the community choir Shoreham Singers-by-Sea, which had in excess of 150 members followed, in September 2010, by the Ditchling Singers.

== Death and tributes ==
Flowers died on 5 September 2024, at the age of 86.

Tributes were paid by Tim Burgess, the lead singer of the Charlatans, who said on X: "Farewell Herbie Flowers, he made the greats sound greater" and by Mat Osman, bassist for Suede who posted: "Ah, damn. RIP Herbie Flowers. So many great basslines – imagine having played on "Space Oddity", "Walk on the Wild Side" and "Rock On"." The estate of David Bowie said that Flowers's work over the years was too long to list, adding, "Aside from his incredible musicianship over many decades, he was a beautiful soul and a very funny man".

== Solo discography ==
=== Albums ===
- 1975: Plant Life (Philips)
- 1980: A Little Potty (EMI)
- 1984: Herbie's Stuff (de Wolfe)
- 2012: A Jazz Breakfast (HF15)

=== Singles ===
- 1973: "Tramp" / "Flanker" (Polydor)
- 1975: "Mouth" / "Hi! It's Herbie Flowers" (Philips)
- 1975: "Dancing at Danny's" / "Mathematics" (Philips)
- 1977: "Jubilee" / "News" (EMI)
- 1978: "Don't Take My Bass Away" / "I Want to Be with You" (EMI)
- 1979: "Mr. Moonlight" / "I Want to Be with You" (EMI)
- 1980: "Just for You" / "The Whale" (EMI)
- 1980: "Burlington Bertie (Tramp)" / "Big George" (EMI)
- 1981: "Tuba Smarties" / "The Bathroom Song" (Ariola)
- 1983: "I Love 'er" / "Meet Me on the Corner" (Magic)

== Collaborations ==
With David Bowie

- David Bowie (Mercury Records, 1969)
- Diamond Dogs (RCA Records, 1974)
- David Live (RCA Records, 1974)

With Sam Brown

- 43 Minutes (Pod Music, All At Once Records, 1993)
- Of the Moment (Pod Music, 2007)

With Chanter Sisters

- First Flight (Polydor Records, 1976)

With Allan Clarke

- My Real Name Is 'Arold (RCA Victor, 1973)
- Allan Clarke (EMI, 1974)

With Roger Daltrey

- McVicar (Polydor Records, 1980)

With David Essex

- Rock On (Columbia Records, 1973)
- David Essex (CBS Records, 1974)
- Imperial Wizard (Mercury Records, 1978)
- Silver Dream Racer (Mercury Records, 1980)
- Be-Bop the Future (Mercury Records, 1981)
- Stage − Struck (Mercury Records, 1982)
- This One's for You (Mercury Records, 1984)

With Bryan Ferry

- The Bride Stripped Bare (EG Records, 1978)

With Albert Hammond

- Al Otro Lado Del Sol (Epic Records, 1979)

With Steve Harley

- Hobo with a Grin (EMI, 1978)
- Poetic Justice (Transatlantic Records, 1996)

With George Harrison

- Somewhere in England (Dark Horse Records, 1981)
- Gone Troppo (Dark Horse Records, 1982)
- Brainwashed (Dark Horse Records, 2002)

With Justin Hayward

- Night Flight (Decca Records, 1980)

With Elton John

- Tumbleweed Connection (Uni, 1970)
- Madman Across the Water (Uni, 1971)
- A Single Man (Rocket, 1978)

With Al Kooper

- New York City (You're a Woman) (Columbia Records, 1971)
- A Possible Projection of the Future / Childhood's End (Columbia Records, 1972)

With Paul McCartney

- Give My Regards to Broad Street (Parlophone, EL 26 0278 1)

With Melanie

- Candles in the Rain (Buddah Records, 1970)

With Olivia Newton-John

- If Not for You (Festival Records, 1971)

With Harry Nilsson

- Nilsson Schmilsson (RCA Victor, 1971)

With Hazel O'Connor

- 5 in the Morning (Mystic Records, 1997)

With Sally Oldfield

- Water Bearer (Bronze Records, 1978)
- Easy (Bronze Records, 1979)
- Celebration (Bronze Records, 1980)
- Playing in the Flame (Bronze Records, 1981)

With Lou Reed

- Transformer (RCA Records, 1972)

With Cliff Richard

- Rock 'n' Roll Juvenile (EMI, 1979)

With Dig Richards

- The Thing is . . . ? (RCA Records, 1981)

With Tim Rose

- Love – A Kind of Hate Story (Capitol Records, 1970)

With Chris Spedding

- Hurt (RAK Records, 1977)

With Ringo Starr

- Stop and Smell the Roses (RCA Records, 1981)

With Cat Stevens

- Foreigner (Island Records, 1973)

With T. Rex

- Dandy in the Underworld (EMI, 1977)

With John L. Watson (singer)

- White Hot Blue Black (Deram, 1970)

With Jane Wiedlin

- Tangled (EMI, 1990)
