= In Flight (Alvin Lee album) =

Live album by Alvin Lee & Co.
- Released: 1974
- Recorded: 22 March 1974
- Venues: Rainbow Theatre, Finsbury Park, London
- Genre: Rock
- Length: 94:27
- Label: Columbia
- Producer: Alvin Lee

Alvin Lee & Co. chronology
On the Road to Freedom (1973)	In Flight (1974)	Pump Iron! (1975)

Professional ratings
Review scores
Source	Rating
Allmusic	4.5/5 stars
The Village Voice	B−

In Flight is a live album by Alvin Lee & Co. It was released in 1974 by Columbia Records.

== Track listing ==
All songs written by Alvin Lee unless otherwise stated.

=== Side 1 ===
1. "Got To Keep Moving" - 5:02
2. "Going Through The Door" - 4:21
3. "Don't Be Cruel" (Elvis Presley, Otis Blackwell) - 2:39
4. "Money Honey" (Jesse Stone) - 3:05
5. "I'm Writing You a Letter" - 4:52

=== Side 2 ===
1. "You Need Love Love Love" - 5:24
2. "Freedom for the Stallion" (Allen Toussaint) - 6:26
3. "Every Blues You've Ever Heard" - 5:24
4. "All Life's Trials" - 2:59

=== Side 3 ===
1. "Intro" (Alvin Lee & Company) - :53
2. "Let's Get Back" - 4:58
3. "Ride My Train" - 4:14
4. "There's a Feeling" - 4:02
5. "Running Round" - 5:38

=== Side 4 ===
1. "Mystery Train" (Herman Parker Jr., Sam Phillips) - 4:42
2. "Slow Down" (Larry Williams) - 3:38
3. "Keep a Knockin'" (Richard Penniman) - 2:14
4. "How Many Times" - 2:04
5. "I've Got Eyes for You Baby" - 3:36
6. "I'm Writing You a Letter" - 4:18

Bonus Tracks not on original LP

1. "Somebody Callin' Me" - 6:26
2. "Put It in a Box" - 8:06

== Personnel ==
- Alvin Lee - lead vocals, lead guitar
- Mel Collins - saxophones, flute
- Neil Hubbard - rhythm guitar
- Tim Hinkley - keyboards
- Alan Spenner - bass
- Ian Wallace - drums
- Dyan Birch, Frank Collins, Paddie McHugh - backing vocals

Technical

- Andy Jaworski, Harold Burgon - recording engineer
- Alvin Lee - mixing
- Roger Lowe - design, layout
- Terry O'Neill - front cover photography

== Additional notes ==
Catalogue: (LP) Columbia 33187, (LP) Chrysalis 1069; (CD) Repertoire 4702, 5122 (with 2 bonus tracks)
