= Tony O'Malley (musician) =

British musical artist (born 1948)

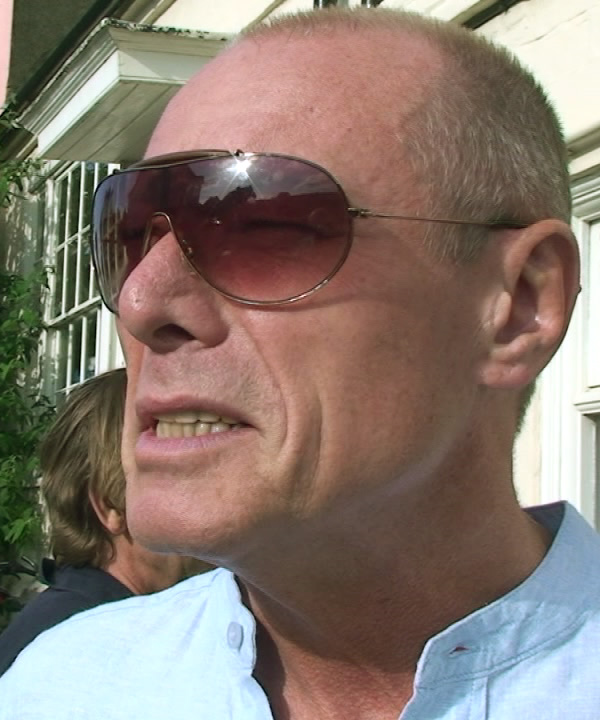
- O'Malley at The Three Mariners, Faversham in 2008

Background information
- Born: 15 July 1948 (age 78)
- Origin: Bushey, Hertfordshire, England.
- Genres: Jazz, funk, soul, blues, rock
- Occupations: Singer, songwriter
- Instruments: vocals, keyboards.
- Years active: 1968 – present
- Website: Tony O'Malley

Tony O'Malley (born 15 July 1948 in Bushey, Hertfordshire) is a British composer, singer, arranger, and keyboard player. He was the keyboardist for Arrival who had a No. 4 UK hit with "Friends" (written by Terry Reid) in 1970, and the hit "I Will Survive", written and arranged by fellow Arrival member Frank Collins. Following this he became one of the founder members of the british soul band Kokomo. He joined 10cc in 1977, after the departures of Kevin Godley and Lol Creme, and played on their live album, Live and Let Live.

O'Malley lived and worked in Georgia for four years, where he became a national television star, leaving in 2008 for his new domicile, Brussels, and returning to England in 2012. His song, "Hear My Plea", was one of the proposed songs for Georgia's 2009 Eurovision Song Contest entry. He has worked with Pino Palladino, Laurence Cottle, Andy Newmark, Hamish Stuart, Alan Spenner, Jim Mullen, Gordon Haskell Adam Phillips, Jody Linscott, Ash Soan, Mel Collins, Mark Smith, Mornington Lockett, Jeremy Stacey, Ian Thomas and Neil Hubbard.

In May 2008, O'Malley was part of the reformed Kokomo, with Mel Collins, Neil Hubbard, Mark Smith, Adam Phillips, Andy Hamilton, Bernie Holland, Glen Le Fleur, Paddy McHugh, Dyan Birch and Frank Collins, which also included performances by Eddy Armani and Franke Pharaoh.

O'Malley then formed a band, singing and playing Hammond organ, with Belgian musicians Frank De Ruyter (tenor sax), Patrick Deltenre (guitar), Frédéric Jacquelmin (drums), and the French bassist Thierry Fandant.

The current 'Tony O'Malley Band' includes Richie Aikman on guitar, Sonny Winslow on bass and Ally McDougal on drums.

Tony O'Malley is the brother of playwright Mary O'Malley, who wrote the plays Once a Catholic and Oy Vay Maria.
