= Sign of the Times (Bryan Ferry song) =

Single by Bryan Ferry

from the album The Bride Stripped Bare
- Released: 21 July 1978
- Genre: Rock; pop
- Length: 2:28
- Label: Polydor; E.G.
- Songwriter(s): Bryan Ferry
- Producer(s): Waddy Watchel; Rick Marotta; Simon Puxley; Steve Nye; Bryan Ferry

Bryan Ferry singles chronology
"What Goes On" (1978)	"Sign of the Times" (1978)	"Carrickfergus" (1978)

"Sign of the Times" is a song by the English singer and songwriter Bryan Ferry. Recorded whilst Ferry's band Roxy Music were on hiatus, it was released as the second single from his fifth solo studio album The Bride Stripped Bare (1978). The single peaked at number 37 in the UK Singles Chart, but failed to chart elsewhere. The single also features the non-album track, "Four Letter Love" as its B-side. The promotional music video was Ferry performing the song on the first episode of The Kenny Everett Video Show in 1978.

== Personnel ==
- Bryan Ferry – lead vocals
- Waddy Wachtel – guitar
- Neil Hubbard – guitar
- Rick Marotta – drums
- Alan Spenner – bass
- Ann O'Dell – piano and string arrangements
