= Frank Collins (musician) =

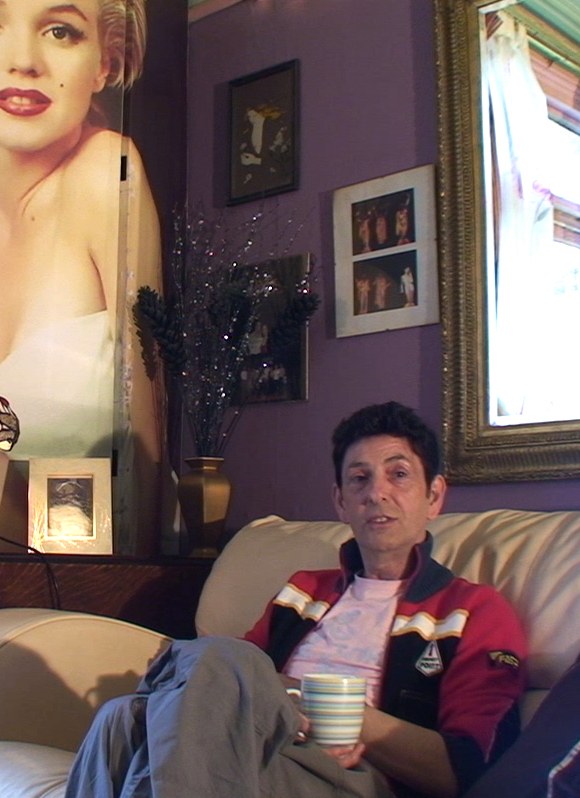
- Frank Collins

Background information
- Born: 25 October 1947 (age 77); Liverpool
- Genres: Rock, pop, blues
- Occupation(s): Singer, songwriter, arranger
- Years active: 1968–present

Frank Collins (born 25 October 1947 in Liverpool) is an English composer, singer and arranger who was a prominent member of the bands The Excels, Arrival, and Kokomo. He wrote Arrival's 1970s Top 10 hit record, "I Will Survive" (not the Gloria Gaynor song); a band that included keyboard and vocalist Tony O'Malley, vocalists Dyan Birch and Paddy McHugh, saxophonist Mel Collins, guitarist Neil Hubbard, guitarist Jim Mullen, bass player Alan Spenner, percussionist Jody Linscott, and drummer Terry Stannard.

Collins has worked as session singer and backing singer for Bryan Ferry, Terence Trent D'Arby, Marianne Faithfull, Ian Dury, Alvin Lee, Gloria Gaynor, Alison Moyet, Marc Bolan, B.B. King, and Bob Dylan.

In May 2008, Collins was part of the temporarily reformed 1970s jazz funk band Kokomo, with Tony O'Malley, Paddy McHugh, Dyan Birch, Mel Collins, Neil Hubbard, Adam Phillips, Mark Smith, Andy Hamilton, Bernie Holland, and Glen Le Fleur.
