= Mel Collins =

British musician (born 1947)

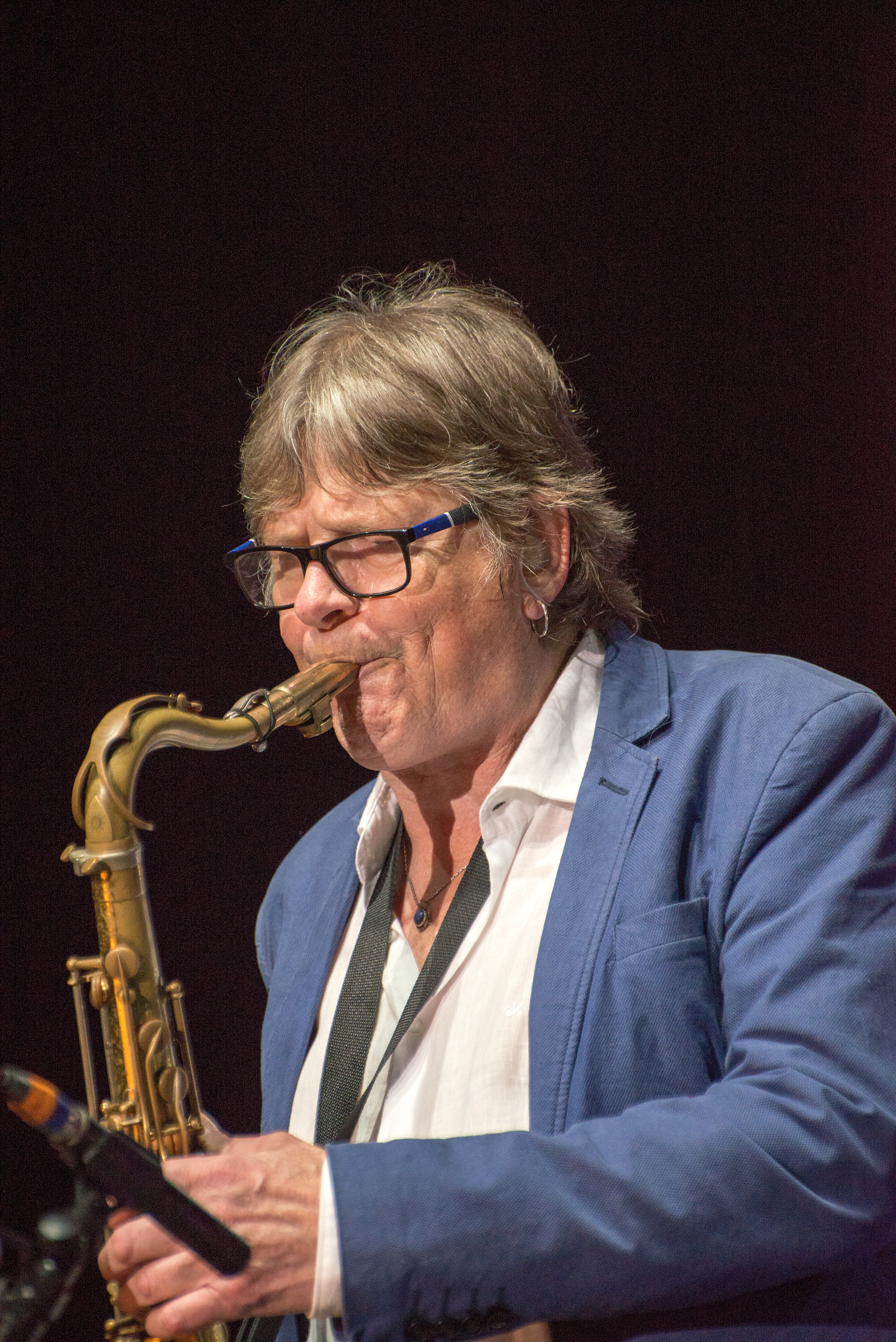
- Collins performing with Dire Straits legacy in 2022

Background information
- Born: Melvyn Desmond Collins; 5 September 1947 (age 78); Isle of Man
- Genres: Progressive rock; jazz fusion; rock
- Occupation: Musician
- Instruments: Saxophone; flute; keyboards
- Years active: 1965–present
- Member of: Kokomo; Dire Straits Legacy
- Formerly of: Camel; King Crimson; Alan Parsons Project; Dire Straits

Melvyn Desmond Collins (born 5 September 1947) is a British saxophonist, flautist and session musician.

Collins has played in several progressive rock groups, most notably being a member of King Crimson on two occasions (the first from 1970 to 1972 and the second from 2013 to 2021) and Camel (from 1976 to 1979). He has also worked with the Rolling Stones, Alan Parsons Project, Dire Straits, Roger Waters and Chris Squire. He has played in a wide variety of contexts ranging from R&B and blues rock to jazz and progressive rock.

== Career ==
Collins was born into a family of musicians. His mother was Bebe Collins a singer while his father was Derek Collins a saxophonist and session musician who toured with Judy Garland and Shirley Bassey.

Collins has worked with a large number of notable recording artists, including 10cc, Joan Armatrading, Bad Company, Roger Chapman, Child, Clannad, Eric Clapton, Pino Daniele, Dire Straits, Marianne Faithfull, Bryan Ferry, Alexis Korner, Alvin Lee, Gerry Rafferty, The Rolling Stones, Tears for Fears, Go West and Roger Waters.

He was a member of progressive rock bands King Crimson, Camel, and sessioned with The Alan Parsons Project. For King Crimson he was Ian McDonald's replacement, playing on the albums In the Wake of Poseidon (1970), Lizard (1970), Islands (1971) and Earthbound (1972). He left King Crimson in 1972, later contributing to the album Red (1974) as a session musician. He played on the Crimson Jazz Trio's second album, The King Crimson Songbook, Volume Two, released in 2009.

Collins played the saxophone solo on The Rolling Stones 1978 hit single, "Miss You", and joined Dire Straits in 1983 on their eight month long Love over Gold Tour and their live album, Alchemy. He was one of the members of Kokomo with Tony O'Malley, Neil Hubbard, Paddy McHugh, Frank Collins, Dyan Birch, and Alan Spenner, and is a frequent performer with Tony O'Malley. Collins played flute and sax solos on both Rhead Brothers albums, Dedicate and Black Shaheen (1977 & 1978).

In 1983, Collins played the saxophone solo on the hit single "Private Dancer", the title cut on Tina Turner's album by the same name. His solo was recorded in England at the Wessex Studios.

In 1984 Collins played saxophone in Pino Daniele's album Musicante, having previously toured with the Neapolitan blues man. In the same year, Collins toured with Roger Waters to support the album The Pros and Cons of Hitch Hiking. In 1985 Collins was part of the supergroup 'Willie and the Poor Boys' appearing in their video with Bill Wyman and Jimmy Page. He toured again with Waters on a second leg of the 'Pros and Cons' tour. That same year, he also appeared on the album Songs from the Big Chair by Tears for Fears, playing saxophone on "The Working Hour". In 1986 he was a musician on the animated film When the Wind Blows. He worked again with Waters in 1987, appearing on both the album Radio K.A.O.S. and the subsequent tour, and in 1988 again with Daniele on the album Bonne Soirée and the subsequent tour.

From 1996 to 2004, he was a band member on Die Harald Schmidt Show, with band leader Helmut Zerlett.

From 2002 to 2007 Collins was a member of the King Crimson offshoot group 21st Century Schizoid Band, with other former Crimson members.

In May 2008 Kokomo was reformed temporarily. With Collins were Tony O'Malley, Neil Hubbard, Mark Smith, Adam Phillips, Andy Hamilton, Paddy McHugh, Dyan Birch, Frank Collins, Bernie Holland, and Glen Le Fleur.

Collins played woodwinds on the 2011 King Crimson ProjeKct 7, A Scarcity of Miracles, appearing on a King Crimson related album for the first time since 1974. In September 2013, Robert Fripp confirmed that Mel Collins would be a member of King Crimson again, the band being referred to as King Crimson VIII.

Collins was also a member of Pete Haycock's reformation of the Climax Blues Band in 2013, prior to Haycock's death in October 2013.

Collins is currently a member of Dire Straits Legacy, a band dedicated to playing music by Dire Straits, dubbed as "the closest you’re going to get!" The band features Collins on saxophone, alongside fellow former Dire Straits touring members: Danny Cummings (percussion, vocals) and Phil Palmer (guitar, vocals), former Dire Straits members: Alan Clark (keyboards) and Jack Sonni (guitar, vocals) alongside record producer Trevor Horn (bass, vocals) as well as Marco Cavigila (lead guitar, vocals) and Primiano Dibiase (keyboards). The band have recorded on Studio album "3 Chord Trick".

== Selected discography ==
=== as Band member/sideman ===
- Circus: Circus (1969)
- The Alan Parsons Project: Eye in the Sky (1982); Ammonia Avenue (1984)
- The Byron Band: On the Rocks (1981)
- Camel: Rain Dances (1977); A Live Record (Live, 1978); Breathless (1978); Pressure Points (Live, 1984)
- Dire Straits: Alchemy (Live, 1984)
- Jakko Jakszyk and Mel Collins: King Crimson's Night (Live, 2006)
- Jakszyk, Fripp and Collins: A Scarcity of Miracles (2011)
- King Crimson: In the Wake of Poseidon (1970); Lizard (1970); Islands (1971); Earthbound (1972); Ladies of the Road (1971–72, issued 2002); Red (1974); Live at the Orpheum (2015); Live in Toronto (2015); Radical Action to Unseat the Hold of Monkey Mind (2016); Live in Chicago (2017); Music is our Friend: Live in Washington and Albany (2021)
- Kokomo: Kokomo (1975); Rise & Shine (1977)
- Alexis Korner: Live on Tour in Germany (1973); The Party Album (Live, 1980)
- Alvin Lee: In Flight (Live, 1974); Pump Iron! (1975)
- The Rolling Stones: Some Girls (1978)
- 21st Century Schizoid Band: Official Bootleg V.1 (2002); In The Wake of Schizoid Men (2003); Live in Japan (2003, CD and DVD); Live in Italy (2003); Pictures of a City – Live in New York (2006)

=== Session work ===
Collins has done session work for many different artists, among them Joan Armatrading, Bad Company, Camel, Jim Capaldi, Clannad, Bryan Ferry, Alexis Korner, Alvin Lee, Phil Manzanera/801, Anthony Phillips, Gerry Rafferty and Chris Squire.

== Collaborations ==
- Ain't Gonna Play No Second Fiddle - Dana Gillespie (1974)
- Sneakin' Sally Through the Alley - Robert Palmer (1974)
- Pressure Drop - Robert Palmer (1975)
- Let's Stick Together - Bryan Ferry (1976)
- Slowhand - Eric Clapton (1977)
- Show Some Emotion - Joan Armatrading (1977)
- In Your Mind - Bryan Ferry (1978)
- Wet Dream - Richard Wright (1978)
- The Bride Stripped Bare - Bryan Ferry (1978)
- Snakes and Ladders - Gerry Rafferty (1980)
- Celebration - Sally Oldfield (1980)
- Tilt - Cozy Powell (1981)
- Walk Under Ladders - Joan Armatrading (1981)
- Playing in the Flame - Sally Oldfield (1981)
- Sleepwalking - Gerry Rafferty (1982)
- The Philip Lynott Album – Philip Lynott (1982)
- Common Ground - Richie Havens (1983)
- The Key - Joan Armatrading (1983)
- Strange Day in Berlin - Sally Oldfield (1983)
- Private Dancer - Tina Turner (1984)
- Gone to Earth - David Sylvian (1986)
- Cocker - Joe Cocker (1986)
- Radio K.A.O.S. - Roger Waters (1987)
- Introducing the Hardline According to Terence Trent D'Arby - Terence Trent D'Arby (1987)
- Swamp - Phil Thornalley (1988)
- North and South - Gerry Rafferty (1988)
- Big Boy - Dana Gillespie (1992)
- On a Wing and a Prayer - Gerry Rafferty (1992)
- Taxi - Bryan Ferry (1993)
- Over My Head - Gerry Rafferty (1994)
- Another World - Gerry Rafferty (2000)
- Life Goes On - Gerry Rafferty (2009)

== Bands by years ==
- Eric Burdon; saxophonist:1965;1980
- Phillip Goodhand-Tait and the Stormsville Shakers; saxophonist 1966
- Circus (previously the Stormsville Shakers) saxophonist, flautist 1967–70
- King Crimson; saxophonist, flautist, keyboardist and backing vocalist 1970–72, 1974, 2013–2021
- Alexis Korner; saxophonist 1972–82
- Kokomo; saxophonist, flautist 1973–75; 2015–16
- Alvin Lee; saxophonist 1973–2000
- Bad Company; saxophonist 1974–82
- Snafu; saxophonist 1974–75
- Humble Pie; saxophonist 1974–75
- Uriah Heep; saxophonist 1975
- Chris Squire; saxophonist 1975
- Phil Manzanera; saxophonist 1975–87
- Bryan Ferry; 1976–93
- Eric Clapton; saxophonist 1977
- Small Faces; saxophonist 1977
- Streetwalkers; saxophonist 1977
- Camel; saxophonist, flautist 1977–84
- Joan Armatrading; saxophonist 1977–83
- The Rolling Stones; saxophonist 1977–78
- Richard Wright; saxophonist and flautist 1978
- Ian Matthews; saxophonist 1978–79
- Roger Chapman and the Shortlist; saxophonist 1979
- Gerry Rafferty; saxophonist 1978–94
- Anthony Phillips; saxophonist and flautist 1977–80
- Sally Oldfield; saxophonist 1980–83
- Jim Capaldi; saxophonist 1980–88
- The Byron Band; saxophonist 1981
- Marianne Faithfull; saxophonist 1981
- Caravan; saxophonist 1981
- The Alan Parsons Project; saxophonist 1982–84
- Cliff Richard; saxophonist 1982–83
- Dire Straits; saxophonist 1983
- Wang Chung; saxophonist 1983 (alto sax solo on the hit single "Dance Hall Days", from the album Points on the Curve.)
- Tears for Fears; saxophonist 1983–85
- 10cc; saxophonist 1983
- Eberhard Schoener; saxophonist:1983
- Roger Waters and the Bleeding Heart Band; saxophonist 1984–87, and played on the last shows of the 2000 In the Flesh tour.
- Go West; saxophonist 1985
- Clannad; saxophonist 1985, 1994–98
- 21st Century Schizoid Band; saxophonist, flautist, keyboardist and backing vocalist 2002–04
- Dire Straits Legacy; saxophonist 2020–present
