= Adam Phillips (musician) =

British guitarist

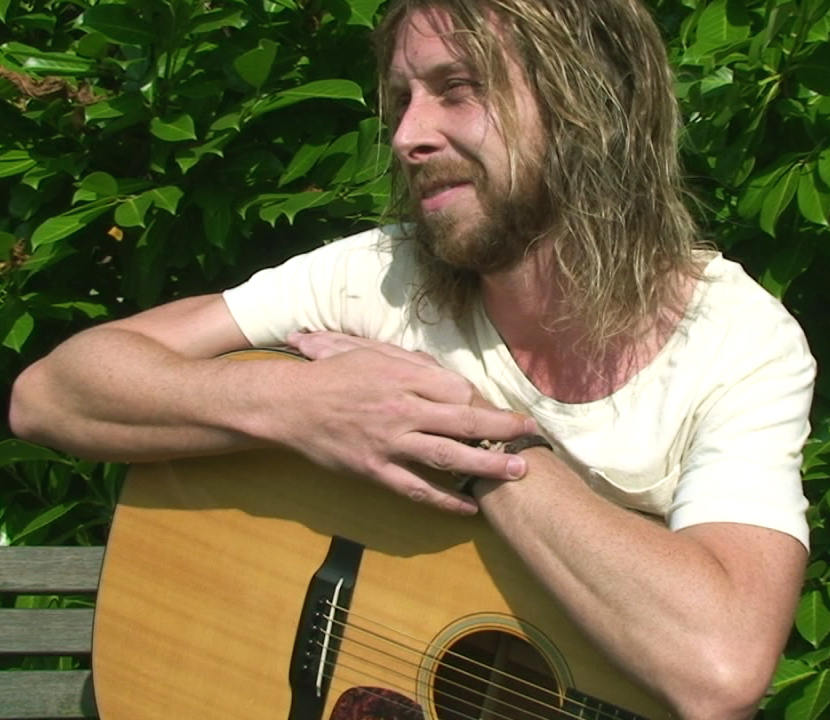
Phillips in 2008

Adam Phillips is a British guitarist.

== Career ==
Phillips has performed and recorded with Tina Turner, Dave Lewis, Ricky Martin, Steps, Britney Spears, Ronan Keating, Laura Pausini, Celine Dion, Maxi Priest, The Corrs, Shayne Ward, Boyzone, Hamish Stuart, Lionel Richie, Renato Zero, Tom Robinson, Whitney Houston, Richard Ashcroft and Tony O'Malley.

He worked on most of Cher's latest recordings. As a guitarist on Hamish Stuart's European tours, he was introduced to Cher by Stuart. Phillips was employed by Cher as a guitarist on her Believe album. He later went on to play guitar on her "All or Nothing" single (1999), and her Living Proof album (2001).

In 1998, Phillips was the guitarist on Peter Blegvad's Hangman's Hill album. Enrique Iglesias used Phillips as a guitarist on 2003's album, 7. Further work as a guitarist included The Herbaliser's Take London (2005); Just Jack's Overtones (2007); James Morrison's Songs for You, Truths for Me (2008); and in 2009 Destroy Destroy Destroy's Battle Sluts.

In July 2007, as a regular guitarist with the Tom Robinson Band, he was featured in a Tom Robinson performance at the Cancer Research Benefit in London, also including T. V. Smith. Phillips is also a frequent performer at Chelsea's (London) 606 Club, particularly with jazz musicians Dave Lewis and Tony O'Malley.

In May 2008, he was a guitarist with the temporarily reformed 1970s jazz funk band, Kokomo, with Tony O'Malley, Frank Collins, Paddy McHugh, Dyan Birch, Mel Collins, Neil Hubbard, Mark Smith, Andy Hamilton, Bernie Holland, and Glen Le Fleur. O'Malley's own band, regularly features Phillips, along with Mel Collins, Hubbard, Smith, Jeremy Stacey, and Ash Soan.

Phillips has performed and recorded as a drummer and percussionist, and has frequently been used as a backing vocalist. On occasion his work has been used in film soundtracks, including What a Girl Wants (2003).

== The Adam Phillips Band ==
Phillips' own band included:

- Paul Stacey (The Lemon Trees, Oasis, and The Black Crowes)
- Jo Burt (Black Sabbath)
- Ash Soan (Tom Robinson, Del Amitri, and The Producers)
- Mark Smith (ex-The Waterboys) (deceased)
- Mike Gorman
- Melvin Duffy
