= Kiss and Tell (Bryan Ferry song) =

Single by Bryan Ferry

from the album Bête Noire
- Released: 1 February 1988
- Recorded: 1987
- Genre: Sophisti-pop; soft rock
- Length: 4:57 (Album Version); 4:02 (Single Edit)
- Label: Virgin (UK and the rest of the world); Reprise (US and Canada)
- Songwriter: Bryan Ferry
- Producers: Bryan Ferry; Chester Kamen; Patrick Leonard

Bryan Ferry singles chronology
"The Right Stuff" (1987)	"Kiss and Tell" (1988)	"Limbo" (1988)

Music video
- "Kiss and Tell" (single edit) by Bryan Ferry on YouTube

Audio
- "Kiss and Tell" (album version) by Bryan Ferry on YouTube

"Kiss and Tell" is a song by Bryan Ferry, the lead vocalist for Roxy Music. It was released as the second single from his seventh studio album Bête Noire in February 1988, being Ferry's twenty-sixth single. The song peaked at number 41 on the UK Singles Chart and at number 31 on the US Billboard 100, becoming his highest charting single. It also appears in the film Bright Lights, Big City (1988), adapted from the Jay McInerney novel.

== Composition ==
Fans have often speculated that his song "Kiss and Tell", was Ferry's response to Jerry Hall's tell-all book about their relationship published a couple of years earlier.

== Music video ==
The song's main promotional video featured Mandy Smith and model Denice Lewis, whose photograph also adorns the single's cover sleeve. The musicians Chester Kamen (Nick Kamen's brother) and Guy Pratt also appear in the video. Also featured is Christine Keeler.

== Track listings and versions ==
UK 7" single

1. "Kiss and Tell" - 3:59
2. "Zamba" - 3:00

US 7" single

1. "Kiss and Tell (Edit)" - 4:02
2. "Zamba" - 3:00

US 12" single

1. "Kiss and Tell (Extended Mix)" - 7:06
2. "Kiss and Tell (Dub Mix)" - 5:37
3. "Kiss and Tell (Edit Mix)" - 4:02
4. "Zamba" - 3:00

UK 12" single

1. "Kiss and Tell (Dance Mix)" - 7:02
2. "Kiss and Tell (Dub Mix)" - 5:37
3. "Zamba" - 3:00

US 12" single and CD single

1. "Kiss and Tell (Edit Mix)" - 4:02
2. "Kiss and Tell (LP Version)" - 4:57

UK CD single

1. "Kiss and Tell" (7" Version) - 3:59
2. "Kiss and Tell (Dub Mix)" - 5:37
3. "Zamba" - 3:00
4. "Kiss and Tell (Dance Mix)" - 7:02

== Chart performance ==
=== Weekly charts ===
Chart (1988)	Peak position
Australia (Kent Music Report)	38
Canada Top Singles (RPM)	47
Italy (Musica e dischi)	15
Netherlands (Dutch Top 40 Tipparade)	2
Netherlands (Single Top 100)	45
New Zealand (Recorded Music NZ)	26
UK Singles (Official Charts)	41
US Billboard Hot 100	31
US Mainstream Rock (Billboard)	40
US Dance Club Songs (Billboard)	19

=== Year-end charts ===
Chart (1988)	Position
Italian FIMI Top Annuali Single 1988	100

== Notes ==
- The other versions of the song were edited by the Latin Rascals and mixed by Alan Meyerson.
