= Limbo (Bryan Ferry song) =

Single by Bryan Ferry

from the album Bête Noire
- Released: 13 June 1988
- Recorded: 1987
- Length: 5:00
- Label: Virgin
- Songwriters: Bryan Ferry; Patrick Leonard
- Producers: Bryan Ferry; Patrick Leonard

Bryan Ferry singles chronology
"Kiss and Tell" (1988)	"Limbo" (1988)	"Let's Stick Together '88" (1988)

Music video
- "Limbo" on YouTube

"Limbo" is a song by the English singer Bryan Ferry, the former lead vocalist for Roxy Music. It was released as the third and final single from his seventh solo studio album Bête Noire in 1988, and was his twenty-seventh single. The song failed to enjoy as much success as the two previous singles from the album; it peaked at No. 86 on the UK Singles Chart. It also appears in the ill-fated film Big Time, starring Paul Guilfoyle.

The song, like the other singles released from the album ("The Right Stuff" and "Kiss and Tell"), features the Smiths' lead guitarist Johnny Marr.

The promotional video for the song was directed by style and fashion guru Michael Roberts, who was a longtime friend of Ferry. The models are Nathaly Coualy and Regina Monte.

== Compilation appearances ==
As well as the song's album and single releases, it has been featured on various Ferry compilation albums, including The Platinum Collection, Collection and The Best of Bryan Ferry.

== Chart performance ==
Chart	Position
UK Singles (OCC)	86
