= Barry Kamen =

English artist, stylist and model (1963–2015)

Barry Owen Kamen
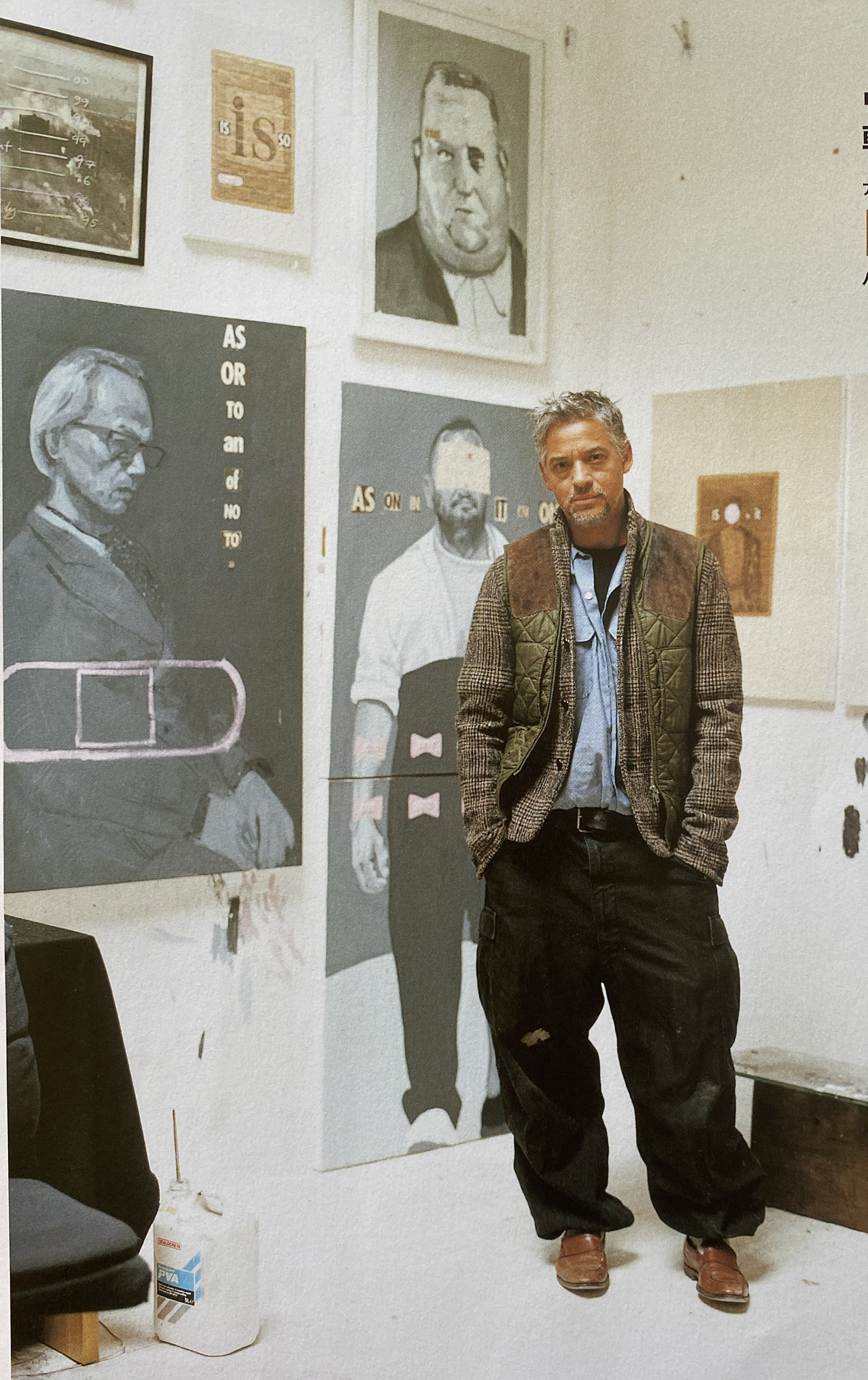
- Kamen in his studio. Photograph by Shunya Arai for GRIND magazine.
- Born: September 22, 1963; Harlow, Essex, England
- Died: October 4, 2015 (aged 52); London, England
- Spouse: Tatiana Strauss
- Relatives: Chester Kamen (brother); Nick Kamen (brother)

Barry Owen Kamen (September 22, 1963 – October 3, 2015) was a British artist, stylist and model of Burmese, Irish, Dutch and French descent. He was best known as an original member of Ray Petri's Buffalo movement.

== Early life ==
Barry Kamen was born in Harlow, England, to Zoe and Neville Kamen. He was the last of eight children, with four sisters, Sheila, Denise, Ed, Leilani and three brothers, Ronald, Chester Kamen and Nick Kamen. He attended St Marks RC Comprehensive School, and later Cambridge College of Art.

== Career in fashion and styling ==
Barry Kamen began his career as a model in his late teens. After a chance meeting with pioneer stylist Ray Petri in the early 1980s, both Barry and his brother Nick Kamen became members of the Buffalo movement led by Petri, and became his muses. The Buffalo movement was a creative and experimental explosion that included a group of designers and artists, and photographers Jamie Morgan, Roger Charity and Mark Lebon whose images of the movement would help to cement its influence. The Buffalo aesthetic was drawn from styles seen on the streets and in nightclubs of London and Petri was a pioneer in mixing sportswear with couture (something that has since become ubiquitous), also juxtaposing cultural and religious symbolism to create images of power, attitude and killer style. As Edward Enninful writes in his 2021 memoir A Visible Man, ' Buffalo co-opted symbols of strength for people who most of the world weren’t used to seeing claim ownership of anything’. As such, one of the most radical and innovative aspects of Buffalo was the use of racially diverse models that were rarely seen in editorial or advertising at the time. Such agency models were scarce so the Buffalo movement turned to the streets to find new faces, such as Naomi Campbell, who Kamen described as "this nutty girl aged about fourteen, but she was part of the crew". Modern designers continue to draw on the aesthetics of Buffalo, and in 2015, Kamen collaborated with the brand Dr. Martens to style the Spirit of Buffalo campaign.

During these years, Kamen appeared in diverse publications and catwalk shows, participating in much of the innovative, creative life of London. As fashion journalist Iain R Webb notes of the Kamen brothers, ‘Everything was going on creatively, and they were at the centre of it.’ Notable appearances were in magazines such as The Face and i-D; advertisements; catwalk shows for fashion designers such as Vivienne Westwood, BodyMap, Jean-Paul Gaultier, Yves Saint Laurent and Yohji Yamamoto; and music videos such as Neneh Cherry's "Manchild", styled by iconic jewellery designer (and close friend) Judy Blame. In 1986, he appeared on the catwalk for Comme des Garçons with artist Jean-Michel Basquiat, musicians Ben Volpeliere-Pierrot and Migi Drummond from Curiosity Killed the Cat, and singer-songwriter Richard Jobson from Skids.

In later years, Kamen was a consultant for many brands including Puma and helped to produce Usain Bolt’s looks for the 2012 Diamond League. He styled countless magazine spreads and advertising campaigns internationally. He also styled the influential 'Monarchy in the UK' series, shot by Jamie Morgan, for Arena Homme+ magazine (Fall/Winter 2009). Some of Kamen's final work as a stylist on Boxer, in collaboration with photographer Paul Vickery, was exhibited posthumously in 2016 at the Exposure Gallery on Little Portland Street, London.

Kamen was the co-editor and designer of the Buffalo book.

== Art practice ==
Kamen had always had a dedicated drawing practise and had developed an impressive handle on draftsmanship early under the influence of his father, who brought back technical drawing paper from the factory in which he worked for the children to use. Fashion shoots and important moments were all recorded in Kamen’s many sketchbooks, all of which remain in his archive.

However, in 1989, following the death of Ray Petri (which he documented in his drawing series Buffalo Last Breath), Kamen began to dedicate himself seriously to his work as an artist. His first solo show was in that same year, at Jean-Paul Gaultier’s studio in Paris, where he showed his first major series of canvasses under the exhibition title 'Treasure'. Kamen’s early work in painting is characterised by primary colours, colour blocks with black outlines, signifying a beginning in his lifelong exploration into abstraction. Early work in this style included album art for Nick Kamen (his brother, fellow Buffulo muse and Madonna collaborator), Elton John, Diana Ross, Manic Street Preachers and UB40. Kamen’s early works in film included backing films for the Rolling Stones live in concert.

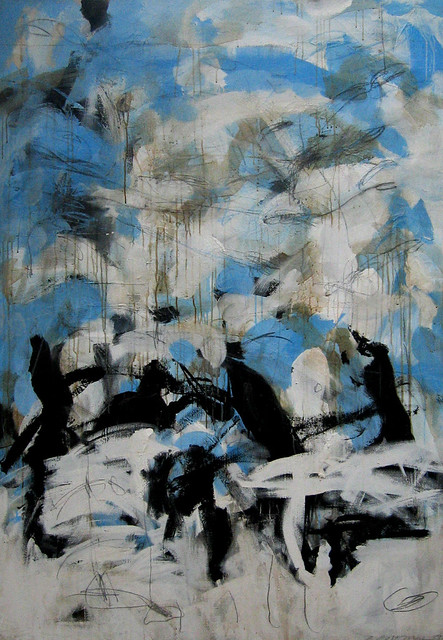
Untitled - Acrylic, coffee and graphite on canvas, 1993. From the 'Caged Waits' series of 1991-93

After his first solo show in 1989, Kamen began to hone his practise and his palette and style developed significantly. His next major series, ‘Caged Waits’ (1991–93), marks a radical reduction of his palette. The ‘Caged Waits’ works, large abstract works based loosely on the format of the human spine, are painted solely using sky blue, cream, black, coffee and graphite. This series comprise Kamen's best known works to date and can be found in many private collections. At this time, Kamen was beginning to incorporate the written word and script into his paintings and was inspired by the work of Cy Twombly, whose house he visited in Naples in the early 1990s and to whom he left a drawing; on receiving the drawing Twombly reportedly commented 'this boy can really draw'. The work Rien (1991), belonging to the legendary maverick British jewellery stylist Judy Blame, was exhibited in the Institute of Contemporary Arts in 2016 as part of Judy Blame's major retrospective entitled ‘Never Again’. It was said to have been Blame's most prized possession. Other works from these series can be found in the collections of Kate Moss, Tatjana Patitz, Johnny Depp, Naomi Campbell, Neneh Cherry, Jean-Paul Gaultier, Jean-Baptiste Mondino, Helmut Lang among others. Later major series included the 'History of England' series of 1993–4 in which Kamen explores British identity, politics and monarchy and 'And' series of 1997–1999, an extraordinary series of meticulous and detailed paintings of hands set against large, monumental crowd scenes taken from images of football crowds. He also consistently drew and painted his wife and muse Tatiana throughout his life.

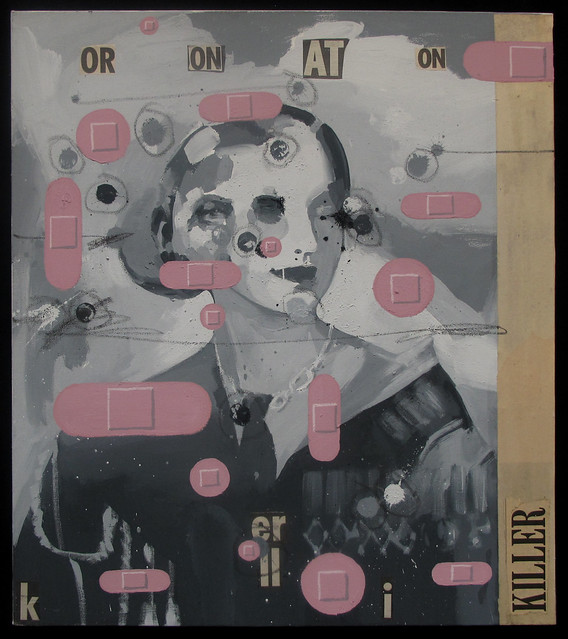
OR ON AT ON (Portrait of Elizabeth II and Prince Philip, Duke of Edinburgh), acrylic, paper collage, charcoal and graphite on canvas, 2010. From the Is Is It series of 2006-11

In 2006 Kamen embarked on another major series, the 'Is Is It' series, which lasted until 2011. An exploration into portraiture, this series turned out to be one of the final of his life. Taking inspiration from pictures created by prominent figures such as da Vinci, Velasquez, Holbein and Titian (whose work he would consistently visit in public collections throughout his life) and borrowing from the pomp, ceremony and power stances of traditional portraiture, Kamen's style deviates from traditional portraiture, painting many figures important to him both professionally and personally (Judy Blame, Glen Erler, Ray Petri, Mark Lebon, Tatiana Strauss, Johnnie Sapong, his mother, siblings, political and historical figures are among the sitters/subjects).

Combining both the abstract and the figurative, often using repeated words and phrases written or pasted onto the canvas, these works use a limited palette of greys, whites, blacks and pinks. It is at this time that the adhesive plaster (either stuck onto canvas, painted/drawn onto as a canvas, or painted onto the canvas itself) motif establishes itself in his oeuvre. As of today, this series has not yet been exhibited publicly, although in 2023 a work from this series (a double portrait of Elizabeth II and Prince Philip, based on a lenticular coronation card from 1953) will be offered for sale by Christie's, the first public sale of a canvas since Kamen's death in 2015. Kamen was working on another series of large, colourful acrylic works on paper when he died of an undiagnosed rare heart condition in his studio at age 52.

== Exhibitions ==
Kamen was famously private about his work and after his debut solo show did not go on to have any major solo museum or gallery shows. However his work was included in many important group shows of the time, including the PÖLSTAR art programme of commissioned video works, curated by Alexander de Cadenet and screened In Leicester Sq in 2000 (Kamen showed his extraordinary film work entitled 'PATriot', alongside film works by other artists including Jake and Dinos Chapman and Gavin Turk). In 2001 Kamen's work 'AND' was included in the Art-Tube 01 show on the Piccadilly Line alongside works by Damian Hurst, Gavin Turk, Yoko Ono, John Cooper Clarke, Vivienne Westwood, Fiona Banner and Juergen Teller among others. In 2016 his work 'Rien' was exhibited posthumously at the ICA as part of Judy Blame's retrospective 'Never Again'.

Kamen exhibited in further shows in London, Paris, Florence and Tokyo. He had an artist's studio at Southgate Studios in London's East End.

== Legacy ==
In 2021 the Barry Kamen Estate was founded to archive, preserve, research and exhibit his works. The Estate is under the direction of Tatiana Strauss and Glen Erler, and is curated by Florence Woodfield Morais.

=== Music videos ===
- "Manchild" by Neneh Cherry
- "Each Time You Break My Heart" by Nick Kamen
- "Nobody Else" by Nick Kamen
- "How To Do That" by Jean Paul Gaultier

=== Advertisements ===
- Jazz Eau de Toilette by Yves Saint Laurent

=== Album cover artwork ===
- Labour of Love II by UB40
- Move Until We Fly by Nick Kamen
- The Force Behind the Power by Diana Ross
- The Holy Bible by Manic Street Preachers (back cover)
