= Tony O'Malley =

Tony O'Malley may refer to:

- Tony O'Malley (painter)
- Tony O'Malley (musician)
