= Windswept (song) =

Single by Bryan Ferry

from the album Boys and Girls
- Released: 29 November 1985
- Genre: Art rock
- Length: 4:31
- Label: E.G.
- Songwriter(s): Bryan Ferry
- Producer(s): Bryan Ferry; Rhett Davies

Bryan Ferry singles chronology
| "Don't Stop the Dance" (1985) | "Windswept" (1985) | "Is Your Love Strong Enough?" (1986) |

Music video
- "Windswept" on YouTube

"Windswept" is a single performed by Bryan Ferry, the lead vocalist for Roxy Music. The track is the third and final single from the chart-topping album Boys and Girls which was released in 1985, but unlike the previous singles it did not reach the top 40 in the UK singles chart.

The track features David Gilmour, the guitarist of Pink Floyd. An instrumental version of the track appears as the B-side on the single "Is Your Love Strong Enough?" from the Ridley Scott film Legend (1985).

The UK version of the single has four tracks, with the 3 B-sides all being outtakes from the album The Bride Stripped Bare (1978); an original track ("Broken Wings") and covers of "Crazy Love" (by Van Morrison) and "Feel the Need" (by Detroit Emeralds).

The French model Laurence Treil appears in the music video directed by Derek Jarman.

The song was featured in the season 2 premiere episode of Miami Vice, "The Prodigal Son".

== Charts ==
Chart performance for "Windswept"
| Chart (1985) | Peak position |
|---|---|
| Ireland (IRMA) | 29 |
| UK Singles (OCC) | 46 |
