= Mark Smith (musician) =

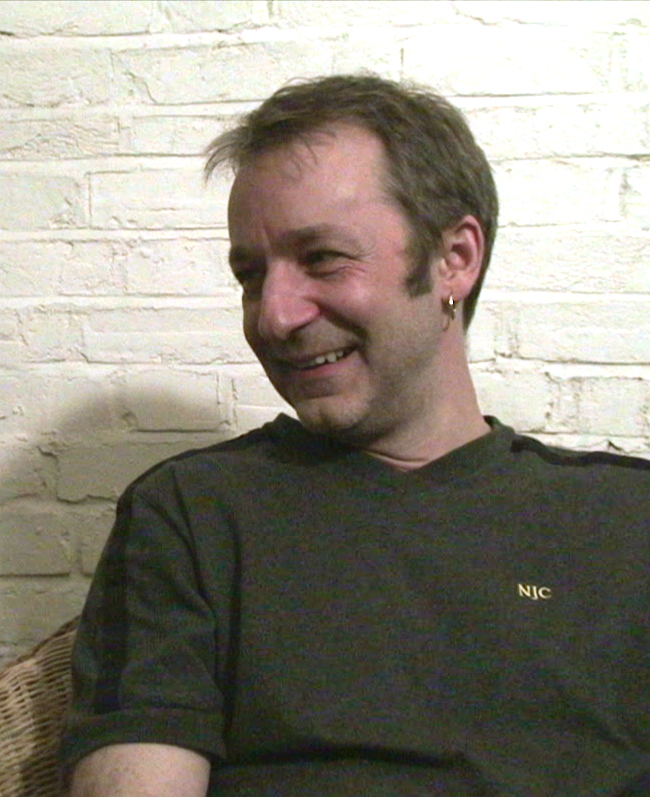
- Smith in 2008

Background information
- Born: Mark Alexander Smith; 25 February 1960
- Died: 2 November 2009 (aged 49) Battersea, London
- Genres: Jazz funk; synth-pop; folk rock; soul
- Occupations: Musician; record producer
- Instruments: Bass guitar; keyboards
- Years active: 1980–2009
- Formerly of: The Waterboys; Boys Don't Cry; Tony O'Malley; Kokomo

Mark Alexander Smith (25 February 1960 – 2 November 2009) was a British bassist and record producer, who became known as a session musician for numerous artists and also as one-time bassist for the mid-1980s synth-rock band, Boys Don't Cry.

== Career ==
Smith played bass guitar in recordings and performances with The Waterboys, Leo Sayer, Gonzales, Percy Sledge, Terry Reid, Alvin Stardust, Chris Farlowe, Patricia Kaas, Bryan Ferry, Chris Spedding, Tony O'Malley, Barbara Dickson, Shania Twain, Zoot Sims, Neneh Cherry, Lionel Richie, Ronan Keating, Malcolm McLaren, Charlotte Church, Van Morrison, George Michael and Javier Álvarez, and also produced records for young and up-and-coming British bands. Smith was the permanent bass guitarist in The Waterboys in 2009, and a frequent performer with Tony O'Malley. He had his own music performance outfit, The Futility Orchestra.

Smith was the bass guitarist with The Adam Phillips Band that included, Adam Phillips, Paul Stacey, Jo Burt, Ash Soan, Mike Gorman and Melvin Duffy.

The 1970s jazz funk band, Kokomo, was temporarily reformed for performances in May 2008. With Smith were Tony O'Malley, Mel Collins, Neil Hubbard, Adam Phillips, Andy Hamilton, Bernie Holland, Glen Le Fleur, Paddy McHugh, Dyan Birch and Frank Collins, with appearances by Eddy Armani and Franke Pharoah.

Smith died suddenly at his Battersea, London, home, in November 2009 at age 49.
