= Nick Kamen =

British singer-songwriter and model (1962–2021)

- Born: Ivor Neville Kamen; April 15, 1962; Harlow, Essex, England
- Died: May 4, 2021 (aged 59) London, England
- Genres: Pop; rock
- Occupations: Singer; songwriter; musician; model
- Instruments: Vocals; guitar
- Years active: 1980–2016
- Labels: Sire; Atlantic; Columbia; Republic

Ivor Neville "Nick" Kamen (April 15, 1962 – May 4, 2021) was a British singer, songwriter and model. He was best known for the singles "Each Time You Break My Heart" from 1986 and "I Promised Myself" from 1990, as well as for appearing in a 1985 Levi's advert.

== Early life ==
Kamen was born in Harlow, Essex, England, where he attended St Marks RC Comprehensive School. He was the seventh of eight children, with four sisters and three brothers, Ronald Kamen, Chester Kamen and Barry Kamen. He was of mixed Burmese, Irish, Dutch and French descent.

== Career ==
In 1982, Kamen appeared in the video for "The Damned Don't Cry" by synthpop band Visage. He first came to the public's attention in 1984 when Ray Petri featured him on the front cover of The Face. The cover showed him wearing a ski-hat, lipstick, orange roll-neck jumper and aviator sunglasses.

He is widely known in the UK for his role in the 1985 Levi's "Launderette" advert, where he stripped to his boxer shorts in a 1950s-style launderette while he waited for his blue jeans to wash, one of a series of Bartle Bogle Hegarty advertisements that increased sales of Levi 501s. The commercial ranked sixth in The 100 Greatest TV Ads in 2000.

Kamen's musical success was mainly in Europe. His first single was the 1986 UK Number 5 hit "Each Time You Break My Heart” from his eponymous début album. The song was written and produced by Madonna and frequent Madonna collaborator, Stephen Bray, with Madonna also singing background vocals. Her original demo remains one of many unreleased Madonna songs by the artist herself. Kamen also had a Number 16 follow-up in the UK with his second single, "Loving You Is Sweeter Than Ever" (a cover of the Four Tops' 1966 hit), although his later singles were less commercially successful in the UK but more so in the rest of Europe, particularly Italy, France, Germany, and Spain.

His second album Us (1988) was produced by another Madonna frequent collaborator, Patrick Leonard. Madonna again made an appearance with background vocals on the song "Tell Me", this time without contributing to the songwriting or production. The song was a hit in Italy in the summer of 1988, spending nine weeks at Number 1. Later in 1988 a WEA Italiana compilation Loving You, containing mainly extended versions of previous singles, reached number 7 on the Italian album charts. In 1989, Kamen performed the song "Turn It Up" on the soundtrack to the Disney film Honey, I Shrunk the Kids.

Kamen's third album Move Until We Fly was released in 1990 and contained another big European hit, the single "I Promised Myself". The song reached the top ten in several European countries and was the fourth most played record in Europe in 1990. The song was later covered by Dead or Alive (1999), A-Teens (2004), Basshunter (2009), and by German punk rockers Maggers United (2013).

His 1988 European single "Bring Me Your Love" has a Cantonese cover version sung by 張立基 (Norman Cheung) which titled "今夜你是否一人 (Are You Alone?)" reached Number 1 on the airplay chart in Hong Kong in 1989.

Kamen appeared on UK television, singing on Top of the Pops (27 November 1986 and 12 March 1987), This Morning (9 April 1990), Night Network (15 April 1987, 19 August 1987 and 1988) and The Tube (31 October 1986 and 21 November 1986). On his first appearance on Top of the Pops, he was introduced by Gary Davies and sang "Each Time You Break My Heart” and on his second appearance, he was introduced by Steve Wright and sang "Loving You Is Sweeter Than Ever”. On both occasions, his brother Chester Kamen was on guitar.

In 1992, Kamen released his final album, titled Whatever, Whenever.

Cherry Red Records released his debut album as a two-disc deluxe edition in 2015, followed by the six CD box set The Complete Collection in 2020.

== Death ==
Kamen died at his London home on 4 May 2021, aged 59, following three years with bone marrow cancer. He had been receiving treatment at Hammersmith Hospital, West London. After his death, Madonna paid tribute, writing, "You were always such a kind, sweet human and you suffered too much". Later in May 2021, Kamen's brother, musician Chester Kamen, released the track "Stories" performed by his band The Twins: "Dedicated to the memory of my two beloved little brothers, Nick and Barry".

== Discography ==
=== Albums ===
List of albums, with selected chart positions and certifications
Year	Title	Chart positions							Certifications
Year	Title	UK	AUT	GER	ITA	NLD	SWE	SWI	Certifications
1987	Nick Kamen	34	—	59	5	38	50	12	
1988	Us	—	—	—	2	—	—	—	
1988	Loving You	—	—	—	7	—	—	—	
1990	Move Until We Fly	—	4	44	9	—	15	12	IFPI AUT: Gold
1992	Whatever, Whenever	—	—	—	—	—	—	—	
2020	Nick Kamen: The Complete Collection (6-CD box set)	—	—	—	—	—	—	—	

=== Singles ===
List of singles, with selected chart positions
Year	Title	Chart positions											Album
Year	Title	UK	AUT	CAN	FRA	GER	IRE	ITA	NLD	NZL	SWE	SWI	Album
1986	"Each Time You Break My Heart"	5	25	64	8	8	3	2	5	41	6	2	Nick Kamen
1987	"Loving You Is Sweeter Than Ever"	16	—	—	—	51	18	1	13	—	—	15	Nick Kamen
1987	"Nobody Else"	47	—	—	—	—	19	—	97	—	—	—	Nick Kamen
1987	"Come Softly to Me"	134	—	—	—	—	—	19	—	—	—	—	Nick Kamen
1987	"Win Your Love"	—	—	—	—	—	—	5	—	—	—	—	Nick Kamen
1988	"Tell Me"	40	—	—	—	—	—	1	74	—	—	—	Us
1988	"Bring Me Your Love"	103	—	—	20	—	—	16	—	—	—	—	Us
1988	"Oh What a Night"	—	—	—	—	—	—	—	—	—	—	—	Loving You
1989	"Don't Hold Out"	—	—	—	—	—	—	32	—	—	—	—	Loving You
1990	"I Promised Myself"	50	1	—	11	5	—	8	4	—	1	3	Move Until We Fly
1990	"Oh How Happy"	—	—	—	—	—	—	37	—	—	—	—	Move Until We Fly
1990	"Looking Good Diving"	—	—	—	—	—	—	—	—	—	—	—	Move Until We Fly
1990	"Agony and Ecstasy"	—	—	—	—	—	—	—	—	—	—	—	Move Until We Fly
1992	"You're Not the Only One"	—	—	—	—	—	—	—	—	—	—	—	Whatever, Whenever
1992	"We'll Never Lose What We Have Found"	178	—	—	—	—	—	—	—	—	—	—	Whatever, Whenever
2004	"I Promised Myself 2004"	—	—	—	—	—	—	—	42	—	—	—	Non-album single
