= Laurence Treil =

French model and actress

- Born: 28 February 1967 (age 59)
- Occupations: Model; actress
- Years active: 1984–present
- Modeling information
- Height: 5 ft 11 in (1.80 m)
- Hair color: Dark brown
- Eye color: Blue
- Agency: Prestige (France); American Model Management (United States); Premier (United Kingdom)

Laurence Treil (born 28 February 1967) is a French model and actress. She was a famous fashion model who was also a Revlon spokesmodel during the 1980s, before becoming an actress, featuring in several films and television programmes.

== Biography ==
=== Early life ===
Treil had several health issues starting with a therapeutic abortion that specifies following this intervention had never giving birth to a child, she developed a brain tumor at the age of 10 and also had neurosurgery at the age of 26, but survived after an extended period of hospitalization.

=== Modelling career ===
In 1984, she moved to Paris to pursue a modelling career at the age of 16 and started becoming a successful fashion model, her career was managed by several modelling agencies include Prestige, American Model Management, Premier and Madison Models. Treil appeared in a number of advertising campaigns such as Mexx, Revlon, Naf Naf, Capucci, Jean Paul Gaultier and Calvin Klein, as well as the magazine covers including Glamour, Cosmopolitan, Globe and Madame Figaro.

In 1988, Treil was inducted for a Revlon spokesmodel were fronted by two American models Kara Young and Christy Turlington. She modeled for Balmain and filed a sexual harassment complaint against the president of the company in 1997.

On 17 June 2019, she visited at the Galerie Vivienne under the stylist Nathalie Garçon, initiator of the association organized a fashion show in order to improve the visibility and outlook on women over fifty.

On 22 January 2020, Treil walked the runway during the Jean Paul Gaultier haute couture fashion show for 'Spring/Summer 2020' collection, as part of Paris Fashion Week at Théâtre du Châtelet in the city's first arrondissement.

=== Acting career ===
In 1985, Treil appeared in three music videos (Slave to Love, Don't Stop the Dance and Windswept) to promote singles by singer Bryan Ferry from the English art rock band Roxy Music which were highly successful for the chart-topping Boys and Girls album. By the same year, Treil appeared in a television commercial for Vittel mineral water brand, and in the following year, she also appeared in the advertising campaign for Mexx clothing range.

In 1989, she appeared in her first major role for Georges Wilson's La Vouivre (also known as The Damned Woman in the Lake), playing the naked mythical creature in a film based on Marcel Aymé's 1943 speculative fiction novel of the same name, which also starred Lambert Wilson, Jean Carmet, Suzanne Flon, Jacques Dufilho and Macha Méril. During the early 1990s, Treil followed her two consecutive screen appearances in both French and Canadian cinema, such as 1991's Jesuit Joe and 1993's Entangled featuring Roy Dupuis, Judd Nelson and Pierce Brosnan. In 2003, Treil made her fourth and final screen appearance for Frédéric Brival's Le Veilleur, with Antoine Basler and Jackie Berroyer.

Treil had several French television appearances throughout over the years, when she first appeared in Antenne 2's Lunettes noires pour nuits blanches on 11 February 1989 was interviewed by Thierry Ardisson, as well as her second appearance in the special HIV/AIDS edition of Que le meilleur gagne on 24 April 1993, and her third appearance was TF1's Qui veut gagner des millions ? (the French version of Who Wants to Be a Millionaire?) on 6 July 2002, along with Jean-Pierre Foucault is the main host of the show.

=== Personal life ===
On 6 January 2004, she became vice president of the EVA Association which aims to assist people recovering from debilitating illness through experiences in adventurous sports, and Treil was also an avid skydiver.

On 3 October 2005, Treil was invited to Jean-Roch's birthday party at the Paris' VIP Room, along with various guests including Adriana Sklenaříková-Karembeu, Astrid Veillon, Lorànt Deutsch, Frédéric Beigbeder, Didier Drogba, Pascal Obispo and Grace Jones.

On 18 June 2007, Treil attended the Jean-Daniel Lorieux's paintings exhibition cocktail at the Salons Jacques Dessange, that included Sarah Marshall, Nora Arnezeder, Florence Darel, Alessandra Martines, Liane Foly, Pierre Cornette de Saint-Cyr and Yves Rénier. That same year (on 2 October), she enlisted in a post-show party held at the exclusive Champs-Élysées establishment as joined by Trudie Styler, as well as The Police frontman Sting with his band mates Stewart Copeland and Andy Summers were honoured by Christine Albanel as chevaliers of the Ordre des Arts et des Lettres.

On 14 March 2013, Treil visited 'The Door Club' opening a cocktail and art exhibition preview with Patrick Skatcha, Delphine de Causans and Josy Foichat.

On 13 November 2015, she attended at the second annual film and music festival in the seaside resort of La Baule-Escoublac, which was chaired by Christophe Barratier and Sam Bobino, with the festival paying a tribute to the composer Michel Legrand.

== Filmography ==
=== Music videos ===
- Slave to Love (1985)
- Don't Stop the Dance (1985)
- Windswept (1985)

=== Film ===
- La Vouivre (1989)
- Jesuit Joe (1991)
- Entangled (1993)
- Le Veilleur (2003)

=== Television ===
- Lunettes noires pour nuits blanches (1989)
- Que le meilleur gagne (1993)
- Qui veut gagner des millions ? (2002)
