= Bête Noire (album) =

1987 studio album by Bryan Ferry

Studio album by Bryan Ferry
- Released: 2 November 1987
- Recorded: 1986–1987
- Studios: Compass Point (Nassau, Bahamas); Marcadet (Paris); Miraval (Correns, France); Guillaume Tell (Paris)
- Genre: Sophisti-pop
- Length: 43:18
- Label: Virgin
- Producers: Bryan Ferry; Chester Kamen; Patrick Leonard

Bryan Ferry chronology
Boys and Girls (1985)	Bête Noire (1987)	The Ultimate Collection (1988)

Bryan Ferry studio album chronology
Boys and Girls (1985)	Bête Noire (1987)	Taxi (1993)

Singles from Bête Noire
- 1. "The Right Stuff" Released: 28 September 1987; 2. "Kiss and Tell" Released: 1 February 1988; 3. "Limbo" Released: 13 June 1988

Bête Noire is the seventh solo studio album by the English singer Bryan Ferry, released on 2 November 1987 by Virgin Records in the United Kingdom and by Reprise Records in the United States. It was a commercial and critical success, peaking at No. 9 in the UK and was certified Gold by the British Phonographic Industry (BPI).

The first single, "The Right Stuff"—a collaboration with Johnny Marr adapted from the Smiths' instrumental B-side "Money Changes Everything"—was the album's only top-40 entry in the UK, peaking at No. 37. The second single, "Kiss and Tell", narrowly missed the UK top 40 (peaking at No. 41), but made the US top 40 (becoming Ferry's only solo single to chart in the US Top 40). The song also appeared in the drama film, Bright Lights, Big City (1988), starring Michael J. Fox. The third and final single, "Limbo", peaked at No. 86 in the UK. The promotional video for the single "Kiss and Tell" features the models Denice D. Lewis (who is also featured on the single's cover photograph), Christine Keeler and Mandy Smith.

== Background ==
After the success of his previous studio album, Boys and Girls (1985), Ferry continued in the sophisti-pop style that he had pioneered since Avalon with Roxy Music, and in an attempt to give his music a more danceable sound, he joined forces with Patrick Leonard who was notable for using drum machines and sequenced synth bass in his products, and having worked with Madonna. Leonard went on to co-write five of the album's songs. Guesting on the album would be Pink Floyd guitarist, David Gilmour, session musicians Guy Pratt, Marcus Miller, David Williams, Abraham Laboriel, as well as Roxy Music's former touring musicians, guitarist Neil Hubbard and drummer Andy Newmark.

Fans, and critics have often speculated that the song "Kiss and Tell", was Ferry's response to Jerry Hall's tell-all book about their relationship published a couple of years earlier.

== Lawsuits with E.G. Records ==
Prior to the release of the album, Ferry claimed that his recording agreement with the label E.G. ended in March 1987 and that he was in a position to sell his new album to any company. E.G. said that he was in breach of a 15-year contract which gave them exclusive rights to market the album in Canada and the United States. The action was heard at the High Court of Justice in London, and in a preliminary hearing, the parties agreed that if the album were to be released before the main hearing, Ferry was to pay a third of the royalties into a joint account with E.G. – which they would receive if they were to win the case. E.G. later won the case and they marketed the album in Canada and the United States.

The album was released in the United States by Reprise Records, and debuted on the Billboard chart November 21, 1987, spending 31 weeks on the chart, peaking at No. 63.

== 1988–89 tour ==
Ferry toured Australia, Japan, United States, Canada, and Europe to promote the album. The Edge from U2 joined Ferry on stage at the Dublin show to perform the Irish folk song, "Carrickfergus" (which Ferry had previously recorded in 1978 for The Bride Stripped Bare) and Johnny Marr joined the backing band for "The Right Stuff" at the Manchester show. Roxy Music saxophonist and oboist Andy MacKay also joined the backing band for a few songs at the London Palladium and Wembley Arena dates.

Several of the songs from the Glasgow show were included on several Bryan Ferry CD singles between 1993 and 1995.

=== Line-up ===
- Bryan Ferry – lead vocals
- Clifford Carter – keyboards
- Neil Hubbard – guitars
- Jeff Thall – guitars
- Chester Kamen – guitars (1989 dates only)
- Luico Hopper – bass
- Andy Newmark – drums
- Steve Scales – percussion
- Michelle Cobbs – backing vocals
- Ednah Holt – backing vocals
- Yanick Étienne – backing vocals
- Andy Mackay – saxophones (guest at the London dates)

Tour dates
- 2 August 1988 – Poughkeepsie, New York, US
- 3 August 1988 – New Haven, Connecticut, US
- 5 August 1988 – Philadelphia, US
- 6 August 1988 – Boston, US
- 7 August 1988 – Woodbridge, California, US
- 9 August 1988 – Radio City Music Hall, New York, US
- 10 August 1988 – Radio City Music Hall, New York, US
- 11 August 1988 – Radio City Music Hall, New York, US
- 13 August 1988 – Chrysler Hall, Norfolk, US
- 14 August 1988 – Atlanta, Georgia, US
- 15 August 1988 – Washington, D.C., US
- 17 August 1988 – Toronto, Ontario, Canada
- 18 August 1988 – Montreal, Canada
- 20 August 1988 – Quebec City, Canada
- 21 August 1988 – Ottawa, Canada
- 23 August 1988 – Cleveland, US
- 24 August 1988 – Detroit, US
- 26 August 1988 – Milwaukee, US
- 27 August 1988 – Chicago, US
- 28 August 1988 – Chicago, US
- 30 August 1988 – Minneapolis, US
- 31 August 1988 – Winnipeg, Canada
- 2 September 1988 – Calgary, Canada
- 3 September 1988 – Edmonton, Canada
- 5 September 1988 – Vancouver, Canada
- 6 September 1988 – Seattle, US
- 8 September 1988 – Sacramento, US
- 9 September 1988 – Berkeley, US
- 10 September 1988 – Santa Barbara, US
- 12 September 1988 – Denver, US
- 13 September 1988 – Phoenix, US
- 16 September 1988 – San Diego, US
- 18 September 1988 – Los Angeles, US
- 19 September 1988 – Los Angeles, US
- 11 October 1988 – Nippon Budokan, Tokyo, Japan
- 12 October 1988 – NHK Hall, Tokyo, Japan
- 13 October 1988 – Nagoya City Hall, Nagoya, Japan
- 15 October 1988 – Cultural Hall Shikoku, Japan
- 17 October 1988 – Nippon Budokan, Tokyo, Japan
- 18 October 1988 – Department of Education Hall Osaka, Japan
- 20 October 1988 – Department of Education Hall Osaka, Japan
- 21 October 1988 – Kawasaki Cultural Hall, Yokohama, Japan
- 25 October 1988 – USA Super Top Tent Auckland, New Zealand
- 29 October 1988 – World Expo 88, Brisbane, Australia
- 31 October 1988 – Entertainment Centre Sydney, Australia
- 1 November 1988 – Entertainment Centre Sydney, Australia
- 4 November 1988 – National Tennis Centre, Melbourne, Australia
- 7 November 1988 – Festival Theatre Adelaide, Australia
- 8 November 1988 – Festival Theatre Adelaide, Australia
- 11 November 1988 – Entertainment Centre Perth, Australia
- 17 November 1988 – Sporthalle Hamburg, Germany
- 19 November 1988 – Isstadion Stockholm, Sweden
- 22 November 1988 – Paris, France
- 23 November 1988 – Ahoy Rotterdam, Holland
- 27 November 1988 – ICC Berlin, Germany
- 28 November 1988 – Phillipshalle Düsseldorf, Germany
- 2 December 1988 – Palasport Firenze, Italy
- 4 December 1988 – Palaeur Rome, Italy
- 6 December 1988 – Olympiahalle, Munich, Germany
- 7 December 1988 – Alte Oper, Frankfurt, Germany
- 8 December 1988 – Vorst Nationaal, Brussels, Belgium
- 10 December 1988 – SECC, Glasgow, Scotland
- 11 December 1988 – G-MEX Centre, Manchester, England
- 13 December 1988 – Royal Dublin Showground, Ireland
- 15 December 1988 – London Palladium, England
- 16 December 1988 – London Palladium, England
- 13 January 1989 – National Exhibition Centre, Solihull, England
- 14 January 1989 – National Exhibition Centre, Solihull, England
- 16 January 1989 – Wembley Arena, London, England
- 17 January 1989 – Wembley Arena, London, England
- 19 January 1989 – Wembley Arena, London, England
- 20 January 1989 – Wembley Arena, London, England

== Video release ==
Cover art for the video release

The Bête Noire Tour movie was released 10 November 2008 by the EMI Productions studio. The DVD features a pair of solo performances by Bryan Ferry, the first performance previously released as New Town, was filmed during his 1988–89 Bête Noire European Tour. The bonus show is the previously unavailable Virgin Germany 20th Birthday concert in Munich in 2002.

== Critical reception ==
Professional ratings
Review scores
Source	Rating
AllMusic	link
New Musical Express	6/10
Robert Christgau	(C+) Jan. 26, 1988
Rolling Stone	link

Reviewing retrospectively for AllMusic, critic Ned Raggett wrote of the album, "Bête Noire sparkles as the highlight of Ferry's post-Roxy solo career, adding enough energy to make it more than Boys and Girls part two. Here, his trademark well-polished heartache strikes a fine balance between mysterious moodiness and dancefloor energy, and Leonard adds more than a few tricks that keep the pep up." The critic Robert Christgau wrote of the album, "As with Mick Jagger, of all people, the signal that self-imitation has sunk into self-parody is enunciatory ennui—vocal mannerisms that were once ur-posh are now just complacent." Billboard wrote of the album, "Former Roxy Music maestro's much-awaited follow-up to "Boys And Girls" harbingers well for his new association with Reprise. Like past Ferry solo efforts, this displays the singer/writer's usual suaveness; tunes hinge on his familiar theme of l'amour moderne on the rocks. Tracks are uniformly solid, although "Kiss & Tell" and "Seven Deadly Sins" stand out."

Anthony DeCurtis reviewed the album for Rolling Stone and wrote "Bête Noire is another step in Ferry's retreat from distinct songs into atmosphere and feel. The strategy can sometimes work wonderfully, as Ferry proved on the transcendent album Avalon from Roxy Music. But as his voice sinks more deeply into the murky layers of his music, as his lyrics are reduced to a Morse code of refined despair and his subjects recede into the mist, Ferry seems increasingly like Narcissus, enraptured by his own reflection in the pond - and the bottomless depth below." Mark Coleman reviewing for the Rolling Stone Album Guide stated "Bête Noire could use one solid melody. As hushed and haunted as ever, Ferry's deeply evocative voice nevertheless gets lost amid the grandiose and antiseptic musical trappings of the digital recording era. Bête Noire is depressingly tasteful and restrained—state-of-the-art rock wallpaper." Ira Robbins of the Trouser Press commented "The similarly restrained Bête Noire confirms Ferry's commitment to innocuous sophistication. That wonderful voice is his sole asset: what he's singing is all but irrelevant. But this record's stronger melodic development and a wider variety of danceable tempos than on Boys and Girls are palpable signs of life; the involvement of ex-Smiths guitarist Johnny Marr as a player and the co-writer of one near-exciting song ("The Right Stuff") is another positive touch. In the end, given one's diminished expectations,"Limbo," "Kiss and Tell" and "Day for Night" are coolly inviting and likable enough.

== Track listing ==
All tracks are written by Bryan Ferry and Patrick Leonard, except where noted.

Side one
No.	Title	Writer(s)	Length
1.	"Limbo"		5:00
2.	"Kiss and Tell"	Ferry	4:57
3.	"New Town"	Ferry	4:50
4.	"Day for Night"		5:35
5.	"Zamba"		3:00

Side two
No.	Title	Writer(s)	Length
6.	"The Right Stuff"	Ferry; Johnny Marr	4:25
7.	"Seven Deadly Sins"	Ferry; Chester Kamen; Guy Pratt	5:10
8.	"The Name of the Game"		5:28
9.	"Bête Noire"		4:53
Total length:			43:18

Australian/New Zealand tour edition bonus tracks
No.	Title	Length
10.	"The Right Stuff" (12" Mix)	6:31
11.	"Kiss and Tell" (Dance Mix)	7:08
12.	"Limbo" (Latin Mix)	6:39
13.	"Bête Noire" (Instrumental)	4:59

== Personnel ==
The names of the musicians who performed on the album are mentioned in the liner notes, their instruments and the exact songs on which they play are not. The following list tentatively mentions the instruments the same musicians have played on other Ferry records.

=== Musicians ===
- Bryan Ferry – lead vocals, keyboards, acoustic piano
- Patrick Leonard – keyboards, synthesizers
- David Gilmour – guitars
- Neil Hubbard – guitars
- Dann Huff – guitars
- Chester Kamen – guitars
- Johnny Marr – guitars
- Bill Ruppert – guitars
- David Williams – guitars
- Abraham Laboriel – bass
- Marcus Miller – bass
- Guy Pratt – bass
- Vinnie Colaiuta – drums
- Andy Newmark – drums
- John Robinson – drums
- Rhett Davies – drum machines
- Paulinho da Costa – percussion
- Jimmy Maelen – percussion
- Courtney Pine – saxophones
- Dan Wilensky – saxophones
- Mario Abramovich – violin
- José Libertella – bandoneon
- Luis Stazo – bandoneon
- Tawatha Agee – backing vocals
- Michelle Cobbs – backing vocals
- Yanick Étienne – backing vocals
- Siedah Garrett – backing vocals
- Paul Johnson – backing vocals
- Albert Sanchez – backing vocals
- Fonzi Thornton – backing vocals

=== Technical ===
- All songs produced by Bryan Ferry and Patrick Leonard; Except "Kiss and Tell", "New Town", "The Right Stuff" and "Seven Deadly Sins" produced by Bryan Ferry, Patrick Leonard and Chester Kamen.
- Executive Producer – Simon Puxley
- Recording Engineers – Ian Eales, Steve Jackson and Kevin Killen.
- Mixed by Bruce Lampcov and Alan Meyerson
- Mastered by Bob Ludwig at Masterdisk (New York).
- Photography – Alistair Thain
- Tracks 1, 4, 5, 8 and 9 published by Virgin Music (Publishers) Ltd. and Johnny Yuma Music.
- Tracks 2 and 3 published by Virgin Music (Publishers) Ltd.
- Track 6 published by Virgin Music (Publishers) Ltd. and Warner Brothers Music Ltd.
- Track 7 published by Virgin Music (Publishers) Ltd., Warner Brothers Music Ltd. and Copyright Control.

== Charts ==
Chart performance for Bête Noire
Chart (1987–1988)	Peak position
Australian Albums (Kent Music Report)	20
Canada Top Albums/CDs (RPM)	23
Dutch Albums (Album Top 100)	15
European Albums (Music & Media)	9
Finnish Albums (Suomen virallinen lista)	16
German Albums (Offizielle Top 100)	21
Italian Albums (Musica e dischi)	17
New Zealand Albums (RMNZ)	11
Norwegian Albums (VG-lista)	10
Swedish Albums (Sverigetopplistan)	6
Swiss Albums (Schweizer Hitparade)	21
UK Albums (Official Charts)	9
US Billboard 200	63

== Certifications ==
Certifications for Bête Noire
Region	Certification	Certified units/sales
United Kingdom (BPI)	Gold	100,000^{^}
^{^} Shipments figures based on certification alone.
