= The Grease Band =

British rock band associated with Joe Cocker (1968–1975)

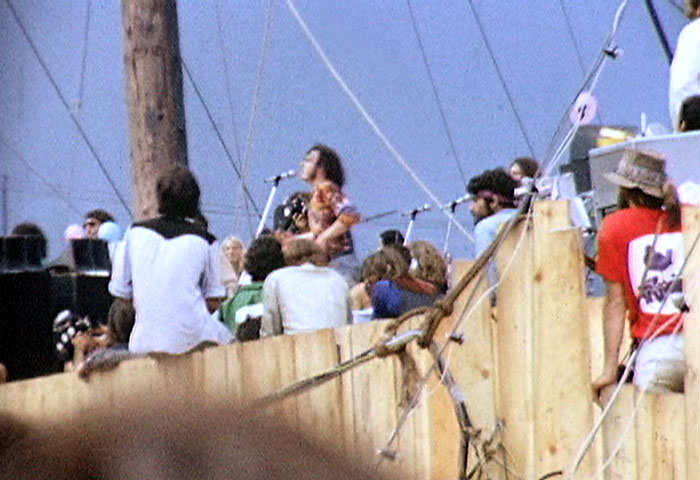
- The Grease Band performing at Woodstock in 1969

Background information
- Genres: Blues rock; psychedelic rock; acid rock; progressive rock (later)
- Years active: 1968–1975
- Spinoffs: Kokomo
- Past members: Joe Cocker; Chris Stainton; Bruce Rowland; Alan Spenner; Neil Hubbard; Henry McCullough

The Grease Band was a British rock band that originally formed as Joe Cocker's backing group. They appeared with Cocker during the 1960s, including his performance at the Woodstock Festival in August 1969. The band's name derived from an interview Cocker had read with the American jazz organist Jimmy Smith, who had approvingly described another performer as having "a lot of grease", with "grease" referring to soul. After Cocker formed the Mad Dogs & Englishmen album band line-up, the group released two albums without him in the 1970s.

Their keyboard player was Chris Stainton, who went on to tour extensively with Eric Clapton. Bassist Alan Spenner and rhythm guitarist Neil Hubbard went on to play in the UK blue-eyed soul band Kokomo; following this, the pair worked in support of the late 1970s/early 1980s incarnation of Roxy Music. Drummer Bruce Rowland later joined Fairport Convention. Henry McCullough was the Grease Band's lead guitarist, a role he later occupied in Paul McCartney's Wings, and continued as a solo artist until his death in June 2016. Rowland, Spenner, Hubbard and McCullough all played on the original 1970 recording of Jesus Christ Superstar.

== Personnel ==
Original Members

- Chris Stainton – keyboards
- Bruce Rowland – drums, percussions, harmonium, backing vocals (died 2015)
- Alan Spenner – bass, vocals (died 1991)
- Neil Hubbard – rhythm & slide guitar, backing vocals
- Henry McCullough – lead guitar, vocals, mandolin (died 2016)

Musicians credited on Amazing Grease

- Mel Collins – saxophones
- Terry Stannard – drums (died 2019)
- Mick Weaver – keyboards

== Discography ==
- The Grease Band (Shelter/Harvest, 1971) - US #190 AUS #40
- Amazing Grease (Goodear, 1975)
- On Air (Virgin/Strange Fruit, 1997) – With Joe Cocker
