= Neil Hubbard =

British guitarist (born 1948)

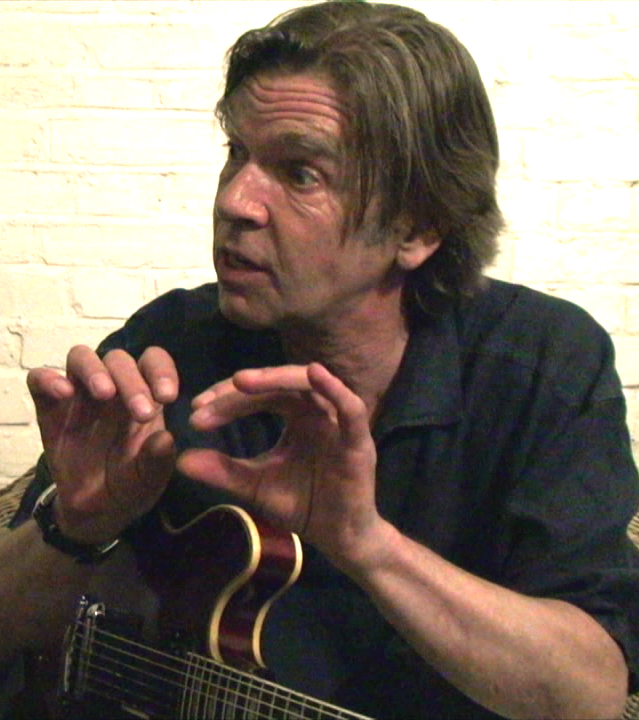
- Hubbard in 2008

Background information
- Born: 24 February 1948 (age 78)
- Origin: Peterborough, Cambridgeshire, England
- Genres: Jazz; funk; pop; rock
- Occupation: Guitarist
- Years active: 1968–present
- Member of: Kokomo
- Formerly of: The Grease Band; Bluesology; Roxy Music

Neil Terrence Hubbard (born 24 February 1948) is a British guitarist who has performed with Juicy Lucy, The Grease Band, Bluesology, Joe Cocker, Roxy Music, Kokomo, Alvin Lee, B.B. King, Kevin Rowland, Dexys Midnight Runners, Bryan Ferry and Tony O'Malley, and played on the original 1970 concept album Jesus Christ Superstar.

== Biography ==
Hubbard was educated at King's School, Peterborough, where he was a boarder. He and another pupil were budding guitarists who built their own amplifiers using plans designed by a fellow boarder and electronics wizard named Wright. The duo would entertain their chums with renditions of songs such as Tommy Roe's "Sheila" and Buddy Holly's "Peggy Sue".

Hubbard's association with Bryan Ferry began during the sessions that formed the Let's Stick Together album, where Hubbard played guitar on a re-recording of Roxy Music's "Casanova". Hubbard's guitar playing can also be heard on Roxy Music's Flesh and Blood and Avalon albums. He played with the band during the 1980 and 1982 tours. The 1982 tour can be heard on the live album Heart Still Beating (and also the live DVD The High Road). Hubbard also played in Ferry's band at Live Aid, the 1988 tour (available on the DVD, Bryan Ferry The Bete Noire Tour) and on the 1994–95 tour.

His guitar work can be heard on Ferry's Boys And Girls, Bête Noire, Taxi and Mamouna albums. The guitar solo at the end of Ferry's hit single, "Slave to Love", featured Hubbard.

In May 2008, the 1970s jazz funk band Kokomo was temporarily reformed. With Hubbard were O'Malley, Mel Collins, Mark Smith, Adam Phillips, Andy Hamilton, Bernie Holland, Glen Le Fleur, Paddy McHugh, Dyan Birch, and Frank Collins. Franke Pharoah and Eddy Armani also performed.

== Discography ==
With Bluesology

Singles:

- Come Back, Baby/Times Getting Tougher Than Tough (1965)
- Mr. Frantic/Every Day I Have the Blues (1966)
- Since I Found You Baby/Just a little bit (1967)

With Joe Cocker

- Joe Cocker (A&M Records, 1972)

With Dexys

- One Day I'm Going To Soar (BMG Rights, 2012)

With Donovan

- Essence to Essence (Epic Records, 1973)

With Bryan Ferry

- Let's Stick Together (E.G. Records, 1976)
- In Your Mind (E.G. Records, 1977)
- The Bride Stripped Bare (E.G. Records, 1978)
- Boys and Girls (E.G. Records, 1985)
- Taxi (Virgin Records, 1993)
- Mamouna (Virgin Records, 1994)
- Olympia (Virgin Records, 2010)
- Avonmore (BMG, 2014)

With Carol Grimes

- Carol Grimes (Decca Records, 1976)

With Eddie Harris

- E.H. in the U.K. (Atlantic Records, 1973)

With Johnny Hates Jazz

- Turn Back the Clock (Virgin, 1988)

With B. B. King

- Deuces Wild (MCA Records, 1997)

With Alvin Lee

- In Flight (Columbia, 1974)

With Robert Palmer

- Double Fun (Island Records, 1978)

With Maggie Reilly

- Elena (EMI, 1996)

With Roxy Music

- Flesh and Blood (E.G. Records, 1980)
- Avalon (E.G. Records, 1982)

With Paul Young

- Other Voices (Columbia Records, 1990)
- The Crossing (Columbia Records, 1993)
