= Kokomo (band) =

British soul band

- Origin: London, England
- Genres: Soul; funk
- Years active: 1973–1991; 2008–2009; 2014–present
- Members: Frank Collins; Tony O'Malley; Neil Hubbard; Mel Collins; Jim Mullen; Jody Linscott; Jennifer Maidman; Helena-May Harrison; Andy Treacey
- Past members: Dyan Birch; Alan Spenner; Terry Stannard; Glenn LeFleur; Tony Beard; John McKenzie; Chris Mercer; Andy Hamilton; Mark Smith; Neal Wilkinson; Neil Conti; Adam Phillips; Bernie Holland; Paddy McHugh Frank Tontoh
- Website: http://www.kokomo.band

Kokomo are a British band whose members were prime exponents of British soul in the 1970s. They released three albums, and the second Rise & Shine was described as "the finest British funk album of the 1970s".

== Formation and personnel ==
Formed in May 1973 by Tony O'Malley and Terry Stannard, ex-members of the pop group Arrival, Kokomo's ten-piece line-up became: Dyan Birch (vocals), Frank Collins (vocals), Paddy McHugh (vocals), Tony O'Malley (keyboards, vocals), Alan Spenner (bass, vocals), Neil Hubbard (guitar), Mel Collins (saxophone), Jody Linscott (percussion), Terry Stannard (drums) and Jim Mullen (guitar). Spenner and Hubbard were from the Grease Band, Birch, McHugh, Collins and O'Malley from Arrival and Mel Collins from King Crimson. Kokomo's first performance was at The Pheasantry, King's Road, Chelsea, in 1973, where the band's roadie Franky Blackwell coined the band's name. Kokomo built an early reputation in the UK pub rock scene. Linscott joined when the band played at Dingwalls and she performed with them whilst working there as a waitress.

Musicians who played with the band at different times included: Glenn LeFleur (drums), Tony Beard (drums), John McKenzie (bass), Chris Mercer (saxophone), Andy Hamilton (saxophone), Mark Smith (bass), Neal Wilkinson (drums) and Neil Conti (drums).

== Kokomo album and Bob Dylan ==
The band's first album Kokomo (1975) was hailed by the NME as the best debut by a British band for several years. Inspired by the tight disciplined playing of Spenner and Hubbard, Kokomo was unusual among white soul bands, for its use of four featured vocalists. In 1975, Bob Dylan recruited the band to help record his Desire album. One song featuring the band, the Latin flavoured "Romance in Durango", appeared on the album; another, "Catfish", subsequently appeared on The Bootleg Series compilation. One track left behind was a disco funk version of "Hurricane". Stannard, Linscott and Mullen left after the first album. Kokomo's second album, Rise & Shine (1976), was viewed as a disappointment by the NME and the band quickly lost impetus. Both albums had sold poorly in the UK, but charted in the United States at number 159 and number 194 for the follow-up, whose lead track "Use Your Imagination" reached number 81 in the US Billboard R&B chart in mid-1976.

== Hiatus and further releases ==
In January 1977 an indefinite hiatus was announced, with band musicians going separate ways. The last studio album, released in 1982 after an extended sabbatical, contained a minor hit single in "A Little Bit Further Away", which peaked at number 45 in the UK Singles Chart. In the Netherlands, it reached number 4.

== Second hiatus and re-emergence ==
Kokomo continued to perform with a fluid line up, until Spenner died in August 1991. In May 2008, Kokomo was reformed with Mel Collins, Tony O'Malley, Neil Hubbard, Mark Smith, Adam Phillips, Andy Hamilton, Paddy McHugh, Dyan Birch, Frank Collins, Bernie Holland and Glenn Le Fleur. In 2009, bass player Mark Smith died at his Battersea, London home.

== 2014 reunion and present ==
In August 2014, Sue Martin from Rootsaroundtheworld.com promoted a Kokomo revival tour which was received well at clubs in London. The personnel for these shows included Tony O'Malley (keyboard & vocals), Frank Collins (vocals), Dyan Birch (vocals; first show only), Paddie McHugh (vocals), Helena-May Harrison also known as Miss May (vocals), Neil Hubbard (guitar), Jim Mullen (guitar), Jennifer Maidman (bass), Nigel Hitchcock (saxophone), Frank Tontoh (drums), and Glenn LeFleur (percussion). Further shows followed in 2014.

Further shows in 2015/2016 featured seven of the original members (Tony O'Malley (keyboard & vocals), Frank Collins (vocals), Paddie McHugh (vocals), Neil Hubbard (guitar), Jim Mullen (guitar), Mel Collins (saxophone), Jody Linscott (percussion)) plus Jennifer Maidman (bass), Helena-May Harrison (vocals) and Frank Tontoh (drums). Kokomo appeared at the Royal Festival Hall, London, on 21 November 2015 with the Average White Band as part of the London Jazz Festival.

== Discography ==
- Kokomo (1975) (produced by Chris Thomas)
- Rise & Shine (1977) (produced by Brad Shapiro)
- Kokomo (1982) (produced by Leo Graham and James Mack)
- The Collection (1992)
- Live in Concert, 1975 (1998)
- To Be Cool (2004) [recorded 1974)
- Live at The Venue, 1981 (2014)

== Bibliography ==
- The Illustrated New Musical Express Encyclopedia of Rock: Edited by Nick Logan and Bob Woffinden (1977)
- CD liner notes for The Collection (1991): by Michael Heatley of Vox magazine
