= Don't Stop the Dance =

Single by Bryan Ferry

from the album Boys and Girls
- Released: 16 August 1985
- Genre: Sophisti-pop
- Length: 4:19
- Label: E.G.
- Songwriter(s): Bryan Ferry; Rhett Davies
- Producer(s): Bryan Ferry; Rhett Davies

Bryan Ferry singles chronology
"Slave to Love" (1985)	"Don't Stop the Dance" (1985)	"Windswept" (1985)

Music video
- "Don't Stop the Dance" on YouTube

"Don't Stop the Dance" is a song by the English singer Bryan Ferry from his sixth solo studio album, Boys and Girls (1985). It was released as the album's second single. The track was written and produced by Ferry and Rhett Davies. It made the top 20 of Billboard's Album Rock play list and reached number 26 on the Adult Contemporary chart.

An accompanying music video for "Don't Stop the Dance" was directed by John Scarlett Davis and featured the French model Laurence Treil and Louise King.

The track has been remixed by several DJs.

== Promotional video ==
Old film part of the music video

The music video begins with various shots of theater lights, and then cuts to Laurence Treil's hips as she dances. The film shows scenes of her silhouette, then Ferry's face as he sings. Segments of old film of people dancing play behind both as the video continues, including women on the beach, chorus girls, ballet dancers, tap dancers and others. Treil seems to play a saxophone during David Sanborn's sax solo portion of the song.

One version of the video shows nude women on the beach, but a different edition shows women in 1920s bathing costumes. Stylization for the video was completed by fashion photographer Stevie Hughes.

== Remixes ==
In 2013 all-new remixes of "Don't Stop the Dance" were released, on three limited edition 12" vinyl, and as downloads. Remixers were Eric "Dunks" Duncan, Grasshopper, Greg Wilson & Derek Kaye, Idjut Boys, Punks Jump Up, Psychemagik, Sleazy McQueen, Space Coast and Todd Terje.

== Charts ==
Chart performance for "Don't Stop the Dance"
Chart (1985)	Peak position
Australia (Kent Music Report)	68
Belgium (Ultratop 50 Flanders)	13
Europe (European Top 100 Singles)	25
Ireland (IRMA)	8
Italy (Musica e dischi)	16
Netherlands (Dutch Top 40)	32
Netherlands (Single Top 100)	29
New Zealand (Recorded Music NZ)	16
UK Singles (OCC)	21
US Adult Contemporary (Billboard)	26
US Dance Singles Sales (Billboard)	30
West Germany (GfK)	45
