= Slave to Love =

Single by Bryan Ferry

from the album Boys and Girls
- Released: 3 May 1985
- Recorded: November 1984-March 1985
- Genre: Sophisti-pop
- Length: 3:59 (7" mix); 5:56 (12" extended mix); 4:26 (album version)
- Label: E.G.
- Songwriter: Bryan Ferry
- Producers: Bryan Ferry; Rhett Davies

Bryan Ferry singles chronology
"That's How Strong My Love Is" (1978)	"Slave to Love" (1985)	"Don't Stop the Dance" (1985)

Music video
- "Slave to Love" on YouTube

"Slave to Love" is a song by the English singer and songwriter Bryan Ferry, released as the first single from his sixth solo studio album, Boys and Girls (1985). The song is one of Ferry's most popular solo hits. The single was released on 3 May 1985 and spent nine weeks in the UK singles chart in 1985, peaking at number 10. He performed the song at Live Aid in the London concert at Wembley Stadium on 13 July 1985. It also appears in the Anglo-French Polanski film Bitter Moon (1992), and American erotic romantic drama film, 9½ Weeks (1986), and features on both movie's soundtrack albums.

The song features Neil Hubbard, Pink Floyd's David Gilmour and Keith Scott on lead guitar, Dire Straits' Guy Fletcher on keyboards, Omar Hakim on drums, and Tony Levin on bass guitar.

According to Bryan Ferry, it was not Tony Levin on bass guitar. In an article in The Guardian, he says, "Neil Jason had a swing to his bass-playing that suited the track down to the ground."

== Music video ==
A music video directed by French fashion photographer and video director Jean-Baptiste Mondino and featuring the Swedish model Christine Bergström, the French model Laurence Treil, the Dutch model Marpessa Hennink, Jillian King, Fabrice Langlade, Olivier Poivre and Richard Teophile was shot to promote the single. The cinematographer was Pascal Lebegue.

== Critical reception ==
Writing for AllMusic, Bill Janovitz called "Slave to Love" an "achingly beautiful ballad" which "clearly has a 1980s aura to it, yet 'Slave to Love' was not a slave to the gimmicks of the era, sounding more timeless and classic than other radio hits from the mid-'80s." Writing for The Guardian, Jeremy Allen likened it to Roxy Music's 1979 single "Dance Away", saying that Ferry had "hit on a formula to write the same oleaginous ballad over and over again to handsome remuneration (play 'Dance Away' and 'Slave to Love' back to back and you'll see what I mean)."

== Track listing ==
- 7"
1. "Slave to Love"
2. "Valentine" (instrumental)
- 12" UK single: E.G. Records / FERRx 1 881873-1
1. "Slave to Love" (special 12" re-mix) – 5:56
2. "Slave to Love" (instrumental) – 4:23
3. "Valentine" (instrumental) – 4:00

== Charts ==
Chart (1985)	Peak position
Australia (Kent Music Report)	29
Belgium (Ultratop 50 Flanders)	11
Canada Top Singles (RPM)	75
France (SNEP)	45
Germany (GfK)	30
Ireland (IRMA)	8
Italy (Musica e dischi)	9
Netherlands (Dutch Top 40)	36
Netherlands (Single Top 100)	33
Norway (VG-lista)	5
New Zealand (Recorded Music NZ)	11
Switzerland (Schweizer Hitparade)	18
UK Singles (Official Charts)	10
US Bubbling Under Hot 100 (Billboard)	109
US Mainstream Rock Airplay (Billboard)	19

== Certifications ==
Region	Certification	Certified units/sales
New Zealand (RMNZ)	Platinum	30,000^{‡}
Spain (Promusicae)	Gold	30,000^{‡}
United Kingdom (BPI)	Silver	200,000^{‡}
^{‡} Sales+streaming figures based on certification alone.
