= Taxi (Bryan Ferry album) =

1993 studio album by Bryan Ferry

Studio album by Bryan Ferry
- Released: 10 March 1993
- Studio: Matrix (London)
- Genres: Rock; pop; soul
- Length: 39:09
- Label: Virgin
- Producers: Bryan Ferry; Robin Trower

Bryan Ferry chronology
The Ultimate Collection (1988)	Taxi (1993)	Mamouna (1994)

Professional ratings
Review scores
Source	Rating
AllMusic	3/5 stars
Calgary Herald	B+
Robert Christgau	(neither)
Entertainment Weekly	B
Music Week	2/5 stars
NME	5/10
Rolling Stone	4/5 stars

Taxi is the eighth solo studio album by the English singer Bryan Ferry, released in March 1993 by Virgin Records, over five years after the late 1987 release of his previous album Bête Noire. It was first released in Japan on 10 March, before being released in the UK on 22 March and then in the US in April. This was Ferry's third solo album since the second demise of Roxy Music in 1983, ten years earlier. The album was a commercial and critical success in the UK and parts of Europe, peaking at No. 2 in the UK. It was certified Gold by the BPI.

The first single, "I Put a Spell on You" was the album's only top 20 hit in the U.K., peaking at No. 18. The second single, "Will You Love Me Tomorrow" narrowly missed the U.K. top 20, peaking at No. 23. The third and final single, "Girl of My Best Friend" peaked at 57.

== Production and recording ==
Taxi is a cover album (the closing track "Because You're Mine" is an original). The album was recorded as a stopgap during sessions for Ferry's ninth solo studio album, Mamouna (1994), due to Ferry suffering from writer's block. When he was asked about the Taxi sessions, Ferry said, "Since I started work on the Taxi album, everything has gone great for me. The last two years have been terrific, but I had three or four miserable years. Doing the Taxi album was the start of getting things right. Just getting something done quickly and efficiently was very gratifying. Finishing something I liked and getting back into singing again, getting away from my own writing temporarily was a good thing."

== Critical reception ==
Reviewing for AllMusic, critic Ned Raggett wrote of the album: "Taxi shows a mature Bryan Ferry, suave and controlled, very much in line with his general career from 1979 on ... Ferry's treated vocals, made to sound weirdly flat and compressed, heightens the curious mood." Reviewing for Entertainment Weekly, critic David Browne wrote of the album: "Few of the remakes have the decadent, jaunty verve of his covers albums of the '70s. But that's okay, since Ferry appears to be aiming for something else: beautifully eerie mood music for the lovesick vampire in us all." Rob Sheffield wrote in his three-star review of the album that "Taxi is a consistently inspired set that ranges from 'Amazing Grace' to 'All Tomorrow's Parties.'"

== Track listing ==
No.	Title	Writer(s)	Length
1.	"I Put a Spell on You"	Screamin' Jay Hawkins	5:27
2.	"Will You Love Me Tomorrow"	Gerry Goffin; Carole King; Music Video featuring Anna Nicole Smith	4:18
3.	"Answer Me"	Gerhard Winkler; Fred Rauch; Carl Sigman	2:47
4.	"Just One Look"	Doris Payne; Gregory Carroll	3:33
5.	"Rescue Me"	Raynard Miner; Carl Smith	3:40
6.	"All Tomorrow's Parties"	Lou Reed	5:31
7.	"Girl of My Best Friend"	Ross Butler; Sam Bobrick	3:26
8.	"Amazing Grace"	John Newton	4:01
9.	"Taxi"	Homer Banks; Charles Brooks	5:30
10.	"Because You're Mine"	Bryan Ferry	1:44
Total length:			39:09

Japanese CD bonus track
No.	Title	Writer(s)	Length
11.	"Are You Lonesome Tonight" (from Honeymoon in Vegas)	Lou Handman; Roy Turk	5:08

== Personnel ==
Credits are adapted from the album's liner notes.

=== Musicians ===
- Bryan Ferry – lead vocals, backing vocals (1–9), acoustic piano (1, 2, 4–10), strings (1, 4, 6, 9, 10), synthesizers (2, 5), organ (3, 6, 7), "witch" (3, 5, 9), arrangements (8), sounds (10)
- Richard Norris – programming (1, 3–5, 9)
- Greg Phillinganes – strings (1), vibraphone (1), synthesizers (2, 4, 6–8), harp (8)
- Chris Stainton – Hammond organ (4)
- David Sancious – Hammond organ (8)
- Flaco Jiménez – accordion (8)
- Neil Hubbard – guitar (1), "probe" guitar (2), "trace" guitar (3), lead guitar (4, 7), guitar licks (6, 9), rhythm guitar (8)
- Michael Brook – "atmos" guitar (1, 8), lead guitar (5, 6), "infinite" guitar (10)
- Robin Trower – Fender guitar (1), wah wah guitar (2, 3, 7), "theme" guitar (4), "pin" guitar (5), "pocket" guitar (9), "space" guitar (10)
- David Williams – rhythm guitar (1, 3, 6–9), guitar hook (1), cat sounds (9)
- Nathan East – bass (1–9)
- Steve Pearce – bass (2)
- Steve Ferrone – drums (1–9)
- Michael Giles – drums (9)
- Andy Newmark – drums (9)
- Luís Jardim – percussion (4–6)
- Maceo Parker – alto saxophone (1)
- Mel Collins – tenor saxophone (5)
- Andy Mackay – alto saxophone (9)
- Carleen Anderson – backing vocals (1, 3–6, 8, 9), lead vocals (10)

=== Technical ===
- Bryan Ferry – production
- Robin Trower – production
- Sven Taits – engineering
- Richard Norris – pre-production engineering at Studio One (London)
- Bob Clearmountain – mixing at Bearsville Studios (New York City)
- Bob Ludwig – mastering at Masterdisk (New York City)

=== Artwork ===
- Anton Corbijn – photography
- Nick de Ville – art direction
- Bryan Ferry – art direction

== Charts ==
Chart performance for Taxi
Chart (1993)	Peak position
Australian Albums (ARIA)	26
Austrian Albums (Ö3 Austria)	24
Canada Top Albums/CDs (RPM)	35
Danish Albums (Hitlisten)	6
Dutch Albums (Album Top 100)	25
European Albums (Music & Media)	10
Finnish Albums (Suomen virallinen lista)	27
German Albums (Offizielle Top 100)	26
Greek International Albums (IFPI)	7
Italian Albums (Musica e dischi)	15
New Zealand Albums (RMNZ)	20
Norwegian Albums (VG-lista)	12
Portuguese Albums (AFP)	5
Swedish Albums (Sverigetopplistan)	27
Swiss Albums (Schweizer Hitparade)	35
UK Albums (Official Charts)	2
US Billboard 200	79

== Certifications ==
Certifications for Taxi
Region	Certification	Certified units/sales
United Kingdom (BPI)	Gold	100,000^{^}
^{^} Shipments figures based on certification alone.
