= The Right Stuff (Bryan Ferry song) =

Single by Bryan Ferry

from the album Bête Noire
- Released: 28 September 1987
- Recorded: 1987
- Genre: Sophisti-pop
- Length: 4:25
- Label: Virgin
- Songwriters: Bryan Ferry; Johnny Marr
- Producers: Bryan Ferry; Chester Kamen; Patrick Leonard

Bryan Ferry singles chronology
"Help Me" (1986)	"The Right Stuff" (1987)	"Kiss and Tell" (1988)

Music video
- "The Right Stuff" on YouTube

"The Right Stuff" is a song by Bryan Ferry, the former lead vocalist for Roxy Music. It was released as the first single from his seventh solo studio album Bête Noire (1987), being Ferry's twenty-fifth single. It was the album's only Top 40 hit in the U.K., peaking at No. 37.

== Background ==
The song was co-written by Johnny Marr and adapted from "Money Changes Everything", the Smiths' instrumental B-side to "Bigmouth Strikes Again". When Marr was asked about the collaboration in a 1989 interview with Sonics he said "He [Ferry] didn’t know who I was. But he was looking for co-writers and someone suggested me to him. Someone played him some Smiths records and he went 'Oh, this guy plays guitar all right!' So he invited me down to the studio. Bryan Ferry was an old hero of mine and it was great to work with him, but the end result was…he’s a bit blow-waved." Guy Pratt, who played bass with Ferry during this period tells it differently in his book. Ferry heard "Money Changes Everything" and had the idea of putting vocals on it. Their then guitar player Chester Kamen, "could play the intro, but couldn't play it" and so Ferry enlisted Marr himself to play on the track.

== Charts ==
Chart (1987)	Peak position
Italy Airplay (Music & Media)	11
