= Boys and Girls (album) =

Studio album by Bryan Ferry
- Released: 3 June 1985
- Recorded: 1983–1985
- Studios: AIR, London; Compass Point, New Providence, The Bahamas; Effanel Mobile; RPM, New York City; Sarm West, London; The White House, London; Power Station, New York City
- Genre: Sophisti-pop
- Length: 38:24
- Label: E.G.
- Producers: Bryan Ferry; Rhett Davies

Bryan Ferry chronology
The Bride Stripped Bare (1978)	Boys and Girls (1985)	Bête Noire (1987)

Singles from Boys and Girls
- 1. "Slave to Love" Released: May 1985; 2. "Don't Stop the Dance" Released: August 1985; 3. "Windswept" Released: November 1985

Boys and Girls is the sixth solo studio album by the English singer and songwriter Bryan Ferry, released on 3 June 1985 by E.G. Records. The album was Ferry's first solo album in seven years and the first since he had disbanded his band Roxy Music in 1983. The album was Ferry's first and only number one solo album in the UK. It was certified Platinum by the British Phonographic Industry (BPI) and contains two UK top 40 hit singles. It is also Ferry's most successful solo album in the US, having been certified Gold for sales in excess of half a million copies there.

The album contained the track "Slave to Love", which became one of Ferry's most popular solo hits. The single was released on 3 May 1985 and spent nine weeks on the UK singles chart in 1985, peaking at number 10, along with the other (modestly successful) singles "Don't Stop the Dance" and "Windswept".

The guitar solo at the end of "Slave to Love" featured Neil Hubbard and the album featured other famous guitarists such as Mark Knopfler of Dire Straits, David Gilmour of Pink Floyd, Nile Rodgers of Chic and Keith Scott from Bryan Adams' band.

The album was remastered and re-released in 2000, and was also re-released on the SACD format in 2005 and as a Blu-ray with a new Dolby Atmos mix in 2025.

== Background and production ==
Bryan Ferry began laying the groundwork for Boys and Girls in July 1983 at his Sussex home, two months after Roxy Music's split. With the help of co-producer/engineer Rhett Davies, Ferry laid down basic song sketches onto 8-track with keyboards and a drum machine pattern programmed by Davies. Gradually, they involved other musicians by the likes of Andy Newmark, Omar Hakim, Neil Hubbard, Mark Knopfler, Nile Rodgers and Keith Scott to name a few. The record took over a year to complete; they used up to seven different studios, although most of the recording was done at E.G. Records' The White House demo studio in London as per Ferry.

== Critical reception ==
Professional ratings
Review scores
Source	Rating
AllMusic	4/5 stars
Robert Christgau	B−
Pitchfork	8.5/10
Rolling Stone	(equivocal)
Smash Hits	6/10

Writing retrospectively for AllMusic, critic Ned Raggett complimented the track "Slave to Love" and wrote "As a whole, Boys and Girls fully established the clean, cool vision of Ferry on his own to the general public. Instead of ragged rock explosions, emotional extremes, and all that made his '70s work so compelling in and out of Roxy, Ferry here is the suave, debonair if secretly moody and melancholic lover, with music to match."

A retrospective review by critic Daniel Felsenthal in Pitchfork praised the album, awarding Boys and Girls a score of 8.5/10, while noting that "This is among the earliest mainstream pop records on which instrumental flourishes don’t seem played, as if on a cue, but placed, as if in a visual field. Each of the nine songs is like a room that you can wander, a gorgeous, ultra-designed space for daydreams. Cuts that were derided at the time for their aimlessness and repetition—“The Chosen One,” “Stone Woman”—now seem like showpieces that transform with each listen, their grooves bare scaffolding on which to hang surprising details."

Critic Robert Christgau wrote: "His voice thicker and more mucous, his tempos dragging despite all the fancy beats he's bought, he runs an ever steeper risk of turning into the romantic obsessive he's always played so zealously."

The 1992 edition of the Rolling Stone Album Guide gave the album three and half stars out of five: "Set in the richly synthesized mode of Avalon, Ferry's sixth album envelopes the listener in emotional subtleties and sonic nuance. Then it's over like a pleasant dream. Boys and Girls could stand a couple of more tunes along the memorable lines of "Slave to Love" or "Don't Stop the Dance." The 2004 New Rolling Stone Album Guide repeated the three-and-a-half star rating; "Boys and Girls, his first solo album after Roxy Music broke up, was his disco-friendly bid for solo stardom, and while it's too fluffy, it does have one of his greatest love songs ever, the hypnotic slow-dance "Slave to Love."

In the 1985 Pazz & Jop Critics Poll by the Village Voice it was voted the 31st best album of the year.

== 2006 surround-sound remix ==
In 2006, Virgin reissued Boys and Girls on Hybrid Super Audio CD (SACD) with a new 5.1-channel surround sound remix by the original production team of Rhett Davies (the producer) and Bob Clearmountain (the mixing engineer). The original 1985 stereo mix is left intact and is the same for the CD layer and for the HD layer, allegedly being transferred from analogue master tapes to DSD and processed in DSD throughout.

== Track listing ==
All songs written by Bryan Ferry, except where noted.

Side one
No.	Title	Writer(s)	Length
1.	"Sensation"		5:07
2.	"Slave to Love"		4:26
3.	"Don't Stop the Dance"	Ferry; Rhett Davies	4:19
4.	"A Waste Land"		1:02
5.	"Windswept"		4:31

Side two
No.	Title	Length
6.	"The Chosen One"	4:51
7.	"Valentine"	3:47
8.	"Stone Woman"	4:56
9.	"Boys and Girls"	5:25
Total length:		38:24

== Personnel ==
A promotional poster for the album

=== Musicians ===
- Bryan Ferry – vocals, keyboards, percussion
- Jon Carin – keyboards
- Guy Fletcher – keyboards (track 2)
- Chester Kamen – guitars
- Nile Rodgers – lead guitar (tracks 1, 3)
- Neil Hubbard – lead guitar (track 2)
- Keith Scott – lead guitar (track 2)
- David Gilmour – lead guitar (tracks 5, 8)
- Mark Knopfler – lead guitar (track 7)
- Tony Levin – bass guitar (track 2)
- Neil Jason – bass guitar
- Marcus Miller – bass guitar (track 3)
- Alan Spenner – bass guitar
- Andy Newmark – drums (tracks 1, 3–9)
- Omar Hakim – drums (track 2)
- Jimmy Maelen – percussion
- David Sanborn – saxophone (tracks 3, 5)
- Martin McCarrick – cello
- Anne Stephenson – strings
- Virginia Hewes – backing vocals
- Ednah Holt – backing vocals
- Fonzi Thornton – backing vocals
- Ruby Turner – backing vocals
- Alfa Anderson – backing vocals
- Michelle Cobbs – backing vocals
- Yanick Etienne – backing vocals
- Colleen Fitz-Charles – backing vocals
- Lisa Fitz-Charles – backing vocals
- Simone Fitz-Charles – backing vocals

=== Technical ===
- Bryan Ferry – production
- Rhett Davies – production, engineering
- Bob Clearmountain – engineering, mixing
- Neil Dorfsman – engineering
- Bruce Lampcov – engineering
- Femi Jiya – engineering
- Andy Lydon – engineering
- Dominick Maita – engineering
- Brian McGee – engineering
- Benjamin Armbrister – engineering assistance
- Andy "Carb" Cannell – engineering assistance
- Steve Churchyard – engineering assistance
- Randy Ezratty – engineering assistance
- Dave Greenberg – engineering assistance
- Kevin Killen – engineering assistance
- Heff Moraes – engineering assistance
- Peter Revill – engineering assistance
- Kendal Stubbs – engineering assistance
- Bob Ludwig – mastering at Masterdisk (New York City)

=== Artwork ===
- Bryan Ferry – art direction
- Simon Puxley – art direction
- Cream – artwork
- Antony Price – photography

== Charts ==
=== Weekly charts ===
Weekly chart performance for Boys and Girls
Chart (1985)	Peak position
Australian Albums (Kent Music Report)	13
Austrian Albums (Ö3 Austria)	15
Canada Top Albums/CDs (RPM)	11
Dutch Albums (Album Top 100)	4
European Albums (Eurotipsheet)	2
Finnish Albums (Suomen virallinen lista)	11
German Albums (Offizielle Top 100)	9
Italian Albums (Musica e dischi)	6
New Zealand Albums (RMNZ)	3
Norwegian Albums (VG-lista)	3
Swedish Albums (Sverigetopplistan)	4
Swiss Albums (Schweizer Hitparade)	9
UK Albums (Official Charts)	1
US Billboard 200	63

=== Year-end charts ===
Year-end chart performance for Boys and Girls
Chart (1985)	Position
Australian Albums (Kent Music Report)	58
Canada Top Albums/CDs (RPM)	63
Dutch Albums (Album Top 100)	26
German Albums (Offizielle Top 100)	41
New Zealand Albums (RMNZ)	21
Norwegian Summer Period Albums (VG-lista)	7
UK Albums (Gallup)	23

== Certifications ==
Certifications for Boys and Girls
Region	Certification	Certified units/sales
New Zealand (RMNZ)	Gold	7,500^{^}
United Kingdom (BPI)	Platinum	300,000^{^}
United States (RIAA)	Gold	500,000^{^}
^{^} Shipments figures based on certification alone.
