= Mamouna =

Studio album by Bryan Ferry
- Released: 31 August 1994
- Recorded: 1988–1994
- Studios: Utopia Studios, Master Rock Studios and Studio One (London, UK)
- Genre: Sophisti-pop
- Length: 45:04
- Label: Virgin
- Producers: Bryan Ferry; Robin Trower

Bryan Ferry chronology
Taxi (1993)	Mamouna (1994)	As Time Goes By (1999)

Singles from Mamouna
- 1. "Your Painted Smile" Released: 17 October 1994; 2. "Mamouna" Released: 30 January 1995

Mamouna is the ninth solo studio album by the English singer Bryan Ferry, first released in Japan on 31 August 1994 and then in the UK on 5 September by Virgin Records. It was Ferry's first album of original material in seven years and he spent six years writing and recording it, under the working title Horoscope. The album was supported by two singles—"Your Painted Smile" and "Mamouna"—and reached number 11 on the UK Albums Chart.

The album features contributions from former members of Ferry's band Roxy Music, including Brian Eno who left the band in 1973.

== Background ==
The completed new album was ultimately titled Mamouna, rather than Horoscope. The title track, "Mamouna", was written after the release of the single "Taxi".

Brian Eno participated in the production, applying various sound treatments to nearly every track, and co-wrote "Wildcat Days" with Ferry. Former Roxy Music members Andy Mackay (saxophone) and Phil Manzanera (guitar) also made guest appearances, with Mackay performing on two tracks, including "Wildcat Days", and Manzanera contributing guitar to one track.

The painting used for the album cover is the work of the English artist James Ward.

The album was released in September 1994. It reached a peak position of No. 11 on the charts but dropped out of the rankings after only one month. The two singles released from the album, "Your Painted Smile" and "Mamouna", peaked at No. 52 and No. 57, respectively.

== Chart performance ==
Upon release, Mamouna peaked at number 11 on the UK Albums Chart, and reached number 94 on the US Billboard 200 chart. In Europe, the album reached the top ten in four countries—Austria, Germany, Norway, and Sweden.

== Critical reception ==
Professional ratings
Review scores
Source	Rating
AllMusic	2.5/5 stars
Entertainment Weekly	B+
Music Week	3/5 stars
NME	5/10
Pitchfork	8.0/10
Rolling Stone	4/5 stars
Select	1/5 medals
Stylus Magazine	(favorable)

Reviewing Mamouna for AllMusic, critic Ned Raggett wrote, "There are some songs of note—'The 39 Steps' has a slightly menacing vibe to it, appropriate given the cinematic reference of the title, while the Ferry/Eno collaboration 'Wildcat Days' displays some of Eno's old synth-melting flash. Overall, though, Mamouna is pleasant without being involving." Robin J. Schwartz of Entertainment Weekly opined, "This isn't vintage Roxy Music, but with that wonderfully dark, seductive groove, inscrutable lyrics, and cameos from old Roxy cohorts Andy MacKay, Phil Manzanera, and even Brian Eno, it could be." Steven Volk of Rolling Stone noted that Ferry worked on the album for five years, and stated that "the resulting music—dense, richly textured art funk—reflects his meticulous craftsmanship." He added that, "despite the size of the band and the complexity of the disc's rhythms, most of the tunes are elegant and simple."

Alan Jones of Music Week offered a negative review, saying, "Returning to his own compositions here [following the release of Taxi], [Ferry] hasn't quite regained his old form and, from the 10 songs on offer, none compares favourably with his biggest hits of yesteryear." Nevertheless, he added that "the comfortable slow grooves [...] represent a logical progression," and that the "tasteful and pleasant" album will "spin off a couple of minor hits but no more."

== Track listing ==
All tracks are written by Bryan Ferry, except where noted.

Mamouna track listing
No.	Title	Writer(s)	Length
1.	"Don't Want to Know"		4:07
2.	"N.Y.C."		4:10
3.	"Your Painted Smile"		3:14
4.	"Mamouna"		5:11
5.	"The Only Face"		4:40
6.	"The 39 Steps"		5:01
7.	"Which Way to Turn"		5:44
8.	"Wildcat Days"	Ferry; Brian Eno	4:34
9.	"Gemini Moon"		3:47
10.	"Chain Reaction"		5:08

Japan-only bonus tracks
No.	Title	Writer(s)	Length
11.	"In Every Dream Home a Heartache" (live)		7:34
12.	"Bête Noire" (live)	Ferry; Patrick Leonard	4:05

== Personnel ==
- Bryan Ferry – lead vocals, acoustic piano (1–8, 10), Oberheim synthesizer (1), various synth sounds (2, 5, 6, 8), synth oboe (3, 9, 10), synth sax (4), Mellotron (4), vocoder (5), Roland Juno-106 (6), Prophet-5 (6), Roland Jupiter-8 (7), strings (9, 10)
- Brian Eno – various sonics (1, 4–7, 9, 10), sweep treatments (8)
- Richard T. Norris – programming (2, 3, 5, 9, 10), loops (8)
- Rhett Davies – programming (7)
- Guy Fletcher – synthesizers (10)
- Neil Hubbard – rhythm guitar (1), guitar licks (2, 4, 6, 7), lead guitar (3, 5, 10), guitars (9)
- Chester Kamen – guitars (1, 3, 4, 7–10), Latin guitar (5), gondola (6), guitar scratches (8)
- Phil Manzanera – guitars (1, 7)
- Jeff Thall – guitars (1–4, 6, 8, 10)
- David Williams – guitar riff (1, 4, 6–8), backing vocals (2), rhythm guitar (3, 9, 10)
- Nile Rodgers – rhythm guitar (2, 6, 9)
- Robin Trower – guitars (6)
- Nathan East – bass (1–3, 5–10)
- Pino Palladino – bass (4)
- Guy Pratt – Wah bass (5, 6, 9)
- Neil Jason – bass (9)
- Steve Ferrone – drums
- Luke Cresswell – percussion (2)
- Luís Jardim – percussion (3)
- Steve Scales – percussion (9)
- Maceo Parker – alto saxophone (2)
- Mike Paice – alto saxophone (7)
- Andy Mackay – alto saxophone (8, 9)
- Carleen Anderson – backing vocals
- Jhelisa – backing vocals (1, 9, 10)
- Fonzi Thornton – backing vocals (2, 9)
- Yanick Etienne – backing vocals (5, 6)
- Paul Johnson – backing vocals (6)
- Nan Kidwell – astrologer (9)

== Production ==
- Bryan Ferry – producer, art direction
- Robin Trower – producer
- Johnson Somerset – assistant producer
- Sven Taits – engineer
- Richard T. Norris – additional engineer
- Simon Puxley – engineer consultant
- Bob Clearmountain – mixing at MixThis! (Los Angeles, California, USA)
- Bob Ludwig – mastering at Gateway Mastering (Portland, Maine, USA)
- Nick de Ville – art direction, design
- James Ward – painting
- Steven Cassidy – photography
- Andy Gershon – management
- David Enthoven – management
- Juliet Mann – management
- I. E. Management (London) – management company
- Cohen Brothers Management (Los Angeles) – management company

== Charts ==
Chart performance for Mamouna
Chart (1994)	Peak position
Australia (ARIA)	78
Austrian Albums (Ö3 Austria)	33
Dutch Albums (Album Top 100)	59
German Albums (Offizielle Top 100)	38
New Zealand Albums (RMNZ)	45
Norwegian Albums (VG-lista)	12
Swedish Albums (Sverigetopplistan)	16
UK Albums (Official Charts)	11
US Billboard 200	94
