= Jesuit Joe =

- Cover of the French edition
- Date: 1980
- Publisher: Dargaud

Creative team
- Writers: Hugo Pratt
- Artists: Hugo Pratt
- Colorists: Patrizia Zanotti

Original publication
- Published in: Pilote magazine
- Issues: 1. M74 - #M77
- Date of publication: 1980
- Language: French
- ISBN: 2-2033-4405-9

Jesuit Joe is a mysterious character who appears in the eponymous story of Italian comics creator Hugo Pratt. This graphic novel was initially serialised in Pilote magazine before it was released as hardcover albums in 1980, in France entitled Jésuite Joe, and in Italy, entitled L'uomo del grande nord, published by Dargaud and CEPIM, respectively.

In 2017 the graphic novel was published in English under the name The Man From the Great North by IDW Publishing, in an edition where storyboards made by Pratt for the movie mentioned below have been added to the story.

== Plot ==
Jesuit Joe panel. Text in the balloon: "Too much happiness in these woods."

The laconic, anti-heroic and unpredictable main character, a Canadian native dressed in the uniform of a Sergeant in the Canadian Mounties, travels the wilderness during late 19th or early 20th century Canada, occasionally assisting those he finds in need of help. He rescues a kidnapped child and frees an imprisoned couple, but also shoots a bird for being too happy and stabs a priest in the hand.

The concerns of famed Italian cartoonist Hugo Pratt included responsibility, humanity, and social justice. Skepticism of European ideals in colonial settings is a common theme in his stories and forms the main thrust of Jesuit Joe.

== The Jesuit Joe film ==
Jesuit Joe has been adapted into a film directed by Olivier Austen and starring French actress Laurence Treil.

== Sources ==
- Pratt publications in Pilote Archived 2007-02-21 at the Wayback Machine BDoubliées (in French)
- Jesuit Joe albums Archived 2018-12-31 at the Wayback Machine Archivespratt (in French)
- Jesuit Joe French albums Bedetheque (in French)
