= Entangled (film) =

1993 French-Canadian thriller film

- Directed by: Max Fischer
- Written by: Thomas Narcejac; Pierre Boileau
- Starring: Judd Nelson; Pierce Brosnan
- Cinematography: Ennio Guarnieri
- Edited by: Marie-Sophie Dubus
- Music by: Jean-François Fabiano
- Release date: 1993
- Running time: 98 minutes
- Countries: France; Canada
- Language: English

Entangled (French: Les veufs) is a 1993 thriller film directed by Max Fischer and starring Judd Nelson and Pierce Brosnan.

== Plot ==
The mysterious Patrick Garavan watches David Merkin, who is in a coma after a car accident. When the patient awakens, he desperately calls for his lover Annabelle, who has been killed. In retrospect, he sees the course of their relationship and how the tragedy came about.

David was a writer whose first book was panned by critics. Annabelle liked it, however, and they began a tumultuous love affair. Inspired by his feelings, David wrote another book. He sent it to a young authors competition without giving his name. David didn't feel good enough for the elegant Annabelle, who was coveted as a good-looking photo model by men. He came across secret meetings in a French château and jealously suspected a rival. He snuck into the castle and inadvertently shot Mark Merylle when a shot went off from a pistol he dropped. David escaped from the crime scene. His girlfriend told him about her lucrative work for a perfume advertisement, about which she had to remain silent so far. Mark, a photographer, had taken erotic photos of her but had no affair with her. David still saw rivals everywhere and jealousy tormented him. His girlfriend was distraught over his suspicions. David's anonymous book won first prize in the competition and became a bestseller. Annabelle brought the disk that proved who the author was to Patrick, who she used to live with. He confronted her with a newspaper article in which David was wanted as Mark's murderer. Annabelle was at the end of her nerve. When she was driving with David in the car, she opened the door to leave him. This caused the car to skid and collide with an oncoming vehicle. The young woman was killed and David was admitted to the hospital seriously injured.

When he wakes up, he leaves the hospital unrecognized. The bribed nurse informs Patrick immediately. He contacts David, and they meet in his castle for a psychological test of strength. Patrick pretends to be the real writer of the hit novel. With David's help, he wants to turn it into a script for a film and offers him money for it. Both present their different points of view on the plot. It is about love, desire and jealousy. David thinks Annabelle lives on in his book. He admits to be guilty of her and Mark's death. Patrick incites David's jealousy and shows him an erotic video in which Annabelle can be seen in bed with two naked men. David commits suicide with a pistol, to which Patrick manipulated him, because in reality Annabelle was not having an affair, but the video was her work for the perfume advertisement. Through his deception, Patrick achieved his goal of avenging the death of Mark, whom he loved.

== Cast ==
- Judd Nelson as David Merkin
- Pierce Brosnan as Patrick Garavan
- Laurence Treil as Annabelle
- Roy Dupuis as Max
- Lorenzo Caccialanza as Mark Merylle
- Alex Chapman as Johnny
- Michael McGill as The Doctor
- Danielle Bissonette as Elizabeth
- Robert Lombard as The Mayor
- Dorian Joe Clark as The Nurse
- Jacques Herlin as The Florist
