= St Mark's West Essex Catholic School =

Location
- Tripton Road; Harlow, Essex, CM18 6AA; England
- Coordinates: 51.76448°N 0.10355°E

Information
- Type: Academy
- Religious affiliation: Roman Catholic
- Established: 1965
- Department for Education URN: 137058 Tables
- Ofsted: Reports
- Head teacher: John Taylor
- Gender: Coeducational
- Age: 11 to 18
- Houses: Bede, Elgar, Fisher, Hume, More, Newman
- Website: http://www.st-marks.essex.sch.uk/

St Mark's West Essex Catholic School is a Roman Catholic secondary school and sixth form with academy status located in Harlow, Essex, England.

The school has six forms in each secondary year, each containing 20-30 students, with each form named after one of six historical Catholic figures (Bede, Elgar, Fisher, Hume, More, Newman, Thomas). St Mark's teaches years 7–13, and was the only sixth form in Harlow until the opening of Sir Frederick Gibberd College in September 2021.

St Mark's celebrated its 50th anniversary in 2015.

== Headteachers ==
- Anthony O'Shea (1965–1982)
- Brian Quinn (1982–1994)
- David Brunwin (1994–2011)
- Elaine Heaphy (2011–2023)
- John Taylor (2023–Present)

== Notable alumni ==
- Barry Kamen (1963-2015)

== See also ==
- List of schools in Essex
