= Arrival (band) =

English rock band

- Origin: Liverpool, England
- Genres: Pop rock
- Years active: Late 1960s-1972
- Label: Decca
- Past members: Dyan Birch; Carroll Carter; Frank Collins; Lloyd Courtenay; Don Hume; Paddy McHugh; Tony O'Malley; Glen LeFleur; Raphael Pereira; Lee Sutherland

Arrival were an English, London-based close-harmony pop-rock band, featuring singers originally from Liverpool. Following their appearance on London Weekend Television's The Simon Dee Show in 1970 and two chart hits, "Friends" and "I Will Survive", the band was booked to appear at the Isle of Wight Festival 1970.

After Arrival disbanded, its members joined other projects such as Kokomo, Olympic Runners, and Gonzalez, and became session musicians or session singers.

== Personnel ==
- Dyan Birch – vocals (born Dyan Joan Birch, 25 January 1949 Liverpool – 10 October 2020)
- Carroll Carter – vocals (born 10 June 1946, Liverpool)
- Frank Collins – vocals (born 25 October 1947, Liverpool)
- Lloyd Courtenay – drums (born 20 December 1947, Wallasey)
- Don Hume – bass (born Donald Hume, 31 March 1950, Watford, Hertfordshire)
- Paddy McHugh – vocals (born Patrick McHugh, 28 August 1946, Allerton, Liverpool)
- Tony O'Malley – vocals, keyboards (born Anthony O'Malley, 15 July 1948, Bushey, Hertfordshire)
- Glen LeFleur – drums, percussion (born 1947, Rangoon, Burma, now known as Yangon, Myanmar
- Raphael Pereira – guitar
- Lee Sutherland – bass

== Discography ==
=== Albums ===
- Arrival (1970), Decca SKL 5055
- Arrival (1972), CBS 64733

=== Compilation albums ===
- The Complete Recordings of Arrival (February 2012), RPM D904 (double CD)

=== Singles ===
- "Friends" (January 1970) – UK No. 8
- "I Will Survive" (June 1970) – UK No. 16
- "Jun (So in Love)" (Japan only release) (August 1970), King Records
- "(Let My Life Be Your) Love Song" (February 1971) (written by Jimmy Webb)
- "He's Misstra Know It All" (October 1973), CBS (written by Stevie Wonder)
