= The Bride Stripped Bare (album) =

Studio album by Bryan Ferry
- Released: 1 September 1978
- Recorded: 1977
- Studios: Mountain Studios (Montreux, Switzerland); Atlantic Studios (New York City, New York)
- Genres: Rock; pop
- Length: 41:42
- Label: EG
- Producers: Waddy Watchel; Rick Marotta; Simon Puxley; Steve Nye; Bryan Ferry

Bryan Ferry chronology
In Your Mind (1977)	The Bride Stripped Bare (1978)	Boys and Girls (1985)

The Bride Stripped Bare is the fifth solo studio album by the English rock singer Bryan Ferry. It was released in 1978, shortly before Ferry reconvened his band Roxy Music which had been on hiatus for three years. It was recorded after his girlfriend Jerry Hall left him for Mick Jagger in 1977, and appears to contain references to their break-up. The album peaked at number 13 on the albums chart in the United Kingdom. It spawned three singles: Ferry's "Sign of the Times", a cover of Velvet Underground's "What Goes On", and an arrangement of the Irish folk song "Carrickfergus".

The album's title is taken from the Marcel Duchamp artwork The Bride Stripped Bare by Her Bachelors, Even. Ferry had been introduced to the work as an art school student by Richard Hamilton. A subtext of Duchamp's piece is masculine and feminine relationships.

== Critical reception ==
Professional ratings
Review scores
Source	Rating
AllMusic	2.5/5 stars
Christgau's Record Guide	B+

Reviewing for AllMusic, critic Ned Raggett wrote: "When Jerry Hall, front-cover model on Roxy's Siren, left Ferry for Mick Jagger, his response was this interesting album, not a full success but by no means a washout." Critic Robert Christgau wrote of the album, "Maybe the smoke in Bryan's eyes has finally reached his heart; the apparent sincerity of some of the singing here makes those five-minute moments when he lingers ponderously over a key lyric easier to take." and he added that "The Los Angeles musicians don't hurt either – the conjunction of his style of stylization (feigned detachment) makes for interesting expressive tension."

Greil Marcus listed it as his number one record in The Pazz and Jop Critics Poll of 1978. Marcus commented about the album, and is quoted saying, "Already a certified commercial stiff after only a couple of months in the racks, this stunningly personal album—comparable in its way to Van Morrison's Astral Weeks, Jesse Winchester, John Cale’s Vintage Violence or Bob Dylan's Blood on the Tracks—continues to deepen the Don-Juan-in-Hell persona this English eccentric has explored throughout the decade. Backed by American session men (notably guitarist Waddy Wachtel), Ferry acts out The Revenge of Lust, a tale that leaves all parties free to indulge their cruelest, most self-pitying instincts, and then pay for them. From “Can’t Let Go,” an extraordinarily dramatic account of a lover in exile, to “Hold On I’m Coming,” the latest in Ferry's string of unlikely and successful covers, the record is glamorous, bitter, effete and passionate. As always, Ferry sings in the voice of Dracula risen from the grave—risen to tell us how much he cares."

Dave Marsh gave the record three stars (out of five) and wrote "The Bride Stripped Bare balances Ferry's approaches much more effectively, allowing him to cover such romantic soul standards as "That's How Strong My Love Is" alongside his despondently modern "When She Walks in the Room." The result might have been a triumph if it weren't for the misconceived production, largely the product of this quintessentially British singer working with such Los Angeles session musicians as Rick Marotta and Waddy Wachtel, who also coproduced. (Ferry's lack of commercial success in America was probably the reason for the inappropriate matchup.) Still, Bride suggests that Ferry's solo work still has much-underdeveloped potential; it's unfortunate that he has devoted all his time since then to the re-formed version of Roxy Music."

Mark Coleman in his three and half star review stated "The Bride Stripped Bare is more adventurous; many listeners thought it was foolhardy. Bryan Ferry recording in L.A. with session veterans? Well, guitarist Waddy Wachtel pulls out some surprisingly ripe riffs, while Ferry croons both Al Green's "Take Me to the River" and the Velvet Underground's "What Goes On" without showing signs of strains. Recent Roxy Music converts might begin their Ferry appreciation course with this undervalued and very accessible item."

Rob Sheffield in another three and half star review wrote "The Bride Stripped Bare was a real puzzle, slicking over some potentially great songs with a hack L.A. studio band (Waddy Wachtel on a Bryan Ferry record?). There's the glorious seven-minute "When She Walks in the Room" and a great version of the Irish folk song "Carrickfergus," but Ferry's "Take Me to the River" has about one-eighth of the Big Muddy juice of Al Green's original, and it had the misfortune to come out the same year as Talking Heads' version."

== Track listing ==
Side one
No.	Title	Writer(s)	Length
1.	"Sign of the Times"	Bryan Ferry	2:28
2.	"Can't Let Go"	Ferry	5:14
3.	"Hold On (I'm Coming)"	Isaac Hayes; David Porter	3:37
4.	"The Same Old Blues"	J. J. Cale	3:21
5.	"When She Walks in the Room"	Ferry	6:28

Side two
No.	Title	Writer(s)	Length
6.	"Take Me to the River"	Al Green; Mabon "Teenie" Hodges	4:29
7.	"What Goes On"	Lou Reed	4:11
8.	"Carrickfergus"	Traditional, arranged by Ferry	3:46
9.	"That's How Strong My Love Is"	Roosevelt Jamison	3:17
10.	"This Island Earth"	Ferry	5:06
Total length:			41:42

== Personnel ==
Musicians

- Bryan Ferry – vocals, backing vocals (5, 7), acoustic piano (5), arrangements (8), keyboards (10)
- Ann Odell – electric piano (1), acoustic piano (2, 3), string arrangements (2, 5, 10), organ (7)
- Steve Nye – electric piano (4, 9)
- Neil Hubbard – guitar (1–7, 9, 10)
- Waddy Wachtel – guitar (1, 2, 4, 6, 7, 8, 10), slide guitar (3), backing vocals (3, 5, 7)
- Alan Spenner – bass (1–4, 6, 7, 9)
- Herbie Flowers – string bass (5, 8)
- John Wetton – bass guitar (10)
- Rick Marotta – drums (1–7, 9)
- Preston Heyman – drums (10)
- Mel Collins – saxophone (3, 9)
- Martin Drover – trumpet (3, 9)

Production and artwork

- Bryan Ferry – producer
- Rick Marotta – producer
- Steve Nye – producer, engineer
- Simon Puxley – producer
- Waddy Wachtel – producer
- Jimmy Douglass – engineer
- Lew Hahn – engineer
- Dave Richards – assistant engineer
- Randy Mason – assistant engineer
- Martin Pearson – assistant engineer
- Cream – artwork
- Antony Price – design
- John Swannell – photography
- Brian Harris – typography
- Ahmet Ertegun – "counsel"
- Barbara Allen – cover star
- Anthony Clavet – make-up
- Yvonne Gold – make-up

== Charts ==
Chart (1978)	Peak position
Australian (Kent Music Report)	32
