= Chester Kamen =

British guitarist

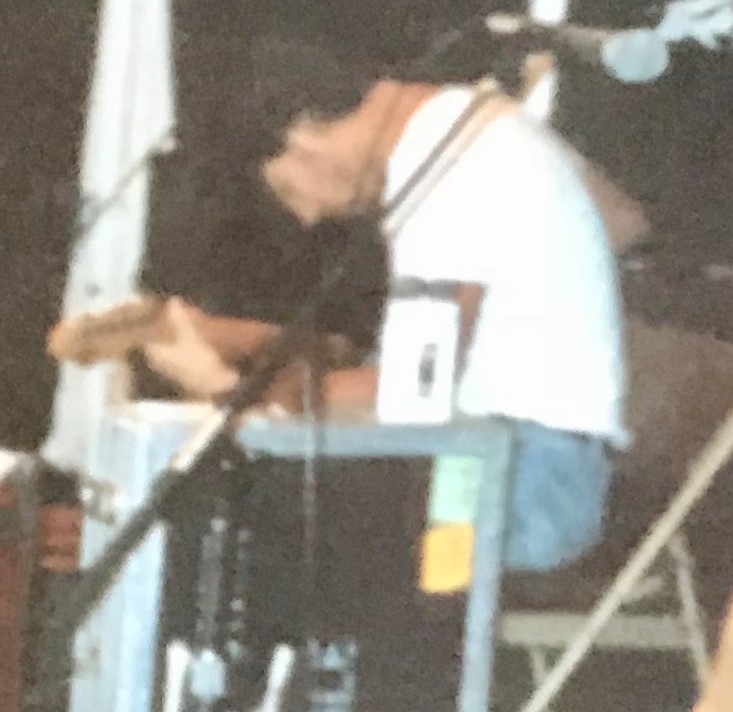
- Kamen performing in New York, 1986

Background information
- Born: Hackney, London
- Genres: Pop; pop rock; art rock; progressive rock
- Occupations: Musician; singer; record producer; songwriter
- Instruments: Guitar; vocals; bass guitar; harmonica
- Years active: 1985–present
- Label: Island

Chester Kamen is a British session guitarist, whose work has included performing with Paul McCartney, Bryan Ferry, Bob Geldof, Natalie Imbruglia, Madonna, Duran Duran, Robbie Williams, Roger Waters, David Gilmour, Seal, Massive Attack, Kirsty MacColl, Belouis Some and Gabrielle.

== Early life ==
Kamen started playing the guitar at the age of 11, and at 18, he turned professional. His first recording was with the band called Numbers. Kamen and the Numbers vocalist, Ouida, teamed up and were discovered by Bryan Ferry who produced their self-penned single entitled, "Pick Up In a Nightclub". He is the elder brother of Nick Kamen and Barry Kamen. Chester has three children; Joni, Finley, and Ben. Although they both frequently worked with Pink Floyd musicians, he is not related to Michael Kamen.

== Career ==
In 1985, Kamen performed on stage at Live Aid alongside Pink Floyd's guitarist David Gilmour as part of Bryan Ferry's backing band, first playing with Ferry on his Boys and Girls album also in 1985. He continued to work with Ferry into the 1990s. Kamen joined him for the 1989 dates of his Bête Noire tour and was the lead guitarist on the 1994 dates of his Mamouna tour. Kamen also co-wrote and co-produced some of the tracks on Ferry's Bête Noire album including the song "Seven Deadly Sins" along with Guy Pratt.

Around 1990, Chester formed a band called Wildlife with Geoff Dugmore and Steve Barnacle which toured with Jeff Healey. They produced an album eponymously named Wildlife with Epic ref Epic 467361 2. These are not to be confused with other bands of the same name. They appear to have been short lived and didn't produce any other material apart from a Single/EP

In 2002, when Roger Waters continued his In The Flesh Tour, Kamen was brought on board to replace Doyle Bramhall II, who had other commitments and could not commit to the tour. Kamen's association with Waters continued, when he replaced Andy Fairweather-Low on guitars and backing vocals, for the 2008 leg on Waters' The Dark Side of the Moon Live tour. Kamen also notably appeared with Waters and David Gilmour when they performed a short set together for the charity Hoping Foundation, in Oxfordshire, England on 11 July 2010. In 2016, Kamen toured as part of David Gilmour's band, taking part in his Rattle That Lock Tour.

In May 2021, Kamen released the track "Stories" performed by his band The Twins: "Dedicated to the memory of my two beloved little brothers, Nick and Barry".

== Selected discography ==
Year	Title	Artist
1985	Boys and Girls	Bryan Ferry
1985	Some People	Belouis Some
1987	Bête Noire	Bryan Ferry
1988	Big Thing	Duran Duran
1989	Like a Prayer	Madonna
1990	Wild and Lonely	The Associates
1990	Wildlife	Wildlife
1991	Seal	Seal
1993	Symphony or Damn	Terence Trent D'Arby
1994	Mamouna	Bryan Ferry
1994	Protection	Massive Attack
