= Ray Petri =

British fashion designer (1948–1989)

- Born: Ray Petrie; 16 September 1948; Dundee, Scotland
- Died: August 1989 (aged 40); London, England
- Occupation: Fashion designer
- Label: Buffalo

Ray Petri (16 September 1948 – 15 August 1989) was a fashion stylist and creator of the fashion house Buffalo.

Born Ray Petrie in Dundee, Scotland, Petri moved to Brisbane, Australia with his family at the age of 15. In 1969, feeling that Australia was too provincial, he moved to London, England, where he ran a jewellery booth at the Camden Street antiques market. He loved reggae and styled Freddie McGregor. Between 1983 and 1989, Petri worked as a freelance with style magazines The Face, i-D and Arena. He collaborated with stylist Mitzi Lorenz and photographers Jamie Morgan, Martin Brading, Roger Charity, Marc Lebon and Norman Watson to evolve the Buffalo Boy series of fashion spreads. During his career, Petri also worked with designers Jean Paul Gaultier and Giorgio Armani.

Petri's death, in August 1989 at the age of 40, was AIDS-related.
