= Dyan Birch =

English singer (1949–2020)

Dyan Joan Birch (25 January 1949 – 10 October 2020) was an English singer.

Born in Liverpool, Birch worked as a teenager in Brian Epstein's NEMS record shop in the city. In 1969, she and her friends formed the band Arrival, and moved to London. The group had two UK chart hits in 1970, "Friends" and "I Will Survive", both featuring Birch, and played at the Isle of Wight Festival that year. The group later expanded and changed style, becoming Kokomo, who were successful in London pubs and clubs in the mid-1970s. Several members of the band became respected session musicians, and Birch became a backing singer on records by Bryan Ferry, Gloria Gaynor, Frankie Miller, Marianne Faithfull, Manfred Mann's Earth Band and Alvin Lee.

She was the younger sister of the late Pamela Birch of the Liverbirds.

Birch died on 10 October 2020 from chronic obstructive pulmonary disease (COPD), at the age of 71.
