= Alan Spenner =

English bassist (1948–1991)

- Born: Alan Henry Spenner; 7 May 1948; Dalston, London, England
- Died: 11 August 1991 (aged 43)
- Genres: Hard rock; blues rock; folk rock; jazz; British soul
- Occupations: Musician; songwriter
- Instruments: Bass guitar; vocals
- Years active: 1968–1991
- Formerly of: The Grease Band; Spooky Tooth; Kokomo

Alan Henry Spenner (7 May 1948 – 11 August 1991) was an English bassist who performed with Wynder K. Frog, the Grease Band, Spooky Tooth, ABC, David Coverdale, David Soul, Joe Cocker, Kenny Loggins, Lynda Carter, Peter Frampton, Ted Nugent, Mick Taylor, China Crisis, Murray Head, Kokomo, Roxy Music, and played on the original 1970 concept album Jesus Christ Superstar.

Spenner played bass guitar live at Woodstock in 1969 with Joe Cocker and the Grease Band and can be seen on The Woodstock Directors Cut DVD. In 1975, he played on Bryn Haworth's second studio album Sunny Side of the Street. In August 1982, he played on Roxy Music's VHS/DVD The High Road, filmed live in Fréjus, France.

Spenner died on 11 August 1991 of a heart attack at the age of 43. He was married to Dyan Birch, former lead vocalist with Arrival and then Kokomo. His son Henry is the former drummer for the band Fields.

== Equipment ==
Spenner typically played Fender Precision, Fender Precision Fretless and Wal electric basses through an Ampeg amplification system. His Wal bass was a 78 JG Series that, coupled with his playing style, provided a signature sound heard on many Roxy Music songs, such as "Same Old Scene" and "Avalon".
