= Andy Hamilton (pop saxophonist) =

British saxophonist (born 1953)

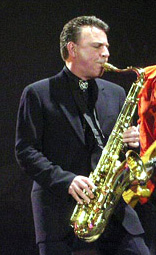
- Hamilton performing at Wembley Arena in London, 2003

Background information
- Born: Andrew Kevin Hamilton; March 28, 1953 (age 72); Portsmouth, England
- Genres: Pop
- Occupation: Musician
- Instruments: Saxophone; keyboards; EWI
- Years active: 1968–present
- Website: andyhamilton.net

Andrew Kevin Hamilton (born 28 March 1953) is a British tenor saxophonist who has played with Duran Duran, Wham!, Elton John, Pet Shop Boys, Tina Turner, George Michael, Paul McCartney, Radiohead, Bon Jovi, David Bowie, Ben E. King, Dexy's Midnight Runners, Brian May, Stereophonics and more.

== Career ==
After picking up the saxophone when he was 15, Hamilton spent the early 1970s playing for Smiling Hard at the Top Ten Club on the Reeperbahn. They went on to tour Europe and Australia and were often hired by US artists, notably playing for Edwin Starr and Ben E. King. In 1979, Hamilton recorded "H.A.P.P.Y. Radio" and toured America with Starr.

Upon moving back to London, Hamilton met Tony Visconti, later playing on several Visconti productions. Through this, Hamilton met Colin Thurston and went on to record the 'night' version of "Planet Earth". Hamilton toured alongside Duran Duran during the 1980s and played a saxophone solo on "Rio". He did three world tours alongside the Durans—Sing Blue Silver during 1983–84 and the Strange Behaviour Tour in 1987, in support of the Notorious album, where he met and performed alongside Lou Reed. He later toured worldwide with the reunited Durans during their 2003 reunion tour.

In 1982, Hamilton joined Dexy's Midnight Runners, whom he toured extensively with in the US and Europe during their rise to fame after their single "Come On Eileen". After being pulled off stage one night in France, Hamilton met David Bowie, who let him feature in some music videos, notably "Wild Is the Wind" and "The Drowned Girl".

Hamilton joined the Boomtown Rats and recorded an album V Deep before extensively touring with them, and performing at Live Aid.

In 1984, Hamilton performed as a musician in Give My Regards to Broad Street, a film written by Paul McCartney.

During the mid-1980s, Hamilton met George Michael, and recorded many Wham! records such as "I'm Your Man" and "The Edge of Heaven". He also featured in many of their music videos, and later supported Michael during his solo career, recording (and touring) multiple studio albums, such as Faith, Listen Without Prejudice Vol. 1 and Older. Hamilton was part of the 25 Live tour, where Michael held the first concert at the newly built Wembley Stadium.

During Hamilton's career, he recorded and toured with many other artists. He recorded with Tina Turner on the 1991 re-recording of "Nutbush City Limits", as well as others. Hamilton recorded on the Bilingual album with the Pet Shop Boys. He played on multiple Judie Tzuke albums, and toured to promote one of them. He toured extensively with Eros Ramazzotti and was the musical director of ABC for a couple of years. Hamilton also recorded on the Radiohead album Kid A and toured with the band in Paris and New York. He also recorded with Kim Wilde, Bon Jovi, Brian May, Gary Barlow, Marc Almond, Nina Hagen, Altered Images and many more.

He has toured alongside Dire Straits Legacy.

Hamilton has composed theme and incidental music for television and film in both the US and the UK. He has a songwriting partnership with guitarist Phil Palmer, and they won the UK Songwriting Contest in 2015 with the song "Everything's Great All The Time". As well as saxophones, Hamilton also plays keyboards and EWI (electronic wind instrument).
