= List of Camel band members =

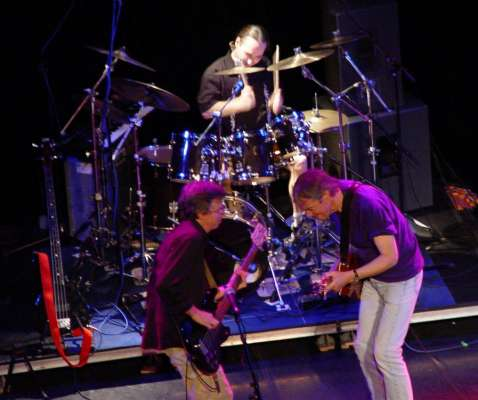
(left to right) Colin Bass, Denis Clement and Andrew Latimer (Ton Scherpenzeel not shown)

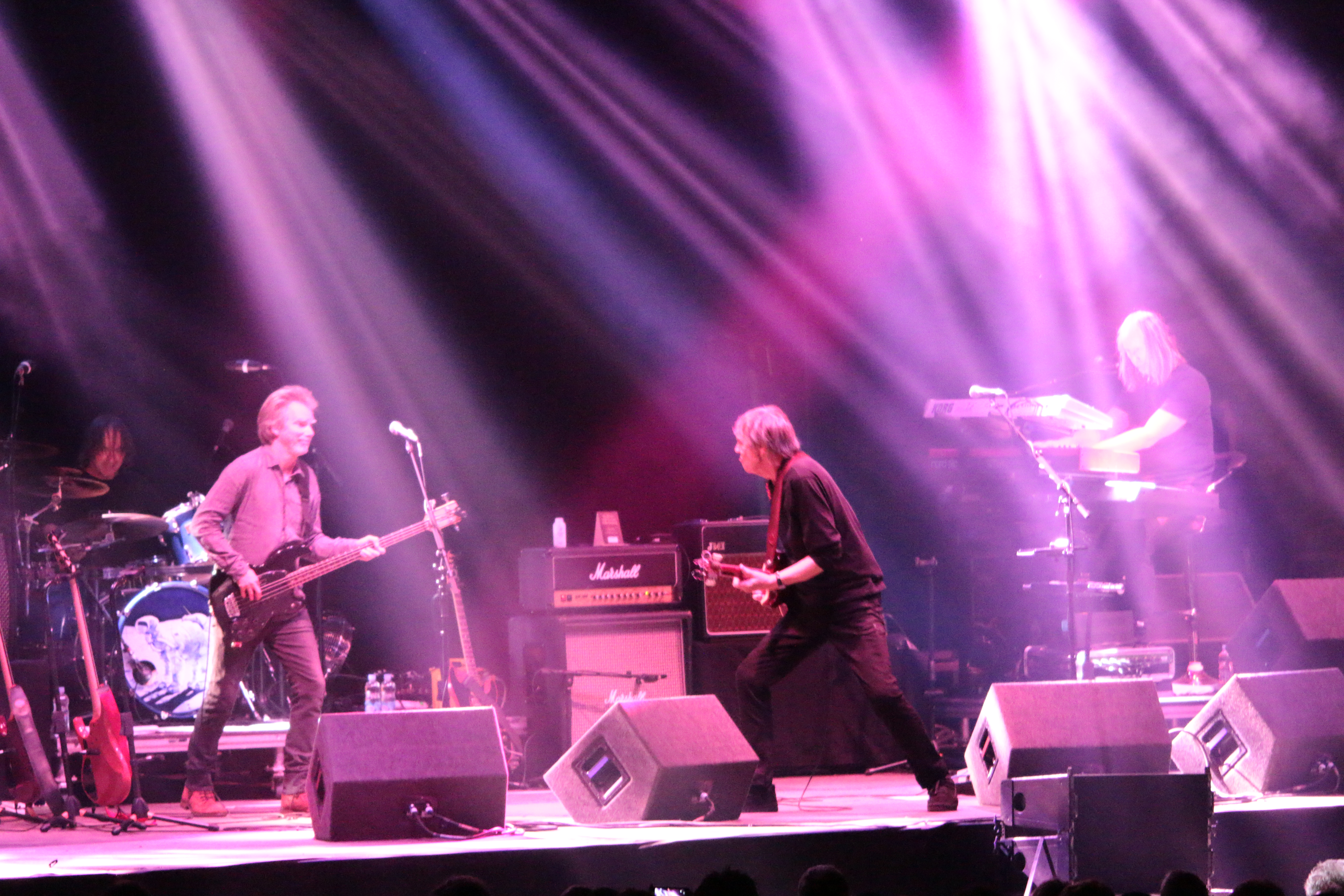
(left to right) Denis Clement, Colin Bass, Andrew Latimer and Ton Scherpenzeel (Jason Hart not shown)

Two line-ups of Camel performing in 2003 2015

Camel are an English progressive rock band from Guildford, Surrey. Formed in October 1971, the group originally featured guitarist, flautist and vocalist Andrew Latimer, bassist and vocalist Doug Ferguson, keyboardist and vocalist Peter Bardens, and drummer Andy Ward. The band's current lineup includes Latimer, bassist, keyboardist and vocalist Colin Bass (from 1979 to 1981, and since 1984), drummer Denis Clement (since 2000), and keyboardist and saxophonist Peter Jones (since 2016).

== History ==
=== 1971–1984 ===
Camel were formed in October 1971 by Andrew Latimer, Doug Ferguson, Peter Bardens and Andy Ward. During the tour in promotion of the band's fourth studio album Moonmadness, the group's lineup became a quintet with the addition of former King Crimson saxophonist and flautist Mel Collins. In early 1977, Ferguson was replaced by former Caravan bassist Richard Sinclair. Bardens followed the next July, with his place taken by two former bandmates of Sinclair in Caravan – Jan Schelhaas and Dave Sinclair, Richard's cousin. Both Sinclairs left after the Breathless tour.

In early 1979, Camel returned with bassist Colin Bass and former Happy the Man keyboardist/flautist Kit Watkins in place of the Sinclair cousins. Mel Collins also stepped back from the band as a full-time member, although continued to collaborate with them on occasion. Neither of the band's keyboardists contributed to 1981's Nude, which featured Duncan Mackay, although they returned for the subsequent tour. After the tour ended in mid-1981, Ward attempted to commit suicide after increasing drug and alcohol abuse, which led to the group all but disbanding that summer.

As the only remaining member of Camel by early 1982, Andrew Latimer recorded The Single Factor with Alan Parsons Project members Chris Rainbow (keyboards, vocals) and David Paton (bass, vocals), while drums were covered by various guest contributors. Kit Watkins rejoined the trio for the subsequent touring cycle, which also featured second guitarist Andy Dalby and drummer Stuart Tosh. In January 1983, Ward – still a contracted member of the band – officially left Camel. He was replaced by Paul Burgess, while Watkins was replaced by Kayak's Ton Scherpenzeel.

=== 1984–1999 ===
After the release of Stationary Traveller, Colin Bass returned to Camel and Richie Close joined on keyboards for the resulting tour, which spawned the live release Pressure Points: Live in Concert. Following the conclusion of the touring cycle, Camel remained dormant for much of the rest of the decade – Latimer and his former bandmates were involved in legal disputes with their former management company, in 1985 the group parted ways with Decca Records, and in 1988 the group's frontman decided to move to the United States, start his own label and build his own studio.

In September 1991, Camel released their first studio album in seven years, Dust and Dreams, which featured a lineup of Andrew Latimer, Colin Bass, Ton Scherpenzeel and Paul Burgess, in addition to several guests. The band started touring again the following year, with Scherpenzeel replaced by Mickey Simmonds. On 5 March 1993, Latimer's father Stan died, leading the band to take another hiatus and delay the release of the live album Never Let Go. As of spring 1994, Latimer had begun writing a new album, and the group's lineup still included Bass, Simmonds and Burgess.

Recording for the album, Harbour of Tears, commenced in March 1995 with Latimer, Bass and Simmonds joined by session contributor John Xepoleas. After the album's release in January, the group were due to embark on another tour, however shortly before its commencement Simmonds announced that he was leaving the band to spend more time with his family, forcing the remaining members to postpone the tour. Simmonds and Burgess were eventually replaced by Fish members Foss Patterson and Dave Stewart, respectively, and the tour took place during 1997.

=== Since 1999 ===
Andrew Latimer, Colin Bass and Dave Stewart released Rajaz in 1999, which featured keyboards performed remotely and sent to the band by Ton Scherpenzeel. For the tour in promotion of the release the following year, Guy LeBlanc took over the vacant keyboardist position in March 2000. However, just two weeks after his arrival, Stewart announced that he would be leaving the group; his position was briefly taken by former Jethro Tull drummer Clive Bunker, before LeBlanc brought in former bandmate Denis Clement just ten days before the start of the tour in August.

In 2003, the band embarked on a 'farewell' tour. Due to a family emergency, LeBlanc was unavailable for the tour's duration; he was replaced by Tom Brislin for the North American leg in June, and later by Scherpenzeel for the European leg in October. Ten years later, after Latimer recovered from several years of illness, Camel returned on the Retirement Sucks Tour with special guest keyboardist Jan Schelhaas. In October, Schelhaas was replaced by Renaissance keyboardist Jason Hart, as the group planned to continue touring in 2014 which would present scheduling conflicts.

LeBlanc was forced to sit out Camel tours starting in February 2014 due to ill health, with Scherpenzeel returning again in his place. LeBlanc eventually died of kidney cancer on 27 April 2015. In February 2016, Peter Jones took over on keyboards.

== Members ==
=== Current ===
Image	Name	Years active	Instruments	Release contributions
	Andrew Latimer	1971–present	guitar; flute; recorder; keyboards; synthesisers; bass; vocals	all Camel releases
	Colin Bass	1979–1981; 1984–present	bass; keyboards; acoustic guitar; vocals	I Can See Your House from Here (1979); Nude (1981); Dust and Dreams (1991); Never Let Go (1993); all Camel releases from Harbour of Tears (1996) onwards, except Gods of Light '73–'75 (2000) and Moondances (2007)
	Denis Clement	2000–present	drums; percussion; bass; keyboards; recorder	all Camel releases from The Paris Collection (2001) onwards, except Moondances (2007)
	Peter Jones	2016–present	keyboards; synthesisers; saxophones; vocals	Ichigo Ichie (Live In Japan 2016) (2017); Live at the Royal Albert Hall (2019)

=== Former ===
Image	Name	Years active	Instruments	Release contributions
	Andy Ward	1971–1983 (inactive 1981–83)	drums; percussion	all Camel releases from Camel (1973) to Nude (1981); On the Road 1972 (1992); On the Road 1981 (1997); Gods of Light '73–'75 (2000); Moondances (2007)
	Peter Bardens	1971–1978 (died 2002)	keyboards; synthesisers; mellotron; piano; vocals	all Camel releases from Camel (1973) to Breathless (1978); The Single Factor (1982) – guest appearance on one track only; Pressure Points: Live in Concert (1984); On the Road 1972 (1992); Gods of Light '73–'75 (2000); Moondances (2007)
	Doug Ferguson	1971–1977	bass; vocals	all Camel releases from Camel (1973) to Moonmadness (1976); A Live Record (1978); On the Road 1972 (1992); Gods of Light '73–'75 (2000); Moondances (2007)
	Mel Collins	1976–1979	saxophones; flute; oboe; clarinet; piccolo	all Camel releases from Rain Dances (1977) to Nude (1981); Stationary Traveller (1984) – guest appearance on one track only; Pressure Points: Live in Concert (1984); Moondances (2007)
	Richard Sinclair	1977–1979	bass; vocals	Rain Dances (1977); A Live Record (1978); Breathless (1978); Moondances (2007)
	Jan Schelhaas	1978–1981 (touring 2013)	keyboards; synthesisers	Breathless (1978) – one track only; I Can See Your House from Here (1979); Nude (1981) – one track only; On the Road 1981 (1997)
	Dave Sinclair	1978–1979	keyboards; synthesisers	Breathless (1978) – two tracks only
	Kit Watkins	1979–1980; 1981; 1982	keyboards; synthesisers; piano; flute; clarinet	I Can See Your House from Here (1979); On the Road 1982 (1994); On the Road 1981 (1997)
	Chris Rainbow	1982–1984 (died 2015)	vocals; keyboards	The Single Factor (1982); Stationary Traveller (1984); Pressure Points: Live in Concert (1984); On the Road 1982 (1994)
	David Paton	1982–1984	bass; vocals	all Camel releases from The Single Factor (1982) to Dust (1991) – guest appearance on one track only; On the Road 1982 (1994); Harbour of Tears (1996) – guest appearance on one track only
	Andy Dalby	1982–1983	guitar	On the Road 1982 (1994)
	Paul Burgess	1983–1994	drums; percussion	Stationary Traveller (1984); Pressure Points: Live in Concert (1984); Dust (1991); Never Let Go (1993)
	Ton Scherpenzeel	1983–1991 (session 1999, touring 2003, 2014–16)	keyboards; synthesisers; piano; accordion	Stationary Traveller (1984); Pressure Points: Live in Concert (1984); Dust (1991); Rajaz (1999)
	Richie Close	1984 (died 1991)	keyboards	Pressure Points: Live in Concert (1984)
	Mickey Simmonds	1992–1996	keyboards	Never Let Go (1993); Harbour of Tears (1996)
	Dave Stewart	1996–1999	drums; percussion	Coming of Age (1998); Rajaz (1999)
	Foss Patterson	1996–1997	keyboards; vocals	Coming of Age (1998)
	Guy LeBlanc	2000–2015 (until his death; inactive 2014–15)	keyboards; synthesisers; piano; vocals	The Paris Collection (2001); A Nod and a Wink (2002); The Snow Goose (2013); In from the Cold (2014)
	Clive Bunker	2000	drums; percussion	none – studio rehearsals only
	Jason Hart	2013–2016	keyboards; synthesisers; acoustic guitar; vocals	In from the Cold (2014)

=== Touring ===
Image	Name	Years active	Instruments	Details
	Stuart Tosh	1982	drums; backing vocals	Tosh replaced Andy Ward for tour dates in 1982 while he was still a member, appearing on the album On the Road 1982.
	Tom Brislin	2003	keyboards; vocals	Brislin substituted for Guy LeBlanc, who was unavailable due to a family emergency, on a North American tour in June 2003.

=== Session ===
Image	Name	Years active	Instruments	Release contributions
	David Bedford	1975	orchestral arrangements	The Snow Goose (1975)
	Martin Drover	1977	trumpet; flugelhorn	Rain Dances (1977)
	Malcolm Griffiths	1977	trombone	Rain Dances (1977)
	Brian Eno	1977	Minimoog; electric piano; piano	Rain Dances (1977)
	Fiona Hibbert	1977	harp	Rain Dances (1977)
	Phil Collins	1979	percussion	I Can See Your House from Here (1979)
	Rupert Hine	1979	backing vocals	I Can See Your House from Here (1979)
	Simon Jeffes	1979	orchestral arrangements	I Can See Your House from Here (1979)
	Duncan Mackay	1980; 1982	keyboards; Prophet synthesizer	Nude (1981); The Single Factor (1982)
	Chris Green	1980	cello	Nude (1981)
	Gasper Lawal	1980	percussion	Nude (1981)
	Herbie Flowers	1980	tuba	Nude (1981)
	Haydn Bendall	1982; 1984	Yamaha CS80 synthesizer; Fairlight synthesizer; PPG synthesizer	The Single Factor (1982); Stationary Traveller (1984)
	Anthony Phillips	1982	organ; grand piano; Polymoog; ARP 2600; marimba; acoustic guitar; 12-string guitar	The Single Factor (1982)
	Francis Monkman	1982	Synclavier	The Single Factor (1982)
	Jack Emblow	1982	accordion	The Single Factor (1982)
	Tristan Fry	1982	glockenspiel	The Single Factor (1982)
	Graham Jarvis	1982	drums	The Single Factor (1982)
	Dave Mattacks	1982	drums	The Single Factor (1982)
	Simon Phillips	1982	drums	The Single Factor (1982)
	Christopher Bock	1991	drums	Dust and Dreams (1991)
	Don Harriss	1991	keyboards	Dust and Dreams (1991)
	Kim Venaas	1991	harmonica; timpani	Dust and Dreams (1991)
	James SK Wān	1991; 1994–1995	bamboo flute	Dust and Dreams (1991); Harbour of Tears (1996)
	Mae McKenna	1991; 1994–1995	vocals	Dust and Dreams (1991); Harbour of Tears (1996)
	John Burton	1991; 1994–1995	French Horn	Dust and Dreams (1991); Harbour of Tears (1996)
	Neil Panton	1991; 1994–1995	oboe; soprano sax; harmonium	Dust and Dreams (1991); Harbour of Tears (1996)
	John Xepoleas	1994–1995	drums	Harbour of Tears (1996)
	Barry Phillips	1994–1995	cello	Harbour of Tears (1996)
	Karen Bentley	1994–1995	violin	Harbour of Tears (1996)
	Anita Stoneham	1994–1995	violin	Harbour of Tears (1996)
	Terry Carleton	2002	percussion, drums	A Nod and a Wink (2002)

== Lineups ==
Period	Members	Releases
October 1971 – summer 1976	Andrew Latimer – guitar, flute, vocals; Doug Ferguson – bass, vocals; Peter Bardens – keyboards, synthesisers, vocals; Andy Ward – drums, percussion, vibraphone	Camel (1973); Mirage (1974); Live at Dingwalls Dance Hall (1974); The Snow Goose (1975); Moonmadness (1976); A Live Record (1978) – all but four tracks; On the Road 1972 (1992); Gods of Light '73–'75 (2000)
Summer 1976 – early 1977	Andrew Latimer – guitar, flute, vocals; Doug Ferguson – bass, vocals; Peter Bardens – keyboards, synthesisers, vocals; Andy Ward – drums, percussion; Mel Collins – saxophones, flute, clarinet	none
Early 1977 – July 1978	Andrew Latimer – guitar, flute, keyboards, vocals; Richard Sinclair – bass, vocals; Peter Bardens – keyboards, synthesisers, vocals; Andy Ward – drums, percussion; Mel Collins – saxophones, flute, clarinet	Rain Dances (1977); A Live Record (1978) – remaining four tracks; Breathless (1978)
July 1978 – March 1979	Andrew Latimer – guitar, flute, keyboards, vocals; Richard Sinclair – bass, vocals; Jan Schelhaas – keyboards, synthesisers; Dave Sinclair – keyboards, synthesisers; Andy Ward – drums, percussion; Mel Collins – saxophones, flute, clarinet	none
June 1979 – summer 1980	Andrew Latimer – guitar, flute, keyboards, vocals; Colin Bass – bass, vocals; Jan Schelhaas – keyboards, synthesisers; Kit Watkins – keyboards, flute, clarinet; Andy Ward – drums, percussion	I Can See Your House from Here (1979)
Summer – autumn 1980	Andrew Latimer – guitar, flute, keyboards, vocals; Colin Bass – bass, vocals; Jan Schelhaas – keyboards, synthesisers; Andy Ward – drums, percussion	Nude (1981)
January – mid-1981	Andrew Latimer – guitar, flute, keyboards, vocals; Colin Bass – bass, vocals; Jan Schelhaas – keyboards, synthesisers; Kit Watkins – keyboards, flute, clarinet; Andy Ward – drums, percussion	On the Road 1981 (1997)
Early 1982	Andrew Latimer – guitar, bass, keyboards, vocals; David Paton – bass, vocals; Chris Rainbow – keyboards, vocals	The Single Factor (1982)
Spring – autumn 1982	Andrew Latimer – guitar, flute, keyboards, vocals; Andy Dalby – guitar; David Paton – bass, vocals; Chris Rainbow – keyboards, vocals; Kit Watkins – keyboards, flute, clarinet; Stuart Tosh – drums, vocals (touring only)	On the Road 1982 (1994)
Late 1983	Andrew Latimer – guitar, flute, keyboards, vocals; David Paton – bass, vocals; Chris Rainbow – keyboards, vocals; Ton Scherpenzeel – keyboards, synthesisers; Paul Burgess – drums, percussion	Stationary Traveller (1984)
Early – summer 1984	Andrew Latimer – guitar, flute, keyboards, vocals; Colin Bass – bass, acoustic guitar, vocals; Chris Rainbow – keyboards, vocals; Ton Scherpenzeel – keyboards, synthesisers; Richie Close – keyboards; Paul Burgess – drums, percussion	Pressure Points: Live in Concert (1984)
Summer 1984 – summer 1991	Andrew Latimer – guitar, flute, keyboards, vocals; Colin Bass – bass, acoustic guitar, vocals; Ton Scherpenzeel – keyboards, synthesisers; Paul Burgess – drums, percussion	Dust and Dreams (1991)
Early 1992 – March 1993	Andrew Latimer – guitar, flute, keyboards, vocals; Colin Bass – bass, acoustic guitar, vocals; Mickey Simmonds – keyboards; Paul Burgess – drums, percussion	Never Let Go (1993)
March – May 1995	Andrew Latimer – guitar, flute, keyboards, vocals; Colin Bass – bass, acoustic guitar, vocals; Mickey Simmonds – keyboards; John Xepoleas – drums (session only)	Harbour of Tears (1996)
Summer 1996 – summer 1997	Andrew Latimer – guitar, flute, keyboards, vocals; Colin Bass – bass, acoustic guitar, vocals; Foss Patterson – keyboards, vocals; Dave Stewart – drums, percussion	Coming of Age (1998)
Summer 1997 – March 2000	Andrew Latimer – guitar, flute, keyboards, vocals; Colin Bass – bass, acoustic guitar, vocals; Dave Stewart – drums, percussion; Ton Scherpenzeel – keyboards (session only)	Rajaz (1999)
March – April 2000	Andrew Latimer – guitar, flute, keyboards, vocals; Colin Bass – bass, acoustic guitar, vocals; Guy LeBlanc – keyboards, synthesisers, vocals; Dave Stewart – drums, percussion	none
August 2000	Andrew Latimer – guitar, flute, keyboards, vocals; Colin Bass – bass, acoustic guitar, vocals; Guy LeBlanc – keyboards, synthesisers, vocals; Clive Bunker – drums, percussion	none
August 2000 – early 2003	Andrew Latimer – guitar, flute, keyboards, vocals; Colin Bass – bass, acoustic guitar, vocals; Guy LeBlanc – keyboards, synthesisers, vocals; Denis Clement – drums, percussion, keyboards	The Paris Collection (2001); A Nod and a Wink (2002); The Snow Goose (2013); In from the Cold (2014)
June 2003 (North American farewell tour lineup)	Andrew Latimer – guitar, flute, keyboards, vocals; Colin Bass – bass, acoustic guitar, vocals; Denis Clement – drums, percussion, keyboards; Tom Brislin – keyboards, vocals (substitute)	The Opening Farewell (2010)
October 2003 (European farewell tour lineup)	Andrew Latimer – guitar, flute, keyboards, vocals; Colin Bass – bass, acoustic guitar, vocals; Denis Clement – drums, percussion, keyboards; Ton Scherpenzeel – keyboards (substitute)	none
Band on hiatus 2003–2013
March – October 2013	Andrew Latimer – guitar, flute, keyboards, vocals; Colin Bass – bass, acoustic guitar, vocals; Denis Clement – drums, percussion, keyboards; Guy LeBlanc – keyboards, synthesisers, vocals; Jan Schelhaas – keyboards (touring only)	The Snow Goose (2013)
October 2013 – February 2014	Andrew Latimer – guitar, flute, keyboards, vocals; Colin Bass – bass, acoustic guitar, vocals; Denis Clement – drums, percussion, keyboards; Guy LeBlanc – keyboards, synthesisers, vocals; Jason Hart – keyboards, acoustic guitar, vocals	In from the Cold (2014)
February 2014 – February 2016	Andrew Latimer – guitar, flute, keyboards, vocals; Colin Bass – bass, acoustic guitar, vocals; Denis Clement – drums, percussion, keyboards; Jason Hart – keyboards, acoustic guitar, vocals; Ton Scherpenzeel – keyboards (substitute)	none
February 2016 – present	Andrew Latimer – guitar, flute, keyboards, vocals; Colin Bass – bass, acoustic guitar, vocals; Denis Clement – drums, percussion, keyboards; Peter Jones – keyboards, saxophones, vocals	Ichigo Ichie (Live In Japan 2016) (2017); Live at the Royal Albert Hall (2019)
