= Camel discography =

Discography of English prog rock band Camel

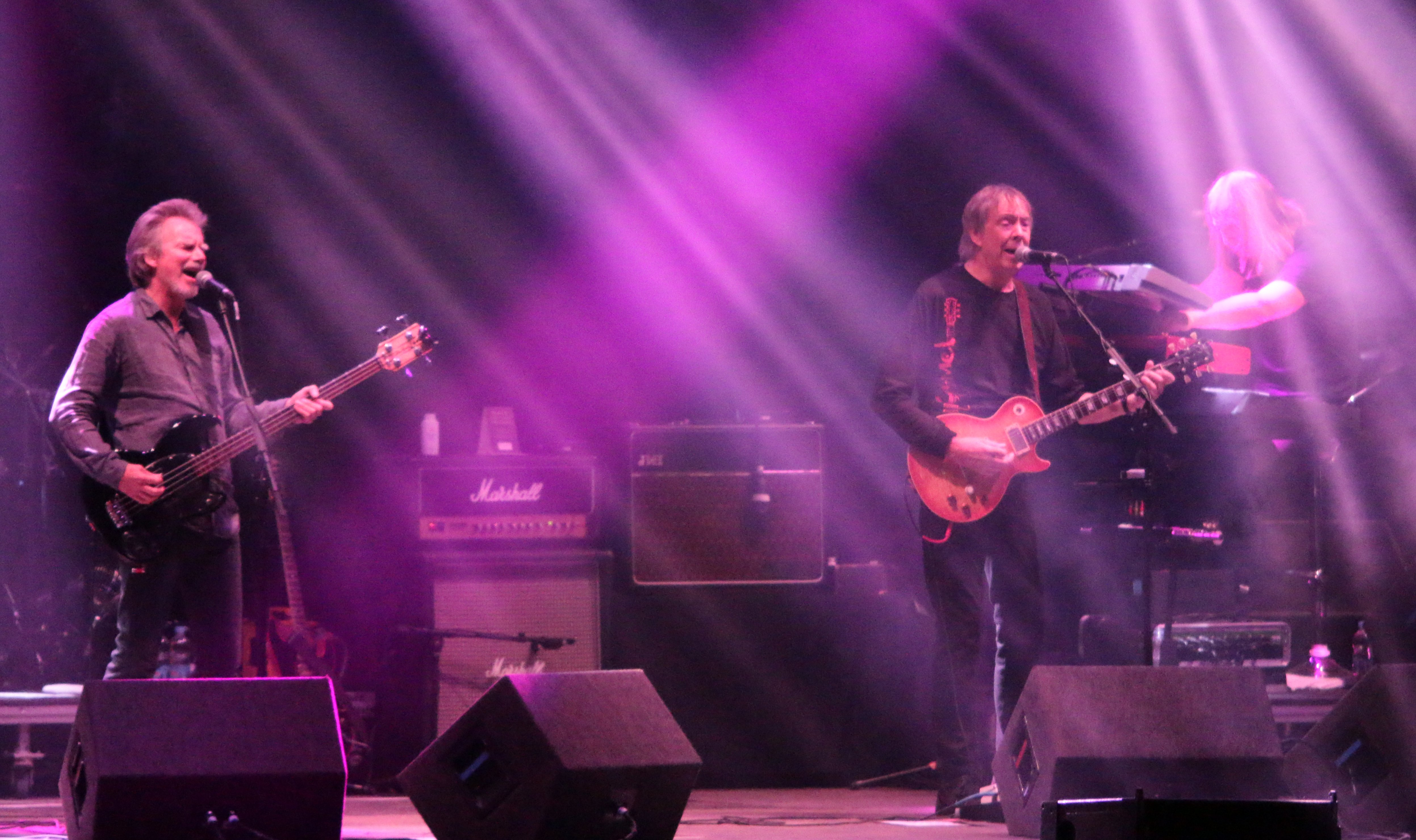
- Camel performing in 2015
- Studio albums: 14
- Live albums: 11
- Compilation albums: 8
- Singles: 14
- Video albums: 10
- Box sets: 1
- Other albums: 2

This is the discography of English progressive rock band Camel.

== Albums ==
=== Studio albums ===
Title	Album details	Peak chart positions								Certifications
Title	Album details	UK	GER	FIN	NL	NOR	SPA	SWE	US	Certifications
Camel	Released: February 1973; Label: MCA; Formats: LP	—	—	—	—	—	—	—	—	
Mirage	Released: 1 March 1974; Label: Deram, Gama, Janus; Formats: LP, MC, 8-track	—	—	—	—	—	—	—	149	
The Snow Goose	Released: 25 April 1975; Label: Decca, Gama, Janus; Formats: LP, MC, 8-track	22	—	—	—	—	—	—	162	UK: Silver
Moonmadness	Released: 26 March 1976; Label: Decca, Gama, Janus; Formats: LP, MC, 8-track	15	—	—	16	—	21	48	118	UK: Silver
Rain Dances	Released: 26 August 1977; Label: Decca, Gama, Janus; Formats: LP, MC, 8-track	20	49	29	—	17	23	30	136	
Breathless	Released: 22 September 1978; Label: Decca, Gama; Formats: LP, MC, 8-track	26	40	—	—	—	—	—	134	
I Can See Your House from Here	Released: 5 October 1979; Label: Decca, Gama, Arista; Formats: LP, MC, 8-track	45	—	—	—	18	—	36	208	
Nude	Released: 23 January 1981; Label: Decca, Gama, Passport; Formats: LP, MC	34	65	—	11	12	—	24	—	
The Single Factor	Released: 23 April 1982; Label: Decca, Gama, Passport; Formats: LP, MC	57	—	—	10	32	—	—	—	
Stationary Traveller	Released: 13 April 1984; Label: Decca, Gama, Passport; Formats: CD, LP, MC	57	—	—	16	—	—	48	—	
Dust and Dreams	Released: 10 September 1991; Label: Camel Productions; Formats: CD, LP	—	—	—	39	—	—	—	—	
Harbour of Tears	Released: 5 February 1996; Label: Camel Productions; Formats: CD, MC	—	—	—	58	—	—	—	—	
Rajaz	Released: 21 October 1999; Label: Camel Productions; Formats: CD	32	—	—	—	—	—	—	—	
A Nod and a Wink	Released: 19 July 2002; Label: Camel Productions; Formats: CD	47	—	—	—	—	—	—	—	
The Snow Goose (2013 version)	Released: November 2013; Label: Camel Productions; Formats: CD		—	—	—	—	—	—		
"—" denotes releases that did not chart or were not released in that territory.

=== Live albums ===
Title	Album details	Peak chart positions
Title	Album details	GER
A Live Record	Released: April 1978; Label: Decca, Gama; Formats: 2xLP, MC	34
Pressure Points: Live in Concert	Released: November 1984; Label: Decca; Formats: CD, LP, MC, 2CD/BR rm box	—
On the Road 1972	Released: August 1992; Label: Camel Productions; Formats: CD	—
Never Let Go	Released: June 1993; Label: Camel Productions; Formats: 2xCD	—
On the Road 1982	Released: October 1994; Label: Camel Productions; Formats: 2xCD	—
On the Road 1981	Released: 5 March 1997; Label: Camel Productions; Formats: 2xCD	—
Coming of Age	Released: April 1998; Label: Camel Productions; Formats: 2xCD	—
'73-'75 Gods of Light	Released: 2000; Label: Camel Productions; Formats: CD	—
The Paris Collection	Released: October 2001; Label: Camel Productions; Formats: CD	—
Kosei Nenkin Hall, Tokyo, January 27, 1980	Released: 1 November 2019; Label: Floating World; Formats: CD	—
Live at the Royal Albert Hall	Released: 27 April 2020; Label: Camel Productions; Formats: 2xCD	—
Earthrise - Live At The Marquee 1974	Released: 30 January 2026; Label: Esoteric; Formats: 2xCD	—
"—" denotes releases that did not chart or were not released in that territory.

=== Compilation albums ===
Title	Album details
Camel	Released: 1976; Label: Decca, Gama; Formats: 2xLP; Spain-only release
Chameleon – The Best of Camel	Released: 11 September 1981; Label: Decca, Gama; Formats: LP, MC
A Compact Compilation	Released: 1985; Label: Rhino; Formats: CD; US-only release
The Collection	Released: November 1985; Label: Castle Communications; Formats: CD, 2xLP, 2xMC
Landscapes	Released: 1991; Label: Elite; Formats: CD
Echoes – The Retrospective	Released: 1993; Label: Decca, Deram; Formats: 2xCD
Master Series	Released: 1997; Label: Deram; Formats: CD
Lunar Sea – An Anthology 1973–1985	Released: October 2001; Label: Decca; Formats: 2xCD

=== Box sets ===
Title	Album details
Rainbow's End – An Anthology 1973–1985	Released: 20 September 2010; Label: Decca/Universal UMC; Formats: 4xCD
Air Born: The MCA & Decca Years 1973-1984	Released: 24 November 2023; Label: Universal UMC; Formats: 27xCD, 5xBD

=== Video albums ===
Title	Album details
Pressure Points: Live in Concert	Released: 1984; Label: PolyGram Music Video; Formats: VHS
Coming of Age	Released: 1998; Label: Camel Productions; Formats: VHS
Curriculum Vitae	Released: September 2003; Label: Camel Productions; Formats: DVD
Footage	Released: November 2004; Label: Camel Productions; Formats: DVD
Footage II	Released: October 2005; Label: Camel Productions; Formats: DVD
Moondances	Released: November 2007; Label: Camel Productions; Formats: DVD
The Opening Farewell – Live in Concert	Released: December 2010; Label: Camel Productions; Formats: DVD
In from the Cold	Released: March 2014; Label: Camel Productions; Formats: DVD
Ichigo Ichie – Live in Japan 2016	Released: 15 January 2017; Label: Camel Productions; Formats: DVD
Live at the Royal Albert Hall	Released: 29 November 2019; Label: Camel Productions; Formats: DVD, Blu-ray

=== Other albums ===
Title	Album details
Greasy Truckers Live at Dingwalls Dance Hall	Released: 1973; Label: Greasy Truckers; Formats: 2xLP; Various artists live album that includes a 19 minute version of Camel's "God of Light Revisited"
The Snow Goose	Released: 4 November 2013; Label: Camel Productions; Formats: CD; Extended re-recording of 1975 album

== Singles ==
Title	Year	Album
"Never Let Go"	1973	Camel
"Flight of the Snow Goose"	1975	The Snow Goose
"The Snow Goose"	1975	The Snow Goose
"Another Night"	1976	Moonmadness
"Highways of the Sun"	1977	Rain Dances
"Breathless" (Japan and Spain-only release)	1978	Breathless
"Remote Romance"	1979	I Can See Your House from Here
"Your Love Is Stranger Than Mine"	1980	I Can See Your House from Here
"Lies" (Netherlands-only release)	1981	Nude
"Selva" (Netherlands-only release)	1982	The Single Factor
"No Easy Answer" (Canada, Japan and Spain-only release)	1982	The Single Factor
"Cloak and Dagger Man"	1984	Stationary Traveller
"Long Goodbyes" (Germany-only release)	1984	Stationary Traveller
"Captured" (Japan-only release)	1986	Nude
