= Bardens =

Bardens is a surname. Notable people with the surname include:

- David Bardens (born 1984), German physician
- Dennis Bardens (1911–2004), British journalist
- Peter Bardens (1945–2002), English keyboardist
