= David Minasian =

American film director

- Born: David Scott Minasian; Los Angeles, California, U.S.
- Genres: Progressive rock; symphonic rock
- Occupations: Film director; film producer; film editor; cinematographer; screenwriter; film composer; musician; songwriter; record producer; author
- Instruments: Keyboards; guitar; vocals
- Years active: 1979–present
- Label: Golden Robot Records
- Website: davidminasian.com

David Minasian is an American film producer, screenwriter, director, musician, singer, and songwriter. Since the 1980s, he has worked for various motion picture production companies in Los Angeles as a freelance producer and director. In addition to his work on music videos and concert films for artists including Three Dog Night; Moody Blues frontman Justin Hayward; Alan Parsons; and English progressive rock bands Camel and Renaissance, Minasian has produced and directed over 60 documentary films including The Passion Behind the Passion, a behind-the-scenes documentary filmed on location in Rome about the making of Mel Gibson's controversial film The Passion of the Christ. Minasian is also a classically trained pianist. His symphonic rock albums Random Acts of Beauty and The Sound of Dreams feature guest appearances by Andrew Latimer (Camel), Justin Hayward (The Moody Blues), Steve Hackett (Genesis), Annie Haslam (Renaissance), Billy Sherwood (Yes) and PJ Olsson (The Alan Parsons Live Project).

== History ==
Minasian began classical piano training at the age of five, and at the age of fifteen was asked to turn professional. However, he chose instead to pursue a career in film production. After graduating with honors with a degree in film and television from California State University, Northridge in Los Angeles, Minasian began working freelance for various production companies in the Los Angeles area as a producer, director, writer, editor, cinematographer, and composer. In between his time producing documentaries, Minasian recorded a symphonic rock album titled Tales of Heroes and Lovers which was released independently in 1984. On the album, Minasian provides piano, keyboards and lead vocals. Six of the album's nine tracks were written or co-written by Minasian. A comedic music video, produced and directed by Minasian for the album's intended single "It's Driving Me Crazy", received airplay on MTV which led to him being asked by Three Dog Night to write and direct a video for their song "A Shot in the Dark". In 1996, he recorded a second symphonic rock album titled It's Not Too Late with singer William Drews. And in 1997, Minasian began an association with Camel Productions, the production company owned by Camel which resulted in a total of 9 concert and documentary DVDs being released by Camel Productions including Coming of Age, Curriculum Vitae, The Opening Farewell and In from the Cold.

In 1998, while working as a second unit director on The Joyriders (1999) starring Oscar winner Martin Landau and Kris Kristofferson, Minasian composed the film's main theme titled "So Far from Home". The song was released as the single from the soundtrack album by EMI in 2000.

In 2009, Minasian began recording a symphonic rock album with the encouragement and participation of Camel's Andrew Latimer. Random Acts of Beauty was released on October 5, 2010 by ProgRock Records and features David on piano, keyboards, bass and lead vocals along with his son Justin Minasian on guitars. Six of the album's seven tracks were composed by David while the seventh, a 14 minute instrumental titled "Frozen in Time", is a joint composition by David and Justin. Latimer appears on the track "Masquerade" on guitar and vocals and is the first recording in eight years by Latimer after his recovery from a bone-marrow transplant.

In 2013, David Minasian began recording a follow-up album to Random Acts of Beauty but was interrupted when he was contracted to produce and direct a solo concert DVD for Justin Hayward of the Moody Blues. Recorded at the Buckhead Theatre in Atlanta on August 17, the DVD, Spirits... Live (2014), features the full concert along with a documentary filmed behind-the-scenes on Hayward's 2013 tour. After its release by Eagle Rock/Universal in the fall of 2014, the DVD reached the No. 2 position on the Billboard Music Video chart and was broadcast on PBS. A concert DVD filmed in Clearwater, Florida titled Watching and Waiting, and The Story Behind Nights in White Satin, a documentary about Hayward's 1967 composition, followed. In Spring 2016, another Hayward release from David Minasian, Live in Concert at The Capitol Theatre, came out. The DVD has the first live performance of "You Can Never Go Home" from the 1971 Every Good Boy Deserves Favour LP. Also featured was a bonus studio recording of a new song titled "The Wind of Heaven", a joint composition between Minasian and Hayward. Intended as the main theme for a forthcoming motion picture, the song, with a video directed by Minasian, was released ahead of schedule on the DVD to coincide with Hayward's 2016 US solo tour.

In 2019, Minasian released a follow-up album to Random Acts of Beauty called The Sound of Dreams which contained composition and performance contributions from a host of progressive rock icons including Justin Hayward (The Moody Blues), Steve Hackett (Genesis), Annie Haslam (Renaissance), Billy Sherwood (Yes) and PJ Olsson (The Alan Parsons Live Project). Also in 2019, he signed to Golden Robot Records (headed up by Mark Alexander-Erber and Derek Shulman, the former lead singer with Gentle Giant and a Polygram Records executive). The album was released along with a remastered version of Random Acts of Beauty. A remake of "So Far From Home" featuring Olsson as guest vocalist was released as a single along with a video. Another track from the album, "The Sound of Dreams (Third Movement)" featuring guitarist Steve Hackett was released as a follow up single and received over 250,000 hits on Spotify overnight. Soon thereafter, the "Second Movement" of the album's title track would receive over a million hits.

In 2019, Minasian travelled to Europe and the Middle East to record The Alan Parsons Live Project in concert. More than twenty cameras were used at each of the venues and two shows were released in 2020 on Blu-Ray and DVD titled The NeverEnding Show: Live In the Netherlands and One Note Symphony: Live In Tel Aviv. A music video for a studio recording, also titled The NeverEnding Show was produced by Minasian along with Trinity Houston for IM3 Global Entertainment and Frontiers Records. In 2021, a ‘greatest hits’ album, Random Dreams: The Very Best of David Minasian was released on vinyl. And in the summer of 2022, a song titled "I Won’t Be Led Astray," written by Minasian together with Alan Parsons and Kim Bullard of the Elton John Band, featuring David Pack of Ambrosia on vocals and Joe Bonamassa on guitar, was released as a single from Parsons’ latest album From The New World along with a music video produced and directed by Minasian and Houston.

== Discography ==
=== Singles ===
- It's Driving Me Crazy by Chris Lloyds (1992); Mega Records
- So Far From Home by Tracy Miller (2000); Gotee Records/EMI
- The Wind of Heaven by Justin Hayward (2016); Eagle Rock/Universal
- So Far From Home by David Minasian featuring PJ Olsson (2020); Golden Robot Records
- The Sound of Dreams (Third Movement) by David Minasian featuring Steve Hackett (2020); Golden Robot
- The Sound of Dreams (First Movement) by David Minasian featuring Annie Haslam, Steve Hackett, Billy Sherwood (2021); Golden Robot
- Masquerade by David Minasian featuring Andrew Latimer (2021); Golden Robot
- Room With Dark Corners by David Minasian featuring Julie Ragins, Geof O'Keefe, former drummer for Pentagram (2021); Golden Robot
- Summer's End by David Minasian featuring Justin Minasian (2021); Golden Robot
- I Won't Be Led Astray by Alan Parsons featuring David Pack, Joe Bonamassa (2022); Frontiers Records

=== Albums ===
- Tales of Heroes and Lovers by David Minasian (1984); New Palace/LBL
- It's Not Too Late by David Minasian & William Drews (1996); Jeremiah
- The Joyriders (Original Motion Picture Soundtrack) by Various Artists (2000); GoTee/EMI
- Random Acts of Beauty by David Minasian (2010); ProgRock
- All The Way by Justin Hayward (2016); Eagle Rock/Universal
- The Sound of Dreams by David Minasian (2020); Golden Robot
- Random Acts of Beauty (Remaster) by David Minasian (2020); Golden Robot
- Random Dreams: The Very Best of David Minasian by David Minasian (2021); Golden Robot
- From The New World by Alan Parsons (2022); Frontiers
