= Peter Bardens =

English keyboardist (1945–2002)

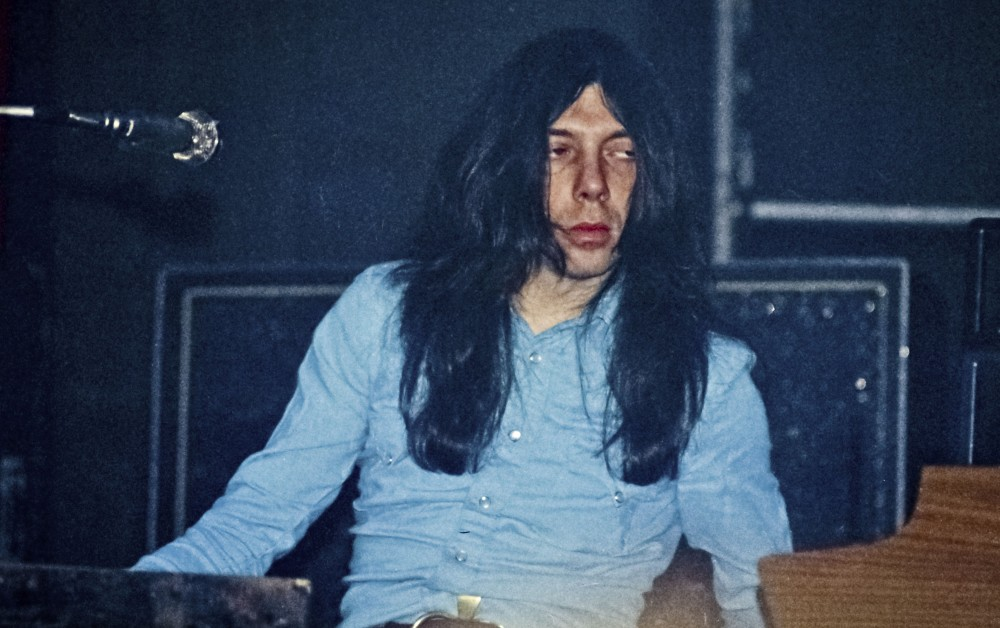
- Bardens with Camel at Volkshaus, Zürich in 1975

Background information
- Born: Peter S. Bardens; 19 June 1944; Westminster, London, England
- Died: 22 January 2002 (aged 57) Malibu, California, U.S.
- Genre: Progressive rock
- Occupation: Musician
- Instruments: Keyboards; vocals
- Years active: 1965–2002
- Labels: Transatlantic; Arista; Capitol; Miramar; HTD; Castle Music
- Formerly of: Them; Shotgun Express; Camel; Keats; Mirage

Peter S. Bardens (19 June 1944 – 22 January 2002) was an English keyboardist and a founding member of the progressive rock group Camel. He played keyboards, sang, and wrote songs with Andrew Latimer. During his career, Bardens worked alongside Rod Stewart, Peter Green, Mick Fleetwood and Van Morrison. He recorded eleven solo albums.

== Early life ==
Bardens was born in Westminster, London, England, to Marie Marks and Dennis Bardens, the latter a novelist and biographer, and grew up in Notting Hill. He studied fine art at Byam Shaw School of Art, and learned the piano, before switching to the Hammond organ after listening to Jimmy Smith.

Sources vary on Barden's birth year, either claiming he was born in 1944 or 1945, however his gravestone lists his year of birth as 1944.

== Career ==
=== 1960s ===
Bardens formed The Cheynes in 1964. He hired then unknown drummer Mick Fleetwood to join the band after hearing him play in his garage, three doors from Bardens. Fleetwood later said of this: "He literally kickstarted me into the music business." The Cheynes played a mix of pop and R&B popularised by Bo Diddley and Chuck Berry. They soon had a residency the Mandrake club in Soho, and even released a few singles.

Bardens left the Cheynes in early 1965 to join the band Them, which led to the Cheynens disbanding. His stint with the group was short, but he did play keyboards on their debut album, The Angry Young Them, released the same year. By the end of 1965, Bardens had left Them.

Following his stint with Them, he formed a band called The Peter B's, releasing a single, in 1966, called "If You Wanna Be Happy" (b/w "Jodrell Blues"), an instrumental version of the old standard. He moved on and formed Peter B's Looners which eventually morphed into Shotgun Express, a band that played soul music and featured Rod Stewart, Peter Green, and Mick Fleetwood. By 1967, Bardens had fired Stewart, and Green had been invited to join John Mayall & the Bluesbreakers, which Fleetwood soon followed, leading to Bardens disbanding Shotgun Express.

From August 1968 to February 1970, he formed The Village with featured future Elvis Costello and The Attractions bassist Bruce Thomas and Bill Porter (drums). They released a single "Man in the Moon"/"Long Time Coming".

=== 1970s ===
In 1970, Bardens recorded The Answer, an album featuring Peter Green and Andy Gee. Bardens recorded an eponymous album in 1971 which was released in the United States as Write My Name in the Dust before forming Camel in 1972. The group, a progressive rock outfit, are best known for their 1975 studio album, The Snow Goose, a concept album based on Paul Gallico's novella The Snow Goose.

He left Camel in 1978 just before the band were set to go on tour to promote their album Breathless. Bardens left Camel to join Them bandmate Van Morrison's band. He recorded Wavelength with Morrison and appeared in the line up of the album's promotional tour. By the end of the 1970s, Bardens began exploring electronica and released the album Heart to Heart in 1979.

=== 1980s ===
Bardens co-wrote "Looking for a Good Time" with Bobby Tench, featured as the B-side of the single "Chain Gang" (1982), which Tench had recorded as a tribute to Sam Cooke. In 1984, he became a member of Keats (an Alan Parsons Project offshoot) and released an album with them. Also in 1984, Bardens wrote and produced Scottish vocalist/guitarist Willy Finlayson's debut single 'On The Air Tonight', later covered by Colin Blunstone.

In 1985 he recorded the single "Solo" with the band Solo, and in 1986 he produced a Leo Sayer version of the song.

Bardens continued to release a number of solo electronic albums including Seen One Earth (1987), which found chart success in the United States. The first single from the album, "In Dreams", was met with commercial success as well. The song enjoyed heavy airplay on rock stations in the U.S. and Australia, where Triple M Brisbane, the most popular radio station in the country at the time, added it to their playlist. In 1988, he followed this with Speed of Light (1988) which featured Mick Fleetwood. "Gold" from this album was released in the U.S as a single and found some success on MTV.

=== 1990s ===
He released Water Colours in 1991, and Big Sky in 1994. Also in 1994, with his former Camel bandmate Andy Ward and former members of Caravan, he formed the band Mirage for a brief European tour. A subsequent, all-American version of the band, with only Bardens and guitarist Steve Adams from the original line-up, did more touring in 1996.

== Personal life ==
Bardens was formerly married to Julia Neale. They had two sons and one daughter.

== Death ==
His last concert, subsequent to being diagnosed with a brain tumour, was in Los Angeles in the summer of 2001. Other performers who joined him at his concert included Mick Fleetwood, John Mayall, John McVie, Sheila E. and Ben Harper.

Bardens died from lung cancer in Malibu in January 2002, at the age of 57, and is interred in the Hollywood Forever Cemetery. A double CD, Write My Name in the Dust: The Anthology 1963–2002, was released after his death and included tracks recorded throughout his career.

== Discography ==
=== Solo studio albums ===
- 1970 – The Answer
- 1971 – Peter Bardens ('Write My Name in the Dust' in the U.S.)
- 1976 – Vintage 69
- 1979 – Heart to Heart
- 1987 – Seen One Earth
- 1988 – Speed of Light
- 1991 – Water Colors
- 1993 – Further Than You Know
- 1994 – Big Sky
- 2002 – The Art of Levitation
- 2005 – Write My Name In The Dust: The Anthology 1963–2002

=== Solo singles ===
- 1971 – "Homage to the God of Light"
- 1987 – "In Dreams"
- 1988 – "Gold"
- 1988 – "Whisper in the Wind"
- 1991 – "A Higher Ground"

=== Studio albums with Them ===
- The Angry Young Them (1965)

=== Studio albums with Van Morrison ===
- Wavelength (1978)

=== Studio albums with Camel ===
- Camel (1973)
- Mirage (1974)
- The Snow Goose (1975)
- Moonmadness (1976)
- Rain Dances (1977)
- Breathless (1978)
- The Single Factor (1982) (guest)

=== Live albums with Camel ===
- Greasy Truckers Live at Dingwalls Dance Hall (1974) (Camel + Various Artists. Includes 19-minute version of Camel's 'God of Light Revisited')
- A Live Record (1978) (live, various venues 1974, 1975, 1977)
- Pressure Points: Live in Concert (1984) (live, 11 May 1984, Hammersmith Odeon, London, UK)
- On the Road 1972 (1992) (live, venue unspecified)
- Gods of Light '73-'75 (2000) (live, various venues)

=== Solo (band) singles ===
- "Solo" (1985)
