= I Can See Your House from Here =

Studio album by Camel
- Released: 5 October 1979
- Recorded: 1979
- Studios: Farmyard Studios, Little Chalfont, England
- Genre: Progressive rock
- Length: 46:04
- Label: Gama/Decca
- Producer: Rupert Hine

Camel chronology
Breathless (1978)	I Can See Your House from Here (1979)	Nude (1981)

Singles from I Can See Your House from Here
- 1. "Remote Romance" Released: 26 October 1979; 2. "Your Love Is Stranger Than Mine" Released: 29 February 1980

Professional ratings
Review scores
Source	Rating
AllMusic	3.5/5 stars
Classic Rock	7/10 stars

I Can See Your House from Here is the seventh studio album by English progressive rock band Camel. Released in 1979, a new line up was introduced with founding members Andrew Latimer (guitar) and Andy Ward (drums) joined by bassist Colin Bass (to replace Richard Sinclair) and keyboardists Jan Schelhaas (who joined in 1978 for the Breathless tour) and Kit Watkins (ex-Happy The Man) who both replaced founding member Peter Bardens. At one point, the album was going to be called Endangered Species.

== Recording ==
Work started on the album in summer 1979, collaborating with producer Rupert Hine, at the Farmyard Studios in Little Chalfont. The process also took place in an Elizabethan country house, a residential recording studio that suited the band well. The orchestral overdubs were added at London's AIR Studios. Mel Collins (who also worked with Caravan) contributed to the band's sound on the saxophone, while Phil Collins was chosen to play percussion. Andy Latimer was pleased with the end product, saying Hine "was great fun to work with, he was really up and zappy. I enjoyed making that record. We did it rather quickly and it wasn't a lengthy production."

The album was released in October 1979. It spent three weeks in the chart in late October and early November, reaching No. 45. An accompanying single was planned, but shelved. Instead a maxi single containing an edited version of Andy Latimer and Kit Watkins "Remote Romance" was backed with "Rainbow's End" from Breathless (1978) and a Camel / Mick Glossop production of "Tell Me", first released on Rain Dances (1977). It did not reach the charts. The single "Your Love is Stranger than Mine" / "Neon Magic" followed in February 1980.

== Cover artwork ==
The cover image is based on a joke that was somewhat popular at the time, in which Jesus, while hanging up on the Cross dying, calls out for his disciple Peter to come to him, who does so with great difficulty. The punchline is that Jesus merely wants to tell Peter, "I can see your house from here."

It also pays homage to the 1951 painting Christ of Saint John of the Cross by Salvador Dalí.

== Tour ==
The world tour began on 8 October at The Dome, Brighton, England, following France, Germany, Sweden, Norway, Belgium, Spain, Portugal and ended on 29 January 1980 in Koseinenkin Hall of Tokyo, Japan.

== Track listing ==
All credits adapted from the original releases.

Side one
No.	Title	Writer(s)	Notes	Length
1.	"Wait"	Andrew Latimer, John McBurnie	Personnel: Andrew Latimer – guitar, backing vocals; Kit Watkins – Yamaha electric grand and Rhodes electric pianos, Hammond C3 organ, Solina and Moog synthesizers; Jan Schelhaas – Yamaha electric grand piano, Yamaha CS-80, Prophet-5 and Moog synthesizers; Colin Bass – bass, lead vocals; Andy Ward – drums	5:02
2.	"Your Love Is Stranger Than Mine"	Colin Bass, Latimer, Jan Schelhaas, Andy Ward	Personnel: Andrew Latimer – guitar, backing vocals; Kit Watkins – Prophet-5 synthesizer; Jan Schelhaas – Yamaha electric grand piano, Minimoog; Colin Bass – bass, lead vocals; Andy Ward – drums; Mel Collins – alto saxophone	3:26
3.	"Eye of the Storm" ( (Note: This was an updated version of a track that Watkins had played with his previous band Happy the Man.))	Kit Watkins	Personnel: Andrew Latimer – guitar; Kit Watkins – Hohner Clavinet, flute, Solina and Moog synthesizers; Colin Bass – fretless Wal bass; Andy Ward – drums, massed marching military snares	3:52
4.	"Who We Are"	Latimer	Personnel: Andrew Latimer – guitar, lead vocals, flute, autoharp; Kit Watkins – Solina and Moog synthesizers; Jan Schelhaas – grand piano; Colin Bass – bass, backing vocals; Andy Ward – drums; Simon Jeffes – orchestral arrangements	7:52

Side two
No.	Title	Writer(s)	Notes	Length
1.	"Survival"	Latimer	Personnel: Simon Jeffes – orchestral arrangements; Gavin Wright – leader of the orchestra	1:12
2.	"Hymn to Her"	Latimer, Schelhaas	Personnel: Andrew Latimer – guitar, lead vocals, flute, autoharp; Kit Watkins – Hohner Clavinet, Hammond C3 organ, Solina and Moog synthesizers; Jan Schelhaas – grand piano; Colin Bass – bass, backing vocals; Andy Ward – drums	5:37
3.	"Neon Magic"	Latimer, Vivienne McAuliffe, Schelhaas	Personnel: Andrew Latimer – guitar, lead vocals; Kit Watkins – Hammond C3 organ, Yamaha CS-80 and Solina synthesizers; Jan Schelhaas – Yamaha electric grand piano, Solina, Yamaha CS-80 and Moog synthesizers; Colin Bass – bass; Andy Ward – drums	4:39
4.	"Remote Romance"	Latimer, Watkins	Personnel: Andrew Latimer – guitar; Kit Watkins – Hohner Clavinet, Yamaha CS-80 and Moog synthesizers, EMS sequencer; Jan Schelhaas – EMS sequencer; Andy Ward – drums, percussion, loops	4:07
5.	"Ice"	Latimer	Personnel: Andrew Latimer – guitar; Kit Watkins – Yamaha electric grand and Rhodes electric pianos, Hammond C3 organ, Solina and Moog synthesizers; Jan Schelhaas – grand piano; Colin Bass – bass; Andy Ward – drums	10:17

2009 Expanded & Remastered Edition
No.	Title	Length
10.	"Remote Romance" (Single version)	4:02
11.	"Ice" (Live 1981)	7:15

== Personnel ==
Camel

- Andrew Latimer – guitars, flute, backing vocals; autoharp on "Who We Are"; lead vocals on "Who We Are", "Hymn to Her" and "Neon Magic"
- Kit Watkins – Yamaha electric grand piano, Rhodes electric piano, Hohner Clavinet, Hammond C3 organ, Moog synthesizer, Minimoog, Prophet-5, Solina synthesizer, Yamaha CS-80, EMS Sequencer, flute
- Jan Schelhaas – grand piano, Yamaha electric grand piano, Moog synthesizer, Minimoog, Prophet-5, Yamaha CS-80, EMS Sequencer
- Colin Bass – bass, backing vocals; lead vocals on "Wait" and "Your Love Is Stranger Than Mine"
- Andy Ward – drums, percussion

Additional musicians

- Mel Collins – alto saxophone on "Your Love Is Stranger Than Mine"
- Phil Collins – percussion
- Rupert Hine – backing vocals
- Simon Jeffes – orchestral arrangements on "Who We Are" and "Survival"

== Charts ==
Chart (1979)	Peak position
Norwegian Albums (VG-lista)	18
Swedish Albums (Sverigetopplistan)	36
UK Albums (Official Charts)	45
