= List of Hammond organs =

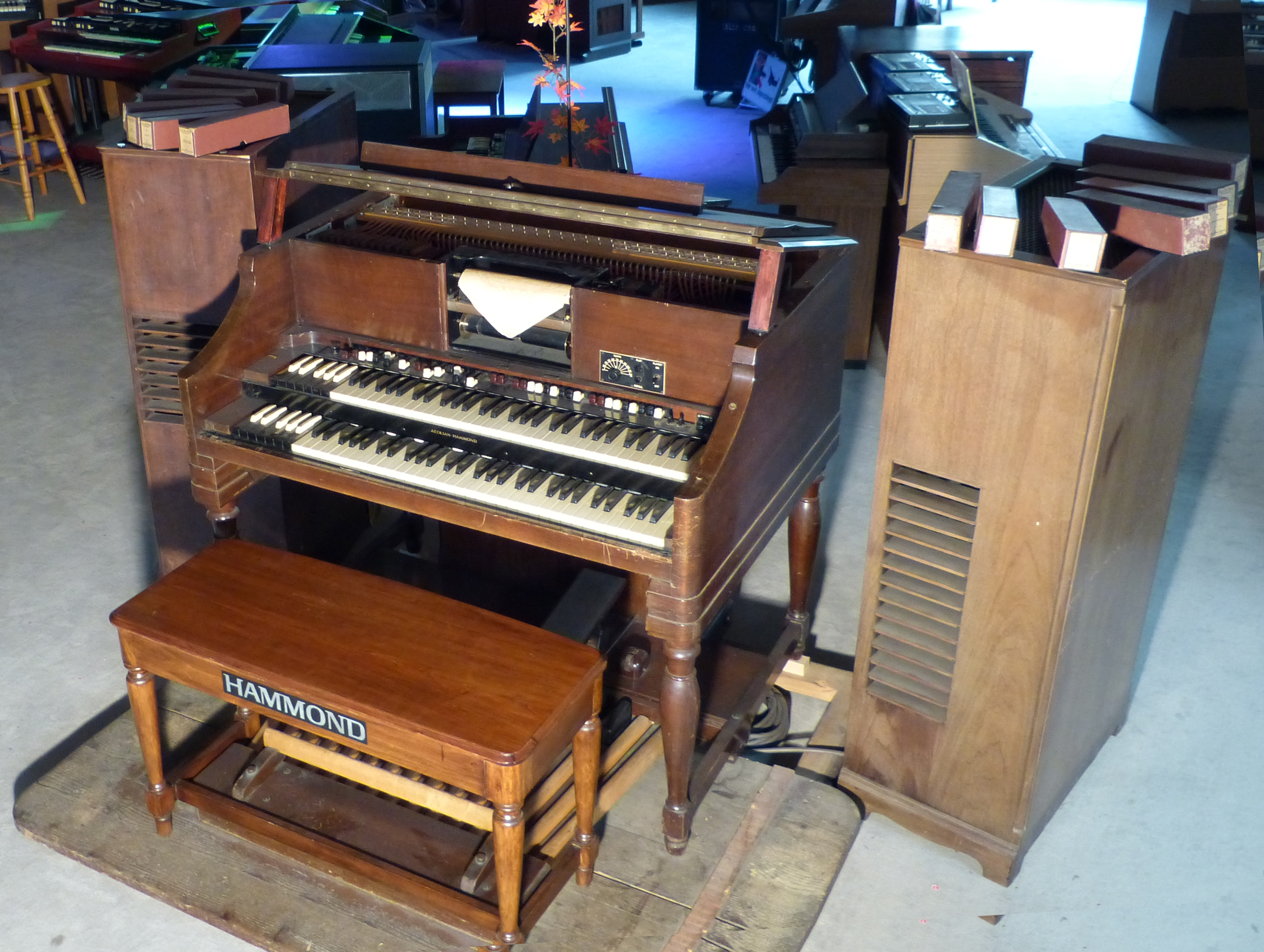
Aeolian Hammond BA player organ with Hammond tone cabinet (1938)

The Hammond organ is an electric organ, invented by Laurens Hammond and John M. Hanert and first manufactured in 1935. Various models were produced, which originally used tonewheels to generate sound via additive synthesis, where component waveform ratios are mixed by sliding switches called drawbars and imitate the pipe organ's registers. Around 2 million Hammond organs have been manufactured, and it has been described as one of the most successful organs ever. The organ is commonly used with, and associated with, the Leslie speaker.

== Tonewheel organs ==
Tonewheel organs generate sound by shaped mechanical wheels, that rotate in front of electromagnetic pickups. Each tonewheel assembly creates tones with low harmonic content, close to a sine wave. Inside the coil is a permanent magnet. As the profile of the tonewheel pass by, the strength of the magnetism changes—when the highest part is closest to the tip of the magnet, the magnetism is strongest. As the magnetism varies, an alternating current (AC) is induced in the coil, producing one of the frequencies used in harmonic synthesis.

| Image | Model Name / Number | Years produced | Description |
|---|---|---|---|
| Model A | A | 1935–1938 | The first Hammond in production. Two 61-note manuals, 25-note pedalboard, 2 x 9 drawbars per manual, 2 pedal drawbars, 9 presets per manual, a tremolo effect generator ("tremulant"). |
| | A-B | 1936–1938 /1942 | After the introduction of Model B-C in 1936, previous Model A was available as Model A-B. / B series actually starts with Model A-B. |
| | B-C | 1936–1942 | The first organ produced in the deeper Model B cabinet, to accommodate the chorus generator |
| | B-A | 1938 | Model B-C style organ with built-in player organ mechanism (possibly Duo-Art), custom built by Aeolian-Skinner. |
| | BV | 1946–1949 | Same as Model B-C but with the Hammond Vibrato and Vibrato Chorus. Model B-C itself could be converted to the Model BCV by installing these units. |
| | B-2 | 1949–1954 | Model B style cabinet with Selective Vibrato (vibrato available on either manual independently). |
| | B-3 | 1954–1974 | The best known Hammond. Similar to the B-2, but with added Touch-Response Percussion Control. Made famous by Jimmy Smith who influenced numerous other players. |
| | A-100 | 1959–1965 | Same tone-wheel generator as the B-3 / C-3 but with power amp and speakers built into the console, along with a separate Reverb amplifier and speaker. |
| | C | 1939–1942 | Almost same as Model A-B but with church style cabinet. |
| | CV | 1945–1949 | Based on Model C, Hammond Vibrato was added. Similar to the B-V, but without a chorus generator, and with in a church style cabinetry. |
| | C-2 | 1949–1954 | Identical to the B-2 except for cabinetry (Tudor-style "closed" cabinet). |
| | C-3 | 1954–1974 | The second best known Hammond. Identical to the B-3 except for cabinetry. |
| | D | 1939–1942 | A model C organ with factory supplied chorus generator |
| | D-100 | 1963–1969 | Internals of an RT-3 with built-in amp and speakers |
| | E | 1937–1949 | The first Hammond Organ with a 32-note American Guild of Organists (AGO) pedalboard. Also included toe pistons, a Great to Pedal coupler and separate Expression Pedals for Swell and Great Manuals. |
| | E-100 | 1965–1970 | A self-contained organ somewhat similar to the A-100 except for: One set of Drawbars per manual instead of two, Preset Tabs replace reverse-color Preset Keys, Percussion Voices with Reiterate instead of harmonic percussion and added Harp Sustain and rhythm effects (Cymbal and Brush) for Lower Manual and Pedals. |
| | E-200 | 1965–1971 | A version of the E-100 specifically designed for churches. Liturgical Preset Tabs, no Cymbal/Brush or Reiterate on the Percussion which plays from the Lower Manual. |
| | E-300 | 1965–1969 | A lower-cost version of the E-100. Celesta substituted for Harp Sustain in the Percussion section. |
| | G | 1941–1944 /1946 | Almost identical to model D, except for the side handles for transportation. Model G means US Government model to use on US Army and various recreational service facilities. Supplied with tone cabinet G-40 (B-40 with an extra reverb unit). Two models in Church-styled cabinet were made under military specifications, and named G (G for "Government contract", with chorus), and G-2 (with vibrato), to be installed in chapels and officer's messes of U.S. Army and Navy. Later, Government model was taken over by model C-2G (1952-1953) and C-3G (1955-?). |
| | G-100 | 1964–1967 | Non-drawbar tone-wheel organ built completely to AGO specifications. Included 65 stop tablets, 12 couplers, 18 thumb pistons, 8 toe pistons. Also known as the Grand-100. |
| | H-100 | 1965–1969 | Deluxe self-contained tone-wheel organ with extra tonewheels for higher pitched tones. Also included reverse-color Preset Keys, Mixture Drawbars for additional harmonic, String Bass (pedal sustain), Stereo Reverb and stereo chorus and vibrato scanners. 50 Watts of three-channel amplification. |
| | H-262 | 1969–1975 | Version of the H-100 designed for churches. |
| | HX-100 | 1970-1975 | Version of the H-100 in an X-66-style case for stage work. Supplied with D10 speaker. |
| | L-100 series | 1961–1968 | First Hammond to retail for under £1,000.: L-100A Same as L-100 but with additional Percussion voices such as Guitar, Banjo, etc., alternating reiteration on Xylophone and Marimba and rhythm effects (Cymbal and Brush) for the Lower Manual and Pedals.; L-200 Included built-in Rhythm II rhythm unit. |
| | Porta B series | 1971–1974 (1970) | Portable version of L-100 series for professional use. There were several versions on each country, built by different factories: L-100NS / L-PNS-100 – USA version (LP-100 ?); L-100-PN / L-100PNS – Belgian version, also sold in Netherlands. S means a version with pedal sustain.; P-100 / L-100-P – converted L-102, sold in Germany and Denmark.; P-100-S – a version with pedal sustain (1972–1974); P-100-H |
| | M | 1948–1951 | First spinet organ. 2x44 key manuals, 12 note pedalboard. |
| | M-2 | 1951–1955 | An M with Selective Vibrato (Vibrato available on either Manual separately). |
| | M-3 | 1955–1964 | Same as M-2 but with Touch-Response Percussion Control. |
| | M-100 | 1961–1968 | Tone-wheel spinet organ, replacing the M series. Added features include Presets, Vibrato Celeste and Stereo Reverb. Also the Legato Pedal control is controlled by a tablet, replacing the foot switch on the M-series organs. |
| | R-100 | 1970–1975 | Self-contained organ based on the E-100 but with transistor / solid-state power amp, built-in Leslie (no scanner vibrato) and Pedal String Bass. |
| | RT | 1949 | Replacement for the Model E. Similar cabinet style to models C and D but with 32 note AGO pedalboard and electronic Pedal Solo Unit. |
| | RT-2 | 1949–1954 | Similar to RT but with Selective Vibrato. |
| | RT-3 | 1954–1969 | Same as RT-2 but with added Touch-Response Percussion Control. |
| | T-100 series | 1968–1975 | A tonewheel spinet with a transistor / solid-state power amplifier: TTR-100: portable T-100 produced for the European market.; T-200: T-100 with built in leslie and extra percussion.; T-400: as T-200 but with Drum machine.; T-500: as T-400 but revised case.Last tonewheel built.; XTP: Futuristic T-500 with pull out speakers leaving organ on pedestal. |
| | X-66 | 1967–1973 | 12-tone tonewheel generator with frequency divider and various additional features |
| | X-77 | 1968–1973 | A restyled H-100, designed to replace the B-3. Had its own Leslie cabinet, the X-77L |

== Vacuum tube musical instruments ==
Vacuum tube musical instruments mean electronic musical instruments generating sound with vacuum tube-based electronic oscillators. Hammond Organ Company commercialized it in the late-1930s as Novachord (1939–1942) and Solovox (1940–1948). Especially, new designs introduced on Novachord — subtractive synthesis and frequency divider — were immediately followed by many manufacturers of electronic organs and polyphonic synthesizers during the 1940s-1970s. However, Hammond Organ Company did not adopt these on main products until the 1960s, except for S series chord organ (1950–1966) and "Solo Pedal Unit" on RT series and D-100 (1949–1969).

| Image | Model Name / Number | Years produced | Description |
|---|---|---|---|
| | Novachord (model H) | 1939–1942 | First commercial polyphonic synthesizer. Although Novachord itself is not referred to as an electronic organ, its basic design became mainstream, being implemented in electronic organs and polyphonic synthesizers during 1940s-1970s. |
| | Solovox (model J, K, L) | 1940–1950 | Monophonic attachment keyboard instrument, intended to accompany the pianos with lead voice of organ and orchestral sound. It consists of two units — a 3-octave mini keyboard attaching under the piano keyboard, and a tone cabinet including electronic sound generator, amplifier and loudspeaker. The sound generator is based on a vacuum tube oscillator and octave divider circuits originally designed for Novachord. There are three minor changed models: Model J (1940–1946); Model K (1946–1948); Model L (1948–1950) |
| | Solo Pedal Unit on RT series and D-100 | 1949–1969 | Solo Pedal Unit (or Pedal Solo Unit) provides a monophonic bright bass sound on RT series and model D-100 consoles, layered with traditional polyphonic tonewheel pedal sound. Although Solo Pedal Unit is highest-note priority and it can play only one note at a time, the players can play polyphonic bass lines by the help of traditional pedal sound. The sound generator is electrically similar to Solovox Model L. It consists of a vacuum tube oscillator and five frequency divider circuits, controlled by a volume and 8-stop tablets (Bourdon 32', Bombarde 32', 16', 8', 4', 2' & 1', mute, pedal solo on) placed on the right side of lower manual. Although there are five revisions of units, these are interchangeable on all RT series consoles. |
| | S series Chord Organ | 1950–1966 | First chord organ. Its "easy to play" style initiated a new market segment leading to today's home keyboard market. The S series Chord Organ can be played via following interfaces: 37-note keyboard for solo or chords; 96-chord buttons (12-semitones × 8-chords variation) for chords; 2 wire touch-plates for strumming effect; 2 bass pedals for root & 5th; 1 expression pedal (or knee lever) for total volume control; 3 volume knobs for volume of each part (solo, chord, bass) |
| | F-100 Extravoice (model A, B) | 1960-1961 / 1961-1964 | Descended from the Novachord and are more like a tube synthesizer than an organ, with nothing in common with the tonewheel Hammond models. They produce totally unique sounds that can be mellow and haunting or brash and quirky. They also incorporate the circuitry from a Solovox monophonic tube synthesizer, with more tonal options and greater stability than the Solovox models typically have. Used in Fiona Apple's track "Fast As You Can". |

== Transistor organs ==
Hammond started to produce transistor organs when the production of tonewheels became too expensive, switching to full-time Integrated Circuit (IC) models in 1975.

| Image | Model Name / Number | Years produced | Description |
|---|---|---|---|
| | Aurora (Century, Custom and Classic) | 1975-81 | First composite spinet organ with both drawbars and electronic voices, no tonewheels. Classic top of range with strings brass and presets.Final model had pro-chord. |
| | B3000 | 1978 (or 1975) | Solid-state copy of the B-3, with additional string division, electric and grand pianos. Key click was re-introduced. Supplied with matching Leslie HL-722. |
| VS-150 VS-300 VS-350 | Cadette (model V, VS) | 1969–1970s | Entry-level all-tab transistor spinet organ, no tonewheels. This series were all designed in the United States, built in Japan, and subsequently also assembled in England: Initially, first series were built by Yamaha (c.1969–), then by Nihon Hammond during 1973–1975. Subsequently Hammond UK began to import these models in kit form, and assembled in proper wooden cases for domestic market. |
| | Chord | 1965–1969 | Transistor organ with 48 chord buttons. |
| | Colonnade | 1979 | Console version of Aurora Classic. |
| | Commodore | 1979-81 | 9 upper and 9 lower drawbars. |
| | Composer | 1982–83 | Transistor organ with "Compose-a-chord" feature. |
| | Concorde | 1972 - c.1977 (or 1973) | First LSI-based Hammond console organ with drawbars, no tonewheels. This model was once erroneously advertised as a next generation top model take over the X-77, called X-99; though, its official name was the Concorde. |
| | Cougar | 1973–1976 | Transistor spinet organ with drawbars, in some extent, corresponded to a kind of successor of L-100 series tonewheel spinet organ, although its new drawbars arrangement is slightly exotic; its upper manual has normal nine drawbars; on the other hand, lower manual has only two 8' drawbars with sawtooth. This anomalous design was only followed by a few models (8000 series, 8100 series, and 8200 Aurora series). |
| | Dolphin | 1973–1976 | Spinet organ with 20 one finger chords. Dolphin 9900 series in 1976 has the built-in polyphonic synthesizer. |
| | Elegante | 1980-1981 | Hammond 1980s Flagship 2x61 note manuals, 25 pedals, Tonebars, Multiplex Synthesiser, Easy Play, 9 pistons, 4 speakers plus Leslie. Unlikel the contemporary Romance series, the electronics were mostly discrete transistors apart from the 440 multiplex generator and 434/435 LSI chips in the rhythm and auto-play boards. |
| | Grandee | 1975-? | Grandee (11100 and 11200(M) series), released in 1975, was a model that enjoyed great interest in the Low Countries. It equipped full features at that time: 61×2 keys, 25 pedal with sustain, IC based tone generator, Delay Vibrato or Leslie & Vibrato, Reverb & Sustain, Auto-Vari 64 Rhythm, Automatic Accompaniment, Arpeggiator, etc. |
| Model J-112 | J-100 series | 1967–1968 (Late 1960s) | Transistor spinet organ - no tonewheels |
| Model K-102 | K-100 series | (Late 1960s) | Transistor spinet organ - no tonewheels. |
| | Maverick | 1973–1975 | Middle-priced all-tab spinet organ. |
| | Monarch | 1975-77 | Console organ 1975-77 |
| | Phoenix | 1972 | First LSI-based all-tab Hammond spinet organ. |
| | Piper Autochord | 1970–1979 | First automatic chording instrument. Single manual, with automatic rhythm, automatic chording and no bass pedals. |
| | Portable B-100 | 1980–1984 | Single manual version of B-250. Manufactured by Nihon Hammond. |
| | Portable B-200 | — | Successor of X-5, portable version of Aurora 8222. |
| | Portable B-250 | 1980–1984 | 2 x 61 note manuals. Manufactured by Nihon Hammond. |
| | Portable B-300 | — | B-200 plus strings, portable version of Aurora Classic 232000. |
| Composer 146 (a sibling model) | Portable B-400 | 1984–? | Only drawbars to upper, digital drum machine, digital solo voice, human choirs, and MIDI. |
| | Portable X-2 | 1978 | Single manual version of X-5. |
| | Portable X-5 | 1975 | Portable spinet, an IC-based organ similar to the Porta-B (but its features are closer to the T100), derived from Ace Tone GT-7 circa 1971. Manufactured by Nihon-Hammond, a Japanese joint venture between main company and Sakata (parent company of Ace Tone). |
| | Regent | 1973–1976 | First all-tab theatre style Hammond organ. |
| | Romance series | 1977–1983 | Integrated circuit generated spinet organ. No drawbars. |
| | Sounder | 1973-1976 | First Hammond to retail for under $500, sold through both music and mass merchant outlets. Single manual organ. |

== Digital organs ==
After the Hammond Organ Company ceased trading in 1985, production initially went to Noel Crabbe's Hammond Organ Australia, and then to Suzuki Musical Instrument Corporation, who, under the name Hammond-Suzuki, manufacture digital organs.

| Image | Model Name / Number | Years produced | Description |
|---|---|---|---|
| | Super B | 1986 | First full-digitally sampled Hammond organ, with dual manual, downloadable voice tables, and MIDI. Manufactured by Suzuki-Hammond, the predecessor of later Hammond-Suzuki. |
| | Super CX-2000 | 1988 | CX-2000 and its minor model SX-2000, probably released by Hammond Suzuki in 1988, were based on the predecessors, SX-1 & CX-1. Newly expanded "Orchestral Section" was two groups/banks of digitally sampled orchestral voices that can be combined with the drawbars and strings group. |
| | EX-1000 | 1989 | EX-1000 was one of the first models built by Hammond Suzuki in Japan. Later the minor models EX-700 and 800 were added. This model had 3 types of expansion cards: (1) Voice ROM cards (extra sounds), (2) Autoband Style cards (rhythm and accompaniments), (3) RAM cards (user memory, 16K and 32K) |
| | XB-2 | 1991–1998 | Single manual organ. First digital organ produced by Hammond-Suzuki. Tone generator was same as Super B. |
| | XB-3 | 1993–1998 | Dual manual organ with 4 sets of drawbars, reverse colour presets and waterfall keys. In an extended B3 case. |
| | XB-5 | 1993—? | Two manual organ with two sets of drawbars and bass drawbars. |
| | XM-1 / XM-c1 | 1997–2005 | MIDI organ module (XM-1) with drawbar controller (XM-c1) |
| | XB-1 | 1998–2005 | Standalone version of the XM-1. / Cost-cut model using DSP technology (32-voice polyphony, DSP effects including Leslie-simulator, and the simplify of Leslie connector). |
| | XK-2 | 1999–2004 | Improved XB-2 with waterfall keys |
| | XE series | c. 2000 –? | XE-1 / XE-2 / XE-200: Modular all singing and dancing single manual modular organ (XE-1), dual manual(XE-2), and built in cabinet (XE-200) |
| | New B-3 | 2003–present | A replica of the original B-3 with digitally generated tonewheel simulation |
| | XK-1 | 2005–2011 | Cut down version of XK-3, but extended vib/cho settings later in XK-3C |
| | XM-2 / XM-c2 | 2005–present | MIDI module version of the XK-1 |
| | XK-3 | 2004–2007 | Same internals as a New B-3 with cheaper keyboard base and built in Leslie simulator. Can be expanded with optional lower manual, stand and pedalboard. |
| | XK-3c | 2007–present | Updated version of the XK-3 |
| | SK1 | 2011–2020 | Stage keyboard with pianos and other instrument samples as well as organ |
| | SK-2 | 2011–2020 | Dual manual SK-1 |
| | XK-1c | 2013–present | Improved XK-1 |
| | XK-5 | 2016–present | 4 drawbar sets + pedal like B3, improved multicontact shallow keybed etc. |
| | SK-X | 2018–2020 | Replaced SK-2 and has 2 sets of drawbars, improved interface and 11-pin Leslie connector |
