= Dennis Bardens =

British writer (1911–2004)

Dennis Bardens (born 19 July 1911 in Midhurst, Sussex – 7 February 2004 London) "played a brief, but crucial, role in broadcasting history" as the founder of the BBC television programme Panorama, a show which would later inspire the American television show 60 Minutes. Dennis Bardens was a freelance London journalist for most of his career.

== Biography ==
According to his obituary Bardens journalistic career involved work at all the major London newspapers, and even a stint as a spy during World War II. In the words of The Guardian:

"Meanwhile, Bardens was proving himself as a journalist, working, during the 1930s, for the Sunday Chronicle, Sunday Express and Daily Mirror. In 1940, he became a distinguished reporter of the Blitz. After discharge from the Royal Artillery on medical grounds, he spent two years with the Ministry of Information, and was in charge of coordinating plans for newspaper services in Britain in the event of a German invasion. In 1943, he was transferred to liaison work with the Czechoslovak government in exile, which included, at the end of the war, secret service work in Czechoslovakia."

After the war Bardens published history and biography in addition to his occasional journalism. These include, the following, which is not an inclusive list.

Elizabeth Fry (1961)
Churchill in Parliament (1969)
Portrait of a statesman: the personal life story of Sir Anthony Eden (1955)
Lord Justice Birkett (1962)
Princess Margaret (1965)
A History of Barrow Hepburn & Gale (1947)

Dennis Barden's books also demonstrate his interest in psychic phenomena, an interest he shared with his good friend, Austin Osman Spare. Bardens wrote Ghosts and Hauntings 1965, Mysterious Worlds (1970) and Psychic Animals: An Investigation of Their Secret Powers (1990).

Bardens was a member of The Ghost Club and Ghost Club Society, as well as International Pen, the Society of Authors and the National Union of Journalists. He married Marie Marks in 1936, and their only child Peter Bardens (1944–2002) became a rock keyboard musician.

Dennis Bardens was a keen Freemason and a member of several Lodges in England, mostly meeting at Great Queen Street in London.

Bardens was a member of the Travellers Club located in Pall Mall as a result of his Intelligence work for the Security Services and travel overseas.

Through his close friendship and association with the artist and occultist Austin Osman Spare, Bardens had contact with Aleister Crowley (who in turn had been a friend of Spare). Spare had an unspecified disagreement with Crowley which ended their friendship.
