= Pressure Points: Live in Concert =

Live album by Camel
- Released: November 1984
- Recorded: 11 May 1984
- Venue: Hammersmith Odeon, London
- Genre: Progressive rock
- Length: 46:51; 84:58 (2009 expanded version)
- Label: Decca
- Producer: Andy Latimer

Camel live albums chronology
A Live Record (1978)	Pressure Points: Live in Concert (1984)	On the Road 1972 (1992)

Professional ratings
Review scores
Source	Rating
AllMusic	2/5 stars
Classic Rock	7/10 stars

Pressure Points: Live in Concert is the second live album by English progressive rock band Camel, released in 1984. A remastered version with six bonus tracks was released in 2009 as a double CD Set.

== Pressing Error on Original Release ==
This LP also has strong interest with vinyl collectors. When it was first released on LP in 1984 the record was pressed incorrectly (with each side matched with the wrong labels) due to a production error. On the reverse of all 1st Pressings of this LP it states:- "SKL 5338 NOTE:- we regret that, due to a production error, the label on Side 2 refers to the tracks on Side 1, whilst the label on Side 1 refers to the tracks on Side 2". This error was corrected very quickly, and most of the stickers were removed by buyers on purchase. Therefore, any 'mispressed' 1st Pressings of this LP with this error are now very rare indeed.

== Track listing ==
Music by Andrew Latimer, unless noted. Lyrics by Susan Hoover except where noted.

Side one

1. "Pressure Points" – 7:17
2. "Drafted" – 3:51
3. "Captured" – 3:02
4. "Lies" – 5:16
5. "Sasquatch" – 4:09

Side two

1. "West Berlin" – 5:19
2. "Fingertips" – 4:48
3. "Wait" (Lyrics by John McBurnie) – 4:28
4. "Rhayader" (Music by Latimer, Peter Bardens) – 2:29
5. "Rhayader Goes to Town" (Music by Latimer, Peter Bardens) – 6:05

== Track listing 2009 Expanded & Remastered Edition ==
Disc 1

1. "Pressure Points" – 7:17
2. "Drafted" – 3:50
3. "Captured" – 3:02
4. "Lies" – 5:10
5. "Refugee" [Previously unreleased on CD] – 3:48
6. "Vopos" [Previously unreleased on CD] – 5:49
7. "Stationary Traveller" [Previously unreleased on CD] – 5:16
8. "West Berlin" – 5:18
9. "Fingertips" – 4:40

Disc 2

1. "Sasquatch" – 4:05
2. "Wait" – 4:20
3. "Cloak and Dagger Man" [Previously unreleased on CD] – 4:03
4. "Long Goodbyes" [Previously unreleased on CD] – 6:45
5. "Rhayader" – 2:28
6. "Rhayader Goes to Town" – 6:27
7. "Lady Fantasy" (Bardens, Latimer, Doug Ferguson, Andy Ward)[Previously unreleased on CD] – 12:40

== Personnel ==
Camel

- Andrew Latimer – lead guitar, pan flute, vocals, producer
- Ton Scherpenzeel – lead keyboards
- Chris Rainbow – vocals, keyboards
- Richie Close – keyboards
- Colin Bass – bass, vocals
- Paul Burgess – drums, percussion

Guest appearance

- Pete Bardens – organ on "Rhayader" & "Rhayader Goes to Town"
- Mel Collins – saxophone on "Fingertips" & "Rhayader Goes to Town"

Production

- David Woolley, Haydn Bendall – engineers
- Mick McKenna – assistant engineer
- Jonny Bealby – tape operator
