= The Single Factor =

Studio album by Camel
- Released: 23 April 1982
- Recorded: January–February 1982
- Studio: Abbey Road Studios (London)
- Genres: Pop rock; progressive rock
- Length: 39:01
- Label: Gama/Decca
- Producers: Tony Clarke, Andy Latimer and Haydn Bendall for Gama Records Ltd.

Camel chronology
Nude (1981)	The Single Factor (1982)	Stationary Traveller (1984)

Professional ratings
Review scores
Source	Rating
AllMusic	2/5 stars

The Single Factor, released in 1982, is the ninth studio album by English progressive rock band Camel. The album was essentially a contractual obligation album, created under pressure from Decca Records to produce a hit single, and the "made-to-order" nature of its composition resulted in a selection of songs described as "odd" on the band's official website. Unlike previous Camel albums, The Single Factor consists exclusively of shorter compositions around 3 to 5 minutes in length.

Guitarist Andrew Latimer was the only original member remaining, although original keyboardist Peter Bardens returned for a guest appearance on 'Sasquatch'. According to the liner notes, original drummer Andy Ward, who had appeared in all previous Camel albums, was now absent "following a serious injury to his hand". In reality the injury was self-inflicted, and years later it was revealed that he was forced to retire due to mental health problems.

The album was reissued on 8 September 2009 by Esoteric Recordings with a bonus version of "You Are the One".

== Background ==
Anthony Phillips, an original member of Genesis, is featured on the album, playing guitar, organ and synthesizer. According to Phillips, a song "with big Genesis-sounding, slightly choral keyboard phrases with super soaring guitar over it" was also recorded for the album, but the band decided to leave it off "because it didn't have 'the Single Factor'."

In the United Kingdom, promotional efforts included a national flyposting campaign, point of sale displays, London Underground posters, and advertising in the national and local press.

== Track listing ==
Side one
No.	Title	Writer(s)	Notes	Length
1.	"No Easy Answer"	Andrew Latimer	Personnel: Andy Latimer - guitar, lead vocals, piano; Chris Rainbow - backing vocals; David Paton - bass, backing vocals; Graham Jarvis - drums	2:59
2.	"You Are the One"	Latimer	Personnel: Andy Latimer - guitar, lead vocals, keyboards; David Paton - bass; Graham Jarvis - drums	5:25
3.	"Heroes"	Latimer, Susan Hoover	Personnel: Andy Latimer - guitar, piano solo; Chris Rainbow - backing vocals; Haydn Bendall - Yamaha CS80 synthesizer; Anthony Phillips - grand piano, organ; David Paton - fretless bass, lead vocals; Dave Mattacks - drums	4:52
4.	"Selva" (instrumental)	Latimer	Personnel: Andy Latimer - electric guitar; Anthony Phillips - classical acoustic guitar; Duncan Mackay - Prophet synthesizer	3:34
5.	"Lullabye"	Latimer	Personnel: Andy Latimer - lead vocals, piano	0:59

Side two
No.	Title	Writer(s)	Notes	Length
1.	"Sasquatch" (instrumental)	Latimer	Personnel: Andy Latimer - electric guitar; Anthony Phillips - Rickenbacker 12-string guitar; Peter Bardens - organ, Minimoog synthesizer; David Paton - bass; Simon Phillips - drums	4:44
2.	"Manic"	Latimer, Hoover	Personnel: Andy Latimer - guitar, lead vocals, Mellotron, bass; Anthony Phillips - grand piano, organ, Polymoog; Francis Monkman - Synclavier harpsichord; Graham Jarvis - drums; Tristan Fry - glockenspiel	4:28
3.	"Camelogue"	Latimer, Hoover	Personnel: Andy Latimer - guitar, lead vocals; Chris Rainbow - backing vocals; David Paton - bass, backing vocals; Graham Jarvis - drums	3:44
4.	"Today's Goodbye"	Latimer, Hoover	Personnel: Andy Latimer - guitar, lead vocals, organ; Chris Rainbow - backing vocals; David Paton - bass, backing vocals; Graham Jarvis - drums	4:10
5.	"A Heart's Desire"	Latimer, Hoover	Personnel: Andy Latimer - piano; Chris Rainbow - lead vocals; Jack Emblow - accordion	1:11
6.	"End Peace" (instrumental)	Latimer, Anthony Phillips	Personnel: Andy Latimer - guitar; Anthony Phillips - grand piano, Polymoog and ARP 2600 synthesizers, marimba	2:55

2009 Expanded & Remastered Edition
No.	Title	Length
12.	"You Are the One" (Edited version)	3:49

== Personnel ==
- Andy Latimer – lead vocals, guitar, piano, keyboards, Mellotron (B 2), organ (B 4), bass (B 2), flute (A 3)
- David Paton – bass, backing vocals, lead vocals (A 3)
- Chris Rainbow – backing vocals, lead vocals (B 5)
- Anthony Phillips – organ (A 3, B 2), grand piano (A 3, B 2, 6), Polymoog (B 2, 6), ARP 2600 (B 6), marimba (B 6), acoustic guitar (A 4), 12-string guitar (B1)
- Graham Jarvis – drums
- Peter Bardens – organ, Minimoog (B1)
- Haydn Bendall – Yamaha CS80 synthesizer (A 3)
- Duncan Mackay – Prophet synthesizer (A 4)
- Francis Monkman – Synclavier (B 2)
- Dave Mattacks – drums (A 3)
- Simon Phillips – drums (B 1)
- Tristan Fry – glockenspiel (B 2)
- Jack Emblow – accordion (B 5)

Production

- Tony Clarke – engineer

== Charts ==
Chart (1982)	Peak position
Dutch Albums (Album Top 100)	10
Norwegian Albums (VG-lista)	32
Spanish Albums (AFYVE)	30
UK Albums (Official Charts)	57
