= Never Let Go (album) =

Never Let Go (live)

Live album by Camel
- Released: 30 July 1993
- Recorded: 5 September 1992
- Venue: De Bastille, University of Twente, Enschede, Netherlands
- Genre: Progressive rock
- Label: Camel Productions
- Producer: Andy Latimer

Camel live albums chronology
| On the Road 1972 (1992) | Never Let Go (live) (1993) | On the Road 1982 (1994) |

Professional ratings
Review scores
| Source | Rating |
|---|---|
| AllMusic | 4/5 stars |

Never Let Go is the fourth live album by the British progressive rock band Camel, released in 1993. It was recorded in Enschede, the Netherlands, 5 September 1992.

== Track listing ==
Disc one

1. "Never Let Go" (Latimer) – 7:22
2. "Earthrise" (Bardens, Latimer) – 8:02
3. "Rhayader" (Bardens, Latimer) – 2:23
4. "Rhayader Goes to Town" (Bardens, Latimer) – 5:14
5. "Spirit of the Water" (Bardens) – 3:03
6. "Unevensong" (Bardens, Latimer, Ward) – 5:44
7. "Echoes" (Bardens, Latimer, Ward) – 7:48
8. "Ice" (Latimer) – 10:21
9. "City Life" (Hoover, Latimer) – 5:10
10. "Drafted" (Hoover, Latimer) – 4:12

Disc two

1. "Dust Bowl" (Latimer) – 1:58
2. "Go West" (Latimer) – 3:47
3. "Dusted Out" (Latimer) – 1:36
4. "Mother Road" (Hoover, Latimer) – 3:44
5. "Needles" (Latimer) – 3:31
6. "Rose of Sharon" (Hoover, Latimer) – 5:32
7. "Milk 'n' Honey" (Latimer) – 3:28
8. "End of the Line" (Hoover, Latimer) – 7:27
9. "Storm Clouds" (Hoover, Latimer) – 3:16
10. "Cotton Camp" (Latimer) – 2:28
11. "Broken Banks" (Latimer) – 0:45
12. "Sheet Rain" (Latimer) – 2:20
13. "Whispers" (Latimer) – 1:06
14. "Little Rivers and Little Rose" (Latimer) – 2:10
15. "Hopeless Anger" (Latimer) – 4:54
16. "Whispers in the Rain" (Latimer) – 3:56
17. "Sasquatch" (Latimer) – 4:58
18. "Lady Fantasy" (Camel) – 15:28

== Personnel ==
Camel

- Andrew Latimer – guitars, flutes, keyboards, vocals
- Mickey Simmonds – keyboards
- Colin Bass – bass guitar, keyboards, vocals
- Paul Burgess – drums
