= The Snow Goose (album) =

Studio album by Camel
- Released: 25 April 1975
- Recorded: January 1975
- Studios: Island, London; Decca, London
- Genres: Progressive rock; instrumental rock
- Length: 43:34
- Label: Gama/Decca
- Producer: David Hitchcock

Camel chronology
Mirage (1974)	The Snow Goose (1975)	Moonmadness (1976)

Singles from The Snow Goose
- 1. "Flight of the Snow Goose" Released: 16 May 1975; 2. "The Snow Goose" Released: 19 September 1975

Professional ratings
Review scores
Source	Rating
AllMusic	4/5 stars

The Snow Goose (alternatively, "Music Inspired by the Snow Goose") is the third studio album by the band Camel, released in the U.K. on 25 April 1975.

== Recording ==
The critical success of "The White Rider" suite (based on J. R. R. Tolkien's The Lord of the Rings and appearing on the band's previous 1974 album, Mirage) prompted the group to write more novel-inspired conceptual suites.

The band considered several novels on which to base their next album. For a time they settled on Siddhartha, by Hermann Hesse, and some songs were written before the idea was abandoned in favour of Paul Gallico's novella The Snow Goose. The album's name, originally The Snow Goose, was altered to Music Inspired by The Snow Goose to accommodate legal protests by Gallico. (Note: Gallico's protests were not motivated by a disapproval of smoking as he was a keen smoker, but simply on the grounds of copyright infringement.) The album was originally due to feature lyrics based on Gallico's text, but this was abandoned due to the copyright objections. The music was mostly written over a fortnight in a cottage in Devon, England.

Recording began in January 1975 at Island Studios in London with producer David Hitchcock and engineer Rhett Davies. Later overdubs were recorded at Decca Studios and engineered by John Burns. The London Symphony Orchestra participated in the recording, with David Bedford supplying the arrangements.

The 'duffle coat' on the album's credits was used by Andrew Latimer and Doug Ferguson on "Epitaph" to simulate a flapping of wings by waving it in the air.

The album was released in late April 1975, eventually reaching number 22 in UK album chart that summer. It spent 13 weeks on chart and was certified silver. In the US, the album was released in July and reached No. 162. It was critically successful and sold well in Europe and Japan and in 2014 was voted no. 31 in the Top 100 Prog Albums of All Time by readers of Prog magazine.

=== 2013 version ===
Album cover of 2013 re-recording

The Snow Goose was re-recorded in May 2013 and released that November (dropping the "Music Inspired By" from the title) as a tribute to the original line-up by founder Andrew Latimer, remaining close to the original arrangement.

== Live performances ==
The album's success led to a sell-out concert at the Royal Albert Hall, London, with the London Symphony Orchestra in October 1975, which was later released as part of the live double album A Live Record (1978). The Melody Maker magazine to declare Camel to be Britain's "Brightest Hope", leading to an appearance on BBC's The Old Grey Whistle Test on 21 June 1975, (where the band performed with a woodwind section a medley of "Snow Goose" themes) and Radio One In Concert programme (22 April 1975). To promote the album Decca decided to release an edited version of "Flight of the Snow Goose/Rhayader" as a single in May.

Camel embarked on a brief tour in autumn 2013, performing The Snow Goose for the first time since the Royal Albert Hall show in 1975. Andrew Latimer was joined by Colin Bass, Denis Clement, Guy LeBlanc and Jason Hart for the tour, which marked the first time the band had played since their farewell tour.

A statement from the band for the initial show said: "The evening pays tribute to former band member Peter Bardens, who died of cancer at the same time as frontman Latimer was battling a terminal illness. Ten years later, Latimer has regained health and is willing to celebrate a career that spans over four decades. This two-set show will also embrace compositions recorded throughout those years in a personal covenant of appreciation for a deeply rewarding life of music."

== Track listing ==
All songs by Peter Bardens and Andrew Latimer.

Side one
No.	Title	Length
1.	"The Great Marsh"	2:02
2.	"Rhayader"	3:01
3.	"Rhayader Goes to Town"	5:19
4.	"Sanctuary"	1:05
5.	"Fritha"	1:19
6.	"The Snow Goose"	3:11
7.	"Friendship"	1:43
8.	"Migration"	2:01
9.	"Rhayader Alone"	1:50

Side two
No.	Title	Length
10.	"Flight of the Snow Goose"	2:40
11.	"Preparation"	3:58
12.	"Dunkirk"	5:19
13.	"Epitaph"	2:07
14.	"Fritha Alone"	1:40
15.	"La Princesse Perdue"	4:43
16.	"The Great Marsh"	1:20

Bonus tracks on 2002 remaster
No.	Title	Length
17.	"Flight of the Snow Goose" (Single edit)	2:05
18.	"Rhayader" (Single edit)	3:09
19.	"Flight of the Snow Goose" (Alternate single edit)	2:50
20.	"Rhayader Goes to Town" (Recorded live at The Marquee Club)	5:07
21.	"The Snow Goose/Freefall" (Recorded live at The Marquee Club)	11:01

Bonus disc on 2009 Japanese remaster

Tracks 1–11 recorded live from 1975 BBC Radio One concert (Golders Green Hippodrome, London – 22 April 1975)

No.	Title	Length
1.	"Rhayader Goes to Town"	5:08
2.	"Sanctuary"	1:13
3.	"The Snow Goose"	3:03
4.	"Migration"	3:32
5.	"Rhayader Alone"	1:43
6.	"Flight of the Snow Goose"	2:56
7.	"Preparation"	2:05
8.	"Dunkirk"	5:11
9.	"Epitaph"	1:17
10.	"La Princesse Perdue"	4:40
11.	"The Great Marsh"	2:00
12.	"Selections from The Snow Goose (BBC 2 The Old Grey Whistle Test – 21 June 1975)"	9:40

Re-recorded 2013 edition

No.	Title	Length
1.	"The Great Marsh"	2:03
2.	"Rhayader"	3:06
3.	"Rhayader Goes to Town"	5:27
4.	"Sanctuary"	2:56
5.	"Fritha"	1:27
6.	"The Snow Goose"	3:01
7.	"Friendship"	1:49
8.	"Migration"	4:29
9.	"Rhayader Alone"	3:23
10.	"Flight of the Snow Goose"	2:26
11.	"Preparation"	3:53
12.	"Dunkirk"	5:38
13.	"Epitaph"	1:32
14.	"Fritha Alone"	1:46
15.	"La princesse perdue"	5:17
16.	"The Great Marsh" (Reprise)	1:31

== Personnel ==
Camel

- Andrew Latimer – electric, acoustic and slide guitars, flute, vocals (track 8)
- Peter Bardens – organ, electric piano, acoustic piano, pipe organ, Minimoog, ARP Odyssey
- Doug Ferguson – bass, duffle coat
- Andy Ward – drums, vibes, percussion

Production

- David Bedford – orchestral arrangements
- Rhett Davies – recording engineer
- Modula – sleeve design

== Release details ==
- 1975, UK, Decca Records SKL-R 5207 Release Date April 1975, LP
- 2002, UK, London 8829292, Release Date 3 June 2002, CD (remastered edition)
- 2009, Japan, Universal, UICY-94132/3, 27 May 2009, 2CD (SHM)
- 2013, UK, Camel Productions, CP0014CD, 4 Nov 2013, CD
- 2025, UK, Esoteric Recordings, Release Date 2025, Box Set 2 x CD, 1 x Blu-ray

== Charts ==
Chart (1975)	Peak position
UK Albums (Official Charts)	22
US Billboard 200	162

== Certifications ==
Region	Certification	Certified units/sales
United Kingdom (BPI)	Silver	60,000^{^}
^{^} Shipments figures based on certification alone.
