= Andy Ward (musician) =

British drummer

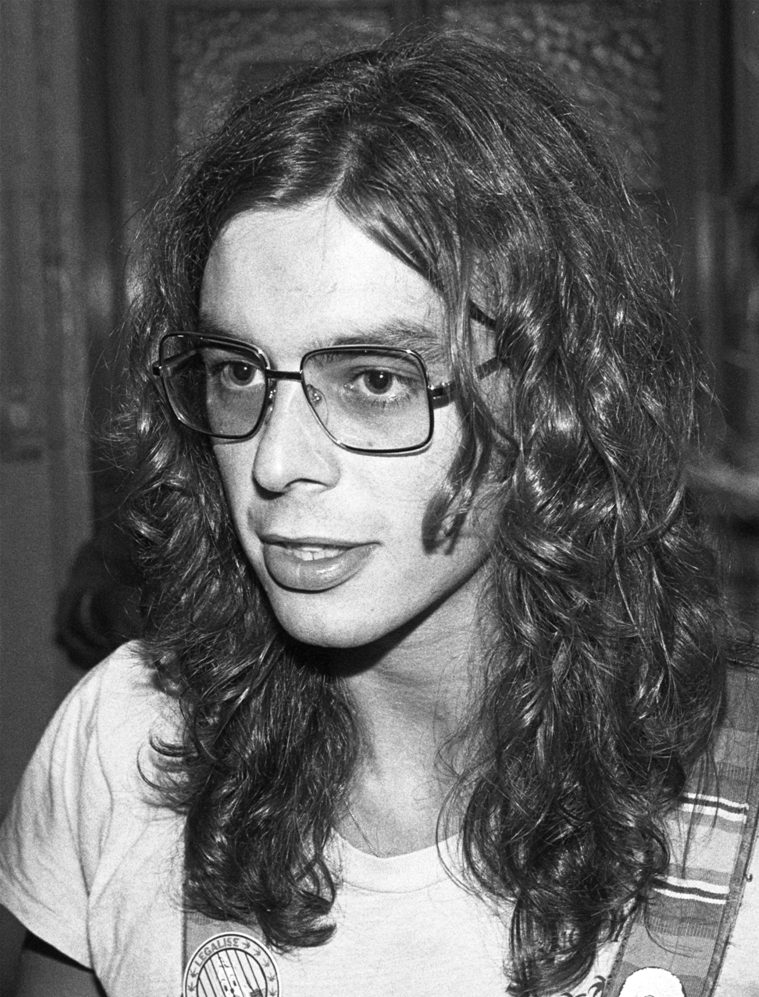
- Ward in 1977

Background information
- Born: Andrew John Ward; 28 September 1952 (age 73); Epsom, Surrey, England
- Genres: Progressive rock; Canterbury scene; neo-prog
- Occupation: Drummer
- Formerly of: Camel; The Bevis Frond; Mirage; Marillion; The Chrysanthemums
- Website: andywardmusic.com

Andrew John Ward (born 28 September 1952) is an English progressive rock drummer.

== Early life ==
Born in Epsom, England, Ward attended the City of London Freemen's School. He began drumming at the age of 13 in a local rock band with Jim Butt (guitar), Doug Houston (vocals), Colin Burgess (bass) and Jan (Murray) Obodynski (keyboards).

== Career ==
=== Camel (1971–1981) ===
Ward became a founding member of the progressive rock band Camel in 1971, evolving from Ward's first band, the Brew. One of the leading lights of the English progressive rock movement, Camel enjoyed considerable success worldwide, peaking in 1975 when they performed their album The Snow Goose at the Royal Albert Hall, accompanied by the London Symphony Orchestra. Following a period of ill health – including problems caused by alcohol and drugs – in 1981 he was forced to retire from the band. With Ward's departure, Andrew Latimer became the only original member who remained in the band.

=== Marillion (1983) ===
Two years later, he resurfaced briefly with the neo-prog band Marillion, appearing in the video of the hit single "Garden Party" from their debut album Script for a Jester's Tear and performing with them for three months as a replacement for their original drummer, Mick Pointer, who had recently been sacked. Ward's performances with the band included an appearance on the BBC's The Old Grey Whistle Test when they performed "Forgotten Sons". According to Mark Kelly, Ward had been recruited to the band without a proper audition because of his reputation. However, as both Kelly and Fish have recalled, his personal problems had resurfaced and he succumbed to a nervous breakdown midway through the band's first American tour.

=== Canterbury (1987–2002) ===
Throughout the 1990s, Ward worked with Richard Sinclair's Caravan of Dreams and Going Going, with Sinclair, Hugh Hopper, Vince Clarke and Mark Hewins. In 1994, he joined Mirage – a progressive "supergroup" combining members from both Camel and Caravan. His other projects included the studio-only group the Chrysanthemums, led by singer-songwriter Yukio Yung (aka Terry Burrows), who received drum tracks through the post from Ward before building songs around them, playing all the other instruments himself. At this time Ward also became full-time drummer with the English rock band the Bevis Frond, with whom he recorded and toured extensively.

=== Early 2000’s ===
In 2002, a compilation CD, Sticking Around, was released. This compilation highlights his work with Camel and other projects.

In 2003, Ward participated in a short lived reformation of the original members of the Brew (with Latimer and Ferguson) and recorded material for an album that never materialized, largely due to Latimer's ongoing health issues.

== Discography ==
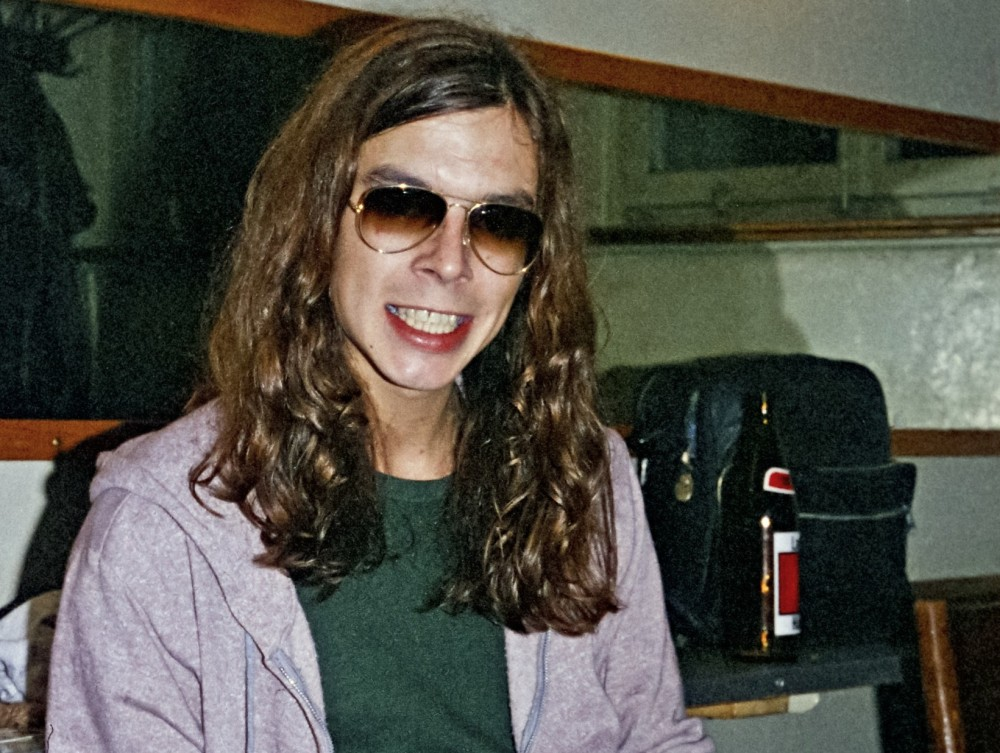
Ward in 1975

=== Albums with Camel ===
- Camel (1973)
- Mirage (1974)
- The Snow Goose (1975)
- Moonmadness (1976)
- Rain Dances (1977)
- Breathless (1978)
- I Can See Your House from Here (1979)
- Nude (1981)

=== Studio albums ===
- 1971 Phil Goodhand Tait I Think I'll Write a Song
- 1985 Adrian Shaw Tea for the Hydra
- 1987 Stan Campbell Stan Campbell
- 1988 Skaboosh Freetown
- 1991 Todd Dillingham Wilde Canterbury Dream
- 1993 Todo Dillingham Vastrmpty Spaces
- 1994 Bevis Frond Sprawl
- 1995 Bevis Frond Superseeder
- 1995 Yukio Yung Goodbye Pork Pie Brain
- 1995 Yukio Yung Hello Pulsing Vein
- 1996 Yukio Yung Mostly Water
- 1996 Richard Sinclair Caravan of Dreams
- 1997 Richard Sinclair RSVP
- 1997 The Deviants Have Left the Planet
- 1998 Bevis Frond Valedictory Songs
- 1999 The Chrysanthemums The Baby's Head
- 1999 Steve Adams Vertigo
- 2002 Bevis Frond What Did for the Dinosaurs
- 2002 Anton Barbeau King of Missouri
- 2003 Hugh Hopper In a Dubious Manner
- 2003 Andy Ward Sticking Around
