= Moonmadness =

Studio album by Camel
- Released: 26 March 1976
- Recorded: January–February 1976
- Studio: Basing Street, London
- Genre: Progressive rock
- Length: 39:12
- Label: Decca; Gama
- Producer: Rhett Davies; Camel

Camel chronology
The Snow Goose (1975)	Moonmadness (1976)	Rain Dances (1977)

Singles from Moonmadness
- 1. "Another Night" Released: 25 June 1976

Professional ratings
Review scores
Source	Rating
AllMusic	3/5 stars

Moonmadness is the fourth studio album by English progressive rock band Camel. It was released in March 1976 on Decca and Gama Records and is their last album recorded by the group's original line-up of Andrew Latimer, Peter Bardens, Doug Ferguson, and Andy Ward. After reaching success with their previous album, the all-instrumental The Snow Goose, the band started on a follow-up and incorporated vocals and lyrics to the new music. Moonmadness has a loose concept with one track based on the personality of each band member: "Air Born" for Andrew Latimer, "Chord Change" for Peter Bardens, "Another Night" for Doug Ferguson, and "Lunar Sea" for Andy Ward. In 2018, 42 years after its release, Camel performed the album live in its entirety.

== Background ==
Camel's popularity grew in 1975 with their critically acclaimed instrumental album The Snow Goose, which was followed by the group being voted Britain's Brightest Hope by readers of the nationwide music publication Melody Maker. In late 1975, the band spent three weeks writing new music for a follow-up album, and recorded Moonmadness in January and February 1976. At the time of release, Latimer said he was very pleased with the album despite the need to rush to finish it.

The last track, "Lunar Sea", ends with a minute-long wind-blowing effect. On some LP pressings, the record arm would skip during the end of this part and naturally return to the beginning of the effect, playing it endlessly (the "terminal groove" effect).

In the Q & Mojo Classic Special Edition Pink Floyd & The Story of Prog Rock, the album came number 23 in its list of "40 Cosmic Rock Albums".

It was voted no. 58 in the Top 100 Prog albums of All Time by readers of 'Prog' magazine in 2014 and is ranked 16th greatest prog album on progarchives.com (as of 23-07-2025).

Camel performed the album in its entirety on a 2018 tour.

== Track listing ==
Side one
No.	Title	Writer(s)	Length
1.	"Aristillus" (instrumental; spoken voice by Andy Ward)	Andrew Latimer	1:56
2.	"Song Within a Song"	Latimer, Peter Bardens	7:16
3.	"Chord Change" (instrumental)	Latimer, Bardens	6:45
4.	"Spirit of the Water"	Bardens	2:07

Side two
No.	Title	Writer(s)	Length
1.	"Another Night"	Latimer, Bardens, Andy Ward, Doug Ferguson	6:58
2.	"Air Born"	Latimer, Bardens	5:02
3.	"Lunar Sea" (instrumental)	Latimer, Bardens	9:11

Bonus tracks on 2002 remaster
No.	Title	Length
8.	"Another Night" (Single version)	3:22
9.	"Spirit of the Water" (Demo)	2:13
10.	"Song Within a Song" (Recorded live at Hammersmith Odeon 14 April 1976)	7:11
11.	"Lunar Sea" (Recorded live at Hammersmith Odeon 14 April 1976)	9:51
12.	"Preparation/Dunkirk" (Recorded live at Hammersmith Odeon 14 April 1976)	9:32

Bonus tracks on 2009 Deluxe Edition (disc one)
No.	Title	Length
8.	"Another Night" (Single version)	3:22
9.	"Spirit of the Water" (Demo)	2:13
10.	"Lunar Sea" (Recorded live at Hammersmith Odeon 14 April 1976)	9:51

Bonus tracks on 2009 Deluxe Edition (disc two)
No.	Title	Length
1.	"Song Within a Song" (Recorded live at Hammersmith Odeon 14 April 1976)	7:13
2.	"Excerpts from The Snow Goose" (Recorded live at Hammersmith Odeon 14 April 1976)	10:41
3.	"Air Born" (Recorded live at Hammersmith Odeon 14 April 1976)	4:58
4.	"Chord Change" (Recorded live at Hammersmith Odeon 14 April 1976)	6:49
5.	"The White Rider" (Recorded live at Hammersmith Odeon 14 April 1976)	8:51
6.	"Preparation/Dunkirk" (Recorded live at Hammersmith Odeon 14 April 1976)	9:32
7.	"Another Night" (Recorded live at Hammersmith Odeon 14 April 1976)	6:27
8.	"Lady Fantasy" (Recorded live at Hammersmith Odeon 14 April 1976)	16:05

== Personnel ==
Camel

- Andrew Latimer – guitars, flute; vocals (5, 6)
- Peter Bardens – keyboards; vocals (4)
- Doug Ferguson – bass; vocals (2)
- Andy Ward – drums, percussion; voice (1)

Production

- Engineered by Rhett Davies
- Original LP cover design by John Field

== Release details ==
- 1976, UK, Gama Records/Decca Records TXS-R 115, Release Date March 1976, LP
- 2002, UK, London 8829292, Release Date 3 June 2002, CD (remastered edition)
- 2009, Germany, Decca 5316287, Release Date 25 February 2009, CD (deluxe edition)
- 2025, UK, Esoteric Recordings, Release Date 2025, Box Set 2 x CD 1 x Blu Ray

== Charts ==
Chart (1976)	Peak position
Dutch Albums (Album Top 100)	16
Spanish Albums (AFYVE)	21
Swedish Albums (Sverigetopplistan)	48
UK Albums (OCC)	15
US Billboard 200	118

Chart (2025)	Peak position
Greek Albums (IFPI)	16

== Certifications ==
Region	Certification	Certified units/sales
United Kingdom (BPI)	Silver	60,000^{^}
^{^} Shipments figures based on certification alone.
