= Dust and Dreams =

Studio album by Camel
- Released: 10 September 1991
- Genre: Progressive rock
- Length: 47:57
- Label: Camel Productions
- Producer: Andrew Latimer

Camel chronology
Stationary Traveller (1984)	Dust and Dreams (1991)	Harbour of Tears (1996)

Professional ratings
Review scores
Source	Rating
Allmusic	3/5 stars

Dust and Dreams is the eleventh studio album by Camel. Released in 1991 after a seven-year hiatus during which Andrew Latimer and Susan Hoover moved from England to California to set up their own Camel Productions label, the album was inspired by John Steinbeck's The Grapes of Wrath.

== Track listings ==
All songs were written by Andrew Latimer, except where noted.

No.	Title	Writer(s)	Length
1.	"Dust Bowl"		1:54
2.	"Go West"		3:42
3.	"Dusted Out"		1:35
4.	"Mother Road"		4:15
5.	"Needles"		2:34
6.	"Rose of Sharon"	Susan Hoover, Latimer	4:48
7.	"Milk n' Honey"		3:30
8.	"End of the Line"	Hoover, Latimer	6:52
9.	"Storm Clouds"		2:06
10.	"Cotton Camp"		2:55
11.	"Broken Banks"		0:34
12.	"Sheet Rain"		2:14
13.	"Whispers"		0:52
14.	"Little Rivers and Little Rose"		1:56
15.	"Hopeless Anger"		4:57
16.	"Whispers in the Rain"		2:56

== Personnel ==
- Andy Latimer – Guitar, Flute, Keyboards, Vocals, Producer, Engineer
- Colin Bass – Bass
- Ton Scherpenzeel – Keyboards
- Paul Burgess – Drums

=== Additional musicians ===
- Don Harriss – Keyboards
- Christopher Bock – Drums
- Kim Venaas – Harmonica (5,7,12), Timpani (16)
- David Paton – Vocal (6)
- Mae McKenna – Vocal (6)
- John Burton – French Horn (12)
- James SK Wān – bamboo flute
- Neil Panton – Oboe (13)

=== Other credits ===
- Produced & engineered by Andy Latimer
- Mixed by Bruce Lampcov at Air Studios, London
- Artwork by Arthur Rothstein
- Insert layout: Emily Mura-Smith

== Charts ==
Chart (1991)	Peak position
Dutch Albums (Album Top 100)	39
