= Breathless (Camel album) =

Studio album by Camel
- Released: 22 September 1978
- Recorded: 1978
- Studios: The Manor, Chipping Norton, Threshold, England
- Genres: Progressive rock; pop; jazz; classical music
- Length: 44:56
- Labels: Gama, Decca, Arista
- Producers: Camel, Mick Glossop

Camel chronology
Rain Dances (1977)	Breathless (1978)	I Can See Your House from Here (1979)

Singles from Breathless
- 1. "Breathless" Released: December 1978 (Japan)

Breathless is the sixth album by the English progressive rock band Camel, released in 1978. It is the last album to feature the group's original keyboardist, Peter Bardens, who left the group before the tour for the album.

The album focuses on shorter, radio-friendly pop songs while retaining their progressive rock sound.

== Critical reception ==
Professional ratings
Review scores
Source	Rating
AllMusic	4.5/5 stars
MusicHound Rock: The Essential Album Guide	2.5/5 stars
Shreveport Journal	B+

The Shreveport Journal deemed the album "a blend of classical, jazz, and Moody Blues–type rock."

== Track listing ==
Side one
No.	Title	Writer(s)	Length
1.	"Breathless"	Andrew Latimer, Peter Bardens, Andy Ward	4:21
2.	"Echoes"	Latimer, Bardens, Ward	7:21
3.	"Wing and a Prayer"	Latimer, Bardens	4:46
4.	"Down on the Farm"	Richard Sinclair	4:25
5.	"Starlight Ride"	Latimer, Bardens	3:26

Side two
No.	Title	Writer(s)	Length
1.	"Summer Lightning"	Latimer, Sinclair	6:10
2.	"You Make Me Smile"	Latimer, Bardens	4:18
3.	"The Sleeper"	Latimer, Bardens, Ward, Mel Collins	7:08
4.	"Rainbow's End"	Latimer, Bardens	3:01

2009 Expanded & Remastered Edition
No.	Title	Writer(s)	Length
10.	"Rainbow's End" (Single version)	Latimer, Bardens	2:59

== Personnel ==
Camel

- Andrew Latimer – guitar, Yamaha CS-50 & CS-80 synthesizers; vocals on "Echoes", "Starlight Ride", "You Make Me Smile" and "Rainbow's End"
- Peter Bardens – keyboards, organ; vocals on "Wing and a Prayer"
- Richard Sinclair – bass; Lead vocals on "Breathless", "Down on the Farm" and "Summer Lightning"
- Andy Ward – drums, percussion
- Mel Collins – flute, oboe, saxophones

Additional personnel

- Dave Sinclair – synthesizer on "You Make Me Smile", piano on "Rainbow's End"
- Jan Schelhaas – clavinet on "You Make Me Smile"

Production

- Engineered by Mick Glossop
- Artwork by Michael Munday & CREAM

== Charts ==
Chart (1978)	Peak position
German Albums (Offizielle Top 100)	40
Spanish Albums (AFYVE)	26
UK Albums (Official Charts)	26
US Billboard 200	134
