= Harbour of Tears =

Studio album by Camel
- Released: 5 February 1996
- Recorded: 1994–1995
- Genre: Progressive rock
- Length: 62:14
- Label: Camel Productions
- Producer: Andy Latimer

Camel chronology
Dust and Dreams (1991)	Harbour of Tears (1996)	Rajaz (1999)

Professional ratings
Review scores
Source	Rating
Allmusic	4.0/5 stars

Harbour of Tears is the twelfth studio album by English progressive rock band Camel, released in 1996. It is a concept album, telling the story of an Irish family who are painfully separated as their young ones depart to the United States to seek a better future.

== Title and lyrics ==
Band vocalist and guitarist Andrew Latimer learned that the last sight of Ireland his grandmother's family would have seen was Cóbh Harbour, a deep-water port that witnessed the fracturing of thousands of families as their sons and daughters departed towards America. Thus the album was titled as the common alias of the port, 'Harbour of Tears'.

== Track listing ==
No.	Title	Writer(s)	Length
1.	"Irish Air (Traditional Gaelic)"	Andy Latimer, Susan Hoover	0:57
2.	"Irish Air (Instrumental Reprise)"	Latimer	1:57
3.	"Harbour of Tears"	Latimer, Hoover	3:13
4.	"Cóbh"	Latimer	0:51
5.	"Send Home the Slates"	Latimer, Hoover	4:23
6.	"Under the Moon"	Latimer	1:16
7.	"Watching the Bobbins"	Latimer, Hoover	7:14
8.	"Generations"	Latimer	1:02
9.	"Eyes of Ireland"	Latimer, Hoover	3:09
10.	"Running from Paradise"	Latimer	5:21
11.	"End of the Day"	Latimer, Hoover	2:29
12.	"Coming of Age"	Latimer	7:22
13.	"The Hour Candle (A Song for My Father)" ( (Note: Song ends at 6:30, afterwards a hidden track begins; after 8:03 the hidden track shifts into low-volume sea wave sounds until 23:00.))	Latimer	23:00

== Personnel ==
- Andy Latimer – Guitars, Flute, Keyboards, Vocals, Penny Whistle
- Colin Bass – Bass guitar, backing vocals
- Mickey Simmonds – Keyboards

=== Additional musicians ===
- John Xepoleas – Drums
- David Paton – Bass, lead vocals on "Send Home the Slates"
- Mae McKenna – A Capella vocal on "Irish Air"
- Neil Panton – Oboe, Soprano sax, Harmonium
- Barry Phillips – Cello
- John Burton – French horn
- James SK Wān – Bamboo flute
- Karen Bentley – Violin
- Anita Stoneham – Violin

=== Other credits ===
- Mixed by Andy Latimer and Colin Bass
- Sleeve design by Jon Storey

== Charts ==
Chart (1996)	Peak position
Dutch Albums (Album Top 100)	58
