= Stationary Traveller =

Studio album by Camel
- Released: 13 April 1984
- Studio: Riverside Studios (England)
- Genre: Progressive rock
- Length: 40:45 (original); 48:36 (2004 re-release)
- Label: Decca
- Producer: Andy Latimer

Camel chronology
| The Single Factor (1982) | Stationary Traveller (1984) | Dust and Dreams (1991) |

Singles from Stationary Traveller
- 1. "Cloak and Dagger Man" Released: March 1984

Professional ratings
Review scores
| Source | Rating |
|---|---|
| Allmusic | 3/5 stars |

Stationary Traveller is the tenth studio album by English progressive rock band Camel. Like much of Camel's output, it is a concept album, in this case centering on the trials of East German refugees attempting to cross the Berlin Wall from East Berlin into West Berlin. The album also touches on the theme of politics between the two different government ideologies. It is the last Camel album to be recorded on the Decca label.

The album was recorded at Riverside Studios, England. It was mixed in Los Angeles, California and mastered at The Mastering Lab, Los Angeles.

== Track listings ==
=== Original release (1984) ===
All tracks are written by Andrew Latimer and Susan Hoover, except where noted.

Side one
| No. | Title | Writer(s) | Notes | Length |
|---|---|---|---|---|
| 1. | "Pressure Points" (instrumental) | Andrew Latimer | Personnel: Haydn Bendall - Fairlight synthesizer, mixing; Andy Latimer - all the other instruments, mixing | 2:11 |
| 2. | "Refugee" | | Personnel: Andy Latimer - guitar, lead vocals, electric piano, bass; Ton Scherpenzeel - accordion, Prophet synthesizer; Paul Burgess - drums | 3:37 |
| 3. | "Vopos" | | Personnel: Andy Latimer - guitar, lead vocals, piano, PPG, Juno 60 and Yamaha CS-80 synthesizers, Drumulator; Haydn Bendall - Fairlight synthesizer; Ton Scherpenzeel - Yamaha CS-80 and Prophet synthesizers; David Paton - bass | 5:22 |
| 4. | "Cloak and Dagger Man" | | Personnel: Andy Latimer - electric and 12-string guitars; Chris Rainbow - lead vocals; Ton Scherpenzeel - Prophet and Juno 60 synthesizers; David Paton - bass; Paul Burgess - drums | 3:42 |
| 5. | "Stationary Traveller" (instrumental) | Latimer | Personnel: Andy Latimer - electric and classical guitars, pan pipes, bass; Ton Scherpenzeel - Prophet, PPG and Juno 60 synthesizers, grand piano; Paul Burgess - drums | 5:27 |

Side two
| No. | Title | Writer(s) | Notes | Length |
|---|---|---|---|---|
| 1. | "West Berlin" | | Personnel: Andy Latimer - guitar, lead vocals, bass; Ton Scherpenzeel - Prophet and PPG synthesizers, grand piano; Paul Burgess - drums | 4:58 |
| 2. | "Fingertips" | | Personnel: Andy Latimer - drumulator, lead vocals; Ton Scherpenzeel - Korg and PPG synthesizers, grand piano, organ; David Paton - fretless bass; Mel Collins - saxophone | 4:21 |
| 3. | "Missing" (instrumental) | Latimer | Personnel: Haydn Bendall - PPG voices; Andy Latimer - all the other instruments | 4:04 |
| 4. | "After Words" (instrumental) | Ton Scherpenzeel | Personnel: Ton Scherpenzeel - electric grand piano, accordion, Prophet synthesizer | 1:55 |
| 5. | "Long Goodbyes" | | Personnel: Andy Latimer - guitar, flute; Chris Rainbow - lead vocals; Ton Scherpenzeel - grand piano, Prophet synthesizer; David Paton - fretless bass; Paul Burgess - drums | 5:08 |

=== Camel Productions digital remaster (2004) ===
| No. | Title | Length |
|---|---|---|
| 1. | "In the Arms of Waltzing Frauleins" | 2:18 |
| 2. | "Refugee" | 3:49 |
| 3. | "Vopos" | 5:31 |
| 4. | "Cloak and Dagger Man" | 3:55 |
| 5. | "Stationary Traveller" | 5:35 |
| 6. | "West Berlin" | 5:10 |
| 7. | "Fingertips" | 4:29 |
| 8. | "Missing" | 4:22 |
| 9. | "After Words" | 2:02 |
| 10. | "Long Goodbyes" | 5:17 |
| 11. | "Pressure Points" (bonus track, extended mix) | 6:14 |

=== Cherry Red Records reissue (2009) ===
| No. | Title | Length |
|---|---|---|
| 1. | "Pressure Points" | 2:10 |
| 2. | "Refugee" | 3:49 |
| 3. | "Vopos" | 5:31 |
| 4. | "Cloak and Dagger Man" | 3:55 |
| 5. | "Stationary Traveller" | 5:35 |
| 6. | "West Berlin" | 5:10 |
| 7. | "Fingertips" | 4:29 |
| 8. | "Missing" | 4:22 |
| 9. | "After Words" | 2:02 |
| 10. | "Long Goodbyes" | 5:17 |
| 11. | "In the Arms of Waltzing Frauleins" (bonus track) | 2:17 |
| 12. | "Pressure Points" (bonus track, extended 12" single version) | 6:15 |

== Personnel ==
=== Camel ===
- Andy Latimer – electric, acoustic & 12 string guitars, bass, synthesizers, piano, drum synthesiser, flute, lead vocals
- Ton Scherpenzeel – organ, grand piano, Prophet synthesizer, Yamaha CS-80, Juno 60, Korg, PPG, accordion
- Paul Burgess – drums

=== Additional personnel ===
- David Paton – bass (A 3, 4), fretless bass (B 2, 5), backing vocals
- Chris Rainbow – lead vocals (A 4, B 10)
- Mel Collins – sax (B 2)
- Haydn Bendall – Fairlight synthesizer (A 1, 3), PPG synthesizer (B 3)

== Production and other credits ==
- Engineered by Dave Hutchins
- Mixed by Greg Ladanyi, Haydn Bendall and Andy Latimer
- Artwork by Artifex Studio, London

== Charts ==
| Chart (1984) | Peak position |
|---|---|
| Dutch Albums (Album Top 100) | 16 |
| Spanish Albums (AFYVE) | 33 |
| Swedish Albums (Sverigetopplistan) | 48 |
| UK Albums (OCC) | 57 |
