= Mirage (Camel album) =

Studio album by Camel
- Released: 1 March 1974
- Recorded: November 1973
- Studio: Island Studios, London; Decca Studios, London; AIR Studios, London
- Genre: Progressive rock
- Length: 37:58; 38:08 (2023 Remix)
- Label: Deram; Gama; Janus
- Producer: David Hitchcock

Camel chronology
| Camel (1973) | Mirage (1974) | The Snow Goose (1975) |

Mirage is the second studio album by the English progressive rock band Camel, released on 1 March 1974. The album was released on Gama Records/Deram Records.

== Songs ==
There are five tracks on Mirage, two over 9 minutes. Those two are multi-part songs: "Lady Fantasy" and "Nimrodel/The Procession/The White Rider", the latter being about The Lord of the Rings. "Supertwister" includes a showcase for Andrew Latimer's flute.

== Creation ==
Gama Records was looking for an outlet for their projects and quickly signed a long-term deal with Decca/London branch label, Deram Records. The first fruits of this collaboration was Mirage. For this first installment, the Gama Records label makes a production effort well above that of the first album with MCA. The first step was to have a weight producer like David Hitchcock (Genesis, Caravan), and half a dozen sound engineers including John Burns, Bill Price or Howard Kilgour and distributed between Island Studios, Decca Studios and the Air Studios. Mick Rock shot the inner sleeve photo for the album.

== Critical reception ==
Professional ratings
Review scores
| Source | Rating |
|---|---|
| AllMusic | 3/5 stars |
| Sputnikmusic | 5/5 stars |

There was no promo single, nor did it chart in the UK, but the general media response to the finished record was very promising. The prestigious Sounds magazine was one of the first to praise the work and Andy Ward and Doug Ferguson were described as a well-oiled machine. Even further was The Beat Magazine that declared Mirage "Album of the Month", and finally came the surprise when the record entered the Billboard Top 200 at number 149 and remained visible for no less than 13 weeks. Today, Mirage is considered one of the essential Progressive Rock albums of all time, occupying position 21 on the list of the 50 Essential Progressive Rock Albums by Rolling Stone magazine.

In a Sputnikmusic album review, critic Matthijs van der Lee declared Mirage as Camel's "magnum opus". The album was voted no. 51 in the Top 100 Prog albums of All Time by readers of Prog magazine in 2014.

Prog Sphere considered Mirage to be the band's best album, writing that it is a prog classic that should be owned by anyone that is a fan of progressive rock.

=== Release details ===
- 1974, U.S., Janus Records
- 1974, UK, Deram Records SML 1107, Release Date 1 March 1974, LP
- 2002, UK, London 8829292, Release Date 3 June 2002, CD (remastered edition)
- 2023, Deram Records, Release Date 20 October 2023, Digital (2023 Remastered & Expanded Edition)
- 2025, Esoteric Recordings, Release Date 2025, Box Set 2 x CD 1 x Blu- Ray

== Track listing ==
Side one
| No. | Title | Writer(s) | Length |
|---|---|---|---|
| 1. | "Freefall" | Peter Bardens | 5:53 |
| 2. | "Supertwister" (instrumental) | Bardens | 3:22 |
| 3. | "The White Rider" a. "Nimrodel" b. "The Procession" c. "The White Rider" | Andrew Latimer | 9:16: 0:49; 1:03; 7:24 |

Side two
| No. | Title | Writer(s) | Length |
|---|---|---|---|
| 1. | "Earthrise" (instrumental) | Bardens, Latimer | 6:40 |
| 2. | "Lady Fantasy" a. "Encounter" b. "Smiles for You" c. "Lady Fantasy" | Bardens, Latimer, Andy Ward, Doug Ferguson | 12:44: 3:47; 1:25; 7:32 |

Bonus tracks on 2002 remaster
| No. | Title | Length |
|---|---|---|
| 6. | "Supertwister" (Recorded Live at The Marquee Club - 30 October 1974) | 3:14 |
| 7. | "Mystic Queen" (Recorded Live at The Marquee Club - 30 October 1974) | 6:09 |
| 8. | "Arubaluba" (Recorded Live at The Marquee Club - 30 October 1974) | 7:44 |
| 9. | "Lady Fantasy: Encounter/Smiles for You/Lady Fantasy" (Original Basing Street Studios Mix - November 1973) | 12:59 |

== Personnel ==
Camel

- Andrew Latimer – guitars, flute; vocals on "The White Rider" and "Lady Fantasy"
- Peter Bardens – organ, piano, Minimoog, Mellotron, Fender electric piano, Hohner clavinet, celesta; vocals on "Freefall" and "Lady Fantasy"
- Doug Ferguson – bass
- Andy Ward – drums, percussion

Production

- Produced by David Hitchcock
- Engineered by Howard Kilgour and Bill Price

== Charts ==
| Chart (1974) | Peak position |
|---|---|
| US Billboard 200 | 149 |

| Chart (2024) | Peak position |
|---|---|
| UK Progressive Albums (Official Charts) | 11 |
