= Rain Dances =

Studio album by Camel
- Released: 26 August 1977
- Recorded: February–August 1977
- Studios: Basing Street Studios, London
- Genres: Progressive rock; jazz rock
- Length: 41:28
- Label: Gama/Decca
- Producers: Rhett Davies, Camel

Camel chronology
Moonmadness (1976)	Rain Dances (1977)	Breathless (1978)

Singles from Rain Dances
- 1. "Highways of the Sun" Released: 30 September 1977

Professional ratings
Review scores
Source	Rating
AllMusic	4.5/5 stars
ProgroGraphy review	

Rain Dances is the fifth studio album by English progressive rock band Camel. It was released in August 1977 on Gama Records/Decca Records, and brought a major change to the band's line-up, by replacing bassist Doug Ferguson with ex-Caravan member Richard Sinclair, and by adding saxophonist Mel Collins, formerly of King Crimson. Guest musicians include Brian Eno on one song.

== Track listing ==
All tracks are written by Peter Bardens and Andrew Latimer except where noted.

Side one
No.	Title	Notes	Length
1.	"First Light" (instrumental)	Personnel: Andrew Latimer – 6- and 12-string guitars, pan pipes; Mel Collins – alto saxophone; Pete Bardens – Minimoog, string synthesizer; Richard Sinclair – bass; Andy Ward – drums, ocarina, teeth, cheek, Turkish ring	4:59
2.	"Metrognome"	Personnel: Andrew Latimer – guitar; Mel Collins – tenor saxophone; Pete Bardens – electric piano, organ, string synthesizer; Richard Sinclair – bass, lead vocals; Andy Ward – drums, percussion, money	4:07
3.	"Tell Me"	Personnel: Andrew Latimer – fretless bass, backing vocals, flute; Mel Collins – soprano and bass clarinets; Pete Bardens – electric piano, Minimoog; Richard Sinclair – lead and harmony vocals; Andy Ward – finger cymbals, glockenspiel	4:04
4.	"Highways of the Sun"	Personnel: Andrew Latimer – acoustic guitar, lead vocals; Mel Collins – soprano and bass flutes; Pete Bardens – acoustic and electric pianos, organ, Minimoog, string synthesizer; Richard Sinclair – bass, wicket keeper; Andy Ward – drums, percussion, liquid Boo Bams	4:25

Side two
No.	Title	Writer(s)	Notes	Length
1.	"Unevensong"	Bardens, Latimer, Andy Ward	Personnel: Andrew Latimer – guitar, second lead vocals; Pete Bardens – electric piano, clavinet, Minimoog, string synthesizers, car horns; Richard Sinclair – bass, first lead vocals; Andy Ward – drums, percussion, Rototoms	5:22
2.	"One of These Days I'll Get an Early Night" (instrumental)	Bardens, Mel Collins, Latimer, Richard Sinclair, Ward	Personnel: Andrew Latimer – guitar; Mel Collins – all saxophones; Pete Bardens – electric piano; Richard Sinclair – bass; Andy Ward– drums, percussion, talking drum, smurd; Martin Drover – trumpet; Malcolm Griffiths – trombone	5:49
3.	"Elke" (instrumental)	Latimer	Personnel: Andrew Latimer – fuzz guitar, acoustic and electric pianos, Minimoog, string synthesizers, flute; Brian Eno – acoustic and electric pianos, Minimoog, bells; Fiona Hibbert – harp	4:20
4.	"Skylines" (instrumental)	Bardens, Latimer, Ward	Personnel: Andrew Latimer – feedback, 6- and 12-string, lead and rhythm guitars, bass, sore fingers; Mel Collins – alto saxophone; Pete Bardens – electric piano, Minimoog, string synthesizers; Andy Ward – drums, Tunisian clay drum, swanee; Martin Drover – flugelhorn; Malcolm Griffiths – trombone	4:17
5.	"Rain Dances" (instrumental)		Personnel: Andrew Latimer – pizzicato guitar, treated piano, glockenspiel, umbrellas; Mel Collins – soprano saxophone, umbrellas; Pete Bardens – Minimoog, string synthesizer, umbrellas	2:47

CD bonus track
No.	Title	Writer(s)	Length
10.	"Highways of the Sun" (Single edit)	Bardens, Latimer	4:01

2009 expanded and remastered edition
No.	Title	Length
10.	"Highways of the Sun" (Single version)	4:00
11.	"First Light" (Live; taken from BBC "Sight and Sound" in Concert - Golders Green Hippodrome, 22 September 1977)	5:01
12.	"Metrognome" (Live; taken from BBC "Sight and Sound" in Concert - Golders Green Hippodrome, 22 September 1977)	4:55
13.	"Unevensong" (Live; taken from BBC "Sight and Sound" in Concert - Golders Green Hippodrome, 22 September 1977)	5:47
14.	"Skylines" (Live; taken from BBC "Sight and Sound" in Concert - Golders Green Hippodrome, 22 September 1977)	5:36
15.	"Highways to the Sun" (Live; taken from BBC "Sight and Sound" in Concert - Golders Green Hippodrome, 22 September 1977)	4:59
16.	"One of These Days I'll Get an Early Night" (Live; taken from BBC "Sight and Sound" in Concert - Golders Green Hippodrome, 22 September 1977)	4:12

== Personnel ==
Camel

- Andrew Latimer – electric guitar, acoustic guitar, 12-string guitar, panpipes, flute, backing vocals; fretless bass on "Tell Me"; electric piano, Minimoog, synthesizer and fuzz guitar on "Elke"; piano on "Elke" and "Rain Dances"; rhythm guitar and bass on "Skylines"; glockenspiel on "Rain Dances"; lead vocals on "Highways of the Sun" and "Unevensong"
- Peter Bardens – organ, piano, electric piano, Minimoog, synthesizer, Hohner Clavinet
- Andy Ward – drums, percussion, ocarina, glockenspiel, talking drum
- Richard Sinclair – bass; lead vocals on "Metrognome", "Tell Me" and "Unevensong"
- Mel Collins – alto saxophone, tenor saxophone, soprano saxophone, clarinet, bass flute, brass arrangements

Additional personnel

- Martin Drover – trumpet on "One of These Days I'll Get an Early Night", flugelhorn on "Skylines"
- Malcolm Griffiths – trombone on "One of These Days I'll Get an Early Night" and "Skylines"
- Brian Eno – Minimoog, electric piano, piano on "Elke"
- Fiona Hibbert – harp on "Elke"

Production

- Rhett Davies – producer
- Dave Hutchins – engineer
- Paul Henry – sleeve design
- Bob Searles – illustration

== Release details ==
- 1977, UK, Gama/Decca, Release date: September 1977, LP
- 1991, UK/GER, Deram, Release date: 26 August, CD (w. bonus track)
- 2004, UK, London 8207252, Release date: 2 February 2004, CD (remastered version)

== Charts ==
Chart (1977)	Peak position
Finnish Albums (The Official Finnish Charts)	29
German Albums (Offizielle Top 100)	49
Norwegian Albums (VG-lista)	17
Spanish Albums (AFYVE)	18
Swedish Albums (Sverigetopplistan)	30
UK Albums (Official Charts)	20
US Billboard 200	136

Chart (2025)	Peak position
Greek Albums (IFPI)	95
