= Andrew Latimer =

English musician (born 1949)

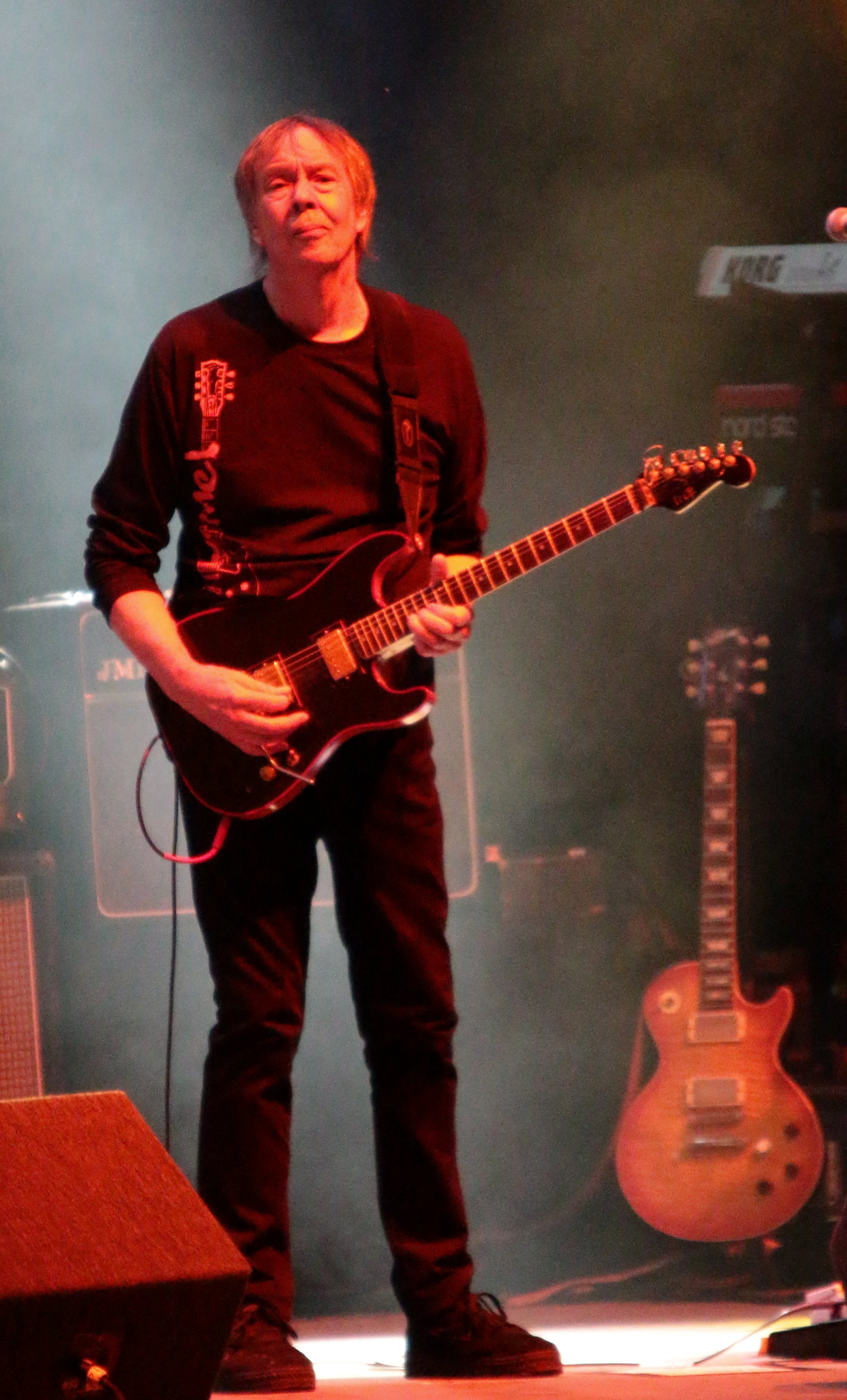
- Latimer in 2015

Background information
- Born: Andrew Gordon Latimer; 17 May 1949 (age 77); Guildford, Surrey, England
- Genre: Progressive rock
- Occupations: Musician; singer; songwriter
- Instruments: Guitar; vocals; flute; keyboards
- Years active: 1964–present
- Labels: MCA; Camel; Decca
- Website: camelproductions.com

Andrew Latimer (born 17 May 1949) is an English musician and composer. He is a founding member of the progressive rock band Camel and the only member who has been with them since their formation in 1971. Although he is best known as a guitarist and singer, Latimer is also a flautist and keyboardist.

== Career ==
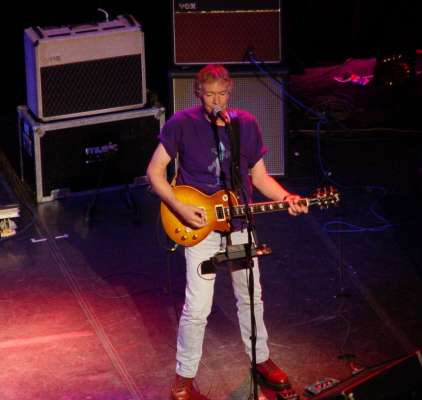
Latimer, 2003

Along with partner Susan Hoover, Latimer relocated to America where they established a music production company named Camel Productions to release Camel's new studio albums: Dust and Dreams (1991), Harbour of Tears (1996), Rajaz (1999) and A Nod and a Wink (2002) as well as a host of "Official Bootlegs" on CD. The band went on the road in 1992, 1997, 2000, 2001, and 2003. They released their first full concert DVD in 1997 titled Coming of Age which began a series of subsequent DVD releases. In mid-2006, Latimer and Hoover returned to the UK and established Camel Productions UK Ltd.

In May 2007, Hoover announced through the Camel Productions website and newsletter that Latimer had suffered from a progressive blood disorder polycythaemia vera since 1992, which had unexpectedly progressed to myelofibrosis. In November 2007, he underwent a successful bone marrow transplant and began a long road to full recovery.

In October 2013, Latimer took Camel back to centre stage. To celebrate the occasion, Camel played live The Snow Goose in its entirety for the first set and dedicated it to the co-founding band members Andy Ward, Peter Bardens (deceased) and Doug Ferguson. Additionally, Camel had re-recorded the album earlier in the year. The re-recording remains faithful to the original, but includes some minor rearrangements and some extended sections. A live DVD, titled In From the Cold, was recorded at the Barbican Centre in London. The Snow Goose tour had been a complete sellout and the band was asked to continue in early 2014. However, the second half of the tour featured Ton Scherpenzeel (Kayak) as keyboardist Guy LeBlanc had become seriously ill, subsequently dying on 27 April 2015.

Despite being troubled by arthritis in his hands and knees, Latimer took Camel back on the road in 2015. In 2016 they toured Japan with new keyboardist Pete Jones and in 2018 Camel toured extensively featuring their most popular recording 1976 Moonmadness. The 2018 tour culminated with the band's return to The Royal Albert Hall to a sellout crowd. The performance was video recorded for anticipated release on DVD and Blu-Ray.

== Equipment ==
Latimer's preferred guitar is a Gibson Les Paul, but he is also known for playing Fender Stratocasters and other guitars. From the 1990s onward, he also played a Burny Super Grade, a 1980s copy of the Gibson Les Paul Model. The amplifiers he uses include Fender, Vox and Marshall.

== Legacy ==
Progressive rock guitarists such as Steve Rothery (Marillion), Mikael Åkerfeldt (Opeth), Bryan Josh (Mostly Autumn) and Bruce Soord (The Pineapple Thief) cite Latimer as one of their primary influences. Musician and producer Steven Wilson of Porcupine Tree is a known fan of Camel and has stated, "Andy Latimer means very much for me."

Latimer received a Lifetime Achievement award at the 2014 Progressive Music Awards.

== Discography ==
Studio albums with Camel

- Camel (1973)
- Mirage (1974)
- The Snow Goose (1975)
- Moonmadness (1976)
- Rain Dances (1977)
- Breathless (1978)
- I Can See Your House from Here (1979)
- Nude (1981)
- The Single Factor (1982)
- Stationary Traveller (1984)
- Dust and Dreams (1991)
- Harbour of Tears (1996)
- Rajaz (1999)
- A Nod and a Wink (2002)
- The Snow Goose (2013)

Solo albums

- War Stories (2025)

Collaborations with others

- Phillip Goodhand-Tait – I Think I'll Write a Song (1971, guitar)
- Michael Chapman – Savage Amusement (1976, guitar)
- Francis Monkman – Dweller on the Threshold (1981, lead guitar)
- Annabel Etkind – A New Romance (1983, piano)
- Annabel Etkind – Memory (1983, electric piano)
- Colin Bass – An Outcast of the Islands (1998, lead guitar, acoustic guitar, e-bow [guitars])
- David Minasian – Random Acts of Beauty (2010, guitar, vocals on track 1)
- Nathan Mahl – Justify (2014, guitar [solo], keyboards [extra] on track 7)
- Colin Bass – At Wild End (2015, guitar, organ, keyboards)
- Jan Schelhaas – Living on a Little Blue Dot (2017, lead guitar)
- The Tangent – Back to the Fender (2018, guitar on tracks: 10 to 13)
- Dave Sinclair – Out of Sinc (2018, electric guitar)
- Kayak – Seventeen (2018, electric guitar, acoustic guitar on tracks: 1–6)
- Tangent – Shadows in the Snow (2020, guitar on track 12)
- Tiger Moth Tales – A Song of Spring (2022, electric guitar on track 8)
- Colin Bass - Daniel Biro – More (2024, guitar, flute)
