= The Reunion (radio series) =

BBC radio discussion series about historic events in modern history

- Genre: Factual
- Running time: 41 minutes
- Country of origin: United Kingdom
- Language: English
- Home station: BBC Radio 4
- Hosted by: Sue MacGregor (2003–2019); Kirsty Wark (2020–present)
- Produced by: David Prest
- Original release: 27 July 2003 – present
- Opening theme: Franz Liszt - "Canzonetta del Salvator Rosa" from Années de pèlerinage
- Website: The Reunion

The Reunion is a radio discussion series presented by Kirsty Wark which reunites a group of people involved in a moment of modern history. It has been broadcast on BBC Radio 4 since July 2003, with 163 episodes presented by the first presenter, Sue MacGregor.

The series brings together four or five participants, sometimes from opposing sides. The first episode reunited the team behind the world's first IVF baby, Louise Brown. Other examples include Robben Island prisoners in Cape Town, South Africa, representatives from Labour and BBC to discuss the Hutton Inquiry, perpetrators and victims of the Brighton hotel bombing, and maids of honour from the 1953 Coronation. The panel discussion is interspersed with archive audio and narration of the event by the presenter.

== History ==
The format for The Reunion was conceived by the series producer David Prest and is owned by Whistledown Productions, who license the programme to BBC Radio 4. The programme won a gold award for the Best Speech Programme at the 2007 Sony Radio Academy Awards and was also voted radio programme of the year at the 2016 Broadcasting Press Guild Awards. In a Radio Times poll in February 2019, The Reunion was voted the 27th greatest radio programme of all time.

MacGregor announced that the series of 2019 would be her last. Kirsty Wark was appointed as the new presenter in May 2020, and her first episode, bringing together participants in the Black Wednesday exchange rate crash of 1992, was broadcast on 16 August 2020.

The Reunion has inspired two feature films. Made in Dagenham (2010) was based on an episode broadcast in September 2003 featuring the women machinists who went on strike at the Ford factory in Dagenham in 1968. The film's producer Stephen Woolley heard the programme, and his company, Number 9 Films, optioned the script from Whistledown Productions, who became consultants to the film and were credited as Associate Producers. Misbehaviour (2020) was similarly inspired by a particularly tense 2010 edition of the programme that brought together the women's liberation protesters who disrupted the 1970 Miss World competition, with former tournament host Michael Aspel, Mecca employee Peter Jolley, and that year's Miss World, Jennifer Hosten.

== Programmes ==
| No | Broadcast date | Title | Guest | Sourch |
|---|---|---|---|---|
| 1 | 27 July 2003 | First "Test Tube Baby" | John Webster, obstetrician; Muriel Harris, nurse; Naomi Fallows, nurse; Robert Edwards, former IVF pioneer; Martin Johnson, research student | |
| 2 | 3 August 2003 | Chariots of Fire | Ben Cross, actor; Nigel Havers, actor; David Puttnam, actor; Colin Welland, actor | |
| 3 | 10 August 2003 | Concorde | John Cochranem, assistant pilot; John Allen, and chief flight engineer; Tony Benn, former minister for aviation; Raymond Baxter, BBC commentator; Mary Goldring, journalist; Mo Bolton, former Concorde nurse; Christopher Orlebar, pilot; David Learmont, aviation correspondent; Sir David Frost, Concorde's most frequent flier | |
| 4 | 17 August 2003 | Iranian Revolution | Hossein Amirsadeghi, Shah's unofficial spokesman in Tehran; Parviz Radji, former Iranian ambassador to the UK; Alireza Nourizadeh, former editor of Ettela'at; Abdol Majid Majidi, former minister of planning and budget; Mahnaz Afkhami, former minister of special responsibilities for women's issues.; John Simpson, BBC journalist; Ali M. Ansari, historian | |
| 5 | 24 August 2003 | Festival of Britain | Terence Conran, restaurateur; Leonard Manasseh, architect; Robin Day, designer; Lucienne Day, textile designer; Jean Symons, architect; Jonathan Woodham, Professor of Design History at the University of Brighton; Jonathan Glancey, Architecture and Design Editor, Brian Aldiss, Guardian and science fiction writer | |
| 6 | 31 August 2003 | Margaret Thatcher's 1979 election campaign | Adam Butler, former parliamentary private secretary; Michael Dobbs, Thatcher campaigner; Adam Ridley, former director of the Conservative research unit; Rob Shepherd, TV producer | |
| 7 | 12 September 2003 | Ford Dagenham equal pay strike | Barbara Castle, Employment Secretary, Lil Grisley, trade unionist; Sheila Douglas, trade unionist; Violet Dawson, trade unionist; Bernie Passingham, trade unionist | |
| 8 | 19 September 2003 | Sinking of the Rainbow Warrior | Peter Willcox, skipper; Steve Sawyer, leading Greenpeace campaigner; Grace O'Sullivan, crew; Bryn Jones, Greenpeace's UK Directors | |
| 9 | 8 August 2004 | Britain's hydrogen bomb tests | Frank Corduroy, RAF Valiant jet pilot; Nick Harden, serviceman; Harry O'Sullivan, Sergeant; Michael Ward, District Officer; Eileen Ward, Michael's wife; Peter Jones, scientist | |
| 10 | 15 August 2004 | First women vicars in the Church of England | Angela Berners-Wilsonn, first woman ordained a priest in the Church of England; Christina Rees, member of the Movement for the Ordination of Women; Barry Rogerson, former Bishop of Bristol; Ann Widdecombe, Conservative MP; George Carey, former Archbishop of Canterbury | |
| 11 | 22 August 2004 | Everyman Theatre, Liverpool | Alan Dossor, artistic director; Willy Russell, writer; Barbara Dickson, folk singer; Julie Walters, actress; Matthew Kelly, Roger McGough, poet; Brian Patten, poet; Adrian Henri, poet | |
| 12 | 29 August 2004 | Raising the Mary Rose | Maurice Young, diver; John Adams, diver; Margaret Rule, archaeologist; Alex Hildred, diver; Robert Hardy, actor | |
| 13 | 5 September 2004 | 1975 United Kingdom European Communities membership referendum | Tony Benn, former labour industry secretary; Shirley Williams, former Labour Government's secretary of state for prices; John Mills, the national agent for the No camp; Tom Spencer, Conservative MEP; John Cole, former deputy editor of The Guardian | |
| 14 | 12 September 2004 | Terrence Higgins Trust | Nick Partridge, chief executive; Rupert Whitaker, Terry Higgins' partner; Janet Green, former director of the Terry Higgins Trust; Norman Fowler, former Health Minister | |
| 15 | 26 December 2004 | 1960s supermodels | Celia Hammond, fashion model; Jill Kennington, fashion model; Edina Ronay, actress; David Bailey, photographer | |
| 16 | 24 July 2005 | 1980 Summer Olympics | Duncan Goodhew, swimmer; Joslyn Hoyte-Smith, athlete; Colin Moynihan, rower; Frank Dick, athletics coach | |
| 17 | 31 July 2005 | Not the Nine O'Clock News | John Lloyd, comedian; Rowan Atkinson, comedian; Mel Smith, comedian; Griff Rhys Jones, comedian; Chris Langham, comedian; Pamela Stephenson, comedian | |
| 18 | 7 August 2005 | Abortion Act 1967 campaigners | Diane Munday, activist; Alastair Service, activist; Madeleine Simms, social campaigner; David Steel, former Liberal MP | |
| 19 | 14 August 2005 | Child Internees in Japan | Joyce Nelson, former POW; Jeremy Gotch, former POW; Barbara Sowerby, former POW; Anne Moxley, former POW; Rose Raymond, former POW | |
| 20 | 21 August 2005 | Today newspaper | Eddy Shah, publisher; Brian MacArthur, newspaper editor.; Anthony Holden, broadcaster; Jane Reed, editor; Mary Ann Sieghart, journalist | |
| 21 | 28 August 2005 | Siege of Sarajevo | Ejup Ganić, former Bosnian president; Alan Little, BBC correspondent; Faruk Šabanović, Sarajevan resident | |
| 22 | 4 September 2005 | Twyford Down protest | Barbra Bryant, ex-local councillor; Chris Gillham, prominent member of the Friends of Twyford Down; Rebecca Lush, founder of Earth First!; Paul Kingsnorth, author | |
| 23 | 11 September 2005 | Edinburgh Festival Fringe | | |
| 24 | 2 April 2006 | Gulf War | Tom King, former defence secretary; Patrick Hine, former air chief marshal; Patrick Cordingley, commander of the 7th Armoured Brigade; John Simpson, BBC World Affairs editor; Norman Schwarzkopf, commander in chief of Allied forces in the Gulf | |
| 25 | 9 April 2006 | Serious Fraud Office | Ian Trumper, forensic accountant; Andy Noad, policeman; Robert Wardle, Director of the Serious Fraud Office of England and Wales; Rosalind Wright, lawyer; Chris Dickson, lawyer | |
| 26 | 16 April 2006 | The Family | Paul Watson, filmmaker; Philip Bonham Carter, cameraman; Margaret Wilkins; Heather Wilkins; Marian Wilkins | |
| 27 | 23 April 2006 | England at the 1966 FIFA World Cup | Geoff Hurst, footballer; Martin Peters, footballer; George Cohen, footballer; Alan Leather, manager | |
| 28 | 30 April 2006 | Wedding of Charles and Diana | Michael Shea, the Queen's press secretary; Alan Webster, the dean at St Paul's Cathedral; Elizabeth Emanuel, dress designer; John Johnston, comptroller of the Lord Chamberlain's Office; Arthur Edwards, photographer; David Willcocks, musical director | |
| 29 | 3 September 2006 | Privatisation of British Rail | John Welsby, former chief executive and chairman of British Rail; John MacGregor, former transport secretary; Patrick Brown, former permanent secretary at the Department of Transport; Roger Salmon, director of passenger rail franchising and rail expert; Roger Ford, journalist | |
| 30 | 10 September 2006 | Robben Island | Patrick Lekota, anti-apartheid activist; Saki Macozoma, anti-apartheid activist; Khehla Shubane, anti-apartheid activist; Sedick Isaacs, anti-apartheid activist; Anthony Suze | |
| 31 | 17 September 2006 | TV-am | Peter Jay, broadcaster; Nick Owen, presenter; Greg Dyke, journalist | |
| 32 | 24 September 2006 | Marchioness disaster | Jonathan Pang, survivor; Magda Allani, survivor; Margaret Lockwood Croft, victims mother; Eileen Dallaglio, survivor | |
| 33 | 8 April 2007 | Last Debutantes, 1958 | Elfrida Eden-Fallowfield, niece of the former prime Minister Anthony Eden.; Fiona McCarthy, author; Penny Graham, former model; Maggie Chilton, counselor and a psychotherapist; Diane Nutting, actor | |
| 34 | 15 April 2007 | EastEnders | Anna Wing, actress; Wendy Richard, actress; Leslie Grantham, actor; Jonathan McLeish, first casting director, Bill Lyons, writer | |
| 35 | 22 April 2007 | Milton Keynes | | |
| 36 | 29 April 2007 | British Antarctic Survey | | |
| 37 | 6 May 2007 | Brighton hotel bombing | Anthony Berry, former Conservative MP (Deputy Chief Whip); Eric Taylor, former North-West Area Chairman of the Conservative Party; Jeanne Shattock, wife of the Gordon Shattock, Western Area Chairman of the Conservative Party; Muriel Maclean, wife of Donald Maclean, President of the Scottish Conservatives; Roberta Wakeham, wife of Chief Whip John Wakeham; Patrick Magee, Irish republican; Jo Berry, daughter of Anthony Berry; Harvey Thomas, political advisor; Douglas Hurd, former Secretary of State for Northern Ireland | |
| 38 | 26 August 2007 | Royal Opera House | Jeremy Isaacs, former director of the Royal Opera House (1988–1996); Nicholas Payne, former director of opera between (1993-1998); Chris Smith, culture secretary; Jeremy Dickson, architect; Deborah Bull, dancer | |
| 39 | 2 September 2007 | 1976 Race Relations Act | Anthony Lester, barrister; Dipak Nandy, academic; Jocelyn Barrow, educator; Usha Prashar, crossbench member of the House of Lords.; Herman Ouseley, parliamentarian | |
| 40 | 9 September 2007 | British veterans of the Korean War | | |
| 41 | 16 September 2007 | NME Writers | Charles Shaar Murray, music journalist; Paul Morley, music journalist | |
| 42 | 23 September 2007 | Bhagwan Rajnees | | |
| 43 | 6 April 2008 | Bletchley Park code-breakers. | Sarah Baring, codebreaker; Mavis Batey, codebreaker; Asa Briggs, codebreaker; Ruth Bourne, codebreaker; John Herivel, codebreake | |
| 44 | 13 April 2008 | National Lottery | Virginia Bottomley, former Heritage Secretary; Peter Davis, director general of the regulator OFLOT; Tim Holley, first chief executive of Camelot; Louise O'Flynn, former Camelot's, head of Communications; Raymond Snoddy, media commentator | |
| 45 | 20 April 2008 | D.C.Thomson comics | Maurice Heggie, editor; Dave Torrie, editor; Bill Ritchie, cartoonist; Jim Petrie, comics artist; Walter Fearne, comics artist | |
| 46 | 27 April 2008 | Strangeways Prison riots of 1990 | | |
| 47 | 4 May 2008 | Withnail and I | Bruce Robinson, director; Richard Grant, actor; Ralph Brown, actor; Paul McGann, actor; Richard Griffiths, actor | |
| 48 | 24 August 2008 | Transglobe Expedition | Oliver Shepard, medic; Simon Grimes, mechanic and cook; Janet Camero, London office manager; Anton Bowring, marine co-ordinator; Ranulph Fiennes, expedition leader | |
| 49 | 7 September 2008 | Hitler Diaries | David Irving, amateur historian; Gerd Heidemann, German Stern journalist; Magnus Linklater, The Sunday Times journalist; Phillip Knightley, Australian The Sunday Times journalist | |
| 50 | 14 September 2008 | Windsor Castle fire 1992 | Chris Watson, project manager for the restoration of Windsor Castle, John Thorneycroft, former head of English Heritage's Government and Royal Buildings; Hayden Phillips, former Permanent secretary of the Department of National Heritage; Pamela Lewis, restorationer; Dickie Arbiter, former Queen's press secretary | |
| 51 | 21 September 2008 | Construction of the Channel Tunnel | Neville Sims, former co-chairman of Anglo-French team; Graham Corbett, former chief financial officer; Anthony Gueterbock, civil engineer; Tony Gueterbock; Public Affairs Manager for Eurotunnel; Helen Nattrass, senior, geotechnical engineer; Graham Fagg, tunneller | |
| 52 | 21 September 2008 | The Navy Lark | June Whitfield, actress; Leslie Phillips, actor; George Evans, writer; Heather Chesen, actress; Tenniel Evans, actor | |
| 53 | 5 April 2009 | National Theatre | Laurence Olivier, artistic director; Michael Gambon, actor; Derek Jacobi, actor; Maggie Smith, actress; Dame Joan , actress | |
| 54 | 12 April 2009 | Hillsborough disaster | Jenni Hicks, mother who lost her teenage daughters Sarah and Victoria; Margaret Aspinall, mother of 18 year old James who died; Tony Edwards, South Yorkshire Metropolitan Ambulance Service; Colin Moneypenny, survivor; Rogan Taylor, founder member of the Football Supporters' Association | |
| 55 | 19 April 2009 | Brit Art | Tracey Emin, artist; Gavin Turk, artist; Abigail Lane, artist; Mat Collishaw, artist; Gregor Muir, artist | |
| 56 | 26 April 2009 | Thalidomide scandal | Margaret Hogg, former chair of the Thalidomide Society; Louise Mehtas Mansell, campaigner and author; Fred Dove, broadcaster; Peter Ashmole, thalidomide distributor Distiller; Claus Newman, pediatrician | |
| 57 | 3 May 2009 | Beirut hostages | John McCarthy, hostage; Brian Keenan, hostage; Terry Waite, hostage; Jill Morrell, campaigner | |
| 58 | 23 August 2009 | Kerry Packer and the World Series Cricket 1977 | Clive Lloyd, former West Indies captain; Jeff Thomson, Australian fast bowler; Tony Greig, former England captain; Mike Denness, former team manager for Packer's World Series, Christopher Martin-Jenkins, commentator and writer | |
| 59 | 30 August 2009 | 1983–1985 famine in Ethiopia | Michael Buerk, reporter; Claire Bertschinger, nurse; Hugh Goyder, former head of Oxfam; Dawit Wolde Giorgis, Ethiopian relief effort; Brian Barder, UK Ambassador to the Ethiopia | |
| 60 | 6 September 2009 | Iranian Embassy Siege | Sim Harrs, hostage; Mustapha Karkouti, hostage; Max Vernon, police negotiator; Kate Adie, BBC; Robin Horsfall, SAS commando | |
| 61 | 13 September 2009 | Nelson Mandela Release | Desmond Tutu, Archbishop; Niel Barnard, former head of South Africa's National Intelligence Service; Willie Esterhuyse, Afrikaaner academic; Aziz Pahad, member of the ANC; Thabo Mbeki, former president of South Africa; Allister Sparks, journalist; FW de Klerk, former state president of South Africa | |
| 62 | 20 September 2009 | Stonewall | Ian McKellen, actor; Matthew Parris, LGBT rights campaigner; Lisa Power, LGBT rights campaigner; Michael Cashman, LGBT rights campaigner; Olivette Cole-Wilson, LGBT rights campaigner | |
| 63 | 4 April 2010 | London Marathon | David Bedford, race director; John Disley, Olympic steeplechase winner; John Bryant, journalist and marathon historian; Hugh Jones, course measurer; Veronique Marot, marahon winner | |
| 64 | 11 April 2010 | Brideshead Revisited | Jeremy Irons, narrator; Anthony Andrews, actor; Claire Bloom, actress; Charles Sturridge, director; Derek Granger, producer; Diana Quick, actress | |
| 65 | 18 Apr 2010 | Maze Prison | Raymond McCartney, former Republican prisoner; Pat Sheehan, former Republican prisoners; Billy McQuiston, former Loyalist prisoner; Des Waterworth, prison officer; Oliver Crilly, priest; Chris Ryder, journalist | |
| 66 | 25 April 2010 | Dunblane school massacre | Eileen Harrild, school teacher; Mick North, victims parent; Pam Ross, victims parent; Marie Sinclair, social worker; Jenny Shields, Sunday Times writer | |
| 67 | 2 May 2010 | The Tonight Programme | Alasdair Milne, television producer; Donald Baverstock, television producer; Antony Jay, television writer; Cynthia Kee, booking agent; Jack Gold, television producer; Julian Pettifer, television journalist; Cliff Michelmore, television presenter; Alan Whicker, journalist; Cy Grant, musician | |
| 68 | 22 August 2010 | Millennium Dome | Jennie Page, Dome's former chief executive.; Mike Davies, architect; Charles Falconer, minister for the Dome; Eva Jiřičná, designer; Peter Higgins, creative director | |
| 69 | 29 August 2010 | Hurricane Katrina | Russel L. Honoré, commander of Joint Task Force Katrina; Doug Thornton, manager of the Superdome; Ted Jackson, photojournalist; Willie Walker, pastor; Phyllis Montana-LeBlanc, actress | |
| 70 | 5 September 2010 | Miss World 1970 | Peter Jolley, key organiser; Michael Aspel, presenter for the BBC; Jo Robinson, protester; Sally Alexander, protester; Jenny Fortune, protester; Jennifer Hosten, former Miss World of 1970 | |
| 71 | 12 September 2010 | Kindertransport | Alf Dubs, former Labour Member of Parliament.; Hella Pick, journalist; Ruth Humphreys, Kindertransport refugees; Erich Reich , Kindertransport refugees; Ruth Barnett, Holocaust survivor | |
| 72 | 19 September 2010 | Play School | Joy Whitby, television presenter; Floella Benjamin, television presenter; Brian Cant, television presenter; Toni Arthur, director; Jonathan Cohen, musical director/pianist | |
| 73 | 6 March 2011 | UNHCR Bosnia | Tony Land, Chief of Operations for the UN refugee agency; Larry Hollingworth, logistics officer with UNHCR; Amira Sadicovic, UNHCR's external relations officer; Kris Janowski, UNHCR field-worker; Paddy Ashdown, British politician; Misha Glenny; BBC reporter | |
| 74 | 13 March 2011 | Comic Relief | Richard Curtis, co-founder of Comic Relief; Lenny Henry, comedian; Griff Rhys Jones, comedian; Helen Fielding, screenwriter; Paddy Coulter, head of media at Oxfam | |
| 75 | 20 March 2011 | Brixton Riots | Alex Wheatle, novelist; Ted Knight, former the leader of Lambeth Borough Council; Darcus Howe, journalist and broadcaster; Brian Paddick, former policemen; Peter Bleksley, former policemen | |
| 76 | 27 March 2011 | British Rock and Rollers | Bruce Welch, musician; Terry Dene, singer; Vince Eager, musician; Marty Wilde, singer; Larry Parnes, music artist; Clem Cattini, drummer | |
| 77 | 7 August 2011 | Barings Bank Collapse | Nick Leeson, stock trader; Peter Norris, senior figure in the Virgin Group; Andrea Leadsom, Conservative MP; Nicholas Edwards, investment banker; Alan Bloom, administrator of Barings; John Gapper, commentator of the Financial Times | |
| 78 | 14 August 2011 | Courtauld Institute | Anita Brookner, author; Neil MacGregor, historian; Michael Jacobs, travel-writer; Anna Somers Cocks, founder of the Art Newspaper; Brian Sewell, art critic | |
| 79 | 26 August 2011 | Zeebrugge Ferry Disaster | Simon Osborne, survivor; Margaret de Rohan, victmis relative; Malcolm Shakesby, rescue operator; Bill Moses, Dover Counselling Centre co-founder; Ian Dand, investigater | |
| 80 | 28 August 2011 | Boys from the Blackstuff | Julie Walters, actress; Alan Bleasdale, screenwriter; Tom Georgeson, actor; Michael Angelis, actor; Michael Wearing, television producer, | |
| 81 | 4 September 2011 | Hunting Ban | | |
| 82 | 11 September 2011 | Les Miserables | Cameron Mackintosh, producer; Claude-Michel Schonberg, composer; Michael Ball, actor; Herbert Kretzmer, lyricist; John Caird, director | |
| 83 | 1 April 2012 | 1948 Olympic Games | Dorothy Tyler, olympic medalist; Dorothy Manley, olympic medalist; Tommy Godwin, olympic medalist; John Parlett, olympic medalist; Roger Bannister, former Assistant to the Chef de Mission for the Games | |
| 84 | 8 April 2012 | Greenham Common | Helen John, protester; Katherine Jones, protester; Rebecca Johnson, peace activist; Mick Marsh, base commander; Mick Eathorne-Gibbons, Conservative councillor for Greenham. | |
| 85 | 15 April 2012 | HMS Sheffield | | |
| 86 | 22 April 2012 | Globe Theatre | Patrick Spottiswoode, the first director of education; Diana Devlin, author; Jon Greenfield, architect; Claire van Kampen, the first director of music; Zoe Wanamaker, honorary president of Shakespeare's Globe | |
| 87 | 29 April 2012 | Hong Kong Handover | Chris Patten, Hong Kong's 28th and last governor; Bryan Dutton, head of the British garrison on in Hong Kong; Hugh Davies, diplomat; Emily Lau, pro-democracy campaigner; David Tang, Hong Kong businessman | |
| 88 | 19 August 2012 | 60s Girl Singers | Petula Clark, child star; Sandie Shaw, pop singer; Helen Shapiro, pop singer; Jackie Trent, singer; Petula Clark, singer; Scott Walker, singer; Vicki Wickham, manager | |
| 89 | 26 August 2012 | Ugandan Asians | Manzoor Moghal, businessman; Tahera Aanchawan, physiotherapist; Ravi Govindia, Councillor; Chandrika Joshi, dentist; Yasmin Alibhai-Brown, journalist | |
| 90 | 2 September 2012 | Poll Tax | Kenneth Baker, Local Government Minister; Chris Brearley, civil servant; David Magor, assistant treasurer of Oxford City Council; Danny Burns, co-ordinater; Chris Moyers, protester | |
| 91 | 9 September 2012 | Dolly the Sheep | Ian Wilmut, former head of the Dolly team; Keith Campbell, professor; Bill Ritchie, embryologist; Marjorie Ritchie, surgeon; John Bracken, anaesthetist | |
| 92 | 16 September 2012 | Big Brother | Peter Bazalgette, producer; Victor Lewis Smith, critic; Tim Gardam, former Channel 4's Director of Programmes | |
| 93 | 7 April 2013 | Doctor Who | Waris Hussein, director; Carole Ann Ford, actor; William Russell, actor; Jeremy Young, actor; Peter Purves, TV presenter | |
| 94 | 14 April 2013 | King's Cross fire | Sophie Tarrasenko, passenger; Kwasi Afari Minta, survivor; Steve Heather, firefighter; Lindsay Taylor, reporter | |
| 95 | 21 April 2013 | Coronation Maids of Honour | | |
| 96 | 28 April 2013 | The Centre for Alternative Technology | Mark Matthews, the Centre's first director; Roderick James, architect; Bob Todd, technical expert; Liz Todd, Bob's wife; Des Rees, builder | |
| 97 | 5 May 2013 | Hutton Inquiry | Andrew Gilligan, reporter; Geoff Hoon, former defence secretary; Tom Kelly, Tony Blair's spokesman; Greg Dyke, former Director General | |
| 98 | 18 August 2013 | Goodness Gracious Me | Meera Syal, comedian; Sanjeev Bhaskar, actor; Anil Gupta, actor; Jon Plowman, TV producer; Richard Pinto, writer | |
| 99 | 25 August 2013 | Lib Lab Pact | David Steel, former leader of the Liberal Party; Tom McNally, James Callaghan's closest aid; Michael White, sketch writer; Roy Hattersley, former Labour Cabinet minister; Alan Beith, former Liberal Party whip | |
| 100 | 1 September 2013 | Assassination of John F. Kennedy | Gayle Newman, closest eyewitness; Hugh Aynesworth, former Dallas Morning New reporter; Kenneth Salyer, medical team member at the Parkland Hospital; James Leavelle, retired Dallas homicide detective | |
| 101 | 8 September 2013 | Jersey Occupation | Bob Le Sueur, insurance clerk; Leo Harris, war time teenager; Michael Ginns, former WWW2 POW; Hazel Lakeman, former POW; John Floyd, Jersey resident | |
| 102 | 15 September 2013 | Spare Rib magazine | Marsha Rowe, editor; Rosie Boycott, journalist; Angela Phillips, journalist | |
| 103 | 25 December 2013 | The Fast Show | Charlie Higson, actor; Paul Whitehouse, comedian; Kathy Burke, actress; Harry Enfield, actor; Vic Reeves, actor; Bob Mortimer, comedian; Matthew Norman , TV critic | |
| 104 | 6 April 2014 | UK miners' strike (1984–85) | Kim Howells, former research officer for the South Wales NUM; Mel Hepworth, labour; Barbara Jackson, organiser; Ken Clarke, former health minister; Bill King, Bedfordshire Police | |
| 105 | 13 April 2014 | Four Weddings and a Funeral | Mike Newell, film director; Richard Curtis, film maker; Duncan Kenworthy, television procuder; Kristin Scott Thomas, actress; James Fleet, actor | |
| 106 | 20 April 2014 | Life on Earth | David Attenborough, environmentalist; Richard Brock, producer; Pam Jackson, producer assistant; Jane Wales, producer assistant | |
| 107 | 4 May 2014 | Omagh Bombing | Kevin Skelton, victims relative; Michael Gallagher, victims relative; Victor Barker, victims relative; Richard Scott, former RUC police constable; Mark Devenport, BBC Northern Ireland's Political Editor | |
| 108 | 17 August 2014 | Berlin Airlift | Dick Arscott, RAF Dakota pilot; Joyce Hargrave-Wright, air traffic controller; Alec Chambers, flight engineer; Fred Danckwardt, head of security at the British airbase RAF Gatow; Freddie Montgomery, British military intelligence | |
| 109 | 24 August 2014 | Sun Newspaper | Tom Petrie, news editor; Harry Arnold, Royal correspondent; Wendy Henry, editor of the Sun's sister paper The News of the World | |
| 110 | 31 August 2014 | Independence of Zimbabwe in 1980 | Peter Carrington, former Conservative foreign secretary; Dumiso Dabengwa, former head of intelligence for the military wing of ZAPU; Dzingai Mutumbuka, member of the ZANU-PF delegation; Dennis Norman, President of the Rhodesia National Farmers' Union; Martin Meredith, historian and Africa correspondent | |
| 111 | 7 September 2014 | James Bond | John Glen, director of the Bond franchise; Richard Kiel, Bond actor; Britt Ekland, Bond girl | |
| 112 | 19 September 2014 | New Labour | Peter Mandelson, former Labour MP; Anji Hunter, former Labour MP; Margaret McDonagh, Regional Party organizer, Margaret Beckett, Deputy Labour Leader; Peter Hyman, Labour strategy | |
| 113 | 25 December 2014 | Wallace and Gromit | Peter Lord, Aardman founders; David Sproxton, Aardman founders; Carla Shelley, producer; Mary Lowance, ex-manager; Nick Park, and Wallace and Gromit creator | |
| 114 | 5 April 2015 | Spycatcher | Robert Armstrong, civil servant; Paul Greengrass, film director; Stella Rimington, former director general of MI5, Brian Perman, managing director of the publishers Heinemann; Richard Norton-Taylor, Guardian journalist | |
| 115 | 12 April 2015 | Fastnet Race Disaster | Jerry Grayson, helicopter pilot; Alan Green, sports commentator; Nick Ward, sailor; Christian Schaumloffel, helped rescue Nick Ward; Stuart Quarrie, trainees | |
| 116 | 19 April 2015 | Hit Factory | Sinitta Donovan, actor; Jason Donovan, actor; Pete Waterman, procuder; Phil Harding, producer | |
| 117 | 26 April 2015 | Far East Prisoners of War | Bob Morrell, former POW; Bill Frankland, medical officer; William Mumby, former POW; Tony Lucas, former POW; Sibylla Jane Flower, historian | |
| 118 | 3 May 2015 | Peter Brook's A Midsummer Night's Dream | Peter Brook, film director; Sally Jacobs, designer; Ben Kingsley, actor; Sara Kestelman, actress; Frances de la Tour, actress; Barry Stanton, actor | |
| 119 | 16 August 2015 | Guantanamo Bay | Sami al-Hajj, Guantanamo detainee; Moazzam Begg, Guantanamo detainee; Mike Bumgarner, head of the guard force at Guantanamo; Clive Stafford Smith, lawyer | |
| 120 | 23 August 2015 | Food writers | Mary Berry; Rose Elliot; Prue Leith; Claudia Roden; Katharine Whitehorn | |
| 121 | 30 August 2015 | Foot-and-Mouth Disease | Alex Donaldson, scientist; Peter Frost-Pennington, vet; Hugh Monro, brigadier; Paula Wolton, farmer; Peter Allen, farmer | |
| 122 | 6 September 2015 | Alan Bennett's Talking Heads | Penelope Wilton, actress; Tristram Powell, director | |
| 123 | 13 September 2015 | Birmingham Six | Paddy Hill, victims relative; Chris Mullin, journalist; Brian Hambleton, victims relative | |
| 124 | 3 April 2016 | Nuclear Submarines | Peter Hammersley; David Wixon; John Jacobsen; Bas Bowyer; Harry Brazie; Wally Whymark | |
| 125 | 10 April 2016 | Disability Campaigners | Jane Campbell, disability rights campaigner; Bert Massie, disability rights campaigner.; Peter White, broadcast journalist; William Hague, Conservative MP; Adam Thomas, disability rights campaigner. | |
| 126 | 17 April 2016 | UEFA Euro 1996 | Darren Anderton, footballer; Ted Buxton, assistant manager; David Davies, press team manager; Harry Harris, Daily Mail journalist; Barry Davies, BBC reporter | |
| 127 | 24 April 2016 | Maastricht Treaty | Norman Lamont, former Chancellors of the Exchequer; Kenneth Clarke, Conservative MP; David Davies, Conservative MP; Bill Cash, and Conservative backbencher; Stephen Wall, historian | |
| 128 | 6 May 2016 | Arrest of Augusto Pinochet | Juan Garces, a former aide to Salvador Allende; Jack Straw, former home secretary; Juan Guzman, Chilean Judge | |
| 129 | 21 August 2016 | Yorkshire Ripper Investigation | John Domaille, a senior officer at the West Yorkshire Police; Andy Laptew, junior detective; Elaine Benson, detective; David Zackrisson, detective .; Christa Ackroyd, journalist | |
| 130 | 28 August 2016 | Glastonbury Festival | Arthur Brown, musician; Jekka McVicar, organic herb grower; Melanie Brown, singer; Michael Eavis, dairy farmer; Chris Church, festival participant | |
| 131 | 4 September 2016 | Launch of Private Eye | Christopher Booker, journalist; Richard Ingrams, journalist; Barry Fantoni, cartoonist; Gerald Scarfe, cartoonist; Peter Usborne, publisher | |
| 132 | 11 September 2016 | Contaminated Blood | David Watters, director of the Haemophilia Society; Colette Wintel, hepatitis B and hepatitis C patient; Peter Jones, head of the Newcastle Haemophilia Centre; Janette Johnson, relative of the AIDS and hepatitis C patient | |
| 133 | 23 September 2016 | Tate Modern | Nicholas Serota, former director of Tate; Frances Morris, former curator at the Tate Modern; Dawn Austwick, former director at the Tate Modern; Michael Craig-Martin, artist; Anish Kapoor, artist | |
| 134 | 2 April 2017 | Vietnamese Boat People | Graham MacQueen, Wellpark's Training Officer, Philip Huynh, former refugee; Diep Quan, former refugee; Dao Nguyen, former refugee; James Huynh, former refugee | |
| 135 | 9 April 2017 | Libyan Embassy Siege | Oliver Miles, former British ambassador in Tripoli.; John Murray, PC at the Metropolitan Police.; Colin Reeve, Detective Superintendent at the Met; Adel Mansouri, former Libyan student | |
| 136 | 16 April 2017 | Women of Punk | Gaye Advert, bass player; Toyah Willcox, tomboy; Gina Birch, punk artist; Tessa Pollitt, punk artist; Vivien Goldman, punk artist | |
| 137 | 23 April 2017 | Challenger Disaster | June Scobee Rodgers, widow of the Challenger Commander Richard Scobee; Steve Nesbitt, NASA Chief Commentator; Norman Thagard, astronaut; Allan J. McDonald, aerospace engineer; Morton Thiokol, former Director of the Space Shuttle Rocket Booster Project. | |
| 138 | 30 April 2017 | Climbie Inquiry | Herbert Laming, Chairman of the Inquiry; Neil Garnham, Counsel to the Inquiry | |
| 139 | 13 August 2017 | First all-female Round the World Yacht Crew | Tracy Edwards, skipper; Howard Gibbons, skipper; Mikaela Von Koskull, helms; Nancy Harris, and sail-trimmer | |
| 140 | 20 August 2017 | Wapping Dispute | Brenda Dean, General Secretary of the SOGAT Union.; Marie Alvarado, clerical worker; Paul King, machine minder | |
| 141 | 27 August 2017 | Eighties Fashion Designers | Bruce Oldfield, fashion designer; Betty Jackson, fashion designer; Wendy Dagworthy, former fashion designer | |
| 142 | 3 September 2017 | Solidarity | Janusz Onyszkiewicz, Solidarity's former spokesman; Ewa Kulik, Polish trade unionist; Jacek Petrycki, film maker | |
| 143 | 10 September 2017 | Northern Rock crisis | Robert Peston, BBC's Business Editor; Dennis Grainger, former Northern Rock employee; Alastair Balls, Chair of the Northern Rock Foundation; Jayne-Anne Gadhia, Chief Executive of Virgin Money | |
| 144 | 1 April 2018 | Battle for Basra | Robin Brims, UK general; James Dutton, British Marine; Graham Binns, major general; Caroline Wyatt, BBC's former defence correspondent; Rory Stewart, former Coalition deputy Governor in Southern Iraq. | |
| 145 | 8 April 2018 | Enfield Poltergeist | Roz Morris, former BBC Radio reporter; Graham Morris, former Daily Mirror editor; Richard Grosse, solicitor | |
| 146 | 15 April 2018 | Kyoto Protocol | Joanna Depledge, former UN's Climate Secretariat, John Gummer, former British Environment Minster; Tony Juniper, campaigner; Farhana Yamin, lawyer | |
| 147 | 22 April 2018 | Baader-Meinhof | Peter Jurgen Boock, gang member; Rainer Hofmeyer, former West German counter-terrorism chief; Kurt Groenewold, radical lawyer; Stephan Aust, journalist | |
| 148 | 29 April 2018 | The Young Ones | Nigel Planer, actor; Chris Ryan, actor; Alexei Sayle, actor; Lise Mayer, co-writer; Stephen Frost, actor | |
| 149 | 12 August 2018 | The Rise and Fall of the SDP | Shirley Williams, academic; Dick Newby, SDP's former chief exec; Mike Thomas, defecting Labour | |
| 150 | 19 August 2018 | Auschwitz Survivors | Susan Pollack, Auschwitz survivor; Anita Lasker-Wallfisch, Auschwitz survivor; Zigi Shipper, Auschwitz survivor; Lily Ebert, Auschwitz survivor | |
| 151 | 26 August 2018 | Murder of Georgi Markov | Peter Udell, Georgi Markov's manager; Bernard Riley, doctor; Rumiana Ebert, Bulgarian émigré; Michael Cockerell, BBC Panorama reporter | |
| 152 | 2 September 2018 | Chickenshed Theatre | Jo Collins, founder of the Chickenshed; Mary Ward, founder of the Chickenshed; Simon Callow, actor; Lucia Bellini, former Chickenshed member; Emma Cambridge, former Chickenshed member; Jessica Wall, former Chickenshed member | |
| 153 | 9 September 2018 | Sierra Leone Civil War | Sorious Samura, Sierra Leonean camera-man; Peter Penfold, former British High Commissioner to Sierra Leone; Martha Khanu, Sierra Leonean teenager; Zainab Bangura, social activist | |
| 154 | 7 April 2019 | French Resistance | Marcel Jaurent Singer, secret agent of the Special Operations Executive; Rene Marbot, soldier in de Gaulle's Free French army; John James, member of a guerrilla fighting unit; Michèle Agniel, Allied collaborator; Matthew Cobb, historian | |
| 155 | 14 April 2019 | Parliamentary Expenses Scandal | Heather Brooke, FOI campaigner; Andrew Walker, head of House of Commons finances; Ann Cryer, former Labour MP for Keighley | |
| 156 | 21 April 2019 | Gulf War Aircrew POWs | John Peters, Flight Lieutenant; John Nichol, airmen; Robbie Stewart, Flight Lieutenant; Helen Peters, John Peters wife | |
| 157 | 28 April 2019 | Scottish Parliament | Henry McLeish, former first minister of Scotland; Donald Dewar, special adviser; Wendy Alexander, Labour MSP; Jim Wallace, leader of the Scottish Lib-Dems; Roseanna Cunningham, SNP MSP; David Steel, Parliament's first Presiding Officer, | |
| 158 | 5 May 2019 | Pioneering Women Newsreaders | Angela Rippon, TV presenter; Julia Somerville, ITN newscaster; Jan Leeming, BBC newsreader; Sue Lawley, broadcaster | |
| 159 | 18 August 2019 | York Minster fire | John Toy, former Canon Chancellor; Alan Stow, retired fire commander; Bishop David Wilbourne, a chaplain in York; John David, master mason; Geoff Brayshaw, lead joiner | |
| 160 | 25 August 2019 | Death on the Rock | Roger Bolton, the programme's researcher; Alison Cahn, eyewitness; Stephen Bullock, Ministry of Defence; Hugh Colver, former Chief of PR; Alastair Brett, legal manager for the Sunday Times | |
| 161 | 1 September 2019 | When Rugby Turned Pro | Brian Moore, former England player; John Devereux, Welsh International; Michael Lynagh, Australia captain; Tony Hallett, former secretary of the English Rugby Football Union; Mick Cleary, Daily Telegraph’s Rugby Union Correspondent | |
| 162 | 8 September 2019 | Alder Hey Organs Scandal | Jan Robinson, victims parent; Jan Valentine, victims parent; Mark Caswell, haematologist; Kate Jackson, director of the hospital's Serious Incident Team; Clare Smith, Health and Family Correspondent for BBC North West. | |
| 163 | 15 September 2019 | Cats - The Musical | Trevor Nunn, Cats' director; John Napier, stage designer; Elaine Paige, actress; Wayne Sleep, ballet dancer; Bonnie Langford, actress; Paul Nicholas, actor | |
| 164 | 16 August 2020 | Black Wednesday | Norman Lamont, chancellor; Kenneth Clarke, home secretary; Alex Allan, John Major's principal private secretary; Mark Clarke, foreign exchange dealer at the Bank of America; Jim Trott, Bank of England's chief currency dealer; Jeff Randall, Sunday Times City Editor | |
| 165 | 23 August 2020 | Collapse of British Leyland | Harold Musgrove, chief executive of the Austin Rover Group.; John Power, former shop steward; Chris Green, former commercial apprentice at British Leyland's vast Longbridge plant.; Alison Harper, design sculptor.; Chris Goffey, journalist | |
| 166 | 30 August 2020 | Bid for London 2012 | Barbara Cassani, chair of the bid; Keith Mills, chief executive; Jonathan Edwards, member of the Athletes Advisory Board; Tanni Grey-Thompson, member of the Athletes Advisory Board; Richard Caborn, former minister for sport; Craig Reedie, former member of the International Olympic Committee; Sebastian Coe, member of the Bid Chair | |
| 167 | 6 September 2020 | GM Crops Debate | Joan Ruddock, Committee for Environment, Food and Rural Affairs.; John Gatehouse, biochemist; Tom Sanders, former member of the UK Committee on Novel Foods.; Sue Mayer, founder of anti-GM organisation, GeneWatch.; Alan Simpson, former Labour MP; Jim Thoma, Greenpeace activist | |
| 168 | 13 September 2020 | Virago Press | Ursula Owen, editor; Alexandra Pringle, former Virago's Editorial Director; Lennie Goodings, former publicist; Mary Chamberlain, author; Hermione Lee, biographer | |
| 169 | 24 December 2020 | Strictly Come Dancing | John Byrnes, Dance consultant; Natasha Kaplinsky, news presenter; Lesley Garrett, star soprano; Anton Du Beke, dancer; Karen Smith, Executive producer | |
| 170 | 30 December 2020 | The COVID-19 ward | Hugh Montgomery, doctor; Jo Eardley, senior nurse; Amanda Macaskill Stewart, doctor; Emma Williams, wife of Covid patient | |
| 171 | 4 April 2021 | Finding Richard III | Philippa Langley, Richard III Society; Richard Buckley, archaeologic at the University of Leicester; Jo Appleby, osteologist; Turi King, genologic; Michael Ibsen, distance relative of Richard III; David Monteith, the Dean of Leicester; Thomas Penn, Historian and writer | |
| 172 | 11 April 2021 | Deepwater Horizon Oil Spill | Mark Mazzella, BP's control expert; Thad Allen, National Incident Commander; PJ Hahn, former director of coastal zone management for Plaquemines parish, Louisiana; Keith Jones, Deepwater Horizon's employees parent; Bob Kaluza, BP supervisor | |
| 173 | 18 April 2021 | Litvinenko Poisoning | Alex Goldfarb, family friend of the Litvinenko's; Ken Macdonald, former director of public prosecutions of England and Wales; Brent Hyatt, Scotland Yard office; Yevgeny Kanevskyv, journalist at the BBC World Service's Russian Service; Marina Litvinenko, Alexander Litvinenko's widow. | |
| 174 | 25 April 2021 | The Romanian Orphanages | Anneka Rice, television presenter; Monica McDaid, former teacher; Jane Nicholson, founder of the Romanian orphanage charity FARA; Mark Cook, Hope & Homes for Children, Iuliana Georgiana, Romanian orphanage; Alexandra Smart, Romanian orphanage | |
| 175 | 2 May 2021 | Madness | Mike Barson, songwriter; Mark Bedford, musician; Chris Foreman, musician; Clive Langer, producer | |
| 176 | 13 August 2021 | Same-Sex Marriage | Peter Tatchell, activist; Lynne Featherstone, former Equalities Minister; Benjamin Cohen, CEO of Pink News; Malcolm Brown, Director of Mission and Public Affairs for the Church of England; Nick Herbert, the Conservative MP | |
| 177 | 20 August 2021 | The Day Today | Patrick Marber, actor; David Schneider, actor; Steve Coogan, actor; Doon Mackichan, actor | |
| 178 | 27 August 2021 | Tiananmen Square Protests | James Miles, BBC's Beijing correspondent; Diane Wei Liang, writer; Zhou Fenghsou, student leader; Wu'erkaixi, student leader | |
| 179 | 3 September 2021 | Pioneers of Women's Football | Patricia Gregory, football player; Elsie Cook, football player; Margaret Rae, football player; Michelle Adams, football player; Rose Reilly, football player; Sue Whyatt, football player | |
| 180 | 10 September 2021 | Trial of the Mangrove Nine | Clive Phillip; Desmond Gittens, Black People's Information Centre's director; Aisha Gittens, Desmand's daughter; Farrukh Dhondy, writer; Gus John, writer | |
| 181 | 24 December 2021 | Love Actually | Thomas Brodie-Sangster, Child actor; Olivia Olson, child actor; Lucia Moniz, pop star; Duncan Kenworthy, producer | |
| 182 | 1 April 2022 | Boxing Day Tsunami | Novia Liza, former university student living in Aceh; Andy Chaggar, engineer; Kontoro Mangkusbroto, Head of reconstruction and rehabilitation in Aceh | |
| 183 | 8 April 2022 | McLibel Trial | Helen Steel, former McDonald's employeer; Dave Morris, former McDonald's employeer; Timothy Atkinson, McDonald's legal team, Franny Armstrong, film director | |
| 184 | 22 April 2022 | Opening Ceremony of the London Olympics | Stephen Daldry, executive producer; Suttirat Larlarb, designer; Evelyn Glennie, percussionist; Sam Hunter, production stage manager; Rex Osafo-Asare, volunteer | |
| 185 | 29 April 2022 | Dale Farm Evictions | Candy Sheridan, member of the Gypsy Council; Katharine Quarmby, journalist | |
| 186 | 6 May 2022 | Silver Jubilee | Dickie Arbiter, veteran Royal commendator; Hugo Vickers, Royal biographer; Mary Pearson, daughter of the Martin Charteris who was the Queen's Private Secretary | |
| 187 | 19 August 2022 | Grange Hill | Todd Carty, actor; Lee MacDonald, actor; Erkan Mustafa, actor | |
| 188 | 26 August 2022 | London Occupy | | |
| 189 | 2 September 2022 | Deep Blue v Kasparov | Frederic Friedel, advisor to Garry Kasparov; Malcolm Pein, Kasparov team member and IBM consultant; Murray Campbell, co-creator of Deep Blue; Joel Benjamin, IBM consultant; Maurice Ashley, author and commentator; Steven Levy, Editor | |
| 190 | 4 September 2022 | Island Records | Chris Blackwell, producer; Jimmy Cliff, musician; Mykaell Riley, reggae act; Owen Gray, musician; Marcia Griffiths, musician | |
| 191 | 1 October 2022 | Maidan Uprising | Hanna Hopko, representative of the Maidan Public Sector; Valentyn Nalyvaichenko, former head of the secret service.; Arseniy Yatsenyuk, former leader of one of the opposition parties; Yaroslav Hrytsak, historian; Gabriel Gatehouse, a BBC Correspondent. | |
| 192 | 2 April 2023 | British Runners of the 1980s | Steve Cram, runner; Brendan Foster, runner; David Moorcroft, runner; Sebastian Coe, runner | |
| 193 | 9 April 2023 | The Good Friday Agreement | Jonathan Powell, former chief of staff to Tony Blair; Monica McWilliams, co-founded the Northern Ireland Women's Coalition; Paul Bew, historian.; Mark Durkan, member of the Social Democratic and Labour Party negotiating team; Mark Devenport, BBC Ireland correspondent; Bertie Ahern, former Irish Taoiseach | |
| 194 | 16 April 2023 | Sharpe | Bernard Cornwell, author; Stuart Sutherland, actor; Michael Cochrane, actor; Diana Perez, actor | |
| 195 | 23 April 2023 | Abu Ghraib | Sam Provance, former U.S. Army military intelligence sergeant; Janis Karpinski, former brigadier general; Haj Ali Abbas, Iraqi prisoner; Katherine Gallagher, Lawyer | |
| 196 | 5 May 2023 | Eurovision Song Contest | Phil Coulter, musician; Dana, musician; Lulu, musician; Pete Murray, broadcaster; Dean Vuletic, historian | |
| 197 | 18 Aug 2023 | Jerry Springer: The Opera | Richard Thomas, comedian; Stewart Lee, comedian; Loré Lixenberg, mezzo soprano; David Bedella, actor; Michael Brandon, actor | |
| 198 | 20 Aug 2023 | Lockerbie Bombing | Colin Dorrance, police officer; Les Gracie, firefighter; Marjorie McQueen, Lockerbie resident; Annie Lareau, former student at Syracuse University; David Wilson, Lockerbie resident | |
| 199 | 27 Aug 2023 | Final Years of John Major's Government | Kenneth Clarke, former chancellor of the exchequer; John Redwood, Consertative MP; Elinor Goodman, Channel 4's political editor; Howell James, former Prime Minister's Political Secretary | |
| 200 | 3 Sep 2023 | Spitting Image | Peter Fluck, co-creator; Roger Law, co-creator; Jon Blair, producer; John Lloyd, producer; Ian Hislop, writer; Nick Newman, writer; Louise Gold, puppeteer; Chris Barrie, voice artist; Steve Nallon, voice artist; Charles Denton, Central Television commissioner | |
| 201 | 15 Sep 2023 | BLK Art Group | Marlene Smith, artist and curator; Eugene Palmer, member of the BLK Art Group; Tam Joseph, member of the BLK Art Group; Pogus Caesar, photographer; Wenda Leslie, founding member of the BLK Art Group | |
| 202 | 29 Dec 2023 | Band Aid | Bob Geldof, singer; Boy George, singer; Bono, singer | |
| 203 | 12 April 2024 | That's Life! | Esther Rantzen, TV and radio presenter; George Layton, TV and radio presenter; Chris Serle, TV and radio presenter; Paul Heiney, TV and radio presenter; Bill Buckley, radio presenter; Adrian Mills, TV and radio presenter; Peter Bazalgette, TV and radio presenter; Jane Elsdon, director | |
| 204 | 14 April 2024 | 1996 Mount Everest disaster | Lene Gammelgaard, a mountaineer: Helen Wilton, basecamp manager; Makalu Gau, Leader of the Taiwanese expedition team; Neil Laughton, mountaineer; Alan Hinkes, mountaineer; Mike Trueman, mountaineer | |
| 205 | 21 April 2024 | Passion of Port Talbot | Michael Sheen, actor: Di Botcher, Port Talbot actress; Sarah Hemsley-Cole, director; Mydd Pharo, costume designer; Mercedes Kemp, Ken Tucker, critic | |
| 206 | 28 April 2024 | Bush v Gore 2000 | Elaine Kamarck and Carter Eskew, policy advisors to Al Gore; Ted Olson, lead attorney to George W. Bush; Benjamin Ginsberg, national council to the Bush campaign; Jeffrey Toobin, journalist and author | |
| 207 | 10 May 2024 | London Olympics: Super Saturday | Jessica Ennis-Hill, Olympic tracker; Laura Kenny, Olympic cyclist; Andrew Triggs Hodge, Olympic rower; Steve Cram, Olympic tracker; Carl Hicks; Mo Farah, Olympic tracker | |
| 208 | 23 August 2024 | Blair government's first 100 days | Jonathan Powell, chief of staff; Alex Allan, principal private secretary | |
| 209 | 23 August 2024 | 2012 Paralympics | Sarah Storey, cyclist; Hannah Cockroft, racer; Naomi Riches, rower; Oliver Hynd, swimmer; Ade Adepitan, basketball player; Jenny Sealey, Bradley Hemmings, | |
| 210 | 1 September 2024 | Clutha Helicopter Crash | Mary Kavanagh, Robert Jenkin, Nancy Primrose, Jim Murphy, shadow secretary of state; Alan Crossan, Patrick O'Meara, | |
| 211 | 8 September 2024 | Fall of the Berlin Wall | Harald Jäger, border guard who opened the gate; Jens Reich, an opposition leader; Daniela Dahn, a critic of the reunification process | |
