= Peter Jones =

Peter Jones or Pete Jones may refer to:

== Arts and entertainment ==
- Peter Jones (actor) (1920–2000), English actor
- Peter Jones (journalist) (1930–2015), British entertainment journalist and author
- Peter Andrew Jones (born 1951), British artist and illustrator
- Pete Jones (bassist) (born 1957), English bass player for Public Image Ltd
- Peter Jones (drummer) (1963–2012), English musician, member of Crowded House
- Peter Jones (British musician) (born 1980), British musician and radio presenter
- Pete Jones (director) (fl. 2002), writer and director of Stolen Summer and Outing Riley
- Peter P. Jones, American photographer and filmmaker
- Peter Penry-Jones (1938–2009), Welsh actor, born in Cardiff

== Business and industry ==
- Peter Rees Jones (1843–1905), Welsh businessman, founder of Peter Jones department store
- Peter Emerson Jones (born 1935), British property developer
- Peter Jones (entrepreneur) (born 1966), British entrepreneur, founder of Phones International; star of BBC TV series Dragons' Den and judge on ABC's American Inventor

== Politics and law ==
- Peter Cushman Jones (1837–1922), Hawaiian politician
- Peter K. Jones (1834–1895), American politician in Virginia
- Peter Jones (Australian politician) (1933–2017), Australian politician in Western Australia
- Peter Lawson Jones (born 1952), American politician in Ohio

== Science and medicine ==
- Peter Jones (surgeon) (1917–1984), British surgeon
- Peter Jones (paediatrician) (born 1937), British paediatrician
- Peter Jones (mathematician) (born 1952), American mathematician

== Sports ==
=== Association football (soccer) ===
- Peter Jones (footballer, born 1937), English footballer
- Peter Jones (footballer, born 1949), English footballer for Burnley and Swansea City
- Peter Jones (referee) (born 1954), English football referee

=== Rugby ===
- Peter Jones (rugby union, born 1932) (1932–1994), New Zealand international rugby union player
- Peter Jones (rugby union, born 1963), Scotland international rugby union player
- Peter Jones (rugby, born 1942), Australian rugby league and rugby union player
- Peter Jones (rugby league, born 1972), Australian rugby league player

=== Other sports ===
- Pete Jones (baseball) (Thomas Everett Jones, 1919–1992), American baseball player
- Peter Jones (broadcaster) (1930–1990), Welsh broadcaster, BBC radio sports commentator
- Peter Jones (cricketer, born 1935) (1935–2007), English cricketer, played for Kent and Suffolk
- Peter Jones (Australian rules footballer) (born 1946), Australian rules footballer for Carlton
- Peter Jones (cricketer, born 1948) (1948–2017), Rhodesian first-class cricketer for Oxford University

== Military ==
- Peter Jones (British Army officer) (1919–2015)
- Peter Jones (admiral) (born 1957), Royal Australian Navy officer

== Religious ==
- Peter Jones (missionary) (1802–1856), Mississauga Ojibwa Methodist minister, chief and missionary
- Peter Owen-Jones (born 1957), English Anglican clergyman, author and television presenter

== Others ==
- Peter Jones (classicist) (born 1942), British classicist, writer, journalist and broadcaster
- Peter Edmund Jones (1843–1909), Indian agent and chief of New Credit, Ontario
- Peter Blundell Jones (1949–2016), British architect
- Peter M. Jones, British professor of French history

== Other uses ==
- Peter Jones (department store), English retail establishment
