= Nathan Mahl =

Canadian progressive rock band

- Origin: Ottawa, Ontario, Canada
- Genres: Progressive rock, jazz fusion
- Years active: 1981–present
- Labels: Unicorn Digital, Mahl Productions, NEARfest Records, Musea Records
- Members: Donald Prince; Tristan Vaillancourt; David Campbell
- Past members: Guy LeBlanc; Marc Spénard; Dan Lacasse; Garth Boyd; Alain Paluck; Claude Prince; Alain Bergeron; Luc Poulin; Scott Daughtrey; José Bergeron; Guy Dagenais; J.P. Ranger; Aaron Clark
- Website: Nathan Mahl Official Website

Nathan Mahl are a Canadian progressive rock band with jazz fusion elements formed in Ottawa, Ontario. Throughout a constantly evolving lineup of rock and fusion musicians from the Ottawa and Gatineau regions, keyboardist Guy LeBlanc (1960–2015) was widely regarded as the essence and constant of the band.

Guy appears to be more widely known as the keyboardist for Progressive Rock Legends Camel since 2000. Recording and touring resulted in A Nod and a Wink and The Paris Collection (Live).

They have released numerous concept-based CDs to critical acclaim, including Shadows Unbound, and the Heretik Trilogy. Furthermore, they have played several prestigious music festivals including NEARfest, and FMPM.

== History ==
=== Beginnings (1981–1984) ===
Nathan Mahl originally formed in Dec. 1981. The first version was formed when Guy LeBlanc, Donald Prince and Mark Spénard, who had played together in the band Delerium, recruited Dan Lacasse. It is said that during one night in early 1982, while the band was on an excursion in the Gatineau National Park, the name took on its final form and the seed was planted.

This first line-up went on to compose and record their first LP Parallel Eccentricities, in December 1982 releasing it in the Spring of 1983. It seems that 1983 was the busiest for Mahl, as they rehearsed full-time and gigged arguably almost as often. During that summer, they entered a band contest and performed in the finals of the Ottawa classic rock radio station Chez-106 (Sharechez '83), apparently blowing the roof off Barrymore's Music Hall. Some time in late 1983, Dan Lacasse left the group and was replaced by Wayne Palmer till Feb. 27, 1984. This was when Guy, for personal reasons, disbanded the group.

=== Interim (1986–1997) ===
In 1986, the band was shortly reformed as a trio (LeBlanc, Lacasse, Prince). Four new songs were written and recorded, but never released. Again in 1989, this time with second keyboardist Garth Boyd and without guitar, a seemingly more fusion Nathan Mahl ended the decade. Once again five new songs with this line-up were recorded but not released. The decade ended with Lacasse and Prince both leaving the group.

The 90s began with a new rhythm section: Alain Paluck as drummer, Claude Prince on bass, joining LeBlanc and Boyd (the duelling keys). Many new songs were composed and rehearsed, but only rehearsals were ever recorded with this line-up. It was at this time that Guy decided to create the Mahl Dynasty improv project.

This particular project seemed to have brought about the quiet demise of that line-up of Nathan Mahl. Still trying to revive the band, in 1994, Guy auditioned drummers and bassists. This was when Alain Bergeron and Luc Poulin joined. Shortly after that, guitarist Scott Daughtrey completed the quartet. This line-up recorded quite a bit of material, culminating in the disc Radio Rehab, which was not released because Guy was apparently not entirely pleased with the final product. Some of the songs from that disc have been released by others (PMS and the Progday Support disc 2005). In 1996, Daughtrey and Poulin left and were briefly replaced by what appears to have been a revolving door system of line-ups.

The original Parallel Eccentricities was released on cd in 1997 (and included a comprehensive interactive cdrom supplement) by Mahl Productions, a label founded by Guy and his wife Dawn Mitchell.

=== Breakthrough (1998–1999) ===
Eventually, Donald Prince rejoined and suggested José Bergeron as guitarist. When Donald quit the group again, he was immediately replaced by brother Claude (again). This line-up became arguably the second most prolific Nathan Mahl. It was the suggestion of José Bergeron to record in a studio where he had bartered his talent as session guitarist in exchange for studio time, making it possible for the band to create the Clever use of Shadows in 1998. However, the strain of recording over eight months in a piecemeal fashion, and the necessity of Guy adding to the barter of session playing for the balance of the studio time, seems to have taken its toll on this line-up.

In January 1999, Mahl Productions released Nathan Mahl's the Clever use of Shadows, and although this disc found a new audience for Mahl, Guy decided to remove the title from the catalogue in 2001, specifically due to what appears to be a long-standing disagreement with his co-producer for this disc.

The month of May 1999 saw the band being invited to play at the first NEARfest, as a last minute replacement for the defunct Finneus Gauge] On June 28, 1999, Nathan Mahl took the stage at NEARfest, and many have suggested they blew the roof off the venue. One week later, they played their final gig at Ottawa U. Later in December 2003, NEARfest Records released the recording of Nathan Mahl's set at NEARfest 1999.

=== Heretik (2000–2002) ===
The 1990s ended with the return of Mark Spénard (on guitars) to the fold. After a most interesting turn of events later in 1999 (including a solo disc for Guy and his joining Camel] in early 2000), the new Millennium saw the release of the band's next opus -Heretik: Volume I - Body of Accusations with a seemingly heavier sound. It might be suggested that it is musically a return to the proggier side of Mahl (with less fusion). However, the fact that Mahl had become more of a studio band may have to Alain Bergeron's decision to leave the group at the outset of Volume 1.

This was followed in June 2001 with the second instalment of the trilogy. At this point Dan Lacasse accepted the invitation to return to the group. American author Michael McCormack (whom Guy had met while on his first tour with Camel) wanted to make Guy and Mahl the subject of his next novel, so he travelled to Ottawa and wrote of this experience while the band was recording Heretik: volume II - the Trial. This book is called "the People wish to be Deceived…". This time it was Claude Prince who left the group at the outset of Volume 2.

The band continued its re-evolution with Heretik: Volume III - the Sentence, first by welcoming Guy "Geezer" Dagenais (whom Dan had met at a jam session) on bass. Volume 3 contains only one 54-minute song, and was released on May 3, 2002. Shortly after its release, Dagenais amicably left the group, since it was still only a studio project.

=== Unbound (2003–2006) ===
LeBlanc decided to take a few steps backwards and revisit the Shadows experience. This time however, he had the agreement of all the original members (including Don Prince on bass) to participate in this project. After all, this was a totally different line-up than the one recorded in 1999. In addition, half of the album features songs never before released.

On February 20, 2003, Nathan Mahl released Shadows Unbound. The disc also features J.P. Ranger on lead vocals. Ranger is an old friend of Mahl, and had briefly joined the band in 1983, making it possible for them to tackle some of the juicier prog classic covers they did at the time.

The rest of 2003 seemed to be a veritable trial by fire. LeBlanc had to quit Camel on the eve of their Farewell Tour because his partner had a series of heart attacks in April. Whilst caring for her, he produced his second solo disc. A little later in the year, the band was invited to produce the opening 25-minute song for a 9 band collaboration based on Homer's Odyssey. Guy composed the piece, and presented it to the band, and all were on board for the project.

In 2004 production seemed pretty much on schedule; however, Don Prince contacted LeBlanc and quit the band due to other musical commitments, and is replaced by Luc Poulin for about 2 days. Since the original agreement for this project was that each band member create his own parts for the song (to be different this time), and that the deadline for submission to the label was getting very close, Guy LeBlanc borrowed a bass guitar, taught himself to play it, wrote the bass part and recorded it in 2 weeks time (thereby making the deadline). The Odyssey was released in September 2005 by Musea Records.

2005 seemed an exciting time for the band and their fans. LeBlanc showed a strong desire to perform again (and so did Lacasse and Spénard). As a result, possibly, Guy Dagenais returned to the fold. Also, LeBlanc sensed that this lineup could perform some of their possibly more difficult songs from their discography. He approached Alain Bergeron with the idea of having a second keyboardist/percussionist etc. on board (Alain appears to be quite the multi-instrumentalist). And so for most of 2005, Mahl was a quintet, and it was this quintet that performed in Lowell MA on September 9, and Prog-in-the-Park in Rochester NY on the 10th.

In 2006, Nathan Mahl had settled on being a quartet (Alain Bergeron left seemingly to pursue a solo cd). The setlist now included more "older and newer" songs. Mahl performed in Ottawa for the first time since 1999, on May 20, and again at Progtoberfest on October 14. An official performance DVD Live & Unbound 2006 of the entire setlist is in the works. Yet as it often seems to happen with musical differences, both Marc Spénard and Dan Lacasse left soon thereafter.

=== Exodus (2007–present) ===
In early 2007, with the prospect of playing the Montreal progressive rock festival FMPM,) Guy LeBlanc contacted Alain Bergeron to return on Drums. Guy Dagenais contacted Tristan Vaillancourt to join on guitar having see him play with his previous band, Widow's Walk. Tristan seems to have integrated well into the band's style, as well as adding renewed versatility and harder edge to its sound. The new lineup played FMPM on September 16 at FMPM, with a large portion of their set being new material.

Aiming for release in the Summer of 2008, they are currently finishing their new CD, Exodus: Then. Guy LeBlanc has been in negotiations with Quebec label Unicorn Digital for its subsequent release. The concept is loosely based on the Exodus book in the Bible. They each made a conscious decision to record in his own respective home studio. Also in the works, is another possible DVD, with the documentary focus on behind the scenes at FMPM 2007 and at Exodus recording sessions. They plan on eventually making a follow-up Exodus: Now, taking the exodus concept to the present day. Whereas vocals were previously kept to a minimum, vocals are now used extensively to better convey the theme. Dagenais makes his Mahl vocal debut sharing much of the singing duties with LeBlanc.

After a lengthy mixing process, Tristan left the band for personal reasons. Exodus was finally released in December 2008 through Unicorn Digital. Just prior to this, David Campbell joins the band on guitar. This should prove to be an interesting choice as David is a seasoned Jazz guitarist, as well as the composer and leader in his own progressive rock band, The Rebel Wheel with whom Alain Bergeron was at one time their drummer.

Also released in 2008 was Mahl's contribution to the latest mega project by Colossus, based on Dante's Inferno, and brought to you once again by the Finnish Progressive Rock Society and Musea Records. Mahl are slatted to contribute a 7-minute piece, alongside 35 other current progressive rock bands. This is their 2nd time participating in such a project –the first time being The Odyssey in 2005.

2009 saw the return of Nathan Mahl to Progtoberfest, which was held on October 24 at Carleton University and also included Orco Muto featuring Maurizio Guarini keyboardist of the legendary Goblin.

In early 2010, the band line-up changed and production of Justify stalled for over a year as Guy LeBlanc moved from Ottawa to Kemptville. Once established, he resumed work on Justify, contacting and recruiting Tristan Vaillancourt, David Campbell and original member Don Prince to play on it. He even recruited drummer Aaron Clark, but due to scheduling and technical problems, wound up playing the drums on the album himself.

After returning to Europe in late 2013 for a short reunion tour with Camel, LeBlanc wrapped up the mix of Justify and was fortunate to have Andy Latimer contribute a guitar solo to the last song on the disc.

Justify will be officially released on June 1, 2014.

Core member Guy LeBlanc died of cancer on April 27, 2015.

== Discography ==
=== Parallel Eccentricities (1983) ===
In 1983, Nathan Mahl released their first LP - Parallel Eccentricities. The disc seems to have become a highly collectible classic in the Prog-Rock community of fans. The 1997 CD version of this disc was released with an interactive CD-ROM supplement history of Nathan Mahl and contains photos, audio and video archive footage from the original lineup.

==== Track listing ====
Side one

1. "Moral Values (Part 1)" – (Guy LeBlanc)
2. "SlowBurn" – (LeBlanc)

Side two

1. "Orgasmik Outburst (Part 3)" – (LeBlanc)
2. "Schizophrenia" – (LeBlanc, Don Prince)
3. "No Vacancy" – (LeBlanc, Dan Lane)

Personnel

- Marc Spénard – guitars, lead vocals
- Guy LeBlanc – piano, backing vocals, organ, synthesizer
- Don Prince – bass, backing vocals
- Dan Lane – drums, backing vocals

=== Mahl Dynasty - Borderline (1991) ===
In 1991, while no new Nathan Mahl discs were coming to fruition, Guy LeBlanc decided to record and release a series of improvisations performed by a duet of 2 drummers and himself. Since this was not a band effort, he also decided to call this the Mahl Dynasty (instead of Nathan Mahl). 15 improvisations lasting a total 71 minutes.

Songs:

1. Spasmodik
2. the Promise
3. Traffic Jam
4. Window Shopping
5. Famous Quirks
6. Leave it to the Scots
7. Endangered Species
8. Downhill no Breaks
9. Quasimodo's day off
10. Just Stalling
11. Nessie's Driving Lesson
12. the Beach at Midnite
13. Orif the Glum
14. How can you explain this to people?
15. Bomb Shelter Blues

=== The Clever Use of Shadows (1998) ===
Nathan Mahl return after a long absence. This CD has been discontinued; nevertheless, most of the songs have been re-recorded on Shadows Unbound in 2003.

==== Track listing ====
All lyrics and music by Guy LeBlanc, except where noted.

1. "Without Words" – 9:50
2. "Clever Use of Shadows" – 10:20
3. "Orgasmik Outburst II" – 2:42
4. "Machiavélique" – (music: José Bergeron) – 6:41
5. "Beyond the Rims of Despair" – 9:16
6. "Something Like That" – (music: Bergeron) – 8:23
7. "The Rubber Cage" – (lyrics: LeBlanc, Bergeron; music: Bergeron, Sylvain Cormier) – 5:51
8. "Call To Arms" – 9:08

Personnel

- José Bergeron – guitar, vocals, effects
- Guy LeBlanc – keyboards, vocals, percussion
- Claude Prince – 4- and 5-string basses
- Alain Bergeron – drums, percussion
- Paul Desgagné – alto and tenor saxophones (tracks 5, 7)

=== Heretik Volume I: Body of Accusations (2000) ===
Nathan Mahl returns a heavier sound. A man has been arrested and is being detained, awaiting a trial for crimes against society. Musically, this is a return to the proggier side of Mahl (less fusion).

Songs:

1. When all was Well
2. Heretik part 1
3. Heretik part 2
4. Crimen Excepta
5. Heretik part 3
6. Carpe Diem

=== Heretik Volume II: The Trial (2001) ===
The saga continues... the trial of the heathen heretic unfolds. The outcome of this miscarriage of justice is already known to the judges, but the accused is only now becoming aware of the fact that his fate was sealed even before his arrest. Musically, the plot unravels with dark and ominous themes. Emphasis is on the crushing pace and impending doom.

Songs:

1. Entrance of the Judges
2. Malleus Maleficarum
3. De Praestigiis Daemonum
4. Heretik part IV
5. Ad Judicium
6. Moral Values part II

=== Heretik Volume III: The Sentence (2002) ===
The story comes to an end, apparently in a mean and nasty way. A single, mostly instrumental, 54 minute piece of music seals the protagonist's fate, and the judges have a field day. Possibly, an overwhelming intrusion on the senses...

Song:

1. De Mortuis Nil Nisi Bonum (of the Dead, speak nothing but good)

=== Shadows Unbound (2003) ===
Nathan Mahl presents a set of compositions that continues their tradition of aggressive symphonic-rock music laced with complex jazz-rock stylings. And for the first time since 1983, the original lineup of Guy LeBlanc, Mark Spénard, Dan Lacasse and Don Prince are joined by JP Ranger on Vocals.

==== Track listing ====
1. "Without Words" — 9:56
2. "Between Here And There" – 5:40
3. "Shadows Unbound" – 9:48
4. "Funkface" – 6:06
5. "Beyond The Rims Of Despair" – 9:14
6. "Scumsucking Parasites" – 4:06
7. "Misleading Agenda" – 9:48
8. "A Call To Arms" – 10:16

Personnel

- Jean-Pierre Ranger — lead vocals, bass pedals
- Mark Spénard — Vox and Stratocaster guitars, backing vocals
- Guy LeBlanc — Hammond organ, backing vocals, Moog and Korg syntehsizers, Hohner clavinet, acoustic and Fender Rhodes pianos, recorder
- Don Prince — 4- and 6-string fretted and fretless Status basses
- Dan Lacasse — Roland V-drums, percussion

=== Live at NEARfest 1999 (2003) ===
Mahl's breakthrough set at NEARfest's inaugural 1st year.

Songs:

1. Intro
2. Without Words
3. Clever Use of Shadows
4. Something Like That
5. Machiavelique
6. Orgazmic Outburst II
7. Orgazmic Outburst III
8. Carpe Diem
9. Call to Arms

=== Exodus (2008) ===
Nathan Mahl's concept album Exodus, loosely based on the book in the Bible.

Songs:

1. Burning Bush
2. Let My People Go
3. The Plagues
4. The Parting
5. Down from the Mountain
6. 40 Years
7. The Last Climb
8. Canaan
9. Zipporah's Farewell
10. The Price of Freedom

=== Justify (2014) ===
For Nathan Mahl's Justify, bandleader Guy LeBlanc has recruited his most trusted and reliable collaborators to record seven new songs that explore Good and Evil, and the best way to tell the difference.

Songs:

1. Tantrik Kobbler
2. Deception
3. It Tolls for Thee
4. Spirit
5. Ballad of an Angry Man
6. Justify
7. Infinite Light

== Additional tracks ==
=== ProgDay Kinections - The ProgDay Support CD (2005) ===
Previously unreleased track to this benefit CD.

- The Place We Call Home

=== The Odyssey (2005) ===
24 minute epic as part of a 9 band progressive rock ode to Homer's Odyssey, "The Greatest Tale".

- Of Longings, Suitors, Deities and Quests...

=== Inferno (2008) ===
Gentle ballad as part of a 36 band progressive rock ode to Dante's Inferno.

- the Comfort of Tears

== Book ==
Published in 2001, the book The People wish to be Deceived..., is a 144-page book by American writer Michael McCormack subtitled Guy LeBlanc and The Making of Heretik Volume II The Trial. Much more than a behind-the-scenes look at the making of one album, the book is more generally about creating and recording progressive rock in the present climate and the philosophies underlying the Heretik trilogy.
