= A Live Record =

Live album by Camel
- Released: April 1978
- Recorded: 30 October 1974; 17 October 1975; 14 April 1976; 2 October 1977; 3 October 1977; 30 October 1977
- Venue: The Marquee Club (London); The Royal Albert Hall (London); Hammersmith Odeon (London); Colston Hall (Bristol); Leeds University (Leeds)
- Genre: Progressive rock
- Length: 97:14 (original release); 138:06 (2002 expanded and remastered edition)
- Label: Decca (original release and second reissue); Deram (first reissue)
- Producer: Rhett Davies; Camel

Camel live albums chronology
A Live Record (1978)	Pressure Points: Live in Concert (1984)

Professional ratings
Review scores
Source	Rating
AllMusic	4/5 stars
SputnikMusic	4/5 stars

A Live Record is the debut live album by the English progressive rock band Camel, released in April 1978. It is a double LP, composed of recordings from three different tours.

LP one features recordings from the Mirage tour in 1974, and the Rain Dances tour, in 1977. Tracks 1–4 on the LP are from the Rain Dances tour and 5–6 are from the Mirage tour.

LP 2 features the original line-up all the way, and is devoted to a complete performance of the band's instrumental concept album, The Snow Goose, during the tour for the album in 1975, performed with the London Symphony Orchestra as conducted by David Bedford at the Royal Albert Hall, London, October 1975. The remastered edition released in 2002 contains seven additional tracks not released originally and the tracks in a different order.

== Track listing ==
=== 1978 edition ===
LP one: Side A

1. "Never Let Go" (Andrew Latimer) – 7:29
  - Recorded at the Hammersmith Odeon, London, October 1977.
2. "Song Within a Song" (Peter Bardens, Latimer) – 7:09
  - Recorded at the Hammersmith Odeon, London, September 1977.
3. "Lunar Sea" (Bardens, Latimer) – 9:01
  - Recorded at the Colston Hall, Bristol, October 1977.

LP one: Side B

1. "Skylines" (Bardens, Latimer, Andy Ward) – 5:43
  - Recorded at Leeds University, October 1977.
2. "Ligging at Louis' " (Bardens) – 6:39
3. "Lady Fantasy: Encounter/Smiles for You/Lady Fantasy" (Bardens, Doug Ferguson, Latimer, Ward) – 14:27
  - The above two tracks were recorded at the Marquee, London, October 1974.

LP two: Side C

1. "The Great Marsh" (Bardens, Latimer) – 1:45
2. "Rhayader" (Bardens, Latimer) – 3:08
3. "Rhayader Goes to Town" (Bardens, Latimer) – 5:12
4. "Sanctuary" (Latimer) – 1:10
5. "Fritha" (Latimer) – 1:22
6. "The Snow Goose" (Bardens, Latimer) – 3:03
7. "Friendship" (Bardens, Latimer) – 1:39
8. "Migration" (Latimer) – 3:52
9. "Rhayader Alone" (Latimer) – 1:48
  - All songs recorded at the Royal Albert Hall, London, October 1975.

LP two: Side D

1. "Flight of the Snow Goose" (Bardens, Latimer) – 2:59
2. "Preparation" (Latimer) – 4:11
3. "Dunkirk" (Bardens, Latimer) – 5:28
4. "Epitaph" (Latimer) – 2:34
5. "Fritha Alone" (Latimer) – 1:24
6. "La Princesse Perdue" (Latimer) – 4:44
7. "The Great Marsh (Reprise)" (Bardens, Latimer) – 2:27
  - All songs recorded at the Royal Albert Hall, London, October 1975.

=== 2002 CD edition ===
Disc one

1. "First Light" – 5:27 (previously unreleased)
2. "Metrognome" – 4:23 (previously unreleased)
3. "Unevensong" – 5:36 (previously unreleased)
4. "Skylines" – 5:43
5. "A Song Within a Song" – 7:09
6. "Lunar Sea" – 9:01
7. "Rain Dances" – 2:33 (previously unreleased)
8. "Never Let Go" – 7:29
9. "Chord Change" – 6:52 (previously unreleased)
10. "Ligging at Louis' " – 6:39
11. "Lady Fantasy: Encounter/Smiles for You/Lady Fantasy" – 14:27
  - 1–3 & 6–8 recorded at the Colston Hall, Bristol, 2 October 1977.
  - 4 recorded at Leeds University, 3 October 1977.
  - 5 recorded at the Hammersmith Odeon, London, 30 October 1977.
  - 9 recorded at the Hammersmith Odeon, London, 14 April 1976.
  - 10 & 11 recorded at the Marquee, London, 30 October 1974.

Disc two

1. "Spoken Introduction by Peter Bardens" – 1:10
2. "The Great Marsh" – 1:45
3. "Rhayader" – 3:08
4. "Rhayader Goes to Town" – 5:12
5. "Sanctuary" – 1:10
6. "Fritha" – 1:22
7. "The Snow Goose" – 3:03
8. "Friendship" – 1:39
9. "Migration" – 3:52
10. "Rhayader Alone" – 1:48
11. "Flight of the Snow Goose" – 2:59
12. "Preparation" – 4:11
13. "Dunkirk" – 5:28
14. "Epitaph" – 2:34
15. "Fritha Alone" – 1:24
16. "La Princesse Perdue" – 4:44
17. "The Great Marsh (Reprise)" – 2:27
18. "The White Rider" – 8:48 (previously unreleased)
19. "Another Night" – 6:35 (previously unreleased)
  - 1–17 recorded at the Royal Albert Hall, London, 17 October 1975.
  - 18 & 19 recorded at the Hammersmith Odeon, London, 14 April 1976.

== Personnel ==
- Andrew Latimer – guitar, flute, vocals
- Peter Bardens – keyboards
- Doug Ferguson – bass (LP one: 5, 6 / LP two)
- Richard Sinclair – bass, vocals (LP one: 1, 2, 3, 4)
- Andy Ward – drums, percussion
- Mel Collins – saxophones, flute (LP one: 1, 2, 3, 4)
- London Symphony Orchestra (LP two)
- David Bedford – conducting (LP two)

== Charts ==
Chart performance for A Live Record
Chart (1978)	Peak position
German Albums (Offizielle Top 100)	34

Chart (2025)	Peak position
Greek Albums (IFPI)	57
