= British Pregnancy Advisory Service =

Organization

The British Pregnancy Advisory Service (BPAS) is a British charity whose stated purpose is to avoid unwanted pregnancy by advocating and providing high quality, affordable services to prevent or end unwanted pregnancies with contraception or by abortion.

== Origin ==
BPAS was founded in Birmingham, England in 1968 by Diane Munday and others as the Birmingham Pregnancy Advisory Service. On the day that the Abortion Act 1967 came into force, Saturday 27 April 1968, the first patients had their consultations in the front room of the then chairman, Dr Martin Cole. At that time, patients had to travel to London for termination but a clinic was opened in Birmingham 18 months later.

== Abortion ==
In addition to providing abortion counselling and treatment at over 40 centres across England, Wales and Scotland (over 93% of clients have their abortion treatment funded by the NHS), BPAS also provides emergency contraception, vasectomy and sterilisation, and vasectomy reversal services. BPAS's South London Clinic was one of the first recipients of the Department of Health 'You're Welcome' award in March 2009, for providing high standards of health care to young people.

BPAS gained substantial media attention in early 2011, when the charity went to the High Court seeking a legal re-definition of 'treatment' under the terms of the Abortion Act, which would have enabled women to have administered the second drug used in the 'abortion pill' treatment in their own homes. BPAS argued that such a change would have brought UK practice into line with best clinical practice, and with practice in countries such as the US, Sweden, and France; and that it would have dramatically improved the experience of early medical abortion for women. The judge in this case did not accept the definition of 'treatment' proposed by BPAS, but confirmed that the Secretary of State for Health has the power to approve women's homes as a 'class of place' where certain abortion drugs could be taken.

In 2008 BPAS, along with other organisations in the Voice for Choice network, called for improvements to the abortion law during the Parliamentary debate over the Human Fertilisation and Embryology (HFE) Bill. The government guillotined discussion of the HFE Bill in such a way that proposed clauses related to abortion could not be debated.

== Donor insemination ==
From the early 1980s BPAS carried out donor insemination initially using fresh sperm which was produced by donors at the required time of insemination. Sperm donation treatments provided by BPAS were anonymous and the identity of donors was protected. In the mid-1980s, following concerns about HIV, sperm which had been frozen and thawed by BPAS was used instead of fresh sperm. This enabled it to be quarantined and the donors retested. BPAS was known to be a clinic which would provide donor insemination to lesbians.

BPAS continued to store donor sperm and to carry out treatments until the Human Fertilisation and Embryology Authority (HFEA) came into being in 1993.

Although it never carried out treatments under the Human Fertilisation and Embryology Act, the BPAS held a storage licence until the end of 1997.

In central London, the Pregnancy Advisory Service (PAS), also carried out treatments using donor sperm (vaginal inseminations in which the donor's semen is deposited at the entrance to the cervix, technically known as intracervical insemination) before the passing of the Act. Established primarily to facilitate abortions after 1968 with a clinic in Rosslyn Road, Twickenham and premises in Fitzroy Square, London, this organisation operated a donor insemination service from its premises at 11 to 13 Charlotte Street, London W1. PAS held a treatment licence under the Act establishing the HFEA and continued to carry out artificial inseminations under its auspices. Unusually at the time, PAS operated a 'non-discrimination policy' which resulted in most of the patients of the PAS Donor Insemination Service being women without a male partner i.e. single women or female couples.

PAS never achieved high pregnancy rates with its donor insemination service, its average pregnancy rate being less than 8%. With a few donors it did reach rates of nearly 13% but with most donors the rate was considerably less. The reason for these low success rates was largely due to the method of fertilisation used.

In 1996 PAS risked insolvency and merged with the BPAS. It ceased treatments in early 1997. The clinic at Charlotte Street continued to collect and process sperm samples from donors until November of that year. The BPAS sold the client list of PAS to the London Women's Clinic (LWC) in 1997. This comprised the names of mainly female couples and single women and from that date the LWC adopted an open policy for 'choice mothers' (women without a male partner). From January 1998 for a short time the LWC operated a donor insemination clinic known as the 'Charlotte Unit' and some of the former donors from PAS transferred there. However, LWC did not perform ICI inseminations, so in compliance with general directions issued by HFEA which covered such cases at the time, the BPAS sold its remaining stored donor sperm and that of PAS to fertility clinics outside the UK for use in donor treatments. The outcome of those treatments abroad is now the subject of speculation by donors who are aware that UK limits on offspring did not apply once the vials had left the UK.

== Criticism ==
In late 2004, the British newspaper The Daily Telegraph presented a video to the British government (Health Secretary Dr John Reid and Chief Medical Officer Professor Sir Liam Donaldson) showing BPAS counsellors referring women whose pregnancies were too advanced for legal abortions in Britain (past 24 weeks) to a clinic in Barcelona, Spain. A report filed by the Chief Medical Officer for England, Professor Sir Liam Donaldson, in September, 2005 was critical of some aspects of BPAS counselling, but concluded that, in the matter of BPAS staff referring (in the broad sense, not the strict medical definition) women with late-term pregnancies to the Ginemedex clinic, BPAS had not broken any laws. The report stated unequivocally that BPAS's ability to provide abortion and reproductive counselling and services (within its mandate) had not in any way been compromised, and that no changes in funding should result. It further stated however, that protocol for late-term abortion counselling was sorely lacking, and that the government and interested agencies must develop said protocol with all possible speed.

== See also ==
- Abortion
- Reproductive health
- Sperm donation
- The Heather Trickey Essay Prize
