= Diane Munday =

British political activist (1931–2026)

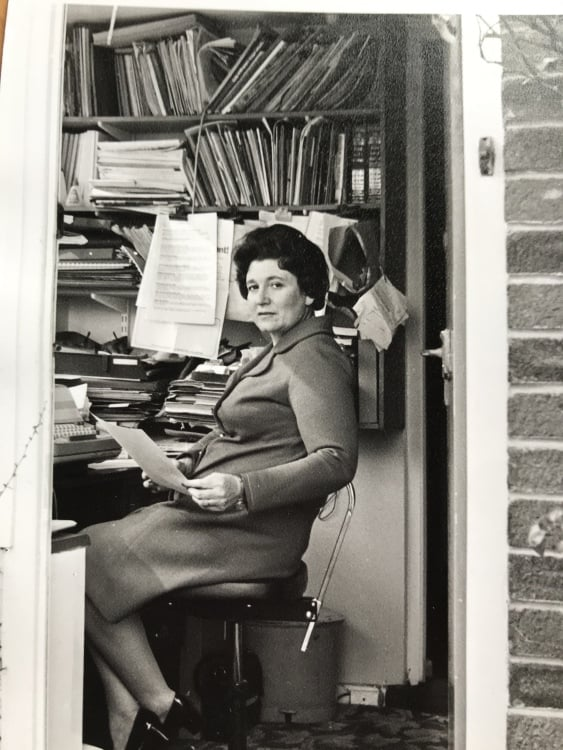
- Born: Diane Schieferstein; March 1931; London, England
- Died: 9 January 2026 (aged 94)
- Known for: Helping to pass the Abortion Act 1967; Patron of Humanists UK

Diane Munday (née Schieferstein; March 1931 – 9 January 2026) was a British political activist who, as a leading member of the Abortion Law Reform Association (ALRA) from 1962 until 1974, played a prominent role in the decriminalisation of abortion in the United Kingdom with the Abortion Act 1967. She was also a co-founder of the British Pregnancy Advisory Service and a patron of Humanists UK, which she joined in the 1950s and of which she was an Executive Committee member in the 1960s and 1970s.

== Background ==
Diane Schieferstein was born in east London in March 1931 to a Jewish family. Her mother was "believing but not practicing" and from an early age Diane became attracted to a humanist worldview. She cited Thomas Huxley and Charles Darwin as early intellectual influences in this direction. She worked at St Bartholomew’s Hospital in the City of London as a laboratory researcher. Schieferstein married Derek Bradlaugh Munday (24 August 1930— April 1996) in December 1954 in East Ham and, by her late twenties, had three children under the ages of four-years old.

Munday said that when she was pregnant with her third child, she was prescribed thalidomide to combat sleeplessness, but did not take it. Soon after the thalidomide scandal broke, where babies were being born with disabilities, due to their mothers taking thalidomide. Thinking that she would have wanted to have had an abortion if she was carrying a disabled child, she joined the Abortion Law Reform Association (previously moribund, but receiving a boost in the aftermath of the scandal). She fell pregnant again in 1961 and decided to have an abortion; at the time this was a criminal offence in the United Kingdom, contrary to the Offences Against the Person Act 1861. Because her family was relatively wealthy, she did not have a backstreet abortion, but was able to pay for one after visiting a consultant gynaecologist at Harley Street, after a psychiatrist said that her "mental health was so damaged by the pregnancy" that her "life was endangered".

Munday died on 9 January 2026, at the age of 94.

== ALRA and the Abortion Act 1967 ==
Following her abortion experience, Munday became more active and vocal within the Abortion Law Reform Association (ALRA). This organisation had been founded in the 1930s but had not achieved its initial aims among its first generation of activists, being most active just before the outbreak of the Second World War. At the next annual general meeting of the ALRA, Munday met Madeleine Simms, an associate of the Fabian Society (as the editor of Fabian News) and fellow humanist, who shared her Jewish background, and together they would go on to become two of the most prominent faces of the ALRA. At a time when the few women who did have abortions kept such information private, Munday openly discussed her abortion at public-speaking events, on television and on radio interviews, breaking a social taboo. Munday's public activism did not always garner a positive response: the local greengrocers in the village refused her service, seeing her money as "tainted". She has also stated that she was targeted in a number of direct action episodes: her car was allegedly covered in red paint along with a note stating, “This is the blood of the baby you murdered” and she has also stated that she constantly received late-night calls, one with the sound a child crying and a voice saying “Mama? You murdered me.” In 1963, Vera Houghton (wife of Douglas Houghton) became Chair of the ALRA and Diane Munday the vice-chair. During this time period, Houghton doubled up as the Vice President of the British Eugenics Society (later known as the Galton Institute) from 1964 to 1966, while her husband was a notable within the Fabian Society, who, in 1967 would become Chairman of the Parliamentary Labour Party.

With the ascent of the Labour government in 1964 and the appointment of Harold Wilson as the Prime Minister, the ALRA sent a delegation to Frank Soskice, the new Home Secretary, requesting a change to the abortion law. However, at the time, the Labour Party was not at all unanimously supportive of abortion (not least because a significant element of Labour's voter base in urban areas were working-class Catholic Irish diaspora who were strongly opposed to it, aside from a general taboo against abortion in society already) and the ALRA was told that this was a highly sensitive issue and that as there was no significant public demand, the government would not address it. Munday was told that the proposition was “too middle-class Hampstead” and that she had to prove demand from ordinary women. Thus, the ALRA decided to ramp up their campaign to manufacture a consensus and Munday personally targeted women's organisations, particularly "respectable" ones such as the National Council of Women of Great Britain (known to be fairly socially conservative) and over the space of a few years, Munday trained a network of women to address such meetings, which grew larger and larger, culminating in a meeting at the Free Trade Hall in Manchester.

The specific aim of the ALRA was to encourage the general public to lobby Members of Parliament to table an early day motion to amend the Offences Against the Person Act 1861, so that a pregnant women can request an abortion on demand (for any reason) and that this be provided by the National Health Service as a tax-payer funded fully legal service. The ALRA also sent out questionnaires to prospective Members of Parliament asking them if they would consider introducing a bill to change abortion law, if elected: one of the candidates who ticked "yes" was David Steel, a 28-year-old who was elected as an MP in 1965 for the Liberal Democrats.

The ALRA maintained some sympathisers within the Labour Party and thought they had a breakthrough in 1965 when Lord Lewis Silkin, 1st Baron Silkin agreed to table a private member's bill after a meeting with Munday, Vera Houghton, Glanville Williams and David Paintin. Silkin's proposals were more modest than the ALRA's full agenda, mainly being aimed at legal protection for doctors, extending abortion to victims of sexual assault and also excluding Northern Ireland from being included. Silkin's Medical Termination of Pregnancy Bills were debated, with Lord Dilhorne, Lord Denning and Lord Stonham, participating in the debate, questioning elements. The bill fell as the Wilson government, who had been elected with a tiny majority in 1964 called a snap election in 1966 and won in a landslide victory. In any case, there had been some disagreements between ALRA and Silkin about the scope of the bill, but they were confident of his support for a future bill and that their case was now growing. After preparing a second bill, Silkin agreed to step aside for Steel's private member bill instead.

A working party for the Bill was drawn up including Munday, Vera Houghton, Peter Diggory, Glanville Williams, David Paintin, Lord Silkin and the 12 MP sponsors (including Steel, Michael Winstanley, John Dunwoody and David Owen). Most of the wording was taken from the second Silkin Bill. Some amendments were made, but on the day the lobbying of Alastair Service, John Silkin (Lord Silkin's son), George Sinclair and Peter Jackson whipping MPs in favour of the Bill led to its success. As well as John Silkin, other key members of the Wilson government supported the Bill, including; Roy Jenkins, Kenneth Robinson and Richard Crossman. Some aspects of the Bill were changed to try and get the Church of England and Church of Scotland to back it, much to the dismay of Munday and the ALRA. Eventually, the ALRA decided to back the Bill as being better than nothing, and it passed into legislation as the Abortion Act 1967 after an all-night sitting on 27 October 1967.

Munday and the ALRA activists stayed up all night to see the Bill pass through the Houses of Parliament, sitting on Parliament terrace, overlooking the River Thames. When it passed, her colleagues were celebrating with champagne and strawberries, but she stated that "I only want half a glass because the job is only half done." Munday was disappointed with some key aspects of the Bill: firstly, Northern Ireland was excluded from its effects (it being popular with neither the Catholic or Protestant communities there) and some of the concessions made for it to pass were uncomfortable for her. Two doctors were required to sign off on an abortion, rather than it being simply abortion on demand, abortions had to be carried out at specific NHS facilities and the Offences Against the Person Act 1861 was not actually repealed but simply legislated over, meaning that abortion was still technically a criminal offense, though provided a legal defence for those who perform them.

== Other activities ==
Munday became the General Secretary of ALRA from 1970 and in 1974 she became a founding member, press and publicity officer for Birmingham Pregnancy Advisory Service (later the British Pregnancy Advisory Service).

Munday has had a long-term involvement with the ethical movement and its successor humanist movement. She joined the Ethical Union in the 1950s and was made part of its executive committee when it changed its name to the British Humanist Association under A. J. Ayer. During this time period, the Association was strongly associated with the push towards the "permissive society", successfully endorsing changing laws in relation to homosexuality, birth control, capital punishment, divorce and also abortion. Munday has publicly opposed the influence of Christianity on British society: during her tenure with the Abortion Law Reform Association (ALRA) posters associated with the campaign singled out by name "Roman Catholic" Members of Parliament (James Dunn and Norman St John-Stevas) who opposed changing the law and when she had an abortion in 1961, she complained that the working-class Catholic nurses on shift were not sympathetic to her having an abortion. Munday has argued against any kind of religious exemption for medical practitioners who do not want to participate in providing abortions, arguing that they should not be employed in health care. Diane Munday sat as a magistrate on the St Albans Bench until the retirement age, 70. Munday also clashed with the Church of England and after her eldest son was called a "pagan" at a local Anglican school, successfully campaigned for a state school in the village of Wheathampstead. Munday was also appointed a patron of Humanists UK (formerly the British Humanist Association). From 2000 until 2005, she was listed as the Director of the Rationalist Association and its affiliated Rationalist Press Association.

Munday has also been involved in lobbying in favour of voluntary euthanasia (and assisted suicide), being a carer for three people who wished to undergo euthanasia. She was involved in the Diane Pretty case, arguing against the result of the Pretty v United Kingdom case under the European Court of Human Rights which decided that the European Convention on Human Rights did not provide a "right to die" and that her husband could not hope to escape prosecution if he "assisted" in her death. Munday argued: "It is now legal to commit suicide in the UK: it is illegal to discriminate against the disabled. But in this scenario a person who is prevented from taking their own life as a direct consequence of their disability is clearly discriminated against in a most fundamental way."

== Filmography ==
- Abortion on Trial (2017)
- Kind to Women: How the 1967 Abortion Act Changed Our Lives (2017)
