= Woman (UK magazine) =

British weekly women's magazine

- Cover of 2 September 2024 issue
- Categories: mainstream women's weekly magazine
- Frequency: Weekly
- Circulation: 252,239 (ABC Jul – Dec 2013); Print and digital editions.
- Publisher: Sue Coffin
- Founded: 1937
- Company: Future plc
- Country: UK
- Language: English
- Website: www.womanandhome.com

Woman is a British weekly magazine launched in 1937. Its target audience is for 30-to 40-year-old women. It encompasses a mix of celebrity gossip and TV news, real-life stories, and fashion and beauty tips. Its lifestyle section offers ideas on homes, interiors and food, product reviews, and advice.

== History ==
Odhams Press founded the first colour weekly, Woman in 1937, for which it set up and operated a dedicated high-speed print works. Its first editor, Mary Grieve, led the magazine until 1962, and was awarded an OBE for services to journalism. She was asked with other editors to advise the government during World War II, on women's perspectives during the war, as well as ensuring that the magazine provided a range of fashion tips to cope with clothes rationing as well as recipes to deal with the shortages and alternatives. In August 1943, the recipes article focused on uses of "Household milk", which was how they referred to powdered milk.

During the 1970s, the magazine lost its top slot as a woman's magazine to Woman's Own. In 1982, Jane Reed who had led Woman's Own, became editor-in-Chief of Woman for a year.

Woman is published by Future plc. For the second half of 2013 the circulation of the magazine was 252,239 copies. In 2021, with more online options and 'women's' titles available, it had dropped down to 92,281.
