= Mary Grieve =

Scottish magazine editor and journalist (1906–1998)

Mary Grieve OBE
- Born: Mary Margaret Grieve; 11 April 1906; Ayr, Ayrshire, Scotland
- Died: 19 February 1998 (aged 91); Berkhamsted, Hertfordshire, England
- Occupations: Editor; Journalist

Mary Margaret Grieve OBE (11 April 1906 – 19 February 1998) was a Scottish magazine editor and journalist. She began her journalistic career working for local newspapers and specialised magazines before being appointed editor of Woman magazine in 1937. Grieve was made its associate editor not long after before returning to the position of editor in 1940, which she held until her early retirement in 1962. She led a group of editors who advised the Home Office on woman's duties during the Second World War. In retirement, Grieve authored two books offering tips for school-leaving girls and co-ran a Pâté making company.

== Biography ==
=== Early life ===
Grieve was born at 3 Blackburn Road in Ayr, Ayrshire on 11 April 1906. She was the youngest daughter and the second child of the fundholder Robert Grieve and the nurse Annie Craig, née Stark. Grieve spent most of her childhood bedridden due to illness, and was home-schooled until the age of 16, when she briefly attended a small Glasgow daily school, and then in Edinburgh. At age 17, she spent time in Switzerland, and went to a London secretarial college to learn shorthand and typing.

=== Career ===
Upon her return to Glasgow, Grieve sought independence, and worked on advertising for the Scottish Women's Rural Institutes's publication Scottish Home and County, and briefly edited the monthly magazine Scottish Nurse. She later worked as a freelancer for the next seven years for the women's picture paper The Bulletin, where she provided a new emphasis to women's features, and covered local happenings. Grieve authored the fictional book Without Alphonse: The Diary of a Frenchwomen in Scotland under the pseudonym "Ursula Mary Lyon" in 1935.

In 1936, she heard from her younger brother and a friend of his of a vacancy, and was summoned to be interviewed in London. She made the editor of Woman monthly magazine that was first published in July 1937. Grieve became the associate editor of Woman the same year following its owner Odhams Press bringing in the editor of Mother magazine to take over her former position. When the magazine's male editor joined the Royal Air Force in 1940, she once again was appointed editor. During the Second World War, Grieve led a group of editors who advised the Home Office on the role of women in the war. They argued against conscription women into the armed forces and persuaded the Home Office women contributed to the war effort by keeping communities and families united, and the men fighting for their wives and children would be demoralised if they believed their homes were divided. Grieve's lobbying led the government to exempt women from conscription. She and a friend used a stirrup pump while working as an air raid warden in London during The Blitz.

Grieve's success as editor of Woman magazine was based on how she understood her audience and scarcely featured the wealthy and well-known figures since their community was different to others and inaccessible at the time. She featured practical advice for food and established practical departments to demonstrate and test goods in the post-austerity era. Grieve sought to reach as many women across the United Kingdom as possible and encouraged reader participation by letter or telephone. From 1952 to 1960, she was a member of the Council for Industrial Design. Grieve was appointed to the National Council for Diplomas in Art and Design in 1960 and the council of the Royal College of Art three years later.

Following the purchase of Odhams Press by Daily Mirror Group for £38 million in 1961, Grieve made the decision to retire early in December 1962. In retirement, she wrote an autobiography, Millions Made my Story, in 1964. Grieve was asked by Collins to edit two books containing tips for school-leaving girls when the leaving age was raised to 16. They were the textbooks Fifteen in 1966 and Sixteen in 1967. She and a friend operated a Pâté making company Dove Delicacies she supplied to local restaurants and shops. Grieve continued to run the business until she suffered a major stroke in 1978.

== Personal life ==
Grieve received the OBE for "services to journalism". On 19 February 1998, she died at her home in Berkhamsted, Hertfordshire. She did not marry.

== Legacy ==
According to Martin Pugh in the book Women and Women's Movement in Britain, 1914–1959, Grieve "clearly thought" herself to be an "emancipated" woman and "not as mere tools in the hands of male power brokers." He noted she defended herself by arguing she followed market demands of her magazine.
