= Peter Jones (British musician) =

British musician (born 1980)

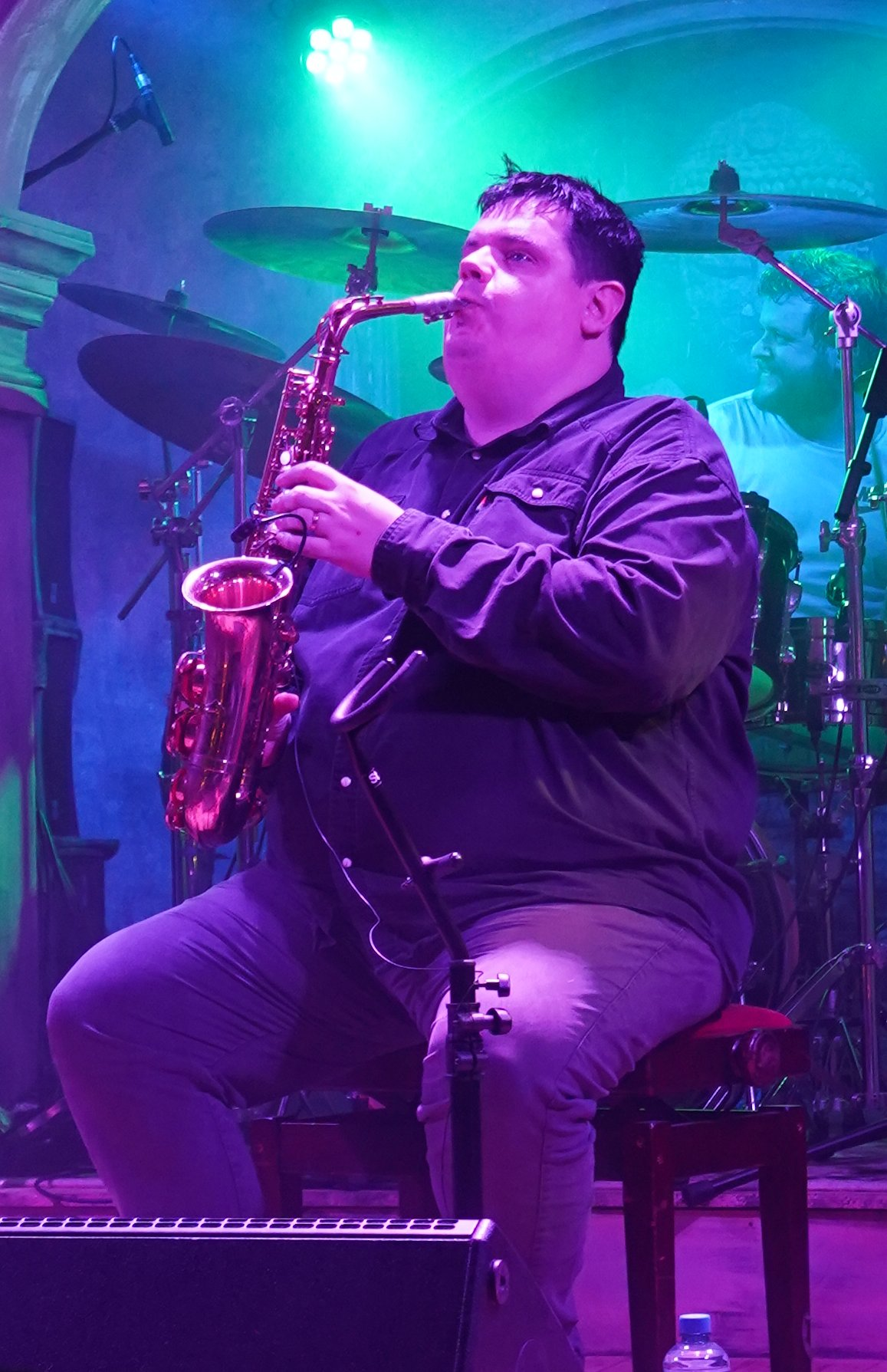
Jones guesting with Magenta in 2022 live at Trading Boundaries.

Peter Jones (born 6 October 1980) is a British musician. His multi-instrumental skills range from vocals to keyboards, piano, guitar, bass, saxophone, clarinet, recorder, whistles, and various percussion instruments.

Jones lost his sight at 15 months due to retinoblastoma, a form of cancer that attacks the light sensing portion of the eyes. He took to music learning his variety of instruments. He first came to prominence on the TV show Star for a Night in 2001, performing with his friend Emma Paine. The two teamed up again as 2 to Go in the first season of the TV series The X Factor with a national tour following suit.

Jones has recorded and produced his own original music under various names including Tiger Moth Tales. He also works with the band Red Bazar and has recorded with the Colin Tench Project. He performed on the 2015 remake of Spectral Mornings. In 2016 he was selected to join the band Camel, replacing Guy LeBlanc who had just died after a long bout with kidney cancer and temporary replacement Ton Scherpenzeel. He worked with band Barock Project on their 2017 Detachment album, singing lead vocals on two songs, contributing lyrics to three songs. In 2021 he also joined the progressive rock band Cyan. In 2023 he also joined the progressive rock band The Bardic Depths as a full-time member.

Since 2015, Peter has presented a bi-weekly radio show on Progzilla Radio, entitled Tales from the Tiger Moth.

In 2026 he participated in recording new EP album "in a fever dream" by Haken band.
