= Camel (album) =

Studio album by Camel
- Released: February 1973
- Recorded: 15–26 August 1972
- Studios: Morgan, London
- Genre: Progressive rock
- Length: 39:08
- Label: MCA
- Producer: Dave Williams

Camel chronology
Camel (1973)	Mirage (1974)

Singles from Camel
- 1. "Never Let Go" Released: 26 January 1973

Camel is the self-titled debut studio album by English progressive rock band Camel, released in February 1973 by MCA Records.

== Timeline ==
By August 1972, Camel were signed to MCA Records. They quickly entered the studio to record Camel. A collection of individual songs, chiefly from Andrew Latimer and Peter Bardens, the album was greeted with muted success and MCA did not take an option for a second album. By then, the group had acquired the management team of Geoff Jukes and Max Hole of Gemini Artists (later to become GAMA Records) and had moved to Decca Records, where they would remain for the next 10 years.

== Reception ==
In their ranking of the band's 14 albums, Prog Sphere placed Camel at #4, calling the song "Never Let Go" the real highlight on it. They wrote "this debut is not just another example of a stepping stone, but an accomplished work in its own right. While not as good as the group's later albums, it is a most excellent start and an essential Camel release, as well as a very good starting point to get into their wonderful music."

In a retrospective review for AllMusic, Daevid Jehnzen feels the album has "hints of promise" but "never gels into something special".

== Reissue ==
The album was remastered and reissued in 2002 on London Records with two bonus tracks: the single version of "Never Let Go" and a live version of "Homage to the God of Light", a staple of the band's early shows. A studio version of the latter had appeared on keyboard player Peter Bardens' debut solo album The Answer in 1970.

== Track listing ==
Side one
No.	Title	Writer(s)	Length
1.	"Slow Yourself Down"	Andrew Latimer, Andy Ward	4:47
2.	"Mystic Queen"	Peter Bardens	5:40
3.	"Six Ate" (instrumental)	Latimer	6:06
4.	"Separation"	Latimer	3:57

Side two
No.	Title	Writer(s)	Length
1.	"Never Let Go"	Latimer	6:26
2.	"Curiosity"	Bardens	5:55
3.	"Arubaluba" (instrumental)	Bardens	6:28

Bonus tracks
No.	Title	Writer(s)	Length
8.	"Never Let Go" (Single version)	Latimer	3:36
9.	"Homage to the God of Light" (Peter Bardens cover; Recorded Live at The Marquee Club – 29 October 1974)	Bardens	19:01

== Personnel ==
Camel

- Andrew Latimer – guitar; vocals (1, 4)
- Peter Bardens – organ, Mellotron, piano, VCS 3 synthesizer; vocals (5, 8)
- Doug Ferguson – bass guitar; vocals (2, 6)
- Andy Ward – drums, percussion

Production

- Dave Williams – producer
- Roger Quested – engineer
- Modula – sleeve design

== Release details ==
- 1973, UK, MCA MUPS 473, Release Date February 1973, LP
- 1977, UK, MCA MCL 1601 Release Date Approx 1977, LP
- 2002, UK, London 8829252, Release Date 3 June 2002, CD (remastered edition)
