= Jane Reed =

- cropped image by Peter Johns
- Born: March 31, 1940; Letchworth Garden City
- Died: February 27, 2025 (aged 84)
- Occupations: magazine and newspaper editor
- Partner: Michael Bird

Jane Barbara Reed (March 31, 1940 – February 27, 2025) was a British publishing executive. During the 1970s, she was the editor of Woman's Own magazine. She had leading positions with the Today newspaper and News International.

== Life ==
Reed was born in Letchworth Garden City in 1940. Her parents were William and Gwendoline (born Plaskett) Reed. When she was five, her father died and she was sent to boarding school. She emerged from the Royal Masonic school when she was eighteen noted for her skills as an artist and as a violinist. She tried St Martins but she went into the magazine industry.

She began her time at Woman's Own magazine in 1965 and she was promoted to be the editor in 1970. In 1973 the magazine created "Children of Courage" which recognises children who have shown heroism, endured pain or disability. The idea was still running 50 years later.

Woman's Own became a significant fund raiser for the Save the Children charity. They started, what became an annual event, with the "world’s biggest jumble sale" attracting donations in one year that included a pair of Peter Sellers' silk pyjamas and a dress worn by Sophia Loren.

In 1979, Jane Reed was moving on from being the editor on Woman's Own. The magazine was being described as "perhaps the most influential woman’s magazine in the English speaking world". Under her leadership the magazine had campaigned for Plain English and for women to have equal taxes to men. They had discussed how to examine your own breasts for cancer and given instructions as to how, a woman, in extremis, could give birth alone.

Reed moved on to lead the International Publishing Company (IPC) group of Women's magazines before spending a year as editor in chief of Woman magazine. She continued to rise inside the IPC empire until in 1985 she made a surprising break to become the Managing Editor of the Today newspaper which had been launched by Eddy Shah. She initially looked after features and she enjoyed her time there until in 1987 the newspaper was bought by Rupert Murdoch's company. She became a News International executive looking after corporate affairs which included merging Sky with BSB.

She nominally retired in 2002 but she was still a board member of The Times until 2022.

In 2007, she spoke on Radio 4's The Reunion about the launch of the Today newspaper with Kirsty Wark.

She died in 2025.

== Private life ==
Her partner was Michael Bird who was also in publishing although they did not co-habit. She shared her sister's three children as she was unable to have children due to ovarian cancer in her twenties.
