= Never Let Go (Camel song) =

Single by Camel

from the album Camel
- B-side: "Curiosity"
- Released: 26 January 1973
- Recorded: 15–26 August 1972; Morgan Studios, London
- Genre: Progressive rock; art rock
- Length: 3:40 (single edit); 6:23 (album version)
- Label: MCA
- Songwriter: Andrew Latimer

Camel singles chronology
"Never Let Go" (1973)	"Flight of the Snow Goose" (1975)

"Never Let Go" is the debut single by English progressive rock band Camel, released in January 1973. The B-side of the single is the Peter Bardens song "Curiosity". It is from their self-titled debut album (1973), and is considered one of their signature songs. In addition to the single version (which is shortened from the album version), the song appeared on three different live albums (and giving the title to the band's 1993 live double-CD Never Let Go, recorded in the Netherlands).

== Structure ==
The song, written by Andy Latimer, starts with him repeatedly playing a ten-second riff four times as other instruments fill the song. Then comes the first verse, where Peter Bardens sings. There is a short instrumental break, and then comes the second verse, with Bardens singing again. Afterward, there is a long keyboard solo by Bardens, and then comes the last verse. After the last verse, there is a guitar solo by Latimer until the song fades out.
