= Camel (band) =

English progressive rock band

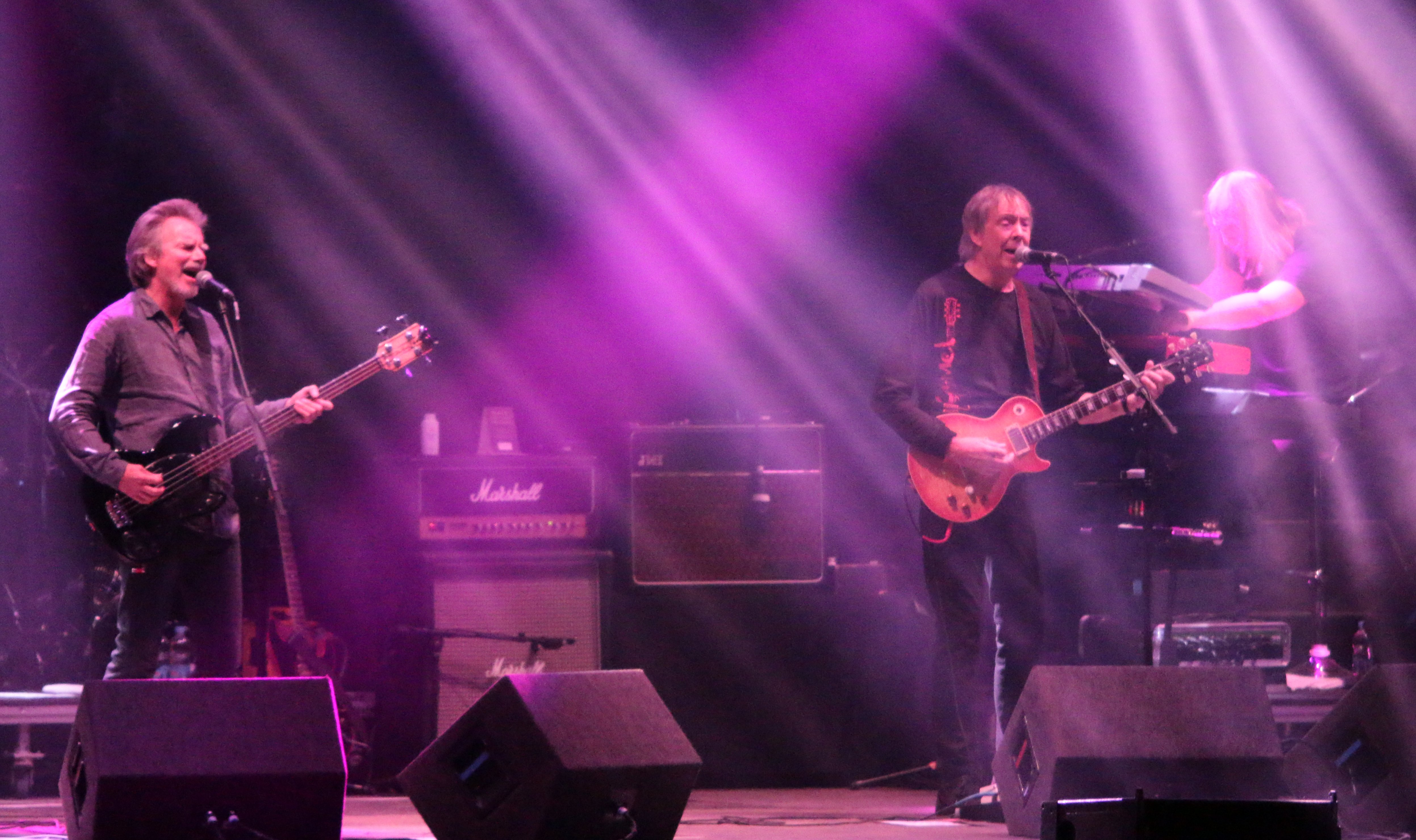
- Camel performing in 2015

Background information
- Origin: Guildford, Surrey, England
- Genre: Progressive rock
- Years active: 1971–1984; 1991–present
- Labels: MCA; Deram; Gama; Janus; Decca; Camel Productions
- Members: Andrew Latimer; Colin Bass; Denis Clement; Pete Jones
- Past members: Andy Ward; Peter Bardens; Doug Ferguson; Mel Collins; Richard Sinclair; Jan Schelhaas; Dave Sinclair; Kit Watkins; Chris Rainbow; David Paton; Paul Burgess; Mickey Simmonds; Guy LeBlanc; Ton Scherpenzeel
- Website: camelproductions.com

Camel are an English progressive rock band formed in Guildford, Surrey, in 1971. Originating from the blues-rock trio Brew, guitarist Andrew Latimer, drummer Andy Ward, and bassist Doug Ferguson initially worked as the backing band for singer-songwriter Phillip Goodhand-Tait before recruiting keyboardist Peter Bardens and establishing the group's progressive sound.

The band became a prominent fixture of the 1970s progressive rock movement, achieving a dedicated cult following and critical acclaim with a series of conceptual and thematic releases, including Mirage (1974), the instrumental breakthrough The Snow Goose (1975), and Moonmadness (1976). During the late 1970s and early 1980s, the group pivoted toward a more commercial, jazz-oriented direction on records such as Rain Dances (1977) and Nude (1981), while undergoing rapid lineup alterations that began with the departure of Ferguson in late 1976 and culminated in the acrimonious exit of Bardens in 1978.

Despite internal instability—including the eventual departure of Ward following severe health issues and a subsequent reliance on transient session musicians at Abbey Road Studios—the group secured high-profile studio collaborations with artists such as Brian Eno and Phil Collins. Following the expiration of their contract with Decca Records and a period of prolonged legal disputes with former management, the band temporarily dissolved in late 1984. Latimer subsequently relocated to the United States and established the independent label Camel Productions, under which he reformed the band in 1991.

Although they have not released any new studio material since A Nod and a Wink (2002), the group resumed touring after a decade-long hiatus, undertaking retrospective concert runs from 2013 to 2018. Plans for a 50th anniversary tour in 2023 were ultimately cancelled due to Latimer requiring emergency back surgery, prompting the group to redirect their focus toward archival releases. Their music has been widely cited as a primary influence on a later generation of progressive rock and metal artists, including Marillion, Opeth, and Steven Wilson, with music journalist Mark Blake characterising the group as "the great unsung heroes of '70s prog rock."

== History ==
=== 1971–75: Formation and early years ===
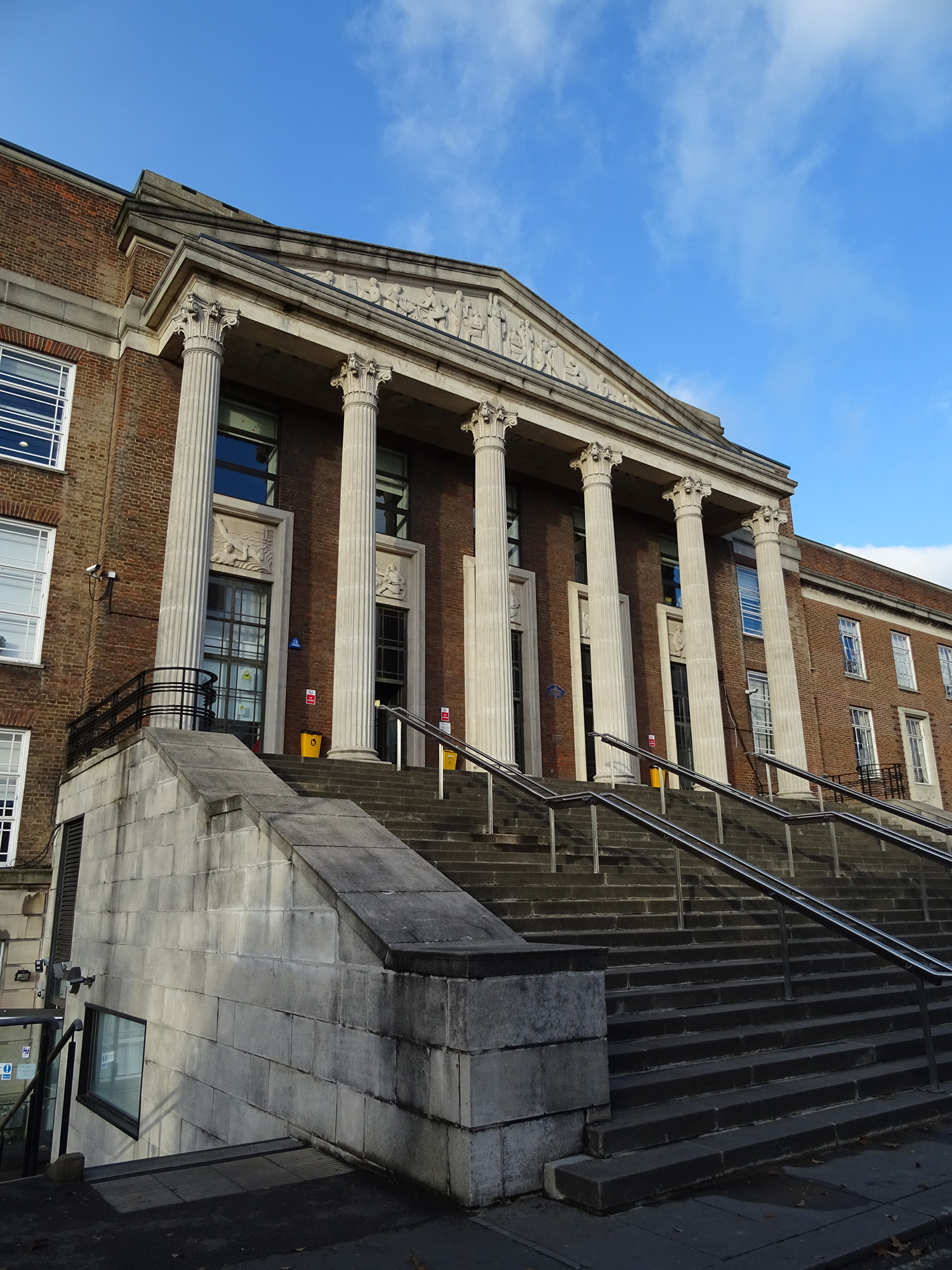
Waltham Forest College (then Waltham Forest Technical College), where Camel made their live debut under the name in 1971.

The band was formed by guitarist Andrew Latimer, drummer Andy Ward, bassist Doug Ferguson, and keyboardist Peter Bardens. Latimer, Ward, and Ferguson had previously performed in the Guildford area as a blues-rock trio named Brew. In February 1971, they successfully auditioned to serve as the backing band for singer-songwriter Phillip Goodhand-Tait, subsequently recording backing tracks for his studio album, I Think I'll Write a Song, at Dick James Studios the following month. Following the completion of the album, which was released in September 1971, the trio separated from Goodhand-Tait to seek a keyboardist who could expand their progressive sound. After placing an advertisement in Melody Maker, they auditioned Bardens, formerly of Them and Shotgun Express, who joined the group after performing on a borrowed Hammond organ. In October 1971, the newly formed quartet travelled to Ireland to fulfil Bardens' outstanding contractual obligations under the name of his previous ensemble, On.

Upon their return to England, they renamed themselves Camel and made their live debut with the name at Waltham Forest Technical College in London on 4 December 1971, supporting Wishbone Ash. The band started touring regularly in January 1972, cultivating a reputation as a proficient live ensemble that blended progressive rock and jazz rock. Because they had primarily functioned as an instrumental backing group, they lacked a dedicated lead vocalist and auditioned 30 singers during this early period. However, the group drew confidence from the commercial success of the Dutch band Focus, whose repertoire was largely instrumental, to continue primarily as an instrumental band with Latimer assuming vocal duties on several tracks.

In August 1972, Camel signed a three-album recording contract with MCA Records and recorded their self-titled debut, Camel, which was released in February 1973. Although supported by the single "Never Let Go", both releases failed to enter the UK charts, prompting MCA to decline their option for a second album. The group subsequently appointed Geoff Jukes and Max Hole of Gemini Artists as their management team, who negotiated a new contract with Deram Records, a progressive subsidiary of Decca.

Recorded in late 1973 under the direction of producer Dave Hitchcock, Camel's second studio album, Mirage, featured two extended, multi-part compositions: the 12-minute epic "Lady Fantasy" and "The White Rider" based on J. R. R. Tolkien's The Lord of the Rings. The album's cover artwork, designed by Phil Smee, featured a distorted, out-of-focus version of the Camel cigarette logo to evoke a mirage effect. Although the tobacco company's European division supported the design—and independently negotiated a deal with Camel's management to distribute free promotional cigarettes with the LP—threats of legal action from the its American division forced a change. Consequently, the US pressing features a cartoon camel standing on the Moon. Released in March 1974, Mirage failed to chart in the UK but gained traction in the US, where it peaked at No. 149 on the Billboard 200. This American commercial interest prompted Camel to embark on a three-month tour of the country starting in November 1974. Despite the lack of domestic commercial impact, Latimer later recalled that executives at Deram remained highly supportive of the group, predicting that their subsequent album would serve as their breakthrough.

=== 1975–77: Breakthrough and line-up shifts ===
Following the release of Mirage, the group began researching literature to serve as the basis for a follow-up record. The band initially auditioned early musical material in June 1974 based on Hermann Hesse's novel Siddhartha, an idea suggested by keyboardist Peter Bardens. However, the concept proved unworkable and was subsequently abandoned. Ferguson then suggested adapting the 1941 novella The Snow Goose by American author Paul Gallico, and the group completed an instrumental suite that premiered live in September 1974. The project was originally intended to feature lyrics, but Gallico threatened legal action over copyright infringement, forcing the band to abandon the text. Consequently, the prefix "Music Inspired by..." was appended to the front cover and the narrative summaries were removed from the liner notes. While contemporary rumours suggested that Gallico initiated the dispute because he was a vehement anti-smoker who mistook the band for a promotion for the Camel cigarette brand, biographers note that he was a smoker and his objections were strictly restricted to intellectual property rights.

Released in April 1975, The Snow Goose served as the band's commercial breakthrough, peaking at No. 22 on the UK Albums Chart and No. 162 in the US. To promote the release, Camel made a high-profile appearance at the Royal Albert Hall in October 1975, performing the album in its entirety alongside the London Symphony Orchestra. Following the success of the album and its accompanying showcase, Camel were voted Britain's "Brightest Hope" in the annual Melody Maker readers' poll at the end of the year.

Moonmadness was recorded in early 1976, and the last album to feature the original lineup. The record features tracks inspired by the individual personalities of the four band members—"Chord Change" (Bardens), "Another Night" (Ferguson), "Air Born" (Latimer), and "Lunar Sea" (Ward). Released in March 1976, it outperformed The Snow Goose on the album charts, peaking at No. 15 in the UK and No. 118 in the US. To expand their live sound for the subsequent promotional tour, the band recruited former King Crimson saxophonist and flautist Mel Collins as a touring member. Tensions regarding the band's future musical direction grew during this period; drummer Ward advocated for a transition toward jazz fusion, a style that Ferguson felt uncomfortable pursuing. As a result, Ferguson quit the band prior to the recording sessions for their next album. He formed the short-lived ensemble Headwaiter before permanently retiring from the professional music industry to become a property developer.

=== 1977–84: Commercial transition and disbanding ===
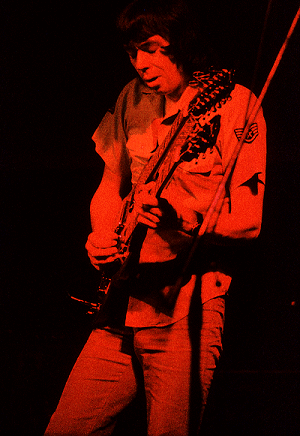
Co-founder Andrew Latimer performing live with Camel in 1977

Ferguson was replaced by former Caravan bassist Richard Sinclair, and Collins was integrated as an official member, expanding the band into a five-piece lineup. This configuration recorded Rain Dances (1977), which featured additional piano and synthesizer contributions from Brian Eno on the track "Elke". This was followed in April 1978 by Camel's first live album, the double LP A Live Record, which compiled performances recorded between 1974 and 1977, including excerpts from their 1975 concert at the Royal Albert Hall with the London Symphony Orchestra. Later in 1978, the band released Breathless, which showcased a more commercially oriented sound. In July 1978, shortly before the promotional tour for the album, Bardens left the band following creative disagreements with Latimer. To fulfill their live commitments, Camel recruited two keyboardists formerly associated with Caravan: Dave Sinclair (cousin of Richard) and Jan Schelhaas.

Both Sinclair cousins departed the band at the conclusion of the Breathless tour, prompting the enlistment of Happy the Man keyboardist Kit Watkins and bassist Colin Bass. This newly reconstituted quintet recorded I Can See Your House from Here (1979) with producer Rupert Hine, featuring guest percussion from Phil Collins. Designed by Gered Mankowitz, the album's controversial cover artwork featured a manipulated photograph of a crucified astronaut gazing toward Earth—a visual satire inspired by a popular contemporary religious joke, which also paid stylistic homage to Salvador Dalí's 1951 painting Christ of Saint John of the Cross. Watkins left the band shortly after the subsequent tour.

In 1980, the band recorded Nude, a concept album based on the true story of Japanese soldier Hiroo Onoda, who was marooned on an island during World War II and did not realise the conflict had ended. The record featured conceptual ideas and lyrics from Latimer's future wife, Susan Hoover, and Duncan Mackay provided the majority of the keyboard parts in lieu of Watkins and Schelhaas, who returned for the tour. Released in January 1981, Nude reached No. 34 on the UK Albums Chart.

Following the 1981 tour, Watkins and Bass departed, and Ward took an extended sabbatical following a suicide attempt brought on by severe alcohol and drug abuse. Left without a stable lineup to fulfill their contractual obligations with Decca, Latimer enlisted guest and session musicians at Abbey Road Studios in early 1982 to record The Single Factor. The album featured contributions from Chris Rainbow, David Paton, and Anthony Phillips, and peaked at No. 57 in the UK. Ward returned briefly for the tour but permanently left the group in early 1983, citing an inability to cope with the pressures of active touring and the music industry.

A new lineup featuring Dutch keyboardist Ton Scherpenzeel of Kayak and drummer Paul Burgess of 10cc recorded Stationary Traveller (1984), a concept album inspired by the divided city of East and West Berlin. The subsequent tour was documented on the live album Pressure Points: Live in Concert. Camel's contract with Decca expired in late 1984; following the resolution of a prolonged legal dispute with former manager Geoff Jukes over past commissions, Latimer dissolved the group and relocated to the United States.

=== 1991–present: Reformation, independent releases, and retrospective tours ===
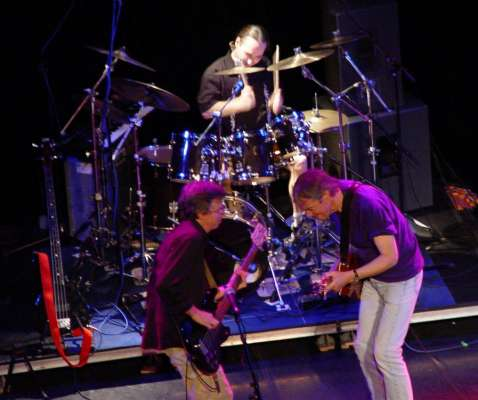
Camel performing in 2003

After a seven-year hiatus, Latimer revived the Camel name in 1991 and released the album Dust and Dreams under his own independent label Camel Productions. The album featured several players who had appeared on the group's two previous albums in the early 1980s. Keyboardist Mickey Simmonds, who had previously backed Mike Oldfield and Fish, joined in 1992.

In the meantime, Latimer and Hoover wrote Harbour of Tears (a nickname for Cobh Harbour in Ireland from which many sailed to the United States during the Great Famine) under the Camel name, which was released in 1996. In 1999 Latimer, drummer Dave Stewart, bassist Colin Bass, and keyboardist Ton Scherpenzeel recorded Rajaz, a record inspired by an ancient Arabic poetic metre of the same name that reflects the rhythm of camel footsteps in the desert. In 2001, Latimer assembled another new lineup with Bass, drummer Denis Clement, and keyboardist Guy LeBlanc. The band released the album A Nod and a Wink in 2002. The album was dedicated to original keyboardist Peter Bardens, who had died early that year.

In 2007, Latimer was diagnosed with myelofibrosis, a rare form of bone cancer. He was originally given 20 months to live, but recovered from chemotherapy and a bone marrow transplant. He was determined to continue as a musician, and ongoing pain in his hands caused him to develop new guitar playing techniques. Latimer made a sufficient enough recovery to resume group activity, and with a returning Clement, Bass, and LeBlanc, completed a European tour in October and November 2013 that featured The Snow Goose performed in its entirety for the first time since 1975. The tour coincided with a re-recorded version of the album released in November 2013, and featured additional European dates in 2014. LeBlanc withdrew from touring in 2014 due to illness and died from kidney cancer in 2015; he was replaced by a returning Ton Scherpenzeel. At the 2014 Progressive Music Awards, Latimer was presented with a Lifetime Achievement Award and the 2013–14 Snow Goose tour was nominated in the Live Event category.

The band performed another album-themed tour in 2018, this time performing Moonmadness in its entirety, which included three sold out shows at the Zappa Shuni Amphitheater in Israel. The tour culminated in a show at the Royal Albert Hall in September 2018, which was released on the DVD Live at the Royal Albert Hall.

In November 2021, Camel announced their 50 Years Strong anniversary tour consisting of six UK dates scheduled for June 2023, intending to commemorate the fiftieth anniversary of their 1973 debut album. Additional continental European dates were added to the itinerary in January 2022, followed by a headline performance at the Caesarea Amphitheater in Israel. However, in March 2023, the entire tour was cancelled after Latimer required emergency back surgery following the diagnosis of a severe medical condition. The band have remained inactive following the tour's cancellation, redirecting their focus toward archival audio projects. Later in 2023, Universal Music Group released Air Born: The MCA & Decca Years 1973–1984, a 32-disc deluxe box set containing 27 CDs and 5 Blu-ray discs. The collection features newly remastered versions of every studio album and single issued during their major label tenure, alongside new stereo and 5.1 surround sound mixes of five albums, archival concert mixes, and previously unreleased session outtakes.

== Musical style ==
Camel have been described as a "symphonic prog rock band". Predominantly instrumental, Camel's music combines elements from rock, pop, jazz, blues, folk, classical and electronica. Though they are not from Canterbury, they have long been associated with the Canterbury scene due to their many historical connections with Caravan and other Canterbury progressive rock musicians.

== Legacy ==
Camel have been acknowledged as one of the principal influences on the neo-prog subgenre which emerged in the 1980s and produced Marillion as its most successful band. Former Marillion lead singer Fish said of his first impression of the band: "I thought they were a lot like Camel."

- The album Fuera de Tiempo by Argentinean band Rockaphonia contains three Camel tribute covers.
- A tribute band, The Humps, in Israel, routinely performs some of the band's material.
- Another tribute band named Fritha (after the song on The Snow Goose album) is performing in Japan
- In Sweden there is a tribute band named Lady Fantasy (after the song on the Mirage album).
- A band named Raha in Iran is doing covers of Camel songs.
- In Egypt, Andromida is also doing covers of Camel amongst their set.
- In 2010, the French progressive rock band Mirage, named after the title of Camel's second album, included Camel songs among a set of Yes, Jethro Tull and King Crimson pieces.
- In Lebanon, a band called Babel (as in 'Babylon') improvised over Camel's song "Storm Clouds" on 28 October 2011.
- Mikael Åkerfeldt of Swedish progressive death metal band Opeth has cited Camel to be an influence for the song "Hessian Peel" and previously joked on the Lamentations (Live at Shepherd's Bush Empire 2003) DVD that material from their Damnation (2003) album was a "rip-off" of Camel.
- Steven Wilson of Porcupine Tree has cited Camel as an influence. In a 2013 interview he expressed his interest to remix the classic Camel albums. Latimer later in 2013 replied positively to Wilson's interest.
- Rick Astley, in an interview with Billboard in 2016, referred to Camel touring The Snow Goose as his first ever concert, stating "it blew my mind".
- Andy Tillison of The Tangent recorded a track called Music Inspired by Music Inspired by The Snow Goose as a tribute to Camel, released on his 2016 solo album (Machte Es) Durch.

== Members ==
Current members

- Andrew Latimer – guitar, flute, recorder, keyboards, percussion, vocals (1971–present)
- Colin Bass – bass, acoustic guitar, keyboards, vocals (1979–1981, 1984–present)
- Denis Clement – drums, percussion, keyboards, fretless bass, recorder (2000–present)
- Peter Jones – keyboards, synthesisers, saxophones, vocals (2016–present)

== Discography ==
- Camel (1973)
- Mirage (1974)
- The Snow Goose (1975)
- Moonmadness (1976)
- Rain Dances (1977)
- Breathless (1978)
- I Can See Your House from Here (1979)
- Nude (1981)
- The Single Factor (1982)
- Stationary Traveller (1984)
- Dust and Dreams (1991)
- Harbour of Tears (1996)
- Rajaz (1999)
- A Nod and a Wink (2002)
