= Guy LeBlanc (keyboardist) =

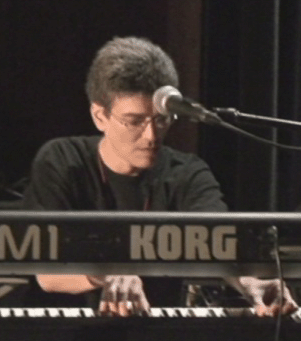
- Guy LeBlanc during soundcheck at FMPM 2007

Background information
- Born: October 16, 1960; Moncton, New Brunswick, Canada
- Origin: Ottawa, Ontario, Canada
- Died: April 27, 2015 (aged 54)
- Genres: Progressive rock, Jazz fusion
- Occupations: Keyboardist, songwriter, record producer
- Years active: 1975–2015
- Labels: Xntrik, Mahl, Camel
- Website: guyleblanc.com

Guy LeBlanc (October 16, 1960 – April 27, 2015) was a Canadian keyboardist and composer. He led his own progressive-rock band - Nathan Mahl, and was a member of the British progressive band Camel from 2000 to 2015. He produced and released his own solo, as well as Nathan Mahl's discs, and had appeared as guest keyboardist on several other releases.

== Biography ==
Born in 1960 in Moncton, New Brunswick, he began formal musical training at age four, and ended his classical piano training at age 11, in order to concentrate on composition and modern electric music. He started playing keyboards in Rock bands at 15 and co-founded Nathan Mahl at age 20 with Mark Spenard, Don Prince and Dan Lacasse. In 1991, on a dare, he released a series of recorded improvisations with two drummers, and dubbed the project Mahl Dynasty.

After reforming Nathan Mahl several times over many years through to the present, LeBlanc managed to record a few of these lineups, and chose to release some of these as independent discs. On the strength of his performance at NEARfest In 1999, with Nathan Mahl, he was invited to join the British progressive band Camel, with whom he toured in 2000-2001 and recorded the studio disc A Nod and a Wink

In 2002, LeBlanc wrote a couple of pieces with band leader Andrew Latimer. Since late 1999, he has been producing all his discs in his own digital studio, Subversia, named after his solo album from the same year. In 2001, he recorded one song with Curtis Reid on his disc Omniumgatherum. The following year he played keys with Donnamatrix on several tracks of their Cool Lynx EP.

LeBlanc was also recording other tracks with a few different projects, and hopes to catch up someday. In 2004, he released his second solo disc All the Rage, and recorded with Nathan Mahl the opening track to Odyssey, a 9 band collaboration spearheaded by The Finnish Progressive Music Association Colossus and the French label Musea. After this first collaboration, he then composed a piece for the four cd set Divine Comedy Inferno titled the Comfort of Tears (released in 2008), two songs performed on grand piano for the Iliad, one song (the Oval Portrait) for the Tales of Edgar Allan Poe (both released in 2010), and one song (Beyond the Wall of Sleep) for the Stories of H.P. Lovecraft (released in 2012), all these for Colossus-Musea.

LeBlanc participated in what was described as a progressive rock supergroup collaboration along with members of progressive avant-garde bands French TV and Boud Deun called The Distinguished Panel of Experts. Their debut cd Trans-Indulgent was released in 2009 jointly by labels Musea and Luna Negra. In 2011, Guy joined his friend David Campbell's band The Rebel Wheel in time for their appearance at the Prog Day festival 2011.

He died on April 27, 2015, of kidney cancer.

== Other projects ==
LeBlanc played guest keyboard spots on AraPacis' third album Netherworld from 2012 on the song Crisis and fourth album A Disturbing Awakening from 2014 on the song Wanderlust. During the fall of 2013, he returned to Camel.

== Discography ==
=== Subversia (1999) ===
This first solo disc includes guest performances from several friends, including the widely acclaimed guitarist Scott McGill (Hand Farm, Finneus Gauge and McGill-Manring-Stevens) on guitar. Winner of the best Fusion album of 1999 from Radio CFLX-FM in Sherbrooke Délire Musical.

Songs:

1. The First Lie
2. Joyride
3. A Question of Authority
4. The Cold Truth
5. The Trial
6. Subversia
7. Home

=== All the Rage ===
Aptly titled All the Rage and composed over a 2-year period, the disc parallels the tumultuous personal events that have helped shape this artist's life and work. Released in 2004, each song on this 70-plus minute CD tells a story within a story, and each story exposes a search within for the answers to life and art.

Songs:

1. Life on the Blade
2. All the Rage
3. Ailleurs
4. One Sky
5. the Silent Thread
6. the Immortals
7. the One who Knows
8. Choices
