= Muriel Harris =

American academic

- Born: Muriel Sheila Goldsmith; August 24, 1937 (age 89); Chicago, Illinois
- Spouse: Samuel Harris
- Children: 2

Academic background
- Education: University of Illinois Urbana-Champaign (BA, 1959; MA, 1960); Columbia University (PhD, 1972)

Academic work
- Discipline: Rhetoric & Composition
- Sub-discipline: Writing Center theory, practice, and administration
- Institutions: Purdue University

Muriel "Mickey" Sheila Harris (born 1937) is an American academic and scholar in composition and rhetoric who is best known as a writing center specialist. Professor Emerita of English at Purdue University, Harris is the author of over 90 written works spanning scholarly books and book chapters, textbooks, and peer-reviewed articles. In 1976, she founded Purdue University's Writing Lab in answer to English professors' desire for a writing center, and the handouts she developed were the material that Dave Taylor, a graduate student at the time, posted to create the Purdue Online Writing Lab (OWL). Her 1988 book Teaching One-to-One: The Writing Conference received the International Writing Center Association (IWCA) Outstanding Book Award in 1988. She was also inaugural recipient and namesake for the IWCA's Muriel Harris Outstanding Service Award. In 1999, she was awarded the Conference on College Composition and Communication (CCCC) Exemplar Award. In 2003, Michael A. Pemberton and Joyce Kinkead published The Center Will Hold: Critical Perspectives on Writing Center Scholarship, a collection of critical essays dedicated to Harris as festschrift (a book of tribute scholarship).

== Biography ==
Born on August 24, 1937, to parents Max and Ida (née Kessel) Goldsmith, Harris spent her early life in Chicago. She attended the University of Illinois Urbana-Champaign, from which she earned a Bachelor of Arts in English education (1959) and a Master of Arts in English (1960). In 1972, she earned a Doctor of Philosophy in Language and Literature from Columbia University.

In 1976, Harris joined the English department of Purdue University where she founded the university's first Writing Center, the Online Writing Lab (OWL) and the Writing Lab Newsletter.

Harris retired from Purdue University in 2003.

=== Research ===
Harris's research focuses on individual differences among student writers and the verbal and nonverbal interactions that take place during one-to-one writing conferences. While earlier work utilized cognitive models to analyze mental processes and revision strategies, her later scholarship explores the political and administrative agendas that shape the institutional status and viability of writing centers.

=== Editorial work ===
Harris founded the Writing Lab Newsletter and published its first issue as editor in April 1977. This was an important contribution to the field of writing center studies, according to Michael A. Pemberton and Joyce Kinkead, because the publication "helped establish the basis of a new professional community and provided it with an important mechanism for cohesion." The Writing Lab Newsletter was later renamed to WLN: A Journal of Writing Center Scholarship.

=== National awards ===
- CCCC Exemplar Award, 1999
- IWCA Outstanding Book Award, 1988
- IWCA Outstanding Service Award, 1984

== Selected works ==
=== Books ===
- Harris, Muriel (1982). Tutoring writing: A sourcebook for writing labs. Scott, Foresman and Company. ISBN 0-673-15526-9.
- Harris, Muriel (1984). Practice for a Purpose. Houghton.
- Harris, Muriel; Gaston, Thomas (1995). Making Paragraphs Work. Holt.
- Harris, Muriel (1986). Teaching one-to-one: The writing conference. National Council of Teachers of English. ISBN 0-8141-5188-4. https://wacclearinghouse.org/docs/books/harris/teaching.pdf
- Harris, Muriel (1991). Practicing Grammar and Usage. Prentice Hall.
- Harris, Muriel (2003). The Prentice Hall reference guide to grammar and usage. Prentice Hall. ISBN 978-0131846784.
  - Later editions co-authored by Jennifer Kunka and published by Simon & Schuster
- Harris, Muriel (2004). The writer's FAQs: A pocket handbook. Prentice Hall.
  - Later editions co-authored by Jennifer Kunka and published by Simon & Schuster

=== Selected articles ===
- Harris, M. (1995). Talking in the middle: Why writers need writing tutors. College English, 57(1), 27–42. doi:10.58680/ce19959147
- Harris, M. (1992). Collaboration is not collaboration is not collaboration: Writing center tutorials vs. peer-response groups. College Composition & Communication, 43(3), 369–383. doi:10.58680/ccc19928872
