= Peter Jones (paediatrician) =

Dr. Peter Jones FRCP
- Born: 1937 (age 88–89)
- Occupation: Consultant paediatrician
- Employer: Royal Victoria Infirmary

Dr Peter Jones FRCP (born 1937) is a British consultant paediatrician, known for his work in the fields of haemophilia and HIV/AIDS.

His roles include consultant paediatrician at the Royal Victoria Infirmary, Newcastle upon Tyne; director of the Newcastle Haemophilia Centre; and executive member of the World Federation of Hemophilia.

In 1981, the Haemophilia Society awarded him their gold medal, the Macfarlane Award. He is a Fellow of the Royal College of Physicians (FRCP).

In 1986, he appeared as himself in the Auf Weidersehen, Pet special Educating Oz.

In September 2016, he appeared in an edition of the BBC Radio 4 programme The Reunion, to discuss contaminated blood products that were used to treat British haemophiliacs.

== Bibliography ==
- Living with Haemophilia. Oxford University Press. 2002. ISBN 978-0-19-263229-6.
