= Madeleine Simms =

British activist (1930–2011)

- Born: Madeleine Zimmerman; 6 September 1930
- Died: 3 October 2011 (aged 81)
- Known for: Helping to pass the Abortion Act 1967
- Notable work: Abortion Law Reformed (1971)

Madeleine Simms (née Zimmermann: 6 September 1930 – 3 October 2011) was an Austrian-born British social campaigner and one of the architects of the Abortion Act 1967.

== Personal life ==
She was born Madeleine Zimmerman in Vienna to a Jewish family and they moved to London where she was educated at St Paul's Girls' School (at the same time as Shirley Williams) and then read Moral Philosophy and English Literature at Aberdeen University. She married Dennis Simms in 1956, whom she met through the Jewish Graduates Association. They had two children together: Nick (born 1959) and Harriet (born 1965).

Simms was a humanist, and wrote a regular column titled "Better 1/2" for Humanist News. She was also a member of the Rationalist Press Association.

== As a campaigner ==
After the birth of her first child (Nick) in 1959, Simms discovered abortion was illegal in the UK. She joined the Abortion Law Reform Association, becoming press officer and editor of the newsletter, and worked on what would become the 1967 Abortion Act with Liberal MP David Steel. While this was less radical than she liked, she pragmatically considered it a good start.

She was latterly a trustee of various population and birth control trusts, including the Birth Control Trust, the Simon Population Trust and the Galton Institute. She was also the deputy director of the Institute for Social Studies in Medical Care, London. For a period, she was seconded to the Department of Health research management division, writing articles, pamphlets and reports.

== See also ==
- Abortion in the United Kingdom

== Selected bibliography ==
- Abortion Law Reformed (1971), with Keith Hindell
- Non-medical Abortion Counselling (1973)
- Teenage Mothers and Their Partners (1991)
