= Roxy Music discography =

- Studio albums: 8
- Live albums: 6
- Compilation albums: 10
- Singles: 26
- Video albums: 9
- Box sets: 6

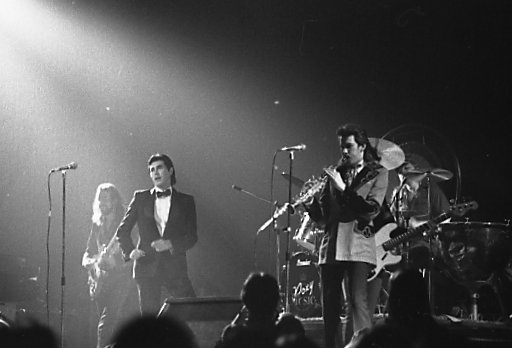

The discography of the band Roxy Music includes eight studio albums, two live albums, and two compilations released during the band's career proper 1971 to 1983, and numerous singles in various international markets. After they disbanded, numerous compilations in both audio and video media, box sets, and further live albums followed into the 21st century; the band reunited several times for concert tours in that century.

== Albums ==
=== Studio albums ===
Title	Album details	Peak chart positions										Certifications
Title	Album details	UK	AUS	AUT	CAN	GER	NL	NOR	NZ	SWE	US	Certifications
Roxy Music	Released: 16 June 1972; UK label: Island; US label: Reprise/Warner Bros.; Formats: LP, MC, 8-track	10	49	—	—	—	89 (Note: Chart position in 2018.)	23	—	—	—	UK: Gold
For Your Pleasure	Released: 23 March 1973; UK label: Island; US label: Warner Bros.; Formats: LP, MC, 8-track	4	41	9	—	28	—	15	—	—	193	UK: Gold
Stranded	Released: November 1973; UK label: Island; US label: Atco; Formats: LP, MC, 8-track	1	33	—	—	39	—	14	37 (Note: Chart position is from 1975 as there was no album chart prior to 1975.)	11	186	UK: Gold
Country Life	Released: 15 November 1974; UK label: Island; US label: Atco; Formats: LP, MC, 8-track	3	26	10	47	38	—	15	8	4	37	UK: Gold
Siren	Released: 24 October 1975; UK label: Island; US label: Atco; Formats: LP, MC, 8-track	4	12	—	53	—	9	15	33	8	50	UK: Gold
Manifesto	Released: 16 March 1979; UK label: Polydor/E.G.; US label: Atco; Formats: LP, MC, 8-track	7	13	25	24	37	5	—	8	11	23	UK: Gold; NL: Gold; NZ: Gold
Flesh and Blood	Released: 23 May 1980; UK label: Polydor/E.G.; US label: Atco; Formats: LP, MC, 8-track	1	10	15	12	6	8	6	1	7	35	UK: Platinum; AUS: Gold; GER: Gold; NZ: Platinum
Avalon	Released: 28 May 1982; UK label: Polydor/E.G.; US label: Warner Bros.; Formats: LP, MC, 8-track	1	1	5	1	4	1	1	1	1	53	UK: Platinum; AUS: Platinum; CAN: Platinum; GER: Gold; NL: Platinum; NZ: Platinum; US: Platinum
"—" denotes releases that did not chart or were not released in that territory.

=== Live albums ===
Title	Album details	Peak chart positions									Certifications
Title	Album details	UK	AUS	CAN	GER	NL	NOR	NZ	SWE	US	Certifications
Viva!	Released: 16 July 1976; UK label: Island; US label: Atco; Formats: LP, MC, 8-track	6	15	94	48	2	10	20	9	81	UK: Silver
The High Road	Released: March 1983; UK label: Polydor/E.G.; US label: Warner Bros.; Formats: LP, MC	26	13	5	25	11	—	21	22	67	
Heart Still Beating	Released: 22 October 1990; UK label: Virgin/E.G.; US label: Reprise; Formats: CD, 2×LP, MC	—	—	—	—	78	—	—	—	—	
Concert Classics	Released: February 1998; Label: Ranch Life; Formats: CD	—	—	—	—	—	—	—	—	—	
Concerto	Released: June 2001; Label: Burning Airlines; Formats: 2×CD	—	—	—	—	—	—	—	—	—	
Live	Released: 2 June 2003; Label: Eagle; Formats: 2×CD	170	—	—	100	—	—	—	—	—	
"—" denotes releases that did not chart or were not released in that territory.

=== Compilation albums ===
Title	Album details	Peak chart positions										Certifications
Title	Album details	UK	AUS	AUT	CAN	GER	NL	NOR	NZ	SWE	US	Certifications
Greatest Hits	Released: November 1977; UK label: Island; US label: Atco; Formats: LP, MC, 8-track	20	—	—	—	—	—	—	—	—	—	UK: Gold
The Atlantic Years 1973–1980	Released: November 1983; UK label: Polydor/E.G.; US label: Atco; Formats: CD, LP, MC	23	60	—	88	62	46	—	31	—	183	
Street Life: 20 Great Hits (Bryan Ferry and Roxy Music)	Released: 14 April 1986; UK label: E.G.; US label: Reprise; Formats: CD, 2×LP, MC	1	2	23	90 (Note: Charted in 1989.)	14	10	—	1	—	100	UK: Platinum; NZ: Platinum
The Ultimate Collection (Bryan Ferry and Roxy Music)	Released: 7 November 1988; Label: E.G.; Formats: CD, LP, MC	6	11	—	—	43	31	—	15	23	—	UK: 3× Platinum; AUS: 2× Platinum
More Than This: The Best of Bryan Ferry + Roxy Music (Bryan Ferry and Roxy Music)	Released: 30 October 1995; Label: Virgin; Formats: CD, 2×LP, MC	15	9	—	—	91	—	4	23	31	—	UK: Platinum
Slave to Love: Best of the Ballads (Bryan Ferry and Roxy Music)	Released: July 2000; Label: Virgin; Formats: CD, MC, MD	11	—	—	—	16	—	17	35	10	—	UK: Gold
The Early Years	Released: 28 August 2000; UK label: Virgin; US label: Caroline; Formats: CD	125	—	—	—	—	—	—	—	—	—	
The Best of Roxy Music	Released: 11 June 2001; Label: Virgin; Formats: CD, MC	12	—	27	—	19	—	—	—	—	—	UK: Platinum
The Platinum Collection (Bryan Ferry and Roxy Music)	Released: 7 June 2004; Label: Virgin; Formats: 3×CD	17	—	—	—	—	41	—	—	—	—	UK: Gold
Essential	Released: 31 October 2011; Label: EMI/Virgin; Formats: CD	—	—	—	—	—	—	—	—	—	—	UK: Gold
"—" denotes releases that did not chart or were not released in that territory.

=== Box sets ===
Title	Album details	Peak chart positions		
Title	Album details	UK	GER	NL
The First Seven Albums	Released: December 1981; Label: Polydor/E.G.; Formats: 7×LP, 7×MC	—	—	—
The Early Years	Released: 18 December 1989; Label: E.G.; Formats: 4×CD, 4×MC	—	—	—
The Later Years	Released: 18 December 1989; Label: E.G.; Formats: 4×CD, 4×MC	—	—	—
The Thrill of It All	Released: 20 November 1995; Label: Virgin; Formats: 4×CD	—	—	—
The Complete Studio Recordings	Released: 6 August 2012; Label: Virgin; Formats: 10×CD	160	20	91
The Studio Albums	Released: 16 March 2015; Label: Virgin; Formats: 8×LP	—	—	—
"—" denotes releases that did not chart or were not released in that territory.

=== Video albums ===
Title	Album details
The High Road	Released: March 1983; Label: Spectrum; Formats: VHS, Beta, LD
On the Road	Released: 21 February 1990; Label: Suncrown; Formats: VHS, LD
Total Recall – A History 1972–1982	Released: March 1990; Label: Virgin Music Video/E.G.; Formats: VHS, LD
Video Collection (Bryan Ferry and Roxy Music)	Released: October 1995; Label: Virgin; Formats: VHS, LD
The High Road (reissue, first time on DVD)	Released: 7 December 2001; Label: Universal; Formats: DVD
Live at the Apollo	Released: 6 May 2002; Label: Warner Music Vision; Formats: DVD, VHS
On the Road (reissue, first time on DVD)	Released: 2003; Label: ILC Entertainment; Formats: DVD
The Thrill of It All	Released: 26 November 2007; Label: Virgin; Formats: 2xDVD
More Than This – The Story of Roxy Music	Released: 19 October 2009; Label: Eagle Vision; Formats: DVD

== Singles ==
Title	Year	Peak chart positions										Certifications	Album
Title	Year	UK	AUS	BEL (FL)	CAN	GER	IRE	NL	NZ	SWE	US	Certifications	Album
"Virginia Plain"	1972	4	99	—	—	20	14	18	6	—	—		Non-album singles
"Pyjamarama"	1973	10	96	—	—	—	—	—	—	—	—		Non-album singles
"Do the Strand" (Note: Upon initial release in 1973, "Do the Strand" was only released as a single in Continental Europe, Japan and the US. It was released in the UK and Australia in 1978, but failed to chart.)	1973	—	—	—	—	41	—	23	—	—	—		For Your Pleasure
"Street Life"	1973	9	—	—	—	40	—	—	—	—	—		Stranded
"All I Want Is You"	1974	12	—	—	—	—	—	—	—	—	—		Country Life
"The Thrill of It All" (Note: "The Thrill of It All" was only released as a single in the US.)	1974	—	—	—	—	—	—	—	—	—	—		Country Life
"Love Is the Drug"	1975	2	18	15	3	39	—	9	24	—	30	UK: Silver; NZ: Gold	Siren
"Both Ends Burning"	1975	25	—	—	—	—	17	—	—	—	—		Siren
"Virginia Plain" (reissue)	1977	11	—	25	—	—	—	24	—	—	—		Greatest Hits
"Do the Strand" (reissue)	1978	—	—	—	—	—	—	—	—	—	—		Greatest Hits
"Trash"	1979	40	—	29	—	—	—	40	—	—	—		Manifesto
"Dance Away"	1979	2	92	12	75	30	1	8	10	20	44	UK: Gold; NZ: Gold	Manifesto
"Angel Eyes"	1979	4	89	4	—	—	12	13	50	—	—	UK: Silver	Manifesto
"Over You"	1980	5	45	—	—	31	6	24	24	—	80	UK: Silver	Flesh and Blood
"Oh Yeah"	1980	5	—	—	—	14	9	39	—	—	102		Flesh and Blood
"Flesh and Blood" (Note: "Flesh and Blood" was only released as a single in Italy.)	1980	—	—	—	—	—	—	—	—	—	—		Flesh and Blood
"Same Old Scene"	1980	12	35	27	—	—	13	29	—	—	—		Flesh and Blood
"In the Midnight Hour" (Note: "In the Midnight Hour" was only released as a single in the US, Canada and Portugal.)	1980	—	—	—	—	—	—	—	—	—	106		Flesh and Blood
"Giddy Up" (as the Dumbells)	1980	—	—	—	—	—	—	—	—	—	—		Non-album singles
"Jealous Guy"	1981	1	1	5	—	19	3	10	4	18	—	UK: Gold	Non-album singles
"More Than This"	1982	6	6	14	—	24	6	25	12	17	102	UK: Gold; NZ: Platinum	Avalon
"Avalon"	1982	13	22	5	—	45	9	8	37	19	—	UK: Gold; NZ: Platinum	Avalon
"Take a Chance with Me"	1982	26	—	12	32	68	5	20	—	—	104		Avalon
"Like a Hurricane" (Note: "Like a Hurricane" was only released as a promotional single in Spain.)	1983	—	—	—	—	—	—	—	—	—	—		The High Road
"Love Is the Drug" (live)	1990	87	—	—	—	—	—	—	—	—	—		Heart Still Beating
"Love Is the Drug" (Faithless remix)	1996	33	—	—	—	—	—	—	—	—	—		More Than This
"—" denotes releases that did not chart or were not released in that territory.
