= The Best of Roxy Music =

Greatest hits album by Roxy Music
- Released: 11 June 2001
- Genre: Art rock; pop
- Length: 74:20
- Label: Virgin
- Producer: Chris Thomas, John Punter, Peter Sinfield, Rhett Davies, Roxy Music

Roxy Music chronology
Valentine (2000)	The Best of Roxy Music (2001)	Concerto (2001)

Professional ratings
Review scores
Source	Rating
AllMusic	4.5/5 stars
Record Collector	5/5 stars

The Best of Roxy Music is a greatest hits album by English art rock band Roxy Music, released in 2001. The album includes at least one song from all eight of the band's studio albums and all three of their non-album single A-sides. The songs are arranged in reverse chronological order. None of Bryan Ferry's solo tracks are included.

== Track listing ==
All tracks are written by Bryan Ferry, except where noted.

No.	Title	Writer(s)	Original album	Length
1.	"Avalon"		Avalon (1982)	4:16
2.	"More Than This"		Avalon	4:19
3.	"Jealous Guy"	John Lennon	non-album single (1981)	4:57
4.	"Over You"	Ferry, Phil Manzanera	Flesh and Blood (1980)	3:27
5.	"Same Old Scene"		Flesh and Blood	3:59
6.	"Oh Yeah"		Flesh and Blood	4:52
7.	"Angel Eyes"	Ferry, Andy Mackay	Manifesto (1979)	2:52
8.	"Dance Away"		Manifesto	3:47
9.	"Both Ends Burning"		Siren (1975)	5:15
10.	"Love Is the Drug"	Ferry, Mackay	Siren	4:08
11.	"Out of the Blue"	Ferry, Manzanera	Country Life (1974)	4:45
12.	"All I Want Is You"		Country Life	2:54
13.	"Mother of Pearl"		Stranded (1973)	6:35
14.	"Street Life"		Stranded	3:28
15.	"Do the Strand"		For Your Pleasure (1973)	4:03
16.	"Pyjamarama"		non-album single (1973)	2:52
17.	"Virginia Plain"		non-album single, later included on re-releases of Roxy Music (1972)	2:58
18.	"Re-Make/Re-Model"		Roxy Music	4:53
Total length:				1:14:11

== Personnel ==
As per album credits:

Musicians

- Bryan Ferry
- Andy Mackay
- Phil Manzanera
- Brian Eno
- Paul Thompson
- Graham Simpson
- John Porter
- Eddie Jobson
- Rik Kenton
- John Gustafson
- Neil Jason
- Alan Spenner
- Gary Tibbs
- Neil Hubbard
- Andy Newmark
- A. Schwartzberg
- Jimmy Maelen
- David Skinner
- Paul Carrack
- Yanick Étienne
- Fonzi Thornton
- Richard Tee
- Michael Dawe

Production

- Design – Bogdan Zarkowski, Bryan Ferry, Nick De Ville
- Liner notes – Dr.I.D.Smith
- Photography by – Anton Corbijn, Antony Price, Karl Stoecker
- Producer – Chris Thomas, John Punter, Peter Sinfield, Rhett Davies, Roxy Music

== Charts ==
Chart performance for The Best of Roxy Music
Chart (2001)	Peak position
Australian Albums (ARIA)	84
Austrian Albums (Ö3 Austria)	27
Belgian Albums (Ultratop Flanders)	25
German Albums (Offizielle Top 100)	19
Spanish Albums (PROMUSICAE)	95
Swiss Albums (Schweizer Hitparade)	35
UK Albums (OCC)	12

== Certifications ==
Region	Certification	Certified units/sales
Belgium (BRMA)	Gold	25,000^{*}
United Kingdom (BPI)	Platinum	300,000^{*}
^{*} Sales figures based on certification alone.
