= Street Life: 20 Great Hits =

1986 greatest hits album by Bryan Ferry and Roxy Music

Greatest hits album by Bryan Ferry and Roxy Music
- Released: 14 April 1986
- Recorded: 1972–1985
- Genre: Glam rock; art rock; pop rock; new wave
- Length: 73:55
- Label: E.G.

Roxy Music chronology
The Atlantic Years 1973–1980 (1983)	Street Life: 20 Great Hits (1986)	The Ultimate Collection (1988)

Bryan Ferry chronology
Boys and Girls (1985)	Street Life: 20 Great Hits (1986)	Bête Noire (1987)

Professional ratings
Review scores
Source	Rating
AllMusic	4/5 stars
AllMusic (re-release)	4.5/5 stars

Street Life: 20 Great Hits is a greatest hits album by Bryan Ferry and Roxy Music, released on 14 April 1986 by E.G. Records. The album reached number one on both the New Zealand and UK Albums Charts in 1986.

No material from Roxy Music (1972), Country Life (1974) or In Your Mind (1977) was included.

== Track listing ==
All tracks are written by Bryan Ferry; except where noted.

No.	Title	Writer(s)	Length
1.	"Virginia Plain" (Roxy Music, non-album single, 1972)		2:58
2.	"A Hard Rain's a-Gonna Fall" (edit) (Bryan Ferry, from These Foolish Things, 1973)	Bob Dylan	4:15
3.	"Pyjamarama" (Roxy Music, non-album single, 1973)		2:52
4.	"Do the Strand" (edit) (Roxy Music, from For Your Pleasure, 1973)		3:46
5.	"These Foolish Things (Remind Me of You)" (Bryan Ferry, from These Foolish Things, 1973)	Eric Maschwitz, Jack Strachey	4:51
6.	"Street Life" (Roxy Music, from Stranded, 1973)		3:27
7.	"Let's Stick Together" (Bryan Ferry, from Let's Stick Together, 1976)	Wilbert Harrison	2:59
8.	"Smoke Gets in Your Eyes" (Bryan Ferry, from Another Time, Another Place, 1974)	Jerome Kern, Otto Harbach	2:53
9.	"Love Is the Drug" (Roxy Music, from Siren, 1975)	Ferry, Andy Mackay	4:04
10.	"Sign of the Times" (Bryan Ferry, from The Bride Stripped Bare, 1978)		2:28
11.	"Dance Away" (Roxy Music, from Manifesto, 1979)		3:44
12.	"Angel Eyes" (edit) (Roxy Music, from Manifesto, 1979)	Ferry, Mackay	2:51
13.	"Oh Yeah" (edit) (Roxy Music, from Flesh + Blood, 1980)		4:36
14.	"Over You" (Roxy Music, from Flesh + Blood, 1980)	Ferry, Phil Manzanera	3:26
15.	"Same Old Scene" (Roxy Music, from Flesh + Blood, 1980)		3:58
16.	"In the Midnight Hour" (Roxy Music, from Flesh + Blood, 1980)	Wilson Pickett, Steve Cropper	3:08
17.	"More Than This" (edit) (Roxy Music, from Avalon, 1982)		4:10
18.	"Avalon" (Roxy Music, from Avalon, 1982)		4:16
19.	"Slave to Love" (Bryan Ferry, from Boys and Girls, 1985)		4:17
20.	"Jealous Guy" (edit) (Roxy Music, non-album single, 1981)	John Lennon	4:55
Total length:			73:55

== Charts ==
=== Weekly charts ===
Weekly chart performance for Street Life: 20 Great Hits
Chart (1986–1989)	Peak position
Australian Albums (Kent Music Report)	2
Austrian Albums (Ö3 Austria)	23
Dutch Albums (Album Top 100)	10
European Albums (Music & Media)	10
German Albums (Offizielle Top 100)	14
New Zealand Albums (RMNZ)	1
Swiss Albums (Schweizer Hitparade)	14
UK Albums (OCC)	1
US Billboard 200	100

=== Year-end charts ===
Year-end chart performance for Street Life: 20 Great Hits
Chart (1986)	Position
Australian Albums (Kent Music Report)	48
Dutch Albums (Album Top 100)	47
European Albums (Music & Media)	43
New Zealand Albums (RMNZ)	22
UK Albums (Gallup)	18

== Certifications ==
Certifications for Street Life: 20 Great Hits
Region	Certification	Certified units/sales
New Zealand (RMNZ)	Platinum	15,000^{^}
United Kingdom (BPI)	Platinum	300,000^{^}
^{^} Shipments figures based on certification alone.
