= More than This (compilation album) =

Compilation album by Bryan Ferry + Roxy Music
- Released: 30 October 1995 (UK); 5 October 1999 (US)
- Recorded: 1972–1994
- Genres: Glam rock; pop rock; new wave
- Length: 78:46
- Label: Virgin
- Producers: Peter Sinfield; Bryan Ferry; John Porter; John Punter; Chris Thomas; Roxy Music; Rhett Davies; Patrick Leonard; Chester Kamen; Robin Trower

Bryan Ferry + Roxy Music chronology
Heart Still Beating (1990)	More than This (1995)	The Thrill of It All (1995)

Professional ratings
Review scores
Source	Rating
AllMusic	4/5 stars
Pitchfork Media	(6.7/10)

More than This: The Best of Bryan Ferry and Roxy Music is a 1995 compilation album covering the band Roxy Music and the solo career of their lead vocalist, Bryan Ferry. The name of the album is taken from the song "More than This" from Roxy Music's eighth and final studio album Avalon (1982).

== Track listing ==
UK version

All tracks written by Bryan Ferry, except where noted.

No.	Title	Writer(s)	Origin	Length
1.	"Virginia Plain" (Roxy Music)		Roxy Music, 1972	2:56
2.	"A Hard Rain's a-Gonna Fall" (Bryan Ferry)	Bob Dylan	These Foolish Things, 1973	4:15
3.	"Street Life" (Roxy Music)		Stranded, 1973	3:29
4.	"These Foolish Things" (Bryan Ferry)	Eric Maschwitz; Jack Strachey	These Foolish Things	4:49
5.	"Love Is the Drug" (Roxy Music)	Ferry; Andy MacKay	Siren, 1975	4:07
6.	"Smoke Gets in Your Eyes" (Bryan Ferry)	Jerome Kern; Otto Harbach	Another Time, Another Place, 1974	2:53
7.	"Dance Away" (Roxy Music)		Manifesto, 1979	3:44
8.	"Let's Stick Together" (Bryan Ferry)	Wilbert Harrison	Let's Stick Together, 1976	2:59
9.	"Angel Eyes" (Roxy Music)	Ferry; Mackay	Manifesto	2:51
10.	"Slave to Love" (Bryan Ferry)		Boys and Girls, 1985	4:17
11.	"Oh Yeah" (Roxy Music)		Flesh + Blood, 1980	4:36
12.	"Don't Stop the Dance" (Bryan Ferry)	Ferry; Rhett Davies	Boys and Girls	4:20
13.	"Same Old Scene" (Roxy Music)		Flesh + Blood	3:58
14.	"Is Your Love Strong Enough?" (Bryan Ferry)		film soundtrack to Legend, 1986	4:56
15.	"Jealous Guy" (Roxy Music)	John Lennon	non-album single, 1981	4:56
16.	"Kiss and Tell" (Bryan Ferry)		Bête Noire, 1987	3:59
17.	"More than This" (Roxy Music)		Avalon, 1982	4:10
18.	"I Put a Spell on You" (Bryan Ferry)	Screamin' Jay Hawkins	Taxi, 1993	3:54
19.	"Avalon" (Roxy Music)		Avalon	4:16
20.	"Your Painted Smile" (Bryan Ferry)		Mamouna, 1994	3:13
Total length:				78:46

Note

- For the 1997 Japan release, "I Put a Spell on You" was replaced by "Tokyo Joe" (writer: Ferry; from the Bryan Ferry album In Your Mind, 1977).
- The 1999 US & Canada release omits both "Is Your Love Strong Enough?" and "Your Painted Smile", and adds "I'm in the Mood for Love" as the final track (writer: Jimmy McHugh / Dorothy Fields; from the Bryan Ferry album As Time Goes By, 1999).

== Personnel ==
Adapted from the liner notes for the UK version of the album.

=== Production ===
- Track 1 produced by Peter Sinfield
- Tracks 2 & 4 produced by Bryan Ferry, John Porter & John Punter
- Tracks 3 & 5 produced by Chris Thomas
- Track 6 produced by Bryan Ferry & John Punter
- Tracks 7 & 9 produced by Roxy Music
- Track 8 produced by Bryan Ferry & Chris Thomas
- Tracks 10, 12 & 14 produced by Bryan Ferry & Rhett Davies
- Tracks 11, 13, 15, 17 & 19 produced by Roxy Music & Rhett Davies
- Track 16 produced by Bryan Ferry, Patrick Leonard & Chester Kamen
- Tracks 18 & 20 produced by Bryan Ferry & Robin Trower
- Tapes re-mastered by Bob Ludwig
- Simon Puxley – consultant

=== Album packaging ===
- Bryan Ferry, Nick de Ville, Bogdan Zarkowski – design
- Nick Knight – photography
- Isabella Blow – stylist
- Honor Fraser – model
- Colin Roy – hair
- Val Garland – make-up
- Hat by Philip Treacy
- Gown by Valentino
- Mark Powell – tailor
- Corset by Mr. Pearl at Erickson Beamon
- Jewellery courtesy of SJ Phillips of Bond Street

== Charts ==
Chart performance for More than This
Chart (1995–2026)	Peak position
Australian Albums (ARIA)	9
German Albums (Offizielle Top 100)	91
Greek Albums (IFPI)	8
Norwegian Albums (VG-lista)	4
New Zealand Albums (RMNZ)	23
Swedish Albums (Sverigetopplistan)	31
UK Albums (Official Charts)	15

== Certifications ==
Region	Certification	Certified units/sales
United Kingdom (BPI)	Platinum	300,000^{^}
Summaries
Worldwide	—	500,000
^{^} Shipments figures based on certification alone.
