= The Ultimate Collection (Bryan Ferry and Roxy Music album) =

Greatest hits album by Bryan Ferry with Roxy Music
- Released: 7 November 1988
- Recorded: 1974–1986
- Genre: Glam rock; art rock; pop rock; new wave
- Label: E.G.

Bryan Ferry chronology
Bête Noire (1987)	The Ultimate Collection (1988)	Taxi (1993)

Roxy Music chronology
Street Life: 20 Great Hits (1986)	The Ultimate Collection (1988)	Heart Still Beating (1990)

The Ultimate Collection is a greatest hits album by Bryan Ferry and Roxy Music, released on 7 November 1988 by E.G. Records.

Unlike the 1986 compilation album Street Life, which was predominantly Roxy Music material, The Ultimate Collection focuses more on Ferry's solo career. It includes the previously unreleased track "He'll Have to Go", a leftover from the 1977 sessions for the album The Bride Stripped Bare, which was also released as a single in 1989, and the track "Help Me," which Ferry recorded for the soundtrack to the 1986 film The Fly, and had been released as a single in the US that year but was unreleased in the UK until this album.

The album peaked at number six on the UK Albums Chart and has been certified triple platinum by the British Phonographic Industry (BPI).

== Track listing ==
All songs written by Bryan Ferry, except where noted.

1. Bryan Ferry: "Let's Stick Together ('88 remix)" (Wilbert Harrison) – 2:55 (original version from Let's Stick Together, 1976)
2. Bryan Ferry: "The 'In' Crowd" (Billy Page) – 4:34 (from Another Time, Another Place, 1974)
3. Roxy Music: "Dance Away" – 3:45 (from Manifesto, 1979)
4. Roxy Music: "Angel Eyes" (Bryan Ferry, Andy Mackay) (edit) – 3:06 (from Manifesto, 1979)
5. Bryan Ferry: "He'll Have to Go" (Joe & Audrey Allison) – 4:03 (previously unreleased, recorded 1977)
6. Bryan Ferry: "Tokyo Joe" – 3:54 (from In Your Mind, 1977)
7. Roxy Music: "All I Want Is You" – 2:51 (from Country Life, 1974)
8. Roxy Music: "Jealous Guy" (John Lennon) – 6:12 (single release, 1981)
9. Bryan Ferry: "The Price of Love" (Don & Phil Everly) – 3:24 (from Let's Stick Together, 1976)
10. Bryan Ferry: "Don't Stop the Dance" (Bryan Ferry, Rhett Davies) – 4:20 (from Boys and Girls, 1985)
11. Roxy Music: "Love Is the Drug" (Bryan Ferry, Andy Mackay) – 4:04 (from Siren, 1975)
12. Bryan Ferry: "This Is Tomorrow" – 3:35 (from In Your Mind, 1977)
13. Bryan Ferry: "Slave to Love" – 4:27 (from Boys and Girls, 1985)
14. Bryan Ferry: "Help Me" (Bryan Ferry, Nile Rodgers) – 4:37 (US-only single release, 1986)
15. Roxy Music: "Avalon" – 4:14 (from Avalon, 1982)
16. Roxy Music: "More than This" – 4:30 (Bonus track on the M6 interaction 1994 re-release, from Avalon, 1982)

Note: Some versions of the CD contain alternate ordering of the tracks, with "Dance Away" appearing as track 15 instead of track 3.

== Charts ==
=== Weekly charts ===
Weekly chart performance for The Ultimate Collection
Chart (1988–1989)	Peak position
Australian Albums (Australian Music Report)	9
European Albums (Music & Media)	21
German Albums (Offizielle Top 100)	43
New Zealand Albums (RMNZ)	15
Swedish Albums (Sverigetopplistan)	23
UK Albums (OCC)	6

=== Year-end charts ===
1988 year-end chart performance for The Ultimate Collection
Chart (1988)	Position
UK Albums (Gallup)	32

1989 year-end chart performance for The Ultimate Collection
Chart (1989)	Position
UK Albums (Gallup)	100

== Certifications ==
Certifications for The Ultimate Collection
Region	Certification	Certified units/sales
Australia (ARIA)	2× Platinum	140,000^{^}
France (SNEP)	Gold	100,000^{*}
United Kingdom (BPI)	3× Platinum	900,000^{^}
^{*} Sales figures based on certification alone.^{^} Shipments figures based on certification alone.
