= Live (Roxy Music album) =

Live album by Roxy Music
- Released: 2 June 2003
- Recorded: 17 June – 2 October 2001
- Genre: Art rock, glam rock, new wave, new romanticism
- Label: Eagle
- Producer: Rhett Davies, Roxy Music

Roxy Music chronology
Concerto (2001)	Live (2003)

Live is a double live album by English art rock band Roxy Music, released in 2003. Their fourth official live album, it contains performances from a variety of venues on their 2001 reunion world tour, and represents the entire set list from those concerts. Live was packaged in a Digipak case.

== Critical reception ==
Professional ratings
Review scores
Source	Rating
AllMusic	4.5/5 stars
bbc.co.uk	(4/5)

On AllMusic Sean Westergaard wrote: "This set should impress those unfamiliar with Roxy and will surely thrill longtime fans. It's a fine testament to this band that these songs sound timeless rather than dated nearly 30 years down the line in many cases. After nearly two decades away, Roxy Music prove that they still have plenty of style and plenty of substance".

On bbc.co.uk, Nigel Bell stated: "Roxy's reunion might have been short lived (who knows?) but this is evidence that the band members can still compete with their younger upstarts".

Uncut magazine wrote the following: "Brian Eno's sniffy dismissal of his former colleagues' decision to regroup for this 2001 tour was soon retracted. No wonder—from the adrenalised rampage of the opening "Re-make/Re-model" to the dazed wonder of the final "For Your Pleasure", this two-CD features Roxy sounding as good if not better than ever. Eno or no Eno. The song choices are faultless, Ferry shimmers like a wounded apparition on "Every Dream Home", and elsewhere he's a riot of swooning romance and slick-backed menace. They still capture the giddy thrall of future pop perfection like no other outfit before or since. The strangely unadvertised original drummer, Paul Thompson, remains the devastating powerhouse helping them reach places beyond other bands' comprehension. Unfeasibly brilliant, dare they now chance a full-scale new album reunion? It would need to be very good not to sour these memories."

== Track listing ==
=== Disc one ===
No.	Title	Length
1.	"Re-Make/Re-Model" (2001-07–29th; Pine Knob, Detroit)	4:28
2.	"Street Life" (2001-09–19th; Sporthalle, Hamburg)	2:28
3.	"Ladytron" (2001-09–24th; Forum, Milan)	5:02
4.	"While My Heart Is Still Beating" (2001-09–29th; S.E.C.C., Glasgow)	4:50
5.	"Out of the Blue" (2001-09–28th; E.N. Arena, Manchester)	4:21
6.	"A Song for Europe" (2001-08–19th; Ent. Centre, Perth)	8:09
7.	"My Only Love" (2001-09–22nd; Schleyerhalle, Stuttgart)	8:25
8.	"In Every Dream Home a Heartache" (2001-09–14th; Sportspaleis, Antwerp)	6:18
9.	"Oh Yeah" (2001-07–29th; Pine Knob, Detroit)	4:21
10.	"Both Ends Burning" (2001-09–24th; Forum, Milan)	6:06
11.	"Tara" (2001-07–16th; Air Canada Centre, Toronto)	3:27

=== Disc two ===
No.	Title	Length
1.	"More than This" (2001-09–07th; Int. Forum, Tokyo)	3:55
2.	"If There Is Something" (2001-06–17th; N.E.C., Birmingham)	5:54
3.	"Mother of Pearl" (2001-09–26th; Gasometer, Vienna)	6:10
4.	"Avalon" (2001-10–02nd; Apollo, London)	4:20
5.	"Dance Away" (2001-08–17th; Ent. Centre, Adelaide)	3:51
6.	"Jealous Guy" (2001-06–17th; N.E.C., Birmingham)	5:25
7.	"Editions of You" (2001-08–19th; Ent. Centre, Perth)	3:47
8.	"Virginia Plain" (2001-09–22nd; Schleyerhalle, Stuttgart)	3:01
9.	"Love Is the Drug" (2001-08–19th; Ent. Centre, Perth)	3:48
10.	"Do the Strand" (2001-08–03rd; G.M.P., Vancouver)	3:50
11.	"For Your Pleasure" (2001-08–17th; Ent. Centre, Adelaide)	6:41

== Personnel ==
Roxy Music

- Bryan Ferry – lead vocals, piano
- Andy MacKay – saxophone, oboe, backing vocals
- Phil Manzanera – lead guitar, additional backing vocals
- Paul Thompson – drums

with:

- Chris Spedding – guitar
- Colin Good – piano, backing vocals, musical director
- Zev Katz – bass
- Lucy Wilkins – violin, keyboards, backing vocals
- Julia Thornton – percussion, keyboards, backing vocals
- Sarah Brown – backing vocals
- Yanick Étienne – backing vocals
- Michelle John – backing vocals
- Sharon White – backing vocals

=== Production ===
- Produced by Rhett Davies and Roxy Music.
- Assistant Producer: Colin Good
- Mixed by: Bob Clearmountain at Mix This!
- Assistant: Kevin Harp
- Mastered by: Bob Ludwig
- Studio One Engineer: Michael Boddy
- FOH Sound Engineer: Levi Tecofski
- Monitor Engineer: Steve May & Tim Paterson (Europe)
- Sound Technician: Mike Hackman
- Recorded on: Mackie HDR
- Designed by: Bogdan Zarkowski and Bryan Ferry.
- Photography: Steve Jennings, Harris Montague, Colin Roy, Diana Scrimgeour, Fiona Volquardsen, Bogdan Zarkowski.
- Sleeve Notes: Michael Bracewell
- Album Co-ordination: Jim Lawn
- Thanks to: John Giddings, Mick Green, Ronnie Harris, Robert Lee, Juliet Mann, Johnson Somerset, Katie Turner, Hohner.

== Charts ==
Chart (2003)	Peak position
German Albums (Offizielle Top 100)	100
UK Independent Albums (OCC)	18
