= The Atlantic Years 1973–1980 =

Compilation album by Roxy Music
- Released: 1983
- Labels: Polydor; E.G.; Atco
- Producers: Roxy Music; Rhett Davies; Chris Thomas

Roxy Music chronology
The High Road (1983)	The Atlantic Years 1973–1980 (1983)	Street Life: 20 Great Hits (1986)

Professional ratings
Review scores
Source	Rating
AllMusic	3/5 stars
Christgau's Record Guide	B+

The Atlantic Years 1973–1980 is a compilation album by the English rock band Roxy Music, released in 1983 by Polydor Records/E.G. Records in the United Kingdom and Atco Records in the United States. It contains selected singles and album tracks from four Roxy Music studio albums: For Your Pleasure (1973), Siren (1975), Manifesto (1979) and Flesh and Blood (1980).

== Track listing ==
All tracks written by Bryan Ferry, except where noted.

No.	Title	Writer(s)	Original album	Length
1.	"Dance Away" (single version)		Manifesto	3:45
2.	"Angel Eyes" (single version)	Ferry; Andy Mackay	Manifesto	3:05
3.	"Over You"	Ferry; Phil Manzanera	Flesh and Blood	3:30
4.	"Love Is the Drug"	Ferry; Mackay	Siren	4:05
5.	"Oh Yeah"		Flesh and Blood	4:50
6.	"Ain't That So"		Manifesto	5:39
7.	"My Only Love"		Flesh and Blood	5:00
8.	"In the Midnight Hour"	Wilson Pickett; Steve Cropper	Flesh and Blood	3:11
9.	"Still Falls the Rain"	Ferry; Manzanera	Manifesto	4:11
10.	"Do the Strand"		For Your Pleasure	4:00

== Production ==
Adapted from the album's liner notes.

- Tracks 1, 2, 6 & 9 produced by Roxy Music
- Tracks 3, 7 & 8 produced by Roxy Music with Rhett Davies
- Tracks 4, 5 & 10 produced by Roxy Music with Chris Thomas

== Charts ==
Chart performance for The Atlantic Years 1973–1980
Chart (1983)	Peak position
Australian Albums (ARIA)	60
Canada Top Albums/CDs (RPM)	88
Dutch Albums (Album Top 100)	46
German Albums (Offizielle Top 100)	62
New Zealand Albums (RMNZ)	31
UK Albums (Official Charts)	23
US Billboard 200	183
