= Heart Still Beating =

Live album by Roxy Music
- Released: 22 October 1990
- Recorded: 27 August 1982
- Venue: Arènes de Fréjus (Fréjus)
- Genre: Art rock; glam rock; pop rock; new wave
- Length: 67:52
- Label: Virgin Records (UK); Reprise Records (North America)
- Producer: Bob Clearmountain and Rhett Davies

Roxy Music chronology
The Ultimate Collection (1988)	Heart Still Beating (1990)	More than This (1995)

Professional ratings
Review scores
Source	Rating
AllMusic	2.5/5 stars
Entertainment Weekly	B

Heart Still Beating is the third live album by the English rock band Roxy Music and was released on 22 October 1990. It is credited as a recording of a concert in Fréjus, France on 27 August 1982, as part of their tour to promote the band's final studio album, Avalon. The album cover photograph features model Amanda Cazalet.

The Fréjus concert was filmed by Robin Nash for the BBC and released on home video in 1983 under the title The High Road, with songs in a different sequence. However, the album The High Road, also released in 1983, consists of audio recordings from a different night of the tour, in Glasgow, Scotland on 30 October 1982. The High Road album went out of print by 1990, being replaced by Heart Still Beating, which edits together both concerts.

King Crimson's set, who supported Roxy Music on this tour, was also filmed and officially released.

== Track listing ==
All tracks are written by Bryan Ferry, unless otherwise noted.

No.	Title	Writer(s)	Length
1.	"India"		0:53
2.	"Can't Let Go"		5:20
3.	"While My Heart Is Still Beating"	Ferry; Andy Mackay	3:52
4.	"Out of the Blue"	Ferry; Phil Manzanera	4:26
5.	"Dance Away"		3:45
6.	"Impossible Guitar"	Manzanera	3:41
7.	"A Song for Europe"	Ferry; Mackay	6:27
8.	"Love Is the Drug"	Ferry; Mackay	3:52
9.	"Like a Hurricane"	Neil Young	7:43
10.	"My Only Love"		7:16
11.	"Both Ends Burning"		5:32
12.	"Avalon"		4:23
13.	"Editions of You"		4:10
14.	"Jealous Guy"	John Lennon	6:32
Total length:			67:52

== Personnel ==
Roxy Music

- Bryan Ferry - vocals, keyboards
- Andy Mackay - saxophone, oboe
- Phil Manzanera - guitar

Touring personnel

- Guy Fletcher - keyboards
- Neil Hubbard - guitar
- Jimmy Maelen - percussion
- Andy Newmark - drums
- Alan Spenner - bass
- Fonzi Thornton, Michelle Cobbs, Tawatha Agee - backing vocals

== Charts ==
Chart (1990)	Peak position
Dutch Albums (Album Top 100)	78
