= Is Your Love Strong Enough =

Is Your Love Strong Enough may refer to:

- "Is Your Love Strong Enough", song written by Bryan Ferry from Legend (Tangerine Dream soundtrack), also from More than This (compilation album)
- "Is Your Love Strong Enough", cover of the Bryan Ferry song from The Girl with the Dragon Tattoo (2011 film) soundtrack by How To Destroy Angels
- "Is Your Love Strong Enough", song from Pop Life (Bananarama album) written Dallin and Jolley
