= The Thrill of It All (Roxy Music album) =

Box set by Roxy Music
- Released: 20 November 1995
- Recorded: 1972–1982
- Genres: Glam rock; art rock
- Length: 310:55
- Label: Virgin
- Producer: varies from track to track

Roxy Music chronology
| More than This (1995) | The Thrill of It All (1995) | Concert Classics (1998) |

Professional ratings
Review scores
| Source | Rating |
|---|---|
| AllMusic | 4.5/5 stars |

The Thrill of It All is a four-CD compilation box set by the English band Roxy Music, released by Virgin in 1995. The first three discs of the set collect key album tracks from the band's eight studio albums. The fourth disc consists of a selection of singles, B-sides and remixes. Many of the B-sides were composed by other members of the band as Bryan Ferry wanted each member of the band to benefit from songwriting royalties. The release features no previously unreleased tracks, though it was the first time some tracks were released on compact disc. The set was remastered by Robert Ludwig who subsequently did the 1999 remasters for the Roxy Music catalogue.

== Track listing ==
All tracks are written by Bryan Ferry, except where noted.

Disc one
| No. | Title | Writer(s) | Origin | Length |
|---|---|---|---|---|
| 1. | "Re-Make/Re-Model" | | Roxy Music, 1972 | 5:14 |
| 2. | "Ladytron" | | Roxy Music | 4:26 |
| 3. | "If There Is Something" | | Roxy Music | 6:34 |
| 4. | "2HB" | | Roxy Music | 4:30 |
| 5. | "Chance Meeting" | | Roxy Music | 3:08 |
| 6. | "Sea Breezes" | | Roxy Music | 7:03 |
| 7. | "Do the Strand" | | For Your Pleasure, 1973 | 4:04 |
| 8. | "Beauty Queen" | | For Your Pleasure | 4:41 |
| 9. | "Strictly Confidential" | | For Your Pleasure | 3:48 |
| 10. | "Editions of You" | | For Your Pleasure | 3:51 |
| 11. | "In Every Dream Home a Heartache" | | For Your Pleasure | 5:29 |
| 12. | "The Bogus Man" | | For Your Pleasure | 9:20 |
| 13. | "For Your Pleasure" | | For Your Pleasure | 6:51 |
| 14. | "Street Life" | | Stranded, 1973 | 3:29 |
| 15. | "Just Like You" | | Stranded | 3:36 |
| 16. | "Amazona" | Ferry, Phil Manzanera | Stranded | 4:16 |

Disc two
| No. | Title | Writer(s) | Origin | Length |
|---|---|---|---|---|
| 1. | "A Song for Europe" | Ferry, Andy Mackay | Stranded | 5:46 |
| 2. | "Mother of Pearl" | | Stranded | 6:52 |
| 3. | "Sunset" | | Stranded | 6:04 |
| 4. | "The Thrill of It All" | | Country Life, 1974 | 6:24 |
| 5. | "Three and Nine" | Ferry, Mackay | Country Life | 4:04 |
| 6. | "All I Want Is You" | | Country Life | 2:53 |
| 7. | "Out of the Blue" | Ferry, Manzanera | Country Life | 4:46 |
| 8. | "Bitter-Sweet" | Ferry, Mackay | Country Life | 4:50 |
| 9. | "Casanova" | | Country Life | 3:27 |
| 10. | "A Really Good Time" | | Country Life | 3:45 |
| 11. | "Prairie Rose" | Ferry, Manzanera | Country Life | 5:12 |
| 12. | "Love Is the Drug" | Ferry, Mackay | Siren, 1975 | 4:11 |
| 13. | "Sentimental Fool" | Ferry, Mackay | Siren | 6:14 |
| 14. | "Could It Happen to Me?" | | Siren | 3:36 |
| 15. | "Both Ends Burning" | | Siren | 5:16 |
| 16. | "Just Another High" | | Siren | 6:31 |

Disc three
| No. | Title | Writer(s) | Origin | Length |
|---|---|---|---|---|
| 1. | "Manifesto" | Ferry, Manzanera | Manifesto, 1979 | 5:29 |
| 2. | "Trash" | Ferry, Manzanera | Manifesto | 2:14 |
| 3. | "Angel Eyes" | Ferry, Mackay | Manifesto | 3:32 |
| 4. | "Stronger Through the Years" | | Manifesto | 6:16 |
| 5. | "Ain't That So" | | Manifesto | 5:39 |
| 6. | "Dance Away" | | Manifesto | 4:21 |
| 7. | "Oh Yeah" | | Flesh and Blood, 1980 | 4:51 |
| 8. | "Same Old Scene" | | Flesh and Blood | 3:57 |
| 9. | "Flesh + Blood" | | Flesh and Blood | 3:08 |
| 10. | "My Only Love" | | Flesh and Blood | 5:16 |
| 11. | "Over You" | Ferry, Manzanera | Flesh and Blood | 3:27 |
| 12. | "No Strange Delight" | Ferry, Manzanera | Flesh and Blood | 4:44 |
| 13. | "More Than This" | | Avalon, 1982 | 4:30 |
| 14. | "Avalon" | | Avalon | 4:16 |
| 15. | "While My Heart Is Still Beating" | Ferry, Mackay | Avalon | 3:26 |
| 16. | "Take a Chance with Me" | Ferry, Manzanera | Avalon | 4:42 |
| 17. | "To Turn You On" | | Avalon | 4:16 |
| 18. | "Tara" | Ferry, Mackay | Avalon | 1:43 |

Disc four (Rarities)
| No. | Title | Writer(s) | Origin | Length |
|---|---|---|---|---|
| 1. | "Virginia Plain" | | non-album single, 1972 | 2:56 |
| 2. | "The Numberer" | Mackay | "Virginia Plain" single | 2:56 |
| 3. | "Pyjamarama" | | non-album single, 1973 | 3:00 |
| 4. | "The Pride and the Pain" | Mackay | "Pyjamarama" single, 1973 | 4:14 |
| 5. | "Manifesto" (1980 re-recording) | Ferry, Manzanera | "Over You" single, 1980 | 4:00 |
| 6. | "Hula Kula" | Manzanera | "Street Life" single, 1973 | 2:37 |
| 7. | "Trash 2" | Ferry, Manzanera | "Trash" single, 1979 | 3:09 |
| 8. | "Your Application's Failed" | Paul Thompson | "All I Want is You" single, 1974 | 4:45 |
| 9. | "Lover" | Ferry, Manzanera | "Same Old Scene" single, 1980 | 4:26 |
| 10. | "Sultanesque" | | "Love Is the Drug" single, 1975 | 5:21 |
| 11. | "Dance Away" (12-inch single extended remix) | | "Dance Away" single, 1979 | 6:29 |
| 12. | "South Downs" | | "Oh Yeah" single, 1980 | 5:10 |
| 13. | "Angel Eyes" (12-inch single extended remix) | Ferry, Mackay | "Angel Eyes" single, 1979 | 6:37 |
| 14. | "Always Unknowing" | | "Avalon" single, 1982 | 5:21 |
| 15. | "The Main Thing" (12-inch single extended remix) | | "Take a Chance with Me" single, 1982 | 7:41 |
| 16. | "India" | | Avalon; also "More Than This" single, 1982 | 1:46 |
| 17. | "Jealous Guy" (extended version) | John Lennon | non-album single, 1980 | 6:11 |
