= Concert Classics =

Concert Classics may refer to:

- Concert Classics (Roxy Music album)
- Concert Classics (Strawbs album)
- Concert Classics, Vol. 4, by UK
- Concert Classics, by the Ozark Mountain Daredevils
