= Concert Classics (Roxy Music album) =

Live album by Roxy Music
- Released: February 1998
- Recorded: April 12, 1979
- Genre: Art rock
- Length: 63:43
- Label: Ranch Life
- Producer: Steve Weiner

Roxy Music chronology
The Thrill of It All (1995)	Concert Classics (1998)	The Best of Roxy Music (2001)

Professional ratings
Review scores
Source	Rating
AllMusic	4/5 stars

Concert Classics is a live album by Roxy Music. All tracks were recorded during the group's "Manifesto Tour" at the Rainbow Music Hall, Denver, Colorado on April 12, 1979. The album was released nineteen years later in February, 1998, and released again in 2001 with two extra tracks, under the name Concerto. Roxy Music had no input to this album as it is not an official Roxy Music release but released under license.

== Track listing ==
All tracks by Bryan Ferry except where noted.

1. "Manifesto" (Ferry, Phil Manzanera) – 5:39
2. "Angel Eyes" (Ferry, Andy MacKay) – 3:57
3. "Trash" (Ferry, Manzanera) – 2:54
4. "Out of the Blue" (Ferry, Manzanera) – 5:18
5. "A Song for Europe" (Ferry, MacKay) – 6:25
6. "Still Falls the Rain" (Ferry, Manzanera) – 4:29
7. "Ain't that so " (Ferry, Manzanera) – 5:55
8. "Stronger Through the Years" – 8:23
9. "Ladytron" – 5:29
10. "In Every Dreamhome a Heartache" – 9:06
11. "Love Is the Drug" (Ferry, MacKay) – 3:50
12. "Do the Strand" – 4:08
13. "Re-make/Re-model" – 4:05

== Personnel ==
Roxy Music

- Bryan Ferry – lead vocals, keyboards
- Andy MacKay – saxophones
- Phil Manzanera – lead guitar
- Paul Thompson – drums

Additional musicians

- David Skinner – keyboards, piano
- Gary Tibbs – bass

=== Production ===
- Norm Simmer – engineer
- Steve Weiner – producer
- John W. Edwards – executive producer
