= The Atlantic Years =

The Atlantic Years may refer to various compilation albums and videos.

Compilation albums

- The Art of John Coltrane: The Atlantic Years by John Coltrane, 1973
- The Atlantic Years 1973–1980 by Roxy Music, 1983
- The Atlantic Years by Emerson, Lake & Palmer, 1992
- The Best of Ray Charles: The Atlantic Years by Ray Charles, 1994
- The Best of The Lemonheads: The Atlantic Years by The Lemonheads, 1998
- Melvinmania: Best of the Atlantic Years 1993–1996 by Melvins, 2003
- Greatest Hits: The Atlantic Years by P.O.D., 2006

Videos

- Videos from the Cellar: The Atlantic Years by Ratt, 2007
