= Concerto (Roxy Music album) =

Live album by Roxy Music
- Released: June 12, 2001
- Recorded: April 1979
- Genre: Glam rock, art rock, pop rock, new wave
- Length: 79:56
- Label: Burning Airlines
- Producer: Steve Weiner

Roxy Music chronology
The Best of Roxy Music (2001)	Concerto (2001)	Live (2003)

Professional ratings
Review scores
Source	Rating
AllMusic	3.5/5 stars

Concerto is a live album by Roxy Music. All tracks were recorded during the group's "Manifesto Tour" at the Rainbow Music Hall, Denver, Colorado on April 12, 1979, except for Mother of Pearl and Editions of You, which were recorded earlier that month at the Oakland Auditorium, Oakland, California. The album was released in 2001; three years after it was previously released as Concert Classics in 1998 (which does not include the final two tracks). It was released again (with the same track listing) under the title Ladytron on August 19, 2002, on Superior Records. Roxy Music had no input to this album as it is not an official Roxy Music release but released under license.

== Track listing ==
All tracks by Bryan Ferry except where noted.

1. "Manifesto" (Ferry, Phil Manzanera) – 5:39
2. "Angel Eyes" (Ferry, Andy Mackay) – 3:57
3. "Trash" (Ferry, Manzanera) – 2:54
4. "Out of the Blue" (Ferry, Manzanera) – 5:18
5. "A Song for Europe" (Ferry, Mackay) – 6:25
6. "Still Falls the Rain" (Ferry, Manzanera) – 4:29
7. "Ain't That So" – 5:55
8. "Stronger Through the Years" – 8:23
9. "Ladytron" – 5:29
10. "In Every Dream Home a Heartache" – 9:06
11. "Love Is the Drug" (Ferry, Mackay) – 3:50
12. "Do the Strand" – 4:08
13. "Re-make/Re-model" – 4:05
14. "Mother of Pearl" – 6:43*
15. "Editions of You" – 3:43*
- Recorded Oakland, CA

== Personnel ==
Roxy Music

- Bryan Ferry – lead vocals, keyboards
- Andy Mackay – saxophone, oboe, synthesizer
- Phil Manzanera – guitars
- Paul Thompson – drums, percussion

Additional musicians

- Dave Skinner – keyboards, backing vocals
- Gary Tibbs – bass, backing vocals

Technical

- John W. Edwards – compilation production, mastering
- Carlton P. Sandercock – project coordinator
