= A Hard Rain's a-Gonna Fall =

Song by Bob Dylan

from the album The Freewheelin' Bob Dylan
- Released: May 27, 1963
- Recorded: December 6, 1962
- Genre: Folk
- Length: 6:55
- Label: Columbia
- Songwriter: Bob Dylan
- Producer: John Hammond

Official audio
- "A Hard Rain's a-Gonna Fall" (Official Audio) on YouTube

"A Hard Rain's a-Gonna Fall" is a song written by the American singer-songwriter Bob Dylan. Mischaracterized, even by Dylan, as a response to the Cuban Missile Crisis of October 1962, he began writing it in June of 1962 and first performed it publicly that September. Its recording debut with Dylan alone on guitar and vocals was on The Freewheelin' Bob Dylan (1963).

With "Hard Rain” Dylan became both a revolutionary and a traditionalist. While owing much to Scottish ballads such as "Lord Randall", according to Dylan's close associate Dave Van Ronk, it also marked “the beginning of a revolution". Beat Generation poet Allen Ginsberg thought that with "Hard Rain", Dylan had taken up their torch. As for Dylan, he said his disparate readings, including American Civil War newspapers, Balzac, Jonathan Swift, contributed to the song’s "culture of feeling, of black days, of schism, evil for evil, the common destiny of the human being getting thrown off course. It's all one long funeral song."

== History ==
Dylan began the song in the summer of 1962 in Greenwich Village. Early versions were soon published in Sing Out! and Broadside, with slight differences: "a highway of golden", for instance, became "a highway of diamonds" in the finished song. In that September Dylan performed it at a Carnegie Hall hootenanny. One month later, on October 22, U.S. President John F. Kennedy appeared on national television to announce the discovery of Soviet missiles on the island of Cuba, initiating the Cuban Missile Crisis. On the sleeve notes on the Freewheelin' album, Nat Hentoff quoted Dylan saying he wrote "A Hard Rain's" in response to the crisis: "Every line in it is actually the start of a whole new song. But when I wrote it, I thought I wouldn't have enough time alive to write all those songs so I put all I could into this one." In actuality, Dylan had written the song more than a month before the crisis broke. The song was recorded in a single take at Columbia Records' Studio A on December 6, 1962.

== Lyrics ==
The ballad's lyrical structure is based on the question-and-answer refrain pattern of the traditional Anglo-Scottish ballad "Lord Randall", published by Francis Child. The lyrics are presented in five stanzas each of which places an opening 'question' in two verses, followed by several verses in 'answer', and closing with a two line refrain reciting the lyrics in the title. For example, the first stanza starts by asking the 'question': "Oh, where have you been, my blue-eyed son?/ Oh, where have you been, my darling young one?" This is followed by an 'answer' in five verses:

I've stumbled on the side of twelve misty mountains
I've walked and I've crawled on six crooked highways
I've stepped in the middle of seven sad forests
I've been out in front of a dozen dead oceans
I've been ten thousand miles in the mouth of a graveyard

The 'answer' verses are then followed by the refrain ending with "...A hard rain's a-gonna fall." Each of the 'answers' in the separate respective stanzas contains 5 verses, 7 verses, 7 verses, 6 verses, and 12 verses. The final stanza summarizes its 'answer' in what appears as a resignation to the view of social realism where a human's experience contains its various setbacks and limitations with the verses: "And I'll tell it and think it and speak it and breathe it/ And reflect it from the mountain so all souls can see it".

== Reception and analysis ==
"A Hard Rain's a-Gonna Fall" has been described as an "anti-war anthem", a "surrealistic downpour", a "classic protest song, one filled with forebodings on war, social injustice, and other dreads", a "revelation song ... a beat-poet psalm with an end-of-times warning", and "the greatest protest song by the greatest protest songwriter of his time".

Thom Donovan wrote in 2023: "With the release of Freewheelin' in 1963, Dylan became the torch-bearer of his generation. It's the sound of Dylan riding an early crest of a wave to the height of his powers." Stephen Scobie noted that, as in many other songs written by Dylan, the narrator plays the role of a prophet. Rolling Stone wrote: "'A Hard Rain' is the first public instance of Dylan grappling with the End of Days, a topic that would come to dominate his work. But the tumbling verses of 'A Hard Rain' culminate not in catastrophe but in Dylan describing his task as an artist: to sing out against darkness wherever he sees it – to 'tell it and think it and speak it and breathe it' until his lungs burst."

In No Direction Home, Martin Scorsese's 2005 documentary on Dylan, Beat poet Allen Ginsberg talked about the first time he heard Dylan's music:

When I got back from India, and got to the West Coast, there's a poet, Charlie Plymell - at a party in Bolinas — played me a record of this new young folk singer. And I heard "Hard Rain," I think. And wept. 'Cause it seemed that the torch had been passed to another generation. From earlier bohemian, or Beat illumination. And self-empowerment.

"A Hard Rain" came at a time of heightened cold war tensions. While some have suggested that the refrain of the song refers to nuclear fallout, Dylan disputed that this was a specific reference. Rolling Stone noted that the threat of nuclear war was a theme in other songs Dylan recorded for the album, such as "Talkin' World War III Blues" and "Let Me Die in My Footsteps". According to Sean Latham, director of the Institute for Bob Dylan Studies, "'A Hard Rain' strikes so deeply because it's a song both in and about history."

In a radio interview with Studs Terkel in 1963, Dylan said:

No, it's not atomic rain, it's just a hard rain. It isn't the fallout rain. I mean some sort of end that's just gotta happen ... In the last verse, when I say, "the pellets of poison are flooding the waters", that means all the lies that people get told on their radios and in their newspapers.

Folk singer Pete Seeger interpreted the line "Where the home in the valley meets the damp dirty prison" as referring to when a young person suddenly wants to leave his home but then qualified that by saying, "People are wrong when they say 'I know what he means.'"

Evan Schlansky considered the song's surrealistic imagery a precursor to that found in later songs like "Mr. Tambourine Man" and "Desolation Row". Author Ian MacDonald referred to "A Hard Rain's a-Gonna Fall" as a "surrealistic anti-nuclear nightmare" and suggested it may possibly rival "I am the Walrus" as the most idiosyncratic protest song ever written.

== Live performances ==
Although Dylan may have first played the song to friends, "A Hard Rain's a-Gonna Fall" was formally premiered at Carnegie Hall on September 22, 1962, as part of a hootenanny organized by Pete Seeger. Seeger recalled: "I had to announce to all the singers, 'Folks, you're gonna be limited to three songs. No more. 'Cause we each have ten minutes apiece.' And Bob raised his hand and said, 'What am I supposed to do? One of my songs is ten minutes long.'"

Dylan featured the song regularly in concerts in the years since he premiered it, and there have been several dramatic performances. An October 1963 performance at Carnegie Hall was released on The Bootleg Series Vol. 7: No Direction Home, while another New York City performance, recorded one year later, appeared on The Bootleg Series Vol. 6: Bob Dylan Live 1964, Concert at Philharmonic Hall. Dylan performed the song in August 1971 at The Concert for Bangla Desh, organized by George Harrison and Ravi Shankar, for East Pakistan refugee relief (now independent Bangladesh) after the 1970 Bhola cyclone and during the 1971 Bangladesh Liberation War. On December 4, 1975, at the Forum de Montréal, Canada, Dylan recorded an upbeat version of the song, which appeared on The Bootleg Series Vol. 5: Bob Dylan Live 1975, The Rolling Thunder Revue. That rendition was featured in the 2019 Netflix documentary Rolling Thunder Revue: A Bob Dylan Story by Martin Scorsese, and it also appears on the box set The Rolling Thunder Revue: The 1975 Live Recordings, along with a November 21, 1975 performance and a still earlier rehearsal. On May 23, 1994, Dylan performed the song at "The Great Music Experience" festival in Japan, backed by a 90-piece symphony orchestra conducted by Michael Kamen. At the end of 2007, Dylan recorded a new version of "A Hard Rain's a-Gonna Fall" exclusively for the Expo 2008 Zaragoza world fair, scheduled to open on June 8, 2008, to highlight the Expo theme of "water and sustainable development". As well as choosing local-band Amaral to record a version of the song in Spanish, Dylan's new version ended with a few spoken words about his "being proud to be a part of the mission to make water safe and clean for every human being living in this world".

Patti Smith performed the song with orchestral accompaniment at the Nobel Prize Award Ceremony on December 10, 2016, to commemorate Dylan receiving the Nobel Prize in Literature. During the rendition, Smith was overcome with emotion and missed several key lines. She apologized, explained to the audience that she was nervous and asked the orchestra to repeat the section.

== Cover versions ==
"A Hard Rain's a-Gonna Fall" has been covered by many singers. Pete Seeger and Joan Baez each performed the protest song in concert many times. The most highly praised covers include ones recorded by Bryan Ferry, Patti Smith, Edie Brickell and Leon Russell. In July 2025, a tribute album was made entirely of different cover versions of the song, with performances from artists such as Ringo Starr, Willie Nelson, Iggy Pop, and the Kronos Quartet backing singer Allison Russell.

- Leon Russell's 1971 single release, from Leon Russell and the Shelter People.
- Bryan Ferry, his debut solo single from These Foolish Things (1973) reached number 10 on the UK Singles Chart in September 1973 and appeared on the compilation albums Street Life: 20 Great Hits (1986) and More Than This: The Best of Bryan Ferry (1999).
- Laura Marling covered the song in 2017 for the season four finale of Peaky Blinders.

== Other media ==
Photographer Mark Edwards took a series of photographs illustrating the lyrics of the song which were exhibited in many locations such as the United Nations headquarters. These were published in a book in 2006. The song is also mentioned prominently at the end of Haruki Murakami's novel Hard-Boiled Wonderland and the End of the World.

== See also ==
- List of Bob Dylan songs based on earlier tunes
