= Mark Powell (clothing designer) =

British fashion designer (born 1960)

Mark Powell (born November 13, 1960) is an independent British fashion designer known for his detailed biro drawings. Powell, who operates from a retail base in Newburgh Street in central London’s Soho, has been described as a contributor to British bespoke fashion. Powell's clothes have been associated with “gangster chic” and the slimmer silhouettes of the 1960s Mod movement.

== Early life ==
Powell was born in London and was raised in London's East End and Romford, Essex. His father worked in textiles, while his mother worked for the central London theatrical costumier Charles Fox. In his teens, Powell showed an interest in 1940s and 1950s style by having clothing made for himself by local tailors. In the late 1970s, he worked for the outfitter Washington Tremlett, where he learned about clothing's measure and cut.

== Design career ==
Powell later worked at retro menswear retailer Robot, managing the company’s outlet in Covent Garden's Floral Street. In 1985, Powell opened his first shop in Soho's Archer Street. Powell & Co initially sold unworn suits from the 1940s, 1950s and 1960s and then incorporated a tailoring business. Early customers included David Bowie and the incarcerated Krays.

Following the closure of Powell & Co, Powell operated from an atelier in Soho’s D'Arblay Street. At this time, he worked with Isabella Blow, who introduced Powell to Bryan Ferry. In 1995, Ferry wore one of Powell's designs on the sleeve of his compilation More Than This. Powell's suits were also worn for public events by British comedian Vic Reeves and George Michael.

Powell's suits were also worn by Bianca Jagger, and Naomi Campbell. Powell also dressed and styled George Clooney and Harrison Ford when they appeared respectively as Thomas Jefferson and Abraham Lincoln on the covers of issues of John F. Kennedy’s George magazine.

Cited in one case for his "attention to detail," Powell produced a series of collections for Marks & Spencer’s Autograph range, and collaborated with fashion brands Mulberry and Michiko Koshino. During this time, Daniel Radcliffe wore Mark Powell suits for three of the London premieres of the Harry Potter movies and British folk singer Billy Bragg wore a suit from Powell on his 2007 UK tour.

In June 2010, Powell opened the outlet Mark Powell Bespoke in Soho’s Marshall Street. Customers included Bradley Wiggins, who mentioned that he conversed with Paul Weller while they were both fitted for suits in the shop.

Powell relocated his business to the Carnaby area of Soho in spring 2020 and began using social media, as reported by Joshua Bluteau.

== Film and television ==
Powell’s clothing appeared in Julien Temple’s 1986 film Absolute Beginners, 1994’s Shopping, and 2000’s Gangster No. 1. Powell was the subject of the BBC2 documentary series Soho Stories, directed by Chris Terrill in 1996. In 2012 he appeared as a judge and mentor in the BBC3 series Young Tailor of the Year.

== Books and exhibitions ==
Powell has participated in several Department of Trade & Industry-organised international fashion shows, and staged four of his own. Two of these fashion shows took place during London Fashion Week at Savile Row restaurant Sartoria in 2001 and 2002.

A three-piece Powell suit is in the Victoria & Albert Museum's permanent collection and appeared in the museum's 1997 exhibition The Cutting Edge: Post War Fashion.

Powell also contributed garments to the British Fashion Council's 21st Century Dandy exhibition of 2003 and appeared in the accompanying book. Other books featuring Powell’s tailoring include Paul Gorman’s The Look and Sharp Suits by Eric Musgrave.
