= The High Road (Roxy Music album) =

Live album by Roxy Music
- Released: March 1983
- Recorded: 30 September 1982
- Venues: The Apollo (Glasgow, Scotland)
- Genres: Art rock; new wave
- Length: 26:38
- Labels: Polygram (UK); Warner Bros. Records (US)
- Producers: Rhett Davies; Robin Nash; Roxy Music

Roxy Music chronology
Avalon (1982)	The High Road (1983)	The Atlantic Years 1973–1980 (1983)

Professional ratings
Review scores
Source	Rating
AllMusic	3/5 stars
Rolling Stone	3/5 stars
Robert Christgau	B+

The High Road is the second live album by the English rock band Roxy Music. Recorded at the Apollo in Glasgow, Scotland on 30 September 1982 during the band's Avalon tour, it features four tracks. Two of the songs are covers, including Roxy Music's no.1 hit version of John Lennon's "Jealous Guy", and Neil Young's "Like a Hurricane". A Bryan Ferry solo effort "Can't Let Go" was also included, originally released on his 1978 album The Bride Stripped Bare, with the remaining track being a version of "My Only Love" from Flesh + Blood, with an extended instrumental section. The album reached number 26 on the UK Album Charts. and did even better in Canada, reaching #5 in May 1983.

Despite sharing the same title, there are no recordings on this album in common with the High Road videocassette/DVD, which was recorded in Fréjus, France on 27 August 1982. In 1990, the four songs from the album appeared on the band's third live album release Heart Still Beating, mixed with the rest of the songs from the Fréjus concert.

== Track listing ==
No.	Title	Writer(s)	Length
1.	"Can't Let Go"	Bryan Ferry	5:29
2.	"My Only Love"	Bryan Ferry	7:23
3.	"Like a Hurricane"	Neil Young	7:36
4.	"Jealous Guy"	John Lennon	6:10

== Personnel ==
Roxy Music

- Bryan Ferry – vocals, keyboards
- Andy Mackay – saxophone, oboe
- Phil Manzanera – guitars

Additional personnel

- Guy Fletcher – keyboards
- Neil Hubbard – guitar
- Jimmy Maelen – percussion
- Andy Newmark – drums
- Alan Spenner – bass
- Tawatha Agee – backing vocals
- Michelle Cobb – backing vocals
- Fonzi Thornton – backing vocals

== Charts ==
Chart (1983)	Peak position
Australian Albums (Kent Music Report)	13
Canada Top Albums/CDs (RPM)	5
Dutch Albums (Album Top 100)	11
German Albums (Offizielle Top 100)	25
New Zealand Albums (RMNZ)	21
Swedish Albums (Sverigetopplistan)	22
UK Albums (Official Charts)	26
US Billboard 200	67
