= Yanick Étienne =

Haitian singer (c. 1957–2022)

- Born: 1957; Haiti
- Died: 30 March 2022 (aged 64)
- Instrument: Vocals
- Label: JCP

Yanick Étienne (c. 1957 – 30 March 2022) was a Haitian singer and backing vocalist. She performed backing vocals on the hit song, "Avalon" by Roxy Music in 1982.

== Biography ==
Étienne was born in Haiti and started her recording career in 1982, performing the backing vocals on the Roxy Music song, "Avalon". She later appeared on three Bryan Ferry solo studio albums, Boys and Girls (1985), Bête Noire (1987), and Mamouna (1994).

Étienne died from cancer on 30 March 2022, at the age of 64.

== Personal life ==
Étienne was the mother of rapper and producer Dernst Emile II, better known as D'Mile.

== Discography ==
=== Solo albums ===
- Dernst Emile Presents: Yanick Etienne (1990)
- Love Songs for You (2004)
