= All I Want Is You (Roxy Music song) =

Single by Roxy Music

from the album Country Life
- B-side: "Your Application's Failed"
- Released: October 1974; EMI Studios, London
- Recorded: July–August 1974 at AIR Studios, London
- Genre: Rock; pop
- Length: 2:58
- Label: Island, Polydor
- Songwriter: Bryan Ferry
- Producers: Roxy Music, John Punter

Roxy Music singles chronology
"Street Life" (1973)	"All I Want Is You" (1974)	"The Thrill of It All" (1974)

Music video
- "All I Want Is You" on YouTube

"All I Want is You" is a single by English rock band Roxy Music, written by Bryan Ferry, and taken from their 1974 album Country Life. It reached a peak of No. 12 on the UK Official Singles Chart, in an eight-week stint on the charts. The single is also notable for its B-side, an instrumental track called "Your Application's Failed", which is the only track to date written by drummer Paul Thompson. The track was re-released on The Thrill of It All boxset.

== Reception ==
Reviewing the album Country Life for The Quietus in 2014, Ned Raggett said:

If there's a note-perfect song on a note-perfect album, though, it might have to be "All I Want Is You", three songs into the whole thing and so perfect it's no surprise Country Life almost feels front-loaded. Manzanera's introduction is a fanfare for six-string and feedback; and from there it's another quick stomper, fast and fun without being ponderous or simply skipping by, Ferry splitting the difference between main verses and breaks and making both equally memorable and immediate. There is a full instrumental section that lets everyone show off collectively, while still wrapping it up in three minutes. And all the while Ferry deliciously – there's no other word for it, he sounds like he's savouring every last syllable as he delivers it – seems to just throw out lines like, "If you ever change your mind/ I've a certain cure/ An old refrain, it lingers on/ L'amour, toujours l'amour" and "Don't want to know/ About one-night-stands/ Cut-price souvenirs/ All I want is/ The real thing/ And a night that lasts/ For years." Take it at face value, read it all as a ploy, or both, it all works, and when he bows out with "Ooo-oo, I'm all cracked up over you!" there could be no finer flourish; his heart, or something close to it, worn on his sleeve.

== Personnel ==
- Bryan Ferry – vocals, keyboards
- John Gustafson – bass
- John Wetton – bass on "Your Application's Failed"
- Edwin Jobson – strings, synthesiser, keyboards
- Andrew Mackay – oboe, saxophone
- Phil Manzanera – guitar
- Paul Thompson – drums
