= Same Old Scene =

Single by Roxy Music

from the album Flesh and Blood
- B-side: "Lover"; "Rain Rain Rain" (France); "My Only Love" (Japan, the Netherlands, New Zealand, Australia)
- Released: 31 October 1980
- Recorded: 1980
- Length: 3:57
- Label: Reprise/E.G.
- Songwriter: Bryan Ferry
- Producers: Rhett Davies, Roxy Music

Roxy Music singles chronology
"Oh Yeah" (1980)	"Same Old Scene" (1980)	"In the Midnight Hour" (1980)

Music video
- "Same Old Scene" on YouTube

"Same Old Scene" is a 1980 song recorded by the English rock band Roxy Music and written by lead singer Bryan Ferry. The song was taken from the group's number-one album Flesh and Blood, and was released as a single in late 1980. It peaked at No. 12 on the UK Singles Charts and No. 35 in Australia.

It contains a Roland CR-78 drum machine rhythm backing and intricate bass guitar work that would become ubiquitous in many Roxy Music songs that followed. "Same Old Scene" plays during both the opening and end credits of the 1980 film Times Square and is included on the film soundtrack. It also plays over the end scene and closing credits of the 2008 pilot episode for the television series Ashes to Ashes, and is featured in a party scene in the 2018 film Can You Ever Forgive Me?.

Most of the single editions had a non-LP track on the B-side called "Lover", which was notable for being one of the few Roxy Music B-sides with lyrics. "Lover" was also featured on the Miami Vice II soundtrack album in 1986, the B Side of Bryan Ferry's "The Price of Love" single in 1989, and was later included in the 1995 Roxy Music boxed set The Thrill of It All.

== Music video ==
The music video features clips of the band playing the song in a recording studio.

== Personnel ==
- Bryan Ferry – vocals, keyboards
- Phil Manzanera – guitar
- Andy Mackay – saxophone
- Alan Spenner – bass
- Allan Schwartzberg – drums

== Chart performance ==
Chart (1980–1981)	Peak position
Australia (Kent Music Report)	35
Belgium (Ultratop 50 Flanders)	27
Ireland (IRMA)	13
Netherlands (Dutch Top 40)	34
Netherlands (Single Top 100)	29
UK Singles (OCC)	12
