= Over You (Roxy Music song) =

Single by Roxy Music

from the album Flesh and Blood
- B-side: "Manifesto" (Remake)
- Released: 9 May 1980
- Recorded: 1980
- Genre: Synth-pop
- Length: 3:27
- Label: Atco; Polydor; E.G.
- Songwriters: Bryan Ferry; Phil Manzanera
- Producers: Rhett Davies; Roxy Music

Roxy Music singles chronology
"Angel Eyes" (1979)	"Over You" (1980)	"Oh Yeah" (1980)

Official audio
- "Over You" on YouTube

"Over You" is a song by the English rock band Roxy Music which was released as the lead single from their seventh studio album, Flesh and Blood (1980). "Over You" entered the UK singles chart at No. 18 before going on to reach a peak of No. 5 on June 14, 1980. The song spent a total of nine weeks on the UK Singles Chart, of which seven were in the top 20. Over you was given a silver certification from the BPI in June 1980 for sales of over 200,000 copies in the UK.

Over You was also the third and final single by Roxy Music to chart on the US Billboard Hot 100. It entered the Hot 100 at No. 84 on August 6, 1980 and peaked at No. 80 the following week.

Phil Manzanera recalls: "In 1979, I had just built my first recording studio and I rang up Bryan [Ferry] and asked if he'd like to check it out. We decided to have a jam together, Bryan on bass and me on guitar with a rhythm box. Within five minutes we had written this track and it reached number three [sic] in the charts."

In most European countries, the B-side release on the single was a re-recording of the title track of their previous studio album Manifesto (1979). The new version was a new arrangement with a shorter intro, and the lyrics were broken up into several verses, while the original was continuous. This new version was re-released on the Thrill of It All (1995) boxset as "Manifesto" (1980 re-recording).

== Personnel ==
- Bryan Ferry – vocals; keyboards; piano
- Phil Manzanera – guitar; bass
- Andy Mackay – saxophones; oboe
- Allan Schwartzberg – drums

== Charts ==
Chart (1980)	Peak position
Australia (Kent Music Report)	45
Germany (GfK)	31
Ireland (IRMA)	6
Netherlands (Dutch Top 40)	17
Netherlands (Single Top 100)	24
New Zealand (Recorded Music NZ)	24
UK Singles (Official Charts)	5
US Billboard Hot 100	80
