= Flesh and Blood (Roxy Music album) =

Studio album by Roxy Music
- Released: 23 May 1980
- Recorded: 1979–80
- Studios: Basing Street, London, UK; Gallery, Chertsey, UK; Power Station, New York City, New York, US
- Genres: Pop rock; art rock; art pop
- Length: 41:56
- Labels: E.G.; Atco/Reprise (US)
- Producers: Rhett Davies; Roxy Music

Roxy Music chronology
Manifesto (1979)	Flesh and Blood (1980)	Avalon (1982)

Singles from Flesh + Blood
- 1. "Over You" Released: May 1980; 2. "Oh Yeah" Released: July 1980; 3. "Same Old Scene" Released: October 1980; 4. "In the Midnight Hour" Released: November 1980 (US)

Flesh and Blood is the seventh studio album by the English rock band Roxy Music, released on 23 May 1980 by E.G. Records. It was an immediate commercial success, peaking at No. 1 in the UK for one week in June, and it returned to the summit in August for another three weeks, in total spending 60 weeks on the albums chart in the United Kingdom. The album also peaked at No. 35 in the United States and No. 10 in Australia.

The album was preceded by the single "Over You", a No. 5 UK hit that also provided the band with a rare US chart entry at No. 80. Two more hit singles followed: "Oh Yeah" (UK No. 5) and "Same Old Scene" (UK No. 12, AUS No. 35). Flesh + Blood also included two cover versions: the Byrds' "Eight Miles High" and Wilson Pickett's "In the Midnight Hour". The latter was released as a single in some territories. In addition, the album's title track along with the aforementioned "Over You" and "Eight Miles High" peaked at No. 46 on the Billboard dance charts.

The album was the band's first without drummer Paul Thompson, whose departure reduced Roxy Music to a core trio of singer Bryan Ferry, saxophonist Andy Mackay and guitarist Phil Manzanera, augmented by session musicians.

== Cover artwork ==
The album cover was conceived by Bryan Ferry and Antony Price, Peter Saville worked on the Typeface, and the cover was photographed by Neil Kirk. It features three young women holding javelins (two are on the front cover, one is on the back; the tip of her javelin extends through to the front cover). The cover continued the tradition for Roxy Music albums to feature images of women on the cover artwork. The model on the back cover is Roslyn Bolton (her modelling name was Ashley). The front cover models are Aimee Stephenson (at the front, died in 2002) and an unknown 18-year-old model, whom Bolton remembered years later as being named "Rachel"; Stephenson can also be seen in a 1976 Levi's Route 66 commercial.

== Critical reception ==
Professional ratings
Review scores
Source	Rating
AllMusic	3/5 stars
Robert Christgau	B
Pitchfork	6.6/10
Rolling Stone	2.5/5 stars
Smash Hits	6½/10

=== Contemporary ===
Roxy Music's seventh studio album received mixed reviews from rock critics. Ken Tucker panned it in his Rolling Stone review, "Flesh + Blood is such a shockingly bad Roxy Music record that it provokes a certain fascination. The line on early Roxy (when Eno was a member) was that the band radiated high-tech decadence, and Flesh + Blood connects with this historical interpretation by confirming the decadent part: e.g., what could be more outré right now than an art-rock disco album?." David Hepworth, writing in Smash Hits, said, "Original followers [of the band] may find it low on character and surprise while lovers of the mighty "Over You" should be suckers for its mature, silky charms."

Greil Marcus praised the album: "This record, all graceful lust and wistful regret, is pure romance; it's also the best summer music anyone's made since oil spills began undermining the concept ... Flesh + Blood floats; it drifts; it fades away; it soars back. It captures the easy, endless promises of summer, and it captures the summer you've never gotten over; it works as soothing, mindless background music, and it can break your heart. Like a perfect July day, it makes no demands on a listener, yet it can give a listener everything."

=== Legacy ===
The New Rolling Stone Record Guide give it three stars and say "Manifesto and Flesh + Blood, released after the band split up between 1976 and 1978, were good of their kind, but they lacked the spark that made some of the earlier albums so grand." Stephen Thomas Erlewine states "even the handful of undeniably strong moments can't erase the feeling that Roxy Music were beginning to run out of ideas." Pitchfork rate the record a 6.6 (the lowest of any of the studio Roxy Music albums) complaining "But the later material isn't always worthwhile. There are moments on 1980's Flesh + Blood, in particular, where the band stop sounding tired and start sounding bored, a fatal difference."

=== Singles ===
The singles released from the album have garnered more critical acclaim. The first single "Over You" is the only Roxy Music single included in Dave Marsh's The Heart of Rock & Soul: The 1001 Greatest Singles Ever Made. "Over You" is ranked at #511 in the book. Marsh writes "Roxy Music from time to time produced slices of music that were compulsively listenable, adding a dangerous groove to a fantasy Top 40 (since none of them actually reached it, in the States at least) in which such ironic distance might have actually communicated something other than the performers' feelings of inherent superiority to the genres in which they trafficked. Invariably, these pieces presented themselves as singles. Among the more memorable were "Do the Strand," and "Love is the Drug," a trenchant satire (I think) of love songs and romantic love per se. Best of all, though, was "Over You," its title a multilayered pun (which was perhaps even scatological in some dimensions), its topic an essence of banality, but its groove irresistible. Ferry's singing succumbs to the seductions of the beat and actually shows some life, so that even though the lyrics are actually quite as predictable as they want to be, their juxtaposition with heavily romantic piano chords, synth riffs, and Andy Mackay's soprano sax solo lends them a lush romanticism, as if the love song overlay were genuinely felt by all concerned."

Rob Sheffield wrote: "Ferry had always founded his most arcane art notions on an unshakeable passion for pop. Roxy's quintessential song from this era is 1980's "Over You." Ferry glides through the trance-like groove with the mantra "Wish I was somewhere/Over You." until he starts ascending into the ether, leaving his fickle lover behind, soaring higher through glaze and gloss. Then the song fades out and Ferry starts the act again. This approach can get wearing, especially if you don't believe that tears-in-my-caviar heartbreak is a spiritual quest. But when Bryan's on, as in Manifesto's Dance Away or Flesh + Blood's Oh Yeah, its impossible not to fall for him." AllMusic in a review of the single: "Over You" represents one of the crowning achievements of Roxy Music's last years, a hauntingly hypnotic love song which spirals along on a warm bed of rhythm and guitar, interspersed with a few slabs of classic Roxy dissonance, and interrupted by some classic Beatles-ish guitar from Phil Manzanera." Greil Marcus wrote "I was attracted to "Over You" the first few times it played by; now, when I hear Manzanera echo Ferry's 3 A.M. piano, and then hear Mackay make his way out of the night to echo them both, the pattern repeating again and again, I swoon."

Jonathan Rigby praised the second single from the album, writing "If "Dance Away" achieved Ferry's long-held ambition and became accepted as a modern standard, it's hard to see why the same accolade has yet to be bestowed on "Oh Yeah", which is perhaps the most limpidly beautiful ballad in his portfolio." AllMusic in its review states "The sequence of exquisite singles that Roxy Music rattled off as the late '70s became the early '80s was highlighted by any number of songs which, dispassionately, could be ranked among Bryan Ferry's purest pop visions yet. "Oh Yeah" surely edges them all, however, not only for its own understanding of the genre's traditions (an everyday story of boy meets girl, in car with radio), but also via its reinvention over a decade later, when London Suede (surely the most convincing of all Roxy's stylistic heirs) borrowed both a lyric and the mood for their own The Wild Ones."

David Buckley wrote: "The third single, Same Old Scene, was the best of the three. Roxy's most perfect dance record, its unstoppable groove, funky, Chic-like bass and blasts of Sax made it another sizeable hit ... That single, more than any other from the Roxy oeuvre, appeared to have been internalized by the incipient London club scene at the time. By 1981, the charts would be full of songs with a similarly musical trajectory: rumbling disco bass, clipped, riffy guitar and a smooth vocal over the top." Paul Stump in Unknown Pleasures says the song "was imprinted upon every new popster's eardrum almost immediately, most notably upon Duran Duran who first built a debut single (Planet Earth) and then a career upon this one brief moment of Roxy Music studio harmonization."

== Live performances and tour ==
Just over half of this album has been played live over the course of the band's career, most of the performances coming from the then "Roxy Music Flesh + Blood" tour in 1980–81 supporting the album. The tour had to have some dates cancelled due to Bryan Ferry having a kidney infection. The band performed "Jealous Guy" after John Lennon was murdered. This tribute performance was the inspiration for the band to record the song and release it as a single.

== Track listing ==
All tracks are written by Bryan Ferry except as noted.

Side one
No.	Title	Writer(s)	Length
1.	"In the Midnight Hour (Wilson Pickett Cover)"	Wilson Pickett; Steve Cropper	3:13
2.	"Oh Yeah"		4:50
3.	"Same Old Scene"		3:57
4.	"Flesh and Blood"		3:13
5.	"My Only Love"		5:19

Side two
No.	Title	Writer(s)	Length
6.	"Over You"	Ferry; Phil Manzanera	3:26
7.	"Eight Miles High"	Gene Clark; David Crosby; Roger McGuinn	4:53
8.	"Rain Rain Rain"		3:20
9.	"No Strange Delight"	Ferry; Phil Manzanera	4:44
10.	"Running Wild"	Ferry; Phil Manzanera	5:01
Total length:			41:56

== Personnel ==
Track numbering refers to CD and digital releases of the album.

Roxy Music

- Bryan Ferry – vocals, keyboards (1, 3, 6–9), acoustic piano (2, 5, 10), synthesizers (4), guitars (4), strings (5)
- Andy Mackay – saxophones, oboe (9)
- Phil Manzanera – guitars (1, 3, 6, 9), lead guitar (2, 5, 7, 10), bass (6), rhythm guitar (10)

Additional personnel

- Paul Carrack – strings (2), acoustic piano (10), organ (10)
- Neil Hubbard – guitars (1, 5, 7, 8), rhythm guitar (2, 10)
- Andy Newmark – drums (4, 5)
- Allan Schwartzberg – drums (1, 2, 3, 6–10), percussion (4, 5)
- Simon Phillips – percussion (5)
- Gary Tibbs – bass (1)
- Neil Jason – bass (2, 7, 9)
- Alan Spenner – bass (3, 4, 5, 8, 10)

Production

- Roxy Music – producers
- Rhett Davies – producer, engineer
- Bob Clearmountain – mixing
- Bob Ludwig – mastering at Masterdisk (New York, NY)
- Bryan Ferry, Neil Kirk, Antony Price, Simon Puxley and Peter Saville – cover artwork

== Charts ==
=== Weekly charts ===
Chart (1980–1981)	Peak position
Australian Albums (Kent Music Report)	10
Austrian Albums (Ö3 Austria)	15
Belgian Albums (Billboard Benelux)	4
Canada Top Albums/CDs (RPM)	12
Dutch Albums (Album Top 100)	8
German Albums (Offizielle Top 100)	6
New Zealand Albums (RMNZ)	1
Norwegian Albums (VG-lista)	6
Swedish Albums (Sverigetopplistan)	7
UK Albums (Official Charts)	1
US Billboard 200	35

=== Year-end charts ===
Chart (1980)	Position
German Albums (Offizielle Top 100)	30
New Zealand Albums (RMNZ)	24

Chart (1981)	Position
German Albums (Offizielle Top 100)	35
New Zealand Albums (RMNZ)	7

== Certifications ==
Region	Certification	Certified units/sales
Australia (ARIA)	Gold	20,000^{^}
Belgium (BRMA)	Gold	25,000^{*}
France (SNEP)	Gold	100,000^{*}
Germany (BVMI)	Gold	250,000^{^}
Netherlands (NVPI)	Gold	50,000^{^}
New Zealand (RMNZ)	Platinum	15,000^{^}
United Kingdom (BPI)	Platinum	300,000^{^}
^{*} Sales figures based on certification alone.^{^} Shipments figures based on certification alone.
