= Street Life (Roxy Music song) =

Single by Roxy Music

from the album Stranded
- B-side: "Hula Kula"
- Released: November 1973
- Recorded: September 1973, Air Studios, London
- Genre: Art rock, glam rock
- Length: 3:29
- Label: E.G.
- Songwriter: Bryan Ferry
- Producer: Chris Thomas

Roxy Music singles chronology
"Do The Strand" (1973)	"Street Life" (1973)	"All I Want Is You" (1974)

Video
- "Street Life" live on Musikladen 1974 on YouTube

"Street Life" is the opening track of English rock band Roxy Music's third album Stranded. Written by lead singer Bryan Ferry, the song is an ode to modern life that features sound effects of street noise alongside dissonant synth noises courtesy of newly recruited member Eddie Jobson. Producer Chris Thomas provides bass on the song.

"Street Life" was released as the first single from Stranded, reaching the top ten in the band's native UK. The song has since seen acclaim from music writers for staking out a new direction for the band and has become a live favorite for the band.

== Background ==
"Street Life" was written by Roxy Music vocalist and frontman Bryan Ferry. Ferry said of the song, "I wanted it to be a high-energy, fun song – buzzy and vibrant – and I hope the words convey some of that joie de vivre. Each verse seems to have its own character, like blocks on a street." He also noted that "connoisseurs might notice the number of allusions to various brands of chocolate," such as Milky Way, After Eight, and Black Magic, in spite of the fact that he "never touched the stuff." Saxophonist Andy Mackay stated that the song "has a great lyric, a real swagger" and recalled, "That was Bryan’s great period for writing. He was the best lyric-writer in Britain for quite a few years. ... The phrases were really coming."

"Street Life" opens with what Ferry describes as "a cacophony of traffic noise, played by [Eddie] Jobson on synthesizer and Andy Mackay on sax, mingled with real sounds of the street – car horns, for example – and then the vocal enters." Producer Chris Thomas claimed that the band attempted to dangle a microphone from a window in Air Studios to capture the sounds of traffic below, but this was unsuccessful. The band instead used sound effects from a market in Morocco. Guitarist Phil Manzanera credited Jobson, who had been recruited for the album to replace the recently departed Brian Eno, for the "dissonant [notes] at the beginning", saying, "That's the sort of thing Eddie would get up to. He was very young and you couldn't control him."

The bass on the song was played by producer Thomas, after regular Roxy bassist John Gustafson was unable to come up with a satisfactory bassline. Manzanera remembered, "We came in one day and Chris Thomas had put the bass on himself, out of sheer frustration. It totally transformed the track. His bass part is fantastic."

== Release ==
Stranded was the band's first album with Eddie Jobson, who replaced Brian Eno. It was released as a single in the UK in November 1973 and reached number 9 on the charts. Its non-LP B-side "Hula Kula", a Hawaiian-like instrumental composed by Phil Manzanera, was re-released on "The Thrill of It All" boxset.

The song has since become a fan favorite and has appeared regularly on the band's live setlists. Ferry stated, "'Street Life' became a bit of an anthem for Roxy fans at shows, and seemed to be a cue for them to rush the aisles, showing off their tuxedos and suchlike." The band also performed the song live on Dick Clark's In Concert television show; of the appearance, touring Roxy bassist Sal Maida recollected, "It was an absolute blast to meet Dick Clark, TV royalty, an institution."

== Critical reception ==
AllMusic's Dave Thompson glowingly praised the song, writing, "A little less frantic than some of the band's better early material, with one of their most conventional arrangements, it is the sound of Roxy shedding the brittle skin of their earlier art-attack persona, and acknowledging that they're a great pop group as well. Before 'Street Life,' not many people really appreciated that fact."

The Guardian ranked the song on their list of the ten best Roxy Music songs, calling it "a swashbuckling paean to walking the mean streets to avoid nuisance phone calls." Ultimate Classic Rock rated it the band's eighth best song, writing, "Everyone, including the rhythm section of John Gustafson and drummer Paul Thompson, is in fine, strutting form here, but it’s the swirling synthesizer of Eddie Jobson (who replaced Brian Eno beginning with Stranded) that makes you feel like you’re losing your mind."

== Charts ==
Chart (1975–1976)	Peak position
UK Singles (OCC)	9
West Germany (GfK)	40

== Covers ==
Bassist John Taylor, also known as Johnny, during his solo period after leaving Duran Duran in 1997, organized a Roxy Music tribute album called Dream Home Heartaches: Remaking/Remodeling Roxy Music (released 1999). "Street Life" was covered by Gerry Laffy and Simon Laffy, credited as Phantom 5.

The band Def Leppard covered "Street Life" on their album Yeah!

Morrissey also performed the song during some European festival dates during his 2006 tour, before dropping it from his setlist after it attracted the "blankest of blank reactions from the audience". He had previously requested the song during a KROQ broadcast in 1997, commenting, "Excellent unique sound, a very, very unique group in their early years."

== Personnel ==
- Bryan Ferry – vocals, piano
- Andy Mackay – oboe, saxophone, treatments
- Chris Thomas – bass
- Paul Thompson – drums, timpani
- Phil Manzanera – guitar, treatments
- Eddie Jobson – violin, synthesizer, keyboards
