= Avalon (Roxy Music album) =

Studio album by Roxy Music
- Released: 28 May 1982
- Recorded: 1981–1982
- Studios: Gallery (Chertsey, UK); Power Station (New York City); Compass Point (Nassau, Bahamas)
- Genres: Sophisti-pop; pop-soul; new wave
- Length: 37:26
- Labels: E.G.; Polydor
- Producers: Rhett Davies; Roxy Music

Roxy Music chronology
Flesh + Blood (1980)	Avalon (1982)	The High Road (1983)

Singles from Avalon
- 1. "More than This" Released: March 1982; 2. "Avalon" Released: June 1982; 3. "Take a Chance with Me" Released: September 1982

Avalon is the eighth and final studio album by the English rock band Roxy Music, released on 28 May 1982 by E.G. Records and Polydor. It was recorded between 1981 and 1982 at Compass Point Studios in Nassau, Bahamas, and is regarded as the culmination of the smoother, more adult-oriented sound of the band's later work. It has been credited with pioneering the sophisti-pop genre.

The first single, "More Than This", preceded the album and was a top 10 hit in Britain, Australia, and several European countries. "Avalon", the second single, reached the top 20; "Take a Chance with Me" reached the top 30. In the United States, "More Than This" and "Take a Chance with Me" reached 103 and 104.

Avalon is Roxy Music's most successful studio album. It stayed at number one on the UK Albums Chart for three weeks, and stayed on the chart for over a year. Although it reached only No. 53 in the US, Avalon endured as a sleeper hit and became Roxy Music's lone million-selling US record, ultimately receiving platinum certification. While the band has toured periodically since the album's release, it remains their most recent studio album to date.

== Background and production ==
Roxy Music lead singer Bryan Ferry started writing material for Avalon while staying at Crumlin Lodge on the west coast of Ireland. Ferry was there with his girlfriend, Lucy Helmore, who would become his wife in 1983. The album cover artwork featured the same lough (lake) that can be seen from the lodge. Ferry said of the album:

I've often thought I should do an album where the songs are all bound together in the style of West Side Story, but it's always seemed like too much bother to work that way. So instead, I have these 10 poems, or short stories, that could, with a bit more work, be fashioned into a novel. Avalon is part of the King Arthur legend and is a very romantic thing, when King Arthur dies, the Queens ferry him off to Avalon, which is sort of an enchanted island. It's the ultimate romantic fantasy place.

Guitarist Phil Manzanera has said about the making of the record: "By the time you get to Avalon, 90 per cent of it was being written in the studio. That album was a product of completely changing our working methods," adding "for the last three albums, quite frankly, there were a lot more drugs around as well, which was good and bad. It created a lot of paranoia and a lot of spaced-out stuff." Production began at Manzanera's Gallery Studios in Chertsey, where they worked on song ideas in the studio and developed backing tracks to a Linn LM-1 drum machine. After a month of refining the tracks at Compass Point Studios, the sessions relocated to the Power Station in New York City for final overdubs (including drums) and mixing with Bob Clearmountain. "To Turn You On" was previously released as a B-side to "Jealous Guy" in 1981, and was an outtake from Manifesto as per Davies - only a new mix was made for Avalon.

Manzanera said of the title track, "Avalon", "When we were recording the third or fourth album in London we'd often be working in the same studio as Bob Marley, who'd be downstairs doing all of those famous albums. It just had to rub off somewhere." Rhett Davies recounted the story of how the song got made:

[While on a coffee break in the studio], Bryan and I could hear this girl from the Haitian band next door singing, and we thought, "Wow! What a voice! We've got to get her singing some backing vocals on 'Avalon.'" That was Yanick Étienne, who didn't speak a word of English. She came in with her boyfriend/manager and we described to him what we wanted and she sort of sang the choruses and the [word] "Avalon" – the great sound that is on there. Then we said, "Can she try and do something free at the end?" and we ran the end of the track and she did absolutely nothing. So I said, "No, we want her to sing anything that she would want to sing, totally free." So the second time we ran the tape, she sang exactly what you hear on the record at the end.

Bryan then went straight out and re-sang his vocal properly, because he was so inspired by Yanick's singing. I remember Bryan's manager walked in the room and Bryan was just finishing his vocal. We were doing the playback and I'd never seen the look on his eyes before. He went, "Jesus fucking Christ! That is incredible!" Well, we knew it was a really high point of the evening. I remember going, "Wow! We have really created something special here." That is how I felt. Then we mixed it the next day with Bob [Clearmountain].

It was one of those turnaround things, where the original track was just about to be thrown in the can. And then suddenly, we did a completely different version of the song that just made the record for me ... I thought, "That's it. That completes the record!" I remember we had dinner a couple nights later, and I asked Bryan, "What are you going to call the album?" and he said, "I'm going to call it Avalon," and I thought, "Yeah. Of course."

== Artwork ==
The artwork was designed by Bryan Ferry and Antony Price, who oversaw the photography shoot in Ireland with photographer Neil Kirk. The typeface and rear of the vinyl sleeve were laid out by Peter Saville. Avalon continued the tradition for Roxy Music albums to feature images of women on the cover artwork. Bryan Ferry's girlfriend (and soon to be wife) Lucy Helmore appeared on the album cover.

The scene was captured by photographer Neil Kirk at dawn, looking out over Lough Ugga Beag, Connemara. A robed figure wearing a medieval helmet is pictured from behind facing a body of water. A hooded Merlin Falcon is perched on their gloved hand, evoking King Arthur's last journey to the mysterious land of Avalon. Neil Kirk had been introuduced to Ferry by Antony Price, having already worked with the fashion designer. By 1982, Kirk had already shot the album covers to Roxy Music Albums Manifesto and Flesh + Blood

In November 1982, Roxy Music singer Bryan Ferry told the LA Weekly's Don Waller: "(Avalon) is the Isle of Enchantment, a fantasy place, a very romantic place... I thought this was the most romantic, dream-like album I'd ever done. I started working on the songs for Avalon on the west coast of Ireland, on the very lake that's used in the photograph on the album cover".

== Critical reception ==
Professional ratings
Review scores
Source	Rating
AllMusic	5/5 stars
Mojo	4/5 stars
Pitchfork	8.0/10
Q	4/5 stars
Rolling Stone	4/5 stars
The Rolling Stone Album Guide	4.5/5 stars
Smash Hits	8/10
Spin Alternative Record Guide	9/10
Uncut	4/5 stars
The Village Voice	A−

The album has received positive reviews from music critics. Reviewing the album in Rolling Stone, Kurt Loder wrote: "Avalon takes a long time to kick in, but it finally does, and it's a good one. Bryan Ferry stars as a remarkably expressive keyboard player and singer whose familiar mannerisms are subsumed in a rich, benevolent self-assurance. And reed man Andy Mackay shines in a series of cameos (his oboe meditation on Ferry's 'Tara' is particularly lovely). Ten years after its debut, Roxy Music has mellowed: the occasional stark piano chords in 'While My Heart Is Still Beating,' for example, recall the stately mood of 'A Song for Europe,' but the sound is softer, dreamier and less determinedly dramatic now. Ferry's songwriting, however, has seldom seemed stronger." Billboard felt that it was their "one of their strongest collections of songs to date".

In The Village Voice's 1982 Pazz & Jop critics' poll, Avalon was voted the 11th-best album of the year. In 1989, the album was ranked No. 31 on Rolling Stone magazine's list of "The 100 Greatest Albums of the 1980s". In 1993, Entertainment Weekly included the CD as No. 25 in their 100 Greatest CDs A Love-It-Or-Loathe-It Guide to the Essential Disc Library. In 2000 it was voted number 187 in Colin Larkin's All Time Top 1000 Albums. In 2003, the album was ranked number 307 on Rolling Stone magazine's list of The 500 Greatest Albums of All Time. Avalon is the highest entry of four Roxy Music albums that made the list (Siren at No. 371, Country Life at No. 387 and For Your Pleasure at No. 394 being the others); Avalon and Country Life were dropped from the 2012 revision, but Avalon was re-included on the 2020 revision at No. 336. In 2012, Slant Magazine named the album the 45th best album of the 1980s.

Mark Coleman in The New Rolling Stone Album Guide gave the record four-and-a-half stars out of five, and wrote; "this austere, beautiful set of songs represents a mature peak. The controlled chaotic edge of the early albums is completely gone, and co-founders Manzanera and Mackay provide only skeletal guitar and sax lines. Ferry fills in the details, creating layered synth landscapes around his tragic scenarios and melodic ruminations. Avalon's pervasive influence on the British pop scene of the '80s can't be overstated. Roxy Music's stature is even further enhanced by the absence of a latter-day comeback album. So far, anyway." Spin Alternative Record Guide rated Avalon nine out of ten: "1982's Avalon remains one of the all-time great makeout infernos, a synthesized version of Al Green's Call Me, Van Morrison's Moondance, and João Gilberto's Amoroso."

== 2003 and 2024 surround-sound remixes ==
In 2003, Virgin reissued Avalon on Hybrid Super Audio CD with a new 5.1-channel surround sound remix by the original production team of Rhett Davies (the producer) and Bob Clearmountain (the mixing engineer). The original 1982 stereo mix is left intact and is the same for the CD layer and for the HD layer, allegedly being transferred from analogue master tapes to DSD and processed in DSD throughout the process. The surround part of the HD layer includes the full album in the original running order plus the bonus track "Always Unknowing", whose original stereo mix is only available on CD on the 4-CD boxed set The Thrill of It All and in the 2012 Roxy Music Complete Recordings boxed set.

Except for "India", the short instrumental piece whose original multi-track tape had been lost, all tracks in the surround mix were remixed from multi-track sources, as opposed to two-channel stereo mixes being 'upmixed' to 5.1 as in some DVD-Video releases. For "India," the stereo mix is panned clockwise a few times as the track plays, which ends in the rear right channel, from which the saxophone begins the next piece, "While My Heart Is Still Beating," making up for "India" not being a fully-fledged surround recording.

The surround mix has roughly the same running times as the ten tracks present in the stereo mix. The main difference is in the stereo image being 360-degrees wide, as opposed to a front image plus rear ambiance, and the levels at which various tracks from the multi-track are mixed into the multi-channel mix. For instance, the guitar parts in "The Main Thing" and "Take a Chance with Me" are noticeably more prominent in the multi-channel mix than in the stereo mix. Guitar, saxophone, synthesizer, and percussion parts are often placed in the rear part of the sound field, while lead vocals tend to stick to the front centre, as opposed to being mixed in dual-mono in front left and right like in the somewhat traditional 2.0 stereo mixing.

In an interview with Sound on Sound regarding the surround-sound remix of Avalon, Clearmountain stated: "This record probably means more to me than anything I've ever done. I've had more comments and compliments on this album by far than anything else I've ever done."

In 2024, the album received another surround treatment when Bob Clearmountain remixed Avalon in Dolby Atmos immersive sound. In the accompanying press release, Bryan Ferry said, "Bob is the great master of the art of mixing, I was very moved when I heard his recent Dolby Atmos mix of Avalon – it sounds amazing." This digital-only product was only available on Apple Music and Tidal. In November 2024, this version was nominated for a Grammy Award for Best Immersive Audio Album, a nod the 2003 release had also received (without winning).

A physical release of the Dolby Atmos mix on a limited Blu-Ray Audio disc (which also includes the original 5.1 mix, though without the bonus track "Always Unknowing", according to the band's wishes) was announced in February 2025, available to anyone who preorders until February 21. On this occasion, it was also explained that the multitracks of "India" had been found and used for the Atmos mix.

== Track listing ==
All tracks are written by Bryan Ferry, except where noted.

Side one
No.	Title	Writer(s)	Length
1.	"More Than This"		4:30
2.	"The Space Between"		4:30
3.	"Avalon"		4:16
4.	"India" (instrumental)		1:44
5.	"While My Heart Is Still Beating"	Ferry; Andy Mackay	3:26

Side two
No.	Title	Writer(s)	Length
1.	"The Main Thing"		3:54
2.	"Take a Chance with Me"	Ferry; Phil Manzanera	4:42
3.	"To Turn You On"		4:16
4.	"True to Life"		4:25
5.	"Tara" (instrumental)	Ferry; Mackay	1:43
Total length:			37:26

== Personnel ==
Track numbering refers to CD and digital releases of the album, except where noted.

Roxy Music

- Bryan Ferry – vocals (1–3, 5–9), keyboards, guitar synthesizer (4), Linn LM-1
- Andy Mackay – saxophones (1–6, 9, 10), oboe (7)
- Phil Manzanera – lead guitar (1–7, 9)

Additional personnel

- Yanick Étienne – backing vocals on "Avalon" (3)
- Neil Hubbard – guitars (1–9)
- Jimmy Maelen – percussion (1–3, 5, 7, 9)
- Andy Newmark – drums (1–7, 9)
- Alan Spenner – bass guitar (1, 3–6, 8, 10)
- Neil Jason – bass guitar (2, 6, 7, 9)
- Fonzi Thornton – backing vocals (1–3, 5–7, 9)
- Rick Marotta – drums (8)
- Paul Carrack – piano (8)
- Kermit Moore – cello (8)

Production

- Rhett Davies – producer, engineer
- Roxy Music – producers
- Benjamin Arbiter – assistant producer
- Barry Bongiovi – assistant producer
- Colin Good – assistant producer
- Ian Little – assistant producer
- Peter Revill – assistant producer
- Bob Clearmountain – engineer, mixing
- Michael Boddy – tape archivist
- Bob Ludwig – mastering at Masterdisk (New York City)
- Bryan Ferry, Neil Kirk, Antony Price, and Peter Saville – cover artwork

== Charts ==
=== Weekly charts ===
Chart (1982–1983)	Peak position
Australian Albums (Kent Music Report)	1
Austrian Albums (Ö3 Austria)	5
Canada Top Albums/CDs (RPM)	1
Dutch Albums (Album Top 100)	1
Finnish Albums (The Official Finnish Charts)	26
German Albums (Offizielle Top 100)	4
Italian Albums (Musica e dischi)	14
New Zealand Albums (RMNZ)	1
Norwegian Albums (VG-lista)	1
Spanish Albums (AFYVE)	7
Swedish Albums (Sverigetopplistan)	1
UK Albums (Official Charts)	1
US Billboard 200	53

Chart (2022)	Peak position
Scottish Albums (Official Charts)	81

=== Year-end charts ===
Chart (1982)	Position
Australian Albums (Kent Music Report)	5
Canada Top Albums/CDs (RPM)	4
Dutch Albums (Album Top 100)	5
German Albums (Offizielle Top 100)	23
New Zealand Albums (RMNZ)	4
UK Albums (OCC)	9

== Certifications ==
Region	Certification	Certified units/sales
Australia (ARIA)	2× Platinum	100,000^{^}
Canada (Music Canada)	Platinum	100,000^{^}
France (SNEP)	Gold	100,000^{*}
Germany (BVMI)	Gold	250,000^{^}
Netherlands (NVPI)	Platinum	100,000^{^}
New Zealand (RMNZ)	Platinum	15,000^{^}
Spain (Promusicae)	Gold	50,000^{^}
United Kingdom (BPI)	Platinum	300,000^{^}
United States (RIAA)	Platinum	1,000,000^{^}
^{*} Sales figures based on certification alone.^{^} Shipments figures based on certification alone.
