= Gary Tibbs =

British musician (born 1958)

- Born: 25 January 1958 (age 68)
- Origin: Northwood, Middlesex, England
- Genres: New wave; post-punk
- Occupation: Musician
- Instrument: Bass

Gary Brian Tibbs (born 25 January 1958) is an English bass guitarist and actor. He is best known as a member of Adam and the Ants and for his work with Roxy Music. He appeared alongside Hazel O'Connor in the film Breaking Glass (1980) as bass guitarist Dave.

== Life and career ==
Tibbs was born in Northwood, London, England on 25 January 1958. He was a member of Adam and the Ants, and is mentioned by name in the lyrics of the band's UK top ten hit "Ant Rap". At various times he was a member of Zu Zu Sharks, Code Blue, The Believers, The Vibrators and The Fixx. He first played on The Fixx's 2003 album, Want That Life. Tibbs also worked with Roxy Music extensively from 1978 to 1981, toured with Little Steven & The Disciples of Soul in 1984 and played on selected tracks on Brian May's 1993 solo album Back to the Light.

He also formed a band called Merrick and Tibbs with Chris Hughes (a.k.a. Merrick), just after leaving Adam & the Ants. They released a single in 1982 entitled "Call of the Wild". In the early 1990s, Tibbs formed The Believers with drummer Manny Elias and guitarist Andy Skelton; they released one album in 1992, entitled "Extraordinary Life". The album was produced by Greg Ladanyi, and featured C. J. Vanston on keyboards and organ.

In February 2008, Tibbs left The Fixx upon the return of the band's previous bassist, Dan K. Brown.

Preceded by Kevin Mooney	Adam and the Ants bassist 1981–1982	Succeeded by Chris Constantinou
