= Angel Eyes (Roxy Music song) =

Single by Roxy Music

from the album Manifesto
- B-side: "My Little Girl"
- Released: 3 August 1979
- Recorded: 1978/79
- Genre: Pop rock; dance; disco
- Length: 3:32 (Album version); 3:06 (7" single); 6:37 (12" extended remix)
- Label: Polydor; E.G.; Atco
- Songwriters: Bryan Ferry; Andy Mackay
- Producer: Roxy Music

Roxy Music singles chronology
"Dance Away" (1979)	"Angel Eyes" (1979)	"Over You" (1980)

Music video
- "Angel Eyes" on YouTube

"Angel Eyes" is a song by the English rock band Roxy Music. It was released on 3 August 1979 as the third single from their sixth studio album Manifesto (1979), and peaked at No. 4 on the UK singles chart.

The single was a disco re-recorded version of the album track, which was more in a rock vein, and (just like the previous single "Dance Away") was also released as an extended 12" dance mix (still a relatively new format at that time). The single version of "Angel Eyes" later replaced the album version for subsequent releases. The album version was first re-released on The Thrill of It All (1995) box set. The 1999 re-mastered version of the Manifesto album finally restored the original version of the song. The single re-recording of the song omits the last verse.

Coincidentally, the song was in the UK top 20 at the same time as another song called "Angeleyes" by the Swedish pop group ABBA.

"Angel Eyes" was also the first record for which Roxy Music made a specific music video. It was directed by Bill Stewart, who also directed the controversial Protect and Survive Public Information Film series.

Since 2017, "Angel Eyes" serves as the intro music to La Grande Librairie, a weekly magazine programme centered on literature, broadcast on French television channel France 5.

== Track listing ==
- 12" single (POSPX 67)
1. "Angel Eyes" – 6:39
2. "My Little Girl" – 3:08
- 7" single (POSP 67)
1. "Angel Eyes" – 3:08
2. "My Little Girl" – 3:08

== Personnel ==
Roxy Music

- Bryan Ferry – lead vocals, keyboards
- Andy Mackay – oboe, saxophone
- Phil Manzanera – electric guitar
- Paul Thompson – drums

Additional musicians

- Gary Tibbs – bass guitar
- Paul Carrack – keyboards
- Fiona Hibbert – harp

== Charts ==
=== Weekly charts ===
Chart (1979)	Peak position
Belgium (Ultratop 50 Flanders)	4
Netherlands (Dutch Top 40)	10
Netherlands (Single Top 100)	13
New Zealand (Recorded Music NZ)	50
UK Singles (Official Charts)	4

=== Year-end charts ===
Chart (1979)	Position
Belgium (Ultratop Flanders)	67
Netherlands (Dutch Top 40)	93

== Certifications ==
Region	Certification	Certified units/sales
United Kingdom (BPI)	Silver	250,000^{^}
^{^} Shipments figures based on certification alone.
