= Oh Yeah (Roxy Music song) =

Single by Roxy Music

from the album Flesh and Blood
- B-side: "South Downs"; "Rain Rain Rain" (US); "In the Midnight Hour" (Australia)
- Released: 25 July 1980
- Recorded: 1980
- Genre: Pop
- Length: 4:12 (single version); 4:51 (album version)
- Label: Atco; Reprise; E.G.
- Songwriter: Bryan Ferry
- Producers: Rhett Davies; Roxy Music

Roxy Music singles chronology
"Over You" (1980)	"Oh Yeah" (1980)	"Same Old Scene" (1980)

Official audio
- "Oh Yeah" on YouTube

"Oh Yeah", also known as "Oh Yeah (There's a Band Playing On the Radio)" or "Oh Yeah (On the Radio)" on certain releases, is a hit single by the English rock band Roxy Music. It was released as the second single from their seventh studio album Flesh and Blood (1980). The song is featured prominently in the fifth episode of the Stephen Merchant sitcom Hello Ladies.

== Background ==
The song was recorded during the sessions for the album Flesh and Blood, their first studio album since the departure of drummer Paul Thompson from the band. This turned Roxy Music into a trio consisting of Bryan Ferry, Andy Mackay and Phil Manzanera. Two session musicians filled in for Thompson, with Allan Schwartzberg playing drums on the majority of the album, and Andy Newmark playing on two tracks.

"Oh Yeah" was backed by the non-LP track "South Downs", a synthesiser instrumental by Ferry, or by the album tracks "Rain Rain Rain" (in the US) and "In the Midnight Hour" (in Australia and South Africa).

"South Downs" when re-released on the four-CD compilation box set The Thrill of It All (1995) was accidentally released backwards, but due to the nature of the synthetic string sound, it didn't sound out of place. The original version reappeared on a 3-track CD single with "Jealous Guy" and "Lover".

== Chart performance ==
"Oh Yeah" debuted on the UK singles chart at No. 30 and reached a peak of No. 5 on August 16. This was the second top 10 from the album with the previous single, "Over You", also reaching a peak of No. 5, and their fourth consecutive UK top 10. "Oh Yeah" spent a total of 8 weeks on the UK singles chart, three of which were within the top 10.

Although released as a single in US, "Oh Yeah" did not chart on the Billboard Hot 100.

== Personnel ==
Roxy Music

- Bryan Ferry – vocals, keyboards
- Phil Manzanera – guitar
- Andy Mackay – saxophones; oboe

Additional personnel

- Neil Hubbard – guitar
- Paul Carrack – strings
- Neil Jason – bass
- Allan Schwartzberg – drums

== Charts ==
Chart (1980)	Peak position
West Germany (GfK)	14
Netherlands (Single Top 100)	39
UK Singles (Official Charts)	5

== Certifications ==
Region	Certification	Certified units/sales
New Zealand (RMNZ)	Gold	15,000^{‡}
^{‡} Sales+streaming figures based on certification alone.
