= Avalon (Roxy Music song) =

1982 single by Roxy Music

Single by Roxy Music

from the album Avalon
- B-side: "Always Unknowing"
- Released: June 1982
- Recorded: 1981–1982
- Genre: Lounge-rock; synth-pop
- Length: 4:16
- Label: Warner Bros.; Reprise; E.G.
- Songwriter: Bryan Ferry
- Producers: Rhett Davies; Roxy Music

Roxy Music singles chronology
"More than This" (1982)	"Avalon" (1982)	"Take a Chance with Me" (1982)

"Avalon" is a 1982 song by the English rock band Roxy Music. It was released as the second single from their eighth and final studio album Avalon (1982). The single, with its B-side, "Always Unknowing", charted at No. 13 in the UK.

== Recording ==
The song's distinctive backing vocals were performed by Haitian singer Yanick Étienne, whom Bryan Ferry encountered during the recording of the album. He heard her in the adjacent studio and invited her to contribute backing vocals to the recording.

== Promotional video ==
The song's music video was directed by Ridley Scott and features the English actress Sophie Ward, daughter of actor Simon Ward. It was filmed in Mentmore Towers country house.

== Personnel ==
- Bryan Ferry – lead vocals, keyboards
- Andy Mackay – saxophone
- Phil Manzanera – guitar
- Neil Hubbard – guitar
- Alan Spenner – bass guitar
- Andy Newmark – drums
- Jimmy Maelen – percussion
- Fonzi Thornton – backing vocals
- Yanick Étienne – backing vocals

== Charts ==
=== Weekly charts ===
Chart (1982)	Peak position
Australia (Kent Music Report)	22
Belgium (Ultratop 50 Flanders)	5
Ireland (Singles Chart)	9
Netherlands (Dutch Top 40)	3
Netherlands (Single Top 100)	8
New Zealand (Recorded Music NZ)	37
Spain (AFYVE)	17
Sweden (Sverigetopplistan)	19
UK Singles (Official Charts)	13
US Mainstream Rock (Billboard)	59
West Germany (GfK)	45

Chart (2012)	Peak position
France (SNEP)	105

=== Year-end charts ===
Chart (1982)	Position
Belgium (Ultratop Flanders)	54
Netherlands (Dutch Top 40)	36
Netherlands (Single Top 100)	72

== Certifications ==
Region	Certification	Certified units/sales
United Kingdom (BPI)	Gold	400,000^{‡}
^{‡} Sales+streaming figures based on certification alone.
