= Roxy Music =

English art rock band

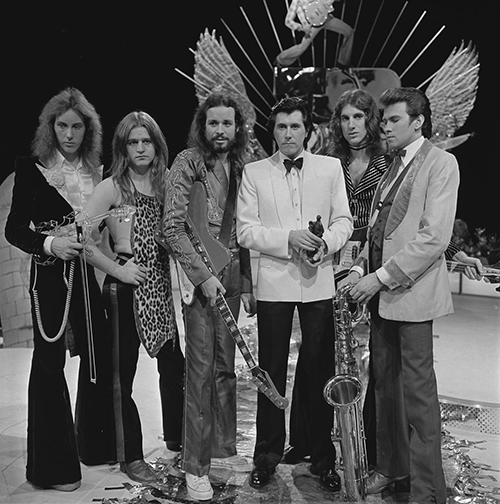
- Roxy Music on TopPop, 1974. Left to right: Eddie Jobson, Paul Thompson, Phil Manzanera, Bryan Ferry, Sal Maida, Andy Mackay

Background information
- Origin: Newcastle upon Tyne/London, England
- Genres: Art rock; glam rock; pop rock; sophisti-pop
- Works: Roxy Music discography
- Years active: 1970–1976; 1978–1983; 2001–2011; 2019; 2022
- Labels: Island; E.G.; Virgin; Atco; Reprise; Warner Bros.
- Spinoffs: The Explorers; 801
- Past members: Bryan Ferry; Andy Mackay; Phil Manzanera; Paul Thompson; Brian Eno; Graham Simpson; Rik Kenton; Eddie Jobson
- Website: roxymusic.co.uk

Roxy Music were an English rock band formed in 1970 by Bryan Ferry (lead vocals/keyboards/principal songwriter) and Graham Simpson (bass). By the time the band recorded their first album in early 1972, Ferry and Simpson were joined by Andy Mackay (saxophone/oboe), Phil Manzanera (guitar), Paul Thompson (drums) and Brian Eno (synthesizer). Simpson departed in mid-1972 – from which time the bassist position in the band went on to be unstable – while Eno was replaced by Eddie Jobson (synthesizer/keyboards/violin) in mid-1973. By 1980, the band was reduced to a core trio of Ferry, Mackay and Manzanera, augmented by various backing musicians.

Beginning with their first album, Roxy Music became a successful act in Europe and Australia during the 1970s. The band pioneered more musically sophisticated elements of glam rock, significantly influencing early English punk music, and provided a model for many new wave acts while innovating elements of electronic composition. The group also conveyed their distinctive brand of visual and musical sophistication with their focus on glamorous fashions.

Roxy Music split in 1976, reformed in 1978, and split again in 1983. Their final studio album was Avalon (1982), which was certified Platinum in the United States, where the band had spent their first ten years as a moderately successful cult band. In 2001, Ferry, Mackay, Manzanera and Thompson reunited for a concert tour and have toured together intermittently ever since, most recently in 2022 to celebrate the 50th anniversary of their first album.

Outside the band, Ferry and Eno have had influential solo careers. Ferry has frequently enlisted Roxy Music members as backing musicians during his solo career, and Eno became one of the most significant British record producers of the late 20th century. In 2019, Roxy Music were inducted into the Rock and Roll Hall of Fame.

== History ==
=== Formation and early years (1970–1971) ===
In November 1970, Bryan Ferry, who had just lost his job teaching ceramics at a girls' school for holding impromptu record-listening sessions, advertised for a keyboardist to collaborate with him and Graham Simpson, a bassist he knew from the Gas Board (a band he had formed whilst studying at Newcastle University) and with whom he collaborated on his first songs. Andy Mackay replied to Ferry's advertisement. Although primarily proficient on saxophone and oboe, Mackay also owned an EMS VCS 3 synthesizer.

Mackay had met Brian Eno during university days, as both were interested in avant-garde and electronic music. Although Eno was a non-musician, he could operate a synthesizer and owned a Revox reel-to-reel tape machine, so Mackay convinced him to join the band as a technical adviser. Before long Eno was an official member of the group. Rounding out the original sextet were guitarist Roger Bunn (who had issued the well-regarded solo studio album Piece of Mind earlier in 1970) and drummer Dexter Lloyd, a classically trained timpanist.

The group's name was derived from Ferry and Mackay making a list of old cinemas, and Ferry picking Roxy because it had a "resonance", some "faded glamour", and "didn't really mean anything". After learning of an American band with the name Roxy, Ferry changed the name to Roxy Music, a play on "rock music".

At some time during late 1970/early 1971, Ferry auditioned as lead vocalist for King Crimson, who were seeking a replacement for Gordon Haskell. While Robert Fripp and Peter Sinfield decided Ferry's voice was unsuitable for King Crimson's material, they were impressed with his talent and helped the fledgling Roxy Music to obtain a recording contract with E.G. Records.

In 1971, Roxy Music recorded a demo tape of some early compositions. In the spring of that year, Lloyd left the band, and an advertisement was placed in Melody Maker saying "wonder drummer wanted for an avant rock group". Paul Thompson responded to the advertisement and joined the band in June 1971.

Bunn left the group at the end of the summer of 1971, and in October, Roxy Music advertised in Melody Maker seeking the "Perfect Guitarist". The successful applicant was David O'List, former guitarist with the Nice. Phil Manzanera—soon to become a group member—was one of about twenty other players who also auditioned. Although he did not initially make the band as a guitarist, the group were impressed enough with Manzanera that he was invited to become Roxy Music's roadie, an offer which he accepted. In December 1971, after a year of writing and rehearsing, Roxy Music began playing live, with their first show at the Friends of the Tate Gallery Christmas show in London.

The band's fortunes were greatly increased by the support of broadcaster John Peel and Melody Maker journalist Richard Williams. Williams became an enthusiastic fan after meeting Ferry and being given a demonstration tape during mid-1971, and wrote the first major article on the band, featured on Melody Maker's "Horizons" page in the edition of 7 August 1971. This line-up of Roxy Music (Ferry/Mackay/Eno/Simpson/Thompson/O'List) recorded a BBC session shortly thereafter.

=== First two studio albums (1972–1973) ===
In early February 1972, guitarist O'List quit the group abruptly after an altercation with Paul Thompson, which took place at their audition for David Enthoven of E.G. Management. When O'List did not show up for the next rehearsal, Manzanera was asked to come along, on the pretext of becoming the band's sound mixer. When he arrived he was invited to play guitar and quickly realised that it was an informal audition. Unbeknownst to the rest of the group, Manzanera had learned their entire repertoire and as a result, he was immediately hired as O'List's permanent replacement, joining on 14 February 1972. Manzanera, the son of an English father and a Colombian mother, had spent a considerable amount of time in South America and Cuba as a child, and although he did not have the same art school background as Ferry, Mackay and Eno, he was perhaps the most proficient member of the band, with an interest in a wide variety of music. Manzanera also knew other well-known musicians, such as Pink Floyd's David Gilmour, who was a friend of his elder brother, and Soft Machine's Robert Wyatt. Two weeks after Manzanera joined the band, Roxy Music signed with E.G. Management.

E.G. Management financed the recording of the tracks for their debut album, Roxy Music, recorded in March–April 1972 and produced by King Crimson lyricist Peter Sinfield. Both the album and its famous cover artwork by photographer Karl Stoecker were apparently completed before the group signed with Island Records. A&R staffer Tim Clark later stated that although he argued strongly that Island should contract them, company boss Chris Blackwell at first seemed unimpressed and Clark assumed he was not interested. A few days later, however, Clark and Enthoven were standing in the hallway of the Island offices examining cover images for the album when Blackwell walked past, glanced at the artwork and said "Looks great! Have we got them signed yet?" The band signed with Island Records a few days later. The album was released in June to good reviews and became a major success, reaching No. 10 on the UK Albums Chart in September 1972. Manzanera said in an interview in 2024 that the band received five percent of the profits, to be divided between six musicians.

During the first half of 1972, bassist Graham Simpson became increasingly withdrawn and uncommunicative, which led to his leaving the band almost immediately after the recording of the debut album. From this point on, the bassist position in Roxy Music would be unstable, with Rik Kenton, John Porter, John Gustafson, Sal Maida, John Wetton and Rick Wills all passing in and out of the band over the next four years.

To bring more attention to their studio album, Roxy Music decided to record and release a single. Their debut single was "Virginia Plain", which scored No. 4 on the UK singles chart. The band's eclectic visual image, captured in their debut performance on the BBC's Top of the Pops, became a cornerstone for the glam trend in the UK. The success of the single caused a renewed interest in the album.

Roxy Music's second album, For Your Pleasure, was released in March 1973. It marked the beginning of the band's long, successful collaboration with producer Chris Thomas, who worked on all of the group's classic albums and singles in the 1970s. The album was promoted with the non-album single "Pyjamarama". At the time Ferry was dating French model Amanda Lear; she was photographed with a black jaguar for the front cover of the album, while Ferry appears on the back cover as a dapper chauffeur standing behind a limousine.

=== Stranded, Country Life, Siren, and solo projects (1973–1977) ===
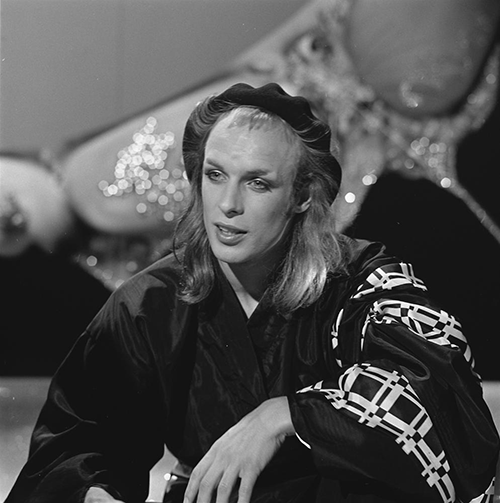
Brian Eno in 1974, shortly after leaving Roxy Music

Soon after the tour to promote For Your Pleasure ended, Brian Eno left Roxy Music amidst increasing differences with Ferry. He was replaced by 18-year-old multi-instrumentalist Eddie Jobson, formerly of progressive rockers Curved Air, who played keyboards and electric violin. Although some fans lamented the loss of the experimental attitude and camp aesthetic that Eno had brought to the band, the classically trained Jobson was a more accomplished musician.

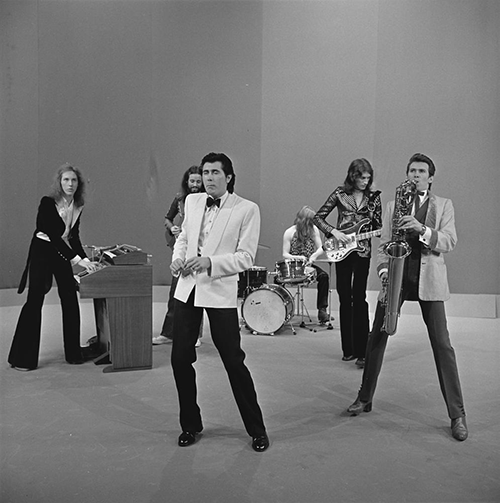
Roxy Music perform on TopPop in 1974. Left to right: Jobson, Manzanera (back), Ferry (front), Thompson, Maida, Mackay

Rolling Stone referred to the band's next two albums, Stranded (1973) and Country Life (1974), as marking "the zenith of contemporary British art rock". The songs on these albums also cemented Ferry's persona as the epitome of the suave, jaded Euro-sophisticate. Although this persona undoubtedly began as a deliberately ironic device, during the mid-1970s it seemed to merge with Ferry's real life, as the working-class miner's son from the north of England became an international rock star and an icon of male style.

On the first two Roxy Music albums, all songs were written solely by Bryan Ferry. Beginning with Stranded, Mackay and Manzanera began to co-write some material. Gradually, their songwriting and musicianship became more integrated into the band's sound, although Ferry remained the dominant songwriter; throughout their career, all but one of Roxy Music's singles were written either wholly or jointly by Ferry (Manzanera, Mackay and Thompson did individually write a few of the band's B-sides). Stranded was released in November 1973, and produced the Top 10 single "Street Life".

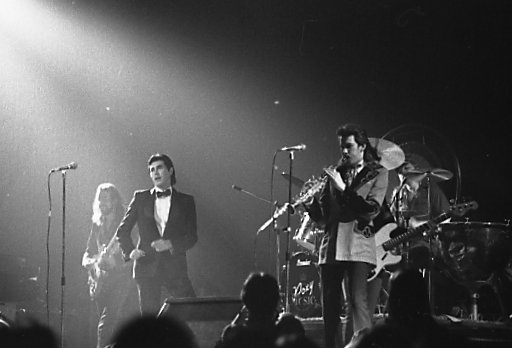
Roxy Music performing in 1974

The fourth album, Country Life, was released in 1974, and was the first Roxy Music album to enter the US Top 40 of the Billboard 200, albeit at No. 37. Country Life was met with widespread critical acclaim, with Rolling Stone referring to it "as if Ferry ran a cabaret for psychotics, featuring chanteurs in a state of shock". Roxy Music's fifth album Siren (1975) contained their only US Top 40 hit on the Billboard Hot 100, "Love Is the Drug", while Jobson received his only writing credit in Roxy Music on the song "She Sells", a co-write with Ferry. The album cover featured American model Jerry Hall, who became Ferry's girlfriend and eventual fiancée, before leaving him for Mick Jagger of the Rolling Stones in 1977.

After the concert tours in support of Siren in 1976, Roxy Music disbanded. Their live album Viva! was released in August 1976. In 1976, Manzanera reunited with Eno on the critically acclaimed one-off 801 Live album.

=== Final studio albums and hiatus (1978–1983) ===
Roxy Music reunited during 1978 to record a new studio album, Manifesto, but with a reshuffled line-up. Jobson was reportedly not contacted for the reunion; at the time, he was touring and recording with his own band, U.K.. The core band of Ferry, Mackay, Manzanera and Thompson were augmented by Paul Carrack on keyboards, with bass split between Alan Spenner and Gary Tibbs. Tibbs and keyboardist Dave Skinner played on the subsequent tour.

Three singles were issued from Manifesto, including the major UK hits "Angel Eyes" (UK No. 4), and "Dance Away" (UK No. 2). Both these tracks are significantly different from the album versions, as "Dance Away" was remixed for single release, and "Angel Eyes" was entirely re-recorded, with a disco, rather than rock, arrangement.

After the tour and before the recording of the next album, Flesh + Blood (1980), Thompson broke his thumb in a motorcycle mishap and took a leave from the band. After Ferry, Mackay and Manzanera completed the album with several session drummers, Thompson rejoined them, briefly, in the spring of 1980, and made some television appearances as part of the album's early promotion. By the time the Flesh + Blood tour properly began, Thompson had left again due to musical differences with Ferry.

At this point, the band officially became a core trio of Ferry, Mackay and Manzanera, augmented by a variety of musicians over the next few years, including Alan Spenner, Gary Tibbs, Paul Carrack, drummer Andy Newmark and guitarist Neil Hubbard. Flesh + Blood became a huge commercial success in their homeland, as the album went to No. 1 on the UK charts, and spun off three UK hits: "Oh Yeah" (UK No. 5), "Over You" (UK No. 5), and "Same Old Scene" (UK No. 12).

However, the band's new reliance on expert session musicians (a situation favoured by Ferry and grudgingly tolerated by Mackay and Manzenera), caused a distinct change in Roxy Music's musical style, becoming smoother and more slick than their earlier work. The change of direction received mixed critical reception, with Rolling Stone panning Manifesto ("Roxy Music has not gone disco. Roxy Music has not particularly gone anywhere else either.") as well as Flesh + Blood ("such a shockingly bad Roxy Music record that it provokes a certain fascination"), while others were more positive, including Melody Maker, who said of Manifesto, "...reservations aside, this may be the first such return bout ever attempted with any degree of genuine success: a technical knockout against the odds."

In 1981, Roxy Music recorded the non-album single "Jealous Guy". A cover version of a song written and originally recorded by John Lennon, Roxy Music recorded "Jealous Guy" as a tribute to Lennon after his 1980 murder. The song topped the UK Singles Chart for two weeks in March 1981, becoming the band's only No. 1 single.

Later, with more sombre and carefully sculpted soundscapes, the band's eighth and final studio album, Avalon (1982), recorded at Chris Blackwell's Compass Point Studios, was a major commercial success and restored the group's critical reputation. The album included the successful single "More Than This", as well as several other Roxy Music classics, such as "Avalon", "The Main Thing", "The Space Between", "True to Life", and "To Turn You On". Avalon reached No. 1 on the UK Albums Chart and was certified Platinum in the United States and Canada. It was widely praised by critics for its atmospheric production and mature songwriting, often cited as the band's most refined work. In 2003, Rolling Stone ranked it among the "100 Greatest Albums of the 1980s."

Ferry, Mackay and Manzanera (augmented by several additional players) toured extensively from August 1982 to May 1983, with the Avalon tour being documented on the band's second live album The High Road, released in March 1983. A home video, also titled The High Road, captured an August 1982 show at Fréjus where Roxy Music co-headlined with King Crimson (whose set from the same show was released on home video as The Noise). A further live album from this tour, Heart Still Beating, was released in 1990.

After completion of the Avalon tour, Roxy Music dissolved. For the next eighteen years Ferry, Mackay and Manzanera all devoted themselves full-time to solo careers. The 1986 compilation album Street Life: 20 Great Hits, which mixed Roxy Music and Ferry solo hits, reached No. 1 in the UK, while a Roxy Music retrospective box set, The Thrill of It All, was released in 1995.

=== Reunions (2001–2011, 2019, 2022) ===
Ferry, Manzanera, Mackay and Thompson re-formed in 2001 to celebrate the 30th anniversary of the band, and toured extensively. A festival performance in Portugal and a short tour of the United States followed. Absent was Brian Eno, who criticised the motives of the band's reunion, saying, "I just don't like the idea. It leaves a bad taste". Later Eno remarked that his comment had been taken out of context. Manzanera and Thompson recorded and toured with Ferry on his eleventh solo studio album Frantic (2002). Eno also contributed to Frantic on the track "I Thought".

During 2002, Image Entertainment, Inc., released the concert DVD Roxy Music Live at the Apollo featuring performances of 20 songs plus interviews and rehearsal footage.

In 2004, Rolling Stone magazine ranked the group No. 98 on its list of the 100 Greatest Artists of All Time.

Roxy Music gave a live performance at the Isle of Wight Festival 2005 on 11 June 2005, their first UK concert since the 2001–2002 world tour. On 2 July 2005, the band played "Jealous Guy", "Do the Strand", and "Love is the Drug" at the Berlin contribution to Live 8; "Do the Strand" is available on the four-disc DVD collection, and "Love Is the Drug" can be found on the Live 8 Berlin DVD.

In March 2005, it was announced on Phil Manzanera's official site that the band, including Brian Eno, had decided to record an album of new material. The project would mark the first time Eno worked with Roxy Music since 1973's For Your Pleasure. After a number of denials that he would be involved with any Roxy Music reunion, on 19 May 2006 Eno revealed that he had contributed two songs to the new album as well as playing keyboards on other tracks. He did, however, rule out touring with the band.

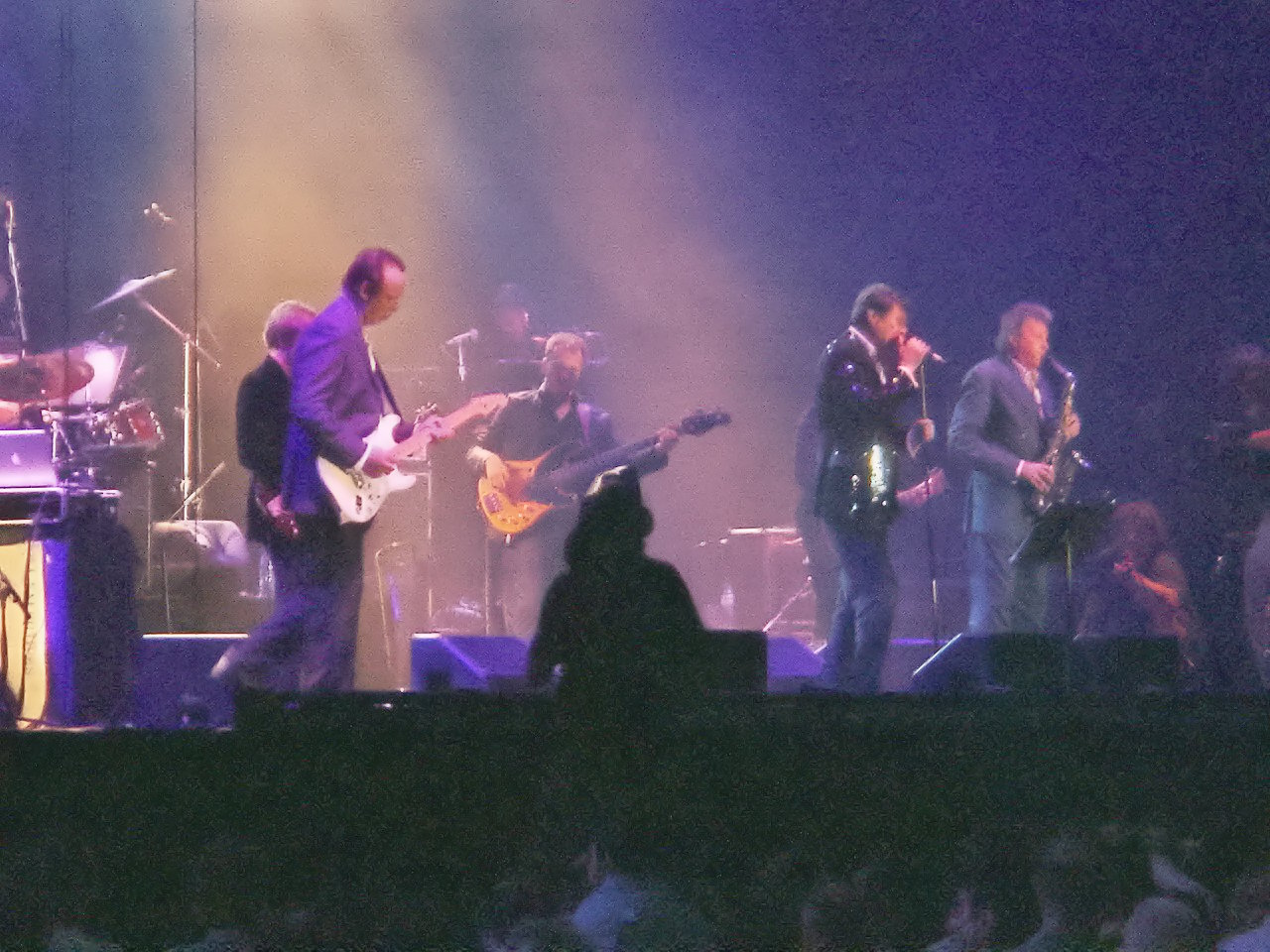
Roxy Music on stage during concert at London's ExCeL Exhibition Centre, July 2006

During early 2006 a classic Roxy Music track, "The Main Thing", was remixed by Malcolm Green and used as the soundtrack to a pan-European television commercial for the Opel Vectra featuring celebrated football referee Pierluigi Collina. In July that year, the band toured Europe. They concentrated mostly on places they had never visited before, such as Serbia and North Macedonia. Drummer Andy Newmark, who had been one of the many additional musicians Roxy Music worked with during the 1979–1983 period, performed during the tour, as Thompson withdrew due to health issues, and Oliver Thompson (guitar) made his first appearance with the band.

In a March 2007 interview, Ferry confirmed that the next Roxy Music album was definitely being made, but would not be released for another "year and a half", as he had just released and toured behind his twelfth solo studio album, Dylanesque, consisting of Bob Dylan covers. In October that year, Ferry said the album would include a collaboration with Scissor Sisters. In 2009, he announced that the material from these sessions would instead be released as a Ferry solo studio album, with Eno playing on "a couple of tracks". The album was released in 2010 as the Ferry solo studio album Olympia. It featured contributions from Eno, Manzanera, and Mackay (amongst many other session players).

Over the summer of 2010, Roxy Music headlined various festivals across the world, including Lovebox at London's Victoria Park, Electric Picnic in Stradbally, County Laois, Ireland, and Bestival on the Isle of Wight. Owing to illness, Thompson was replaced on three dates of the tour by Andy Newmark, but returned for the Bestival set.

Roxy Music performed seven dates around the UK in January and February 2011, in a tour billed For Your Pleasure, to celebrate the band's 40th anniversary. They toured Australia and New Zealand between February and March for a further eight shows.

In 2012, Virgin Records released a box set entitled Roxy Music: The Complete Studio Recordings 1972–1982, celebrating 40 years since the release of the band's debut in 1972.

In a Rolling Stone Magazine interview on 3 November 2014, Manzanera stated that Roxy Music had been inactive since 2011 and were unlikely to perform together again. Of a new studio album, he told Classic Rock, "We all listened to it and thought, 'We can't do this. It's not going to be any good. Let's just bin it.' And so it's just sitting there on our personal computers. Maybe one day it'll get finished. But there's no point in putting it out if it's not great."

On 29 March 2019, Roxy Music were inducted to the Rock and Roll Hall of Fame, with Ferry, Mackay, Manzanera and Eddie Jobson performing a six-song set at the Barclays Center in Brooklyn, New York.

Roxy Music reformed in 2022 for a 50th anniversary tour of the United Kingdom and the United States to be held that autumn. Most North American tour dates featured St. Vincent as a supporting act. Nilüfer Yanya was the UK starter act.

== Style ==
Roxy Music have been associated with a range of genres including art rock, glam rock, pop rock, progressive rock, art pop, new wave, soft rock, synth-pop and sophisti-pop. The early style and presentation of Roxy Music was influenced by the art school backgrounds of its principal members. Ferry, Mackay and Eno all had studied at prominent UK art colleges during the mid-to-late 1960s, when these institutions were introducing courses that avoided traditional art teaching practice, with its emphasis on painting, and instead focused on more recent developments, most notably pop art, and explored new concepts such as cybernetics. As writer Michael Bracewell notes in his book Roxy: The Band that Invented an Era, Roxy Music was created expressly by Ferry, Mackay and Eno as a means of combining their mutual interests in music, modern art and fashion.

Ferry studied at Newcastle University in the 1960s under renowned pop artist and educator Richard Hamilton, and many of Ferry's university friends, classmates and tutors—e.g. Rita Donagh and Tim Head—became well-known artists in their own right. Eno studied at Winchester School of Art and although his iconoclastic style became apparent early and caused some conflict with the college establishment, it also resulted in him meeting important artists and musicians including Cornelius Cardew and Gavin Bryars. His interest in electronic music also resulted in his first meetings with Andy Mackay, who was studying at University of Reading and who had likewise developed a strong interest in avant-garde and electronic music.

The three eventually joined forces in London during 1970–71 after meeting through mutual friends and decided to form a rock band.

Roxy Music were initially influenced by other artists of the time including the Beatles, the Kinks, the Rolling Stones, the Yardbirds, David Bowie, Elton John, the Animals, Pink Floyd, Deep Purple, King Crimson, Jimi Hendrix, the Velvet Underground and the Who, as well as American rock and roll acts and genres such as Elvis Presley and Motown. Ferry stated that Roxy Music's unique sound came as a result of the diverse and eclectic musical backgrounds of the band's members; "I had lots of musical influences, Phil Manzanera had this Latin heritage, being born in South America. Saxophone and oboe player Andy Mackay was classically trained. Eno with his deep interest in experimental music. They were specialists in their field. Paul Thompson brought a lot, with his very powerful, earthy drumming."

Roxy Music were one of the first rock music groups to create and maintain a carefully crafted look and style, which included their stage presentation, music videos, album and single cover designs, and promotional materials such as posters, handbills, cards and badges. They were assisted in this by a group of friends and associates who helped to sculpt the classic Roxy Music 'look', notably fashion designer Antony Price, hair stylist Keith Mainwaring, photographer Karl Stoecker, the group's "PR consultant" Simon Puxley (a former university friend of Mackay) and Ferry's art school classmate Nicholas de Ville. Well-known critic Lester Bangs went so far as to say that Roxy Music represented "the triumph of artifice". Ferry later attributed the band's look to his interest in American music and popular culture icons including Marilyn Monroe, Motown and Stax Records artists. He also stated he wanted to create an alternative image to publicity shots of pop and rock groups at the time which would feature artists "in a dreary street, looking rather sullen. Which was the norm."

The band's self-titled debut album, produced by King Crimson's Pete Sinfield, was the first in a series of albums with increasingly sophisticated covers, with art direction by Ferry in collaboration with his friend Nick De Ville. The album artwork imitated the visual style of classic "girlie" and fashion magazines, featuring high-fashion shots of scantily clad models Amanda Lear, Marilyn Cole and Jerry Hall, each of whom had romances with Ferry during the time of their contributions, as well as model Kari-Ann Moller who appears on the cover of the first Roxy Music studio album but who was not otherwise involved with anyone in the band, and who later married Mick Jagger's brother Chris. The title of the fourth Roxy Music studio album, Country Life, was intended as a parody of the well-known British rural magazine Country Life, and the visually punning front cover photo featured two models (two German fans, Constanze Karoli—sister of Can's Michael Karoli—and Eveline Grunwald) clad only in semi-transparent lingerie standing against an evergreen hedge. As a result, in many areas of the US the album was sold in an opaque plastic wrapper because retailers refused to display the cover. Later, an alternative cover, featuring just a picture of the forest, was used.

== Legacy and influence ==
In 2005, Tim de Lisle of The Guardian argued that Roxy Music are the second most influential British band after the Beatles. He wrote, "Somehow, in a landscape dominated by Led Zeppelin at one end and the Osmonds at the other, they managed to reach the Top 10 with a heady mixture of futurism, retro rock'n'roll, camp, funny noises, silly outfits, art techniques, film references and oboe solos. And although their popularity has ebbed and flowed, their influence has been strikingly consistent." In 2019, The Economist also described them as "the best British art-rock band since the Beatles", arguing that "among English rock acts of that time, their spirit of adventure and their impact" was "surpassed only" by David Bowie. Bowie himself cited Roxy Music as one of his favourite British groups and in a 1975 television interview described Bryan Ferry as "spearheading some of the best music to come out of England."

Roxy Music's sound and visual style have been described as a significant influence on later genres and subcultures such as electronic music, punk rock, disco, new wave and new romantic. They were a major influence on the next generation of bands such as Duran Duran, Simple Minds, The Human League and ABC, with members declaring their admiration of the band and its influence on their work. They were an influence on the early 1980s British new romantic-movement with bands such as Ultravox, Visage and Spandau Ballet, as well as new wave art rock-bands such as Magazine, Cabaret Voltaire, and the American bands Devo and Talking Heads.

Madness are among the artists that have cited Roxy Music as an influence. They paid tribute to Bryan Ferry in the song "4BF" (the title is a reference to the song "2HB", itself a tribute to Humphrey Bogart from the first Roxy Music studio album). Other artists who have cited or been described as influenced by Roxy Music include OMD, Echo & the Bunnymen, Bauhaus, Melvins, Wire, Parquet Courts, Crime, Nile Rodgers, Siouxsie and the Banshees, U2, the Smiths, Radiohead, Scissor Sisters, Imogen Heap, Goldfrapp, Pulp, Sex Pistols, Todd Terje and Franz Ferdinand.

In 1997, bassist John Taylor of Duran Duran produced the tribute album Dream Home Heartaches... Remaking/Remodeling Roxy Music. The compilation features Taylor as well as Dave Gahan (Depeche Mode) and Low Pop Suicide, among others.

Sex Pistols guitarist Steve Jones named his first band the Strand after the Roxy Music song Do the Strand. Jones has also described Roxy Music's style as a strong influence on the later punk craze of which he would go on to become a part, and cited their first album as one of his all-time favourites.

The electronic band Ladytron took their name from the title of a song from Roxy Music's first album.

The British band Bananarama took their name, in part, from the Roxy Music song "Pyjamarama".

=== Cultural legacy and fashion influence ===
Roxy Music's emphasis on style, glamour, and artifice played a key role in shaping the visual language of 1970s and 1980s pop culture. Frontman Bryan Ferry's suave image and the band's fashion-forward album covers, often featuring models in provocative poses, influenced both the glam rock and New Romantic movements. Fashion designer Antony Price, who worked closely with the band, helped define their iconic look. The band's art-directed aesthetic has been referenced by designers such as Hedi Slimane and Raf Simons, and was an early model of fashion-music collaboration later popularised by artists like Madonna and Lady Gaga.

== Members ==
- Bryan Ferry – vocals, keyboards, piano, harmonica, occasional rhythm guitar (1970–1976, 1978–1983, 2001–2011, 2022)
- Andy Mackay – saxophone, oboe, keyboards, backing vocals (1970–1976, 1978–1983, 2001–2011, 2022)
- Brian Eno – synthesizer, treatments, backing vocals (1970–1973)
- Graham Simpson – bass, backing vocals (1970–1972; died 2012)
- Paul Thompson – drums (1971–1976, 1978–1979, 1980, 2001–2011, 2022)
- Phil Manzanera – lead guitar, occasional backing vocals, bass (1972–1976, 1978–1983, 2001–2011, 2022)
- Rik Kenton – bass, backing vocals (1972–1973)
- Eddie Jobson – synthesizer, keyboards, violin, backing vocals (1973–1976)

== Discography ==
Studio albums

- Roxy Music (1972)
- For Your Pleasure (1973)
- Stranded (1973)
- Country Life (1974)
- Siren (1975)
- Manifesto (1979)
- Flesh and Blood (1980)
- Avalon (1982)

== General and cited references ==
- Bracewell, Michael (2007). Roxy Music: Bryan Ferry, Brian Eno, Art, Ideas, and Fashion. Da Capo Press. ISBN 978-0-306-81400-6.
- Buckley, David (2004). The Thrill of It All: The Story of Bryan Ferry and Roxy Music. André Deutsch. ISBN 0-233-05113-9.
- Rigby, Jonathan (2008) [First ed. 2005]. Roxy Music: Both Ends Burning (Revised ed.). Reynolds & Hearn. ISBN 978-1-903111-80-2.
- Stump, Paul (1998). Unknown Pleasures: A Cultural Biography of Roxy Music. Quartet Books. ISBN 0-7043-8074-9.
