= Dance Away =

Single by Roxy Music

from the album Manifesto
- B-side: "Cry, Cry, Cry" (Europe); "Trash 2" (US, Canada, Japan)
- Released: 12 April 1979
- Recorded: 1978–1979
- Studio: Ridge Farm (Rusper); Basing Street (London)
- Genre: Soft rock; pop
- Length: 4:21 (Album version); 3:48 (7" single); 6:29 (12" extended remix)
- Label: Island; Polydor
- Songwriter: Bryan Ferry
- Producer: Roxy Music

Roxy Music singles chronology
"Trash" (1979)	"Dance Away" (1979)	"Angel Eyes" (1979)

Music video
- "Dance Away" on YouTube

"Dance Away" is a song by the English rock band Roxy Music. Released in April 1979, it was the second single to be taken from their sixth studio album Manifesto, and became one of the band's most famous songs, reaching number two in the UK and spending a total of 14 weeks on the charts, the longest chart residency of a Roxy Music single. Although it did not make number one, it became the ninth biggest selling single in the UK in 1979. It did make it to number one on the Irish Singles Chart and held that position for one week.

== Background ==
"Dance Away" was originally written by Bryan Ferry for his fourth solo studio album In Your Mind (1977), but did not make the final track listing. It was then planned for inclusion on his follow studio album The Bride Stripped Bare (1978), but again was not included. It was finally completed and released on Roxy Music's Manifesto, the band's first studio album in four years.

== Critical reception ==
Cashbox said it is "Roxy Music's most commercial effort to date" and that the highlights are "Andy Mackay's sax lines, Phil Manzanera's guitar treatments and an entrancing percussive' sound."

== Versions ==
The single version was a different shorter edit and mix compared to the original album version. As with their next single "Angel Eyes", the single version of "Dance Away" replaced the album version in subsequent releases.

The 1999 re-mastered version of the Manifesto studio album restored the original version of "Angel Eyes", but still retained the single mix of "Dance Away" in place of the original.

Thus the 1995 Thrill of It All box set was the only release on which the LP version of the song could be found, until the release of the box set The Complete Studio Recordings 1972–1982 in 2012. The Thrill of it All album also includes an extended (6.29 minutes) version.

== Personnel ==
- Bryan Ferry – vocals, keyboards
- Andy Mackay – oboe, saxophone
- Phil Manzanera – electric guitar
- Alan Spenner – bass
- Richard Tee – piano
- Rick Marotta – drums
- Steve Ferrone – percussion, claves
- Luther Vandross – vocals

== Chart performance ==
Chart (1979)	Peak position
Ireland (IRMA)	1
UK Singles (The Official Charts Company)	2
US Billboard Easy Listening	38
US Billboard Hot 100	44

== Certifications ==
Certifications and sales for "Dance Away"
Region	Certification	Certified units/sales
New Zealand (RMNZ)	Gold	15,000^{‡}
^{‡} Sales+streaming figures based on certification alone.
