= List of Roxy Music members =

English rock band members

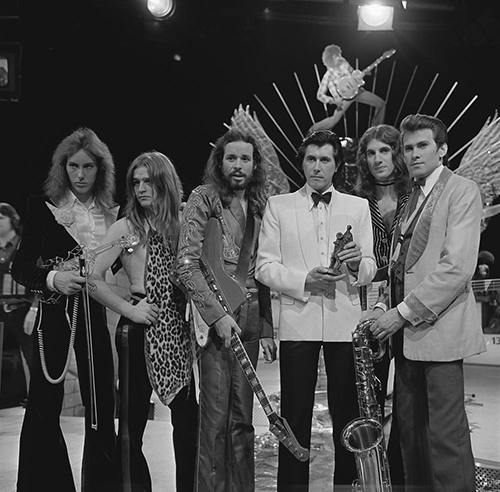
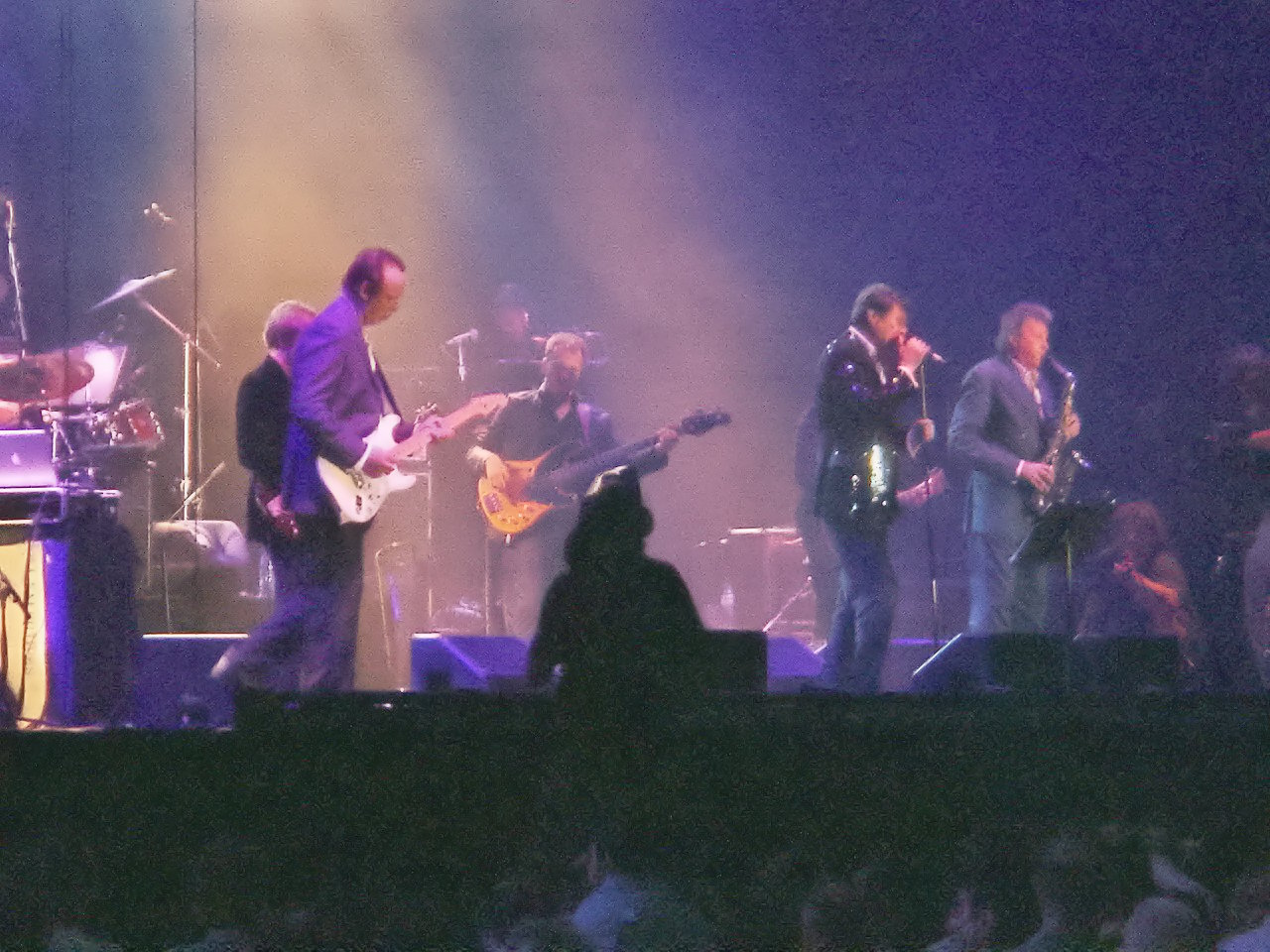
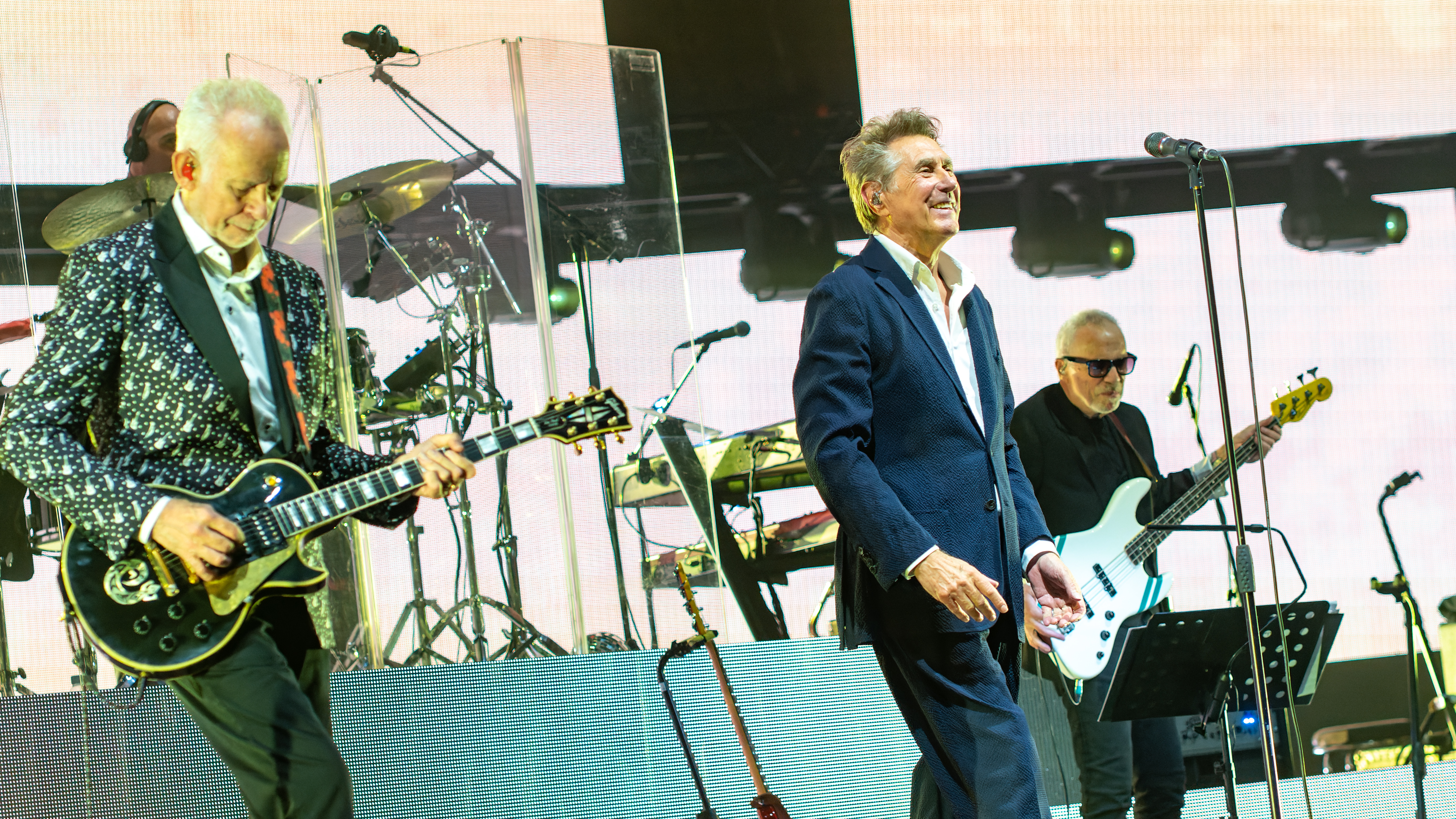
Roxy Music in 1973, 2006 and 2022.

Roxy Music are an English rock band formed by in 1970 by singer Bryan Ferry and bassist Graham Simpson, who were soon joined by saxophonist Andy Mackay, synthesizer player Brian Eno, guitarist Roger Bunn and drummer Dexter Lloyd. By the time the band recorded their first album in 1972, Bunn and Lloyd had both departed, with drummer Paul Thompson (who joined in 1971) and guitarist Phil Manzanera (who joined just before recording began in 1972) alongside Ferry, Simpson, Mackay and Eno. The band split in 1976, reformed in 1978 and split again in 1983. Since 2001, Roxy Music has reformed several times for tours, but have not released any studio material since 1982's Avalon album. The band's current line-up, who last reunited in 2022, includes Ferry, Mackay, Thompson and Manzanera, augmented by backing musicians.

== History ==
=== 1970–1983 ===
In November 1970, Bryan Ferry, who had just lost his job teaching ceramics at a girls' school for holding impromptu record-listening sessions, advertised for a keyboardist to collaborate with him and Graham Simpson, a bassist he knew from his Newcastle art-college band, the Gas Board. Andy Mackay replied to Ferry's advertisement, not as a keyboardist but a saxophonist and oboist, though he did have a EMS VCS 3 synthesizer. Mackay had already met Brian Eno during university days, as both were interested in avant-garde and electronic music. Although Eno was a non-musician, he could operate a synthesizer and owned a Revox reel-to-reel tape machine, so Mackay convinced him to join the band as a technical adviser. Before long, Eno was an official member of the group. Rounding out the original sextet were guitarist Roger Bunn (who had issued the well-regarded solo studio album Piece of Mind earlier in 1970) and drummer Dexter Lloyd, a classically trained timpanist. In 1971, Roxy Music recorded a demo tape of some early compositions. In the spring of that year, Lloyd left the band, and an advertisement was placed in Melody Maker saying "wonder drummer wanted for an avant rock group". Paul Thompson responded to the advertisement and joined the band in June 1971. Bunn left the group at the end of the summer of 1971, and in October, Roxy advertised in Melody Maker seeking the "Perfect Guitarist". The successful applicant was David O'List, former guitarist with the Nice. Phil Manzanera—soon to become a group member—was one of about twenty other players who also auditioned. Although he did not initially make the band as a guitarist, the group were impressed enough with Manzanera that he was invited to become Roxy Music's roadie, an offer which he accepted. In December 1971, after a year of writing and rehearsing, Roxy Music began playing live, with their first show at the Friends of the Tate Gallery Christmas show in London. In early February 1972, O'List quit the group abruptly after an altercation with Paul Thompson, which took place at their audition for David Enthoven of E.G. Management. When O'List did not show up for the next rehearsal, Manzanera was asked to come along on the pretext of becoming the band's sound mixer. When he arrived, he was invited to play guitar and quickly realised that it was an informal audition. Unbeknownst to the rest of the group, Manzanera had learned their entire repertoire and as a result, he was immediately hired as O'List's permanent replacement, joining on 14 February 1972.

E.G. Management financed the recording of the tracks for their debut album, Roxy Music, recorded in March–April 1972 and produced by King Crimson lyricist Peter Sinfield. During the first half of 1972, bassist Graham Simpson became increasingly withdrawn and uncommunicative, which led to his leaving the band almost immediately after the recording of the debut album. He was replaced by Rik Kenton, who stayed with the band until the beginning of 1973. Ferry asked his former Gas Board bandmate John Porter to replace Kenton. Porter agreed to play bass with the band temporarily, but declined the offer to join permanently. He played on the second album For Your Pleasure, released in March 1973, and its subsequent tour.

In July 1973, Brian Eno left Roxy Music amidst increasing differences with Ferry. He was replaced by 18-year-old multi-instrumentalist Eddie Jobson, formerly of progressive rockers Curved Air, who played keyboards and electric violin. Roxy would also undergo several more changes in bassist over the next few years. The band's next three albums–Stranded (1973), Country Life (1974) and Siren (1975)– were recorded with John Gustafson (ex-Big Three, Merseybeats and Quatermass) on bass, though the only time he played live with Roxy Music was during the first half of the Siren tour in 1975. Other Roxy bassists during this period were Sal Maida on the 1973/74 Stranded tour, John Wetton (ex-Family and King Crimson, future Uriah Heep, U.K., Wishbone Ash and Asia member) on the 1974/75 Country Life tour, and Rick Wills (future Foreigner member) on the second half of the 1975/76 Siren tour. The Siren tour also saw the addition of backing singers Doreen Chanter and Jacquie Sullivan, nicknamed "The Sirens". Roxy Music disbanded in June 1976. Their live album Viva! was released two months later.

Roxy Music reunited during 1978 to record a new studio album, Manifesto. The band was now a core quartet of Ferry, Mackay, Manzanera and Thompson, augmented both in the studio and on stage by various backing musicians. Bassists Alan Spenner and Gary Tibbs (future Adam and the Ants member) and keyboardist Paul Carrack (ex-Ace, future Squeeze and Mike and the Mechanics member) are the only external musicians credited on the album, although it later came to light that a number of other musicians also contributed to the sessions. On the subsequent Manifesto tour, Tibbs and keyboardist Dave Skinner played alongside Ferry, Mackay, Manzanera and Thompson.

After the tour and before the recording of the next album, Flesh + Blood (1980), Thompson broke his thumb in a motorcycle mishap and took a leave from the band. After Ferry, Mackay and Manzanera completed the album with several session drummers, Thompson rejoined them, briefly, in the spring of 1980 and made some television appearances as part of the album's early promotion. By the time the Flesh + Blood tour properly began, Thompson had left again due to musical differences with Ferry. Roxy continued as a core trio of Ferry, Mackay and Manzanera, augmented by a variety of musicians over the next few years including Alan Spenner, Gary Tibbs, Paul Carrack, drummer Andy Newmark and guitarist Neil Hubbard. Later, with more sombre and carefully sculpted soundscapes, the band's eighth—and final—studio album, Avalon (1982), was recorded at Chris Blackwell's Compass Point Studios. Ferry, Mackay and Manzanera toured extensively from August 1982 to May 1983, with a backing band consisting of Newmark, Spenner, Hubbard, Jimmy Maelen (percussion), future Dire Straits member Guy Fletcher (keyboards) and Tawatha Agee, Michelle Cobbs and Fonzi Thornton (all backing vocals). The Avalon tour was documented on the live albums The High Road, released in March 1983, and Heart Still Beating, released in October 1990. Roxy Music officially split after completion of the tour in May 1983.

=== Reunions ===
Ferry, Manzanera, Mackay and Thompson re-formed in 2001 to celebrate the 30th anniversary of the band and toured extensively. Other musicians for their 2001 tour included Colin Good (piano), Zev Katz (bass), Julia Thornton (percussion, keyboards), Lucy Wilkins (keyboards, violin), Sarah Brown (backing vocals) and Chris Spedding (guitar).

Their 2003 tour included returning musicians Good, Spedding and Thornton, along with Mark Smith (bass), Louise Peacock (violin, keyboards) and Michelle John and Sharon White (backing vocals). Good, Spedding, Thornton and Peacock also stayed for their 2005 tour, alongside David Williams (guitar) Guy Pratt (bass) and Sarah Brown and Me'sha Bryan (backing vocals). Only Pratt stayed into 2006, alongside Andy Newmark (Drums; replacing the ailing Thompson), Oliver Thompson (guitar), Leo Abrahams (guitar) and Me'sha Bryan and Joy Malcolm (backing vocals) and Louise Clare Marshall (backing vocals & keyboards).

Roxy Music remained inactive until 2010 when they toured again with a band of Colin Good (piano and keyboards), Oliver Thompson (guitar), Sewuese Abwa Hannah Kemoh, Aleysha Lei (Gordon) (backing vocals), Anna Phobe (violin), Jerry Meehan (bass) and for three dates, Andy Newmark (drums). And again into 2011 with Colin Good (piano), Oliver Thompson (guitar), Jerry Meehan (bass), Sewuese Abwa (vocals), Aleysha Lei (Gordon) (vocals), Hannah Kemoh (vocals), Jorja Chalmers (keyboards & saxophone) and Tara Ferry (percussion). In a Rolling Stone Magazine interview on 3 November 2014, Manzanera stated that Roxy had been inactive since 2011 and were unlikely to perform together again. On 29 March 2019, Roxy Music were inducted to the Rock and Roll Hall of Fame, with Ferry, Mackay, Manzanera and Eddie Jobson performing a six-song set at the Barclays Center in Brooklyn, New York. The band included Jorja Chalmers (saxophone & keyboards), Luke Bullen (drums), Neil Jason (bass), Chris Spedding (guitar), Fonzi Thornton and Tawatha Agee (backing vocals); all musicians (minus Bullen) had performed with the band in the past.

Roxy Music reformed in 2022 for a 50th anniversary tour of the United Kingdom and the United States to be held that autumn. The band included Christian Gulino (musical director & keyboards), Tom Vanstiphout (guitar), Jorja Chalmers (sax & keys), Neil Jason (bass), Nathen 'Tugg' Curran (percussion), Chloe Beth Smith (keyboards) and Fonzi Thornton, Senab Adekunle and Phebe Edwards (backing vocals). For UK dates, Gulino was replaced by Richard Cardwell.

== Members ==
=== Official members ===
Image	Name	Years active	Instruments	Release contributions
	Bryan Ferry	1970–1976; 1978–1983; 2001–2011; 2019; 2022	vocals; keyboards; piano; harmonica; occasional guitar	all releases
	Andy Mackay	1970–1976; 1978–1983; 2001–2011; 2019; 2022	saxophone; oboe; keyboards; backing vocals	all releases
	Brian Eno	1970–1973	synthesizer; "treatments"; backing vocals	Roxy Music (1972); "Virginia Plain" (1972); "Pyjamarama" (1973); For Your Pleasure (1973)
	Graham Simpson	1970–1972 (died 2012)	bass	Roxy Music (1972)
	Roger Bunn	1970–1971	guitar	Roxy Music (1972) 40th anniversary deluxe reissue
	Dexter Lloyd	1970–1971	drums	Roxy Music (1972) 40th anniversary deluxe reissue
	Paul Thompson	1971–1976; 1978–1979; 1980; 2001–2006; 2006–2011; 2022	drums	all releases except Flesh and Blood (1980), "Jealous Guy" (1981), Avalon (1982), The High Road (1983) and Heart Still Beating (1990)
	David O'List	1971–1972	guitar	Roxy Music (1972) 40th anniversary deluxe reissue
	Phil Manzanera	1972–1976; 1978–1983; 2001–2011; 2019; 2022	lead guitar; occasional backing vocals and bass	all releases
	Rik Kenton	1972–1973	bass; backing vocals	"Virginia Plain" (1972); Roxy Music (1972) one track on North American release ("Virginia Plain")
	Eddie Jobson	1973–1976; 2019 (one-off)	keyboards; synthesizers; electric violin; backing vocals	Stranded (1973); Country Life (1974); Siren (1975); Viva! (1976)

=== Session and/or touring musicians ===
Image	Name	Years active	Instruments	Release contributions
	John Porter	1973	bass	"Pyjamarama" (1973); For Your Pleasure (1973)
	John Gustafson	1973; 1974; 1975 (died 2014)	bass	Stranded (1973) seven tracks; Country Life (1974); Siren (1975); Viva! (1976) one track ("Both Ends Burning")
	Chris Laurence	1973	bass	Stranded (1973) one track ("Sunset")
	Chris Thomas	1973	bass	Stranded (1973) one track ("Street Life")
	The London Welsh Male Voice Choir	1973	backing vocals	Stranded (1973) one track ("Psalm")
	Sal Maida	1973–1974 (died 2025)	bass	Viva! (1976) two tracks
	John Wetton	1974–1975 (died 2017)	bass; backing vocals	Viva! (1976) five tracks
	Doreen Chanter	1975	backing vocals	Viva! (1976) one track ("Both Ends Burning")
	Jacquie Sullivan	1975	backing vocals	Viva! (1976) one track ("Both Ends Burning")
	Rick Wills	1975–1976	bass; backing vocals	Viva! (1976) possible but unconfirmed studio overdubs
	Gary Tibbs	1978–1981	bass; backing vocals	Manifesto (1979) exact number of tracks unconfirmed; "Angel Eyes" (re-recorded single version 1979); Flesh and Blood (1980) one track ("In the Midnight Hour"); "Jealous Guy" (1981); On the Road (1990); Concert Classics (1998); Concerto (2001)
	Alan Spenner	1978–1979; 1979–1980; 1981–1983 (died 1991)	bass	Manifesto (1979) exact number of tracks unconfirmed; Flesh and Blood (1980) five tracks; Avalon (1982) six tracks; The High Road (1983); Heart Still Beating (1990)
	Rick Marotta	1978–1979; 1981–1982	drums	Manifesto (1979) exact number of tracks unconfirmed; Avalon (1982) one track ("To Turn You On")
	Steve Ferrone	1978–1979	drums, percussion	Manifesto (1979) exact number of tracks for all these musicians unconfirmed
	Melissa Manchester	1978–1979	backing vocals	Manifesto (1979) exact number of tracks for all these musicians unconfirmed
	Luther Vandross	1978–1979 (died 2005)	backing vocals	Manifesto (1979) exact number of tracks for all these musicians unconfirmed
	Richard Tee	1978–1979 (died 1993)	piano	Manifesto (1979) exact number of tracks for all these musicians unconfirmed
	Paul Carrack	1978–1979; 1979–1980; 1981–1982	keyboards; backing vocals	Manifesto (1979) exact number of tracks unconfirmed; "Angel Eyes" (re-recorded single version 1979); Flesh and Blood (1980) two tracks; Avalon (1982) one track ("To Turn You On")
	Dave Skinner	1979; 1980–1981	keyboards; backing vocals	"Jealous Guy" (1981); On the Road (1990); Concert Classics (1998); Concerto (2001)
	Fiona Hibbert	1979	harp	"Angel Eyes" (re-recorded single version 1979)
	Neil Hubbard	1979–1981; 1981–1983	guitar	Flesh and Blood (1980) six tracks; Avalon (1982) nine tracks; The High Road (1983); Heart Still Beating (1990)
	Neil Jason	1979–1980; 1981–1982; 2019; 2022	bass	Flesh and Blood (1980) three tracks; Avalon (1982) four tracks
	Simon Phillips	1979–1980	percussion	Flesh and Blood (1980) one track ("My Only Love")
	Allan Schwartzberg	1979–1980	drums; percussion	Flesh and Blood (1980)
	Andy Newmark	1979–1980; 1981–1983; 2006	drums	Flesh and Blood (1980) two tracks; Avalon (1982) eight tracks; The High Road (1983); Heart Still Beating (1990)
	Michael Dawe	1980–1981	drums	"Jealous Guy" (1981)
	Jimmy Maelen	1981–1983 (died 1988)	percussion	Avalon (1982) six tracks; The High Road (1983); Heart Still Beating (1990)
	Kermit Moore	1981–1982 (died 2013)	cello	Avalon (1982) one track ("To Turn You On")
	Fonzi Thornton	1981–1983; 2019; 2022	backing vocals	Avalon (1982) six tracks; The High Road (1983); Heart Still Beating (1990)
	Yanick Étienne	1981–1982 (died 2022)	backing vocals	Avalon (1982) one track ("Avalon")
	Tawatha Agee	1982–1983; 2019	backing vocals	The High Road (1983); Heart Still Beating (1990)
	Michelle Cobbs	1982–1983	backing vocals	The High Road (1983); Heart Still Beating (1990)
	Guy Fletcher	1982–1983	keyboards; backing vocals	The High Road (1983); Heart Still Beating (1990)
	Colin Good	2001–2005; 2010–2011	piano; backing vocals	Live at the Apollo (2002); Live (2003)
	Chris Spedding	2001–2005; 2019	guitar	Live at the Apollo (2002); Live (2003)
	Julia Thornton	2001–2005	percussion; keyboards; backing vocals	Live at the Apollo (2002); Live (2003)
	Zev Katz	2001	bass	Live at the Apollo (2002); Live (2003)
	Lucy Wilkins	2001	violin; keyboards; backing vocals	Live at the Apollo (2002); Live (2003)
	Sarah Brown	2001; 2005	backing vocals	Live at the Apollo (2002); Live (2003)
	Vicky Akpewrene	2001 (substitute)	backing vocals	none
	Louise Peacock	2003–2005	violin; keyboards	none
	Mark Smith	2003 (died 2009)	bass	none
	Michelle John	2003	backing vocals	none
	Sharon White	2003	backing vocals	none
	Guy Pratt	2005–2006	bass	none
	Me'sha Bryan	2005–2006	backing vocals	none
	David Williams	2005	guitar	none
	Oliver Thompson	2006–2011	guitar	none
	Leo Abrahams	2006	guitar	none
	Louise Clare Marshall	2006	backing vocals; keyboards	none
	Joy Malcolm	2006	backing vocals	none
	Sewuese Abwa	2010–2011	backing vocals	none
	Hannah Kemoh	2010–2011	backing vocals	none
	Aleysha Lei (Gordon)	2010–2011	backing vocals	none
	Jerry Meehan	2010–2011	bass	none
	Anna Phoebe	2010	violin	none
	Jorja Chalmers	2011; 2019; 2022	keyboards; saxophone	none
	Tara Ferry	2011	percussion	none
	Tom Vanstiphout	2022	guitar	none
	Nathen 'Tugg' Curran	2022	percussion	none
	Chloe Beth Smith	2022	keyboards	none
	Senab Adekunle	2022	backing vocals	none
	Phebe Edwards	2022	backing vocals	none
	Christian Gulino	2022	keyboards; musical director	none
	Richard Cardwell	2022	keyboards; musical director	none

=== Miscellaneous ===
Image	Name			Details
	Peter Paul	1972	bass	Paul played bass with Roxy Music at a BBC radio session on 23 May 1972, recorded in between Graham Simpson leaving and Rik Kenton joining.
	Michael Dempsey	1979; 1982	bass	Dempsey appeared with Roxy Music on Will Kenny Everett Make it to 1980? in 1979, miming to Gary Tibbs' bass on "In the Midnight Hour", and in the official music video for "Avalon" in 1982, miming to Alan Spenner's bass. Dempsey also made several other television appearances with the band during 1982, in all cases miming to recordings with other bassists.
	Howie Casey	1980	saxophone	Casey stood in for Andy Mackay at a mimed 1980 Top of the Pops appearance for "Over You".
	Dave Early	1980	drums	Early appeared with Roxy Music on a 1980 episode of TopPop, miming to Allan Schwartzberg's drums on "Same Old Scene".
	Phil Gould	1982	drums	Gould is the drummer in the official music video for "More than This" and the band's Top of the Pops appearance for the same song in 1982. In both cases, Gould was miming to Andy Newmark's drumming.
	Tony Levin	1982	bass	Levin appeared with Roxy Music on the same Top of the Pops appearance as Gould, miming to Alan Spenner's bass on "More Than This".
	Steve Goulding	1982	drums	Goulding is the drummer in the 1982 "Avalon" music video and several television appearances with Roxy Music during the same year, in all cases miming to Andy Newmark's drumming.
	Martha Ladly	1982	vocals	Ladly appeared with Roxy Music on Top of the Pops and the French television show Champs-Élysée in 1982, in both appearances miming to Yanick Étienne's vocals on "Avalon".
	Luke Bullen	2019	drums	Bullen played drums with Roxy Music at their induction into the Rock and Roll Hall of Fame as Paul Thompson was unable to attend.

== Line-ups ==
Period (Work undertaken)	Members	Releases
December 1970 – June 1971 (Early rehearsals)	Bryan Ferry - vocals, keyboards; Andy Mackay - oboe, saxophone; Brian Eno - synthesizer; Graham Simpson - bass; Roger Bunn - guitar; Dexter Lloyd - drums	none
July – September 1971 (Early rehearsals)	Bryan Ferry - vocals, keyboards; Andy Mackay - oboe, saxophone; Brian Eno - synthesizer; Graham Simpson - bass; Roger Bunn - guitar; Paul Thompson - drums	none
October 1971 – January 1972 (Early gigs)	Bryan Ferry - vocals, keyboards; Andy Mackay - oboe, saxophone; Brian Eno - synthesizer; Graham Simpson - bass; Paul Thompson - drums; David O'List - guitar	none
February – April 1972 (First album)	Bryan Ferry - vocals, keyboards; Andy Mackay - oboe, saxophone; Brian Eno - synthesizer; Graham Simpson - bass; Paul Thompson - drums; Phil Manzanera - guitar	Roxy Music (1972)
May 1972 (One gig)	Bryan Ferry - vocals, keyboards; Andy Mackay - oboe, saxophone; Brian Eno - synthesizer; Paul Thompson - drums; Phil Manzanera - guitar; with: Peter Paul - bass	none
May 1972 – January 1973 (First tour, "Virginia Plain" single)	Bryan Ferry - vocals, keyboards; Andy Mackay - oboe, saxophone; Brian Eno - synthesizer; Paul Thompson - drums; Phil Manzanera - guitar; Rik Kenton - bass	"Virginia Plain" (1972)
February – July 1973 ("Pyjamarama" single, For Your Pleasure album and tour)	Bryan Ferry - vocals, keyboards; Andy Mackay - oboe, saxophone; Brian Eno - synthesizer; Paul Thompson - drums; Phil Manzanera - guitar; with: John Porter - bass	"Pyjamarama" (1973); For Your Pleasure (1973)
August – September 1973 (Stranded album)	Bryan Ferry - vocals, keyboards; Andy Mackay - oboe, saxophone; Paul Thompson - drums; Phil Manzanera - guitar; Eddie Jobson - synthesizer, keyboards, violin; with: John Gustafson - bass; Chris Laurence - bass; Chris Thomas - bass; The London Welsh Male Voice Choir - backing vocals	Stranded (1973)
October 1973 – June 1974 (Stranded tour)	Bryan Ferry - vocals, keyboards; Andy Mackay - oboe, saxophone; Paul Thompson - drums; Phil Manzanera - guitar; Eddie Jobson - synthesizer, keyboards, violin; with: Sal Maida - bass	Viva! (1976) (2 tracks)
July – August 1974 (Country Life album)	Bryan Ferry - vocals, keyboards; Andy Mackay - oboe, saxophone; Paul Thompson - drums; Phil Manzanera - guitar; Eddie Jobson - synthesizer, keyboards, violin; with: John Gustafson - bass	Country Life (1974)
September 1974 – March 1975 (Country Life tour)	Bryan Ferry - vocals, keyboards; Andy Mackay - oboe, saxophone; Paul Thompson - drums; Phil Manzanera - guitar; Eddie Jobson - synthesizer, keyboards, violin; with: John Wetton - bass	Viva! (1976) (5 tracks)
April – July 1975 (Siren album)	Bryan Ferry - vocals, keyboards; Andy Mackay - oboe, saxophone; Paul Thompson - drums; Phil Manzanera - guitar; Eddie Jobson - synthesizer, keyboards, violin; with: John Gustafson - bass	Siren (1975)
August – December 1975 (First half of Siren tour)	Bryan Ferry - vocals, keyboards; Andy Mackay - oboe, saxophone; Paul Thompson - drums; Phil Manzanera - guitar; Eddie Jobson - synthesizer, keyboards, violin; with: John Gustafson - bass; Doreen Chanter – backing vocals; Jacquie Sullivan – backing vocals	Viva! (1976) (1 track)
January – July 1976 (Second half of Siren tour)	Bryan Ferry - vocals, keyboards; Andy Mackay - oboe, saxophone; Paul Thompson - drums; Phil Manzanera - guitar; Eddie Jobson - synthesizer, keyboards, violin; with: Rick Wills - bass	Viva! (1976) (possible but unconfirmed studio overdubs)
Band inactive August 1976 – October 1978
November 1978 – January 1979 (Manifesto album)	Bryan Ferry - vocals, keyboards; Andy Mackay - oboe, saxophone; Paul Thompson - drums; Phil Manzanera - guitar; with: Gary Tibbs – bass; Paul Carrack – keyboards; Steve Ferrone – drums, percussion; Melissa Manchester – backing vocals; Rick Marotta – drums; Alan Spenner – bass; Richard Tee – piano; Luther Vandross – backing vocals	Manifesto (1979)
February – April 1979 (Manifesto tour)	Bryan Ferry - vocals, keyboards; Andy Mackay - oboe, saxophone; Paul Thompson - drums; Phil Manzanera - guitar; with: Gary Tibbs – bass; Dave Skinner – keyboards	none
Summer 1979 ("Angel Eyes" re-recorded single version)	Bryan Ferry - vocals, keyboards; Andy Mackay - oboe, saxophone; Paul Thompson - drums; Phil Manzanera - guitar; with: Gary Tibbs – bass; Paul Carrack – keyboards; Fiona Hibbert – harp	"Angel Eyes" (re-recorded single version 1979)
Late 1979 – early 1980 (Flesh and Blood album)	Bryan Ferry - vocals, keyboards; Andy Mackay - oboe, saxophone; Phil Manzanera - guitars; with: Gary Tibbs – bass; Paul Carrack – keyboards; Alan Spenner – bass; Neil Hubbard – guitar; Neil Jason – bass; Andy Newmark – drums; Simon Phillips – percussion; Allan Schwartzberg – drums, percussion	Flesh and Blood (1980)
March – April 1980 (Flesh and Blood tour rehearsals)	Bryan Ferry - vocals, keyboards; Andy Mackay - oboe, saxophone; Phil Manzanera - guitar; Paul Thompson - drums; with: Gary Tibbs – bass; Paul Carrack – keyboards; Neil Hubbard – guitar	none
May – November 1980 (First half of Flesh and Blood tour)	Bryan Ferry - vocals, keyboards; Andy Mackay - oboe, saxophone; Phil Manzanera - guitar; with: Gary Tibbs – bass; Paul Carrack – keyboards; Neil Hubbard – guitar; Andy Newmark – drums	none
December 1980 – February 1981 (Second half of Flesh and Blood tour, "Jealous Guy" single)	Bryan Ferry - vocals, keyboards; Andy Mackay - oboe, saxophone; Phil Manzanera - guitar; with: Gary Tibbs – bass; Neil Hubbard – guitar; Dave Skinner – keyboards; Michael Dawe – drums	"Jealous Guy" (1981)
Late 1981 – early 1982 (Avalon album)	Bryan Ferry - vocals, keyboards; Andy Mackay - oboe, saxophone; Phil Manzanera - guitar; with: Neil Hubbard – guitar; Alan Spenner – bass; Andy Newmark – drums; Neil Jason – bass; Jimmy Maelen – percussion; Fonzi Thornton – backing vocals; Yanick Étienne – backing vocals	Avalon (1982)
August 1982 – May 1983 (Avalon tour)	Bryan Ferry - vocals, keyboards; Andy Mackay - oboe, saxophone; Phil Manzanera - guitar; with: Neil Hubbard – guitar; Alan Spenner – bass; Andy Newmark – drums; Jimmy Maelen – percussion; Fonzi Thornton – backing vocals; Tawatha Agee – backing vocals; Michelle Cobb – backing vocals; Guy Fletcher – keyboards	The High Road (1983); Heart Still Beating (1990)
Band inactive June 1983 – January 2001
February – October 2001 (2001 tour)	Bryan Ferry – vocals, keyboards; Andy Mackay – oboe, saxophone; Phil Manzanera – guitar; Paul Thompson – drums; with: Colin Good – piano; Chris Spedding – guitar; Julia Thornton – percussion, keyboards; Michelle John – backing vocals; Sharon White – backing vocals; Sarah Brown – backing vocals; Zev Katz – bass; Lucy Wilkins – violin, keyboards	Roxy Music Live (2003)
July – October 2003 (2003 tour)	Bryan Ferry – vocals, keyboards; Andy Mackay – oboe, saxophone; Phil Manzanera – guitar; Paul Thompson – drums; with: Colin Good – piano; Chris Spedding – guitar; Julia Thornton – percussion, keyboards; Michelle John – backing vocals; Sharon White – backing vocals; Louise Peacock – violin, keyboards; Mark Smith – bass	none
June – August 2005 (2005 tour)	Bryan Ferry – vocals, keyboards; Andy Mackay – oboe, saxophone; Phil Manzanera – guitar; Paul Thompson – drums; with: Colin Good – piano; Chris Spedding – guitar; Julia Thornton – percussion, keyboards; Louise Peacock – violin, keyboards; Sarah Brown – backing vocals; Me'sha Bryan – backing vocals; Guy Pratt – bass	none
July 2006 (2006 tour)	Bryan Ferry – vocals, keyboards; Andy Mackay – oboe, saxophone; Phil Manzanera – guitar; with: Me'sha Bryan – backing vocals; Guy Pratt – bass; Andy Newmark – drums; Leo Abrahams – guitar; Joy Malcolm – backing vocals; Louise Clare Marshall – backing vocals, keyboards; Oliver Thompson – guitar	none
June – September 2010 (2010 tour)	Bryan Ferry – vocals, keyboards; Andy Mackay – oboe, saxophone; Phil Manzanera – guitar; Paul Thompson – drums; with: Oliver Thompson – guitar; Colin Good – piano; Sewuese Abwa – backing vocals; Hannah Kemoh – backing vocals; Aleysha Lei – backing vocals; Jerry Meehan – bass; Anna Phoebe – violin	none
January – March 2011 (2011 tour)	Bryan Ferry – vocals, keyboards; Andy Mackay – oboe, saxophone; Phil Manzanera – guitar; Paul Thompson – drums; with: Oliver Thompson – guitar; Colin Good – piano; Sewuese Abwa – backing vocals; Hannah Kemoh – backing vocals; Aleysha Lei – backing vocals; Jerry Meehan – bass; Jorja Chalmers – keyboards, saxophone; Tara Ferry – percussion	none
Band inactive April 2011 – March 2019
April 2019 (Rock and Roll Hall of Fame induction: inducted members in bold)	**Bryan Ferry** - vocals, keyboards; **Andy Mackay** - oboe, saxophone; **Phil Manzanera** - guitar; **Eddie Jobson** - synthesizer, keyboards, violin; with: Jorja Chalmers – keyboards, saxophone; Neil Jason – bass; Fonzi Thornton – backing vocals; Tawatha Agee – backing vocals; Chris Spedding - guitar; Luke Bullen – drums; Note: **Paul Thompson**, **Brian Eno** and **Graham Simpson** were also inducted. Simpson died in 2012, while Thompson and Eno were unable to attend.	none
Band inactive May 2019 – August 2022
September 2022 (First half of 2022 tour)	Bryan Ferry - vocals, keyboards; Andy Mackay - oboe, saxophone; Phil Manzanera - guitar; Paul Thompson - drums; with: Jorja Chalmers – keyboards, saxophone; Neil Jason – bass; Fonzi Thornton – backing vocals; Senab Adekunle – backing vocals; Phebe Edwards – backing vocals; Chloe Beth Smith – keyboards; Tom Vanstiphout – guitar; Christian Gulino – keyboards	none
October 2022 (Second half of 2022 tour)	Bryan Ferry - vocals, keyboards; Andy Mackay - oboe, saxophone; Phil Manzanera - guitar; Paul Thompson - drums; with: Jorja Chalmers – keyboards, saxophone; Neil Jason – bass; Fonzi Thornton – backing vocals; Paul Thompson - drums; Senab Adekunle – backing vocals; Phebe Edwards – backing vocals; Chloe Beth Smith – keyboards; Tom Vanstiphout – guitar; Richard Cardwell – keyboards	none
