= Greatest Hits (Roxy Music album) =

Roxy Music Greatest Hits

Greatest hits album by Roxy Music
- Released: November 1977
- Recorded: 1972–1975
- Genres: Art rock; glam rock
- Length: 45:18
- Label: Atco
- Producers: Roxy Music; Chris Thomas; John Punter; Peter Sinfield; John Anthony

Roxy Music chronology
| Viva! (1976) | Roxy Music Greatest Hits (1977) | Manifesto (1979) |

Singles from Roxy Music Greatest Hits
- 1. "Virginia Plain" Released: 7 October 1977; 2. "Do the Strand" Released: 20 January 1978

Professional ratings
Review scores
| Source | Rating |
|---|---|
| AllMusic | 4/5 stars |
| Christgau's Record Guide | A |
| The New Rolling Stone Album Guide | 5/5 stars |

Greatest Hits is a compilation album by the English band Roxy Music. It was released in November 1977, when the band were on hiatus.

The band's first hit, "Virginia Plain", was re-released ahead of the album, peaking at number 11 in the UK (the original 1972 release had peaked at number 4). The edited version of "The Thrill of It All" is unique to this release, while the released single version (3:20) is available the 2012 boxed set Roxy Music: The Complete Studio Recordings. "Mother of Pearl" is an edit in that it does not crossfade into the next song, as it does on the 1973 album Stranded. The version of "Pyjamarama" on this collection is a remix of the original 1973 single which is also available on The Complete Studio Recordings, as well as the 1977 Polydor reissue of the "Virginia Plain" single.

== Track listing ==
All songs written by Bryan Ferry except as noted.

Side one
| No. | Title | Notes | Length |
|---|---|---|---|
| 1. | "Virginia Plain" | from "Virginia Plain" A-side single, 1972 | 2:55 |
| 2. | "Do the Strand" | from For Your Pleasure, 1973 | 4:00 |
| 3. | "All I Want Is You" | from Country Life, 1974 | 2:53 |
| 4. | "Out of the Blue" (Ferry, Phil Manzanera) | from Country Life, 1974 | 4:42 |
| 5. | "Pyjamarama" | Remix of "Pyjamarama" A-side single, 1973 | 2:50 |
| 6. | "Editions of You" | from For Your Pleasure, 1973 | 3:45 |

Side two
| No. | Title | Notes | Length |
|---|---|---|---|
| 1. | "Love Is the Drug" (Ferry, Andy Mackay) | from Siren, 1975 | 4:05 |
| 2. | "Mother of Pearl" (edit) | from Stranded, 1973 | 6:45 |
| 3. | "A Song for Europe" (Ferry, Mackay) | from Stranded, 1973 | 5:45 |
| 4. | "The Thrill of It All" (edit) | from Country Life, 1974 | 4:20 |
| 5. | "Street Life" | from Stranded, 1973 | 3:21 |

== Personnel ==
- Bryan Ferry – vocals, keyboards, guitar
- Andy Mackay – oboe, saxophone
- Phil Manzanera – electric guitar
- Paul Thompson – drums, percussion
- Brian Eno – keyboards (tracks 1–2 and 5–6 on side one)
- Rik Kenton – bass (track 1 on side one)
- John Porter – bass (tracks 2 and 5–6 on side one)
- Eddie Jobson – keyboards, violin (tracks 3–4 on side one, all tracks on side two)
- John Gustafson – bass (tracks 3–4 on side one, all tracks except 5 on side two)
- Chris Thomas – bass (track 5 on side two)

== Charts ==
Chart performance for Greatest Hits
| Chart (1977–1978) | Peak position |
|---|---|
| UK Albums (Official Charts) | 20 |

== Certifications ==
| Region | Certification | Certified units/sales |
|---|---|---|
| United Kingdom (BPI) | Gold | 100,000^{^} |
^{^} Shipments figures based on certification alone.
