= Viva! (Roxy Music album) =

Viva! Roxy Music

Live album by Roxy Music
- Released: 16 July 1976
- Recorded: November 1973, October 1974 and October 1975
- Venues: Glasgow Apollo, Newcastle City Hall, Wembley Empire Hall
- Genres: Art rock; glam rock
- Length: 46:15
- Label: Island
- Producer: Chris Thomas

Roxy Music chronology
Siren (1975)	Viva! Roxy Music (1976)	Roxy Music Greatest Hits (1977)

Professional ratings
Review scores
Source	Rating
AllMusic	3.5/5 stars
Christgau's Record Guide	B
Rolling Stone	2/5 stars

Viva! Roxy Music was the first live Roxy Music album. It was released in July 1976 and was recorded at three venues in the United Kingdom between 1973 and 1975. The recordings were from the band's shows at the Glasgow Apollo in November 1973, Newcastle City Hall in October 1974 and the Wembley Empire Pool in October 1975.

== Track listing ==
All songs written by Bryan Ferry except "Out of the Blue" by Ferry and Phil Manzanera.

Side one
No.	Title	Original release	Length
1.	"Out of the Blue" (Newcastle City Hall, 27 or 28 October 1974)	Country Life (1974)	4:44
2.	"Pyjamarama" (Glasgow Apollo, 2 November 1973)	Non-album single (March 1973)	3:36
3.	"The Bogus Man" (Newcastle City Hall, 27 or 28 October 1974)	For Your Pleasure (1973)	7:05
4.	"Chance Meeting" (Glasgow Apollo, 2 November 1973)	Roxy Music (1972)	2:58
5.	"Both Ends Burning" (Wembley Empire Pool, 17 or 18 October 1975)	Siren (1975)	4:46

Side two
No.	Title	Original release	Length
1.	"If There Is Something" (Newcastle City Hall, 27 or 28 October 1974)	Roxy Music (1972)	10:37
2.	"In Every Dream Home a Heartache" (Newcastle City Hall, 27 or 28 October 1974)	For Your Pleasure (1973)	8:23
3.	"Do the Strand" (Newcastle City Hall, 27 or 28 October 1974)	For Your Pleasure (1973)	4:00

== Personnel ==
Roxy Music

- Bryan Ferry – vocals, keyboard
- Andy Mackay – saxophone, oboe
- Phil Manzanera – guitar
- Paul Thompson – drums
- Eddie Jobson – electric violin, synthesizer, keyboards

Additional personnel

- John Wetton – bass (except on "Pyjamarama", "Chance Meeting" and "Both Ends Burning")
- John Gustafson – bass (on "Both Ends Burning")
- Sal Maida – bass (on "Pyjamarama" and "Chance Meeting")
- Rick Wills – bass (possible but unconfirmed studio overdubs; Wills is credited on the album despite none of the recordings coming from his time with the band)
- The Sirens (Doreen Chanter and Jacqui Sullivan) – backing vocals (on "Both Ends Burning")

== Charts ==
Chart (1976)	Peak position
Australian Albums (Kent Music Report)	15
Canada Top Albums/CDs (RPM)	94
Dutch Albums (Album Top 100)	2
German Albums (Offizielle Top 100)	48
New Zealand Albums (RMNZ)	20
Norwegian Albums (VG-lista)	10
Swedish Albums (Sverigetopplistan)	9
UK Albums (Official Charts)	6
US Billboard 200	81

== Certifications ==
Region	Certification	Certified units/sales
United Kingdom (BPI)	Silver	60,000^{^}
^{^} Shipments figures based on certification alone.
