= Manifesto (Roxy Music album) =

Studio album by Roxy Music
- Released: 16 March 1979
- Recorded: 1978–1979
- Studios: Ridge Farm (Rusper, England); Basing Street (London)
- Genres: Pop rock; art rock
- Length: 43:10
- Labels: E.G.; Polydor; Atco
- Producer: Roxy Music

Roxy Music chronology
Roxy Music Greatest Hits (1977)	Manifesto (1979)	Flesh + Blood (1980)

Singles from Manifesto
- 1. "Trash" Released: 23 February 1979; 2. "Dance Away" Released: 12 April 1979; 3. "Angel Eyes" Released: 3 August 1979

Manifesto is the sixth studio album by the English rock band Roxy Music. It was released in March 1979 by E.G. in the United Kingdom, Polydor in Europe and Atco in the United States.

Following an almost four-year recording hiatus, Manifesto was Roxy Music's first studio album since 1975's Siren. The first single from Manifesto was "Trash", which peaked at number 40 on the UK Singles Chart. The second single, the disco-tinged "Dance Away", was more successful, peaking at number two in the UK on 26 May 1979, beaten to the top spot for three weeks by Blondie's "Sunday Girl". It became one of the band's biggest hits, and was also the ninth best-selling single in the UK in 1979. The song was also released as a 12" extended version (running at six and half minutes), a format that had started to become popular in the late 1970s. The third single from the album was a re-recorded version of "Angel Eyes", which was far more electronic and "disco" in nature than the power-pop album version. An extended 12" mix was also released. The single also made the UK top five, peaking at number four in August. The album itself peaked at number seven on the UK Albums Chart. In the United States, the album peaked at number 23 on the Billboard 200, making it Roxy Music's highest-charting album in the US.

The cover design which featured a variety of mannequins (a concept also used for the covers of the singles from the album), was created by Bryan Ferry with fashion designer Antony Price and American TV actress Hilary Thompson amongst others. The picture disc version of the album featured a version of the design in which the mannequins are unclothed. The cover's typography, as well as the album's title, were inspired by the first edition of Wyndham Lewis's literary magazine Blast.

== Release history ==
On the original vinyl release, side one was labelled "East Side" and side two was labelled "West Side".

After the song became a hit, the second pressings of the album substituted the original version of "Dance Away" with its single remix. Later on, the LP version of "Angel Eyes" was also replaced by the more popular re-recorded version released as a single. The original CD versions of the album used the revised track list, until the LP version of "Angel Eyes" was restored in the 1999 remaster. Manifesto was finally released on CD in its original version on The Complete Studio Recordings box in 2012. The first LP version ‘Angel Eyes’ first appeared on the U.S. compilation CD “The Atlantic Collection” while the first LP version of “Dance Away” appeared on CD for the first time in 1995 on The Thrill of It All box set.

== Critical reception ==
Professional ratings
Review scores
Source	Rating
AllMusic	3/5 stars
Christgau's Record Guide	A−
MusicHound Rock: The Essential Album Guide	3/5 stars
Pitchfork	7.5/10
The Rolling Stone Album Guide	3.5/5 stars
Smash Hits	8/10
Spin Alternative Record Guide	7/10

Manifesto was positively received by critics but not as well regarded as previous Roxy Music albums. In his review for Melody Maker, Richard Williams stated:

Manifesto is a worthwhile attempt to make both form and content match its own internal preoccupations. It speaks of Ferry's continuing personal dilemma (which, put coarsely, boils down to the eternal choice between leather or tweed, between women who dare and women who care), and it wishes to satisfy those who bought "Virginia Plain" while making genuflections to present-day American radio culture. Is it compromised by its emphasis on this double-schizophrenia? Certainly it pulls some punches. But, reservations aside, this may be the first such return bout ever attempted with any degree of genuine success: a technical knockout against the odds.

Max Bell of NME gave it a lukewarm review:

Ultimately, I found it hard to work up much enthusiasm for Manifesto and a replay of "Would You Believe" and "Sea Breezes" indicates why. In many ways the band have come full circle without evolving anything dramatically new – at least – not according to those initial standards ... Perhaps greater familiarity with Manifesto will reveal hidden magic. At present it merely comes across over like an assured modern dip into friendly territory – an entertaining, pleasant album.

Similarly, Village Voice critic Robert Christgau wrote:

This isn't Roxy at its most innovative, just its most listenable – the entire 'West Side' sustains the relaxed, pleasantly funky groove it intends, and the difficulties of the 'East Side' are hardly prohibitive. At last Ferry's vision seems firsthand even in its distancing – he's paid enough dues to deserve to keep his distance. And the title track is well-named, apparent contradictions and all.

Greil Marcus wrote in Rolling Stone:

So the record has its moments – moments few bands even know about – but as with the brazenly (and meaninglessly) titled "Manifesto," they add up to little. Ferry announces he's for the guy "who'd rather die than be tied down"; he's rarely traded on such banality, and he mouths the lyrics as if he hopes no one will hear them. The sound may be alive, but the story is almost silent. It's not that Ferry has given it up. He began making solo albums long before Roxy called it a day – starting with his outrageous collection of oldies covers, These Foolish Things, and continuing through last year's astonishing The Bride Stripped Bare – and on those LPs, the tale of a man struggling to find himself behind his mask, and a lover behind hers, goes on. It's a tale couched in melodrama but driven by terror and compassion: what it has is the intensity Manifesto never reaches for.

Ken Emerson, of The New York Times, noted:

Ferry has never before sung so warmly, and the sprightly choruses and creamy vocal harmonies of several numbers may make them hits if listeners aren't disconcerted by the weirdness that lurks around the music's edges.

It was ranked 30th in The Village Voice's Pazz & Jop critics' poll of the best albums of 1979. The 1992 Rolling Stone Album Guide gave the album four stars, writing that "the regrouped Roxy seems better for the rest: deftly blending fresh rhythms into its signature sound, shortening the musical passages and concentrating more on song craft."

== Track listing ==
All tracks are written by Bryan Ferry, except where noted.

Side one – "East Side"
No.	Title	Writer(s)	Length
1.	"Manifesto"	Ferry, Phil Manzanera	5:29
2.	"Trash"	Ferry, Manzanera	2:14
3.	"Angel Eyes"	Ferry, Andy Mackay	3:32
4.	"Still Falls the Rain"	Ferry, Manzanera	4:13
5.	"Stronger Through the Years"		6:16

Side two – "West Side"
No.	Title	Writer(s)	Length
1.	"Ain't That So"		5:39
2.	"My Little Girl"	Ferry, Manzanera	3:17
3.	"Dance Away"		4:20
4.	"Cry, Cry, Cry"		2:55
5.	"Spin Me Round"		5:15
Total length:			43:10

== Personnel ==
Roxy Music

- Bryan Ferry – vocals, keyboards, harmonica
- Andy Mackay – oboe, saxophone
- Phil Manzanera – guitar
- Paul Thompson – drums

Additional personnel

- Alan Spenner – bass
- Gary Tibbs – bass
- Paul Carrack – keyboards, backing vocals
- Richard Tee – piano
- Steve Ferrone – drums, percussion
- Rick Marotta – drums
- Melissa Manchester – backing vocals
- Luther Vandross – backing vocals

Technical personnel

- Rhett Davies – recording engineer
- Jimmy Douglass – engineer
- Phill Brown – engineer
- Randy Mason – engineer

== Charts ==
=== Weekly charts ===
Chart (1979)	Peak position
Australian Albums (Kent Music Report)	13
Austrian Albums (Ö3 Austria)	25
Canada Top Albums/CDs (RPM)	24
Dutch Albums (Album Top 100)	5
German Albums (Offizielle Top 100)	37
New Zealand Albums (RMNZ)	8
Swedish Albums (Sverigetopplistan)	11
UK Albums (Official Charts)	7
US Billboard 200	23

=== Year-end charts ===
Chart (1979)	Position
New Zealand Albums (RMNZ)	28

== Certifications ==
Region	Certification	Certified units/sales
Netherlands (NVPI)	Gold	50,000^{^}
New Zealand (RMNZ)	Gold	7,500^{^}
United Kingdom (BPI)	Gold	100,000^{^}
^{^} Shipments figures based on certification alone.
