= Both Ends Burning =

Single by Roxy Music

from the album Siren
- B-side: "For Your Pleasure (Live)"
- Released: 19 December 1975
- Recorded: June–September 1975, AIR Studios, London
- Genre: Pop; rock; disco; funk
- Length: 3:58 (Single version); 5:12 (Album version)
- Label: Island, Polydor
- Songwriter: Bryan Ferry
- Producer: Chris Thomas

Roxy Music singles chronology
"Love Is the Drug" (1975)	"Both Ends Burning" (1975)	"Trash" (1979)

"Both Ends Burning" is a single by English rock band Roxy Music taken from their 1975 album Siren. Written by Bryan Ferry, the song features lyrics inspired by the pressure felt by the band to complete the Siren album as well as keep up their touring obligations. Ferry's struggles in writing the lyrics for the song meant that the band largely had to complete the instrumental track without his vocal line.

"Both Ends Burning" was released as the follow-up single in the UK and Europe to the band's colossally successful previous single, "Love Is the Drug". Reaching number 25 in the UK, the song has since seen acclaim from music writers for its use of synthesizers and has become a live favorite for the band.

== Background ==
"Both Ends Burning" was one of the final songs completed for Siren, in large part because vocalist Bryan Ferry was struggling to complete lyrics for the album. As a result, the band largely had to arrange the song before Ferry recorded his vocals. Saxophonist Andy Mackay remembered, "Toward the end of recording, we were compromised as we had been on Stranded and other albums by Bryan not having finished lyrics so that tracks got overworked as instrumentals while we were working as it were in the dark. 'Both Ends Burning' is a case in point. It has always been better live because we know where the singing comes in!"

Lyrically, "Both Ends Burning" was inspired by the stress that the band was experiencing during the recording sessions for Siren. Ferry recalled, "We were on a punishing world tour schedule in 1975 and there were a lot of late nights to get the Siren album finished on time. I guess this was the inspiration behind this song."

== Release ==
"Both Ends Burning" was released as the follow-up single to the band's smash hit "Love Is the Drug" in the UK and Europe. Released in December 1975, the single crept to number 25. It was also released as the B-side to "Love Is the Drug" in the US and Canada. Since then, it has become a fan favorite and has appeared regularly in the band's live setlists.

The version released as a single edited the intro and the ending compared to the album version. The B-side of the single was a version of their song "For Your Pleasure" recorded live at the Empire Pool Wembley in October 1975, at one of the concerts from which the Viva! album was composed. The single version is on The Complete Studio Recordings 1972–1982 but was not included on their 1977 album Greatest Hits.

== Critical reception and legacy ==
"Both Ends Burning" has seen critical acclaim since its release. The Quietus called the track "sweeping and feverish," while Vulture has praised the song as "defin[ing] the mature use of synthesizers during this time." Paul Sexton of uDiscoverMusic wrote, called it "a less celebrated Ferry composition [than 'Love Is the Drug'] but was cutting-edge in its own way, with synthesizer detail by Eddie Jobson, Mackay's ever-urgent saxophones and Ferry’s impassioned lead." Dave Thompson of AllMusic called it "one of Roxy mach one's most unexpected triumphs" as well as "the undisputed highlight of the otherwise sorry Siren album – 'Love Is the Drug' notwithstanding."

Johnny Marr of the Smiths spoke glowingly of the song for its fusing of pop and the avant garde, stating, "You listen to 'Both Ends Burning,' that was a pop single! And the attitude of the singer and what he is saying, and the way he is putting his voice across, and just the start of it... That is the best kind of avant-garde, I think."

== Charts ==
Chart (1975–1976)	Peak position
UK Singles (OCC)	25

== Personnel ==
- Bryan Ferry – vocals, keyboards
- John Gustafson – bass
- Edwin Jobson – strings, synthesiser, keyboards
- Andrew Mackay – oboe, saxophone
- Phil Manzanera – guitar
- Paul Thompson – drums
