= Country Life (Roxy Music album) =

Studio album by Roxy Music
- Released: 15 November 1974
- Recorded: July – August 1974
- Studio: AIR (London)
- Genre: Art rock
- Length: 41:25
- Labels: Island; Atco
- Producers: John Punter; Roxy Music

Roxy Music chronology
| Stranded (1973) | Country Life (1974) | Siren (1975) |

Singles from Country Life
- 1. "All I Want Is You" Released: October 1974 (UK); 2. "The Thrill of It All" Released: November 1974 (US)

Country Life is the fourth studio album by the English art rock band Roxy Music, released on 15 November 1974 by Island Records. It was released by Atco Records in the United States. Many critics consider the album to be among the band's most sophisticated and consistent.

Country Life peaked at number three on the UK albums chart. It also charted at number 37 in the US, becoming their first record to crack the top 40 in the country. The album includes Roxy Music's fourth hit single, "All I Want Is You", which, backed with the B-side "Your Application's Failed", reached number 12 on the UK singles chart. An edited version of "The Thrill of It All", with the same B-side, was released in the US.

== Style and themes ==
Band leader Bryan Ferry took the album's title from the British rural lifestyle magazine Country Life.

The opening track, "The Thrill of It All", is an uptempo rocker that builds on the style of previous Roxy Music songs such as "Virginia Plain" (1972) and "Do the Strand" (1973); it includes a quote from Dorothy Parker's poem "Resume": "You might as well live". Eddie Jobson's violin dominates the heavily flanged production of "Out of the Blue", which became a live favourite. Esoteric musical influences are betrayed by the German oom-pah band passages in "Bitter-Sweet", the Elizabethan flavour of "Triptych" and the lighthearted, boogie-blues, Southern rock edge to "If It Takes All Night".

"Three and Nine" has been likened to the whimsical songs of the Kinks' Ray Davies, with Ferry looking back nostalgically to a time of watching the moving pictures in cinemas in his youth, for the pre-decimalization price of 3 shillings and ninepence.

"Casanova" was singled out for praise by a number of critics as a more cynical and hard-rocking number than the usual Roxy Music fare. Like the earlier "In Every Dream Home a Heartache" (1973), it was seen as a critique of the hollowness of the contemporary jet set, and contained further instances of Ferry's idiosyncratic word association ("Now you're nothing but / Second hand in glove / With second rate"). A re-recorded version, more mellow than the original, appeared on Ferry's 1976 solo studio album Let's Stick Together.

The final track, "Prairie Rose", is an ode to Texas and sometimes mistakenly thought as a reference to Jerry Hall. However, Ferry did not meet Hall until 1975.

== Cover art ==
Shot by Eric Boman, the Country Life cover features two scantily clad models, Constanze Karoli (sister of Can's Michael Karoli) and Eveline Grunwald (who was also Michael Karoli's girlfriend). Bryan Ferry met them in Portugal and persuaded them to do the photo shoot as well as to help him with the words to the song "Bitter-Sweet". Although not credited for appearing on the cover, they are credited on the lyric sheet for their German translation work.

The cover image was controversial in some countries, including the United States and Spain, where it was censored for release. As a result, early releases in the US were packaged in opaque shrink wrap; a later American LP release of Country Life (available during the years 1975–80) featured a different cover shot. Instead of Karoli and Grunwald posed in front of some trees, the reissue used a photo from the album's back cover that featured only the trees. In Australia, the album was banned in some record stores, while others sold each copy inside a black plastic sleeve. Author Michael Ochs has described the result as the "most complete cover-up in rock history".

== Critical reception ==
Professional ratings
Review scores
| Source | Rating |
|---|---|
| AllMusic | 5/5 stars |
| Overdose | A |
| Pitchfork | 9.4/10 |
| Q | 4/5 stars |
| The Rolling Stone Album Guide | 5/5 stars |
| Spin Alternative Record Guide | 9/10 |
| The Village Voice | B+ |

Jim Miller, in a 1975 review for Rolling Stone, wrote that "Stranded and Country Life together mark the zenith of contemporary British art rock."

In 2003, Country Life was ranked number 387 on Rolling Stone's list of The 500 Greatest Albums of All Time. It was one of four Roxy Music studio albums that made the list (For Your Pleasure, Siren and Avalon being the others).

== Track listing ==
All tracks are written by Bryan Ferry, except where noted.

Side one
| No. | Title | Writer(s) | Length |
|---|---|---|---|
| 1. | "The Thrill of It All" | | 6:23 |
| 2. | "Three and Nine" | Ferry; Andy Mackay | 4:01 |
| 3. | "All I Want Is You" | | 2:56 |
| 4. | "Out of the Blue" | Ferry; Phil Manzanera | 4:46 |
| 5. | "If It Takes All Night" | | 3:09 |

Side two
| No. | Title | Writer(s) | Length |
|---|---|---|---|
| 1. | "Bitter-Sweet" | Ferry; Mackay | 4:51 |
| 2. | "Triptych" | | 3:09 |
| 3. | "Casanova" | | 3:23 |
| 4. | "A Really Good Time" | | 3:44 |
| 5. | "Prairie Rose" | Ferry; Manzanera | 5:13 |
| Total length: | | | 41:25 |

Note: "Out of the Blue" was listed incorrectly as being 4:26 on original pressings.

== Personnel ==
Roxy Music

- Bryan Ferry – vocals, keyboards, harmonica
- Andy Mackay (credited as 'Andrew Mackay') – oboe, saxophone
- Phil Manzanera – guitar
- Paul Thompson – drums
- Eddie Jobson (credited as 'Edwin Jobson') – strings, synthesizer, keyboards

Additional musicians

- John Gustafson – bass guitar

Note: On the 1999 CD reissue of Country Life, Manzanera and Thompson's respective credits are erroneously reversed.

== Charts ==
| Chart (1974–1975) | Peak position |
|---|---|
| Australian Albums (Kent Music Report) | 26 |
| Austrian Albums (Ö3 Austria) | 10 |
| Canada Top Albums/CDs (RPM) | 47 |
| German Albums (Offizielle Top 100) | 38 |
| New Zealand Albums (RMNZ) | 8 |
| Norwegian Albums (VG-lista) | 15 |
| UK Albums (Official Charts) | 3 |
| US Billboard 200 | 37 |

| Chart (2022) | Peak position |
|---|---|
| Scottish Albums (Official Charts) | 72 |

== Certifications ==
| Region | Certification | Certified units/sales |
|---|---|---|
| United Kingdom (BPI) | Gold | 100,000^{^} |
^{^} Shipments figures based on certification alone.

== Bibliography ==
- Rex Balfour (1976). The Bryan Ferry Story
- David Buckley (2004). The Thrill of it All: The Story of Bryan Ferry and Roxy Music
- Todd Burns (2004). Stylus Magazine: "Under the Covers"
