= For Your Pleasure =

Studio album by Roxy Music
- Released: 23 March 1973
- Recorded: February 1973
- Studio: AIR (London)
- Genres: Art rock; glam rock
- Length: 42:24
- Labels: Island; Warner Bros.
- Producers: Chris Thomas; John Anthony; Roxy Music

Roxy Music chronology
Roxy Music (1972)	For Your Pleasure (1973)	Stranded (1973)

Singles from For Your Pleasure
- 1. "Do the Strand" Released: July 1973

For Your Pleasure is the second studio album by the English rock band Roxy Music, released on 23 March 1973 by Island Records. It was their last to feature synthesiser player Brian Eno. The album expanded on the experimental nature of their self-titled debut, featuring a more elaborate production and experimentation.

The album was commercially more successful than their debut, peaking at number four in the UK Album Charts and eventually attaining certified gold status from the British Phonographic Industry. It also yielded one single, "Do the Strand", released outside of the UK in July 1973. The album received positive reviews from critics, who place it as Roxy Music's best album and regard it as one of the greatest glam rock albums of all time.

== Background ==
Bryan Ferry studied under pop art painter and theorist Richard Hamilton at Newcastle University. Hamilton saw a painting as a mood board, pinning his inspirations and goals "that could as easily clash as blend together", which were adapted by Ferry on For Your Pleasure, thematically taking him from the past and into his representation of the future. Hamilton's work Just what is it that makes today's homes so different, so appealing? got its mark on "In Every Dream Home a Heartache", a song about illusions of modern sophistication and the horrors behind them.

In the wake of the For Your Pleasure sessions, Roxy Music sharpened their technique while touring their debut album. They lost some of the "freewheeling wildness", and in return gained a more concentrated, hearty and less experimental sound, which were the qualities that Ferry most yearned for. Ferry wrote the better part of the album within a two-week writing spree in early 1973, while "Grey Lagoons" and "For Your Pleasure" had already been conceived during the 1971 recording sessions, stockpiled for their debut album, and later developed for the release of their second album. In a way, Ferry was focused on writing a follow-up to the band's debut.

== Production ==
Roxy Music recorded For Your Pleasure in February 1973, at London's AIR Studios in Oxford Circus. Bassist Rik Kenton left the band shortly before the sessions. John Porter agreed to play bass temporarily, working on the album and the subsequent tour, but turned down an offer to join permanently. On the album gatefold, he is credited as a "guest artiste". At first, the band wanted to be the sole producers, but the label convinced them otherwise. Ultimately, Roxy Music produced the album themselves with the aid of Chris Thomas, while John Middleton and John Punter worked on the audio engineering side. Thomas recalled that, following the release of their debut, Roxy Music asked John Cale to produce them, letting him choose the recording studio, and Cale chose AIR Studios. However, the project with Cale did not come to fruition, and instead Ferry asked Thomas, whom Ferry met while visiting AIR Studios, to help with production.

The group spent more studio time on this album than on their debut, combining song material by Ferry with more elaborate production treatments. For example, the song "In Every Dream Home a Heartache" (Ferry's sinister ode to a blow-up doll) fades out in its closing section, only to fade in again with all the instruments subjected to a pronounced phasing treatment. The title track fades out in an elaborate blend of tape loop effects.

Thomas, commenting on the recording of "In Every Dream Home a Heartache", said that the band had not known the song's lyrics when they put the instrumental parts on tape. It was performed as a soundtrack, backing track for the future lyrics, and Ferry asked them to record a psychedelic epilogue. Just before the album's release, Ferry told Melody Maker that, initially, some of the lyrics were twice as long and focused more on reciting ideas than forming a cohesive song, so he had to cut them in half.

=== Artwork ===
For Your Pleasure full record sleeve

The cover photo was taken by Karl Stoecker. It features Bryan Ferry's girlfriend at the time, the model Amanda Lear, who was also the confidante, protégée, and close friend of the surrealist artist Salvador Dalí. Lear was depicted posing in a skintight leather dress leading a black panther on a leash. The full record sleeve art features a limousine parked on the left side from Lear, with a waiting Ferry acting as a chauffeur.

The cover art is ranked by Rolling Stone and Billboard among the "100 Best Album Covers of All Time". Rob Tannenbaum's Pitchfork put the feeling captured by the sleeve art as an alluring, modern image of appeal, danger, sexual gratification, and luxury lifestyle. Similar to other rock bands, the cover promises "adolescents a misleading fantasy of what adult life is like". Brian Eno disliked the choice for the album's cover art, feeling it was too stereotyped and pretentious.

== Music and lyrics ==
For Your Pleasure has been categorised by critics as an art rock and glam rock record, additionally featuring American R&B and European avant-garde music.

Music biographer David Buckley believed that "Do the Strand" was the song Roxy Music performed most frequently in concert. The song "Beauty Queen" was composed primarily by Ferry, drawing inspiration from the "anxious, feminine side of R&B". He sings about parting ways with a woman gifted with "swimming pool eyes", but his vocal delivery conveys a tone of a marriage proposal. Ferry promises she will be fine without him, carefully catering her with purple prose and using his theatrical and campy baritone, the tone which often, paradoxically, implies Ferry's sincerity. Ferry said at the time that the song has a definite "northern working men's club feel to it". The lyrics of "Editions of You" reflect on the experience of longing for someone who is no longer present. The song features saxophone parts reminiscent of 1950s R&B and a tonally impressive synthesiser solo with frequency control tweaked in a way to create, what Eno later favourably dubbed, "quite unpalatable noises".

"The Bogus Man", an eerie song about a sexual stalker, is played around a metronome drum rhythm that builds up into a long, minimalist beat with the song's instruments mutating within "some mysterious cycle". Andy Mackay played an atonal saxophone, intentionally stopping himself from performing in key. He believed the song's drum beat was inspired by reggae rhythms, while Pitchfork recognised its rhythms as blueprints for the trance music years before its conception. Eno liked its repetition saying "repetition is a form of change", and remarked that the song displayed similarities with contemporary material by the krautrock group Can, seen by Eno as "open-ended, improvisatory, and not just thoroughly-rehearsed". Additionally, Eno loved the song's duality, creating an ominous feeling, but touched by a relatively happy-sounding riff. He claimed it was "probably the most successful track"; drummer Paul Thompson favoured the song, as well. Versions of it had been performed live before its official release on For Your Pleasure.

The final song "For Your Pleasure" prominently features Eno, unlike any other song on the album. The song opens with minimalist piano playing in a stop-start rhythm and Ferry's lyricism conjuring "impossible gravitas". Towards the end the song builds a sense of "panoramic disorientation" — multilayered sounds blurred together into one wave of piano echo, imbued with guitar reverb, phasing, and tremolo; then "it gently becomes hazy and puzzling". The band uses the studio as an instrument, advancing the song by manipulating a mixing board. The song inches towards an epilogue with the repeated samples of "Well, how are you?" taken from "Chance Meeting", a song recorded for the first Roxy Music album, and "For Your Pleasure" ends with the voice of Judi Dench saying: "You don't ask. You don't ask why".

== Release and promotion ==
For Your Pleasure was originally released by Island Records in the United Kingdom and Warner Bros. Records in the United States. Original pressings of the album featured a gatefold-sleeve picture of the five band members posing with guitars. It has been subsequently reissued by Polydor Records in the UK, and by ATCO Records and Reprise Records in the US.

"Do the Strand", backed with "Editions of You", was released as a single in the US and Europe in 1973; it was finally issued as a UK single in 1978 to promote Roxy Music's Greatest Hits album, released in December the previous year. The non-album single "Pyjamarama", backed with "The Pride and the Pain", was issued in advance of the album in UK, peaking at number ten on the UK Singles Chart.

To promote the album, Roxy Music toured UK and Europe in 1973 with Porter continuing his engagement with the band. They were supported by the Sharks and Lloyd Watson on the UK dates. The band "toned down slightly" on the costumes from the extremes of 1972. The tour included "Do the Strand" and "Editions of You", in addition to their older material represented by "Pyjamarama", "Ladytron", "If There Is Something", "Re-Make/Re-Model", and "Virginia Plain". Tony Palmer of The Observer, who was not a fan of their album, applauded their presentation, calling it "demonic, sinister, apocalyptic, monstrous, dazzling, flashy". The contemporary music critics emphasised the band's general technique's improvements, highlighting the performances by drummer Paul Thompson and guitarist Phil Manzanera. They reportedly did not profit from either of the tours.

A concert version of "For Your Pleasure", recorded live at the Empire Pool Wembley in October 1975, was used as a B-side of the "Both Ends Burning" single. In February 2022, Roxy Music announced a series of reissue releases of their back catalogue, including For Your Pleasure. The albums were remastered in half-speed at Abbey Road Studios by engineer Miles Showell and released by Virgin Records.

== Critical reception ==
Professional ratings
Review scores
Source	Rating
AllMusic	5/5 stars
Christgau's Record Guide	B
Encyclopedia of Popular Music	4/5 stars
NME	9/10
Pitchfork	10/10 (2012); 9.5/10 (2019)
Q	4/5 stars
The Rolling Stone Album Guide	5/5 stars
Select	5/5
Spin Alternative Record Guide	6/10

=== Contemporary reviews ===
In 1973 For Your Pleasure reached number four the on UK Albums Chart, remaining at the chart for 27 weeks, while reaching number 193 in US Billboard 200. In the contemporary reviews, NME's Charles Shaar Murray described For Your Pleasure as a "staggeringly fine piece of work, easily outstripping the first album". Robert Christgau gave it a mixed review, saying the band have a "strange idea of a good time, but this [album] isn't decadent, it's ridiculous". Roy Hollingsworth of Melody Maker, "initially sceptical of the band, was completely charmed" by For Your Pleasure.

Paul Gambaccini of Rolling Stone expressed mixed feelings, calling the album "remarkably inaccessible" and deeming the better half of it to be "either above us, beneath us, or on another plane altogether". Gambaccini reserved praise for "Do the Strand", "In Every Dream Home a Heartache", and the saxophone solo on "Editions Of You". Music biographer David Buckley noted that contemporary negative reviews mostly saw the album as a "contrivance to cash in on glam rock" and regarded Roxy Music as musicians whose limited technique restricted them from realising their ideas.

Eno said at the time that their debut album got acclaim for its dilettantism, touching on a number of ideas, but not really taking them far enough. With For Your Pleasure, however, Eno felt that Roxy Music "got over that to an extent", showing fewer ideas but exploring them on a deeper level. In a later interview Eno described the album as "just slung together, not worked on like the first one," and lamented that the band did not maintain the "experimental stance" to the degree he wanted. Eno thought that "Grey Lagoons" was a "very trivial track", paying tribute to 1950s music, and was disappointed that the band did not release the initial version of "The Bogus Man", which he liked better. Nevertheless, he called "Beauty Queen" one of his favourite tracks by Roxy Music.

=== Retrospective reviews ===
In 2012 Pitchfork's Tom Ewing selected For Your Pleasure as the best album by Roxy Music, lauding the output that resulted from the "tension between two fast-diverging creativities" of Ferry and Eno. Stephen Thomas Erlewine of AllMusic sensed creative tensions between Ferry and Eno, identifying "The Bogus Man" as the song that captures those tensions perfectly. Moreover, Erlewine liked how the album demonstrates that "avant-garde ideas can flourish in a pop setting"; For Your Pleasure manages to balance between being experimental and the accessible, forming a nascent vocabulary for rock bands, and one that was exploited heavily in the ensuing decade".

In 2019 another Pitchfork reviewer, Rob Tannenbaum, described For Your Pleasure as "happily pretentious and self-involved", creating a middle ground between "glam" and "prog" with the "greatest degree of success". The prog side contributes its song lengths and solos-focused songwriting, while the glam part adds "exclamation marks and sex appeal". Tannenbaum did not notice a conflict between Ferry and Eno, simply seeing a band high on its early success and acclaim, experimenting space-ward while trying to stay close to the more conventional pop sound. He additionally highlighted the strong work from Thompson and Manzanera, who "grounded the music's outlandish shifts". Tannenbaum dubbed "Do the Strand" and "Editions of You" prototypes for the "ferocity of punk rock".

Simon Reynolds, writing for Uncut magazine, lauded the song "For Your Pleasure" for being unique in comparison to the rest of rock music, placing it among such works as Nico's Marble Index and Joy Division's "Atmosphere". NME called the album "the pinnacle of English art rock". Morrissey told the British press For Your Pleasure was the only "truly great British album". Ferry chose the album as his personal favourite, but lamented the fact that it marked his high point after just two years of involvement into the music industry.

=== Accolades ===
Both NME and Rolling Stone included For Your Pleasure in their lists of the "500 Greatest Albums of All Time". Pitchfork placed it among the "Top 100 Albums of the 1970s", while Q magazine gave it a spot on the list of the "100 Greatest British Albums Ever". Classic Rock named it as one of the "10 glam rock albums you should definitely own".

Accolades for For Your Pleasure
Publication	List	Year	Rank	Ref.
Q	100 Greatest British Albums Ever	2000	33	
Pitchfork	Top 100 Albums of the 1970s	2004	87	
NME	500 Greatest Albums of All Time	2013	88	
Rolling Stone	500 Greatest Albums of All Time	2020	351	(Note: In the initial ranking in 2003, For Your Pleasure was ranked number 394 on Rolling Stone's list of the 500 greatest albums of all time, with the album's ranking dropping to number 396 in the 2012 update of the list, eventually climbing to number 351 in the 2020 update.)

== Track listing ==
All tracks are written by Bryan Ferry.

Side one
No.	Title	Length
1.	"Do the Strand"	4:04
2.	"Beauty Queen"	4:41
3.	"Strictly Confidential"	3:48
4.	"Editions of You"	3:51
5.	"In Every Dream Home a Heartache" ( (Note: LP editions of the album incorrectly listed the song's timing as 4:25, due to its "false fade" referenced above))	5:29

Side two
No.	Title	Length
1.	"The Bogus Man"	9:22
2.	"Grey Lagoons"	4:11
3.	"For Your Pleasure"	6:58
Total length:		42:24

== Personnel ==
The personnel is adapted from the liner notes.

Roxy Music

- Bryan Ferry – vocals, keyboards
- Brian Eno – VCS3 synthesiser and tapes
- Andy Mackay – oboe, saxophone
- Phil Manzanera – electric guitar
- Paul Thompson – drums

Guest artiste

- John Porter – bass guitar

Production

- Chris Thomas, John Anthony, Roxy Music – record producers
- Roxy Music – musical arrangers
- John Middleton – sound engineer
- John Punter – sound engineer
- Jennings – crew
- Bryan Ferry – art direction, cover art concept
- Karl Stoecker – photography
- Nicholas Deville – art direction, photography
- CCS – artwork
- Antony Price – clothing/wardrobe, make-up, hair stylist
- Smile – hair stylist
- Amanda Lear – cover star
- Bob Ludwig – digital remastering

== Charts ==
Chart (1973)	Peak position
Australian Albums (Kent Music Report)	41
Austrian Albums (Ö3 Austria)	9
German Albums (Offizielle Top 100)	28
Norwegian Albums (VG-lista)	15
UK Albums (Official Charts)	4
US Billboard 200	193

Chart (2022)	Peak position
Scottish Albums (Official Charts)	42

Chart (2026)	Peak position
German Pop Albums (Offizielle Top 100)	12

== Certifications ==
Region	Certification	Certified units/sales
United Kingdom (BPI)	Gold	100,000^{^}
^{^} Shipments figures based on certification alone.
