= In Every Dream Home a Heartache =

Song by Roxy Music

from the album For Your Pleasure
- Released: 23 March 1973
- Recorded: February 1973
- Studio: Command Studios (London)
- Genre: Art rock; proto-punk
- Length: 5:29
- Label: E.G.
- Songwriter: Bryan Ferry
- Producers: Chris Thomas; John Anthony; Roxy Music

"In Every Dream Home a Heartache" is a song written by Bryan Ferry, originally appearing on his band Roxy Music's second studio album, For Your Pleasure (1973).

Lyrically, the song is a sinister monologue, part critique of the emptiness of opulence, partly a love song to an inflatable doll. Musically this is complemented by a cycling four-bar chord progression (E♭ G♭ F A♭), led by a 'cinema organ' style Farfisa part. After the lyrical conclusion "I blew up your body/but you blew my mind!", the song climaxes with an extended instrumental section, with the lead taken by guitarist Phil Manzanera.

On the original vinyl LP, the song was the last one on side A, and appeared to fade out into the run-out groove, only to return, heavily processed with phase shifting techniques. This style is preserved on the CD release.

The song was performed by Roxy Music on the BBC television music show The Old Grey Whistle Test, and regularly in live sets, and it appears on Roxy Music's live albums Viva! (1976) and Concerto (2001). The band's live performance on an edition of the German Beat-Club shows Mackay playing the organ part, with Ferry on rhythm guitar. Eno replaces the studio phase-shifting process with tape delay techniques.

The song was used in opening scene of the 2017 tv series, Mindhunter, season 2 episode 1, the 2019 film The Gentlemen when Raymond Smith (Charlie Hunnam) breaks into a council estate flat, and over the end credits of the 2008 film While She Was Out. In 2019 it was used for Gucci’s fragrance promo for Memoire d’une Odeur featuring Harry Styles.

== Musicians ==
- Andy MacKay – Farfisa organ, saxophone
- Bryan Ferry – vocals, rhythm guitar
- Brian Eno – VCS 3 synthesizer, tape effects
- Paul Thompson – drums
- Phil Manzanera – guitar
- John Porter – bass
