= Pyjamarama (song) =

Single by Roxy Music
- B-side: "The Pride and the Pain"
- Released: 23 February 1973
- Recorded: February 1973 at AIR Studios, London
- Genre: Art rock, glam rock
- Length: 3:00 (Original Island version); 2:52 (Polydor remix)
- Label: Island
- Songwriter: Bryan Ferry
- Producers: Chris Thomas; John Anthony; Roxy Music

Roxy Music singles chronology
"Virginia Plain" (1972)	"Pyjamarama" (1973)	"Do the Strand" (1973)

"Pyjamarama" is a song by the English rock band Roxy Music, released as a single in February 1973. It reached a peak of number 10 on the UK singles chart after a twelve-week charting stint. The song was written by Bryan Ferry, and it was the first one he wrote with the guitar as his instrument. It was backed by an instrumental non-LP track called "The Pride and the Pain" written by Andy Mackay.

In 1977, it was re-released as a single, together with "Virginia Plain", to promote their Greatest Hits album, and reached number 11. However, the 1977 release was a different mix with fewer sax treatments on it, and the closing guitar refrain was edited differently from the original Island 7" version. The original version (along with "The Pride and the Pain") was re-released on the box set The Thrill of It All, while the 1977 version can be found on the Street Life: 20 Great Hits compilation. In 2012, both mixes were included in the ten-disc boxed set The Complete Studio Recordings 1972–1982 on the bonus compilation Singles, B-sides and Alternative Mixes.

A live version appears on Viva! Roxy Music.

== Personnel ==
- Bryan Ferry – vocals, guitar
- Brian Eno – VCS3 synthesizer
- Andrew Mackay – saxophone
- Phil Manzanera – electric guitar
- John Porter – bass guitar
- Paul Thompson – drums
