= Do the Strand =

Single by Roxy Music

from the album For Your Pleasure
- B-side: "Editions of You"
- Released: July 1973
- Recorded: February 1973
- Studio: AIR Studios, London
- Genre: Glam rock; dance-rock; avant-pop
- Length: 4:04 (album); 3:19 (single)
- Label: Island
- Songwriter: Bryan Ferry
- Producers: Chris Thomas, John Anthony, Roxy Music

Roxy Music singles chronology
"Pyjamarama" (1973)	"Do the Strand" (1973)	"Street Life" (1973)

Official audio
- "Do the Strand" on YouTube

"Do the Strand" is the first song from English rock band Roxy Music's second album, For Your Pleasure. In contrast to the songs from Roxy Music's eponymous debut album, this song starts suddenly without any instrumental fanfare. Like the rest of the album, the song was recorded at AIR Studios in London, and issued on the Island Records label.

== Composition ==
"Do the Strand" was written by Roxy Music frontman Bryan Ferry. Ferry said of the song's origins: "I had long been a fan of Cole Porter and other songwriters from his era. 'Do the Strand' was an attempt to emulate that style of writing, with a lot of cultural references that I found interesting."

In the mode of early-1960s 'dance craze' songs such as "The Twist", the song tries to convince the listener to dance the Strand, which takes its name from a film noir advertisement for Strand cigarettes. The lyric includes, as is typical for early Roxy Music, references to notable art, including The Sphinx, the Mona Lisa, Lolita and Picasso's Guernica. Bryan Ferry described his idea for "The Strand" as "the 'dance of life' — thus bringing to mind earlier dance phenomena, such as the avant-garde passion and exuberance of both the Ballets Russes and the controversial Jazz Age dance craze the Charleston."

The song gives no instructions on how the Strand should be danced. Simon Puxley, writing in 1973 for the Bryan Ferry and Roxy Music Archive, suggested the dance was "indefinable" and best thought of as "where it's at, whatever turns you on. The buzz, the action, the centre, the quintessence, the energy."

== Release ==
"Do the Strand" was released as a single in 1973 in some countries but not in the UK. That same year, however, the band performed the song on the BBC music show The Old Grey Whistle Test. It was released as a single in the UK in 1978 to promote Roxy Music's Greatest Hits album, but it failed to chart. Despite this, the song remains one of the most popular amongst the band's fans, especially at live concerts.

The UK single cover features a photograph of Mackay, Ferry, Eno, Thompson and Manzanera, all posed with guitars.

== Legacy and cover versions ==
In 1972, an early incarnation of the Sex Pistols featuring Wally Nightingale called themselves The Strand, after Roxy Music's song "Do the Strand".

The German synthpop band Alphaville recorded a cover version of "Do the Strand" for their 2003 album CrazyShow. The American pop band Scissor Sisters recorded a cover version for the War Child charity's 2009 charity album War Child Presents Heroes.

== Personnel ==
- Andy Mackay – oboe and saxophone
- Bryan Ferry – voice and keyboards
- Brian Eno – synthesizer and tapes
- Paul Thompson – drums
- Phil Manzanera – guitar
- John Porter – bass
