= These Foolish Things (album) =

Studio album by Bryan Ferry
- Released: 5 October 1973
- Recorded: June 1973
- Studios: AIR, London
- Genres: Traditional pop; glam rock
- Length: 43:46
- Label: Island Records (UK) / Atlantic Records (North America)
- Producers: Bryan Ferry; John Porter; John Punter

Bryan Ferry chronology
These Foolish Things (1973)	Another Time, Another Place (1974)

These Foolish Things is the debut solo studio album by Bryan Ferry, who continued additionally to be Roxy Music's lead vocalist. The album was released in October 1973 on Island Records in the United Kingdom and Atlantic Records in the United States. It is considered to be a departure from Roxy Music's sound, being made up of far more 'straight' versions of standards. Additionally, where Roxy Music's albums were of songs composed by the band, These Foolish Things was a covers album. It was a commercial and critical success, peaking at number five on the UK Albums Chart. It received a gold certification from the British Phonographic Industry in May 1974.

Most of the tracks on the album were personal favorites of Ferry's, and spanned several decades from 1930s standards such as the title track through 1950s Elvis Presley to Bob Dylan and the Rolling Stones.

"A Hard Rain's a-Gonna Fall" was released as a single and reached number 10 in the UK Singles Chart in September 1973.

== Composition ==
Speaking about the album in 1973, Ferry said: "It's a very catholic selection, I've given up trying to please all of the people all of the time. Some will like it for one reason, some for another. And some will presumably dislike it for the wrong reasons, though I hope the general point of it will be understood. It's amusement value. I think."

== Release ==
The album's release coincided with David Bowie's covers album Pin Ups. As Ferry had recorded his album weeks before Bowie began work on Pin Ups, Ferry was annoyed at the perceived copying of his project, calling it a "rip-off". According to biographer Christopher Sandford, he allegedly went to his label Island Records to request they file an injunction to prevent Pin Ups from being released before These Foolish Things. Instead, the author Chris O'Leary writes that Bowie phoned Ferry to inform him of Pin Ups and requested permission to record a Roxy Music song. Ferry later told the biographer David Buckley, "At first I was a bit apprehensive, but Bowie's record turned out to be very different. I myself was always very anxious to be different from other people ... and to forge my own furrow." In the event, both albums were released as planned and charted on the same day, 3 November 1973.

== Critical reception ==
Professional ratings
Review scores
Source	Rating
AllMusic	4/5 stars
Christgau's Record Guide	A−
Overdose	A−
Q	4/5 stars
The Rolling Stone Album Guide	5/5 stars

Robert Christgau found that Ferry "both undercuts the inflated idealism of [Bob Dylan's 'A Hard Rain's a-Gonna Fall'] and reaffirms its essential power", establishes Lesley Gore's "It's My Party" as a protest song, and with his cover of "These Foolish Things", "reminds us that pop is only, well, foolish things, many of which predate not only Andy Warhol but rock and roll itself." In 1983's The New Rolling Stone Record Guide, Dave Marsh wrote:

These Foolish Things pits Lesley Gore against Bob Dylan, and not just for effect. Ferry views pop as a kind of continuum, extending through all sorts of Tin Pan Alley and Brill Building craftsmanship and incorporating visions as radical as Dylan's and as banal as Gore's. Within such a sensibility discerning what deserves to be dismissed as "trash" and what deserves elevation as "art" is not a simple problem. And such designations are so often determined by context that their order can be reversed almost at will. By altering tempos and singing every song with the deadpan emotional blankness he largely avoids with Roxy, Ferry exposes these issues as effectively as any pop singer in history.

In AllMusic, critic Ned Raggett said that throughout These Foolish Things, "Ferry's instantly recognizable croon carries everything to a tee, and the overall mood is playful and celebratory", calling the album "one of the best of its kind by any artist." Rob Sheffield, in 2004's The New Rolling Stone Album Guide, praised it as a "conceptual and musical tour de force". In 2010, Rhapsody listed These Foolish Things as one of the best covers albums.

== Track listing ==
Side one
No.	Title	Writer(s)	Original artist & album	Length
1.	"A Hard Rain's a-Gonna Fall"	Bob Dylan	Bob Dylan, from The Freewheelin' Bob Dylan (1963)	5:19
2.	"River of Salt"	Irving Brown, Bernard Zackery, Jan Zackery	Ketty Lester, from Love Letters (1962)	1:48
3.	"Don't Ever Change"	Gerry Goffin, Carole King	The Crickets 1962 single	2:15
4.	"Piece of My Heart"	Jerry Ragovoy, Bert Berns	Erma Franklin 1967 single	3:06
5.	"Baby I Don't Care"	Jerry Leiber, Mike Stoller	Elvis Presley, from the motion picture Jailhouse Rock (1957)	1:50
6.	"It's My Party"	Walter Gold, John Gluck Jr., Herb Weiner	Lesley Gore, from I'll Cry If I Want to (1963)	2:00
7.	"Don't Worry Baby"	Brian Wilson, Roger Christian	The Beach Boys, from Shut Down Volume 2 (1964)	4:13

Side two
No.	Title	Writer(s)	Original artist & album	Length
1.	"Sympathy for the Devil"	Mick Jagger, Keith Richards	The Rolling Stones, from Beggars Banquet (1968)	5:50
2.	"The Tracks of My Tears"	Smokey Robinson, Warren Moore, Marv Tarplin	The Miracles, from Going to a Go-Go (1965)	3:04
3.	"You Won't See Me"	John Lennon, Paul McCartney	The Beatles, from Rubber Soul (1965)	2:32
4.	"I Love How You Love Me"	Barry Mann, Larry Kolber	The Paris Sisters 1961 single	3:02
5.	"Loving You Is Sweeter Than Ever"	Ivy Jo Hunter, Stevie Wonder	Four Tops, from On Top (1966)	3:06
6.	"These Foolish Things"	Jack Strachey, Eric Maschwitz and Harry Link	Traditional	5:41
Total length:				43:46

== Personnel ==
=== Musicians ===
- Bryan Ferry – lead vocals, acoustic piano
- Eddie Jobson – keyboards, synthesizers, violin
- David Skinner – acoustic piano
- John Porter – guitars, bass
- Phil Manzanera – guitar solo (10)
- Paul Thompson – drums
- John Punter – additional drums (7, 8)
- Roger Ball – alto saxophone, baritone saxophone, horn arrangements
- Ruan O'Lochlainn – alto saxophone solo (11)
- Malcolm Duncan – tenor saxophone
- Henry Lowther – trumpet
- Robbie Montgomery – backing vocals (1, 8)
- Jessie Davis – backing vocals (1, 8)
- The Angelettes – backing vocals (2–7, 9–13)

=== Production ===
- Bryan Ferry – producer
- John Porter – producer
- John Punter – producer, engineer
- Steve Nye – engineer
- Andy Arthurs – assistant engineer
- Nicholas De Ville – cover design
- Karl Stoecker – photography

== Charts ==
=== Weekly charts ===
Chart (1973)	Peak position
Australian Albums (Kent Music Report)	18
Dutch Albums (Album Top 100)	10
UK Albums (Official Charts)	5

=== Year-end charts ===
Chart (1973)	Position
Dutch Albums (Album Top 100)	70

== Certifications ==
Region	Certification	Certified units/sales
United Kingdom (BPI)	Gold	100,000^{^}
^{^} Shipments figures based on certification alone.
