= Siren (Roxy Music album) =

Studio album by Roxy Music
- Released: 24 October 1975
- Recorded: June – September 1975
- Studio: AIR (London)
- Genres: Art rock; glam rock; art pop
- Length: 42:30
- Labels: Island; Atco
- Producer: Chris Thomas

Roxy Music chronology
| Country Life (1974) | Siren (1975) | Viva! (1976) |

Singles from Siren
- 1. "Love Is the Drug" Released: 26 September 1975; 2. "Both Ends Burning" Released: 19 December 1975

Siren is the fifth studio album by the English rock band Roxy Music, released on 24 October 1975 by Island Records. It was released by Atco Records in the United States.

Siren produced the singles "Love Is the Drug" and "Both Ends Burning", which peaked at numbers two and 25 respectively on the UK Singles Chart. "Love Is the Drug" became Roxy Music's highest-charting single in the US, reaching number 30 on the Billboard Hot 100. In 2003, Siren was ranked number 371 on Rolling Stone magazine's list of the 500 Greatest Albums of All Time.

== Cover art ==
The cover features band member Bryan Ferry's soon-to-be girlfriend, model Jerry Hall, on rocks near South Stack, Anglesey. Graham Hughes, working during August 1975, took the cover photo directly below the central span of the bridge on a south-side slope. He worked from sketches produced by Antony Price, with photography featuring Hall striking various poses. The idea for the location was Bryan Ferry's, after he saw a TV documentary about lava flows and rock formations in Anglesey, in which South Stack was heavily featured.

== Critical reception ==
Professional ratings
Review scores
| Source | Rating |
|---|---|
| AllMusic | 5/5 stars |
| Pitchfork | 8.7/10 |
| Q | 4/5 stars |
| The Rolling Stone Album Guide | 5/5 stars |
| Spin Alternative Record Guide | 10/10 |
| The Village Voice | A− |

In a contemporary review of Siren for Melody Maker, critic Allan Jones praised it as "a superb album, striking the listener immediately with a force and invention reserved only for the most special musical experiences". He noted a "crispness and vitality" in Chris Thomas's production, which he felt showcased "the sense of adventure and cavalier spirit which marked their early recordings, an impetuosity which has lately been absent from their work." Rolling Stone writer Simon Frith highlighted the album's more "focused" lyrical imagery and streamlined production, noting "less synthesized clutter, fewer sound effects, more straight solo trading." Robert Christgau of The Village Voice found the album's more pop-leaning sound to be revelatory: "Of course, Roxy Music albums have always had hooks, but 'Street Life' and 'Virginia Plain' never told us as much about Roxy's less accessible music as 'Love Is the Drug'". He ranked it the 11th best album of 1975 in his year-end "Dean's List". Siren placed at number 13 on The Village Voice's 1975 Pazz & Jop critics' poll.

Critic Greil Marcus included Siren in the appendix of his 1979 book Stranded: Rock and Roll for a Desert Island, with the following accompanying write-up: "Don Juan Faces Life: With the band hitting the limits of the music that grew from Rubber Soul, Ferry dismantled his lounge lizard act bit by bit, until all that was left was what his entire career had meant to hide: 'an average man', but one with enough emotion to record for Motown."

== Legacy ==
Siren remains one of Roxy Music's most critically acclaimed albums. Critic Dave Marsh described Siren in 1983 as "Roxy's masterpiece, calling the listener back by virtue of its finely honed instrumental attack and compelling lyrical attitude". In a retrospective review for AllMusic, Stephen Thomas Erlewine wrote that Roxy Music's unabashed embrace of dance and pop music on Siren, while resulting in their distinctive "artier tendencies" being toned down, produces "a thematic consistency that works in [the album's] favor" and elevates it "into the realm of classics". Rob Sheffield refers to Siren as "the first Roxy Music album without any failed moments" in 2004's The New Rolling Stone Album Guide. Simon Reynolds was less receptive in a 1999 article for Uncut. He acknowledged that Siren continued to be "universally" held in high regard, particularly by American critics, but considered it and its predecessor Country Life to be "conventional and tame" compared to the band's earlier output.

Rolling Stone ranked Siren at number 371 on its 2003 list of the 500 greatest albums of all time, and at number 374 on a 2012 version of the list. Vibe included it in its list of the 100 essential albums of the 20th century, describing it as a fusion of "the esoteric murk of early Roxy" and "the aching, ardently romantic tone that defines their later work".

== Track listing ==
All tracks are written by Bryan Ferry, except where noted.

Side one
| No. | Title | Writer(s) | Length |
|---|---|---|---|
| 1. | "Love Is the Drug" | Ferry, Andy Mackay | 4:11 |
| 2. | "End of the Line" | | 5:14 |
| 3. | "Sentimental Fool" | Ferry, Andy Mackay | 6:14 |
| 4. | "Whirlwind" | Ferry, Phil Manzanera | 3:38 |

Side two
| No. | Title | Writer(s) | Length |
|---|---|---|---|
| 1. | "She Sells" | Ferry, Eddie Jobson | 3:39 |
| 2. | "Could It Happen to Me?" | | 3:36 |
| 3. | "Both Ends Burning" | | 5:16 |
| 4. | "Nightingale" | Ferry, Phil Manzanera | 4:11 |
| 5. | "Just Another High" | | 6:31 |
| Total length: | | | 42:30 |

On cassette tapes (e.g. Island ZC19344) "Whirlwind" and "Just Another High" (the last track of each side) are swapped, presumably for optimum tape length.

== Personnel ==
Roxy Music

- Bryan Ferry – vocals, keyboards, harmonica
- Andy Mackay – oboe, saxophone
- Phil Manzanera – guitars
- Paul Thompson – drums
- Eddie Jobson – violin, synthesizers, keyboards

Additional musicians

- John Gustafson – bass

Production

- Chris Thomas – producer
- Steve Nye – recording engineer
- Ross Cullum – assistant engineer
- Michael Sellers – assistant engineer
- Bob Ludwig – remastering engineer (1999)

== Charts ==
=== Weekly charts ===
| Chart (1975–76) | Peak position |
|---|---|
| Australian Albums (Kent Music Report) | 12 |
| Canada Top Albums/CDs (RPM) | 53 |
| Dutch Albums (Album Top 100) | 9 |
| New Zealand Albums (RMNZ) | 33 |
| Norwegian Albums (VG-lista) | 15 |
| Swedish Albums (Sverigetopplistan) | 8 |
| UK Albums (Official Charts) | 4 |
| US Billboard 200 | 50 |

=== Year-end charts ===
| Chart (1975) | Position |
|---|---|
| Dutch Albums (Album Top 100) | 47 |

== Certifications ==
| Region | Certification | Certified units/sales |
|---|---|---|
| United Kingdom (BPI) | Gold | 100,000^{^} |
^{^} Shipments figures based on certification alone.
