= Jake Andrews (guitarist) =

American singer (born 1980)

- Born: April 16, 1980 (age 46)
- Origin: Austin, Texas, United States
- Genre: Blues rock
- Occupations: Guitarist, singer, songwriter
- Instrument: Guitar
- Years active: 1999–present
- Label: Jericho Records
- Website: www.myspace.com/jakeandrews

Jake Andrews (born April 16, 1980) is an American blues rock guitarist, singer and songwriter from Austin, Texas.

== Life and career ==
Andrews began playing guitar at age five, taught by his father, John Andrews of the 1960s band, Mother Earth. At an early age, he began attending shows at the blues venue, Antone's, to see blues musicians such as B. B. King and Albert Collins perform. At age eight, Andrews first went onstage to play guitar with Albert King. Impressed with the young guitarist, King invited him to play with him for his entire second set. That moment sparked Andrews' young career, and he continued to hone his skills in the clubs of Austin, Texas, regularly performing with local musicians such as Jimmie Vaughan.

Andrews has performed with B. B. King, Buddy Guy, and Albert King. He has also performed at music festivals such as the San Francisco Blues Festival and Madison Blues Festival with Ray Charles. He has been featured on CBS, Austin City Limits, Texas Monthly, Guitar Player, and Vintage Guitar amongst numerous other publications. He has also toured the US and Europe extensively.

At the age of 17, Andrews was signed to Jericho Records, a subsidiary of Warner Bros. Working with the record producer, John Porter at the Ocean Way Studios in Los Angeles, in 1999, Andrews released his debut album Time to Burn. The first title single scored a Top Ten Rock Radio hit, and Andrews earned the award of "Breakout Rock Group" in 1999 by R&R (Radio and Records). The record was supported with a major US tour with artists including the Allman Brothers, The Doobie Brothers, Susan Tedeschi, and George Thorogood.

In 2002, Andrews released a second self-titled album produced by Carla Olson. The album was recorded at Willie Nelson's Perdernales Studios outside of Austin. In 2006, Andrews joined Guitar Shorty, on his Alligator Release, We The People. The album won "Album of the Year" at the Blues Music Awards in May 2007. Andrews toured with Guitar Shorty in that year.

In 2007, Andrews released his third album, Feelin' Good Again. The album was recorded in Austin, and was produced by Andrews and Mike Sconce. Andrews wrote all of the songs, and was featured as guitarist and vocalist. He enlisted the drummer Alvino Bennett and Michael Ramos on keyboards.

Andrews was featured on a solo album by Paul Jones released on March 10, 2009, on CRS (Europe, Collectors’ Choice Music (USA). Backing Jones on the project were Eric Clapton, who played guitar on two tracks ("Choose or Cop Out" and "Starting All Over Again") and by Jake Andrews; Tony Marsico; Alvino Bennett; Mike Thompson; Ernie Watts; Darrell Leonard; Tom Junior Morgan; and Mikael Rickfors. A second Paul Jones album, Suddenly I Like It, was released in early 2015 featuring Andrews, Marsico, Bennett and Thompson again, as well as Joe Bonamassa, Jools Holland, Vince Melouney, Gregg Sutton, Tom Jr Morgan, and Little Willie G.

Andrews latest solo release was Train Back Home (2023), with Carla Olson producing the recording.

== Discography ==
=== Solo ===
- Time To Burn (1999)
- Jake Andrews (2002)
- Feelin' Good Again (2007)
- In The Shadows (2017)
- Train Back Home (2023)

=== Collaborations ===
- Grey Ghost: Grey Chost (1992)
- Long John Hunter: Border Town Legend (1996)
- Various Artists: Blue Xmas (2001)
- Guitar Shorty: We The People (2006)
- Ernie Halter: Congress Hotel (2007)
- Paul Jones: Starting All Over Again (2009)
- Paul Jones: Suddenly I Like It (2015)
