= Jorja Chalmers =

Australian saxophone and keyboard player

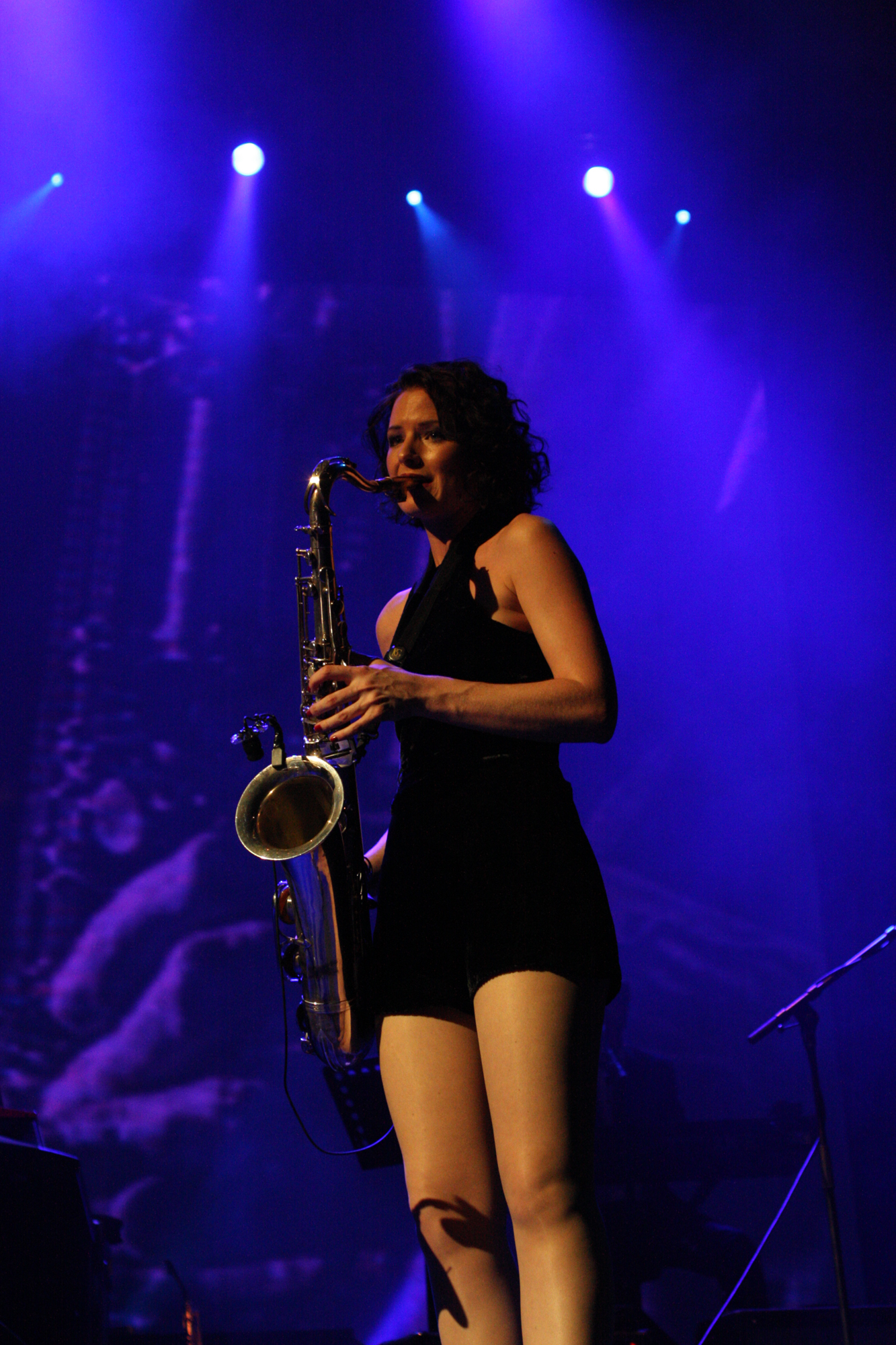
- Chalmers performing in 2011

Background information
- Born: 1982; Sydney, Australia
- Genres: Pop rock; art rock
- Occupations: Musician
- Instruments: Saxophone; keyboards

Jorja Chalmers is an Australian saxophonist and keyboardist who has toured globally with bands and performers such as Bryan Ferry, Take That and the Ting Tings. When Ferry's band, Roxy Music, was inducted into the Rock and Roll Hall of Fame, Ferry's speech noted Chalmers' contributions to the band. Chalmers has been described as someone who "steals the show, blasting out the sax lines with a refreshing brashness."

Chalmers studied at Sydney Conservatorium of Music. Some years after she achieved international success as a musician in bands and as a solo artist, one of her teachers at the school commented, "She had this incredible drive. She wanted to do well, and I’m not at all surprised that she has." In the years since her time in Australia, Chalmers moved to London. She performs as a studio musician and in touring bands.

In September 2019, Chalmers released her debut album Human Again via the US independent record label Italians Do It Better. All instruments and voices on the dark ambient themed album were performed, recorded and produced by Chalmers. Chromatics member Johnny Jewel served as an Executive Producer. One reviewer said Human Again is a "rather captivating record that is well worth the time and space, exuding quality in abundance." Another reviewer commented, "The synth-based tracks of Jorja Chalmers’s deep-dreaming debut Human Again are a cartography of unreal things that feel very real indeed."

Her second album Midnight Train was released on May 28, 2021.
