= Karl Stoecker =

American photographer

Karl Stoecker is an American glamour photographer, known for his album cover photographs of the 1970s for rock music acts.

== Early life ==
Stoecker was born in Brooklyn, New York.

At Syracuse University in the early 1960s, Stoecker was a close friend of Shelley Albin, Lou Reed's girlfriend. At the time Stoecker was married, and lived off-campus with his wife. Stoecker was there as an art student. He was an editor of Reed's poetry magazine The Lonely Woman Quarterly. The coterie around the magazine included Lincoln Swados, brother of Elizabeth Swados, and Jim Tucker, brother of Moe Tucker. Stoecker and Albin did the artwork.

== In London ==
In the mid-1960s Stoecker moved to the United Kingdom. He is quoted as saying "When I first went to London in 1966, it felt like the 1950s hadn't really gone away." He had a London photographic studio above a garage in St Michael's Street, off Edgware Road. He used Ronald Falloon as agent for his photographic work.

Stoecker emulated the "Vargas Girl" pin-up style of Alberto Vargas; Vargas took over the role at Esquire magazine, using airbrush and watercolor, that has been played by George Petty who had provided stylized drawings of women. Stoecker's friendship with Nigel Waymouth led to a photographic session with the model Nicky Samuel, Waymouth's first wife. A shoot by Stoecker of Amanda Lear appeared in Oui magazine in September 1974 under the title "Art punches Amanda out of shape"); it was based on works of Allen Jones.

== Later life ==
Stoecker, "a lanky, blond magazine photographer in his late 50s", was in Miami when he spoke to The Christian Science Monitor in 2000. In 2014, when his work was exhibited at Balans restaurant, Stoecker was living in South Beach, Florida. He is now photographer to the family business Posh Vintage.Com. His son Luke Flynn (actor), son of Arnella Flynn (died 1998) and grandson of Errol Flynn, an actor and model, was reported in 2003 by the New York Times also to be involved with the business run by his stepmother Patti Stoecker. In connection with family matters, the spelling Carl Stoecker is sometimes used.

== Works ==
Stoecker worked for Roxy Music, Sparks and Lou Reed. In the case of Roxy Music, he joined the team round Bryan Ferry that included also Antony Price, Nick de Ville and the publicist Simon Puxley. His iconic album cover images were created for Island Records, in collaboration also with Island's marketing director Tim Clark. David Enthoven of EG Management, also involved in the process, considered that the album art played a significant role in Island signing up Roxy Music. Alwyn Turner wrote:

Bryan Ferry, having studied under Richard Hamilton at art school, had an affection for the airbrushed gloss of advertising, and used fantasy images of women, shot by fashion photographer Karl Stoecker.

The first album cover was for Roxy Music (1971), a shot from a session by Stoecker, with styling by Price. The model was Kari-Ann Muller. The Vargas-influenced style has been called "retro-cheesecake". It was followed by Stoecker's work for For Your Pleasure (1972), with Amanda Lear as a "pathologically elegant" woman with a black panther on a leash; and Stranded (1973), with an Amazonian Marilyn Cole in red. According to Ferry, after Stranded Stoecker moved to Milan.

Stoecker also took the back cover photo used on Lou Reed's album Transformer (1972), for which the front cover was done by Mick Rock. It featured the fashion model Gala Mitchell, and Ernie Thormahlen, who was Reed's road manager at the time.

The cover for Sparks' breakthrough album Kimono My House (1974) was photographed by Stoecker for a design by de Ville. It featured two Japanese geishas, the models belonging to the Red Buddha Theatre of Stomu Yamashta. They were Michi Hirota, who sang on It's No Game, and Kuniko Okamura.
