= Stranded (album) =

Studio album by Roxy Music
- Released: November 1973
- Recorded: September 1973
- Studio: AIR (London)
- Genre: Art rock; progressive rock
- Length: 41:06
- Label: Island; Atco
- Producer: Chris Thomas

Roxy Music chronology
For Your Pleasure (1973)	Stranded (1973)	Country Life (1974)

Singles from Stranded
- 1. "Street Life" Released: November 1973

Stranded is the third studio album by the English rock band Roxy Music, released in 1973 by Island Records (it was released by Atco Records in the United States). Stranded was the first Roxy Music album on which Bryan Ferry was not the sole songwriter, with multi-instrumentalist Andy Mackay and guitarist Phil Manzanera also making songwriting contributions. It is also their first album with multi-instrumentalist Eddie Jobson, who replaced synthesizer player Brian Eno.

Stranded reached number one on the UK albums chart. The track "Street Life" was released as a single and reached number 9 on the UK singles chart. In the US, Stranded charted at number 186.

== Cover art ==
The gatefold cover photograph was taken by Karl Stoecker and styled by Antony Price, and shows Playboy model Marilyn Cole. In an interview with the writer Tony Barrell in 2007, Cole recalled:

It was at a tiny studio, somewhere off the Edgware Road in London. I'd never even heard of Roxy Music. I very soon understood that I was in safe hands, among some very talented people. There was a red dress hanging up, and I thought, 'Ooh, good, I'm going to get to wear a really nice dress'... whereupon, as I'm having my make-up done, Antony comes in and starts ripping the dress – a hole there, a slash there. I was thinking, 'Oh no.' They stuck me on this big log and explained I was supposed to be stranded in a jungle, and then they started spraying me; they sprayed my hair gold, and there was a whole mist coming over me and the dress was getting wet in all the right places.

== Critical reception ==
Professional ratings
Review scores
Source	Rating
AllMusic	4.5/5 stars
Christgau's Record Guide	B+
Overdose	A+
Pitchfork	9.2/10
Q	3/5 stars
The Rolling Stone Album Guide	4/5 stars
Select	4/5
Spin Alternative Record Guide	9/10

Reviewing for Rolling Stone in 1974, Paul Gambaccini wrote: "Roxy Music can no longer be ignored by Americans. They may not achieve the commercial success they have in Britain, where Stranded reached Number One, but their artistic performance must be recognized. Stranded is an eloquent statement that there are still frontiers which American pop has not explored."

Reviewing for Creem in 1974, Robert Christgau found Ferry to be an "ambitious" but "oblique" artist and quoted New York artist Sidney Tillim's 1969 essay "A Variety of Realisms" to conclude his review of the album: "By moral in the context of art I mean a style which executes the deeper social and psychological function of form, as opposed to a particular aspect of vanity called taste. Pop sensibility, pop consciousness, pop sentimentality have been invaluable in clarifying the provincialism and nostalgia that actually permeate a culture that has come to pride itself on sophistication. But they have not resulted in a new art simply because the requisite idealism has been lacking."

In a positive retrospective review, AllMusic critic Stephen Thomas Erlewine wrote of the album: "Under the direction of Bryan Ferry, Roxy moved toward[s] relatively straightforward territory, adding greater layers of piano and heavy guitars. Even without the washes of Eno's synthesizers, Roxy's music remains unsettling on occasion, yet in this new incarnation, they favor more measured material."

Although it was the first Roxy Music album made without Brian Eno, Eno later described it as one of his personal favourite albums by the group.

== Covers ==
Bass guitarist John Taylor, during his solo period after leaving Duran Duran in 1997, organized a Roxy Music tribute album called Dream Home Heartaches: Remaking/Remodeling Roxy Music, which was released in 1999. On it, Ferry and Mackay's "A Song for Europe" was covered by Dave Gahan and "Street Life" was performed by Phantom 5 (a.k.a. Gerry Laffy and Simon Laffy).

"Amazona" was covered by Morrissey on his 2026 album Make-Up Is a Lie.

== Track listing ==
All tracks are written by Bryan Ferry, except where noted.

Side one
No.	Title	Writer(s)	Length
1.	"Street Life"		3:29
2.	"Just Like You"		3:36
3.	"Amazona"	Ferry, Phil Manzanera	4:16
4.	"Psalm"		8:04

Side two
No.	Title	Writer(s)	Length
1.	"Serenade"		2:59
2.	"A Song for Europe"	Ferry, Andy Mackay	5:46
3.	"Mother of Pearl"		6:52
4.	"Sunset"		6:04

== Personnel ==
Roxy Music

- Bryan Ferry – vocals, piano, electric piano, harmonica, cover concept
- Andy Mackay (as Andrew Mackay) – oboe, saxophone, treatments
- Phil Manzanera – guitar, treatments
- Paul Thompson – drums, timpani
- Eddie Jobson – synthesizers, keyboards, electric violin

Additional personnel

- John Gustafson – bass guitar except on "Street Life"
- Chris Laurence – string bass on "Sunset"
- London Welsh Male Voice Choir – chorus on "Psalm"
- Chris Thomas – production, uncredited bass guitar on "Street Life"
- John Punter – engineer
- Nicolas de Ville – cover design
- Karl Stoecker – photography

== Charts ==
Chart (1973–1975)	Peak position
Australian Albums (Kent Music Report)	33
Finnish Albums (The Official Finnish Charts)	28
German Albums (Offizielle Top 100)	39
New Zealand Albums (RMNZ)	37
Norwegian Albums (VG-lista)	14
UK Albums (OCC)	1
US Billboard 200	186

Chart (2022)	Peak position
Scottish Albums (OCC)	88

== Certifications ==
Region	Certification	Certified units/sales
United Kingdom (BPI)	Gold	100,000^{^}
^{^} Shipments figures based on certification alone.
