= Virginia Plain =

Single by Roxy Music
- B-side: "The Numberer"
- Released: 4 August 1972 (UK)
- Recorded: 10–12 July 1972
- Studio: Command Studios, 201 Piccadilly, London W1
- Genre: Glam rock; art rock; avant-pop; progressive pop
- Length: 2:58
- Label: E.G. WIP6144
- Songwriter: Bryan Ferry
- Producer: Peter Sinfield

Roxy Music singles chronology
"Virginia Plain" (1972)	"Pyjamarama" (1973)

Official audio
- "Virginia Plain" on YouTube

"Virginia Plain" is a song by the English rock band Roxy Music, released as their debut single in August 1972. Written by Roxy frontman Bryan Ferry, the song was recorded by the band in July 1972 at London's Command Studios. Backed with "The Numberer", an instrumental composed by Andy Mackay, as a single the song became a Top 10 hit in the UK, peaking at number four. On the New Zealand Listener charts it reached number six.

== History ==
The song was not included on the band's original UK debut album, Roxy Music, having not even been recorded when the album was released. After the success of the album in the UK, it was included on later re-issues. In 1977, it was re-released as a single, together with "Pyjamarama", originally the second Roxy Music single, to promote the Greatest Hits album, and reached number 11. Both "Virginia Plain" and "The Numberer" can be found on the 1995 The Thrill of It All boxset.

"Virginia Plain" features bass guitarist Rik Kenton, who joined after Graham Simpson left the band. It begins with a deceptively quiet introduction, followed by an instant increase of volume as soon as the vocals come in on the first verse. (Note: Note: NME wrote that the low volume intro was designed to trick listeners into turning up the volume, only to be shocked when it became too loud. This ruse was also used on Madonna's 1990 single "Hanky Panky".)

Former art student Ferry took the title "Virginia Plain" from one of his own paintings, featuring an image of cigarette packaging – "Virginia Plain" refers to a virginia tobacco cigarette without a filter (plain) rather than with one (tipped). Ferry later said in an interview:

It was a watercolour or a painting on paper. It was just like a surreal drawing of a giant cigarette packet, with a pin-up girl on it. I liked that phrase Virginia Plain…so it later became the title of the first single I put out with Roxy Music – with a slightly imponderable lyric...

The name "Robert E. Lee" refers to music industry lawyer Robert Lee, practising at London law firm Harbottle & Lewis at the time. Warhol superstar Baby Jane Holzer is also referenced in the lyrics "Baby Jane's in Acapulco / We are flying down to Rio" and "can't you see that Holzer mane?"

Phil Manzanera's guitar solo was improvised.

== Reception ==
In 2024 Rolling Stone ranked the song at number 348 in their updated list of the 500 Greatest Songs of All Time.

== Musicians ==
- Bryan Ferry – vocals, piano, Mellotron, harmonica (on "The Numberer")
- Andy Mackay – oboe, saxophone
- Brian Eno – VCS3 synthesizer, treatments
- Paul Thompson – drums
- Phil Manzanera – electric guitar
- Rik Kenton – bass guitar

== In popular culture ==
- Virgin Atlantic operated a Boeing 747-400 aircraft named Virginia Plain from 1997 to 2013 with tail registration G-VTOP.
- In the Sex Pistols documentary The Filth and the Fury, Sex Pistols guitarist Steve Jones mentions Roxy Music as a major childhood influence while a part of the Top of the Pops performance of "Virginia Plain" is shown. Jones later appeared in the 2009 BBC film More Than This – The Story of Roxy Music, repeating his praise.
- The song is prominently featured in Todd Haynes's 1998 film Velvet Goldmine.
