= John Porter (musician, born 1947) =

British musician (born 1947)

John Porter (born 11 September 1947 in Leeds) is an English musician and record producer.

== Biography ==
He attended St Michael's College, Allerton Grange School, and Newcastle University.

While at Newcastle, Porter met singer Bryan Ferry, and was part of his fledgling band The Gas Board. Ferry's later band Roxy Music had achieved success in the early 1970s, but having had some troubles with bass players, Ferry invited Porter on board to record the 1973 album For Your Pleasure before the band found a permanent bassist. Porter went on to serve as a record producer for many later albums for Roxy Music and Bryan Ferry.

He has since produced for The Smiths, Billy Bragg, The Blades, Microdisney, School of Fish, B. B. King, Los Lonely Boys, Buddy Guy, Ryan Adams, Missy Higgins and numerous other bands. Lol Tolhurst, a founding member of The Cure, stated that Porter was the producer for the second album recorded by another of his bands, Presence.

In 1983, Porter married to Linda Keith.

== Selected discography ==
=== 1970–1989 ===
- 1973 For Your Pleasure - Roxy Music credited as Guest artiste
- 1973 These Foolish Things – Bryan Ferry
- 1975 Sunny Side of the Street – Bryn Haworth
- 1983 Fire Dances – Killing Joke
- 1984 The Smiths – The Smiths
- 1984 Everybody Is Fantastic – Microdisney
- 1985 Hatful of Hollow – The Smiths (compilation album, selected tracks only)
- 1985 Meat Is Murder – The Smiths ("How Soon Is Now?" only)
- 1986 The Queen Is Dead – The Smiths ("Frankly Mr Shankly" only)
- 1986 Talking with the Taxman About Poetry – Billy Bragg
- 1987 Eye of the Hurricane – The Alarm
- 1987 Bingo Durango – Bingo Durango
- 1987 Louder Than Bombs – The Smiths (compilation album, selected tracks only)
- 1987 The World Won't Listen – The Smiths (compilation album, selected tracks only)
- 1989 The Ocean Blue – The Ocean Blue (Drifting, Falling) (The Office of a Busy Man)

=== 1990–1999 ===
- 1991 School of Fish – School of Fish
- 1991 Damn Right, I've Got the Blues – Buddy Guy (Grammy Winner)
- 1992 Drenched – Miracle Legion
- 1992 Best of The Smiths Vol. 1 & 2 – The Smiths (compilation albums, selected tracks only)
- 1993 Stone – Crash Vegas
- 1993 Dancing the Blues – Taj Mahal (Grammy Nominee)
- 1993 Feels Like Rain – Buddy Guy (Grammy Winner)
- 1994 Ain't Enough Comin' In – Otis Rush (Grammy Nominee)
- 1994 Keb' Mo' – Keb' Mo'
- 1994 Meet Me at Midnite – Maria Muldaur (Grammy Nominee)
- 1994 Return to the Valley of the Go-Go's – The Go-Go's
- 1994 Simpatico – Velocity Girl
- 1995 Good Girl – The Go-Go's
- 1995 Singles – The Smiths (compilation album, selected tracks only)
- 1995 Sweet and Tender Hooligan – The Smiths
- 1996 Just Like You – Keb' Mo' (Grammy Winner)
- 1996 No Doy – moe.
- 1996 This Can't Be Life – Wild Colonials (Co-produced with Tony Berg)
- 1996 Phantom Blues – Taj Mahal (Grammy Winner)
- 1997 Blues For the Lost Days – John Mayall
- 1997 Deuces Wild – B.B. King (Grammy Nominee)
- 1997 Señor Blues – Taj Mahal (Grammy Winner)
- 1998 Smile Like Yours – John Lee Hooker
- 1998 Blues on the Bayou – B.B. King (Grammy Winner)
- 1998 Silver Tones: The Best of John Mayall – John Mayall
- 1999 Moonburn – Jon Cleary and the Absolute Monster Gentlemen
- 1999 Reaching to the Converted – Billy Bragg
- 1999 Time to Burn – Jake Andrews

=== 2000–2009 ===
- 2000 End of Bliss – Wonderland
- 2000 Makin' Love is Good For You – B.B. King (Grammy Winner)
- 2000 Wish I Was in Heaven Sitting Down – R. L. Burnside (Grammy Nominee)
- 2001 Dot Com Blues – Jimmy Smith (Grammy Nominee)
- 2001 Double Dealin' – Lucky Peterson (Grammy Nominee)
- 2001 Down to Earth (Limited Edition) – Ozzy Osbourne
- 2002 Dirty Sexy Nights in Paris – Audiovent
- 2002 Jon Cleary and the Absolute Monster Gentlemen – Jon Cleary and the Absolute Monster Gentlemen
- 2003 Los Lonely Boys – Los Lonely Boys (Grammy Winner)
- 2003 Love is Hell Pt. 1 & 2 – Ryan Adams (Grammy Nominees)
- 2003 Martin Scorsese Presents the Blues – Red, White, and Blues (Grammy Winners)
- 2003 Punch the Clock – Elvis Costello
- 2004 Los Lonely Boys – Los Lonely Boys (Grammy Nominee)
- 2004 Keep It Simple – Keb' Mo' (Grammy Winner)
- 2004 Pin Your Spin – Jon Cleary and the Absolute Monster Gentlemen
- 2005 All That I Am – Carlos Santana
- 2005 Live at the Filmore – Los Lonely Boys
- 2005 Man Alive! – Stephen Stills
- 2005 The Sound of White – Missy Higgins
- 2006 Out of the Shadows – Phantom Blues Band
- 2006 Sacred – Los Lonely Boys
- 2006 Suitcase – Keb' Mo' (Grammy Nominee)
- 2007 Painkiller – Tommy Castro
- 2007 So Many Nights – The Cat Empire
- 2007 Still Making History – Ana Popović

=== 2010–2019 ===
- 2011 Live at Chickie Wah Wah – Meschiya Lake and Tom McDermott
- 2012 Blind Sighted Faith – The Dunwells
- 2015 Ain’t Bad Yet – Micke Bjorklof & Blue Strip

== Roxy Music discography ==
Porter is credited on the following Roxy Music, Andy Mackay and Bryan Ferry works:

- For Your Pleasure
- These Foolish Things
- In Search of Eddie Riff (1974 version)
- Another Time, Another Place
- In Search of Eddie Riff (1975 version)
- Let's Stick Together
- In Your Mind
- "A Song For Europe"
- In Search of Eddie Riff (2000 CD version)
