= Paul Thompson (musician) =

English drummer (born 1951)

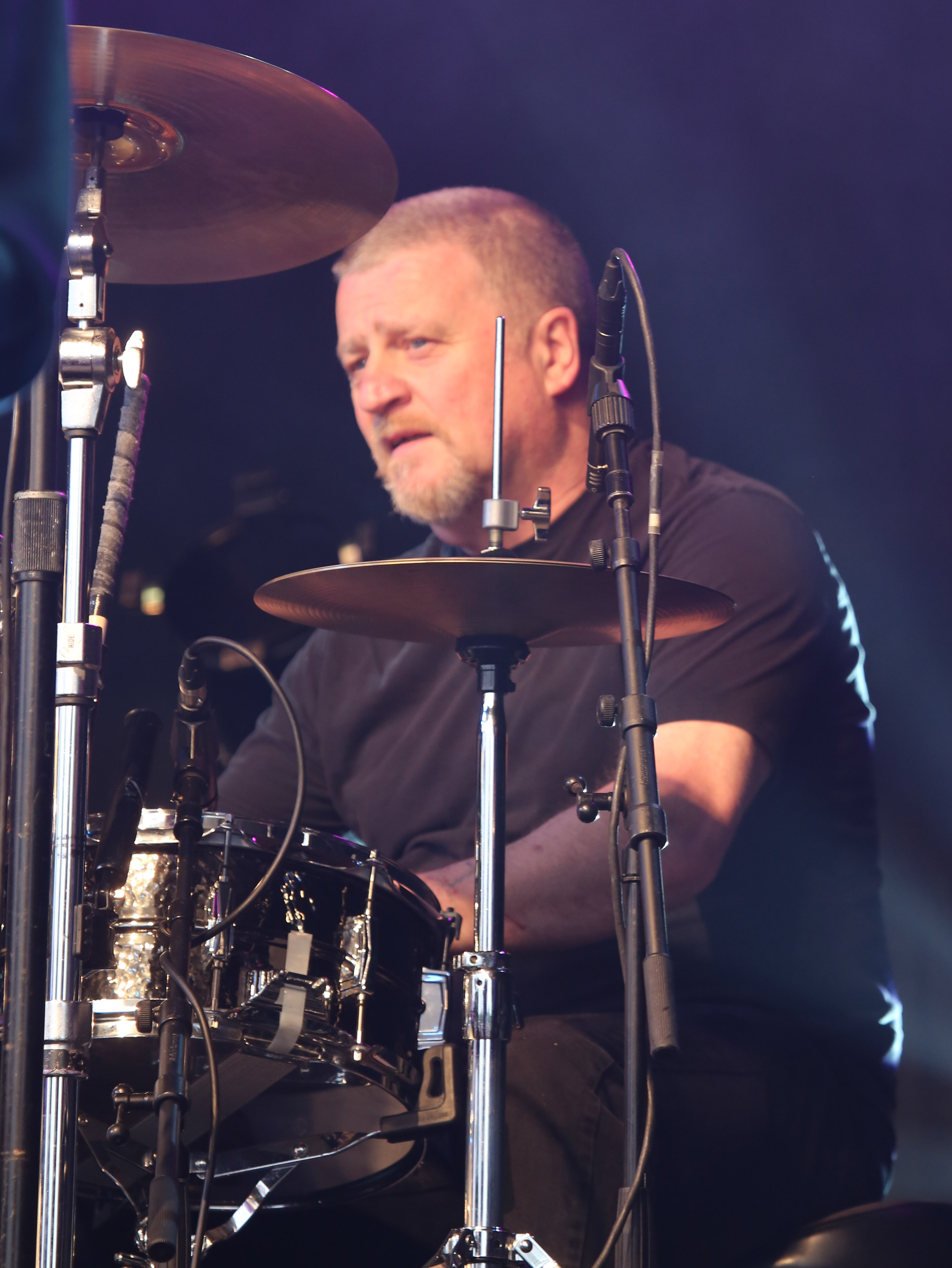
- Thompson performing with Lindisfarne in 2015

Background information
- Born: 13 May 1951 (age 75); Newcastle upon Tyne, England
- Genres: Glam rock; rock; art rock
- Occupation: Musician
- Instrument: Drums
- Years active: 1970–present
- Member of: Roxy Music; Andy Mackay's Metaphors
- Formerly of: Angelic Upstarts; Concrete Blonde; Lindisfarne
- Website: pauldrum.com

Paul Thompson (born 13 May 1951) is an English drummer, who is best known as a member of the rock band Roxy Music. He is a member of Andy Mackay's project with the Metaphors and joined Lindisfarne in 2013. He was also the drummer for Oi! band Angelic Upstarts and the American alternative rock band Concrete Blonde.

== Early life and education ==
Thompson was born in Newcastle upon Tyne, Northumberland. He lived in Jarrow, north-east England from the age of six months and attended West Simonside Infants and Junior School.

== Career ==
In 1965, Thompson joined The Tyme who played at local youth clubs. His next group was a local band called The Urge which he joined when 17 years old. Fatigue from performing with them seven nights a week in local clubs and pubs led him to fall asleep on his job as an apprentice metalworker, resulting in his dismissal. Alongside John Miles he became a member of The Influence.

Thompson joined Roxy Music in 1971 and was credited as drummer on six albums, as well as touring and performing on solo records with his bandmates Bryan Ferry, Phil Manzanera, and Andy Mackay.

In 1980, Thompson took leave from Roxy Music due to an arm injury. Later that year he left the band, owing to musical differences between himself and Bryan Ferry. Thompson was also a member of Concrete Blonde from 1989 until 1991, and again from 1993 until 1996, playing on their albums Bloodletting and Mexican Moon.

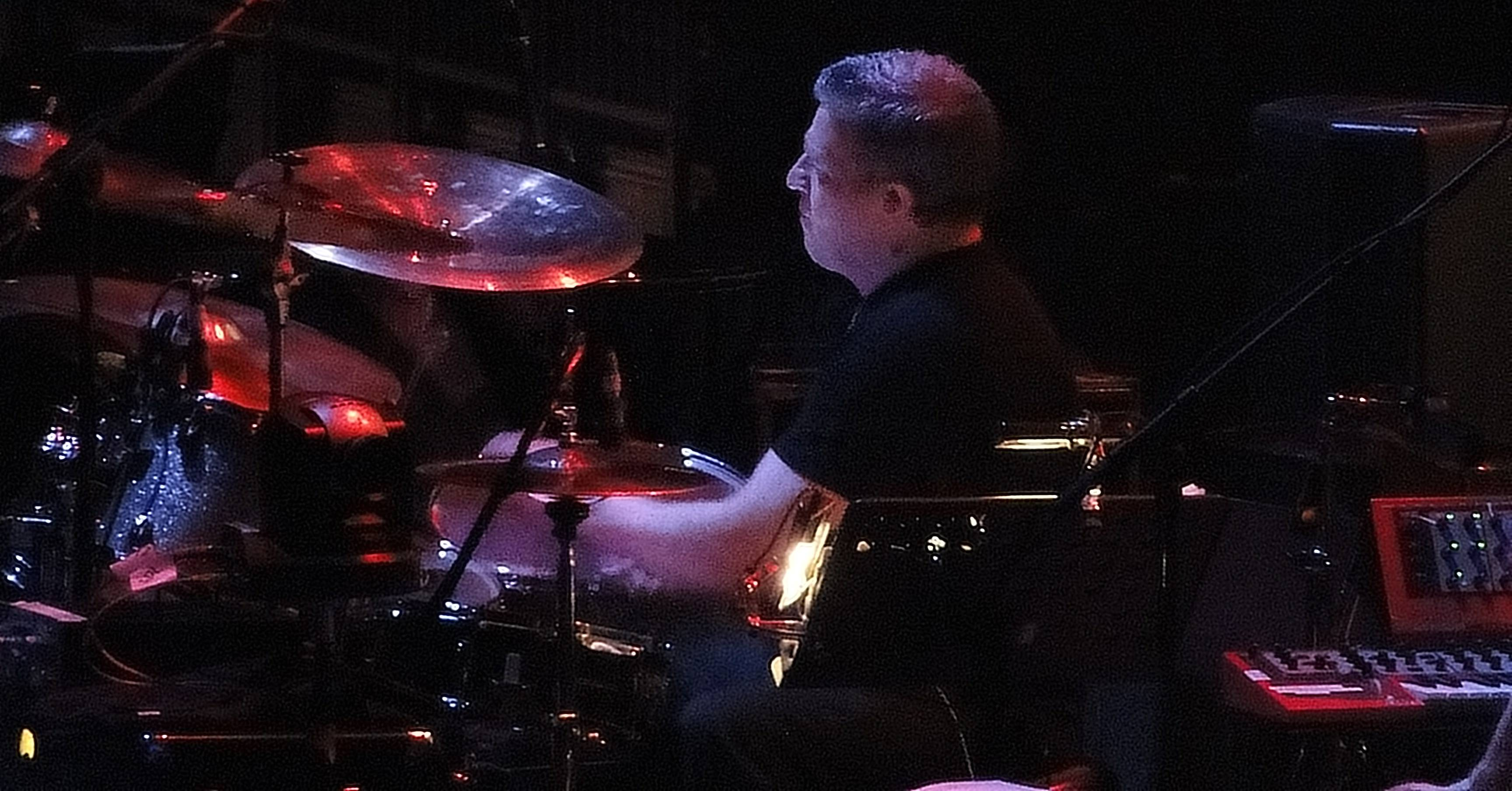
Thompson with Roxy Music in 2011

In 2001, he reunited with fellow Roxy Music band members for a tour. He also toured with Ferry, supporting his Frantic album in 2003 and appeared at the Isle of Wight Festival 2005 on 11 June 2005 with Ferry. During this period Thompson played live gigs with Andy Mackay and The Metaphors and was credited on their self released live CD London! Paris! New York! Rome! in 2009. He joined the Newcastle upon Tyne Lindisfarne in 2013.

Thompson was inducted into the Rock and Roll Hall of Fame in 2019 as a member of Roxy Music.

== Influence and following ==
Drummer Roger Taylor of the new wave band Duran Duran has stated that Thompson's drumming was a big influence over his development. Fans of Thompson nicknamed him "The Great Paul Thompson", because of his drumming skills. Paul Cook of The Sex Pistols is also a fan.
