= Andy Mackay =

British musician (born 1946)

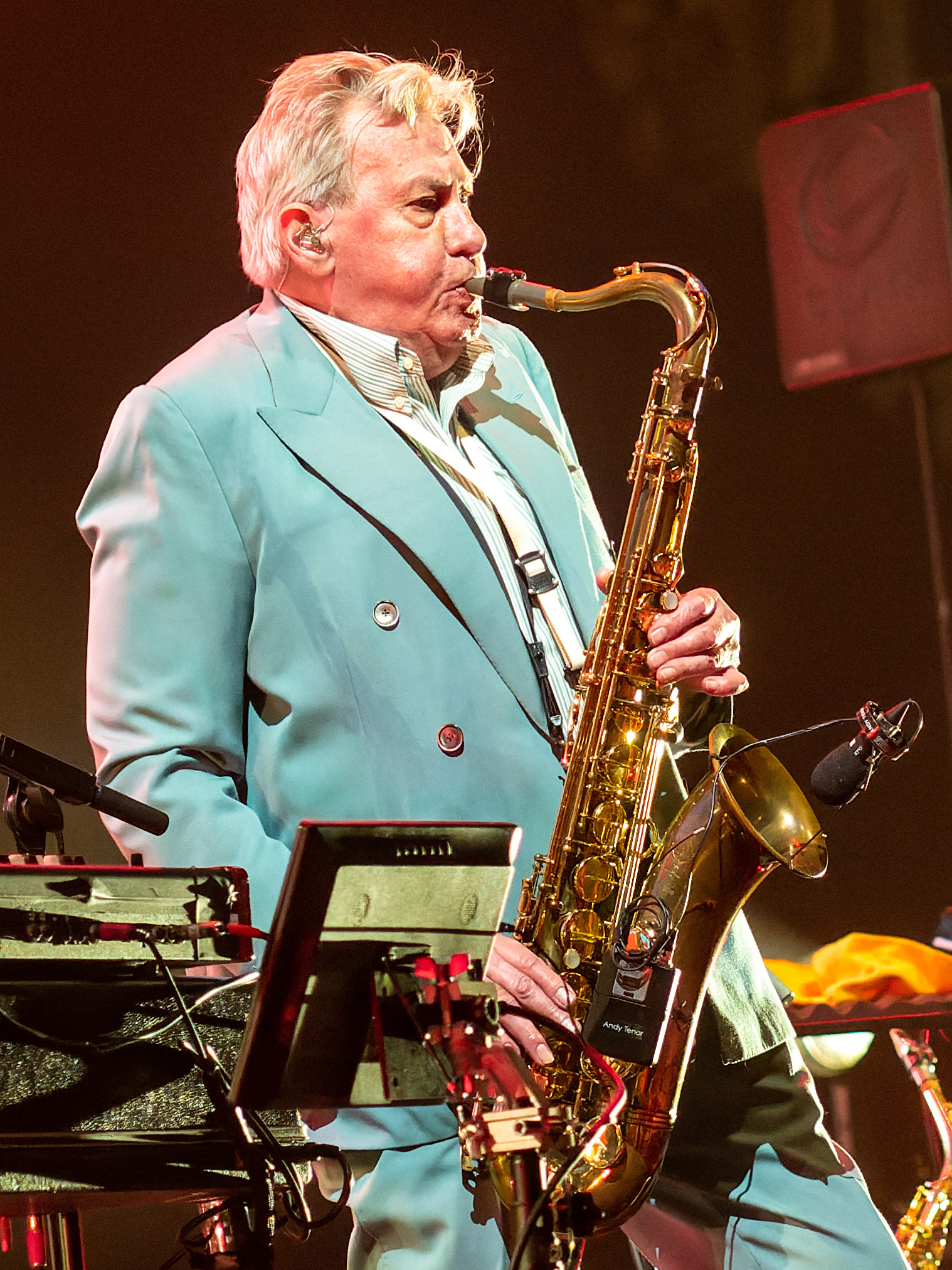
- Mackay performing in 2022

Background information
- Born: Andrew Mackay; 23 July 1946 (age 80); Lostwithiel, Cornwall, England
- Genres: Rock; glam rock; art rock; classical; R&B
- Occupations: Musician; songwriter; record producer; educator; author
- Instruments: Saxophone; oboe; keyboards
- Years active: 1971–present
- Labels: Island; Polydor; Virgin; Reprise; Warner Bros.; E.G.; ATCO
- Member of: Roxy Music
- Formerly of: The Explorers
- Website: andymackay.co.uk

Andrew Mackay (born 23 July 1946) is an English musician, best known as a founding member (playing oboe and saxophone) of the art rock group Roxy Music.

In addition, he has taught music and provided scores for television, while his work as a session musician ties him to various other musicians, such as the other members of Roxy.

== Life and career ==
Mackay was born on 23 July 1946 in Lostwithiel, Cornwall, England, and grew up in central London, attending Westminster City School where he was a chorister in the choir of St Margaret's, Westminster. A classically trained woodwind player, he studied music and English literature at the University of Reading. While at university, he played with a band called the Nova Express and, together with future Roxy Music publicist Simon Puxley, formed part of a performance art group called Sunshine. He also struck up a friendship with Winchester art student Brian Eno.

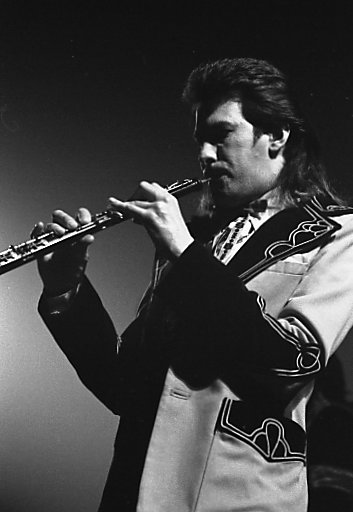
Mackay performing live in Toronto, Canada, 1974

In January 1971, Mackay became a member of the art rock band Roxy Music (formed November 1970) after answering a Melody Maker advertisement placed by singer Bryan Ferry; he soon brought Eno into the group to handle "Synthesiser and Tapes". Prior to signing with E.G. Management, Mackay taught music full-time at Holland Park School and part-time at Bishop Thomas Grant Catholic Comprehensive to support himself.

He played oboe and saxophone in Roxy Music, becoming known for his Chuck Berry-inspired duckwalk during saxophone solos, notably on the raucous track "Editions of You". With his pronounced quiff, Star Trek sideburns and Motown-inspired stage costumes, Mackay made a contribution to the unique Roxy Music "look"—which functioned as a retro-futurist throwback to 1950s rock-and-roll performers.

His songwriting credits for Roxy Music include the Top Five hits "Love Is the Drug" (1975) and "Angel Eyes" (1979), plus "A Song for Europe", "Three and Nine", "Bitter-Sweet", "Sentimental Fool", "While My Heart is Still Beating" and "Tara", together with the early experimental B-sides "The Numberer" and "The Pride and the Pain".

He released two instrumental solo studio albums in the 1970s: In Search of Eddie Riff (1974), an exploration of his musical roots, and Resolving Contradictions (1978), based on his impressions of a trip to China. Both albums featured guest appearances from Paul Thompson (drums) and Phil Manzanera (guitar) of Roxy Music. He also composed and produced the music for the hit television series Rock Follies and Rock Follies of '77, with lyrics by playwright and screenwriter Howard Schuman. Both series sired specially recorded soundtrack albums, the first of which reached number one in the UK Album Chart in March/April 1976. The second contained the single "OK?", which reached number ten on the UK Singles Chart in May/June 1977. Schuman and Mackay reunited in 1983 for the BBC one-off TV drama Video Stars, with Mackay again providing music. He appeared onscreen in cameo roles in both Schuman projects.

Mackay has also worked with Duran Duran, Mott the Hoople, John Cale, John Mellencamp, Mickey Jupp, Yukihiro Takahashi, Paul McCartney, Godley & Creme, Eddie and the Hot Rods, Tomoyasu Hotei, Arcadia and 801. He played saxophone on several tracks of Brian Eno's albums Here Come the Warm Jets and Taking Tiger Mountain (By Strategy), both released in 1974.

In 1981, his book Electronic Music: The Instruments, the Music & the Musicians was published by Phaidon.

After Roxy Music's dissolution in 1983, Mackay joined with Roxy guitarist Phil Manzanera to form the Explorers, featuring Bryan Ferry-soundalike James Wraith on lead vocals. The group released a self-titled album in 1985 and three years later resurfaced as Manzanera and Mackay. Under this name, they released a further two albums which combined new material with reissued tracks from the Explorers album.

From 1988 to 1991, Mackay largely abandoned music to take a three-year Bachelor of Divinity course at King's College London. During this time, he played on and produced a Christmas album with the Players, a group of English folk musicians.

He has written several themes for British television and radio, such as the memorable theme music for the late 1970s series Armchair Thriller and Hazell.

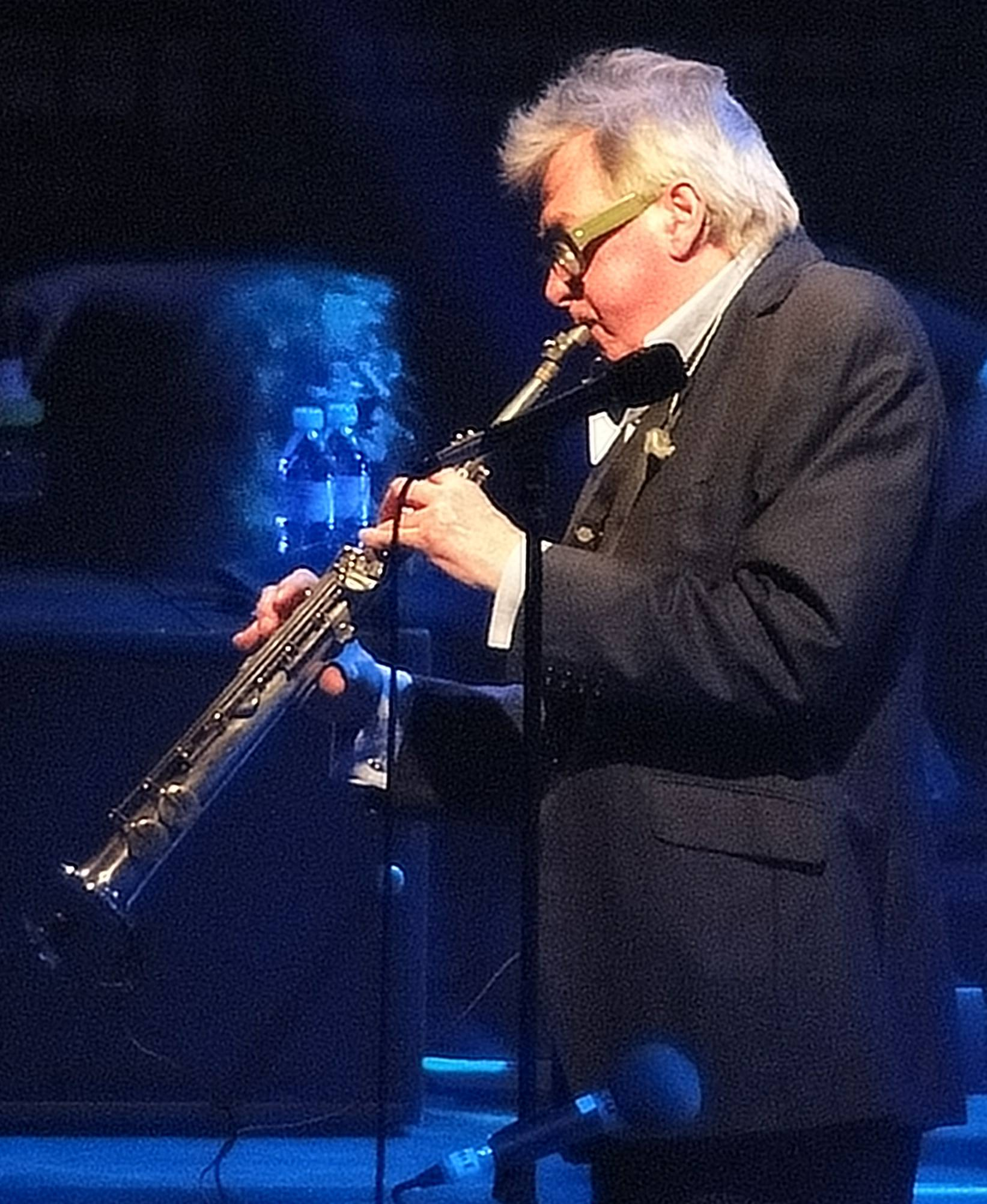
Mackay performing live with Roxy Music at the LG Arena in Solihull, 2011

With Ferry, Manzanera and Thompson, he took part in the Roxy Music reunion concerts of 2001, with further scattered live dates in 2003, 2005/6, 2011 and 2022 when Roxy Music celebrated their 50th anniversary.

In 2014, he became a founder member of Clive Langer's new band, the Clang Group, playing two dates in London in October 2014 and recording an EP for Domino.

2018 saw the completion of his setting of '3Psalms' which started as an experimental project in the mid-1990s, aiming to be a synthesis of Mackay's varied influences—from his classical training to his rock-and-roll, avant-garde electronica, and even his years as a boy chorister. Picking up in 2012, Mackay went back into the studio, scoring strings, choir, synthesisers, guitar and some other rock elements. Fellow Roxy musician Manzanera guested on both the album and the London concert premiering the work, which also featured orchestral reworkings of several Roxy Music tracks under the banner 'Roxymphony'.

== Personal life ==
Mackay married Lucinda Pugh in 1995. They have one child.

== Discography ==
Albums

- In Search of Eddie Riff (1974)
- Resolving Contradictions (1978)
- Music for the Senses (2004)
- London! New York! Paris! Rome! (with the Metaphors) (2009)
- 3Psalms (2018)

Singles

- "Ride of the Valkyries"/"Time Regained"* (1974)
- "Wild Weekend"*/"Walking the Whippet" (1975)

*non-album track

Other appearances

- "Bitter's End" (with Paul Kimble) (1998) for Velvet Goldmine
- "Music for French Horn and Drain" (with Phil Manzanera) (2023)

=== Band work ===
The Explorers/Manzanera and Mackay

- The Explorers (1985)
- Crack the Whip (Mackay & Manzanera) (1988)
- Up in Smoke (Mackay & Manzanera) (1989)
- Manzanera and Mackay (Mackay & Manzanera) (1991) (compilation)
- The Explorers Live at the Palace (1997)

Players

- Christmas (1989)

The Venus in Furs

- "Ladytron", "Baby's on Fire", "Bitter-Sweet", and "Tumbling Down" (1998) for Velvet Goldmine

=== Compositions ===
- Rock Follies (with Howard Schuman) (1976)
- Rock Follies of '77 (with Howard Schuman) (1977)

== Bibliography ==
- Rigby, Jonathan. Roxy Music: Both Ends Burning (Reynolds & Hearn, 2005; revised edition 2008) ISBN 1-903111-80-3
