= Bryan Ferry discography =

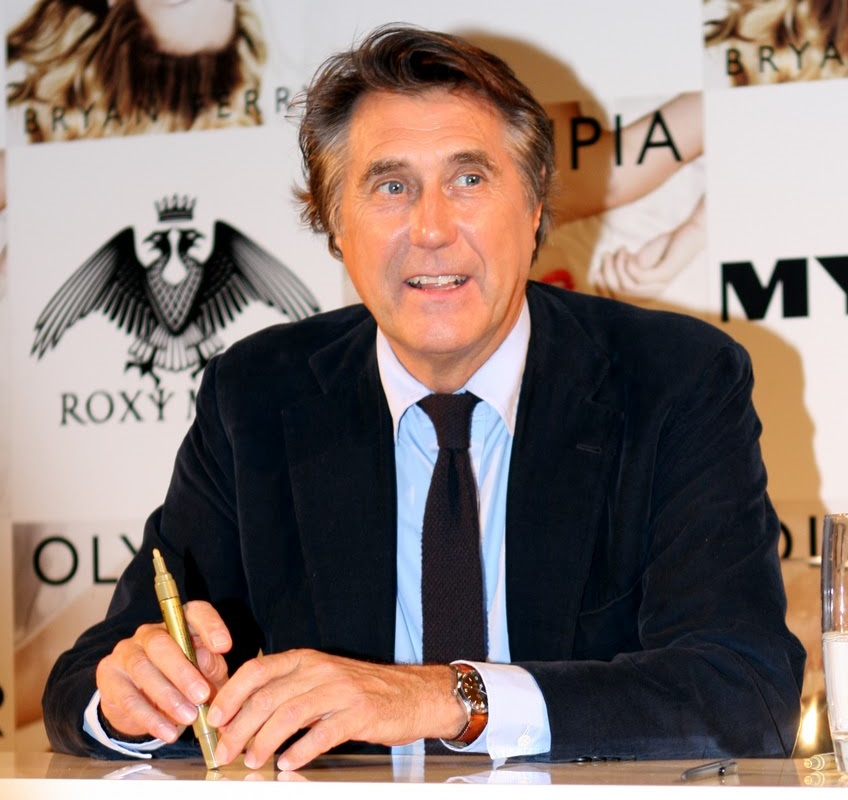
- Ferry in Sydney, Australia, 2011
- Studio albums: 17
- Extended plays: 2
- Live albums: 4
- Compilation albums: 6
- Singles: 45
- Video albums: 6
- Music videos: 40
- Remix albums: 2
- Box sets: 2

The following is the discography of the English singer and musician Bryan Ferry. For his discography as a member of Roxy Music, see Roxy Music discography.

== Albums ==
=== Studio albums ===
Title	Album details	Peak chart positions										Certifications
Title	Album details	UK	AUS	AUT	GER	NL	NOR	NZ	SWE	SWI	US	Certifications
These Foolish Things	Released: 5 October 1973; UK label: Island; US label: Atlantic; Formats: LP, MC, 8-track	5	18	—	—	10	—	—	16	—	204	UK: Gold
Another Time, Another Place	Released: 5 July 1974; UK label: Island; US label: Atlantic; Formats: LP, MC, 8-track	4	21	—	—	—	—	39	3	—	—	UK: Gold
Let's Stick Together	Released: 10 September 1976; UK label: Island; US label: Atlantic; Formats: LP, MC, 8-track	19	1	—	—	1	19	28	7	—	160	
In Your Mind	Released: February 1977; UK label: Polydor; US label: Atlantic; Formats: LP, MC, 8-track	5	2	17	—	8	12	16	4	—	126	UK: Gold
The Bride Stripped Bare	Released: September 1978; UK label: Polydor/E.G.; US label: Atlantic; Formats: LP, MC, 8-track	13	32	—	—	45	—	37	8	—	159	UK: Silver
Boys and Girls	Released: 3 June 1985; UK label: E.G.; US label: Warner Bros.; Formats: CD, LP, MC	1	13	15	9	4	3	3	4	9	63	UK: Platinum; NZ: Gold; US: Gold
Bête Noire	Released: 2 November 1987; UK label: Virgin; US label: Reprise; Formats: CD, LP, MC	9	20	—	21	15	10	11	6	21	63	UK: Gold
Taxi	Released: 10 March 1993; Label: Virgin; Formats: CD, LP, MC, MD	2	26	24	26	25	12	20	27	35	79	UK: Gold
Mamouna	Released: 31 August 1994; Label: Virgin; Formats: CD, LP, MC	11	75	33	38	59	12	45	16	—	94	
As Time Goes By	Released: 14 October 1999; Label: Virgin; Formats: CD, HDCD, MC	16	—	28	22	—	23	8	48	—	195	UK: Gold; NZ: Gold
Frantic	Released: 15 April 2002; Label: Virgin; Formats: CD, SACD, LP, MC	6	—	6	12	78	4	—	10	26	189	UK: Silver
Dylanesque	Released: 5 March 2007; Label: Virgin; Formats: CD, LP	5	—	18	18	15	19	20	5	50	117	UK: Silver
Olympia	Released: 25 October 2010; Label: Virgin; Formats: CD, 2xCD, LP, digital download	19	—	29	15	29	16	—	7	37	71	
The Jazz Age	Released: 26 November 2012; Label: BMG; Formats: CD, LP, digital download	50	—	—	91	94	—	—	34	—	—	
Avonmore	Released: 17 November 2014; Label: BMG; Formats: CD, LP, digital download	19	—	34	23	47	16	—	19	37	72	
Bitter-Sweet	Released: 30 November 2018; Label: BMG; Formats: CD, LP, digital download	60	—	28	46	193	—	—	—	80	—	
Loose Talk (with Amelia Barratt)	Released: 28 March 2025; Label: Dene Jesmond Records; Formats: CD, LP	—	—	—	—	—	—	—	—	—	—	
"—" denotes releases that did not chart or were not released in that territory.

=== Live albums ===
Title	Album details	Peak chart positions				
Title	Album details	UK	AUT	GER	NL	SCO
Live in Lyon	Released: 23 September 2013; Label: Eagle Vision; Formats: CD+DVD, CD+Blu-ray	—	—	—	—	—
Live 2015	Released: 15 April 2016; Label: BMG; Formats: 2xCD	—	—	—	—	—
Live at the Royal Albert Hall 1974	Released: 7 February 2020; Label: BMG; Formats: CD, LP, digital download	18	30	46	—	3
Royal Albert Hall 2020	Released: 2 April 2021; Label: Dene Jesmond; Formats: CD, 2xLP, digital download	18	—	—	72	5
"—" denotes releases that did not chart or were not released in that territory.

=== Remix albums ===
Title	Album details
Olympia Remixes	Released: 3 November 2011; Label: Virgin; Formats: digital download
Avonmore	Released: 19 August 2016; Label: BMG; Formats: digital download

=== Compilation albums ===
Title	Album details	Peak chart positions										Certifications
Title	Album details	UK	AUS	AUT	GER	NL	NOR	NZ	SWE	SWI	US	Certifications
Street Life: 20 Great Hits (Bryan Ferry and Roxy Music)	Released: 14 April 1986; UK label: E.G.; US label: Reprise; Formats: CD, 2xLP, MC	1	2	23	14	10	—	1	—	12	100	UK: Platinum; NZ: Platinum
The Ultimate Collection (Bryan Ferry and Roxy Music)	Released: 7 November 1988; Label: E.G.; Formats: CD, LP, MC	6	11	—	43	31	—	15	23	—	—	UK: 3× Platinum; AUS: 2× Platinum
More Than This: The Best of Bryan Ferry + Roxy Music (Bryan Ferry and Roxy Music)	Released: 30 October 1995; Label: Virgin; Formats: CD, 2xLP, MC	15	9	—	91	—	4	23	31	—	—	UK: Platinum
Slave to Love: Best of the Ballads (Bryan Ferry and Roxy Music)	Released: July 2000; Label: Virgin; Formats: CD, HDCD, MC, MD	11	—	—	16	—	17	35	10	88	—	UK: Gold
The Platinum Collection (Bryan Ferry and Roxy Music)	Released: 7 June 2004; Label: Virgin; Formats: 3xCD	17	—	—	—	41	—	—	—	—	—	UK: Gold
The Best of Bryan Ferry	Released: 23 November 2009; Label: Virgin; Formats: CD	95	—	—	—	—	—	—	—	—	—	
"—" denotes releases that did not chart or were not released in that territory.

=== Box sets ===
Title	Album details	Peak chart positions
Title	Album details	UK
The Island Singles 1973–1976	Released: 16 April 2016; Label: Universal Music; Formats: 6x7"	—
Retrospective	Released: 25 October 2024; Label: BMG; Formats: 5xCD	57

=== Video albums ===
Title	Album details
New Town	Released: March 1990; Label: Virgin Music Video; Formats: VHS, LD
Video Collection (Bryan Ferry and Roxy Music)	Released: October 1995; Label: Virgin; Formats: VHS, LD
Live in Paris	Released: February 2001; Label: Virgin; Formats: DVD
Dylanesque Live – The London Sessions	Released: 25 June 2007; Label: Eagle Vision; Formats: DVD
The Bête Noire Tour (reissue of New Town, first time on DVD)	Released: 27 October 2008; Label: Virgin; Formats: DVD
Live in Lyon	Released: 23 September 2013; Label: Eagle Vision; Formats: DVD, Blu-ray

== EPs ==
Title	EP details	Peak chart positions			
Title	EP details	UK	AUS	IRE	SWE
Extended Play	Released: 30 July 1976; Label: Island; Formats: 7"	7	9	12	11
Love Letters	Released: 20 May 2022; Label: BMG; Formats: digital download	—	—	—	—
"—" denotes releases that did not chart or were not released in that territory.

== Singles ==
Title	Year	Peak chart positions										Certifications	Album
Title	Year	UK	AUS	BE (FL)	CAN	GER	IRE	NL	NZ	SWE	US	Certifications	Album
"A Hard Rain's a-Gonna Fall"	1973	10	23	—	—	42	—	23	—	—	—		These Foolish Things
"I Love How You Love Me" (Note: "I Love How You Love Me" was only released as a single in France.)	1973	—	—	—	—	—	—	—	—	—	—		These Foolish Things
"The 'In' Crowd"	1974	13	83	—	—	—	—	—	—	—	—		Another Time, Another Place
"Smoke Gets in Your Eyes"	1974	17	99	—	—	—	—	—	—	—	—		Another Time, Another Place
"You Go to My Head"	1975	33	—	—	—	—	—	—	—	—	—		Let's Stick Together
"Let's Stick Together"	1976	4	1	5	—	47	5	3	—	15	—	UK: Silver; NZ: Gold	Let's Stick Together
"The Price of Love" (Note: "The Price of Love" was only released as a single in Benelux. It was released in the UK and Australasia as the lead track of the Extended Play EP.)	1976	—	9	7	—	—	—	5	—	—	—		Let's Stick Together
"Heart on My Sleeve" (Note: "Heart on My Sleeve" was only released as a single in the US. It was also included on the Extended Play EP.)	1976	—	—	—	—	—	—	—	—	—	86		Let's Stick Together
"This Is Tomorrow"	1977	9	6	24	—	—	—	14	—	14	—		In Your Mind
"Tokyo Joe"	1977	15	30	—	—	—	—	22	—	—	—		In Your Mind
"What Goes On"	1978	67	73	—	—	—	—	—	—	—	—		The Bride Stripped Bare
"Sign of the Times"	1978	37	—	—	—	—	—	—	—	—	—		The Bride Stripped Bare
"Carrickfergus"	1978	—	—	—	—	—	—	—	—	—	—		The Bride Stripped Bare
"Slave to Love"	1985	10	29	11	75	30	8	33	11	—	109	UK: Silver; NZ: Platinum	Boys and Girls
"Don't Stop the Dance"	1985	21	68	13	—	45	8	29	16	—	—		Boys and Girls
"Windswept"	1985	46	—	—	—	—	29	—	—	—	—		Boys and Girls
"Is Your Love Strong Enough?"	1986	22	—	—	97	—	14	—	—	—	—		Legend (soundtrack)
"Help Me" (Note: "Help Me" was only released as a single in the US and Canada; recorded for film The Fly)	1986	—	—	—	—	—	—	—	—	—	—		Non-album single
"The Right Stuff"	1987	37	23	36	—	—	—	43	18	—	—		Bête Noire
"Kiss and Tell"	1988	41	38	—	47	—	—	45	26	—	31		Bête Noire
"Limbo"	1988	86	—	—	—	—	—	—	—	—	—		Bête Noire
"Let's Stick Together '88"	1988	12	—	—	—	—	3	65	41	—	—		The Ultimate Collection
"The Price of Love '89"	1989	49	38	—	—	—	30	—	—	—	—		The Ultimate Collection
"He'll Have to Go"	1989	63	—	—	—	—	—	—	—	—	—		The Ultimate Collection
"I Put a Spell on You"	1993	18	68	25	35	53	—	39	35	—	—		Taxi
"Will You Love Me Tomorrow"	1993	23	127	—	—	79	—	—	—	—	—		Taxi
"Girl of My Best Friend"	1993	57	—	—	—	—	—	—	—	—	—		Taxi
"Your Painted Smile"	1994	52	—	—	—	—	—	—	—	—	—		Mamouna
"Mamouna"	1995	57	—	—	—	—	—	—	—	—	—		Mamouna
"Dance with Life (The Brilliant Light)" (Note: "Dance with Life (The Brilliant Light)" was only released as a single in Continental Europe and Australia. It was also released promotionally in the US.)	1996	—	—	—	—	92	—	—	—	—	—		Phenomenon (soundtrack)
"As Time Goes By"	1999	89	—	—	—	—	—	—	—	—	—		As Time Goes By
"It's All Over Now, Baby Blue"	2002	—	—	—	—	—	—	—	—	—	—		Frantic
"Goddess of Love"	2002	82	—	—	—	—	—	—	—	—	—		Frantic
"One Way Love"	2002	—	—	—	—	—	—	—	—	—	—		Frantic
"A Fool for Love"	2002	—	—	—	—	—	—	—	—	—	—		Frantic
"The Times They Are a-Changin'"	2007	—	—	—	—	—	—	—	—	—	—		Dylanesque
"Simple Twist of Fate"	2007	—	—	—	—	—	—	—	—	—	—		Dylanesque
"Positively 4th Street"	2007	—	—	—	—	—	—	—	—	—	—		Dylanesque
"You Can Dance"	2010	—	—	—	—	—	—	—	—	—	—		Olympia
"Shameless"	2010	—	—	—	—	—	—	—	—	—	—		Olympia
"Reason or Rhyme"	2010	—	—	—	—	—	—	—	—	—	—		Olympia
"Alphaville"	2011	—	—	—	—	—	—	—	—	—	—		Olympia
"Loop De Li"	2014	—	—	—	—	—	—	—	—	—	—		Avonmore
"—" denotes releases that did not chart or were not released in that territory.

=== Featured singles ===
Title	Year	Artist	Album
"U Can Dance" (Note: "U Can Dance" was only released as a single in Continental Europe.)	2010	Hell	Teufelswerk (DJ Hell album)
"Johnny and Mary"	2014	Todd Terje	It's Album Time (Todd Terje album)

== Other appearances ==
=== Studio ===
Year	Title	Album	Notes
1976	"She's Leaving Home"	All This and World War II	Beatles cover
1986	"Is Your Love Strong Enough?"	Legend	original
1988	"Crazy Love"	She's Having A Baby soundtrack	Van Morrison cover
1992	"Are You Lonesome Tonight"	Honeymoon in Vegas soundtrack	Lou Handman & Roy Turk cover
1996	"Dance with Life (The Brilliant Light)"	Phenomenon	Bernie Taupin & Martin Page cover
1997	"Shakespeare's Sonnet No. 18"	Diana, Princess of Wales: Tribute	William Shakespeare adaptation
1998	"I'll See You Again"	Twentieth-Century Blues: The Songs of Noël Coward	Noël Coward cover
2000	"Mother of Pearl"	Ordinary Decent Criminal	Roxy Music cover
2001	"Don't Be Cruel"	Good Rockin' Tonight: The Legacy of Sun Records	Otis Blackwell cover
2001	"The Lambton Worm"	From Tees to Tyne	Traditional
2006	"The Cruel Ship's Captain" and "Lowlands Low"	Rogue's Gallery: Pirate Ballads, Sea Songs, and Chanteys	Traditional
2012	"Bob Dylan's Dream"	Chimes of Freedom: The Songs of Bob Dylan	Bob Dylan cover

=== Guest ===
Year	Title	Album	Artist
2010	"Shameless"	Black Light	Groove Armada
