= Oliver Thompson =

- Born: Oliver Forrest Thompson; 22 March 1988 (age 38); Swanage, England
- Occupation: Musician
- Publisher: Ollie Forrest

Oliver Thompson (born 22 March 1988) is an English guitar player, songwriter and singer. He has toured with Roxy Music and Bryan Ferry since 2005, playing with guitarists including Phil Manzanera, Chris Spedding and Johnny Marr. He has played on Ferry's solo tours, festival dates and recording projects since he began working with him at age 17.

He played on Ferry's 2007 solo album Dylanesque and was the principal guitarist on the 2010 Olympia, which also featured David Gilmour, Nile Rodgers, Jonny Greenwood and Phil Manzanera. He toured with The Bryan Ferry Orchestra in 2013 for The Jazz Age. When asked in a 2013 interview about his favorite guitarists to work with, Ferry said,

In recent years, there has been my young guitarist Oliver Thompson ... also Nile Rodgers ... Neil Hubbard, Waddy Wachtel, Phil Manzanera, John Porter, David Gilmour, Mark Knopfler and Johnny Marr ... all of whom have played wonderful things on my records.

Thompson was given his first guitar at 13 and soon started playing in his first band White Vinyl (2003–2007). He then started the band Rubber Kiss Goodbye (2008–2011) where he was the singer, songwriter and guitarist. The latter also included Bryan Ferry's son Tara Ferry on drums and Peter Perrett Jr. (previously of the band Babyshambles) on bass. Festival appearances for Rubber Kiss Goodbye included the 2009 SXSW in Austin, Texas, The Great Escape Festival (2010) in Brighton, England, and the Lodestar Festival in Cambridgeshire, England (2011).

In 2013, he started his first solo project, under his first two names Ollie Forrest. He launched his first single in London on 20 June 2014, featuring the songs "Gun To Your Baby" and "Wild's Rent".

From 2015 he has been in a band called Ultraviolet. They've released three songs over as many years. Fire (2015), Without a Care (2016) and Stars (2017).

== Bryan Ferry studio albums ==
- Dylanesque (2007)
- Olympia (2010)
- Avonmore (2014)
