= Frank Ricotti =

English jazz vibraphonist and percussionist (born 1949)

- Born: Frank E. Ricotti; 31 January 1949 (age 77); St Pancras, London, England
- Genre: Jazz
- Occupation: Musician
- Instruments: Vibraphone; percussion

Frank E. Ricotti (born 31 January 1949) is an English jazz vibraphonist and percussionist.

== Early life and education ==
Frank E. Ricotti was born in St Pancras, London, England; his father was a drummer. Bill Ashton, founder of the National Youth Jazz Orchestra (NYJO), was an early mentor. As a teenager, Ricotti played vibraphone and learned composition and arranging in NYJO, and later attended Trinity College of Music between 1967 and 1970.

== Career ==
Ricotti worked with Neil Ardley (1968–71), Dave Gelly, Graham Collier, Mike Gibbs (1969–72), Stan Tracey (1970), Harry Beckett (1970–72), Norma Winstone (1971), Gordon Beck (1973–74), and Hans Zimmer.

In the late 1960s and early 1970s, Ricotti led his own jazz quartet. A line-up of the band featuring the guitarist Chris Spedding, bassist Chris Laurence and drummer Bryan Spring recorded the album Our Point of View, released in July 1969. In 1971, in partnership with bassist Mike de Albuquerque, he released the album First Wind, as Ricotti and Albuquerque.

In the 1980s he played with Chris Laurence and John Taylor in the group Paragonne, and played with Beck again in 1984. After this he worked primarily as a studio musician.

Ricotti has recorded with artists such as Status Quo, Freddie Mercury, Pet Shop Boys, Swing Out Sister, Art of Noise, The Style Council, Belle and Sebastian, Clannad, Barclay James Harvest, Meat Loaf, Elkie Brooks, Rick Wakeman, Oasis, Tina Turner, Aztec Camera, Thomas Anders, Alphaville, and Mark Knopfler.

Between 1984 and 1987, Ricotti wrote the soundtrack music for Yorkshire Television's The Beiderbecke Trilogy, in the style of Bix Beiderbecke. The music was performed by his band, the Frank Ricotti All Stars, and featured Kenny Baker on cornet. A soundtrack album was released in 1988. Later, in June 1993, it peaked at No. 73 in the UK Albums Chart. Ricotti and his band made a cameo appearance in the final series, playing in a jazz club.

In 2007 Ricotti played vibes on Mark Knopfler's album, Kill to Get Crimson.

== Discography ==
Lo and Behold
An audio sample of "Lo and Behold", from the 1971 album First Wind

=== As leader ===
- Our Point of View (CBS Realm Jazz: 52668, 1969)
- First Wind (Ricotti & Albuquerque), with Mike de Albuquerque, (Pegasus: PEG 2, 1971)

=== As sideman ===
With Alphaville

- Afternoons in Utopia (Atlantic, 1986)

With Thomas Anders

- Different (Teldec, 1989)

With Aztec Camera

- Knife (Sire, 1984)

With Madeline Bell

- This is One Girl (Pyre Records, 1976)
- Madeline (Four Corners, 1993)

With Blood, Sweat & Tears

- No Sweat (Columbia, 1973)

With Bloodstone

- Unreal (London, 1973)
- I Need Time (London, 1974)

With Blue Zone

- Big Thing (Arista, 1988)

With Teresa Brewer

- Teresa Brewer In London (Flying Dutchman, 1973)

With Dee Dee Bridgewater

- Dear Ella (Verve, 1997)

With Elkie Brooks

- Pearls II (A&M Records, 1982)

With Emma Bunton

- Free Me (19, 2004)

With Paul Carrack

- One Good Reason (Chrysalis Records, 1987)
- Blue Views (I.R.S. Records, 1995)
- These Days (Carrack UK, 2018)

With Mary Chapin Carpenter

- Songs from the Movie (Zoe, 2014)

With Tina Charles

- Heart 'n' Soul (CBS, 1977)

With Charlotte Church

- Enchantment (Columbia Records, 2001)

With Climie Fisher

- Everything (EMI, 1988)

With Rosemary Clooney

- Nice to be Around (United Artists Records, 1977)

With Stephen Dale Petit

- The Crave (English Records, 2011)

With Roger Daltrey

- McVicar (Polydor Records, 1980)

With Kiki Dee

- Perfect Timing (RCA Victor, 1981)

With Terence Trent D'Arby

- Introducing the Hardline According to Terence Trent D'Arby (Columbia Records, 1987)

With Sheena Easton

- Take My Time (EMI, 1981)
- You Could Have Been with Me (EMI, 1981)
- Madness, Money & Music (EMI, 1982)

With Everything but the Girl

- Baby, the Stars Shine Bright (Blanco y Negro, 1986)

With Bryan Ferry

- As Time Goes By (Virgin Records, 1999)
- Frantic (Virgin Records, 2002)
- Dylanesque (Virgin Records, 2007)
- Olympia (Virgin Records, 2010)
- The Jazz Age (BMG Rights Management, 2012)
- Avonmore (BMG Rights Management, 2014)
- Bitter-Sweet (BMG Rights Management, 2018)

With Julia Fordham

- Swept (Virgin Records, 1991)

With Peter Frampton

- Wind of Change (A&M Records, 1972)

With Gabrielle

- Always (Universal, 2007)

With Gareth Gates

- What My Heart Wants to Say (RCA Records, 2002)
- Go Your Own Way (RCA Records, 2003)

With Gibson Brothers

- Emily (Clever, 1984)

With Clive Griffin

- Clive Griffin (Epic Records, 1993)

With Delta Goodrem

- Mistaken Identity (Epic Records, 2004)

With David Gray

- Life in Slow Motion (Atlantic Records, 2005)

With Josh Groban

- Awake (Reprise Records, 2006)
- Bridges (Reprise Records, 2018)

With Daryl Hall

- Soul Alone (Epic, 1993)

With Geri Halliwell

- Passion (EMI, 2005)

With Albert Hammond

- Albert Louis Hammond (Epic Records, 1978)

With Debbie Harry

- Debravation (Sire Records, 1993)

With Johnny Hates Jazz

- Turn Back the Clock (Virgin, 1988)
- Tall Stories (Virgin, 1991)
- Magnetized (InterAction, 2013)

With Murray Head

- Nigel Lived (Columbia Records, 1972)

With John Illsley

- Glass (Vertigo, 1988)

With Yusuf Islam

- King of a Land (Dark Horse, 2023)

With Elton John

- Ice on Fire (Geffen, 1985)
- Leather Jackets (Geffen, 1986)

With Grace Jones

- Slave to the Rhythm (Island Records, 1985)

With Joshua Kadison

- Painted Desert Serenade (Capitol Records, 1993)

With Nick Kamen

- Us (WEA, 1988)

With Katrina and the Waves

- Turnaround (Polydor Records, 1994)

With Beverley Knight

- Affirmation (Parlophone, 2004)

With Mark Knopfler

- Sailing to Philadelphia (Warner Bros. Records, 2000)
- Kill to Get Crimson (Warner Bros. Records, 2007)

With Nick Lachey

- SoulO (Universal, 2003)

With Lighthouse Family

- Ocean Drive (Polydor, 1995)

With Meat Loaf

- Bad Attitude (Arista, 1984)

With Freddie Mercury and Montserrat Caballé

- Barcelona (Polydor Records, 1988)

With Mika

- The Origin of Love (Casablanca Records, 2012)

With John Miles

- Play On (EMI, 1983)

With Joni Mitchell

- Both Sides Now (Reprise Records, 2000)

With Oliver Nelson

- Oliver Edward Nelson in London with Oily Rags (Flying Dutchman, 1974)

With Robbie Nevil

- Robbie Nevil (Manhattan, 1986)

With Chris Norman

- Different Shades (Hansa, 1987)

With Sally Oldfield

- Water Bearer (Bronze Records, 1978)
- Easy (Bronze Records, 1979)
- Celebration (Bronze Records, 1980)
- Playing in the Flame (Bronze Records, 1981)
- Strange Day in Berlin (Bronze, 1983)

With The Overtones

- Higher (Warner Bros., 2012)

With Pet Shop Boys

- Very (Parlophone, 1993)
- Fundamental (Parlophone, 2006)

With Anthony Phillips

- Sides (Arista, 1979)

With Fayette Pinkney

- One Degree (Chopper, 1979)

With Michel Polnareff

- Bulles (AZ, 1981)

With Gregory Porter

- Nat King Cole & Me (Blue Note, 2017)

With Gerry Rafferty

- Night Owl (United Artists Records, 1979)
- Snakes and Ladders (United Artists Records, 1980)
- Sleepwalking (Liberty Records, 1982)

With Chris Rea

- Whatever Happened to Benny Santini? (Magnet, 1978)

With Cliff Richard

- Every Face Tells a Story (EMI, 1977)
- Together with Cliff Richard (EMI, 1991)

With Rumer

- Boys Don't Cry (Atlantic, 2012)

With Leo Sayer

- Have You Ever Been in Love (Chrysalis Records, 1983)

With Seal

- Soul 2 (Reprise Records, 2011)

With Chris Spedding

- Backwood Progression (Harvest, 1970)

With Edwin Starr

- Edwin Starr (20th Century Records, 1977)

With Status Quo

- Rockin' All Over the World (Vertigo, 1977)
- If You Can't Stand the Heat... (Vertigo, 1978)

With Amii Stewart

- Time for Fantasy (RCA Records, 1988)

With Rod Stewart

- A Spanner in the Works (Warner Bros. Records, 1995)

With Bill Tarmey

- A Gift of Love (EMI, 1993)
- Time for Love (EMI, 1994)

With Tina Turner

- Private Dancer (Capitol Records, 1984)
- Break Every Rule (Capitol Records, 1986)

With Uriah Heep

- Head First (Bronze, 1983)
- Raging Silence (Legacy, 1989)

With Rick Wakeman

- The Six Wives of Henry VIII (A&M, 1973)
- Rick Wakeman's Criminal Record (A&M, 1977)
- 1984 (Charisma, 1981)

With Was (Not Was)

- What Up, Dog? (Chrysalis, 1988)

With Wet Wet Wet

- 10 (Mercury, 1997)

With Robbie Williams

- Swing When You're Winning (Chrysalis Records, 2001)
- Swings Both Ways (Island Records, 2013)

With Amy Winehouse

- Back to Black (Universal, 2006)
