= Goddess of Love =

Goddess of Love may refer to:

- Female deities of love in various cultures
- Goddess of Love (album), an album by Phyllis Hyman
- Goddess of Love (film), a 1988 American fantasy film
- "Goddess of Love", a song by Orchestral Manoeuvres in the Dark from the album The Pacific Age
- "Goddess of Love", single Bryan Ferry discography 2002

== See also ==
- God of Love
