= Jacob Quistgaard =

Danish guitarist

Quist
- Origin: Copenhagen, Denmark
- Genres: Blues, Jazz, Lofi Hip Hop, Rock, Art Rock, Hip Hop, RnB, Instrumental
- Occupations: Musician, Guitarist, Composer, Producer
- Labels: Lofi Blue Records, College Music, Chilled Cow, Lofi Records, Lofi Jazz Records, FretMonkey Records, MeriTone Music
- Website: www.quistorama.com

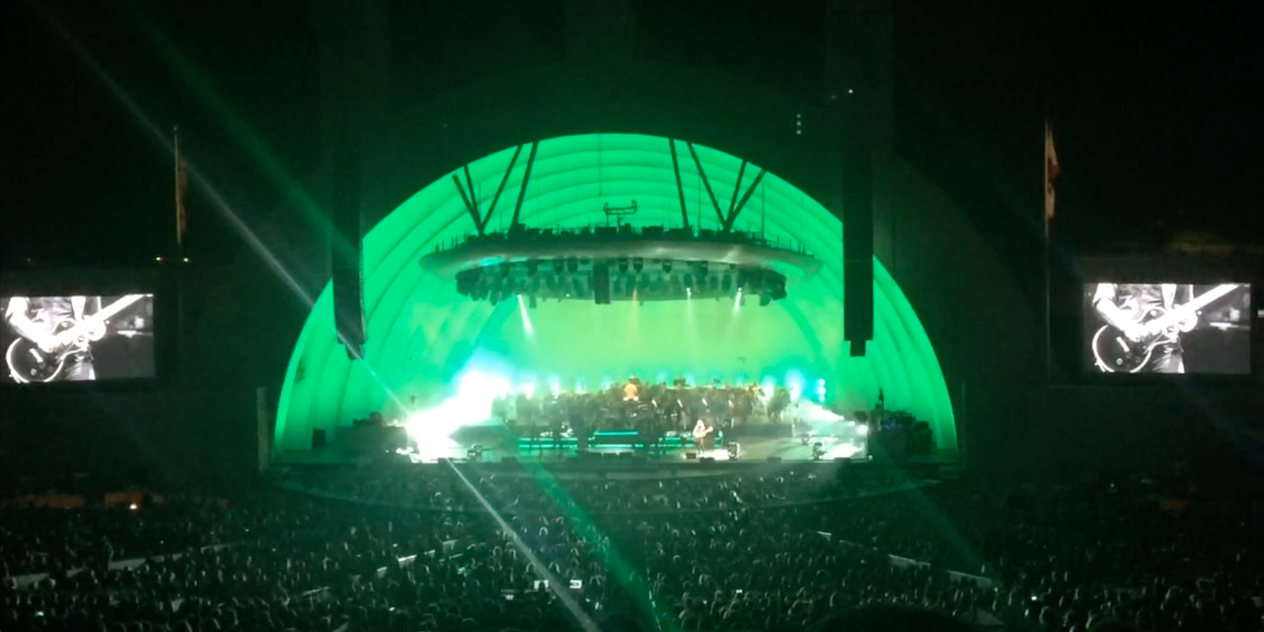
Quist performing at the Hollywood Bowl with Bryan Ferry and the Hollywood Bowl Orchestra. August 2017.

Jacob Quistgaard is a Danish guitarist, producer, and composer known as Quist. He is based in Los Angeles. Since 2020, Quist has become popular as an artist & producer of lofi music. His music has been featured on major playlists, including Lofi Girl, and has been used on television soundtracks.

Quist has also played as the lead guitarist of Roxy music and has been touring with the band's frontman, Bryan Ferry, since 2014. Quist featured on Ferry's 2014 album Avonmore. Other recording credits include British X-factor winners Little Mix, Stooshe, and Valerie June. Quist has also performed with Jazz musician Jamie Cullum, bass player T.M. Stevens, Alison Moyet, Waddy Wachtel, and Dutch singer Boris Titulaer.

Quist is also known for his YouTube channel, Quist, which mainly features his original music, improvisations, tour vlogs and a collection of original "jam tracks" and backing tracks. The channel also showcases other notable musicians, including Alice Cooper lead guitarist Nita Strauss and Pink Floyd session bass player Guy Pratt.

== Biography ==
Quist was born in Copenhagen, Denmark. He started playing guitar at age 6. As a young child, he studied and toured internationally with the Royal Danish Ballet. He moved to London, England as a teenager to study guitar at the Guitar Institute of Technology where he earned the title "Guitarist of the Year". He was then awarded a scholarship to study Jazz Performance at London's Royal Academy of Music. He had his professional recording debut with Danish act Franka & The Iris Band, which earned the artist a Danish Music Award.

In 2011 he published his first book with Parragon, Rock Guitar, which was a worldwide, multi-language release. Quist also collaborated with fellow BIMM faculty member and session guitarist Les Davidson on a second published book The Guitarist's Ultimate Chart Reading Book. Quist was a regular contributor to UK magazine Guitar Techniques. 'She #Zen' the first single from Quist's instrumental album 'Trigger', had an exclusive premiere on Guitar World.

== Discography ==
=== Albums ===
Title	Album details
Garden Beats (Quist Album)	Released: 2023; Label: Lofi Blue Records; Format: Album
Breathing Space (Quist Album)	Released: 2022; Label: Sonder House; Format: Album
Lofi Christmas (Quist Album)	Released: 2021; Label: Lofi Blue Records; Format: Album, CD
A Love of Water (Quist Album)	Released: 2021; Label: College Music Records; Format: Album, CD
Loop Improvisations, Vol. 1	Released: 2020; Label: MeriTone Music; Format: Album, CD
Trigger (Quist Album)	Released: 2017; Label: Fretmonkey Records; Format: Album, CD

=== Guest appearances ===
Year	Artist	Album
2014	Bryan Ferry	Avonmore (album)
