= State of the Nation (Industry song) =

- German cover of "State of the Nation".

Single by Industry

from the album Stranger to Stranger
- B-side: "Communication"
- Released: 1984
- Recorded: 1983
- Genre: New wave
- Length: 3:27 (single version); 4:33 (album version)
- Label: Capitol Records
- Songwriters: Jon Carin; Mercury Caronia
- Producer: Rhett Davies

"State of the Nation" is a song by American band Industry taken from their sole studio album Stranger to Stranger. The song peaked at No. 3 in Italy, No. 10 in Sweden, No. 78 in Australia, and No. 81 on the U.S. Billboard Hot 100 chart.

== Music video ==
The official music video was filmed on a retired aircraft carrier, the USS Intrepid, for two nights at the cost of $37,000. To create the appearance of an ominous stage set, the production installed blue and white lights, red emergency flares and billows of smoke on the Intrepid. Retired and active U.S. Navy personnel, who managed the Intrepid, also participated in the shoot. Half Hollow Hills East High School students were also brought in to act as naval personnel. During the shoot, the students wore their own uniforms. The production company later gave a $1,000 contribution to the school.

In the video, the band performs the song on a naval ship at night while being surrounded by uniformed naval personnel and a military/naval band, all of whom dance to the song. Parked aircraft are also evident in the video. The lead singer, Jon Carin, has a rack of keyboard instruments with a synthesizer and a computer (not a Fairlight CMI), Rudy Perrone plays a Steinberger bass guitar, Brian Unger plays a Fender Stratocaster and Mercury Caronia plays an acoustic drum kit with Simmons hexapads.

An alternate version, not set on a ship, was later filmed and released.

== Personnel ==
Industry

- Jon Carin – lead vocals and backing vocals, synthesizers and vocoder
- Brian Unger – electric guitar and backing vocals
- Rudy Perrone – bass
- Mercury Caronia – drum machine

== Charts ==
Chart (1984)	Peak position
Australia (Kent Music Report)	78
Italy (Hit Parade)	3
Sweden (Sverigetopplistan)	10
US Billboard Hot 100	81
