= Tokyo Joe (Bryan Ferry song) =

Single by Bryan Ferry

from the album In Your Mind
- B-side: "She's Leaving Home"
- Released: May 1977
- Recorded: 1977
- Studio: AIR (London)
- Genre: Rock; glam rock; pop rock; disco
- Label: Polydor
- Songwriter(s): Bryan Ferry
- Producer(s): Bryan Ferry; Steve Nye

Bryan Ferry singles chronology
"This Is Tomorrow" (1977)	"Tokyo Joe" (1977)	"What Goes On" (1978)

Tokyo Joe is a song by Bryan Ferry, the lead vocalist for Roxy Music. It was released as the second single from his fourth solo studio album and the first consisting entirely of original songs, In Your Mind, in May 1977, being Ferry's eleventh single. The single features the non-album track, "She's Leaving Home" as the B-side, which was originally recorded for the Beatles tribute album All This and World War II (1976).

== Background ==
"Tokyo Joe", is about Ferry's fascination with cinema, it celebrates 'femme-fatale', inspired by the song "Shanghai Lil" sung by James Cagney in the Hollywood musical, Shanghai Express released in 1932.

== Personnel ==
- Bryan Ferry – lead vocals, keyboards
- Chris Spedding – lead guitar
- Paul Thompson – drums
- John Wetton – bass guitar
- David Skinner – piano, keyboards
- Ann O'Dell – strings arrangements

== Certifications ==
Region	Certification	Certified units/sales
Japan (RIAJ) 1997 release	Platinum	100,000^{^}
^{^} Shipments figures based on certification alone.
