= Olympia (Bryan Ferry album) =

Studio album by Bryan Ferry
- Released: 25 October 2010
- Studio: Studio One (Olympia, London); 4th Street Recording (Santa Monica, California) (Note: Additional recording)
- Genre: Sophisti-pop
- Length: 49:18
- Label: Virgin
- Producer: Bryan Ferry; Rhett Davies; Johnson Somerset

Bryan Ferry chronology
Dylanesque (2007)	Olympia (2010)	The Jazz Age (2012)

Professional ratings
Review scores
Source	Rating
AllMusic	4/5 stars
The A.V. Club	B
Clash	7/10
Entertainment Weekly	B+
Mojo	3/5 stars
Pitchfork Media	7.5/10
PopMatters	8/10
Rolling Stone	3.5/5 stars
Slant Magazine	3/5 stars
Spin	7/10 stars

Olympia is the thirteenth studio album by the English singer Bryan Ferry, released on 25 October 2010 by Virgin Records. Co-produced by Ferry and Rhett Davies, Olympia is Ferry's first album of predominantly original material since 2002's Frantic.

The album features a wide range of contributors, including co-songwriter David A. Stewart of Eurythmics, Brian Eno, Phil Manzanera and Andy Mackay of Roxy Music, the electronic group Groove Armada, David Gilmour, Marcus Miller, Scissor Sisters, Nile Rodgers, Jonny Greenwood of Radiohead, Steve Nieve, and Flea. Early in the recording process Olympia was developed as a Roxy Music project, the first since the band's 1982 album Avalon, with participation from numerous guests. However, despite the presence of other Roxy Music members at the sessions, it was released as a Bryan Ferry solo project.

The album peaked at number 19 on the UK Albums Chart.

== Background ==
The album features some songs previously recorded by Ferry in collaborations with other artists. "You Can Dance", a version of which appeared as "U Can Dance" on DJ Hell's 2009 album Teufelswerk, is the record's first single. A version of "Shameless" previously appeared as a collaboration with Groove Armada on their album Black Light earlier in 2010. The album also features covers of Tim Buckley's "Song to the Siren" and Traffic's "No Face, No Name, No Number." The album came out in three versions: a standard edition with 10 songs, the "Deluxe Edition" containing two additional tracks and a DVD featuring "The Making of Olympia" documentary and a promo video for the song "You Can Dance", and the "Collector's Edition" with the 12 tracks and DVD from the Deluxe Edition as well as a second CD containing remixes and a 40-page hardback book.

In 2011 the single "Alphaville" was sent to a number of radio stations and appeared on BBC Radio 2's playlist and 106.9FM WHCR's

The album art features the fashion model Kate Moss and refers to the Édouard Manet 1863 painting of the same name.

== Critical reception ==
Reviewing for AllMusic, Stephen Thomas Erlewine wrote of the album "Such command of mood is a tell-tale sign of a quiet perfectionist, but Olympia doesn't feel fussy; it's unruffled and casually elegant, its pleasing familiarity reflecting the persistence of an old master honing his craft." And reviewing for Rolling Stone, Jon Dolan wrote of the album "Ferry could do a record with the Star Wars cantina band and it would come out pretty much the same: a bunch of lush, languorous Euro-glam ballads about love's labour's lost, all of them slathered in a sexy-vampire croon that makes lines about being 'faithfully entwined in a shameless world' seem like some deep shit."

== Track listing ==
No.	Title	Writer(s)	Length
1.	"You Can Dance"	Bryan Ferry, David A. Stewart	4:29
2.	"Alphaville"	Ferry, Stewart	4:25
3.	"Heartache by Numbers"	Ferry, Jason Sellards, Scott Hoffman	4:56
4.	"Me Oh My"	Ferry	4:30
5.	"Shameless"	Ferry, Andy Cato, Tom Findlay	4:36
6.	"Song to the Siren"	Tim Buckley, Larry Beckett	5:56
7.	"No Face, No Name, No Number"	Jim Capaldi, Steve Winwood	4:40
8.	"BF Bass (Ode to Olympia)"	Ferry, Phil Manzanera	4:09
9.	"Reason or Rhyme"	Ferry	6:52
10.	"Tender Is the Night"	Ferry, Stewart	4:35

Deluxe edition bonus tracks
No.	Title	Writer(s)	Length
11.	"Whatever Gets You Thru the Night"	John Lennon	3:19
12.	"One Night"	Dave Bartholomew, Pearl King, Anita Steiman	4:00
13.	"DVD ("The Making of Olympia" and "You Can Dance" promo video)"

Collector's Edition bonus disc
No.	Title	Writer(s)	Length
1.	"You Can Dance" (Fred Falke mix)		7:08
2.	"Alphaville" (Time and Space Machine mix)		7:06
3.	"Heartache by Numbers" (Circus Parade mix)		7:27
4.	"Me Oh My" (DJ Cleaver mix)	Ferry	6:42
5.	"Shameless" (Still Going mix)		8:12
6.	"BF Bass (Ode to Olympia)" (West End Wolf mix)		9:21
7.	"Reason or Rhyme" (Instrumental)		6:54

== Personnel ==
=== Musicians ===
- Bryan Ferry – vocals, keyboards, acoustic piano (1–9, 11, 12)
- Colin Good – keyboards (2), synthesizers (6)
- Brian Eno – synthesizers (2, 4, 6, 8)
- Babydaddy – keyboards (3), guitars (3), bass (3)
- Steve Nieve – acoustic piano (10)
- Robin "Radar" Rimbaud – electronics (1, 10)
- Chris Mullings – electronics (2, 3)
- John Monkman – electronics (4–9, 11, 12)
- Nile Rodgers – guitars (1, 5, 10)
- Oliver Thompson – guitars (1, 5, 10)
- David Williams – guitars (1, 5, 10)
- Neil Hubbard – guitars (2, 12)
- David A. Stewart – guitars (2)
- David Gilmour – guitars (4, 6)
- Jonny Greenwood – guitars (6)
- Phil Manzanera – guitars (6, 8, 9, 11)
- Chris Spedding – guitars (7, 8, 11)
- Merlin Ferry – guitars (9)
- Flea – bass guitar (1, 7, 11), bass solo (3)
- Gary "Mani" Mounfield – bass guitar (1, 8)
- Marcus Miller – bass guitar (2, 4, 6, 9, 10, 12)
- Andy Cato – bass guitar (5)
- Guy Pratt – bass guitar (11)
- Tara Ferry – drums (1, 3–5, 8, 10, 11)
- Andy Newmark – drums (1, 3–5, 8, 10, 11)
- Emily Dolan Davies – drums (2, 6, 7, 9)
- Steve Ferrone – drums (12)
- Frank Ricotti – percussion
- Anthony Pleeth – cello (2, 4, 6, 7)
- Vicci Wardman – viola (2, 4, 6, 7)
- Perry Montague-Mason – 1st violin (2, 4, 6, 7)
- Emlyn Singleton – 2nd violin (2, 4, 6, 7)
- Andy Mackay – oboe (3, 6, 11)
- Alice Retif – chorus vocals (1, 2)
- Katie Turner – chorus vocals (1)
- Ruby Turner – chorus vocals (2, 3, 11)
- Me'sha Bryan – chorus vocals (3, 11)
- Thomas Fetherstonhaugh – treble vocals (3)
- Sewuese Abwa – chorus vocals (4, 6–10, 12)
- Aleysha Gordon – chorus vocals (4, 6–10, 12)
- Hannah Khemoh – chorus vocals (4, 6–10, 12)
- Shar White – chorus vocals (5, 11)
- Tallulah Harlech – voice (6, 9)
- Jhelisa Anderson – chorus vocals (11)

=== Technical ===
- Bryan Ferry – producer
- Rhett Davies – producer
- Johnson Somerset – producer
- David A. Stewart – additional producer (2)
- Babydaddy – additional producer (3)
- Jake Shears – additional producer (3)
- Groove Armada – additional producers (5)
- Phil Manzanera – additional producer (8)
- John Monkman – additional producer (8), additional engineer
- Robin Trower – additional producer (11, 12)
- Simon Willey – engineer
- Ash Howes – additional engineer
- Jamie Johnson – additional engineer
- Tim Roe – additional engineer
- Sven Taits – additional engineer
- Chris Mullings – additional recording
- Bob Clearmountain – mixing (Note: Mixed at Mix This! (Los Angeles) and Sofa Sound (London))
- Bob Ludwig – mastering (Note: Mastered at Gateway Mastering (Portland, Maine))

=== Artwork ===
- Bryan Ferry – art direction
- Isaac Ferry – artwork production
- Gideon Ponte – set design
- Chris Peyton – layout
- Jono Patrick – digital artwork
- Adam Whitehead – photography
- Anton Corbijn – portrait of Bryan Ferry
- Richard Williams – liner notes
- Kate Moss – cover model

== Charts ==
Chart performance for Olympia
Chart (2010)	Peak position
Austrian Albums (Ö3 Austria)	29
Belgian Albums (Ultratop Flanders)	7
Belgian Albums (Ultratop Wallonia)	17
Danish Albums (Hitlisten)	26
Dutch Albums (Album Top 100)	29
European Albums (Billboard)	18
French Albums (SNEP)	25
German Albums (Offizielle Top 100)	15
Greek International Albums (IFPI)	52
Irish Albums (IRMA)	81
Italian Albums (FIMI)	37
Italian Albums (Musica e dischi)	47
Japanese Albums (Oricon)	80
Norwegian Albums (VG-lista)	16
Scottish Albums (Official Charts)	16
Spanish Albums (Promusicae)	56
Swedish Albums (Sverigetopplistan)	7
Swiss Albums (Schweizer Hitparade)	25
UK Albums (Official Charts)	19
US Billboard 200	71
US Top Alternative Albums (Billboard)	11
US Top Rock Albums (Billboard)	19
