= Rhett Davies =

British record producer (born 1949)

- Born: 1949 (age 76–77); London, England
- Occupations: Record producer; engineer
- Years active: 1973–present

Rhett Davies (born 1949) is an English record producer and engineer.

Davies' father was the trumpet player Ray Davies. Davies became a studio engineer at Island Records in the early 1970s. One of his first recording sessions was for Brian Eno's 1974 album Taking Tiger Mountain (By Strategy). Davies and Eno worked together on several subsequent projects and made innovations in studio recording techniques, especially regarding tape loops and drum machines. He produced for many artists of the 1970s and 1980s, and largely retired from production work in the 1990s, although he worked with Bryan Ferry on albums from 1999 to 2018 (As Time Goes By, Dylanesque, Olympia, Avonmore and Bitter-Sweet).

== Credits ==
Davies produced and/or engineered the following albums:

- Genesis - Selling England by the Pound
- Bryan Ferry - Another Time, Another Place, As Time Goes By, Boys and Girls, Dylanesque, Olympia, The Jazz Age, Avonmore, Bitter-Sweet
- Roxy Music - Viva!, Manifesto, Flesh and Blood, Avalon, High Road
- Trapeze - Hot Wire
- Robert Palmer - Sneakin' Sally Through the Alley, Maybe It's Live
- Brian Eno - Taking Tiger Mountain, Another Green World, Evening Star, Before and After Science, Ambient 1: Music for Airports, Music for Films
- Jim Capaldi - Whale Meat Again
- Phil Manzanera - Diamond Head, 801 Live, Listen Now, Primitive Guitars
- Camel - Snow Goose, Moonmadness, Rain Dances, A Live Record
- The Hollies - Russian Roulette, Crazy Steal
- Russ Ballard - Winning
- Dire Straits - Dire Straits
- Talking Heads - More Songs About Buildings and Food
- King Crimson - Discipline, Beat
- The B-52's - Wild Planet, Party Mix!
- Split Enz - Second Thoughts, Enz of an Era
- Orchestral Manoeuvres in the Dark - Dazzle Ships
- Icehouse - Measure for Measure
- Industry - Stranger to Stranger
- Cock Robin - First Love / Last Rites
- Til Tuesday - Welcome Home
- Wang Chung - Huang Chung
- Then Jerico - The Big Area
