= This Is Tomorrow (song) =

1977 single by Bryan Ferry

Single by Bryan Ferry

from the album In Your Mind
- B-side: "As the World Turns"
- Released: 1977
- Recorded: 1976–1977
- Studio: AIR (London)
- Genre: Rock; glam rock; pop rock
- Length: 3:42
- Label: Polydor
- Songwriter: Bryan Ferry
- Producers: Bryan Ferry; Steve Nye

Bryan Ferry singles chronology
"Heart on My Sleeve" (1976)	"This Is Tomorrow" (1977)	"Tokyo Joe" (1977)

Official video
- "This Is Tomorrow " on YouTube

"This Is Tomorrow" is a song by Bryan Ferry, the former lead vocalist for Roxy Music. It was released in 1977 as the first single from In Your Mind, his fourth solo studio album but the first consisting entirely of original songs. It was Ferry's tenth single. The single features the non-album track, "As the World Turns" as the B-side. The song peaked at number 9 in the UK Singles Chart, during its nine week run.

== Background ==
The title, "This Is Tomorrow" was inspired by a 1956 exhibition of pop art at the Whitechapel Art Gallery in London, devised by Richard Hamilton, who had taught Ferry at Newcastle University.

== Personnel ==
Musicians

- Bryan Ferry – lead vocals, keyboards
- Chris Spedding – guitar
- Paul Thompson – drums
- John Wetton – bass guitar
- David Skinner – piano, keyboards
- Mel Collins – saxophone
- Martin Drover – trumpet
- Chris Mercer – saxophone
