= God of Love =

God of Love may refer to:

- Deities of love in various cultures
- God of Love (album), a 1995 album by hardcore punk group Bad Brains
- God of Love (film), an Academy-Award-winning short film
- Pyar Ka Devta (lit. 'God of Love'), a 1991 Indian Hindi-language film

== See also ==
- Goddess of Love (disambiguation)
