= Stranger to Stranger (Industry album) =

Studio album by Industry
- Released: 1984
- Genres: New wave, synth-pop
- Label: Capitol
- Producer: Rhett Davies

Industry chronology
Industry (1983)	Stranger to Stranger (1984)

Stranger to Stranger is the first and only album by American new wave band Industry released on Capitol Records and distributed by EMI in 1984.

The album features the most successful track "State of the Nation", an anti-war song that broke into European charts. It was a minor hit in the U.S., peaking at No. 81 on the Billboard Hot 100. However, it was a bigger hit in Europe and peaked at number ten in Sweden. The album peaked at No. 48 in Sweden.

After this album, Jon Carin started a successful solo and session musician career, becoming a permanent member of the Pink Floyd studio & live band and co-writing Pink Floyd's hit single "Learning to Fly". Unger and Perrone went on to form their own bands.

== Critical reception ==
Professional ratings
Review scores
Source	Rating
AllMusic	4/5 stars

Upon its release, Bill Missett of the Blade Tribune called it a "worthy debut LP" that showed the band "continu[ing] to produce punchy, creative techno pop rock of pure mainstream quality". Mark Marymont of the Springfield News-Leader summarised, "Industry manufactures pop music. It won't break any new musical barriers with what it does, but the group does manage to produce some entertaining music when it wants to." Warren Gerds, writing for the Gannett News Service, considered the "rock with romance" album to be "neither terrific nor bad". He wrote, "The quartet has an ear for dance rhythms, so the album isn't totally dull, but so many tunes are oh-so-predictable, and the musicianship is not all that compelling." Jim Zebora of the Record-Journal awarded the album a C grade. He believed that, while some are "pleasant and have enough of a hook to stick in your memory for a while", most of the songs are "featureless electronic nothings". He added, "Industry, thus, is a soundalike band playing mostly soundalike music [and] has relatively little to say."

In a retrospective review, Michael Sutton of AllMusic observed a "surprisingly consistent synth-pop record". He described anti-war song "State of the Nation" as "a hook machine armed with incessantly hummable lyrics and a mercilessly catchy synthesized beat" and "the main reason collectors scour boxes of used vinyl for a copy of this album". Sutton also argued that "if Industry had received more exposure, 'Romantic Dreams' would've been included in the same league of beloved '80s new wave ballads such as Simple Minds' 'Don't You (Forget About Me)' and OMD's 'If You Leave'."

== Track listing ==
Side one

1. "Still of the Night" (Jon Carin) - 4:06
2. "Until We're Together" (Jon Carin, Rudy Perrone) - 3:59
3. "Romantic Dreams" (Jon Carin) - 3:53
4. "What Have I Got to Lose" (Jon Carin) - 4:03
5. "State of the Nation" (Jon Carin, Mercury Caronia) - 4:33

Side two

1. "Shangri-La" (Rudy Perrone) - 3:47
2. "Communication" (Jon Carin, Mercury Caronia) - 4:05
3. "All I Need Is You" (Jon Carin, Mercury Caronia, Rudy Perrone) - 2:55
4. "Stranger in a Strange Land" (Jon Carin) - 5:18
5. "Living Alone Too Long" (Jon Carin) - 4:07

== Personnel ==
Industry

- Jon Carin – lead vocals and backing vocals, synthesizers, drum machine, acoustic guitar on "Until We're Together" and vocoder
- Brian Unger – electric guitar and backing vocals
- Rudy Perrone – bass, additional guitar, lead vocals on "Shangri-La" and backing vocals
- Mercury Caronia – drum machine and backing vocals

with:

- Vini Poncia – "virtuoso" tambourine on "What Have I Got to Lose"

== Catalog number and format ==
- Catalog: ST-12316
- Format: Vinyl, LP, Album

== Notes ==
- Produced and engineered by Rhett Davies for EG Management Ltd.
- Mixed By - Bob Clearmountain, Bob Schaper
- Additional Production - Vini Poncia
- Engineered by Rhett Davies and Ray Niznik at Bearsville Sound, NY.
- Overdubs, mix and sweat by Dr. Bob Schaper at Boogie Hotel, Long Island, NY.
- Mastered by George Marino at Sterling Sound, NYC.

== Charts ==
Chart (1984)	Peak position
Swedish Albums (Sverigetopplistan)	48
