= Logging Time =

EP by Industry
- Released: 1980
- Recorded: 1978–1979
- Genre: New wave, industrial
- Label: Metro Records

Industry chronology
Logging Time (1980)	Turning to Light (1981)

Logging Time is the debut release by American new wave band Industry. The extended play was released independently on Metro Records in 1980.

Its tagline was shown at the back of the album. It describes the definition of Industry:

- "INDUSTRY is the catalyst between man, his material needs & wants."
- "INDUSTRY indefinitely enlarges the complex dichotomy of material exchange."
- "INDUSTRY maintains the econoculture & the legend of technoevolution."

== Track listing ==
Plate 1
No.	Title	Length
1.	"Logging Time"	2:00
2.	"Caribbean Cruise"	2:20
3.	"Intransition"	2:03

Plate 2
No.	Title	Length
4.	"Ready for the Wave"	3:42
5.	"Production Goes On"	2:27

== Notes ==
- Produced, engineered, and mixed between 1978 and 1979 at Warehouse, N.Y.
- Distributed by SkyDisc N.Y.
- RPMs are not printed on the record or cover.
