= Industry (American band) =

- Also known as: Industrial Complex
- Origin: Long Island, New York, U.S.
- Genres: New wave, synthpop
- Years active: 1978–1984
- Labels: Amstate Records; Capitol Records

Industry was an American new wave band formed in 1978 in New York City as Industrial Complex, their name later changing to Industry. In 1981, the band became commercial but disbanded three years later. Their only well known album was Stranger to Stranger, released in 1984 which included the hit single, "State of the Nation".

== Members ==
1978–1981 (1978 as Industrial Complex, 1979 as Industry)

- Andrew Geyer - guitar, tape loops
- Mercury Caronia - vocals, drums
- Sean Robin Kelly - bass, backing vocals

1981–1984 (as Industry)

- Jon Carin - lead vocals, keyboards, synthesizers, programming, guitar
- Brian Unger - guitar, backing vocals
- Mercury Caronia - drums, backing vocals
- Rudy Perrone - bass, guitar, backing vocals, occasional lead vocals

2014–2016 (as MASS/Industry)

- Mercury Caronia - drums, keyboards, vocals
- Andrew Geyer - guitar, tape loops, vocals
- Sean Robin Kelly - bass
- Steve Northshield - guitar

== History ==
Industry was founded as Industrial Complex in 1978 by Mercury Caronia (drummer, vocalist, keyboard player, composer and studio engineer), Andrew Geyer (guitarist) and Sean Kelly (bass guitarist and backing vocalist). The band's name was later changed to Industry. Caronia and Geyer worked with experimental electronic music, odd time signatures, tape loops, synthesizers and innovative guitar playing into various methods of recording.

In 1981, Geyer and Kelly left the band. Guitarist Brian Unger, new lead singer Jon Carin and Rudy Perrone (who was previously in a progressive rock band called Cathedral, with Mercury Caronia) joined the group which signed to Capitol Records.

The band's best-known single, "State of the Nation", entered the Swedish and Italian charts between 1983 and 1984, earning them a place as the support act for artists such as Billy Idol, Talk Talk and INXS. The second single from the same album, "Still of the Night", was less successful. The band split up in 1984.

== Post-split ==
After the split, Carin started a successful session musician and solo career, becoming a permanent member of the Pink Floyd live band and co-writing Pink Floyd's hit single "Learning to Fly". Unger and Perrone went on to form their own bands. Sean Kelly went on to work as an arranger and composer under the name Sean Robin (his middle name).

== Discography ==
=== Albums ===
- Stranger to Stranger (1984) No. 16 Italy

=== EPs ===
- Logging Time (1980)
- Turning to Light (1981)
- Industry (1983) (Mini vinyl LP / 5 songs)

=== Singles ===
- "Logging Time" (1980)
- "Ready for the Wave" (1980)
- "Turning to Light" (1981)
- "State of the Nation" (1983) - AUS No.78, IT No. 3, SWE No. 10, U.S. No. 81
- "Communication" (1983)
- "Still of the Night" (1984)
- "What Have I Got to Lose" (1984)
