= Avonmore (album) =

Studio album by Bryan Ferry
- Released: 17 November 2014
- Studio: Studio One (Olympia, London); 4th Street Recording (Santa Monica, California); Saltlands (Brooklyn, New York)
- Genre: Art pop; sophisti-pop
- Length: 43:21
- Label: BMG Rights Management
- Producer: Bryan Ferry; Rhett Davies; Johnson Somerset; Todd Terje

Bryan Ferry chronology
The Jazz Age (2012)	Avonmore (2014)	Bitter-Sweet (2018)

Professional ratings
Review scores
Source	Rating
AllMusic	4/5 stars
The Guardian	4/5 stars
Pitchfork	6.7/10
PopMatters	8/10
Rolling Stone	3/5 stars

Avonmore is the fifteenth studio album by the English singer Bryan Ferry, released on 17 November 2014 by BMG Rights Management.

== Background ==
The album was named after the location of Ferry's studio in London where it was recorded. The album was announced on 23 September 2014 with a preview of the song "Loop De Li". The album was produced by Ferry with long-term collaborator Rhett Davies, who has produced several albums for Ferry and Roxy Music. The album also features Ferry regulars such as Fonzi Thornton, Nile Rodgers, Marcus Miller, and Johnny Marr (who co-wrote the track "Soldier of Fortune"). The album includes two cover versions, a rendition of Stephen Sondheim's "Send In the Clowns" and a version of "Johnny and Mary", originally by Robert Palmer. The latter track was a collaboration with the Norwegian DJ/producer Todd Terje and first appeared on Terje's album It's Album Time which was released earlier in 2014.

Avonmore peaked at number 19 on the UK Albums Chart, and number 72 on the US Billboard 200.

== Critical reception ==
Reception of the album was generally positive. In a four-out-of-five-stars review, AllMusic critic Stephen Thomas Erlewine wrote that "this is Ferry's prime, a moment when his legacy was intact but yet to be preserved in amber" and that the album "consciously evokes this distinct period, sometimes sighing into the exquisite ennui of Avalon but usually favouring the fine tailoring of Boys and Girls, a record where every sequenced rhythm, keyboard, and guitar line blended into an alluring urbane pulse" and that "the songs are what makes this record something more than a fling". PopMatters critic John Paul wrote that the album "functions as a well-deserved victory lap for both Ferry and those he's assembled, triumphantly returning to relevance and reminding listeners he's been doing this since the '70s. It's just taken this long for the mainstream to catch up with where he's been all along". Writer T. Cole Rachel from Pitchfork was less positive, giving the album 6.7 out of 10, writing that the album, in places, "flounders when the music, which routinely flirts with a kind of adult contemporary smoothness, leans over into blandness" and stating that "Ferry's well-documented good taste is both an asset and possibly a curse" and concluding that the record is "a fine addition to Bryan Ferry's oeuvre, if not necessarily a terribly challenging one".

== Special edition ==
On 29 October 2015, Ferry announced the release of the a special edition package of Avonmore, containing the album on vinyl and CD, along with a 48-page book of photos by photographer Matthew Becker.

== Track listing ==
No.	Title	Writer(s)	Producer(s)	Length
1.	"Loop De Li"	Bryan Ferry	Ferry, Rhett Davies, Johnson Somerset	4:18
2.	"Midnight Train"	Ferry	Ferry, Davies, Somerset	3:49
3.	"Soldier of Fortune"	Ferry, Johnny Marr	Ferry, Davies	4:25
4.	"Driving Me Wild"	Ferry	Ferry, Davies	3:37
5.	"A Special Kind of Guy"	Ferry	Ferry, Davies	3:14
6.	"Avonmore"	Ferry, Oliver Thompson	Ferry, Davies	5:13
7.	"Lost"	Ferry	Ferry, Davies	2:47
8.	"One Night Stand"	Ferry	Ferry, Davies, Somerset	5:05
9.	"Send In the Clowns"	Stephen Sondheim	Ferry, Davies	4:02
10.	"Johnny and Mary"	Robert Palmer	Todd Terje	6:47
Total length:				43:15

== Personnel ==
"Loop De Li"

- Bryan Ferry – vocals, keyboards
- Neil Hubbard, Steve Jones, Johnny Marr, Nile Rodgers, Oliver Thompson and David Williams – guitars
- Marcus Miller – bass guitar
- Tara Ferry – drums
- John Moody – oboe
- Richard White – saxophone
- Bobbie Gordon, Hannah Khemoh, Laura Mann, Emily Panic, Jodie Scantlebury and Fonzi Thornton – backing vocals

"Midnight Train"

- Bryan Ferry – vocals, keyboards
- Neil Hubbard, Steve Jones, Johnny Marr, Nile Rodgers, Jacob Quistgaard, Chris Spedding, Jeff Thall, Oliver Thompson and David Williams – guitars
- Marcus Miller and Guy Pratt – bass guitar
- Tara Ferry and Andy Newmark – drums
- Fonzi Thornton – backing vocals

"Soldier of Fortune"

- Bryan Ferry – vocals, keyboards
- Paul Beard – keyboards
- Neil Hubbard, Steve Jones and Johnny Marr – guitars
- Marcus Miller – bass guitar
- Tara Ferry – drums
- Iain Dixon, Robert Fowler and Richard White – saxophones
- Fonzi Thornton – backing vocals

"Driving Me Wild"

- Bryan Ferry – vocals, keyboards
- Neil Hubbard, Johnny Marr, Nile Rodgers and Oliver Thompson – guitars
- Marcus Miller and Guy Pratt – bass guitar
- Tara Ferry – drums
- Cherisse Osei – percussion
- Richard White – saxophone
- Fonzi Thornton – backing vocals

"A Special Kind of Guy"

- Bryan Ferry – vocals, keyboards
- Neil Hubbard, Steve Jones and Nile Rodgers – guitars
- Marcus Miller and Guy Pratt – bass guitar
- Tara Ferry – drums
- Fonzi Thornton – backing vocals

"Avonmore"

- Bryan Ferry – vocals, keyboards
- Neil Hubbard, Steve Jones, Johnny Marr, Nile Rodgers and Oliver Thompson – guitars
- Flea, Guy Pratt and Paul Turner – bass guitar
- Tara Ferry and Cherisse Osei – drums
- Frank Ricotti – percussions
- Richard White – alto saxophone

"Lost"

- Bryan Ferry – vocals, keyboards
- Neil Hubbard and Mark Knopfler – guitars
- Neil Jason – bass guitar
- Tara Ferry, Andy Newmark and Cherisse Osei – drums

"One Night Stand"

- Bryan Ferry – vocals, keyboards
- Paul Beard – keyboards
- Neil Hubbard, Steve Jones, Johnny Marr, Nile Rodgers, Jacob Quistgaard, Chris Spedding, Jeff Thall, Oliver Thompson and David Williams – guitars
- Marcus Miller – bass guitar
- Tara Ferry – drums
- Maceo Parker – alto saxophone
- Sewuse Abwa, Michelle John, Hannah Khemoh, Ronnie Spector and Shar White – backing vocals

"Send in the Clowns"

- Bryan Ferry – vocals, string arrangements
- Colin Good – acoustic piano, string arrangements
- Johnny Marr – guitars
- Marcus Miller – bass guitar
- Chris Laurence and Tom Wheatley – double bass
- Tara Ferry and Cherisse Osei – drums
- Frank Ricotti – percussions
- Richard White – alto saxophone
- Enrico Tomasso – trumpet

"Johnny and Mary"

- Bryan Ferry – vocals, acoustic piano
- Todd Terje – synthesizers, programming
- Oliver Thompson – guitars
- Cherisse Osei – drums
- Hanne Hukkelberg – backing vocals

Technical

- Chris Mullings – engineer
- Pete Wells – engineer
- Simon Willey – engineer
- Tim Roe – additional engineer
- Mark Knight – assistant engineer
- Craig Silvey – mixing
- Eduardo Paz – mix assistant
- Adam Ayan – mastering at Gateway Mastering (Portland, Maine)
- Isaac Ferry – executive producer
- Tara Ferry – executive producer

Artwork

- Johnny Dewe Mathews – cover photography
- Neil Kirk – inner sleeve photography
- Michael Knight – design
- Jono Patrick – digital artwork
- Richard White – liner notes

== Charts ==
Chart performance for Avonmore
Chart (2014)	Peak position
Austrian Albums (Ö3 Austria)	34
Belgian Albums (Ultratop Flanders)	29
Belgian Albums (Ultratop Wallonia)	43
Dutch Albums (Album Top 100)	47
French Albums (SNEP)	63
German Albums (Offizielle Top 100)	23
Irish Albums (IRMA)	47
Italian Albums (FIMI)	71
Japanese Albums (Oricon)	86
Norwegian Albums (VG-lista)	16
Scottish Albums (Official Charts)	19
Swedish Albums (Sverigetopplistan)	19
Swiss Albums (Schweizer Hitparade)	37
UK Albums (Official Charts)	19
US Billboard 200	72
US Top Rock Albums (Billboard)	18
