= As Time Goes By (Bryan Ferry album) =

Studio album by Bryan Ferry
- Released: 14 October 1999
- Studio: Lansdowne (London)
- Genre: Traditional pop; retro swing; vocal jazz
- Length: 44:30
- Label: Virgin
- Producer: Bryan Ferry; Rhett Davies

Bryan Ferry chronology
Mamouna (1994)	As Time Goes By (1999)	Frantic (2002)

Professional ratings
Review scores
Source	Rating
AllMusic	3/5 stars
The A.V. Club	Favourable
Entertainment Weekly	B
The Stranger	4/5 stars

As Time Goes By is the tenth studio album by the English singer Bryan Ferry, first released in Japan on 14 October 1999 and then in the UK on 25 October by Virgin Records. Consisting of cover versions of popular songs and jazz standards, the album was co-produced by Ferry with Rhett Davies, who had worked with Ferry since his days with Roxy Music. It peaked at number 16 on the UK Albums Chart and has been certified Gold by the British Phonographic Industry (BPI), denoting shipments in excess of 100,000 copies.

== Critical reception ==
Stephen Thomas Erlewine of AllMusic wrote of the album: "On the surface, it may seem like a departure for Ferry, but in the end, it's entirely of a piece with his body of work. True, it may not be a major album in the scheme of things, but it's easy to be seduced by its casual elegance." Keith Phipps of The A.V. Club commented that "the results are both predictable and thrilling, musically tasteful but as emotionally raw as good manners will allow."

== Track listing ==
No.	Title	Writer(s)	Length
1.	"As Time Goes By"	Herman Hupfeld	2:35
2.	"The Way You Look Tonight"	Jerome Kern, Dorothy Fields	3:33
3.	"Easy Living"	Ralph Rainger, Leo Robin	2:14
4.	"I'm in the Mood for Love"	Jimmy McHugh, Fields	4:20
5.	"Where or When"	Rodgers and Hart	3:20
6.	"When Somebody Thinks You're Wonderful"	Harry Woods	3:00
7.	"Sweet and Lovely"	Charles Daniels, Gus Arnheim, Harry Tobias	3:10
8.	"Miss Otis Regrets"	Cole Porter	2:44
9.	"Time on My Hands"	Vincent Youmans, Harold Adamson, Mack Gordon	3:01
10.	"Lover, Come Back to Me"	Sigmund Romberg, Oscar Hammerstein	2:51
11.	"Falling in Love Again"	Friedrich Hollaender, Sammy Lerner	2:27
12.	"Love Me or Leave Me"	Walter Donaldson, Gus Kahn	2:42
13.	"You Do Something to Me"	Porter	2:46
14.	"Just One of Those Things"	Porter	2:44
15.	"September Song"	Kurt Weill, Maxwell Anderson	3:00

== Personnel ==
=== Musicians ===
- Bryan Ferry – lead vocals, synthesizers (4), arrangements
- Colin Good – grand piano (1–14), synthesizers (4), harmonium (11), musical director, arrangements
- Cynthia Millar – Ondes Martenot (1, 4, 5, 8, 15)
- James Sanger – programming (4)
- José Libertella – bandoneon (4, 13)
- Luis Stazo – bandoneon (4, 13)
- Nils Solberg – guitars (1–4, 6, 9, 10, 12, 15)
- Phil Manzanera – guitars (4)
- Martin Wheatley – banjo (7, 14), guitars (13)
- Richard Jeffries – bass (1–3, 6, 7, 9, 10, 12–14)
- Chris Laurence – bass (4, 5, 11, 15)
- John Sutton – drums (1–3, 7, 9, 10, 12–14)
- Andy Newmark – drums (4)
- Paul Clarvis – drums (6)
- Frank Ricotti – percussion (4, 14)
- Tobias Tak – tap dance (6)
- Anthony Pleeth – cello (1, 5, 8, 11, 13–15)
- Hugh Webb – harp (1, 5, 11, 15)
- Philip Dukes – viola (1, 5, 11)
- Peter Lale – viola (13, 14, 15)
- David Woodcock – violin (1, 5, 11)
- Gavyn Wright – violin (1, 5, 11, 13–15)
- Abraham Leborovich – violin (4), violin solo (13)
- Boguslaw Kostecki – violin (13, 14)
- Wilfred Gibson – violin (15)
- Alan Barnes – clarinet (2, 3, 6, 7, 12, 14), tenor saxophone (2, 3, 6, 7, 9, 10, 12), alto saxophone (10, 14)
- Jim Tomlinson – clarinet (3, 6, 12), alto saxophone (3, 6, 9, 12)
- Robert Fowler – clarinet (7, 14), tenor saxophone (9, 10, 14)
- Anthony Pike – bass clarinet (15)
- Nicholas Bucknail – clarinet (15)
- Timothy Lines – clarinet (15)
- David White – clarinet (15)
- Malcolm Earle Smith – trombone (2, 3, 6, 9, 10, 12)
- Bob Hunt – trombone (7, 14)
- Enrico Tomasso – trumpet (2, 3, 6, 7, 9, 10, 12, 14)
- Alice Retif – poem reading (4)
- The Oxford Girls Choir – choir (7)

=== Technical ===
- Bryan Ferry – producer
- Rhett Davies – producer
- Robin Trower – associate producer (6, 15)
- Mark Tucker – engineer
- Steve Pelluet – assistant engineer
- Chris Dibble – additional engineer
- Sven Taits – additional engineer
- Simon Puxley – engineer consultant
- Bob Ludwig – mastering at Gateway Mastering (Portland, Maine)
- Nicole Blumberg – production coordinator
- Juliet Mann – production coordinator

=== Artwork ===
- Nick de Ville – art direction
- Bryan Ferry – art direction
- Bogdan Zarkowski – artwork
- Mike Owen – photography

== Charts ==
Chart performance for As Time Goes By
Chart (1999)	Peak position
Austrian Albums (Ö3 Austria)	28
European Albums (Music & Media)	23
French Albums (SNEP)	55
German Albums (Offizielle Top 100)	22
New Zealand Albums (RMNZ)	8
Norwegian Albums (VG-lista)	23
Scottish Albums (OCC)	28
Swedish Albums (Sverigetopplistan)	48
UK Albums (OCC)	16
US Billboard 200	195

== Certifications ==
Certifications for As Time Goes By
Region	Certification	Certified units/sales
Argentina (CAPIF)	Platinum	40,000^{^}
New Zealand (RMNZ)	Gold	7,500^{^}
United Kingdom (BPI)	Gold	100,000^{^}
^{^} Shipments figures based on certification alone.
