= The Jazz Age (The Bryan Ferry Orchestra album) =

Studio album by The Bryan Ferry Orchestra
- Released: 26 November 2012
- Recorded: 2012
- Studio: Studio One, Olympia, London
- Genre: Orchestral jazz, retro swing, trad jazz
- Length: 37:46
- Label: BMG Rights Management
- Producer: Bryan Ferry, Rhett Davies

Bryan Ferry chronology
Olympia (2010)	The Jazz Age (2012)	Avonmore (2014)

Professional ratings
Review scores
Source	Rating
AllMusic	4/5 stars
Impact	3.5/5 stars
Pitchfork	7.4/10 stars

The Jazz Age is the fourteenth studio album by the English singer Bryan Ferry released in 2012. It was co-produced by Ferry and Rhett Davies, with arrangements by Colin Good. The album is a re-recording of some of Ferry's compositions played in the jazz style of the 1920s by The Bryan Ferry Orchestra. The 13 songs have been chosen from 11 albums, from his very first release Roxy Music (1972) to his then most recent solo record, Olympia (2010). It was Ferry's lowest charting album of his career, peaking at #50 on the UK Albums Chart.

Ferry himself does not perform on the album, which consists entirely of instrumental performances. Talking about the inspiration behind the reinterpretations, Ferry told Clash, "I've sort of gone back to the music that I liked listening to when I was a young lad, nine or ten years old - I was really fairly precocious for that time." Interviewed for The Telegraph, he added, "It came out of the desire to make an instrumental album of my songs. I was fascinated to see how they would stand up without singing."

== Cover art ==
The artwork for The Jazz Age album consists of illustrations by the renowned French poster artist Paul Colin (1892–1985). The album cover and internal booklet include elements from his 'Le Tumult Noir' portfolio of 1929. The introduction to an exhibition at the Smithsonian Institution, National Portrait Gallery states: "In 1925, Josephine Baker and her revue, La Revue Nègre, exploded on the Paris stage with a wild new dance called the Charleston. The Jazz Age was at its height, and Baker was destined to become its high priestess. Four years later, French poster artist Paul Colin, Baker's one-time lover and life-long friend, published a portfolio of vividly colored lithographs titled "Le Tumulte Noir" ("The Black Craze") which captured the exuberant jazz music and dance that dazzled Paris."

== Sound Design & Production ==
The Jazz Age was recorded at Bryan Ferry’s own personal studio/office complex, Studio One, located at Avonmore Place in Olympia, London, England. Using some of the best available British jazz musicians, playing the standard instrumentation of the 1920’s, in arrangements by pianist Colin Good (Ferry’s musical director for ten years) in the Jazz Age style, with a banjo rhythm, and lead clarinets, it was produced (by Ferry and Rhett Davies) and engineered (by Simon Willey & David Phelan) to achieve an authentic 1920’s sound as well. Recorded in 2012, with all the tools available at the time, but used to produce a vintage sound (Ferry’s original conceit?) as if these are the ‘lost’ recordings of the original ‘Roxy Music Band’ unearthed from the archives, being played on your great-grandparents’ old Victrola.

== Critical reception ==
Reviewing for AllMusic, Thom Jurek said, "All 13 of these tunes have been wildly revamped and offer interesting textures", "...but the music here is played so well, it doesn't feel gimmicky." concluding, "Given that Ferry doesn't sing on The Jazz Age, the appeal for casual fans is debatable. But for the faithful, trad-jazz heads, and open-minded listeners, the musical quality -- from expert arrangements, virtuosic playing, and the brilliant concept -- offer something wholly different and rewarding."

Chris Roberts, writing for the BBC Music Reviews, sees a natural development of his solo career: "Bryan Ferry, never averse to a re-make/re-model (as his lifelong parallel career as a covers-crooner of "ready-mades" has established), has cooked up something completely unexpected and unprecedented here." "As fascinating as it is perplexing, anything but obvious, and therefore to be applauded."

In his Pitchfork review (2013) Ned Raggett considers the absence of Ferry's vocal, "If anyone is the lead "voice" throughout it would be [trumpeter Enrico] Tomasso or saxophonists Alan Barnes and Richard White, whose various solo turns on a number of songs take the place of the singing. As a result, it becomes a strangely affecting blend-- Ferry is here almost by implication, a certain unavoidably melancholic sigh that emerges in hints in the arrangements, even at their merriest."

== Legacy ==
Film director Baz Luhrmann asked to use Ferry's song "Love Is the Drug" from The Jazz Age album for the 2013 film The Great Gatsby. This resulted in a collaboration with The Bryan Ferry Orchestra to create several jazz pieces throughout the movie, released as a separate album titled The Great Gatsby – The Jazz Recordings (A Selection of Yellow Cocktail Music). Ferry began touring with The Bryan Ferry Orchestra in 2013, including a performance at the 2013 Cannes Film Festival which was opened by Luhrmann's The Great Gatsby film.

== Track listing ==
All songs were written by Bryan Ferry except where noted.

1. "Do The Strand" – 2:10
2. "Love Is The Drug" – 3:14 (Ferry, Andy Mackay)
3. "Don’t Stop The Dance" – 2:51 (Ferry, Rhett Davies)
4. "Just Like You" – 3:24
5. "Avalon" – 2:23
6. "The Bogus Man" – 2:07
7. "Slave to Love" – 2:38
8. "This Is Tomorrow" – 2:27
9. "The Only Face" – 2:57
10. "I Thought" – 2:36 (Ferry, Brian Eno)
11. "Reason or Rhyme" – 4:15
12. "Virginia Plain" – 2:14
13. "This Island Earth" – 4:24

== Personnel ==
- Bryan Ferry – bandleader, composer
- Colin Good – grand piano, arrangements
- Martin Wheatley – guitars, banjo
- Chris Laurence – double bass
- John Sutton – drums
- Frank Ricotti – percussion
- Richard White – alto saxophone, bass saxophone, bass clarinet, clarinet
- Alan Barnes – baritone saxophone, clarinet
- Robert Fowler – tenor saxophone, clarinet
- Malcolm Earle Smith – trombone
- Enrico Tomasso – trumpet, cornet
- Katy Cox – cello
- Sarah Chapman – viola
- Emma Owens – viola
- Emma Parker – violin
- Victoria Sutherland – violin

== Production ==
- Bryan Ferry – producer, liner notes
- Rhett Davies – producer, recording, mixing
- Simon Willey – engineer, recording, mixing
- David Phelan – assistant engineer
- Bob Ludwig – mastering
- Paul Colin – illustrations
- Richard White – liner notes
- Alistair Norbury – management

Studios

- Recorded and Mixed at Studio One (Olympia, London, UK).
- Mastered at Gateway Mastering (Portland, Maine, USA).
