= The Bryan Ferry Orchestra =

Jazz ensemble founded and led by Bryan Ferry

The Bryan Ferry Orchestra is a retro-jazz ensemble founded and led by Bryan Ferry. They exclusively play his work in a 1920s jazz style. Ferry formed the orchestra out of a desire to focus on the melodies of his songs, and "see how they would stand up without singing". Their album, The Jazz Age, was released on 26 November 2012 as a 10-inch vinyl folio edition and on 12-inch vinyl, CD and digital download, on BMG Rights Management. Ferry neither plays nor sings with the orchestra; BBC reviewer Chris Roberts called it a "peculiar concept then, with Ferry now, almost Warhol-like, sagely mute to one side while collaborators silkscreen his own icons. As fascinating as it is perplexing, anything but obvious, and therefore to be applauded."

== Personnel ==
=== Performance ===
- Colin Good – piano and arrangements
- Enrico Tomasso – cornet and trumpet
- Malcolm Earle-Smith – trombone
- Richard White – alto and bass saxophones, saxinet, bass clarinet
- Robert Fowler – tenor saxophone and clarinet
- Alan Barnes – alto and baritone saxophones, clarinet, saxinet
- Martin Wheatley – banjo and guitar
- John Sutton – drums

== Discography ==
- The Jazz Age (26 November 2012)
- The Great Gatsby: Music from Baz Luhrmann's Film (6 May 2013)
  - "Love Is the Drug" (with Bryan Ferry)
  - "Crazy in Love" (with Emeli Sandé)
- A Selection of Yellow Cocktail Music from Baz Luhrmann's Film The Great Gatsby (The Great Gatsby Jazz Recordings) (10 May 2013)
- Babylon Berlin (Music from the Original TV Series) (2017)
  - "Dance Away"
  - "Reason or Rhyme"
  - "Bitters End"
  - "Alphaville"
  - "Chance Meeting"
- Bitter-Sweet (30 November 2018)
