= Bitter-Sweet (Bryan Ferry album) =

2018 album by Bryan Ferry

Studio album by Bryan Ferry and His Orchestra
- Released: 30 November 2018
- Studio: Studio One (London)
- Length: 42:48
- Label: BMG Rights Management
- Producer: Bryan Ferry; Rhett Davies

Bryan Ferry chronology
Avonmore (2014)	Bitter-Sweet (2018)	Loose Talk (2025)

Professional ratings
Review scores
Source	Rating
AllMusic	4/5 stars
Clash	8/10
musicOMH	4/5 stars

Bitter-Sweet is the sixteenth studio album by the English singer Bryan Ferry, officially under the name of Bryan Ferry and His Orchestra. It was released on 30 November 2018 by BMG Rights Management.

== Background ==
The album contains remakes of older songs by Ferry and Roxy Music, all arranged in a jazz style reminiscent of 1930s Berlin. Approximately half the songs feature Ferry as a vocalist; the other songs are instrumentals.

The album came up after Ferry's participation on the German TV series Babylon Berlin; six of the songs on this album were released on the Babylon Berlin soundtrack. This album is similar to, but not quite in the same style as, Ferry's 2012 album The Jazz Age. That album was completely instrumental and was more directly an homage to the American 1920s jazz tradition, rather than the German re-interpretation of that tradition. A version of "Reason Or Rhyme" appears on both albums; they are notably different in arrangements.

As shown in the album credits, Ferry dedicated Bitter-Sweet to his friend Jeremy Catto, who had died that year.

== Track listing ==
All tracks composed by Bryan Ferry, except where noted.

1. "Alphaville" (Ferry, David A. Stewart)
2. "Reason or Rhyme"
3. "Sign of the Times"
4. "New Town"
5. "Limbo" (Ferry, Patrick Leonard)
6. "Bitter-Sweet" (Ferry, Andy Mackay)
7. "Dance Away"
8. "Zamba" (Ferry, Patrick Leonard)
9. "Sea Breezes"
10. "While My Heart Is Still Beating" (Ferry, Andy Mackay)
11. "Bitters End"
12. "Chance Meeting"
13. "Boys and Girls"

Ferry sings on tracks 1, 2, 4, 6, 8, 10 and 13. The remaining tracks are instrumentals.

== Charts ==
Chart performance for Bitter-Sweet
Chart (2018)	Peak position
Austrian Albums (Ö3 Austria)	28
Belgian Albums (Ultratop Flanders)	151
Belgian Albums (Ultratop Wallonia)	194
Dutch Albums (Album Top 100)	193
German Albums (Offizielle Top 100)	46
Scottish Albums (OCC)	37
Swiss Albums (Schweizer Hitparade)	80
UK Albums (OCC)	60
UK Jazz & Blues Albums (OCC)	1
US Independent Albums (Billboard)	29
US Top Jazz Albums (Billboard)	5
US Traditional Jazz Albums (Billboard)	5
