= Another Time, Another Place (Bryan Ferry album) =

Studio album by Bryan Ferry
- Released: 5 July 1974
- Recorded: Spring 1974
- Genre: Rock
- Length: 41:58
- Label: Island
- Producer: Bryan Ferry; John Punter

Bryan Ferry chronology
These Foolish Things (1973)	Another Time, Another Place (1974)	Let's Stick Together (1976)

Professional ratings
Review scores
Source	Rating
AllMusic	3.5/5 stars
Christgau's Record Guide	B+
Džuboks	favorable
Tom Hull	B

Another Time, Another Place is the second solo studio album by the English singer Bryan Ferry. The album reached #4 in the UK charts in 1974.

Recording took place in London at Island, Ramport and AIR studios. Like These Foolish Things, Another Time, Another Place is essentially a cover album, with the exception of the title track, which gave its title to the album and was written by Ferry. It featured a Bob Dylan song ("A Hard Rain's a-Gonna Fall" on the former LP, "It Ain't Me Babe" on the latter) and a standard (the title track of These Foolish Things, "Smoke Gets in Your Eyes" on Another Time, Another Place) but while These Foolish Things emphasized an early-'60s girl-group repertoire, Another Time, Another Place turned to soul music (Sam Cooke, Ike & Tina Turner) and country music (Kris Kristofferson, Willie Nelson, Joe South).

== Critical reception ==
Reviewing for AllMusic, critic Ned Raggett wrote of the album "The album as a whole feels a touch more formal than its predecessor, but Ferry and company, plus various brass and string sections, turn on the showiness enough to make it all fun. A harbinger of solo albums to come appears at end -- the title track, a Ferry original."

== Track listing ==
Side one
No.	Title	Writer(s)	Length
1.	"The 'In' Crowd" (Dobie Gray cover from the album Dobie Gray Sings for 'In' Crowders That 'Go Go' (1965))	Billy Page	4:36
2.	"Smoke Gets in Your Eyes" (cover)	Jerome Kern, Otto Harbach	2:53
3.	"Walk a Mile in My Shoes" (cover)	Joe South	4:44
4.	"Funny How Time Slips Away" (Billy Walker cover)	Willie Nelson	3:31
5.	"You Are My Sunshine" (cover)	Jimmie Davis, Charles Mitchell	6:47

Side two
No.	Title	Writer(s)	Length
1.	"(What a) Wonderful World" (Sam Cooke cover from the album The Wonderful World of Sam Cooke (1960))	Sam Cooke, Herb Alpert, Lou Adler	2:55
2.	"It Ain't Me Babe" (Bob Dylan cover from the album Another Side of Bob Dylan (1964))	Bob Dylan	3:57
3.	"Fingerpoppin'" (cover)	Ike Turner	3:34
4.	"Help Me Make It Through the Night" (Kris Kristofferson cover from the album Kristofferson (1970))	Kris Kristofferson	4:15
5.	"Another Time, Another Place" (Ferry's first original composition as a soloist)	Ferry	4:46

== Charts ==
Chart (1974)	Peak position
Australian (Kent Music Report)	21

== Personnel ==
Soloists:

- Bryan Ferry – lead vocals, keyboards, organ, harmonica
- David O'List – guitars
- John Porter – guitars
- John Wetton – bass, fiddle
- Paul Thompson – drums
- Ruan O'Lochlainn – alto saxophone
- Chris Mercer – tenor saxophone
- Chris Pyne – trombone
- Henry Lowther – trumpet

Also featuring: (instruments are mentioned tentatively based on the credits of other Bryan Ferry records):

- J. Peter Robinson – keyboards
- Mark Warner – guitars
- John Punter – bass
- Tony Carr – drums, percussion
- Tony Charles – drums
- Bruce Rowland – drums
- Morris Pert – percussion
- Jimmy Hastings – flute
- Jeff Daly – saxophones
- Bob Efford – saxophones
- Ronnie Ross – saxophones
- Alan Skidmore – saxophones
- Winston Stone – saxophones
- Malcolm Griffiths – trombone
- Steve Saunders – trombone
- Paul Cosh – trumpet
- Martin Drover – trumpet
- Alf Reece – tuba
- Ann Odell – string arrangements
- Martyn Ford – brass arrangements
- Vicki Brown – backing vocals
- Helen Chappelle – backing vocals
- Don Cirilo – backing vocals
- Barry St. John – backing vocals
- Liza Strike – backing vocals

== Production ==
- Bryan Ferry – producer, cover concept
- John Punter – producer, engineer
- Rhett Davies – assistant engineer
- Mark Dodson – assistant engineer
- Gary Edwards – assistant engineer
- Sean Milligan – assistant engineer
- Eric Boman – photography
- Nicholas de Ville – design
- Bob Bowkett (C.C.S.) – artwork
- Antony Price – fashion
- Simon Puxley – media consultant
