= Dylanesque =

Studio album by Bryan Ferry
- Released: 5 March 2007
- Recorded: 2006–2007
- Studio: The Town House (London); Studio One (London); 4th Street Recording (Santa Monica, California); RAK (London)
- Genre: Pop rock
- Length: 42:29
- Label: Virgin
- Producer: Rhett Davies; Bryan Ferry

Bryan Ferry chronology
Frantic (2002)	Dylanesque (2007)	Olympia (2010)

Professional ratings
Review scores
Source	Rating
AllMusic	3.5/5 stars
Music Box	3.5/5 stars
Pitchfork	1.9/10
Q	3/5 stars
Rolling Stone	3.5/5 stars
Uncut	4/5 stars

Dylanesque is the twelfth studio album by the English singer Bryan Ferry, released on 5 March 2007 by Virgin Records. The album consists of cover versions of ten Bob Dylan songs and one traditional song that Dylan himself covered on his first album. It charted at number five in both the United Kingdom and Sweden. Soon after completion of the album, Ferry returned with most of the same musicians to film live re-recordings of the songs in the studio. The film, which includes interview clips with Ferry, is available on the DVD, Dylanesque Live: The London Sessions.

== Critical reception ==
Reviewing for AllMusic, critic Stephen Thomas Erlewine wrote of the album, "Ferry has never felt quite so comfortable as he does here, and if that may not be exactly what all listeners are looking for when they listen to his work, this is the quality that will make Dylanesque a small understated gem for certain segments of his die-hard fans."

== Track listing ==
All tracks composed by Bob Dylan, except where noted.

1. "Just Like Tom Thumb's Blues" – 3:50
2. "Simple Twist of Fate" – 5:18
3. "Make You Feel My Love" – 3:22
4. "The Times They Are a-Changin'" – 3:40
5. "All I Really Wanna Do" – 2:29
6. "Knockin' on Heaven's Door" – 6:13
7. "Positively Fourth Street" – 3:45
8. "If Not for You" – 2:40
9. "Baby, Let Me Follow You Down" (Traditional) – 2:13
10. "Gates of Eden" – 5:12
11. "All Along the Watchtower" – 3:46

== Personnel ==
=== Musicians ===
- Bryan Ferry – vocals, Farfisa organ, harmonica, arrangements (9)
- Colin Good – pianos, string arrangements (3, 7)
- Paul Carrack – organ
- Brian Eno – electronics (8)
- Isaac Ferry – electronics (8)
- Leo Abrahams – atmosphere guitars
- Chris Spedding – guitars
- Oliver Thompson – guitars
- David Williams – guitars
- Mick Green – additional guitars (2, 6)
- Robin Trower – acoustic guitar (11)
- Guy Pratt – bass (1, 3–5, 7–11)
- Zev Katz – bass (2, 6)
- Andy Newmark – drums (1, 3–5, 7–11)
- Bobby Irwin – drums (2, 6)
- Frank Ricotti – percussion
- Lucy Wilkins – violin (2)
- Warren Ellis – string arrangements (7)
- Anthony Pleeth – cello (3, 7)
- Jon Thorne – viola (3)
- Jackie Shave – violin (3)
- Gavyn Wright – violin (3)
- Sarah Brown – backing vocals
- Me'sha Bryan – backing vocals
- Michelle John – backing vocals
- Joy Malcolm – backing vocals
- Anna McDonald – backing vocals
- Tara McDonald – backing vocals
- Sharon White – backing vocals

=== Technical ===
- Bryan Ferry – producer
- Rhett Davies – producer
- Colin Good – associate producer
- Neil Broadbank – engineer
- Michael Boddy – engineer
- Chris Mullings – engineer
- Tim Roe – engineer
- Bob Clearmountain – mixing (Note: Mixed at Mix This! (Los Angeles))
- Bob Ludwig – mastering (Note: Mastered at Gateway Mastering (Portland, Maine))
- Isaac Ferry – studio assistant
- James Roper – studio assistant

=== Artwork ===
- Bogdan Zarkowski – design
- Anton Corbijn – cover photography
- Julian Broad – inner sleeve photography
- Rhett Davies – ferris photography
- Philip Lustig – ferris photography
- Pete Turner – ferris photography
- Bryan Ferry – art direction
- Paul Morley – liner notes

== Charts ==
=== Weekly charts ===
Weekly chart performance for Dylanesque
Chart (2007)	Peak position
Austrian Albums (Ö3 Austria)	18
Belgian Albums (Ultratop Flanders)	22
Belgian Albums (Ultratop Wallonia)	49
Dutch Albums (Album Top 100)	15
Danish Albums (Hitlisten)	3
European Albums (Billboard)	10
French Albums (SNEP)	47
German Albums (Offizielle Top 100)	18
Irish Albums (IRMA)	34
Italian Albums (FIMI)	55
Japanese Albums (Oricon)	285
New Zealand Albums (RMNZ)	20
Norwegian Albums (VG-lista)	19
Scottish Albums (OCC)	6
Swedish Albums (Sverigetopplistan)	5
Swiss Albums (Schweizer Hitparade)	50
UK Albums (OCC)	5
US Billboard 200	117

=== Year-end charts ===
Year-end chart performance for Dylanesque
Chart (2007)	Position
Swedish Albums (Sverigetopplistan)	52
UK Albums (OCC)	136

== See also ==
- List of songs written by Bob Dylan
- List of artists who have covered Bob Dylan songs
