= Frantic (album) =

Studio album by Bryan Ferry
- Released: 15 April 2002
- Studios: RAK (London); Studio One (London)
- Genres: Art pop; pop rock
- Length: 47:22
- Label: Virgin
- Producers: Rhett Davies; Bryan Ferry; Colin Good; David A. Stewart; Robin Trower

Bryan Ferry chronology
As Time Goes By (1999)	Frantic (2002)	Dylanesque (2007)

Frantic is the eleventh studio album by the English singer Bryan Ferry, released on 15 April 2002 by Virgin Records. The majority of tracks were produced by the team of Rhett Davies, Colin Good, and Ferry; David A. Stewart and Robin Trower also co-produced several tracks.

Professional ratings
Review scores
Source	Rating
AllMusic	link
Entertainment Weekly	B+ link
PopMatters	Favourable link
Stylus Magazine	A− link

== Critical reception ==
Tim DiGravina of AllMusic wrote of the album, "Some listeners might suggest that an album this varied has an identity crisis, but with [these] standout tracks as glorious as the Dylan covers and the Eno closer, Frantic is a fascinating addition to Bryan Ferry's accomplished discography." David Medsker of PopMatters stated that "Frantic may play like a greatest hits album, with bits here recalling Boys and Girls and songs there echoing late Roxy, and it may rank in the middle to upper of the pack of his overall body of work. But it's the most cohesive album he's done in ages. Given how down and out he appeared to be, the fact that Frantic is more than half good is cause for joy."

== Track listing ==
No.	Title	Writer(s)	Producer(s)	Length
1.	"It's All Over Now, Baby Blue"	Bob Dylan	Davies, Good, Ferry	4:05
2.	"Cruel"	Ferry, David A. Stewart	Davies, Good, Ferry	3:55
3.	"Goin' Down"	Don Nix	Davies, Good, Ferry	3:08
4.	"Goddess of Love"	Ferry, Stewart	Stewart, Ferry	3:33
5.	"Don't Think Twice, It's Alright"	Dylan	Davies, Good, Ferry	4:05
6.	"Nobody Loves Me"	Ferry, Stewart	Davies, Good, Ferry	3:23
7.	"Ja Nun Hons Pris"	Richard Coeur de Lion	Davies, Good, Ferry	0:35
8.	"A Fool for Love"	Ferry	Davies, Good, Ferry	4:44
9.	"Goodnight Irene"	Huddie Ledbetter, Alan Lomax	Ferry, Trower	3:20
10.	"Hiroshima..."	Ferry	Ferry, Trower	3:13
11.	"San Simeon"	Ferry, Stewart	Davies, Good, Ferry	4:36
12.	"One Way Love"	Bert Russell, Norman Meade	Stewart, Ferry	3:05
13.	"I Thought"	Ferry, Brian Eno	Ferry, Trower, Davies, Good	5:40
14.	"I Forgot More Than You'll Ever Know" (Japanese edition bonus track)	Cecil Null	Ferry, Davies, Good

== Personnel ==
=== Musicians ===
- Bryan Ferry – vocals (1–6, 8–13), harmonica (1, 3, 5, 8, 13), keyboards (4, 10, 12, 13), arrangements (7)
- Colin Good – acoustic piano (1–6, 8, 11), string arrangements (1–3, 6, 11, 13), Mellotron (6), virginal (7), arrangements (7), keyboards (13)
- Terry Disley – keyboards (4, 10, 12)
- Brian Eno – keyboards (4, 10, 13), backing vocals (4, 12, 13), guitar (13)
- Paul Taylor – keyboards (4, 10, 12), programming (10)
- Ben Chapman – programming (4, 10, 13)
- Reece Gilmore – programming (4, 12, 13)
- James Sanger – programming (4, 13)
- Eddie LeJeune – accordion (9), backing vocals (9)
- Pete Glenister – guitar (1, 2, 6, 8, 13)
- Mick Green – guitar (1–3, 6, 8, 11)
- Chris Spedding – guitar (2, 4, 6, 8, 12, 13), sitar (11)
- David Williams – guitar (2–4, 6, 12, 13), bass (4)
- Adam Lamprell – guitar (4, 10, 13)
- David A. Stewart – guitar (4, 10, 12)
- Martin Wheatley – guitar (8)
- D. L. Menard – guitar (9), backing vocals (9)
- Jonny Greenwood – guitar (10)
- Robin Trower – guitar (10)
- Zev Katz – bass guitar (1–3, 6, 8, 9, 11, 13)
- Marcus Miller – bass guitar (10, 12)
- Bobby Irwin – drums (1–3, 6, 13)
- Andy Newmark – drums (4, 10, 12), percussion (8, 13)
- Paul Thompson – drums (4, 8), percussion (11)
- Frank Ricotti – percussion (1, 2, 6–9, 11)
- Otis Ferry – whip effects (2)
- Rosie Wetters – cello (1–3, 6, 11, 13)
- Natalia Bonner – viola (1–3, 6, 11, 13)
- Lucy Theo – violin (1–3, 6, 11, 13)
- Lucy Wilkins – violin (1–3, 6, 11, 13)
- Julia Thornton – harp (7, 8)
- Keith Thompson – recorder (7), crumhorn (7), curtal (7), woodwind (8), oboe (11)
- Ken Smith – fiddle (9), backing vocals (9)
- Robert Fowler – alto saxophone (11)
- Sarah Brown – backing vocals (2, 4, 6, 8, 11, 12)
- Kelli Dayton – backing vocals (2, 10, 11)
- Alice Retif – backing vocals (2, 10)
- Audrey Wheeler – backing vocals (2, 4, 12)
- Nicole Blumberg – backing vocals (4)
- Stephen Granville – backing vocals (4, 12)
- Mary Nelson – soprano vocals (7, 8, 11)
- Alison Goldfrapp – backing vocals (11)
- Lucy Kaplansky – backing vocals (11)
- Patti Russo – backing vocals (11)
- Jhelisa Anderson – backing vocals (12)

=== Technical ===
- Bryan Ferry – producer
- Rhett Davies – producer (1–3, 5–8, 11, 13), additional producer (4, 9, 10, 12)
- Colin Good – producer (1–3, 5–8, 11, 13), additional producer (4, 9, 10, 12)
- David A. Stewart – producer (4, 12)
- Robin Trower – producer (9, 10, 13)
- Nick Addison – engineer
- Michael Boddy – engineer
- Neil Brockbank – engineer, mixing (5)
- Ash Howes – engineer, mixing (10)
- Richard T. Norris – engineer
- Sven Taits – engineer
- Mark Tucker – engineer
- Dan Grech-Marguerat – assistant engineer
- Kevin Harp – assistant engineer
- Bob Clearmountain – mixing (1–4, 6–9, 11–13)
- Bob Ludwig – mastering at Gateway Mastering (Portland, Maine)

=== Artwork ===
- Bogdan Zarkowski – design, photography
- Nicholas De Ville – design
- Bryan Ferry – design
- Eric Boman – photography
- Albert Sanchez – photography

== Charts ==
Chart performance for Frantic
Chart (2002)	Peak position
Austrian Albums (Ö3 Austria)	6
Belgian Albums (Ultratop Flanders)	5
Czech Albums (ČNS IFPI)	78
Danish Albums (Hitlisten)	22
Dutch Albums (Album Top 100)	78
European Albums (Music & Media)	7
French Albums (SNEP)	37
German Albums (Offizielle Top 100)	12
Irish Albums (IRMA)	61
Italian Albums (Musica e dischi)	46
Norwegian Albums (VG-lista)	4
Scottish Albums (Official Charts)	8
Swedish Albums (Sverigetopplistan)	10
Swiss Albums (Schweizer Hitparade)	26
UK Albums (Official Charts)	6
US Billboard 200	189
