= In Your Mind (album) =

Studio album by Bryan Ferry
- Released: February 1977
- Recorded: 1976–1977
- Studio: AIR (London)
- Genre: Rock; pop
- Length: 36:05
- Label: E.G.
- Producer: Bryan Ferry; Steve Nye

Bryan Ferry chronology
Let's Stick Together (1976)	In Your Mind (1977)	The Bride Stripped Bare (1978)

In Your Mind is the fourth solo studio album by the English singer and songwriter Bryan Ferry. It was his first solo album of all original songs.

As Ferry's first solo all-original LP effort, released after Ferry's band Roxy Music went on a four-year hiatus, it was supported by an extensive tour.

== Critical reception ==
Professional ratings
Review scores
Source	Rating
AllMusic	3/5 stars
Christgau's Record Guide	B+
The Rolling Stone Album Guide	3.5/5 stars

The Village Voice's Robert Christgau wrote in his review of In Your Mind: "Ferry has custom-designed a new line of songs for his solo concept, rather than borrowing from early Roxy or his humble forebears, and especially on side one the stuff is appealingly down-to-earth." In 1992's The Rolling Stone Album Guide, Mark Coleman said: "In Your Mind strives for the windswept, bracing impact of Roxy Music's classic Siren. The surfeit of Ferry's compositions is gratifying, though even the hookiest ('Tokyo Joe', 'Party Doll') merely restate Roxy's familiar romantic and musical themes."

AllMusic critic Ned Raggett wrote that In Your Mind "remains the secret highlight of Ferry's musical career, an energetic album that would have received far more attention as a full Roxy release."

== Track listing ==
All tracks are written by Bryan Ferry, except where noted.

No.	Title	Writer(s)	Length
1.	"This Is Tomorrow"		3:40
2.	"All Night Operator"		3:08
3.	"One Kiss"		3:35
4.	"Love Me Madly Again"		7:26
5.	"Tokyo Joe"		3:55
6.	"Party Doll"		4:32
7.	"Rock of Ages"	Ferry; Chris Thomas	4:31
8.	"In Your Mind"		5:18

== Personnel ==
Note: The LP's sleeve notes includes "thanks" to a list of musicians. Only their names are mentioned, whilst their instruments and the exact songs on which they play are not. The following list merely tentatively mentions the instruments the same musicians have played on other Ferry records.

- Bryan Ferry – vocals, keyboards
- David Skinner – acoustic piano
- Neil Hubbard – guitars
- Phil Manzanera – guitars
- Chris Spedding – guitars
- John Porter – bass
- John Wetton – bass
- Paul Thompson – drums
- Ray Cooper – percussion
- Morris Pert – percussion
- Mel Collins – saxophones, horn arrangements
- Chris Mercer – saxophones, horn arrangements
- Martin Drover – trumpet
- Ann Odell – string arrangements
- Dyan Birch – backing vocals
- Doreen Chanter – backing vocals
- Helen Chappelle – backing vocals
- Frankie Collins – backing vocals
- Preston Hayward – backing vocals
- Paddie McHugh – backing vocals
- Jacqui Sullivan – backing vocals

== Production ==
- Bryan Ferry – producer
- Steve Nye – producer, engineer
- Ross Cullum – assistant engineer
- Nigel Walker – assistant engineer
- Nick de Ville – design
- Bob Bowkett (C.C.S.) – artwork
- Monty Coles – photography

== Charts ==
=== Weekly charts ===
Chart (1977)	Peak position
Australian Albums (Kent Music Report)	2
Austrian Albums (Ö3 Austria)	17
Dutch Albums (Album Top 100)	8
Japanese Albums (Oricon)	96
New Zealand Albums (RMNZ)	16
Norwegian Albums (VG-lista)	12
Swedish Albums (Sverigetopplistan)	4
UK Albums (Official Charts)	5
US Billboard 200	126

=== Year-end charts ===
Chart (1977)	Peak position
Australian Albums (Kent Music Report)	8

== Certifications ==
Region	Certification	Certified units/sales
United Kingdom (BPI)	Gold	100,000^{^}
^{^} Shipments figures based on certification alone.
