= Nick de Ville =

British artist (born 1944)

Nicholas (Nick) de Ville (born 1944) is a British graphic artist and academic. He is best known through his cover art for Roxy Music. He became a departmental head at Goldsmiths College in 1987.

== Early life ==
In an interview, de Ville stated that "I was born in a small town, rural Staffordshire, in the Midlands." His parents were Geoffrey Ham De Ville (or Deville) (1909–1986), a butcher in Uttoxeter, and his wife whom he married in 1932 Gladys Joan Babb (born 1911); the cricketer Roger de Ville was his elder brother. The family home was Honeycroft, Bank Close, Uttoxeter, and Nick submitted a "Still Life" to the Royal Academy from there in 1963.

De Ville appeared in a school play at Abbotsholme School in 1955, which he attended from 1953 to 1962. He commented "I left school about 1962, and I went to study architecture at Manchester University. And I was there for two terms, and I realized I was not enjoying it. So then I came back home and I went to the local art school for two years."

== Influence of Richard Hamilton ==
After two years of study at Derby College of Art, de Ville arrived at the Fine Art department of Newcastle University in autumn 1965. There he fell under the influence of Richard Hamilton, on the teaching staff until the following year. Hamilton later listed egregious Newcastle art alumni as "Roy Ascott, Tony Carter, Nick de Ville, Rita Donagh, Noel Forster, Mali Morris, Matt Rugg, Ian Stephenson, John A. Walker and Mary Webb."

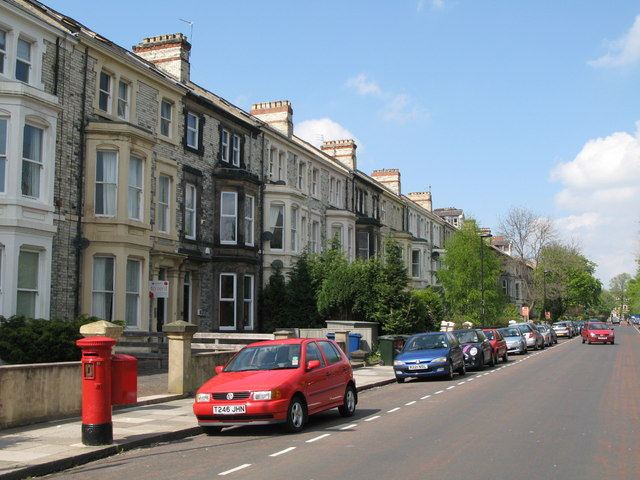
Eslington Terrace, Newcastle, 2009 photograph

In lodgings in Newcastle, de Ville lived almost adjacent to Bryan Ferry and Tim Head in Eslington Terrace; they were two more art students in Hamilton's orbit. De Ville became a close friend of both. Graduating in 1969, de Ville took a lecturing position at Derby for two years, but also maintained links. He worked as a studio assistant to Hamilton. He made his way to London with a position at Goldsmiths in 1971. He was responsible for the first Roxy Music album cover (1972), using the fashion photographer Karl Stoecker, also for subsequent covers, and became the band's art director.

== Academic ==
For the decade 1971 to 1981, de Ville taught part-time at Goldsmiths, Derby and other art colleges. He moved up, to be Course Director of the Fine Art Masters course director at Goldsmiths, from 1982 to 1991, from 1987 also head of Fine Art there, to 1997. He was then appointed Director of Research in the Department of Art, and in 2004 Head of Department of Art.

== Works ==
- Lenare, the Art of Society Photography, 1924–1977 (1981), with introductory essay by Anthony Haden-Guest
- Catalogue essay for Gerard Hemsworth, Strictly Suburban (1999)
- Album: Style and Image in Sleeve Design (2003)

Edited:

- Space Invaders: Issues of Presentation, Context and Meaning in Contemporary Art (1993), with Stephen C. Foster
- The Artist and the Academy: Issues in Fine Art Education and the Wider Cultural Context (1994), with Stephen C. Foster
