= Nigel Greenwood (art dealer) =

British art dealer (1941–2004)

- Born: Nigel Palin Greenwood; 28 May 1941; Plymouth, England
- Died: 14 April 2004 (aged 62)
- Education: Courtauld Institute
- Occupation: Art Dealer

Nigel Palin Greenwood (28 May 1941 – 14 April 2004) was a British art dealer.

== Early career ==
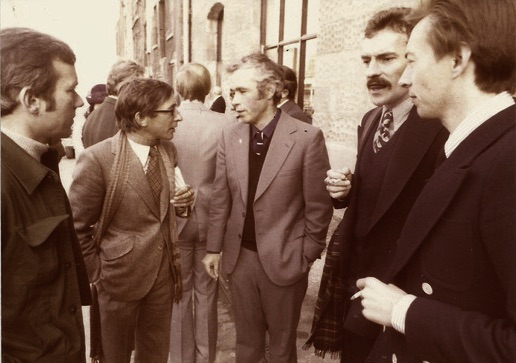
Nigel Greenwood (second from right) with fellow art dealers and artists at the reopening of the Arnolfini, Bristol, in 1975

Nigel Greenwood was born in Plymouth and educated at Christ Church, Oxford (reading history) and at the Courtauld Institute (art history). He started his career in the art world at the Axiom Gallery in London. In 1968 he participated in the exhibition "Prospect" in Düsseldorf.

In 1970 he started his own gallery at 60 Glebe Place, Chelsea, where he presented work by Gilbert & George (the famous "Underneath the Arches/Singing Sculptures" performance), Keith Milow, John Walker, Ed Ruscha and Mino Argento.

== Pioneering gallerist ==
In 1971 the gallery established itself at 41 Sloane Gardens. Alongside the Lisson, the Situation gallery and Jack Wendler, Nigel Greenwood Inc Ltd, as the gallery was named, became the fourth London gallery to play a crucial part in introducing emerging artists to the art world. Greenwood enjoyed visiting the studios of younger artists, and presenting their work in solo shows. Gilbert & George, Keith Milow, David Tremlett, Rita Donagh, Alan Johnston and later Christopher le Brun, and Dhruva Mistry all showed first with Greenwood. He also worked with American artists, Bruce Nauman and Ed Ruscha, German artists Bernd and Hilla Becher and the Italian artist Mino Argento.

In 1985 the gallery moved to New Burlington Street. Greenwood continued to show his favoured artists and added new names including German painter Jörg Immendorff, Swiss artist Martin Disler, and Danish artist Per Kirkeby. By now Greenwood was recognised as a major player in the British art world. In 1985 he was invited to select the Hayward Gallery Annual Exhibition, the only dealer to be asked to do so.

The financial collapse of the Greenwood gallery came in 1992 as a result of a general downturn in the art market disturbed the London art world. The contents of the gallery were sold by Sothebys. After this, Nigel Greenwood worked as a private dealer and adviser (to the Tate Gallery, amongst others).

== Tributes ==
Sir Nicholas Serota, director of the Tate Galleries, wrote in his obituary in The Guardian:

His tastes were broad, and he showed a bewildering, even erratic, range of artists, all of whom, like himself, were marked by their independent-mindedness. He was one of the few British gallerists to look as much to Europe as to America in the 1970s, as enthusiastic for unknown artists as for those with international reputations. (...) He went his own way. He may have been better at discovering artists than keeping them, but if not for him several major careers would not have been launched, others would not have been sustained through lean years, and for two decades his gallery made the British art world a better place.

Adrian Searle, chief art critic of The Guardian and formerly a painter, wrote:

Nigel Greenwood gave me my first solo show, in 1988, I think to our mutual surprise. Getting him to come to my studio was a frustrating business of cancelled appointments. When he finally made it, he accidentally broke my coffee pot, got paint on his trousers and found he had locked himself out of his car. He gave me the show anyway.

Catherine Lampert wrote in her obituary in The Independent:

The pinnacle of his respect was always reserved for living artists, and others listened to learn who deserved such elevation.

The Nigel Greenwood Gallery Archive remains as part of the Special Collections at Chelsea College of Arts Library.
