= Edward F. Albee Foundation =

Arts foundation on Long Island, US

- Formation: 1967 (59 years ago)
- Type: Nonprofit 501(c)(3) organization
- Purpose: To serve writers and visual artists from all walks of life, by providing time and space in which to work without disturbance
- Website: albeefoundation.org

The Edward F. Albee Foundation is an arts foundation created with the intent of aiding young visual artists and writers.

Located in Montauk on Long Island, New York, United States, it was started by its namesake, playwright Edward Albee, in 1967, after revenue from his Tony Award–winning play Who's Afraid of Virginia Woolf? proved abundant.

== History and operations ==
Location of The Barn in Montauk

The foundation maintains the William Flanagan Memorial Creative Persons Center, also called The Barn, as a residence for writers, painters and sculptors. The center is named after composer William Flanagan, Albee's long-time romantic partner. The Barn is located approximately two miles from the center of Montauk and the Atlantic Ocean. The residency program is in a secluded knoll offering privacy and a peaceful atmosphere.

Edward Albee created the foundation to provide an alternative to residencies that often served more established or successful applicants. "We thought that maybe we should do two things here – get people at the cusp, young people, before they necessarily had made it, or occasionally people who were older who had been forgotten and whose careers hadn't gone so well, but were still doing interesting work, because they could teach the younger people."

Some notable writers and artists who have attended in past years include:

- Christopher Durang – playwright
- Will Eno – playwright
- Spalding Gray – actor, writer
- Tom Holmes – artist
- A. M. Homes – writer
- Keith Milow – artist
- Honor Molloy – playwright
- Mia Westerlund Roosen – sculptor
- Sean Scully – artist

== Renovations ==
The Barn was renovated and completed in 2024. The 3,300-square-foot (310 m^{2}) structure houses the residents' rooms and studio space for writers and artists to live and work. It was a former horse stable for the Montauk Manor, dating back to the 1920s and used for the residencies fifty years prior to the renovations. The rehabilitated barn has new dormers, windows, doors and an outdoor terrace.

The new interior has accessible 21st-century workspaces, an accessible elevator, a kitchen and a shared library that houses many of Albee's own books and records. The updated and modernized facilities expanded the residency from a seasonal operation to year-round. The work minimized impact on existing wetlands, which were protected and restored with native plantings. A 1,400-square-foot (130 m^{2}) cottage was also renovated as a residence for the property's caretaker. TenBerke was the architectural firm and John Hummel and Associates the general contractor.

== See also ==
- Artist-in-residence
- List of foundations
