= Dennis Osadebe =

Nigerian artist (born 1991)

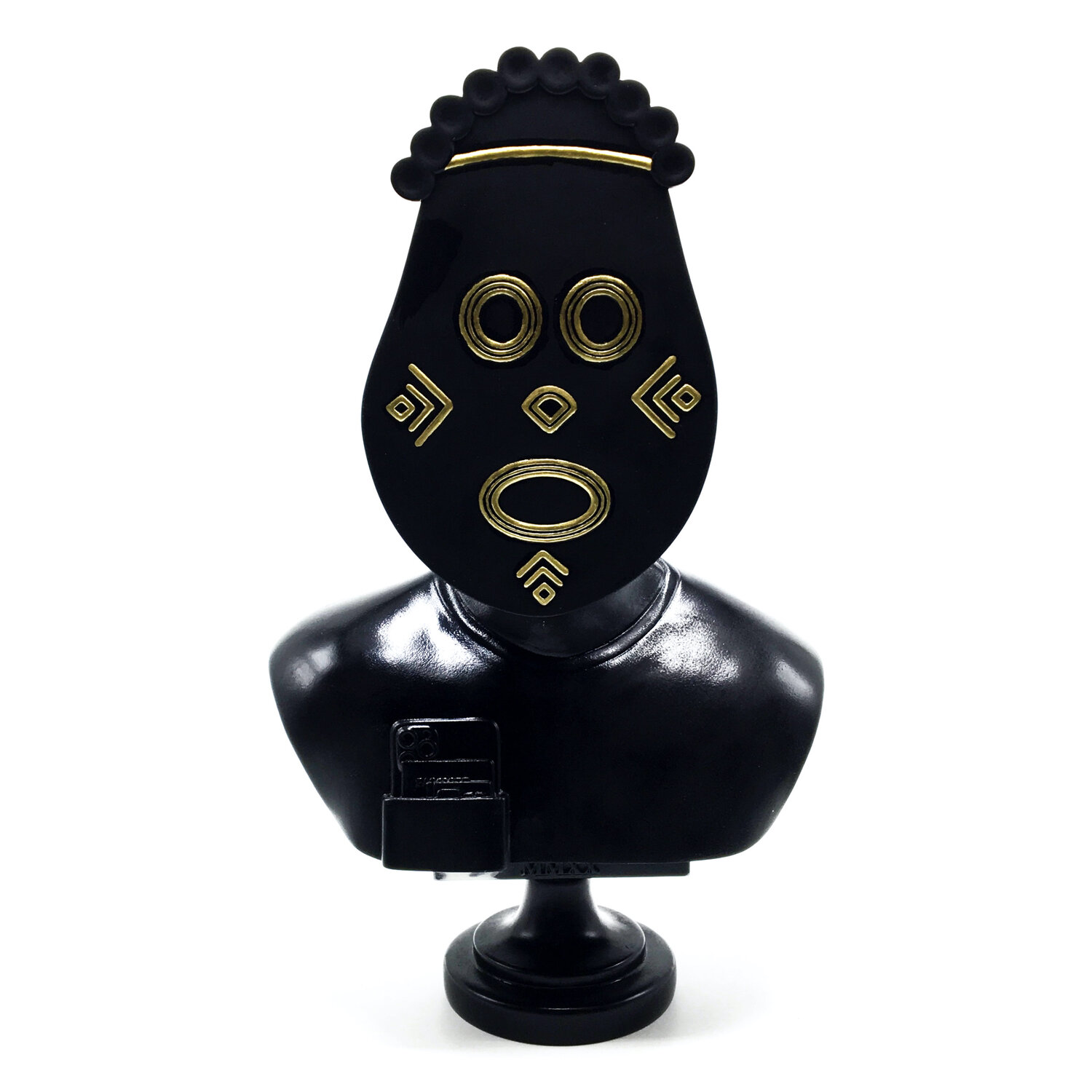
- Portrait of a Modern Man, 2020, by Dennis Osadebe
- Born: 1991 (age 34–35); Lagos
- Education: Queen Mary, University of London; University of Warwick, Coventry

Dennis Osadebe (born 1991) is a Nigerian mixed-media artist and sculptor living in Lagos known for his mixed-media paintings and sculpture. His practice utilises a personal iconography that explores heritage, technology and the possibilities of humanity. Osadebe coined the cultural movement 'Neo-Africa', as a response to the limiting nature of the term 'African Art', as a means to encourage others to rebrand tradition in a way that reflects the transforming world.

== Life and work ==
Osadebe was born in Lagos in 1991. He obtained a Bachelor of Science degree in Business Management from Queen Mary, University of London in 2012 and went on to receive a Master of Science degree from the University of Warwick, Coventry. In 2016, Osadebe began forging his career in the arts, and found a hostility in approaching this career without a traditional arts education background, due to the lack of accessibility in gallery and museum environments. This factor has been a driving force in Osadebe creating work which empowers the viewer, by allowing them to only have to bring themselves in order to experience and enjoy art.

His work has been featured in several exhibitions including the Avenue des Arts in Los Angeles, solo exhibition in South Korea, Portrait Of a Bright Generation at Galerie Liusa Wang in Paris, Investec Cape Town (Art Fair) in South Africa and a Spectacular Now (Duo Show) with Evans Mbugua at Nairobi.

He produced a video presentation for Expo 2020's Pre-Expo Space Week event.

== Artistic Work ==
Osadebe's vibrant post-pop style aims to reimagine his heritage and experiences through the use of positive, provocative, progressive imagery, and narratives, creating a dialogue where tradition meets invention and innovation. The works depict scenes of every day life, which are drawn from the artists own experiences and are both personal and relatable to current society, while presented in a modern context.

Osadebe is influenced by artists such as David Hockney, Kerry James Marshal, Michael Craig-Martin, and Roy Lichtenstein in their bold aesthetic.

=== Painting ===
Osadebe's mixed-media paintings are created digitally, specified areas of the canvas are then adorned with acrylic paint. Each work is therefore rendered as unique, as the artist removes any possibility for digital reproduction. Osadebe refers to his visual style of working as "NEO" which is modern, bright, and expressive. This style is characterised by blocks of vibrant colour, geometric shapes, minimalism and characters in hypnotic outfits, which act as a set of visual emblems.

Through juxtaposing elements of the past alongside the present, while utilizing his Nigerian heritage as a starting point, Osadebe places his background and experiences in the context of the future and its limitless possibilities. Osadebe's practice is loaded with provocative surrealism, meaningful symbolism, and playful humour, presenting itself as a continuing investigation of the relationship between the traditional and contemporary. The paintings are intended to act as a connector, through suggesting a new type of spirituality bound by the technologies of our digital age. Masks and helmets are repeated motifs found throughout Osadebe's body of work, they are presented as a reference to the role of technology within our daily lives, as well as an apparatus for disguising the characters in the paintings, which allows viewers to project themselves onto the work as a result of this anonymity.

=== Sculpture ===
The repeated motifs of masks are explored further through Osadebe's sculptures, which are busts of characters with their faces concealed by an interpretation of traditional African masks. The sculptures utilise the artists bold colour palette, and are fabricated using bronze and 3D printing. The series, Stand For Something (2019), allows the viewer to consider what they stand for, while visually reflecting the urban and traditional cultures of Nigeria in unison.
