= The Gallery, London =

Art gallery and conceptual art project

Coordinates: 51.5210°N 0.1681°W

The Gallery was an art gallery and conceptual art project constructed and devised by the artist Nicholas Wegner, later in partnership with artist Vaughan Grylls which ran from 1973 to 1978. The Gallery was located on Lisson Street in London and presented a series of projects critiquing and satirising trends in the 1970s UK art-world. Later projects included those by artists including John Latham, Rita Donagh, Gerald Newman and Stephen Willats.
