= Koszewski =

Koszewski (feminine Koszewska) is a Polish surname. Notable persons with this name include:

- Andrzej Koszewski (1922–2015), Polish composer
- Dietmar Koszewski (born 1967), German hurdler
- Irvin Koszewski (1924–2009), American bodybuilder
- Waldemar Koszewski (born 1959), Polish physician, neurosurgeon and neurotraumatologist, academic teacher and lecturer
