= Keith Milow =

British artist (born 1945)

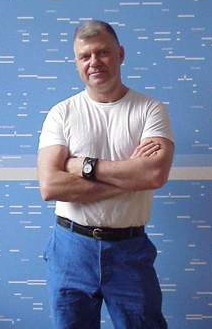
- Born: 29 December 1945 (age 80); London, England
- Education: Camberwell School of Art (1962–1967); Royal College of Art (1967–1982)
- Known for: Painting, printmaking, sculpture
- Movement: Post-minimalism
- Awards: Calouste Gulbenkian Foundation award (1976); Arts Council of Great Britain major award (1979); Edward Albee Foundation award (1983)

Keith Milow (born 29 December 1945) is a British artist. He grew up in Baldock, Hertfordshire, and lived in London (1962–1980), New York City (1980–2002) and Amsterdam (2002–2014), now lives in London. He is an abstract sculptor, painter and printmaker. His work has been characterised as architectural, monumental, procedural, enigmatic and poetical.

== Biography ==
Keith Milow was educated at The Knights Templar School in Baldock, Camberwell School of Art, 1962–1967, and Royal College of Art, 1967–1968. In 1970 he received a Gregory Fellowship from Leeds University, which was followed in 1972 by a Harkness Fellowship to the USA.

During the 1970s, Milow was considered part of the British artistic avant-garde along with artists such as Richard Long, Gilbert & George, Michael Craig-Martin, Mark Lancaster, Tim Head, Nicholas Pope, John Walker, David Tremlett, Barry Flanagan, Art & Language and Derek Jarman. According to art historian Jo Melvin, Milow "helped to shape and define a critical period of new and experimental art practices in Britain when the distinctions between painting and sculpture and equally importantly between figuration and abstract collapsed".

Throughout his career Keith Milow has been pre-occupied with the form of the Latin cross which resulted in several hundred cross sculptures as well as drawings. During the 1990s, he produced series of disc-shaped sculptures ('tondi') that pay tribute to what he considered the great artists of the 20th century. Paintings from this period frequently contain names from this personal canon of modern art. Some of his painting and drawing demonstrate a mathematical precision that has the appearance of being computer-generated. Often his work is the result of a direct response to other artists' oeuvres, notably the Dutch painter Piet Mondrian. In the words of Jo Melvin: "Milow's work is infused in the history of painting, the subject of painting and its meaning. Something else slips through in the game of chance. It is a piece of magic – the combination of mystery with structure, order and process".

Awards included the Calouste Gulbenkian Foundation Award (1976), the Arts Council of Great Britain Major Award (1979), the Edward Albee Foundation Award (1983) and the Pollock-Krasner Foundation Award (2017). In 2015, he was nominated for the Charles Wollaston Award of the Royal Academy Summer Exhibition and in 2017 for the Daiwa Foundation Art Prize.

== Exhibitions ==
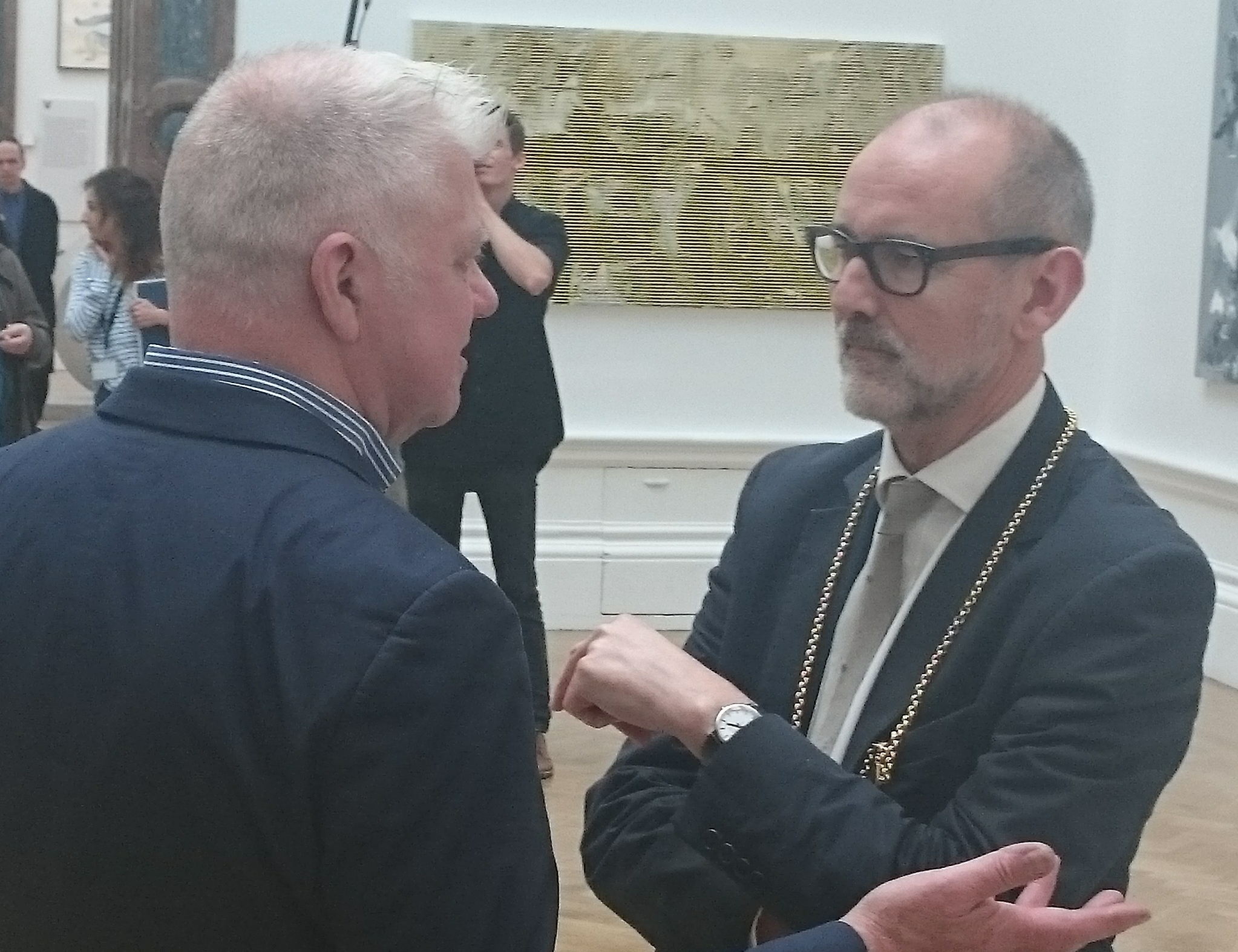
Keith Milow and Christopher Le Brun at the Royal Academy Summer Exhibition, 2015. In the background Milow's painting First and last

In 1970 Keith Milow had his first solo show with Nigel Greenwood Gallery, an exhibition that sold out with Tate being one of the buyers. Greenwood continued to show Milow until 1992. Other galleries that held solo exhibitions of his work include Duffy & Sons, New York (1973), Hester Van Royen Gallery, London (1975), Kettle's Yard Gallery, Cambridge (1976), Gallerie Albert Baronian, Brussels (1977), Park Square Gallery, Leeds (1977), Roundhouse Gallery, London (1978), Galerie Loyse Oppenheim, Geneva (1979), Annina Nosei Gallery, New York (1981, 1982), Alexander Wood Gallery, New York (1987), John Davis Gallery, New York (1988), Gallery 630B, New Orleans (1990), Nohra Haime Gallery, New York (1990–99), Aicart & Aijtink, Hilversum (2007–13), and Dadiani Fine Art, London (2017).

Group exhibitions included the 'Young Contemporaries' at Tate Britain (1967), 'Six at the Hayward', Hayward Gallery (1969), ' Works on Paper', Museum of Modern Art (1971), British exhibition, Art Basel (1975), 'Arte Inglese Oggi', Palazzo Reale, Milan (1976), 'British Painting 1952–1977', Royal Academy of Arts (1977), 'British Art Now', Solomon R. Guggenheim Museum (1980), 'Aspects of British Art Today', Tokyo Metropolitan Art Museum (1982), ' Modern British Sculpture', Whitechapel Gallery (1986), 'Modern British Sculpture', Tate Liverpool (1988), 'Contemporary British Artists: Mirror up to Nature', Denver Art Museum (1998), 'United Enemies: Sculpture in 1960s and 1970s Britain', Henry Moore Institute (2011–12), 'Royal Academy Summer Exhibition', Royal Academy of Arts (2015–17, 2019), and 'BP Portrait Award', National Portrait Gallery (2019).

== Collections ==
Works of Milow are included in public collections, such as Tate Galleries, Imperial War Museum, Henry Moore Foundation, Leeds City Art Gallery, Scottish National Gallery of Modern Art, Museum of Fine Arts (Budapest), Museum of Modern Art (NYC), Guggenheim Museum, Walker Art Center, Dallas Museum of Art, Denver Art Museum, Art Gallery of Ontario, National Gallery of Australia and Art Gallery of South Australia. An important commission of 1998 was the piece 20th Century – Thames, consisting of four large tondi in the lobby of One Canada Square (Canary Wharf, London).

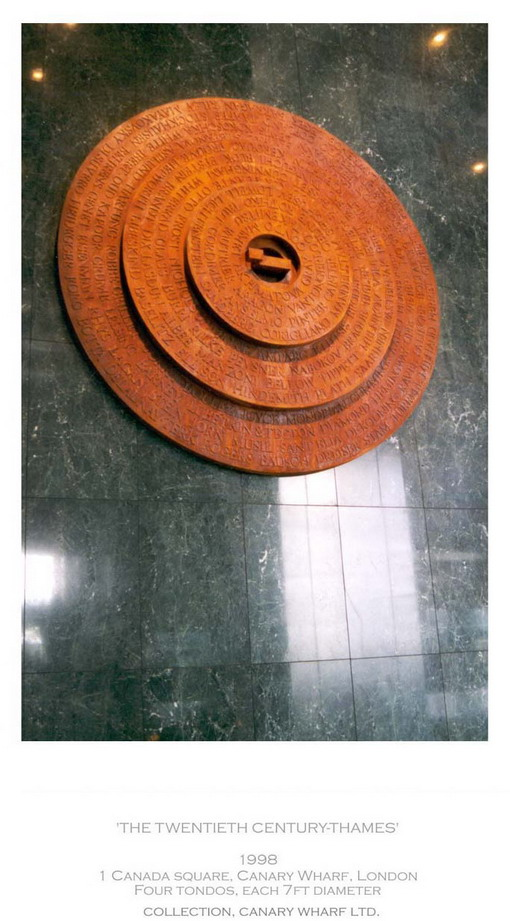
20th Century – Thames, 1998

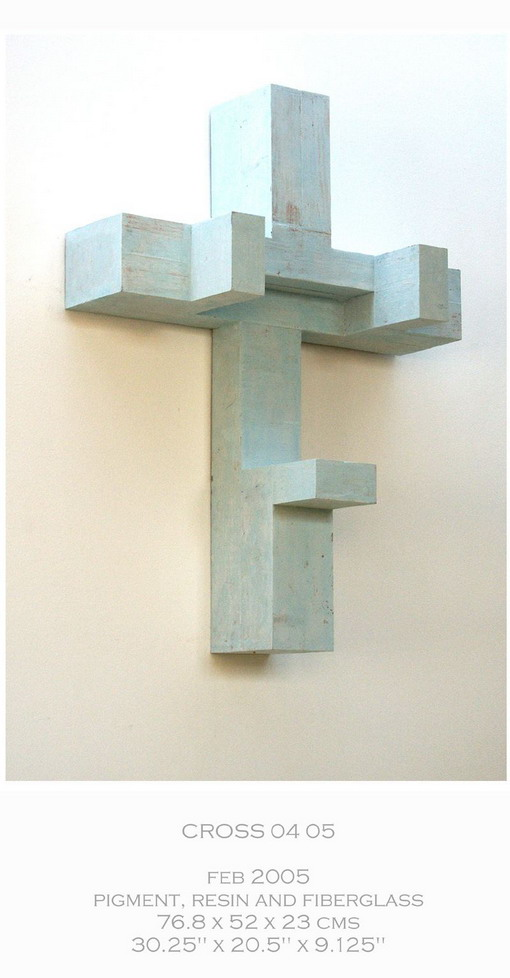
Cross sculpture, 2005

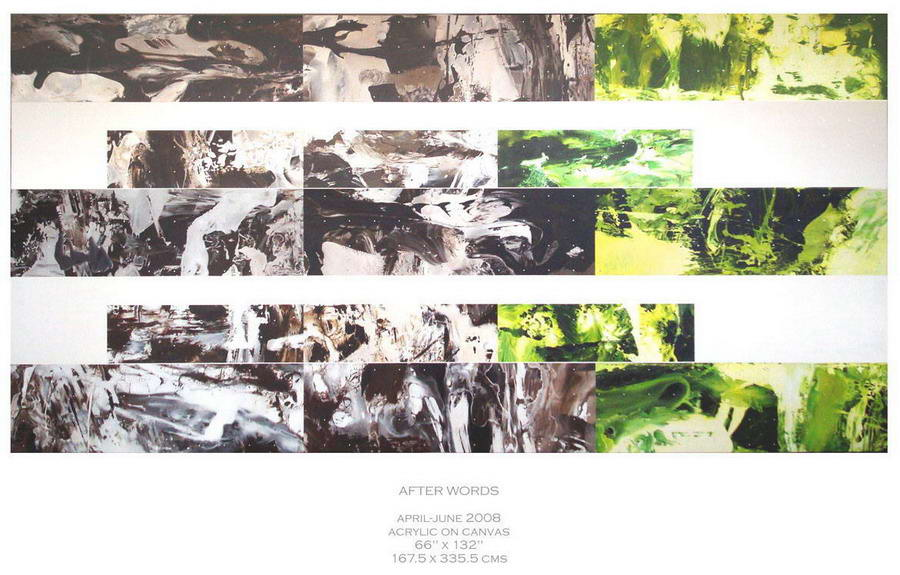
After Words, 2008

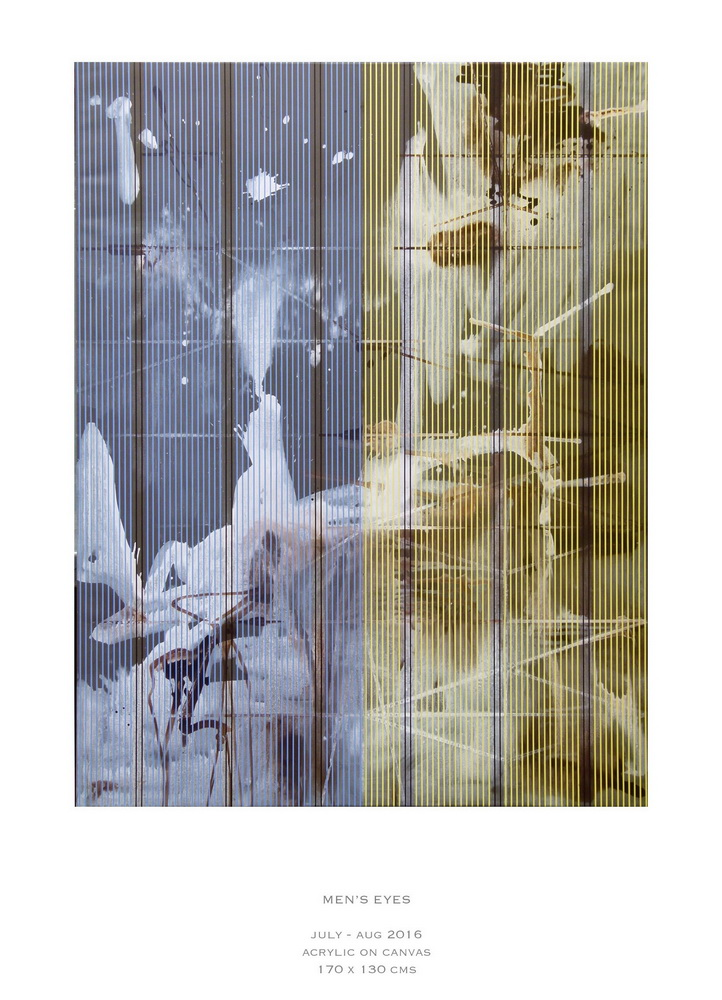
Men's Eyes, 2016

== Sources ==
- Debrett's People of Today 2006, ed. Charles Mosley, London 2006 (page 1134)
- Waldman, Diane (1987): Emerging Artists 1978–1986, Selections from the Exxon series. Exhibition catalogue Solomon K. Guggenheim Museum, New York. ISBN 0-89207-063-6 (page 117)
