= Natalie Finnemore =

British visual artist (born 1988)

Natalie Finnemore (born 1988) is a British visual artist who creates sculptural installations. Finnemore's artistic practice utilises drawing, printmaking, painting and sculpture. Her sculptural work is influenced by design, and explores the viewer's expectations or relationship with form, function and play.

== Early life and education ==
Finnemore studied a foundation year in Art and Design at the Cumbria Institute of Arts, University of Cumbria, and completed a BA Fine Art degree at Sheffield Hallam University in 2011.

== Career ==
Finnemore was selected to participate in the Bloomberg New Contemporaries 2012, a yearly platform for promising recent fine art graduates in the UK.

Following her degree Finnemore was selected to take part in the S1 Studio Bursary Programme 2011, at S1 Artspace in Sheffield. This was a professional development scheme which included associated artists such as Haroon Mirza, James Clarkson and Simon Bill. Finnemore then become a permanent studio holder at S1 Artspace, and took part in various exhibitions hosted by S1 Artspace including Three Act Structure, 2014, and I Can Read With My Eyes Shut, 2016. Finnemore currently works from Exchange Place Studios, Sheffield, run by Yorkshire Artspace.

In 2019 Finnemore was selected, alongside four other artists, to be awarded a grant and a place on the Associate Artist programme as part of Yorkshire Sculpture International festival 2019, which offered artist development and mentoring. Through this Finnemore teamed up with John Lewis & Partners to present a sculptural installation in their Leeds city centre store. The result of this commission, entitled Support Structures, was exhibited in the ground floor window and second floor, and addressed Finnemore's interest in 'functional sculpture and non-functional design' and incorporated products from the John Lewis store display. Finnemore also exhibited in the Associated Matter exhibition at Yorkshire Sculpture Park, alongside the other YSI Associate artists.

Finnemore has developed a number of sculptural installations which encourage playful interactions with the objects from the public. She uses her research into 'elements of design that are used to manipulate the user's behaviour' to create sculptural objects which impact the behaviour of the audience. In 2015 Finnemore collaborated with design agency Lyon & Lyon to make a piece of modular furniture that encourages creative play for The Tetley gallery in Leeds. During summer 2017 Finnemore was invited by The Hepworth Wakefield to devise and run a series of workshops with year 6 students from a local primary school exploring how to make sculpture that can be played with and on. Finnemore went on to create a large sculptural installation for playing on inspired by the student's ideas outdoors at The Hepworth Wakefield. In 2017 Finnemore took part in the group exhibition Leisure Time at S1 Artspace in Sheffield. The show explored the concept of leisure within the Buahaus curriculum. Finnemore's sculpture, ‘Function: Grasping/Movement Ability Developing’, a group of soft pillow rings, invited visitors to rest upon them and make use of their function to provide comfort.

== Selected group exhibitions ==
- Associated Matter, Yorkshire Sculpture Park, Wakefield, 2019
- Construction House: Leisure Time, S1 Artspace, Sheffield, 2018
- Everything Flows, Millennium Gallery, Sheffield, 2017
- Drawing for Sculpture, 20-21 Visual Arts Centre, Scunthorpe, 2017
- Left Hand to Back of Head, Object Held Against Right Thigh, Bluecoat Gallery, Liverpool, 2016
- Think.Play.Do, The Tetley, Leeds, 2015
- Bloomberg New Contemporaries, ICA, London, 2012-2013

== Awards ==
- Yorkshire Sculpture International, Associate Artist, 2019
- The Penthouse Residency, The Penthouse, Manchester, 2013
- S1 Artspace Bursary Award programme, 2011
- Bloomberg New Contemporaries 2012
