= New Contemporaries =

British art organisation

New Contemporaries is an organisation in the UK that works to support emerging artists at the beginning of their careers by introducing them to the visual arts sector and to the public through a variety of platforms, including an annual exhibition. Artists, whether still studying or having recently graduated, are given opportunities to make contacts and gain professional experience outside of their educational institutions. For the annual exhibition, artists are invited to submit a portfolio of work, from which a selection is made by a panel of judges. The selection is made by artists and writers, and often the selector will have previously been exhibited in a New Contemporaries show.

Founded in 1949 as the "Young Contemporaries", the exhibition has run annually as a means to provide an impartial and democratic stepping stone from arts education to the professional art sector. Established hierarchies that might otherwise become set within the art school system are able to be assessed without bias through the anonymous selection process.

Selectors have in the past included Ryan Gander (2013), Rosalind Nashashibi (2012), Pablo Bronstein (2011), Michael Landy (2007), Angus Fairhurst (2006), Jane and Louise Wilson (2005), Tacita Dean (2004), Rebecca Warren (2003), Sarah Lucas (2002), Chris Ofili (2001), Gavin Turk (2000), and Susan Hiller (1999).

An annual exhibition for the final selection of New Contemporaries is staged in a leading UK arts venue; New Contemporaries has exhibited as part of the Liverpool Biennial since its launch in 1999. The importance of regional impartiality is recognised in the anonymity of the contributor's school, age, and nationality during the selection process and by the annual exhibition having no fixed location. A catalogue is printed to accompany the exhibition each year.

== Background ==
=== 1949–1970 ===
The first annual exhibition, initiated by Carel Weight for the Royal Society of British Artists (RBA) Galleries, was established in 1949 and known as 'Young Contemporaries'. In the foreword to the 1949 exhibition catalogue, Philip Hendy, then Director of the National Gallery, wrote of his "hope that it is only the first of many. That it may grown into an annual event." The early exhibition gathered much critical and audience attention. Howard Hodgkin recollected that “the most memorable event at the opening of the first show was the speech made by Philip Hendy. With extraordinary generosity and frankness and somehow with a lot of sympathy as well, he compared what he felt to be the bleak but possible heroic fate awaiting us when we left Art School to the cosy, hierarchical life of an Art Historian.”

From 1949 until 1969, the contributors were selected by artists and art specialists, but then in 1969 and 1970 students controlled selection themselves. Notable artists who participated in these early exhibitions include Eduardo Paolozzi (1958), Dorothy Mead (1959, the first woman president and later the first woman president of the London Group), David Hockney (1960), Patrick Caulfield (1961), Ray Atkins (1964), Robyn Denny (1964), Keith Milow (1967), Derek Jarman (1967) and Gerard Hemsworth (1967). Andrew Lambirth wrote in 1986 that “it wasn't until 1969 that the year that the colour cover of the catalogue looked like an Alpine Advertisement for poster paint – that the students decided to take over selection themselves. This controversial move was the logical if belated reaction to establishment colonization of the YC. Wasn't the whot supposed to be for the students, by the students?” The 1970 exhibition, held at the Royal Academy, caused great controversy with one of the events nearly setting fire to the Royal Academy. Other sources claim funding was withdrawn because the organisation had dissolved into strife between college factions. The exhibition was not staged again until 1974.

=== 1974–1986 ===
In 1973, tutors from some London colleges - including Gillian Ayres, Paul Huxley and William Tucker – grouped together to restore the exhibition. They took a year to draw up a new constitution, arrange a willing venue, and organise the selection process. Taking place at the Camden Arts Centre in 1974, the exhibition was renamed New Contemporaries.

The Guardian reviewed the 1975 show as being “low on razzmatazz and high on endeavour”. William Tucker wrote in the catalogue introduction that “the successful student these days is likely to be persuaded that is he an artist. Nothing could be further from the truth. What the NC should do is enable students, for a moment at last as artists, to take public responsibility for what that have made – absolutely... This is not an exhibition of protest, but could become the opportunity for commitment. It is the harder role.”

The 1976 exhibition was staged at the Acme Gallery, 43 Shelton Street, Covent Garden

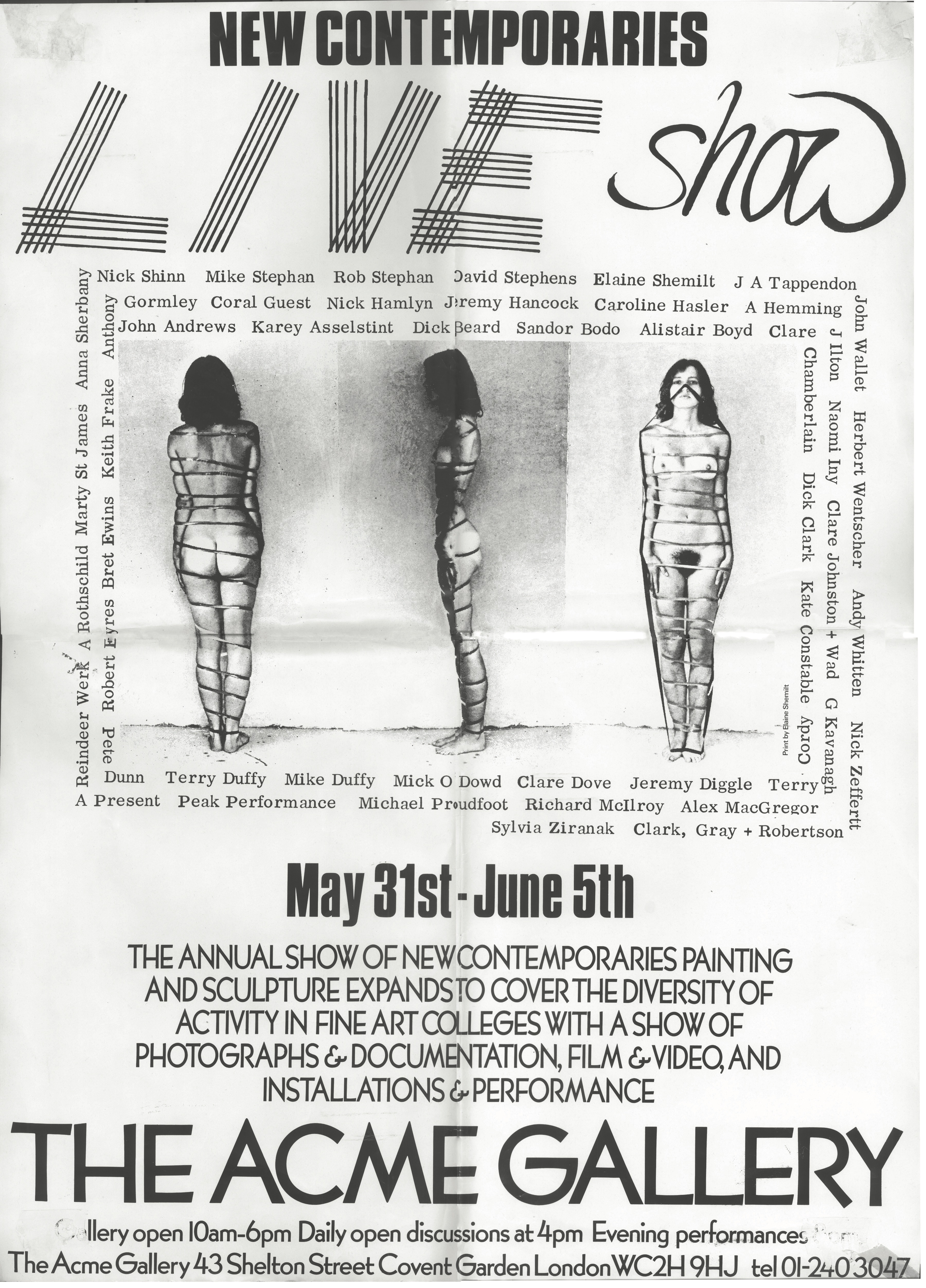
Poster for the exhibition

and included a programmes of Live Art,(May 31 until June 5), from Jeremy Diggle, Terry Duffy, Marty St James, Charlie Process, Elaine Shemilt, et al.

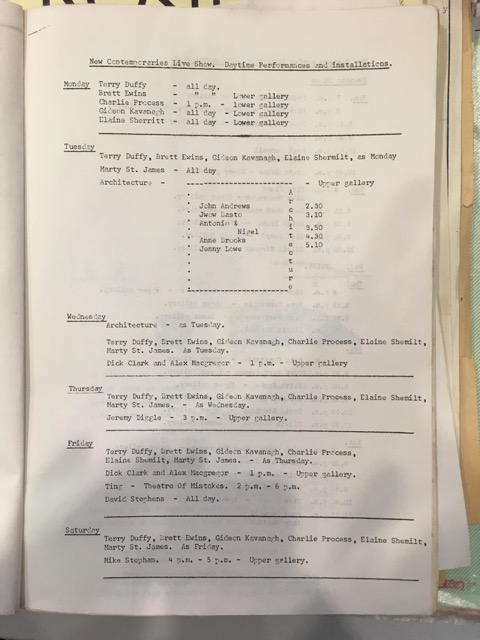
Scan of typewritten document showing a running order of live performances at Acme Gallery

From 1978, the exhibition had an established exhibition venue in the Institute of Contemporary Arts (ICA) and a Permanent Committee supported the exhibition management until 1983. The selection of contributors was made by panels of students, divided between the specialisms of painting, sculpture, and performance/film. However, the students soon began to realise that the current format for the exhibition was unsustainable, and many organisers were left with personal debt. In one interesting movement toward complete democratisation, the 1981 committee “in order to encourage a larger entry of works” asked for all submissions to be made in the form of slides and then created a slideshow that could be arranged at will “to give a more complete idea of what is going on in art colleges at the moment.” The final exhibition in this student-led format was staged in 1986 with a catalogue which contained a historical introduction (and post-script), to the exhibition by Andrew Lambirth, New Contemporaries Past and Present. This essay also includes a number of published letters from previous contributors such as RB Kitaj, Bert Irvin, Michael Sandle, Richard Wentworth, and Derek Jarman. Artists who participated in the exhibition during this period include Helen Chadwick, Anish Kapoor (both 1977), Antony Gormley (1978), Mark Wallinger (1981), Peter Doig (1982), Dexter Dalwood (1983), and Catherine Yass (1984).

=== 1988–present ===
In 1987, the Arts Council of Great Britain commissioned a feasibility report on New Contemporaries to look into the future viability of the exhibition. Published by Richard Shone, who has since become the Chair of a Volunteer Board of Directors, the report proposed a new structure and constitution for the organisation. For the first time, the exhibition was made independent from the art colleges, and supported by professional administration, inviting a panel of selectors each year to pick contributors. The exhibition was relaunched at the ICA in 1989 and toured to four regional centres. From 1989 to 1994, the exhibition was sponsored by British Telecom, from 2000 to 2025 the exhibition was sponsored by Bloomberg. In 2025 a protest was staged outside the ICA to coincide with the opening of the exhibition, with protestors calling for a divestment from Bloomberg due to its long term financial support of Israel; a Gaza Biennale was hosted outside the ICA as part of the protest, with artworks by artists in Gaza projected onto the external wall. In 2026 New Contemporaries dropped Bloomberg as its primary sponsor.

In 1996, the exhibition was invited to become a component of the Liverpool Biennial of Contemporary Art and has since been staged in the city every two years. New Contemporaries is also supported by the Arts Council England. During this recent period participants have included Damien Hirst, Glen Brown (both 1989), Simon Starling (1994), Natalie Finnemore (2012) and Hardeep Pandhal (2013).

In 2020, due to the COVID-19 pandemic, and the impact it had on the arts, New Contemporaries staged an online platform, selected by artists Alexandre da Cunha, Anthea Hamilton and Linder.

== See also ==
- List of European art awards
