= Jessica Craig-Martin =

American photographer (born 1963)

- Born: 1963 (age 62–63); United States
- Occupation: Photographer
- Father: Michael Craig-Martin
- Website: jessicacraigmartin.com

Jessica Craig-Martin (born 1963) is an American writer and photographer known for her images of high-society events, parties, charity galas, and exclusive social scenes. Her photographs often appear in contexts critiquing the "dark side" of the glamour world.

== Career ==
Craig-Martin has been a photographer of social events since the 1990s. In 1997, she was offered a contract by Anna Wintour.

She frequently contributes photography to major publications like The New Yorker, Vanity Fair, and Vogue. Her style subverts traditional society photography by favoring harsh realism, cropped compositions, oblique angles, and avoiding clear facial identification of subjects to highlight themes of desire, disappointment, glamour's underbelly, and the absurdities of wealth and status.

Her work has been exhibited widely and is held in collections including the Whitney Museum (New York), the New Museum (New York), and the Guggenheim Museum (New York).

She is the daughter of the artist Michael Craig-Martin.

== Exhibitions ==
=== Solo ===
- Jessica Craig-Martin, October 14, 2001 – January 20, 2002, MoMA P.S.1 Contemporary Art Center

=== Group ===
- Jessica Craig-Martin and Lucas Michael, 1997, Bosky & Gallery

== Publications ==
Her first monograph, Jessica Craig-Martin: Privilege, features photographs from the world's most financially lubricated events, with essays by Glenn O'Brien and Angus Cook. She has authored a memoir-in-stories titled I Regret I Am Able to Attend: A Life Among Artists (published by Spiegel & Grau/Penguin Random House), an account of her coming-of-age in the art world of the 1970s and 80s.
