= Just what is it that makes today's homes so different, so appealing? =

Collage by Richard Hamilton

- Artist: Richard Hamilton
- Year: 1956
- Type: Collage
- Dimensions: 26 cm × 24.8 cm (10.25 in × 9.75 in)
- Location: Kunsthalle Tübingen, Tübingen

Just what is it that makes today's homes so different, so appealing? is a 1956 collage by English artist Richard Hamilton. It measures 10.25 in (260 mm) × 9.75 in (248 mm). The work is now in the collection of the Kunsthalle Tübingen, Tübingen, Germany. It was the first work of pop art to achieve iconic status.

== History ==
Just what is it that makes today's homes so different, so appealing? was created in 1956 for the catalogue of the exhibition This Is Tomorrow in London, England, in which it was reproduced in black and white. In addition, the piece was used in posters for the exhibit. Hamilton and his friends John McHale and John Voelcker had collaborated to create the room that became the best-known part of the exhibition.

Hamilton subsequently created several works in which he reworked the subject and composition of the pop art collage, including a 1992 version featuring the female bodybuilder Bernie Price which he produced using a Quantel Paintbox.

== Sources ==
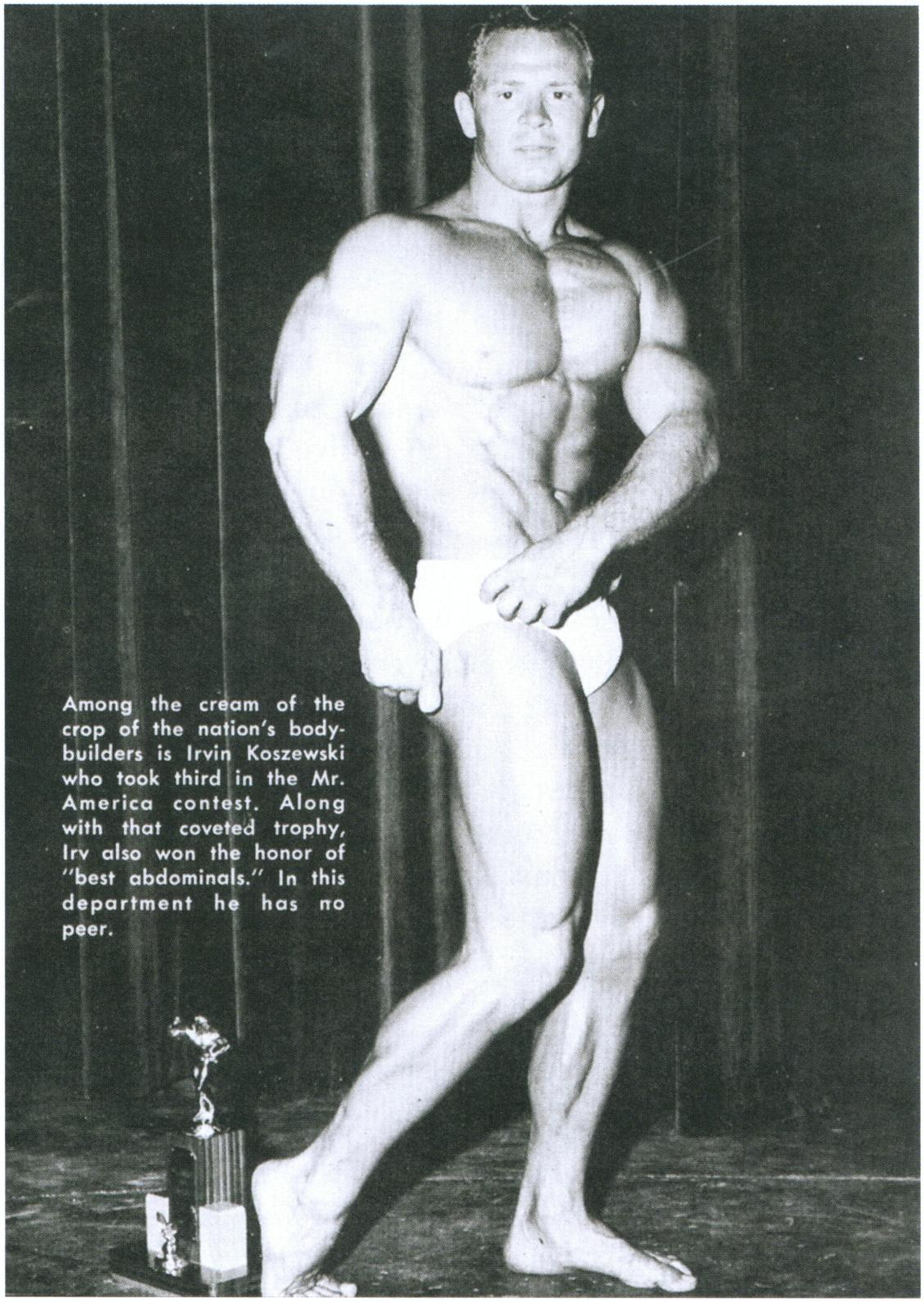
The photo of bodybuilder Irvin Koszewski as it originally appeared in Tomorrow's Man, 1954

According to a 2007 article by the art historian John-Paul Stonard, the collage consists of images taken mainly from American magazines. The principal template was an image of a modern sitting-room in an advertisement in Ladies' Home Journal for Armstrong Floors, which describes the "modern fashion in floors". The title is also taken from copy in the advert, which states "Just what is it that makes today's homes so different, so appealing? Open planning of course—and a bold use of color." The bodybuilder is Irvin "Zabo" Koszewski, winner of Mr L.A. in 1954. The photograph is taken from Tomorrow's Man magazine, September 1954. The artist Jo Baer, who posed for erotic magazines in her youth, has claimed that she is the burlesque woman on the sofa, but the magazine from which the picture is taken has not been identified. The staircase is taken from an advertisement for Hoover's new model "Constellation", and it was sourced from the same issue of Ladies' Home Journal, June 1955, as the Armstrong Floors ad. The picture of artist Jack Kirby's cover for Young Romance Volume 1 Issue 26 was from an advertisement for the magazine included in its associated publication Young Love (no 15, 1950). The TV is a Stromberg-Carlson, taken from a 1955 advert. Hamilton asserted that the rug was a blow-up from a photograph depicting a crowd on the Whitley Bay beach. The image of planet Earth at the top was cut from Life magazine (Sept 1955). The original reference image for the collage from Life magazine supplied to Hamilton is in the John McHale archives at Yale University. It was one of the first images to be laid down in the collage. The Victorian man in the portrait has not been identified. The periodical on the chair is a copy of The Journal of Commerce, founded by telegraph pioneer Samuel F. B. Morse. The tape recorder is a British-made Boosey & Hawkes "Reporter", but the source of the image has not been identified. The view through the window is a widely reproduced photograph of the exterior of a cinema in 1927 showing the premiere of the early "talkie" film, The Jazz Singer starring Al Jolson; the actual original source of the image has not yet been found.

== Authorship ==
In 2006, artist John McHale's son, John McHale Jr., said that his father claimed he was the creator of the image, having provided the original measured design and iconic material for the collage, including the magazines from which much of the collage was assembled. McHale said that the source material was his, sent to Hamilton from Yale University, where McHale was studying, and that Hamilton's role was simply "mechanical" cutting out and pasting according to McHale's design.

In response, Hamilton said this was "absurd. The collage has been widely reproduced over the last fifty years and my authorship was never, to my knowledge, contested by John McHale Sr. when he was alive." Hamilton said that McHale provided him with a rough layout for six pages for the This is Tomorrow exhibition catalogue, but he only used two of them, and the other pages, including this collage, were created by himself; the American magazines that provided the images were from the collection of Magda and Frank Cordell, and the images were cut out by Hamilton's wife, Terry O'Reilly, and Magda Cordell. Magda Cordell has said:

While Richard, of course, put together the well-known poster collage for the group [..] some of the material in that collage came from John McHale's files, and both Terry Hamilton and I helped gather the images. We often looked for material in the studio John and I shared. Sometimes when I look at that poster, I think it looks a bit like the sitting room in Cleveland Square where our studio was, but this may be only my imagination.

== References in popular culture ==
In 2007, the Serbian and former Yugoslav new wave band VIS Idoli released a career spanning box set featuring the image as a basis for the box set cover.

For the 2023 film Barbie, production designer Sarah Greenwood and set decorator Katie Spencer modeled Ken’s “Mojo Dojo Casa House” after the image.

In the prologue of the mobile game Reverse: 1999, titled This Is Tomorrow (a reference to the 1956 exhibition), the onset of the 1966 "Storm" causes buildings' edges to melt in "raindrops" rising from the ground, and "the collage of Richard Hamilton falls from the sky".
