= Richard Hamilton (artist) =

English painter and collage artist (1922–2011)

Richard Hamilton CH
- Hamilton in 1992
- Born: 24 February 1922; Pimlico, London, England
- Died: 13 September 2011 (aged 89); London, England
- Education: Royal Academy; Slade School of Art, University College London
- Known for: Collage; painting; graphics
- Notable work: Just what is it that makes today's homes so different, so appealing? (1956); The Beatles album cover (1968)
- Movement: Pop art
- Awards: Praemium Imperiale (2008)
- Website: Richard Hamilton – Art UK

Richard William Hamilton CH (24 February 1922 – 13 September 2011) was an English painter and collage artist. His 1955 exhibition Man, Machine and Motion (Hatton Gallery, Newcastle upon Tyne) and his 1956 collage Just what is it that makes today's homes so different, so appealing?, produced for the This Is Tomorrow exhibition of the Independent Group in London, are considered by critics and historians to be among the earliest works of pop art. A major retrospective of his work was at Tate Modern in 2014.

== Early life ==
Hamilton was born in Pimlico, London on 24 February 1922. Despite having left school with no formal qualifications, he managed to gain employment as an apprentice working at an electrical components firm, where he discovered an ability for draughtsmanship and began to do painting at evening classes at Saint Martin's School of Art and at the Westminster School of Art. In 1938, he enrolled in the Royal Academy of Arts.

After spending World War II working as a technical draftsman, he re-enrolled at the Royal Academy Schools but was expelled in 1946 on grounds of "not profiting from the instruction". Loss of his student status forced Hamilton to carry out National Service. After two years at the Slade School of Art, University College London, Hamilton began exhibiting his work at the Institute of Contemporary Arts (ICA), where he also produced posters and leaflets. He taught at the Central School of Art and Design from 1952 until 1966.

== 1950s–1960s ==
Hamilton's early work was much influenced by D'Arcy Wentworth Thompson's 1917 text On Growth and Form. In 1951, Hamilton staged an exhibition called Growth and Form at the Institute of Contemporary Arts in London. A pioneering form of installation art, it featured scientific models, diagrams and photographs presented as a unified artwork. In 1952, at the first Independent Group meeting, held at the ICA, Hamilton was introduced to Eduardo Paolozzi's seminal presentation of collages produced in the late 1940s and early 1950s that are now considered to be the first standard bearers of Pop Art. Also in 1952, he was introduced to the Green Box notes of Marcel Duchamp through Roland Penrose, whom Hamilton had met at the ICA. At the ICA, Hamilton was responsible for the design and installation of a number of exhibitions including one on James Joyce and The Wonder and the Horror of the Human Head that was curated by Penrose. It was also through Penrose that Hamilton met Victor Pasmore who gave him a teaching post in the Fine Art Department of Durham University at Newcastle upon Tyne, which lasted until 1966. Among the students Hamilton tutored at Newcastle in this period were Rita Donagh, Mark Lancaster, Tim Head, Roxy Music founder Bryan Ferry and Ferry's visual collaborator Nicholas de Ville. Hamilton's influence can be found in the visual styling and approach of Roxy Music. He described Ferry as "his greatest creation". Ferry repaid the compliment, naming him in 2010 as the living person he most admired, saying "he greatly influenced my ways of seeing art and the world".

Hamilton gave a 1959 lecture, "Glorious Technicolor, Breathtaking Cinemascope and Stereophonic Sound", a phrase taken from a Cole Porter lyric in the 1957 musical Silk Stockings. In that lecture, which sported a pop soundtrack and the demonstration of an early Polaroid camera, Hamilton deconstructed the technology of cinema to explain how it helped to create Hollywood’s allure. He further developed that theme in the early 1960s with a series of paintings inspired by film stills and publicity shots.

The post at the ICA also afforded Hamilton the time to further his research on Duchamp, which resulted in the 1960 publication of a typographic version of Duchamp's Green Box, which comprised Duchamp's original notes for the design and construction of his famous work The Bride Stripped Bare by Her Bachelors, Even, also known as The Large Glass. Hamilton's 1955 exhibition of paintings at the Hanover Gallery were all in some form a homage to Duchamp. In the same year Hamilton organized the exhibition Man Machine Motion at the Hatton Gallery in the Fine Art Department at King's College, Durham (now Newcastle University). Designed to look more like an advertising display than a conventional art exhibition the show prefigured Hamilton's contribution to the This Is Tomorrow exhibition in London, at the Whitechapel Gallery the following year. Just what is it that makes today's homes so different, so appealing? was created in 1956 for the catalogue of This Is Tomorrow, where it was reproduced in black and white and also used in posters for the exhibit. The collage depicts a muscle-man provocatively holding a Tootsie Pop and a woman with large, bare breasts wearing a lampshade hat, surrounded by emblems of 1950s affluence from a vacuum cleaner to a large canned ham. Just what is it that makes today's homes so different, so appealing? is widely acknowledged as one of the first pieces of pop art. Hamilton's written definition of what "pop" is laid the ground for the whole international movement. Hamilton's definition of Pop Art from a letter to Alison and Peter Smithson dated 16 January 1957 was: "Pop Art is: popular, transient, expendable, low-cost, mass-produced, young, witty, sexy, gimmicky, glamorous, and Big Business", stressing its everyday, commonplace values. He thus created collages incorporating advertisements from mass-circulation newspapers and magazines.

The success of This Is Tomorrow secured Hamilton further teaching assignments in particular at the Royal College of Art from 1957 to 1961, where he promoted David Hockney and Peter Blake. During this period Hamilton was also very active in the Campaign for Nuclear Disarmament and produced a work parodying the then leader of the Labour Party Hugh Gaitskell for rejecting a policy of unilateral nuclear disarmament. In the early 1960s he received a grant from the Arts Council to investigate the condition of the Kurt Schwitters Merzbau in Cumbria. The research eventually resulted in Hamilton organising the preservation of the work by relocating it to the Hatton Gallery in Newcastle University Fine Art Department.

In his works, Hamilton frequently incorporated the materials of consumer society. Just what is it that makes today’s homes so different, so appealing? (1956) used American magazines, brought back from the United States by John McHale and Magda Cordell. Hamilton also incorporated pieces of plastic directly into his collages. In Pin-up (1961), a mixed-media work exploring the female nude, sculpted plastic was used for the breasts of the nude figure. $he (1959–1961) incorporated a plastic holographic eye, given to Hamilton by Herbert Ohl. The use of plastics has created significant challenges in conserving Hamilton's works. As early as 1964, when Pin-up and $he were loaned for a solo show of Hamilton's works at the Hanover Gallery in London, they were found to be cracked, with plastic lifting off the supporting surfaces. Hamilton experimented with materials, including plywood, acrylic glass, and plasticizers, and worked closely with conservators to repair his works and develop better techniques for incorporating and conserving plastics in artworks.

In 1962 his first wife Terry was killed in a car accident. In part to recover from her loss, in 1963 Hamilton travelled for the first time to the United States for a retrospective of the works of Marcel Duchamp at the Pasadena Art Museum, where, as well as meeting other leading pop artists, he was befriended by Duchamp. Arising from this Hamilton curated the first British retrospective of Duchamp's work, and his familiarity with The Green Box enabled Hamilton to make copies of The Large Glass and other glass works too fragile to travel. The exhibition was shown at the Tate Gallery in 1966.

In 1968, Hamilton appeared in a Brian De Palma film titled Greetings where Hamilton portrays a pop artist showing a "Blow Up" image. The film was Robert De Niro's first motion picture, and the first film in the United States to appeal an X rating.

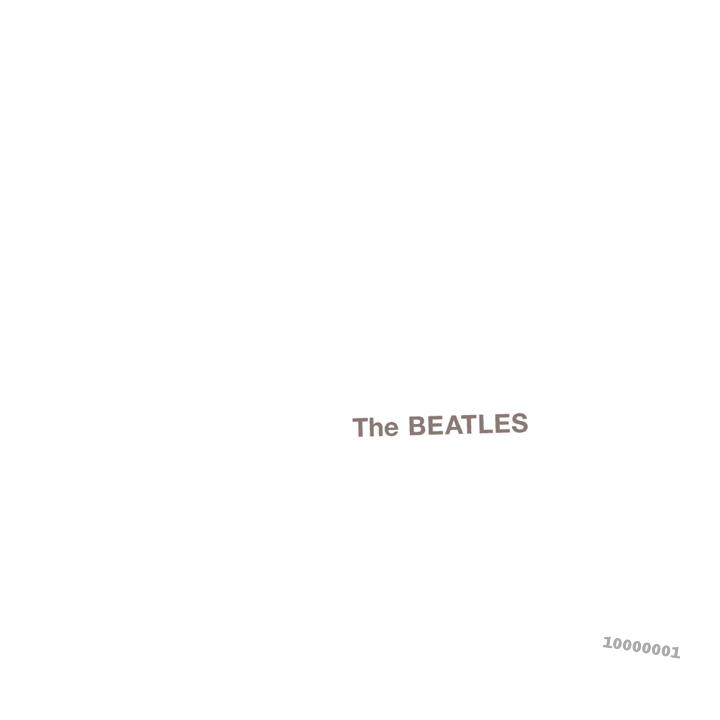
Hamilton's cover art for The Beatles (1968)

From the mid-1960s, Hamilton was represented by Robert Fraser and even produced a series of prints, Swingeing London, based on Fraser's arrest, along with Mick Jagger, for possession of drugs. This association with the 1960s pop music scene continued as Hamilton became friends with Paul McCartney resulting in him producing the cover design and poster collage for the Beatles' White Album.

In 1969, Hamilton appeared in a documentary by filmmaker James Scott, in which he discussed the Swingeing London series and his preoccupation with mass media through a selection of his own work.

== 1970s–2011 ==
During the 1970s, Richard Hamilton enjoyed international acclaim with a number of major exhibitions being organised of his work. Hamilton had found a new companion in painter Rita Donagh. Together they set about converting North End, a farm in the Oxfordshire countryside, into a home and studios. "By 1970, always fascinated by new technology, Hamilton was redirecting advances in product design into fine art, with the backing of xartcollection, Zurich, a young company that pioneered the production of multiples with the aim of bringing art to a wider audience." Hamilton realised a series of projects that blurred the boundaries between artwork and product design including a painting that incorporated a state-of-the-art radio receiver and the casing of a Dataindustrier AB computer. During the 1980s Hamilton again voyaged into industrial design and designed two computer exteriors: OHIO computer prototype (for a Swedish firm named Isotron, 1984) and DIAB DS-101 (for Dataindustrier AB, 1986). As part of a television project, 1987 BBC series Painting with Light Hamilton was introduced to the Quantel Paintbox and subsequently purchased one for his studio to produce and modify his work.

From the late 1970s Hamilton’s activity was concentrated largely on investigations of printmaking processes, often in unusual and complex combinations. In 1977–78 Hamilton undertook a series of collaborations with the artist Dieter Roth that also blurred the definitions of the artist as sole author of their work.

In 1992, Richard Hamilton was commissioned by the BBC to recreate his famous art piece, Just What Is It That Makes Today's Homes So Different, So Appealing? but only this time, as to what he felt the average household would be like during the 1990s. Instead of the male body builder, he used an accountant working at a desk. Instead of the female icon, he used a world class female body builder.

In 1981 Hamilton began work on a trilogy of paintings based on the conflict in Northern Ireland after watching a television documentary about the "Blanket" protest organized by IRA prisoners in Long Kesh Prison, officially known as The Maze. The citizen (1981–1983) shows IRA prisoner Hugh Rooney portrayed as Jesus, with long flowing hair and a beard. Republican prisoners had refused to wear prison uniforms, claiming that they were political prisoners. Prison officers refused to let "the blanket protesters" use the toilets unless they wore prison uniforms. The republican prisoners refused, and instead smeared the excrement on the wall of their cells. Hamilton explained (in the catalogue to his Tate Gallery exhibition, 1992), that he saw the image of "the blanket man as a public relations contrivance of enormous efficacy. It had the moral conviction of a religious icon and the persuasiveness of the advertising man's dream soap commercial - yet it was a present reality". The subject (1988–89) shows an Orangeman, a member of an order dedicated to preserve Unionism in Northern Ireland. The state (1993) shows a British soldier on a "foot" patrol on a street. The citizen was shown as part of "A Cellular Maze", a 1983 joint exhibition with Donagh at the Orchard Gallery in Derry. The pair created a yellow pamphlet appropriating the style of 17th Century political pamphlets distributed by the Diggers and Ditchers to link the cause of Republican strikers to previous historic struggles.

From the late 1940s Richard Hamilton was engaged with a project to produce a suite of illustrations for James Joyce's Ulysses. In 1988, the Orchard Gallery, Derry did an exhibition and publication entitled, "Work in Progress" of the copper plate etchings Hamilton had been making since the 1940s. Before this an unsuccessful attempt had been made alongside Joseph Beuys to display the etchings, alongside the additional two chapters of Ulysses that Beuys had authored. The proposed show was to take place on 7.7.77 - a magic date in Joyce's thinking at the lighthouse in Sandycove but was terminated due to the property owners worries about the fragility of Joyce's original manuscripts. In 2002, the British Museum staged an exhibition of Hamilton's illustrations of James Joyce's Ulysses, entitled Imaging Ulysses. A book of Hamilton's illustrations was published simultaneously, with text by Stephen Coppel. In the book, Hamilton explained that the idea of illustrating this complex, experimental novel occurred to him when he was doing his National Service in 1947. His first preliminary sketches were made while at the Slade School of Art, and he continued to refine and re-work the images over the next 50 years. Hamilton felt his re-working of the illustrations in many different media had produced a visual effect analogous to Joyce's verbal techniques. The Ulysses illustrations were subsequently exhibited at the Irish Museum of Modern Art (in Dublin) and the Museum Boijmans Van Beuningen (in Rotterdam). The British Museum exhibition coincided with both the 80th anniversary of the publication of Joyce's novel, and Richard Hamilton's 80th birthday.

Hamilton died on 13 September 2011, at the age of 89. His work Le chef d’oeuvre inconnu – a painting in three parts, unfinished at his death, comprises a trio of large inkjet prints composed from Photoshop images to visualize the moment of crisis in Balzac’s novel The Unknown Masterpiece.

== Exhibitions ==
The first exhibition of Hamilton's paintings was shown at the Hanover Gallery, London, in 1955. In 1993 Hamilton represented Great Britain at the Venice Biennale and was awarded the Golden Lion. Major retrospective exhibitions have been organized by the Tate Gallery, London, 1970 and 1992, Solomon R. Guggenheim Museum, New York, 1973, MACBA, Barcelona, Museum Ludwig, Cologne, 2003, and the Neue Nationalgalerie, Berlin, 1974. Some of the group exhibitions Hamilton participated in include: Documenta 4, Kassel, 1968; São Paulo Art Biennial, 1989; Documenta X, Kassel 1997; Gwangju Biennale, 2004; and Shanghai Biennale, 2006. In 2010, the Serpentine Gallery presented Hamilton’s ‘Modern Moral Matters’, an exhibition focusing on his political and protest works which were shown previously in 2008 at Inverleith House, Royal Botanic Garden in Edinburgh. For the season 2001/2002 in the Vienna State Opera Richard Hamilton designed the large scale picture (176 sqm) "Retard en Fer – Delay in Iron" as part of the exhibition series "Safety Curtain", conceived by museum in progress. Just the week prior to his death the artist was working with the Museo Nacional Centro de Arte Reina Sofía, Madrid, to prepare a major museum retrospective of his oeuvre that had already been scheduled to open first at Tate Modern, London, on 13 February 2014, travelling later to Madrid where it will open on 24 June 2014.

In 2009, the Metropolitan Museum of Art exhibited Richard Hamilton: Selected Prints from the Collection: 1970–2005, an exhibit of 26 of Hamilton’s prints.

In 2011 Dublin City Gallery The Hugh Lane showed a joint retrospective exhibition of both Hamilton's and Rita Donagh's work called "Civil Rights etc." That same year, the Minneapolis Institute of Arts showcased Hamilton's work in Richard Hamilton: Pop Art Pioneer, 1922-2011. The National Gallery’s "Richard Hamilton: The Late Works" opened in 2012. A major retrospective at Tate Modern in 2014 was "the first retrospective to encompass the full scope of Hamilton’s work, from his early exhibition designs of the 1950s to his final paintings of 2011. [The] exhibition explores his relationship to design, painting, photography and television, as well as his engagement and collaborations with other artists".

== Collections ==
The Tate Gallery has a comprehensive collection of Hamilton's work from across his career. In 1996, the Kunstmuseum Winterthur received a substantial gift of Hamilton's prints, making the museum the largest repository of the artist's prints in the world.

== Recognition ==
Hamilton was awarded the William and Noma Copley Foundation Award, 1960; the John Moores Painting Prize, 1969; the Talens Prize International, 1970; the Leone d’Oro for his exhibition in the British Pavilion at the Venice Biennale, 1993; the Arnold Bode Prize at Documenta X, Kassel, 1997; and the Max Beckmann Prize for Painting of the City of Frankfurt, 2006. He was made a Member of the Order of the Companions of Honour (CH) in 2000. He was presented with a special award by The Bogside Artists of Derry at the Royal College of Art in 2010. The School of Arts building at Oxford Brookes University is named in his honour.

== Art market ==
Hamilton has been represented by The Robert Fraser Gallery. The Alan Cristea Gallery in London is the distributor of Hamilton's prints. His auction record is £440,000, set at Sotheby's, London, in February 2006, for Fashion Plate, Cosmetic Study X (1969) For a 2014 retrospective at the Museo Nacional Centro de Arte Reina Sofía, the government-owned museum insured 246 works of Hamilton for 115.6 million euros ($157 million) against loss or damage, according to an order published as law by the Ministry of Education, Culture and Sports.

== Bibliography ==
- Lucy R. Lippard, Pop Art, London, Thames and Hudson, 1985
- Richard Hamilton, Collected Words 1953-1982, New York, Thames and Hudson, 1983
- David Robbins (ed.), The Independent Group: Postwar Britain and the Aesthetics of Plenty, MIT Press, 1990
- Richard Hamilton (exhibition catalogue), London, Tate Gallery, 1992
- Etienne Lullin, Richard Hamilton, Stephen Coppel (eds.), Richard Hamilton: Prints and Multiples 1939-2002, Richter, 2004
- John Richardson, Richard Cork, Richard Hamilton, Hamilton, Dickinson, 2006
- Hal Foster and Alex Bacon (eds.), Richard Hamilton, London, The MIT Press, 2010
- Fanny Singer, Immaculate Conception: Richard Hamilton's digital prints, Cambridge University Ph.D dissertation, 2013
