= Mark Lancaster (artist) =

English artist and set designer (1938–2021)

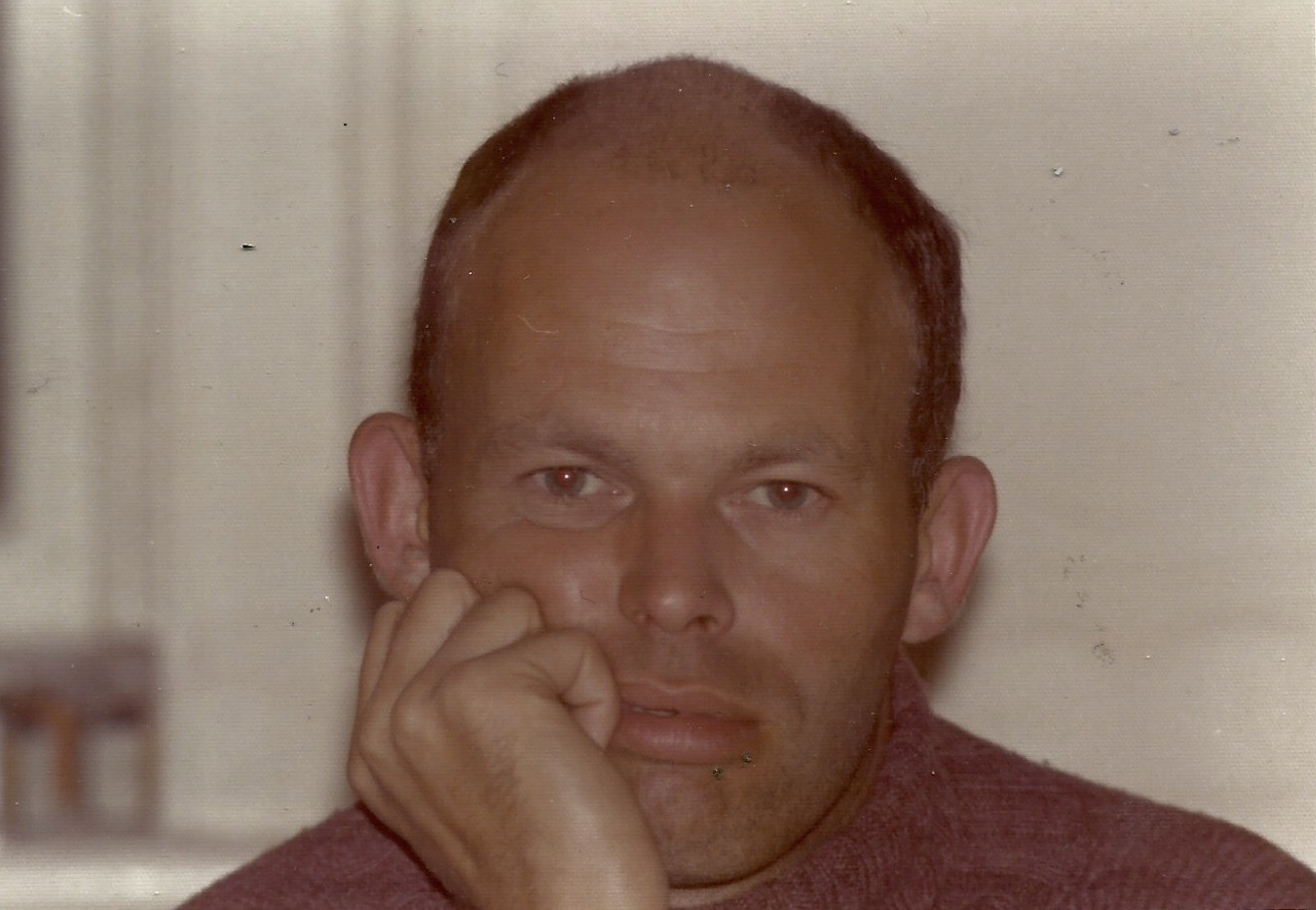
- Mark Lancaster around 1973
- Born: Christopher Ronald Mark Lancaster; 14 May 1938; Holmfirth, West Yorkshire, England
- Died: 30 April 2021 (aged 82); Miami Beach, Florida, United States
- Education: University of Newcastle upon Tyne
- Spouse: David Bolger

Christopher Ronald Mark Lancaster (14 May 1938 – 30 April 2021) was a British-American artist and set designer who worked extensively with the Cunningham Dance Company. Alastair Macaulay referred to him as a "superlative designer" who "knew how to create drama by colour contrasts."

== Early life ==
Lancaster was born in Holmfirth, West Yorkshire on 14 May 1938. In early childhood, he chose to go by Mark. He attended Holme Valley Grammar School (1949-1952) and Bootham School in York (1952-1955) before returning home to work in the family textile business. He studied textile technology for six years, painting in his own time, before attending King's College (1961-1965) to study Fine Art. Here, he studied under Richard Hamilton. Lancaster taught at the university, now called University of Newcastle upon Tyne, between 1965 and 1966, then at the Bath School of Art until 1968.

== Career ==
Lancaster visited New York City for the first time in 1964, where he worked briefly as an assistant to Andy Warhol and appeared in several of Warhol's movies. During this time, he met future collaborators Jasper Johns, Ray Johnson, Ellsworth Kelly, Roy Lichtenstein, Frank Stella, James Rosenquist, Larry Rivers, Frank O'Hara, Robert Motherwell, Helen Frankenthaler and Norman Mailer, among others. He photographed extensively and started a series of paintings related to the imagery of the popular Howard Johnson's restaurants. Upon returning to England, he shared his experiences with colleagues at Newcastle such as Bryan Ferry, Stephen Buckley, Nicholas deVille, Tim Head and Keith Milow.

His first one-person exhibition was at London's Rowan Gallery in November 1965, followed by shows at the Betty Parsons Gallery in New York City in 1972 and 1974. In 1974, his work Paintings Cambridge/New York was curated by Richard Francis at the Walker Art Gallery. He was invited to be the first Artist in Residence at King's College, Cambridge from 1968 to 1970, where he befriended E. M. Forster, Dadie Rylands and Duncan Grant. Lancaster's paintings at this time focused on the ambience of Cambridge and the architecture of King's College, and have elements of American modernism and pop imagery. His work was shown at international exhibitions organized by the British Council, including the Paris Biennale and the National Gallery of Art in 1970. He made a series of prints with Kalpra Studios, Editions Alecto, and Simca Studios at this time.

Lancaster moved permanently to the United States in 1973, where he became Jasper Johns' assistant and private secretary from 1974 to 1985. In 1975, he also began working as resident designer with the Merce Cunningham Dance Company. Over the next ten years, he designed sets, costumes, and lighting for a number of dance works, including Sounddance (1975), Squaregame (1976), Roadrunners (1979), Gallopade (1981), Fielding Sixes (1983) and Doubles (1984). He also designed Duets (1982) for the American Ballet Theatre and Fielding Sixes for Ballet Rambert and the Royal Ballet of Wallonia. He retired from the Cunningham Dance Company in 1984 but returned in 1988 to design Dive Stone Wind in Berlin, Avignon and New York, for which he received a 1989 Bessie Award. He designed for a number of the company's dances for the company until 1994.

In 1985, Lancaster returned briefly to England, where he lived in Sandgate, Kent. In the year following Andy Warhol's 1987 death, he created nearly 200 small paintings, collectively entitled Post-Warhol Souvenirs, which all featured references to Warhol's Marilyn Diptych. The collection was premiered at London's Mayor Rowan Gallery in 1988 on the one-year anniversary of Warhol's death. Marco Livingstone referenced Post-Warhol Souvenirs in an Art & Design article and in his book Pop Art, A Continuing History. Upon his return to the United States, Lancaster lived in Miami, Florida and Jamestown, Rhode Island. He became an American citizen in 1999.

== Personal life and legacy ==
For the last 20 years of his life, Lancaster lived in Miami Beach, Florida with his husband, artist David Bolger. He died on 30 April 2021, at the age of 82. A portrait of Lancaster by Edward Lucie-Smith resides at the National Portrait Gallery, London. Michael Bracewell detailed Lancaster's Newcastle days and first New York visit in his book Re-make/Re-Model (2007).
