= Irvin Koszewski =

American bodybuilder

- Professional bodybuilder
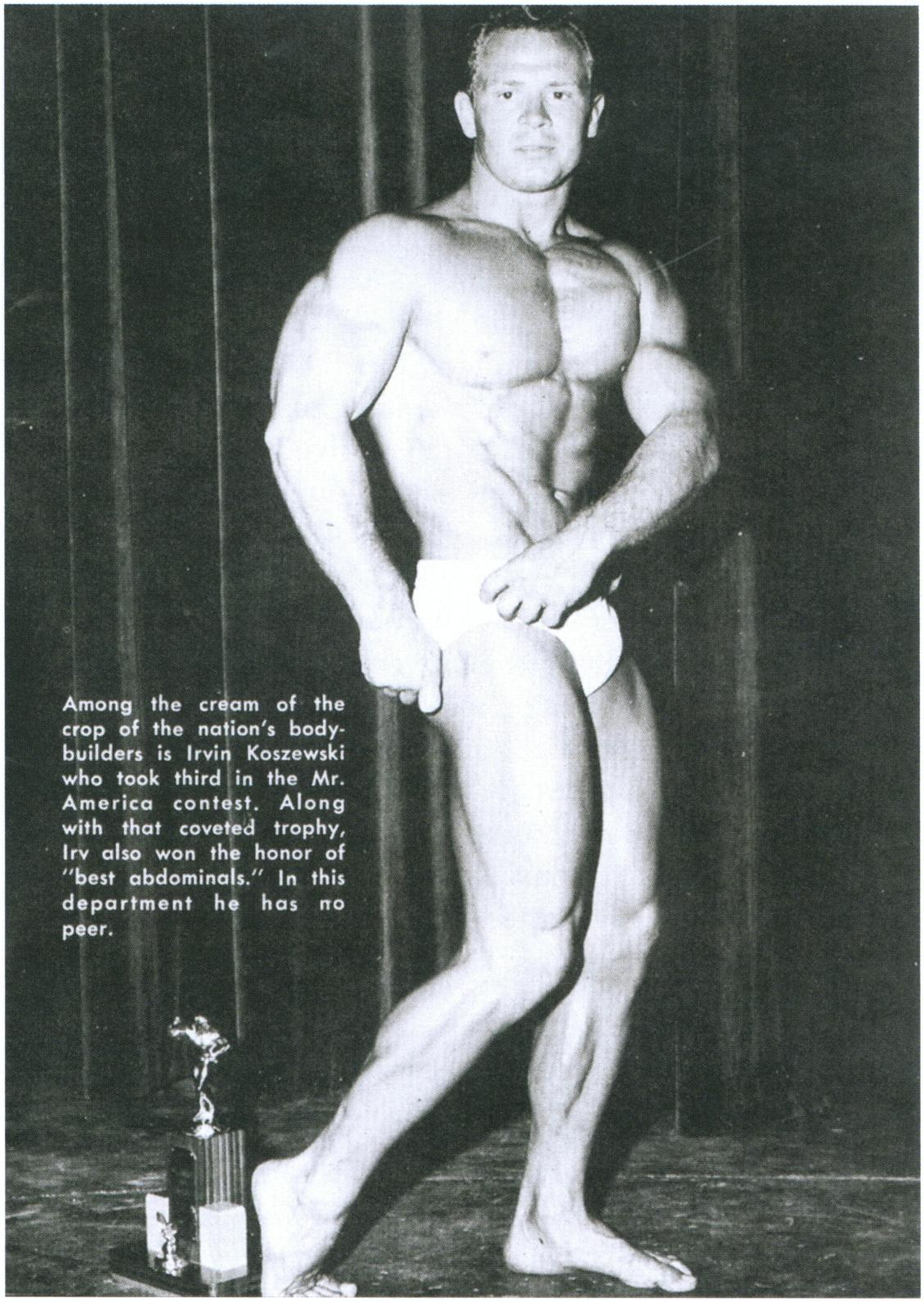
- Koszewski pictured in Tomorrow's Man, 1954

Personal info
- Nickname: "Mr. Abs"
- Born: August 20, 1924; Camden, New Jersey, U.S.
- Died: March 29, 2009 (aged 84); Doylestown, Pennsylvania, U.S.

Best statistics
- Height: 5 ft 10 in (1.78 m)
- Weight: 186 lb (84 kg)

Professional (Pro) career
- Pro-debut: Mr. New Jersey; 1948

Irvin "Zabo" Koszewski (August 20, 1924 – March 29, 2009) was an American professional bodybuilder and a 2007 inductee to the International Federation of BodyBuilders Hall of Fame.

== Biography ==
Koszewski was particularly known for his abdominal muscles. John Balik of Iron Man magazine recalled that "he had a 10-pack of abs when everyone else had a six-pack."

Koszewski appeared in the Cheech and Chong film Nice Dreams (1981) and was the stunt double for Tommy Chong in Things Are Tough All Over (1982). He also appeared in the 2005 documentary film a/k/a Tommy Chong. A photograph of Koszewski is included in the iconic pop art collage Just what is it that makes today's homes so different, so appealing?

Koszewski died of pneumonia in Doylestown, Pennsylvania at the age of 84.

== Titles ==
- 1953 Mr. Los Angeles
- 1953 Mr. California
- 1954 Mr. California

== Filmography (actor) ==
Year	Title	Role	Notes
1954	Athena	Contestant #5	Uncredited
1960	Spartacus	Soldier	Uncredited
1965	John Goldfarb, Please Come Home!	Football Player	Uncredited
1968	Planet of the Apes	Gorilla	Uncredited
1981	Nice Dreams	Body Builder #1	(final film role)

== See also ==
- List of male professional bodybuilders
- List of female professional bodybuilders
