= Tom Holmes (artist) =

American painter

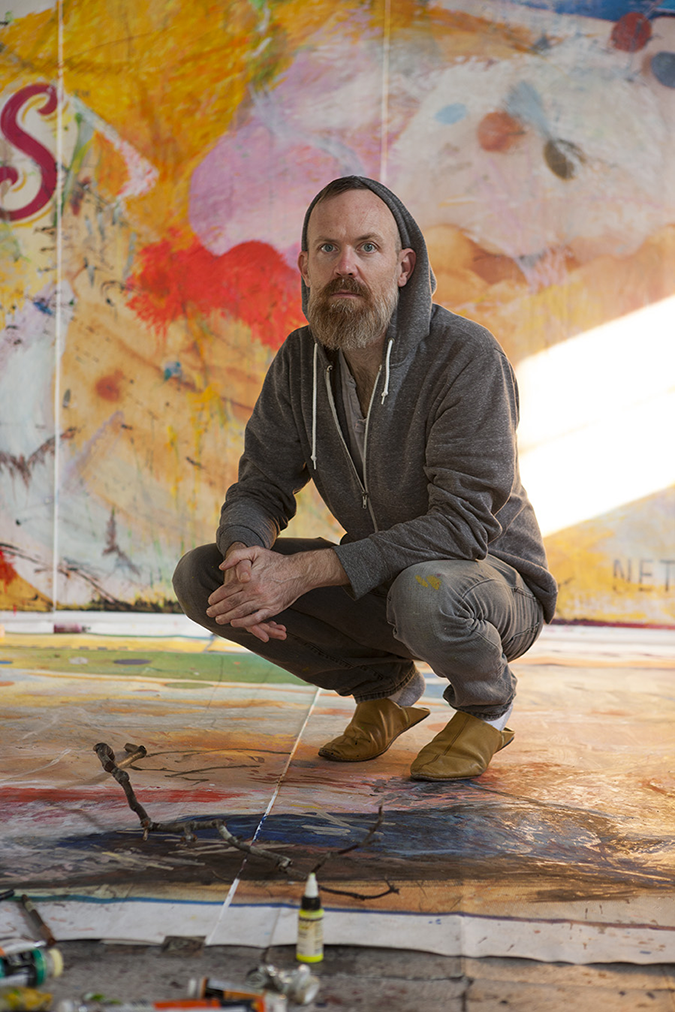
- Studio portrait of the artist Tom Holmes by Martirene Alcantara in 2015
- Born: Ozona, Texas, USA
- Occupation: Artist

Tom Holmes is an American artist.

== Exhibitions ==
Holmes mounted their first solo museum show Temporary Monument in 2013 at the Kunsthalle Bern. Their work has been included in exhibitions at Palais de Tokyo, Paris; Contemporary Art Biennial, Sélestat, France; Malmö Konstmuseum, Sweden and the Whitney Museum, New York. Work resides in the public collections of Albright-Knox, FRAC Bourgogne, Stiftung Kunsthalle Bern, and The Frances Young Tang Museum and Art Gallery at Skidmore College.

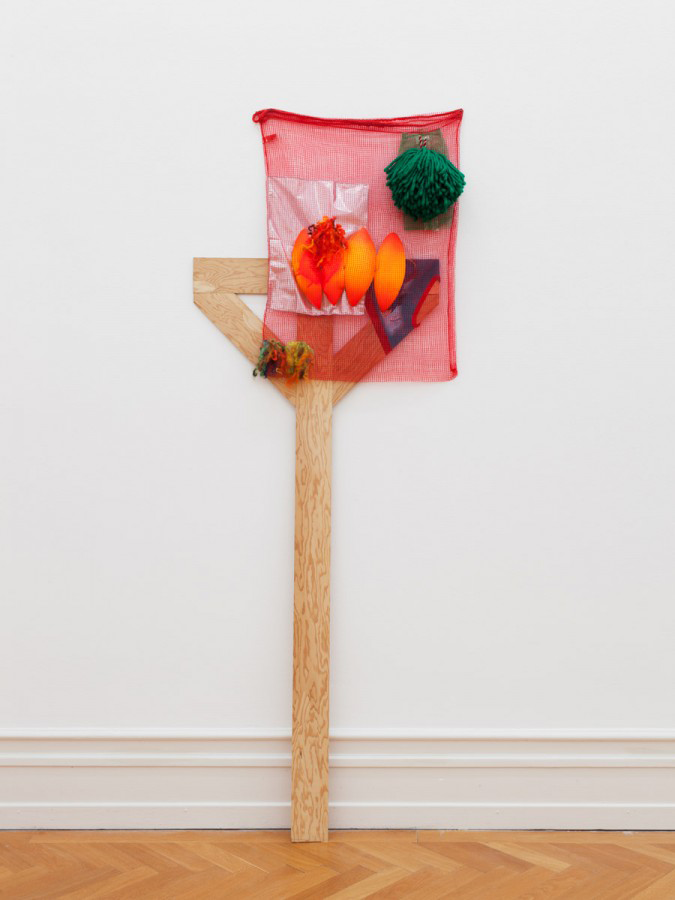
Tom Holmes, untitled Shroud (Orange Flavor), 2012, Stiftung Kunsthalle Bern

Holmes has described their artwork as working with "the problems of abstraction".

== Honors ==
- 100 W Corsicana
- Joan Mitchell Center
- HomeSession
- The Helene Wurlitzer Foundation

== Publications ==
- Improvisation Rules: Another 5 Years of Art Projects Homesession Barcelona, 2018. Print. (ISBN 9788409058709)
- Whitney Museum of American Art at Altria: 25 Years. New York: Whitney Museum of American Art, 2008. Print. (ISBN 9780300139334)
- Rist, Pipilotti, Richard Julin, and Tessa Praun. Pipilotti Rist: Congratulations!Baden: Lars Müller, 2007. Print. (ISBN 978-3-03778-108-1)
- Dorfsman, Alex, and Yoshua Okon. La Panadería, 1994-2002. México, D.F.: Editorial Turner De México, 2005. Print. (ISBN 9788475066493)
