= Michael Craig-Martin =

Irish contemporary conceptual artist and painter

Sir Michael Craig-Martin
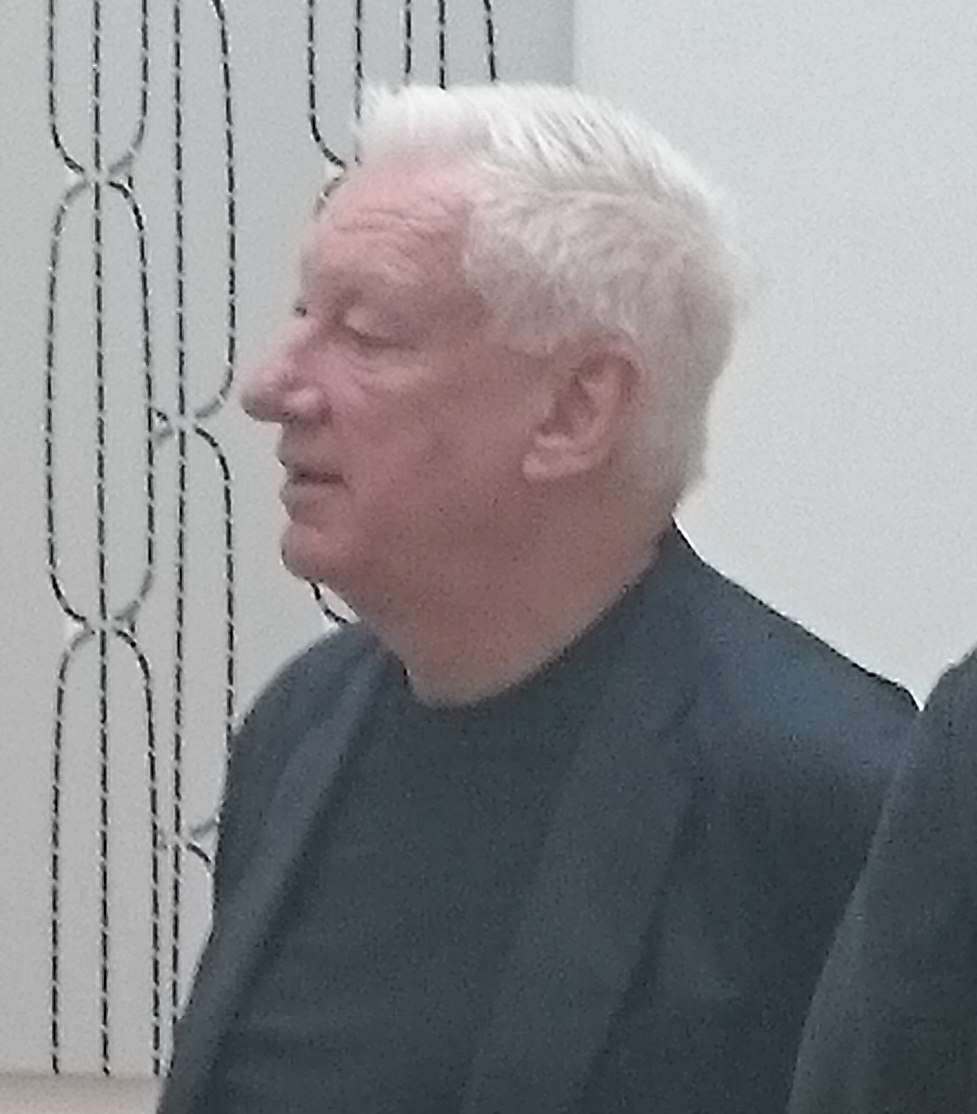
- Michael Craig-Martin in 2015
- Born: 28 August 1941 (age 85); Dublin, Ireland
- Education: Yale University
- Known for: Painting; drawing; conceptual artist
- Notable work: An Oak Tree
- Movement: Conceptualism
- Children: Jessica Craig-Martin
- Website: michaelcraigmartin.co.uk

Sir Michael Craig-Martin CBE RA (born 28 August 1941) is an Irish-born contemporary conceptual artist and painter. He is known for fostering and adopting the Young British Artists, many of whom he taught, and for his conceptual artwork, An Oak Tree. He is an emeritus Professor of Fine Art at Goldsmiths. His memoir and advice for the aspiring artist, On Being An Artist, was published by London-based publisher Art / Books in April 2015.

== Early life and career ==
Michael Craig-Martin was born in Dublin, but spent most of his childhood in Washington, D.C. For eight years, he attended a Roman Catholic primary school, which was operated by religious sisters, followed by the English Benedictine Priory School (now St. Anselm's Abbey School), where pupils were encouraged to look at religious imagery in illuminated glass panels and stained-glass windows. He gained an interest in art through one of the priests, who was an artist, and was also strongly impressed by a display in the Phillips Collection of work by Mark Rothko.

Craig-Martin studied in Lycée Français in Bogotá, Colombia, where his father had employment for a while. Drawing classes in the Lycée by an artist, Antonio Roda, gave him a wider perspective on art. His parents had no inclinations towards art, although they did have on display in their home Picasso's Greedy Child. Back in Washington, he attended drawing classes given there by artists, then in 1959 attended Fordham University in New York for English Literature and History, while also starting to paint.

In mid-1961 Craig-Martin studied art at the Académie de la Grande Chaumière in Paris, and in the autumn he began a painting course at Yale University, where the teaching was strongly influenced by the multi-disciplinary experimentation and minimalist theories on colour and form of Josef Albers, a former head of department. Craig-Martin later said, "Everything I know about colour comes from that course". Tutors on the course included artists Alex Katz and Al Held.

== Work ==
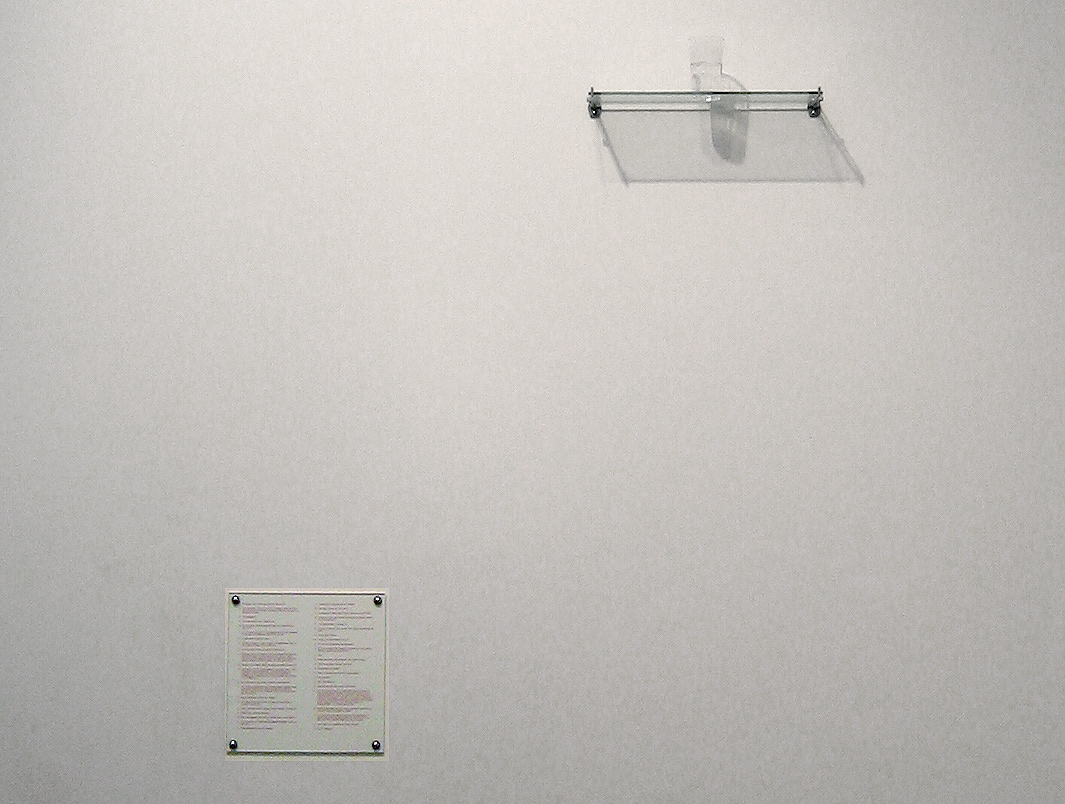
An Oak Tree (1973)

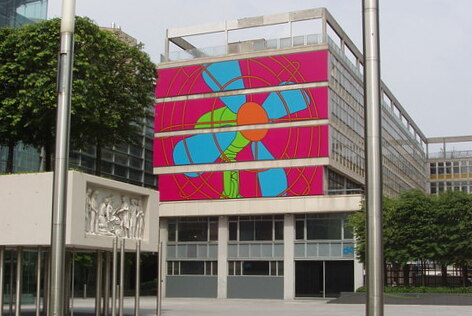
Mural by Craig-Martin, Triton Square, London

Craig-Martin has lived and worked in London since 1966. From his early box-like constructions of the late 1960s, he moved increasingly to the use of ordinary household objects. In the late 1970s he began to make line drawings of ordinary objects, creating over the years an ever-expanding vocabulary of images which form the foundation of his work to this day. During the 1990s the focus of his work shifted decisively to painting, with the same range of boldly outlined motifs and vivid color schemes applied both to works on canvas, and to increasingly complex installations of wall paintings.

=== An Oak Tree ===
In 1973, he exhibited the seminal piece An Oak Tree. The work consists of a glass of water standing on a shelf attached to the gallery wall, next to which is a text using an argument to explain why it is in fact an oak tree. Nevertheless, on one occasion when it was barred by Australian Customs officials from entering the country as vegetation, he was forced to explain it was really a glass of water. The work was bought by the National Gallery of Australia in 1977, and the Tate gallery has an artist's copy.

=== Young British Artists ===
From 1973, Craig-Martin was a tutor at Goldsmiths College and, during the 1980s, was a significant influence on the emerging YBA generation, including Damien Hirst. He was also helpful in promoting the Freeze show to established art-world figures. In 1995, he curated Drawing the Line: a comprehensive touring exhibition on the history of line drawing at the Southbank Centre, London. Craig-Martin and his influence were described in an article in the Observer regarding the mentors of British art, entitled Schools of Thought. Craig-Martin has been a trustee of the Tate Gallery and is a trustee of the National Art Collections Fund.

=== Later work ===
Since 2011, Craig-Martin has been working on powder-coated steel forms that describe everyday objects and appear like line drawings in the air. The first series was shown in the gardens of Chatsworth House in Derbyshire, in 2014, where the sculptures were sunk into the soil of the grounds.

== Exhibitions ==
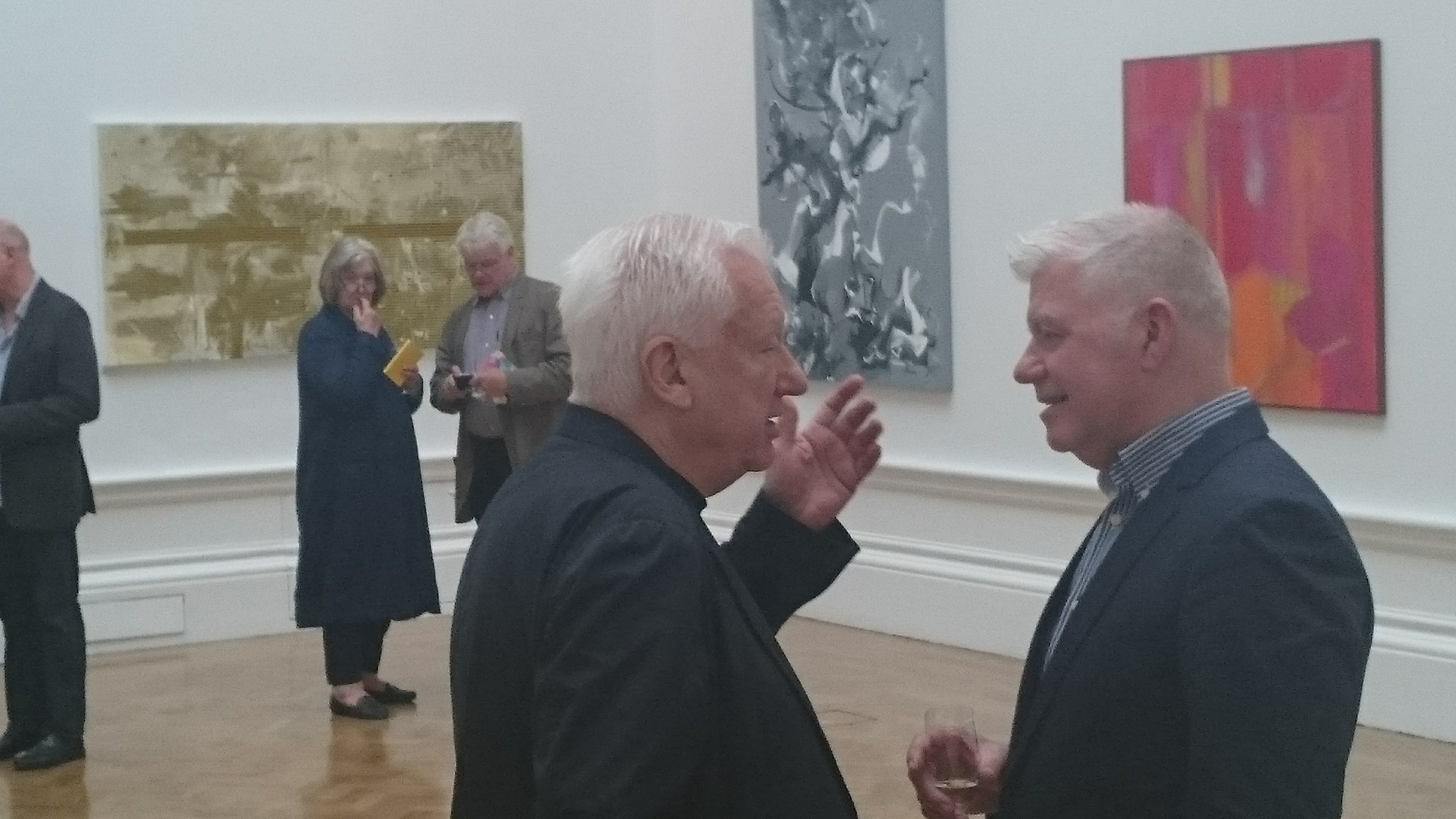
Michael Craig-Martin (left), and Keith Milow at "varnishing day", R.A. Summer Exhibition 2015

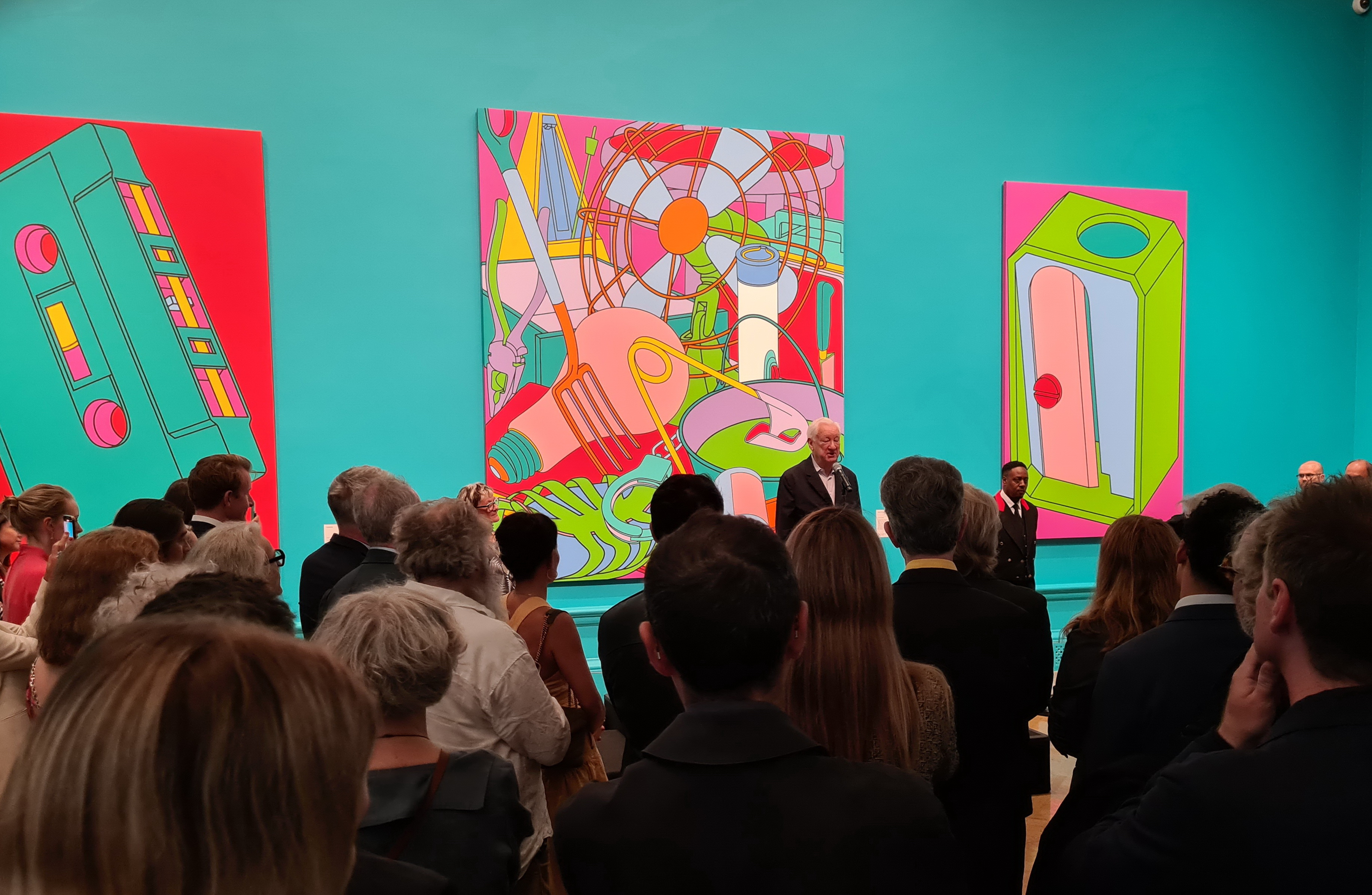
Michael Craig-Martin gives a speech at the opening of the 2024 retrospective at the Royal Academy

Craig-Martin had his first one-man exhibition at the Rowan Gallery in London in 1969. Since then, he has shown regularly both in the UK and abroad. He represented Britain at the São Paulo Art Biennial in 1998. His solo museum exhibitions include "Always Now", Kunstverein Hannover (1998); IVAM, Valencia (2000); "Living", Sintra Museum of Modern Art, Portugal (2001); "Signs of Life", Kunsthaus Bregenz, Austria (2006); and "Less Is Still More", Museum Haus Esters, Krefeld, Germany (2013). He made his American debut in the "Projects" series at the Museum of Modern Art.

A retrospective of Craig-Martin's work took place at the Whitechapel Gallery in London in 1989. In 2006, the Irish Museum of Modern Art presented "Michael Craig-Martin: Works 1964–2006" which included works from over 40 years of Craig-Martin's career. The exhibition showed around 50 paintings, sculptures, wall drawings, neon works and text pieces by the artist, covering everything from his sculptures to digital works. One of his works called On the Table (1970) involved four metal buckets suspended on a table, exemplifying the influence of Minimalism and Conceptualism on Craig-Martin. An Oak Tree (1973), consisting of "an ordinary glass of water on an equally plain shelf, accompanied by a text in which Craig-Martin asserts the supremacy of the artist's intention over the object itself ... is now widely regarded as a turning point in the development of conceptual art".

In 2015, Craig-Martin's exhibition "Transience" at the Serpentine Galleries brought together works from 1981 to 2015, including representations of once familiar yet obsolete technology; laptops, games consoles, black-and-white televisions and incandescent lightbulbs that highlighted the increasing transience of technological innovation. In the same year, Craig-Martin coordinated the Royal Academy Summer Exhibition, where he invited several artists from his generation. In 2024, a retrospective opened at the Royal Academy in London.

== Collections ==
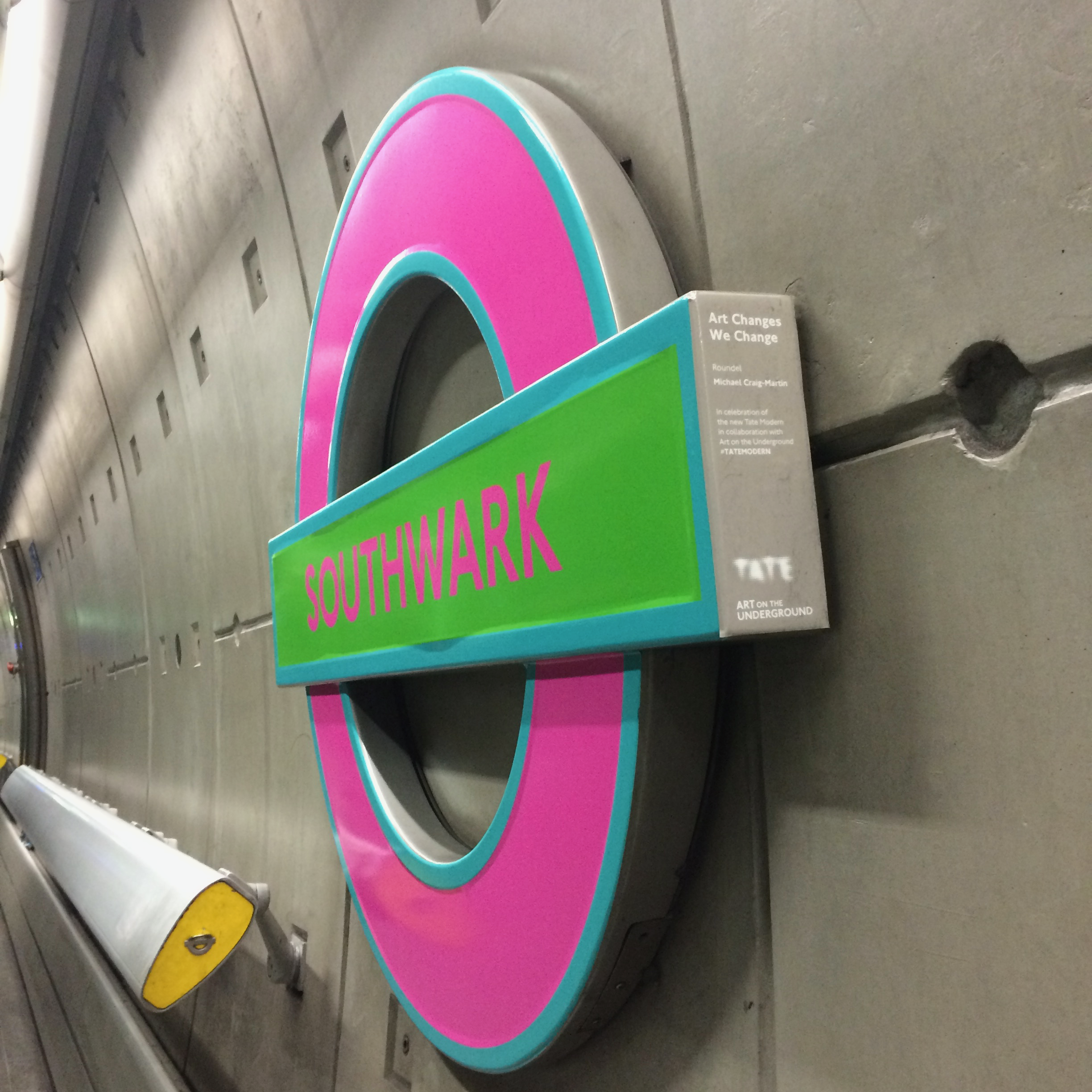
Craig-Martin's London Underground roundel design at Southwark Station in celebration of the new Tate Modern

Craig-Martin's work is represented in public collections worldwide, including:

- Australian National Gallery, Canberra, Australia
- Centre Georges Pompidou, Paris, France
- Bibliothèque Nationale, Paris, France
- Irish Museum of Modern Art, Dublin, Ireland
- Arts Council of Great Britain, United Kingdom
- British Council, United Kingdom
- Government Art Collection, United Kingdom
- Victoria and Albert Museum, London, United Kingdom
- Tate, London, United Kingdom
- Museum of Modern Art, New York, USA
- Harvard University Art Museums, Cambridge, USA
- Yale Center for British Art, Connecticut, USA

== Personal life ==
Craig-Martin met Jann Hashey while at Yale University, and married her in 1963. The couple had a daughter, Jessica Craig-Martin, now a photographer. The marriage ended in 1976 when Craig-Martin came out as gay. Craig-Martin is one-eighth Chinese, as his great-grandmother was a native of Wuhan, China.

Craig-Martin was appointed a Commander of the Order of the British Empire (CBE) in the 2001 Birthday Honours. Craig-Martin was knighted in the 2016 Birthday Honours for services to art.

== See also ==
- What Do Artists Do All Day?
