= Tim Head =

British artist

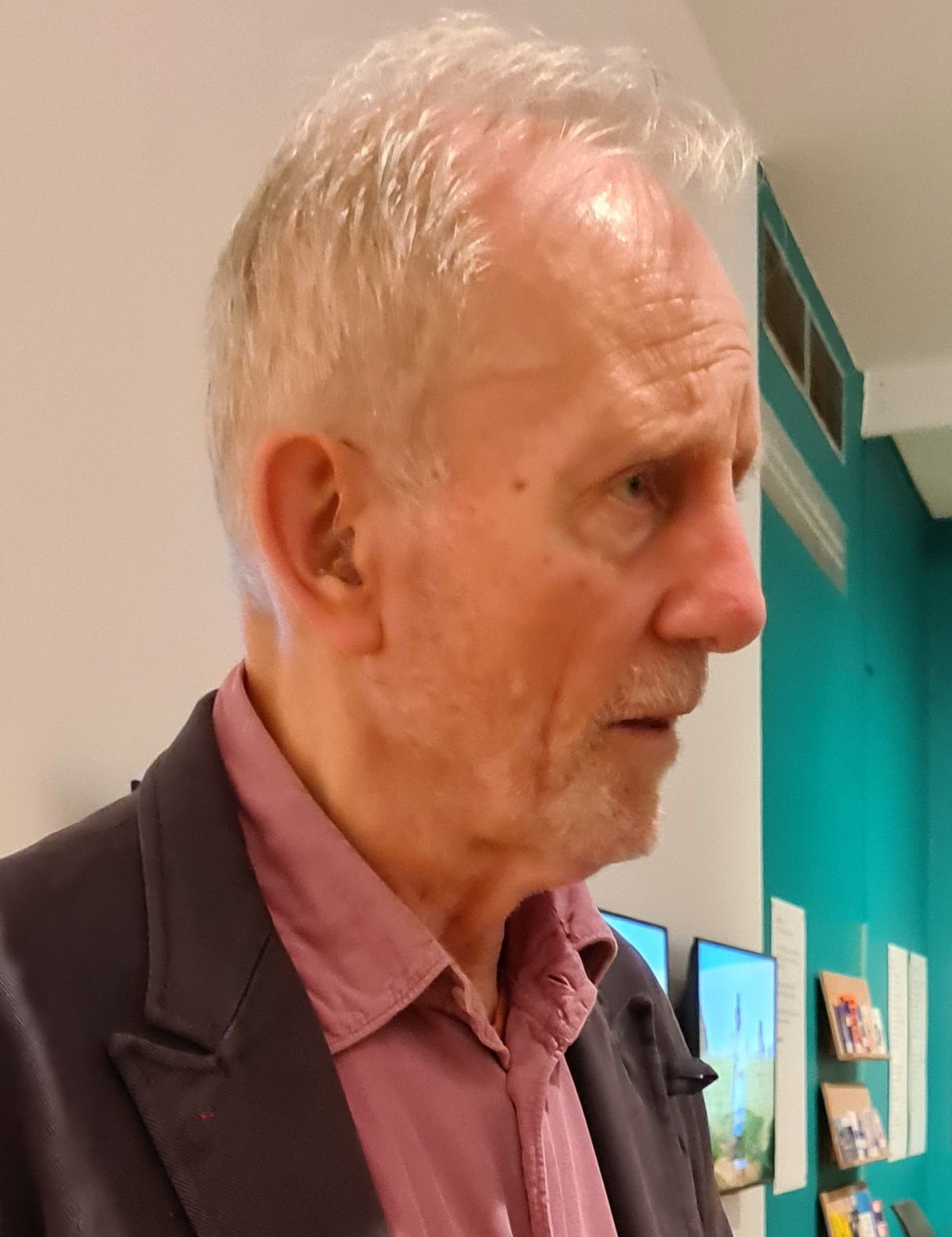
- Tim Head at the Tate Britain Annual Party, 2024
- Born: 1946 (age 79–80); London, England
- Education: University of Newcastle upon Tyne (1965–1969)
- Known for: Painting, photography, sculpture
- Awards: John Moores Painting Prize, 1987

Tim Head (born 1946) is a British artist. A painter, photographer and sculptor, he employs mixed media.

== Biography ==
Born in London, Head was brought up in Yorkshire. He studied at the University of Newcastle upon Tyne from 1965 to 1969. There the professor was Kenneth Rowntree, whose French-influenced work did not appeal; his other teachers included Richard Hamilton who enthused him, and Ian Stephenson. He was among the group of student friends of Roxy Music frontman Bryan Ferry at the university, along with the older artist Stephen Buckley. Others, besides Buckley, Ferry and Head, who were influenced by Hamilton at Newcastle were the students Rita Donagh and the sculptor Tony Carter, and Mark Lancaster who was teaching.

Head worked on exhibition layout at the Stedelijk Museum Amsterdam in summer 1967, for Niki de Saint Phalle. The following year he went to New York City, where he worked as a summer assistant to Claes Oldenburg. He met Robert Smithson, Richard Serra, Eva Hesse, Sol LeWitt, John Cale and others. Head attended Saint Martin's School of Art, London, in 1969–1970; he studied on the Advanced Sculpture Course run by Barry Flanagan.

In 1971 he worked as an assistant to Robert Morris on his Tate Gallery show. He then taught at Goldsmiths College, London, from 1971 to 1979. He taught at the Slade School of Fine Art from 1976 to 2011.

== Works ==
During the 1970s Head contributed to the interest in "projected art" with "installations in which photos of objects in gallery spaces were projected on to those same objects and spaces." In 1987 he won the 15th John Moores Painting Prize for his work "Cow Mutations". The 2002 video installation Treacherous Light used software to make pixel-wise colour changes.

Head has exhibited widely internationally. His solo shows include MoMA, Oxford (1972); Whitechapel Art Gallery, London (1974 and 1992); British Pavilion, Venice Biennale (1980); ICA, London (1985); and Kunstverein Freiburg, Germany, and touring (1995). He has taken part in group shows including Documenta VI, Kassel (1977); British Art Now: An American Perspective, Solomon R Guggenheim Museum, New York, and Royal Academy, London (1980); The British Art Show, Arts Council Tour (1984); Gambler, Building One, London (1990);Live in Your Head: Concept and Experiment in Britain 1965-75, Whitechapel Art Gallery, London (2000); and The Indiscipline of Painting Tate St. Ives touring to Warwick Art Centre (2011/12).
