= Gerard Hemsworth =

British artist (1945–2021)

Professor Gerard Hemsworth
- Born: Gerard Christopher Hemsworth; 27 December 1945; London, England
- Died: 15 February 2021 (aged 75); Robertsbridge, East Sussex, England
- Education: Saint Martin's School of Art
- Known for: conceptual art, painting
- Awards: Royal Academy Summer Exhibition Charles Wollaston Prize
- Website: http://gerardhemsworth.com/

Gerard Hemsworth (27 December 1945 – 15 February 2021) was a British contemporary artist and painter known for his contributions to British conceptual art. In 2000, he was the winner of the Royal Academy Summer Exhibition Charles Wollaston Prize with his work 'Between Heaven and Hell'.

== Early life ==
Hemsworth was born in Tooting, south London, son of Ernest Hemsworth, an electrical engineer, and his wife Mary (née Corbett). He attended St Gerard’s secondary school in Clapham before studying at Saint Martin's School of Art from 1963 to 1968.

== Career ==
After graduating from St Martin's in 1967, Hemsworth, along with David Evison, Peter Hide and other graduates from St Martin's sculpture department, set up a studio space in a disused warehouse near Stockwell Underground Station. This came to be known as Stockwell Depot, and Hemsworth showed at the yearly exhibitions until 1969, when his work moved further into conceptualism, deviating from the work done by other artists at the Depot at the time.

Initially his work was associated with the conceptual art practices of the late 1960s/1970s. His early works included sculpture and text-based wall pieces, and by the early 1980s it had expanded to include painting and print-making. His recent work shows the development of his distinct style of painting, utilising simple lines and shapes often showing whimsical characters and scenes.

In the early 80s, Hemsworth began teaching at Goldsmiths and ran the MFA and MA Fine Art Program. That the name Goldsmiths was to become synonymous with a new kind of British art was in large part owing to his teaching. In 2004, Hemsworth was appointed Professor of Fine Art at Goldsmiths, University of London. He was made Emeritus Professor on his retirement in 2011. Hemsworth was also an advisor at the Rijksakademie van beeldende kunsten between 1990 and 1995.

== Exhibitions ==
In 1967, he was selected to participate in one of the annual New Contemporaries exhibitions, started with the goal of highlighting and supporting emerging artists.

Hemsworth had his first solo exhibition at the Nigel Greenwood Gallery in London in 1970. Since the 70s he has continued to exhibit his work both in the UK and internationally. The first of his text-based wall pieces appeared in the Wall Show at the Lisson Gallery in 1970 and in 1972 Hemsworth showed in Survey of the Avant-Garde in Britain at Gallery House, London. In 1995 he exhibited with the BANK art collective in the show titled Cocaine Orgasm.

In 2019 a retrospective of Hemsworth's early text works was shown at Palfrey Gallery in London. The exhibition showed 9 text works by the artist from 1973. Another retrospective of Hemsworth's early works and involvement within Gallery House in 1972 was shown at Raven Row in London in 2017.

== Personal life ==
Hemsworth married firstly May Davidson in 1964. They had a son and a daughter, Matthew and Jane, before divorcing in 1973. He was married secondly to Susan Ormerod, a photographic artist, in 1981. They had three children; Ruby, Jack and Frankie.

== Death ==
Hemsworth died on 15 February 2021, at the age of 75. He was survived by his second wife and his five children.
