= Rita Donagh =

British artist

Rita A Donagh
- Born: 30 April 1939 (age 87); Wednesbury, Staffordshire
- Education: University of Durham
- Spouse: Richard Hamilton (artist)

Rita A Donagh (born 30 April 1939) is a British artist, known for her realistic paintings and painstaking draughtsmanship.

== Early life and education ==
Donagh was born in Wednesbury to an English mother and an Irish father and grew up in Darlaston (then Staffordshire, now West Midlands). Donagh began taking classes in life drawing at Bilston College of Further Education in 1954. She studied fine arts at the University of Durham. Donagh taught at the University of Newcastle upon Tyne where she met Richard Hamilton, whom she later married. She also taught at the University of Reading, the Slade School of Art, and Goldsmiths, University of London.

== Career ==
Her first solo show was at the Nigel Greenwood Gallery in 1972. The Whitworth Art Gallery, Manchester held a retrospective (which toured) in 1977. In the 1960s and 1970s, her work was largely conceptual with her Irish ancestry contributing to the subject of many works depicting the political situation in Northern Ireland. Rita Donagh's work on the H Block prisons in Northern Ireland was shown with her husband Richard Hamilton, at the Institute of Contemporary Art in 1984. Hamilton's influence of collage and oil paint showed up in her works of the 1970s.

Later, she focused on the human figure including such work as Slade of 1994. She continued her interest in politics with works such as Downing Street Declaration (1993) which included a Hamilton-esque, televised image of Prime Minister John Major.

In 1994 she had a solo exhibition at Cornerhouse, Manchester and the preview on 13 October coincided with the Loyalist's in Northern Ireland calling a ceasefire.

Donagh, who was widowed in 2011, lives and works in Oxfordshire.

Her work is in the permanent collection of the Tate Gallery.

== Selected exhibitions ==
=== Solo exhibitions ===
- 1972 - Nigel Greenwood Gallery, London
- 1975 - 'Display', The Gallery, London
- 1977 - Rita Donagh Paintings and Drawings, Whitworth Art Gallery, Manchester, Touring to Central Art Gallery, Wolverhampton; Arts Council of Northern Ireland Gallery, Belfast; Northern Centre for Contemporary Art, Sunderland; Museum of Modern Art, Oxford
- 1982 - Nigel Greenwood Gallery, London
- 1983 -Orchard Gallery, Derry
- 1984 - ICA Gallery, London and Central School of Art and Design, London
- 1994 - 197419841994, Cornerhouse, Manchester, Camden Arts Centre, London; Irish Museum of Modern Art, Dublin

=== Group exhibitions ===
- 1958 - Young Contemporaries, London
- 1959 - Young Contemporaries, London
- 1960 - Bear Lane Gallery, Oxford
- 1972 - John Moores Exhibition 8, Liverpool (prize-winner), and Drawings, Museum of Modern Art, Oxford
- 1973 - I I English Artists, Kunsthalle, Baden-Baden and Kunsthalle, Bremen
- 1974 - British Painting, Hayward Gallery, London
- 1975 - 7th International Festival of Painting, Cagnes sur Mer, France, and Contemporary British Drawings, 13th Biennale, São Paulo, and Body and Soul, Walker Art Gallery, Liverpool
- 1976 - Arte Inglese Oggi, Palazzo Reale, Milan
- 1978 - Hayward Annual '78, Hayward Gallery, London, and Nigel Greenwood Gallery, London, and Art for Society, Whitechapel Art Gallery, London
- 1979 - European Dialogue, Sydney Biennale
- 1980 - The Newcastle Connection, Newcastle upon Tyne
- 1983 - The Granada Connection, Whitworth Art Gallery, Manchester
- 1985 - Painting and Photography, St. Martin's School of Art, London, and Hayward Annual '85, Hayward Gallery, London
- 1986 - Nigel Greenwood Gallery, London
- 1987 - Attitudes to Ireland, Tate Gallery, London
- 1992 - A Centenary Exhibition, University of Reading, and Declarations of War, Kettle's Yard, Cambridge
- 1993 - Writing on the Wall, Tate Gallery, London
- 1996 - Face a l'Histoire, Centre Georges Pompidou, Paris
- 1998 - Lines of Desire, Oldham Art Gallery and Museum
- 2001 - Closer Still, The Winchester Gallery, Winchester
- 2002 - Display, Tate Modern, London

== Public collections ==
- Arts Council Collection, Hayward Gallery, London
- British Council
- Leeds City Art Gallery
- Hunterian Art Gallery, University of Glasgow
- Tate
- Ulster Museum - National Museums and Galleries of Northern Ireland
- Whitworth Art Gallery, University of Manchester
- Victoria and Albert Museum
- Hatton Gallery, University of Newcastle upon Tyne
- Imperial War Museum
- The New Art Gallery Walsall

== Bibliography ==
- Rita Donagh: Paintings and Drawings (exhibition catalog, ed. M. Regan; Manchester, U. Manchester, Whitworth A.G., 1977)
- Rita Donagh 197419841994: Paintings and Drawings (exhibition catalog, essay Dr. Sarat Maharaj, Manchester, Cornerhouse, 1994)
- Civil Rights etc.: Rita Donagh and Richard Hamilton (exhibition catalog, Dublin, Dublin City Gallery The Hugh Lane, 2011)
