= Private Parts & Pieces VIII: New England =

Studio album by Anthony Phillips
- Released: August 1992
- Recorded: June 1991–February 1992
- Studios: Vic's Place, Clapham, London
- Genre: Acoustic
- Length: 64:43
- Label: Venture
- Producer: Anthony Phillips

Anthony Phillips chronology
Slow Dance (1990)	Private Parts & Pieces VIII: New England (1992)	Sail the World (1994)

Private Parts & Pieces VIII: New England is a studio album by English multi-instrumentalist and composer Anthony Phillips. It was released in August 1992 on Venture Records as the eighth edition of his Private Parts & Pieces album series.

The album was reissued in 1995 and 2010, the latter as a double release with Private Parts & Pieces VII: Slow Waves, Soft Stars (1987). In 2016, the album was included in the Private Parts & Pieces V–VIII box set.

== Background and recording ==
By 1990, Phillips had secured a contract with the publishing division of Virgin Records for his film and television work, which also allowed him to release new albums on the label. After the release of Slow Dance (1990), his first for Virgin, Phillips decided to return to his Private Parts & Pieces album series and start work on the eighth instalment. Virgin had started reissuing his back catalogue, and the final group of albums that were put out were the fifth, sixth, and seventh editions of Private Parts & Pieces. Phillips felt the time was right to coincide this with the next edition in the series containing "new material in a similar genre". Phillips had started the series with the aim of releasing "The kind of material you wouldn't consider putting on another kind of album. It wouldn't fit with a fully arranged song or a fully arranged instrumental piece."

Phillips received a small advance for the album, prompting him to dedicate a period of time writing new material to have "something that was wholly new and good and not dredge bits up off the shelf". Writing began in March 1991 while Phillips was visiting Devon and continued in April and May. Phillips described this period as "wonderful", and came up with some "big long six string pieces" which he preferred to keep for a later album, as well as some technical piano compositions. He found, however, that he was putting himself under pressure in coming up with "definitive pieces" in the variety of styles that he was coming up with, such as the instruments themselves and "the kind of intimate song" he wanted. All of which, he later thought, was a mistake as he wanted to produce quality material for his first post-Virgin contract album but encountered wrist trouble from overworking his technique, something that was not the case in his previous Private Parts & Pieces albums.

In June 1991, Phillips had amassed enough material that he was satisfied with and started recording at Vic's Place, a running joke in reference to his home studio in Clapham, south London. It was recorded on 16-track. After recording was put on hold by the month's end, Phillips resumed in November 1991 and worked through until February 1992. By the time recording finished, Phillips had around 100 minutes of finished music.

The album features guest musicians: Martin Robertson, Simon Morris, Paul Clarvis, and Japanese musician Joji Hirota. When it came to "Pieces of Eight" Phillips was unsure how to develop it further, and suggested to Patterson that "some low sounding percussion drumming through it might work", so he brought in Hirota to play the part. The two first worked with each other for the documentary series Rule Britannia in the early 1980s. Phillips met Morris through a mutual friend, and Clarvis was a friend of Robertson's.

== Songs ==
"Sunrise and Seamonsters" was co-written by Phillips and Martin Robertson, who also performs on the album. The pair had worked together on various television music projects, and Robertson would visit Phillips's home and come up with material through jam sessions. It is a track that Phillips thought was "wandering into slightly different territory", and initially wanted to record it with a guitar, saxophone, and percussion. As it developed, he became wary that it was comparable to music from his first album, The Geese & the Ghost (1977).

"Unheard Cry" was developed in 1987. Phillips was inspired to write it after he saw a photograph of an Italian child born with AIDS in the 1980s, at a time when the disease was little understood by the general population and a result, was kept indoors. "It was such a horrendous idea, and the look on this child's face was just so sad and it has just become one of those images that just stays with you".

== Design ==
Phillips originally wanted to name the album Pieces of Eight, but Venture chief Declan Colgan expressed reservations towards it which Phillips appreciated as he had grown accustomed to labels accepting his title suggestions. Upon discussions with illustrator Peter Cross on cover designs, they looked ways of reintroducing a figure with a kit bag that Cross had drawn on the cover for Private Parts & Pieces (1978). In a departure from the norm, Cross had to complete a design before the music was completed and discussions between them about the American War of Independence had the region of New England come up. Colgan later suggested the title of the album and some of the tracks, including "Unheard Cry", and assisted on the album's running order.

== Track listing ==
1. "Aubade" 1:00
2. "Infra Dig" 1:44
3. "Sanctuary" 4:02
4. "La Dolorosa" 3:58
5. "New England Suite (i)" 1:46
6. "New England Suite (ii)" 4:12
7. "New England Suite (iii)" 3:41
8. "Last Goodbyes" 2:17
9. "Sunrise and Sea Monsters" 10:25
10. "Iona" 1:04
11. "Cathedral Woods" 4:16
12. "If I Could Tell You" 1:57
13. "Jaunty Roads" 1:04
14. "Spirals" 0:51
15. "Pieces of Eight (i) – Pressgang" 2:22
16. "Pieces of Eight (ii) – Sargasso" 3:12
17. "Pieces of Eight (iii) – Sea-Shanty" 4:53
18. "In the Maze" 0:54
19. "Unheard Cry" 4:00
20. "Now They've All Gone" 6:59

== Personnel ==
Credits taken from the album's 1992 sleeve notes.

Music

- Anthony Phillips – guitars, mandolin, charango, keyboards, vocals
- Martin Robertson – soprano saxophone, African drums
- Simon Morris – cello
- Paul Clarvis – rainstick, cymbals, shakers, darbouka, tabla on "Sunrise and Sea Monsters"
- Joji Hirota – rolled cymbals, prayer bell, mark tree, gong on "Sunrise and Sea Monsters", shakers, Japanese drum on "Pressgang"

Production

- Anthony Phillips – production, engineering
- Roger Patterson – mixing
- Simon Heyworth – mastering at Chop 'Em Out
- Peter Cross – illustrations
