= Private Parts and Pieces IV: A Catch at the Tables =

Studio album by Anthony Phillips
- Released: April 1984
- Recorded: October 1979–June 1982
- Studio: Send Barns, Woking, Surrey and Englewood Studios, Clapham, London
- Genre: Acoustic; electronic; instrumental
- Label: Passport
- Producer: Anthony Phillips; Richard Scott; Trevor Vallis

Anthony Phillips chronology
Invisible Men (1983)	Private Parts and Pieces IV: A Catch at the Tables (1984)	Private Parts and Pieces V: Twelve (1985)

Private Parts and Pieces IV: A Catch at the Tables is the ninth studio album by English multi-instrumentalist and composer Anthony Phillips. It was released in April 1984 by Passport Records as the fourth instalment to his generic album series, Private Parts & Pieces. A release in the United Kingdom followed in 1990 by Virgin Records.

== Background and recording ==
In October 1983, Phillips released his eighth studio album Invisible Men. At this point in his career, he was pressured into delivering more radio friendly material by his US-based label Passport Records. For his next release, Phillips decided to assemble the fourth instalment in his Private Parts & Pieces album series which showcase more "generic" tracks, including rough cuts, demos, and outtakes. This process began in the spring of 1983 after Invisible Men had been recorded. An early idea that Phillips had at this stage was to construct a suite consisting of short pieces from various library music projects he had been involved with, but this was dropped in favour of other tracks.

The material on A Catch at the Tables was recorded between October 1979 and June 1982 at two locations: Send Barns, the studio Phillips had set up at his parents’ house in Woking, Surrey, and home studio named Englewood Studios in Clapham, London following his move there in the early 1980s. Phillips received assistance from his friend Dennis Quinn in naming many of the tracks on the album, having played the demo versions to him. Previous albums by Phillips included the artwork of English author and illustrator Peter Cross, but he was unavailable to produce for A Catch at the Tables due to other projects. Instead, Phillips sought permission to use a painting by Ed Tanner which had a quality to it that he liked.

== Music ==
=== Side one ===
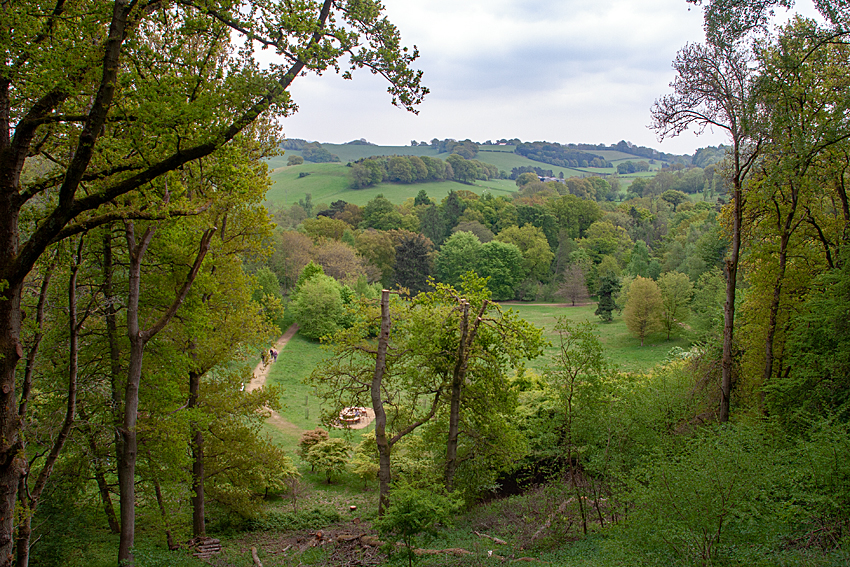
"Arboretum Suite" was inspired by Winkworth Arboretum, Surrey

"Arboretum Suite" is a suite of four-movement suite that Phillips wrote for the wedding of two friends in 1980, based on Winkworth Arboretum in Surrey. The liner notes detail a humorous description of the piece: "The music attempts to describe the social occasion as troops of bizarre-clad hikers set out in high spirits, armed with footballs and frisbees, upset the neighbours and fall in the lake before trudging their bedraggled way back to a warm fire and glorious tea". The last section, "Lights on the Hill", was a fully arranged song at first, of which producer Richard Scott had used a version for his own projects. The original instrumental version was recorded, and the positive reaction from various people encouraged Phillips to include it on his next Private Parts & Pieces album. It was recorded at Send Barns in July 1980.

"Dawn over the Lake" was recorded in March 1981. It is more experimental and improvisational that was recorded in a more spontaneous manner, with Phillips playing his 12-string guitar with unusual tuning with a Roland drum machine. He had set the machine to produce a straightforward rock drum pattern, but slowed it down to the point where it "doesn't sound like that at all". Phillips developed the track with no set intention on including it on the album. "I was just mucking around, so the track itself is edited down and the edits are not perfect but I think it's strongly atmospheric." Upon the album's release he was worried that the piece ran too long.

=== Side two ===
"Bouncer" was recorded in June 1982 when Phillips had relocated from Surrey to London, and was recording Invisible Men. It was originally intended for that album, as with "Sistine", but they were left off because Phillips felt they "didn't fit in". It was put together in the studio on his own one morning before he had breakfast. Conversely, "Eduardo" was completed during Phillips's last days while living near Woking, and features his 8-string Rudloff guitar. "Heart of Darkness" and "The Sea and the Armadillo" were also put down during this period.

=== Extra material ===
The 1990, 2012, and 2015 reissues of A Catch at the Tables include previously unreleased material. "Erotic Strings" dates from 1985, and was originally written as incidental music for the play Tropical Moon over Dorking which starred actress Pauline Collins. "A Catch at the Tables" was recorded at his London studio named Vic's Place and completed in 1990 after Phillips had decided not to have a title track on the album, but wrote it for the 1990 reissue. It was named after the front cover painting by Ed Tanner. Phillips revealed that its actual title is "A Catch for the Tables" but he had misheard Tanner, but also thought the "at" added some mystery to the title as well as a double entendre with casinos at Monte Carlo which is also depicted in Tanner's painting.

== Release ==
Professional ratings
Review scores
Source	Rating
Allmusic	3/5 stars

A Catch at the Tables was released in April 1984 by Passport Records in the United States and Canada. As Phillips's contract with RCA Records had expired following the release of Private Parts and Pieces III: Antiques in 1982, the album did not see a domestic release until 1990 by Virgin Records.

In 2012, Voiceprint Records released a 2-CD bundle of Antiques and A Catch at the Tables with bonus tracks. In 2015, Esoteric Recordings released a 5-CD box set containing the first four volumes in the Private Parts & Pieces series with additional bonus tracks.

== Track listing ==
All songs composed, performed, and produced by Anthony Phillips except "Sistine", produced by Phillips, Richard Scott, and Trevor Vallis.

Side one
No.	Title	Length
1.	"Aboretum Suite: (i) Set Piece"	2:06
2.	"Aboretum Suite: (ii) Over the Gate"	2:06
3.	"Aboretum Suite: (iii) Flapjack"	2:25
4.	"Aboretum Suite: (iv) Lights on the Hill"	5:26
5.	"Earth Man"	4:36
6.	"Dawn over the Lake"	10:50

Side two
No.	Title	Length
1.	"Bouncer"	3:05
2.	"Eduardo"	9:44
3.	"Heart of Darkness"	3:20
4.	"The Sea and the Armadillo"	4:58
5.	"Sistine"	3:55

Private Parts and Pieces IV: A Catch at the Tables — 1990 reissue bonus tracks
No.	Title	Length
12.	"Erotic Strings"	1:05
13.	"A Catch at the Tables"	2:57

Private Parts & Pieces I–IV bonus tracks
No.	Title	Length
14.	"Flapjack" (Solo Version)
15.	"Theme from Operation Whale"

== Personnel ==
Credits taken from the 1990 CD liner notes.

Music

- Anthony Phillips – 12-string guitar, 8-string Rudloff classical guitar, 6-string Ovation bass guitar, 6-string John Bailey guitar, Polymoog synthesiser, ARP 2600 synthesiser, drum machine, Mellotron, vocal on "Sistine"
- Pedro Luigi Crass - charango
- Mark Emmey – bugle on "Sistine"
- Judd Lander – bagpipes and harmonica on "Sistine"

Production

- Anthony Phillips – production, 1990 CD remastering
- Simon Heyworth – 1990 CD remastering
- Trevor Vallis – production on "Sistine"
- Richard Scott – production on "Sistine"
- Ian "That Sounds Bloody Awful" Cooper – cutting at Townhouse Studios, London
- Ed Tanner – painting
- Elsworth – original painting and cover design
