= 1984 (Anthony Phillips album) =

Studio album by Anthony Phillips
- Released: June 1981
- Recorded: 14 August 1980–January 1981
- Studios: Send Barns, Woking, Surrey
- Genre: Progressive rock
- Length: 41.26
- Label: RCA
- Producer: Anthony Phillips

Anthony Phillips chronology
Private Parts & Pieces II: Back to the Pavilion (1980)	1984 (1981)	Private Parts & Pieces III: Antiques (1982)

Singles from 1984
- 1. "Prelude '84"/"Anthem 1984" Released: 10 July 1981

1984 is the sixth studio album by English musician and composer Anthony Phillips, released in June 1981 on RCA Records. The record represents a radical stylistic departure for Phillips, abandoning the acoustic and pastoral folk arrangements of his earlier solo work in favour of an electronic, synthesizer-oriented sound.

Composed as an instrumental suite divided into multi-movement structures, the album was recorded at Phillips's home studio in Send, Surrey, between August 1980 and January 1981. The music was titled after George Orwell's dystopian 1949 novel Nineteen Eighty-Four following the completion of its recording sessions, which was reinforced by the cover art. 1984 is framed around two side-long continuous pieces, "1984 Part 1" and "1984 Part 2", with two shorter opening and closing pieces, "Prelude '84" and "Anthem 1984".

Upon release, critics were highly polarised by the electronic transition and paired with a lack of radio friendly singles, resulted in a commercial failure, with 1984 failing to chart. The subsequent financial strain forced Phillips to abandon large-scale studio productions and pivot back to his cheaper, home-recorded Private Parts & Pieces series. In the decades following its release, 1984 has undergone a critical re-evaluation for its innovative layering of analogue synthesizers and its dark, cinematic atmosphere.

== Background ==
In June 1980, at the time of the release of Private Parts & Pieces II: Back to the Pavilion, the second in his Private Parts & Pieces album series, Phillips was still under contract with the US-based independent label Passport Records but without one in the UK as his deal with Arista Records had come to an end with the release of Sides in 1979. During this time he was considering ideas for his next studio album; one that particularly interested him the most was a recording which would combine classical-influenced synthesizer sounds with mechanical rock rhythms. He wished to incorporate a rhythm throughout in an effort to avoid the composition having a "background music" feel, and, as he recalled, a take on being reminded by record companies at the time that music had to have a rhythm to it, so he thought of such an album but "disguise it with some classical bits on top". One source of inspiration to write in this style originated when Phillips added two synthesisers to his collection two years prior, the Polymoog and ARP 2600, but felt he had not used them effectively on Sides. An album with both featured as the main instruments became attractive to him; looking back on the project, it "was actually a challenge". One reason was because of the difficulty of keeping the oscillator on the ARP 2600 in tune to produce a sound he desired, resulting in the instrument sounding "flat" in some sections.

== Writing ==
Phillips originally planned to present 1984 as three instrumental pieces, one of which was a Polymoog piece from the Sides recording sessions that was left unused. A second featured a 12-string guitar that was also left off. He then considered using them to produce a "quick instrumental album", but the project grew after he persuaded his manager, Tony Smith, that it was the right time to make an instrumental album with a large scale piece of music because he had wished to do one since his first album, The Geese & the Ghost (1977). Phillips put the initial two pieces aside, and started work on one keyboard-based composition that he described as a "modern, short five minute piece" which he expanded upon to become the basis of the "1984" suite. As he went through his musical ideas for the track, he questioned whether the arrangements had any form to them, and whether they confirmed to a particular convention of compositional form, but he dismissed the idea and carried on writing as he saw fit. Creating a keyboard heavy album made Phillips improve his technique, as the technology available at the time of recording did not allow for corrections to be made afterwards using computer software. The ARP 2600 was a difficult keyboard for Phillips to play as the model would not play the next note if he had stumbled while playing a fast sequence, causing him to start again.

In May 1980, two months prior to recording material for 1984, Phillips recorded two pieces around the synthesiser and drum machine and gave them the working titles "Instrumental Single" and "Strings & Drums". The basic parts of each were put down quickly; Phillips estimated no longer than three to four hours. After he had decided upon the album's direction, Phillips felt both tracks fitted the theme and became "Prelude '84" and "Anthem 1984", respectively. The latter half of "1984 Part 2" features Phillips's vocals fed through a vocoder, which he incorporated during the process of adding the overdubs.

Though the album borrows the name, and artwork depicting imagery, from George Orwell's dystopian novel Nineteen Eighty-Four (1949), Phillips clarified that the only real connection between the album and the story was that the book had "a nice title". He named the album late in the production stage, after the music had been recorded. He wanted a title that had a sense of drama behind it, as opposed to a more "dreamy" one. After deciding on 1984 as the title, Phillips revisited the composition and "nastied the music up in one or two places".

== Recording ==
1984 was recorded from 14 August 1980 to January 1981 at Send Barns, Phillips's recording facility set up at his parents’ house in Woking, Surrey. It was put down on 8-track Ampex tape. The first parts put down were the drum machine and percussion tracks with assistance from Phillips's friend Richard Scott, who is credited in the liner notes for helping with production and engineering. Scott also listened to rough mixes of the tracks that Phillips had completed for feedback. The keyboards were recorded after, and the basic tracks had been put to tape by January 1981. Phillips then decided that music needed further parts and overdubs, but there was insufficient space on the 8-track recording. The recorded parts were then transferred onto 24-track tape at Atmosphere Studios in London where recording engineer Chris David painstakingly reassembled the various sections of the piece by hand, cutting pieces of tape off when required. David then made a master tape, making more edits for 1984 than any other studio project he had worked on as Phillips had recorded the album in sections between 20 and 60 seconds in length, "more or less in order which helped with the assembly", but he recalled mistakes made and a restart in the process. To track what parts were recorded onto which track, David recalled a "film-style cue sheet approach" to avoid losing place. David's efforts for 1984 required him to cut short his honeymoon in Kenya. Phillips used a Roland CR-78 drum machine, and borrowed percussion instruments from Phil Collins. He arranged a session with Morris Pert to record the percussive sections, all of which were put down in one day. It was then mixed at Atmosphere Studios in February and March 1981.

== Artwork ==
The album is the first of Phillips's albums not to feature artwork by Peter Cross. Instead, the change in style of music is represented in the sleeve design, replacing the more detailed, fantasy-inspired, and hand drawn illustrations for a dark and more minimalist feel designed by Under the Stairs Productions. Phillips felt Cross's style would not have fit the musical direction of the album. The cover depicts an open small cage with a black background, a reference to the cage affixed to the head of Winston Smith, the protagonist in Nineteen Eighty-Four when he is taken to Room 101. The album's liner notes includes the line: "Peter Cross is on holiday with Ralph Bernascone", part of a running joke in whereby "Ralph Bernascone" is mentioned in the liner notes of several of Phillips' albums.

== Release ==
When Phillips first presented 1984 to Smith, he remembered Smith saying "It works", before leaving the room. Smith then approached management at RCA Records with the aim of the label releasing other material from Phillips and presented 1984 to them after, which it liked and agreed to put out with an advance, without which Phillips would not have been able to purchase a new home. RCA also agreed to release 1984 to several European markets, for which "Prelude '84" was released as the lead single in the UK and Spain. Phillips was surprised that such a major label agreed to release it.

=== Reception ===
Professional ratings
Review scores
Source	Rating
AllMusic	3.5/5 stars

Alan Coulthard gave a positive review of the "Prelude '84" single in Record Mirror, writing: "It's about time that the ex-Genesis guitarist received the attention his undoubted talent warrants, and this release is surely the one to bring him to a wider audience". He went on to describe the track's "powerful" and "moody, spherical tones" which he could appreciate out of context to the rest of the album or the novel itself. In the US, Joan Tortorici Ruppert wrote a positive review in the Illinois Entertainer. She thought that despite being a "compact instrumental story", the album avoids falling into "any of the normal traps" and displays Phillips's "keyboard savvy" which results in a "lean and tidy effort". Ruppert continued: "'1984' moves from 'Prelude' to 'Anthem' without excessive drama; the themes don't make themselves particularly obvious. But you do travel from an energetic, mechanized, non-frantic ambience to a slow, emotionally thick resolution, a peaceful, yet somehow melancholy shift during the last few moments". She wondered what Phillips had in mind while writing the piece, but such "mystery adds much to the enjoyment". In a review published in Boston Rock, reviewer Marc English commented on the flow of the album, that "Basic themes are embellished and then transposed into other forms causing the album to literally flow from beginning to end". He noted the music is "far from Orwellian", it is "sprightly, almost happy music". English concluded that 1984 was perhaps meant to be more optimistic in nature with electronic instruments of the day, which he then wrote: "Sounds good to me".

Jim Aikin for Keyboard magazine praised the "solid" album which he thought displayed elements of "the quasi-orchestral Genesis mold", with "highly dramatic riffs" and "consistently excellent and sometimes spectacular" orchestration which maintains the listener's interest. Aikin suggested 1984 could have been named "something more original". The Las Vegas Sun published a review from Dennishee Askew, who recognised Phillips's exploration outside the boundaries of progressive rock music. She praised "some brilliant ensemble movements that blend in and out of subtle melodies" and the "crispy produced" music, "arranged in a fashion that takes the monotony out of their long journey from beginning to end". Ron Kress hailed 1984 in the Princetown Spectrum, pointing out that Phillips had undergone a change in musical direction, abandoning "the path of his initial five albums and journeys into percussive, electronic fantasy". He thought the album creates a "pseudo-cinematic effect", and rated it "the best electronic album to date".

=== Reissues ===
In July 2007, a remastered 2-disc version of 1984 was released in Japan by Arcangelo Records with a limited edition mini vinyl sleeve. A standard jewel case version was released by Voiceprint Records in June 2008. Both releases contained a bonus disc with a new stereo mix from the original 8-track masters. Dann had the original reels sent to FX in Acton, London for processing where they were baked and transferred onto digital format where a new mix was constructed. The set also contains music Phillips recorded for the 1981 UK television series Rule Britannia: Pictures of a People Like Us which was recorded at the same time as 1984; "Ascension", a track rediscovered on the original multi-track tapes during the research for the reissue; and the 16-minute demo of "Poly Piece", originally written for inclusion on Sides and considered for inclusion for 1984 in the formative stages of the album. It contains a booklet with extensive liner notes by Jonathan Dann.

On 24 June 2016, Esoteric Recordings released a 3-disc Deluxe Edition of 1984 with new stereo and 5.1 surround sound mixes, the latter on DVD, plus a disc of the bonus tracks included in the 2007 reissue. Also included is a poster and a 16-page booklet with photos and Dann's essay.

== Track listing ==
All tracks written by Anthony Phillips.

Side one
No.	Title	Length
1.	"Prelude '84"	4:19
2.	"1984 Part 1"	19:06

Side two
No.	Title	Length
1.	"1984 Part 2"	15:28
2.	"Anthem 1984"	2:27

2007 and 2016 reissue bonus CD
No.	Title	Length
1.	"Prelude '84" (Early Stage Mix)	4:26
2.	"Ascension"	5:16
3.	"1984 – Part One" (Early Stage Mix)	12:49
4.	"Rule Britannia Suite": i) "Sally Theme"; ii) "Science & Technology"; iii) "Respect"; iv) "Church"; v) "Military"; vi) "Power in the Land"	7:41
5.	"1984 – Part Two" (Early Stage Mix)	4:25
6.	"Anthem 1984" (Early Stage Mix)	2:08
7.	"Poly Piece" (Demo)	16:39

== Personnel ==
Credits are taken from the 1981 sleeve notes.

Music

- Anthony Phillips – keyboards, Roland CR-78 drum machine, occasional guitar, basic percussion
- Richard Scott – basic percussion, effects, vocal ideas
- Morris Pert – percussion (tympani, tambourine, gong, congas, bell tree, vibraslap, marimba, vibes)

Production

- Anthony Phillips – production, engineering
- Richard Scott – production and engineering assistant
- Chris David – engineering, vocoder manipulation
- Anita David – vocoder manipulation
- Under the Stairs Productions – cover design
- Ray Staff – disc cutter at Trident Studios
- Hit & Run Music Publishing – publishing
