= Slow Dance (Anthony Phillips album) =

Studio album by Anthony Phillips
- Released: 24 September 1990
- Recorded: June 1988–March 1989
- Studios: Vic's Place, Clapham and CBS Studios, London
- Genre: Progressive rock
- Length: 50:28
- Label: Virgin
- Producers: Anthony Phillips; Simon Heyworth

Anthony Phillips chronology
Missing Links Volume One: Finger Painting (1989)	Slow Dance (1990)	Private Parts & Pieces VIII: New England (1992)

Slow Dance is a studio album by English musician and composer Anthony Phillips, released in September 1990 by Virgin Records. Conceived as a synth-acoustic hybrid, the album was recorded over an extended period between 1988 and 1989 and blends keyboards with acoustic guitars and live classical instrumentation. Musically, the album consists of just two, side-long movements titled "Slow Dance (Part One)" and "Slow Dance (Part Two)".

The project was originally commissioned in the late 1980s as a commercial instrumental piece intended for television or film use by the American independent label Passport Records. However, the label suddenly collapsed into bankruptcy, leaving Phillips without financial backing and incomplete arrangements. Determined to save the project, Phillips teamed up with producer Simon Heyworth and continued recording, embellishing the material with an orchestra.

Slow Dance finally found a commercial outlet when Phillips signed with Virgin in early 1990, a deal that saw the release of Phillips's back catalogue. Released to warm critical reviews, the record did not achieve mainstream chart success but cemented his reputation as a television and library music composer. In the decades following its release, it has been re-evaluated as one of Phillips's most accomplished works. A deluxe edition of the album was released in 2017 with a 5.1 surround sound mix and bonus material.

== Background and writing ==
In the 1980s, Phillips's musical output had changed direction towards "very simple albums, trying to do pop stuff just to stay alive". However, the lack of commercial success with his releases led him to focus on his Private Parts & Pieces series of albums that centred around pieces of a smaller scale. The rise in new-age music towards the end of the decade had prompted him to "crank it up a bit" and gather material of an orchestral nature that he had written years before and combine it with fresh ideas for a new studio album of a large scale. This marked his first "full-scale" album since the release of Invisible Men (1983), during which he was able to collect a considerable number of ideas for the project.

During the closing stages of his collaboration album Tarka with Harry Williamson in December 1987, Phillips began to write Slow Dance which he initially found "daunting" and for a while, avoided working on it. Once Phillips had gained some momentum, he recalled that "working on a big canvas" once more was an exciting one and felt particularly inspired from the frustration in not having been able to have an outlet for the larger scale ideas he had accumulated. Phillips's enthusiasm for the project resulted in four long pieces outlined in two months: one each based on the piano and 12-string guitar, and two of varied styles and arrangements which he thought resembled a film soundtrack. He opted to develop the latter two, keeping the material that he felt had "more change, more dynamics, more spacey". Phillips also felt encouraged to produce a large scale work to demonstrate to others that he could score full-length films.

To help fund the album's production, Phillips was able to secure an advance from the US-based independent label Passport Records, something he had been unable to get since the late 1970s. With his earnings from Tarka and a loan from his publisher Hit & Run Music Phillips upgraded his studio equipment, replacing his 8-track recording machine with two Fostex E16 16-track machines and a new Soundtrack mixing desk, thus allowing him to produce more dense recordings. Phillips continued writing which coincided with a positive time in his life; "[Everything] just went well at the time which is a good way to be when you are really firing". However, after the four pieces had been written, Phillips learned during a subsequent visit to the US in May 1988 that Passport Records had ceased trading, leaving the label unable to pay the promised advance. Phillips felt fortunate that the collapse happened after the material for Slow Dance was complete and not after, as he was sure that he would have abandoned the project. In the course of the following eight "nerve racking" months Phillips, now without a label, in debt, and with no immediate way of repaying what he had borrowed from management, doubted whether the album would ever be made, let alone released. Phillips considered returning to television work to pay dividends but despite the setback, Phillips chose to carry on and make the album rather than scale it down or abandon it completely: "It was a card I felt I had to play, as I had no obvious others". He purposefully kept the bad news to himself due to embarrassment yet remained positive, helped by the hope of Slow Dance leading to further work later on. Upon returning from the US, Phillips had to re-record the parts that he had put down. On the fourth day, he accidentally wiped the programmed drum box rhythms that he had made for the composition.

== Composition ==
"Slow Dance" is an instrumental composition composed by Phillips that is divided into two parts. He described it as a piece that "doesn't hang around", as it changes in tempo and mood throughout. The first half, he said, is slow to get going but it covers a greater number of ideas which originate from pieces written between 1984 and 1987. The first five minutes of the composition took two weeks to write. He compared the main recurring melody in the piece sounded like the Enigma Variations by Edward Elgar. One difficulty that Phillips had was arranging the piece so it flowed to whereby "at the end of the album, it sort of made sense of what had gone on before". As he pieced different sections of music together he wanted them to fit musically "in the grander scheme" of the composition. In early 1988, during the early stages of conception Phillips replaced the older synthesisers that he had used on 1984 (1981) including the ARP 2600 and Polymoog with newer models such as the Roland Jupiter-8 and E-mu Emax I, his first sampling synthesiser. The Jupiter-8 was used to write and record the string sequence. Phillips maintained that the only computerised part in the recording was when he used the Yamaha QX5 Sequencer on Part Two. When he reached the end of arranging the piece, he looked back: "I got the feeling that it was like the end of a journey realising that something that worked at the beginning worked at the conclusion".

== Recording ==
Slow Dance was recorded from June 1988 to March 1989 at Vic's Place, a name for Phillips' home studio in Clapham, London. Its initial working title was Album '88. Having borrowed a sum of money from other sources, Phillips was able to hire a group of session musicians to play the parts he had arranged, a risk he was willing to take as he occasionally had thoughts of the album being successful to the point of relieving him of financial situation. Among them were Ian Hardwick on oboe and Julie Allis on harp, who had played on Tarka, and Martin Robertson on clarinet, who was also on Invisible Men. They were completed with Michael Cox on flute and piccolo and Tjborn Holtmark on trumpet. When Phillips thought the album would benefit from percussion, he asked Frank Ricotti, who had also played on Sides and devised what Phillips described as "some wonderful percussion parts" after playing the composition to him section by section.

As the first side neared completion, Phillips reunited with his longtime producer Simon Heyworth who took an interest in the style of the album. Heyworth advised Phillips on recording for the second part, including the idea of linking the two Fostex machines to make recording easier and more efficient. At the closing stages of recording both parts of the composition, Phillips decided to incorporate a real string section as Heyworth believed the string sound he had achieved on the Jupiter-8 did not carry the music through. Despite Phillips having insufficient funds to cover the cost, Heyworth paid for the session which took place at CBS Studios in central London in February 1989. Phillips noted that the timbre of the real string section and the sampled strings he had played on his keyboards did not match. After Phillips prepared a final mix at home studio, the album underwent digital editing at CBS in March. Dave Turner then completed the final mastering.

With the album recorded, Phillips resumed composing for television and library music with the aim of recouping the debts that had mounted from producing Slow Dance. He also had sample copies of the album produced at Chop 'Em Out, a cutting facility in London that was done by Dave Turner. During this time, Phillips felt the album needed a more distinctive working title and now named it Project 2. In the summer of 1989, Phillips was contacted by management at Virgin Records who expressed an interest in releasing the album, having heard one of the promotional copies. He later learned that Simon Mortimer, who had first signed Phillips to Virgin's publishing division for his film and television work, convinced the label to release it and pay the majority of Phillips's debts. Virgin's decision to release Slow Dance also included opportunities for further film and television work and the release of his back catalogue. By the spring of 1990, Phillips had signed the deal.

The album's title was decided in the summer of 1990. Phillips said that Slow Dance was the one of many that were thought of throughout its production, including Time & Tide and Field Day. The latter was used for the name of Phillips's 2005 album. Phillips recalled that management at Virgin were not keen on titles that emphasised a new-age record, and had also suggested Responses and Millennium, but a feature film of the latter name was to be released so he scrapped it. Slow Dance was suggested by someone at Virgin who considered the album accompanying music for a ballet.

== Release ==
Professional ratings
Review scores
Source	Rating
AllMusic	3/5 stars

Slow Dance was released in the UK in September 1990, and the final of Phillips's to have a simultaneous release on CD, vinyl, and cassette. Phillips recalled the critical reviews being "very mixed", but looked back on the album as one of the projects he was more proud of, partly because of the "broader canvas" that he was able to work from which led to a work with "greater emotional pull".

On 16 June 2017, Slow Dance was reissued as a 2 CD/1 DVD Deluxe Edition digipack by Esoteric Recordings which contains the original and a new stereo mix, a 5.1 surround sound mix, and previously unreleased tracks collectively titled Slow Dance Vignettes. The package includes a poster and 16-page booklet with extensive liner notes. The new mixes were produced using records "pretty near the original masters" which Phillips and his engineers thought sounded "fifteen to twenty percent better" than using generation copies.

In 2015, Phillips expressed his wish to produce another studio album "like 'Slow Dance', in that sort of genre".

== Track listing ==
All music is composed by Anthony Phillips.

No.	Title	Length
1.	"Slow Dance (Part 1)"	23:57
2.	"Slow Dance (Part 2)"	26:27

=== 2017 reissue bonus disc ===
Track listing
No.	Title	Length
1.	"Themes from Slow Dance"	3:30
2.	"No Way Out" (Alternate Mix)	4:23
3.	"A Slower Dance"	3:36
4.	"Guitar Adagio from Slow Dance"	4:31
5.	"Touch Me Deeply" (Demo)	5:58
6.	"Clarinet Sleigh Ride"	6:54
7.	"Slow Dance Single Demo" (Alternate Mix)	7:38
8.	"No Way Out" (Original Mix with Drums)	8:21
9.	"Lenta Chorum"	1:15

== Personnel ==
Credits are adapted from the 1990 and 2017 sleeve notes.

Music

- Anthony Phillips – keyboards (E-mu Emax, Roland Jupiter-8, Casio CZ-5000, Roland TR-808 drum machine), guitars (Alvarez 12-string, Fender Stratocaster, Yari classical, Ovation 6-string), Gretsch fretless bass guitar, TOM drum machine, Yamaha QX5 Sequencer on "Slow Dance (Part 2)"
- Martin Robertson – clarinet
- Ian Hardwick – oboe
- Michael Cox – flute, piccolo
- Tjborn Holtmark – trumpet
- Julie Allis – harp
- Ian Thomas – drums
- Frank Ricotti – percussion and off spin
- John Owen Edwards – conductor
- Gavyn Wright – strings leader
- Speachi Quartet
- Ralph Bernascone – quartet conductor

Production

- Anthony Phillips – production
- Simon Heyworth – production
- Mike Ross – strings engineering, digital editing at CBS Studios
- Steve Shin – digital editing at CBS Studios
- Dave Turner – final mastering at Chop 'Em Out
- Isobel Griffiths – fixer
- Steve Murray and associates – sleeve design
