= Private Parts & Pieces III: Antiques =

Studio album by Anthony Phillips
- Released: March 1982
- Recorded: June 1981
- Studio: Send Barns, Woking, Surrey
- Genre: Contemporary folk
- Length: 44:00
- Label: Passport Records (US); RCA International (UK)
- Producer: Anthony Phillips

Anthony Phillips chronology
1984 (1981)	Private Parts & Pieces III: Antiques (1982)	Invisible Men (1983)

Professional ratings
Review scores
Source	Rating
Allmusic	2.5/5 stars

Private Parts & Pieces III: Antiques is the seventh studio album by English multi-instrumentalist and composer Anthony Phillips. It was released in March 1982 by Passport Records in the United States and in October 1982 by RCA International in the United Kingdom as the third instalment to his Private Parts & Pieces album series. After releasing his full studio album 1984 (1981), Phillips entered a collaboration with Argentine musician Enrique Berro Garcia who he first met in 1978.

Antiques was first released in the United Kingdom in 1991 by Virgin Records. In 2012, Voiceprint included the album with Private Parts and Pieces IV: A Catch at the Tables in a 2-CD set containing bonus tracks. In 2015, Esoteric Recordings released a 5-CD box set containing the first four volumes in the Private Parts & Pieces series.

== Background and recording ==
Following the release of 1984 (1981), management at RCA Records was disappointed over its commercial performance. For his next album, Phillips chose to release the third instalment to his Private Parts & Pieces series of generic albums. He had become friends with Argentine musician Enrique Berro Garcia; the two first met in 1978 in a London studio where Garcia was booked for a recording session and Phillips and producer Rupert Hine were mixing Sides (1979). A fan of Phillips, Garcia played "Collections" from Phillips's debut album The Geese & the Ghost (1977) which greatly impressed Phillips. After two years of relatively little activity from both musicians, Garcia recalled that during a tennis match between them they agreed to make an album together. Their original idea was to record a couple of tracks, but they decided to expand their output into a collaborative album using material that Phillips had sketched out and developed it further, plus collaborative ideas "just out of our playing". Phillips recalled the sessions with Garcia as easy and enjoyable, partly due to the fact that Garcia allowed Phillips to take a lead stance on the writing.

Apart from "Hurlingham Suite" and "Old Wives Tale", the material on the album was freshly developed by Phillips and Garcia. The two agreed to keep their ideas simple at first, with trickier arrangements and overdubs recorded later. "Danse Nude" is a section of "Sand Dunes" played backward, and "Otto's Face" is named after a friend of Phillips named Otto. The original title to "Old Wives Tale" was "Little Leaf". Recorded without a dedicated producer, Phillips wondered if the best takes were selected but in the end, thought the process was "pretty easy".

== Release ==
The album was released in March 1982 by Passport Records in the United States. Despite RCA Records showing an initial lack of interest in releasing the album in the United Kingdom, the label put it out in October 1982 following persuasion from Phillips's manager Tony Smith. Antiques would be Phillips's last for RCA before his contract expired.

== Track listing ==
Side one

1. "Motherforest" – 1:55
2. "Hurlingham Suite" - 11:17
  (i) "Ivied Castles" – 4:44
  (ii) "Frosted Windows" – 2:25
  (iii) "Bandido" – 2:46
  (iv) "Church Bells at Sunset" – 1:20
3. "Suite in D Minor" - 6:27
  (i) "Whirlpools"
  (ii) "Cobblestones"
  (iii) "Catacombs"

Side two

1. "Danse Nude" 1:31
2. "Esperansa" – 2:02
3. "Elegy" – 3:28
4. "Otto's Face" – 4:23
5. "Sand Dunes" – 8:24
6. "Old Wives Tale" – 4:46

2012 and 2015 CD reissues bonus tracks

1. "Frosted Windows" (Variation I) - 0:38
2. "Esperanza" (Alternate Mix) - 2:03
3. "Bandido" (Early Take) - 2:58
4. "Old Wives Tale" (Take 6) - 4:41
5. "Suite in D Minor" (Alternate Version) - 6:20
6. "Frosted Windows" (Variation II) - 0:47
7. "El Cid" - 3:08

== Personnel ==
Music

- Anthony Phillips – classical guitar, 6- and 12-string guitar, bass guitar
- Enrique Berro Garcia – bass, guitar, 12-string acoustic guitar, classical guitar

Production

- Anthony Phillips – production, remastering
- Chris David – mixing at Atmosphere Studios, August 1981
- Peter Cross– album sleeve
- "Vic Stench of Thrombosis" – cover photography
- "Pierrot Krods" – photo collage
- Gordon – cutting at Townhouse Studios, London
- Simon Heyworth – remastering
