= Sides (album) =

Studio album by Anthony Phillips
- Released: April 1979
- Recorded: October 1978–January 1979
- Studio: Essex Studios; Matrix Studios; Trident Studios
- Genre: Progressive rock, pop rock
- Length: 46:19
- Label: Arista
- Producer: Rupert Hine

Anthony Phillips chronology
| Private Parts & Pieces (1978) | Sides (1979) | Private Parts & Pieces II: Back to the Pavilion (1980) |

Sides is the fourth studio album by English musician and composer Anthony Phillips. It was released in April 1979 by Arista Records in the United Kingdom and in June 1979 on Passport Records in the United States. After completing Private Parts & Pieces (1978), an album of home recordings that Phillips had recorded years before but remained unreleased, Phillips returned to making a commercial record. The UK release saw the first 5,000 copies of Sides packaged with a Collectors Album edition of Private Parts & Pieces.

== Background and recording ==
Following the release of his second album Wise After the Event in May 1978, Phillips started work on his next record which was to be an album of all fresh material. However, the writing sessions had Phillips in doubt as to whether his re-emergence as a recording artist in 1977 was at the right time, as his progressive style of music was becoming increasingly out of fashion. Phillips also had difficulty in deciding what musical direction to undertake, and saw little value in recording more folk and romantic-oriented music which he had done on his first album The Geese & the Ghost (1977) and Wise After the Event. His label, the US-based Passport Records, put pressure on him to deliver more radio friendly songs.

During the preparation of the album's material, Phillips called upon producer and songwriter Rupert Hine and drummer Michael Giles to assist, both of whom had worked on Wise After the Event. Phillips was soon advised by Passport and his management to include guest vocalists as they deemed his songwriting ability strong enough, but figured other singers would benefit the material in a commercial sense. Phillips was attracted to this idea as he lacked the confidence to handle all the lead vocals himself, and hired singers Dan Owen and Dale Newman, the latter once a member of the Genesis road crew.

Before recording began, Phillips and the group rehearsed for two weeks at Farmyard Studios in Buckinghamshire. They completed some songs there, including "Um & Aargh" which was an easy track for them to put together, and "Nightmare". Recording began in October 1978 at Essex Studios in London. The best takes of each track were transferred to a 24-track master to allow room for overdubs and vocals, and it was decided to mix down the original 16-track recordings for four songs, "Sisters of Remindum", "Bleak House", "Magdalen", and "Nightmare", straight onto the master. Both masters were then synchronised during the mixing stage. Recording then moved to Matrix Studios in London, where engineering duties were overseen by Nick Bradford, and the overdubs were put down at Trident Studios. After completing a rough mix of "Catch You When You Fall", a proposed song for the album, Phillips was unsatisfied with the lyrics and left it off. It was released in instrumental form on Archive Collection Volume I in 1998.

In December 1978, after preparing a master copy, President Records manager Marty Scott suggested that some tracks would benefit from a remix or added instrumentation. A final recording session was booked, whereby Collins played the saxophone on "Side Door" and the track was remixed, and "Um & Aargh" was changed. A final session took place at Pye Studios on 11 January 1979 where Morris Pert added percussion to "Lucy Will" and "Nightmare".

Phillips wanted to name the album Balls in response to one comment that his songs "didn't have 'enough balls'", but was told that the title was "too eccentric", resulting in the change to Sides. This caused a problem with sleeve designer Peter Cross, his fourth cover for Phillips, as he had already completed the design.

== Reception ==
Professional ratings
Review scores
| Source | Rating |
|---|---|
| AllMusic | 3/5 stars |

Paul Stump, in his 1997 History of Progressive Rock, wrote that "the album is disappointing, lacking the sweep and confidence of contemporary pop urges manifesting themselves in the contemporary Genesis of And Then There Were Three."

== Reissues ==
The album was first released on CD in 1990 by Virgin Records. This original CD release contained two extra tracks: "Souvenir" and an instrumental version of "Magdalen".

As part of Voiceprint's re-issuing campaign of Phillips's back catalogue, the album was re-issued in 2010 as an expanded 2 CD edition. The album was re-mastered from the original master tapes by Simon Heyworth and includes the non-album track "Souvenir" as an extra track on the first CD. This is in keeping with the track order of the original CD release. The second CD contains variations and alternate mixes of the songs from the album including some unique new mixes which have been made from the original multi-track masters especially for the release. The instrumental version of "Magdalen", which appeared as bonus track at the end of the original CD issue, has been moved to the second disc of this release. Also included is the edited single version of "Um & Aargh" which has not previously been available on CD. The second CD also contains two tracks originally intended for inclusion on the original album. "Catch You When You Fall" was recorded for the album but was left off because Phillips was unhappy with the lyrics. A rough mix was included on Archive Collection Volume One, the version included on the bonus CD is newly mixed from the 24-track master. "Before The Night" was left off the album in place of "Bleak House" as it was decided to include only one piano-based ballad.

On April 22, 2016, Esoteric Recordings (a Cherry Red Records label) released a 4-disc deluxe edition of the album. Disc 1 contains a 2016 stereo remix of the album. Disc 2 contains the bonus material (as on the 2010 release). Disc 3 contains a remastered version of the original stereo mix of the album. Disc 4 contains a 2016 5.1 surround sound mix of the album on a DVD. The deluxe edition also includes a poster and a 20-page booklet with photos and extensive liner notes.

== Track listing ==
All songs and lyrics by Anthony Phillips except where indicated.

Side one ("First half")
| No. | Title | Writer(s) | Length |
|---|---|---|---|
| 1. | "Um & Aargh" | | 4:50 |
| 2. | "I Want Your Love" | | 3:54 |
| 3. | "Lucy Will" | | 3:23 |
| 4. | "Side Door" | | 3:48 |
| 5. | "Holy Deadlock" | Anthony Phillips, Martin Hall | 4:05 |

Side two ("Second half")
| No. | Title | Length |
|---|---|---|
| 1. | "Sisters of Remindum" | 4:29 |
| 2. | "Bleak House" | 6:13 |
| 3. | "Magdalen" | 7:45 |
| 4. | "Nightmare" | 7:25 |

Sides — 1990 reissue
| No. | Title | Length |
|---|---|---|
| 1. | "Um & Aargh" | 4:51 |
| 2. | "I Want Your Love" | 3:55 |
| 3. | "Lucy Will" | 3:24 |
| 4. | "Side Door" | 3:48 |
| 5. | "Holy Deadlock" | 4:05 |
| 6. | "Souvenir" | 3:45 |
| 7. | "Sisters of Remindum" | 4:29 |
| 8. | "Bleak House" | 6:14 |
| 9. | "Magdalen" | 7:39 |
| 10. | "Nightmare" | 7:24 |
| 11. | "Magdalen" (Instrumental) | 6:51 |

Sides — 2010 and 2016 bonus tracks
| No. | Title | Length |
|---|---|---|
| 1. | "Um & Aargh" (Instrumental Mix) | 6:51 |
| 2. | "I Want Your Love" (Instrumental Mix) | 3:52 |
| 3. | "Sisters of Remindum" (Alternate Mix) | 4:25 |
| 4. | "Lucy Will" (Original Mix) | 4:08 |
| 5. | "Magdalen" (Instrumental Mix) | 7:01 |
| 6. | "Side Door" (Original Mix) | 3:16 |
| 7. | "Um & Aargh" (7" Single Mix) | 3:52 |
| 8. | "Souvenir" (Instrumental Mix) | 3:46 |
| 9. | "Bleak House" (Alternative Mix) | 6:19 |
| 10. | "Magdalen" (Instrumental) | 7:30 |
| 11. | "Catch You When You Fall" (Instrumental Mix) | 3:18 |
| 12. | "Before the Night" (Demo) | 5:05 |

== Personnel ==
Music

- Anthony Phillips (aka "The Vicar" and "Vic Stench") – guitars, keyboards, lead vocals on "Um & Aargh", "Lucy Will", "Holy Deadlock" and "Magdalen", cellos on "Lucy Will", bass on "Bleak House"
- Michael Giles – drums
- John G. Perry – bass guitar
- Dale Newman – lead vocals on "Bleak House" and "Magdalen"
- Dan Owen – lead vocals on "Side Door", "I Want Your Love", "Souvenir" and "Magdalen"
- Ray Cooper – percussion
- Frank Ricotti – timpani
- Morris Pert – monotroch, congas on "Lucy Will"
- Mel Collins – tenor saxophone on "Side Door"
- "Ralph Bernascone" – lead vocals on "Nightmare" (this is a joke credit as the song is instrumental)
- Rupert Hine (aka "Humbert Ruse") – percussion on "Lucy Will", cor anglais on "Sisters of Remindum"

Production

- Rupert Hine – production
- Richard Austin – engineering at Essex Studios
- Andy "Poppadom" Pierce – engineering assistance at Essex Studios
- Nick Bradford – engineering at Matrix Studios
- Jess "Herbie" Sutcliffe – engineering assistance
- Steve Short – mixing at Trident Studios
- Colin Green – mixing
- John Brand – mixing
- Mick Shilton-Poole – equipment
- Peter Cross – artwork
- Robert Ellis – inside cover photography
- Hit & Run Music, Ltd. – management
- Tony Smith – management
