= Private Parts & Pieces VII: Slow Waves, Soft Stars =

Studio album by Anthony Phillips
- Released: August 1987
- Recorded: July 1983–March 1987
- Studio: Englewood Studios, Clapham, London
- Genre: New age; ambient
- Label: Virgin
- Producer: Anthony Phillips

Anthony Phillips chronology
Private Parts and Pieces VI: Ivory Moon (1986)	Private Parts & Pieces VII: Slow Waves, Soft Stars (1987)	Tarka (1988)

Private Parts & Pieces VII: Slow Waves, Soft Stars is the twelfth studio album by English multi-instrumentalist and composer Anthony Phillips. It was released in August 1987 in the United States by Audion Recording as the seventh installment in his Private Parts & Pieces album series. The album sees Phillips explore ambient and new-age music with synthesizers and guitars.

== Background and recording ==
Following the release of his previous album, Private Parts and Pieces VI: Ivory Moon, in 1986, Phillips found himself in a situation where he was "plodding along doing the same kind of things" until a lack of commissions for television music had created a gap of free time. He was unavailable to produce an album of a large scale due to insufficient funds and resources available, but wished for his next release to be "something with a more interesting and wider canvas". Having focused Private Parts & Pieces V: Twelve (1985) on guitar pieces and Ivory Moon on piano pieces, Phillips turned to a synthesiser-based album for Slow Waves, Soft Stars, an early working title for which was Flights of Fancy. Its ambient and New-age style marked a change in musical direction for Phillips, as his previous released focused more on acoustic instruments. He was not influenced by New-age albums at the time. The album contains a mixture of arranged and "adapted improvisations"; Phillips reasoned the latter style down to "the strong atmosphere of these tracks compensates for any deficiencies in the form or development". Phillips noted that his "tradition" of each album in the Private Parts & Pieces series having at least one vocal track had been broken some time before Slow Waves, Soft Stars, and he felt that a song with vocals would not have fit the overall style of this album.

The album was recorded between July 1983 and March 1987 at Englewood Studios, the name of Phillips's home studio in Clapham, south London. Its front cover was photographed by Phillips in Portugal using the wrong exposure, "but that shows that sometimes good things can come out of mistakes". The photo was not his original idea as he wished for it to be the back cover, but when the record label gained enthusiasm over its New-age theme Phillips felt it was necessary to put it on the front. The back cover photo was taken by Tif Hunter using a fisheye lens on a boat trip to France in 1981 for a friend's stag party.

== Music ==
Phillips recorded the five-part "Ice Flight" suite with a Roland Jupiter-8 keyboard loaned to him. He did not write any of the settings down; instead, he searched for sounds he liked and played them. "Beachrunner" and "End of the Affair" feature Argentine musician Enrique Berro Garcia, who Phillips had collaborated with on Private Parts and Pieces III: Antiques (1982) before Garcia returned to Argentina. Garcia arrived in the United Kingdom in early 1986. Both tracks originate from much longer pieces that they had devised during a spontaneous session in April 1986. "Sospirando" originates from a demo that Phillips had assembled in his pitch to score the drama film The Honorary Consul (1983). "Vanishing Streets" and "Slow Waves, Soft Stars" are improvised pieces that were played on a Casio CZ-5000 synthesiser, which Phillips does not rate highly but noted its usefulness for only certain sounds. He was particularly impressed by its ability to create "A constant series of rising and falling envelopes and the characteristics of those pieces was that you got long, sustained notes dipping and before they dip, another one comes in". "The Golden Pathway" originates from the 1986 television film God's Chosen Car Park which Phillips had scored music for in the summer of 1986.

== Release ==
Professional ratings
Review scores
Source	Rating
Allmusic	3/5 stars

The album was released in August 1987 in the United States by Audion Recording. It remained unreleased in the United Kingdom until Virgin Records put it out in 1991. The album was reissued in 1996 and 2010, the latter as a double release with Private Parts & Pieces VIII: New England (1992). In 2016, the album was included in the Private Parts & Pieces V–VIII box set.

== Track listing ==
All titles composed, performed, and produced by Anthony Phillips, except "Beachrunner" and "End of the Affair" composed by Phillips and Enrique Berro Garcia.

No.	Title	Length
1.	"Ice Flight: (i) Flight of the Snow Petrel: Glacier Bay"	5:18
2.	"Ice Flight: (ii) Flight of the Whale-Birds: Blizzard Mountain"	3:39
3.	"Ice Flight: (iii) Flight of the Albatross: Ice Island"	1:26
4.	"Ice Flight: (iv) White Heaven"	3:28
5.	"Ice Flight: (v) Cathedral of Ice"	2:16
6.	"Beachrunner"	2:50
7.	"End of the Affair"	2:45
8.	"The Golden Pathway"	1:39
9.	"Behind the Waterfall"	3:24
10.	"Carnival"	1:33
11.	"Through the Black Hole"	3:15
12.	"Pluto Garden"	2:06
13.	"Sospirando"	2:57
14.	"Elevenses"	3:10
15.	"Goodbye Serenade"	2:29
16.	"Bubble and Squeak"	0:59
17.	"Vanishing Streets"	4:19
18.	"Slow Waves, Soft Stars"	6:12

On the CD version of the album, tracks 1–5 are combined into one track, as are tracks 11–12 and tracks 17–18.

== Personnel ==
Credits taken from the album's 1987 liner notes.

Music

- Anthony Phillips – Roland Jupiter-8, Casio CZ-5000, ARP 2600, Polymoog, Yari classical guitar, Rudloff 8-string guitar, Alvarez 12-string guitar on "Goodbye Serenade", Tom drum machine, Tibetan bells and chimes, zither on "Behind the Waterfall"
- Enrique Berro Garcia – classical guitar on "Beachrunner" and "End of the Affair"

Production

- Anthony Phillips (aka "Vic Stench of Thrombosis") – production, back cover photography
- Paul Graves – technical supervision
- John Lee – inspiration
- Tif Hunter – front cover photo
- Murray Brenman – design
