= Private Parts and Pieces VI: Ivory Moon =

Studio album by Anthony Phillips
- Released: January 1986
- Recorded: August 1985
- Studio: Englewood Studios, Clapham, London
- Genre: Contemporary classical
- Length: 59:49
- Label: Passport Records (US); Virgin Records (UK)
- Producer: Anthony Phillips

Anthony Phillips chronology
| Private Parts & Pieces V: Twelve (1985) | Private Parts and Pieces VI: Ivory Moon (1986) | Private Parts & Pieces VII: Slow Waves, Soft Stars (1987) |

Private Parts and Pieces VI: Ivory Moon is the eleventh studio album by English multi-instrumentalist and composer Anthony Phillips. It was released in January 1986 by Passport Records in the United States and Canada as the sixth instalment in his Private Parts & Pieces album series. Ivory Moon consists entirely of piano pieces written between 1971 and 1985, with all tracks recorded in August 1985. It is Phillips's first album not to feature him as a guitarist.

== Background and recording ==
After finalising his previous album, Private Parts & Pieces V: Twelve, Phillips decided to continue with his Private Parts & Pieces album series and prepare material for the sixth instalment. He had several ideas for the direction that the album was to take, but the lack of a recording deal with a UK label with limited money to fund a larger-scale project, limited his options. Phillips then decided to assemble a group of solo piano compositions that he had written between 1971 and 1985, which marked a change in direction for Phillips, as each of his previous albums had featured his guitar work. Phillips was inspired to write "Sunrise over Sienna" from the works of Italian composer Ottorino Respighi, of whom he was a fan of. "Winter's Thaw" and "The Old House" include the earliest dated compositions on the album, parts on both were written in 1971 shortly after Phillips had started formal piano lessons. Early versions of both tracks were recorded and put together with other demos in the summer of 1972. "The Old House" was formed of many sections that Phillips had come up with that were pieced together to form a complete track. "Tara's Theme" and "Moonfall" are piano versions of songs originally put together for a planned musical adaptation of the picture book Masquerade (1979) by Kit Williams. Though the musical never came into fruition, Phillips felt they were worthy for inclusion. The former was originally titled "Riddles". "Winter's Thaw" was inspired by how cold it would get in Phillips's room at his parents’ house, resulting in him becoming ill with chilblains and resorting to wear mittens to play the piano comfortably.

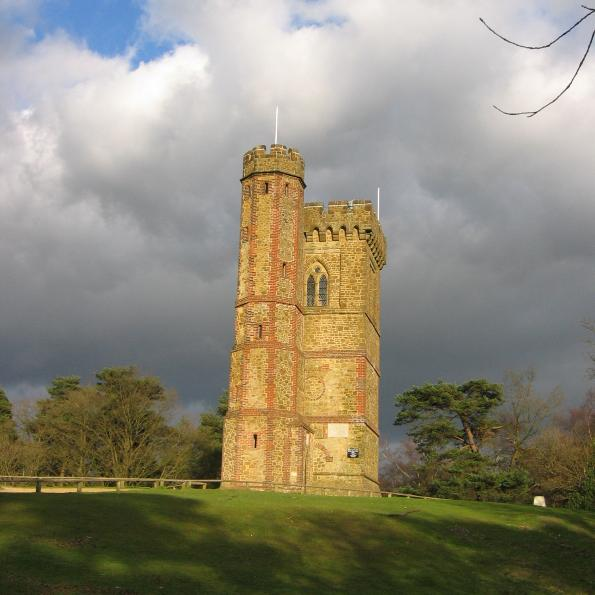
Leith Hill Tower

The album's cover painting is a work entitled Sea-Dogs Motoring by Peter Cross, who had designed the sleeves for many of Phillips's previous albums. The painting is based on Leith Hill Tower in Dorking. The back cover features a photograph of Phillips taken by Cross in 1985 during a cricket game at Hambledon, Hampshire. As per most of Phillips albums, the liner notes to Ivory Moon contain a running joke reference to Phillips's friend Ralph Bernascone: "Ralph Bernascone appears courtesy of Ravaged Records". The photography is credited to "Pierror Krols and Vic Stench of Thrombosis", the latter name being another running joke as it is in fact one of Phillips's pseudonyms.

== Release ==
Professional ratings
Review scores
| Source | Rating |
|---|---|
| Allmusic | 2.5/5 stars |

The album was released in the United States and Canada by Passport Records in January 1986. Ivory Moon was reissued on CD by Virgin Records in 1991, and by Blueprint Records in 1996. These reissues include a new recording done in October 1990, based on Phillips' original September 1968 piano version of the Genesis song "Let Us Now Make Love". Genesis performed the song for the BBC radio show Night Ride in February 1970.

On 23 September 2016 Esoteric Recordings released a 5-CD box set containing the second four volumes in the Private Parts & Pieces series and a fifth disc of previously unreleased material.

== Track listing ==
All titled composed, performed, and produced by Anthony Phillips, except where noted.

Side one
| No. | Title | Length |
|---|---|---|
| 1. | "Suite: Sea-Dogs Motoring – (i) Sunrise Over Sienna" | 3:21 |
| 2. | "Suite: Sea-Dogs Motoring – (ii) Basking Shark" | 5:09 |
| 3. | "Suite: Sea-Dogs Motoring – (iii) Sea-Dog's Air" | 2:37 |
| 4. | "Suite: Sea-Dogs Motoring – (iv) Safe Havens" | 1:15 |
| 5. | "Tara's Theme (From Masquerade)" | 3:22 |
| 6. | "Winter's Thaw" | 9:35 |

Side two
| No. | Title | Writer(s) | Length |
|---|---|---|---|
| 1. | "The Old House" | | 15:17 |
| 2. | "Moonfall (From Masquerade)" | Phillips, Rupert Hine | 4:00 |
| 3. | "Rapids" | | 8:25 |

Private Parts and Pieces VI: Ivory Moon — 1991 CD bonus track
| No. | Title | Length |
|---|---|---|
| 10. | "Let Us Now Make Love" | 6:31 |

== Personnel ==
Taken from the 1986 LP liner notes.

Music

- Anthony Phillips – piano, production

Production

- Paul Graves – maintenance
- John Armer – piano tuning
- "Pierror Krols" and "Vic Stench of Thrombosis" – photography
- Ian Cooper – disc cutting at Townhouse Studios, London
- Kim Cross – album title
- Peter Cross – cover painting ("Sea-Dogs Motoring")
