= Slow dance (disambiguation) =

A slow dance is a type of partner dance in which a couple dance slowly.

Slow Dance or Slow Dancing may also refer to:

== Albums ==
- Slow Dance (Anthony Phillips album), 1990
- Slow Dance (Jeremy Jay album), 2009
- Slow Dance (Southside Johnny album), 1988
- Slow Dancing (EP), a 2014 EP by Betty Who
- Slow Dance, a 2002 album by Ken Navarro
- Slow Dance, a 2019 EP by AJ Mitchell
- Slow Dancing, a 1997 album by Tommy Tune

== Songs ==
- "Slow Dance" (song), a 2009 song by Keri Hilson
- "Slow Dance" (Hey Mr. DJ), a 1992 song by R. Kelly and Public Announcement
- "Slow Dancing" (Aly & AJ song), 2020
- "Slow Dancing" (Lindsey Buckingham song), 1984
- Slow Dancing (V song), 2023
- "Swayin' to the Music (Slow Dancing), first released in 1976 as "Slow Dancing"
- "Slow Dance", a song from the 1946 album Frank Sinatra Conducts the Music of Alec Wilder
- "Slow Dance", a song by Carpenters from the 1989 album Lovelines
- "Slow Dance", a song by Laurence Juber from the 1990 album Solo Flight
- "Slow Dance", a song by Michael Peterson from the 1999 album Being Human
- "Slow Dance", a song by Motörhead from the 2000 album We Are Motörhead
- "Slow Dance", a song by Chris Rea from the 2002 album Dancing Down the Stony Road
- "Slow Dance", a song by Senses Fail from the 2004 album Let It Enfold You
- "Slow Dance", a song by Bring Me the Horizon from the 2006 album Count Your Blessings
- "Slow Dance", a song from the 2007 album The Moment
- "Slow Dance", a song by Starfucker from the 2011 album Reptilians
- "Slow Dance", a song by Kelly Clarkson from the 2017 album Meaning of Life
- "Slow Dance", a 2019 song by AJ Mitchell and Ava Max from Mitchell's EP of the same name
- "Slow Dance", a song by Clairo from the 2024 album Charm
- "Slow Dancing", a song by Bono from the 1993 album Stay (Faraway, So Close!)
- "Slow Dancing", a song by Lucero from the 2002 album Tennessee
- "Slow Dancing in a Burning Room", a song by John Mayer from the 2006 album Continuum.
- "Slow Dancing in the Dark", song by Joji from the 2018 album Ballads 1.

== Other ==
- Slow Dancing in the Big City, 1978 film
- Slow Dance, a 2024 adult novel by Rainbow Rowell
