= Wise After the Event =

Studio album by Anthony Phillips
- Released: May 1978
- Recorded: October–December 1977
- Studio: Essex Studios (London, England); The Manor Mobile at The Farmyard (Buckinghamshire, England); CBS Studios (London, England)
- Genre: Progressive rock
- Length: 55:27
- Label: Arista
- Producer: Rupert Hine

Anthony Phillips chronology
The Geese & the Ghost (1977)	Wise After the Event (1978)	Private Parts & Pieces (1978)

Wise After the Event is the second studio album by English musician and composer Anthony Phillips, released in May 1978 on Arista Records in the United Kingdom and in June 1978 on Passport Records in the United States. After promoting his previous album The Geese & the Ghost (1977), Phillips began to prepare material for a new album. It remains his only album that features himself on lead vocals on each track.

== Production ==
In March 1977, Phillips released his debut solo album, The Geese & the Ghost. Around the time it was put out, Phillips did consider furthering his education and return to music college but the album "did enough" for him to continue with making albums. Phillips recalled that the rise in punk rock in England at the time of The Geese & the Ghost increased the pressure for him to write more commercial songs and deliver hit singles. He had started an instrumental album based on Tarka the Otter, but the project was put on hold due to his difficulty in securing a recording deal. Within such a climate, Phillips found himself "forced" to make a new studio album of "mainstream pop songs" which he never felt completely comfortable doing, and lacked enough confidence in the material he had written by himself. He began with putting ideas down at his home studio using a TEAC 4-track tape machine and a 2-track Revox recorder.

After preparing a collection of ideas Phillips presented them to producer Rupert Hine and session musicians Michael Giles on drums and John G. Perry on bass, the three rehearsed them for one week at Giles's home studio in Dorset, and recorded the developed tracks onto 4-track tape. After Phillips secured a deal with Arista Records, the original plan was for Wise After the Event to be released as an album with an accompanying EP of extra material. Artist Peter Cross began to design the cover art when the decision was made, but when the decision was made to scrap the EP Cross had moved onto other projects and there was insufficient time to correct his design, resulting in discrepancies with the running order of the tracks. This was corrected on the 1990 CD reissue.

The unreleased music was released in 1980 on Private Parts & Pieces II: Back to the Pavilion, the second in his series of "generic" albums that showcase ideas, demos, and outtakes of recordings. These included three short sections of tracks that were planned and sequenced for the earlier album: "Chinaman" is based on the introduction to "Paperchase"; "Romany's Aria" is a piece from "We're All as We Lie" played backwards; "Von Runkel's Yorker Music" was previously titled "Sitars and Nebulous" and included on the B-side of "We're All As We Lie" along with "Squirrel." Back to the Pavilion includes two additional songs, "Tremulous" and "Magic Garden", that date from the Wise After the Event sessions.

== Recording ==
Wise After the Event was recorded from October to December 1977. The first sessions took place across two weeks in October at Essex Studios in London, using a 16-track machine with added Dolby noise reduction. These were followed by sessions in November and December with the Manor Mobile studio and The Farmyard, a facility in Buckinghamshire. Here, the final takes of the backing tracks were recorded and transferred onto 24-track for the recording of the overdubs. The final sessions took place in December 1977 at CBS Studios in London. After recording finished, the album was mixed in December 1977 and January 1978 at Trident Studios in London. Minor overdubs were recorded at the studio, including the guitar solo on "Birdsong". The orchestra session for "Regrets" took place on 6 December 1977, and recorded onto 24-track.

"Wise After the Event" features Phillips playing a 12-string Rickenbacker guitar that he purchased at Manny's Music in New York City. For the guitar effects he used a BOSS Chorus Ensemble pedal and a Dyna Comp compressor for chord-based arrangements. He said it took some effort for Giles to "let himself go" on the drums as he was used to playing in a tight and precise style, and Phillips wanted more of his fast drum fills. Phillips caused problems during the recording as he found himself gradually speeding up as he played. Giles advised him to practise at home for a weekend and play to a metronome to improve his timing.

== Release and reception ==
Professional ratings
Review scores
Source	Rating
AllMusic	4/5 stars

Wise After the Event was released in May 1978 on Arista Records in the United Kingdom and in June 1978 on Passport Records in the United States. "We're All as We Lie" was released as a single with "Squirrel" and "Sitars and Nebulous" coupled on the B-side. "Squirrel" was later reunited with the album as a bonus track on the 1990 reissue.

The British magazine Hi-Fi News & Record Review wrote: "Soft strums, songs and keyboard waves typify" the album which has "a mild Mike Oldfield touch to it" which "augurs well for its chances". One reviewer for Beat magazine in 1979 put the record on as it was "the perfect soother of frazzled nerves". Rob Patterson for The Bismarck Tribune gave a short positive review, noting the album is "a soft, subtle, but very tasteful slice of that-now-famous [Genesis] sound", and concludes with: "A heartening return". Chris Carson for the Press & Sun-Bulletin thought the album was not as successful as The Geese & the Ghost where Phillips "had the right idea" to play the instruments himself and leave the vocals to others. Carson compared the album's sound to early Genesis when Phillips was a member, but disliked his singing which failed to reach the quality of the album's production guitar work. "The result is a very tedious album, and a real struggle for even the devout Genesis fan to get through". Jane Seigendall for The Morning Call opened her review that the album is "an extraordinary example of music that's hard to just listen to", and requires the listener to "enter it" to appreciate the "haunting" music with his "erudite and often surrealistic" words that she found difficult to understand. She recognises his classical influences which is simultaneously "futuristic and ageless" and cites "We're All as We Lie" as the best example of his unconventional style, and suggested the album will appeal to esoteric music fans. She ended by praising Cross's artwork. The Times of Munster, Indiana rated the album as one of the best progressive rock albums of 1978 and is "most worthy of your listening time". It praised the contributions of Giles and Collins, and concludes: "The album simply shimmers with Phillips's delicate tunes". In a retrospective review, AllMusic's Dave Thompson recognised that the album was made during "an invigorating period" for Phillips and noted his increased confidence "oozes out of every groove". Thompson rated Wise After the Event as more cohesive than The Geese & the Ghost but lacks the experimental nature of its predecessor and considered it to have too many ballads and "samey" music. He praises "We're All as We Lie" and the "multi-textured" title track as "career-enhancing classics".

== Reissues ==
In 1990, Wise After the Event was released on CD by Virgin Records, with "Squirrel" as a bonus track. This was followed by a 2-CD remastered edition released in July 2007 in Japan by Arcangelo Records with a limited edition mini-vinyl sleeve. Included is "Squirrel" and a disc of 14 previously unreleased tracks of demos and out-takes. A standard CD jewel case version was released in the UK by Voiceprint Records in May 2008.

In February 2016, Esoteric Recordings released a 4-disc Deluxe Edition of the album with a new stereo mix completed in 2016, a second CD containing the same bonus material as the 2008 Voiceprint release, and a third CD with a remastered version of the original stereo mix. The fourth disc is a DVD containing a new 5.1 surround sound. All mixes were completed using the original multi-track master tapes. Also included is a poster and a 20-page booklet with photos and extensive liner notes. Phillips did consider going back to the original concept and present it with an accompanying EP and with the originally planned track order, but decided against it as people had got used to how the album was released.

== Track listing ==
All songs written by Anthony Phillips, except where indicated.

Side one
No.	Title	Length
1.	"We're All as We Lie"	4:37
2.	"Birdsong"	6:45
3.	"Moonshooter"	5:58
4.	"Wise After the Event"	10:28 (Note: The last part (about 1:45) of this track is a hidden track: an instrumental, "Hunt Link," which is a preview of the album's closing track "Now What (Are They Doing to My Little Friends?)." This was banded as a separate track on the original vinyl.)

Side two
No.	Title	Writer(s)	Length
1.	"Pulling Faces"		4:37
2.	"Regrets"		6:02
3.	"Greenhouse"	Phillips, Jeremy Gilbert	3:03
4.	"Paperchase"		5:34
5.	"Now What (Are They Doing to My Little Friends?)"		8:23

1990 and 2008 CD bonus track
No.	Title	Length
10.	"Squirrel"	4:30

2008 and 2016 CD bonus tracks – Demos, Out-Takes and Extras
No.	Title	Writer(s)	Length
1.	"We're All as We Lie (Link)"		1:23
2.	"Sleeping on an Interstellar Plane" ("Greenhouse" Demo)	Phillips, Gilbert	3:04
3.	"Paperchase" (Instrumental Demo)		5:31
4.	"Birdsong" (Instrumental Demo)		5:33
5.	"Moonshooter" (Cottage Tapes Demo)		5:37
6.	"We're All as We Lie" (Cottage Tapes Demo)		3:53
7.	"Pulling Faces" (Cottage Tapes Demo)		4:29
8.	"Squirrel" (Instrumental Mix)		4:28
9.	"Wise After the Event" (Instrumental Mix)		8:54
10.	"Magic Garden" (Solo Piano Mix)		1:55
11.	"We're All as We Lie" (7" Single Version)		3:49
12.	"Regrets" (Piano Mix)		6:00
13.	"Chinaman" (Basic Guitar Mix)		0:44
14.	"Now What (Are They Doing to My Little Friends?)" (Instrumental Mix)		8:14

== Personnel ==
Credits adapted from the album's 1978 and 2015 liner notes.

Music

- Anthony Phillips (aka "The Vicar", "Vic Stench") – vocals, harmonia, guitars, keyboards, sundries, drums and bass on "Greenhouse", orchestral arrangements on "Regrets"
- Michael Giles – drums
- John G. Perry – Wal custom bass guitar
- Jeremy Gilbert – keyboards on "Greenhouse", harp on "Now What? (Are They Doing to My Little Friends?)"
- Mel Collins – soprano saxophone on "We're All as We Lie", flute on "Birdsong"
- Robin Phillips – oboe on "Sitars & Nebulous"
- Rupert Hine (aka "Humbert Ruse") – percussion, backing vocals, locks, probs, modes, vibraphone, drums and bass on "Greenhouse"
- Alan Perkins (aka "Perkin Alanbeck") – synthesiser on "Birdsong"
- Rodent Rabble – clicks, claps and crampons (including "No Hours from Neasden")
- Gilbert Biberian – orchestra conductor on "Regrets"
- David Katz – orchestra assembling

Production

- Rupert Hine – producer
- Richard "Papercup" Austen – engineer at Essex Studios
- Alan Perkins – engineer at Manor Mobile and Twowood Studios
- Steve Taylor – engineer at CBS Studios
- George Marino – mastering at Sterling Sound
- Ray Staff – mastering at Trident Studios
- Peter Kelsey – mixing
- Simon Heyworth – remastering
- Peter Cross – artwork
