= Tregenna Castle =

Country house in St. Ives, Cornwall, England

- Kastel Tregenow (Cornish)
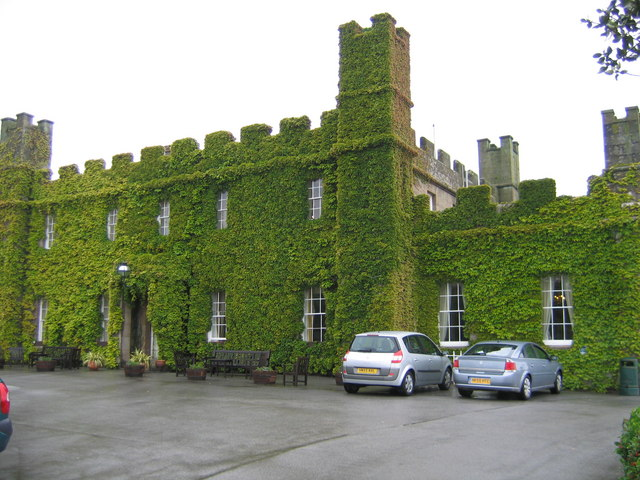

- Location within Cornwall
- 50.20446°N 5.47785°W
- Location: St Ives, Cornwall, England

History
- Built: 1774

Site notes
- Architect: probably John Wood the Younger

Listed Building – Grade II
- Official name: Tregenna Castle Hotel
- Designated: 4 June 1952
- Reference no.: 1327765

Tregenna Castle (Cornish: Kastel Tregenow, meaning "Kenow’s settlement")) in St Ives, Cornwall, was built by John Stephens in the 18th century and is named after the hill on which it stands. The estate was sold in 1871 and became a hotel, a purpose for which it is still used today.

The castle is a Grade II Listed building. It is surrounded by 72 acres (29 ha) of gardens and natural woodland, and has views along the coastline of Cornwall.

== History ==
Tregenna Castle was commissioned in 1774 by John Stephens. The architect was probably John Wood, the Younger. The building was extended in the 19th century. The estate was put up for sale by auction on 31 October 1871. The castle – "an imposing castellated edifice, very substantially built of granite" – at the time included three pairs of bedrooms on the upper floor and another bedroom on the ground floor; a school room; billiard room; WCs; and servants' quarters in the basement. The sale included the "park, lodge, glen, pasture grounds, gardens, woods, plantations, and lands in hand 90 Acres, 1 Rood, 20 Perches." The estate was bought by the Bolitho family.

The name Tregenna is first recorded as Treghenou in 1301, from the Cornish tre (farm or settlement), with a Celtic personal name Kenow, meaning pup or cub.

=== Railway hotel ===
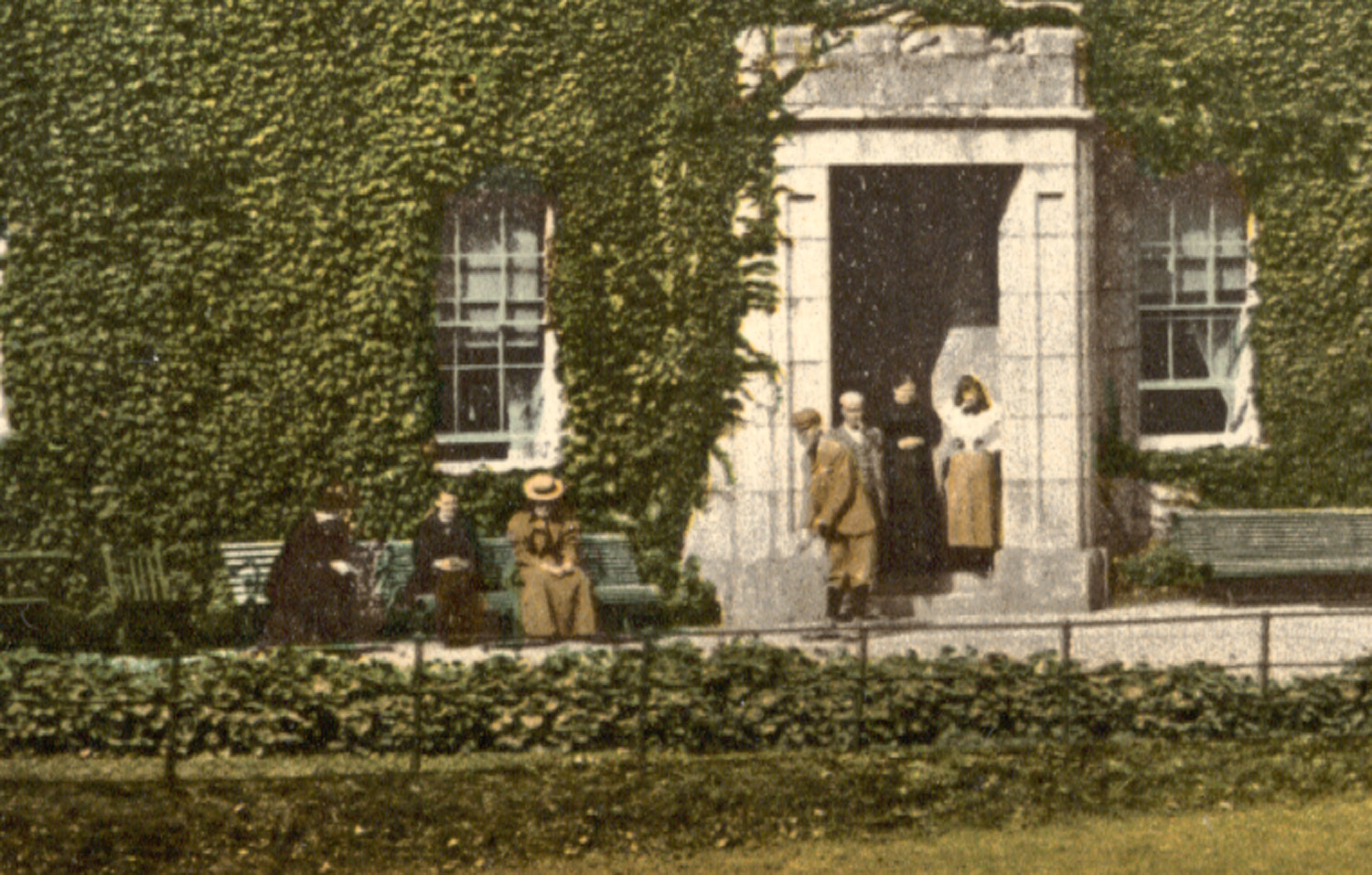
Tregenna Castle Hotel in about 1890. (Photochrom print)

The Great Western Railway (GWR) opened its St Ives branch line on 1 June 1877 and it leased the Tregenna Castle as a hotel the following year, opening it on 5 August 1878. Early railway hotels had only been situated near large terminals or junctions, but this one was the first intended by the GWR as a holiday destination in its own right.

Sir Daniel Gooch, the chairman of the GWR, stayed at the hotel a few weeks after it opened to the public. He recorded in his diary that

"the situation of this house is very fine; it is a castle within its own grounds of about 70 acres (28 ha), a great part of which are gardens and woods with pretty shaded walks ... The house feels more like a private house than a hotel; the views from it are very fine, looking over the town and bay of St Ives and along the coast as far as Trevose Head."

The GWR purchased the hotel outright in 1895.

One of the GWR's buses, a 1.5 ton Milnes-Daimler type, was stationed at the hotel from 1913 to convey residents to the golf links at Lelant but the service was suspended in 1916 due to fuel shortages during World War I. It was replaced in 1922 by a new bus on a Burford chassis. This operated for seven years until the arrival of a new Thornycroft bus with a Duple body in 1929.

The Great Western Railway named two of its express locomotives after the hotel:

- Duke Class number 3280 carried the name "Tregenna" from 1897 to 1930.
- Castle Class number 5006 was given the name "Tregenna Castle" in 1927.

=== Subsequently ===
The GWR was nationalised to become the Western Region of British Railways on 1 January 1948. Railway hotels throughout the United Kingdom eventually became the British Transport Hotels division but they were all privatised during the 1980s. The hotel and grounds are currently managed by the Tregenna Castle Estate.

The castle hosted President Joe Biden and his entourage during the G7 meeting of advanced economies at the Carbis Bay Hotel in June 2021.

== References in popular culture ==
The English guitarist and composer Anthony Phillips was a frequent visitor to St Ives with his family in the late 1960s and early 1970s, and in 1972 composed a guitar duet entitled Tregenna Afternoons. Phillips recorded the piece in 1976, and it was released on his 1979 album Private Parts and Pieces.
