= Intergalactic Touring Band =

Music concept album

Intergalactic Touring Band Album Cover

The Intergalactic Touring Band (IGTB) was not an actual music group but rather a science fiction pop music concept album released in 1977 by the now defunct Passport Records in America and Charisma Records in England. The ensemble album featured many star performers from progressive rock and other genres, including Meat Loaf, Ben E. King, Larry Fast (Synergy), Percy Jones, Annie Haslam, Rod Argent, Marge Raymond, Peppi Marchello (Good Rats), and many others. The songs are loosely held together by an epic theme of multi-generational space travel and human space colonization.

== Fictional band members ==
- Hope Larson — Lase Keyboard Panel
- Ixol Phaane — Computerized Keyboard Synthesis
- Justice Conrad — Globe Lase Base
- Krys — Holographic Percussion
- Raif Reed — Lase Guitar

== List of tracks ==
- "Approach (Overture)"
- "Silver Lady"
- "Universal Zoo/Why"
- "Starship Jingle"
- "Heartbreaker"
- "Reaching Out"
- "First Landing"
- "Space Commando"
- "Robot Salesman"
- "Love Station"
- "A Planet Called Monday/Epilogue"
- "Keeper Keep Us"

== List of performers ==
- Rod Argent: Lead vocal on "Silver Lady"
- Marge Raymond: Lead Vocal as the “Silver Lady”
- Steve Barth: Lead vocal on "First Landing"
- Danny Beckerman: Orchestral arrangement on "Universal Zoo/Why", "First Landing" and "A Planet Called Monday/Epilogue"
- David Bedford: Orchestral arrangement on "Heartbreaker", "Space Commando" and "Love Station"
- Arthur Brown: Lead vocal, "Universal Zoo"
- Ryche Chlanda: Electric guitar on "Robot Salesman"
- Clarence Clemons: Saxophone solo on "Love Station"
- Irene Conrad: Effect vocal on "Silver Lady"
- Dave Cousins: Lead vocal on "Heartbreaker"
- Brian Cuomo: Keyboards on "Silver Lady", "Universal Zoo/Why", "Starship Jingle", "Heartbreaker", "First Landing", "Space Commando", "Love Station", "A Planet Called Monday/Epilogue" and "Keeper Keep Us"; Orchestral arrangement on "Robot Salesman" and "Love Station"
- Jim Cuomo: Lead vocal on "Robot Salesman"
- Frank D'Agostino: Group vocals on "Silver Lady", "Universal Zoo/Why", "Starship Jingle", "Heartbreaker", "First Landing", "Space Commando", "A Planet Called Monday/Epilogue" and "Keeper Keep Us"
- Larry Fast: Synthesizers on "Approach (Overture)", "Silver Lady", "Universal Zoo/Why", "Starship Jingle", "Heartbreaker", "First Landing", "Space Commando", "Robot Salesman", "Love Station", "A Planet Called Monday/Epilogue", "Keeper Keep Us"; Mellotron on "Approach (Overture)", "Silver Lady", "Robot Salesman"; vocoder on "Silver Lady", "Universal Zoo/Why", "Robot Salesman"; prepared effects on "Starship Jingle"
- Stephan Galfas: Orchestral arrangement on "Silver Lady", "Starship Jingle", "Heartbreaker", "Space Commando", "Robot Salesman", "Love Station"
- Bill Guerra: Additional vocals on "Universal Zoo/Why"
- Annie Haslam: Lead vocal on "Reaching Out"
- Mighty Young Joe Intile, B. E.: Tympani on "Reaching Out"; Additional percussion on "First Landing"
- Percy Jones: Fretless Bass on "Why" and "Keeper Keep Us"
- Ben E. King: Lead vocal on "Love Station"
- Joel Krantz: Lead vocal on "Why"; group vocals on "Silver Lady", "Universal Zoo/Why", "Starship Jingle", "Heartbreaker", "First Landing", "Space Commando", "A Planet Called Monday/Epilogue", "Keeper Keep Us"
- Jeffrey Leynor: Lead vocal, "Epilogue"
- Meat Loaf: Lead vocal on "Keeper Keep Us"
- Wil Malone: orchestral arrangement on "Approach (Overture)", "Silver Lady", "Starship Jingle", "Reaching Out", "First Landing", "Keeper Keep Us"
- Peppi Marchello (misspelled Pepe in album credits): Lead vocal on "Starship Jingle"
- Paul Marchetti: Drums and percussion on "Silver Lady", "Universal Zoo/Why", "Starship Jingle", "Heartbreaker", "Reaching Out", "First Landing", "Space Commando", "Robot Salesman", "Love Station", "A Planet Called Monday/Epilogue", "Keeper Keep Us"; Primitive percussion on "Universal Zoo/Why"
- The Passport Munchkins: Additional vocals on "First Landing"
- Rick Parfitt: Lead vocal, "A Planet Called Monday"
- Janice Pendarvis and Friends: Background vocals on "Love Station"
- Anthony Phillips: Acoustic guitars on "Reaching Out"
- Frank Prescod: Bass guitar on "First Landing", "Robot Salesman", "Love Station"
- Marge Raymond: Silver Lady vocal on "Silver Lady"
- Francis Rossi: Lead vocal, "A Planet Called Monday"
- David Scance: acoustic guitar on "Silver Lady", "Starship Jingle", "Heartbreaker", "First Landing", "Space Commando", "Robot Salesman"; electric guitar on "Silver Lady", "Universal Zoo/Why", "Starship Jingle", "Heartbreaker", "First Landing", "Space Commando", "Robot Salesman", "A Planet Called Monday/Epilogue", "Keeper Keep Us"; group vocals on "Silver Lady" and "A Planet Called Monday/Epilogue"
- Marty Scott: Group vocals on "Silver Lady"; Primitive percussion and additional vocals on "Universal Zoo/Why"; Electric Autoharp on "Starship Jingle"; Prepared effects on "Starship Jingle"; Additional percussion on "Space Commando"
- Mr. Snips: Lead vocal on "Space Commando"
- Peter Sobel: Fender bass on "Silver Lady", "Universal Zoo/Why", "Starship Jingle"; Group vocals on "Silver Lady"; Primitive percussion on "Universal Zoo/Why"; Additional vocals on "Universal Zoo/Why"; Prepared effects on "Starship Jingle"; Bass guitar on "Heartbreaker", "First Landing", "Space Commando" "A Planet Called Monday/Epilogue", "Keeper Keep Us"; Acoustic guitars on "Reaching Out", "Robot Salesman", "Keeper Keep Us"; Additional percussion on "Love Station"
- Shelley Thompson: Group vocals on "Silver Lady", "Universal Zoo/Why", "Starship Jingle", "Heartbreaker", "First Landing", "Space Commando", "A Planet Called Monday/Epilogue", "Keeper Keep Us"
- John Tropea: Electric guitars on "Love Station"; Guitar solo on "Love Station"
- John Zangrando: Flutes on "Starship Jingle" and "Heartbreaker"
- "The Boss": Effects vocal on "Universal Zoo/Why"
- Members of the London Symphony Orchestra, conducted by Harry Rabinowitz, on "Approach (Overture)" and "Reaching Out"

== Discography ==
- Intergalactic Touring Band — Intergalactic Touring Band — Passport Records (U.S.) — 1977
- Vibra Corporation (a.k.a. Intergalactic Touring Band) — "Snow White Rock Christmas" b/w "I Wish It Could Be Christmas Every Day" — Passport PSC 7910 (U.S.) — 1977

Promotional-only 12" disc released during the holiday season.
