= Field Day (Anthony Phillips album) =

Studio album by Anthony Phillips
- Released: 17 October 2005
- Recorded: 2004–2005
- Studios: Vic's Place, London
- Genre: Acoustic
- Labels: Blueprint (BP362CD)
- Producer: Anthony Phillips

Anthony Phillips chronology
Archive Collection Volume II (2004)	Field Day (2005)	Wildlife (2008)

Professional ratings
Review scores
Source	Rating
Allmusic	3.5/5 stars

Field Day is a studio double album by English multi-instrumentalist and composer Anthony Phillips, released in October 2005 by Blueprint Records.

== Background ==
The project was conceived in September 2001, when Phillips decided to start on a proposed "quickie" instrumental guitar album. This would be his first guitar album since Private Parts & Pieces V: Twelve released in 1985, and until the early 2000s, his albums contained little fresh material. By this time in his career, Phillips had considered himself "a stranger to the world of guitars", and upon entering a break in producing keyboard-based television music, thought it was the right time to practise his guitar playing. Phillips took each acoustic guitar he had and practised for two or three hours each day, "in a state of great excitement but chronic rustiness". After three weeks, he went through recordings of what he had played and selected the strongest sections to arrange into a complete composition for recording. By early December 2001, he had enough material to work with, and his pieces featured not only a 6-, 10-, and 12-string guitar, but the cittern, English and Greek bouzouki, charango, and mandolin. However, various problems arose which affected the album's progression, including Phillips becoming out of practise to perform the pieces correctly, the insufficient time to practise, and spending time on incoming library music work.

In December 2003, Phillips had made two attempts to record the tracks onto tape, but each time he decided to pause and dedicate more time to practise his guitar playing. At this point, he considered releasing Field Day as part of his Private Parts & Pieces series of albums compiled of more generic music than a fully fledged release. He described the album's undertaking as "a mushrooming project that will never be finished". At one point, Phillips considered the idea of releasing the music on Field Day across two separate albums to break it up, but became aware of the possibility of one containing most of the strongest material than the other, resulting in an unbalanced set. Philips also wished to re-record "Nocturne", a guitar piece from Private Parts & Pieces II: Back to the Pavilion (1980) because "after thirty years [I] can't play it properly". Phillips expressed an interest in having some tracks become guitar duets with another guitarist, suggesting it to Argentinian guitarist Enrique Berro Garcia, who he had worked with on his past albums. He decided against this over his belief that a solo guitar track after a duet may have sounded more "empty" in comparison, but had an orchestra play strings on some tracks following encouragement from Andrew Skeet. The two would make an orchestral album named Seventh Heaven, in 2012.

Phillips put the album on hold until 2004, when he had enough time to resume working on it.

The sleeve cover is designed by GR/DD, based in London.

== Release ==
On 26 October 2018, Field Day was reissued as a 2 CD/1 DVD Deluxe Edition digipack by Esoteric Recordings which contains a remastered original mix and a new 5.1 surround sound mix (assisted by engineer James Collins). This 3-disc digipack edition includes a booklet with a new essay by Jonathan Dann and comments from Anthony Phillips.

== Track listing ==
=== Disc one ===
1. "The Voyage Out"
2. "High Fives"
3. "Credo"
4. "Cerise"
5. "Runaway Horses"
6. "Home Sweet Home"
7. "Steps Retraced" (based on "Traces" from Invisible Men)
8. "Field Day"
9. "Nocturne" (re-recording of song from Private Parts & Pieces II: Back to the Pavilion)
10. "Tryst"
11. "Girl in the Gallery"
12. "Bel Ami"
13. "Concerto de Alvarez"
14. "Lifer"
15. "Chasing the Light"
16. "Parlour Suite I"
17. "Parlour Suite II"
18. "Parlour Suite III"
19. "Parlour Suite IV"
20. "Parlour Suite V"
21. "Parlour Suite VI"
22. "Parlour Suite VII"
23. "Parlour Suite VIII"
24. "Swoon"
25. "River of Life"
26. "Momento"
27. "Open Road"
28. "White Spider"
29. "Half Way Out"

=== Disc two ===
1. "Weeping Willow"
2. "The Love Not Shared"
3. "Sojourn"
4. "Dawn over the Field of Eternity"
5. "Fallen City"
6. "Rain on Sag Harbour"
7. "Days of Grace"
8. "Timeline"
9. "Oubliette"
10. "Tania"
11. "Babbling Brook"
12. "Shimmering Sharon"
13. "Tea Room in Terra del Fuego"
14. "Mudlark"
15. "Tearaway"
16. "Midnight Blue"
17. "Evening Shroud"
18. "Rapscallion"
19. "Beyond the Castle Walls"
20. "Forgotten Pathway"
21. "Fairy Ring"
22. "Largo D'Armour"
23. "Whippersnapper"
24. "Kissing Gate"
25. "To the Lighthouse"
26. "Driftwood"
27. "Festoons and Billows"
28. "Flotsam and Jetsam"
29. "Sunfish Shallows"
30. "Smart Alec"
31. "Prayer for Natalie"
32. "Out and Beyond"

== Personnel ==
- Anthony Phillips – 6-string classical guitar, 10-string guitar, 12-string guitar, cittern, English and Greek bouzouki, charango, mandolin
