= Private Parts & Pieces =

Studio album by Anthony Phillips
- Released: November 1978
- Recorded: 1972–1976
- Studio: Send Barns, Woking, Surrey
- Genre: Progressive rock; folk rock
- Length: 56:46
- Label: Passport
- Producer: Anthony Phillips; Harry Williamson

Anthony Phillips chronology
| Wise After the Event (1978) | Private Parts & Pieces (1978) | Sides (1979) |

Private Parts & Pieces is the third studio album by English musician and composer Anthony Phillips, released in November 1978 by Passport Records in the US and in April 1979 by Arista Records in the UK. Unlike his earlier solo records, the album is a primarily acoustic, retrospective collection of home-recorded demos and unreleased material originally spanning 1972 to 1976. Conceived as a way to utilise shelved recordings, the album was largely put together with a studio constructed at the home of Phillips's parents in Send, Surrey. Instead of attempting a polished, commercial project, the record presents an intimate, eclectic mix of guitar and piano solos, duets, and small ensembles.

Initially pressed as a limited edition of 5,000 copies in the UK to accompany his subsequent studio release, Sides (1979), the album was positively received as an essential showcase of his diverse compositional sketches. Its unexpected cult success inspired Phillips to establish the long-running Private Parts & Pieces archival series, which eventually spanned twelve volumes.

== Background and recording ==
In early 1978, Phillips secured a three-album record deal with Arista Records which allowed for the UK release of his second studio album Wise After the Event (1978) in May of that year. He then started work on his next album which took a different direction than his previous two in regards to its content, as rather than making a conscious attempt at a produced and fully arranged album, he assembled pieces of acoustic music that he had written and recorded but remained unreleased. The main reason for the album was that Phillips had learned from his manager Tony Smith that musician and producer Brian Eno had formed a record label primarily focused on instrumental music. However, Phillips recalled that the label was disinterested in the tracks as it wanted to feature more ambient and synthesised music.

The idea was discarded until Phillips was making his fourth studio album Sides (1979) when Arista Records agreed to package the first 5,000 copies of Sides with Private Parts & Pieces as a free accompaniment. Phillips felt particularly lucky with Arista agreeing to put out the album as he deemed it "the best of the home recordings" with tracks that were "simple, a bit rough at the edges" with substandard presentation but were strong in character and emotion. Whereas before Phillips gave reasons why not to include a track on an album he was making, producing Private Parts & Pieces made the excuses no longer matter.

The songs on Private Parts & Pieces were recorded between 1972 and 1976 at Send Barns, a recording facility set-up at the home of Phillips's parents in Woking, Surrey. He is credited as the album's co-producer with duties also completed by Harry Williamson. The earliest pieces were put down on a Revox 2-track tape machine before Phillips installed a TEAC 4-track with added Dolby noise reduction. The 12-string guitar played on the album was built by Rivers Jobe, one of Phillips's former school bandmates in Anon. In a 2014 interview, Phillips revealed that a radio broadcast can be heard in the background in the opening of one of the album's tracks. After completing the initial mixes himself, problems arose when Phillips handed the completed tracks to Ray Staff for mastering at London's Trident Studios as his inexperience had caused numerous technical errors which Staff had to correct.

The album's artwork was designed and illustrated by artist Peter Cross, who depicted a soldier going off to war in the winter and returning home during a summer. Phillips had high praise for Cross's design, rating it among his best.

== Music ==
"Beauty and the Beast" is a piano piece that was recorded in 1972, the first of two pieces on the album recorded that year, and inspired upon Phillips hearing one of Chopin's piano nocturnes. It features Phillips on piano, a pin piano, an acoustic classical guitar. Phillips noted the track was recorded in four hours, and developed at a time when he experimented his technique such as playing at different speeds. It was recorded in "fake stereo" as he flipped from one track to another during the piece, resulting in the two tracks running slightly out of sync, but it ended up "fast enough not to matter". "Field of Eternity" is a classical guitar piece written in 1972 and recorded in 1976, credited to Phillips and his former Genesis bandmate Mike Rutherford. It is derived from what Phillips calls a "massive, straggly" composition of the same name; it contains themes from a movement of "Flamingo" that was ultimately discarded and a small section of what Phillips calls "an old, unrecorded Genesis song" in the album notes. Following the release of the Genesis Archive 1967–75 (1998) box set, it became clear that the Genesis song in question (not actually "unrecorded") was "Pacidy". "Tibetan Yak-Music" was recorded on a 12-string guitar with unconventional tuning accompanied by what Phillips described as "graphics" from Williamson who created vocal-like effects at the end of the piece, and changed the graphic equalisation on the guitar track so it changes in timbre multiple times. Phillips described the track as "virtually improvised". It originated from sessions with Harry Williamson in early 1976 that were scheduled for a television soundtrack based on Tarka the Otter. "Lullaby–Old Father Time" is performed on four guitars: one acoustic 12-string, two acoustic 6-strings, and one electric guitar. "Harmonium in the Dust (or Harmonious Stradosphore)" features Phillips playing a harmonium and Fender Stratocaster. He did not own a synthesiser at the time of recording, so he used a harmonium as it could make a sustained note. "Tregenna Afternoons" is the second track on the album composed in 1972. It takes its name from Phillips's time at Tregenna Castle in Cornwall that overlooks St Ives Bay. Phillips wrote "Reaper" in 1970, shortly after his departure from Genesis, and wrote "Autumnal" in 1972. "Flamingo" is the first movement to a proposed 12-string guitar concerto.

== Release ==
Professional ratings
Review scores
| Source | Rating |
|---|---|
| Allmusic | 4/5 stars |

Arista released Private Parts & Pieces as an accompaniment to Phillips's next "full" studio release Sides (1979), with an initial print of 5,000 copies. Phillips originally intended to have Private Parts & Pieces as a one-off album concept, but it was enough of a success for him to continue with the series featuring tracks "not on large scale" and "homely". The second edition, Private Parts & Pieces II: Back to the Pavilion, was released in April 1980.

== Reissues ==
The 1990 CD reissue of Private Parts & Pieces included two new, solo recordings of material that date from Phillips' time in Genesis. These songs were a new recording of "Stranger", a track from 1969, and a demo version of "Silver Song".

In 2010, as part of Voiceprint's re-issue campaign of Phillips' back catalogue, the album was re-issued as a double CD with Private Parts and Pieces II: Back to the Pavilion. This release is newly remastered by Simon Heyworth, retains the two bonus tracks from the previous CD release, and adds a new bonus track, "Movement IV from Guitar Quintet", which was recorded in 1976 and had never been released.

On 11 September 2015, Esoteric Recordings released a 5-disc box set containing the first four volumes in the Private Parts & Pieces series and a fifth disc of previously unreleased material.

== Track listing ==
All songs written by Anthony Phillips except "Field of Eternity", co-written by Mike Rutherford.

Side one (Home side)
| No. | Title | Length |
|---|---|---|
| 1. | "Beauty and the Beast" | 4:08 |
| 2. | "Field of Eternity" | 5:10 |
| 3. | "Tibetan Yak-Music" | 6:09 |
| 4. | "Lullaby–Old Father Time" | 1:15 |
| 5. | "Harmonium in the Dust (or Harmonious Stradosphore)" | 2:29 |
| 6. | "Tregenna Afternoons" | 7:49 |

Side two (Away side)
| No. | Title | Length |
|---|---|---|
| 1. | "Reaper" | 7:38 |
| 2. | "Autumnal" | 5:57 |
| 3. | "Flamingo" | 11:06 |
| 4. | "Seven Long Years" | 2:58 |

Private Parts & Pieces — 2010 and 2015 reissue bonus tracks
| No. | Title | Length |
|---|---|---|
| 11. | "Stranger" | 6:11 |
| 12. | "Silver Song" (Demo) | 3:19 |
| 13. | "Movement IV from Guitar Quintet" | 7:08 |

== Personnel ==
Credits adapted from the album's 1978 sleeve notes.

Music

- Anthony Phillips – 12-string guitar, classical guitar, piano, Fender Stratocaster, pin piano, harmonium, vocals
- Harry "Piranhaphone" Williamson – "graphics" on "Tibetan Yak-Music"

Production

- Anthony Phillips – production (except "Tibetan Yak-Music")
- Harry Williamson – production ("Tibetan Yak-Music" only)
- Ray Staff – mixing and mastering at Trident Studios, London
- Dave Powell – equipment
- Peter Cross – artwork
- Brian Murray-Smith – management
- Tony Smith – management
