= Anthony Phillips =

British musician and composer (born 1951)

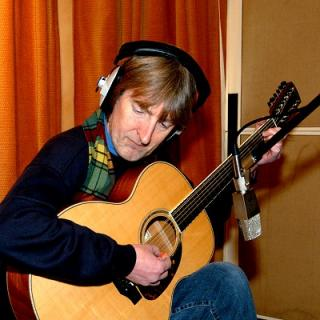
- Phillips in 2005

Background information
- Born: Anthony Edwin Phillips; 23 December 1951 (age 74); Chiswick, Middlesex
- Genres: Progressive rock; folk rock; neo-classical; electronic
- Instruments: Guitar; vocals; keyboards
- Years active: 1967–present
- Labels: Hit & Run Music; Virgin; Voiceprint; Vertigo; RCA; Arista; Passport
- Website: anthonyphillips.co.uk

Anthony Edwin Phillips (born 23 December 1951) is an English musician, songwriter, and composer who co-founded the progressive rock band Genesis. He served as the group's original lead guitarist from 1967 until his departure in 1970, performing on their formative studio albums From Genesis to Revelation (1969) and Trespass (1970). His early 12-string acoustic guitar arrangements heavily shaped the band's signature pastoral sound. Phillips voluntarily left the group on the eve of their mainstream breakthrough due to increasing stage fright and health complications. This exit has frequently led music critics to compare his trajectory to that of other early departed band members.

Following his departure, Phillips stepped back from the music industry to pursue formal education in classical orchestration and music theory. He emerged as a solo artist with his debut album, The Geese & the Ghost (1977). He subsequently established a prolific and diverse multi-instrumental solo career. His catalogue spans mainstream pop projects, ambient and experimental recordings, and his extensive multi-volume Private Parts & Pieces series. Alongside his solo discography, Phillips is a highly active library music composer for television and film, originating from his first productions in 1976 which intensified from 1981 when he signed with the production music label Atmosphere.

== Early life ==
Phillips was born on 23 December 1951 in Chiswick, then a part of Middlesex, and grew up in the nearby Putney and Roehampton areas. He attended St Edmund's preparatory school in Hindhead, Surrey, during which he formed a group and took part in a performance of "My Old Man's a Dustman" in the school hut as the singer, but forgot the words and was kicked out. This led to his decision to learn the guitar. The Shadows were a major early influence on Phillips, who learned enough to perform a rendition of "Foot Tapper" in the school lounge. At thirteen Phillips acquired a Fender Stratocaster and wrote his first song, "Patricia", an instrumental about the first girl he had a crush on. It gradually evolved into the Genesis song "In Hiding", which appears on From Genesis to Revelation. He was not entirely a self-taught guitar player; he received some tuition in rudimentary chords from classical guitarist David Channon, who became a big source of inspiration for Phillips, and used sheet music to songs by the Beatles that his mother would send him. Phillips then picked up more chord knowledge, and learned to copy music "reasonably well". As a teenager, Phillips briefly lived in the United States.

In April 1965, Phillips attended Charterhouse, an independent school in Godalming, Surrey. In the following month, he formed a band with fellow pupils Rivers Jobe, Richard Macphail, Mike Rutherford, and Rob Tyrell, naming themselves Anon. They based their sets on songs by the Beatles and the Rolling Stones, and recorded one demo, Phillips's song "Pennsylvania Flickhouse". The group disbanded in December 1966. Phillips was also a member of another band during 1966, Spoken Word, which included David Thomas (vocals), Ronnie Gunn (piano), Jeremy Ensor (bass, later of the Principal Edwards Magic Theatre), David Chadwick (guitar), and Peter Gabriel (drums). They recorded an acetate, a cover of "Evening".

== Career ==
=== 1967–1970: Genesis ===
In January 1967, after Anon had split up, Phillips and Rutherford became a songwriting unit and started recording several demos. They invited Charterhouse pupil Tony Banks, a member of Garden Wall, another disbanded school group, to play keyboards. Banks agreed, and suggested involving his Garden Wall bandmates, singer Peter Gabriel (the same one who was the drummer for Spoken Word) and drummer Chris Stewart. After the five made a demo tape, it was given to Jonathan King, who signed them to his publishing company and had them record some singles. He named the group Genesis, and suggested they record a studio album, which became From Genesis to Revelation. Phillips was particularly angry when King added string arrangements to their songs without their knowledge, since the limitations of the recording technology meant that everything else on the album had to be reduced to mono as a consequence. Phillips said he had little role in Genesis's songwriting during this period, and that most of the songs on From Genesis to Revelation were written by Gabriel and Banks.

In September 1969, the 17-year-old Phillips chose not to pursue a university degree and instead reunite with Gabriel, Banks and Rutherford after they had decided to become a full-time band. However, early in 1970 the constant touring had become wearing on Phillips partly due to the lack of scope for solos in the band's set and the shortage of time to develop new material. To further complicate matters he had developed stage fright which got progressively worse as time went on, and battled with it for three months thinking it was a passing phase. After falling ill with bronchial pneumonia, Phillips was advised by his doctor to quit the band. In June 1970, Phillips had recovered enough to reunite with his bandmates and record their second album, Trespass. Despite his various problems at the time, Phillips enjoyed the recording sessions. By this time Genesis songs were more often written by the group as a whole, and Phillips was pleased when a song he had originally written by himself, "Visions of Angels", was expanded with a group-composed middle section that he felt made the song much more powerful. After recording finished in July the band resumed touring, though early into the tour Phillips announced his decision to leave. His final gig took place at Haywards Heath on 18 July. Tour manager Richard Macphail later said that the group seriously considered disbanding altogether in the wake of Phillips's departure.

Nursery Cryme, the next Genesis album, opens with "The Musical Box" which is based on a piece written by Phillips and Rutherford originally titled "F#" (pronounced "F Sharp"). Steve Hackett, who became Genesis's guitarist half a year after Phillips left, commented that at the time of their fifth album, Selling England by the Pound, the 12-string guitar style developed during Phillips's era was still important to Genesis's work and he felt Phillips deserved more credit for "architecting the sound of Genesis".

=== 1970–1977: Studies and teaching ===
After leaving Genesis, Phillips lacked a solid direction. He secured a place at the University of Kent to study history, but later said he had a "quasi-nervous breakdown" around this time and "the idea of going to university seemed completely terrifying." He had recently listened to the Karelia Suite by Jean Sibelius and recognised his musical ability was "terribly limited", which encouraged him to become a more proficient musician. He studied harmony, counterpoint, and orchestration at Guildhall School of Music and Drama in London on a part-time basis and from 1972, began teaching classical guitar. He became a qualified music teacher in 1974 and taught at Reed's School in Cobham. In the following year, he taught troubled adolescents in rehabilitation at Peper Harow House in Godalming which lasted into the 1980s. By the late 1970s, Phillips had become proficient at the piano.

=== 1977–present: Solo career ===
==== Albums ====
Phillips' debut solo album The Geese & the Ghost was released in 1977, and written and recorded intermittently between 1969 and 1976. It is an acoustic folk progressive rock album that was originally a collaboration with Mike Rutherford, but the latter was too involved with Genesis and had limited availability. Peter Cross produced the album's cover artwork, and would collaborate with Phillips on his future record sleeves until the 2000s. Although the album failed to make a commercial impact, it has gained retrospective acclaim.

Phillips considered furthering his music education, but The Geese & the Ghost had earned enough for him to continue making albums. He signed a three-album deal with Arista Records, but the label insisted on more direct and commercially oriented songs. The first album was Wise After the Event, and featured Rupert Hine, Michael Giles, Mel Collins, and John G. Perry, with Phillips on lead vocals. Released in 1978, it also failed commercially. In the same year, a compilation of off-cuts and incomplete pieces was released as Private Parts & Pieces on Passport Records the US. According to Phillips, the series "arose partly out of poverty. I was just getting by, library music was just getting going. I had to issue a collection of twelve-string or solo-piano stuff to boost my income." Phillips continued with the series and put out twelve Private Parts and Pieces albums that range in musical style; the most recent edition, The Golden Hour was released in 2024.

Sides was his final album released on Arista, and features one side of pop-oriented material and another of more adventurous and progressive rock-inspired tracks. His next album was 1984 in 1981, which marked a major stylistic shift to electronic synthesizers and drum machine. In 1982, Phillips moved out of his parents' home in Send, Surrey to Clapham, south London, where he set up a recording studio. He struggled to pay the mortgage at first, and had several lodgers to help compensate. Phillips continued with commercial-oriented pop with his next album Invisible Men, released in 1983. Like with Sides and 1984, it failed commercially.

In 1987, Phillips went to the US to promote Private Parts & Pieces VII: Slow Waves, Soft Stars as it has attracted some attention in the ambient and New-age circles. During his visit he was a guest presenter for VH1, and a proposed album for the New-age label Windham Hill Records was shelved as he "got the brief so completely wrong". Some of this material was later included on his 2024 album, The Golden Hour – Private Parts And Pieces XII. His fortunes increased soon after the project with Windham Hill Records collapsed, when he signed a publishing deal with Virgin Records as a television and film writer, which also granted him an advance, two studio album releases, and a reissue of his back catalogue. This allowed him to purchase new equipment and marked a return to making a full-scale album, the instrumental Slow Dance.

In 1988 he recorded an album with Harry Williamson called Tarka. The album's cover featured a picture of a woman and did not credit Phillips or Williamson, which led to it often being filed under "female vocalist" in record shops. Phillips returned to the acoustic guitar with Field Day in 2005.

In 2014, Esoteric Recordings acquired Phillips' back catalogue and began a reissue campaign of most of his albums with bonus content.

In 2024, Phillips revealed he had a potential new album of solo piano pieces, but ongoing wrist problems has prevented him completing it. He had expressed a wish to produce another full-scale album like Slow Dance, but said he lacked energy to practice, write, and record, and was no longer interested to become familiar with contemporary recording equipment.

==== Library music ====
Since leaving Genesis, Phillips' main source of income has been from his library music for television and film. His first commissions were for Riverside Studios in 1976, and included a piece for a shampoo advert. In 1981, he signed with the newly-formed production music label Atmosphere (now a part of Universal Production Music) and has appeared on many of its releases. In 1994, Atmosphere was acquired by BMG and the uptake in commission work secured him financially: "I made almost nothing for the first 25 years of my life, then was very lucky." Phillips produces music for other companies, such as Extreme Music, 9 Lives, APM, Addictive Tracks, Audio Wallpaper, West One, and Cavendish, sometimes in collaboration with Chris White, Samuel Bohn, or James Collins.

==== Other projects ====
Phillips began writing material with Andrew Latimer of Camel in 1981, and was a featured performer on that band's album, The Single Factor (released in 1982). He co-wrote "Tears on the Ballroom Floor" for I Hear Talk by Bucks Fizz.

In 2008, Italian journalist Mario Giammetti published a biography on Phillips entitled The Exile.

== Discography ==
=== With Genesis ===
- From Genesis to Revelation (1969)
- Trespass (1970)
- Genesis Archive 1967–75 (1998; box set compilation)
- Platinum Collection (2004; compilation)
- Genesis 1970–1975 (2008; box set)
- R-Kive (2014; box set compilation)
- BBC Broadcasts (2023; box set of live recordings)

=== Solo ===
- The Geese & the Ghost (1977)
- Wise After the Event (1978)
- Private Parts & Pieces (1978)
- Sides (1979)
- Private Parts & Pieces II: Back to the Pavilion (1980)
- 1984 (1981)
- Private Parts & Pieces III: Antiques (1982)
- Invisible Men (1983)
- Private Parts & Pieces IV: A Catch at the Tables (1984)
- Harvest of the Heart (1985; compilation)
- Private Parts & Pieces V: Twelve (1985)
- Private Parts & Pieces VI: Ivory Moon (1986)
- Private Parts & Pieces VII: Slow Waves, Soft Stars (1987)
- Tarka (1988, with Harry Williamson)
- Missing Links Volume One: Finger Painting (1989)
- Slow Dance (1990)
- Private Parts & Pieces VIII: New England (1992)
- Sail the World (1994)
- Missing Links Volume Two: The Sky Road (1994)
- Gypsy Suite (1995, with Harry Williamson)
- The Living Room Concert (1995)
- The Meadows of Englewood (1996, with Guillermo Cazenave)
- Private Parts & Pieces IX: Dragonfly Dreams (1996)
- Missing Links Volume Three: Time and Tide (1997)
- Live Radio Sessions (1998, with Guillermo Cazenave; live radio sessions recorded 1997)
- Archive Collection Volume I (1998)
- Private Parts & Pieces X: Soirée (1999)
- Radio Clyde (2003; live radio session recorded 1978)
- Archive Collection Volume II (2004)
- Field Day (2005)
- Wildlife (2007, with Joji Hirota)
- Missing Links Volume Four: Pathways & Promenades (2009)
- Ahead of the Field: Music for TV and Film (2010)
- Seventh Heaven (2012, with Andrew Skeet)
- Private Parts & Pieces XI: City of Dreams (2012)
- Harvest of the Heart: An Anthology (2014; box set compilation)
- Strings of Light (2019)
- Private Parts & Pieces XII: The Golden Hour (2024)
- Gemini: Pieces for Piano (2026)

=== Appears on ===
- Intergalactic Touring Band – Intergalactic Touring Band (1977)
- Mike Rutherford – Smallcreep's Day (1980)
- Mother Gong – Battle of the Birds (1981)
- Camel – The Single Factor (1982)
- Iva Twydell – Duel (1982)
- Asha (Denis Quinn) – Open Secret (1987)
- Asha (Denis Quinn) – Mystic Heart (1989)
- Asha (Denis Quinn) – Amadora (1991)
- David Thomas & Ronnie Gunn – The Giants Dance (1996)
- Various Artists – Sport + Leisure (1996)
- ProgAID – All Around the World (2004)
- Robert Foster – Guitar Sketches (2006)
- Steve Hackett – Out of the Tunnel's Mouth (2009)
- Various Artists – Factual Underscores 2 (2012)
- Various Artists – The Summer Soundtrack (2013)
- Al Lethbridge – Inspiring Worlds (2014)
- Various Artists – Children's Party Themes-Halloween (2014)
- John Hackett – Another Life (2015)
- Various Artists – My Love Will Get You Home (2015)
- Ellesmere – "Les Chateaux de la Loire" (2015)
- The Gift – Why the Sea is Salt (2016)
- Anna Madsen – Efflorescence (2016)
- Various Artists – Science and Technology (2017)
- Various Artists – Harmony for Elephants (2018)
- Anon – "Pennsylvania Flickhouse" (2019)
- Algebra – Deconstructing Classics (2019)

== Sources ==
- Banks, Tony; Collins, Phil; Gabriel, Peter; Hackett, Steve; Rutherford, Mike (2007). Dodd, Philipp (ed.). Genesis. Chapter and Verse. Weidenfeld & Nicolson. ISBN 978-0-297-84434-1.
- Bowler, Dave; Dray, Bryan (1992). Genesis: A Biography. Sidgwick & Jackson Ltd. ISBN 978-0-283-06132-5.
- Frame, Pete (1983). The Complete Rock Family Trees. Omnibus Press. ISBN 978-0-7119-0465-1.
- Giammetti, Mario (2020). Genesis 1967 to 1975 - The Peter Gabriel Years. Kingmaker. ISBN 978-1-913218-62-1.
- Powell, Mark (2014). Interviews – Anthony Phillips 2. Cherry Red TV.
