= Peter Cross (illustrator) =

British illustrator (born 1951)

Peter Cross (born 1951 in Guildford) is a British illustrator. His style features lifelike drawings of British wildlife, in cartoon-like situations. Ostensibly produced for children, they include sufficient visual puns to be of interest to adults. He first worked as a technical illustrator for Hawker Siddeley and also illustrated album sleeves, not least for guitarist Anthony Phillips and over 200 designs in the popular Harbottle Hamster range of greetings cards for Gordon Fraser.

== Bibliography ==
- Trouble for Trumpets (Ernest Benn, 1982, story by Peter Dallas-Smith), ISBN 0-394-86513-8
- Trumpets in Grumpetland (A & C Black, 1984, story by Peter Dallas-Smith), ISBN 0-394-87028-X
- 1588 And All This (Pavilion Books, 1988), ISBN 1-85145-279-6
- Boys Own Battle of Britain (Pavilion Books, 1990), ISBN 1-85145-378-4

=== Dinosaur Days series ===
(1985 unless shown, story by David Lloyd)

- Early Morning, ISBN 0-394-87379-3
- Breakfast, ISBN 0-394-87378-5
- The Terrible Thing, ISBN 0-394-87381-5
- Silly Games, ISBN 0-394-87380-7
- Little So-And-So and the Dinosaurs (1993; compilation of the whole series), ISBN 0-7445-2029-0

=== Dudley Dormouse series ===
(1986 unless shown, Walker Books, text Judy Taylor)

Bonita Brodt of the Chicago Tribune wrote: "What makes the tales of Dudley Dormouse truly special are the intricate and colorful illustrations that bring the story to life on each page of these miniature, hardcover books."

- Dudley Goes Flying, ISBN 0-7445-0458-9
- Dudley and the Monster, ISBN 0-399-21329-5 - "The extraordinary illustrations are richly detailed in the style of many British children's books. They focus dramatically on the central action in each picture, allowing the young reader to direct his attention to the unfolding tale."
- Dudley and the Strawberry Shake, ISBN 0-399-21330-9 - Dudley the dormouse goes to a strawberry patch to pick strawberries, picks one and eats it but then mistakes a dogs nose for one. The dog does not like having his nose pulled and shakes his head until Dudley lets go and flies through the air. The story ends with Dudley going home for a nap to recover, and as he is falling asleep he remembers that he has left his strawberry picking gloves behind.
- Dudley in a Jam, ISBN 0-399-21331-7
- Dudley Bakes A Cake (1988), ISBN 0-399-21450-X
- The Adventures of Dudley Dormouse (1990; compilation of the whole series), ISBN 0-7445-1727-3

=== Contributions ===
- Henry Williamson; A Clear Water Stream (1976; cover and line illustrations by Cross)ISBN 0356082024
- The New Happy Families (Methuen, 1992; book and card game (made by Waddingtons Games); Cross illustrated the Camp family)

=== Anthony Phillips album artwork ===
- The Geese & The Ghost (1977)
- Wise After the Event (1978)
- Sides (1979)
- Private Parts & Pieces (1979)
- Private Parts & Pieces II: Back to the Pavilion (1980)
- Private Parts & Pieces III: Antiques (1982)
- Private Parts & Pieces V: Twelve (1985)
- Harvest of the Heart (1985)
- Private Parts & Pieces VI: Ivory Moon (1986)
- Private Parts & Pieces VIII: New England (1992)
- Anthology (1995)
- Radio Clyde (2003)
- Archive Collection Volume 2 (2004)
