= Private Parts & Pieces II: Back to the Pavilion =

Studio album by Anthony Phillips
- Released: 28 April 1980
- Recorded: June 1976–December 1977
- Studio: Various: Send Barns (Woking, Surrey) Olympic Studios (Barnes, London) Essex Studios The Farmyard Trident Studios (Soho, London) Slick Sound
- Genre: Progressive rock
- Length: 60:43
- Label: Passport
- Producer: Anthony Phillips; Anton Matthews; Rupert Hine

Anthony Phillips chronology
Sides (1979)	Private Parts & Pieces II: Back to the Pavilion (1980)	1984 (1981)

Private Parts & Pieces II: Back to the Pavilion is the fifth studio album by English musician and composer Anthony Phillips, released in April 1980 on Passport Records in the United States and Canada. It is the second instalment in his Private Parts & Pieces album series of previously recorded pieces that had been parts of or intended for other projects. Back to the Pavilion includes tracks recorded for Wise After the Event (1978), music during his time as a member of Genesis, and those commissioned as part of an aborted project to set Macbeth to music. It features musical contributions from Andy McCulloch and his former Genesis bandmate Mike Rutherford.

== Production ==
Following the release of Phillips's previous album, Sides, in April 1979, his recording contract with Arista Records came to an end, leaving him without a UK distributor. Phillips recalled that the commercial failure of his second and third commercial albums, Wise After the Event (1978) and Sides, respectively, convinced management to drop him from the label. Despite the setback, Phillips' deal with the US label Passport Records was still active, but the label refused to issue an advance for new music to be recorded and produced, leaving Phillips the option of putting music out that had already been written and recorded. He decided that his next release would be the second instalment of his Private Parts & Pieces album series, the first of which was released in 1978.

== Music ==
The music to "Scottish Suite" was originally written in mid-1976 for a "Shakespearean project using all the dialogue from the tragedies with rock music".

"Romany's Aria", "Chinaman", "Magic Garden", "Von Runkel's Yorker Music", "Tremulous" were recorded during the Wise After the Event sessions.

== Release ==
Professional ratings
Review scores
Source	Rating
Allmusic	4/5 stars

The album was released in the United Kingdom in 1990 by Virgin Records with a bonus track, "Lucy: An Illusion".

In 2010, as part of Voiceprint Records' reissue campaign of Phillips' back catalogue, the album was reissued as a double CD where the first CD was Private Parts & Pieces. This release is newly remastered by Simon Heyworth, retains the bonus track from the previous CD release, and adds new sleeve notes.

On 11 September 2015 Esoteric Recordings released a 5-disc box set containing the first four volumes in the Private Parts & Pieces series and a fifth disc of previously unreleased material.

== Track listing ==
All songs written by Anthony Phillips.

Side one
No.	Title	Length
1.	"Scottish Suite": (i) "Salmon Leap" – 2:46; (ii) "Parting Thistle" – 2:26; (iii) "Electric Reaper" – 3:03; (iv) "Amorphous, Cadaverous and Nebulous" – 4:53; (v) "Salmon's Last Sleepwalk" – 2:07"	15:15
2.	"Lindsay"	3:50
3.	"K2"	8:53
4.	"Postlude: End of the Season"	0:32

Side two
No.	Title	Length
1.	"Heavens"	4:22
2.	"Spring Meeting"	3:52
3.	"Romany's Aria"	0:50
4.	"Chinaman"	0:41
5.	"Nocturne"	4:05
6.	"Magic Garden"	1:56
7.	"Von Runkel's Yorker Music"	0:41
8.	"Will O' the Wisp"	3:30
9.	"Tremulous"	1:06
10.	"I Saw You Today"	4:34
11.	"Back to the Pavilion"	2:51

CD bonus track
No.	Title	Length
20.	"Lucy: An Illusion"	3:52

== Personnel ==
Credits are adapted from the album's 1980 liner notes.

Music

- Anthony Phillips – 12-string guitar, classical guitar, electric guitar, piano, vocals, Polymoog
- Andy McCulloch – drums, percussion
- Mike Rutherford – bass on "Salmon Leap" and "Amorphous, Cadaverous and Nebulous"
- Rob Phillips – oboe on "Von Runkel's Yorker Music"
- Mel Collins – flute on "Tremulous"

Production

- Anthony Phillips – production
- Anton Matthews – production
- Rupert Hine – production
