= Archive Collection Volume II =

Compilation album by Anthony Phillips
- Released: 10 May 2004
- Recorded: 1971–1988
- Genre: Acoustic
- Label: Blueprint Records (UK)
- Producer: Anthony Phillips

Anthony Phillips chronology
Radio Clyde (2003)	Archive Collection Volume II (2004)	Field Day (2005)

Archive Collection Volume II is the second vault release from Anthony Phillips, following Archive Collection Volume I in 1998. Compiled by Anthony Phillips and Jonathan Dann, it is a 2 CD selection of previously unreleased pieces and variations recorded from 1971 to 1988.

It was released on 10 May 2004 on Blueprint Records (UK) and was re-issued in Japan on Arcangelo Records as a limited edition mini-vinyl sleeve in December 2007.

According to the liner notes, "Tregenna Afternoons" is a piece Ant invented to teach original Genesis drummer Chris Stewart how to play guitar.

The track "Fantomas opening theme" on CD2 features John Silver on drums. He was the second drummer for Genesis and the inspiration for the song "Silver Song".

== Track listing ==
=== Disc 1 ===
1. "Guitar Song" (demo, 1973) (1:58)
2. "The Anthem from Tarka" (demo, 1988) (3:47)
3. "Deep in the Night" (demo, 1977) (5:48)
4. "Bleak House" (instrumental mix, 1978) (6:13)
5. "Our Man in Japan" (library piece, 1979) (1:19)
6. "Child Song" (demo, 1973) (3:41)
7. "Old Wives Tale" (solo version, 1976) (4:45)
8. "Scottish Suite II" (1973/76): (i) "Leaping Salmon" (3:03)
9. "Scottish Suite II" (1973/76): (ii) "The Witching Hour" (1:20)
10. "Scottish Suite II" (1973/76): (iii) "Two Truths" (1:19)
11. "Scottish Suite II" (1973/76): (iv) "The Letter" (1:11)
12. "Scottish Suite II" (1973/76): (v) "Walpurgis Night" (1:03)
13. "Scottish Suite II" (1973/76): (vi) "Sweet Reaper" (1:01)
14. "Scottish Suite II" (1973/76): (vii) "Why Sinks This Cauldron?" (0:44)
15. "Scottish Suite II" (1973/76): (viii) "Her Last Sleepwalk" (0:46)
16. "Sally" (instrumental mix, 1982) (4:19)
17. "Windmill" (demo, 1971) (1:26)
18. "Tregenna Afternoons" (demo, 1973) (7:41)
19. "Lofty Vaults" (library piece, 1979) (1:21)
20. "Variation on a Theme of Fantomas" (demo, 1973) (5:04)
21. "Picardy Pictures" (demo, 1972) (4:30)
22. "Polar Lights" (library piece, 1979) (1:34)
23. "The Ridolfi Plot" (demo, 1978) (6:15)
24. "Falling For Love" (instrumental mix, 1982) (3:35)

=== Disc 2 ===
1. "Highland Fling" (library piece, 1979) (1:34)
2. "Prelude #1" (1981) (1:37)
3. "Siesta" (1981) (1:54)
4. "Bubble & Squeak" (1981) (1:11)
5. "Guru" (instrumental mix, 1982) (4:43)
6. "Shady Arbours" (1974) (1:46)
7. "West Side Alice" (1983) (2:59)
8. "Vic's Tango" (demo, 1983) (4:16)
9. "Seven Long Years" (instrumental mix, 1976) (3:02)
10. "Romeo & Juliet" (library piece, 1976) (0:34)
11. "I Saw You Today" (1978) (4:43)
12. "The Anthem From Tarka" (alternate mix of demo, 1988) (1:01)
13. "Quadrille" (from Alice) (1983) (2:57)
14. "Desert Suite" (1980): (i) "Sand Dance" (1:45)
15. "Desert Suite" (1980): (ii) "Pipelines" (1:08)
16. "Desert Suite" (1980): (iii) "End Theme" (1:40)
17. "Fantomas opening theme" (film music, 1973) (2:31)
18. "Sistine" (instrumental mix, 1982) (3:45)
19. "Sisters of Remindum" (basic mix, 1977/78) (4:28)
20. "Will the Last Man Off the Ice Rink (Please Turn Out the Lights)" (1973) (1:20)
21. "Finale" (instrumental mix, 1982) (5:11)

== Writing credits ==
All songs by Anthony Phillips except:

- Track 2 on CD1 and Track 12 on CD2 by Anthony Phillips and Simon Heyworth
- Tracks 3, 11 on CD1 and Track 6 on CD2 by Anthony Phillips and Mike Rutherford
- Track 24 on CD1 and Track 13 on CD2 by Anthony Phillips and Richard Scott

== Personnel ==
- Anthony Phillips - Guitars, keyboards, piano, vocals, drumbox, koto
- Mike Rutherford - 12-string guitar, bass
- Andy McCulloch - Drums
- John Silver - Drums
- Richard Scott - Roland TR-808 drum machine
- Joji Hirota - Percussion
- John G. Perry - Bass
- Michael Giles - Drums
- Jeff Dunne - Drums
- Martin Drover - Flugelhorn
