= The Geese & the Ghost =

Studio album by Anthony Phillips
- Released: March 1977
- Recorded: October 1974–November 1976
- Studios: Send Barns (Send, Surrey); Argonaut Galleries (Little Venice, London)
- Genres: Folk rock; progressive rock; symphonic rock
- Length: 47:19
- Labels: Hit & Run Music
- Producers: Anthony Phillips; Simon Heyworth; Michael Rutherford; David Thomas

Anthony Phillips chronology
The Geese & the Ghost (1977)	Wise After the Event (1978)

The Geese & the Ghost is the debut studio album by English musician, guitarist, and songwriter Anthony Phillips, released in March 1977 on Hit & Run Music in the UK and Passport Records in the US. Recorded intermittently between 1974 and 1976 following Phillips's departure from Genesis, the album blends pastoral progressive rock and British acoustic folk with lyrical themes and titles conjuring romantic, historical English imagery.

The album's origins trace back to 1969 when Phillips began co-writing material with his Charterhouse School classmate and Genesis bandmate Mike Rutherford. Phillips temporarily paused the material to study classical orchestration at the Guildhall School of Music and Drama. Writing resumed in 1973 as an intended collaboration album between Phillips and Rutherford, but Genesis's escalating success restricted Rutherford's time, prompting the project to transition into Phillips's solo debut. Recording took place at his Surrey home and Tom Newman's barge studio in Little Venice, featuring extensive appearances by Rutherford, flute by John Hackett, and lead vocals by Phil Collins on "Which Way the Wind Blows" and "God if I Saw Her Now".

After several major labels deemed the album unmarketable amidst the punk rock movement in the UK, it was released independently and peaked at No. 191 in the US while failing to chart in the UK. Despite its initial commercial failure, The Geese & the Ghost has achieved significant retrospective critical acclaim and its enduring cult status has seen it preserved through multiple expansive re-releases, culminating in a 3-disc Definitive Edition box set with 5.1 surround sound mixes and bonus material in 2015.

== Background and writing ==
In July 1970, Phillips left Genesis after three years citing illness with glandular fever and worsening stage fright. He began to write new material at a considerable pace, completing the arrangements to "Which Way the Wind Blows", "God if I Saw Her Now", and "Henry: Portraits from Tudor Times" on the 12-string guitar within ten days of leaving the group. He put demos of these songs to tape at the studio set up in his parents' home between late July and early August 1970, receiving assistance from friends Harry Williamson and former Genesis roadie David Rootes. Having put down these early ideas Phillips began to take a greater interest in classical music. At one point, he listened to a piece by Jean Sibelius and had "one of those strange revelations" and realised he was "terribly limited" and "narrow" as a musician, and declared to himself that his guitar playing lacked enough technique. Phillips tackled this by halting development on his songs and taking lessons in piano and classical guitar, and studied orchestration and harmony over the course of the following four years at the Guildhall School of Music and Drama in London. He also gave music lessons to pupils at two schools in Surrey, and later called it his "student period".

Phillips remained in close contact with his friend and Genesis guitarist and bassist Mike Rutherford and in the spring of 1972, the two agreed to work towards a potential joint album using Phillips's demos and other 12-string guitar pieces they had written before and during Phillips's time in Genesis. Development continued in August 1973 when Phillips and Rutherford met in their spare time before the latter returned to Genesis commitments, after which Phillips took charge over the album's direction and expanded its foundation of 12-string guitar based pieces towards folk and progressive rock using techniques he had learned from his orchestration tuition. Among the demos they developed during this time was their hymn tune "Take This Heart", released by Charisma Records in 1975, and the prospective 1974 release of the single "Silver Song" with "Only Your Love" on the B-side, that included Genesis drummer Phil Collins on lead vocals and drums. Demos of the latter two were recorded at Island Studios in November 1973 with producer Rhett Davies, the former dating back to 1969 as a parting farewell to Genesis drummer John Silver. In late 1973, Phillips and Rutherford had completed writing the album during a short break in Ireland, the "Misty Battlements" of the Henry suite being the last section worked out.

In the spring of 1974, Phillips began to select the material that would be used for the album. This included the titles: "Which Way the Wind Blows", "God if I Saw Her Now", "Henry: Portraits from Tudor Times", "D Instrumental", "Master of Time", "Collections", "I Saw You Today", and "Autumnal". "Autumnal" was an orchestral piece that Phillips had recorded with the orchestra at Guildhall School, but it was later removed from the final track listing due to the dissatisfaction from Charisma management. "Master of Time" was then left off as Phillips and Rutherford had run out of recording time.

== Recording ==
The first recording sessions took place in 1974 when Rutherford had spare time surrounding the recording of the Genesis album The Lamb Lies Down on Broadway. After choosing the final track running order, the two agreed to begin recording the basic guitar parts at Send Barns, the home of Phillips's parents in Woking, Surrey. To finance the project, Rutherford had pitched the album to Charisma and the label agreed to an advance of £3,000 which they used to purchase two reel-to-reel TEAC 4-track tape machines, a mixing desk, and outboard equipment.

After Rutherford left the project for upcoming touring commitments, matters changed in October 1974 after Genesis guitarist Steve Hackett had injured his hand, which pushed the opening dates back one month. With a narrow space of time in which to work, Rutherford rejoined Phillips in the studio and continued recording, which began with "Which Way the Wind Blows", the first track recorded, which features an electric guitar made to sound like a classical acoustic guitar. The pair soon ran into technical difficulties as the TEAC machines were creating static clicks that were heard upon playback, causing visits from numerous people who were able to fix the problem. Upon fixing, they put down tracks for all seven sections of "D Instrumental", four parts to the Henry suite, an outline of "Silver Song", and an untitled improvised guitar instrumental. The late 1974 sessions included the first overdubs recorded which featured the first of several additional musicians on the album. Phillips had his younger brother Robin play the oboe for "D Instrumental" (now called "The Geese and the Ghost") and Hackett's brother John playing the flute. The latter had completed his education and was invited by Rutherford to play on the album at a time when he considered pursuing music as a career, taking it "as a welcome sign that I had made the right decision!" Upon Rutherford's return to Genesis, Phillips continued working by himself which involved the basic tracks put down for "God if I Saw Her Now" on 26 November, and working on additional parts for the songs already put down until Christmas.

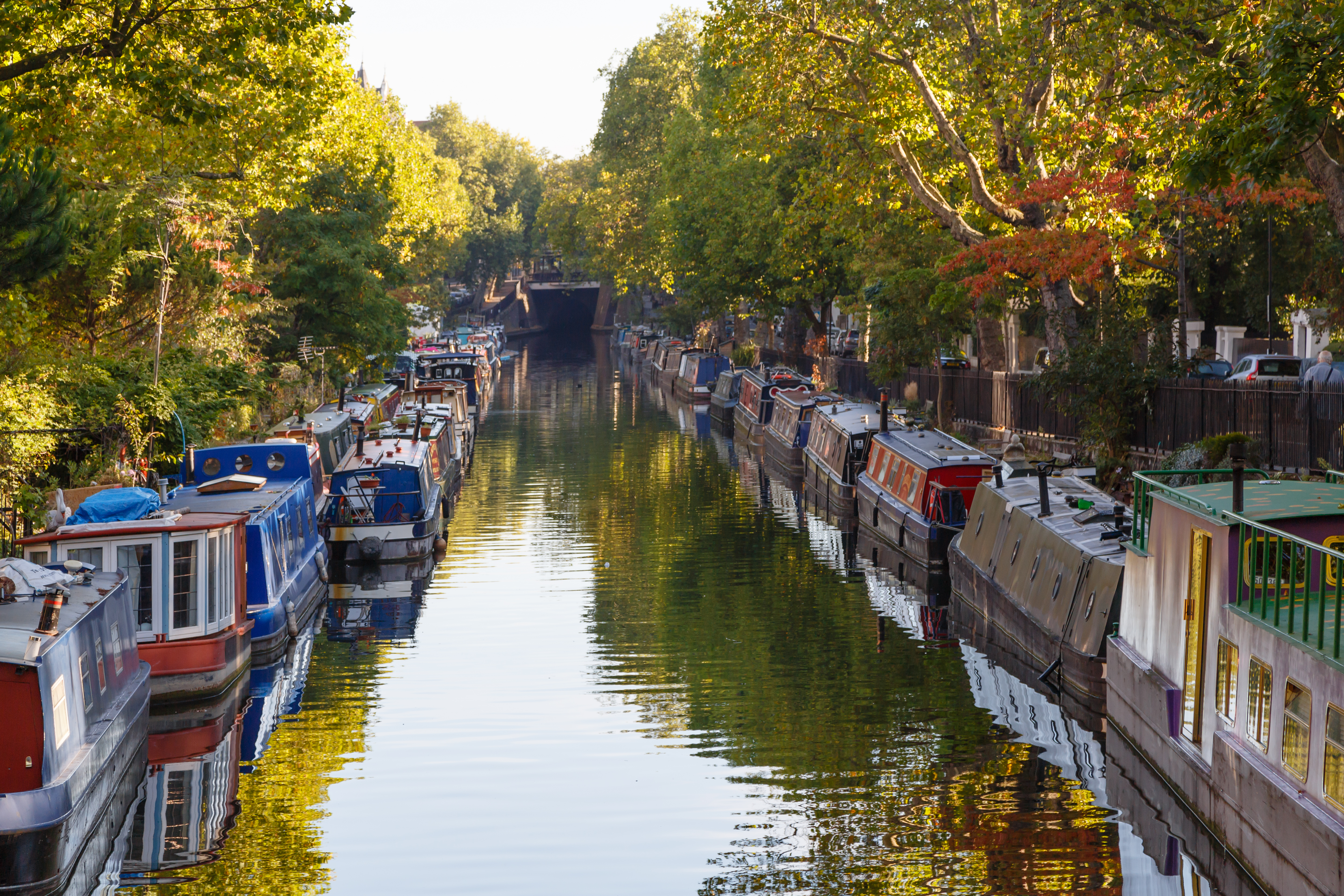
In 1975, recording relocated to a canal boat in London's Little Venice (pictured)

Phillips resumed with recording on 7 April 1975, bringing in Rootes to assist in technical duties while further overdubs and other final arrangements were put down. After Genesis wrapped up touring in May, Rutherford reunited with Phillips, and the pair decided to place the finished overdubs onto 16-track tape to facilitate the parts yet to be recorded. Having learned Tom Newman's facility was available on The Argonaut, his canal boat studio in Little Venice, London, sessions began there in July. Recording soon ran into problems as the studio was still in its infancy and suffered from numerous malfunctions, plus incidents of the boat being hit by another during recording, causing restarts. Phillips's longtime producer Simon Heyworth joined the project at this time, providing assistance and encouragement. Many of the session musicians on the album were students at Guildhall who had also played on the orchestra session for "Autumnal". One of them was Martin Westlake, who arrived at the boat to record the timpani parts but found the instrument was too large to fit through the door. The problem was solved after the owners of the neighbouring barge agreed to have the timpani recorded on their boat with extended microphone leads run through to the studio. John Hackett recorded his second flute session on the Argonaut. He was the subject of a prank from Phillips, who initially handed him a flute part that he described as "Stravinsky on speed" with notes too difficult for him to play, leaving him "quake inside" for several moments before he received the real arrangement. The final session on the boat was for the vocals on "Triumphant Return", formed of several of Phillips's friends who were invited to celebrate the end of recording. They are collectively named the Barge Rabble on the album's liner notes.

The majority of the mixing duties were completed by Phillips with assistance from Heyworth after Rutherford resumed working with Genesis. The second half of "Collections" and "Sleepfall: The Geese Fly West" still required further work, yet as the album neared completion in early 1976 it was presented to Charisma, and the label chose not to release it, leaving the album unfinished. A meeting with Virgin Records A&R man Simon Draper in April also came to nothing. It remained shelved due to the difficulty Phillips had in getting it released elsewhere, recalling others had deemed it "'pleasant and euphoric, but not instant'". Meanwhile, Phillips secured work in various projects and recorded his first library music compositions and in late 1976, submitted his application to study for a music degree. He then received unexpected news that Marty Scott of the US-based independent label Passport Records expressed an interest to release The Geese & the Ghost, and brought in Robin, John Hackett, and Jack Lancaster to record the incomplete woodwind sections at Send Barns in October. This was followed by a final overdubbing session at Olympic Studios in London with engineer Anton Matthews in the following month, and the album was mastered by Greg Calbi at Trident Studios. A search to find a willing UK distributor proved to be too difficult, so his manager Tony Smith, who also managed Genesis, established the Hit & Run label to secure a home release. A deal with Vertigo Records ensured its distribution to other territories, including New Zealand, Japan, and Argentina.

== Cover art ==
The Geese and the Ghost was the first of many Anthony Phillips albums to feature cover art by Peter Cross. Phillips was pointed to Cross by a friend, and found him working alone in a converted greenhouse in his parents' garden. Phillips remarked that "Peter had this gift of English Romanticism with this kind of – equally English – passion for eccentric gadgets – you know, Heath Robinson, etc."

== Release ==
Professional ratings
Review scores
Source	Rating
AllMusic	3/5 stars

The Geese & the Ghost was released in March 1977. This was during the rise of punk, making its quasi-classical compositions, blatantly progressive rock song titles (e.g. "Henry: Portraits from Tudor Times"), and rococo cover art remarkably ill-suited to the contemporary market. Phillips later recalled, "[Manager] Tony Smith went round everywhere to try and sell The Geese and the Ghost. It wasn't a phenomenal-album-that-didn't-make-it-because-of-punk, but punk – or rather attitudes to it – didn't help. I met a guy years later at Nottingham University who told me that he'd sold his original copy of The Geese because it wasn't cool. He didn't want to be seen with it." It failed to chart in the UK, but reached No. 191 on the Billboard 200. Philips said he was told it sold just under 100,000 copies worldwide.

It was first released on CD by Virgin Records in 1990 and contains the demo of "Master of Time" as a bonus track. On 20 July 2007, the album was reissued in Japan as a 2-CD edition by Arcangelo Records, presented in a limited edition mini-vinyl sleeve. The first disc features a new remaster of the album with the 52-second "Lute's Chorus Reprise" section added to "Henry: Portrait of Tudor Times", and the second disc contains 14 tracks of previously unreleased demos, out-takes, and bonus tracks. This edition was released in the UK in a standard jewel case by Voiceprint Records on 14 April 2008.

Upon its release, Record World called The Geese and the Ghost "a very pleasing, beautifully orchestrated lp/fable that ought to please English rock fans and children alike." Paul Stump, in his History of Progressive Rock, said The Geese and the Ghost served as the template for nearly all of Phillips' solo work, and praised it as "orchestrated with innocent and idiosyncratic delicacy; the flavorful sonorities of woodwind against chiming spider-webbed guitars crossed an allusive, stylized folk texture with the churchy chord sequences that had always dominated Genesis's music."

On 7 April 2015, Esoteric Recordings released a 3-disc Definitive Edition of the album. Disc one contains a new stereo remaster completed in 2015; disc two contains the bonus material as previously released in the 2007 and 2008 reissues with the previously unreleased track "Only Your Love" from 1973, originally intended to be the B-side of "Silver Song"; and disc three is a DVD containing the album mixed in 5.1 surround sound. Included is a poster and a 24-page booklet with photos and extensive liner notes.

== Track listing ==
All tracks are written by Anthony Phillips, except where noted.

Side one
No.	Title	Writer(s)	Length
1.	"Wind-Tales"		1:02
2.	"Which Way the Wind Blows"		5:51
3.	"Henry: Portraits from Tudor Times": (i) "Fanfare"; (ii) "Lute's Chorus"; (iii) "Misty Battlements"; (iv) "Lute's Chorus (Reprise)" (Not included on pre-2007 releases of the album.); (v) "Henry Goes to War"; (vi) "Death of a Knight"; (vii) "Triumphant Return"	Phillips, Mike Rutherford	12:11
4.	"God If I Saw Her Now"		4:09

Side two
No.	Title	Writer(s)	Length
1.	"Chinese Mushroom Cloud"	Phillips, Rutherford	0:46
2.	"The Geese and the Ghost": Part I; Part II"	Phillips, Rutherford	15:40
3.	"Collections"		3:07
4.	"Sleepfall: The Geese Fly West"		4:33

== Personnel ==
Credits are adapted from the album's 1977 and 2008 liner notes.

Musicians

- Anthony Phillips – acoustic 12-string, 6-string, classical, electric 6 and 12-string guitars, bass guitar, dulcimer, bouzouki, synthesiser, Mellotron, harmonium, piano, organ, celeste, pin piano, drums, glockenspiel, timbales, bells and chimes, gong, lead vocals on "Collections" and "Master of Time (Demo)"
- Mike Rutherford – acoustic 12-string, 6-string, and classical guitars, bass guitar, organ, drums, timbales, glockenspiel, cymbals, bells
- Phil Collins – lead vocals on "Which Way the Wind Blows", "God If I Saw Her Now" and "Silver Song"
- Rob Phillips – oboe on "The Geese and the Ghost" and "Sleepfall: The Geese Fly West"
- Lazo Momulovich – oboe, cor anglais on "Henry: Portraits from Tudor Times" and "The Geese and the Ghost"
- John Hackett – flute on "God If I Saw Her Now", "Collections" and "Sleepfall: The Geese Fly West"
- Wil Sleath – flute, baroque flute, recorder, piccolo on "Henry: Portraits from Tudor Times"
- Jack Lancaster – flute, lyricon on "Sleepfall: The Geese Fly West"
- Charlie Martin – cello on "Chinese Mushroom Cloud" and "The Geese and the Ghost"
- Kirk Trevor – cello on "Chinese Mushroom Cloud" and "The Geese and the Ghost"
- Nick Hayley (with "friend") – violin on "The Geese and the Ghost"
- Martin Westlake – timpani on "Henry: Portraits from Tudor Times", "Chinese Mushroom Cloud" and "The Geese and the Ghost"
- Tom Newman – heckelphone, bulk eraser on "Master of Time" (Demo)
- Vivienne McAuliffe – vocals on "God If I Saw Her Now"
- Send Barns Orchestra
- Jeremy Gilbert – conductor
- Barge Rabble (voices of several friends) - chorus on "Triumphant Return"
- Ralph Bernascone – soloist (joke credit)
- David Thomas – classical guitar on "Master of Time" (Demo)
- Ronnie Gunn – harmonium, piano on "Master of Time" (Demo)

Production

- Anthony Phillips – producer, engineer
- Mike Rutherford – producer, engineer
- Simon Heyworth – producer, engineer
- Anton Matthews – mixing
- Greg Calbi – mastering
- Nick Blyth – equipment
- Tex Read – equipment
- Geoff Banks – equipment
- Peter Cross – cover design, art

== Charts ==
Chart (1977)	Peak position
US Billboard 200	191
