= Simon Heyworth =

English record engineer and producer

Simon Heyworth is an English record engineer and producer. He rose to prominence as engineer at Richard Branson's The Manor Studio in the 1970s, where he and Tom Newman worked on Tubular Bells (1973) by Mike Oldfield, which achieved significant commercial success in the UK. He has worked with various artists, including King Crimson, Simple Minds, Rick Wakeman, Iron Maiden, Marillion, and Nick Drake. In 2002, Heyworth set up his own audio mastering studio, Super Audio Mastering, in Devon.

== Career ==
While at prep school, Heyworth was in a band with future Genesis bassist/guitarist Mike Rutherford. He also went to school in Pasadena, California.

After returning to the UK, Heyworth attended the London Academy of Music and Dramatic Art, but quit his studies when he felt a career in theatre was not right for him. He then paired with recording engineer Tom Newman, and the two worked with businessman Richard Branson who bought The Manor Studio in Oxfordshire. The three did various projects, such as designing Virgin Records shops in Birmingham and Oxford Street. They convinced Branson to convert some of it into a recording studio, and Heyworth worked a tape operator while learning about sound mixing and producing.

While at The Manor, Heyworth and Newman engineered Tubular Bells (1973) by Mike Oldfield, which achieved significant commercial success in the UK.

== Personal life ==
Heyworth is married to Nicky.
