= Passport Records =

American record label (1973–1988)

Passport Records was a U.S.-based independent record label that existed between 1973 and 1988. It was notable for popularizing such artists as Larry Fast, FM, Richard Barone, and Wendy O. Williams. It was distributed by Jem Records in the United States and by GRT Records in Canada.

Passport was Jem's flagship label, eventually growing to form the Passport Records Group, which included the labels PVC Records, Passport Jazz, Audion Records, Import Records, and Visa Records.

== History ==
Passport Records was founded in 1973 by Jem Records, which had been co-founded in 1971 by Martin L. Scott, Jeff Tenenbaum and Ed Grossi. Passport was initially operated in partnership with Sire Records. The partnership between Jem and Sire ended in 1977, when Sire owner Seymour Stein sold the label to Warner Bros. Records.

Larry Fast was the first American artist signed to the label. His records were primarily released under the name of Synergy. Other artists on the label included FM, Al Stewart, Nektar, The Hunt, Gerry Rafferty, Link Wray, Tucky Buzzard, Three Dog Night, Human Sexual Response, Wendy O. Williams, Brand X, Anthony Phillips, Mike Rutherford, Robbie Krieger, David Johansen, Richard Barone & James Mastro, Utopia, Bill Nelson and Camel.

As of 1984, Passport had three albums in the Billboard top album charts. In 1986, Passport, led by JEM President Marty Scott, began operating separately from Jem internally, though it was still distributed by JEM.

The Passport Records Group, as part of the JEM Records bankruptcy, was closed in 1988. Marty Scott took Paradox Records to MCA where he operated the label from Warren, NJ.
