= List of Brand X members =

Brand X in 1978

Brand X were an English jazz fusion band from London. Formed in late 1974, the group originally featured vocalist and percussionist Phil Spinelli, guitarists John Goodsall and Peter Bonas, bassist Percy Jones, keyboardist Robin Lumley and drummer John Dillon. After Spinelli, Bonas and Dillon left, the remaining members and new drummer Phil Collins became a largely instrumental outfit. The latest lineup of Brand X included only one official member, Goodsall, alongside keyboardist Chris Clark, percussionist Scott Weinberger, and drummer Kenny Grohowski, and ended in 2021 with Goodsall's death.

The official Brand X website has asserted that the only official legal members of Brand X since its reformation were original members Jones, Goodsall, and Lumley. All other musicians during this time period are described as legally being "employees" and "guests".

== History ==
=== 1974–1980 ===
Brand X were formed in 1974 by Phil Spinelli, John Goodsall, Peter Bonas, Percy Jones, Robin Lumley and John Dillon. Before the end of the year, Dillon had left, and was replaced on a part-time basis by Genesis drummer Phil Collins. After recording an album for Island Records in February 1975 which is shelved, creative differences lead to the departure of both Bonas and Spinelli, leaving Brand X an instrumental four-piece. The group's debut album Unorthodox Behaviour was recorded between September and October 1975 and released the following year.

At the end of 1975, Brand X made their live concert debuts at several shows in and around London. For the performances, they added former Yes and King Crimson drummer Bill Bruford on additional percussion. Shows at the beginning of the following year saw Isotope's Jeff Seopardie in place on Bruford for a couple of shows, followed by Andy Ward of Camel for one, and finally Preston Heyman from late-February. This lineup recorded one album, which was released as Missing Period in 1997. After a final appearance at Reading Festival, Heyman was replaced by Morris Pert.

After recording the band's second album Moroccan Roll, Collins took a break from Brand X for the Genesis Wind & Wuthering Tour. He was initially replaced by Karma drummer Joe Blocker for a string of rehearsals, before Kenwood Dennard took over for shows starting in June. By April 1978, Lumley had followed Collins as the second core member of Brand X to step back from the band, opting instead to focus more on his work as a record producer. He was replaced by J. Peter Robinson in June, at the same time as Chuck Burgi was brought in to take over from Dennard.

In July 1978, during the tour in promotion of the forthcoming Masques, Goodsall was forced to leave temporarily after suffering tendinitis, with Mike Miller taking his place for the rest of the year. For the North American leg of the tour starting in October, the unavailable Burgi was replaced by Mike Clark. In April 1979, Brand X recorded with two lineups – the first with Goodsall, Jones, Robinson and Clark; the second with Goodsall, bassist John Giblin, Lumley and Collins. The material was released as Product in 1979, Do They Hurt? in 1980 and Is There Anything About? in 1982.

Following the recording of the three albums, Brand X toured with a lineup featuring Goodsall, Jones, Lumley, Robinson and Collins. For a month-long tour the following month, Collins was replaced by Clark. Following these dates, the group stopped working together and began to focus on other projects, although they never officially disbanded.

=== 1992–2021 ===
In 1992, Goodsall and Jones reformed Brand X with new drummer Frank Katz, releasing X-Communication and returning to live performances in December. They remained a trio until February 1996, when they recorded Manifest Destiny with new keyboardist Marc Wagnon and other contributors. For the subsequent tour, Katz was replaced by Pierre Moerlen due to problems with his passport, while Kris Sjobring took over from Wagnon. After a final tour in 1999 with Mick Stevens in place of Jones and John Holmes in place of Moerlen, the band broke up for a second time.

Seventeen years later, in the summer of 2016, Goodsall and Jones reformed Brand X for a third time, adding former drummer Kenwood Dennard and new members Chris Clark on keyboards and Scott Weinberger on percussion. The following year, Dennard was replaced by Kenny Grohowski. Founding member John Goodsall died on November 11, 2021. Following Goodsall's death, the two founding members Lumley and Jones confirmed Brand X's disbandment on November 14, 2021, via Facebook.

== Members ==
Image	Name	Years active	Instruments	Release contributions
	Percy Jones	1974–1980; 1992–1997; 2016–2020	bass; keyboards (1992–99); occasional vocals	all Brand X releases
	John Goodsall	1974–1978; 1979–1980; 1992–1999; 2016–2021 (until his death)	guitar; keyboards (1992–99); vocals (lead 1979, backing 1977)	all Brand X releases, except Live from Chicago (2015) and Live from Stockholm (2016)
	Robin Lumley	1974–1978; 1979–1980 (died 2023)	keyboards; synthesisers; piano; backing vocals	Unorthodox Behaviour (1976); Moroccan Roll (1977); Livestock (1977); Product (1979); Do They Hurt? (1980); Is There Anything About? (1982); Live at the Roxy LA (1995); all Brand X releases from Missing Period (1997) to Live from Ronnie Scotts (2015); Live from New York (2016)
	Peter Bonas	1974–1975	guitar	none
	Phil Spinelli	1974–1975	percussion; lead vocals	none
	John Dillon	1974	drums; percussion	none
	Phil Collins	1975–1976; 1977; 1979	drums; percussion; vocals	Unorthodox Behaviour (1976); Moroccan Roll (1977); Livestock (1977); Product (1979); Do They Hurt? (1980); Is There Anything About? (1982); Live at the Roxy LA (1995); Missing Period (1997); Live from Ronnie Scotts (2015)
	Bill Bruford	1975	percussion	none
	Jeff Seopardie	1976	percussion	none
	Andy Ward	1976	percussion	none
	Preston Heyman	1976	percussion	Missing Period (1997)
	Morris Pert	1976–1979 (died 2010)	percussion	all Brand X releases from Moroccan Roll (1977) to Do They Hurt? (1980), and from Timeline (1999) to Live from New York (2016)
	Joe Blocker	1977	drums; percussion	none
	Kenwood Dennard	1977–1978; 2016–2017	drums; percussion	Livestock (1977); Timeline (1999); Live from San Francisco (2015); But Wait... There's More! (2017)
	J. Peter Robinson	1978–1980	keyboards; synthesisers; piano; backing vocals	all Brand X releases from Masques (1978) to Is There Anything About? (1982); Live at the Roxy LA (1995); Live from Chicago (2015); Live from Stockholm (2016)
	Chuck Burgi	1978	drums; percussion	Masques (1978); Live from Stockholm (2016)
	Mike Miller	1978 (temporary substitute) (died 2025)	guitar	Live from Chicago (2015); Live from Stockholm (2016)
	Mike Clark	1978–1979; 1980	drums; percussion	Product (1979); Do They Hurt? (1980); Live from Chicago (2015)
	John Giblin	1979 (studio) (died 2023)	bass; backing vocals	Product (1979); Do They Hurt? (1980); Is There Anything About? (1982)
	Frank Katz	1992–1997	drums; percussion; occasional vocals	X-Communication (1992); Manifest Destiny (1997); Timeline (1999)
	Marc Wagnon	1996–1997	synthesisers; percussion	Manifest Destiny (1997)
	Kris Sjobring	1997–1999	keyboards; synthesisers	none
	Pierre Moerlen	1997 (died 2005)	drums; percussion	none
	John Holmes	1999	drums; percussion	none
	Mick Stevens	1999	bass	none
	Chris Clark	2016–2021	keyboards; synthesisers	But Wait... There's More! (2017); Locked & Loaded (2018); Live from the Rites of Spring Festival 2018 (2018)
	Scott Weinberger	2016–2021	percussion	But Wait... There's More! (2017); Locked & Loaded (2018); Live from the Rites of Spring Festival 2018 (2018)
	Kenny Grohowski	2017–2021	drums; percussion	Locked & Loaded (2018); Live from the Rites of Spring Festival 2018 (2018)

== Lineups ==
Period	Members	Releases
Mid – late 1974	Phil Spinelli – percussion, lead vocals; John Goodsall – guitar, backing vocals; Peter Bonas – guitar; Percy Jones – bass; Robin Lumley – keyboards, backing vocals; John Dillon – drums, percussion	none
Early 1975	Phil Spinelli – percussion, lead vocals; John Goodsall – guitar, backing vocals; Peter Bonas – guitar; Percy Jones – bass; Robin Lumley – keyboards, backing vocals; Phil Collins – drums, percussion	none
Early – late 1975	John Goodsall – guitar; Percy Jones – bass; Robin Lumley – keyboards, synthesisers; Phil Collins – drums, percussion	Unorthodox Behaviour (1976)
November – December 1975	John Goodsall – guitar; Percy Jones – bass; Robin Lumley – keyboards, synthesisers; Phil Collins – drums, percussion; Bill Bruford – percussion	none
January – February 1976	John Goodsall – guitar; Percy Jones – bass; Robin Lumley – keyboards, synthesisers; Phil Collins – drums, percussion; Jeff Seopardie – percussion	none
February 1976	John Goodsall – guitar; Percy Jones – bass; Robin Lumley – keyboards, synthesisers; Phil Collins – drums, percussion; Andy Ward – percussion	none
February – August 1976	John Goodsall – guitar; Percy Jones – bass; Robin Lumley – keyboards, synthesisers; Phil Collins – drums, percussion; Preston Heyman – percussion	Missing Period (1997)
August – December 1976	John Goodsall – guitar; Percy Jones – bass; Robin Lumley – keyboards, synthesisers; Phil Collins – drums, percussion; Morris Pert – percussion	Moroccan Roll (1977); Livestock (1977) – two tracks; Live from Ronnie Scotts (2015)
Early 1977	John Goodsall – guitar; Percy Jones – bass; Robin Lumley – keyboards, synthesisers; Joe Blocker – drums, percussion; Morris Pert – percussion	none
April 1977	John Goodsall – guitar; Percy Jones – bass; Robin Lumley – keyboards, synthesisers; Phil Collins – drums, percussion; Morris Pert – percussion	Livestock (1977) – one track
Spring 1977 – April 1978	John Goodsall – guitar; Percy Jones – bass; Robin Lumley – keyboards, synthesisers; Kenwood Dennard – drums, percussion; Morris Pert – percussion	Livestock (1977) – two tracks (features Collins as guest percussionist); Timeline (1999); Live in San Francisco (2015); Live from New York (2016)
May – July 1978	John Goodsall – guitar; Percy Jones – bass; J. Peter Robinson – keyboards, synthesisers; Chuck Burgi – drums, percussion; Morris Pert – percussion	Masques (1978)
July – August 1978	Percy Jones – bass; J. Peter Robinson – keyboards, synthesisers; Chuck Burgi – drums, percussion; Morris Pert – percussion	none
August – October 1978	Mike Miller – guitar (temporary substitute); Percy Jones – bass; J. Peter Robinson – keyboards, synthesisers; Chuck Burgi – drums, percussion; Morris Pert – percussion	Live from Stockholm (2016)
October – December 1978	Mike Miller – guitar (temporary substitute); Percy Jones – bass; J. Peter Robinson – keyboards, synthesisers; Mike Clark – drums, percussion; Morris Pert – percussion	Live from Chicago (2015)
April 1979 (recording lineup #1)	John Goodsall – guitar; John Giblin – bass; Robin Lumley – keyboards, synthesisers; Phil Collins – drums, percussion	Product (1979); Do They Hurt? (1980); Is There Anything About? (1982)
April 1979 (recording lineup #2)	John Goodsall – guitar; Percy Jones – bass; J. Peter Robinson – keyboards, synthesisers; Mike Clark – drums, percussion	Product (1979); Do They Hurt? (1980); Is There Anything About? (1982)
Summer – late 1979	John Goodsall – guitar; Percy Jones – bass; J. Peter Robinson – keyboards, synthesisers; Robin Lumley – keyboards, synthesisers; Phil Collins – drums, percussion	Live at the Roxy LA (1995)
Early – mid-1980	John Goodsall – guitar; Percy Jones – bass; J. Peter Robinson – keyboards, synthesisers; Robin Lumley – keyboards, synthesisers; Mike Clark – drums, percussion	none
Band inactive mid-1980 – mid-1992
Mid-1992 – February 1996	John Goodsall – guitar, keyboards; Percy Jones – bass, keyboards; Frank Katz – drums, percussion	X-Communication (1992); Timeline (1999)
February 1996 – early 1997	John Goodsall – guitar, keyboards; Percy Jones – bass, keyboards; Marc Wagnon – synthesizers, percussion; Frank Katz – drums, percussion	Manifest Destiny (1997)
Early – summer 1997	John Goodsall – guitar, keyboards; Percy Jones – bass, keyboards; Kris Sjobring – keyboards, synthesisers; Pierre Moerlen – drums, percussion	none
Spring – summer 1999	John Goodsall – guitar, keyboards; Mick Stevens – bass; Kris Sjobring – keyboards, synthesisers; John Holmes – drums, percussion	none
Band inactive summer 1999 – summer 2016
Summer 2016 – spring 2017	John Goodsall – guitar; Percy Jones – bass; Chris Clark – keyboards, synthesisers; Kenwood Dennard – drums; Scott Weinberger – percussion	But Wait... There's More! (2017)
Spring 2017 – October 2020	John Goodsall – guitar; Percy Jones – bass; Chris Clark – keyboards, synthesisers; Kenny Grohowski – drums; Scott Weinberger – percussion	Locked & Loaded (2018); Live from the Rites of Spring Festival (2018)
October 2020 – November 2021	John Goodsall – guitar; Chris Clark – keyboards, synthesisers; Kenny Grohowski – drums; Scott Weinberger – percussion	none
