= Plays Well with Others (Phil Collins album) =

2018 box set

Box set by Phil Collins
- Released: 28 September 2018
- Recorded: 1969–2011
- Label: Atlantic/WEA

Phil Collins chronology
The Singles (2016)	Plays Well with Others (2018)	Other Sides (2019)

Professional ratings
Review scores
Source	Rating
AllMusic	4.5/5 stars

Plays Well with Others is a box set by the English singer and drummer Phil Collins, released in 2018. The first three discs chronicle Collins' contributions to albums by various musicians, while the fourth disc features live performances.

== Track listing ==
=== Disc one: 1969–1982 ===
No.	Title	Writer(s)	Artist/record	Length
1.	"Guide Me, Orion"	Ken Howard, Alan Blaikley	Flaming Youth — Ark 2 (1969)	03:18
2.	"Knights" (reprise)	Banks	Peter Banks — Two Sides of Peter Banks (1973)	02:14
3.	"Don't You Feel It?"	Wallace	Eugene Wallace — Book of Fool (1974)	04:14
4.	"I Can't Remember, but Yes"	Argent	Argent — Counterpoints (1975)	03:07
5.	"Over Fire Island"	Eno	Brian Eno — Another Green World (1975)	01:51
6.	"Savannah Woman"	Bolin, Jeff Cook	Tommy Bolin — Teaser (1975)	02:46
7.	"Pablo Picasso"	Jonathan Richman	John Cale — Helen of Troy (1975)	03:23
8.	"Nuclear Burn"	Collins, John Goodsall, Robin Lumley, Percy Jones	Brand X — Unorthodox Behaviour (1976)	06:22
9.	"No One Receiving"	Eno	Brian Eno — Before and After Science (1977)	03:50
10.	"Home"	Argent	Rod Argent — Moving Home (1978)	04:22
11.	"M386"	Eno	Brian Eno — Music for Films (1978)	02:51
12.	"…And So to F…"	Collins	Brand X — Product (1979)	06:22
13.	"North Star"	Fripp, Daryl Hall, Joanna Walton	Robert Fripp — Exposure (1979)	03:08
14.	"Sweet Little Mystery"	Martyn	John Martyn — Grace and Danger (1980)	05:26
15.	"Intruder"	Gabriel	Peter Gabriel — Peter Gabriel (1980)	04:54
16.	"I Know There's Something Going On"	Russ Ballard	Frida — Something's Going On (1982)	05:29
17.	"Pledge Pin"	Plant, Robbie Blunt	Robert Plant — Pictures at Eleven (1982)	04:02
18.	"Lead Me to the Water"	Brooker	Gary Brooker — Lead Me to the Water (1982)	04:23

=== Disc two: 1982–1991 ===
No.	Title	Writer(s)	Artist/record	Length
1.	"In the Mood"	Plant, Blunt, Paul Martinez	Robert Plant — The Principle of Moments (1983)	05:22
2.	"Island Dreamer"	Jan Hammer, Al DiMeola	Al Di Meola — Scenario (1983)	04:05
3.	"Puss 'n Boots"	Ant, Marco Pirroni	Adam Ant — Strip (1983)	04:02
4.	"Walking on the Chinese Wall"	Billie Hughes, Roxanne Seeman	Philip Bailey — Chinese Wall (1984)	05:08
5.	"Do They Know It's Christmas?"	Bob Geldof, Midge Ure	Band Aid — non-album single (1984)	03:51
6.	"Just Like a Prisoner"	Clapton	Eric Clapton — Behind the Sun (1985)	05:30
7.	"Because of You"	Bailey, Collins, George Duke, Nathan East, Lorelei McBroom, Ray Parker Jr.	Philip Bailey — Inside Out (1986)	04:32
8.	"Watching the World"	John Lang, Richard Page, Steve George	Chaka Khan — Destiny (1986)	04:44
9.	"No One Is to Blame" (Phil Collins' version)	Jones	Howard Jones — Action Replay (1986)	04:14
10.	"If Leaving Me Is Easy"	Collins	The Isley Brothers — Masterpiece (1985)	06:32
11.	"Angry"	McCartney, Eric Stewart	Paul McCartney — Press to Play (1986)	03:37
12.	"Loco in Acapulco"	Collins, Lamont Dozier	Four Tops — Buster (1988)	04:12
13.	"Walking on Air"	Bishop	Stephen Bishop — Bowling in Paris (1989)	03:27
14.	"Hall Light"	Bishop	Stephen Bishop — Bowling in Paris (1989)	04:50
15.	"Woman in Chains"	Roland Orzabal	Tears for Fears — The Seeds of Love (1989)	06:30
16.	"Burn Down the Mission"	Elton John, Bernie Taupin	Phil Collins — Two Rooms: Celebrating the Songs of Elton John & Bernie Taupin (1991)	06:13

=== Disc three: 1991–2011 ===
No.	Title	Writer(s)	Artist/record	Length
1.	"No Son of Mine"	Tony Banks, Collins, Mike Rutherford	Genesis — We Can't Dance (1991)	06:39
2.	"Could've Been Me"	Martyn	John Martyn — Couldn't Love You More (1992)	03:55
3.	"Hero"	Collins, Crosby	David Crosby — Thousand Roads (1993)	04:40
4.	"Ways to Cry"	Martyn	John Martyn — No Little Boy (1993)	04:43
5.	"I've Been Trying"	Curtis Mayfield	Phil Collins — A Tribute to Curtis Mayfield (1994)	05:02
6.	"Do Nothing till You Hear from Me"	Duke Ellington, Bob Russell	Quincy Jones — Q's Jook Joint (1995)	03:58
7.	"Why Can't It Wait 'Til Morning"	Collins	Fourplay — Elixir (1995)	05:18
8.	"Suzanne"	Martyn	John Martyn — And (1996)	03:53
9.	"Looking for an Angel"	Collins	Laura Pausini — La mia risposta (1998)	04:13
10.	"Golden Slumbers"/"Carry That Weight"/"The End"	Lennon, McCartney	George Martin — In My Life (1998)	05:39
11.	"In the Air Tonite"	Lil' Kim, Collins	Lil' Kim feat. Phil Collins — Urban Renewal (2001)	04:21
12.	"Welcome"	Collins	Phil Collins — Brother Bear (2003)	03:36
13.	"Can't Turn Back the Years"	Collins	John Martyn — Heaven and Earth (2011)	04:20

=== Disc four: Live 1981–2002 ===
No.	Title	Writer(s)	Artist	Length
1.	"In the Air Tonight" (live at The Secret Policeman's Other Ball, 1981)	Collins	Phil Collins	05:05
2.	"While My Guitar Gently Weeps" (live at the Prince's Trust concert, 1987)	Harrison	George Harrison	05:02
3.	"You Win Again" (live at the Prince's Trust concert, 1988)	Barry Gibb, Robin Gibb, Maurice Gibb	Bee Gees	03:28
4.	"There'll Be Some Changes Made" (live at the Montreux Jazz Festival 1996)	William Benton Overstreet, Billy Higgins	Phil Collins Big Band & Tony Bennett	03:13
5.	"Stormy Weather" (live at the Montreux Jazz Festival 1996)	Harold Arlen, Ted Koehler	Phil Collins & Quincy Jones	03:49
6.	"Chips and Salsa" (From the album A Hot Night in Paris, 1999)	Gerald Albright	The Phil Collins Big Band	05:14
7.	"Birdland" (From the DVD A Salute To Buddy Rich, featuring Phil Collins, Dennis Chambers & Steve Smith, 1999)	Joe Zawinul	Phil Collins with the Buddy Rich Big Band	07:13
8.	"Pick Up the Pieces" (live at the Montreux Jazz Festival 1998)	Roger Ball, Molly Duncan, Alan Gorrie, Onnie McIntyre, Hamish Stuart, Robbie McIntosh	The Phil Collins Big Band	21:13
9.	"Layla" (live at Party at the Palace, 3 June 2002)	Clapton, Jim Gordon	Eric Clapton	06:19
10.	"Why" (live at Party at the Palace, 3 June 2002)	Lennox	Annie Lennox	05:31
11.	"(Everything I Do) I Do It for You" (live at Party at the Palace, 3 June 2002)	Adams, Michael Kamen, Robert John "Mutt" Lange	Bryan Adams	04:16
12.	"With a Little Help from My Friends" (live at Party at the Palace, 3 June 2002)	Lennon, McCartney	Joe Cocker	05:50

== Charts ==
2018 weekly chart performance for Plays Well with Others
Chart (2018)	Peak position
German Albums (Offizielle Top 100)	17
Hungarian Albums (MAHASZ)	26
Swiss Albums (Schweizer Hitparade)	47

2024 weekly chart performance for Plays Well with Others
Chart (2024)	Peak position
Canadian Albums (Billboard)	82
