= Peter and the Wolf (1975 rock album) =

Studio album by Jack Lancaster and Robin Lumley
- Released: 1975
- Studio: Trident, London
- Genre: Progressive rock
- Length: 38:26
- Label: RSO
- Producer: Dennis Mackay, Jack Lancaster, Robin Lumley

Jack Lancaster and Robin Lumley chronology
Peter and the Wolf (1975)	Marscape (1976)

Peter and the Wolf is an album adapting Sergei Prokofiev's Peter and the Wolf by Jack Lancaster and Robin Lumley released in 1975. It features a rock arrangement of Prokofiev's music. Performers on the album include Jack Lancaster, Robin Lumley, Gary Brooker, Bill Bruford, Phil Collins, Julie Tippett, Stephane Grappelli, Jon Hiseman, Brian Eno, Alvin Lee, Gary Moore, Cozy Powell, Manfred Mann, Keith Tippett, Viv Stanshall, and the English Chorale. This album is notable for featuring several musicians from Brand X, who would release their debut album the following year.

== Track listing ==
=== Side One ===
1. "Introduction" – 1:05
2. "Peter's Theme" – 2:10
3. "Bird and Peter" – 0:38
4. "Duck Theme"" – 1:00
5. "Pond" – 0:46
6. "Duck and Bird" – 2:11
7. "Cat Dance" – 2:37
8. "Cat and Duck" – 1:32
9. "Grandfather" – 3:04
10. "Cat" – 0:34
11. "Wolf" – 0:46
12. "Wolf and Duck" – 3:46

=== Side Two ===
1. "Threnody For A Duck" – 1:51
2. "Wolf Stalks" – 0:57
3. "Cat In Tree" – 2:13
4. "Peter's Chase" – 1:45
5. "Capture of Wolf" – 1:27
6. "Hunters" – 0:58
7. "Rock and Roll Celebration" – 2:38
8. "Duck Escape" – 1:11
9. "Final Theme" – 5:07

== Credits ==
- Jack Lancaster — Lyricon, saxophones, clarinet, flute, violin
- Stéphane Grappelli — Violin
- Henry Lowther — Violin
- Robin Lumley — Electric piano, acoustic piano, clavinet, string synthesizer, synthesizer
- Brian Eno — Synthesizer
- Manfred Mann — Synthesizer
- Gary Brooker — Synthesizer
- Keith Tippett — Piano
- Gary Moore — Acoustic & electric guitars
- John Goodsall — Guitar
- Alvin Lee — Guitar
- Chris Spedding — Guitar
- Pete Haywood — Steel Guitar
- Percy Jones — Bass
- Andy Pyle — Bass
- Dave Marquee — bass
- Bill Bruford — Drums, snare
- Phil Collins — Drums, vibraphone, percussions
- Cozy Powell — Drums, cymbal
- Jon Hiseman — Snare drum
- Erika Michaelenko — Chimes, choir
- Julie Tippett — Vocal
- Bernie Frost — Vocal, choir
- Bob Sargeant — Choir
- The English Chorale — Choir
- Viv Stanshall — Narrator
