= Livestock (Brand X album) =

Live album by Brand X
- Released: 18 November 1977
- Recorded: September 1976 at Ronnie Scott's Jazz Club, London and Hammersmith Odeon; 23 April and 5 August 1977 at the Marquee Club, London and Hammersmith Odeon
- Genre: Jazz fusion
- Length: 41:11
- Labels: Charisma (UK, LP); Passport (US, LP); Caroline Blue Plate (CD)
- Producer: Brand X

Brand X chronology
Moroccan Roll (1977)	Livestock (1977)	Masques (1978)

Professional ratings
Review scores
Source	Rating
Allmusic	2.5/5 stars

Livestock is a live album by British jazz fusion group Brand X released in 1977. The album has five tracks. The opening and closing tracks feature drummer Kenwood Dennard, while the three tracks in between were recorded with his predecessor Phil Collins. The recordings on the album come from Brand X's 1977 European and North American tour.

== Track listing ==
Side one
No.	Title	Writer(s)	Recording venue and date	Length
1.	"Nightmare Patrol"	John Goodsall, Kenwood Dennard	Hammersmith Odeon, 5 August 1977	7:40
2.	"-Ish"	Goodsall, Robin Lumley, Percy Jones, Morris Pert, Phil Collins	Ronnie Scott's Jazz Club, September 1976	8:11
3.	"Euthanasia Waltz"	Goodsall, Jones, Lumley, Collins	Marquee Club, 23 April 1977	5:12

Side two
No.	Title	Writer(s)	Recording venue and date	Length
4.	"Isis Mourning (Part 1 & 2)"	Goodsall, Jones, Lumley, Pert, Collins	Ronnie Scott's Jazz Club, September 1976	9:58
5.	"Malaga Virgen"	Jones	Hammersmith Odeon, 5 August 1977	8:45
Total length:				41:11

== X-CERPTS ==
A 12" record titled X-CERPTS: 3 From Livestock + 1 was released including edited versions of three tracks from Livestock and a previously unreleased studio track.

Side one
No.	Title	Writer(s)	Recording venue and date	Length
1.	"Nightmare Patrol"	Goodsall, Dennard	Hammersmith Odeon, 5 August 1977	3:17
2.	"Genocide of the Straights" (previously unreleased)	Goodsall, Jones, Lumley, Pert, Collins		2:50

Side two
No.	Title	Writer(s)	Recording venue and date	Length
3.	"Euthanasia Waltz"	Goodsall, Jones, Lumley, Collins	Marquee Club, 23 April 1977	3:25
4.	"Malaga Virgen"	Jones	Hammersmith Odeon, 5 August 1977	3:20
Total length:				12:52

== Personnel ==
- John Goodsall – guitars
- Robin Lumley – keyboards
- Percy Jones – bass
- Kenwood Dennard – drums (1, 5)
- Phil Collins – drums (2–4)
- Morris Pert – percussion

=== Technical ===
- Mixed at Trident Studios, London, August 1977
- Engineered by Jerry Smith
- Assistant engineers – John Brand, Steve Short, Neil Ross
- Sleeve design and photos by Hipgnosis
- Equipment – Steve Hall and Pete Donovan
- Management – Tony Smith, Hit & Run Music, Brian Murray Smith, Alex Sim

== Notes ==
- "Nightmare Patrol", "Ish", and "Isis Mourning" are all unique tracks not found on any other Brand X album. "Malaga Virgen" and "Euthanasia Waltz" are found on the previous two studio albums.
