= Masques (Brand X album) =

Studio album by Brand X
- Released: 8 September 1978
- Recorded: May–June 1978
- Studios: Trident Studios, London
- Genre: Instrumental jazz fusion
- Length: 49:06
- Label: Charisma
- Producer: Robin Lumley

Brand X chronology
Livestock (1977)	Masques (1978)	Product (1979)

Professional ratings
Review scores
Source	Rating
Allmusic	3/5 stars

Masques is the third studio album and fourth overall album by the British jazz fusion group Brand X. This was the band's first studio recording without drummer Phil Collins, while keyboardist Robin Lumley produced but did not play on the album. The rear of the album cover has a photo of the crowd from the Knebworth Festival, 1978 — a bill that included both Brand X and Genesis, Collins' other band.

== Track listing ==
Side one
No.	Title	Writer(s)	Length
1.	"The Poke"	John Goodsall	5:10
2.	"Masques"	Percy Jones, J. Peter Robinson	3:16
3.	"Black Moon"	Morris Pert	4:48
4.	"Deadly Nightshade"	Pert	11:22

Side two
No.	Title	Writer(s)	Length
5.	"Earth Dance"	Pert	6:06
6.	"Access to Data"	Goodsall	8:00
7.	"The Ghost of Mayfield Lodge"	Jones	10:17
Total length:			49:06

== Personnel ==
Brand X

- John Goodsall – guitars
- J. Peter Robinson – keyboards
- Percy Jones – bass
- Chuck Burgi – drums
- Morris Pert – percussion, Fender Piano (3)

Production

- Produced by Robin Lumley
- Engineered by Stephen W. Tayler
- Assistant engineers – Colin Green, Rene Ruocco, Mike Donegani
- Mastered by Jack Skinner at Sterling Sound, NY
- Equipment – Pete Donovan, Steve Jones, Dave Powell
- Management – Hit & Run Music
- Sleeve design, front photo – Chris Kutschera
- Back cover – Hag
- Layout – A.D. Design

== Notes ==
- "The Ghost of Mayfield Lodge" is based on a true story (see this page for more info) about a carriage house where Percy Jones was staying which was said to be haunted
- This album is the first album on which Jones played the fretless Wal bass, which became his trademark sound
