= Is There Anything About? =

Studio album by Brand X
- Released: September 1982
- Recorded: Startling Studios, Ascot, UK, April 1979, except track 5, "Is There Anything About", recorded mid 1970s
- Genre: Jazz fusion
- Length: 33:37
- Label: CBS
- Producer: Robin Lumley, Brand X

Brand X chronology
Do They Hurt? (1980)	Is There Anything About? (1982)	X-Communication (1992)

Professional ratings
Review scores
Source	Rating
AllMusic	3/5 stars

Is There Anything About? is the sixth studio album by the British jazz fusion group Brand X. It is the last album to feature longstanding members Robin Lumley and Phil Collins. It was assembled from outtakes from the 1979 Product and Do They Hurt? sessions. These sessions had produced around twenty tracks. Bassist Percy Jones first heard about the album after it was released, and was unsatisfied with the results. "Modern, Noisy and Effective" is actually the backing track to "Soho" from Product with a new keyboard line overdubbed on it. "A Longer April" is an extended version of "April" from Product, with a bit of synth noise added in the middle. "TMIU-ATGA" is taken from an old cassette tape running in the studio while the band were improvising; the title is an acronym for 'They Make It Up- As They Go Along'.

== Background and recording ==
This album is outtakes from the 1979 Product and Do They Hurt? sessions. "A Longer April" is a re-engineered version of "April" from Product. "Modern, Noisy, and Effective" is a recycling of the backing track of "Soho" from Product; the liner notes for Product include the following credit for "Soho": "Eng: P. Collins (Modern, Noisy, and Effective)". However, this phrase first appears in Three Dates with Genesis, a 1978 BBC documentary on Genesis; the narrator describes the scene in which the stage has been torn down and all the equipment loaded into trucks thus: "Like the rock band they service, the trucks are noisy, modern, and effective; at 2:30 on a Friday morning, they leave Mannheim to drive halfway across Europe to the Dutch border."

== Track listing ==
=== LP version ===
Side one

1. "Ipanaemia" (John Goodsall) – 4:30
2. "A Longer April" (John Giblin) – 7:00
3. "Modern, Noisy and Effective" (Goodsall, Robin Lumley, Stephen Short) – 3:56

Side two

4. "Swan Song" (Phil Collins, Giblin, Lumley, Short) – 5:37
5. "Is There Anything About?" (Collins, Goodsall, Percy Jones) – 7:53
6. "TMIU-ATGA" (Giblin, Lumley, J. Peter Robinson) – 5:09

=== CD version ===
1. "Ipanemia" (Goodsall) – 4:13
2. "A Longer April" (Giblin) – 7:23
3. "TMIU-ATGA" (Giblin, Lumley, Robinson) – 5:09
4. "Swan Song" (Collins, Giblin, Lumley, Short) – 5:37
5. "Is There Anything About?" (Collins, Goodsall, Jones) – 7:53
6. "Modern, Noisy and Effective" (Goodsall, Lumley, Short) – 3:58

== Personnel ==
Brand X

- Robin Lumley – keyboards (1–5), vocals (4)
- J. Peter Robinson – keyboards (6)
- John Goodsall – guitars
- John Giblin – bass (1–4, 6), vocals (4)
- Percy Jones – bass (5)
- Phil Collins – drums, percussion

Additional personnel

- Raphael Ravenscroft – saxophone (2)
- Steve Short – Syndrums (4), vocals (4)
- Ed Carson – handclaps (3)

Production

- Robin Lumley – producer, remixing
- Steve Short – producer, engineer, remixing
- Colin Green – engineer
- Neil Kernon – engineer
- Craig Milliner – engineer
- Ray Staff – mastering
- Bill Smith – sleeve design
- Andrew Douglas – photography

== Charts ==
Year	Chart	Position
1982	UK Album Chart	93
