= Invisible Men =

Studio album by Anthony Phillips
- Released: 24 October 1983 (US); 13 April 1984 (UK)
- Recorded: April–September, October–December 1982
- Studios: Englewood Studios, Clapham, London and Atmosphere Studios, central London
- Genres: Progressive rock electronic music Synthpop
- Labels: Passport Records (US); Street Tunes (UK)
- Producers: Trevor Vallis; Anthony Phillips; Richard Scott

Anthony Phillips chronology
Private Parts and Pieces III: Antiques (1982)	Invisible Men (1983)	Private Parts and Pieces IV: A Catch at the Tables (1984)

Alternative cover
- Original UK cover.

Professional ratings
Review scores
Source	Rating
Allmusic	2.5/5 stars

Invisible Men is the eighth studio album by English multi-instrumentalist and composer Anthony Phillips. It was released in October 1983 by Passport Records in the United States and in April 1984 by Street Tunes in the United Kingdom. After he released his Private Parts & Pieces III: Antiques, the third instalment in his generic album series, Phillips started work on his next full studio album. Phillips was pressured by his US label Passport Records to deliver more radio friendly songs, and produced Invisible Men as a collaborative effort with musician and songwriter Richard Scott.

Phillips would not release another complete and arranged album of solo material until Slow Dance (1990).

== Background and recording ==
In early 1982, Phillips released Private Parts & Pieces III: Antiques, the third instalment in his generic album series containing incomplete compositions, demos, and out-takes. For his next release Phillips committed to a full, standard album, his first since 1984 (1981). At this point in his career, Phillips was pressured by management at his record label, the independent US-based Passport Records, to deliver more commercial and radio friendly songs. Also in early 1982, he had bought a house in Clapham, south London and has since called Invisible Men his "mortgage album". He set up studio in his home which he named Englewood Studios, and did additional recording in Atmosphere Studios in central London. To help him with the project, Phillips invited musician and songwriter Richard Scott to assist in its production. In a later interview, Phillips acknowledged Scott's confidence and enthusiasm, but noted that this would sometimes result in Phillips being pushed into musical areas where he was uneasy, perhaps due to Scott's inexperience, having recently graduated from university and wanting to make a career out of music. When it came to the vocals, Phillips was inspired to take them on himself as former Genesis band mates Mike Rutherford and Tony Banks had done vocals on their solo albums, and that he was unable to find someone suitable. Phillips had used different guest singers on Sides (1979), but felt that it did not work as well as he had expected. Feeling his vocals were inadequate, Phillips took singing lessons from John Owen Edwards, who had worked with him on a musical project and had also coached Rutherford.

After the backing tracks and rough vocals had been put down for about five songs, Phillips presented his work to his manager Tony Smith and recalled that he was "extremely impressed". This was when Phillips was enthusiastic about the album until it became increasingly difficult for him to maintain such a level of interest. During recording at Atmosphere Studios, session drummers were brought in to play parts originally programmed on a drum machine as well as singers for additional vocals. Phillips wrote about this period: "The money was flowing out. It wasn't a wholly happy time." In addition, pressure was placed upon him to change his image and to present the album under the name Anthony Phillips Band, something with which he did not agree.

Invisible Men was cut by Ian Cooper at Townhouse Studios in London. Phillips encountered problems in finalising the album's release in the US as Passport rejected two cuts that Cooper had prepared, coupled with the opinion that none of the songs were suitable for a single. After the second cut was rejected, Phillips recalled that Cooper "was a bit beside himself - he just didn't know what else to do", and received notes from the label's engineer in New York with suggestions to improve it, with which Phillips expressed some disagreement. Following a three month delay, the label suggested a new mix but realised it would cost additional money, so they agreed to release the album.

== Songs ==
"Exocet" is a political song inspired by the Falklands War between Argentina and the United Kingdom, which took place during the recording of the album. In one incident in the conflict, an Exocet missile struck a British warship and killed 20 crew members. One of Phillips's musician friends, Argentinian guitarist Enrique Berro Garcia, had to leave the United Kingdom. The end of the song includes a segment of a news report of the war, which was originally a recording error but Phillips decided to keep it. Upon finishing the album, management of Street Tunes Records, the UK label that released it in the country, deemed "Exocet" too political and ordered its removal. It was replaced with "It's Not Easy". The track "The Women Were Watching" also concerns the Falklands War.

== Release ==
Invisible Men was released in the United Kingdom on 13 April 1984 on Street Tunes, an independent label. Phillips was pleased with the label's enthusiasm towards the album. A 12-inch single of "Sally" was released which Phillips believed was not the best track for a single. The 1996 Blueprint reissue states that its track order was rearranged to the originally intended order.

On 13 October 2017 Esoteric Recordings (a Cherry Red Records label) released a 2-disc deluxe edition of the album. Disc 1 contains a new remaster of the original stereo mix of the album. Disc 2 contains 16 previously unreleased demos and contemporaneous material. The deluxe edition also includes an illustrated booklet with a new essay by Jonathan Dann.

== Track listing ==
Side one

1. "Sally" (Phillips) - 3:53 / vocal: Phillips
2. "Golden Bodies" (Phillips, Scott) - 3:16 / vocal: Phillips
3. "Going for Broke" (Phillips, Scott) - 3:30 / vocal: Scott
4. "Exocet" (Phillips, Scott) - 3:19 / vocal: Phillips (US version) / "It's Not Easy" (Phillips) - 4:47 / vocal: Phillips (UK version)
5. "Love in a Hot Air Balloon" (Phillips, Scott) - 3:42 / vocal: Phillips
6. "Traces" (Phillips, Scott) - 4:49 / vocal: Phillips

Side two

1. "I Want Your Heart" (Phillips, Scott) - 3:51 / vocal: Scott
2. "Falling for Love" (Phillips, Scott) - 3:33 / vocal: Scott
3. "Guru" (Phillips) - 4:42 / vocal: Phillips
4. "The Women Were Watching" (Phillips, Scott) - 4:46 / vocal: Phillips
5. "My Time Has Come" (Phillips) - 4:46 / vocal: Phillips

=== 2017 reissue ===
==== CD One Extra Tracks ====
12. "It's Not Easy"
13. "Trail of Tears"
14. "The Ballad of Penlee" / vocal: Scott
15. "Alex" (Atmosphere Studios version)

==== CD Two ====
1. "Gimme Love" / vocal: Scott
2. "Falling for Love" (Alternate Version)
3. "My Time Has Come" (Instrumental Mix)
4. "Golden Bodies" (Demo) / vocal: Phillips
5. "Mysterious Constitution of Comets"
6. "She's Gone"
7. "Graciella"
8. "Over and Over Again"
9. "Tonight"
10. "Alien" / vocal: Scott
11. "Refugee from Love" / vocal: Scott
12. "Something Blue" / vocal: Scott
13. "Holding You Again"
14. "Darling"
15. "Shadow in the Desert"
16. "Finale (Atmosphere Studios Version)"

== Personnel ==
Credits adapted from the album's 1984 release.

Musicians

- Anthony Phillips (a.k.a. "Vic Stench" and "The Vicar") – vocals, Fender Stratocaster, Polymoog synthesiser, bass guitar, ARP 2600 synthesiser, organ, piano, Colorama electric guitar, Yari classical guitar, Roland Jupiter-8 keyboard, Rickenbacker electric 12-string guitar, Mellotron, editing block, tubular bells, Fender Rhodes guitar, Les Paul guitar, church organ, bass, contrabass, camp bass
- Richard Scott – Roland TR-808 keyboard, vocals, scamp, Stratocaster, vocoder
- Paul Robinson – drums
- Bimbo Acock – saxes
- Morris Pert – tambourine, kalimba
- Joji Hirota – marimbas, wood blocks, tambourine, timpani, shakers, jawbone, cabasa, bell tree
- Martin Robertson – soprano saxophone
- Uti Koofreh – backing vocals
- Jeff Dunne – drums
- Martin Drover – trumpet, flugelhorn solo
- Malcolm Griffiths – trombone
- "Ralph Bernascone" – "sarrusaphone"
- Jonathan Snowden – piccolo
- Jack Emblow – accordion on "Darling"
- Kitty Grant – backing vocals on "Gimme Love" and "Refugee From Love"

Production

- Anthony Phillips – production
- Richard Scott – production
- Trevor Vallis – production
- Ian Cooper – cutting at Townhouse Studios, London
- Elliot Brothers, C and M Audio, Mike Rutherford, Andrew Latimer, Lob Tumsey, Dave Hill, Robin Clarke – equipment thanks
- Simon Heyworth – remastering
