= Do They Hurt? =

Studio album by Brand X
- Released: 18 April 1980
- Recorded: April 1979
- Studio: Startling Studios (Ascot, UK); Farmyard Studios (Buckinghamshire, UK).
- Genre: Jazz fusion
- Length: 39:48
- Label: Charisma (UK); Passport (USA)
- Producer: Brand X, Neil Kernon

Brand X chronology
Product (1979)	Do They Hurt? (1980)	Is There Anything About? (1982)

Professional ratings
Review scores
Source	Rating
Allmusic	2/5 stars

Do They Hurt? is the fifth studio album and sixth overall album by the British jazz fusion group Brand X, released in 1980. The album was recorded simultaneously with the band's 1979 album Product. The album's sleeve notes were written by Michael Palin.

== Track listing ==
=== Side one ===
1. "Noddy Goes to Sweden" (Jones) – 4:30
2. "Voidarama" (Goodsall) – 4:21
3. "Act of Will" (Goodsall) – 4:43
4. "Fragile" (Jones, Robinson) – 5:26

=== Side two ===
5. "Cambodia" (Goodsall) – 4:31
6. "Triumphant Limp" (Goodsall, Giblin, Lumley, Collins) – 7:34
7. "D.M.Z." (Jones) – 8:39

== Personnel ==
- J. Peter Robinson – keyboards (1–5, 7), gong (5, 6), synthesizers (6)
- Robin Lumley – acoustic piano (2), keyboards (6)
- John Goodsall – guitars (2–7), vocals (3)
- Percy Jones – bass (1, 3, 4, 5, 7), vocals (1)
- John Giblin – bass (2, 6)
- Mike Clark – drums (1, 3, 4, 5, 7)
- Phil Collins – drums (2, 6)
- Morris Pert – percussion (1, 4)

=== Production ===
- Brand X – producers
- Neil Kernon – producer, engineer (1–5, 7)
- Richard Austen – engineer (6)
- Colin Green – engineer (6)
- Hipgnosis – cover design, photography
- Richard Manning – coloring

== Notes ==
- Robin Lumley (2002): "To this day I can proudly count Michael Palin and Terry Jones as good pals! I got Mike to do the sleeve notes on Do They Hurt? (which is itself a line from Holy Grail (witch sequence)... He wanted 25 pence for writing the notes... Charisma didn't pay him so he threatened to sue! (a joke of course)".
- "Act of Will" is sung through a vocoder. John Goodsall himself said, in a private e-mail, that there were never any written lyrics. Various attempts have been made to puzzle out what he is saying, but the words are likely similar to "Masoko Tanga" by The Police and are not always words.
