= Hit and Run Productions =

Movie production house

- Industry: Film
- Headquarters: United Kingdom
- Products: Motion pictures

Hit and Run Productions is a movie production house in the United Kingdom founded by Tony Smith and Hilary Shor. It is an extension of Hit & Run Music Publishing.

== Filmography ==
- Phil Collins: No Jacket Required (1985) (television) - Executive Producer (Smith only)
- Mike + The Mechanics: A Closer Look (1989) (video) - Executive Producer (Smith only)
- Genesis: A History (1990) Hit and Run Productions
- Beautopia (1998) (motion picture) - Executive Producers
- Eye of the Beholder (1999) (motion picture) - Producers
- Children of Men (2006) (motion picture) - Producers
- The Possibility of Hope (2007) (video documentary) - Executive Producers
- Black Oasis (2008) - (motion picture) - Producers
