= Music for Montserrat =

Video by Various Artists
- Released: January 9, 1998
- Recorded: 15 September 1997, Royal Albert Hall, London
- Venue: Royal Albert Hall
- Genres: Pop, Rock
- Label: Image Entertainment
- Producer: George Martin

Music for Montserrat was a benefit concert held on 15 September 1997 at the Royal Albert Hall. The event was organised by Sir George Martin, former producer for the Beatles and founder of Associated Independent Recording, to raise funds for the Caribbean island of Montserrat after a major volcanic eruption by the Soufrière Hills volcano earlier that year.

The concert was arranged and produced by Martin, and starred many iconic British and American rock musicians such as Phil Collins, Ray Cooper, Carl Perkins, Jimmy Buffett, Mark Knopfler, Sting, Elton John, Eric Clapton, Paul McCartney, Midge Ure, Arrow and many more, all of whom had once recorded or produced on the island. A DVD was released with the most famous songs from the concert, such as "Your Song", "Layla", "Brothers in Arms", "Blue Suede Shoes", "Money for Nothing", "Yesterday", "Hey Jude", and "Message in a Bottle".

Proceeds from ticket sales and DVD copies went towards restoration and support of the island. The concert raised £1.5 million. Proceeds from the show and DVD were used for immediate relief and also helped fund the building of a new cultural centre in Montserrat. On its completion in 2006, George Martin gifted the centre to the local community; it is still in operation today.

== Background ==
The island of Montserrat is a British Overseas Territory, nicknamed the "Emerald Isle of the Caribbean" in British culture due to its resemblance to coastal areas of Ireland and history of Irish migration.

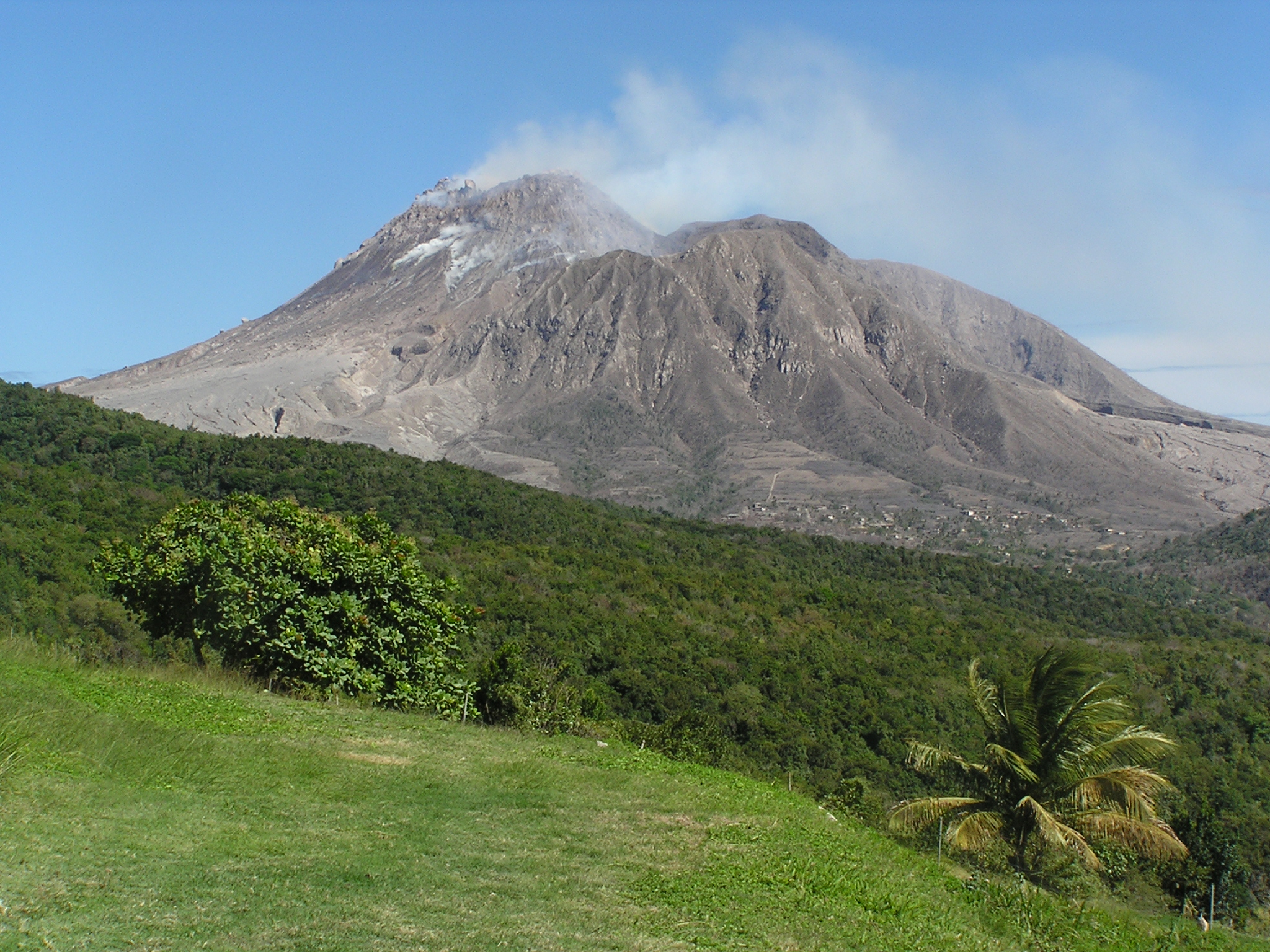
Soufrière Hills volcano

In July 1979, George Martin's AIR Studios built 'AIR Montserrat', a recording studio situated on the west side of the island. The studio became a cultural attraction for the island and created a culture of rock and pop music, offering the technical facilities of its London counterpart studio, with the alternative of an exotic location for international bands. American country rock musician Jimmy Buffett named his album, Volcano, after the Soufrière Hills volcano at which the studio stood at the base of.

From the period from 1979 to 1989, over 70 albums were recorded in the studio, including Hot Hot Hot, Synchronicity and Brothers in Arms.

In September 1989, tropical cyclone Hurricane Hugo travelled across the north-eastern Caribbean region, affecting approximately 2 million people. By the time the storm hit the island it was classified as a Category 4 hurricane, was Montserrat's costliest hurricane on record, dismantling the power infrastructure of the island and destroying ninety percent of the buildings and structures. Amongst the damage done to the island's economy and structures, AIR studios Montserrat experienced extensive structural damage and most recording equipment was destroyed. With the closure of this facility, the tourism economy on the island was effectively wiped out

In referencing the forced closure of the studio, Martin said:

"After ten great years of recording there the music business had changed...the moguls running the business no longer wanted their artists miles away, outside their control." "That coincided with the devastation caused by the hurricane and sadly the studios had to close. The people of Montserrat are still very proud of the work that was done at AIR Studios, it's only fitting that we continue and support music development."

In July 1995, the once dormant Soufrière Hills volcano became active and erupted after a three-year period of heightened seismic activity beneath the island. The eruption from the volcano destroyed most of the public infrastructure around the island, including its airport and shipping facilities, necessitating an evacuation of the southern part of the island. Following the devastation caused by the two years of volcanic activity, and given his past connection with the island and community, Martin began efforts to raise funds in order to support the island.

== Organisation ==
In the aftermath of the Soufrière Hills disaster, George Martin began to plan out means of which to raise funds for the Montserratian community, with the first major event being the 'Music for Montserrat' concert. Up until his death in 2016, Martin continued to devote resources towards the support of Montserrat and its community.

The concert was organised to be held at London's Royal Albert Hall, under the title of "Music for Montserrat, in aid of the Montserrat Foundation". According to Sir George Martin and Royal Albert Hall, Martin organised all musicians playing at the benefit concert to perform for free.

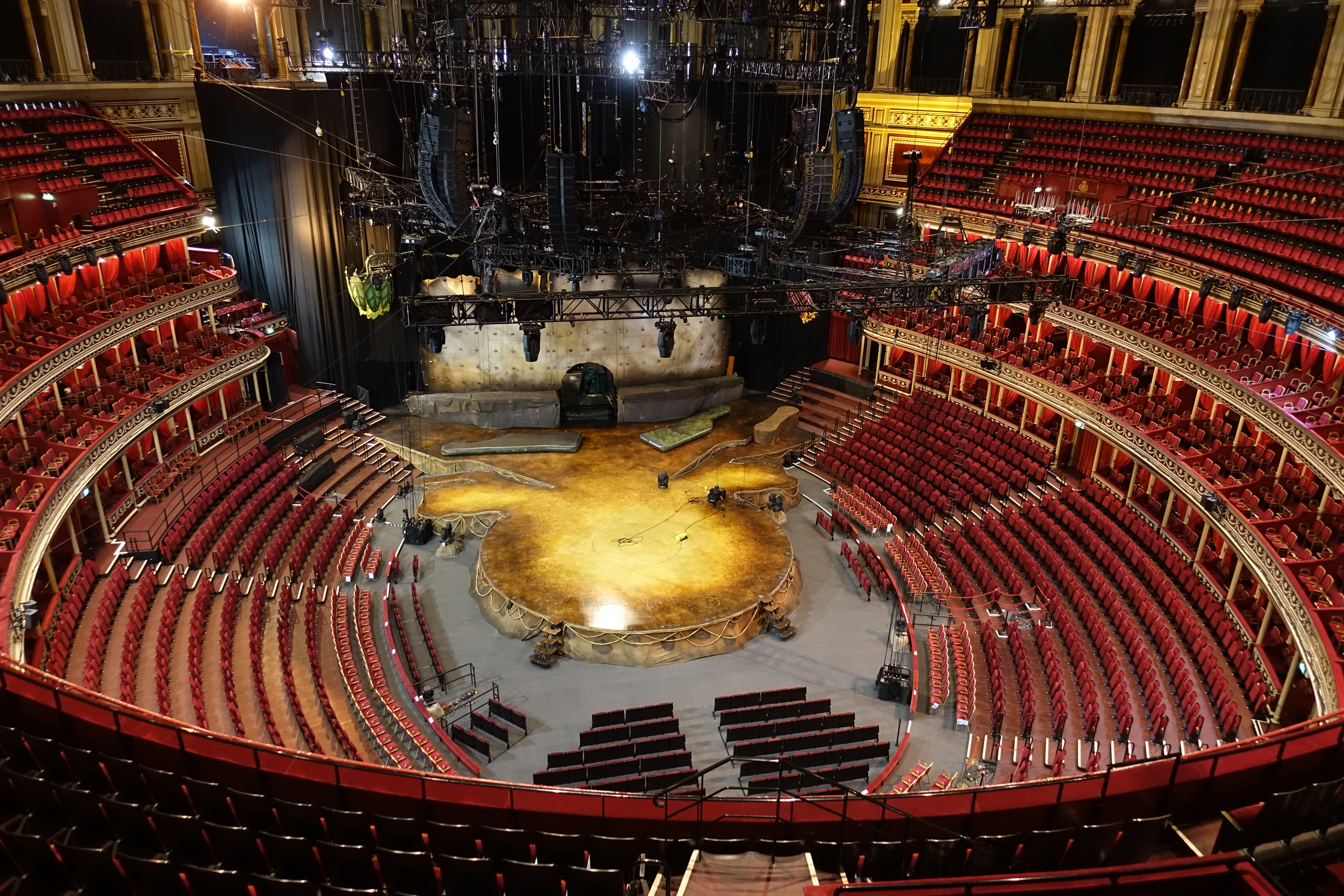
Royal Albert Hall

4,500 tickets were sold for the event (Royal Albert Hall has a total audience capacity of 5,900), with all tickets sold out within one and half hours of the box office initial opening. Ticket pricing was between £25, £40 and £60.

Supporting the performing artists was a band and choir, both organised by Martin:

=== Band ===
- Robbie McIntosh – guitar
- Phil Palmer – guitar
- Long John Gilding (John Giblin) – bass guitar
- Ian Thomas – drums
- Paul "Wix" Wickens – keyboards
- Ray Cooper - Percussion

=== Choir ===
- London Community Gospel Choir

== List of performances ==
1. Introduction
2. Blue Suede Shoes – Carl Perkins (Note: This was the last major live performance of Carl Perkins; he died just over four months later on 19 January 1998.)
3. Dancing with Tears in My Eyes – Midge Ure*
4. Vienna – Midge Ure *
5. In the Air Tonight – Phil Collins *
6. Take Me Home – Phil Collins
7. Hot Hot Hot – Arrow & His Band
8. Volcano – Jimmy Buffett
9. Going Home – Mark Knopfler *
10. Brothers in Arms – Mark Knopfler
11. Money for Nothing – Mark Knopfler
12. Fields of Gold – Sting *
13. Message in a Bottle – Sting
14. Every Little Thing She Does Is Magic – Sting
15. Your Song – Elton John
16. Live Like Horses – Elton John
17. Don't Let the Sun Go Down On Me – Elton John
18. Broken Hearted – Eric Clapton
19. Layla – Eric Clapton
20. Same Old Blues – Eric Clapton
21. Yesterday – Paul McCartney
22. Golden Slumbers/Carry That Weight (Note: includes Phil Collins's reprise of the Ringo Starr drum solo)/The End – Paul McCartney
23. Hey Jude – Paul McCartney
24. Kansas City – Paul McCartney

Not on DVD*

== Music for Montserrat recordings and versions ==
The initial 1997 recording and broadcast was aired by SkyTV's Sky Box Office on a pay-per-view basis, to be later released in DVD format by Eagle Entertainment and Image Entertainment.

This DVD and VHS release was a condensed version of the live performance, featuring some of the most popular songs played during the concert.

Some VHS edition featured a CD with three songs from the concert

Music for Montserrat CD
No.	Title	Writer(s)	Performer	Length
1.	"Take Me Home"	Phil Collins	Phil Collins feat. house band and Ray Cooper	7:22
2.	"Brothers In Arms"	Mark Knopfler	Mark Knopfler with Guy Fletcher	7:41
3.	"Hey Jude"	Lennon–McCartney	Paul McCartney, Elton John, Sting accompanied by all performers	5:11

Title (format)	Label	Country	Year
Music For Montserrat (VHS, NTSC)	Eagle Rock Entertainment PLC	United States	1997
Music For Montserrat – The Royal Albert Hall, September 15, 1997 (Laserdisc)	Eagle Rock		1997
Music for Montserrat (DVD-V, Multichannel, PAL)	Eagle Vision, Eagle Vision, Eagle Vision	France	1997
Music for Montserrat (DVD-V, PAL, DVD)	Eagle Vision		1997
Music for Montserrat (VHS, Ltd, PAL + CD)	Eagle Vision, Eagle Vision	UK & Europe	1997
Music for Montserrat (DVD-V, Multichannel, NTSC, DTS)	Not On Label	Asia	1998
Music for Montserrat (DVD-V, Multichannel, NTSC, DTS)	Image Entertainment, Eagle Rock Entertainment	US	1998
Music for Montserrat (DVD-V, NTSC)	Panorama Music Video	Hong Kong	1998
Music for Montserrat (DVD-V, RE, Multichannel, NTSC, DTS)	Columbia	Japan	1999
Music for Montserrat (DVD-V, Comp, Unofficial)	Image Entertainment (2), GameMania Ltd. (2)	Israel	2000
Music for Montserrat (VHS, PAL)	Eagle Vision	UK & Europe	2000
Music for Montserrat (DVD-V, Multichannel, NTSC)	Eagle Vision, ST2 Video	Brazil	2001
Music for Montserrat (DVD-V, Multichannel, NTSC)	Eagle Vision, ST2 Video	Brazil	2001
Music for Montserrat (DVD-V, Multichannel, NTSC, Reg)	Eagle Vision	UK	2001
Music for Montserrat (DVD-V, Multichannel, NTSC)	Eagle Vision	Japan	2002
Music for Montserrat (DVD-V, Multichannel, NTSC, Dol + CD, Album)	Eagle Vision	Brazil	2003
Music for Montserrat (DVD-V, Multichannel, PAL)	Eagle Vision	UK & Europe	2003
Music for Montserrat (DVD-V, Multichannel, PAL)	Eagle Vision, Eagle Vision	France	2003
Music for Montserrat (DVD-V, Unofficial, Multichannel, PAL)	Eagle Rock Entertainment PLC (2)	Russia	2003
Music for Montserrat (DVD-V, Album, RE, Multichannel, PAL)	Eagle Vision	Spain	2004
Music for Montserrat (DVD-V, PAL)	Eagle Vision	Portugal	Unknown
Music for Montserrat (DVD-V, PAL)	Eagle Rock Entertainment PLC (2), MAWA Film & Medien	Germany	Unknown
Music for Montserrat (DVD-V, PAL)	MAWA Film & Medien, Film Office, Eagle Rock Entertainment PLC	Europe	Unknown

== Fundraising ==
Fundraising was focused on revenues from:

- Box office ticket sales for live concert
- DVD sales of performances release in the following months
- TV and radio broadcasts of the concert

Ticket sales from the 15 September 1997 concert, television and radio appearances and DVD sales amounted to raising £1,500,000 for Sir George Martin's Montserrat Foundation. The use of these proceeds was for immediate short-term relief for the islanders whose homes had been destroyed, as well as to fund a new cultural and community Montserrat Cultural Centre.

Sir George Martin was quoted by Paul McCartney as saying to the press following the fundraising effort, "I am delighted that we look set to raise so much money for the long-suffering people of Montserrat. I am very grateful to all the wonderful musicians who will perform in the concert. I’m going to Montserrat in the next few weeks to see for myself where the money raised should be spent to the best effect."

== Legacy ==
The funds raised by 'Music for Montserrat' went to immediate use in supporting the local Montserratian community in the reconstruction of homes, as well as the first funds towards the new Montserrat Cultural Centre.

Following from the concert and the public focus it brought to the devastation caused by the Soufrière Hills eruption, George Martin's next fundraising effort was the release of five hundred 'limited edition' lithographs, featuring his score for the iconic 1965 song "Yesterday" by the Beatles. Signed by both Sir George Martin and Sir Paul McCartney, the proceeds of this sale generated another US$1.4 million which went towards the cultural and community center. In total, the Montserrat Cultural Centre cost nearly US$3 million to construct.

The centre remains in use today, located in Little Bay to the north of the island, as a conference venue and multi-purpose performing arts centre.
