= Unorthodox Behaviour =

Studio album by Brand X
- Released: 18 June 1976
- Recorded: September – October 1975
- Studios: Trident, London
- Genres: Instrumental; jazz fusion; progressive rock
- Length: 41:01
- Labels: Charisma (UK); Passport (US), Jem
- Producers: Brand X, Dennis Mackay

Brand X chronology
Unorthodox Behaviour (1976)	Moroccan Roll (1977)

Unorthodox Behaviour is the first album by the British jazz fusion group Brand X. It peaked at No. 191 on the Billboard 200 in 1976, the same year it was released.

The album combines jazz fusion with progressive rock. It shows extensive use of improvisation in the extended pieces, which is common in both genres of music.

== Reception ==
Professional ratings
Review scores
Source	Rating
AllMusic	4.5/5 stars

In a review for AllMusic, Dave Connolly wrote: "Unorthodox Behaviour samples a variety of styles: from melodic to energetic, ethereal to mathematical. Without a standout soloist..., Brand X does run the risk of sounding like a generic fusion jazz outfit, but their compositional skills pick up the slack nicely. Those interested in the band may do well to start with this album."

== Track listing ==
All Tracks written by Phil Collins, John Goodsall, Robin Lumley and Percy Jones.

Side one
No.	Title	Length
1.	"Nuclear Burn"	6:23
2.	"Euthanasia Waltz"	5:42
3.	"Born Ugly"	8:18

Side two
No.	Title	Length
1.	"Smacks of Euphoric Hysteria"	4:30
2.	"Unorthodox Behaviour"	8:29
3.	"Running on Three"	4:38
4.	"Touch Wood"	3:03

== Personnel ==
Credits per insert of original album release on Charisma Records.

- Robin Lumley – electric and acoustic pianos, Moog synthesizer, string synthesizer on "Nuclear Burn", Echoplex on "Smacks of Euphoric Hysteria"
- John Goodsall – electric and acoustic guitars
- Percy Jones – electric and acoustic basses, marimba on "Unorthodox Behaviour"
- Phil Collins – drums, percussion, vibraphone on "Euthanasia Waltz"

with:

- Jack Lancaster – soprano saxophone on "Touch Wood"

Production

- Brand X – producers
- Dennis Mackay – producer, engineer, mixing
- Robin Lumley – mixing
- Geoff Leach – tape operator
- Julian Taylor – tape operator
- Steve Taylor – tape operator
- Hipgnosis – sleeve design
- All songs published by Fuse Music/Warner Brothers Music

== Release information ==
Year	Type	Label	Catalog #	Country
1976	LP	Charisma	CAS 1117	UK
1976	LP	Passport Records	PB 9819	US
1976	LP	Charisma	6369 977	Netherlands
1989	CD	Virgin	CASCD 1117	UK
1998	CD	Caroline Blue Plate	CAROL 1387-2	US
2006	CD	Toshiba EMI Ltd	VJCP-68782	Japan
