= Percy Jones =

Percy Jones may refer to:

- Percy L. Jones (1875–1941), US Army Medical Corps officer
- Percy Jones (rugby union) (1887–1969), Welsh international rugby player
- Percy Mansell Jones (1889–1968), Welsh professor of French at Bangor and Manchester Universities
- Percy Jones (boxer) (1892–1922), Welsh world champion flyweight in 1914
- Percy Jones (baseball) (1899–1979), American baseball player
- Percy Jones (footballer) (1908–1960), Australian rules footballer for Geelong
- Percy Jones (musician) (born 1947), Welsh bass guitarist

== See also ==
- Peter Jones (Australian rules footballer) (born 1946), known as Percy, Australian rules footballer and coach for Carlton
