= Morris Pert =

British musician (1947–2010)

Morris David Brough Pert (8 September 1947 – 27 April 2010) was a Scottish composer, drummer/percussionist, and pianist who composed in the fields of both contemporary classical and jazz-rock music. His compositions include three symphonies, piano music, chamber and solo instrumental music, choral music and "sonic landscapes" for electronic media; a late major work is "Ankh" for Carnyx and electronics written for eminent trombonist John Kenny.

== Biography ==
Morris Pert was born into a musical family and raised in Arbroath, Scotland where he played variously in percussion, folk (Triad) and rock bands (Vegas) and began to compose. He gained a Trinity College London diploma in piano performance in 1967 and a Bachelor of Music degree from the University of Edinburgh in 1969. He then studied in London on a scholarship at the Royal Academy of Music with Alan Bush (who considered Pert one of his best pupils) and James Blades. He was a prize-winning student, being awarded the 1970 Royal Philharmonic Society Award for his orchestral work Xumbu-Ata, which was broadcast by the BBC. Pert's other orchestral compositions include Missa Festiva for choir and orchestra, Omega Centauri for chamber orchestra and tape, Sun Dragon for large orchestra and tape, Sonores for solo piano, Andromeda Link for solo violin and tape, Eoastrion Op.30 for E-flat clarinet, piano and tape, The Rising of the Moon for large orchestra (Premiered by Hiroyuki Iwaki and the Waseda University S.O.), The Beltane Rites for orchestra (a BBC commission), The Ancient Kindred for orchestra, Ancient Rites for choir and orchestra, Chromosphere for five players and tape, The Ultimate Decay for tape, The Book of Love for percussion and tape, and incidental music for productions of Macbeth (Young Vic), The Tempest, and Peter Pan (Eden Court).

As a rock musician Pert spent two years (1970–1972) with Japanese percussionist Stomu Yamashta as a member of his ensembles "East Wind" and "Red Buddha Theatre". The group created a sensation with performances at The Roundhouse in London. In 1971 he founded the group "Come to the Edge" with Robin Thompson and Andrew Powell. After personnel changes in 1973 this band became "Sun Treader" (or "Suntreader") and recorded two albums. In 1977 Pert, a friend of Peter Robinson, joined the jazz-rock band Brand X for their second album, composing three numbers for their Masques album. He stayed with the band, touring extensively, until 1979.

As a session musician he played with many musicians, including Paul McCartney, Andrew Lloyd Webber, John Williams, Kate Bush, Mike Oldfield, Sally Oldfield, Peter Gabriel, Peter Hammill, Jon Anderson, Elvis Costello, Bryan Ferry and Talk Talk. Among his awards are five gold albums, an American ASCAP award and a NARAS Grammy Award nomination.

He also taught piano as an associate professor at Trinity College London, an activity that probably inspired "Moon Dances" and "Voyage in Space".

A pioneering composer, he saw himself as a musical "explorer", adopting modern techniques of sonority and percussion writing, but nevertheless avoided excesses of cerebralism believing sound and emotional communication to be of fundamental importance. His musical language is marked by a degree of rhythmic and metric complexity and a non-ideological use of serial technique that remains open to aspects of tonality. Another important feature of his music is the degree of improvisation required of soloists, generally in response to a pre-recorded tape. The extramusical stimuli were often cosmological, ranging from generally solar or lunar themes to the more specifically astronomical: "Alpha Centauri", "Omega Centauri", "Chromosphere" etc. or inspired by the wisdom, culture and artefacts of the ancient and medieval world, especially his Pictish forebears, but also drawing on Lucretius, Taoism, Carmichael's Carmina Gadelica and the Bible. Composers mentioned on his website were Arne Nordheim, Stockhausen and Iannis Xenakis. Other discernable influences included Tadeusz Baird and Reginald Smith Brindle, as well as the Polish avant-garde.

Pert built a studio in northwest Scotland, where, among other activities, he worked on a projected fourth symphony (of which no remnants are known but which was to be titled "De Situ Albanie") and on solo piano suites; he also explored electronic music and worked with Japanese soprano Natsuko Mineghishi and her ensemble Klang Collective, based in Melbourne and the American musician Bob Warseck.

Pert died on 27 April 2010 at his home in Balchrick, near Kinlochbervie, in Sutherland, Scotland at the age of 62.

== List of compositions (incomplete) ==
=== Orchestral ===
- "Xumbu-Ata," 3 pieces for orchestra
- "Eilean Donnan Op.17 Elegy and Dance" for Strings and optional timps
- "Sun Dragon," symphonic study for large orchestra and tape
- Symphony No 1 "The Rising of the Moon" (Dedicated to Robert Hall)
- Symphony No 2 "The Beltane Rites" (BBC commission)
- Symphony No 3 "The Ancient Kindred"

=== Vocal/choral ===
- "2 Medieval Lyrics Op.1" (BBC commission)
- "4 Japanese Verses Op.2" for soprano and piano
- "4 Japanese Lyrics" for soprano and flute
- "Epitaphs Op.6" for soprano, piano and percussion
- "Missa Festiva" for 2 part female choir and orchestra
- "The Ultimate Decay" for voices and electronics
- "The Ancient Rites Op.40" for choir and strings

=== Solo piano/keyboard ===
- "For Janet"
- "Suilven Moon"
- "Luminos Op.16"
- "Moon Dances"
- "Sonores," five studies in miniature Op.21
- "Fragmenti II" for harpsichord
- "Voyage in Space," 20 miniatures
- "Stones" or "Standing Stones Suite" (2007), 6 miniatures
- "Mountains Suite" (2007), 6 miniatures

=== Ensemble/chamber/other instrumental ===
- Sonata for clarinet and piano "The Ancient Stone"
- "Delphic Fragments" for flute, horn in F, violin, cello, vibraphone and percussion
- "Alpha Centauri Op.10" for flute/piccolo, percussion and tape
- "Omega Centauri Op.11" for flute, oboe, clarinet, violin, piano, percussion and tape
- "Chromosphere Op.24" for 5 players and tape
- "Luminos Op.16a" for basset horn/clarinet in Bb and piano
- "Andromeda Link" for solo violin and tape
- "Eoastrion Op.29" for E♭ clarinet and tape
- "The Book of Love" for percussion and tape
- "Fragmenti I" for clarinet and piano
- "Cernunno" for wind quintet
- "The Ancient Pattern Op.34"
- "Ankh" for Carnyx, trombone and electronics

=== Rock band ===
- "Zin-Zin" for Sun Treader
- "Stardance" for Sun Treader
- "Orinocco" for Sun Treader
- "From The Region of Capricorn" for Sun Treader
- "Eclipse and after" for Sun Treader
- "Kuikúru" for Sun Treader
- "Sirian Blue" for Sun Treader
- "-Ish" for Brand X
- "Isis Mourning" for Brand X
- "Black Moon" for Brand X
- "Deadly Nightshade" for Brand X
- "Earth Dance" for Brand X

=== Electronic ===
- "Aurora"
- "Magnificat"
- "The Music of Stars"
- "Heaven's Song"

== Discography ==
=== Solo ===
- 1975 – Contemporary Clarinet: The Music of Elisabeth Lutyens (Georgina Dobrée (clarinet) & Morris Pert (piano), Chantry Records, LP)
- 1975 – The Music of Morris Pert: Luminos/Chromosphere/4 Japanese Verses (Chantry Records ABM 21, LP)
- c.1976 – The Big Wave (cassette only)
- 1982 – The Book of Love/Fragmenti I/The Ultimate Decay (Chantry Records CHT007, LP)
- 1998 – Anthem for the Cruthin (single) – digital download
- 2001 – The Voyage (recorded with Suntreader—Pert, Peter Robinson and Neville Whitehead —sometime "in the mid-1970s," North by North West Productions NNW002)
- 2001 – The Music of Stars ("recorded gradually over a period of years as a personal project," North by North West Productions NNW003)
- 2001 – Elektron Musik (recorded "in the mid-1980s," North by North West Productions NNW004)
- 2007 - Voyage in Space ("20 pieces for solo piano")
- 2008 – Desert Dances (Buckyball Records br021)
- 2011 – Chromosphere/Dorian Terilament/Heaven's Song/The Ultimate Decay – digital download

=== Session work/band member (partial list) ===
Year	Artist	Album	Notes
1972	Stomu Yamashta & Come to the Edge	Floating Music	
1973	Jonesy	Growing	
1973	Stomu Yamashta's Red Buddha Theatre	The Soundtrack From "The Man From The East"	
1973	Suntreader	Zin Zin	
1974	Steve Swindells	Messages	
1974	Caravan and the New Symphonia	Caravan and the New Symphonia	
1975	Isotope	Deep End	
1975	Bloodstone	Train Ride To Hollywood	
1975	Jack Lancaster And Robin Lumley	Marscape	
1976	Quantum Jump	Quantum Jump	
1976	Bryan Ferry	Let's Stick Together	
1976	Patty Pravo	Tanto	
1976	Bryan Ferry	Extended Play	
1976	John Williams	John Williams And Friends	
1976	John G. Perry	Sunset Wading	
1977	Smak	Crna dama	
1977	Adrian Wagner	Instincts	
1977	Brand X	Moroccan Roll	
1977	Brand X	Livestock	
1977	Elkie Brooks	Two Days Away	
1977	Arthur Brown	Chisholm in My Bosom	
1977	Family of Love Avec Jeane Manson Et Demis Roussos	La Bible	2xLP
1977	Chris de Burgh	At The End of a Perfect Day	
1978	Rod Argent	Moving Home	
1978	Kate Bush	The Kick Inside	
1978	The Walker Brothers	Nite Flights	
1978	Brand X	Masques	
1978	John Williams	The John Williams Collection	
1978	Nik Turner's Sphynx	Xitintoday	
1978	John Williams	The Best of John Williams	
1978	Adrian Wagner	The Last Inca	
1979	Brand X	Product	
1979	Mike Oldfield	Platinum	
1979	Wings	Back to the Egg	
1979	Cheryl Lynn	In Love	
1979	Anthony Phillips	Sides	
1979	Cherry Vanilla	Venus D'Vinyl	
1979	The Dukes	The Dukes	
1979	Marianne Faithfull	Broken English	
1979	Colin Blunstone	Late Nights in Soho	
1979	Gordon Giltrap	The Peacock Party	
1980	Murray Head	Voices	
1980	Mike Oldfield	QE2	
1980	Marti Webb	Take That Look Off Your Face	
1980	Peter Gabriel	Peter Gabriel	
1980	Graham De Wilde	Clouds	
1980	Peter Green	Little Dreamer	
1980	Donovan	Neutronica	
1980	Night	Long Distance	
1980	Kate Bush	Never For Ever	
1980	Mike Rutherford	Smallcreep's Day	
1980	Brand X	Do They Hurt?	
1980	Eberhard Schoener	Events	
1980	Lucio Battisti	Una giornata uggiosa	
1980	Sally Oldfield	Celebration	
1980	Stonebridge McGuinness	Corporate Madness	
1980	AJ Webber	Clevedon Pier	EP
1981	Anthony Phillips	1984	
1981	Peter Hammill	Sitting Targets	
1981	Peter Green	Blue Guitar	
1981	Eberhard Schoener	Time Square	
1982	Trevor Jones	The Dark Crystal Original Soundtrack	
1982	Peter Gabriel	Peter Gabriel	"Kiss of Life", "Wallflower"
1982	Mike Oldfield	Five Miles Out	
1982	Gerry Rafferty	Sleepwalking	
1982	Louis Clark Conducting The Royal Philharmonic Orchestra	Hooked on Classics 2 – Can't Stop The Classics	
1982	Esther Ofarim, Eberhard Schoener, Wolf Wondratschek, Ulf Miehe	Complicated Ladies	
1982	Jon Anderson	Animation	
1983	Anthony Phillips Band	Invisible Men	
1983	Andrew Powell And The Philharmonia Orchestra	Play The Best of The Alan Parsons Project	
1983	Alain Chamfort	Secrets Glacés	
1983	Elvis Costello & The Attractions	Punch The Clock	
1983	Nick Heyward	North of a Miracle	
1983	Graham Parker	The Real Macaw	
1984	Talk Talk	It's My Life	
1984	Mike Oldfield	The Killing Fields	
1985	Freeez	Idle Vice	as Maurice Pert
1985	The Explorers	Explorers	
1985	Peter Gabriel	Birdy	
1985	Kate Bush	Hounds of Love	
1986	Talk Talk	The Colour of Spring	
1986	Brand X	Xtrax	
1988	John Martyn	One World	
1988	The Adventures	The Sea of Love	as Maurice Pert
1988	Alexis Korner	Alexis Korner And... 1972 – 1983	
1988	Gerry Rafferty	North and South	as Maurice Pert
1990	Nova	Blink	
1992	Smak	Retrospektiva	
1992	Brand X	The Plot Thins: A History of Brand X	
1993	Wilding / Bonus	Pleasure Signals	
1994	Big Jim Sullivan Band/Tiger	Test of Time	
1998	Brand X	The X-Files: A 20 Year Retrospective	
1998	Marianne Faithfull	A Perfect Stranger: The Island Anthology	
1998	Mike Oldfield	Five Miles Out / Crises / Heaven's Open	3xCD, Comp
1999	Bryan Ferry	In Your Mind	
1999	Brand X	Timeline	2xCD
2000	Talk Talk	It's My Life / The Colour of Spring / Spirit of Eden	Box + 3xCD
2002	Kate Bush	The Kick Inside / Lionheart	2xCD
2004	Night	Night / Long Distance	CD, Comp
2006	Mike Oldfield	Live at Montreux 1981	DVD
2008	Stomu Yamashta	Floating Music & The Man From The East	2xCD
2009	Mike Oldfield	The Mike Oldfield Collection 1974-1983	
