= Hit & Run Music Publishing =

- Industry: Music publishing
- Founded: 10 October 1977; 47 years ago in London, England
- Founders: Jon Crawley; Tony Smith
- Headquarters: London, England

Hit & Run Music Publishing in the United Kingdom founded in 1977 by Tony Smith and Jon Crawley. Hit & Run's clients include Phil Collins, Genesis, Brand X, Mike & the Mechanics and Kula Shaker, among others. The company owned publishing rights to such songs as the 1991 Grammy Award winning "Record of the Year", "Another Day in Paradise", "In the Air Tonight", "I Can't Dance" and "Invisible Touch". EMI bought a majority stake in the company in 1999 for the US$19 million. Smith remains the chairman of the company. The company has since expanded to include film production as Hit and Run Productions. One of the subsidiary names used by Hit & Run was Hidden Pun, which is used on some records by former Genesis members, including Peter Gabriel.
