= Manifest Destiny (Brand X album) =

Studio album by Brand X
- Released: 5 February 1997
- Recorded: February 1996
- Studio: Total Access Recording Studios (Redondo Beach, California)
- Genre: Jazz fusion
- Length: 50:46
- Label: Cleopatra
- Producer: David Hentschel

Brand X chronology
X-Communication (1992)	Manifest Destiny (1997)

Professional ratings
Review scores
Source	Rating
All About Jazz	(positive)
AllMusic	1.5/5 stars

Manifest Destiny is the eighth and final studio album by jazz fusion group Brand X.

== Track listing ==
1. "True to the Clik" (Goodsall, Pusch) – 5:31
2. "Stellerator" (Jones) – 6:17
3. "Virus" (Goodsall, Pusch) – 7:56
4. "XXL" (Goodsall) – 5:51
5. "The Worst Man" (Jones) – 4:33
6. "Manifest Destiny" (Goodsall, Jones, Katz, Wagnon) – 4:11
7. "Five Drops" (Wagnon) – 3:52
8. "Drum Ddu" (Jones) – 5:50
9. "Operation Hearts and Minds" (Goodsall) – 4:39
10. "Mr. Bubble Goes to Hollywood" (Jones, Katz) – 2:56

Hidden tracks on European release

11. "Disco Suicide" - Live (Robin Lumley) – 8:06
12. "Bass and Drum Solo Improvisation" - Live – 9:44

== Personnel ==
- John Goodsall – guitars (1, 3, 4, 7, 8, 9), MIDI guitar [orchestra pad + vapor guitar] (2), MIDI guitar Hammond organ samples (3), "reverse" guitar solo (3), narrator (3), wah guitar (4), MIDI guitar sitar sample solo and triggered bass line (4), MIDI guitar synth sets (5), rhythm guitar (5, 9), tubular bells (5), MIDI guitar synth pad (6), acoustic guitar (7), MIDI guitar Arabian reed sample (8)
- Franz Pusch – keyboards (1, 3), percussion samples (1), sound effects (1), bass section (3), sequenced drums (3), percussion (3), vocals (3), Rhodes piano (4), synth pad + lick (4), samples (4), berimbau (4)
- Percy Jones – fretless bass (1, 2, 3, 5–10), keyboards (2, 8), wal bass effects (4), sequencing (5)
- Frank Katz – drums (1–6, 8, 9, 10), vocals (4), lower kick samples (5)
- Pierre Moerlen – drums (on hidden live tracks)
- Marc Wagnon – MIDI vibraphone (2, 5), synth percussion effects + orchestra pad (2), triggered brass (5), MIDI vibe synth pad (6, 7, 9), percussive orchestra hits (8)
- Danny Wilding – flute (5)

Additional personnel

- Ronnie Ciago – rainstick (3), shaker (3), tamtam (3), udu (3)

Production

- Shawn Ahern – executive producer
- Sami Kaneda – executive producer
- David Hentschel – producer, engineer
- Keith Lewis – technical assistance, equipment
- Franz Pusch – pre-production and programming (1, 3, 4)
- Mark Tessler – photography
