= Moroccan Roll =

Studio album by Brand X
- Released: April 1977
- Recorded: December 1976–January 1977
- Studio: Trident and Morgan (London, UK).
- Genre: Jazz fusion
- Length: 49:30
- Label: Charisma (UK); Passport (USA)
- Producer: Dennis Mackay

Brand X chronology
| Unorthodox Behaviour (1976) | Moroccan Roll (1977) | Livestock (1977) |

Professional ratings
Review scores
| Source | Rating |
|---|---|
| AllMusic | 3.5/5 stars |
| The Rolling Stone Record Guide | 3/5 stars |

Moroccan Roll is the second studio album by the British jazz fusion group Brand X. The title is a pun referring to this being their second album: "more rock and roll", however, Moroccan Roll is not a step toward the rock and roll side of the fusion equation, but rather an experiment with Eastern sounds and softer textures. The album is mostly instrumental. "Sun in the Night" contains vocals sung by Brand X drummer Phil Collins in Sanskrit. "Disco Suicide" and "Maybe I'll Lend You Mine After All" also contain vocals, although they are wordless.

== Track listing ==
Side one

1. "Sun in the Night" (John Goodsall) – 4:25
2. "Why Should I Lend You Mine (When You've Broken Yours Off Already)..." (Phil Collins) – 11:16
3. "...Maybe I'll Lend You Mine After All" (Collins) – 2:10
4. "Hate Zone" (Goodsall) – 4:41
5. "Collapsar" (Robin Lumley) – 1:33

Side two

1. "Disco Suicide" (Lumley) – 7:55
2. "Orbits" (Percy Jones) – 1:38
3. "Malaga Virgen" (Jones) – 8:28
4. "Macrocosm" (Goodsall) – 7:24

== Personnel ==
Based on the album credits of original vinyl release.

- Robin Lumley – Fender Rhodes electric piano, acoustic piano, Minimoog, ARP Odyssey, Roland string synthesizer, clavinet, Pulsar, space echo, backing vocals, autoharp (5)
- John Goodsall – electric guitars, acoustic guitars, sitar (1), space echo, backing vocals
- Percy Jones – Fender bass, autoharp (7), marimba (8)
- Phil Collins – drums, lead vocals, acoustic piano (3)
- Morris Pert – percussion

Production

- Dennis Mackay – producer
- Brand X – associate producers
- Stephen W. Tayler – engineer, mixing
- Chris Tsangarides – tape operator
- John Brand – tape operator
- Geoff Leach – tape operator
- Neil Ross – tape operator
- Ray Staff – mastering
- Hipgnosis – sleeve design, cover photography
- George Hardie – sleeve design
- Rob Brimson – band photography

== Charts ==
| Chart (1977) | Peak position |
|---|---|
| UK Albums Chart | 37 |
