= Jack Lancaster =

English musician (1945–2025)

Jack Lancaster as part of Blodwyn Pig in 1969

Jack Lancaster (1945 – May 2025) was an English composer, record producer and musician.

In the late 1960s, Lancaster co-founded the British rock group Blodwyn Pig with Jethro Tull guitarist Mick Abrahams and in the late 1970s he was a member of the British progressive rock group Aviator with former Jethro Tull drummer Clive Bunker, former Manfred Mann's Earth Band guitarist Mick Rogers, and former Caravan and Quantum Jump bassist John G. Perry that released two albums on the EMI America Records label (Lancaster appeared only on the band's debut). In between these high-profile projects, he collaborated with keyboardist Robin Lumley in the studio band The Soul Searchers with a line-up that included guitarists Gary Moore and John Goodsall, bassist Percy Jones, and drummer Bill Bruford. This group released one 7" single Scaramouche b/w Head Stand in 1975 for EMI Records.

Lancaster performed on two jazz fusion records with Lumley that were released by RSO Records in the mid-1970s. The first was The Rock Peter and the Wolf (1975), a rock version of Russian composer Sergei Prokofiev's Peter and the Wolf, and the second was Marscape (1976); both albums featured the contributions of members of what would become Lumley's future band Brand X (John Goodsall, Percy Jones, and Phil Collins on drums).

In 1979, Lancaster and Dutch keyboardist Rick van der Linden released the electronic album Wild Connections on the Acrobat Records label that featured former Blue Mink drummer Barry Morgan and The English Chorale. 1980, he released a solo album on the Kamera Records label titled Skinningrove Bay that included Rod Argent, Clive Bunker, Phil Collins, Robin Lumley, Gary Moore, John G. Perry, Mick Rogers, Rick van der Linden and Bernie Frost.

Subsequently he performed live on tour, composed for television and film, performed as a session musician and produced, wrote and arranged recording sessions with artists including Gary Moore, Phil Collins, Rod Argent, Anthony Phillips, Hans Zimmer, Stéphane Grappelli, Brian Eno, The View, Vangelis and Rick van der Linden.

Lancaster died in May 2025.

== Discography ==
=== With Blodwyn Pig ===
- 1969: Ahead Rings Out
- 1970: Getting to This
- 1997: Live at The Lafayette
- 1997: The Modern Alchemist
- 1999: On Air
- 1999: Live at the Fillmore West
- 2000: The Basement tapes
- 2002: Live At The Marquee Club London 1974 (The Official Bootleg)
- 2004: Pigthology

=== Soul Searchers ===
- 1975: "Scaramouche" / "Head Start" – Single

=== Aviator ===
- 1979: Aviator

=== Solo recordings ===
- 1975: Peter & The Wolf – with Robin Lumley, Phil Collins, Bill Bruford, Stéphane Grappelli, Alvin Lee, Gary Moore, Manfred Mann, Chris Spedding, Gary Brooker, Brian Eno, Keith Tippett, Cozy Powell, etc.
- 1976: Marscape – with the musicians of Brand X – Robin Lumley, John Goodsall, Percy Jones & Phil Collins.
- 1979: Wild Connections – with Rick van der Linden, with The English Chorale.
- 1980: Skinningrove Bay – with Gary Moore, Phil Collins, Bernie Frost, John G. Perry, Clive Bunker, Mick Rogers, Rod Argent, Rick van der Linden, Robin Lumley, etc. (Re-released under the title Deep Green in 1991.)
- 1995: The Deathray Tapes – with Mick Farren, Brad Dourif.
- 2016: Carnival of the Animals – with Phil Collins, Rod Argent, Gary Brooker, John Kramer, Mick Abrahams, etc.
