= X-Communication =

X-communication

Studio album by Brand X
- Released: 1992
- Recorded: 1992
- Studios: Grampa (New York, NY)
- Genre: Jazz fusion
- Length: 45:38
- Label: Ozone
- Producers: John Goodsall, Percy Jones

Brand X chronology
Is There Anything About? (1982)	X-communication (1992)	Manifest Destiny (1997)

Professional ratings
Review scores
Source	Rating
AllMusic	3/5 stars
The Encyclopedia of Popular Music	2/5 stars

X-communication is the seventh studio album by jazz fusion band Brand X, released in 1992. It was the band's first studio release in more than a decade.

== Track listing ==
All tracks written by John Goodsall, except where noted.

1. "Xanax Taxi" – 5:57
2. "Liquid Time" – 4:39
3. "Kluzinski Period" (Percy Jones) – 7:00
4. "Healing Dream" – 3:51
5. "Mental Floss" – 3:17
6. "Strangeness" (Jones) – 3:23
7. "A Duck Exploding" (Goodsall, Jones) – 6:47
8. "Message to You" – 0:25
9. "Church of Hype" (Jones) – 5:54
10. "Kluzinski Reprise" (Goodsall, Jones) – 4:25

== Personnel ==
- John Goodsall – guitars, MIDI guitar
- Percy Jones – fretless bass, keyboards (6)
- Frank Katz – drums

Additional personnel

- Danny Wilding – flute (3, 10)

Production

- Gilad Amarillo – executive producer
- Doran Scarf – executive producer
- John Goodsall – producer
- Percy Jones – producer
- Mick Cantarella – engineer (1, 2, 3, 5–10), mixing
- Franz Pusch – engineer (4)
- Keith Lewis – second engineer (4)
- Jim Shelton – mastering at Europadisk (New York, NY)
- Laurence Horvitz – art direction, design
- Naomi Kaneda – cover photography
- Isaac Silman – design, inside and back photography
