= John Goodsall =

British musician (1953–2021)

John Goodsall (15 February 1953 – 10 November 2021 (Note: As far as the exact date of death is concerned, numerous false statements are circulating on the internet. The only reliable reference is the photocopy of the death certificate provided by John Goodsall's daughter Natasha Kaneda.)) was a British-American progressive rock and jazz fusion guitarist most noted for his work with Brand X, Atomic Rooster, and The Fire Merchants.

== Life and career ==
Goodsall was born in Middlesex, England in February 1953, and lived in England, Los Angeles, Milan and Minnesota. He began playing guitar at age 7. At 15, he became a professional musician and joined Carol Grimes' Babylon, with members of Joe Cocker's Grease Band, Juicy Lucy and Jon Hiseman's Colosseum. He then went on tour with The Alan Bown Set and, now 18 years old, formed his first own band, Sandoz, in his hometown. The group was mainly influenced by Captain Beefheart and The Grateful Dead. Goodsall, with Jim Mercer (bass) and Gary Lonsdale (drums), recorded three tracks at a local recording studio with financial support from their parents, which were released as a limited edition EP of 350 copies on Shagrat Records in January 1995 under the title Pay Attention. Colin Hill writes in his liner notes to the EP:

The three remarkable recordings presented here for the first time (each of them is over eight minutes long) prove that Sandoz were at least one step ahead of most of their contemporaries, their musical hedonism, replete with all manner of complex time changes, intricate ensemble passages, rapid instrumental workouts and polytonal counter-rhythms, suddenly drifting off on spectacular tangential trips.

—

For a time Ric Parnell also played for Sandoz, but then moved to Atomic Rooster. It was Ric Parnell who brought John Goodsall to Atomic Rooster a year later in 1972. For his stint with Atomic Rooster, he adopted the pseudonym "Johnny Mandala". Goodsall was a member of this band for a total of four years.

In 1974, Goodsall played frequently with guitarist Pete Bonas (credited as Pete Bonus on numerous recordings), drummer John Dillon and percussionist and vocalist Phil Spinelli at the recording studios of Island Records (London) in jam sessions. Through the intercession of young studio technician Paul "Sheds" Jackson at PSL Studios, Goodsall and Bonas came into contact with Percy Jones (bass) and Robin Lumley (keyboard). Jackson arranged for Jones and Lumley to audition with the A&R in charge, Island Records manager Richard Williams, who eventually offered the two to join the still-unnamed "Island Band". In the summer of 1975, this "Island Band" eventually crystallised into Brand X with Phil Collins as drummer.

That same year, Goodsall collaborated with Robin Lumley on the album Peter and the Wolf, a pop adaptation of the Prokofiev classic Peter and the Wolf, and the following year, 1976, on the album Marscape. Both albums were produced by Jack Lancaster.

In 1977 Goodsall was involved in the making of the album Pleasure Signals by Wilding/Bonus. Danny Wilding, like Pete Bonas (aka Pete Bonus), was part of the "Island Band" and is credited with giving Brand X its name. Other contributors were Phil Collins, Michael Shrieve and John Giblin. The album is flute-oriented progressive rock.

After Brand X's 1979 world tour (the last with Phil Collins), Goodsall moved to Los Angeles and worked as a session musician and as a member of the band Zoo Drive (1980–1987) which included Doug Lunn, Paul Delph and Atomic Rooster drummer Ric Parnell. Goodsall also performed and/or recorded with Bill Bruford, Desmond Dekker & The Aces, Peter Gabriel, Bryan Adams and Toni Basil. In 1992, he also toured with bandmate Percy Jones and Ronnie Ciago, accompanying Swiss keyboardist Patrick Moraz.

John Goodsall's next project, The Fire Merchants, released two albums, Fire Merchants and Landlords of Atlantis before Goodsall and Percy Jones re-formed Brand X as a trio in 1992 with drummer Frank Katz. Katz was in Jones' band Tunnels with whom Goodsall also recorded on their album Progressivity. This Brand X line-up released X-Communication and Manifest Destiny, which also featured Tunnels' midi-vibes player Marc Wagnon and some keyboards and composition by Franz Pusch. John Goodsall and Franz Pusch continued to work mostly in studio, recently on Franz's music with drummer Ronnie Ciago and Yes bassist Billy Sherwood. Pusch produced The Fire Merchants self-titled debut album with Goodsall, Doug Lunn (bass) and Chester Thompson (drums). This trio was featured on Tamiya Lynn's self-titled album and other projects.

Most of the keyboard/synthesiser sounds however in the Brand X and Fire Merchants trios were triggered by Goodsall's MIDI guitar. In 1997, Brand X embarked on a three-month tour of Europe and Japan as a quartet with John Goodsall, Percy Jones, keyboardist Kris Sjobring from Goodsall's L.A. based group Trancendental Medication, and drummer Pierre Moerlen from Gong. Later versions of this group released The X-Files and Missing Period. They played the west coast again in 1999 including a headline show at Progfest in San Francisco's Golden Gate Park.

He played live with his new band Ghost Society in 2008. Later albums featuring Goodsall included Franz Pusch Only Visions and Leon Alvarado Strangers in Strange Places. During his last years, Goodsall continued to record on sessions for international projects in Japan, Germany, England, the U.S. and France.

Goodsall was married twice and had two daughters, Germaine and Natasha. He died on 10 November 2021, at the age of 68. The cause of death was determined to be COVID-19 disease. (Note: In relation to John Goodsall's illness and the cause of death, erroneous information was initially given on the internet. It was known that John Goodsall had to go to the hospital for pneumonia in September 2021, but this was not the reason for his demise.) John Goodsall's ashes were scattered in the sea off the coast of Santa Catalina (California) on 20 January 2022 in a burial at sea with immediate family and friends. (Note: In order to initially pay for the body's repatriation, cremation and burial at sea, Goodsall's daughter Natasha Kaneda set up a fundraising campaign that ultimately raised US$8,511.)

== Performance history ==
John Goodsall:[Guitars, Midi Guitar] Performed live and-or recorded with Brand X, Bryan Adams, Jeff Beck, The Alan Bown Set, James Bracken, Leon Alvarado, Loughty Amao, Rod Argent, Atomic Rooster, Toni Basil, King Sunny Adé's African Beats, Bill Bruford, Carol Grimes' Babylon, Celebrity Skin, Ava Cherry, Eric Clapton, Mike Clark, Billy Cobham, Todd Cochran, Phil Collins, Paulinho da Costa, The Cruisers, Lisa Dal Bello, Desmond Dekker and The Aces, Paul Delph, Michael Des Barres, Dr. John, Mick Fleetwood, The Fire Merchants, Flea, Andy Fraser, Peter Gabriel, Roscoe Gee, Kevin Gilbert, Donni Harvey, Rupert Hine, Eddie Howell, Diana Hubbard, Billy Idol, Mark Isham, Liquid Junior, Quantum Jump, John Kay, Cheryl Ladd, Gasper Lawal, Karen Lawrence, Long Beach Mercenaries, Tamiya Lynn, Melissa Manchester, John Martyn, Junior Marvin, Bette Midler, Patrick Moraz, Billy Preston, Franz Pusch, X-Ray Spex, Chester Thompson, Alphonso Johnson, Jan Hammer, Anthony Phillips, The Reactors, Nona Hendrix, Sylvia St. James, Jack Lancaster, Terry Reid, Katey Sagal, Sandoz, Hunt Sales, Tony Sales, Jamie Sherriff, Michael Shrieve, Jimmie Spheeris, Blue Thunder, Top Topham, Tunnels, Chuck Turner's Turneround, Lee Ving, Bill Ward Band, The Weather Girls, Wilding/Bonus etc.

Goodsall also played on several film scores including No Small Affair, The Doorman, Can't Buy Me Love, North Shore, Anal Intruder 9, Wave Warriors 2, Wave Warriors 3, and Point Break.

== Discography ==
=== Brand X ===
==== Studio ====
- Unorthodox Behaviour (1976)
- Moroccan Roll (1977)
- Masques (1978)
- Product (1979)
- Do They Hurt? (1980)
- Is There Anything About? (1982)
- Xcommunication (1992)
- Manifest Destiny (1997)
- Missing Period (1998)

==== Live ====
- Livestock (1977)
- Live at the Roxy LA (1979, released 1995)
- But Wait, There's Still more! (2017)
- Locked and Loaded (2018)

==== Compilation ====
- The Plot Thins: A History of Brand X (1992)
- X-Files: A 20 Year Retrospective (1999), compilation including side projects
- Timeline (2000)
- Trilogy (2003)

=== Atomic Rooster ===
- Nice 'n' Greasy (1973)

=== Bill Bruford ===
- Feels Good to Me (1978)

=== Fire Merchants ===
- Fire Merchants (1989) John Goodsall/Doug Lunn/Chester Thompson
- Landlords of Atlantis (1994) John Goodsall/Doug Lunn/Toss Panos

=== Long Beach Mercenaries ===
- Greasy Fingers [Long Beach Mercenaries](2000)

=== Tamiya Lynn ===
- Tamiya Lynn

=== Franz Pusch ===
- Only Visions (2010)
- Lustig and Munter (2016)

=== Leon Alvarado ===
- Strangers in Strange Places (2011)

=== Cymbalic Encounters ===
- Cymbalic Encounters (2012)
- Exploration of the Southern Constellation (2015)

== Session work with Zoo Drive ==
- Lifetimes – Diana Hubbard (1979)
- I'm Only Human – Michael Des Barres (1980)
- Drastic Measures – Lisa Dalbello (1981)
- Streetcar Named Desire – Ava Cherry (1981)
- Targets – Jamie Sherriff (1982)
- Word of Mouth – Toni Basil (1982) featuring Hit-Single Mickey
- Spheeris – Jimmie Spheeris (1984)
- Tamiya Lynn – Tamiya Lynn (1992)
- A God That Can Dance – Paul Delph (1996)
