= Kenwood Dennard =

American jazz drummer

Kenwood Marshall Dennard (born March 1, 1956, New York City) is an American jazz drummer and retired professor from Berklee College of Music in Boston, MA.

Dennard learned piano as a child and took up drumming at nine years of age. He attended the Manhattan School of Music from 1972 to 1973 and Berklee College of Music from 1973 to 1976. Later in the decade he worked with Dizzy Gillespie, performed on the acclaimed album Joyous Lake (1977) with Pat Martino, was a member of the band High Life and recorded the progressive rock album Livestock with Brand X. He played with Martino again in the late 1980s and with the Manhattan Transfer, Dianne Reeves, Jaco Pastorius, Lew Soloff, Bob Moses, and Stanley Jordan during that decade.

In the 1990s he worked with Miles Davis, Maceo Parker, Quincy Jones, and Howard Johnson. He also led his own ensembles, including Just Advance, the Meta-Funk All Stars, and Quintessence; his sidemen have included Victor Bailey, Dave Bargeron, Hiram Bullock, Stanton Davis, Marcus Miller, Tal Wilkenfeld, Esperanza Spaulding, TM Stevens, Delmar Brown, Vernon Reid and Herman Wright Jr. In 1997 he began teaching at Berklee.

== Discography ==
=== As leader ===
- Just Advance (Big World Music, 1992)
- Show No Fear (Groove Economy Records, 2018)

=== As sideman ===
With Dave Bargeron

- Barge Burns...Slide Flies (1995)
- Tuba Tuba (2002)

With Brand X

- Livestock (1977)
- Live from San Francisco (1977)
- X-Trax (1987)
- Timeline (2000)
- Macrocosm: Introducing...Brand X (2003)
- Rochester 1977 (2016)

With Stanley Jordan

- Cornucopia (1990)
- Stolen Moments (1991)
- State of Nature (2008)
- Friends (2011)

With Pat Martino

- Joyous Lake (1977)
- Stone Blue (1998)
- First Light (1999)

With Maceo Parker

- Life on Planet Groove (1992)

With Jaco Pastorius

- PDB (1989)
- Live in New York City Vol. 1: Punk Jazz (1990)
- Live in New York City Vol. 2: Trio (1991)
- Live in New York City Vol. 3: Promise Land (1991)
- Live in New York City Vol. 4: Trio 2 (1992)
- Holiday for Pans (1993)
- Live in New York City Vol. 6: Punk Jazz 2 (1999)
- Live in New York City (2001)
- Modern Electric Bass: Revised Edition (2002)

With Dianne Reeves

- For Every Heart (1977)
- The Grand Encounter (1996)
- The Palo Alto Sessions (1996)

With others

- Nothing Like the Sun (1987), Sting
- The Story of Moses (1987), Bob Moses
- Diamond Land (1988), Toninho Horta
- Il Suono (1992), John Clark
- Miles & Quincy Live at Montreux (1993), Miles Davis and Quincy Jones
- The Sweetest Days (1995), Vanessa Williams
- Gravity!!! (1996), Howard Johnson
- Sketches of Coryell (1996), Larry Coryell
- Right Now! (1997), Howard Johnson
- Soul Manifesto Live (2003), Rodney Jones
- Live Vol. 1 (2007), Robin Eubanks
- David Fiuczynksi's Planet Microjam (2012), David Fiuczynski
