= J. Peter Robinson =

English film and television score composer (born 1945)

- Born: John Peter Robinson; 16 September 1945 (age 80); Fulmer, Buckinghamshire, England
- Occupations: Film score composer; arranger; musician
- Instrument: Keyboards
- Years active: 1960s–present
- Website: jpeterrobinson.com

John Peter Robinson (born 16 September 1945) is an English composer, musician, and arranger known for his film and television scores.

== Early years and pop music career ==
Robinson studied piano and composition at the Royal Academy of Music and performed as a session keyboardist throughout the 1970s, working with artists such as Brand X, Phil Collins, Mike Rutherford, Shawn Phillips, Quatermass, Sun Treader/Morris Pert, Carly Simon, Bryan Ferry, Stealers Wheel, Andrew Lloyd Webber, the Hollies, Stanley Clarke and others. As a successful pop arranger, he has also collaborated in later years with Eric Clapton, Manhattan Transfer, Al Jarreau and Melissa Etheridge, among others.

== Film music career ==
Robinson made his film music debut as a solo composer in 1985, scoring a number of successful films including The Believers (1987), The Kiss (1988), Cocktail (1988), Blind Fury (1989), Wayne's World (1992), Wes Craven's New Nightmare (1994), Highlander III: The Sorcerer (1994), Vampire in Brooklyn (1995, also directed by Wes Craven), Firestorm (1998), The World's Fastest Indian (2005) and The Bank Job (2008). He also composed for numerous television films and series including The Wonder Years, Eerie, Indiana, Tales from the Crypt, Todd McFarlane's Spawn, The Outer Limits, and Charmed.

In addition he scored the horror films The Wraith (1986) and The Gate (1987) with Michael Hoenig, and scored the English-language version of Godzilla 2000. He also composed music for the 1989 movie The Wizard, as well as two songs from the film Shelter (2007), and music in dozens of episodes of the TV series Charmed.

== Discography ==
=== Quatermass ===
Singles:

- 1970: "Black sheep of the family/Good Lord Knows"
- 1971: "Gemini/Black sheep of the family"
- 1971: "One Blind Mice/Punting"

Album:

- 1970: Quatermass

=== Jesus Christ Superstar ===
- 1970: Jesus Christ Superstar - With Ian Gillan, Murray Head, Yvonne Elliman and Mike d'Abo

=== Shawn Phillips ===
- 1970: Contribution
- 1970: Second Contribution
- 1971: Collaboration: Piano, organ, bass on "Moonshine" and orchestral arrangements on "The Only Logical Conclusion"
- 1973: Bright White: Keyboards and orchestral arrangements on "All The Kings and Castles"
- 1974: Furthermore
- 1974: Do you wonder
- 1976: Rumplestiltskin's Resolve
- 1977: Spaced
- 1978: Transcendance: Piano on "Implication"
- 2024: Outrageous : Live album as a duo with Shawn from the 1975-76 tour

=== Carly Simon ===
- 1972: No Secrets: Piano on "Embrace Me, You Child"

=== Yvonne Elliman ===
- 1972: Yvonne Elliman
- 1973: Food of Love

=== Sun Treader ===
- 1973: Zin Zin
- 2001: The Voyage

=== Stomu Yamashta's Red Buddha Theater ===
- 1973: The Man From The East - Original Score - Robinson on Fender Rhodes on 4 songs
- 2007: Two Originals - The Man From The East & Red Buddha Theater - Compilation

=== Bryan Ferry ===
- 1974: Another Time, Another Place

=== Ablution ===
- 1974: Ablution - With John Gustafson, Barry De Souza, Jayson Lindh, Jan Schaffer, Malando Gassama, Ola Brunkert

=== Lenny White ===
- 1975: Venusian Summer

=== David Bowie ===
- 1977: Low - Piano and ARP Synth on "Subterraneans"

=== Stomu Yamashta's Go ===
- 1977 : Go Too - Keyboards

=== Brand X ===
- 1978: Masques
- 1979: Product - With Phil Collins
- 1980: Do They Hurt? - With Phil Collins
- 1982: Is There Anything About? - With Phil Collins
- 1992: The Plot Thins: A History of Brand X - Compilation: On "The Poke", "Dance of the Illegal Aliens" and "Triumphant Limp"

=== Phil Collins ===
- 1981: Face Value: Prophet V on "Behind the Lines"
- 1982: Hello, I Must Be Going!: Piano, vibes on "You Can't Hurry Love"
- 1998: ...Hits - Compilation: On "You Can't Hurry Love"
- 2004: The Platinum Collection - Compilation: On "Behind the Lines"
- 2016: The Singles - Compilation: On "Behind the Lines" and "You Can't Hurry Love"

=== Anni-Frid Lyngstad (Frida) ===
- 1982: Something's Going On - Robinson on keyboards, string and horn arrangements. With Phil Collins, Daryl Stuermer, Mo Foster, The Phenix Horns from Earth, Wind & Fire and The Martyn Ford Orchestra. Album produced by Phil Collins

=== Mike Rutherford ===
- 1982: Acting Very Strange

=== Eric Clapton ===
- 1985: Behind the Sun - Robinson also collaborated on the writing of "She's Waiting" with Clapton, as well as playing synthesizer on seven songs
- 1999: Clapton Chronicles: The Best of Eric Clapton - Compilation

=== Joan Armatrading ===
- 1995: What's Inside - with Tony Levin, Boz Burrell, Manu Katché, The London Metropolitan Orchestra, etc.

== Partial filmography ==
=== Film ===
- Police Story (1985) - 1998 New Line Cinema home video version
- The Wraith (1986) - with Michael Hoenig
- The Gate (1987) - with Michael Hoenig
- Return of the Living Dead Part II (1987)
- The Believers (1987)
- Police Story 2 (1988) - 1998 New Line Cinema home video version
- The Blob (1988) - with Michael Hoenig
- Cocktail (1988)
- The Kiss (1988)
- Blind Fury (1989)
- The Wizard (1989)
- Cadillac Man (1990)
- Wayne's World (1992)
- Encino Man (1992)
- Wes Craven's New Nightmare (1994) - Themes by Charles Bernstein
- Highlander III: The Sorcerer (1994) - Also conductor, themes by Michael Kamen
- Rumble in the Bronx (1995) - with Nathan Wong
- Mind Ripper (1995)
- Vampire in Brooklyn (1995)
- Police Story 4: First Strike (1996) - English-language version
- Mr. Nice Guy (1997)
- Firestorm (1998)
- Godzilla 2000 (1999) - with Takayuki Hattori
- Detroit Rock City (1999)
- 15 Minutes (2001)
- Wishcraft (2002)
- Beeper (2002)
- The World's Fastest Indian (2005)
- Quinceañera (2006)
- Shelter (2007)
- The Bank Job (2008)
- Blue Crush 2 (2011)
- Seeking Justice (2011)
- Heaven's Floor (2016)
- Mad Families (2017)

=== Television ===
==== Television films ====
- Kate's Secret (1986)
- J. Edgar Hoover (1987)
- Bates Motel (1987)
- When You Remember Me (1990)
- Prison Stories: Women on the Inside (1991)
- Deadly Intentions... Again? (1991)
- Hell Hath No Fury (1991)
- Generation X (1996)
- Buried Secrets (1996)
- Gargantua (1998)
- Brink! (1998)
- Don't Look Down (1998)
- The Linda McCartney Story (2000)
- Black River (2001)
- 12 Days of Terror (2004)

==== Television series ====
- Rags to Riches (1987): 3 episodes
- Nightmare Classics (1989): 1 episode
- The Wonder Years (1990–1991): 16 episodes
- Tales from the Crypt (1990–1996): 6 episodes
- Eerie, Indiana (1991–92): 5 episodes
- Nightmare Cafe (1992): 6 episodes
- The Outer Limits (1995–99): 7 episodes
- Kindred: The Embraced (1996): 6 episodes
- Perversions of Science (1997): 2 episodes
- Charmed (1999–2006): 72 episodes
- Spawn: The Animated Series (1999): 6 episodes
- The Handler (2003–2004): 8 episodes
- Covert One: The Hades Factor (2006): Miniseries; 2 episodes
- Deadliest Catch (2009-10): 17 episodes
- Airplane Repo (2013): 6 episodes
- Cleaners (2013–2014): 18 episodes

== Awards and nominations ==
- 1988 Saturn Award for Best Music: Return of the Living Dead Part II (nominated)
- 1994 Saturn Award for Best Music: Wes Craven's New Nightmare (nominated)
- 2006 New Zealand Screen Award for Best Achievement in Original Music: The World's Fastest Indian (nominated)
