= John Giblin =

British musician (1952–2023)

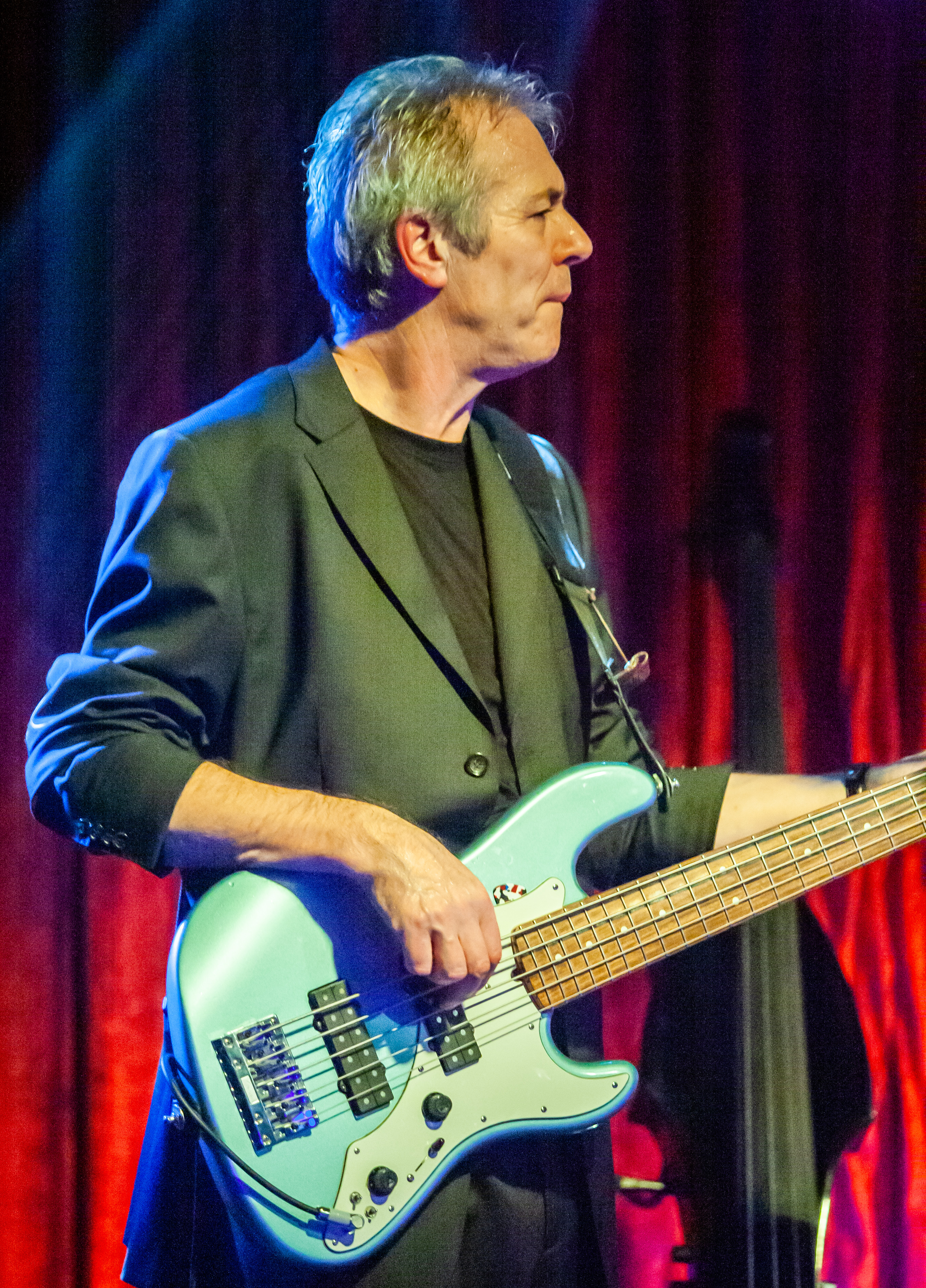
- Giblin in 2007

Background information
- Born: 26 February 1952; Bellshill, North Lanarkshire, Scotland
- Died: 14 May 2023 (aged 71) Cheltenham, Gloucestershire, England
- Genres: Jazz; classical; rock; folk; avant-garde music
- Occupation: Musician
- Instruments: Bass guitar; double bass
- Website: johngiblin.com

John Giblin (26 February 1952 – 14 May 2023) was a Scottish musician who worked as an acoustic and electric bass player spanning jazz, classical, rock, folk, and avant-garde music. He was a member of Brand X in 1979 and Simple Minds from 1985 to 1988. Giblin also worked as a session musician for a variety of artists including Peter Gabriel, Phil Collins, Kate Bush and Elkie Brooks.

== Career ==
Giblin was a member of jazz-fusion band Brand X in 1979. Although his time with the group was brief, he was involved in the recording of three of their albums during that year - Product, Do They Hurt? and Is There Anything About? - whose releases were spread between 1979 and 1982. Phil Collins was Brand X's drummer at the time, and Giblin would go on to contribute to some of Collins' subsequent solo albums and tours. Giblin was also a touring and session player for Collins' former Genesis bandmate Peter Gabriel during the early 1980s.

Giblin replaced Derek Forbes in the Scottish rock band Simple Minds in 1985, making his first appearance with them at Live Aid. He was with the band for the album Once Upon a Time later that year and the subsequent tour, from which the live album Live in the City of Light was released in 1987. Giblin left the band in 1988 during the recording of the follow-up album, Street Fighting Years.

A prolific studio musician, Giblin also contributed to film scores and contemporary music. As well as Peter Gabriel and Phil Collins, Giblin also recorded and played live with John Martyn, Elkie Brooks, Annie Lennox, Manfred Mann's Earth Band, Empire (featuring Peter Banks) and Fish. He also recorded frequently with Kate Bush, Jon Anderson and Scott Walker.

Later in life, Giblin moved further into the direction of acoustic bass, with projects involving drummer Peter Erskine (of Weather Report), and pianist Alan Pasqua (of Tony Williams Lifetime).

== Death ==
Giblin died from sepsis on 14 May 2023, at the age of 71. Following his death, Kate Bush released a statement, saying: " We've all lost a great man, an unmatchable musician and I've lost my very special friend. My world will never be the same again without him."

== Musical work and collaborations ==
- Brand X (Product, Do They Hurt? and Is There Anything About?)
- Eric Clapton, Sting, Mark Knopfler, Phil Collins (live at Music for Montserrat)
- Peter Gabriel (Peter Gabriel III and Birdy)
- Chris de Burgh (The Lady in Red (Chris de Burgh song))
- Masami Tsuchiya (Mod' Fish, Forest People)
- Kate Bush (50 Words for Snow; Aerial; "Babooshka", Never for Ever; The Sensual World; The Red Shoes; Before the Dawn tour)
- Phil Collins songs including "In the Air Tonight" on Face Value and "You Can't Hurry Love" on Hello, I Must Be Going
- Scott Walker (Tilt)
- Al Green
- Empire with Peter Banks
- Duncan Browne
- Joan Armatrading
- John Lennon ("Grow Old with Me")
- Judie Tzuke
- Annie Lennox (Contrabass on MTV Unplugged, including "Why")
- Roberta Flack
- Paul McCartney (live at the Royal Albert Hall, London)
- The Everly Brothers
- George Martin
- Gerry Rafferty
- Hugh Masekela (Waiting for the Rain, 1985)
- Mavis Staples
- Simple Minds (Once Upon a Time; Live in the City of Light; Street Fighting Years)
- Jon Anderson (Animation and Song of Seven)
- Manfred Mann's Earth Band (Criminal Tango)
- John Martyn including (Grace and Danger & The Church with One Bell)
- Richard Ashcroft
- Franco Battiato
- Saro Cosentino (ital. wiki)
- Eros Ramazzotti
- Claudio Baglioni (Oltre)
- Manolo García
- Fish (Vigil in a Wilderness of Mirrors)
- Alan Parsons (On Air)
- Elkie Brooks (Pearls and Pearls II)
- Jimmy Nail (Crocodile Shoes)
- Wendell (Dell) Richardson
