= Product (Brand X album) =

Studio album by Brand X
- Released: 14 September 1979
- Recorded: April 1979
- Studios: Startling, Ascot, England
- Genre: Jazz fusion
- Length: 46:40
- Labels: Charisma (UK); Passport (USA)
- Producers: Brand X, Colin Green, Neil Kernon

Brand X chronology
Masques (1978)	Product (1979)	Do They Hurt? (1980)

Professional ratings
Review scores
Source	Rating
AllMusic	2.5/5 stars

Product is the fourth studio album by the British jazz fusion group Brand X, originally released in 1979. Recorded simultaneously with its follow-up album Do They Hurt?, Product features Phil Collins back on drums following his absence on Masques, while co-founding keyboardist Robin Lumley returned to being a full member, having been a non-performing producer on Masques. Drummer Mike Clark and bassist John Giblin also appear on this album. Two of the album's tracks - "Soho" and "Wal to Wal" - were largely recorded at Phil Collins' Old Croft home in Shalford, Surrey. The album's first CD release in 1989 featured a different running order to the original LP.

== Track listing ==
Side one
No.	Title	Writer(s)	Length
1.	"Don't Make Waves"	John Goodsall	5:28
2.	"Dance of the Illegal Aliens"	Percy Jones	7:50
3.	"Soho"	Goodsall, Phil Collins	3:38
4.	"...And So to F..."	Collins	6:29

Side two
No.	Title	Writer(s)	Length
5.	"Algon (Where an Ordinary Cup of Drinking Chocolate Costs £8,000,000,000)"	Robin Lumley	6:10
6.	"Rhesus Perplexus"	John Giblin	3:59
7.	"Wal to Wal"	Jones, Giblin	3:09
8.	"Not Good Enough – See Me!"	Jones, Robinson	7:27
9.	"April"	Giblin	2:36
Total length:			46:40

== Personnel ==
=== Musicians ===
- John Goodsall – guitars (1–6, 8, 9), vocals (1, 3, 8)
- Robin Lumley – keyboards (1, 3–6, 9)
- Peter Robinson – keyboards (2, 8)
- John Giblin – bass (1, 3–7, 9)
- Percy Jones – bass (2, 7, 8)
- Phil Collins – drums (1, 3–7, 9), percussion (1, 3–7, 9), vocals (1, 3, 8), drum machine (7)
- Mike Clark – drums (2, 8)
- Morris Pert – percussion (2, 8)

Technical

- Produced by Brand X with Colin Green and Neil Kernon
- Recording engineers – Colin Green, Neil Kernon, Phil Collins (3, 7)
- Remix engineers – Richard Austin, Colin Green, Neil Kernon, Rene Ruocco
- Remixed at Farmyard Studios, Trident, and Startling (June–July 1979)
- Mastered by Ray Staff
- Sleeve design and photos – Hipgnosis/Elgie
- Graphics – Colin Elgie
- Photos of Morris and Peter – Paul Canty/L.F.I.
- Photo of Mike Clark – John Giblin

== Notes ==
- The song "Wal to Wal" is the first recorded song on which Phil Collins used a Roland drum machine. (The first recorded Genesis song on which he used a drum machine is "Duchess".)
- Both "Don't Make Waves" and "Soho" were released as singles and feature Phil Collins on vocals.
- The non-album songs "Pool Room Blues" and "Noddy Goes to Sweden" were outtakes from the Product sessions and used as B-sides to one of the singles. "Noddy Goes to Sweden" was also used on the 1980 album release of Do They Hurt?
