= Brand X =

English jazz fusion band

- Brand X performing on The Old Grey Whistle Test in 1979

Background information
- Origin: London, England
- Genre: Jazz fusion
- Years active: 1974–1981; 1992–1999; 2016–2020
- Labels: Charisma; Passport
- Website: officialbrandx.com

Brand X were a British jazz fusion band formed in London in 1974. Primarily an instrumental band, they were initially active until 1981, followed by reformations during 1992–1999 and 2016–2020.

The band's first recording and touring line-up consisted of guitarist John Goodsall, bassist Percy Jones, keyboardist Robin Lumley and Genesis drummer Phil Collins. Other members of the band at various times included Morris Pert, Kenwood Dennard, Chuck Burgi, J. Peter Robinson, Mike Clark and John Giblin. Goodsall, Jones and Lumley were involved with all the albums during the band's original 1974–1981 run.

Jones ended all Brand X activities in 2020, despite resistance from the band's management and their attempts to revive the band with all-new personnel. John Goodsall died on 10 November 2021 and Robin Lumley died on 9 March 2023.

== History ==
=== 1974–1976: Origins and Unorthodox Behaviour ===
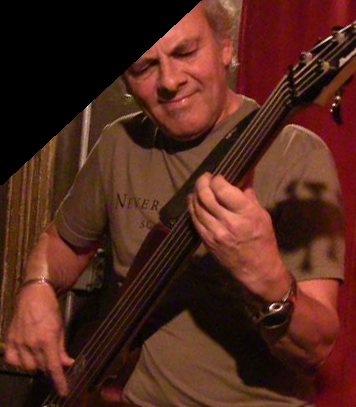
Brand X co-founder Percy Jones

In 1974, Atomic Rooster guitarist John Goodsall plus fellow guitarist Pete Bonas, drummer John Dillon and percussionist/singer Phil Spinelli were carrying out jazz fusion jam sessions at Island Studios in London. Simultaneously, at London's PSL studios, keyboard player Robin Lumley and bass guitarist Percy Jones were playing with the jam band Karass (which also featured members of the Keith Tippett band, Blodwyn Pig, Traffic and Atomic Rooster). Jones and Lumley were introduced to Bonas and Goodsall, who invited them to play at Island Studios, eventually forming a six-piece "Island band" salaried by Island Records under the guidance of A&R man Danny Wilding.

Following the departure of Dillon in 1975, the band attempted to recruit Bill Bruford before being introduced to Genesis drummer Phil Collins (at the time unsure about his future with Genesis following Peter Gabriel's departure). Newly christened Brand X (after Wilding wrote down "Brand X" to keep track of their activity on the studio calendar), the band began recording a debut album featuring Spinelli's vocals in addition to the instrumental content. When the vocals were negatively received by Island management, Goodsall, Lumley, Jones and Collins began secretly rehearsing as an instrumental four-piece, subsequently parting company with Spinelli and Bonas.

Recordings of the four-piece formed the foundation of what would become the band's debut album Unorthodox Behaviour, recorded in September and October 1975 at Trident Studios with Jack Lancaster guesting on saxophone. At the behest of Collins, Genesis manager Tony Smith became Brand X's manager and publisher (via his Hit & Run company) and signed them to Genesis' record label Charisma Records, who bought out their deal with Island. Under this arrangement, Goodsall, Lumley and Jones were the legal members of the group; although Collins was nominally a member, both he and subsequent Brand X musicians were "hired in" via arrangements with Collins' own company and were thereby shielded from legal liabilities.

Brand X played their first gigs with a series of low key warm-up shows in November and December 1975. In preparation for further gigs, the four were joined by Geoff Seopardi on percussion by December 1975. The band began a full-scale tour across the UK from February 1976, mainly on the college circuit. They had little in the way of funds, resorting to renting a synthesiser and PA system and operating with a small road crew, and often played support for the headlining act.

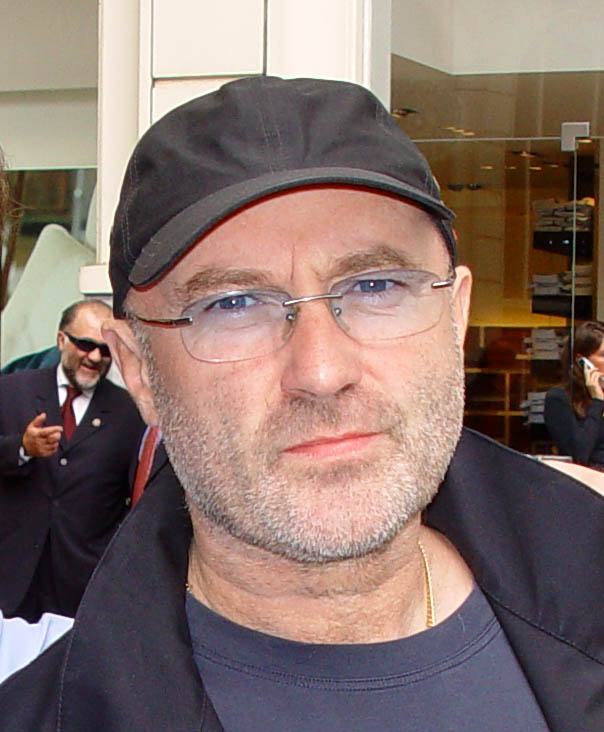
Phil Collins was an on/off member of Brand X during 1975–1979

=== 1977–1978: Moroccan Roll, Livestock and Masques ===
The band recorded their second album, Moroccan Roll, with percussionist Morris Pert added to the line-up. The album was released in April 1977 and peaked at No. 37 in the UK and No. 125 in the US. With Collins leaving the group for Genesis commitments, Kenwood Dennard of Pat Martino's group was recruited in New York City in time for their 32-date US tour in May and June 1977. Collins briefly returned later in 1977 for a series of dates, including a spot at the tenth Crystal Palace Garden Party in London and the Fête de l'Humanité in Paris on the same day on a specially chartered plane, the latter attended by an estimated 200,000 people. Livestock, a live album culled from several shows (some with Collins and some with Dennard), was released in November 1977, and won the "Best Live Recording" in Melody Maker at the end of the same year.

Following the 1977 tour, Brand X parted company with Lumley by mutual consent: Lumley wished to concentrate on record production, and the band was now aiming to make music which would work better in the American jazz fusion market which had previously embraced Weather Report and Mahavishnu Orchestra. Lumley's replacement as keyboard player was J. Peter Robinson. The band also hired a new drummer, Chuck Burgi, with Morris Pert now adding electric piano to his own instrumental duties.

This line-up recorded the Masques album, which was produced by Lumley and released in 1978. It was the only Brand X album during the band's original run without Phil Collins. Pert remained onboard for the subsequent tour, although Burgi did not: the band performed with a number of alternative live drummers. Goodsall was obliged to sit out part of the European and American tour due to a severe case of tendonitis, so Brand X brought in American session guitarist Mike Miller to cover for him in concert, although Goodsall continued as a member of the touring party ("to monitor the comings and goings, and to keep an eye on the cash"). Goodsall would later participate in certain shows on the 1978 tour, dependent on the state of his recovery and the performance anxieties relating to it.

=== 1979–1981: Double line-up, Product and Do They Hurt? ===
In 1979, Goodsall was fully recovered and able to join the band for a follow-up American tour, now minus Pert but with Phil Collins back on drums after a two-year absence. Lumley returned to Brand X during the same year, becoming part of a dual keyboard team alongside Robinson.

Due to their deals with Charisma Records and Hit & Run Publishing, Brand X had been able to enjoy a working lifestyle and tour support closer to that of a contemporary rock band than to that of a jazz band, including being able to take advantage of the services of Hipgnosis, whose artwork adorned the covers of their 1970s albums. Members have admitted that this facilitated "outrageous, sometimes destructive behavior", as well as helping them to fund and schedule rehab treatment for John Goodsall's "severe (but functional)" heroin addiction, which provided the band with another challenge.

Disappointing record sales, however, led to more external pressure from Charisma, Hit & Run and the band's American distributor Passport Records, all of whom (post-Masques) began pushing for the band to add songs and horn sections to their music to make it more commercially viable. This eventually led to Brand X beginning to operate with two line-ups during 1979. While Goodsall has stated that this was in order to cope with musician unavailability or scheduling problems, Jones cited his own battles with label and publisher demands, in particular those of Hit & Run.

The double line-up began following two weeks of the existing line-up carrying out "managerially-pressured" rehearsals at Rupert Hines' Farmyard Studio. With Jones disgruntled and briefly absent (having been determined that Brand X should create music without "pandering" to external demands), Goodsall began working with bassist John Giblin (whom Jones would much later describe as having been "brought in to fill a few parts which [Jones] had no interest in playing.") In order to pacify Charisma, Robin Lumley had obtained a favourable deal to rent Ringo Starr's Startling Studios in Ascot and pledged to record two albums there during the time usually required for just one.

During the day, a line-up of Robin Lumley, John Goodsall, Phil Collins and John Giblin recorded material with a more vocally-orientated and "rockier" aspect; during the night, a line-up of Goodsall, the returned Percy Jones, Peter Robinson, and drummer Mike Clark (sometimes joined by Morris Pert) recorded in the ongoing less commercial Brand X style that Jones favoured. During this tense period, Goodsall held what would be described as "a middle ground" with his compositions and attempts to hold the group together by being the persistent element, while other group members who overlapped the sessions "chose not to make waves". Jones has subsequently said that the results were "schizophrenic" and that "there was really no another solution, apart from me to concede to Hit & Run. I have thought about the situation since and I probably would have done the same thing again. It became a musical marketing construct, actually. As for whether it worked, the proof was in the pudding."

The Startling Studios sessions produced two immediate albums: 1979's Product and 1980's Do They Hurt?. Product also generated a single, "Don’t Make Waves" - composed by Goodsall and sung by Collins (and inspired by the difficult band politics of the time). It charted in both the UK and the USA. Michael Palin wrote the liner notes for Do They Hurt?. A concert line-up of Goodsall, Jones, Collins, Lumley, and Robinson embarked on a world tour, after which Collins departed for the final time (continuing with Genesis and eventually launching a solo career). Clark returned to the drum stool for the final Brand X tours of the UK in April and May 1980 and in 1981 (for which they co-headlined with Bruford): for these tours, Lumley alternated with Robinson as the keyboard player.

=== 1981–1991: Band split ===
Brand X dissolved in 1981, with Robin Lumley stating that "there were no hard feelings; we just ran out of music to write together." Other issues affecting the band, however, included the impact of a long-running legal case between Charisma and Island Records, plus the release of Goodsall and Jones from Hit & Run management contracts. Percy Jones relocated to New York City, while John Goodsall moved to Los Angeles to become a session musician. Lumley returned to production, as well as forming another jazz-rock band including former Brand X percussionist Morris Pert. J. Peter Robinson would continue with a career as session keyboard player, arranger and eventually film music composer. Mike Clark would continue his work as a jazz drummer.

A final Brand X album from this period, Is There Anything About?, would be released in 1982. This consisted of rough mixes and demos from the Startling Studios double-line-up sessions, and was put together by Lumley at the behest of Charisma Records. The band have subsequently described it as "leftover compositions" and "mostly rubbish".

=== 1992–2019: Reunions ===
In 1992, Jones was planning a solo album on the Ozone Records label with contributions from drummer Frank Katz, and invited Goodsall to contribute guitar parts. At the record label's behest (and to Jones and Goodsall's reluctance) the project was reconceived as a Brand X reunion. An album X-Communication was assembled "hastily", with Jones playing keyboards as well as bass, and with the band's old ally Danny Wilding contributing flute: it was released in 1992, to mixed reviews, and disappointing commercial returns. The band toured, mostly on the West Coast of the US, where John Goodsall lived. A compilation album, The Plot Thins: A History of Brand X, was also released in 1992.

In 1997, the Jones/Goodsall/Katz line-up was reactivated to record and tour the album Manifest Destiny. Keyboard player Franz Pusch contributed to the album, as did vibraphonist Marc Wagnon (Jones' bandmate in Tunnels), and Danny Wilding on flute. Gong drummer Pierre Moerlen replaced Katz for the Manifest Destiny tour. Manifest Destiny would prove to be the last album of new Brand X material.

2012 saw an abortive attempt to reunite the band with Goodsall, Jones and keyboard player David Sancious. The management for this line-up were unable to organise the necessary concerts and touring, resulting in Sancious withdrawing. For a while, former Yes/Moody Blues keyboard player Patrick Moraz was in the frame to replace Sancious, but continuing problems in arranging concerts resulted in this line-up foundering as well.

The band reunited once more in July 2016 with a line-up of Goodsall, Jones and Kenwood Dennard joined by keyboard player Chris Clark and percussionist/producer Scott Weinberger (with Dennard later replaced by Kenny Grohowski).

=== 2020–present day: Final split and aftermath ===
After bassist Percy Jones refused to continue performing live with Brand X in 2020, Jeff Berlin was briefly announced as his replacement, but quickly backed out. Jones says that Berlin, and other bassists, refused offers to join Brand X because they were warned about unethical behavior of management.

Following John Goodsall's death in November 2021, Percy Jones and Robin Lumley confirmed on Facebook on 14 November that the Brand X name was now officially retired, and that no further activity would be done under that name. In a 2022 interview, Jones explained that he left the band due to tensions with management and percussionist Scott Weinberger. Jones alleges that the band's management has used the Brand X Facebook account to misrepresent the band's status following Goodsall's death and the official retirement of the name. The recent history of the band is explained on their official website which is endorsed by Jones.

In 2026, the band (now being represented by Jones only after Lumley's death in 2023) released a live recording from the 1977 North American tour. The two-track tape was found in Lumley's personal collection. The album titled Theory of Nothing was distributed via MoonJune Records.

== Discography ==
Studio albums

- Unorthodox Behaviour (18 June 1976)
- Moroccan Roll (22 April 1977) - UK No. 37, US No. 125
- Masques (8 September 1978)
- Product (14 September 1979) - US No. 165
- Do They Hurt? (18 April 1980) - US No. 204
- Is There Anything About? (September 1982) - outtakes from the Product and Do They Hurt? sessions - UK No. 93
- X-Communication (1992)
- Manifest Destiny (1997)
- Missing Period (1997) - recorded circa 1975-76

Live albums

- Livestock (18 November 1977) - recorded at various shows during 1976 and 1977 - US No. 204
- Live at the Roxy L.A. (1997) - recorded 23 September 1979 (taken from a band members' cassette from the venue's PA mixing desk)
- Timeline (2000) - recorded 16 November 1977 Chicago & 21 June 1993 NYC
- But Wait... There's More! - LIVE 2017 (2017) - recorded on 6 January 2017 at the Sellersville Theatre, PA
- Locked & Loaded (2018) - recorded June 2017, Longs Park Amphitheater, Lancaster, Pennsylvania
- Live from the Rites of Spring Festival (2018) - recorded on 6 May 2018, at the Majestic Theatre, Gettysburg, Pennsylvania
- Theory of Nothing (2026) - recorded during the 1977 North American tour.

Compilation albums

- The Plot Thins: A History of Brand X (26 October 1992) - select tracks from Unorthodox Behaviour, Moroccan Roll, Livestock, Masques, Product and Do They Hurt?

== Members ==
Principle members

- Percy Jones - bass guitar (1974–1981, 1992–1997, 2016–2020)
- John Goodsall - guitars (1974–1978, 1979–1981, 1992–1999, 2016–2020; died 2021)
- Robin Lumley - keyboards (1974–1978, 1979–1981; died 2023)
- Phil Collins - drums (1975–1976, 1977, 1979)
- Morris Pert - percussion (1976–1979; died 2010)
- Kenwood Dennard - drums (1977–1978, 2016–2017)
- J. Peter Robinson - keyboards (1978–1981)
- Chuck Burgi - drums (1978)
- Mike Clark - drums (1978–1979, 1980–1981)
- John Giblin - bass guitar (1979; died 2023)

Goodsall died on 10 November 2021, at the Mayo Clinic in Rochester, Minnesota. The cause of death was determined to be COVID-19 disease. (Note: In relation to John Goodsall's illness and the cause of death, erroneous information was initially given on the internet. It was known that John Goodsall had to go to the hospital for pneumonia in September 2021, but this was not the reason for his demise.) Lumley died on 9 March 2023 from heart failure.

The official Brand X website has asserted that the only official legal members of Brand X since its 1992 reformation were original members Jones, Goodsall, and Lumley. All other musicians during this time period are described as legally being "employees" and "guests".
