= Tony Smith (band manager) =

British music band manager (born 1945)

John Anthony "Tony" Smith (born January 1945) is a British manager and music and film producer. He was talent manager for the rock band Genesis, for the solo careers of Phil Collins, Mike Rutherford and Tony Banks, and for Pink Floyd's Nick Mason and his band Nick Mason's Saucerful of Secrets.

In his early career Smith promoted shows with acts such as the Beatles, the Rolling Stones and the Who. He went on to co-found (with Jon Crawley) the Hit & Run Music Publishing house in 1977, located in the United Kingdom. Along with Hilary Shor, he has expanded into film production under the name Hit and Run Productions. As a film producer, he has produced Eye of the Beholder (1999) and Children of Men (2006).

In 2000, the Music Managers Foundation presented him with the Peter Grant Award.

Smith is a historic car racer and has owned an Aston Martin DB4 GT Zagato Sanction II Coupe, one of only four ever made, which in 2012 was auctioned by Bonhams for a record-breaking £1.2 million with fees.
