= Percy Jones (musician) =

Welsh bass guitarist (born 1947)

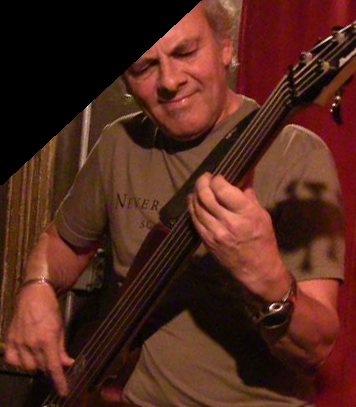

Background information
- Born: 3 December 1947 (age 78) near Llandrindod Wells, Wales
- Occupation: Bassist
- Instrument: Bass guitar

Percy Jones (born 3 December 1947) is a Welsh bass guitarist best known as a member of the jazz rock ensemble Brand X, with whom he played during three stints: 1974 to 1980, 1992 to 1999, and 2016-2020, with the group ending shortly before the passing of their founding guitarist John Goodsall in 2021.

Jones, who was born near Llandrindod Wells, has also done extensive work as a session musician, and has been active with other groups. He played with a trio called Stone Tiger (featuring guitarist Bill Frisell) in 1982/83. Jones was also one of the driving forces behind Tunnels, a fusion collective which released four albums between 1994-2006. While residing in New York, he also worked with the improvising group MJ12.

Jones was also briefly a member of the group Soft Machine in 1976, the "poetry rock" group The Liverpool Scene (featuring poet Adrian Henri) in the late 1960s, and has contributed to albums by prominent artists such as Kate Bush, David Sylvian, Brian Eno, Steve Hackett, Suzanne Vega, Richard Barbieri, Fovea Hex, Mark Wingfield, and Paranoise, amongst others.

He released the solo album Cape Catastrophe in 1990. In 2021, he started touring and recording with an improvisational ensemble called PAKT, featuring guitarists Alex Skolnick and Tim Motzer, and drummer Kenny Grohowski.

== Artistry ==
Jones's playing style incorporates an unconventional three-finger right hand technique to pluck the strings (like Les Claypool and, before him, John Entwistle), in contrast to most bassists using two fingers. He also employs sliding harmonics. Over the years, he has employed various other extended techniques, such as deliberately pulling the strings (5 string bass) over the edges of the fingerboard (creating a distinctive buzzing rattle) and thumb-on-the-fingerboard left hand technique to achieve wider-interval double stops than are normally possible.

His first recordings with Brand X employed a fretless Fender Precision bass, though he later switched to what became his trademark Wal basses, produced by Electric Wood Limited in the UK. More recently, Jones switched to custom-built Ibanez basses, citing a desire to simply try something different after many successful years using the Wal.

The uniqueness of his technique and his outsider melodic sensibilities, particularly with Brand X and on his contributions to Brian Eno's Another Green World and Before and After Science LPs of the 1970s, cast a long shadow. Perhaps the most obvious example of this can be clearly seen in the work of Japan bassist Mick Karn, who acknowledged Jones as an influence at various times during his career.

He has cited Charles Mingus, Danny Thompson, Paul Chambers, Jimmy Garrison, Scott LaFaro, Miroslav Vitouš, Niels-Henning Ørsted Pedersen, Cliff Barton, Alphonso Johnson, and Jaco Pastorius as bass playing influences, and has expressed admiration for many British blues bands.

== Electronics work ==
Jones studied Electronic Engineering at the University of Liverpool, and has used his electronics skills to potent effect in music over the years. In the late 1970s, he designed and built various analog signal processors for use with his bass guitar, perhaps the most unusual of which was an amplitude- and frequency-sensitive flanger that would vary the character of its flanging effect based on what notes were being played into it, and how loudly they were being played. He also designed an envelope-controlled VCF (Voltage Controlled Filter), which can be heard to good effect on "Noddy Goes to Sweden" from Brand X's 1980 album Do They Hurt?, as well as an analog drum machine, which featured preset rhythms in various (odd) time signatures, such as 15/16.

Jones is an avid amateur radio operator and has developed several innovative, compact antenna designs for the HF bands utilized by amateur radio.

== Discography ==
=== Solo ===
- Propeller Music (1990)
- Cape Catastrophe (1990)
- The Bang (1991; later rereleased as Bang! in 2011) with Tim Berne, Bobby Previte, Mark Feldman, Herb Robertson, and Matteo Ederle
- Percy Jones and Tunnel (1993) with Tunnel
- Percy Jones Scott McGill Ritchie DeCarlo (2010) with Scott McGill and Ritchie DeCarlo

=== With Brand X ===
==== Studio ====
- Unorthodox Behaviour (1976)
- Moroccan Roll (1977)
- Masques (1978)
- Product (1979)
- Do They Hurt? (1980)
- Is There Anything About? (1982)
- Xcommunication (1992)
- Manifest Destiny (1997)
- Missing Period (1998)

==== Live ====
- Livestock (1977)
- Live at the Roxy LA (1979, released 1995)
- Live from Chicago (2015)
- Live from Stockholm (2016)
- But Wait, There's Still more! (2017)
- Locked and Loaded (2018)

==== Compilation ====
- The Plot Thins: A History of Brand X (1992)
- X-Files: A 20 Year Retrospective (1999), compilation including side projects
- Timeline (2000)
- Trilogy (2003)
