= Robin Lumley =

British musician (1948–2023)

Robin Lumley (17 January 1948 – 9 March 2023) was a British jazz fusion musician, keyboardist, record producer, and author who was a member of the band Brand X with drummer Phil Collins, guitarist John Goodsall, and bassist Percy Jones. He was a second cousin of the actress Joanna Lumley.

== Life and career ==
Lumley was born in the Alexandra Nursing Home, Devonport, Plymouth, Devon. After attending Plympton Grammar School (now Hele's School, Plympton) he trained as a teacher at St. Luke's College, Exeter (now part of Exeter University). He started playing drums in a student band at college. The band reached the finals of the Melody Maker talent contest in the early 1970s, after which he switched to keyboards.

He then moved to London and did odd jobs while trying to get into the music business. One day he received a phone call from David Bowie, a former neighbour, looking for someone to replace his ill keyboard player. Lumley accepted the job and toured as a member of Bowie's band. He met Jack Lancaster and starting doing session work recording for others. Among the musicians he encountered was Phil Collins of Genesis, with whom he founded Brand X and became interested in music producing. From 1974 to 1983, he was the keyboard player for Brand X. He took leave from the band in 1978 to concentrate on his career as a record producer but returned for the band's final albums and tours. He also produced albums for Rod Argent, Bill Bruford, and Orleans.

In the 1980s, he formed a jazz-rock band that included Rod Argent, Graeme Edge (of the Moody Blues), Morris Pert (of Brand X), and Gary Brooker (of Procol Harum). In 1991 he married Debra Allanson, a media executive and television presenter from Perth, Australia. In 2000 he produced a set of instruction videos with Roland Corporation on keyboard technique. In 2001 he formed the band SETI with Graeme Edge, bassist Rob Burns, and Rod McGrath (cellist for the West Australian Symphony Orchestra).

Lumley wrote the book Tay Bridge Disaster: The People's Story about the collapse of the Tay Bridge in 1879 while a train was attempting to cross it. The train was headed to Dundee, Scotland, and his great-grandfather had intended to board the train.

Lumley died from heart failure in Plymouth, on 9 March 2023, at the age of 75.

== Discography ==
=== As leader ===
- 1975 Peter & The Wolf with Jack Lancaster
- 1976 Marscape with Jack Lancaster

With Brand X

- 1976 Unorthodox Behaviour
- 1977 Moroccan Roll
- 1977 Livestock
- 1978 Masques
- 1979 Product
- 1980 Do They Hurt?
- 1982 Is There Anything About?
- 1992 The Plot Thins: A History of Brand X
- 1997 Live at the Roxy L.A. 1979
- 1998 Missing Period
- 2003 Macrocosm: Introducing...Brand X
- 2015 Ronnie Scotts Live 1976
- 2016 Rochester 1977

=== As sideman ===
- 1976 Airborne Curved Air
- 1977 The Dancer, Gary Boyle
- 1980 Breaking through the Ice Age, Ellen Shipley
- 1983 Exile, Exile
