= Tregenza =

Tregenza is a Cornish surname. It derives from Tregenza in the parish of Creed; Tregenza is formed from the elements "tre" (homestead) and "kensyth" (meaning unknown). Tregenna, Tregensoe, Tregensowe, and Tregenzo are possibly related names.

Notable people with the surname include:

- Norman Tregenza, Republican member of the New Hampshire House of Representatives
- Rob Tregenza (born 1950), American cinematographer and film director
- Rod Tregenza (born 1979), Australian rules footballer
- Sharon Tregenza, British children's author
- Simon Tregenza (born 1971), Australian rules footballer
- Jo Tregenza (born 1965), Associate Professor at Sussex University, President of United Kingdom Literacy Association

== See also ==
- Tregenza Roach, Kittitian-American politician, attorney, and former journalist
- Henry Tregenza Jullion, Anglican priest and author
- Alberto O. Treganza, American architect and ornithologist
  - Ware & Treganza, American architectural firm
