= Sunday Football League =

Sunday Football League may refer to:

- Sunday Football League (2024), an Australian football league based in Perth, Australia, that was formerly known as the Metro Football League (2012–2023) and the Mercantile Football Association (1993–2011)
- Sunday Football League (1984–2008), an Australian football league based in Perth, Australia
- Sunday Football League (Lithuania), an amateur football league based in Lithuania
