= Sunday League =

Sunday League may refer to:

- Sunday League (cricket), the precursor tournament to the National League in English cricket
- Sunday league football, amateur football played on Sundays in the United Kingdom
- Sunday Football League, former semi-professional Australian rules football league
