= 1921 SNETA Farman Goliath ditching =

Air accident over the English Channel

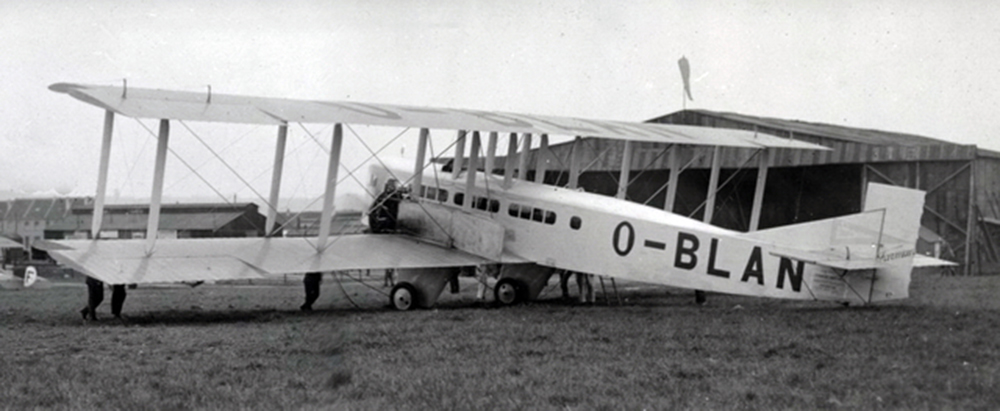
- O-BLAN, the F.60 involved in the accident.

Accident
- Date: August 26, 1921
- Site: English Channel off the coast of France; 51°3′0″N 2°3′0″E

Aircraft
- Aircraft type: Farman F.60 Goliath
- Operator: SNETA
- Registration: O-BLAN
- Flight origin: Croydon Airport, United Kingdom
- Destination: Brussels-Evere Airport, Belgium
- Crew: 2
- Missing: 2

The 1921 SNETA Farman Goliath ditching occurred on 26 August 1921 when a Farman F.60 Goliath of Syndicat National d'Étude des Transports Aériens ditched in the North Sea off the coast of France. The aircraft was operating a mail flight from Croydon Airport, United Kingdom to Brussels-Evere Airport, Belgium. The aircraft — whose wreckage later was reported to be off the coast of Belgium — was salvaged, repaired, and returned to service.

== Aircraft and crew ==
The accident aircraft was Farman F.60 Goliath O-BLAN, msn 7248/17. The crew consisted of pilot Paul Delsenne, a French Air Force aviator, and mechanic Raymond Rijckers.

== Ditching ==
The aircraft, operated by Syndicat National d'Étude des Transports Aériens (SNETA), was operating a mail flight from Croydon Airport, United Kingdom to Brussels-Evere Airport, Belgium. It had departed from Croydon at 12:25. One witness, a gendarme, reported hearing "an explosion" at 13:32 and seeing the structural collapse of the aircraft before it came down in the English Channel 3 nautical miles (5.6 km) off Calais, France. The accident was reported by the gendarme by telegraph to Calais. The report was passed on to the Gendarmerie at Boulogne and Gravelines. Various fishing boats, yachts and submarines were dispatched to search for the aircraft. The wreckage was located 3 nautical miles (5.6 km) off the coast. The accident was also witnessed by Herbert Sullivan, on board the yacht Zola. He sent a radiogram reporting the accident. A bag of mail was recovered by Sullivan, it was subsequently forwarded to authorities in Brussels. The South Eastern and Chatham Railway ship Maid of Orleans received the radiogram and relayed it to the General Post Office in London. The wreckage of the aircraft was later reported by the steamship Tregenna to be off the coast of Belgium (51°03′N 2°03′E). Both crew, pilot and mechanic, were reported as missing. The accident was the first involving the Farman Goliath in civil service.
