= Peel Football League =

Australian rules football league

Peel Football and Netball League Inc.
- Sport: Australian rules football
- Founded: 1992
- President: Darren Dews
- No. of teams: 9
- Most recent champion: Rockingham (2) (2026)
- Most titles: Pinjarra (8)
- Sponsor: Alcoa

The Peel Football League (PFL) is a country football league based in the Peel region of Western Australia. The competition was formed in 1992 when teams from the Metropolitan Football League and Murray Districts Football League merged. There are currently eight clubs fielding a league reserves and colts team.

== The formation years ==
The Metropolitan Football League (MFL) was a predecessor to the PFL and competed from 1988 to 1991 under the administration of the Sunday Football League. The six founding MFL teams in 1988 were Kwinana, Manning, Midland, Mosman Park, North Fremantle and Cockburn. In 1989, the MFL grew from 6 teams to 8 teams with the inclusion of Mundijong Centrals and Pinjarra. These two teams were previously competing in the Murray Districts Football League (along with Harvey Town, South Mandurah and Waroona).

The MFL gained another two teams in 1990, with the admission of South Mandurah and Waroona, who were forced to join the league when the Murray Districts Football League disbanded at the end of the 1989 season. Cockburn also did not compete in 1990, but re-entered for the final year of the MFL in 1991.

In 1992, the ten MFL teams broke ties with the Sunday Football League and combined with Mandurah (from the Sunday Football League) and Belmont to form the new Peel Football League (PFL). In 1994, Midland, Mosman Park, Manning, North Fremantle, Cockburn and Belmont left the PFL to form Division 2 of the Sunday Football League (along with a new club from Kingsley). However, the loss of these six teams was offset by the admission of Rockingham (from the WA Amateur Football League) and a new team from Harvey.

The information above was sourced from Sunday Football League Yearbooks and Westside Football Newspapers.

== Clubs ==
=== Locations ===
Locations of the Peel FNL clubs. Yellow clubs only field women's sides.

=== Current ===
Club	Colours	Nickname	Home Ground	Former League	Est.	Years in PFNL	PFNL Premierships	
Club	Colours	Nickname	Home Ground	Former League	Est.	Years in PFNL	Total	Years
Centrals		Blues	Mundijong Oval, Mundijong	MFL	1909	1992-	6	1992, 1999, 2000, 2007, 2023, 2024
Halls Head		Lightning	Merlin Street Reserve, Falcon	–	1999	2008-	0	-
HMAS Stirling		Pussers	HMAS Stirling, Garden Island	–	2023	2023-	0	-
Mandurah Mustangs		Mustangs	Rushton Park, Mandurah	SFL	1927	1992-	3	1993, 1995, 2003
Pinjarra		Tigers	Sir Ross McLarty Oval, Pinjarra	MFL	1911	1992-	8	1994, 2001, 2002, 2013, 2014, 2017, 2018, 2022
Rockingham		Rams	Anniversary Park, Rockingham	WAAFL	1954	1994-	2	1997, 2026
Secret Harbour		Dockers	Rhonda Scarrott Oval, Golden Bay	PFL	2011	2024-	0	-
South Mandurah		Falcons	Falcon Oval, Falcon	MFL	1982	1992-	6	1998, 2006, 2008, 2015, 2021, 2025
Waroona		Demons	Waroona Oval, Waroona	MFL	1930	1992-	4	2009, 2010, 2011, 2012

=== Former ===
Club	Colours	Nickname	Home Ground	Former League	Est.	Years in PFNL	PFNL Premierships		Fate
Club	Colours	Nickname	Home Ground	Former League	Est.	Years in PFNL	Total	Years	Fate
Armadale		Demons	Gwynne Park, Armadale	SFL	1909	2009	0	-	Moved to WAAFL in 2010
Baldivis		Brumbies	Baldivis Sports Complex, Baldivis	–	2006	2006-2020	2	2016, 2019	Moved to PFL in 2021
Belmont		Bombers	Forster Park, Cloverdale	HFA	1991	1992-1993	0	-	Moved to Sunday FL Division 2 in 1994
Cockburn Saints		Saints	Davilak Reserve, Hamilton Hill	MFL	1967	1992-1993	0	-	Moved to Sunday FL Division 2 in 1994 (as Cockburn Eagles)
Dwellingup		Razorbacks	Dwellingup Oval, Dwellingup	MFL	1993	2019-2021	0	-	Returned to Metro FL in 2022
Harvey Bulls		Bulls	Harvey Oval, Harvey	–	1994	1994-2008	3	1996, 2004, 2005	Moved to South West FL in 2009
Kwinana		Knights	Medina Oval, Medina	MFL	1962	1992-2005	0	-	Left competition 3 games into 2005, after poor results, lack of players and financial difficulties. Re-formed in Mercantile FL in 2006
Manning		Maroons	James Miller Oval, Manning	MFL	1986	1992-1993	0	-	Moved to Sunday FL Division 2 in 1994
Midland		Tigers	Midland Oval, Midland	MFL	1946	1992-1993	0	-	Moved to Sunday FL Division 2 in 1994
Mosman Park		Mossies	Tom Perrott Reserve, Mosman Park	MFL	1921	1992-1993	0	-	Moved to Sunday FL Division 2 in 1994
North Fremantle		Magpies	Gil Fraser Reserve, North Fremantle	MFL	1928	1992-1993	0	-	Moved to Sunday FL Division 2 in 1994
North Mandurah		Magpies	Lakelands Reserve, Lakelands	–	2019	2019-2021	0	-	Moved to PFL in 2022
Safety Bay		Stingers	Stan Twight Reserve, Rockingham	MFL	2010	2020-2021	0	-	Returned to Metro FL in 2022

== Most League Games Played ==
Courtney Lakay (Waroona) - 334*

Jasan Hysen (Waroona) - 316

Matthew Ray (Mundijong) - 314

Stephen Martin (Pinjarra) - 314*

Rhys Bloxsidge (Waroona) - 274*

Mathew Thomas (Waroona) - 254

Jake Lally (Halls Head) - 240*

== Grand final results ==
League

Year	Premiers	Score	Runners up	Score
1992	Mundijong Centrals	17.12.114	Mandurah	10.9.69
1993	Mandurah	9.11.65	Pinjarra	8.7.55
1994	Pinjarra	16.9.105	Mandurah	8.6.54
1995	Mandurah	19.22.136	Harvey	18.14.122
1996	Harvey	9.9.63	Rockingham	8.12.60
1997	Rockingham	14.17.101	Pinjarra	7.5.47
1998	South Mandurah	16.6.102	Mundijong Centrals	12.15.87
1999	Mundijong Centrals	13.10.88	Harvey	8.8.56
2000	Mundijong Centrals	14.10.94	Harvey	10.6.66
2001	Pinjarra	14.11.95	Mundijong Centrals	7.7.49
2002	Pinjarra	9.9.63	Mandurah	6.13.49
2003	Mandurah	11.8.74	Pinjarra	9.9.63
2004	Harvey	14.10.94	Pinjarra	9.5.59
2005	Harvey	16.17.113	Rockingham	3.15.33
2006	South Mandurah	15.14.104	Waroona	9.7.61
2007	Mundijong Centrals	13.7.85	South Mandurah	8.8.56
2008	South Mandurah	26.16.172	Mundijong Centrals	5.5.35
2009	Waroona	15.12.102	South Mandurah	12.11.83
2010	Waroona	20.18.138	Mandurah	7.2.44
2011	Waroona	16.7.103	Rockingham	8.7.55
2012	Waroona	8.7.55	Rockingham	7.9.51
2013	Pinjarra	15.14.104	Waroona	12.7.79
2014	Pinjarra	14.7.91	Mundijong Centrals	12.13. 85
2015	South Mandurah	13.6.84	Waroona	10.5. 65
2016	Baldivis	10.7.67	Waroona	9.8. 62
2017	Pinjarra	14.12.96	Waroona	8.7.55
2018	Pinjarra	13.7.85	Centrals	5.12.42
2019	Baldivis	11.10.76	Rockingham	5.7.37
2020	No competition due to Covid-19			
2021	South Mandurah	6.9.45	Rockingham	5.9.39
2022	Pinjarra	10.12.72	Mundijong Centrals	8.5.53
2023	Mundijong Centrals	7.8.50	Pinjarra	6.9.45
2024	Mundijong Centrals	11.10.76	South Mandurah	8.7.55
2025	South Mandurah	9.7.61	Rockingham	7.14.56
2026	Rockingham	14.6.90	Pinjarra	8.9.57

== Premierships ==
Club	League total	League premiers	Reserves total	Reserves premiers	Colts total	Colts premiers	Women's total	Women's premiers
Baldivis	2	2016, 2019	1	2017	1	2013	0	-
Halls Head	0	-	1	2015	6	2009, 2011, 2015, 2021, 2022, 2023	0	-
Harvey	3	1996, 2004, 2005	2	2000, 2002	0	-	0	-
Mandurah	3	1993, 1995, 2003	6	1992, 1993, 1994, 2003, 2004, 2010	8	1993, 1994, 1999, 2001, 2022, 2003, 2005, 2012	0	-
Mundijong Centrals	6	1992, 1999, 2000, 2007, 2023, 2024	1	2008	0	-	0	-
Pinjarra	8	1994, 2001, 2002, 2013, 2014, 2017, 2018, 2022	1	2011	2	1996, 2018	2	2022, 2023
Rockingham	2	1997, 2026	10	1995, 1996, 1997, 1998, 1999, 2001, 2005, 2006, 2019, 2021, 2022	8	1998, 2000, 2004, 2006, 2008, 2010, 2019, 2024	0	-
Secret Harbour	0	-	0	-	0	-	2	2024, 2025
South Mandurah	6	1998, 2006, 2008, 2015, 2021, 2025	7	2007, 2009, 2013, 2018, 2023, 2024, 2025	6	1995, 1997, 2007, 2016, 2017, 2025	0	-
Waroona	4	2009-2012	3	2012, 2014, 2016	0	-	0	-

== Honour board ==
League
	Premiers	Premiership coach	Runners up	Minor premiers	Wooden spoon	B/F	R/U B/F	GF BOG	Leading goal kicker	Budget Player Of The Year Mandurah Mail
1992	Centrals	Ric Ellard	Mandurah	Mandurah	Kwinana	Ric Ellard (Centrals)			Brad Graham (Mundijong) 75	
1993	Mandurah		Pinjarra	Mandurah	Manning	Des Hayward (Mandurah)			Clint Roberts (Mosman Park) 87	
1994	Pinjarra		Mandurah	Mandurah	Kwinana	Brad Perry (Mandurah)			Rob Lawson (Mandurah) 82	
1995	Mandurah	Haydn Bunton	Harvey	Mandurah	Centrals	Peter Humes (Kwinana)	Brendon Baker (Rockingham)		Kurnutt Thorne (Kwinana)	N/A
1996	Harvey	Mark Bayliss	Rockingham	Harvey	Centrals	Clinton Dennis (Mandurah)		Ned Fimmano (Harvey)	Rob Lawson (Mandurah)	
1997	Rockingham	Mark Watson	Pinjarra	Rockingham		Brendan Baker (Rockingham)			S Johnson	
1998	South Mandurah	Bob Maher	Centrals	South Mandurah		Bruno Italiano (Harvey)	Aaron Jeffery (Centrals)		Rod Tregenza (South Mandurah) (161)	
1999	Centrals	Terry Richardson	Harvey			Aaron Jeffery (Centrals)	Kieren Ugle (Rockingham)	Brad Oldfield (Centrals)	R Walsh	
2000	Centrals	Terry Richardson	Harvey	Harvey	Kwinana	Cam Allen (Harvey)	Brendon Braithwaite (Rockingham); Patrick Young (Waroona)	Clarry Green (Centrals)	Mark Bayliss (Harvey)	Bruno Italiano (Harvey)
2001	Pinjarra	Troy Wilson	Centrals	Pinjarra	Kwinana	Rob Lawson (Mandurah)			Phil Gilbert (Pinjarra)	
2002	Pinjarra	Phil Gilbert	Mandurah	Pinjarra	South Mandurah	Bruce Briene (Pinjarra)	Todd Nancarrow (Pinjarra)	Todd Nancarrow (Pinjarra)	Leon Harris (Kwinana)	Cam Allen (Harvey)
2003	Mandurah	Bill Lawler	Pinjarra	Mandurah		Richard Leigh(Pinjarra)	Peter Miller (Pinjarra)	Matt Liddell (Mandurah)	Joe Smith (Waroona) (75)	Ricky Jetta (Kwinana); Leon Demarte (Mandurah)
2004	Harvey	Ned Fimmano	Pinjarra	Harvey	South Mandurah	Nathan Burridge (Harvey)	Ryan Redfern (Harvey)	Nathan Burridge (Harvey)	Sam Hart (Kwinana) (98)	Ricky Jetta (Kwinana)
2005	Harvey	Ned Fimmano	Rockingham	Rockingham	Pinjarra	Ryan Redfern (Harvey)	Dean Taylor (Waroona)	Ryan Redfern (Harvey)	Sam Hart (Rockingham) (65)	Mark Cherubino (Harvey)
2006	South Mandurah	Sean Wrigley	Waroona	Rockingham	Harvey	Greg Sanders (Rockingham)		Scott Simister (South Mandurah)	Rod Tregenza (South Mandurah) (172)	
2007	Centrals	Aaron Jeffery	South Mandurah	South Mandurah	Pinjarra	Jason Morgan (Centrals)	Rowan Arnott (South Mandurah)	Jason Morgan (Centrals)	Rod Tregenza (South Mandurah) (124)	Scott Franklin (Rockingham)
2008	South Mandurah	Sean Wrigley	Centrals	South Mandurah	Mandurah	Matthew Ware (Rockingham)	Matthew Giumelli (Waroona)		Rod Tregenza (South Mandurah) (223)	Daniel Wilson (Centrals)
2009	Waroona	Paul Pannell	South Mandurah	Waroona	Armadale	Rowan Arnott (South Mandurah); Paul White (South Mandurah)		Dustin Roberts (Waroona)	Rod Tregenza (South Mandurah) (132)	
2010	Waroona	Paul Pannell	Mandurah	Waroona	Halls Head	Rowan Arnott (Rockingham)		Ben Matthews-Herrald (Waroona)	Rod Tregenza (South Mandurah) (100)	
2011	Waroona	Paul Pannell	Rockingham	Waroona	Halls Head			Matthew Giumelli (Waroona)	Rod Tregenza (South Mandurah) (122)	
2012	Waroona	Craig Callaghan	Rockingham	Rockingham	Halls Head				Rod Tregenza (South Mandurah) (130)	
2013	Pinjarra	Matthew Templeton	Waroona	Pinjarra	Mandurah	Eddie Dann (Rockingham)		Brock O'brien	Rod Tregenza (South Mandurah) (112)	
2014	Pinjarra	Rob Smith	Centrals	Centrals	Mandurah	Tim Bruce (Halls Head); Tom Harper (Pinjarra)		Daniel Griffin (Pinjarra)	Alan Wilson (Waroona) 83	
2015	South Mandurah	Daniel Haines	Waroona	South Mandurah	Mandurah	Blair Bell (South Mandurah)		Brent Johnson (South Mandurah)	Marc Re (Halls Head) 58	
2016	Baldivis	Michael McCann	Waroona	Baldivis	Mandurah	Rocky Collins (Rockingham)		Robert Young (Baldivis)	Bradley Holmes (South Mandurah) 56	

== Ladders ==
2006

Peel	Wins	Byes	Losses	Draws	For	Against	%	Pts	Final	Team	G	B	Pts	Team	G	B	Pts
Rockingham	15	0	3	0	2060	1245	165.46%	60	Elimination	Waroona	12	12	84	Mandurah	6	10	46
Mundijong Centrals	14	0	3	1	1774	1153	153.86%	58	Qualifying	South Mandurah	14	8	92	Mundijong Centrals	6	12	48
South Mandurah	13	0	5	0	1973	1407	140.23%	52	1st semi	Waroona	13	13	91	Mundijong Centrals	8	9	57
Waroona	11	0	7	0	1464	1346	108.77%	44	2nd semi	South Mandurah	17	13	115	Rockingham	13	4	82
Mandurah	7	0	10	1	1641	1417	115.81%	30	Preliminary	Waroona	12	10	82	Rockingham	8	14	62
Baldivis	4	0	12	2	1264	1818	69.53%	20	Grand	South Mandurah	15	14	104	Waroona	9	7	61
Harvey	3	0	15	0	1014	2046	49.56%	12									
Pinjarra	3	0	15	0	1168	1926	60.64%	12									

2007

Peel	Wins	Byes	Losses	Draws	For	Against	%	Pts	Final	Team	G	B	Pts	Team	G	B	Pts
South Mandurah	14	0	3	1	1939	1097	176.75%	58	Elimination	Waroona	2	3	15	Harvey	0	2	2
Mundijong Centrals	14	0	3	1	1689	1053	160.40%	58	Qualifying	Mundijong Centrals	9	7	61	Mandurah	5	6	36
Mandurah	11	0	7	0	1499	1198	125.13%	44	1st semi	Waroona	10	6	66	Mandurah	7	7	49
Waroona	11	0	7	0	1446	1202	120.30%	44	2nd semi	Mundijong Centrals	19	5	119	South Mandurah	13	7	85
Harvey	8	0	10	0	1294	1477	87.61%	28	Preliminary	South Mandurah	13	9	87	Waroona	9	13	67
Baldivis	6	0	12	0	1073	1729	62.06%	24	Grand	Mundijong Centrals	13	7	85	South Mandurah	8	8	56
Rockingham	5	0	13	0	1149	1571	73.14%	20									
Pinjarra	2	0	16	0	972	1734	56.06%	8									

2008

Peel	Wins	Byes	Losses	Draws	For	Against	%	Pts	Final	Team	G	B	Pts	Team	G	B	Pts
South Mandurah	18	0	0	0	2988	859	347.85%	72	Elimination	Baldivis	15	11	101	Rockingham	11	9	75
Mundijong Centrals	15	0	3	0	1940	1424	136.24%	60	Qualifying	Mundijong Centrals	21	12	138	Waroona	14	6	90
Waroona	12	0	6	0	959	1204	79.65%	48	1st semi	Mundijong Centrals	15	9	99	Baldivis	7	9	51
Rockingham	8	0	10	0	1437	1795	80.06%	32	2nd semi	South Mandurah	19	11	125	Waroona	18	5	113
Baldivis	8	0	10	0	1467	1800	81.50%	32	Preliminary	Mundijong Centrals	10	6	66	Waroona	8	5	53
Pinjarra	7	0	11	0	1450	1817	79.80%	28	Grand	South Mandurah	26	16	172	Mundijong Centrals	5	5	35
Harvey	3	0	15	0	1157	1505	76.88%	12									
Mandurah	1	0	17	0	1143	2137	53.49%	4									

2009

Peel	Wins	Byes	Losses	Draws	For	Against	%	Pts	Final	Team	G	B	Pts	Team	G	B	Pts
Waroona	16	0	2	0	1689	1113	151.75%	64	Elimination	Baldivis	20	18	138	Pinjarra	8	8	56
South Mandurah	15	0	3	0	2089	1096	190.60%	60	Qualifying	South Mandurah	18	16	124	Mandurah	8	12	60
Mandurah	13	0	5	0	1770	1146	154.45%	52	1st semi	Baldivis	18	14	122	Mandurah	13	7	85
Baldiris	10	0	8	0	1855	1696	109.38%	40	2nd semi	Waroona	16	10	106	South Mandurah	9	9	63
Pinjarra	9	0	9	0	1592	1437	110.79%	36	Preliminary	South Mandurah	19	11	125	Baldivis	9	16	70
Mundijong Centrals	5	0	13	0	1289	1636	78.79%	20	Grand	Waroona	15	12	102	South Mandurah	12	11	83
Rockingham	4	0	14	0	1127	1933	58.30%	16									
Armadale	0	0	18	0	955	2309	41.36%	0									

2010

Peel	Wins	Byes	Losses	Draws	For	Against	%	Pts	Final	Team	G	B	Pts	Team	G	B	Pts
Waroona	18	0	0	0	1983	1036	191.41%	72	Elimination	Rockingham	18	9	117	South Mandurah	12	6	78
Mandurah	15	0	3	0	1816	1349	134.62%	60	Qualifying	Mandurah	13	13	91	Baldivis	11	12	78
Baldivis	9	0	9	0	1916	1558	122.98%	36	1st semi	Baldivis	18	3	111	Rockingham	11	14	80
Rockingham	9	0	9	0	1774	1501	118.19%	36	2nd semi	Waroona	10	10	70	Mandurah	5	4	34
South Mandurah	8	0	10	0	1478	1525	96.92%	32	Preliminary	Mandurah	18	13	121	Baldivis	11	6	72
Pinjarra	7	0	11	0	1518	1833	82.82%	28	Grand	Waroona	20	18	138	Mandurah	7	2	44
Mundijong Centrals	6	0	12	0	1551	1717	90.33%	24									
Halls Head	0	0	18	0	938	2455	38.21%	0									

2011

Peel	Wins	Byes	Losses	Draws	For	Against	%	Pts	Final	Team	G	B	Pts	Team	G	B	Pts
Waroona	17	0	1	0	2100	887	236.75%	68	Elimination	Mundijong Centrals	17	11	113	South Mandurah	13	10	88
Rockingham	15	0	3	0	2230	1158	192.57%	60	Qualifying	Rockingham	18	17	125	Pinjarra	8	14	62
Pinjarra	13	0	5	0	1772	1484	119.41%	52	1st semi	Pinjarra	16	11	107	Mundijong Centrals	13	9	87
Mundijong Centrals	9	0	9	0	1567	1790	87.54%	36	2nd semi	Waroona	11	14	80	Rockingham	12	6	78
South Mandurah	7	0	11	0	1722	1665	103.42%	28	Preliminary	Rockingham	13	17	95	Pinjarra	11	12	78
Mandurah	6	0	12	0	1566	1741	89.95%	24	Grand	Waroona	16	7	103	Rockingham	8	7	55
Baldivis	3	0	15	0	1207	2393	50.44%	12									
Halls Head	2	0	16	0	1055	2101	50.21%	8									

2012

Peel	Wins	Byes	Losses	Draws	For	Against	%	Pts	Final	Team	G	B	Pts	Team	G	B	Pts
Rockingham	17	0	1	0	2014	1101	182.92%	68	Elimination	Baldivis	12	6	78	Mundijong Centrals	18	12	120
Waroona	16	0	2	0	2120	946	224.10%	64	Qualifying	Waroona	20	13	133	South Mandurah	7	3	45
South Mandurah	10	0	8	0	1687	1707	98.83%	40	1st semi	South Mandurah	18	10	118	Mundijong Centrals	16	6	102
Baldivis	10	0	8	0	1617	1794	90.13%	40	2nd semi	Rockingham	13	12	90	Waroona	12	8	80
Mundijong Centrals	7	0	11	0	1592	1508	105.57%	28	Preliminary	Waroona	21	16	142	South Mandurah	6	8	44
Pinjarra	6	0	12	0	1169	1419	82.38%	24	Grand	Waroona	8	7	55	Rockingham	7	9	51
Mandurah	4	0	13	1	1258	1940	64.85%	18									
Halls Head	1	0	16	1	1060	2102	50.43%	6									

2013

Peel	Wins	Byes	Losses	Draws	For	Against	%	Pts	Final	Team	G	B	Pts	Team	G	B	Pts
Pinjarra	16	0	2	0	1975	1046	188.81%	64	Elimination	Mundijong Centrals	15	14	104	Baldivis	8	8	56
Waroona	15	0	3	0	1969	1028	191.54%	60	Qualifying	Waroona	15	19	109	Rockingham	9	8	62
Rockingham	15	0	3	0	1991	1073	185.55%	60	1st semi	Rockingham	20	14	134	Mundijong Centrals	17	7	109
Baldivis	8	0	10	0	1426	1527	93.39%	32	2nd semi	Pinjarra	16	12	108	Waroona	7	11	53
Mundijong Centrals	7	0	11	0	1620	1601	101.19%	28	Preliminary	Waroona	20	8	128	Rockingham	14	9	93
South Mandurah	7	0	11	0	1603	1709	93.80%	28	Grand	Pinjarra	15	14	104	Waroona	12	7	79
Halls Head	4	0	14	0	1324	1805	73.35%	16									
Mandurah	0	0	18	0	818	2937	27.85%	0									

2014

Peel	Wins	Byes	Losses	Draws	For	Against	%	Pts	Final	Team	G	B	Pts	Team	G	B	Pts
Mundijong Centrals	15	0	3	0	2158	1143	188.80%	60	Elimination	Halls Head	21	21	147	Baldivis	13	8	86
Waroona	15	0	3	0	2022	1098	184.15%	60	Qualifying	Pinjarra	12	12	84	Waroona	8	6	54
Pinjarra	12	0	6	0	1466	1206	121.56%	48	1st semi	Waroona	13	12	90	Halls Head	11	11	77
Halls Head	12	0	6	0	1606	1354	118.61%	48	2nd semi	Pinjarra	10	11	71	Mundijong Centrals	9	6	60
Baldivis	7	0	11	0	1617	1792	90.23%	28	Preliminary	Mundijong Centrals	15	16	106	Waroona	13	12	90
South Mandurah	6	0	12	0	1260	1647	76.50%	24	Grand	Pinjarra	14	7	91	Mundijong Centrals	12	13	85
Rockingham	3	0	15	0	1155	1941	59.51%	12									
Mandurah	2	0	16	0	1147	2250	50.98%	8									

2015

Peel	Wins	Byes	Losses	Draws	For	Against	%	Pts	Final	Team	G	B	Pts	Team	G	B	Pts
South Mandurah	16	0	2	0	2155	1263	170.63%	64	Elimination	Pinjarra	13	13	91	Baldivis	6	5	41
Halls Head	14	0	4	0	1781	1122	158.73%	56	Qualifying	Halls Head	13	10	88	Waroona	5	9	39
Waroona	13	0	5	0	1681	1229	136.78%	52	1st semi	Waroona	11	7	73	Pinjarra	10	5	65
Pinjarra	12	0	6	0	1647	1000	164.70%	48	2nd semi	South Mandurah	8	15	63	Halls Head	9	7	61
Baldivis	9	0	9	0	1520	1461	104.04%	36	Preliminary	Waroona	16	15	111	Halls Head	13	9	87
Rockingham	3	0	15	0	1030	1651	62.39%	12	Grand	South Mandurah	13	6	84	Waroona	10	5	65
Mundijong Centrals	3	0	15	0	1296	2212	58.59%	12									
Mandurah	2	0	16	0	987	2159	45.72%	8									

2016

Peel	Wins	Byes	Losses	Draws	For	Against	%	Pts	Final	Team	G	B	Pts	Team	G	B	Pts
Baldivis	15	0	3	0	1627	1208	134.69%	60	Elimination	Pinjarra	11	10	76	South Mandurah	6	7	43
Halls Head	13	0	5	0	1654	1249	132.43%	52	Qualifying	Halls Head	12	8	80	Waroona	13	11	89
Waroona	11	0	7	0	1492	1130	132.04%	44	1st semi	Halls Head	11	14	80	Pinjarra	11	11	77
Pinjarra	11	0	7	0	1355	1164	116.41%	44	2nd semi	Baldivis	14	10	94	Waroona	12	13	85
South Mandurah	10	0	8	0	1522	1289	118.08%	40	Preliminary	Waroona	14	8	92	Halls Head	14	5	89
Mundijong Centrals	7	0	11	0	1362	1603	84.97%	28	Grand	Baldivis	10	7	67	Waroona	9	8	62
Rockingham	5	0	13	0	1195	1470	81.29%	20									
Mandurah	0	0	18	0	1049	2143	48.95%	0									

2017

Peel	Wins	Byes	Losses	Draws	For	Against	%	Pts	Final	Team	G	B	Pts	Team	G	B	Pts
Pinjarra	14	0	4	0	1762	1017	173.25%	56	Elimination	Waroona	18	9	117	South Mandurah	14	15	99
Baldivis	13	0	5	0	1578	1178	133.96%	52	Qualifying	Baldivis	17	16	118	Mundijong Centrals	11	9	75
Mundijong Centrals	13	0	5	0	1627	1220	133.36%	52	1st semi	Waroona	23	12	150	Mundijong Centrals	11	10	76
South Mandurah	12	0	6	0	1779	1227	144.99%	48	2nd semi	Pinjarra	12	13	85	Baldivis	8	6	54
Waroona	9	0	9	0	1455	1240	117.34%	36	Preliminary	Waroona	11	14	80	Baldivis	9	7	61
Rockingham	7	0	11	0	1427	1736	82.20%	28	Grand	Pinjarra	14	12	96	Waroona	8	7	55
Halls Head	2	0	16	0	918	1768	51.92%	8									
Mandurah	2	0	16	0	1028	2188	46.98%	8									

2018

Pinjarra	Wins	Byes	Losses	Draws	For	Against	%	Pts	Final	Team	G	B	Pts	Team	G	B	Pts
Pinjarra	14	0	3	1	1657	966	171.53%	58	Elimination	Rockingham	18	11	119	South Mandurah	17	10	112
Baldivis	13	0	5	0	1580	1167	135.39%	52	Qualifying	Mundijong Centrals	14	16	100	Baldivis	4	12	36
Mundijong Centrals	12	0	6	0	1976	1214	162.77%	48	1st semi	Rockingham	17	11	113	Baldivis	17	8	110
Rockingham	11	0	7	0	1779	1169	152.18%	44	2nd semi	Mundijong Centrals	13	11	89	Pinjarra	10	13	73
South Mandurah	10	0	8	0	1513	1215	124.53%	40	Preliminary	Pinjarra	10	7	67	Rockingham	7	11	53
Halls Head	7	0	10	1	1189	1476	80.56%	30	Grand	Pinjarra	13	7	85	Mundijong Centrals	5	12	42
Mandurah	2	0	16	0	1077	2260	47.65%	8									
Waroona	2	0	16	0	983	2287	42.98%	8									

2019

0	Wins	Byes	Losses	Draws	For	Against	%	Pts	Final	Team	G	B	Pts	Team	G	B	Pts
Rockingham	15	0	3	0	1962	895	219.22%	60	Elimination	Mandurah	8	11	59	Mundijong Centrals	5	7	37
Baldivis	14	0	4	0	1676	1040	161.15%	56	Qualifying	Baldivis	9	5	59	Pinjarra	9	4	58
Pinjarra	14	0	4	0	1347	976	138.01%	56	1st semi	Mandurah	9	15	69	Pinjarra	9	11	65
Mandurah	9	0	9	0	1537	1415	108.62%	36	2nd semi	Rockingham	10	12	72	Baldivis	6	7	43
Mundijong Centrals	9	0	9	0	1217	1219	99.84%	36	Preliminary	Baldivis	12	9	81	Mandurah	10	13	73
Halls Head	4	0	14	0	1156	1871	61.79%	16	Grand	Baldivis	11	10	76	Rockingham	5	7	37
Waroona	4	0	14	0	976	1759	55.49%	16									
South Mandurah	3	0	15	0	978	1674	58.42%	12									

== AFL players who originally come from PFL clubs ==
- Paul Bower (South Mandurah) – Carlton
- Daniel Haines (South Mandurah) – Fremantle
- Matt Riggio (Waroona) – North Melbourne
- Daniel Wells (Kwinana) – North Melbourne
- Hayden Ballantyne (Baldivis) – Fremantle
- Farren Ray (Mandurah) – Western Bulldogs/ St Kilda
- Brock O'Brien (Pinjarra) – Fremantle
- Nathan Wilson (Mandurah) – GWS Giants
- Brad Walsh (Rockingham) – Carlton
- Harley Bennell (Pinjarra) – Gold Coast/ Fremantle
- Ben Newton (Baldivis) – Port Adelaide/Melbourne
- Josh Schoenfeld (Rockingham) – Gold Coast
- Bradley Lynch (Mandurah) – Western Bulldogs
- Scott Gumbleton (Halls Head) - Essendon
- Blayne Wilson (Halls Head) - West Coast
- Reece Torrent (Halls Head) - Brisbane
- Bo Allan (Halls Head) - West Coast
