= Hills Football Association =

Australian rules football leagues, Western Australia

- Sport: Australian rules football
- Founded: 1946; 80 years ago
- President: Brian Pallister
- No. of teams: 6
- Region: Shire of Mundaring, City of Swan & City of Kalamunda
- Most recent champion: Chidlow (9) (2026)
- Most titles: Swan Valley (18)

The Hills Football Association is an Australian rules football leagues based in Western Australia. The association was formed in 1946. The inaugural clubs were Chidlow, Mundaring, Parkerville, Sawyers Valley and Mt Helena. All clubs were within the Shire of Mundaring.

During the 1970s, 1980s and 1990s thirty-two clubs joined and left the Hills Football Association. During the late 1990s there were two divisions, with six clubs in the first division and eight in the second. Second division last competed in 2001.

== Clubs ==
=== Locations ===
Locations of the Hills FA clubs.

=== Current ===
Club	Colours	Logo	Home ground	Former League	Est.	Years in competition	Premierships	
Club	Colours	Logo	Home ground	Former League	Est.	Years in competition	Total	Years
Chidlow		Cougars	Chidlow Recreation Ground, Chidlow		1946	1946–1950, 1990–1995, 1997-	9	1946, 1948, 1998 (Div 2), 2014, 2017, 2018, 2021, 2022, 2026
Gidgegannup		Bulldogs	Percy Cullen Oval, Gidgegannup		1979	1979–	12	1984, 2000 (Div 2), 2003, 2006, 2007, 2009, 2010, 2011, 2012, 2013, 2015, 2016
Midland		Tigers	North Swan Park, Middle Swan	SFL	1897	1997–2001, 2026-	0	
Mt Helena		Lions	Elsie Austin Oval, Mount Helena	–	1948	1949–1950, 1953–1963, 1965–1968, 1980–1982, 1984-1989, 1993-	3	1982, 1999 (Div 2), 2020
Mundaring		Roos	Mundaring Recreation Ground, Mundaring	PFL		1946–1964, 1967–1968, 1972, 1979–1986, 1995–	11	1947, 1949, 1956, 1959, 1980, 1981, 1983, 1986, 2002, 2008, 2019
Pickering Brook		Hawks	George Spriggs Reserve, Pickering Brook			1973–1974, 1979–1982, 1988-1989, 1993–1997, 2000–2001, 2010–	1	2023

=== Former ===
Club	Colours	Logo	Home ground	Former League	Est.	Years in competition	Premierships		Fate
Club	Colours	Logo	Home ground	Former League	Est.	Years in competition	Total	Years	Fate
Army						1990	0	-	Folded
Bartons Mill						1970–1973	0	-	Folded
Bellevue Rovers			Goodchild Oval, Bellevue			1951–1965, 1984–1990, 1992-1996	5	1954, 1955, 1958, 1961, 1963	Folded after 1996 season
Belmont [1]			Higgins Park, East Victoria Park	SNFL		1971	0	-	Moved to WAFA in 1972
Belmont [2]		Bombers	Peet Park, Kewdale			1991	0	-	Moved to Peel FL in 1992
Bullsbrook		Saints	Pickett Park, Bullsbrook	–	1993	1993–2024	1	2001 (Div 2)	In recess since 2024 season
Burswood Swans		Eagles				1994–1997	1	1996	Folded
Ellenbrook		Eels	Coolamon Park, Ellenbrook	MFL	2002	2003–2005	0	-	Moved to WAFA in 2006
Forrestfield		Rhinos	John Reid Oval, Forrestfield	–	2013	2013–2014	0	-	Moved to WAAFL in 2015
Gingin		Eagles	Gingin Oval, Gingin	SMFA	1908	1969–1972	0	-	Moved to Mortlock FL in 1974
Kalamunda [1]		Tigers	Kostera Oval, Kalamunda	–	1954	1948–1953	1	1951	Moved to Sunday National FL in 1954
Kalamunda [2]		Cougars	Kostera Oval, Kalamunda	–	1965	1965–1968	1	1967	Had two sides (blue and White) in 1967 as well as in 1968 (1 and 2). Moved to the South Suburban-Murray NFL in 1969
Kingsley Seconds		Cats	Kingsley Memorial Reserve, Kingsley	–	1994	1997	0	-	Moved to WAAFL in 1998
Midland Rovers			Midland Oval, Midland			1983–1986	1	1985	Folded after 1986 season
Midvale		Lions	Morrison Oval, Forrestfield		2001	2001–2002	0	-	Moved to Mercantile FA in 2003
Morley seconds		Bulldogs	RA Cook Reserve, Bedford	WAAFL	1969	1976	0	-	Left league
Mundaring-Mt Helena			Mundaring Recreation Ground, Mundaring	–	1969	1969–1971	0	-	De-merged into Mundaring and Mt Helena in 1972
Parkerville	(1946-85)(2014-18)	Bushrangers	Parkerville Oval, Parkerville			1946–1978, 1982–1985, 2014–2018	2	1962, 1964	Folded after 2018 season
Sawyers Valley [1]			Sawyers Valley Oval, Sawyers Valley		1946	1946-1950	0		Merged with Chidlow to form Sawyers Valley-Chidlow in 1951
Sawyers Valley [2] (Sawyers Valley-Chidlow 1951-86)		Saints	Sawyers Valley Oval, Sawyers Valley	WAAFL	1951	1951–1967, 1969–1986, 1993–1994	3	1957, 1966, 1979	Recess in 1967. Moved to WAAFL in 1987. Folded after 1994 season
Stirling Districts		Maulers	Wordsworth Reserve, Inglewood	WAAFL	1982	1984–1985	0	-	Folded after 1984 season
Swan Athletic (Herne Hill 1950-53)		Swans	Swan Athletic Oval, Herne Hill	SMFA	1930	1950-1953, 1969-1978	11	1950, 1952, 1953, 1969, 1970, 1973, 1974, 1975, 1976, 1977, 1978	Moved to Sunday National FL in 1954. Moved to WAAFL in 1979
Swan Valley (Midland YCW 1965-70)		Valley	Swan Valley Oval, Herne Hill	WAFA, SFL	1965	1965–1972, 1985–2001, 2004–2005	18	1965, 1968, 1971, 1972, 1987, 1988, 1989, 1991, 1992, 1993, 1994, 1995, 1997, 1999, 2000, 2001, 2004, 2005	Two sides in 1965–1966. Moved to WAAFL in 1979. Moved to Sunday FL in 2002. Returned to WAAFL in 2006.
Swan View		Swans	Brown Park, Swan View	PFL	1962	1983–1985, 1996–2001, 2019-2021, 2023–2025	3	1998, 2024, 2025	Returned to Perth FL in 2026.
Toodyay			Toodyay Oval, Toodyay	AVFA	1888	1949–1951	0	-	Moved to Victoria Plains FA in 1952
Warwick-Greenwood		Bulls	Percy Doyle Reserve, Duncraig	SFL	2003	2021–2023	0	-	Returned to Sunday FL in 2024
Wooroloo [1]			Bailup Park, Wooroloo			1971–1978	0	-	Folded
Wooroloo [2]		Bombers	Woorloo Prison Farm, Wooroloo	–	2006	2006–2007	0	-	Entered recess in 2008, re-formed in Mercantile FA in 2009
Wundowie (Wundowie-Baker's Hill 1948-49)		Warriors	Wundowie Oval, Wundowie			1948-1949, 1951-2001, 2003-2004, 2011-2014	3	1960, 1990, 1997 (Div 2)	Folded after 2014 season

== Grand final results ==
Division 1

Year	Premiers	Score	Runners up	Score
1946	Chidlow	12.8 (80)	Sawyers Valley	6.7 (43)
1947	Mundaring	20.14 (134)	Chidlow	12.19 (91)
1948	Chidlow	12.17 (89)	Parkerville	7.8 (50)
1949	Mundaring	13.13 (91)	Kalamunda	12.17 (89)
1950	Herne Hill	11.24 (90)	Kalamunda	5.14 (44)
1951	Kalamunda	+2 pts	Herne Hill	
1952	Herne Hill	8.18 (66)	Sawyers Valley-Chidlow	6.13 (49)
1953	Herne Hill		Bellevue Rovers	
1954	Bellevue Rovers	+22 pts	Sawyers Valley-Chidlow	
1955	Bellevue Rovers		Mundaring	
1956	Mundaring	12.11 (83)	Sawyers Valley-Chidlow	8.14 (62)
1957	Sawyers Valley-Chidlow	15.13 (103)	Mt Helena	10.10 (70)
1958	Bellevue Rovers	+17 pts	Mundaring	
1959	Mundaring	16.12 (108)	Bellevue Rovers	14.23 (107)
1960	Wundowie	15.20 (110)	Bellevue Rovers	10.11 (71)
1961	Bellevue Rovers	13.19 (97)	Wundowie	10.11 (71)
1962	Parkerville	19.20 (134)	Mundaring	13.10 (88)
1963	Bellevue Rovers		Wundowie	
1964	Parkerville	16.9 (105)	Wundowie	11.9 (75)
1965	Midland YCW (1)	14.17 (101)	Parkerville	13.10 (88)
1966	Sawyers Valley-Chidlow	21.25 (151)	Kalamunda	11.2 (68)
1967	Kalamunda Blue	18.16 (124)	Midland YCW	14.12 (96)
1968	Midland YCW	17.14 (116)	Kalamunda	13.12 (90)
1969	Swan Athletic	15.6 (96)	Midland YCW	10.9 (69)
1970	Swan Athletic		Gingin	
1971	Swan Valley	10.21 (81)	Belmont	8.8 (56)
1972	Swan Valley		Wooroloo	
1973	Swan Athletic	19.25 (139)	Parkerville	5.13 (43)
1974	Swan Athletic		Sawyers Valley-Chidlow	
1975	Swan Athletic		Parkerville	
1976	Swan Athletic	18.15 (123)	Wundowie	9.6 (60)
1977	Swan Athletic	19.13 (127)	Wundowie	10.14 (74)
1978	Swan Athletic	7.13 (55)	Sawyers Valley-Chidlow	4.11 (35)
1979	Sawyers Valley-Chidlow	14.19 (103)	Gidgegannup	13.13 (91)
1980	Mundaring	12.15 (87)	Sawyers Valley-Chidlow	7.11 (53)
1981	Mundaring	20.17 (137)	Gidgegannup	16.11 (107)
1982	Mt Helena	17.9 (111)	Mundaring	13.17 (95)
1983	Mundaring	20.20 (140)	Sawyers Valley-Chidlow	14.20 (104)
1984	Gidgegannup	17.14 (116)	Mundaring	17.13 (115)
1985	Midland Rovers	22.24 (156)	Sawyers Valley-Chidlow	10.7 (67)
1986	Mundaring	25.24 (174)	Sawyers Valley-Chidlow	8.12 (60)
1987	Swan Valley	12.10 (82)	Wundowie	6.13 (49)
1988	Swan Valley	17.13 (115)	Wundowie	8.18 (66)
1989	Swan Valley		Bellevue Rovers	
1990	Wundowie		Bellevue Rovers	
1991	Swan Valley	12.13 (85)	Belmont	4.8 (32)
1992	Swan Valley	16.12 (108)	Bellevue Rovers	9.15 (69)
1993	Swan Valley	14.9 (93)	Sawyers Valley	11.10 (76)
1994	Swan Valley	17.15 (117)	Pickering Brook	11.6 (72)
1995	Swan Valley	9.14 (68)	Burswood Swans	8.17 (65)
1996	Burswood Swans	7.7 (49)	Swan Valley	4.10 (34)
1997	Swan Valley	11.7 (73)	Swan View	5.11 (41)
1998	Swan View	12.9 (81)	Swan Valley	9.14 (68)
1999	Swan Valley	16.6 (102)	Swan View	11.7 (73)
2000	Swan Valley	25.14 (164)	Pickering Brook	7.1 (43)
2001	Swan Valley	11.19 (85)	Gidgegannup	6.7 (43)
2002	Mundaring	5.8 (38)	Gidgegannup	4.11 (35)
2003	Gidgegannup	7.8 (50)	Mundaring	2.1 (13)
2004	Swan Valley	7.11 (53)	Ellenbrook	8.5 (53)
Replay	Swan Valley	11.16 (82)	Ellenbrook	9.2 (56)
2005	Swan Valley	13.11 (89)	Mundaring	9.4 (58)
2006	Gidgegannup	18.7 (115)	Bullsbrook	3.6 (24)
2007	Gidgegannup	9.16 (70)	Wooroloo	6.11 (47)
2008	Mundaring	10.9 (69)	Gidgegannup	5.8 (38)
2009	Gidgegannup	16.13 (109)	Mundaring	7.7 (49)
2010	Gidgegannup	10.13 (73)	Mundaring	6.9 (45)
2011	Gidgegannup	10.9 (69)	Pickering Brook	8.7 (55)
2012	Gidgegannup	15.16 (106)	Pickering Brook	14.4 (88)
2013	Gidgegannup	11.13 (79)	Chidlow	9.11 (65)
2014	Chidlow	12.9 (81)	Gidgegannup	11.11 (77)
2015	Gidgegannup	19.11 (125)	Chidlow	7.9 (51)
2016	Gidgegannup	16.9 (105)	Chidlow	9.4 (58)
2017	Chidlow	14.10 (94)	Mundaring	8.8 (56)
2018	Chidlow	10.9 (69)	Pickering Brook	5.2 (32)
2019	Mundaring	9.11 (65)	Chidlow	8.4 (52)
2020	Mt Helena	13.8 (86)	Pickering Brook	12.8 (80)
2021	Chidlow	16.13 (109)	Pickering Brook	9.7 (61)
2022	Chidlow	15.13 (103)	Pickering Brook	8.10 (58)
2023	Pickering Brook	13.14 (92)	Chidlow	9.8 (62)
2024	Swan View	17.10 (112)	Pickering Brook	9.6 (60)
2025	Swan View	10.13 (73)	Chidlow	8.12 (60)
2026	Chidlow	21.15 (141)	Mundaring	4.4 (28)

Division 2

Year	Premiers	Score	Runners up	Score
1997	Wundowie	15.10 (100)	Chidlow	7.10 (52)
1998	Chidlow	10.14 (74)	Gidgegannup	7.9 (51)
1999	Mt Helena	15.9 (99)	Gidgegannup	12.15 (87)
2000	Gidgegannup	14.9 (93)	Bullsbrook	11.7 (73)
2001	Bullsbrook	11.11 (77)	Mundaring	12.4 (76)

== Awards ==
Year	Ben Seabrook Medal (Best & Fairest)		President's Medal (Runner-up B&F)		Leading Goalscorer		Betty Wilkins 21 & Under Award	Grand Final Best on Ground
Year	Player (Club)	Votes	Player (Club)	Votes	Player (Club)	Goals	Betty Wilkins 21 & Under Award	Grand Final Best on Ground
Single Division Competition (1946-1996)
1946	Colin Farley (Chidlow)		D. Best (Mt Helena)					
1947	M. Hilton (Mundaring)	17	J. Fardig (Parkerville)	15				
1948	M. Millar (Kalamunda)	16	N. Herald (Wundowie-Baker's Hill)	15				
1949	M. Millar (Kalamunda)	22	C. Baker (Mundaring) G. Anderson (Mt Helena)	19				
1950	M. O'Loughlin (Kalamunda)	24	D. Campbell (Parkerville)	20				
1951	S. Robinson (Toodyay)	24	N. Norrish (Mundaring)	19				
1952	D. Bailey (Sawyers Valley-Chidlow)		Jim Box (Wundowie)					
1953	K. Harper (Mt Helena)	34	Jim Box (Wundowie)	16	D. Thomas			
1954	D. Sardelich (Wundowie)	18	Jim Box (Wundowie)	17	D. Edwards	58		
1955	H. Angel (Mt Helena)	22	Jim Box (Wundowie)	20	G. Smith			
1956	J. Jackson (Sawyers Valley-Chidlow)	21	T. Prendergast (Mundaring)	17	M. Lee (Bellevue)	56		
1957	L. Wood (Mt Helena)	26	Jim Box (Wundowie)					
1958	L. Wallis (Mt Helena)	15	L. Lavtas (Parkerville)	13				
1959	B. Watters (Sawyers Valley-Chidlow)							
1960	Benjamin Seabrook (Wundowie)	25	E. Ingram (Parkerville)	18	R. Taylor (Bellevue)	100		
1961	Benjamin Seabrook (Wundowie)	24	G. Giles (Sawyers Valley-Chidlow)	16				
1962	Benjamin Seabrook (Wundowie)				Benjamin Seabrook (Wundowie)			
1963	A. Dunning (Sawyers Valley-Chidlow)	16	Benjamin Seabrook (Wundowie)	14	Benjamin Seabrook (Wundowie)			
1964	Benjamin Seabrook (Wundowie)	21	B. Buttsworth (Sawyers Valley-Chidlow)	16				
1965	Benjamin Seabrook (Wundowie)	25	N. Moran	24	Benjamin Seabrook (Wundowie)	98		
1966	Benjamin Seabrook (Wundowie)	24	A. Dunning (Sawyers Valley-Chidlow)	17	Benjamin Seabrook (Wundowie)	63		
1967	Benjamin Seabrook (Wundowie)	39	G. Watters (Parkerville)	24	J. Barter (Midland YCW)	73		
1968	R. Willison (Sawyers Valley-Chidlow)	24	Benjamin Seabrook (Wundowie)	23	J. Barter (Midland YCW)	100		
1969	Benjamin Seabrook (Wundowie)	24	R. Andrich (Midland YCW)	16	Benjamin Seabrook (Wundowie)	78		
1970	B. Rakick (Swan Athletic)	37	W. Robbins	21	R. Hrabar (Swan Athletic)	118		
1971	J. Wenn (Belmont)	24	R. Glover (Gingin)	23				
1972	R. Foster (Parkerville)	19	B. Seabrook (Wundowie)		P. O'Farrell (Swan Athletic)	135		
1973	P. Hodgson (Swan Athletic) Benjamin Seabrook (Wundowie)	33			R. Hrabar (Swan Athletic)	103		
1974	G. Foster (Parkerville)		R. Page (Swan Athletic		C. Ashman (Swan Athletic)	83		
1975	T. Haines (Wundowie)				T. Haines (Wundowie)	73		
1976	D. Winmar (Wooroloo)		P. Branch (Wundowie)		D. Pavlinovich (Swan Athletic)			
1977	T. Haines (Wundowie)				T. Haines (Wundowie)			
1978	B. Bozich (Swan Athletic)	14	B. Wheeler (Wooroloo)	12				
1979	B. Liddiard (Gidgegannup)	23	M. Trew (Mundaring) G. Budge (Wundowie)	16	A. Mathews (Sawyers Valley-Chidlow)	73		
1980	J. Gardner (Mundaring)	21	G. Clancy (Wundowie)	18	M. Trew (Mundaring)	46		
1981	N. Payne (Pickering Brook)	21	N. Wilkerson (Mt Helena)	16	C. Beck (Mt Helena)	49		
1982	P. Farmer (Mt Helena) Mick Denboer (Mundaring)	17	M. Trew (Mundaring)	16	G. Payne (Mt Helena)	76		
1983	G. Bradley (Parkerville)	16	J. Lauren (Mundaring)	15	B. McCrum (Mundaring)			
1984	A. Bropho (Midland Rovers)		Noel Baker (Sawyers Valley-Chidlow) N. Denboer (Mundaring)		G. Kent (Sawyers Valley-Chidlow)			
1985	C. Robb (Stirling)	20	A. Bropho (Midland Rovers) N. Denboer (Mundaring)		S. Littlefair (Mundaring)	91		
1986	Peter Whife (Gidgegannup)		W. McShane (Sawyers Valley-Chidlow)		Steven Bogar	124		
1987	Mark Davis (Wundowie)		Roy Hill (Wundowie)		K. Davis (Wundowie)	113		
1988	P. Bruce (Bellevue)		Bill McKinlay (Gidgegannup)		J. Candeloro (Wundowie)	64		
1989	Steven Stack (Wundowie) Mark Boyd (Bellevue)		A. Kirwan (Mt Helena)		David Della Franca (Pickering Brook)	52		
1990	Roy Hill (Wundowie)		S. Fox (Army)		Rick Lynch (Bellevue)	50		
1991	Ian Williams (Swan Valley)		Neil Sumich (Swan Valley)		Kevin Shorter (Gidgegannup)			
1992	Bill McKinlay (Chidlow)		John Whife (Gidgegannup)		Kevin Shorter (Gidgegannup)			
1993	Tharran Kickett (Bellevue)		Alan Marsden (Pickering Brook)		David Della Franca (Pickering Brook)	107		
1994	Wayne Gilmour (Gidgegannup)		Craig Watson (Bullsbrook)		Robert Chatley (Burswood)	107		
1995	Craig Watson (Swan Valley)		Ian Williams (Swan Valley)		Robert Chatley (Burswood)	100		
1996	Rick Ellard (Swan Valley)		Justin Stephenson (Swan Valley)		Robert Chatley (Burswood)	100		
Two Division Competition 1997-2001
Division 1
1997	Fred Haynes (Swan View) Ray Keene (Midland)		Richard Della Franca (Pickering Brook)		Shane Bertolini (Burswood)	56		
1998	Rick Ellard (Swan Valley)		Fred Haynes (Swan View)		Simon Hrabar (Swan View)	97		
1999	Rick Ellard (Swan Valley)		Clifton Murray (Midland)		Todd Hawes (Swan View)	73		
2000	Richard Della Franca (Pickering Brook)		Leon Wilson (Chidlow)		Glen Coyle (Swan Valley)	92		
2001	Paul Hanson (Swan Valley)	20	Simon Dober (Pickering Brook)	17	Glen Coyle (Swan Valley)	36		
Division 2
1997	Bill McKinlay (Chidlow)				Darryl Narkle (Midland)	80		
1998	Gareth Elliot (Chidlow)		Adam McKenzie (Gidgegannup)					
1999	Craig Sanders (Gidgegannup)				Wayne Sowden (Mt Helena)	54	Craig Sanders (Gidgegannup)	
2000	Luke Murray (Bullsbrook)				Michael Potts (Bullsbrook)	49		
2001	Brad Wilcocks (Midvale)	29			Dave Wilcock (Mundaring)	100		
Single Division Competition (2002-present)
2002	Brett Cassidy (Gidgegannup)	34	Alistair Kerr (Mundaring)	27	John McCole (Mt Helena)	71	Gareth Donald (Chidlow)	
2003	Brett Cassidy (Gidgegannup) Shane Henderson (Ellenbrook)	18	Ross Carr (Gidgegannup) Craig Duff (Chidlow) Steven Buckle (Mt Helena)	18	Chris Thomas (Mundaring)	65		
2004	David Park (Swan Valley)	21	Paul Della Bona (Mundaring) Matthew Rutherford (Ellenbrook)	17	John McCole (Mt Helena)	71	Shane Hobcraft (Mt Helena)	
2005	Andrew Thomas (Mundaring)	18	David Park (Swan Valley) Matthew Rutherford (Ellenbrook)	17	Scott Tie (Swan Valley)	48	Nick Nuttall (Mundaring)	
2006	Brett Cassidy (Gidgegannup) Russell Cockman (Mt Helena)	17	Allan Parriam (Bullsbrook)	16	Jason Woodley (Wooroloo)	85	Gavin Jacks (Bullsbrook)	
2007	Raymond Hindmarsh (Wooroloo)	22	Daniel Debattista (Bullsbrook)	16	Kerrin Burnett (Gidgegannup)	82	Gavin Scott (Mundaring)	Brett Cassidy (Gidgegannup)
2008	Joe Cowton (Mundaring)	38	Shane Fitzgerald (Chidlow)	18	Chris Thomas (Mundaring)	70	Shane Fitzgerald (Chidlow)	
2009	Gavin Scott (Gidgegannup)	22	James Hartley (Mundaring)	15	Brett Cassidy (Gidgegannup)	56	Stuart Smith (Chidlow)	Sandy Bent (Gidgegannup)
2010	Joe Cowton (Mundaring)	26	Shane Fitzgerald (Chidlow)	19	Wayne Sowden (Mt Helena)	57	Chris Scott (Gidgegannup)	
2011	Adam McKinlay (Chidlow)	27	Steve Caccetta (Pickering Brook)	21	Adam McKinlay (Chidlow)	100	Steve Caccetta (Pickering Brook)	Ben Jarvis (Pickering Brook)
2012	Gavin Scott (Gidgegannup)	23	Matthew Mallaby (Chidlow)	15	Anthony Faranda (Pickering Brook)	85	Ryan Gray (Gidgegannup)	Ryan Gray (Gidgegannup)
2013	Adam McKinlay (Chidlow)	30	Jake Davis (Mundaring)	19	Adam McKinlay (Chidlow)	151	Jake Davis (Mundaring)	Stephen Kelderman (Gidgegannup)
2014	Tom Cowton (Mundaring) Michael McKinlay (Chidlow)	20	Shayne Long (Forrestfield) Chris Scott (Gidgegannup)	15	Shayne Long (Forrestfield)	103	Jayke Soltwisch (Parkerville)	Clinton Farrell (Chidlow)
2015	Michael McKinlay (Chidlow)	22	Tom Cowton (Mundaring)	19	Tim Tanner (Gidgegannup)	73	Luke Tanner (Gidgegannup)	Tim Tanner (Gidgegannup)
2016	Rod Manton (Gidgegannup)	22	Michael McKinlay (Chidlow)	20	Tim Tanner (Gidgegannup) Chris Scott (Gidgegannup)	63	Jack Holley (Mt Helena) Mackenzie Heaven (Gidgegannup)	Mackenzie Heaven (Gidgegannup)
2017	Riley Thompson (Pickering Brook) Jack Holley (Mt Helena)	17	Clint Farrell (Chidlow)	14	Brett McKinlay (Chidlow)	69	Michael Italiano (Mundaring)	Reece Forbes (Chidlow)
2018	Jake Davis (Mundaring) Michael McKinlay (Chidlow)	27	Riley Thompson (Pickering Brook)	17	Ben Horsman (Pickering Brook)	64	Elijah Michon (Chidlow)	Reece Forbes (Chidlow)
2019	Michael Burges (Swan View)	19	Jack Holley (Mt Helena) Jordan Kimberley (Mt Helena)	17	Jack Holley (Mt Helena)	58	Jordan Kimberley (Mt Helena)	Jake Davis (Mundaring)
2020	Luke Tanner (Gidgegannup)	22	Michael Davies (Bullsbrook) Jake Davies (Mundaring)	15	Leigh McCallum (Bullsbrook)	38	Tom Craig (Bullsbrook)	
2021	Bradley Jetta (Pickering Brook)	30	Steven Schorer (Chidlow)	27	Austin Thomas (Mundaring)	60	James Thompson (Bullsbrook)	Adam McKinlay (Chidlow)
2022	Sam Thompson (Bullsbrook)	22	Bradley Jetta (Pickering Brook) Matthew Mallaby (Chidlow)	17	Austin Thomas (Mundaring)	76	Sam Thompson (Bullsbrook)	Adam McKinlay (Chidlow)
2023	Josh Hollingum (Swan View)	33	Steven Cacccetta (Pickering Brook)	32	John Armstrong (Pickering Brook)	101	Liam Marriott (Gidgegannup)	Bradley Jetta (Pickering Brook)
2024	Josh Hollingum (Swan View)	33	Bradley Jetta (Pickering Brook)	21	Austin Thomas (Mundaring)	73	Sam Butler (Mundaring)	Josh Hollingum (Swan View)
2025	Josh Hollingum (Swan View) Jake Forman (Chidlow)		Robert Di Salvio (Mundaring) Adam McKinlay (Chidlow) Steven Schorer (Chidlow)		Jeff Ladd (Swan View)	74	Liam Marriott (Gidgegannup)	Caleb Butler (Swan View)
2026	Jake Forman (Chidlow)		Sam Butler (Mundaring) Sateki A'Vard (Mundaring)		Jess Cartwright (Mt Helena)	80	Bo Read (Mt Helena)	Adam McKinlay (Chidlow)

== Ladders and Finals ==
=== 2002 ===
Final	Team	G	B	Pts	Team	G	B	Pts
Elimination	Midvale	16	8	104	Mt Helena	10	9	69
Qualifying	Mundaring	16	6	102	Chidlow	5	5	35
1st Semi	Chidlow	5	9	39	Midvale	2	3	15
2nd Semi	Gidgegannup	5	8	38	Mundaring	5	4	34
Preliminary	Mundaring	13	11	89	Chidlow	7	4	46
Grand	Mundaring	5	8	38	Gidgegannup	4	11	35

=== 2003 ===
Final	Team	G	B	Pts	Team	G	B	Pts
Elimination	Ellenbrook	16	9	105	Mt Helena	12	9	81
Qualifying	Chidlow	11	5	71	Gidgegannup	9	9	63
1st Semi	Mundaring	17	10	112	Ellenbrook	13	5	83
2nd Semi	Gidgegannup	14	13	97	Chidlow	4	5	29
Preliminary	Mundaring	12	11	83	Chidlow	6	5	41
Grand	Gidgegannup	7	8	50	Mundaring	2	1	13

=== 2004 ===
Final	Team	G	B	Pts	Team	G	B	Pts
Elimination	Mundaring	14	11	95	Mt Helena	5	9	39
Qualifying	Gidgegannup	11	9	75	Swan Valley	7	7	49
1st Semi	Swan Valley	17	20	122	Mundaring	2	5	17
2nd Semi	Ellenbrook	12	7	79	Gidgegannup	9	8	62
Preliminary	Swan Valley	12	17	89	Gidgegannup	8	6	54
Grand	Ellenbrook	8	5	53	Swan Valley	7	11	53
Grand Replay	Swan Valley	11	16	82	Ellenbrook	9	2	56

=== 2005 ===
Final	Team	G	B	Pts	Team	G	B	Pts
Elimination	Mt Helena	11	7	73	Ellenbrook			72
Qualifying	Swan Valley	14	11	95	Gidgegannup	7	6	48
1st Semi	Gidgegannup	12	20	92	Mt Helena	9	2	56
2nd Semi	Swan Valley	11	6	72	Mundaring	8	5	53
Preliminary	Mundaring	11	9	75	Gidgegannup	11	7	73
Grand	Swan Valley	13	11	89	Mundaring	9	4	58

=== 2006 ===
Final	Team	G	B	Pts	Team	G	B	Pts
1st semi	Wooroloo	19	11	125	Mt Helena	6	9	45
2nd semi	Gidgegannup	15	11	101	Bullsbrook	6	9	45
Preliminary	Bullsbrook	12	8	80	Wooroloo	7	5	47
Grand	Gidgegannup	18	7	115	Bullsbrook	3	6	24

=== 2007 ===
Final	Team	G	B	Pts	Team	G	B	Pts
1st semi	Mundaring	12	7	79	Bullsbrook	10	13	73
2nd semi	Wooroloo	15	14	104	Gidgegannup	6	9	45
Preliminary	Gidgegannup	19	7	121	Mundaring	6	5	41
Grand	Gidgegannup	9	16	70	Wooroloo	6	11	47

=== 2008 ===
Hills	Wins	Losses	Draws	For	Against	%	Pts	Final	Team	G	B	Pts	Team	G	B	Pts
Mundaring	16	0	0	1898	791	239.95%	64	1st semi	Bullsbrook	12	4	76	Mount Helena	10	9	69
Gidgegannup	10	6	0	1488	918	162.09%	40	2nd semi	Mundaring	17	16	118	Gidgegannup	5	5	35
Bullsbrook	7	9	0	1318	1232	106.98%	28	Preliminary	Gidgegannup	13	13	91	Bullsbrook	9	7	61
Mount Helena	4	12	0	1291	1904	67.45%	16	Grand	Mundaring	10	9	69	Gidgegannup	5	8	38
Chidlow	3	13	0	751	1891	39.71%	12									

=== 2009 ===
Hills	Wins	Losses	Draws	For	Against	%	Pts	Final	Team	G	B	Pts	Team	G	B	Pts
Gidgegannup	16	0	0	2249	471	477.49%	64	1st semi	Bullsbrook	16	8	104	Chidlow	13	6	84
Mundaring	12	4	0	1575	919	171.38%	48	2nd semi	Gidgegannup	14	12	96	Mundaring	7	10	52
Chidlow	6	10	0	1156	1480	78.11%	24	Preliminary	Mundaring	12	14	86	Bullsbrook	7	6	48
Bullsbrook	5	11	0	995	1594	62.42%	20	Grand	Gidgegannup	16	13	109	Mundaring	7	7	49
Mount Helena	1	15	0	623	2134	29.19%	4									

=== 2010 ===
Hills	Wins	Losses	Draws	For	Against	%	Pts	Final	Team	G	B	Pts	Team	G	B	Pts
Mundaring	15	3	0	2426	1030	235.53%	60	1st semi	Chidlow	13	12	90	Mount Helena	10	15	75
Gidgegannup	13	5	0	2237	1057	211.64%	52	2nd semi	Gidgegannup	14	15	99	Mundaring	5	9	39
Chidlow	12	6	0	1995	1339	148.99%	48	Preliminary	Mundaring	18	10	118	Chidlow	9	9	63
Mount Helena	11	7	0	1735	1550	111.94%	44	Grand	Gidgegannup	10	13	73	Mundaring	6	9	45
Pickering Brook	3	15	0	1244	2143	58.05%	12									
Bullsbrook	0	18	0	514	3032	16.95%	0									

=== 2011 ===
Hills	Wins	Losses	Draws	For	Against	%	Pts	Final	Team	G	B	Pts	Team	G	B	Pts
Chidlow	13	3	0	2138	1117	191.41%	52	1st semi	Pickering Brook	12	7	79	Mount Helena	9	11	65
Gidgegannup	13	3	0	1731	1013	170.88%	52	2nd semi	Gidgegannup	14	8	92	Chidlow	13	12	90
Pickering Brook	12	4	0	1954	943	207.21%	48	Preliminary	Pickering Brook	15	17	107	Chidlow	13	11	89
Mount Helena	8	8	0	1547	1371	112.84%	32	Grand	Gidgegannup	10	9	69	Pickering Brook	8	7	55
Mundaring	8	8	0	1458	1318	110.62%	32									
Bullsbrook	2	14	0	798	1917	41.63%	8									
Wundowie	0	16	0	612	2559	23.92%	0									

=== 2012 ===
Hills	Wins	Losses	Draws	For	Against	%	Pts	Final	Team	G	B	Pts	Team	G	B	Pts
Gidgegannup	15	1	0	2186	732	298.63%	60	1st semi	Chidlow	17	6	108	Mundaring	12	11	83
Pickering Brook	13	3	0	2128	808	263.37%	52	2nd semi	Gidgegannup	15	19	109	Pickering Brook	7	8	50
Chidlow	12	4	0	1665	1248	133.41%	48	Preliminary	Pickering Brook	13	14	92	Chidlow	11	9	75
Mundaring	8	8	0	1226	1563	78.44%	32	Grand	Gidgegannup	15	16	106	Pickering Brook	14	4	88
Mount Helena	3	13	0	1051	1495	70.30%	12									
Wundowie	3	13	0	1049	1998	52.50%	12									
Bullsbrook	2	14	0	535	1835	29.16%	8									

=== 2013 ===
Hills	Wins	Losses	Draws	For	Against	%	Pts	Final	Team	G	B	Pts	Team	G	B	Pts
Chidlow	17	0	0	3188	710	449.01%	68	1st semi	Pickering Brook	13	11	89	Mundaring	9	16	70
Gidgegannup	14	3	0	2571	879	292.49%	56	2nd semi	Chidlow	20	8	128	Gidgegannup	11	8	74
Pickering Brook	12	5	0	2412	1016	237.40%	48	Preliminary	Gidgegannup	14	13	97	Pickering Brook	7	15	57
Mundaring	10	7	0	1760	1589	110.76%	40	Grand	Gidgegannup	11	13	79	Chidlow	9	11	65
Mount Helena	5	12	0	1127	2332	48.33%	20									
Bullsbrook	4	13	0	908	2046	44.38%	16									
Wundowie	4	13	0	969	2184	44.37%	16									
Forrestfield	2	15	0	615	2794	22.01%	8									

=== 2014 ===
Hills	Wins	Losses	Draws	For	Against	%	Pts	Final	Team	G	B	Pts	Team	G	B	Pts
Gidgegannup	15	1	0	2265	674	336.05%	60	1st semi	Parkerville	12	15	87	Pickering Brook	8	6	54
Chidlow	14	2	0	2302	913	252.14%	56	2nd semi	Chidlow	17	5	107	Gidgegannup	11	8	74
Pickering Brook	11	5	0	1410	1123	125.56%	44	Preliminary	Gidgegannup	16	12	108	Parkerville	7	3	45
Parkerville	8	7	1	1426	1437	99.23%	34	Grand	Chidlow	12	9	81	Gidgegannup	11	11	77
Mount Helena	8	8	0	1492	1284	116.20%	32									
Forrestfield	6	9	1	1141	1623	70.30%	26									
Bullsbrook	5	11	0	1215	1455	83.51%	20									
Mundaring	4	12	0	1022	1703	60.01%	16									
Wundowie	0	16	0	600	2661	22.55%	0									

=== 2015 ===
Hills	Wins	Losses	Draws	For	Against	%	Pts	Final	Team	G	B	Pts	Team	G	B	Pts
Gidgegannup	14	1	0	1890	830	227.71%	56	1st semi	Bullsbrook	15	5	95	Parkerville	7	16	58
Chidlow	12	3	0	1800	862	208.82%	48	2nd semi	Chidlow	21	5	131	Gidgegannup	13	8	86
Parkerville	9	6	0	1327	1111	119.44%	36	Preliminary	Gidgegannup	22	13	145	Bullsbrook	9	2	56
Bullsbrook	7	8	0	1392	1013	137.41%	28	Grand	Gidgegannup	19	11	125	Chidlow	7	9	51
Pickering Brook	7	8	0	1276	1281	99.61%	28									
Mount Helena	2	13	0	688	2315	28.86%	8									
Mundaring	1	14	0	900	1841	48.99%	4									

=== 2016 ===
Hills	Wins	Losses	Draws	For	Against	%	Pts	Final	Team	G	B	Pts	Team	G	B	Pts
Gidgegannup	16	0	0	2416	613	394.13%	64	1st semi	Parkerville	21	9	135	Mundaring	5	6	36
Chidlow	12	4	0	1943	1000	194.30%	48	2nd semi	Gidgegannup	19	18	132	Chidlow	7	7	49
Parkerville	9	7	0	1432	1166	122.81%	36	Preliminary	Chidlow	11	4	70	Parkerville	9	7	61
Mundaring	7	9	0	1343	1393	96.41%	28	Grand	Gidgegannup	16	9	105	Chidlow	9	4	58
Mount Helena	7	9	0	1116	1325	84.23%	28									
Pickering Brook	5	11	0	999	1352	73.89%	20									
Bullsbrook	0	16	0	420	2820	14.89%	0									

=== 2017 ===
Hills	Wins	Losses	Draws	For	Against	%	Pts	Final	Team	G	B	Pts	Team	G	B	Pts
Chidlow	13	1	0	1614	674	239.47%	52	1st semi	Parkerville	9	9	63	Pickering Brook	8	7	55
Mundaring	10	4	0	1241	952	130.36%	40	2nd semi	Mundaring	16	11	107	Chidlow	12	7	79
Parkerville	8	6	0	1187	1004	118.23%	32	Preliminary	Chidlow	15	16	106	Parkerville	11	8	74
Pickering Brook	7	7	0	1206	951	126.81%	28	Grand	Chidlow	14	10	94	Mundaring	8	8	56
Gidgegannup	7	7	0	1090	1043	104.51%	28									
Mount Helena	4	10	0	962	1283	74.98%	16									
Bullsbrook	0	14	0	552	1945	28.38%	0									

=== 2018 ===
Hills	Wins	Losses	Draws	For	Against	%	Pts	Final	Team	G	B	Pts	Team	G	B	Pts
Chidlow	15	1	0	1906	828	230.19%	60	1st semi	Mundaring	22	8	140	Gidgegannup	8	11	59
Pickering Brook	11	5	0	1399	970	144.23%	44	2nd semi	Pickering Brook	13	12	90	Chidlow	11	13	79
Mundaring	10	6	0	1797	962	186.80%	40	Preliminary	Chidlow	18	9	117	Mundaring	17	9	111
Gidgegannup	10	6	0	1306	1057	123.56%	40	Grand	Chidlow	10	9	69	Pickering Brook	5	2	32
Mount Helena	8	8	0	1108	1368	80.99%	32									
Parkerville	1	15	0	766	1818	42.13%	4									
Bullsbrook	1	15	0	712	1991	35.76%	4									

=== 2019 ===
Hills	Wins	Losses	Draws	For	Against	%	Pts	Final	Team	G	B	Pts	Team	G	B	Pts
Pickering Brook	13	3	0	1321	771	171.34%	52	1st semi	Chidlow	17	8	110	Mount Helena	6	9	45
Mundaring	13	3	0	1500	881	170.26%	52	2nd semi	Mundaring	13	11	89	Pickering Brook	13	7	85
Mount Helena	11	5	0	1517	1007	150.65%	44	Preliminary	Chidlow	12	9	81	Pickering Brook	10	5	65
Chidlow	8	8	0	1107	1194	92.71%	32	Grand	Mundaring	9	11	65	Chidlow	8	4	52
Gidgegannup	4	12	0	945	1204	78.49%	16									
Swan View	4	12	0	685	1386	49.42%	16									
Bullsbrook	3	13	0	831	1463	56.80%	12									

=== 2020 ===
Hills	Wins	Losses	Draws	For	Against	%	Pts	Final	Team	G	B	Pts	Team	G	B	Pts
Pickering Brook	9	3	0	744	569	130.76%	36	1st semi	Bullsbrook	12	12	84	Chidlow	9	13	67
Mount Helena	8	4	0	863	692	124.71%	32	2nd semi	Mount Helena	9	15	60	Pickering Brook	8	6	54
Chidlow	7	5	0	933	554	168.41%	28	Preliminary	Pickering Brook	14	3	87	Bullsbrook	9	7	61
Bullsbrook	6	6	0	854	733	116.51%	24	Grand	Mount Helena	13	8	86	Pickering Brook	12	8	80
Mundaring	5	7	0	859	744	115.46%	20									
Gidgegannup	5	7	0	719	754	95.36%	20									
Swan View	2	10	0	389	1315	29.58%	8									

=== 2021 ===
Hills	Wins	Losses	Draws	For	Against	%	Pts	Final	Team	G	B	Pts	Team	G	B	Pts
Mundaring	14	1	0	1895	753	251.66%	56	1st semi	Pickering Brook	15	9	99	Bullsbrook	5	12	42
Chidlow	13	2	0	1723	799	215.64%	52	2nd semi	Chidlow	13	8	86	Mundaring	9	11	65
Pickering Brook	11	4	0	1695	771	219.84%	44	Preliminary	Pickering Brook	18	10	118	Mundaring	7	9	51
Bullsbrook	9	6	0	1092	1125	97.07%	36	Grand	Chidlow	16	13	109	Pickering Brook	9	7	61
Gidgegannup	6	9	0	1044	1314	79.45%	24									
Mount Helena	3	12	0	921	1468	62.74%	12									
Warwick-Greenwood	2	13	0	683	1687	40.49%	8									
Swan View	2	13	0	681	1817	37.48%	8									

=== 2022 ===
Hills	Wins	Losses	Draws	For	Against	%	Pts	Final	Team	G	B	Pts	Team	G	B	Pts
Pickering Brook	14	2	0	2078	763	272.35%	56	1st semi	Mundaring	10	9	69	Bullsbrook	8	14	62
Chidlow	13	2	0	1835	831	220.82%	52	2nd semi	Pickering Brook	17	12	114	Chidlow	15	4	94
Mundaring	9	6	0	1483	1009	146.98%	36	Preliminary	Chidlow	19	15	129	Mundaring	7	6	48
Bullsbrook	9	6	0	1226	1101	111.35%	36	Grand	Chidlow	15	13	103	Pickering Brook	8	10	58
Gidgegannup	5	11	0	1122	1517	73.96%	20									
Mount Helena	3	13	0	879	1930	62.74%	12									
Warwick-Greenwood	1	13	0	495	1967	25.17%	4									

=== 2023 ===
Hills	Wins	Losses	Draws	For	Against	%	Pts	Final	Team	G	B	Pts	Team	G	B	Pts
Pickering Brook	15	1	0	2021	738	273.85%	60	1st semi	Swan View	11	14	80	Gidgegannup	11	8	74
Chidlow	12	4	0	1922	880	218.41%	48	2nd semi	Pickering Brook	12	9	81	Chidlow	11	10	76
Swan View	11	5	0	1356	866	156.58%	44	Preliminary	Chidlow	14	15	99	Swan View	6	8	44
Gidgegannup	11	5	0	1343	1032	130.14%	44	Grand	Pickering Brook	13	14	92	Chidlow	9	8	62
Mundaring	7	9	0	1249	1148	108.80%	28									
Bullsbrook	6	10	0	1007	1402	71.83%	24									
Mount Helena	1	15	0	677	2026	33.43%	4									
Warwick-Greenwood	1	15	0	428	1911	22.40%	4									

=== 2024 ===
Hills	Wins	Losses	Draws	For	Against	%	Pts	Final	Team	G	B	Pts	Team	G	B	Pts
Pickering Brook	14	2	0	1940	490	395.92%	56	1st semi	Chidlow	13	9	87	Gidgegannup	12	10	82
Swan View	14	2	0	1858	587	316.52%	56	2nd semi	Pickering Brook	11	11	77	Swan View	9	19	73
Chidlow	10	6	0	1547	1162	133.13%	40	Preliminary	Swan View	20	17	137	Chidlow	5	7	37
Gidgegannup	8	7	0	1082	1316	82.22%	32	Grand	Swan View	17	10	112	Pickering Brook	9	6	60
Mundaring	7	9	0	1427	1327	107.54%	28									
Mount Helena	2	14	0	590	2285	25.82%	8									
Bullsbrook	1	15	0	749	2026	36.97%	4									

=== 2025 ===
Hills	Wins	Losses	Draws	For	Against	%	Pts	Final	Team	G	B	Pts	Team	G	B	Pts
Swan View	14	2	0	1722	782	220.20%	56	1st semi	Mundaring	8	7	57	Pickering Brook	8	7	55
Chidlow	13	3	0	1571	966	162.63%	52	2nd semi	Chidlow	7	9	51	Swan View	3	6	24
Mundaring	11	5	0	1163	874	133.07%	44	Preliminary	Swan View	17	12	114	Mundaring	8	11	59
Pickering Brook	5	11	0	1010	1275	79.22%	20	Grand	Swan View	10	13	73	Chidlow	8	12	60
Gidgegannup	4	12	0	838	1419	59.06%	16									
Mount Helena	1	15	0	735	1723	42.66%	4									

=== 2026 ===
Hills	Wins	Losses	Draws	For	Against	%	Pts	Final	Team	G	B	Pts	Team	G	B	Pts
Chidlow	16	1	1	2362	914	258.42%	66	1st semi	Mt Helena	9	12	66	Gidgegannup	9	10	64
Mundaring	14	4	0	1662	1124	147.86%	56	2nd semi	Chidlow	20	13	133	Mundaring	7	9	51
Mt Helena	9	8	1	1580	1434	110.18%	38	Preliminary	Mundaring	9	3	57	Mt Helena	6	16	52
Gidgegannup	8	10	0	1243	1539	80.77%	32	Grand	Chidlow	21	15	141	Mundaring	4	4	28
Pickering Brook	3	15	0	1013	1817	55.75%	12									
Midland	3	15	0	1113	2145	51.89%	12									
