= Tregenna =

Family name

Tregenna is a surname of Cornish origin. Recorded variations include Treganna, Tregona, Tregannah, Tregunna, Tregunno, Tregensoe, Tregensowe, Tregenza, and Tregenzo. The name is believed to have originated in the phrase tre-cenue (also tre-gonyow or tre-kensa), meaning the first or foremost farm or homestead on the downs. Examples from the church registers of Cornwall date to at least as early as 1547.

The name Tregenna may refer specifically to:

- Tregenna Castle, an 18th-century castle in St Ives, Cornwall
- Catherine Tregenna, Welsh playwright, television screenwriter and actress
- Fiona Tregenna, South African economist
- SS Tregenna, a Hain Line steamship launched in 1919 and sunk in 1940
- SS Tregenna (1880), a Hain Line steamship launched in 1880
- "Tregenna Afternoons", a song by English musician Anthony Phillips, released in 1978 on the album Private Parts & Pieces

== See also ==
- Cornish surnames
- Tregenza (surname)
- Thomas Tregenna Biddulph (1763–1838), English cleric
- Canton, Cardiff, Treganna in Welsh
