= SS Tregenna =

Coordinates: 58°22′N 15°42′W

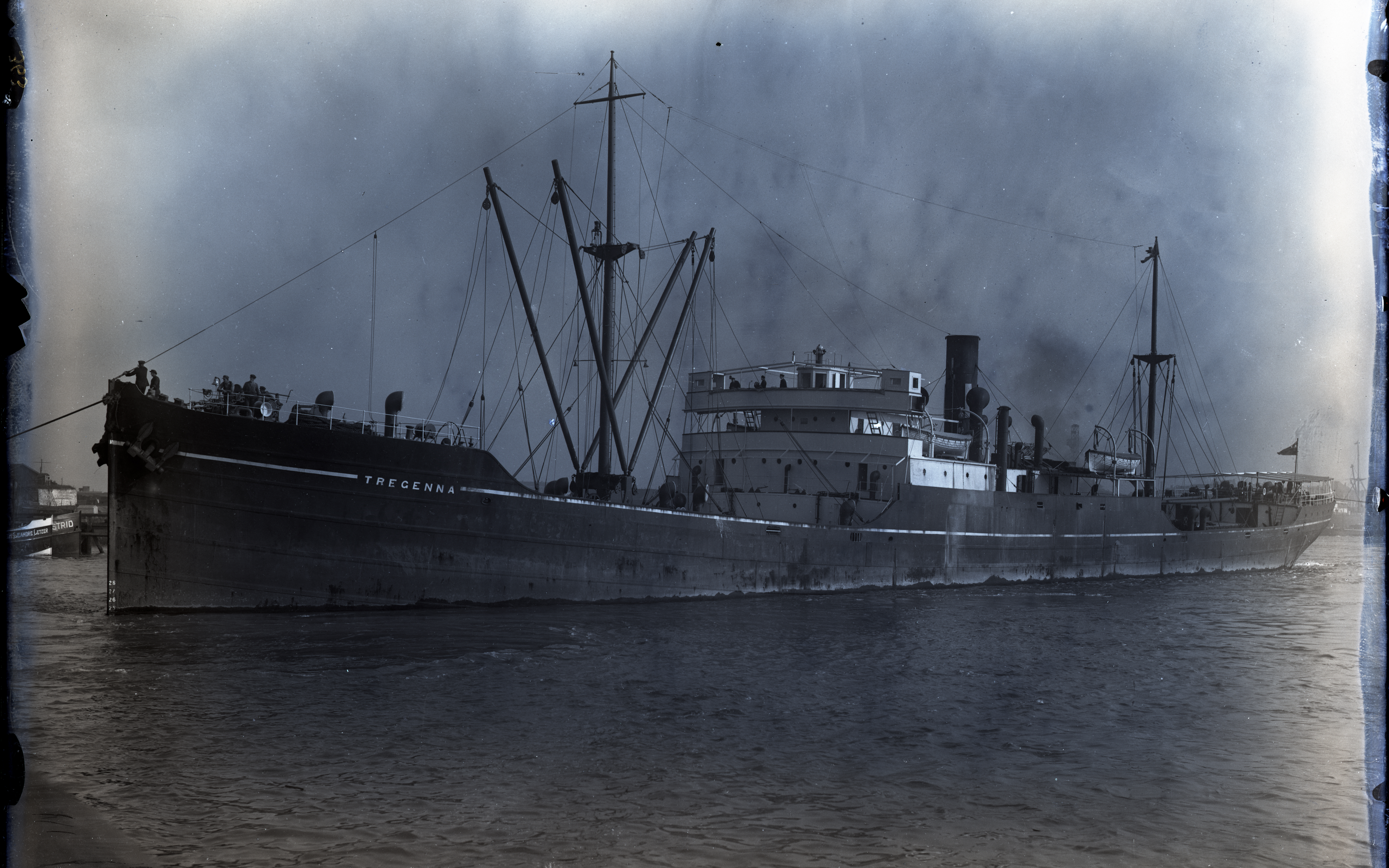

History

United Kingdom
- Name: Tregenna
- Namesake: Tregenna
- Owner: Hain Steam Ship Co
- Operator: Foster, Hain & Read (until 1932)
- Port of registry: St Ives
- Builder: William Gray & Co, West Hartlepool
- Yard number: 915
- Launched: 1 May 1919
- Completed: July 1919
- Identification: UK official number 142570; code letters KBSW (until 1933); call sign GCDX (1934 onward)
- Fate: Sunk 17 September 1940

General characteristics
- Class & type: War Standard type B
- Tonnage: 5,242 GRT, 3,201 NRT
- Length: 400.1 ft (122.0 m)
- Beam: 52.3 ft (15.9 m)
- Draught: 25 ft 4 in (7.72 m)
- Depth: 28.4 ft (8.7 m)
- Installed power: 517 NHP
- Propulsion: triple expansion steam engine
- Speed: 11 knots (20 km/h)
- Crew: 37
- Sensors & processing systems: wireless direction finding
- Armament: DEMS

SS Tregenna was a cargo steamship that was launched in England in 1919 and sunk by a U-boat in the Battle of the Atlantic in 1940 with the loss of 33 of her 37 crew. She was laid down as War Bulldog, but the Hain Steam Ship Co bought her before she was completed and renamed her Tregenna.

== Building ==
William Gray & Company built Tregenna at its shipyard in West Hartlepool. She was built to the Shipping Controller's First World War standard design B. She was launched on 1 May 1919 and completed that July.

Gray's Central Marine Engineering Works in West Hartlepool built Tregenna's three-cylinder triple expansion steam engine. It was rated at 517 NHP and gave her a speed of 11 knots (20 km/h).

== Peacetime service ==
In August 1921 Tregenna reported sighting the wreckage of a SNETA Farman Goliath aircraft that had ditched in the English Channel.

On 7 August 1930 Tregenna ran aground at Alligator Pond, Jamaica. She was refloated on 10 August 1930 and returned to service.

In 1933–34 the call sign GCDX superseded Tregenna's code letters KBSW.

== Second World War service ==
From November 1939 to February 1940 Tregenna sailed from New Zealand via New South Wales and South Africa to Freetown in Sierra Leone, where she joined Convoy SL 18 to return to Liverpool in England. In March and April 1940 she sailed to and from northern Norway. She left Ålesund with Convoy HN 25 on 9 April, the day after the German invasion of Norway began.

From May 1940 Tregenna made transatlantic crossings to bring steel from Philadelphia to South Wales, sailing eastbound in HX convoys from Halifax, Nova Scotia to UK waters. That June she sailed in Convoy HX 49, and discharged her cargo in Swansea.

=== Loss ===
On 1 September Tregenna left Philadelphia carrying 8,000 tons of steel bound for Newport. On 5 September she joined Convoy HX 71 from Halifax. HX 91 had nine columns, and Tregenna was the first ship of the ninth column.

On 17 September HX 71 was in the Western Approaches west of Scotland. At 1626 hrs that afternoon U-65 hit Tregenna with one torpedo 78 nautical miles (144 km) northwest of Rockall. Tregenna sank rapidly, killing her Master, 31 members of her crew and a DEMS gunner. Another member of HX 71, the cargo ship Filleigh, rescued four survivors and landed them at Avonmouth.

== See also ==
SS Tregarthen
