= SS Tregarthen =

Cargo Steamship (1936-1941)

Coordinates: 46°17′N 36°20′W

History

United Kingdom
- Name: Tregarthen
- Owner: Hain Steam Ship Co
- Port of registry: London
- Builder: Lithgows, Port Glasgow
- Yard number: 884
- Launched: 30 July 1936
- Completed: September 1936
- Identification: UK official number 164706; call sign GZCD
- Fate: Sunk by torpedo, 6 June 1941

General characteristics
- Type: Cargo ship
- Tonnage: 5,201 GRT, 3,067 NRT
- Length: 432.3 ft (131.8 m)
- Beam: 56.2 ft (17.1 m)
- Draught: 24 ft 9 in (7.54 m)
- Depth: 24.8 ft (7.6 m)
- Decks: 1
- Installed power: 469 NHP
- Propulsion: triple expansion steam engine; plus exhaust turbine driving steam compressor
- Speed: 11 knots (20 km/h)
- Crew: 42 + 3 DEMS gunners
- Sensors & processing systems: wireless direction finding
- Notes: sister ship: Trewellard

SS Tregarthen was a cargo steamship that was built in Scotland for the Hain Steam Ship Co in 1936. She was sunk with all hands by a U-boat in 1941 in the Battle of the Atlantic.

She was the third ship to be called Tregarthen in the Hain SS Co fleet. The first was a steamship that was launched in 1904, sold in 1911 and renamed. The second was a steamship that was launched in 1913, sold in 1933 and renamed.

== Building ==
In 1936 Lithgows built a pair of steamships in its Port Glasgow shipyard for the Hain SS Co. Trewellard was launched on 16 June 1936 and completed that July. Her sister ship Tregarthen was launched on 30 July and completed that September.

Tregarthen's registered length was 432.3 ft (131.8 m), her beam was 56.2 ft (17.1 m) and her depth was 24.8 ft (7.6 m). Her tonnages were 5,201 GRT and 3,067 NRT.

Tregarthen had a single screw. David Rowan and Co of Glasgow built her engines. Her main propulsion was a three-cylinder triple expansion steam engine. Exhaust steam from its low-pressure cylinder drove a low-pressure steam turbine, which in turn drove a steam compressor. Her turbine drove the same propeller as her piston engine. Between them the two engines were rated at 469 NHP and gave Tregarthen a speed of 11 knots (20 km/h).

== Second World War service ==
In the Second World War Tregarthen mostly made transatlantic crossings, bringing either grain or iron and steel from North America to Britain, and on one occasion taking coal from Britain to Canada. In March 1940 she took coal from Britain to Freetown in Sierra Leone. She returned to Britain that May carrying iron ore. In July 1940 she took coal from Canada to Reykjavík in Canadian-occupied Iceland.

Tregarthen made each of her eastbound Atlantic crossings with the protection of an HX convoy from Halifax, Nova Scotia to Britain. In September 1940 she was Rear Admiral HH Rogers' commodore ship in Convoy HX 72, which lost 11 ships to a U-boat wolf pack attack.

Tregarthen began most of her westbound Atlantic crossings with the protection of an OB (Outward Bound) convoy. In March 1941 she took part on Convoy OB 293, whose escorts sank two U-boats including U-47.

=== Loss ===
On 24 May 1941 Tregarthen left Cardiff carrying 7,800 tons of coal bound for Kingston, Jamaica. Off Milford Haven she joined Convoy OB 327, which took her out into the Atlantic and dispersed on 1 June.

At 2325 hrs on 6 June Tregarthen was in mid-Atlantic when two torpedoes fired by U-48 hit her in the stern. She capsized and sank within three minutes, killing all 42 of her crew and her three DEMS gunners.

== See also ==
SS Tregenna
