= Sunday Football League (2024) =

- Sport: Australian rules football
- Founded: 1993; 33 years ago
- No. of teams: 6
- Most recent champion: Koongamia (2) (2026)
- Most titles: Cockburn (7)
- Website: sundayfooty.com.au

The Sunday Football League (SFL) is an Australian rules football competition based in Perth, Western Australia.

It was founded in 1993 as the Mercantile Football Association, and was renamed to the Metro Football League in 2012. It adopted its current name ahead of the 2024 season.

The league currently consists of six clubs; a further 33 clubs have competed across its three decades.

== History ==
=== Mercantile Football Association (1993–2011) ===
Formerly known as the Mercantile Football Association, the league had its origins as a social league playing fortnightly in the late 1980s. Competing clubs included Cockburn Cement, Komatsu and the Rosemount Hotel.

A change in the administration in the late 1990s saw a more formalised competition, meaning incorporation of the league, board of control, a regular season, transfers, and accredited umpires officiating. New clubs joining had more of a community base, rather than social or workplace, with some of those being Quinns and Ellenbrook. Transitions in the clubs occurred also, with Cockburn Cement becoming Cockburn and based in that suburb. Yanchep and Dwellingup also became active in promoting the game and junior development in their areas.

The league made headlines in 2009 when former Richmond AFL player Andrew Krakouer, imprisoned for assault, played for the Wooroloo Prison Farm football team whilst serving his sentence. The Wooroloo team went through the season undefeated and won the grand final.

=== Metro Football League (2012–2023) ===
The Mercantile Football Association (MFA) changed its name to Metro Football League (MFL) in 2012. Bayswater and Queens Park joined the MFL for season 2013, with Baldivis and Secret Harbour leaving the MFL.

=== Sunday Football League (2024–present) ===
The league changed its name to the Sunday Football League following the 2023 season. A number of clubs departed the league prior to the 2024 season, with Dwellingup entering recess, Brighton Seahawks merging with ECU in the Perth Football League and South Mandurah and Armadale withdrawing their teams. Warwick Greenwood re-joined the league following 3 seasons in the Hills Football Association.

== Current clubs ==
| Club | Colours | Nickname | Home Ground | Former League | Est. | Years in SFL | MFL/SFL Premierships | |
| Club | Colours | Nickname | Home Ground | Former League | Est. | Years in SFL | Total | Years |
|---|---|---|---|---|---|---|---|---|
| Beechboro | | Bombers | Altone Park, Beechboro | WAAFL | 1999 | 2018– | 1 | 2025 |
| Girrawheen Koondoola | | Jets | John Moloney Park, Marangaroo | – | 2026 | 2026– | 0 | - |
| Innaloo | | Bulldogs | Birralee Park, Innaloo | WAAFL | 1964 | 2000–2006, 2008– | 1 | Div 2: 2010 |
| Koongamia | | Crows | Koongamia Oval, Koongamia | WAAFL | 1993 | 2011– | 2 | Div 1: 2023, 2026 |
| Queens Park | | Bulldogs | Queens Park Reserve, Queens Park | – | 2013 | 2013– | 7 | Div 1: 2016, 2017, 2018, 2020, 2021, 2022; Div 2: 2013 |
| South Mandurah Thirds | | Falcons | Falcon Reserve, Falcon | – | 1982 | 2023, 2025- | 0 | - |

=== Locations ===
Locations of the 2026 Sunday FL clubs.

== Former clubs ==
| Club | Colours | Nickname | Home Ground | Former League | Est. | Years in SFL | MFL/SFL Premierships | | Fate |
| Club | Colours | Nickname | Home Ground | Former League | Est. | Years in SFL | Total | Years | Fate |
|---|---|---|---|---|---|---|---|---|---|
| Applecross | | Hawks | Shirley Strickland Reserve, Ardross | WAFA | 1969 | 1995–2002 | 0 | - | Returned to WAFA in 2003 |
| Armadale Reserves | | Demons | Gwynne Park, Armadale | – | 1909 | 2023 | 0 | - | Left league |
| Baldivis Thirds | | Brumbies | Arpenteur Park, Baldivis | – | 2005 | 2012–2013, 2015–2018 | 1 | Div 2: 2017 | Moved to Perth FL in 2019 |
| Bayswater Reserves | | Blues | Hillcrest Reserve, Bayswater | PFL | 1946 | 2005–2006, 2008, 2013–2014, 2016 | 0 | - | Returned to Perth FL in 2017 |
| Boorloo (Balga 2018-2025 Round 10) | (2018-2025 Rd. 10)(2025 Rd. 11-Grand Final) | Jets | Barry Britton Reserve, Balga | – | 2018 | 2018–2025 | 2 | Div 1: 2024 Div 2: 2018 | Replaced by Girrawheen-Koondoola in 2026 |
| Brighton (Alkimos 2015-16) | | Seahawks | Kingsbridge Reserve, Butler | – | 2014 | 2014-2023 | 2 | Div 2: 2015, 2019, 2023 | Absorbed by ECU Jets following 2023 season |
| Cockburn | | Cobras | Davilak Reserve, Hamilton Hill | – | 1993 | 1993–2011 | 7 | Div 1: 1993, 1995, 1997, 1999, 2005, 2006, 2008 | Moved to Perth FL following 2011 season |
| Como | | Tigers | | – | 1993 | 1993–1999 | 2 | Div 1: 1996, 1998 | Folded after 1999 season |
| Cowan University | | Hawks | Robinson Reserve, Tuart Hill | – | 2004 | 2004–2007 | 0 | - | Merged with Noranda JFC to form Noranda-ECU in 2008 |
| Dwellingup | | Razorbacks | Dwellingup Oval, Dwellingup | PFL | 1993 | 1993–2000, 2003–2018, 2022–2023, 2025 | 3 | Div 1: 1994, 2008, 2014 | In recess |
| ECU Reserves | | Jets | Windemere Park, Joondalup | – | 2015 | 2019 | 0 | - | Moved to Perth FL in 2020 |
| Ellenbrook | | Eels | Coolamon Park, Ellenbrook | – | 2002 | 2002 | 0 | - | Moved to Hills FA following 2002 season |
| Gosnells Thirds | | Hawks | Gosnells Oval, Gosnells | – | 1914 | 2018, 2022 | 0 | - | Left league |
| Jandakot | | Jets | Atwell Reserve, Atwell | – | 2009 | 2009–2010 | 0 | - | Moved to Perth FL following 2010 season |
| Karnup-Serpentine | | Kings | Clem Kentish Oval, Serpentine | – | 2022 | 2022 | 0 | - | Folded after 2022 season |
| Kelmscott | | Bulldogs | John Dunn Oval, Kelmscott | PFL | 1897 | 2018–2021 | 1 | Div 1: 2019 | Moved to Perth FL following 2021 season |
| Kenwick Thirds | | Royals | Mills Park, Beckenham | – | 1948 | 2019 | 0 | - | Left league |
| Kingsley Thirds | | Cats | Kinglsey Park, Kingsley | – | 1994 | 2002 | 0 | - | Moved to Perth FL following 2002 season |
| Kingsway (Wanneroo-Kingsway 2007) | | Roos | Kingsway Sporting Complex, Madeley | WAAFL | 1948 | 2007–2010 | 1 | Div 1: 2007 | Moved to Perth FL following 2007 season |
| Kwinana | | Knights | Medina Oval, Medina | PFL | 1962 | 2006–2014 | 3 | Div 1: 2010, 2013; Div 1 Res: 2010 | Moved to Perth FL following 2014 season |
| Midland | | Tigers | North Swan Park, Middle Swan | WAFA | 1946 | 2004–2025 | 4 | Div 2: 2009, 2012, 2016, 2022 | Moved to Hills FA following 2025 season |
| Midvale | | Lions | Morrison Park, Forrestfield | HFA | 2001 | 2003–2004 | 2 | Div 1: 2003, 2004 | Folded after 2004 season |
| Morley | | Bulldogs | RA Cook Reserve, Bedford | – | 2000 | 2000–2001 | 0 | - | Folded after 2001 season |
| Murdoch | | Lions | Murdoch University Sports Ground, Murdoch | WAFA | 1998 | 2000 | 0 | - | Folded after 2000 season |
| Murdoch University | | | Murdoch University Sports Ground, Murdoch | – | 2008 | 2008–2009 | 0 | - | Folded after 2009 season |
| Murdoch University | | Vikings | Murdoch University Sports Ground, Murdoch | – | 2021 | 2021–2022 | 0 | - | Folded after 2022 season |
| Noranda-ECU | | Hawks | Lightning Park, Noranda | – | 2008 | 2008–2010 | 0 | - | Moved to Perth FL following 2010 season |
| Osborne Park | | Saints | Robinson Reserve, Tuart Hill | – | 2007 | 2007–2011 | 0 | - | Moved to Perth FL following 2011 season |
| Quinns Districts | | Bulls | Anthony Waring Park, Clarkson | – | 2000 | 2000–2001 | 1 | Div 1: 2001 | Moved to Perth FL following 2001 season |
| Safety Bay | | Stingers | Stan Twight Reserve, Rockingham | – | 2010 | 2014, 2017–2019, 2022 | 0 | - | Played in Peel FL in 2020-21. Returned to Perth FL following 2014 and 2022 seasons |
| Secret Harbour | | Dockers | Rhonda Scarrott Park, Golden Bay | – | 2011 | 2011–2012 | 2 | Div 1: 2011, 2012 | Moved to Perth FL following 2012 season |
| Wanneroo Fifths | | Roos | Wanneroo Showgrounds, Wanneroo | – | 1985 | 2015, 2018 | 0 | - | Left league |
| Warwick-Greenwood (Greenwood 2003-06) | (2003-06)(2007-?)(?-2020)(2024) | Bulls | Percy Doyle Reserve, Duncraig | HFA | 2003 | 2003-2020, 2024 | 3 | Div 1: 2015; Div 2: 2011, 2020 | Moved to Hills FA in 2021. Moved to Perth FL in 2025 |
| Wooroloo | | Bombers | Wooroloo Prison Farm, Wooroloo | HFA | 2006 | 2009 | 1 | Div 1: 2009 | Entered recess in 2010. Re-formed as Swan Districts in WAAFL in 2011 |
| Yanchep | (1997-?) (?-2014) | Red Hawks | Oldham Reserve, Yanchep | – | 1997 | 1997–2014 | 3 | Div 1: 2000, 2002, 2014 | Moved to Perth FL following 2014 season |

== Grand final results ==
Division 1

| Year | Premiers | Score | Runners up | Score |
|---|---|---|---|---|
| 1993 | Cockburn | | Dwellingup | |
| 1994 | Dwellingup | | Cockburn | |
| 1995 | Cockburn | | Dwellingup | |
| 1996 | Como Tigers | | Cockburn | |
| 1997 | Cockburn | | Dwellingup | |
| 1998 | Como Tigers | | Cockburn | |
| 1999 | Cockburn | 9.9 (63) | Yanchep | 9.3 (57) |
| 2000 | Yanchep | 10.9 (69) | Cockburn | 6.10 (46) |
| 2001 | Quinns Districts | 13.9 (87) | Yanchep | 8.8 (56) |
| 2002 | Yanchep | 20.13 (133) | Ellenbrook | 14.8 (92) |
| 2003 | Midvale | 16.15 (111) | Yanchep | 10.10 (70) |
| 2004 | Midvale | 10.17 (77) | Innaloo | 7.13 (55) |
| 2005 | Cockburn | 19.13 (127) | Dwellingup | 5.11 (41) |
| 2006 | Cockburn | 15.18 (108) | Yanchep | 8.9 (57) |
| 2007 | Wanneroo-Kingsway | 14.16 (100) | Midland | 12.9 (81) |
| 2008 | Cockburn | 19.14 (128) | Noranda ECU | 15.3 (93) |
| 2009 | Wooroloo | 20.14 (134) | Cockburn | 13.16 (94) |
| 2010 | Kwinana | 7.8 (50) | Noranda ECU | 4.15 (39) |
| 2011 | Secret Harbour | 16.11 (107) | Osborne Park | 12.8 (80) |
| 2012 | Secret Harbour | 12.19 (91) | Kwinana | 10.11 (71) |
| 2013 | Kwinana | 13.11 (89) | Yanchep | 9.5 (59) |
| 2014 | Yanchep | 13.11 (89) | Warwick Greenwood | 11.11 (77) |
| 2015 | Warwick Greenwood | 20.7 (127) | Baldivis | 12.8 (80) |
| 2016 | Warwick greenwood | 13.15 (93) | midland | 8.5 (53) |
| 2017 | Queens Park | 15.11 (101) | Safety Bay | 11.7 (73) |
| 2018 | Queens Park | 15.8 (98) | Midland | 7.10 (52) |
| 2019 | Kelmscott | 13.11 (89) | Queens Park | 10.16 (76) |
| 2020 | Queens Park | 8.12 (60) | Kelmscott | 7.16 (58) |
| 2021 | Queens Park | 22.14 (146) | Koongamia | 13.3 (81) |
| 2022 | Queens Park | 24.13 (157) | Innaloo | 10.6 (66) |
| 2023 | Koongamia | 10.14 (74) | Queens Park | 8.11 (59) |
| 2024 | Balga | 13.12 (90) | Innaloo | 9.10 (64) |
| 2025 | Beechboro | 13.8 (86) | Boorloo | 10.10 (70) |
| 2026 | Koongamia | 11.8 (74) | Innaloo | 5.13 (43) |

Division 2

| Year | Premiers | Score | Runners up | Score |
|---|---|---|---|---|
| 2008 | Dwellingup | 17.22 (124) | Innaloo | 12.12 (84) |
| 2009 | Midland | 16.23 (119) | Osborne Park | 13.13 (91) |
| 2010 | Innaloo | 16.2 (98) | Warwick Greenwood | 9.9 (63) |
| 2011 | Warwick Greenwood | 20.16 (136) | Cockburn | 5.12 (42) |
| 2012 | Midland | 15.8 (98) | Secret Harbour | 11.9 (75) |
| 2013 | Queens Park | 15.13 (103) | Kwinana | 7.8 (50) |
| 2014 | Dwellingup | 15.11 (101) | Safety Bay | 14.5 (89) |
| 2015 | Alkimos | 16.17 (113) | Midland | 6.8 (44) |
| 2016 | Midland | 14.12 (96) | Dwellingup | 11.5 (71) |
| 2017 | Baldivis | 13.8 (86) | Dwellingup | 9.9 (63) |
| 2018 | Balga | 13.12 (90) | Koongamia | 10.8 (68) |
| 2019 | Brighton | 16.8 (104) | Beechboro | 9.6 (60) |
| 2020 | Warwick Greenwood | 12.3 (75) | Kelmscott | 7.7 (49) |
| 2021 | Queens Park | 3.1 (19) | Midland | 7.3 (45) |
| 2022 | Midland | 8.8 (56) | Gosnells | 7.8 (50) |
| 2023 | Brighton | 14.9 (93) | South Mandurah | 6.10 (46) |
No competition since 2023

Notes:
(1) In 2015, there was only one division. The Division 2 Premiership was decided in a Round Robin series between teams that missed the finals.
(2) In 2016, the competition split into two divisions of 5 teams after Round 11 based on ladder positions. The bottom five teams played for the Division 2 Premiership for the remaining 8 rounds.

Division 1 Reserves

| Year | Premiers | Score | Runners up | Score |
|---|---|---|---|---|
| 2010 | Kwinana | 8.10 (58) | Cockburn | 7.9 (51) |
