= Rod Tregenza =

Australian rules footballer (born 1979)

Personal information
- Full name: Rodney Donald Tregenza
- Nickname: Rocket
- Born: 16 January 1979 (age 47); Tasmania
- Original team: South Mandurah (PFL)
- Draft: 29th pick, 2001 Rookie draft
- Height: 193 cm (6 ft 4 in)
- Position: Full-forward

Playing career^{1}
Years	Club	Games (Goals)
1997	Peel Thunder	4 (5)
1999–2005	East Fremantle	46 (157)
2002	Murray Kangaroos	unknown (58)
2003–04	South Adelaide	unknown (120)

Representative team honours
Years	Team	Games (Goals)
1999–2000	Western Australia	2 (10)
2002	Victoria	1 (0)
- ^{1} Playing statistics correct to the end of 2005.

Career highlights
- Simpson Medal 1999 (state game); East Fremantle leading goalkicker 1999, 2000; Bernie Naylor Medal 1999, 2000; Murray Kangaroos leading goalkicker 2002; South Adelaide leading goalkicker 2003, 2004

Rodney Donald "Rod" Tregenza (born 16 January 1979) is a former Australian rules footballer. Originally playing for the South Mandurah Football Club in the Peel Football League (PFL), Tregenza was a member of Peel Thunder's squad for their first season in the West Australian Football League (WAFL), and later also played for East Fremantle, winning the Bernie Naylor Medal as the leading goalkicker in the competition in 1999 and 2000. He was recruited by the Kangaroos in the Australian Football League (AFL) in the 2001 Rookie draft, but did not play a game for the club, subsequently signing with the South Adelaide Football Club in the South Australian National Football League (SANFL). Tregenza returned to Western Australian in 2005, playing one final season with East Fremantle. He remains a prolific goalkicker with South Mandurah, having kicked over 1000 goals in his time at the club.

== Career ==
Born in Tasmania to Donald Leo Tregenza and Vicki Maree Dell, Tregenza moved with his family to Western Australia at the age of 11. A chronic knee condition meant Tregenza was unable to play football until he was 17 years old, when he began playing with South Mandurah in the PFL. Originally playing for South Fremantle's colts team, he was recruited to Peel Thunder for their inaugural season in the Westar Rules competition in 1997, playing four games and kicking five goals, but returned to South Mandurah for the 1998 season and kicked 161 goals, at the time a competition record. Tregenza also played for Western Australia at the national under-18 carnival in 1997. He returned to Westar Rules football via East Fremantle in 1999, playing 18 games and kicking 57 goals to win the Bernie Naylor Medal as the competition's leading goalkicker. Tregenza also played in the 1999 state game against the Tasmanian State Football League (TSFL), kicking 10 goals to earn the Simpson Medal as best on ground. He continued this form in 2000, kicking a total of 86 goals from 21 games, which included 11 goals against Swan Districts in round 9. He also played in East Fremantle's losing Grand Final side against East Perth.

Tregenza was recruited to the Kangaroos in the AFL with pick 29 in the 2001 Rookie draft. He had a knee reconstruction in 2001, forcing him to miss the entire season. He returned to football in 2002 with the Kangaroos' VFL-affiliate, the Murray Kangaroos, kicking 58 goals before his season was ended midway through the year with broken ribs. He was de-listed by the Kangaroos at the end of the 2002 season, and was recruited by South Adelaide in the South Australian National Football League (SANFL). He spent two seasons at the club, leading the goalkicking in both seasons. Tregenza returned to East Fremantle for the 2005 season, playing seven games and kicking 14 goals before stepping down midway through the season. He continued with South Mandurah in 2006, kicking 172 goals to break his own record set in 1998. He also played in South Mandurah's winning grand final side. In 2008, Tregenza kicked 223 goals for the season from 23 games, a record for any senior football league in Western Australia. He kicked his 1000th career goal for South Mandurah in July 2010, and was appointed coach for the 2011 season.
