= Henry Jullion =

20th-century Anglican priest

Henry Tregenza Jullion (1878–1949) was an Anglican priest and author in the first half of the 20th century.

Jullion was educated at Dorchester Missionary College; and ordained in 1904. After a curacies at St John's Cathedral, Antiga and St Ann, Saint Kitts he held incumbencies at Cayon and St Croix he was archdeacon of the Virgin Islands from 1917 to 1920. He was rector of Parham from 1920 to 1925; and archdeacon of Saint Kitts from 1925 until 1941.
