= Sunday Football League (1984–2008) =

Australian rules football league

- Sport: Australian rules football
- Founded: 1984; 42 years ago
- Folded: 2008; 18 years ago
- No. of teams: 7
- Last champion: Gosnells (2008)
- Most titles: Kenwick (8)

The Sunday Football League Western Australia, commonly known as the Sunday Football League (SFL), was a semi-professional Australian rules football league based in the southern suburbs of Perth, Western Australia. The league was in operation from 1984 to 2008, and Kenwick Royals was the most successful club with eight senior team premierships.

== History ==
The Sunday Football League (SFL) was formed in late 1983 after a proposed merger between the South Suburban Murray Football League (SSMFL) and Western Australian Football Association (WAFA) fell through. The twelve SSMFL clubs were Armadale, Canning, Gosnells, Kalamunda, Kelmscott, Kenwick, Kwinana, Maddington, Mandurah, Rockingham, Thornlie and Willetton. The five WAFA clubs to join were Applecross, Fremantle (later North Fremantle), Osborne Park, South Perth and Wanneroo. Six WAFA clubs decided to stay in that competition rather than join the new league.

=== South Suburban Football ===
Prior to the Sunday Football League being formed, the South Suburban Murray Football League was formed in 1960 when two leagues - the South Suburban Football Association and Murray Districts Football Association - agreed to a trial season. The SSFA had only five teams competing in 1959 (Armadale, Canning, Gosnells, Kelmscott and Maddington) while the MDFA had four teams (Hills, Pinjarra, Mandurah and Waroona). Kenwick, who had been trying since 1958 to join the SSFA, was accepted as the tenth team to remove a bye in each round.

The South Suburban Football Association began in 1910 with three teams, Armadale, Kelmscott and Mundijong. Queens Park joined in 1911, while Mundijong withdrew after five games. Victoria Park joined the SSFA in 1913. Queens Park won the premiership in 1913 after taking the SSFA to court after the league decided to change how the premier team would be selected that year.

The Murray Districts Football Association started in 1938 with five teams (Coolup, Mandurah, North Dandalup, Pinjarra and Waroona). Pinjarra won the first premiership, and Waroona won the next two before the competition was suspended due to World War 2. Waroona won the first two flags after the competition resumed in 1946 and 47. Pinjarra won in 1948 and Mandurah won their first premiership in 1949.

=== West Australian Football Association ===
The West Australian Football Association (WAFA) was established in 1949 as the Mercantile Football Association (MFA). The MFA consisted primarily of work-based clubs such as Boans, Daily News, Foys, Hardies, Mails, Sunday Times, Wesfarmers and Telegraphs. In 1954, the league was renamed as the Sunday National Football League (SNFL) and there were separate A-Grade and B-Grade competitions with promotion and relegation. The more traditional suburban-based teams were introduced in the 1950s, such as Maylands, Scarborough (not related to the current Club of the same name), Rockingham and Osborne Park. Work-based teams also changed names, with Wesfarmers becoming North Perth, Tramways becoming Leederville, and Sunday Times becoming Metropolitans.

In the 1960s, the league expanded with the inclusion of clubs from Wanneroo, Midland, Belmont, Cockburn, Bayswater and East Fremantle. By 1964, a Reserves Grade replaced the B-Grade competition, and each Club was required to field two sides. The league also changed name to the West Australian Football Association (WAFA) in 1968. South Perth, Applecross and Mosman Park were introduced in the 1970s. In 1980, the WAFA absorbed six teams from the disbanded Fremantle Ex-Scholars Football Association and a Division 2 was created. The WAFA reverted to a single grade competition in 1984 after Applecross, Fremantle (later North Fremantle), Osborne Park, South Perth and Wanneroo left to join the Sunday Football League.

The final year of the WAFA was in 1987 with teams from Manning, Mosman Park, Midland, Cockburn, Belmont and Tuart Hill. Over its 39 years, a total of 49 different clubs competed in the WAFA.

=== Lower SFL Grades ===
Between 1988 and 1991, the SFL managed a second-tier competition (with League, Reserves and Colts grades) known as the Metropolitan Football League (MFL). The MFL initially consisted of six teams, including four teams from the disbanded WAFA - Manning, Mosman Park, Midland and Cockburn - plus Fremantle and Kwinana, who previously competed in the top division of the Sunday Football League. Pinjarra and Mundijong Centrals joined in 1989 after the Murray Districts Football League disbanded, and were joined in 1990 by Waroona and South Mandurah. At the end of 1991, teams from the MFL joined the newly formed Peel Football League.

Between 1994 and 1997, the SFL managed another second-tier competition (with League, Reserves and Colts grades), known initially as the Sunday Amateurs Football League (SAFL). The SAFL initially consisted of seven teams, including Belmont, Midland, Kingsley, Cockburn, Manning, Mosman Park and North Fremantle. A number of these teams had joined after previously competing in the Peel Football League. Kalamunda and Ballajura joined the SAFL in 1995, replacing Cockburn and Manning. In 1997, the League was re-badged as the Sunday Football League (SFL) Division 2, and was reduced to four teams, after Belmont, Midland and North Fremantle left. Belmont joined the SFL at that time.

Between 1985 and 2008, the SFL managed a single-grade, third-tier competition, known initially as the SFL Saturday Amateurs Division. The Saturday Amateurs Division included the Thirds teams from those Division 1 clubs that had sufficient players to do so. The grade was renamed the SFL Division 3 from 1994 to 1997, but returned to the SFL Saturday Amateurs Division from 1998 to 2003. In 2004, there was revamp of the grade to include other single-team clubs, and there was a renaming to the West Australian Football Association (WAFA), which was a tribute to the former WAFA that existed between 1949 and 1987.

=== Disbanding ===
In February 2009 it was announced that the league would not be operating for the 2009 football season with clubs applying to join the Western Australian Amateur Football League and the Peel Football League.

Armadale were admitted to the Peel Football League and the remaining clubs were admitted to the West Australian Amateur Football League.

It was an unfortunate event that clubs which had high public profiles in the SFL largely faded from public view when they were thrust into the lower-leagues of the Amateurs.

== Clubs ==
=== SFL Division 1 ===
==== Final clubs ====
Club	Colours	Nickname	Home Ground	Former League	Est.	Years in SFL	SFL Premierships		Fate
Club	Colours	Nickname	Home Ground	Former League	Est.	Years in SFL	Total	Years	Fate
Armadale		Demons	Gwynne Park, Armadale	SSMFL	1909	1984-2008	1	2001	Moved to Peel FL in 2009
Canning-Victoria Park-South Perth		Tigers	Wyong Reserve, Bentley	–	2001	2001-2008	0	-	Moved to WAAFL in 2009
Gosnells		Hawks	Gosnells Oval, Gosnells	SSMFL	1914	1984-2008	2	1989, 2008	Moved to WAAFL in 2009
Kelmscott		Bulldogs	John Dunn Oval, Kelmscott	SSMFL	1897	1984-2008	1	2000	Moved to WAAFL in 2009
Kenwick		Royals	Mills Park, Beckenham	SSMFL	1948	1984-2008	8	1996, 1997, 1998, 1999, 2002, 2004, 2005, 2006	Moved to WAAFL in 2009
Maddington		Bulls	Harmony Fields, Maddington	SSMFL	1923	1984-2008	2	2003, 2007	Moved to WAAFL in 2009
Thornlie		Lions	Berehaven Oval, Thornlie	SSMFL	1970	1984-2008	2	1993, 1995	Moved to WAAFL in 2009

==== Former clubs ====
Club	Colours	Nickname	Home Ground	Former League	Est.	Years in SFL	SFL Premierships		Fate
Club	Colours	Nickname	Home Ground	Former League	Est.	Years in SFL	Total	Years	Fate
Applecross		Hawks	Shirley Strickland Reserve, Ardross	WAFA	1969	1984-1994	0	-	Moved to Mercantile FA in 1995
Belmont		Bombers	Forster Park, Cloverdale	PFL	1991	1997-1998	0	-	Merged with Redcliffe to form Belmont Districts in WAAFL in 1999
Canning		Tigers	Wyong Reserve, Bentley	SSMFL	1905	1984-2000	1	1994	Merged with Victoria Park-South Perth to form Canning-Victoria-South Perth in 2001
Fremantle		Magpies	Gil Fraser Reserve, North Fremantle	WAFA	1928	1984-1987	0	-	Moved to Metropolitan FL in 1988
Kalamunda		Cougars	Ray Owen Reserve, Lesmurdie	SSMFL	1965	1984-2000	2	1984, 1985	Moved to WAAFL in 2001
Kwinana		Knights	Medina Oval, Medina	SSMFL	1962	1984-1987	0	-	Moved to Metropolitan FL in 1988
Mandurah		Mustangs	Rushton Park, Mandurah	SSMFL	1927	1984-1991	0	-	Formed Peel FL in 1992
Osborne Park		Saints	Richard Guelfi Reserve, Balcatta	WAFA	1920s	1984-1997	3	1986, 1987, 1990	Merged with Balcatta to form Stirling in WAAFL in 1998
Rockingham		Rams	Anniversary Park, Rockingham	SSMFL	1954	1984-1986	0	-	Moved to WAAFL in 1987
Swan Valley		Valley	Swan Valley Sporting Complex, Herne Hill	HFA	1965	2002-2003	0	-	Returned to Hills FA in 2004
Victoria Park-South Perth	(1984-96)(1997-2000)	Raiders	Lathlain Park, Lathlain Lathlain	WAFA	1931	1984-2000	0	-	Merged with Canning to form Canning-Victoria Park-South Perth in 2001
Wanneroo		Roos	Kingsway Sporting Complex, Madeley	WAFA	1948	1984-2006	3	1988, 1991, 1992	Moved to Mercantile FA in 2007
Willetton		Blues	Burrendah Reserve, Willetton	SSMFL	1976	1984-1997	0	-	Entered recess after 1997 season, re-formed in WAAFL in 1999

=== Saturday Amateurs Division / SFL Division 3 / WAFA ===
==== Final clubs ====
Club	Colours	Nickname	Home Ground	Former League	Est.	Years in SFL	SFL Div 3/WAFA Premierships		Fate
Club	Colours	Nickname	Home Ground	Former League	Est.	Years in SFL	Total	Years	Fate
Bayswater		Blues	Hillcrest Reserve, Bayswater	WAAFL	1946	2005-2008	0	-	Moved to WAAFL in 2009
Forrestdale		Falcons	William Skeet Oval, Forrestdale	WAAFL	1993	1999-2008	1	2007	Moved to WAAFL in 2009
Kenwick		Royals	Mills Park, Beckenham	SSMFL	1948	1990–1992, 1995–2004, 2006–2008	7	1997, 1998, 1999, 2000, 2003, 2005, 2008	Moved to WAAFL in 2009
Koongamia		Crows	Koongamia Oval, Koongamia	–	2000	2000-2008	0	-	Moved to WAAFL in 2009
Mustangs (Sister Kates 2001-04)		Mustangs	Reid Oval, Forrestfield	–	2001	2001-2008	1	2006	Moved to WAAFL in 2009
Nollamara		Roos	Des Penman Reserve, Nollamara	WAAFL	1964	2004-2008	0	-	Moved to WAAFL in 2009
Roleystone		Tigers	Cross Park, Roleystone	–	1987	1987-2008	2	2001, 2002	Moved to WAAFL in 2009
Rossmoyne		Rhinos	Shelley Park, Shelley	WAAFL	1996	2004-2008	0	-	Moved to WAAFL in 2009
Southern River		Falcons	Sutherlands Park, Huntingdale	–	1998	1998-2008	0	-	Moved to WAAFL in 2009
Thornlie		Lions	Thornlie Oval, Thornlie	SSMFL	1970	1991-2008	1	1994	Moved to WAAFL in 2009

==== Former clubs ====
Club	Colours	Nickname	Home Ground	Former League	Est.	Years in SFL	SFL Div 3/WAFA Premierships		Fate
Club	Colours	Nickname	Home Ground	Former League	Est.	Years in SFL	Total	Years	Fate
Applecross		Hawks	Shirley Strickland Oval, Ardross	MFA	1969	1985–1989, 1993, 2003-2006	2	1988, 1989	Folded after 2006 season
Armadale		Demons	Gwynne Park, Armadale	SSMFL	1909	1989-1993	1	1993	Disbanded after 1993 season, league team remained in SFL Division 1
Ballajura		Saints	Kingfisher Oval, Ballajura	–	1995	1998-2001	0	-	Moved to WAAFL in 2001
Beechboro		Bombers	Altone Park, Beechboro	–	1999	1999-2005	0	-	Moved to WAAFL in 2006
Cockburn Lakes		Warriors	Anning Park, South Lake	WAAFL	1980	2004	0	-	Returned to WAAFL in 2005
Ellenbrook		Eels	Coolamon Park, Ellenbrook	HFA	2002	2006	0	-	Moved to WAAFL in 2007
Gosnells		Hawks	Gosnells Oval, Gosnells	SSMFL	1914	1989-1997	2	1995, 1996	Disbanded after 1997 season, league team remained in SFL Division 1
Innaloo		Bulldogs	Birralee Reserve, Innaloo	MFA	1967	2007	0	-	Returned to Mercantile FA in 2008
Kalamunda		Cougars	Ray Owen Reserve, Lesmurdie	SSMFL	1965	1985–1986, 1989, 1991-1992	0	-	Disbanded after 1992 season, league team remained in SFL Division 1
Kelmscott		Bulldogs	John Dunn Oval, Kelmscott	SSMFL	1897	1985–2001, 2003-2004	1	1992	Disbanded after 2004 season, league team remained in SFL Division 1
Koonga Valley (Koongamia 1993-95)	(1993-95) (1996-99)	Kangaroos	Koongamia Oval, Koongamia	–	1993	1993-1999	0	-	Replaced by Koongamia in 2000
Maddington		Bulls	Maddington Oval, Maddington	SSMFL	1923	1986-1990	2	1989, 1990	Disbanded after 1990 season, league team remained in SFL Division 1
Magpies		Magpies	Maddington Oval, Maddington	–	2004	2004-2005	1	2004	Folded after 2005 season
Manning		Maroons	James Miller Oval, Manning	PFL	1986	1995-1996	0	-	Merged with Bankwest to form Manning Rippers in WAAFL in 1997
Midland		Tigers	Midland Oval, Midland	HFA	1946	2003	0	-	Moved to Mercantile FA in 2004
Murdoch		Lions	Murdoch Oval, Murdoch	–	1997	1997-1999	0	-	Moved to Mercantile FA in 2000
Osborne Park		Saints	Richard Guelfi Reserve, Balcatta	WAFA	1920s	1985-1997	3	1985, 1987, 1990	Merged with Balcatta to form Stirling in WAAFL in 1998
St Norberts		Saints	Wyong Reserve, Bentley	WAAFL	1978	2004	0	-	Returned to WAAFL in 2005
Wanneroo		Roos	Kingsway Sporting Complex, Madeley	WAFA	1948	1985–1991, 1994-1997	2	1986, 1988	Disbanded after 1997 season, league team remained in SFL Division 1
Willetton		Blues	Burrendah Reserve, Willetton	WAFA	1976	1985-1995	0	-	Disbanded after 1995 season, league team remained in SFL Division 1
Wonderers		Wonderers	Barry Britton Reserve, Balga	WAAFL	1999	2004, 2006-2007	0	-	Folded after 2007 season

=== Sunday Amateurs FL / SFL Division 2 ===
==== Final clubs ====
Club	Colours	Nickname	Home Ground	Former League	Est.	Years in SFL	SFL Div 2 Premierships		Fate
Club	Colours	Nickname	Home Ground	Former League	Est.	Years in SFL	Total	Years	Fate
Ballajura		Royals	Kingfisher Oval, Ballajura	–	1995	1995-1997	0	-	Moved to Saturday Amateurs Division in 1998
Kalamunda		Cougars	Ray Owen Reserve, Lesmurdie	SSMFL	1965	1995-1997	1	1997	Disbanded after 1997 season, league team remained in SFL Division 1
Kingsley		Cats	Kinglsey Park, Kingsley	–	1994	1994-1997	0	-	Moved to WAAFL in 1998
Mosman Park		Mossies	Tom Perrott Reserve, Mosman Park	PFL	1921	1994-1997	0	-	Returned to WAAFL in 1998

==== Former clubs ====
Club	Colours	Nickname	Home Ground	Former League	Est.	Years in SFL	SFL Div 2 Premierships		Fate
Club	Colours	Nickname	Home Ground	Former League	Est.	Years in SFL	Total	Years	Fate
Belmont		Bombers	Forster Park, Cloverdale	PFL	1991	1994-1996	2	1995, 1996	Promoted to SFL Division 1 in 1997
Cockburn		Eagles	Davilak Reserve, Hamilton Hill	PFL	1967	1994	0	-	Folded after 1994 season
Manning		Maroons	James Miller Oval, Manning	PFL	1986	1994	0	-	Disbanded; continued to field SFL Division 3 side
Midland		Tigers	Midland Oval, Midland	PFL	1946	1994-1996	1	1994	Moved to Hills FA in 1997
North Fremantle		Magpies	Gil Fraser Reserve, North Fremantle	PFL	1928	1994-1996	0	-	Folded after 1996 season

=== Metropolitan Football League ===
Colours	Club	Nickname	Home Ground	Former League	Est.	Years in SFL	MFL Premierships		Fate
Colours	Club	Nickname	Home Ground	Former League	Est.	Years in SFL	Total	Years	Fate
Cockburn		Saints	Davilak Reserve, Hamilton Hill	WAFA	1967	1988–1989, 1991	0	-	Formed Peel FL in 1992
Kwinana		Knights	Medina Oval, Medina	SFL	1962	1988-1991	1	1988	Formed Peel FL in 1992
Manning		Maroons	James Miller Oval, Manning	WAFA	1986	1988-1991	0	-	Formed Peel FL in 1992
Midland		Tigers	Midland Oval, Midland	WAFA	1946	1988-1991	1	1990	Formed Peel FL in 1992
Mosman Park		Mossies	Tom Perrott Reserve, Mosman Park	WAFA	1921	1988-1991	0	-	Formed Peel FL in 1992
Mundijong Centrals		Blues	Mundijong Oval, Mundijong	MDFL	1909	1989-1991	1	1991	Formed Peel FL in 1992
North Fremantle (Fremantle Magpies 1988-89)		Magpies	Gil Fraser Reserve, North Fremantle	SFL	1928	1988-1991	0	-	Formed Peel FL in 1992
Pinjarra		Tigers	Sir Ross McLarty Oval, Pinjarra	MDFL	1911	1989-1991	1	1989	Formed Peel FL in 1992
South Mandurah		Falcons	Falcon Oval, Falcon	MDFL	1982	1990-1991	0	-	Formed Peel FL in 1992
Waroona		Demons	Waroona Oval, Waroona	MDFL		1990-1991	0	-	Formed Peel FL in 1992

== Grand final results ==
=== League grades ===
==== SFL Division 1 - League ====
Year	Premiers	Score	Runners up	Score
1984	Kalamunda	15.18 (108)	Wanneroo	11.10 (76)
1985	Kalamunda	21.15 (141)	Willetton	8.7 (55)
1986	Osborne Park	16.15 (111)	Kalamunda	11.6 (72)
1987	Osborne Park	21.19 (145)	Maddington	12.15 (87)
1988	Wanneroo	17.12 (114)	Maddington	14.16 (100)
1989	Gosnells	13.15 (93)	Wanneroo	12.8 (80)
1990	Osborne Park	13.17 (95)	Kelmscott	11.7 (73)
1991	Wanneroo	24.13 (157)	Armadale	8.5 (53)
1992	Wanneroo	10.17 (77)	Osborne Park	6.17 (53)
1993	Thornlie	20.10 (130)	Canning	10.11 (71)
1994	Canning	15.11 (101)	Osborne Park	13.13 (91)
1995	Thornlie	20.19 (139)	Kenwick	13.7 (85)
1996	Kenwick	15.11 (101)	Armadale	2.9 (21)
1997	Kenwick	15.16 (106)	Armadale	7.12 (54)
1998	Kenwick	13.17 (95)	Armadale	8.6 (54)
1999	Kenwick	14.18 (102)	Gosnells	8.8 (56)
2000	Kelmscott	11.14 (80)	Armadale	10.7 (67)
2001	Armadale	11.9 (75)	Thornlie	9.13 (67)
2002	Kenwick	14.11 (95)	Thornlie	7.7 (49)
2003	Maddington	17.17 (119)	Thornlie	14.6 (90)
2004	Kenwick	19.7 (121)	Maddington	15.7 (97)
2005	Kenwick	12.6 (78)	Maddington	8.8 (56)
2006	Kenwick	16.10 (106)	Gosnells	12.9 (81)
2007	Maddington	14.12 (96)	Kenwick	5.13 (43)
2008	Gosnells	14.16 (100)	Kenwick	8.14 (62)

Note: Results source from Sunday Football League Yearbooks

==== Metropolitan Football League - League ====
Year	Premiers	Score	Runners up	Score
1988	Kwinana	19.16 (130)	Cockburn	9.14 (68)
1989	Pinjarra	14.22 (106)	Midland	11.7 (73)
1990	Midland	16.8 (104)	Mosman Park	10.12 (72)
1991	Mundijong Centrals	14.10 (94)	Midland	12.10 (82)

==== Sunday Amateurs Football League / SFL Division 2 - League ====
Year	Premiers	Score	Runners up	Score
1994	Midland	12.11 (83)	Belmont	9.8 (62)
1995	Belmont	19.15 (129)	Midland	10.3 (63)
1996	Belmont	18.17 (125)	Kalamunda	11.12 (78)
1997	Kalamunda	18.17 (125)	Kingsley	6.13 (49)

Note: Known as Sunday Amateur Football League (SAFL) from 1994 to 1996 and Sunday Football League (SFL) Division 2 in 1997

=== Reserves grades ===
==== SFL Division 1 - Reserves ====
Year	Premiers	Score	Runners up	Score
1984	Canning	22.8 (140)	Kenwick	6.7 (43)
1985	Osborne Park	10.8 (68)	Willetton	7.14 (56)
1986	Maddington	21.11 (137)	Osborne Park	15.9 (99)
1987	Maddington	16.14 (110)	Applecross	10.8 (68)
1988	Kelmscott	16.13 (109)	Maddington	10.14 (74)
1989	Osborne Park	17.15 (117)	Gosnells	12.13 (85)
1990	Armadale	10.14 (74)	Osborne Park	9.10 (64)
1991	Wanneroo	12.5 (77)	Osborne Park	8.14 (62)
1992	Kelmscott	9.3 (57)	Osborne Park	7.12 (54)
1993	Osborne Park	14.14 (98)	Applecross	9.18 (72)
1994	Willetton	14.8 (92)	Osborne Park	9.8 (62)
1995	Willetton	16.16 (112)	Wanneroo	9.7 (61)
1996	Kenwick	9.7 (61)	Kelmscott	8.10 (58)
1997	Wanneroo	11.7 (73)	Armadale	10.6 (66)
1998	Wanneroo	10.7 (67)	Thornlie	4.12 (36)
1999	Thornlie	10.8 (68)	Gosnells	10.5 (65)
2000	Kelmscott	11.5 (71)	Maddington	5.10 (40)
2001	Thornlie	9.10 (64)	Maddington	5.12 (42)
2002	Maddington	9.16 (70)	Thornlie	5.13 (43)
2003	Thornlie	20.11 (131)	Kenwick	5.8 (38)
2004	Thornlie	9.4 (58)	Maddington	6.8 (44)
2005	Maddington	18.7 (115)	Thornlie	2.7 (19)
2006	Canning	11.6 (72)	Thornlie	7.5 (47)
2007	Maddington	8.7 (55)	Thornlie	7.8 (50)
2008	Maddington	9.5 (59)	Thornlie	8.5 (53)

==== Metropolitan Football League - Reserves ====
Year	Premiers	Score	Runners up	Score
1988	Kwinana	11.16 (82)	Cockburn	8.6 (54)
1989	Kwinana	18.17 (125)	Fremantle	9.4 (58)
1990	Kwinana	15.10 (100)	Midland	11.8 (74)
1991	Mosman Park	13.12 (90)	North Fremantle	3.6 (24)

==== Sunday Amateurs Football League / SFL Division 2 - Reserves ====
Year	Premiers	Score	Runners up	Score
1994	Belmont	12.17 (89)	Cockburn	9.9 (63)
1995	Midland	8.15 (63)	Belmont	8.10 (58)
1996	Belmont	17.20 (122)	Mosman Park	6.1 (37)
1997	Kalamunda	19.13 (127)	Kingsley	6.13 (49)

=== Lower grades ===
==== SFL Saturday Amateurs Division / SFL Division 3 ====
Year	Premiers	Score	Runners up	Score
1985	Osborne Park Red	12.11 (83)	Willetton	10.5 (65)
1986	Wanneroo	9.9 (63)	Osborne Park Red	9.6 (60)
1987	Osborne Park	15.17 (107)	Maddington	7.2 (44)
1988	Wanneroo	15.4 (94)	Osborne Park	4.10 (34)
1989	Maddington	13.13 (91)	Osborne Park	6.6 (42)
1990	Maddington	7.10 (52)	Willetton	6.15 (51)
1991	Osborne Park	15.11 (101)	Gosnells	7.7 (49)
1992	Kelmscott	11.14 (80)	Roleytone	5.8 (38)
1993	Armadale	11.9 (75)	Kelmscott	6.6 (42)
1994	Thornlie	12.4 (76); 8.8 (56)	Roleytone	11.10 (76); 5.5 (35)
1995	Gosnells	16.11 (107)	Kenwick	12.4 (76)
1996	Gosnells	8.9 (57)	Kenwick	7.5 (47)
1997	Kenwick	12.12 (84)	Kelmscott	10.6 (66)
1998	Kenwick	11.7 (73)	Thornlie	3.9 (27)
1999	Kenwick	16.14 (110)	Roleytone	8.4 (52)
2000	Kenwick	8.7 (55)	Roleytone	7.10 (52)
2001	Roleystone	14.13 (97)	Kenwick	7.10 (52)
2002	Roleystone	13.7 (85)	Sister Kates	8.10 (58)
2003	Kenwick	10.12 (72)	Koongamia	9.8 (62)
2004	Magpies	14.10 (94)	Kenwick	7.4 (46)
2005	Kenwick	10.15 (75)	Magpies	8.7 (55)
2006	Mustangs	16.13 (109)	Kenwick	12.10 (82)
2007	Forrestdale	10.6 (66)	Innaloo	7.13 (55)
2008	Kenwick	20.14 (134)	Roleystone	9.9 (63)

Note: Known as SFL Saturday Amateurs Division from 1985 to 1993, SFL Division 3 from 1994 to 1997, SFL Saturday Amateurs Division from 1998 to 2003 and WAFA from 2004 to 2008

=== Colts grades ===
==== SFL Division 1 - Colts ====
Year	Premiers	Score	Runners up	Score
1984	Kenwick	11.7 (73)	Fremantle	7.10 (52)
1985	Willetton	9.11 (65)	Wanneroo	6.8 (44)
1986	Thornlie	18.16 (124)	Willetton	8.7 (55)
1987	Willetton	10.9 (69)	Gosnells	7.9 (51)
1988	Applecross	17.8 (110)	Gosnells	13.9 (87)
1989	Applecross	9.19 (73)	Gosnells	8.7 (55)
1990	Gosnells	17.7 (109)	Armadale	6.14 (50)
1991	Kenwick	11.6 (72)	Kelmscott	8.10 (58)
1992	Willetton	8.14 (62)	Canning	5.9 (39)
1993	Willetton	8.9 (57)	Osborne Park	8.6 (54)
1994	Osborne Park	8.13 (61)	Kenwick	7.5 (47)
1995	Willetton	11.17 (83)	Kenwick	6.6 (42)
1996	Wanneroo	11.12 (78)	Kelmscott	3.5 (23)
1997	Kenwick	13.7 (85)	Maddington	9.4 (58)
1998	Kelmscott	7.6 (48)	Kenwick	6.8 (44)
1999	Kenwick	8.12 (60)	Kelmscott	8.10 (58)
2000	Wanneroo	16.3 (99)	Kenwick	10.12 (72)
2001	Kenwick	11.14 (80)	Wanneroo	4.6 (30)
2002	Kenwick	9.12 (66)	Thornlie	5.4 (34)
2003	Gosnells	11.5 (71)	Swan Valley	6.3 (39)
2004	Kenwick	13.9 (87)	Gosnells	8.4 (52)
2005	Armadale	12.10 (82)	Maddington	4.9 (33)
2006	Wanneroo-Kingsway	8.14 (62)	Thornlie	7.7 (49)
2007	Thornlie	15.7 (97)	Gosnells	10.4 (64)
2008	Thornlie	12.15 (87)	Gosnells	5.8 (38)

==== Metropolitan Football League - Colts ====
Year	Premiers	Score	Runners up	Score
1988	Midland	17.10 (112)	Kwinana	9.1 (55)
1989	Mundijong Centrals	14.9 (93)	Fremantle	11.8 (74)
1990	Mosman Park	11.9 (75)	Mundijong Centrals	5.9 (39)
1991	Mundijong Centrals	5.7 (37)	Manning	5.3 (33)

==== Sunday Amateurs Football League / SFL Division 2 - Colts ====
Year	Premiers	Score	Runners up	Score
1994	Belmont	14.7 (91)	Midland	5.6 (36)
1995	North Fremantle	13.5 (83)	Belmont	11.7 (73)
1996	Belmont	14.12 (96)	Kalamunda	9.10 (64)

== Premierships from previous leagues ==
=== South Suburban Football Association (SSFA) ===
Year	Premiers	Year	Premiers	Year	Premiers	Year	Premiers
1910	Mundijong	1925	Queens Park	1938	Canning	1950	Gosnells
1911	Queens Park	1926	Armadale	1939	Kelmscott	1951	Canning
1912	Kelmscott	1927	Armadale	1940	Armadale	1952	Maddington
1913	Queens Park	1928	Canning	1941	Canning	1953	Maddington
1914	Armadale	1929	Canning		Recess 1942-1943	1954	Gosnells
1915	Queens Park		Recess 1930-1932	1944	Armadale	1955	Canning
	Recess 1916-1920	1933	Canning	1945	Canning	1956	Canning
1921	Gosnells	1934	Armadale	1946	Maddington	1957	Gosnells
1922	Gosnells	1935	Armadale	1947	Canning	1958	Canning
1923	Armadale	1936	Armadale	1948	Canning	1959	Maddington
1924	Queens Park	1937	Armadale	1949	Canning	1960	Maddington

=== South Suburban Murray Football League (SSMFL) ===
Year	Premiers	Year	Premiers	Year	Premiers	Year	Premiers
1961	Canning	1967	Victoria Park	1973	Gosnells	1979	Kelmscott
1962	Kelmscott	1968	Victoria Park	1974	Maddington	1980	Canning
1963	Gosnells	1969	Belmont-Victoria Park	1975	Maddington	1981	Gosnells
1964	Gosnells	1970	Gosnells	1976	Maddington	1982	Rockingham
1965	Canning	1971	Maddington	1977	Gosnells	1983	Kenwick
1966	Maddington	1972	Mandurah	1978	Gosnells		

== Ladders ==
=== 2007 ladder ===
Sunday	Wins	Byes	Losses	Draws	For	Against	%	Pts	Final	Team	G	B	Pts	Team	G	B	Pts
Maddington	11	0	5	0	1539	934	164.78%	44	1st semi	Gosnells	14	11	95	Thornlie	12	10	82
Kenwick	11	0	5	0	1368	1061	128.93%	44	2nd semi	Kenwick	16	11	107	Maddington	15	6	96
Thornlie	10	0	5	1	1397	1068	130.81%	42	Preliminary	Maddington	11	16	82	Gosnells	11	6	72
Gosnells	10	0	5	1	1389	1091	127.31%	42	Grand	Maddington	14	12	96	Kenwick	5	13	43
Armadale	9	0	6	1	1528	1173	130.26%	38									
Tigers	3	0	13	0	1085	1391	78.00%	12									
Kelmscott	0	0	15	1	600	2188	27.42%	2									

=== 2008 ladder ===
Sunday	Wins	Byes	Losses	Draws	For	Against	%	Pts	Final	Team	G	B	Pts	Team	G	B	Pts
Gosnells	14	0	2	0	1931	1291	149.57%	56	1st semi	Kenwick	16	16	112	Thornlie	9	10	64
Maddington	13	0	3	0	1617	1104	146.47%	52	2nd semi	Gosnells	14	10	94	Maddington	12	10	82
Kenwick	12	0	4	0	1489	1015	146.70%	48	Preliminary	Kenwick	10	13	73	Maddington	8	12	60
Thornlie	7	0	8	1	1495	1480	101.01%	30	Grand	Gosnells	14	16	100	Kenwick	8	14	62
Kelmscott	6	0	10	0	1214	1785	68.01%	24									
Armadale	3	0	13	0	1251	1510	82.85%	12									
Tigers	0	0	15	1	1022	1834	55.73%	2									
