= Trelawny (surname) =

Trelawny or Trelawney is a habitational surname that originated in Cornwall. The family are said to have descended from Haemlin, who held several manors from Robert, Count of Mortain, according to the Domesday Book.

== People ==
- Trelawny baronets
- Charles Trelawny (disambiguation), several people:
  - Charles Trelawny (died 1731), soldier and MP for East Looe and Plymouth
  - Charles Trelawny (of Coldrenick) (fl. 1740s), MP for Liskeard
  - Charles Trelawny Brereton, born Charles Trelawny (died 1820), MP for Mitchell
- Edward Trelawney, Dean of Exeter between 1717 and 1726
- Edward Trelawny (colonial administrator) (1699–1754), British governor of Jamaica
- Edward John Trelawny (1792–1881), biographer and novelist, friend of Byron and Shelley
- Harry Trelawny (disambiguation), several people:
  - Sir Harry Trelawny, 5th Baronet (1687–1762), British officer
  - Harry Trelawny (1726–1800), British general and Coldstream Guards officer, nephew of the 5th Baronet
  - Sir Harry Trelawny, 7th Baronet (1756–1834), Protestant preacher and convert to Roman Catholicism, nephew of the general; see Hele's School
- Henry Trelawny (c. 1658 – 1702), British Army officer
- John Trelawny (disambiguation), several people:
  - John Trelawny I (fl. 1397), MP for Bodmin (UK Parliament constituency) in 1397, father of John Trelawny II
  - John Trelawny II (fl. 1413–1421), MP for Cornwall (UK Parliament constituency) 1413–1421, son of John Trelawny I
  - John Trelawny III (fl. 1421–1449), MP for Liskeard (UK Parliament constituency) 1421
  - John Trelawny (died 1563), Member of Parliament (MP) for Liskeard
  - John Trelawny (died 1568), his son, High Sheriff of Cornwall
  - Sir John Trelawny, 1st Baronet (1592–1664), Royalist before and during the English Civil War
  - John Trelawny (died 1680), MP for West Looe
  - John Trelawny (died 1682), MP for West Looe (UK Parliament constituency)
  - John Trelawny (1633–1706), MP for Plymouth (UK Parliament constituency)
  - Sir John Trelawny, 4th Baronet (1691–1756), MP for East Looe, West Looe and Liskeard
  - Sir John Salusbury-Trelawny, 9th Baronet (1816–1885), MP for Tavistock and Eastern Cornwall
- Jonathan Trelawny (disambiguation), several people:
  - Sir Jonathan Trelawny (High Sheriff of Cornwall), Member of Parliament for Liskeard and Cornwall
  - Sir Jonathan Trelawny, 2nd Baronet (c. 1623 – 1681), his grandson, Member of Parliament for East Looe, Cornwall and Liskeard
  - Jonathan Trelawny (1648-1705), of Plymouth, MP for West Looe (UK Parliament constituency) 1677–1685 and 1690–1695
  - Sir Jonathan Trelawny, 3rd Baronet (1650–1721), Bishop of Bristol, Exeter and Winchester
- Petroc Trelawny (born 1971), British radio presenter
- Robert Trelawney (1598–1643), English merchant, politician and colonist
- Samuel Trelawny (1630–1666), English lawyer and politician
- Sir William Trelawny, 6th Baronet (c. 1722 – 1772), British governor of Jamaica

== Fictional characters ==
- Sybill Trelawney, a character in the Harry Potter series by J. K. Rowling
- Squire Trelawney, a character in Treasure Island by Robert Louis Stevenson
- Jill Trelawney, an ambiguous villain in She Was a Lady, part of the Simon Templar series by Leslie Charteris
- Doctor Trelawney, the eccentric English naturalist and sometime surgeon in Il Visconte Dimezzato by Italo Calvino
- Mr. Trelawney Hope, a character in the Sherlock Holmes story The Adventure of the Second Stain by Arthur Conan Doyle
- Petroc Trelawney, a pet rock in the Septimus Heap series by Angie Sage
- Sean Trelawney, a character in the 1998 TV drama series The Net
- Abel and Margaret Trelawney, characters in Bram Stoker's Gothic horror novel The Jewel of Seven Stars
- Dr. Trelawney, the occultist in the A Dance to the Music of Time series by Anthony Powell
- Josiah Trelawny, a character in Red Dead Redemption II

== See also ==
- Trelawny (disambiguation)
