= GWR 3252 Class =

British steam locomotive class (1895–1951)

GWR 3252 Duke class
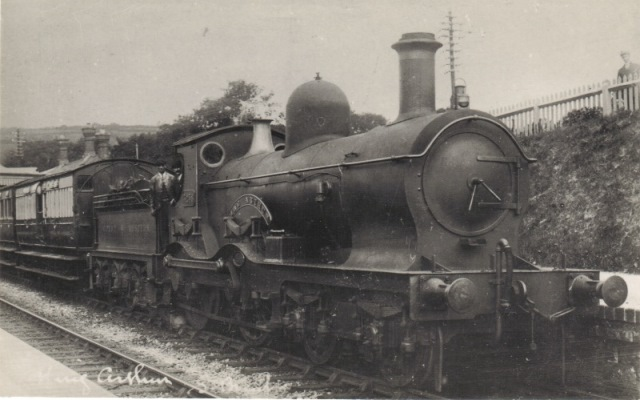
- 3258 King Arthur c. 1910
Type and origin
- Power type: Steam
- Designer: William Dean
- Builder: GWR Swindon Works
- Order number: Lots 97, 101, 102, 105, 113
- Serial number: 1431–1432, 1493–1510, 1531–1550, 1682–1701
- Build date: 1895–1899
- Total produced: 60
Specifications
- Configuration
  - Whyte: 4-4-0
  - UIC: 2′B n2
- Gauge: 4 ft 8 1/2 in (1,435 mm) standard gauge
- Leading dia.: 3 ft 8 in (1.118 m)
- Driver dia.: 5 ft 8 in (1.727 m)
- Axle load: 15 long tons 7 cwt (34,400 lb or 15.6 t) (15.6 t; 17.2 short tons) full
- Loco weight: 46 long tons 0 cwt (103,000 lb or 46.7 t) (46.7 t; 51.5 short tons) full
- Tender weight: 24 long tons 0 cwt (53,800 lb or 24.4 t) (24.4 t; 26.9 short tons) full
- Total weight: 70 long tons 0 cwt (156,800 lb or 71.1 t) (71.1 t; 78.4 short tons) full
- Fuel type: Coal
- Boiler: GWR Duke
- Boiler pressure: 160 lbf/in^{2} (1.1 MPa); 180 lbf/in^{2} (1.2 MPa) after refit
- Heating surface
  - Firebox: 115.27 sq ft (10.709 m^{2})
  - Tubes: 1,285.58 sq ft (119.434 m^{2})
- Cylinders: Two, inside
- Cylinder size: 18 in × 26 in (457 mm × 660 mm)
- Valve gear: Stephenson
- Train brakes: Vacuum
Career
- Operators: GWR » BR
- Withdrawn: 1929–1951
- Disposition: 20 rebuilt to Bulldogs, 30 rebuilt to Dukedogs, remainder scrapped

The Great Western Railway 3252 or Duke Class were 4-4-0 steam locomotives with outside frames and parallel domed boilers. They were built in five batches between 1895 and 1899 for express passenger train work in Devon and Cornwall. William Dean was their designer, possibly with the collaboration of his assistant, George Jackson Churchward. Four prototype 4-4-0s, of the Armstrong Class, had already been built in 1894.

== Design ==
=== Frames and wheels ===
The outside frames of the Dukes were curved upwards over each pair of driving wheels. Inner and outer frames were 3/4 in (19 mm) thick. The first 40 members of the class were fitted with Mansell pattern bogie wheels with wooden centres. The first 25 tenders built also had Mansell pattern wheels, and a shorter than normal wheelbase of 11 ft (3.35 m) so that the locomotives would fit on the smaller turntables then in use west of Newton Abbot. The engine bogie was of a centre-less type designed by Dean.

=== Boilers ===
The majority of the class were fitted with round-topped fireboxes of the same diameter as the boiler. The last four were fitted with Belpaire fireboxes, raised a few inches above the boilers. Eighteen of the Duke class were later rebuilt with domeless tapered boilers and Belpaire fireboxes between October 1906 and January 1909. They were reclassified as members of the Bulldog Class. A further Duke, no. 3273 Armorel, had been fitted with a parallel domeless boiler in February 1902, converting it to a Camel Class locomotive. It was fitted with a Bulldog-type boiler in October 1910. By December 1923 all remaining Dukes had been fitted with flush-topped Belpaire fireboxes and domed boilers pressed to 180 lbf/in^{2} (1.2 MPa). Duke no. 3258, King Arthur, built August 1895, was fitted with a superheater in December 1896. The rest of the class, with the exception of two locomotives, were fitted with superheaters between August 1911 and September 1946. The class had distinctive long smokeboxes, extended to hold a diaphragm plate and net for spark prevention.

=== Cylinders and valves ===
Slide valves were fitted underneath the cylinders, and were driven directly by eccentrics on the leading driving axle through Stephenson valve gear. This position had the advantage that, when the regulator was closed and steam pressure shut off, the valves would drop away from the steam ports, thus reducing wear on the valves and port faces. Dean's earlier designs had used slide valves mounted vertically between the cylinders; the new position allowed an increase in cylinder diameter from 17 in (432 mm) to 20 in (508 mm) in the Armstrong Class. The Dukes had 18 in (457 mm) diameter cylinders, possibly due to permanent way weight restrictions and a reduced supply of steam from the Dukes' smaller boilers.

Table of orders and numbers
Year	Quantity	Lot No.	Works No.	Locomotive numbers	Notes
1895	2	97	1431–1432	3252–3253	
1895	8	101	1493–1500	3254–3261	
1896	10	102	1501–1510	3262–3271	
1896–97	20	105	1531–1550	3272–3291	
1898–99	20	113	1682–1701	3312–3331	

== Renumbering ==
The Dukes were subject to the 1912 renumbering of GWR 4-4-0 locomotives. Those Dukes rebuilt as Bulldogs were renumbered as members of that class in the series 3300–3455. The remaining Dukes were renumbered consecutively as 3252–3291, this block of numbers having previously been allocated to the first batch of Duke Class locomotives.

== Rebuilding ==
By the 1930s many of the Duke class were becoming uneconomical to repair, particularly with regard to the curved outside frames, which were weaker than the later straight-topped version. A number of the class had been transferred to the ex-Cambrian Railways main line, where permanent way restrictions debarred the use of heavier locomotives.

In December 1929, no. 3265, Tre Pol and Pen, was withdrawn, and the cylinders and motion, together with a spare Duke boiler and smokebox, were fitted to the straight-topped frames and cab of Bulldog no. 3365 Charles Grey Mott. The rebuilt locomotive retained the name and number of the Duke. The reduction in axle weight, as compared to the Bulldogs, allowed for working over the Cambrian section.

From 1936 a further twenty-nine of the Dukes were withdrawn and replaced by Bulldogs fitted with Duke boilers and motion, reclassified as Earl Class locomotives. The onset of World War II brought a halt to the program, the last replacement being in November 1939, leaving ten Dukes to pass into British Railways ownership. These were scrapped between June 1949 and July 1951, the last survivor being No. 9089, formerly no. 3289 St Austell of July 1899.

== In fiction ==
The fate of the Dukes are mentioned by Duck the Great Western Engine in the Reverend Wilbert Awdry's children's book Very Old Engines.

== Summary table ==
Numbers			Names	
First	Second	Third	First	Second
3252	3252	Earl 3214	Duke of Cornwall	
3253	Bulldog 3300		Pendennis Castle	
3254	3253	Earl 3223	Boscawen	
3255	3254	9054	Cornubia	
3256	3255	Earl 3205	Excalibur	
3257	3256	Earl 3228	Guinevere	
3258	3257	Earl 3213	King Arthur	Denamed in 1927
3259	3258	Earl 3217	Lizard	The Lizard
3260	3259	Earl 3221	Merlin	
3261	3260	Earl 3219	Mount Edgcumbe	
3262	Bulldog 3301		Powderham	
3263	Bulldog 3302		Sir Lancelot	
3264	Bulldog 3303		St. Anthony	
3265	3261	Earl 3212	St. Germans	
3266	3262	Earl 3215	St. Ives	
3267	3263	Earl 3201	St. Michael	
3268	Bulldog 3304		Tamar	River Tamar
3269	Bulldog 3305		Tintagel	
3270	3264	9064	Trevithick	
3271	3265	Earl 3265	Tre Pol and Pen	
3272	3266	Earl 3218	Amyas	
3273	Bulldog 3306		Armorel	
3274	3267	Earl 3206	Cornishman	
3275	3268	Earl 3225	Chough	
3276	3269	Earl 3210	Dartmoor	
3277	3270	Earl 3226	Earl of Devon	Denamed in 1930
3278	3271	Earl 3204	Eddystone	
3279	Bulldog 3307		Exmoor	
3280	Bulldog 3308		Falmouth	
3281	3272	9072	Fowey	Denamed in 1930
3282	Bulldog 3309		Maristowe	
3283	3273	9073	Mount's Bay	
3284	3274	Earl 3207	Newquay	Denamed in 1930
3285	3275	Earl 3203	St. Erth	Denamed in 1930
3286	Bulldog 3310		St. Just	
3287	3276	9076	St. Agnes	Denamed in 1930
3288	3277	Earl 3209	Tresco	Isle of Tresco
3289	3278	Earl 3222	Trefusis	
3290	3279	Earl 3220	Torbay	Tor Bay
3291	3280	Earl 3227	Tregenna	Denamed in 1930
3312	Bulldog 3311		Bulldog	
3313	3281	Earl 3211	Cotswold	
3314	3282	Earl 3216	Chepstow Castle	Denamed in 1930
3315	3283	9083	Comet	
3316	Bulldog 3312		Guernsey	Isle of Guernsey
3317	3284	9084	Jersey	Isle of Jersey
3318	Bulldog 3313		Jupiter	
3319	3285	Earl 3208	Katerfelto	
3320	3286	Earl 3202	Meteor	
3321	3287	9087	Mercury	
3322	Bulldog 3314		Mersey	
3323	3288	Earl 3200	Mendip	
3324	Bulldog 3315		Quantock	
3325	Bulldog 3316		St. Columb	
3326	3289	9089	St Austell	Denamed in 1930
3327	Bulldog 3317		Somerset	
3328	3290	Earl 3224	Severn	
3329	3291	9091	Thames	
3330	Bulldog 3318		Vulcan	
3331	Bulldog 3319		Weymouth	
