= GWR 3200 Class =

British steam locomotive

GWR 3200 class
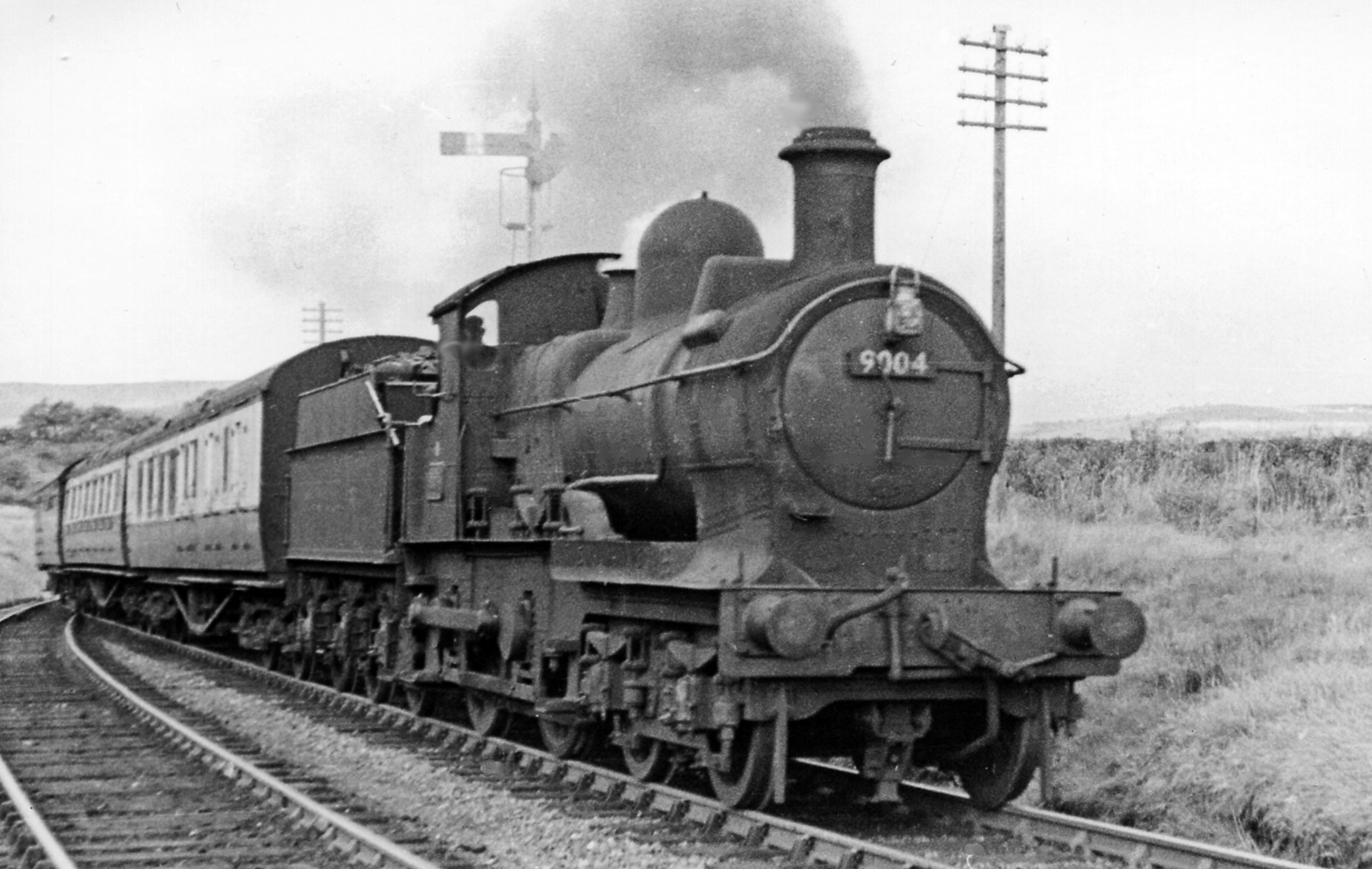
- 9004 on the Cambrian Coast line in 1953
Type and origin
- Power type: Steam
- Designer: Charles Collett (rebuild)
- Order number: Lots 315, 331
- Rebuilder: GWR Swindon Works
- Rebuild date: 1936–1939
- Number rebuilt: 30
Specifications
- Configuration
  - Whyte: 4-4-0
  - UIC: 2′B h2
- Gauge: 4 ft 8 1/2 in (1,435 mm) standard gauge
- Leading dia.: 3 ft 8 in (1.118 m)
- Driver dia.: 5 ft 8 in (1.727 m)
- Minimum curve: 6 chains (396 ft; 121 m) normal, 5 chains (330 ft; 101 m) slow
- Length: 56 ft 2 1/4 in (17.13 m)
- Width: 8 ft 9 1/2 in (2.680 m)
- Height: 12 ft 10 in (3.912 m)
- Axle load: 15 long tons 8 cwt (34,500 lb or 15.6 t) (17.2 short tons) full
- Adhesive weight: 30 long tons 8 cwt (68,100 lb or 30.9 t) (34.0 short tons) full
- Loco weight: 49 long tons 0 cwt (109,800 lb or 49.8 t) (54.9 short tons) full
- Tender weight: 40 long tons 0 cwt (89,600 lb or 40.6 t) (44.8 short tons) full
- Fuel type: Coal
- Fuel capacity: 6 long tons 0 cwt (13,400 lb or 6.1 t) full
- Water cap.: 3,500 imp gal (16,000 L; 4,200 US gal)
- Firebox
  - Grate area: 17.0 sq ft (1.58 m^{2})
- Boiler: GWR Duke
- Boiler pressure: 180 lbf/in^{2} (1.24 MPa)
- Heating surface
  - Firebox: 108.0 sq ft (10.03 m^{2})
  - Tubes: 1,001.0 sq ft (93.00 m^{2})
- Superheater
  - Heating area: 81.2 sq ft (7.54 m^{2})
- Cylinders: Two, inside
- Cylinder size: 18 in × 26 in (457 mm × 660 mm)
- Valve gear: Stephenson
- Valve type: Slide valves
Performance figures
- Tractive effort: 18,955 lbf (84.32 kN)
Career
- Operators: GWR » BR
- Power class: GWR: B, BR: 2P
- Numbers: 3265, 3200–3228; renumbered 9065, 9000–9028
- Nicknames: Dukedog
- Axle load class: Yellow
- Locale: Western Region
- Withdrawn: 1948–1960
- Preserved: 9017
- Disposition: One preserved, remainder scrapped

The Great Western Railway 3200 Class (or 'Earl' Class) was a design of 4-4-0 steam locomotive for passenger train work. The nickname for this class, almost universally used at the time these engines were in service, was Dukedog since the locomotives were composed of former Duke Class boilers on Bulldog Class frames. As such they were one of the last standard gauge steam locomotive classes to retain outside frames.

== Background ==
The GWR absorbed the Cambrian Railways in 1923, but, with the Cambrian main line being lightly built, permanent way restrictions debarred the use of heavier locomotives. This meant that only a few classes of GWR locomotive were allowed to run over it, including the Duke Class. However, by the 1930s the Duke class engines were past their estimated life, and in particular the frames were in poor condition. At the same time the heavier Bulldog Class was becoming redundant and being withdrawn, and later members of this class had an improved straight topped frame design.

== Construction ==
In December 1929, Duke No.3265 Tre Pol and Pen was withdrawn, and the cab and other above-frame fittings together with a spare Duke boiler and smokebox, were fitted to the straight-topped frames of Bulldog no. 3365 Charles Grey Mott. The rebuilt locomotive was given the name and number of the Duke. This resulted in an engine with stronger frames which could still be used on yellow weight restricted routes.

The conversion was a success and from 1936 twenty-nine "new" locomotives were constructed from the relevant components of withdrawn Dukes and Bulldogs. The classification of the rebuilds as "new" locomotives had advantages in the railway's accounts, and they were given new numbers in the 32xx series (3200–3228). A further eleven conversions were scheduled, but the onset of World War II brought a halt to the programme.

Table of orders and numbers
Year	Quantity	Lot No.	Locomotive numbers	Notes
1929	1	—	3265	renumbered 9065 in 1946
1936–38	20	315	3200–3219	renumbered 9000–9019 in 1946
1938–39	9	331	3220–3228	3229–3239 cancelled; renumbered 9020–9028 in 1946

== Naming ==
The prototype conversion retained its Duke number and name (3265 Tre Pol and Pen). The first nominally new locomotive was numbered 3201, and originally kept the name of the parent Duke. A decision was then taken to name the class after living Earls who had some connection with the GWR. Apparently, as a riposte to repeated requests from aristocratic GWR directors for engines to be named after them, the CME of Great Western, Charles Collett decided that these "new" engines, with their decidedly old-fashioned Victorian appearance, should be given the names of those directors. When the directors assembled at Paddington Station for the unveiling of the "new" class, the group were not impressed at Collett's joke. So, although the first batch of twenty were allocated Earl names, following the construction and naming of no. 3212 Earl of Eldon in May 1937, the nameplates were removed and the names given to nos. 5043–5062 of the express Castle class instead.

== Renumbering ==
In the 1946 renumbering all the surviving locomotives in the 32xx series, both Dukes and Dukedogs, were renumbered in the 90xx series, retaining the same last two digits. This was to free the 32xx numbers for new 2251 Class engines.

== Operations ==
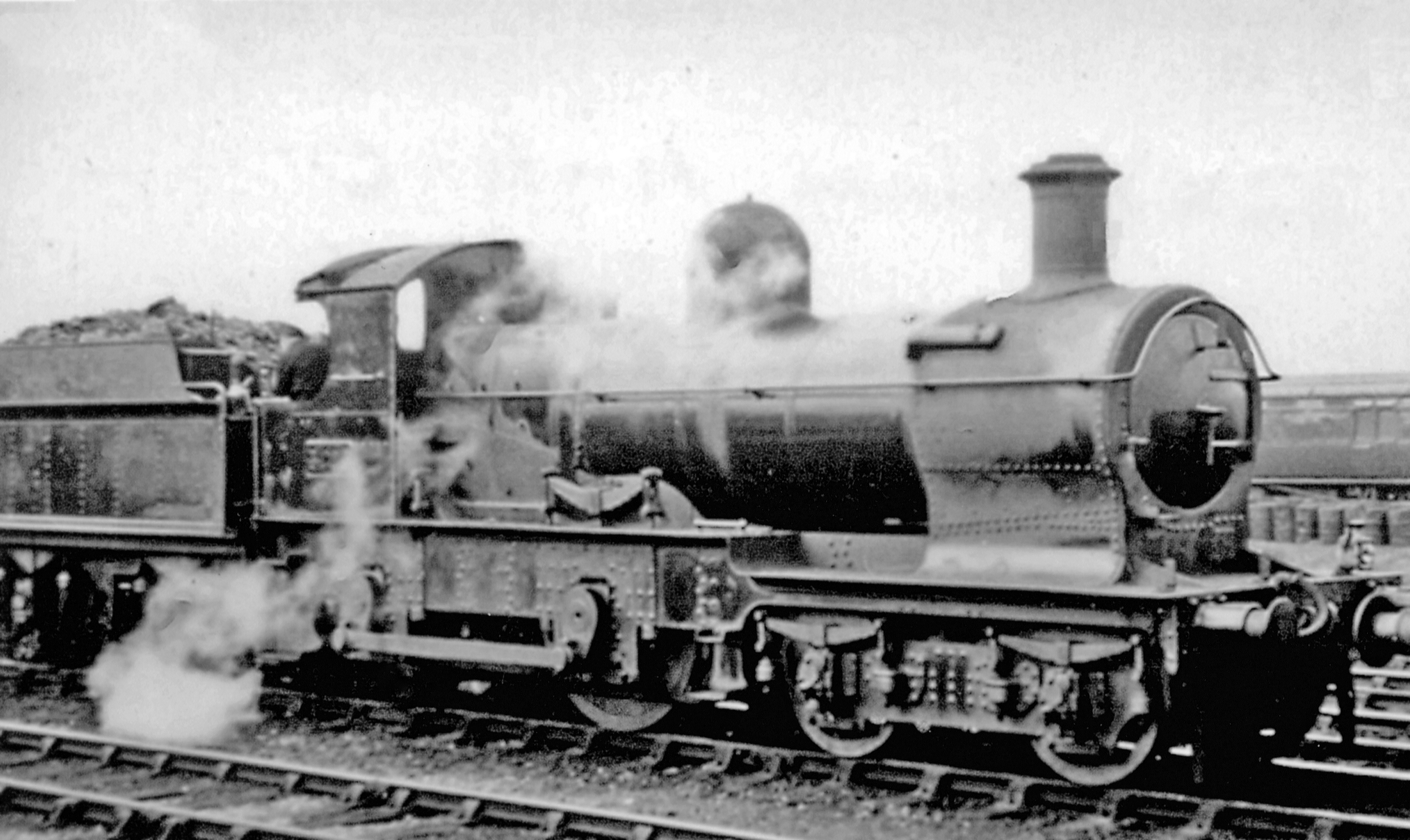
Dukedog 4-4-0 at Swindon, 1946

Mainly allocated to the Cambrian main line, it remained one of the few classes of locomotive that British Rail inherited that were light enough to be permitted on the wooden Barmouth Bridge (others were the GWR 2251 Class and the LMS Ivatt Class 2 2-6-0). As a result, they remained in regular use until the 1950s.

== Preservation: 9017 Earl of Berkeley ==
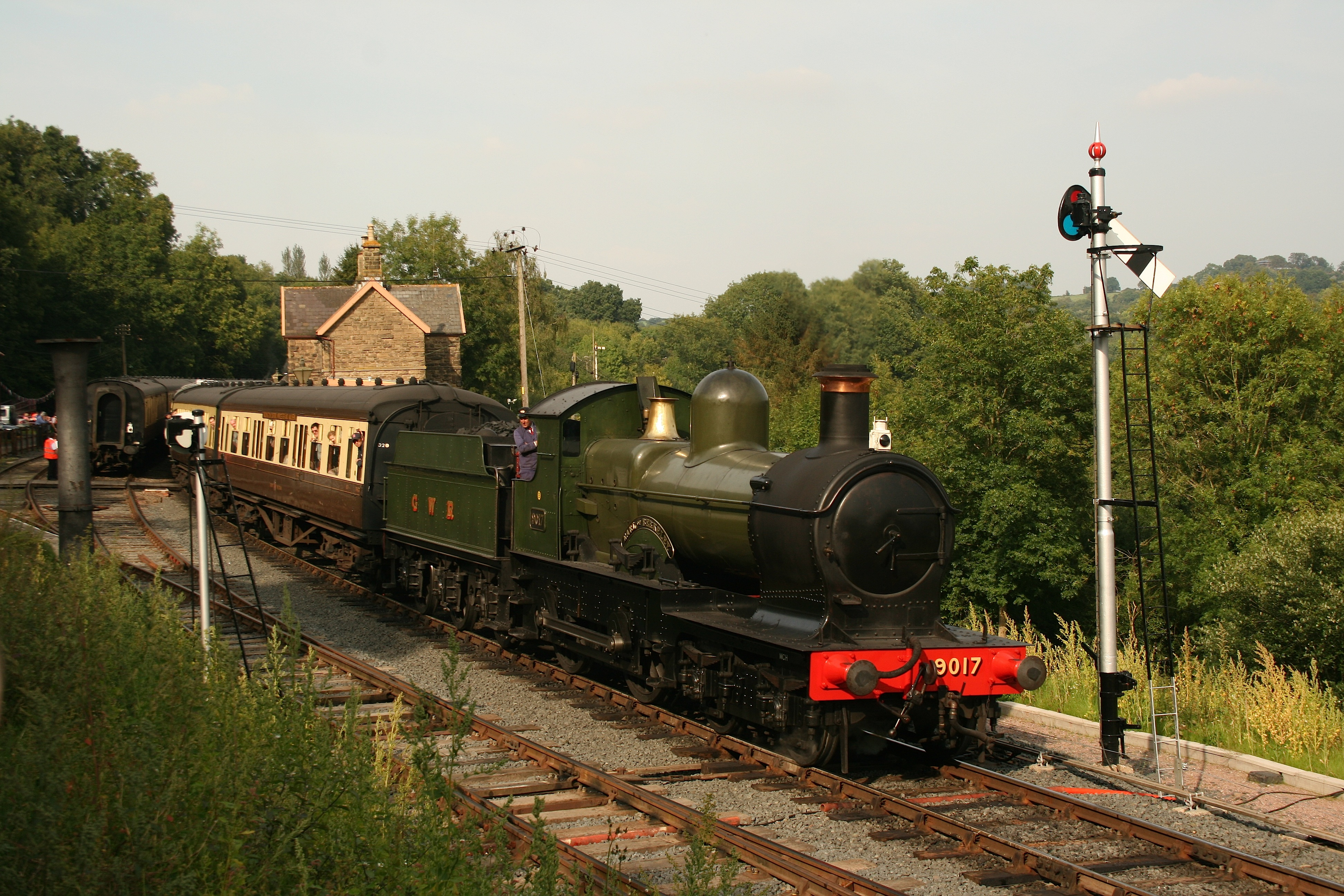
GWR 9017 in late GWR livery, departing from Highley on the Severn Valley Railway, 2008

One locomotive, 9017 Earl of Berkeley survives in preservation at the Bluebell Railway. The locomotive was built at Swindon Works in 1938, using frames from "Bulldog" No. 3425 (built 1906), and boiler and cab from "Duke" class No. 3282 (originally named "Chepstow Castle", built in 1895). Originally numbered 3217, it was renumbered post-WW2 as 9017. Mainly deployed on the Cambrian Line, the locomotive was withdrawn from service at Oswestry in October 1960.

Preserved privately directly from British Railways, with the Bluebell Line as the then only preserved standard-gauge line in the whole of the UK, it arrived there 15 February 1962. From September 1963 it carried the name plates from GWR 4073 Class No. 5060. It carried its post-WW2 9017 plates until the BR withdrawal of GWR 0-6-0 No.3217, when it was reunited with its original number plates in early 1965. After a period out of traffic from December 1973, its overhaul began in 1980, returning to traffic in 1982. After its last overhaul completed in November 2003, its private owner donated it to the Bluebell Railway, on condition that it remained mainly in service on the line. After a series of boiler and mechanical failures in June 2011, it was withdrawn from service. In early 2024 it was moved to the Vale of Rheidol Railway for a two-year loan period, to be displayed in their new museum, followed by a further two-year loan to the Severn Valley Railway in March 2026 for display in the Engine House museum.

== Numbering ==
NB: In the table below, names in parentheses were allocated but never actually carried in GWR/BR service.

Numbers	Rebuilt from	Name
3265 / 9065	3265 & 3365	Tre Pol and Pen
3200 / 9000	3288 & 3422	Earl of Mount Edgcumbe
3201 / 9001	3263 & 3412	Earl of Dunraven
3202 / 9002	3286 & 3416	Earl of Dudley
3203 / 9003	3275 & 3424	Earl Cawdor
3204 / 9004	3271 & 3439	Earl of Dartmouth
3205 / 9005	3255 & 3413	Earl of Devon
3206 / 9006	3267 & 3428	Earl of Plymouth
3207 / 9007	3274 & 3410	Earl of St. Germans
3208 / 9008	3285 & 3403	Earl Bathurst
3209 / 9009	3277 & 3392	Earl of Radnor
3210 / 9010	3269 & 3402	Earl Cairns
3211 / 9011	3281 & 3415	Earl of Ducie
3212 / 9012	3261 & 3405	Earl of Eldon
3213 / 9013	3257 & 3374	(Earl of Powis)
3214 / 9014	3252 & 3434	(Earl Waldegrave)
3215 / 9015	3262 & 3420	(Earl of Clancarty)
3216 / 9016	3282 & 3404	(Earl St Aldwyn)
3217 / 9017	3258 & 3425	(Earl of Berkeley)
3218 / 9018	3266 & 3380	(Earl of Birkenhead)
3219 / 9019	3260 & 3427	(Earl of Shaftesbury)
3220 / 9020	3279 & 3414	
3221 / 9021	3259 & 3411	
3222 / 9022	3278 & 3436	
3223 / 9023	3253 & 3423	
3224 / 9024	3290 & 3409	
3225 / 9025	3268 & 3437	
3226 / 9026	3270 & 3390	
3227 / 9027	3280 & 3433	
3228 / 9028	3256 & 3429	
