= General Trelawny =

General Trelawny may refer to:

- Charles Trelawny (1653–1731), British Army major general
- Harry Trelawny (1726–1800), British Army lieutenant general
- Henry Trelawny (c. 1658–1702), British Army brigadier general
