= David Watson (British Army officer) =

Scottish military surveyor and engineer

Major-General David Watson
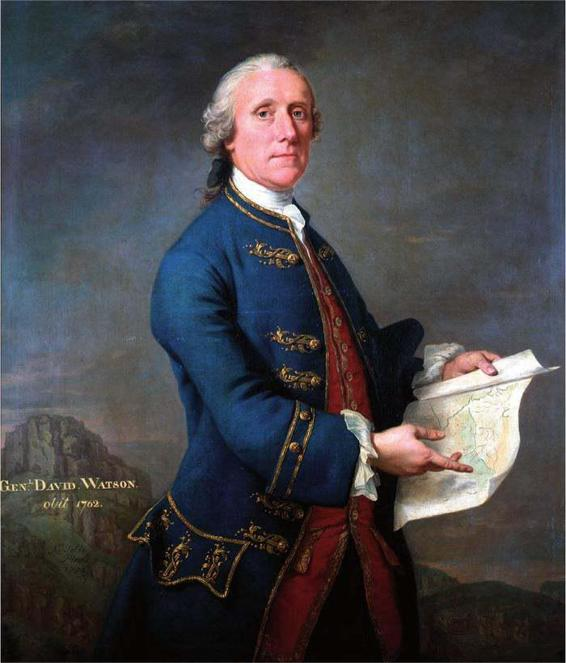
- Portrait by Andrea Soldi, 1762
- Born: 29 June 1704; Muirhouse, Scotland
- Died: 7 November 1761 (aged 57); London, England
- Military career
- Allegiance: Great Britain
- Branch: British Army: Royal Engineers
- Service years: 1725–1760
- Rank: Major-General
- Conflicts: War of the Austrian Succession; Battle of Dettingen; Battle of Fontenoy; Siege of Ostend; Jacobite Rising of 1745; First Siege of Carlisle; Second Siege of Carlisle; Battle of Falkirk Muir; Battle of Culloden; Seven Years' War; Battle of Minden

Major-General David Watson (1704–1761) of the Royal Engineers was a Scottish officer and military engineer in the British Army.

== Origins ==
David Watson, born 29 Jun 1704, was the son of Robert Watson of Muirhouse, a Scottish merchant and solicitor, and Mary Baird, daughter of Robert Baird of Saughtonhall. He was the youngest of 11 children. David 'grew up in the early decades of the Scottish Enlightenment among a family who were enthusiastic sponsors of its values'. His sister Elizabeth's husband, Robert Dundas, Lord Advocate and Lord President of the Court of Sessions, with whom he lived in Lanarkshire and who became his patron, procured for him a commission in the Army. He was appointed an ensign in Colonel Middleton's regiment, later the 25th Foot, on 10 July 1725. He was at Gibraltar in 1731, and on 22 June 1733 was promoted to be lieutenant in the 25th Foot, which was then under the command of John Leslie, 10th Earl of Rothes.

== War of the Austrian Succession ==
In the summer of 1742 Watson accompanied his regiment to Flanders, and passed the winter at Ghent. On account of his knowledge of fortification and field engineering, and of his skill as a draughtsman, he was given on 23 December the local warrant of engineer in ordinary, and attached to the ordnance train under Colonel Thomas Pattison. He took part in the Battle of Dettingen on 27 June 1743, and again wintered at Ghent.

On 10 March 1744 Watson was placed on the establishment of the engineers as a sub-engineer, and that year he lay with the ordnance train for the most part inactive at Ostend. He was actively employed in the Campaign of 1745, took part in the Battle of Fontenoy on 11 May, and was promoted on 21 May to be captain in the 21st Foot, the Earl of Panmure's regiment. He did good service at the Siege of Ostend, which capitulated to the French on 13 August. Under the terms of the capitulation he rejoined the Duke of Cumberland's army.

== Jacobite rising ==
Watson was recalled to England in the autumn to aid in crushing the Stuart rebellion. On 4 November he went north and was present at the siege and recapture on 29 December 1745 of Carlisle, and at the Battle of Falkirk on 17 January 1746. For his services he was promoted on the next day to be lieutenant-colonel in the army. He took part in the Battle of Culloden on 16 April 1746, and remained in the Highlands to design and superintend the erection of some barracks at Inversnaid, between Loch Katrine and Loch Lomond. He designed in April 1747 a new magazine for Edinburgh Castle. His designs for all these works later entered the collection of the British Museum. On 3 January 1748 Watson was promoted to be engineer-extraordinary on the establishment.

== Surveying ==
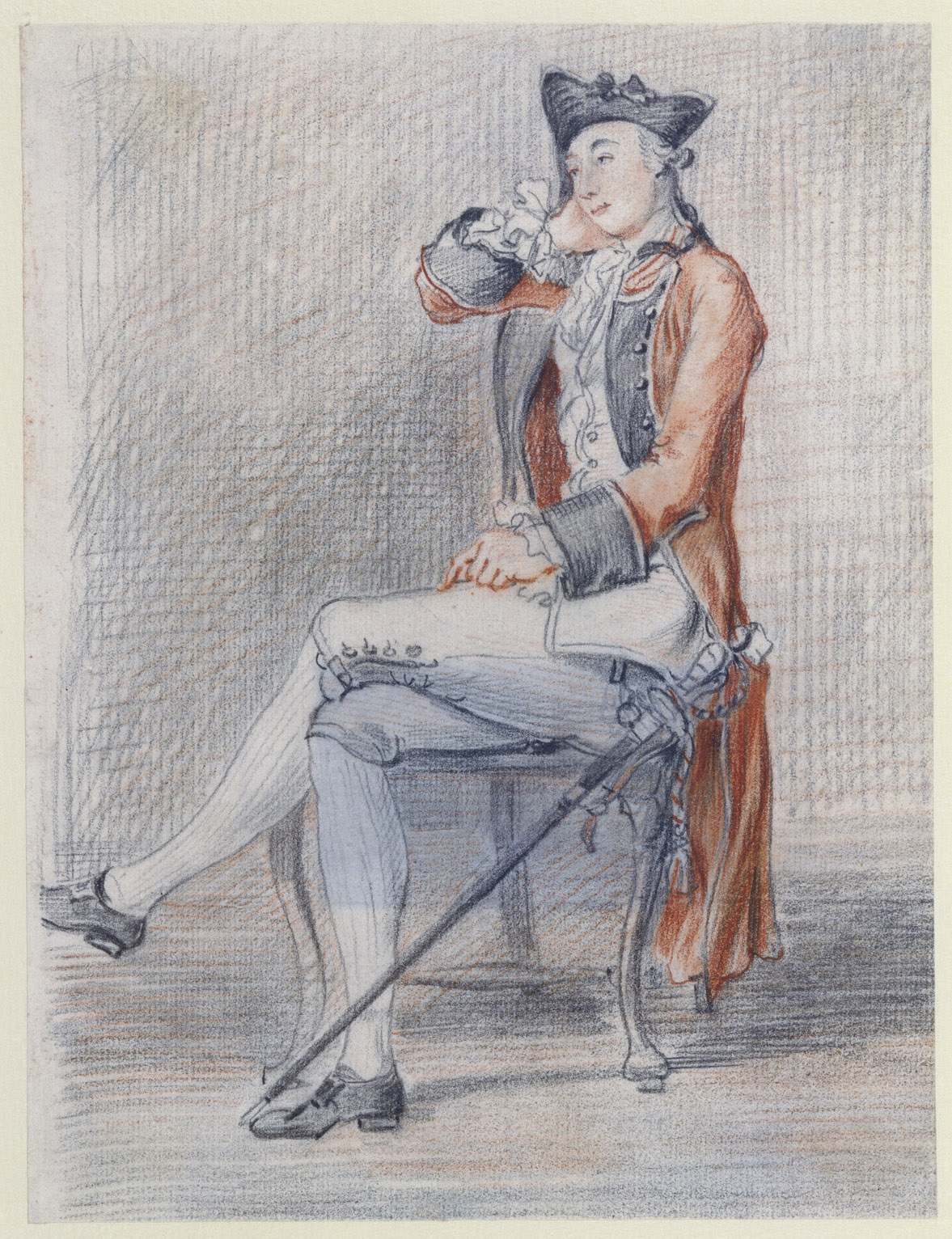
Paul Sandby: Col. David Watson (c. 1750)

In 1747 Watson submitted a scheme for a survey of North Britain. The advantage of such an undertaking was particularly evident at that time, and the King directed that it should be proceeded with at once. Watson was appointed superintendent, with the title of deputy-quartermaster-general in Scotland, and a brigade of engineers was sent to act under his orders. With the execution of this survey, or extended military reconnaissance, was combined an enlargement of Marshal Wade's plan of connecting the Highlands and Lowlands, and opening up the country by means of good roads. Watson laid out the directions of the different tracks, and paid special attention to the main roads. He formed a camp near Fort Augustus as a centre for the troops employed upon the works, who were despatched thence to outlying stations. He continued this work for several years, completing it with bridges, culverts, and channels; and the troops employed, proud of their labour in so important a public work, erected memorials by the wayside bearing records of the dates and names of the regiments employed.

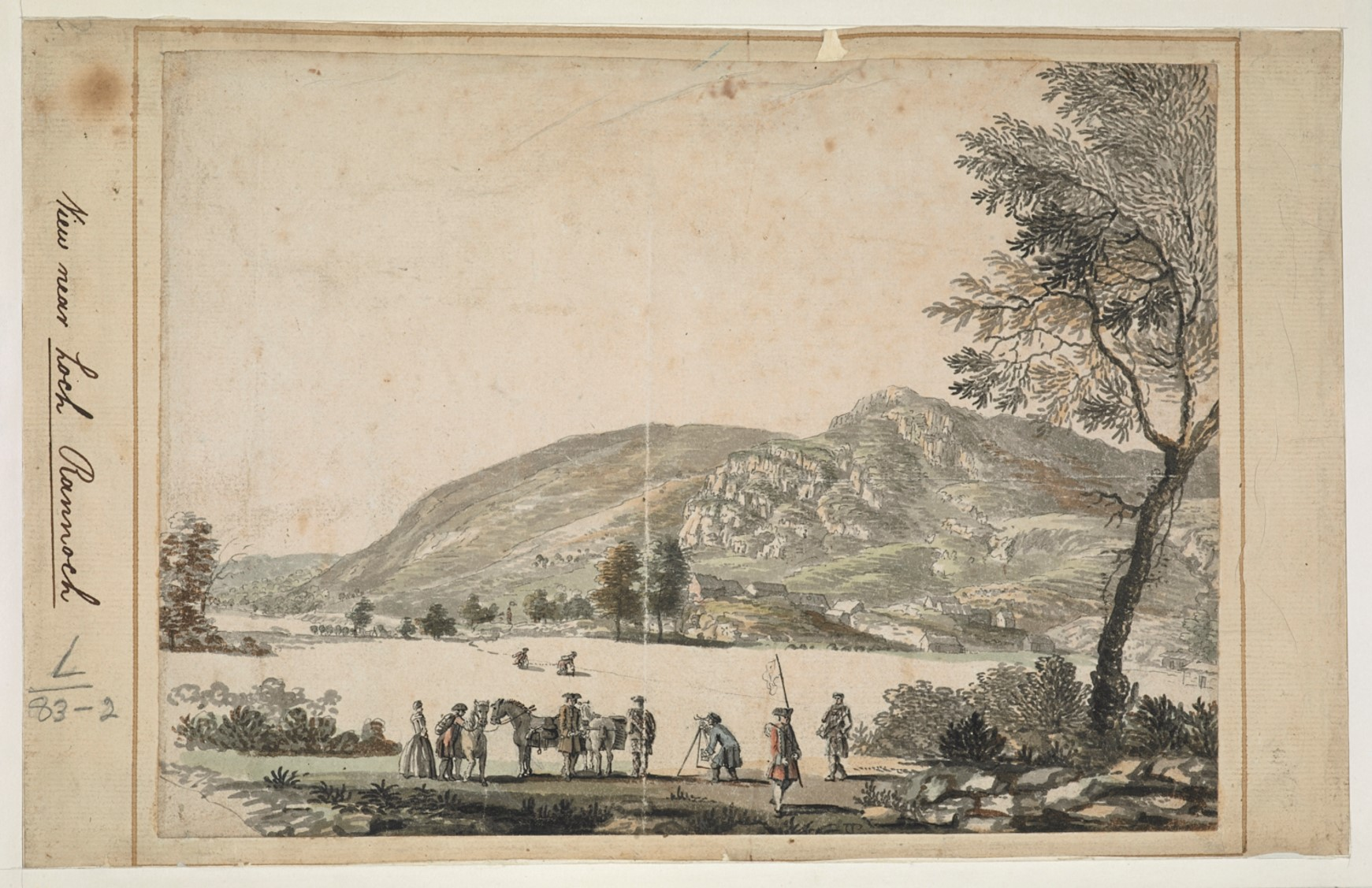
Paul Sandby: Surveying near Loch Rannoch (undated)

Watson was assisted, both in this work and the survey, by two very able young men, his nephew David Dundas and William Roy. Roy joined him in 1746, and Dundas six years later. Watson carried out in 1748, in addition to his other work, improvements to the defences of the castles of Braemar and Corgarff. Four plans by him of these castles (dated 25 April 1748) entered the War Office records. On 31 December 1752 Watson was promoted to be engineer in ordinary. In 1754 he completed his great survey; and the original protractions of the north part of it, in eighty-four rolls, and of the south part in ten rolls, with various copies of the survey to a reduced scale, entered the collection of the British Museum. There also are preserved several mercator projections of North Britain, on which maps are indicated the posts in the Highlands which were occupied or proposed for occupation by the regular troops. The revision and completion of the survey was contemplated in 1755, but prevented by the outbreak of war. The survey was eventually reduced by Watson and Roy, engraved in a single sheet, and published as 'The King's Map'.

An alarm of invasion caused the recall of Watson and his assistants to England to make military reconnaissances of those parts of the country most exposed to such attack. Watson made a reconnaissance of the country between Guildford and Canterbury in December 1755, and early in 1756 of the country between Dorchester and Salisbury, and also between Gloucester and Pembroke. In March 1756, on an address of the House of Commons, Watson designed works for the defence of Milford Haven. He was examined by a committee of the House of Commons, and his projects were recommended to be put in hand to allay public alarm. Nothing, however, was done, and some years later other proposals by General William Skinner were preferred. Watson's survey of Milford Haven, dated 3 March 1756, entered the collection of the King's Library.

On 23 May Watson was appointed quartermaster-general of the forces for Scotland, with the rank of colonel of foot. On 14 May 1757, when the Engineers were reorganised, he became a captain of the Royal Engineers.

== Seven Years' War ==
On 21 April 1758 Watson was given the colonelcy of the 63rd Foot, and was appointed quartermaster-general in the conjoint expedition, under the Duke of Marlborough, Lord Anson, and Admiral Howe, which sailed from Spithead for the French coasts on 1 June. He landed with the troops in Cancale Bay, near St. Malo, assisted on the following day in the destruction of shipping and magazines of naval stores in the suburbs, embarked again on the 11th Foot, and, after ineffective visits to Havre and Cherbourg, returned to Portsmouth.

Watson then joined the allied army on the Rhine under Prince Ferdinand of Brunswick. He was appointed quartermaster-general on the staff of Lord George Sackville, commanding the British contingent, and in that capacity took part in all the operations of the campaigns of 1758 and 1759 in which the British were engaged. On 31 July 1759 he reconnoitred the country between the allied camp and Minden Heath, extending his reconnaissance beyond the village of Halen. He distinguished himself at the Battle of Minden on 1 August, and on the following day was thanked in general orders for his bravery and able service. He was promoted to be major-general on 25 June 1759, but his promotion was not gazetted until 15 September following.

== Death and legacy ==
On 23 October 1760 Watson was transferred from the colonelcy of the 63rd Foot to that of the 38th Foot. He died in London on 7 November 1761, while holding the appointment of quartermaster-general to the forces, after a long illness; he was tended on his deathbed by his housekeeper, Sophia Wilson, whose devotion he mentioned in his will. He never married, but in his will provided for his bastard, David Watson, to be apprenticed when old enough.

== Likenesses ==
- Andrea Soldi, oils, 1756, private collection;
- Paul Sandby, chalk drawing, Windsor Castle;
- Andrea Soldi, oils, private collection.

== Sources ==
- Baigent, Elizabeth (2008). "Watson, David (1713?–1761), military surveyor and engineer". Oxford Dictionary of National Biography (online ed.). Oxford University Press. doi:10.1093/ref:odnb/28834. (Subscription, Wikipedia Library access or UK public library membership required.)
- Hewitt, Rachel (2010). Map of a Nation: A Biography of the Ordnance Survey. London: Granta Books.

Attribution:

- This article incorporates text from a publication now in the public domain: Vetch, Robert Hamilton (1899). "Watson, David (1713?-1761)". In Lee, Sidney (ed.). Dictionary of National Biography. Vol. 60. London: Smith, Elder & Co. pp. 4–5.
