= GWR 3300 Class =

Class of British 4-4-0 locomotives

GWR Bulldog class
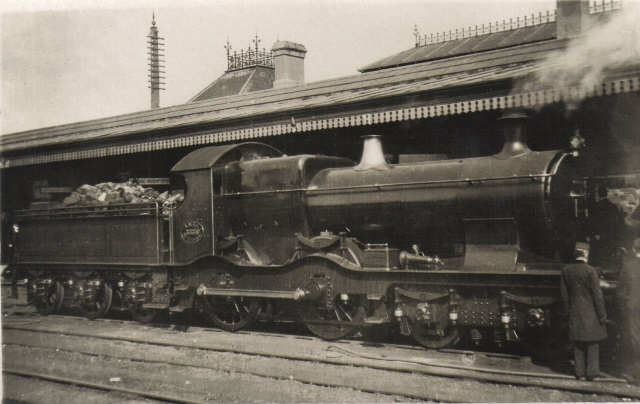
- 3338 Laira c. 1915
Type and origin
- Figures given are for 3341 class version
- Power type: Steam
- Designer: William Dean
- Builder: GWR Swindon Works
- Order number: Lots 118, 120, 124, 137, 142, 148, 162, 163, 177
- Build date: 1899–1910
- Total produced: 136 new + 20 rebuilt from Duke class
Specifications
- Configuration
  - Whyte: 4-4-0
  - UIC: 2′B h2
- Gauge: 4 ft 8 1/2 in (1,435 mm) standard gauge
- Leading dia.: 3 ft 8 in (1.118 m)
- Driver dia.: 5 ft 8 in (1.727 m)
- Length: 56 ft 2 1/4 in (17.126 m) over buffers
- Width: 8 ft 9 1/2 in (2.680 m)
- Height: 12 ft 4 1/2 in (3.772 m)
- Axle load: 17 long tons 12 cwt (39,400 lb or 17.9 t) full
- Adhesive weight: 34 long tons 8 cwt (77,100 lb or 35 t) full
- Loco weight: 51 long tons 16 cwt (116,000 lb or 52.6 t) full
- Tender weight: 36 long tons 15 cwt (82,300 lb or 37.3 t) full
- Total weight: 88 long tons 11 cwt (198,400 lb or 90 t) full
- Fuel type: Coal
- Water cap.: 3,000 imp gal (14,000 L; 3,600 US gal)
- Firebox
  - Grate area: 20.35 sq ft (1.891 m^{2})
- Boiler: GWR Standard No. 2; GWR Standard No. 3
- Boiler pressure: 200 lbf/in^{2} (1.4 MPa)
- Heating surface
  - Firebox: 121.80 sq ft (11.316 m^{2})
  - Tubes: 1,144.95 sq ft (106.369 m^{2})
- Superheater
  - Heating area: 82.20 sq ft (7.637 m^{2})
- Cylinders: Two, inside
- Cylinder size: 18 in × 26 in (457 mm × 660 mm)
- Valve gear: Stephenson
- Train brakes: Vacuum
Performance figures
- Tractive effort: 21,060 lbf (93.7 kN)
Career
- Operators: GWR » BR
- Power class: GWR: B
- Numbers: 3353–3372, 3413–3432, 3443–3472, 3701–3745 renumbered 3341–3455 in 1912
- Axle load class: GWR: Blue
- Withdrawn: 1929-1951

The Bulldog and Bird classes were double-framed inside cylinder 4-4-0 steam locomotives used for passenger services on the Great Western Railway. The Bird Class were a development of the Bulldogs with strengthened outside frames, of which a total of fifteen were built. A total of 121 Bulldogs were built new, with a further twenty rebuilt from Duke Class locomotives. Thirty Bulldogs were later rebuilt as Earl Class locomotives and renumbered 3265 (prototype conversion), 3200–3228.

== History ==
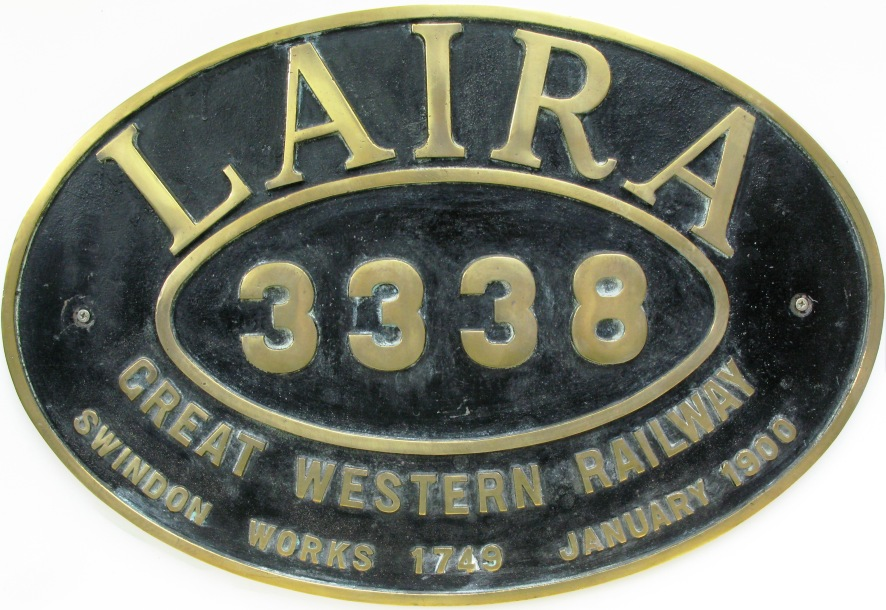
Original pre-1912 nameplate of 3338 Laira

No. 3312 Bulldog was built in October 1898, with curved outside frames, a domed parallel boiler with a raised Belpaire firebox and a wrapper-type smokebox. The boiler was a prototype for the parallel version of Churchward's Standard No. 2 boilers. Bulldog was originally classed as a variant of the Duke Class.

In October 1899 no. 3352 Camel appeared with the final form of the parallel No. 2 boiler, domeless, with a raised Belpaire firebox and a circular drumhead smokebox supported on a curved saddle. A further twenty locomotives, nos. 3332 to 3351, were built between November 1899 and March 1900. Between May and December 1900 a second batch of twenty Camels (as the class were initially known) were built with straight-topped outside frames. These were numbered 3353 to 3372. A third batch, 3413 to 3432 were built between December 1902 and May 1903; these were the last to be built with parallel boilers.

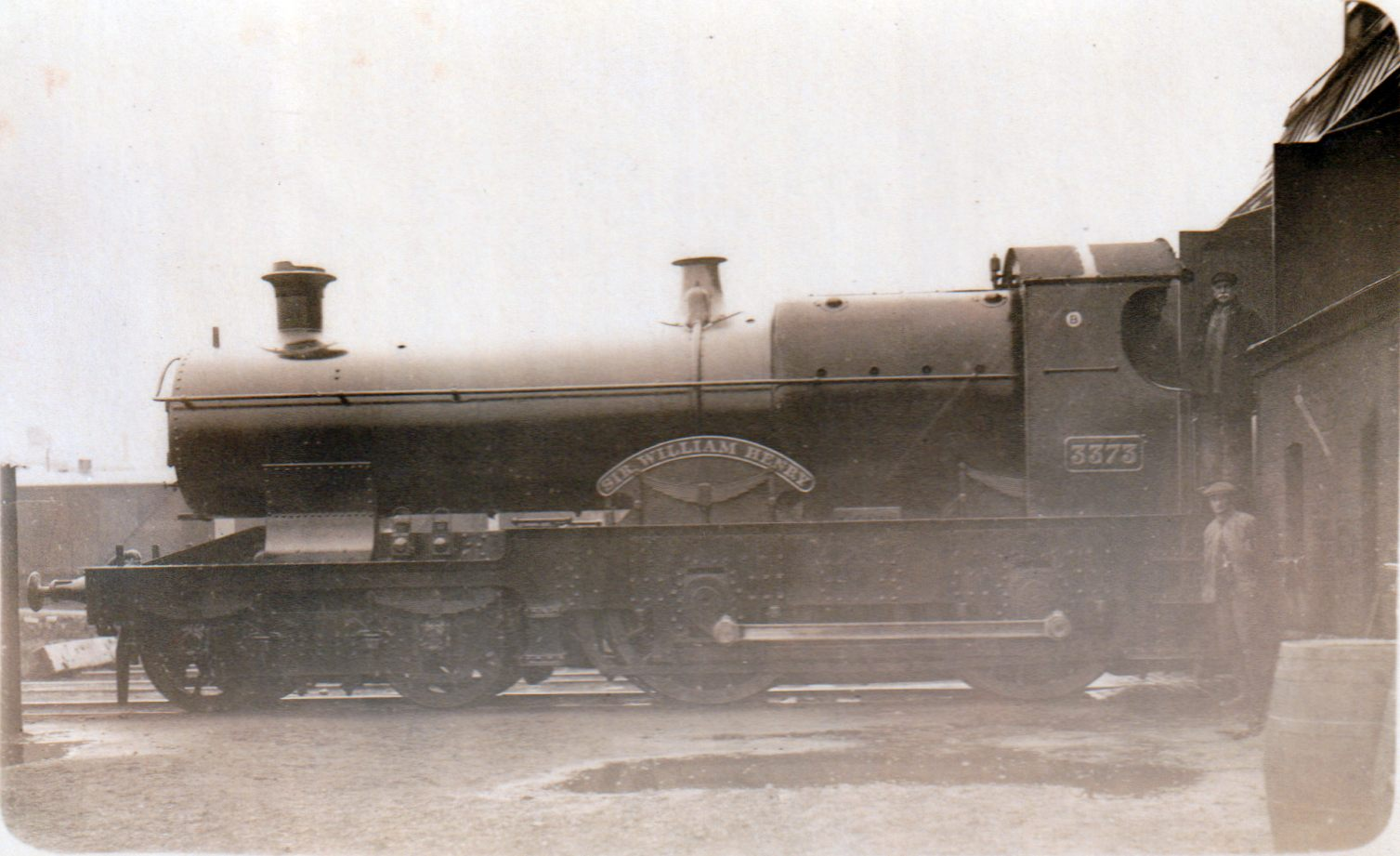
3373 Sir William Henry, straight frames, tapered boiler, built 1903

In September 1903 no. 3443 Birkenhead was built with a tapered Standard No. 2 boiler. The boiler was tapered only over the rear half of the barrel, and this type became known as the "half-cone"; a later version of the No. 2 boiler was tapered over three-quarters of the barrel. A further twenty-nine locomotives were built with the half-cone boiler between September 1903 and April 1904, bringing the class total to ninety-one.

Between April and September 1906 thirty locomotives were built with the three-quarter coned No. 2 boiler. In March 1906, Bulldog was rebuilt with the same type of boiler, and the class now became known as the Bulldog Class. From October 1906 to January 1909 eighteen of the Duke Class were converted to Bulldogs by the fitting of No. 2 boilers. A further member of the Duke Class, no. 3273 Armorel, had been fitted with a parallel domeless boiler in February 1902, thus becoming a Camel Class locomotive. It ran with tapered boilers of various types from April 1906.

The Bird Class were a development of the Bulldog Class with deeper outside frames and a new type of bogie. Previously all outside framed bogies on GWR locomotives had been of the Dean centreless type. Churchward adapted a French design of bogie, as used on the de Glehn Atlantics, to produce a bar-framed bogie for his standard locomotives. This inside-framed bogie design was adapted to produce an outside-framed replacement for the Dean bogie. The Birds were built in two batches; nos. 3731 to 3735 in May 1909 and nos. 3736 to 3745 from November 1909 to January 1910.

Table of orders and numbers
| Year | Quantity | Lot No. | Works Nos. | Loco Nos. (new) | Loco nos. (1912) | Frames |
|---|---|---|---|---|---|---|
| 1899–1900 | 20 | 118 | 1743–1762 | 3332–3351 | 3320–3339 | Curved |
| 1899 | 1 | 120 | 1773 | 3352 | 3340 | Curved |
| 1900 | 20 | 124 | 1806–1825 | 3353–3372 | 3341–3360 | Straight |
| 1902–03 | 20 | 137 | 1970–1989 | 3413–3432 | 3361–3380 | Straight |
| 1903 | 10 | 142 | 2003–2012 | 3443–3452 | 3381–3390 | Straight |
| 1904 | 20 | 148 | 2036–2055 | 3453–3472 | 3391–3410 | Straight |
| 1906 | 15 | 162 | 2169–2183 | 3701–3715 | 3411–3425 | Straight |
| 1906 | 15 | 163 | 2184–2198 | 3716–3730 | 3426–3440 | Straight |
| 1909–10 | 15 | 177 | 2350–2364 | 3731–3745 | 3441–3455 | Straight, deep (Bird class) |

This class were subject to the 1912 renumbering of GWR 4-4-0 locomotives, which saw the Bulldog Class gathered together in the series 3300–3455, and other types renumbered out of that series. The 3300–3455 series had previously contained locomotives of Duke, Badminton, Atbara, City and a number of Bulldog class locomotives. After the renumbering, nos. 3300–19 were former Duke class locomotives rebuilt as Bulldogs between 1902 and 1909; nos. 3320–3440 were those built as Bulldogs; and nos. 3441–55 were the Bird class.

No. 3320 Avalon was the first of the Bulldog Class to be withdrawn, in August 1929, followed by no. 3365 Charles Grey Mott, withdrawn in January 1930. The frames of 3365 were used to construct the first of the Earl Class, no. 3265 Tre Pol and Pen. The last to be withdrawn was no. 3377 Penzance in January 1951.

All of the Bird Class survived into British Railways ownership, being withdrawn between April 1948 and November 1951, the last two being no. 3453 Seagull and no. 3454 Skylark.

No Bulldogs were preserved; however the frames of no. 3425 survive under Earl no. 9017 'Earl of Berkeley' at the Bluebell Railway.

== Accidents and incidents ==
- In 1904, locomotive No. 3460 Montreal was hauling a passenger train with GWR 1661 Class 0-6-0ST No. 1674, when it was derailed at Loughor, Glamorgan due to excessive speed. Five people were killed and eighteen were injured.

== Bulldog Class ==
| First No. | 1912 No. | Name | Built | Withdrawn | Notes |
|---|---|---|---|---|---|
| 3253 | 3300 | Pendennis Castle | | | Name removed in May 1923 |
| 3262 | 3301 | Powderham | | | Name removed in May 1923 |
| 3263 | 3302 | Sir Lancelot | | | |
| 3264 | 3303 | St. Anthony | | | Name removed in August 1930 |
| 3268 | 3304 | River Tamar | | | |
| 3269 | 3305 | Tintagel | | | Name removed in August 1930 |
| 3273 | 3306 | Armorel | | | |
| 3279 | 3307 | Exmoor | | | |
| 3280 | 3308 | Falmouth | | | Name removed in August 1930 |
| 3282 | 3309 | Maristow | | | |
| 3286 | 3310 | St. Just | | | Name removed in July 1930 |
| 3312 | 3311 | Bulldog | | | |
| 3316 | 3312 | Isle of Guernsey | | | |
| 3318 | 3313 | Jupiter | | | |
| 3322 | 3314 | Mersey | | | |
| 3324 | 3315 | Quantock | | | |
| 3325 | 3316 | St. Columb | | | Name removed in August 1930 |
| 3327 | 3317 | Somerset | | | |
| 3330 | 3318 | Vulcan | | 1946 | |
| 3331 | 3319 | Weymouth | | | Name removed in May 1930 |
| 3332 | 3320 | Avalon | November 1899 | August 1929 | |
| 3333 | 3321 | Brasenose | November 1899 | April 1935 | |
| 3334 | 3322 | Eclipse | November 1899 | March 1935 | |
| 3335 | 3323 | Etona | November 1899 | August 1935 | |
| 3336 | 3324 | Glastonbury | December 1899 | June 1935 | Name removed in October 1930 |
| 3337 | 3325 | Kenilworth | December 1899 | September 1935 | Name removed in July 1930 |
| 3338 | 3326 | Laira | January 1900 | November 1933 | Name removed in July 1930 |
| 3339 | 3327 | Marco Polo | January 1900 | March 1936 | |
| 3340 | 3328 | Marazion | January 1900 | April 1934 | Name removed in January 1931 |
| 3341 | 3329 | Mars | January 1908 | May 1932 | |
| 3342 | 3330 | Orion | February 1900 | August 1938 | |
| 3343 | 3331 | Pegasus | February 1900 | February 1934 | |
| 3344 | 3332 | Pluto | February 1900 | October 1931 | |
| 3345 | 3333 | Perseus | February 1900 | October 1932 | |
| 3346 | 3334 | Tavy | February 1900 | April 1930 | |
| 3347 | 3335 | Tregothnan | February 1900 | October 1948 | Name removed in December 1930 |
| 3348 | 3336 | Titan | March 1900 | January 1936 | |
| 3349 | 3337 | The Wolf | March 1900 | May 1934 | |
| 3350 | 3338 | Swift | March 1900 | November 1933 | |
| 3351 | 3339 | Sedgemoor | March 1900 | April 1936 | |
| 3352 | 3340 | Camel | October 1899 | June 1934 | |
| 3353 | 3341 | Blasius | May 1900 | November 1949 | |
| 3354 | 3342 | Bonaventura | June 1900 | October 1938 | |
| 3355 | 3343 | Camelot | June 1900 | March 1934 | |
| 3356 | 3344 | Dartmouth | June 1900 | January 1934 | Name removed in November 1930 |
| 3357 | 3345 | Smeaton | June 1900 | January 1936 | |
| 3358 | 3346 | Godolphin | October 1900 | January 1934 | |
| 3359 | 3347 | Kingsbridge | October 1900 | August 1936 | Name removed in September 1930 |
| 3360 | 3348 | Launceston | October 1900 | November 1934 | Name removed in November 1930 |
| 3361 | 3349 | Lyonesse | October 1900 | November 1934 | |
| 3362 | 3350 | Newlyn | November 1900 | July 1935 | Name removed in July 1930 |
| 3363 | 3351 | One and All | November 1900 | March 1931 | |
| 3364 | 3352 | Pendragon | November 1900 | November 1933 | |
| 3365 | 3353 | Plymouth | November 1900 | December 1946 | renamed Pershore Plum in May 1927 |
| 3366 | 3354 | Restormel | November 1900 | November 1934 | Name removed in September 1930 |
| 3367 | 3355 | St. Aubyn | November 1900 | January 1934 | Name removed in September 1930 |
| 3368 | 3356 | Sir Stafford | November 1900 | January 1936 | |
| 3369 | 3357 | Trelawny | November 1900 | November 1934 | |
| 3370 | 3358 | Tremayne | December 1900 | November 1945 | Name refers to the Cornish family whose members also included Arthur Tremayne (1827 - 1905) and John Claude Lewis Tremayne (1869 - 1949) |
| 3371 | 3359 | Tregeagle | December 1900 | September 1936 | |
| 3372 | 3360 | Torquay | December 1900 | November 1934 | Name removed in September 1930 |
| 3413 | 3361 | Edward VII | December 1902 | September 1947 | Name removed in May 1927 |
| 3414 | 3362 | Albert Brassey | December 1902 | April 1937 | |
| 3415 | 3363 | Baldwin | January 1903 | October 1949 | Renamed Alfred Baldwin in April 1903 |
| 3416 | 3364 | Bibby | February 1903 | June 1949 | Renamed Frank Bibby in April 1903 |
| 3417 | 3365 | C. G. Mott | February 1903 | January 1930 | Renamed Charles Grey Mott in January 1904. Rebuilt to Earl 3265 |
| 3418 | 3366 | Earl of Cork | February 1903 | April 1948 | Name removed in May 1936 |
| 3419 | 3367 | Evan Llewllyn | February 1903 | September 1935 | |
| 3420 | 3368 | Ernest Palmer | February 1903 | March 1935 | Renamed Sir Ernest Palmer in February 1916; name removed in January 1924 |
| 3421 | 3369 | Mac Iver | February 1903 | July 1936 | Renamed David Mac Iver in June 1903 |
| 3422 | 3370 | Sir John Llewelyn | March 1903 | February 1939 | |
| 3423 | 3371 | Sir Massey | March 1903 | November 1944 | Renamed Sir Massey Lopes in October 1903 |
| 3424 | 3372 | Sir Nigel | March 1903 | October 1936 | Renamed Sir N. Kingscote in December 1903 |
| 3425 | 3373 | Sir W. H. Wills | May 1903 | February 1939 | Renamed Sir William Henry in January 1906 |
| 3426 | 3374 | Walter Long | May 1903 | June 1937 | Rebuilt as Earl 3213 |
| 3427 | 3375 | Sir Watkin Wynn | May 1903 | September 1947 | |
| 3428 | 3376 | River Plym | May 1903 | September 1948 | |
| 3429 | 3377 | Penzance | May 1903 | March 1951 | Name removed in August 1930 |
| 3430 | 3378 | River Tawe | May 1903 | November 1945 | Name removed in 1939 |
| 3431 | 3379 | River Fal | May 1903 | June 1948 | |
| 3432 | 3380 | River Yealm | May 1903 | March 1938 | Rebuilt as Earl 3218 |
| 3443 | 3381 | Birkenhead | September 1903 | November 1935 | Name removed in August 1930 |
| 3444 | 3382 | Cardiff | September 1903 | November 1949 | Name removed in May 1927 |
| 3445 | 3383 | Ilfracombe | September 1903 | December 1949 | Name removed in August 1930 |
| 3446 | 3384 | Liverpool | September 1903 | May 1936 | Renamed Swindon in October 1903; name removed in May 1927 |
| 3447 | 3385 | Newport | September 1903 | November 1934 | Name removed in May 1927 |
| 3448 | 3386 | Paddington | September 1903 | November 1949 | Name removed in May 1927 |
| 3449 | 3387 | Reading | October 1903 | December 1934 | Name removed in May 1927 |
| 3450 | 3388 | Swansea | October 1903 | October 1935 | Name removed in May 1927 |
| 3451 | 3389 | Taunton | October 1903 | November 1945 | Name removed in May 1927 |
| 3452 | 3390 | Wolverhampton | October 1903 | March 1939 | Name removed in May 1927; rebuilt as Earl 3226 |
| 3453 | 3391 | Dominion of Canada | January 1904 | May 1948 | |
| 3454 | 3392 | New Zealand | January 1904 | March 1937 | Rebuilt as Earl 3209 |
| 3455 | 3393 | Australia | January 1904 | November 1949 | |
| 3456 | 3394 | Albany | January 1904 | November 1934 | |
| 3457 | 3395 | Tasmania | January 1904 | August 1948 | |
| 3458 | 3396 | Natal Colony | January 1904 | March 1948 | |
| 3459 | 3397 | Toronto | February 1904 | November 1934 | |
| 3460 | 3398 | Montreal | February 1904 | September 1935 | |
| 3461 | 3399 | Ottawa | February 1904 | October 1947 | |
| 3462 | 3400 | Winnipeg | February 1904 | May 1949 | |
| 3463 | 3401 | Vancouver | March 1904 | November 1949 | |
| 3464 | 3402 | Jamaica | March 1904 | March 1937 | Rebuilt as Earl 3210 |
| 3465 | 3403 | Trinidad | March 1904 | January 1937 | Rebuilt as Earl 3208 |
| 3466 | 3404 | Barbados | March 1904 | September 1937 | Rebuilt as Earl 3216 |
| 3467 | 3405 | Empire of India | March 1904 | April 1937 | Rebuilt as Earl 3212 |
| 3468 | 3406 | Calcutta | March 1904 | January 1951 | |
| 3469 | 3407 | Madras | April 1904 | December 1949 | |
| 3470 | 3408 | Bombay | April 1904 | April 1948 | |
| 3471 | 3409 | Queensland | April 1904 | January 1939 | Rebuilt as Earl 3224 |
| 3472 | 3410 | Columbia | April 1904 | November 1936 | Rebuilt as Earl 3207 |
| 3701 | 3411 | Stanley Baldwin | April 1906 | October 1938 | Named in January 1909; name removed in July 1937. Rebuilt as Earl 3221 |
| 3702 | 3412 | John G. Griffiths | April 1906 | March 1936 | Named in July 1914. Rebuilt as Earl 3201 |
| 3703 | 3413 | James Mason | April 1906 | August 1936 | Rebuilt as Earl 3205 |
| 3704 | 3414 | A. H. Mills | May 1906 | October 1938 | Named in July 1914; renamed Sir Edward Elgar in 1932; rebuilt as Earl 3220 |
| 3705 | 3415 | George A. Wills | May 1906 | February 1937 | Rebuilt as Earl 3211 |
| 3706 | 3416 | John W. Wilson | June 1906 | May 1936 | Rebuilt as Earl 3202 |
| 3707 | 3417 | Francis Mildmay | June 1906 | April 1948 | Renamed Lord Mildmay of Fleet; renamed Lord Mildmay of Flete in 1923 |
| 3708 | 3418 | Sir Arthur Yorke | June 1906 | August 1949 | |
| 3709 | 3419 | — | June 1906 | August 1949 | |
| 3710 | 3420 | — | June 1906 | September 1937 | Rebuilt as Earl 3215 |
| 3711 | 3421 | — | June 1906 | November 1948 | |
| 3712 | 3422 | Aberystwyth | June 1906 | March 1936 | Named in June 1913; name removed in August 1930. Rebuilt as Earl 3200 |
| 3713 | 3423 | — | June 1906 | January 1939 | Rebuilt as Earl 3223 |
| 3714 | 3424 | — | July 1906 | May 1936 | Rebuilt as Earl 3203 |
| 3715 | 3425 | — | June 1906 | February 1938 | Rebuilt as Earl 3217 |
| 3716 | 3426 | — | July 1906 | December 1949 | |
| 3717 | 3427 | — | July 1906 | April 1938 | Rebuilt as Earl 3219 |
| 3718 | 3428 | — | July 1906 | October 1936 | Rebuilt as Earl 3206 |
| 3719 | 3429 | — | July 1906 | September 1939 | Rebuilt as Earl 3228 |
| 3720 | 3430 | Inchcape | August 1906 | December 1948 | Named in February 1923 |
| 3721 | 3431 | — | August 1906 | December 1948 | |
| 3722 | 3432 | — | August 1906 | December 1949 | |
| 3723 | 3433 | — | August 1906 | April 1939 | Rebuilt as Earl 3227 |
| 3724 | 3434 | Joseph Shaw | August 1906 | July 1937 | Rebuilt as Earl 3214 |
| 3725 | 3435 | — | August 1906 | November 1945 | |
| 3726 | 3436 | — | August 1906 | December 1938 | Rebuilt as Earl 3222 |
| 3727 | 3437 | — | September 1906 | March 1939 | Rebuilt as Earl 3225 |
| 3728 | 3438 | — | September 1906 | October 1949 | |
| 3729 | 3439 | Weston-super-Mare | September 1906 | July 1936 | Name removed in August 1930. Rebuilt as Earl 3204 |
| 3730 | 3440 | — | September 1906 | June 1948 | |

== Bird Class ==
| First No. | 1912 No. | Name | Built | Withdrawn | Notes |
|---|---|---|---|---|---|
| 3731 | 3441 | Blackbird | 1909 | 1949 | |
| 3732 | 3442 | Bullfinch | 1909 | 1948 | |
| 3733 | 3443 | Chaffinch | 1909 | 1949 | |
| 3734 | 3444 | Cormorant | 1909 | 1951 | |
| 3735 | 3445 | Flamingo | 1909 | 1948 | |
| 3736 | 3446 | Goldfinch | 1909 | 1948 | |
| 3737 | 3447 | Jackdaw | 1909 | 1951 | |
| 3738 | 3448 | Kingfisher | 1909 | 1949 | |
| 3739 | 3449 | Nightingale | 1909 | 1951 | |
| 3740 | 3450 | Peacock | 1909 | 1949 | |
| 3741 | 3451 | Pelican | 1910 | 1951 | |
| 3742 | 3452 | Penguin | 1910 | 1948 | |
| 3743 | 3453 | Seagull | 1910 | 1951 | |
| 3744 | 3454 | Skylark | 1910 | 1951 | |
| 3745 | 3455 | Starling | 1910 | 1950 | |
