= Governor of Landguard Fort =

Nathaniel Darrel, who led 1667 defense

The Governor of Landguard Fort was a British military officer who commanded the fortifications at Landguard Fort, protecting the port of Harwich. Landguard successfully held off a Dutch raid in 1667 and continued to be used for military purposes through the 1950s. The office of Governor was abolished in 1833, and of Lieutenant-Governor in 1854.

== Governors of Landguard Fort ==
- 1628–1648: Henry Rich, 1st Earl of Holland
- 1648–1652: Thomas Ireton
- 1652–1655: Benjamin Gifford
- 1655–1659: Mathew Cadwell
- 1659–1660: Humphrey Brewster
- 1660–1664: Charles Rich, 4th Earl of Warwick
- 1664–1665: Henry Farr
- 1665–1666: James Howard, 3rd Earl of Suffolk
- 1666–1667: Henry Farr
- 1667–1670: Nathaniel Darell
- 1670–1680: Sir Charles Lyttelton, 3rd Baronet
- 1680–1687: Sir Roger Manley
- 1687–1688: William Eyton
- 1688–1694: Henry Killigrew
- 1694–1696: Edward Fitzpatrick
- 1697–1711: Edward Jones
- 1711–1719: Francis Hammond
- 1719–1744: Bacon Morris
- 1744–1753: Mordaunt Cracherode
- 1753–1768: Lord George Beauclerk
- 1768–1770: Robert Armiger
- 1770–1777: Sir John Clavering
- 1778–1788: Alexander Mackay
- 1788–1800: Harry Trelawny
- 1800–1801: David Dundas
- 1801–1823: Cavendish Lister
- 1823–1833: Sir Robert Brownrigg, 1st Baronet

== Lieutenant-Governors of Landguard Fort ==
- 1687–1711: Francis Hammond
- 1711–1717: Matthew Draper
- 1717–1718: Gwyn Vaughan
- 1718–1719: Bacon Morris
- 1719–172x: Hugh Plunknet
- 1727–1753: Edward Hayes
- 1753–1766: Philip Thicknesse
- 1766–1804: Anketell Singleton
- 1804–1806: John Blake
- 1806–1811: Alexander Mair
- 1811–1854: Charles Augustus West
