= Harry Trelawny (disambiguation) =

Harry Trelawny may refer to:

- Sir Harry Trelawny, 5th Baronet (1687–1762), British officer
- Harry Trelawny (1726–1800), British general and Coldstream Guards officer, nephew of the 5th Baronet
- Sir Harry Trelawny, 7th Baronet (1756–1834), Protestant preacher and convert to Roman Catholicism, nephew of the general

== See also ==
- Henry Trelawny (c. 1658–1702), British Army officer and member of parliament
