= David Dundas (British Army officer) =

British Army officer (1735–1820)

General The Right Honourable Sir David Dundas GCB
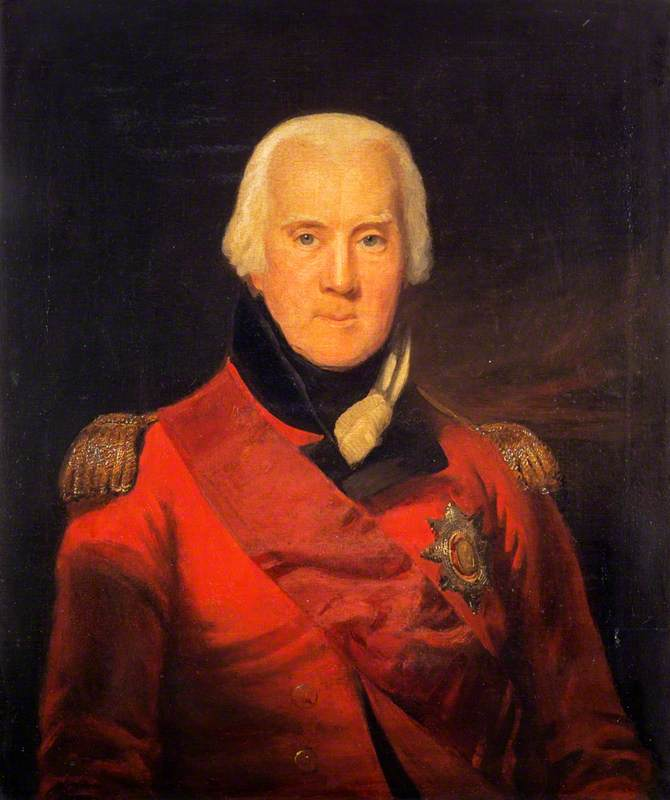
- Portrait by Samuel Drummond
- Born: 1735; Edinburgh, Scotland
- Died: 1820 (aged 84–85); Royal Chelsea Hospital, England
- Military career
- Allegiance: Great Britain; United Kingdom
- Branch: British Army
- Service years: 1755–1820
- Rank: General
- Commands: Commander-in-Chief of the Forces (1809–1811); Northern District (1807–1809)
- Conflicts: Seven Years' War; French Revolutionary Wars

General Sir David Dundas, GCB, PC (1735 – 18 February 1820) was a British Army officer who fought in the Seven Years' War and French Revolutionary Wars, wrote important texts on the Principles of Military Movements and then served as Commander-in-Chief of the Forces from 1809 to 1811.

== Military service ==
The son of Robert Dundas, a Scottish merchant, and Margaret Dundas (née Watson), Dundas was enrolled at the Royal Military Academy, Woolwich. Whilst still a cadet at the Academy, he spent some time with his uncle, Colonel David Watson, the Director of the Military Survey of the Highlands, where he was grounded in the arts of surveying under the tutelage of William Roy. He graduated as a lieutenant-fireworker in the Royal Artillery on 1 March 1755. He exchanged to the 56th Foot as a lieutenant on 24 January 1756, serving with this regiment during the Seven Years' War taking part in combined operations against the French ports of St. Malo and Cherbourg and fighting at the Battle of Saint Cast in September 1758.

Promoted to captain on 21 March 1759, he transferred to the 15th Dragoons and fought at the Battle of Warburg in July 1760, the Battle of Kloster Kampen in October 1760 and the Battle of Villinghausen in July 1761. Dundas was also present at the fall of Havana in August 1762. He was promoted to major on 28 May 1770 and lieutenant colonel on 12 December 1775. On 31 December 1777, he was appointed Quartermaster-General in Ireland, in which post he was promoted to brevet colonel on 12 February 1782.

== Army improvements ==
On 31 August 1783, Dundas left regimental service and became an advocate of officer training in the British Army, writing many manuals on the subject, the first being Principles of Military Movements, which was published in 1788. He chose to play down the light infantry tactics that generals such as Lord Cornwallis or Willam Howe favoured during the American War of Independence. Instead, after witnessing Prussian army manoeuvres in Silesia in 1784, Dundas favoured the army model that Frederick the Great had created. Its use of drilled battalions of line infantry marching in formation was a stark contrast to the light brigades that fought in small independent groups and with cover during the American War of Independence.

== Later career ==
The Siege of Toulon, where Dundas was second in command, during the French Revolutionary Wars

On 23 June 1789, he became Adjutant-General in Ireland, where he was able deploy his ideas for military training. He was promoted to major-general on 1 May 1790 and, as Britain became involved in the French Revolutionary Wars, he was appointed second in command at the siege of Toulon under O’Hara and Lord Mulgrave from September 1793, where he commanded an abortive attack on the Arenes Heights on 30 November 1793. Dundas became commanding officer under Lord Hood after O’Hara's capture in this action. He lost Fort Mulgrave and Mount Faron after a 3-day bombardment on 17 December 1793. Dundas commanded the initial expedition to Corsica in 1794, landing 7 February 1794 and capturing the Mortella Tower. Next, he captured the Port of San Fiorenzo and Bastia, an important first step ultimately leading to the capture of the island and establishment of a short-lived Anglo-Corsican Kingdom by forces under Hood and Admiral Lord Nelson.

Hood forced Dundas to resign on 10 March 1794; Dundas transferred to serve in the Flanders Campaign under the Duke of York. Appointed commander of the 2nd Cavalry brigade after the death of John Mansel at Beaumont on 26 April 1794, he distinguished himself at Willems on 10 May, and was attached to Otto's column at Tourcoing later that month. Dundas replaced Sir Robert Laurie at the head of his brigade during the retreat to Antwerp. In December, while commanding the British Right under Harcourt, he led the attack at Tuil on 30 December and directed the rearguard action at Geldermalsen on 5 January 1795. He was made commander of the British forces (mainly cavalry) left behind at Bremen in April 1795 and given the local rank of brevet lieutenant general while remaining in Europe on 2 May 1795.

On 26 December 1795, Dundas became Colonel of the 7th Light Dragoons and on 8 November 1796 he became Quartermaster-General to the Forces in which role he implemented the army's official drill book for Cavalry officers. He was promoted to the substantive rank of lieutenant-general on 4 February 1797.

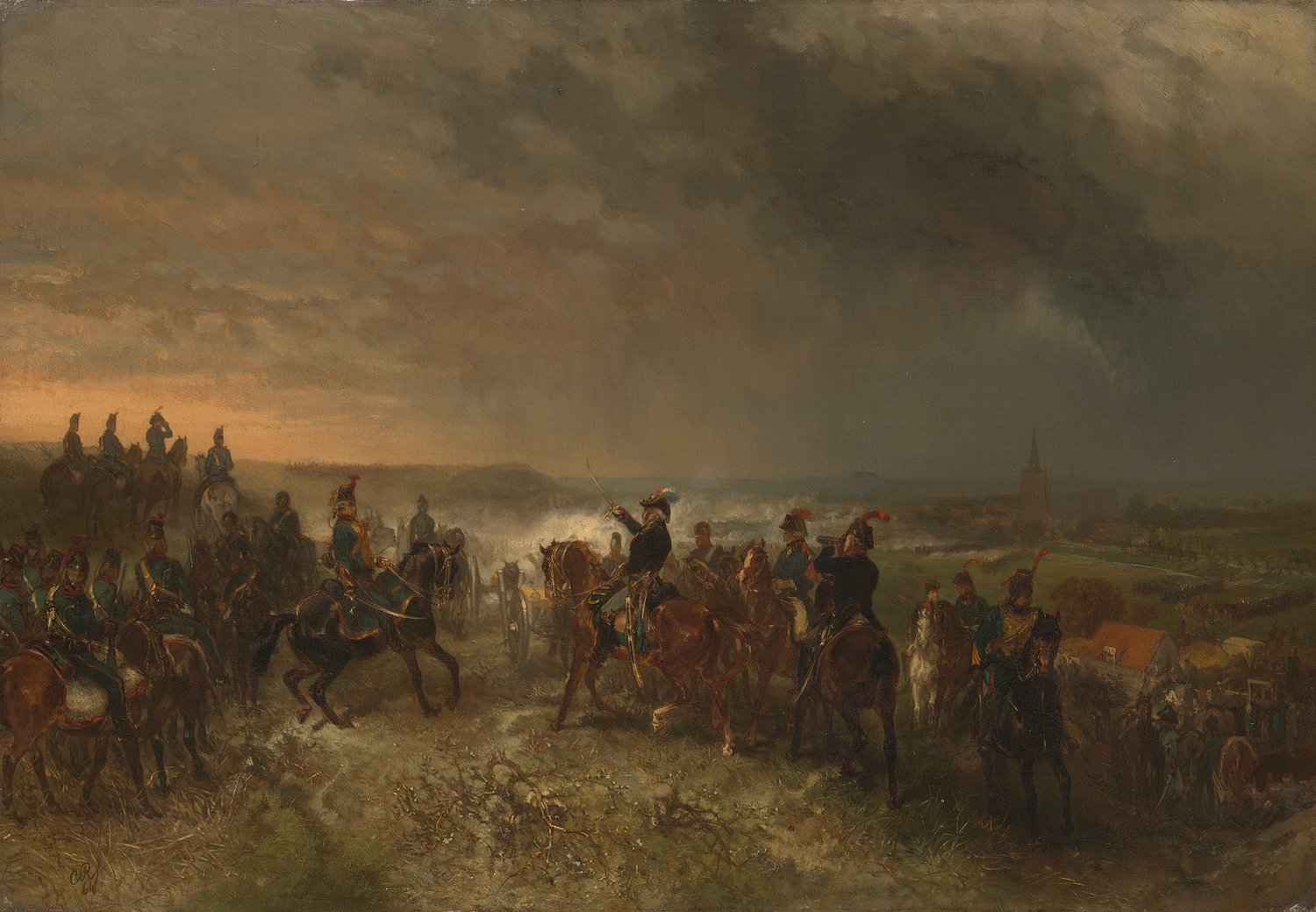
The Battle of Castricum, at which Dundas commanded the 3rd Division

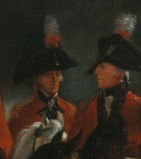
Dundas (right) with Philip Goldsworthy from George III Reviewing Troops (1798)

Dundas commanded the 3rd Division under the Duke of York in the Helder Campaign 1799, seeing action at Den Helder on 27 August, Zype on 10 September, Bergen on 19 September, Alkmaar on 2 October and Castricum on 6 October. On 15 February 1800, he was given the honorary appointment of Governor of Landguard Fort.

He was made Colonel of 2nd Dragoons on 9 May 1801, promoted to general on 24 April 1802 and made commander in Kent and Sussex from 1803. Dundas was appointed Knight of the Order of the Bath on 28 April 1803 and went into semi-retirement in 1805. In January 1806, he commanded the troops participating in the state funeral of Horatio Nelson. He became General Officer Commanding Northern District in 1807 and, in that capacity, he was involved in suppressing a keelmen's strike on Tyneside. He chaired the hearing against Le Marchant on charges of calumny from 23 January 1807, was a member of the Court Martial that tried Whitelocke for the failure of the Buenos Aires expedition on 28 January 1808 and was a member of the Board of Enquiry of the Convention of Cintra in 1808. He was appointed Colonel-in-Chief of the 95th Foot on 31 August 1809.

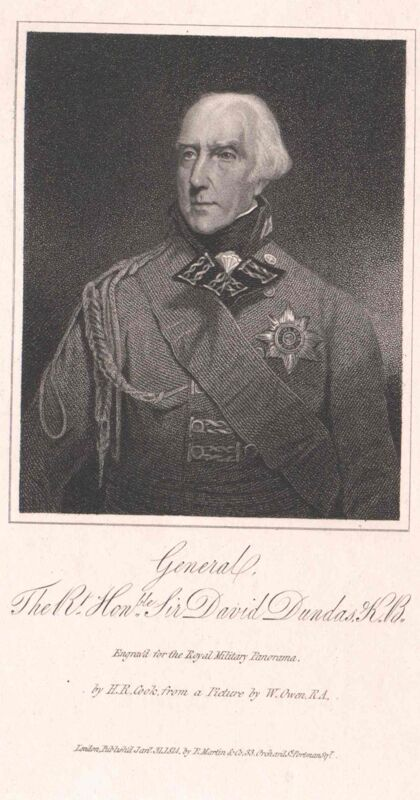
Dundas, Sir David - Austrian National Library, Austria - Public Domain.

Dundas was Commander-in-Chief of the Forces from 1809 to 1811, during the Duke of York's period of disgrace following a scandal caused by the activities of his latest mistress, Mary Anne Clarke. Dundas was also a Privy Councillor from 22 March 1809 and Colonel of the 1st Dragoon Guards from 27 January 1813.

Dundas was Governor of the Royal Hospital Chelsea from 3 April 1804 until his death. Advanced to Knight Grand Cross of the Order of the Bath on 4 January 1815, he died at the Royal Hospital Chelsea on 18 February 1820 and is buried in the grounds.

== Assessment ==
In the army, Dundas was nicknamed "Old Pivot" for his Prussian-style drill books. Burne describes him as "A level-headed officer", but "cautious", while Bunbury writes "He...was an aged man...a brave, careful, and well-skilled soldier...Dundas was a tall, spare man, crabbed and austere, dry in his looks and demeanour...there were peculiarities in his habits and style which excited some ridicule amongst young officers. But though it appeared a little out of fashion, there was 'much care and valour in that Scotchman'". Thoumine writes that "Dundas was perhaps not as graceful nor as polished as some of his contemporaries, but he was as sound as oak and utterly reliable".

== Family ==
In 1807, he married Charlotte De Lancey, daughter of Brigadier General Oliver De Lancey (1718-1785); they had no children.

== Sources ==
- Baines, Edward (1817). A History of the Wars of the French Revolution. Vol. I. ISBN 978-1-270-94842-1.
- Bunbury, Henry (1854). Narratives of Some Passages in the Great War with France, from 1799 to 1810. R. Bentley. ISBN 978-0-548-27915-1.
- Burne, Alfred (1949). The Noble Duke of York: The Military Life of Frederick Duke of York and Albany. Staples Press.
- Fewster, Joseph (2011). The Keelmen of Tyneside: Labour Organisation and Conflict in the North-East Coal Industry, 1600–1830. Boydell Press. ISBN 9781843836322.
- Fortescue, John (1918). British Campaigns in Flanders 1690–1794.
- Haythornthwaite, Philip J. (2008). British Napoleonic Infantry Tactics 1792–1815. Osprey Publishing. ISBN 978-1-84603-222-6.
- Thoumine, Reginald (1968). Scientific Soldier, A Life of General Le Marchant 1766–1812. Oxford University Press.

Military offices
Preceded by Charles O'Hara	Colonel of the 22nd (the Cheshire) Regiment of Foot; 1791–1795	Succeeded by William Crosbie
Preceded by Sir Henry Clinton	Colonel of the 7th (or Queen's Own) Regiment of (Light) Dragoons; 1795–1801	Succeeded by Lord Paget
Preceded by George Morrison	Quartermaster-General to the Forces; 1796–1803	Succeeded by Sir Robert Brownrigg
Preceded by Harry Trelawny	Governor of Landguard Fort; 1800–1801	Succeeded by Cavendish Lister
Preceded by Sir Ralph Abercromby	Colonel of the 2nd (Royal North British) Regiment of Dragoons; 1801–1813	Succeeded by The Marquess of Lothian
Preceded by Sir Ralph Abercromby	Governor of Fort George; 1801–1804	Succeeded by William Dalrymple
Preceded by Sir Hew Dalrymple	GOC Northern District; 1807–1809	Succeeded by Sir Charles Green
Preceded by The Duke of York	Commander-in-Chief of the Forces; 1809–1811	Succeeded by The Duke of York
Preceded by Coote Manningham	Colonel-in-Chief of The Rifle Brigade; 1809–1820	Succeeded by The Duke of Wellington
Preceded by The Lord Heathfield	Colonel of the 1st (The King's) Dragoon Guards; 1813–1820	Succeeded by Francis Edward Gwyn
Honorary titles
Preceded by Sir William Fawcett	Governor, Royal Hospital Chelsea; 1804–1820	Succeeded by Sir Samuel Hulse
