= Landguard Fort =

Historic fort in Suffolk, England

Coordinates: 51.9389°N 1.3211°E

- Felixstowe, Suffolk, England
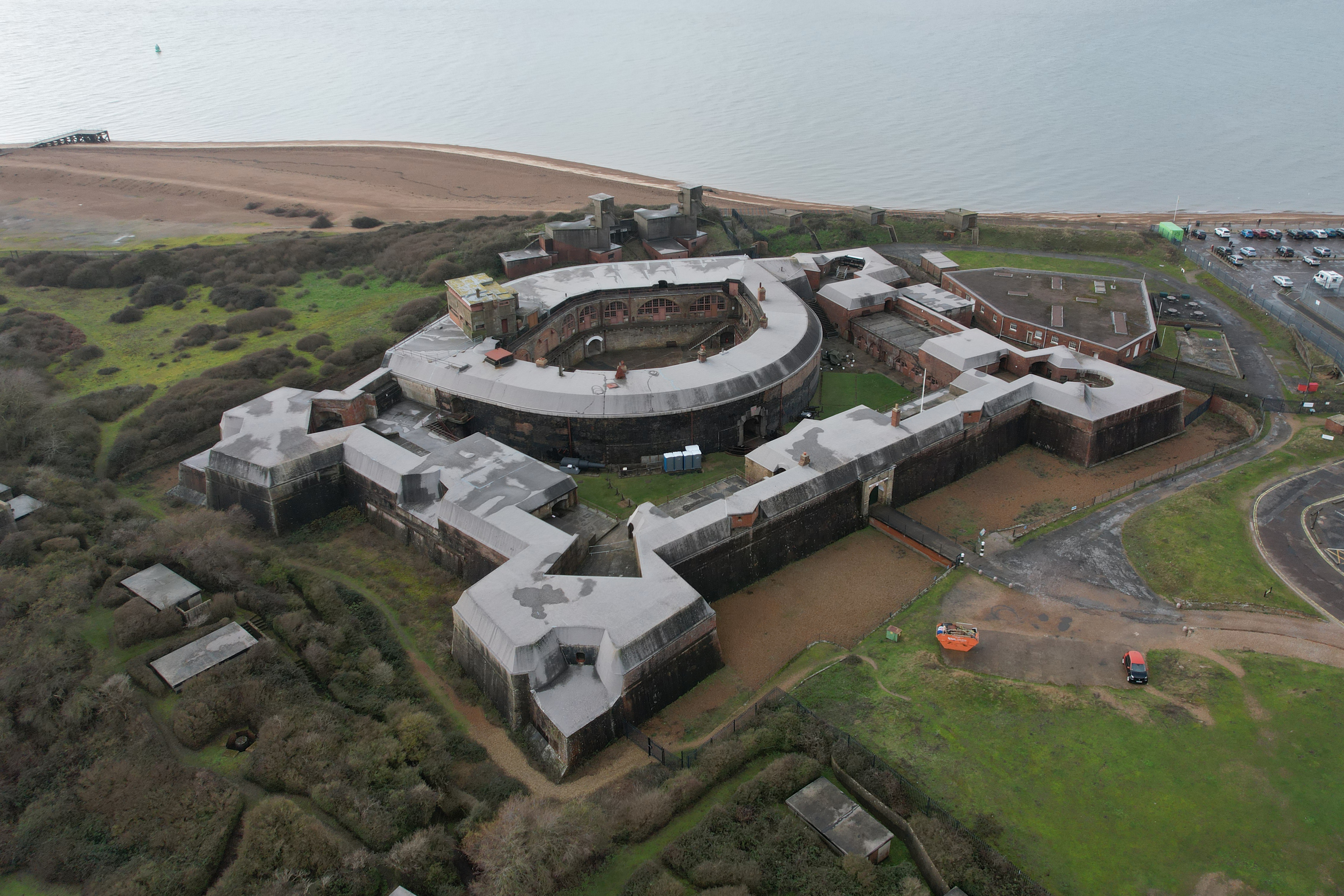
- Aerial photo of Landguard Fort in 2026

Site information
- Type: Fort battery
- Owner: English Heritage
- Condition: Intact

Site history
- Built: 1717

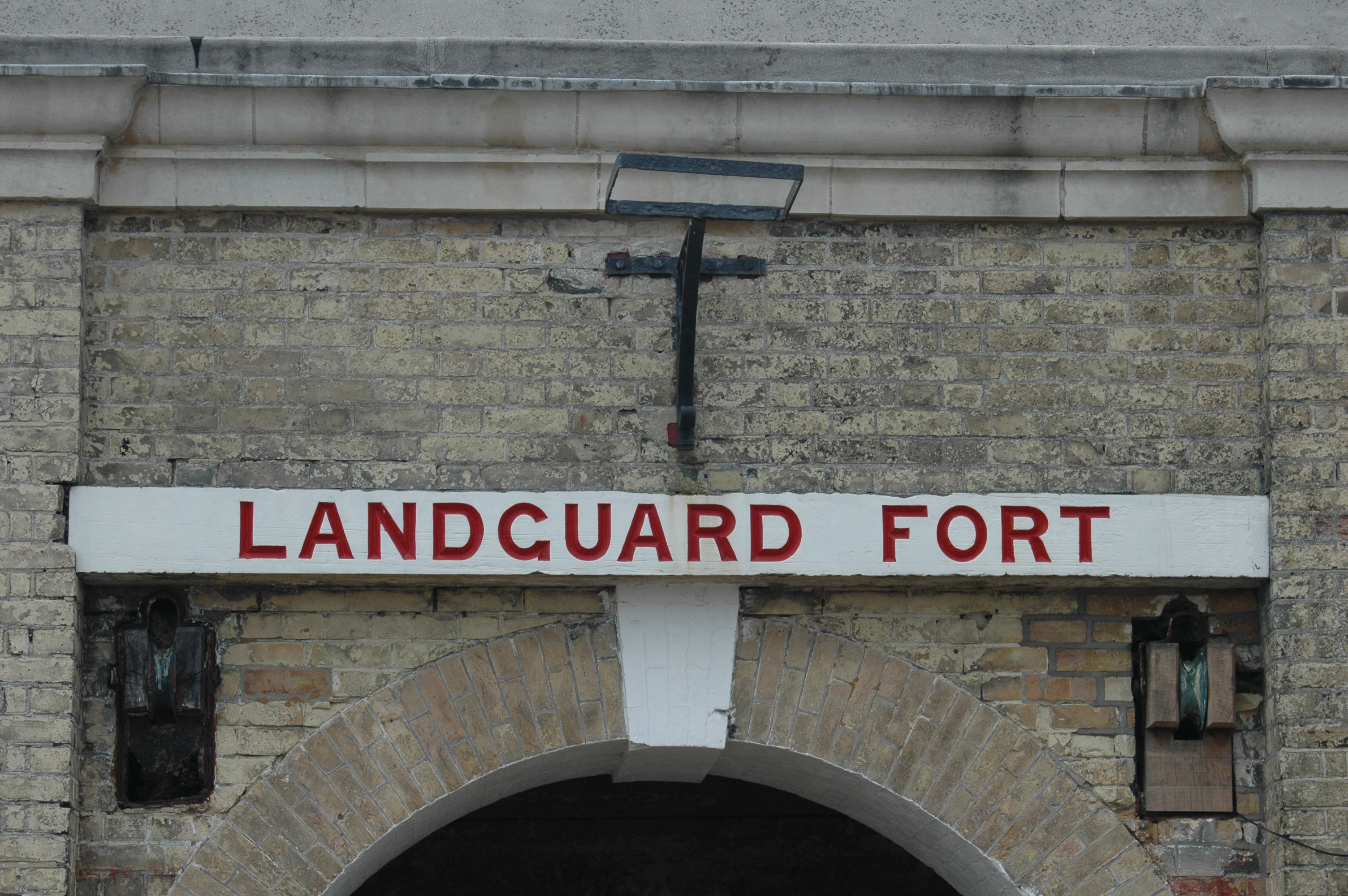
Entrance sign at Landguard Fort

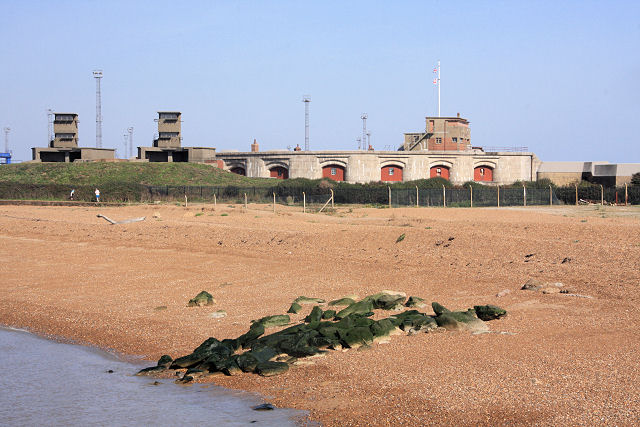
Landguard Fort from Landguard Point

Landguard Fort is a fort at the mouth of the River Orwell outside Felixstowe, Suffolk, designed to guard the mouth of the river. It is now managed by the charity English Heritage and is open to the public.

== History ==
Originally known as Langer Fort, the first fortifications from 1540 were a few earthworks and blockhouse, but it was King James I who ordered, from 1621, the construction of a square fort with bulwarks at each corner.

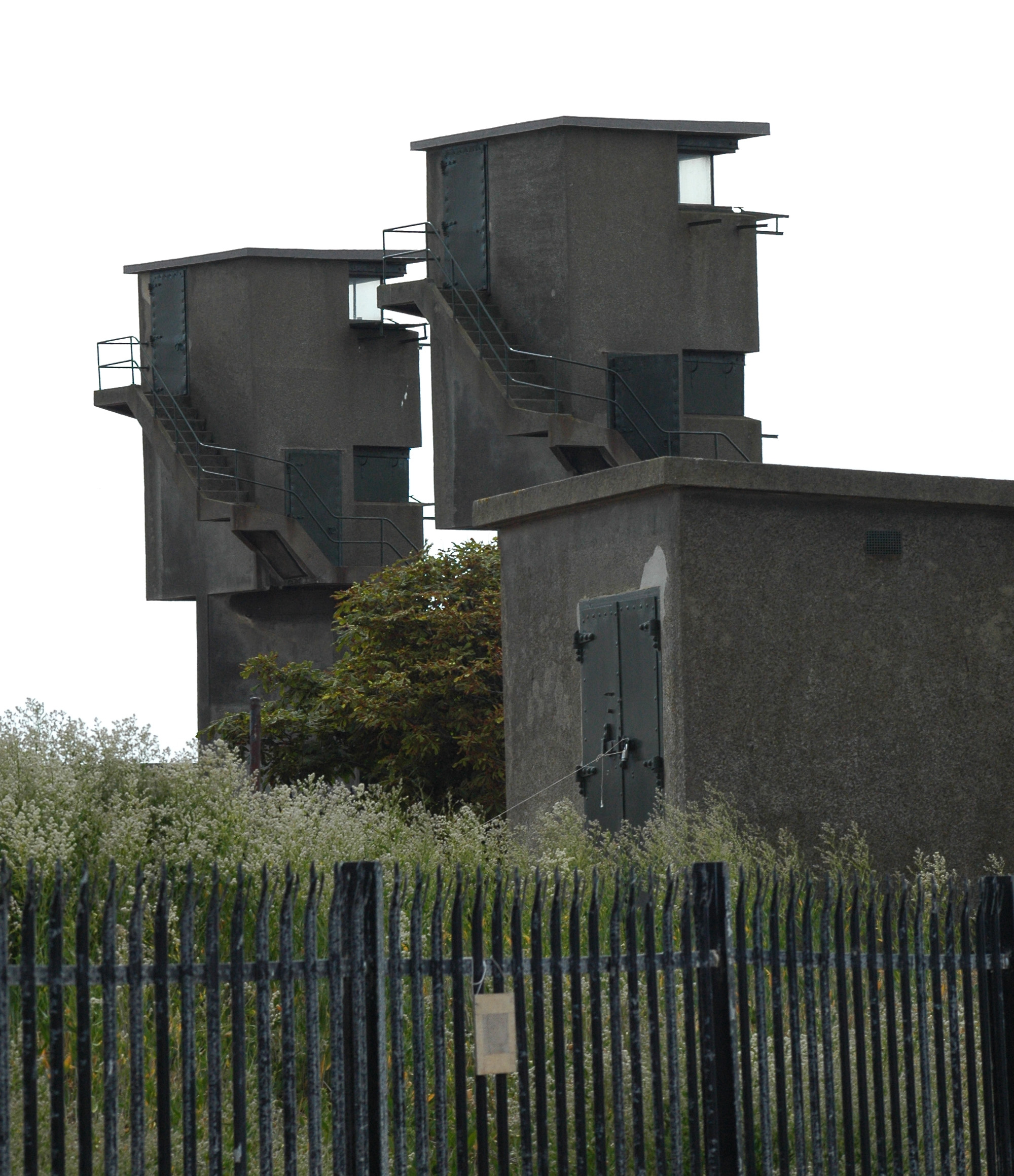
Darell's Battery at Landguard Fort

In 1667, the Dutch, under Michiel de Ruyter, landed a force of 2,000 men on Felixstowe beach in front of (what is now called) Undercliff Road East and advanced on to the fort, but were repulsed by Nathaniel Darrel and his garrison of 400 musketeers of the Duke of York & Albany's Maritime Regiment (the first Royal Marines) and 100 artillerymen with 54 cannons.

The fort was considered part of Essex in the 18th and 19th centuries; births and deaths within the garrison were recorded as 'Landguard Fort, Essex'.

A new Fort battery was built in 1717, and a complete new fort on an adjoining site was started in 1745 to a pentagonal bastioned trace. New batteries were built in the 1750s and 1780s. The biggest change occurred in the 1870s when the interior barracks were rebuilt to a keep-like design and the river frontage was rebuilt with a new casemated battery covered by a very unusual caponier with a quarter-sphere bombproof nose. Several open bastions were enclosed, and a mock ravelin block was constructed to house a submarine mining contingent.

Two landscapes were commissioned, c.1755, from Thomas Gainsborough - then still little-known and living at Ipswich (1750-9) - for the Governor's Quarters at Landguard by his friend Philip Thicknesse, Lt. Governor of Landguard Fort. These were later destroyed by the damp conditions at the Fort, but an engraving of one of them survives.

In the Napoleonic Wars, the strength and combat readiness of the Fort caused the Army repeated concern. In 1801, General Lord Cornwallis, Eastern District commander-in-chief visited Landguard Fort. After 1804 steps were taken to extend and strengthen the Fort with the supply and ammunition stores moved across to Harwich for safety. The badly-disciplined garrison had drunk gin found on a captured smugglers' boat leading to the death of four soldiers, probably from alcohol poisoning.

During the Second World War, Landguard Fort was used as one of the launch sites of Operation Outward. This was a project to attack Germany by means of free-flying hydrogen balloons that carried incendiary devices or trailing steel wires (intended to damage power lines.) Between 1942 and 1944, many thousands of balloons were launched.

The main uses of the Fort and nearby structures were:

- Headquarters for the coast artillery guns defending Harwich Harbour. In 1944 radar was installed for their fire control. By 1941 4 6-inch and 2 twin six-pounder guns were operational on the Landguard Peninsula, housed in concrete emplacements which still remain;
- Headquarters and Plot Room for the heavy anti-aircraft defending the Harwich-Ipswich area. This function was moved to Martello Tower Q in Felixstowe town in 1941;
- Naval Port War Signal Station; controlling ship movements in and out of Harwich Harbour, Stour and Orwell;
- Remote control station for defensive minefields in the harbour entrance.

Observers on top of Landguard Fort witnessed and plotted many air raids, German minelaying actions, shipwrecks and air crashes. In 1944, in a probable false alarm, the Landguard guns opened up on supposed German midget-sub raiders in the harbour entrance. Later that year, Allied landing ships loaded at the former RAF piers just to the north.

The 10-inch gun pit in Left Battery was converted into an Anti-aircraft Operations Room for Harwich in 1939.

The Army left the Fort in 1957.

The fort has been structurally consolidated. It is now under the guardianship of English Heritage and is open to the public.

== See also ==
- Governor of Landguard Fort
- Walton Castle, Suffolk

== Bibliography ==
- The History of Landguard Fort in Suffolk by Major J. H. Leslie, Eyre & Spottiswoode (pub. 1898) available online at the Internet Archive
- J P Foynes analyses the Fort's wartime history in some detail in "East Anglia against the Tricolor" (published 2016), "The Battle of the East Coast" (1994) and "Who was to Blame for the Loss of HMS Gipsy?" (2005). Each book gives relevant archival references.
- Suffolk Invasion: The Dutch Attack on Landguard Fort, 1667 by Frank Hussey, Terence Dalton Ltd. (pub. 1983). Reprinted by the Landguard Fort Trust, 2005.
