= Charles Trelawny (disambiguation) =

Charles Trelawny may refer to:

- Charles Trelawny (died 1731), soldier and MP for East Looe and Plymouth
- Charles Trelawny (died 1764), MP for Liskeard
- Charles Trelawny Brereton, born Charles Trelawny (died 1820), MP for Mitchell
