= Trelawny =

Trelawny or Trelawney may refer to:

== Places ==
- Trelawny (electoral division), an electoral division of Cornwall
- Trelawny, Black Hill, Ballarat, a heritage house in Ballarat, Victoria, Australia
- Trelawny, Jamaica, a parish of Cornwall County, Jamaica
- Trelawny, Pelynt (alias Trelawne), an historic manor and the historic seat of the Trelawny baronets in Cornwall
- Trelawney, Zimbabwe, a village in the province of Mashonaland West

== Other uses ==
- Trelawny (surname)
- Trelawny baronets
- Trelawny Island, an islet near Looe Island, off Cornwall
- Trelawny League, a football league based in Cornwall
- Trelawny Tigers, a motorcycle speedway team
- "The Song of the Western Men", also known as "Trelawny", a Cornish anthem about Sir Jonathan Trelawny
- Trelawny of the 'Wells', an 1898 play by Arthur Wing Pinero
  - Trelawny, a 1972 Julian Slade musical based on the Pinero play
- Trelawney (ship) – any one of several vessels of that name
- Squire Trelawney, a supporting character from Treasure Island
