= Jonathan Trelawny =

Jonathan Trelawny may refer to:

- Sir Jonathan Trelawny (High Sheriff of Cornwall), Member of Parliament for Liskeard and Cornwall
- Sir Jonathan Trelawny, 2nd Baronet (c. 1623–1681), his grandson, Member of Parliament for East Looe, Cornwall and Liskeard
- Jonathan Trelawny (MP for West Looe), of Plymouth, MP for West Looe (UK Parliament constituency) 1677–1685 and 1690–1695
- Sir Jonathan Trelawny, 3rd Baronet (1650–1721), Bishop of Bristol, Exeter and Winchester
