= Tre, Pol and Pen =

English idiom about people from Cornwall

The phrase Tre, Pol and Pen is used to describe people from or places in Cornwall, UK. The full rhyming couplet runs: By Tre Pol and Pen / Shall ye know all Cornishmen, a version of which was recorded by Richard Carew in his Survey of Cornwall, published in 1602. Many Cornish surnames and place names still retain these words as prefixes, such as the surname Trelawny and the village Polzeath. Tre in the Cornish language means a settlement or homestead; Pol, a pond, lake or well; and Pen (also Welsh and Cumbric), a hill or headland. Cornish surnames and placenames are generally pronounced with the emphasis on the second syllable.

== Examples in Cornish surnames ==
=== Tre ===
- Sir Jonathan Trelawny, 3rd Baronet
- Petroc Trelawny
- Arthur Tremayne
- Henry Trengrouse
- John Trevaskis
- Marcus Trescothick
- Sir Charles Trevelyan, 1st Baronet
- Richard Trevithick
- Richard Trevithick Tangye

=== Pol ===
- Ross Poldark, fictional character in series of the same name
- James Polkinghorne
- Richard Polwhele

=== Pen ===
- Edward William Wynne Pendarves
- David Penhaligon
- William Henry Penhaligon
- Charles Penrose
- Guy Penrose Gibson
- Dolly Pentreath
- Sir Humphrey Pengallan, character in Jamaica Inn

== Examples in Cornish place names ==
=== Tre ===
- Tregony
- Trematon
- Trethevy
- Trevone
- Treyarnon

=== Pol ===
- Polzeath
- Polperro
- Polgooth
- Polruan

=== Pen ===
- Penzance
- Penryn
- Penponds
- Pencarrow

== See also ==
- Cornish surnames
- Cornish language
