= Siege of Ostend (1745) =

Siege during the War of Austrian Succession

- Part of the War of Austrian Succession
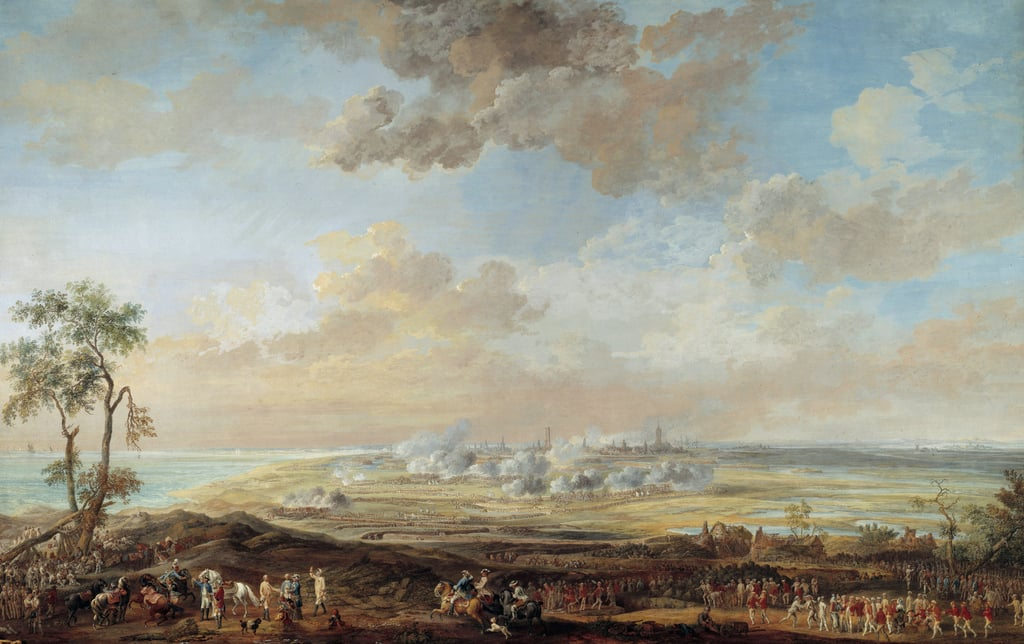
- Siege of Ostend, August 1745 by Louis Nicolas van Blarenberghe, 1783
Date	August 1745
Location	Ostend (present-day Belgium) 51°14′N 02°55′E
Result	French victory

Belligerents
France	Great Britain; Austria

Commanders and leaders
(Kingdom of France) Count of Löwendal	(Habsburg monarchy) Count Chanclos

Strength
30,000	3,600

The siege of Ostend was a two-week siege in August 1745 of the port of Ostend, then in the Austrian Netherlands, during the War of Austrian Succession. A French army commanded by the Count of Löwendal under the overall command of Marshal Saxe defeated a primarily British garrison commanded by the Austrian governor of the town, Lieutenant-General Karl Urban, Count of Chanclos.

The French Army had overrun much of the Austrian Netherlands after their success at the Battle of Fontenoy and the withdrawal of part of the British Army to deal with the Jacobite uprising at home.

Löwendal, a German who had served in a high position in the Russian Army before becoming a commander in the French Army, arrived with 30,000 troops outside of Ostend in August 1745. After a few days of fighting in the open the French began a bombardment of the town and within a week the garrison of 3,600 had surrendered. They were permitted to march out with honour and were escorted to Mons.

King Louis XV of France himself rode into the town on 3 September 1745.

== Aftermath ==
The French Army went on to take possession of nearly all of the Austrian Netherlands. They were, however, later restored to Austria under the terms of the Treaty of Aix-la-Chapelle in 1748.
