= Harry Trelawny =

British Army general

Lieutenant-General Harry Trelawny (1726 – 28 January 1800) was a British Army officer who served with the Coldstream Guards during the American Revolutionary War. He was wounded while leading a battalion of the Guards during the war and later rose to the lieutenant-colonelcy of the regiment.

Trelawny was the son of Capt. William Trelawny and his wife Mary Bisset, and the grandson of Brig-Gen. Henry Trelawny.

He served with the "Buffs" as an ensign and carried the regimental colours during the Jacobite rising of 1745. He was commissioned an ensign in the Coldstream Guards on 28 June 1746.

He was promoted lieutenant on 4 March 1752, and on 15 June of that year he married Mary Dormer (d. 22 February 1813) at Mayfair Chapel, by whom he had children, including:

- Col. Charles Trelawny (1759-1820), later Trelawny-Brereton, of Shotwick Park
- Sophia Trelawny, married John L. Freeman, of Crickmaillyn on 15 June 1801

Trelawny served with the Coldstreams during the Raid on St Malo and the Raid on Cherbourg in 1758. He became a captain on 14 March 1762. Trelawny again saw service during the American Revolutionary War, in which he led the first battalion of the regiment. He fought at the Battle of White Plains in 1776, and was promoted to a colonel in the army on 6 September 1777. He again led the first battalion at the Battle of Monmouth, where he was wounded. He was promoted to first major of the regiment on 5 May 1780, later to major-general in the army, and was promoted lieutenant-colonel of the Coldstreams on 23 November 1785. He became Governor of Landguard Fort in 1788 and retired from the Guards on 25 May 1789. On 12 October 1793, he was promoted to lieutenant-general.

He died on 28 January 1800, and was buried on 13 February at St Anne's Church, Soho.

Military offices
Preceded by Hon. Alexander Mackay	Governor of Landguard Fort; 1788–1800	Succeeded by David Dundas
