= Roger Daltrey discography =

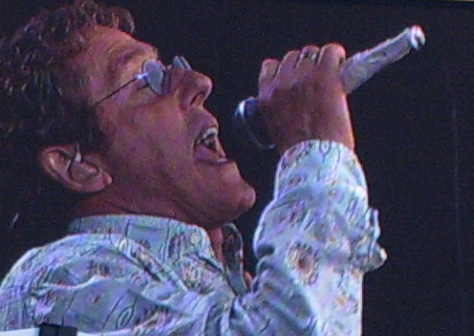
- Daltrey performing at the Live 8 concert at Hyde Park in Westminster, London, 2005
- Studio albums: 10
- Soundtrack albums: 1
- Live albums: 1
- Compilation albums: 5
- Singles: 42
- Collaborations: 1

The following is the solo discography of the English rock singer Roger Daltrey.

== Studio albums ==
Year	Title	Peak chart positions				
Year	Title	UK	AUS	NZ	SWE	US
1973	Daltrey	6	59	—	—	45
1975	Ride a Rock Horse	14	10	—	—	28
1977	One of the Boys	45	80	—	—	46
1980	McVicar	39	—	44	—	22
1984	Parting Should Be Painless	—	—	—	—	102
1985	Under a Raging Moon	52	—	—	—	42
1987	Can't Wait to See the Movie	—	—	—	41	—
1992	Rocks in the Head	—	—	—	—	—
2014	Going Back Home (with Wilko Johnson)	3	—	—	—	—
2018	As Long as I Have You	8	—	—	—	194
"—" denotes releases that did not chart

== Live albums ==
Year	Title	Peak chart positions
Year	Title	UK
1994	A Celebration: The Music of Pete Townshend and The Who	—
2019	The Who's Tommy Orchestral	100

== Compilation albums ==
Year	Title	Peak chart positions
Year	Title	US
1981	The Best of Roger Daltrey / Best Bits	185
1991	Best of Rockers & Ballads	—
1997	Martyrs & Madmen: The Best of Roger Daltrey	—
1998	Anthology	—
2005	Moonlighting: The Anthology	—

== Singles ==
=== As lead artist ===
Year	Title	Peak chart positions				Album
Year	Title	UK	AUS	US	US Rock	Album
1973	"Giving It All Away"	5	58	83	—	Daltrey
1973	"Thinking"	61	—	—	—	Daltrey
1973	"It's a Hard Life"	—	—	—	—	Daltrey
1973	"One Man Band"	—	—	—		Daltrey
1975	"(Come and) Get Your Love"	—	46	68	—	Ride a Rock Horse
1975	"Walking the Dog"	52	77	—	—	Ride a Rock Horse
1975	"Oceans Away"	—	—	—	—	Ride a Rock Horse
1975	"Love's Dream"	—	—	—	—	Lisztomania (soundtrack)
1975	"Peace at Last" [Japan-only]	—	—	—	—	Lisztomania (soundtrack)
1977	"Written on the Wind"	46	—	—	—	One of the Boys
1977	"Avenging Annie"	—	—	88	—	One of the Boys
1977	"One of the Boys"	—	—	—	—	One of the Boys
1977	"Say It Ain't So, Joe"	—	—	—		One of the Boys
1978	"Leon"	—	—	—	—	One of the Boys
1980	"Free Me"	39	66	53	—	McVicar
1980	"Without Your Love"	55	—	20	—	McVicar
1980	"Bitter and Twisted"	—	—	—	—	McVicar
1980	"Waiting for a Friend"	—	—	104	—	McVicar
1981	"White City Lights"	—	—	—	—	McVicar
1982	"Martyrs and Madmen"	—	—	—	38	Best Bits
1982	"Treachery" [Spain-only]	—	—	—	—	Best Bits
1982	"Say It Ain't So, Joe" [Promo/re-release]	—	—	—	41	Best Bits
1984	"Walking in My Sleep"	56	—	62	4	Parting Should Be Painless
1984	"Parting Should Be Painless"	—	—	—	—	Parting Should Be Painless
1984	"Would a Stranger Do"	—	—	—	—	Parting Should Be Painless
1985	"After the Fire"	50	60	48	3	Under a Raging Moon
1985	"Let Me Down Easy"	—	—	86	11	Under a Raging Moon
1986	"Under a Raging Moon"	43	—	—	10	Under a Raging Moon
1986	"The Pride You Hide"	92	—	—	—	Under a Raging Moon
1986	"Move Better in the Night" [Promo-only]	—	—	—	—	Under a Raging Moon
1986	"Quicksilver Lightning"	—	—	—	11	Quicksilver (soundtrack)
1987	"Don't Let the Sun Go Down on Me"	—	—	—	—	The Lost Boys (soundtrack)
1987	"Hearts of Fire"	88	—	—	—	Can't Wait to See the Movie
1987	"Take Me Home"	—	—	—	46	Can't Wait to See the Movie
1992	"Behind Blue Eyes" [Promo-only] (The Chieftains with Roger Daltrey)	—	—	—	—	An Irish Evening: Live at the Grand Opera House, Belfast (The Chieftains)
1992	"Days of Light"	—	—	—	6	Rocks in the Head
1994	"Pinball Wizard"	—	—	—	—	A Celebration: The Music of Pete Townshend and The Who
1998	"God Bless Us Everyone" [Promo-only] (Roger Daltrey with the Boys Choir of Harlem)	—	—	—	—	Non-album single
2002	"Child of Mine" [Promo-only] (Roger Daltrey featuring G Tom Mac)	—	—	—	—	The Banger Sisters (soundtrack)
2005	"My Generation" (Roger Daltrey & McFly)	—	—	—	—	Non-album single
2014	"I Keep It to Myself" [Promo-only] (Roger Daltrey with Wilko Johnson)	140	—	—	—	Going Back Home
"—" denotes releases that did not chart

=== As featured artist ===
Year	Title	Peak chart positions					Album
Year	Title	UK	BEL (FL)	IRE	NZ	SWI	Album
1991	"Rock and Roll" (McEnroe & Cash with the Full Metal Rackets [feat Daltrey])	66	—	—	—	—	Non-album single
2017	"Bridge over Troubled Water" (as part of Artists for Grenfell)	1	53	25	— (Note: "Bridge over Troubled Water" did not enter the NZ Top 40 Singles Chart, but peaked at number four on the NZ Heatseekers Singles Chart.)	28	Non-album single

== Other appearances ==
Year	Contribution	Album
1986	"Quicksilver Lightning"	Quicksilver
1987	"Don't Let the Sun Go Down on Me"	The Lost Boys
1999	"No More Mr. Nice Guy" (with Carmine Appice, Mike Inez, Bob Kulick, & Slash)	Humanary Stew: A Tribute to Alice Cooper
2002	"Child of Mine"	The Banger Sisters
2014	"Helter Skelter"	The Art of McCartney

=== Guest appearances ===
Year	Album	Contribution
1972	Tommy	Guest vocals, performing with the London Symphony Orchestra as conducted by David Measham
1975	Lisztomania	Daltrey worked with Rick Wakeman and others on the soundtrack for Lisztomania; he wrote the lyrics for "Love's Dream", "Orpheus Song", "Peace at Last", and performed "Love's Dream", "Orpheus Song", "Funerailles", and "Peace at Last"
1990	Mack the Knife	Performed as the Street Singer the songs "Mack the Knife" and "Mack the Knife Reprise"
1996	The Wizard of Oz in Concert	Performed as the Tin Woodman and sang lead on "If I Only Had a Heart", as well as supporting vocals in other songs
1999	British Rock Symphony	Daltrey sings Led Zeppelin's "Kashmir" with Ann Wilson and The Beatles' "Let It Be" with Simon Townshend
2010	The Hunting of the Snark	Collaborated with Art Garfunkel, Julian Lennon, Cliff Richard and others

Unreleased soundtrack contributions

- "House of the Rising Sun" for the soundtrack of the film Best
