= Moonlighting: The Anthology =

Compilation album by Roger Daltrey
- Released: 7 February 2005
- Genre: Rock; soft rock
- Label: Sanctuary

Roger Daltrey chronology
Martyrs and Madmen (1997)	Moonlighting: The Anthology (2005)	Going Back Home (2014)

Professional ratings
Review scores
Source	Rating
AllMusic	3/5 stars

Moonlighting: The Anthology is a compilation album released by the English rock singer Roger Daltrey on 7 February 2005. The collection includes tracks from various projects throughout his career, such as stage and film appearances, as well as a good sampling of songs from his discography. It was released on the Sanctuary label in the UK and also included "A Second Out," a previously unreleased song written by Daltrey and Steve McEwan of the band UnAmerican.

The album was reissued as Gold, with a slightly different track listing, as part of the album series of the same name, on 10 October 2006.

== Track listing ==
Disc 1

1. "One Man Band" (Courtney, Leo Sayer) 3:52
2. "The Way of the World" (Courtney, Adam Faith) 3:16
3. "Thinking" (Courtney, Sayer) 4:25
4. "There Is Love" (Courtney, Sayer) 4:36
5. "Giving it All Away" (Courtney, Sayer) 3:34
6. "(Come And) Get Your Love" (Russ Ballard) 3:44
7. "The World Over" (Paul Korda) 3:08
8. "Proud" (Ballard) 4:51
9. "Dear John" (Courtney) 3:48
10. "Avenging Annie" (Andy Pratt) 4:32
11. "One of the Boys" (Steve Gibbons) 2:46
12. "Martyrs and Madmen" (Steve Swindells) 4:19
13. "Say It Ain't So, Joe" (Murray Head) 4:16
14. "Bitter and Twisted" (Swindells) 4:07
15. "Free Me" (Ballard) 3:59
16. "Without Your Love" (Billy Nicholls) 3:19
17. "Waiting for a Friend" (Nicholls) 3:24
18. "Parting Would Be Painless" (Kit Hain) 3:42
19. "After the Fire" (Pete Townshend) 4:37
20. "Under a Raging Moon" (Downes, Parr) 5:34

Disc 2

1. "Behind Blue Eyes" (Live) (Townshend) 2:29
2. "Won't Get Fooled Again" (Live) (Townshend) 7:52
3. "Quicksilver Lightning" (Moroder, Pitchford) 4:43
4. "Lover's Storm" (Kelly, Usher) 3:54
5. "Mack the Knife" (Blitzstein, Bertolt Brecht, Kurt Weill) 4:49
6. "The Pig Must Die" (Mike Batt) 4:30
7. "Don't Let the Sun Go Down on Me" (Elton John, Bernie Taupin) 6:12
8. "Rock and Roll" (John Bonham, John Paul Jones, Jimmy Page, Robert Plant) 3:39
9. "Who's Gonna Walk On Water" (MacMahon) 4:45
10. "Love Is" (Byrd, Daltrey, Katz, MacMahon) 4:09
11. "Blues Man's Road" (Byrd, MacMahon) 4:03
12. "Baba O'Riley" (Live) (Townshend) 3:23
13. "Pinball Wizard" (Live) (Townshend) 3:43
14. "The Real Me" (Live) (Townshend) 4:30
15. "Child of Mine" (Daltrey, MacMahon) 4:02
16. "Born to Run" (Live) (Bruce Springsteen) 5:12
17. "A Second Out" (Daltrey, McEwan)

In 2006 reissue as Gold, "Quicksilver Lightning," "Mack the Knife," "Don't Let the Sun Go Down on Me," and "Rock and Roll" were removed, "After the Fire" and "Under a Raging Moon", formerly the last two tracks of Disc 1, were shifted to the beginning of Disc 2, and "The Pride You Hide" (Alan Dalgleish, Nicky Tesco, Daltrey; 4:33) was added as track 3.
