= Martyrs & Madmen: The Best of Roger Daltrey =

Greatest hits album by Roger Daltrey
- Released: 1997
- Genres: Rock; soft rock
- Label: Rhino

Roger Daltrey chronology
A Celebration: The Music of Pete Townshend and The Who (1994)	Martyrs & Madmen: The Best of Roger Daltrey (1997)	Anthology (1998)

Professional ratings
Review scores
Source	Rating
AllMusic	4.5/5 stars

Martyrs & Madmen: The Best of Roger Daltrey is a compilation album of Roger Daltrey recordings issued in 1997. The CD was released on Rhino Records R2 72846 USA.

== Track listing ==
1. "One Man Band" (David Courtney, Leo Sayer) – 3:53
2. "It's a Hard Life" (Courtney, Sayer) – 3:39
3. "Giving it All Away" (Courtney, Sayer) – 3:26
4. "Thinking" (Courtney, Sayer) – 4:25
5. "World Over" (Paul Korda) – 3:13
6. "Oceans Away" (Goodhand-Tait) – 3:19
7. "One of the Boys" (Gibbons) – 2:46
8. "Avenging Annie" (Pratt) 4:33
9. "Say It Ain't So, Joe" (Murray Head) – 4:20
10. "Parade" (Goodhand-Tait) – 3:44
11. "Free Me" (Russ Ballard) – 4:00
12. "Without Your Love" (Billy Nicholls) – 3:18
13. "Waiting for a Friend" (Nicholls) – 3:25
14. "Walking in My Sleep" (Adey, Green) – 3:28
15. "Parting Should Be Painless" (Kit Hain) – 3:43
16. "After the Fire" (Pete Townshend) – 4:37
17. "Let Me Down Easy" (Bryan Adams, Jim Vallance) – 4:10
18. "The Pride You Hide" (Dalgleish, Daltrey, Tesco) – 4:33
19. "Under a Raging Moon" [Single Version] (Downes, Parr) – 4:34
20. "Lover's Storm" (Kelly, Usher) – 3:53
