= Quicksilver (soundtrack) =

Studio album by Various Artists
- Released: 1986
- Genres: Rock; pop rock
- Length: 40:04
- Label: Atlantic
- Producers: Alan Shacklock; Giorgio Moroder; Tony Banks; Peter Frampton; Ray Parker Jr.; Richard James Burgess; Gary Katz; Peter Solley; John Parr; Thomas Newman; Greg Mathieson; John Vigran

Singles from Quicksilver
- 1. "Quicksilver Lightning" Released: 1986; 2. "One Sunny Day/Dueling Bikes from Quicksilver" Released: 1986

Professional ratings
Review scores
Source	Rating
AllMusic	(Not rated)

Quicksilver: Original Motion Picture Soundtrack is the soundtrack for the American film, Quicksilver, which was released in 1986, and stars Kevin Bacon, Jami Gertz, Paul Rodriguez, Louie Anderson, Laurence Fishburne and Rudy Ramos.

The film's theme song is "Quicksilver Lightning" which is written by Giorgio Moroder and Dean Pitchford, And is Performed by The Who's lead singer, Roger Daltrey, it was a minor hit on the rock charts, reaching number 11. The film score was composed by Tony Banks, of Genesis fame. Other music is contributed by performers such as Ray Parker Jr. and Peter Frampton.

A version of "The Motown Song" was covered by Rod Stewart in 1991, and included on his sixteenth solo album, Vagabond Heart, and released as a single.

== Track listings ==
No.	Title	Performed by	Length
1.	"Quicksilver Lightning"	Roger Daltrey	4:45
2.	"Casual Thing"	Fiona	3:42
3.	"Nothing At All"	Peter Frampton	4:10
4.	"Shortcut to Somewhere"	Fish and Tony Banks	3:35
5.	"Love Song from Quicksilver (Through the Night)"	John Parr and Marilyn Martin	4:04
6.	"One Sunny Day/Dueling Bikes from Quicksilver"	Ray Parker Jr. and Helen Terry	4:04
7.	"The Motown Song"	Larry John McNally	3:50
8.	"Suite Streets from Quicksilver"	Thomas Newman	2:39
9.	"Quicksilver Suite I Rebirth The Gypsy"	Tony Banks	6:31
10.	"Quicksilver Suite II Crash Landing"	Tony Banks	2:44

== Personnel ==
Engineering

- Andy Jackson - Engineer
- David Leonard - Engineer
- Tim Boyle - Engineer
- Dave Concors - Engineer
- Will Gosling - Engineer
- Trevor Hallesy - Engineer
- Steve Hallquist - Engineer
- Daniel Lazerus - Engineer
- Brian Tench - Engineer
- John Vigran - Engineer
- Mark Wallis - Engineer
- David Thoener - Mixing
- Thomas Newman - Sound Effects
- George Budd - Sound Effects
- Bob Holmes - Creative Assistance
- Gary LeMel - Creative Assistance
- Judy Ross - Film Music Coordinator
- Elliot Lurie - Music Supervisor
- Becky Mancuso - Music Supervisor
- Barry Diament - Mastering
- Wally Traugott - Mastering

Album cover art

- Paul Jasmin - Album cover photography

== Charts ==
Album - Billboard (North America)

Year	Chart	Position
1986	Billboard 200	140
