= Quicksilver Lightning =

Single by Roger Daltrey

from the album Quicksilver: Original Motion Picture Soundtrack
- B-side: "Love Me like You Do"
- Released: April 1986
- Recorded: 1985 – 1986
- Genre: Pop rock
- Length: 4:46
- Label: Atlantic – 7-89457
- Songwriters: Giorgio Moroder; Dean Pitchford
- Producers: Alan Shacklock; Giorgio Moroder

Roger Daltrey singles chronology
"The Pride You Hide" (1986)	"Quicksilver Lightning" (1986)	"Take Me Home" (1987)

Music video
- "Quicksilver Lightning" on YouTube

"Quicksilver Lightning" is a song by Roger Daltrey, who at the time was the former lead vocalist of the Who. The track is credited as being written by Dean Pitchford and being composed by Giorgio Moroder. The track is the theme tune for the American drama film Quicksilver (1986) starring Kevin Bacon, Jami Gertz, Paul Rodriguez, Louie Anderson, Laurence Fishburne and Rudy Ramos. The film was directed by Thomas Michael Donnelly. The film went quite unnoticed, so both the song and the film are not easily remembered.

== Critical reception ==
Cashbox said that the song gives "one of rock's enduring great voices a solid tune."

The song was released as a single in April 1986 and reached No. 11 on the Billboard Album Rock Tracks chart.

== Promotional film ==
A large portion of the music video was filmed in San Francisco, California, with parts of the video featuring Daltrey recording the song in a studio. The video begins with Daltrey in a taxi, looking at documents called "Quicksilver", while Jack Casey (Kevin Bacon) rides behind him. He gets out of the cab and walks into a recording studio, then begins singing the song. The video cuts between Daltrey singing and scenes from the film.

== Releases ==
The song was later released as the B-side to the single, "Hearts of Fire" from Daltrey's seventh solo studio album Can't Wait to See the Movie, in 1987.

== B-side ==
The B-side "Love Me Like You Do", written by Andy Nye, was included as track six on Daltrey's sixth solo studio album, Under a Raging Moon (1985), but only on the CD and cassette versions, not the record version.

== Compilation appearance ==
Other than the original single release, the track is only available on the 2005 compilation album, Moonlighting: The Anthology, released by Sanctuary Records.

== Chart performance ==
A promotional poster for the single.

Singles – Billboard Singles (North America)

Chart (1986)	Peak position
US Album Rock Tracks	11

== See also ==
- Roger Daltrey discography
