= Under a Raging Moon =

Under a Raging Moon may refer to:

- Under a Raging Moon (album), a 1985 album by Roger Daltrey
- "Under a Raging Moon" (song), a song by Roger Daltrey
