= Under a Raging Moon (album) =

Studio album by Roger Daltrey
- Released: September 1985
- Studios: RAK (London); Odyssey (London)
- Genres: Rock; pop rock; hard rock
- Length: 43:41
- Labels: 10; Atlantic
- Producer: Alan Shacklock

Roger Daltrey chronology
Parting Should Be Painless (1984)	Under a Raging Moon (1985)	Can't Wait to See the Movie (1987)

Singles from Under a Raging Moon
- 1. "After the Fire" Released: September 1985; 2. "Let Me Down Easy" Released: November 1985; 3. "Under a Raging Moon" Released: 24 February 1986; 4. "The Pride You Hide" Released: 17 April 1986

Under a Raging Moon is the sixth solo studio album by the English rock singer Roger Daltrey, released in September 1985 by 10 Records in Europe, and Atlantic Records in the US. The album peaked at No. 42 on the US Billboard 200, and the single "After the Fire", written by Pete Townshend of the Who, peaked at No. 48 on the US Billboard Hot 100. It includes a tribute to Keith Moon, former drummer of the Who who had died in 1978, on the title track "Under a Raging Moon", which peaked at No. 43 on the UK singles chart. In Canada, the album peaked at No. 33 on the RPM chart, and "After the Fire" peaked at No. 53.

Under a Raging Moon was produced by Alan Shacklock, and recorded at the studios RAK and Odyssey in London. When the album was released on CD and cassette, it included the bonus track "Love Me Like You Do", written by Andy Nye.

== Background ==
"After the Fire" was the only song written by fellow Who member Pete Townshend for a Daltrey solo studio album. It was initially planned to be played by the Who at Live Aid in July 1985 and is about the 1983–1985 famine in Ethiopia. However, the band committed at the last minute and were unable to rehearse the song, so it was given to Daltrey to record for Under a Raging Moon, with all royalties given to the Band Aid Trust. Townshend explained that it was written explicitly for Live Aid and compares the situation in Africa to a fire and that the concert would be figuratively putting it out. But despite this, it will always still "smolder and burn".

Regular Daltrey collaborator Russ Ballard contributed "Breaking Down Paradise", whilst playing guitar and performing harmony vocals on the track.

"The Pride You Hide" was released as a limited edition gatefold double pack single, which featured the exclusive B-side "Breakout", and live tracks including a cover version of the Who's 1967 single "Pictures of Lily" and a version of "Don't Talk to Strangers".

"Move Better in the Night" was released as a promotional single in the US. It was prominently featured in a popular late-1980s Michelob beer commercial as part of their "The Night Belongs to Michelob" ad campaign.

The tracks "Let Me Down Easy" and "Rebel" were written by the Canadians Bryan Adams and Jim Vallance. Adams appears in the original music video for the former, despite not appearing on the studio recordings for either track. This collaboration came about due to Vicki Russell, daughter of film director Ken Russell, whom was dating Adams at the time – arranging for Daltrey, and Adams to meet for dinner, and when Daltrey mentioned that he was recording a solo studio album, Adams offered to write him a song, before contributing these two for him with Vallance.

According Vallance "Rebel" is about small-town England, as best they could imagine it if, for example, Daltrey had worked in a shop or a factory and not become famous. It is also about finding the courage to change, to leave behind all that's familiar. It was also their best attempt at not writing a "boy-girl" song, and was later recorded by Adams on his fifth studio album Into the Fire. "Let Me Down Easy" was originally written for Stevie Nicks, but it's not known if she had ever listened to it. Vallance was happy with Daltrey's performance.

As with Daltrey's previous studio album Parting Should Be Painless (1984), he covered a Kit Hain song in "Fallen Angel".

"It Don't Satisfy Me" is the shortest track on the album, and was co-written by producer Alan Shacklock, and Daltrey. As with "Move Better in the Night" it features a harmonica solo by Mark Feltham.

The album's final and title track "Under a Raging Moon" was written by John Parr (of "St. Elmo's Fire (Man in Motion)" fame) and Julia Downes. It was said that John Entwistle had wanted to perform this song with the Who instead of "Won't Get Fooled Again" at Live Aid, but Pete Townshend disagreed so Entwistle decided to record his own version on his live solo album Left for Live (1999) as a further tribute to Moon.

The album featured Ringo Starr of the Beatles' son Zak Starkey playing drums; this was Starkey's second studio album that he had worked on, the other being Sun City released in the same year by the protest group Artists United Against Apartheid. It was also his first work with a Who member, working around the same time with John Entwistle on The Rock (1996), originally planned for release in 1986. Starkey went on to tour and record with the Who from 1996 to 2025.

For the first time since his third solo studio album One of the Boys (1977), Daltrey is credited as a co-writer on four tracks: "Don't Talk to Strangers", "The Pride You Hide", "Move Better in the Night" and "It Don't Satisfy Me", this would be the most co-writes that he'd contribute until his eighth solo studio album Rocks in the Head (1992).

Daltrey later recalled "That was the album I really wanted to make ... it got great airplay and sold an awful lot."

== Mini-tour ==
Daltrey went on a brief North American mini-tour in December 1985 in support of Under a Raging Moon. It featured a core backing band of keyboardist Alan Shacklock, guitarists Robbie McIntosh and Rick Derringer, bassist John Siegler, and drummers Mark Brzezicki and Alan Gratzer. Big Country were the opening act for several of these shows.

The tour primarily ran from 2 December to 12 December, with notable dates being at the Capitol Theatre in Passaic, New Jersey, DAR Constitution Hall in Washington, D.C., the Orpheum Theater in Boston, and New York City's Madison Square Garden.

During the Madison Square Garden concert, Bryan Adams and John Parr guested on the songs that they had written for Under a Raging Moon, and Who member John Entwistle sang "Twist and Shout" during the encore, with Yoko Ono and Sean Lennon also appearing onstage.

== Critical reception ==
Professional ratings
Review scores
Source	Rating
AllMusic	2.5/5 stars
Kerrang!	4.5/5 stars
Rolling Stone	(mixed)

Mike DeGagne of AllMusic wrote about the title track: "Daltrey's thunderous but passionate ode to his former friend and drummer Keith Moon is a fervent downpour of frustration that can be truly felt inside every line of the song." DeGagne erroneously credits the entire drum solo section to Mark Brzezicki: He plays one of the seven solos and the primary drum part throughout the rest of the track. Zak Starkey accompanies Brzezicki in a drums duet following the solos and through the song's fadeout.

== Track listing ==
No.	Title	Writer(s)	Length
1.	"After the Fire"	Pete Townshend	4:36
2.	"Don't Talk to Strangers"	Julia Downes; Kris Ryder; Roger Daltrey	4:13
3.	"Breaking Down Paradise"	Russ Ballard	4:07
4.	"The Pride You Hide"	Alan Dalgleish; Daltrey; Nicky Tesco	4:33
5.	"Move Better in the Night"	Chris Thompson; Stevie Lange; Robbie McIntosh; Daltrey	3:58
6.	"Love Me Like You Do" (CD and cassette versions only)	Andy Nye	6:05
7.	"Let Me Down Easy"	Bryan Adams; Jim Vallance	4:08
8.	"Fallen Angel"	Kit Hain	4:29
9.	"It Don't Satisfy Me"	Alan Shacklock; Daltrey	3:14
10.	"Rebel"	Adams; Vallance	4:20
11.	"Under a Raging Moon"	Downes; John Parr	6:42
Total length:			43:41

- The track "Love Me Like You Do" was not included on the LP release, and was later re-released as the B-side to Daltrey's 1986 single, "Quicksilver Lightning", the theme song to the American drama film Quicksilver.

== Personnel ==
Musicians

- Roger Daltrey – lead vocals (all tracks), harmony vocals (track 1), backing vocals (track 11)
- Mark Brzezicki – drums (all tracks), triangle and cabasa (track 2), percussion (track 3)
- Tony Butler – bass (track 1)
- Robbie McIntosh – guitars (tracks 1–6, 8–11), Strat-solo (track 2), solo (tracks 6, 7), slide solo (track 10)
- Nick Glennie-Smith – keyboards (tracks 1–3, 8, 11), sequencing (tracks 2, 11), Emulator (tracks 3–5), Hammond organ (track 7)
- John Siegler – bass (tracks 2–11)
- Mark Feltham – harmonica (tracks 5, 9)
- Alan Shacklock – piano (tracks 1, 6, 10), keyboards (tracks 2, 3, 11), sequencing (tracks 2, 11), Emulator (track 3), percussion (track 4), Hammond organ (tracks 6, 10), Rhodes piano (track 6), tambourine (track 7), sampling (track 8), acoustic guitar and sequencer (track 10), Fairlight CMI (track 11)
- Bruce Watson – EBow (track 1)
- Russ Ballard – guitar and harmony vocals (track 3)
- Mark Williamson – harmony vocals (tracks 2, 6), backing vocals (tracks 3–5, 7, 8, 11)
- John Payne – backing vocals (tracks 3–5, 7, 8, 11)
- Annie McCaig – backing vocals (tracks 3–5, 7, 8, 11)
- John Parr – backing vocals (track 11)
- Steve Rance – Fairlight CMI (track 11)
- On track 11, drummers in order of performance:
  - Martin Chambers
  - Roger Taylor (Queen drummer)
  - Cozy Powell
  - Stewart Copeland
  - Zak Starkey
  - Carl Palmer
  - Mark Brzezicki
  - Mark Brzezicki and Zak Starkey – outro

Technical

- Alan Shacklock – producer; mixing engineer
- Will Gosling – engineer
- Chris Dickie – assistant engineer
- Dana Gorbun – assistant engineer
- Mark Wallis – mixing engineer
- Roger Dobson – assistant mixing engineer
- Bob Ludwig – mastering engineer
- Graham Hughes – sleeve concept, photography

== Charts ==
Chart (1985–1986)	Peak position
Canada Top Albums/CDs (RPM)	33
UK Albums (Official Charts)	52
US Billboard 200	42

== See also ==
- Roger Daltrey discography
