= Love Me Like You Do (disambiguation) =

"Love Me like You Do" is a 2015 song by Ellie Goulding.

Love Me like You Do may also refer to:

- "Love Me like You Do" (1986), the B-side to Roger Daltrey's single "Quicksilver Lightning"
- "Love Me like You Do" (1987), a song from Anita Pointer's album Love for What It Is
- "Love Me like You Do" (2012), a bonus track from Justin Bieber's album Believe
- Love Me like You Do (2014), the British release title of the film Jackie & Ryan

== See also ==
- "Love Me Like You", a 2015 song by Little Mix
