= Julia Downes =

Songwriter, musician and producer

Julia Downes is a songwriter, musician and producer whose songs have appeared on albums by Roger Daltrey, Meat Loaf, Sheena Easton, John Parr, Saga, and Michael Ball.

In 1983, she released her debut studio album Let Sleeping Dogs Lie, which includes her own version of her song "Don't Talk to Strangers", later recorded by Roger Daltrey.

She produced Annabella Lwin's debut solo studio album Fever (1986) and played keyboards on Stephan Eicher's album Silence (1998). She also edited the 2012 book, Women Make Noise: Girl Bands from Motown to the Modern.

She has subsequently been known as Julia Taylor-Stanley, under which name she also co-wrote "Voice of the Heart" for Diana Ross.

== List of songs written or co-written ==
1. "Under a Raging Moon" (by Roger Daltrey on album Under a Raging Moon)
2. "Don't Talk to Strangers" (by Roger Daltrey on album Under a Raging Moon)
3. "Don't Leave Your Mark on Me" (by Meat Loaf on album Bad Attitude)
4. "Don't Leave Your Mark on Me [Mark 2]" (by John Parr on album Running the Endless Mile)
5. "Story Still Remains the Same [Vices]" (by John Parr on album Running the Endless Mile)
6. "Machinery" (by Sheena Easton on album Madness, Money & Music)
