= Take Me Home (Roger Daltrey song) =

Single by Roger Daltrey

from the album Can't Wait to See the Movie
- A-side: "Take Me Home" (vocal edit)
- B-side: "Take Me Home" (LP version)
- Released: 4 June 1987
- Length: 5:45
- Label: Atlantic
- Songwriters: Axel Bauer; Roger Daltrey; Michel Eli; Nigel Hinton
- Producers: Alan Shacklock; David Foster; Jimmy Scott; Chas Sandford

Roger Daltrey singles chronology
"Quicksilver Lightning" (1986)	"Take Me Home" (1987)	"Days of Light" (1992)

Official audio
- "Take Me Home" on YouTube

"Take Me Home" is a song by the English rock singer Roger Daltrey, the lead vocalist of the Who. The single was released exclusively in the US on 4 June 1987 by Atlantic Records, and is an adaptation of "Cargo" (which was a hit in France in 1984), recorded by the French rock singer Axel Bauer, written by Bauer with Michel Eli.

Daltrey's recording, with English lyrics, was credited to Bauer, Eli, Daltrey and Nigel Hinton. It was released on his seventh solo studio album Can't Wait to See the Movie (1987). The single peaked at No. 46 on the US Billboard Mainstream Rock Chart.

== Chart performance ==
Chart	Peak position
US Billboard Mainstream Rock Chart	46
