= Wheels on the Bus =

(The) Wheels on the Bus may refer to:

- "The Wheels on the Bus", a children's song
- The Wheels on the Bus (video series), educational series for children
- "Wheels on the Bus", a 2019 song by Melanie Martinez from her album K-12
- Wheels On the Bus, a 1991 moving-parts children's picture book by Paul O. Zelinsky
