= A Celebration: The Music of Pete Townshend and The Who =

- Cover to the Compact Disc edition of the album

Live album by Roger Daltrey
- Released: 1994
- Recorded: 23–24 February 1994
- Venue: Carnegie Hall, New York City
- Genre: Rock
- Label: Continuum
- Producer: Richard Flanzer and Bob Ezrin

Roger Daltrey chronology
Rocks in the Head (1992)	A Celebration: The Music of Pete Townshend and The Who (1994)	Martyrs and Madmen (1997)

Video cover

Professional ratings
Review scores
Source	Rating
AllMusic	3/5 stars

A Celebration: The Music of Pete Townshend and The Who, also known as Daltrey Sings Townshend, is a music event and a later live album by the English rock singer Roger Daltrey of the Who documenting a two-night concert at Carnegie Hall in New York City, February 1994.

== Overview ==
The music event broke Carnegie Hall's two-day box office gross record, and was the fastest sell-out in the historic venue's history. The concert also raised money for Columbia Presbyterian Babies Hospital. This event was produced by Richard Flanzer and Roger Daltrey in celebration of Daltrey's 50th birthday. The Who's music was arranged for orchestra by Michael Kamen, who directed The Juilliard Orchestra for the event. Pete Townshend, John Entwistle, Eddie Vedder, Sinéad O'Connor, Lou Reed, David Sanborn, Alice Cooper, Linda Perry, the Chieftains and others performed as special guests.

The event was followed by a major tour of the same name including John Entwistle on bass, Zak Starkey on drums and Simon Townshend on guitar. Although the tour was considered an artistic success, it didn't earn enough profit in several cities to cover high expenses, so it was concluded early.

In 1994, Daltrey's manager, Richard Flanzer, made a $450,000 deal to record and film the two nights of Carnegie Hall performances with Tim Brack (President of Continuum Records) with direction credited to Michael Lindsay-Hogg. The CD was released on Continuum 19402 USA. Edited by Alan Miller, a DVD was released 14 July 1998. The vocal contribution of Sinéad O'Connor on "Baba O'Riley" and "After the Fire" were edited from the CD, but included on the DVD.

== Track listing ==
All songs were written by Pete Townshend. The track listing for the CD and video is as follows:

1. Overture (7:26)
2. Pinball Wizard (3:19)
3. Imagine a Man (4:29)
4. Doctor Jimmy (6:15)
5. The Song Is Over (5:43)
6. The Real Me (4:42)
7. Baba O'Riley (6:42)
8. After the Fire (5:12)
9. 5:15 (5:58)
10. The Sea Refuses No River (6:11)
11. Who Are You (6:25)
12. Won't Get Fooled Again (8:07)

"Overture" is not the Who song from Tommy, but a special medley for these concerts and subsequent tour, consisting of "A Little Is Enough", "Love Reign, o'er Me", "Rough Boys", "Sparks", "Dr. Jimmy" ("Is It Me?" section), "Baba O'Riley", "Who Are You", "Quadrophenia" ("Helpless Dancer" theme), and "See Me, Feel Me"

== Personnel ==
=== Band ===
- Roger Daltrey – vocals
- John "Rabbit" Bundrick – keyboards
- Jon Carin – guitar, keyboards, backing vocals
- Jody Linscott – percussion
- Pino Palladino – bass
- Phil Palmer – guitar
- Simon Phillips – drums
- Billy Nicholls – backing vocals
- Cleveland Watkiss – backing vocals
- Michael Kamen – arranger, conductor
- The Juilliard Orchestra – orchestra

=== Guest stars ===
- Linda Perry – vocals on "Doctor Jimmy"
- John Entwistle – bass on "The Real Me"
- The Chieftains – bodhrán, bones, fiddle, flute, Irish harp, oboe, tin whistle, Uilleann pipes on "Baba O'Riley" and "After the Fire"
- David Sanborn – saxophone on "5:15"
- Pete Townshend – guitar and vocals on "Who Are You"

=== Technical ===
- Produced by Bob Ezrin
- Recorded by Thom Panunzio and Bob Ezrin
- Mixed by Thom Panunzio, Bob Ezrin, Martin Horenburg
- Production and technical supervision: Robert (Ringo) Hrycyna
- Recorded on Remote Recording's Silver Truck with David Hewitt

== See also ==
- Roger Daltrey discography
