= Days of Light =

Days of Light may refer to:

- Days of Light (song), a song by Roger Daltrey
- Days of Light (film), a 2019 internationally co-produced anthology thriller drama film
