= The Who's Tommy Orchestral =

Live album by Roger Daltrey
- Released: 14 June 2019
- Recorded: July 2018; February 2019
- Venue: Bethel, New York, US; Budapest, Hungary
- Genre: Rock, classical
- Length: 69:19
- Label: Polydor
- Producer: Roger Daltrey and Keith Levenson

The Who's Tommy Orchestral is a live album by English rock singer Roger Daltrey, performing The Who's 1969 album Tommy alongside members of The Who touring band and a symphony orchestra conducted by Keith Levenson. It was recorded in July 2018 in Bethel, New York, at the site of the original Woodstock festival, during a US tour of the concert. Later, in February 2019, Levenson directed and recorded the Budapest Scoring Orchestra in Budapest with new arrangements from David Campbell, to add a new orchestral backing to the album.

The album was released by Polydor on 14 June 2019 to mark the 50th anniversary of the original recording, as a vinyl 2-LP set and a single CD. The track list presents the original studio album almost exactly, with the only changes being it missing "Underture", and a slightly different order. According to Daltrey "[the album is] played as a structured piece of music that is written and respected just as we respect the great composers of the past". The cover was designed by Richard Evans.

== Track listing ==
All songs written by Pete Townshend, except where noted.

Standard Edition CD & 2-LP vinyl set
No.	Title	Length
1.	"Overture"	05:42
2.	"It's A Boy"	00:40
3.	"1921"	02:56
4.	"Amazing Journey"	05:09
5.	"Sparks"	02:12
6.	"Eyesight to the Blind (The Hawker)" (Sonny Boy Williamson II)	02:21
7.	"Christmas"	04:40
8.	"Cousin Kevin" (John Entwistle)	03:51
9.	"The Acid Queen"	03:50
10.	"Do You Think It's Alright?"	00:25
11.	"Fiddle About" (John Entwistle)	01:40
12.	"Pinball Wizard"	03:18
13.	"There's A Doctor"	00:24
14.	"Go to the Mirror!"	03:51
15.	"Tommy, Can You Hear Me?"	01:39
16.	"Smash The Mirror"	01:25
17.	"Refrain - It's A Boy"	00:29
18.	"I'm Free"	02:46
19.	"Miracle Cure"	00:13
20.	"Sensation"	03:07
21.	"Sally Simpson / Gospel Piano Interlude"	04:53
22.	"Welcome"	04:04
23.	"Tommy's Holiday Camp" (Keith Moon)	01:11
24.	"We're Not Gonna Take It"	08:33
Total length:		69:19

== Charts ==
Chart (2019)	Peak position
US Top Classical Albums (Billboard)	1
UK Albums (OCC)	100

== Personnel ==
=== Band ===
- Roger Daltrey – vocals, producer
- Simon Townshend – guitar, vocals
- Frank Simes – guitar, background vocal
- Jon Button – bass, background vocal
- Loren Gold – keyboards, background vocal
- Scott Devours – drums
- David Campbell – arranger
- Keith Levenson – conductor, producer
- Budapest Scoring Orchestra – orchestra

=== Technical ===
- Gareth Johnson – mixing
- Richard Whittaker – mixing, additional production
- Richard Evans – sleeve design
- Andrew Bannister – label design
