= Best of Rockers & Ballads =

Compilation album by Roger Daltrey
- Released: 1991
- Recorded: 1973–1980
- Genre: Rock
- Length: 63:26
- Label: Polydor

Roger Daltrey chronology
Can't Wait to See the Movie (1987)	Best of Rockers & Ballads (1991)	Rocks in the Head (1992)

Best of Rockers & Ballads is a compilation album by the English rock singer Roger Daltrey, released in 1991 by Polydor Records. The music was compiled by Paul Jansen and mastered for CD by Bart Orange.

== Track listing ==
1. "It's a Hard Life" (David Courtney, Leo Sayer)
2. "Giving It All Away" (Courtney, Sayer)
3. "Without Your Love" (Billy Nicholls)
4. "Say It Ain't So, Joe" (Murray Head)
5. "Leon" (Phillip Goodhand-Tait)
6. "The Prisoner" (David Courtney, Todd, Daltrey)
7. "Parade" (Goodhand-Tait)
8. "White City Lights" (Billy Nicholls, Jon Lind)
9. "Oceans Away" (Goodhand-Tait)
10. "One Man Band" (Courtney, Sayer)
11. "Avenging Annie" (Andy Pratt)
12. "Walking the Dog" (Rufus Thomas)
13. "One of the Boys" (Steve Gibbons)
14. "Thinking" (Courtney, Sayer)
15. "Free Me" (Russ Ballard)
16. "Proud" (Ballard)
17. "Reprise – One Man Band" (Courtney, Sayer)

== Song chart positions ==
- "Giving It All Away" (#5 UK), 1973
- "Without Your Love" (#20 US), 1980
- "Free Me" (#39 UK), 1980
