= Days of Light (song) =

1992 single by Roger Daltrey

Single by Roger Daltrey

from the album Rocks in the Head
- Released: 1992
- Recorded: 1992
- Genre: Rock; folk rock; heartland rock
- Length: 3:41
- Label: Atlantic – PRCD 4634-2
- Songwriters: Roger Daltrey; Gerard McMahon
- Producer: Gerard McMahon

Roger Daltrey singles chronology
"'Take Me Home'" (1987)	"Days of Light" (1992)

"'Days of Light'" is a song by Roger Daltrey from his eighth solo album, Rocks in the Head. The song was written by Daltrey and Gerard McMahon, and features lyrics about looking forward to the weekend. According to Daltrey, the song was inspired by his early career as a worker in a sheet-metal factory.

Rocks in the Head was recorded at The Hit Factory in New York City as well as Abbey Road Studios in London and released on the Atlantic Records label in 1992. Production is credited to Gerald McMahon, who also performed as a musician.

When performing the song live at Vancouver, Daltrey forgot the lyrics partway. He explained that it was only the second time he had sung it in his life, so the other time must have been when he did it on Late Night with David Letterman, as documented on YouTube. At any rate, he did not seem too flustered by the slip-up; it was, after all, the first show of his first solo tour since 1985. He just cheerfully started the song over again.

This track and "Who's Gonna Walk on Water" were the only tracks from Rocks in the Head performed live.

The song is considered to sound like Bruce Springsteen.

== Complete live performances of "Days of Light" ==
Below is the complete performances of the song by Roger Daltrey live.

2009;

- 10.10.2009: Vancouver, BC
- 12.10.2009: Seattle, WA
- 14.10.2009: San Francisco, CA
- 15.10.2009: Highland, CA
- 17.10.2009: Los Angeles, CA
- 20.10.2009: Denver, CO
- 22.10.2009: Thackerville, OK
- 24.10.2009: Biloxi, MS
- 25.10.2009: Jacksonville, FL
- 28.10.2009: Durham, NC
- 30.10.2009: Nashville, TN
- 31.10.2009: Elizabeth, IN
- 02.11.2009: Chicago, IL
- 03.11.2009: Cleveland, OH
- 05.11.2009: Orillia, ON
- 07.11.2009: Mashantucket, CT
- 08.11.2009: Boston, MA
- 11.11.2009: Montclair, NJ
- 13.11.2009: Atlantic City, NJ
- 17.11.2009: Red Bank, NJ
- 18.11.2009: Norfolk, VA
- 20.11.2009: New York, NY
- 22.11.2009: Charlotte, NC
- 24.11.2009: Charleston, SC
- 25.11.2009: Buena Vista, FL
- 27.11.2009: Ft. Myers, FL
- 29.11.2009: Hollywood, FL
- 30.11.2009: Clearwater, FL

2010;

- 25.02.2010: Pittsburgh, PA
- 27.02.2010: Nashville, TN
- 28.02.2010: Birmingham, AL
- 02.03.2010: Tulsa, OK
- 03.03.2010: Kansas City, MO
- 05.03.2010: Memphis, TN
- 06.03.2010: New Orleans, LA
- 09.03.2010: Atlanta, GA
- 11.03.2010: Fort Lauderdale, FL
- 13.03.2010: Orlando, FL
- 22.06.2010: Tucson, AZ
- 23.06.2010: Las Vegas, NV
- 25.06.2010: Salina, KS
- 26.06.2010: Kansas City, MO
- 28.06.2010: Milwaukee, WI
- 30.06.2010: Cincinnati, OH
- 02.07.2010: Noblesville, IN

2011;

- 19.03.2011: Bournemouth
- 24.03.2011: London
- 03.07.2011: Wolverhampton
- 06.07.2011: Glasgow
- 07.07.2011: Manchester
- 09.07.2011: Nottingham
- 10.07.2011: Newport
- 12.07.2011: Bristol
- 13.07.2011: Southend
- 16.07.2011: Hampshire
- 19.07.2011: Hull
- 21.07.2011: London
- 22.07.2011: Norwich
- 24.07.2011: London
- 28.07.2011: Isle of Man
- 30.07.2011: Lokeren
- 31.07.2011: Svendborg
- 13.09.2011: Hollywood, FL
- 15.09.2011: Alpharetta, GA
- 17.09.2011: Boston, MA
- 18.09.2011: Newark, NJ
- 21.09.2011: Philadelphia, PA
- 23.09.2011: Union Dale, NY
- 24.09.2011: Hartford, CT
- 27.09.2011: Montreal, QC
- 28.09.2011: Ottawa, ON
- 30.09.2011: Toronto, ONT
- 01.10.2011: Windsor, ONT
- 04.10.2011: Minneapolis, MN
- 07.10.2011: Hammond, IN
- 08.10.2011: St. Louis, MO
- 11.10.2011: Cedar Park, TX
- 12.10.2011: Grand Prairie, TX
- 14.10.2011: Kansas City, MO
- 16.10.2011: Broomfield, CO
- 19.10.2011: Los Angeles, CA
- 21.10.2011: San Jose, CA
- 22.10.2011: Las Vegas, NV
- 24.10.2011: Portland, OR
- 25.10.2011: Seattle, WA
- 27.10.2011: Vancouver, BC
- 29.10.2011: Edmonton, AB
- 30.10.2011: Calgary, AB

2012;

- 09.03.2012: Padova
- 11.03.2012: Genova
- 12.03.2012: Torino
- 15.03.2012: Paris
- 18.03.2012: Trieste
- 20.03.2012: Firenze
- 24.03.2012: Milan
- 23.04.2012: Tokyo
- 27.04.2012: Kanagawa
- 28.04.2012: Osaka

2013;

- 10.08.2013: Costa Mesa, CA

== Personnel ==
- Roger Daltrey - Lead vocals
- Pim Jones - Slide guitar, Acoustic guitar
- Jay Leonhart - Upright bass

== Charts ==
Chart (1992)	Peak position
US Rock	6

== See also ==
- Roger Daltrey discography
