= Going Back Home =

Studio album by Wilko Johnson and Roger Daltrey
- Released: 25 March 2014
- Recorded: November 2013
- Genres: R&B; blues rock; hard rock
- Length: 34:29
- Label: Chess
- Producer: Dave Eringa

Wilko Johnson chronology
Red Hot Rocking Blues (2005)	Going Back Home (2014)

Roger Daltrey chronology
Moonlighting: The Anthology (2005)	Going Back Home (2014)	As Long As I Have You (2018)

Going Back Home is a collaborative studio album by former Dr. Feelgood guitarist Wilko Johnson and the Who's lead vocalist Roger Daltrey, released on 25 March 2014 by Chess Records. The album contains versions of songs previously recorded by Johnson and his former band Dr. Feelgood, as well as a version of "Everybody's Carrying a Gun" by Wilko Johnson and the Solid Senders.

The album entered the UK Albums Chart at No. 3, making it Daltrey's highest ranking since the Who's album Face Dances (No. 2 in 1981), while Johnson's last major chart success was Dr. Feelgood's live album Stupidity which reached No. 1 in 1976.

== Background ==
Johnson and Daltrey decided to work together after meeting when seated next to each other at an awards ceremony in 2010 and quickly striking up a friendship. Daltrey said, "It turned out we both loved Johnny Kidd & the Pirates. They'd been a big influence on both our bands. That heavy power-trio sound, backing up a singer; it's a British institution. No-one does that better than us."

Johnson was diagnosed with pancreatic cancer in January 2013, but was well enough to press ahead with the collaboration when the Who finished their world tour. Going Back Home was recorded in the space of a week in November 2013. According to Johnson, "Roger jumped up and said, 'Let's do it,'. He knew this lovely little studio called Yellow Fish in Uckfield. Unfortunate name for a place, but a great studio." The album's track listing was revealed on 22 February 2014. It was later established that Johnson actually had a less aggressive neuroendocrine tumour, and following radical surgery he was later declared cancer-free.

Some of the musicians who worked with Johnson and Daltrey on the album were current and past Blockheads members Dylan Howe, Norman Watt-Roy (who also worked on Daltrey's 1984 album Parting Should Be Painless), and the Style Council's former keyboardist Mick Talbot.

== Critical reception ==
Professional ratings
Review scores
Source	Rating
AllMusic	4.5/5 stars
The Daily Telegraph	3/5 stars
The Guardian	4/5 stars
Mojo	4/5 stars
The National	4/5 stars
NME	7/10
The Oakland Press	3/4 stars
USA Today	3/4 stars

At The Oakland Press, Gary Graff rated the album three out of four stars, writing that "If this is indeed Johnson’s last gasp, he’s made it a memorable howl." Edna Gunderson of USA Today rated the album three stars out of four, and remarked: "Do they defy age with a ferocious display of R&B? Roger Wilco that." In his review for Mojo magazine, Mark Blake wrote that "Johnson's chopping rhythm guitar and Daltrey's geezerish growl make perfect bedfellows." Blake described Going Back Home as a "joyful, celebratory affair".

== Track listing ==
All songs written by Wilko Johnson except as noted.

No.	Title	Writer(s)	Length
1.	"Going Back Home"	Wilko Johnson, Mick Green	4:00
2.	"Ice on the Motorway"		2:50
3.	"I Keep It to Myself"		3:21
4.	"Can You Please Crawl Out Your Window?"	Bob Dylan	3:37
5.	"Turned 21"		3:06
6.	"Keep On Loving You"	Wilko Johnson, Norman Watt-Roy, Salvatore Ramundo	2:57
7.	"Some Kind of Hero"		2:25
8.	"Sneaking Suspicion"		3:45
9.	"Keep It Out of Sight"		2:43
10.	"Everybody's Carrying a Gun"		2:55
11.	"All Through the City"		2:50
Total length:			34:29

== Personnel ==
- Wilko Johnson - lead guitar
- Roger Daltrey - lead vocals, acoustic guitar
- Norman Watt-Roy - bass guitar
- Dylan Howe - drums, percussion
- Mick Talbot - piano, Hammond organ
- Steve Weston - harmonica

== Charts ==
=== Weekly charts ===
Chart (2014)	Peak position
Belgian Albums (Ultratop Flanders)	97
Belgian Albums (Ultratop Wallonia)	46
Finnish Albums (Suomen virallinen lista)	29
French Albums (SNEP)	117
Scottish Albums (Official Charts)	4
Spanish Albums (Promusicae)	57
Swiss Albums (Schweizer Hitparade)	56
UK Albums (Official Charts)	3

=== Year-end charts ===
Chart (2014)	Position
UK Albums (OCC)	49

== Certifications ==
Region	Certification	Certified units/sales
United Kingdom (BPI)	Gold	100,000^{*}
^{*} Sales figures based on certification alone.
