= The Motown Song =

1991 single by Rod Stewart

Single by Rod Stewart featuring the Temptations

from the album Vagabond Heart
- B-side: "Sweet Soul Music" (live)
- Released: 3 June 1991
- Studio: Cherokee, Conway (Hollywood, California); Sarm (London, England)
- Length: 4:00 (album version); 4:17 (single remix)
- Label: Warner Bros.
- Songwriter: Larry John McNally
- Producer: Richard Perry

Rod Stewart singles chronology
"Rhythm of My Heart" (1991)	"The Motown Song" (1991)	"Broken Arrow" (1991)

The Temptations singles chronology
"Soul to Soul" (1990)	"The Motown Song" (1991)	"The Jones" (1991)

"The Motown Song" is a song performed by British singer Rod Stewart featuring American vocal group the Temptations. The song is from Stewart's 16th studio album, Vagabond Heart (1991). It was written by Larry John McNally and was originally recorded by McNally for the soundtrack to the film Quicksilver in 1986. McNally recorded a new version in 2015 for the compilation I. C. Independent Celebration, Vol. 1 for the German label Birdstone Records.

Released on 3 June 1991 by Warner Bros. Records, the single peaked at number 10 on both the UK Singles Chart and the US Billboard Hot 100. In Canada, the song reached number one on the RPM 100 Hit Tracks chart on 5 October 1991. It also reached number three on the Billboard Adult Contemporary chart and number one on the RPM 40AC (Adult Contemporary) chart.

== Music video ==
A music video for the song was produced by Animation City, an animation company in London, England, directed by Derek Hayes. It followed the success of the Madonna video "Dear Jessie", and Elton John's "Club at the End of the Street", by the same company. The video, set in an unnamed city, depicts live-action and animated versions of Stewart gathering neighbors together for a party on the rooftop of an apartment building.

It paid tribute to Motown (featuring animated versions of the Temptations, the Supremes and former Motown artist Michael Jackson). It also featured other stars of the time, including animated versions of rapper Vanilla Ice, and singers Sinéad O'Connor, Madonna and Elton John. Several comical mishaps befall these artists caused by Stewart's dog; Vanilla Ice gets buried under a truckload of ice cubes, O'Connor slips while shaving her head and has to wear bandages over the resulting nicks, Madonna gets her dress ripped off in a car door and shows up for the party in her underwear, and Jackson moonwalks into an open manhole. At the end of the video, the animation is crumpled up as a sheet of paper by the live-action Stewart, who has been drawing the scene in an art studio. He kicks the paper ball into a trash can, picks up his jacket, and leaves with a smile.

== Credits and personnel ==
Credits are lifted from the Vagabond Heart album booklet.

Studios

- Recorded at Cherokee Studio, Conway Studio (Hollywood, California), and Sarm Studio (London, England)
- Mastered at Precision Mastering (Los Angeles)

Personnel

- Larry John McNally – writing
- The Temptations – background vocals
- Steve Lukather – guitars
- Paul Jackson Jr. – guitars
- David Paich – acoustic and electric piano, basic track arrangement
- Khris Kellow – synth bass
- Steve Porcaro – synthesizers
- Steve Lindsey – synthesizers, synth horns, horn arrangement
- Jeff Porcaro – drums
- Chris Trujillo – percussion
- Richard Perry – production
- Julie Larson – production coordination
- Steve Macmillan – mixing, engineering
- Dee Robb – additional engineering
- Eric Anest – additional engineering
- Leon Granados – engineering assistance
- John Karpowich – engineering assistance
- Scott Ralston – engineering assistance
- Eric Rudd – engineering assistance
- Stephen Marcussen – mastering

== Charts ==
=== Weekly charts ===
Chart (1991)	Peak position
Australia (ARIA)	26
Austria (Ö3 Austria Top 40)	22
Belgium (Ultratop 50 Flanders)	42
Canada Top Singles (RPM)	1
Canada Adult Contemporary (RPM)	1
Denmark (IFPI)	7
Europe (Eurochart Hot 100)	18
Europe (European Hit Radio)	4
Germany (GfK)	21
Ireland (IRMA)	2
Luxembourg (Radio Luxembourg)	5
New Zealand (Recorded Music NZ)	23
Sweden (Sverigetopplistan)	11
UK Singles (Official Charts)	10
UK Airplay (Music Week)	1
US Billboard Hot 100	10
US Adult Contemporary (Billboard)	3
US Cash Box Top 100	9
Zimbabwe (ZIMA)	1

=== Year-end charts ===
Chart (1991)	Position
Canada Top Singles (RPM)	10
Canada Adult Contemporary (RPM)	10
Europe (European Hit Radio)	19
Germany (Media Control)	90
Sweden (Topplistan)	79
US Billboard Hot 100	99
US Adult Contemporary (Billboard)	14

== Release history ==
Region	Date	Format(s)	Label(s)	Ref.
United Kingdom	3 June 1991	12-inch vinyl; CD; cassette	Warner Bros.	
Australia	8 July 1991	7-inch vinyl; 12-inch vinyl; CD; cassette	Warner Bros.	
