= Let Me Down Easy (Roger Daltrey song) =

Single by Roger Daltrey

from the album Under a Raging Moon
- Released: November 1985 (US and Canada only)
- Recorded: 1985
- Genre: Pop rock
- Length: 4:08
- Label: Atlantic
- Songwriters: Bryan Adams; Jim Vallance
- Producer: Alan Shacklock

Roger Daltrey singles chronology
"After the Fire" (1985)	"Let Me Down Easy" (1985)	"Under a Raging Moon" (1986)

Music video
- "Let Me Down Easy" on YouTube

"'Let Me Down Easy'" is a song by the English rock singer Roger Daltrey, the lead vocalist of the Who. The song was written by the Canadians Bryan Adams and Jim Vallance and included on Daltrey's sixth solo studio album Under a Raging Moon (1985) as the opening track on the second side of the LP. The album was a tribute to the Who's former drummer Keith Moon. The song was released as a single in November 1985 by Atlantic Records in the US and Canada only.

The single reached No. 86 on the US Billboard Hot 100 singles chart and No. 11 on Billboard's Top Rock Tracks chart.

== Background ==
When Jim Vallance was asked about the track, he recalled that they wrote the song during January 1984 and that: "Adams and I originally wrote "Let Me Down Easy" for Stevie Nicks, but I don't know if she ever heard the song. Regardless, I thought Roger did a superb job." Bryan Adams appears in the original music video, despite not appearing on the studio recording.

== Critical reception ==
Cashbox wrote that it's an "intimately passionate track which...makes good use of Daltrey’s powerful lead vocals."

== Personnel ==
- Roger Daltrey – lead vocals
- Robbie McIntosh – lead guitar, guitar solo
- Mark Brzezicki – drums
- John Siegler – bass guitar
- Nick Glennie-Smith – Hammond organ
- Alan Shacklock – tambourine
- Annie McCaig – backing vocals
- John Payne – backing vocals
- Mark Williamson – backing vocals

== Charts ==
Chart (1985)	Peak position
Canadian RPM Top Singles	82
US Billboard Hot 100	86
US Billboard Mainstream Rock Tracks	11
