= The Pride You Hide =

Single by Roger Daltrey

from the album Under a Raging Moon
- Released: 17 April 1986 (US); 2 June 1986 (UK)
- Recorded: 1985
- Length: 4:33
- Label: 10; Atlantic
- Songwriters: Alan Dalgleish; Roger Daltrey; Nicky Tesco
- Producer: Alan Shacklock

Roger Daltrey singles chronology
"Under a Raging Moon" (1986)	"The Pride You Hide" (1986)	"Quicksilver Lightning" (1986)

Official audio
- "The Pride You Hide" on YouTube

"The Pride You Hide" is a song by the English rock singer Roger Daltrey, who at the time was the former lead vocalist of the Who. The song was written by Alan Dalgleish, Nicky Tesco and Roger Daltrey. The track was included on Roger Daltrey's sixth solo studio album, Under a Raging Moon, as the fourth track on the first side of the LP. The album was a tribute to the Who's former drummer Keith Moon.

The song was released as a single in 1986 by Ten Records in Europe, and Atlantic Records in the US, peaking at No. 92 on the UK singles chart.

The single was re-released as a limited edition gatefold double pack, which featured the exclusive B-side "Breakout", and live tracks including a cover version of the Who's 1967 single "Pictures of Lily" and a version of "Don't Talk to Strangers" from Under a Raging Moon.

== Critical reception ==
Cashbox called it a "forlorn ballad [that] shows a slow side of Daltrey, though he cuts loose on the bridge."

== Personnel ==
- Roger Daltrey – lead vocals
- Robbie McIntosh – guitars
- Mark Brzezicki – drums
- John Siegler – bass
- Nick Glennie-Smith – Emulator
- Alan Shacklock – percussion
- Mark Williamson – backing vocals
- John Payne – backing vocals
- Annie McCaig – backing vocals
