= Parting Should Be Painless =

Studio album by Roger Daltrey
- Released: 17 February 1984
- Genres: Pop rock; new wave; art rock; synth-pop
- Length: 40:03
- Labels: Atlantic; WEA
- Producer: Mike Thorne

Roger Daltrey chronology
McVicar (1980)	Parting Should Be Painless (1984)	Under a Raging Moon (1985)

Parting Should Be Painless is the fifth solo studio album by the English singer Roger Daltrey, released on 17 February 1984, by Atlantic Records in the United States, and by WEA in Germany, and Japan. The album was Daltrey's first solo album since the initial break-up of rock band the Who, and the first by any member of the band since the break-up. "Walking in My Sleep", "Parting Would Be Painless", and "Would a Stranger Do" were all released as singles. Two of those singles failed to chart, while "Walking in My Sleep" was a success, peaking at No. 4 on the Mainstream Rock Tracks chart.

On release, the album was received negatively by the majority of music critics. It was also Daltrey's poorest selling studio album up to that point, peaking at No. 102 on the US Billboard chart, however it did make the Top 60 in the Netherlands, peaking at No. 45 on the MegaCharts. The album was produced by Mike Thorne, with the executive producer being listed under the pseudonym "Spike". This is presumably the same woman who was credited as the executive producer of Pete Townshend's compilation album Scoop (1983), later revealed to be Helen Wilkins. The album was re-released as a limited edition audio CD on 12 October 2004, by Wounded Bird Records, but it vanished from the market almost as quickly as it was issued, becoming something of a rarity and by 2014 copies in very good condition were trading for £250.

The album was a concerted effort on Daltrey's part to vent his frustrations in the wake of the Who's break-up by assembling a set of roughly autobiographical songs. These included a track contributed by Roxy Music's Bryan Ferry ("Going Strong"), and a cover version of a song by the Eurythmics ("Somebody Told Me"). The album featured contributions from bass player Norman Watt-Roy, and keyboardist Mick Gallagher who were both members of Ian Dury and the Blockheads. It also features contributions from the critically acclaimed saxophonist Michael Brecker, and from two prolific session musicians, guitarist Chris Spedding, and drummer Allan Schwartzberg (both of whom had worked with Ferry/Roxy Music).

== Production and recording ==
Musically, according to Daltrey the album covered areas that he had wanted The Who to pursue. "Pete [Townshend] and I both said the Who was an alternative to heavy metal, but toward the end, John [Entwistle] got more into that and Pete and I further away from it. Because we were compromising so much, we ended up just settling into what we knew how to do best. It bored me to tears, and I know it bored Pete to tears, too."

== Composition ==
The track Parting Should Be Painless was one of two tracks written by the former Marshall Hain bass player, Kit Hain, whose songs were written for or covered by many artists. Daltrey was again relying on other artists writing contributions to make a cohesive album, and this time, the list included songs written by former Roxy Music lead singer, Bryan Ferry ("Going Strong"), the Eurythmics co-founders Annie Lennox and Dave Stewart ("Somebody Told Me"), and ex-Ian Gillan keyboardist Colin Towns ("How Does the Cold Wind Cry"), as well as successful professional songwriters Nicky Chinn and Simon Climie.

"I'm not a songwriter, but within this album I tried to get songs that — the majority of the songs, anyway — sum up my feelings in the last year," he explained during an appearance on Good Morning America. "Parting Should Be Painless" is a song that refers to the demise of the Who."

== Critical reception ==
Professional ratings
Review scores
Source	Rating
AllMusic	2/5 stars

The album received negative reviews upon its release, with William Ruhlmann of AllMusic retrospectively writing that the album "contains some interesting tracks, including Bryan Ferry's "Going Strong," which gives you an idea what Roxy Music would sound like if Daltrey was its lead singer", but "for the most part, it consists of mediocre material indifferently sung." Writing for The Wall Street Journal, critic Pam Lambert described the album as "bland". During an interview in promotion for his 1987 album Can't Wait to See the Movie, Daltrey defended the album explaining, "it's a depressing album. It wasn't what people wanted to hear from me. To appreciate it you have to be depressed. That's the frame of mind I was in."

Cash Box said praised the title track's "self-assuredness and consistently choice musicianship" and Daltrey's "powerful" vocal.

== Track listing ==
Side one
No.	Title	Writer(s)	Length
1.	"Walking in My Sleep"	Jack Green; Leslie Adey	3:28
2.	"Parting Would Be Painless"	Kit Hain	3:41
3.	"Is There Anybody Out There?"	Nicky Chinn; Steve Glen	4:17
4.	"Would a Stranger Do?"	Steve Andrews; Simon Climie	3:33
5.	"Going Strong"	Bryan Ferry	5:08

Side two
No.	Title	Writer(s)	Length
6.	"Looking for You"	Kit Hain	3:20
7.	"Somebody Told Me"	Annie Lennox; Dave Stewart	3:07
8.	"One Day"	Gerald Milne	3:10
9.	"How Does the Cold Wind Cry"	Colin Towns	3:46
10.	"Don't Wait on the Stairs"	Steve Swindells	6:33
Total length:			40:03

== Personnel ==
A promotional poster for the album.

Credits are adapted from the album's liner notes.

- Roger Daltrey – lead and background vocals; harmonica
- Chris Spedding – guitars
- Mick Gallagher – keyboards
- Allan Schwartzberg – drums
- Norman Watt-Roy – bass guitar
- Michael Brecker – tenor saxophone
- Mike Thorne – synthesizers
- Robert Medici – marimba
- David Tofani – clarinet
- Billy Nicholls – backing vocals
- James Biondolillo – string and horn arrangements

Production team

- Mike Thorne – producer
- Harvey Goldberg – engineer
- John Brand – engineer
- Don Wershba – engineer
- Lincoln Clapp – engineer
- Graham Hughes – photography

== Charts ==
Chart (1984)	Peak position
Canada Top Albums/CDs (RPM)	90
Dutch Albums (Album Top 100)	45
US Billboard 200	102
