= Vagabond Heart =

Studio album by Rod Stewart
- Released: 25 March 1991
- Studios: Cherokee, Hollywood; Conway, Hollywood; SARM, London
- Genres: Rock; pop rock
- Length: 58:26
- Label: Warner Bros.
- Producers: Bernard Edwards; Trevor Horn; Patrick Leonard; Richard Perry; Rod Stewart; Lenny Waronker

Rod Stewart chronology
Downtown Train – Selections from the Storyteller Anthology (1990)	Vagabond Heart (1991)	Lead Vocalist (1993)

Singles from Vagabond Heart
- 1. "It Takes Two" Released: 12 November 1990; 2. "Rhythm of My Heart" Released: 4 March 1991; 3. "The Motown Song" Released: 3 June 1991; 4. "Broken Arrow" Released: 26 August 1991

Professional ratings
Review scores
Source	Rating
AllMusic	4/5 stars
Chicago Tribune	2/4 stars
Robert Christgau	(dud)
Entertainment Weekly	B−
Houston Chronicle	3/5 stars
Los Angeles Times	2/5 stars
NME	5/10
The New York Times	(unfavourable)
Orlando Sentinel	2/5 stars
Rolling Stone	4/5 stars

Vagabond Heart is the sixteenth studio album by British recording artist Rod Stewart, released on 25 March 1991 by Warner Bros. Records. The album reached No. 10 in the US, and reached No. 2 in the UK. The album features five singles, among them a cover of Robbie Robertson's song "Broken Arrow" (No. 20 in the US) and Van Morrison's song "Have I Told You Lately", which would become a hit two years later (in a live version), and is Stewart's most recent top five solo hit in the US and the UK. The two biggest hits from the album were "Rhythm of My Heart" (No. 3 in the UK/No. 5 in the US) and "The Motown Song" (No. 10 in the UK and US). The latter song features with Steve Lukather, David Paich, Steve Porcaro and Jeff Porcaro—nearly all of the band Toto.

The "Vagabond Heart Tour" was made available on video in 1992, shot during a concert in Los Angeles on Valentine's Day.

== Critical reception ==
Overall, the album received positive reviews. According to Rolling Stone, "Vagabond Heart finds Stewart rising to new challenges as both a songwriter and a singer. The strength of the songs and the depth of Stewart's conviction make this his most compelling work since the early 1970s."

AllMusic felt the album was "stronger, more diverse album than its predecessor, Out of Order, featuring a more consistent set of songs."

== Track listing ==
No.	Title	Writer(s)	Producer(s)	Length
1.	"Rhythm of My Heart"	Marc Jordan, John Capek	Trevor Horn	4:15
2.	"Rebel Heart"	Rod Stewart, Jeff Golub, Chuck Kentis, Carmine Rojas	Rod Stewart, Bernard Edwards	4:10
3.	"Broken Arrow"	Robbie Robertson	Patrick Leonard, Lenny Waronker^{[a]}	4:26
4.	"It Takes Two" (duet with Tina Turner)	William "Mickey" Stevenson, Sylvia Moy	Stewart, Edwards	4:14
5.	"When a Man's in Love"	Stewart, Golub, Kentis, Rojas	Stewart, Edwards	5:34
6.	"You Are Everything"	Thom Bell, Linda Creed	Stewart, Edwards	4:09
7.	"The Motown Song"	Larry John McNally	Richard Perry	4:00
8.	"Go Out Dancing"	Stewart, Golub, Kentis	Stewart, Edwards	4:20
9.	"No Holding Back"	Stewart, Jim Cregan, Kevin Savigar	Stewart, Edwards	5:47
10.	"Have I Told You Lately"	Van Morrison	Stewart, Edwards	4:01
11.	"Moment of Glory"	Stewart, Golub, Kentis, Rojas	Stewart, Edwards	4:47
12.	"Downtown Train"	Tom Waits	Trevor Horn	4:41
13.	"If Only"	Stewart, Cregan, Savigar	Stewart, Edwards	4:56

Notes

- ^a signifies a co-producer
- "Downtown Train" and "This Old Heart of Mine" are omitted on cassette copies, as well as some CD versions.

== Personnel ==
- Rod Stewart – vocals
- Richard Cottle – keyboards (1)
- Kevin Savigar – keyboards (1, 2, 5, 6, 9, 13), string arrangements and conductor (1)
- Mick MacNeil – accordion (1)
- Gary Maughn – Fairlight programming (1)
- Chuck Kentis – keyboards (2, 4–6, 8–11), drum programming (5, 9)
- Patrick Leonard – keyboards (3)
- David Paich – acoustic piano (7), electric piano (7), basic track arrangements (7)
- Steve Porcaro – synthesizers (7)
- Steve Lindsey – synthesizers (7), synth horns (7), horn arrangements (7)
- Robin Le Mesurier – guitars (1)
- Steve Lukather – guitars (1, 7)
- Jeff Golub – guitars (2, 4–6, 8–11), acoustic guitar (13), electric guitar (13)
- Dann Huff – guitars (2), guitar solo (2)
- Tim Pierce – guitars (3)
- Paul Jackson Jr. – guitars (7)
- Waddy Wachtel – guitars (8), guitar solo (8)
- Jim Cregan – guitars (9)
- Neil Stubenhaus – bass guitar (1)
- Carmine Rojas – bass guitar (2, 5, 9, 11)
- Jimmy Johnson – bass guitar (3)
- Bernard Edwards – bass guitar (4–6, 8, 10)
- Khris Kellow – synth bass (7)
- John Robinson – drums (1)
- Rave Calmer – drums (2, 4, 8, 10, 11, 13)
- Jim Keltner – drums (3)
- Tony Brock – drums (6)
- Jeff Porcaro – drums (7)
- Luis Conte – percussion (3)
- Chris Trujillo – percussion (7)
- Paulinho da Costa – percussion (10, 13)
- Kevin Weed – bagpipes (1)
- Jimmy Roberts – saxophones (2, 8), sax solo (4, 11)
- Nick Lane – trombone (2)
- Rick Braun – trumpet (2)
- Richard Greene – violin (6)
- Bruce Miller – string arrangements and conductor (5, 10)
- Nick Strimple – choir director (1)
- Joe Turano – choir director (1), backing vocals (1)
- John Batdorf – backing vocals (1)
- Lionel Conway – backing vocals (1)
- Jerry Cook – backing vocals (1)
- Randy Crenshaw – backing vocals (1)
- Gary Falcone – backing vocals (1)
- Roger Freeland – backing vocals (1)
- Robert Jason – backing vocals (1)
- Arnold Stiefel – backing vocals (1)
- Roy Galloway – backing vocals (2)
- Luther Waters – backing vocals (2)
- Twinkle Schascle – backing vocals (3)
- Tina Turner – vocals (4)
- The Waters – backing vocals (6, 8, 9, 11)
- The Temptations – backing vocals (7)
- Angela Winbush – backing vocals (11), additional vocals (11)

=== Production ===
- Malcolm Cullimore – production coordinator (1–6, 8–13)
- Julie Larson – production coordinator (7)
- Nancy Poertner – project manager
- Jeri Heiden – art direction
- Eric Handel – design
- Ann Field – illustration
- Randee St. Nicholas – photography

Technical

- Stephen Marcussen – mastering at Precision Mastering (Hollywood, CA)
- Steve MacMillan – engineer (1, 2, 4–11, 13), mixing (1, 2, 4–11, 13)
- Trevor Horn – mixing (1)
- Bernard Edwards – mixing (2, 4–6, 8–11, 13)
- Jerry Jordan – engineer (3), mixing (3)
- Bryant Arnett – assistant engineer (2, 4–6, 8–11, 13)
- John Karpowich – assistant engineer (2, 4–11, 13)
- Gil Morales – assistant engineer (2, 4–6, 8–11, 13)
- Marc Moreau – assistant engineer (3)
- Leon Granados – assistant engineer (7)
- Scott Ralston – assistant engineer (7)
- Eric Rudd – assistant engineer (7)
- Tony Arena – additional engineer (10)
- Eric Anest – additional engineer (7)
- Dee Ross – additional engineer (7)

== Publishing ==
- "Rhythm of My Heart" copyright WB Music Corp./Jamm Music/Bibo Music Publishers. "Rebel Heart", "When a Man's in Love" and "Moment of Glory" published by Rod Stewart (Intersong Music Admin.)/Cat in the Hat Music/Kentis Music/Malango Bro. "Broken Arrow" published by Medicine Hat Music. "It Takes Two" published by Stone Agate Music Division. "You Are Everything" published by Assorted Music/Bellboy Music/The Mighty Three Group. "The Motown Song" published by Geffen Music/McNally Music Publishing/MCA Music Publishing. "Go Out Dancing" published by Rod Stewart (Intersong Music Admin.)/Cat in the Hat Music/Kentis Music. "No Holding Back" and "If Only" published by Rod Stewart (Intersong Music Admin.)/Almo Music Corp/Kevin Savigar Music/BMG Inc. "Have I Told You Lately" published by PolyGram International Publishing, Inc.

== Charts ==
=== Weekly charts ===
Chart (1991)	Peak position
Australian Albums (ARIA)	1
Austrian Albums (Ö3 Austria)	5
Canada Top Albums/CDs (RPM)	2
Dutch Albums (Album Top 100)	31
French SNEP Albums Chart	29
German Albums (Offizielle Top 100)	3
Hungarian Albums (MAHASZ)	6
Japanese Oricon Albums Chart	34
New Zealand Albums (RMNZ)	2
Norwegian Albums (VG-lista)	6
Swedish Albums (Sverigetopplistan)	2
Swiss Albums (Schweizer Hitparade)	2
UK Albums (Official Charts)	2
US Billboard 200	10

=== Year-end charts ===
Chart (1991)	Position
Australian Albums (ARIA)	2
Austrian Albums (Ö3 Austria)	12
Canada Top Albums/CDs (RPM)	6
German Albums (Offizielle Top 100)	7
Swiss Albums (Schweizer Hitparade)	4
UK Albums (OCC)	43
US Billboard 200	38

== Certifications ==
Certifications for Vagabond Heart
Region	Certification	Certified units/sales
Australia (ARIA)	4× Platinum	280,000^{^}
Austria (IFPI Austria)	Gold	25,000^{*}
Canada (Music Canada)	3× Platinum	300,000^{^}
France (SNEP)	Gold	100,000^{*}
Germany (BVMI)	Platinum	500,000^{^}
New Zealand (RMNZ)	Platinum	15,000^{^}
Sweden (GLF)	Platinum	100,000^{^}
Switzerland (IFPI Switzerland)	Platinum	50,000^{^}
United Kingdom (BPI)	Platinum	300,000^{^}
United States (RIAA)	Platinum	1,000,000^{^}
^{*} Sales figures based on certification alone.^{^} Shipments figures based on certification alone.
