= Walking in My Sleep =

Single by Roger Daltrey

from the album Parting Should Be Painless
- B-side: "Somebody Told Me"
- Released: February 1984
- Recorded: 1984
- Genre: Rock; art rock; new wave
- Length: 3:20
- Label: Atlantic; WEA
- Songwriters: Leslie Adey; Jack Green
- Producers: Mike Thorne; "Spike"

Roger Daltrey singles chronology
"Without Your Love" (1980)	"Walking in My Sleep" (1984)	"After the Fire" (1985)

Music video
- "Walking in My Sleep" on YouTube

"Walking in My Sleep" is a song written by Leslie Adey and Jack Green and recorded by the English rock singer Roger Daltrey for his fifth solo studio album Parting Should Be Painless (1984). The single was produced by Mike Thorne, with executive producer listed as "Spike". This is presumably the same woman who was credited as the executive producer of Pete Townshend's compilation album Scoop (1983), later revealed to be Helen Wilkins.

The single, "Walking in My Sleep", peaked at number 4 on the US Billboard's Mainstream Rock Charts and number 40 on the Netherlands's MegaCharts the single also reached No. 56 on the UK singles chart and No. 62 on the US Billboard Hot 100 and No. 19 on the Austrian Singles Charts.

The single's music video featured Ian Dury, who was best known as the lead vocalist of the English band Ian Dury and the Blockheads.

== Track listing ==
- 12" Single (U 9686 (T), 259628-0)
1. "Walking in My Sleep" (Leslie Adey, Jack Green) – 3:20
2. "Somebody Told Me" (Annie Lennox, Dave Stewart) – 3:10
3. "Gimme Some Lovin'" (Steve Winwood, Spencer Davis, Muff Winwood) – 3:45
- 7" Single (U 9686, U9686)
1. "Walking in My Sleep" (Adey, Green) – 3:20
2. "Somebody Told Me" (Lennox, Stewart) – 3:10

== Personnel ==
- Roger Daltrey – lead vocals
- Michael Brecker – tenor saxophone
- Chris Spedding – lead guitar
- Allan Schwartzberg – drums
- Norman Watt-Roy – bass guitar
- Mick Gallagher – keyboards
- Mike Thorne – synthesizers
- Billy Nicholls – backing vocals

== See also ==
- Roger Daltrey discography
