= The Wheels on the Bus (video series) =

- Directed by: Timothy Armstrong
- Written by: Timothy Armstrong
- Starring: Roger Daltrey; Janie Laurel Escalle
- Production company: Our Happy Child Productions, LLC
- Country: United States
- Language: English

The Wheels on the Bus is a video series by Our Happy Child Productions, LLC, of Simi Valley, California. The Wheels on the Bus series is a collection of educational DVDs, TV series, music CDs and downloadable videos that aim to teach early skills to young children. The series features songs sung by the Who's lead vocalist Roger Daltrey.

== History ==
Our Happy Child Productions was founded by Timothy Armstrong, an independent film producer. He created the first DVD in the series, Mango and Papaya’s Animal Adventure and has written, directed and produced The Wheels on the Bus series. The music is composed by Laura Hall. The series stars rock singer Roger Daltrey as Argon the Dragon, and Janie Laurel Escalle as Coco.

== Series ==
Videos in the series include:

- The Wheels on the Bus Video: Mango and Papaya's Animal Adventures (2003)
- The Wheels on the Bus Video: Mango Helps the Moon Mouse (2005)
- Wheels on the Bus: Mango's Big Dog Parade (2007)

== Reception ==
Dove.org praised the series. Jan Crain Rudeen of Rocky Mountain News said, "Sometimes the lip-syncing is a tad off, but overall, The Wheels on the Bus is a short, lively ride for children." In a mixed review of The Wheels on the Bus Video: Mango and Papaya's Animal Adventure, R. Reagan of Video Librarian wrote, "A couple of flaws: my three-year-old son pointed out that buses don't use gasoline as stated in one song ('they drink diesel'), and a cow that exited the bus several scenes earlier suddenly reappears (can you say "continuity error"?). A better version overall than the British import The Wheels on the Bus, this is recommended." The Patriot-News's Jennifer Sholly said of the same video, "The simple story line, based on the classic children's song, is well-suited for the toddler set."

The series won the Parents' Choice Silver Honor Award from the Parents Choice Foundation and KIDS FIRST! All-Star endorsement from the Coalition for Quality Children's Media.
