= Rudy Ramos =

American actor and musician (born 1945)

- Born: September 19, 1950 (age 75); Lawton, Oklahoma, U.S.
- Occupations: Actor, musician
- Years active: 1969–present

Rudy Ramos (born September 19, 1950) is an American actor and musician. His acting career has covered six decades, and includes recurring roles on The High Chaparral, Hunter, and Yellowstone.

== Early life ==
Ramos was born and raised in Lawton, Oklahoma and has three siblings, two brothers and a sister. During an interview he stated that he is half Mexica – a band of Aztecs – and half Mexican.

When Ramos was about ten years old his family moved to the north side of Lawton, which was a mile from Fort Sill, where Geronimo lived for the last 15 years of his life, and where he died. Geronimo became Ramos' childhood hero and, later in life, Ramos would star in the one-man show Geronimo: Life on the Reservation.

== Career ==
Ramos first television role was a small part on Ironside. He went on to have a recurring role as Wind during the last season of the television western The High Chaparral from 1970-1971. He played Reuben Garcia on Hunter from 1987-1988. Ramos played Felix Long on Yellowstone from 2018–2024.

His films include Helter Skelter, The Enforcer (both 1976), The Driver (1978), Defiance (1980), Quicksilver (1986), Beverly Hills Cop II (1987), Open House (1987), Colors (1988).

For many years Ramos starred in the one-man theater production Geronimo: Life on the Reservation. The first performance was in Tucson, Arizona in 2013. The show toured across the country until COVID-19 halted live performances.

During Native American Heritage Month in November 2020, Ramos was highlighted in a story by Hillary Atkin for the Television Academy Emmys.

== Filmography and Television ==
Year	Title	Role	Notes
1969	Ironside		TV series-1 Episode (uncredited)
1970–1971	The High Chaparral	Wind	TV series-7 episodes
1971	The Virginian	An indian	season 9 episode 16 (The Animal)
1976	Helter Skelter	Danny DeCarlo	Made for TV movie
1976	Hawaii Five-O	Louie Pakoa	TV series-1 Episode
1976	The Enforcer	Mendez, Robber #1	
1978	The Driver	Teeth	
1980	Defiance	Angel Cruz	
1983	Hill Street Blues	Night Lieutenant	TV series-1 Episode
1985	MacGyver	Pete Torgut	TV series-1 Episode
1985	Torchlight		
1986	Quicksilver	Gypsy	
1987	Beverly Hills Cop II	Ignacio	
1987	Open House	Rudy Estevez	
1987–1988	Hunter	Reuben Garcia	TV series-12 episodes
1988	Colors	Lieutenant Melindez	
1992	To Protect and Serve	Aguilar	
1994	Murder, She Wrote	Mario Fernandez	TV series-1 Episode
1995	The Spy Within	Ortiz	
2000	Road Dogz	Canto	
2009	Mr. Sadman	Juan Carlos	
2018–2024	Yellowstone	Felix Long	TV series
2026	Marshals	Felix Long	TV series
