= After the Fire (song) =

Single by Roger Daltrey

from the album Under a Raging Moon
- Released: September 1985
- Recorded: 1985
- Length: 4:36
- Label: Ten; Atlantic
- Songwriter: Pete Townshend
- Producer: Alan Shacklock

Roger Daltrey singles chronology
"Walking in My Sleep" (1984)	"After the Fire" (1985)	"Let Me Down Easy" (1985)

Music video
- "After the Fire" on YouTube

"After the Fire" is a song by the English rock singer Roger Daltrey, the lead vocalist of the Who. This song is the opening track on Daltrey's sixth solo studio album, Under a Raging Moon (1985). "After the Fire" was the only song written by fellow Who member Pete Townshend for a Daltrey solo studio album. It was considered a hit for Daltrey, receiving extensive play on MTV. The song was also played during the second-season finale of the American crime drama television series Miami Vice during a flashback scene.

== Background ==
"After the Fire" was initially planned to be played by the Who at Live Aid in July 1985 and is about the 1983–1985 famine in Ethiopia. However, the band committed at the last minute and were unable to rehearse the song, so it was given to Daltrey to record for Under a Raging Moon, with all royalties given to the Band Aid Trust. Pete Townshend explained that it was written explicitly for Live Aid and compares the situation in Africa to a fire and that the concert would be figuratively putting it out. But despite this, it will always still "smolder and burn".

Townshend performed the song live during his Deep End concerts in 1986 with David Gilmour of Pink Floyd on guitar.

== Track listings ==
UK release, 1985

- "After the Fire" (Pete Townshend)
- "It Don't Satisfy Me" (Alan Shacklock, Roger Daltrey)
- "Love Me Like You Do" (Andy Nye)

Australia release, 1985

- "After the Fire"
- "It Don't Satisfy Me"

Canada release, 1985

- "After the Fire"
- "It Don't Satisfy Me"

Italy release, 1985

- "After the Fire"
- "It Don't Satisfy Me"

Japan release, 1985

- "After the Fire"
- "It Don't Satisfy Me"

Mexico release, 1985

- "After the Fire"
- "It Don't Satisfy Me"

New Zealand release, 1985

- "After the Fire"
- "It Don't Satisfy Me"

== Charts ==
"After the Fire" peaked at No. 48 on the US Billboard Hot 100 and No. 3 on the US Top Rock Tracks charts.

== Personnel ==
- Roger Daltrey – lead and harmony vocals
- Mark Brzezicki – drums
- Tony Butler – bass
- Robbie McIntosh – guitars
- Nick Glennie-Smith – keyboards
- Alan Shacklock – piano
- Bruce Watson – EBow

== See also ==
- Roger Daltrey discography
