= Rocks in the Head =

Studio album by Roger Daltrey
- Released: 1992
- Studio: The Hit Factory London (New York)
- Genres: Rock; hard rock
- Length: 48:04
- Label: Atlantic 7 82359-2
- Producer: Gerard McMahon

Roger Daltrey chronology
Best of Rockers & Ballads (1991)	Rocks in the Head (1992)	A Celebration: The Music of Pete Townshend and The Who (1994)

Rocks in the Head is the eighth solo studio album by the English rock singer Roger Daltrey. It was released in 1992 on Atlantic Records, and recorded at The Hit Factory & Abbey Road Studios.

== Roger Daltrey's co-written songs ==
Roger Daltrey is credited (along with Gerard McMahon) for co-writing seven of the eleven tracks, including "Times Changed", "You Can't Call It Love", "Love Is", "Blues Man's Road", "Days of Light", "Everything a Heart Could Ever Want", and "Unforgettable Opera".

The notes credit "Musical Direction and Production" to Gerard McMahon, who also performs as a primary backup musician.

Cover photography and design were by Graham Hughes.

== Song overview ==
"Everything a Heart Could Ever Want (Willow)" was written about Daltrey's daughter. Daltrey's daughter, Willow, sings backing vocals on the song.

"Days of Light" peaked at No. 6 on the US rock charts.

Professional ratings
Review scores
Source	Rating
AllMusic	link
Time	link

== Track listing ==
No.	Title	Writer(s)	Length
1.	"Who's Gonna Walk on Water"	Gerard McMahon	4:45
2.	"Before My Time Is Up"	Dave Katz, McMahon	5:05
3.	"Times Changed"	Daltrey, McMahon	4:23
4.	"You Can't Call It Love"	Daltrey, Ray, Dave Ruffy	4:15
5.	"Mirror Mirror"	McMahon	4:46
6.	"Perfect World"	McMahon	3:56
7.	"Love Is"	Ricky Byrd, Daltrey, Katz, McMahon	4:10
8.	"Blues Man's Road"	Byrd, Daltrey, McMahon	4:05
9.	"Everything a Heart Could Ever Want (Willow)"	Daltrey, McMahon	4:20
10.	"Days of Light"	Daltrey, McMahon	3:42
11.	"Unforgettable Opera"	Daltrey, McMahon	4:48
Total length:			48:04

== Personnel ==
- Roger Daltrey – guitar, harmonica, vocals
- Emily Burridge – cello
- Ricky Byrd – guitar, backing vocals
- Jamie Daltrey – backing vocals
- Mark Egan – bass
- Gregg Gerson – drums
- Don Henze – backing vocals
- Pim Jones – guitar, acoustic guitar, slide guitar, soloist, wah wah guitar
- David Katz – bass, keyboards, violin
- Robert Lamm – piano
- Jay Leonhart – upright bass
- Jody Linscott – percussion
- Gerard McMahon – guitar, keyboards, musical director, backing vocals
- Billy Nicholls – backing vocals
- Thommy Price – drums
- Dave Ruffy – drums
- Jenny Ruffy – backing vocals
- Shaun Solomon – bass
- Pat Sommers – backing vocals
- John Van Eps – keyboards, programming, Synclavier
- Vinnie Zummo – flamenco guitar, soloist

== Charts ==
Chart (1992)	Peak position
Canada Top Albums/CDs (RPM)	83
