= Can't Wait to See the Movie =

Studio album by Roger Daltrey
- Released: 4 June 1987
- Recorded: 1986–87
- Studios: At various studios in London and Los Angeles
- Genres: Rock; pop rock; electronic; synthpop
- Length: 45:45
- Labels: Atlantic (1987 LP and Cassettes); Rhino (1987 CD format); Virgin (outside US/Canada)
- Producers: Alan Shacklock; David Foster; Jimmy Scott; Chas Sandford

Roger Daltrey chronology
Under a Raging Moon (1985)	Can't Wait to See the Movie (1987)	Best of Rockers & Ballads (1991)

Singles from Can't Wait to See the Movie
- 1. "Take Me Home" Released: 4 June 1987 (US); 2. "Hearts of Fire" Released: 22 June 1987 (UK)

Professional ratings
Review scores
Source	Rating
AllMusic	1.5/5 stars

Can't Wait to See the Movie is the seventh solo studio album by the English singer, songwriter and actor Roger Daltrey, the lead vocalist for the Who. It was released in June 1987 by Atlantic Records, and was primarily produced by Alan Shacklock, in association with David Foster, Chas Sanford and Jimmy Scott. Among the songs Daltrey is credited as co-writer on two tracks "Balance on Wires" and "Take Me Home". David Foster co-wrote the track "The Price of Love", which was also featured in the 1987 movie The Secret of My Success, starring Michael J. Fox.

Can't Wait to See the Movie is a pop album that incorporates some genres such as funk, rock, and jazz, and it makes prominent use of synthesizers. The album was received negatively by the majority of music critics, with some critics describing its music as inauthentic and bemoaning the production as too polished. It was also a commercial disappointment, missing the album charts in Europe and the US. One critic referred to it as "Can't Wait to Sell the Record," while other reviewers noted good points to the recordings. When asked about the album at the time, Daltrey said that "It's amazing after all these years how everything can become new and fun again."

== Composition ==
The album's only UK top 100 hit, "Hearts of Fire", was written by Russ Ballard. Ballard played guitar on this track, as well as providing backing vocals. Ballard also wrote and performed on Daltrey's first two solo studio albums, Daltrey (1973) and Ride a Rock Horse (1975). Daltrey recorded some other Ballard originals for his McVicar soundtrack and his previous studio album Under a Raging Moon. This album remains his final contribution from Ballard.

== Critical reception ==
Reviewing for AllMusic, critic Mike DeGagne wrote of the album "Knowing the potential that is harnessed within Daltrey, his half-hearted attempts at unleashing the pains built up by failed romances doesn't add up to much. Some uplifting sax played by Gary Barnacle keeps the album from being a total write-off as it surfaces here and there, but a lifeless array of synthesizers droning in the backdrop of every song nullifies even the smallest asset, while adding to the pretentiousness."

== Track listing ==
The original US album track listing is as follows:

Side one
No.	Title	Writer(s)	Length
1.	"Hearts of Fire"	Russ Ballard	5:06
2.	"When the Thunder Comes"	Damon Metrebian; Chas Sandford	3:39
3.	"Ready for Love"	Kit Hain	3:28
4.	"Balance on Wires"	Daltrey; Don Snow	6:22
5.	"Miracle of Love"	Mark Morgan; Jimmy Scott	4:38

Side two
No.	Title	Writer(s)	Length
6.	"The Price of Love"	Jack Blades; David Foster	4:16
7.	"The Heart Has Its Reasons"	Jimmy Scott	4:11
8.	"Alone in the Night"	Steve Bates; Larry Lee; Tom Whitlock; Richie Zito	4:27
9.	"Lover's Storm"	Tom Kelly; Gary Usher	3:53
10.	"Take Me Home"	Axel Bauer; Daltrey; Michel Eli; Nigel Hinton	5:45
Total length:			45:45

== Personnel ==
Musicians

- Roger Daltrey – lead vocals, backing vocals
- David Foster – keyboards
- Nick Glennie-Smith – keyboards
- Mark Morgan – keyboards
- Don Snow – keyboards
- John Van Tongeren – keyboards
- Russ Ballard – guitar, backing vocals
- Gary Grainger – guitar
- Michael Landau – guitar
- Clem Clempson – guitar
- Chas Sandford – guitar
- Chris Sandford – guitar
- Phil Brown – bass guitar, guitar, rhythm guitar
- John Siegler – bass guitar
- Tris Imboden – drums, drum overdubs
- Tony Beard – drums, rums
- Martin Ditcham – percussion
- Rev. Dave Boruff – saxophone, synthesizer
- Gary Barnacle – saxophone
- Bimbo Acock – saxophone
- Chris Eaton – backing vocals
- Lance Ellington – backing vocals
- John Payne – backing vocals
- Jimmy Scott – backing vocals
- Miriam Stockley – backing vocals
- Mark Williamson – backing vocals
- Annie McCaig – backing vocals
- Joho Payee – backing vocals

Production and artwork

- Alan Shacklock – record producer
- David Foster – record producer
- Jimmy Scott – executive producer
- Chas Sandford – executive producer
- Noel Harris – production assistant
- Paul Batchelor – production assistant
- Mark Frank – engineer
- Richard Niles – horn arrangements
- Michael Boddicker – synthesizer programming
- Marc A. Frank – remixing
- Graham Hughes – concept, photography
- "Ozzie" – artwork, typesetting
- Garnet Warren – design, typography

== Charts ==
Chart (1987)	Peak position
Swedish Albums (Sverigetopplistan)	41

== See also ==
- Roger Daltrey discography
