= Quicksilver (film) =

1986 film by Thomas Michael Donnelly

- Theatrical release poster
- Directed by: Thomas Michael Donnelly
- Written by: Thomas Michael Donnelly
- Produced by: Daniel Melnick; Michael I. Rachmil
- Starring: Kevin Bacon; Jami Gertz; Paul Rodriguez
- Cinematography: Thomas Del Ruth
- Edited by: Tom Rolf
- Music by: Tony Banks
- Production companies: Delphi V Productions; IndieProd Company Productions
- Distributed by: Columbia Pictures
- Release date: February 14, 1986
- Running time: 106 minutes
- Country: United States
- Language: English
- Budget: $10 million
- Box office: $7,246,979

Quicksilver is a 1986 American drama film written and directed by Thomas Michael Donnelly and starring Kevin Bacon. The film, which was distributed by Columbia Pictures, also stars Jami Gertz, Paul Rodriguez, Louie Anderson, Laurence Fishburne, and Rudy Ramos.

== Plot ==
"Smiling" Jack Casey is a young floor trader on the Pacific Exchange who loses all of his company's and family's savings on a risky trade. Deflated and disenchanted with his profession, he quits his job and becomes a bicycle messenger in San Francisco. Casey has to deal with his parents and his girlfriend, who are disappointed with his new job. Along with the colorful characters that work with him, he saves a troubled young woman named Terri from a gang.

Although frustrated, Casey enjoys the freedom that comes with his lower responsibility. He also uses his education and business acumen to help his coworkers. When some of them are involved in dangerous or difficult matters, Casey must decide whether he should become involved. Those matters lead to a sinister web of murder and intrigue.

Casey returns to the floor of the exchange for a day, buying shares of a plummeting penny stock and holding on until it recovers. He thus restores his family's fortune and enables his bike-messenger friend, Hector, to afford the hot dog stand he has dreamed of. Terri is again menaced by drug dealer Gypsy but is rescued by Casey's fellow bike messengers. In retaliation against Gypsy, Casey engages in an extended car-versus-bike car chase that ends with Gypsy driving off the end of an uncompleted highway. The film flashes forward to Casey applying for 'normal' jobs and Terri deciding to become a paramedic, and the pair buying hot dogs from Hector.

== Cast ==
- Kevin Bacon as Jack Casey
- Jami Gertz as Terri
- Paul Rodriguez as Hector Rodriguez
- Rudy Ramos as Gypsy
- Andrew Smith as Gabe Kaplan
- Gerald S. O'Loughlin as Mr. Casey
- Larry Fishburne as Voodoo
- David Harris as Apache
- Charles McCaughan as Airborne
- Louis Anderson as Tiny
- Whitney Kershaw as Rand
- Joshua Shelley as Shorty
- Georgann Johnson as Mrs. Casey

== Music ==
The film's theme song is "Quicksilver Lightning" by Giorgio Moroder and Dean Pitchford. Performed by Roger Daltrey of the Who, it was a minor hit on the pop charts. The film score was composed by Tony Banks, of Genesis fame. Other music is contributed by performers such as Ray Parker Jr. and Peter Frampton. "The Motown Song" would later be a hit for Rod Stewart with the Temptations.

=== Soundtrack ===
1. "Quicksilver Lightning" – Roger Daltrey
2. "Casual Thing" – Fiona
3. "Nothing At All" – Peter Frampton
4. "Shortcut to Somewhere" – Fish and Tony Banks
5. "Through the Night (Love Song from Quicksilver)" – John Parr and Marilyn Martin
6. "One Sunny Day/Dueling Bikes from Quicksilver" – Ray Parker Jr. and Helen Terry
7. "The Motown Song" – Larry John McNally
8. "Suite Streets-From Quicksilver" – Thomas Newman
9. "Quicksilver Suite I/Rebirth/The Gypsy" – Tony Banks
10. "Quicksilver Suite II/Crash Landing" – Tony Banks

== Home media ==
The DVD for Quicksilver was released in December 2002 by Sony Pictures Home Entertainment.

== Reception ==
The film received negative reviews and as of July 2024 has a 13% rating on Rotten Tomatoes, based on 16 reviews.

In The New York Times, Walter Goodman wrote "As long as the characters are doing stunts or whizzing impossibly through city traffic to a strong rock beat, there's something to watch. For the rest of the time, Quicksilver is as much fun as a slow leak.". In a two-star review, Roger Ebert wrote "The movie has moments when it comes to life, when it threatens to tell a story about interesting people, and then it wanders off into inane scenes designed only to sell records."

== See also ==
- List of films about bicycles and cycling
