= Under a Raging Moon (song) =

Single by Roger Daltrey

from the album Under a Raging Moon
- Released: 24 February 1986
- Recorded: 1985
- Genre: Rock; pop rock
- Length: 6:42
- Label: 10; Atlantic
- Songwriters: Julia Downes; John Parr
- Producer: Alan Shacklock

Roger Daltrey singles chronology
"Let Me Down Easy" (1985)	"Under a Raging Moon" (1986)	"The Pride You Hide" (1986)

Official audio
- "Under a Raging Moon" on YouTube

"Under a Raging Moon" is a song by the English rock singer Roger Daltrey, the lead vocalist of the Who. This song is the tenth and title track on Daltrey's sixth solo studio album, Under a Raging Moon (1985).

The single reached No. 43 on the UK singles chart and No. 10 on the Billboard's Mainstream Rock charts, but failed to chart on the US pop singles chart.

The song was written by John Parr (of "St. Elmo's Fire (Man in Motion)" fame) and Julia Downes. It is a tribute to the Who's former drummer, Keith Moon, who died in 1978. It was said that the Who's bass guitarist John Entwistle had wanted to play this song instead of "Won't Get Fooled Again" when the band performed at Live Aid in July 1985, but guitarist Pete Townshend disagreed. Entwistle decided to record his own version on his live solo album Left for Live (1999) as a further tribute to Moon.

== Critical reception ==
Mike DeGagne of AllMusic reviewed the recording, stating "Daltrey's thunderous but passionate ode to his former friend and drummer Keith Moon is a fervent downpour of frustration that can be truly felt inside every line of the song. A spectacular drum solo from Mark Brzezicki is a modest tribute to the late Moon and adds depth." Additionally, Rolling Stone's review said, "Parr's entry is the heartfelt title track, a clunky, roaring number that mourns Keith Moon with more sentiment than clarity. A bombastic hodgepodge salvaged by a passionate vocal, "Under a Raging Moon" unabashedly quotes "Baba O'Riley" and – in an old-fashioned bit of show-stopping theatre – employs seven drummers, including Stewart Copeland, Carl Palmer and Martin Chambers, each of whom plays a section of the elegy."

== Personnel ==
- Roger Daltrey – lead and backing vocals
- Robbie McIntosh – guitars
- Mark Brzezicki – drums
- John Siegler – bass
- Alan Shacklock – keyboards, sequencing, Fairlight CMI
- Nick Glennie-Smith – keyboards, sequencing
- Steve Rance – Fairlight CMI
- John Parr – backing vocals
- Mark Williamson – backing vocals
- John Payne – backing vocals
- Annie McCaig – backing vocals
- Drummers in order of performance:
  - Martin Chambers (The Pretenders)
  - Roger Taylor (Queen)
  - Cozy Powell (various rock and metal projects)
  - Stewart Copeland (The Police)
  - Zak Starkey (son of Ringo Starr, Keith Moon's drumming pupil, future drummer in John Entwistle's band The Rock, future drummer with The Who)
  - Carl Palmer (The Crazy World of Arthur Brown; Atomic Rooster; Emerson, Lake & Palmer; Asia)
  - Mark Brzezicki (Big Country, session drummer)
  - Mark Brzezicki and Zak Starkey – outro
