= Alan Shacklock =

Musical artist (born 1950)

- Born: Alan Albert Shacklock; 20 June 1950 (age 76); Kingsbury, North London, England
- Genres: Rock; pop
- Occupations: Musician; songwriter; record producer
- Instruments: Guitar; keyboards; vocals
- Label: Various
- Member of: Babe Ruth
- Formerly of: The Strangers / The Juniors (UK); The Hi-Numbers; The Favourite Sons; The Gods; Chris Farlowe and the Thunderbirds; Shacklock
- Website: alanshacklock.com

Alan Albert Shacklock (born 20 June 1950) is an English musician, composer, arranger and recording producer, who lives and works in Nashville, Tennessee. His 1972 song "The Mexican" as performed by Babe Ruth is considered influential in the early development of b-boying and hip-hop culture.

== Life and career ==
Alan Shacklock was born in London and began playing guitar as a child. His first band was The Juniors, which included the Rolling Stones' guitarist Mick Taylor and Jethro Tull bassist John Glascock. He then joined Chris Farlowe's Thunderbirds. Shacklock later completed classical guitar and lute studies at the Royal Academy of Music in London, graduating with a master's degree in music.

Well-noted for never being seen without a hat, in 1969 Shacklock played in a band called The Gods, and in 1971 formed the band Babe Ruth. He worked as the group's songwriter and producer from 1971 to 1975, and then left to work as a solo songwriter and record producer. He has received four Grammy Award nominations, and has produced a number of silver, gold and platinum recordings for artists, including Mike Oldfield, Bonnie Tyler, Jeff Beck (of the Yardbirds), Meat Loaf, the Alarm, the Look, Roger Daltrey (of the Who), JoBoxers and Sir Andrew Lloyd Webber.

Shacklock has also produced music for films, including Quicksilver (starring Kevin Bacon), Doc Hollywood (starring Michael J. Fox) and Buddy's Song (starring Chesney Hawkes and Roger Daltrey). He composed original scores for the BBC/PBS wildlife documentaries Puffins and One Man's Island for The Natural World. The scores were performed by the London Symphony and Royal Philharmonic Orchestras, and premiered at the Royal Festival Hall in London. In 1994, Shacklock also composed the original score for the FIFA World Cup. With Sir George Martin, he was a founder of the British Record Producers Guild.

The band Babe Ruth reunited in 2006 and produced a new album of songs, Que Pasa, written by Shacklock, followed by concert dates in 2010.

== Awards ==
Shacklock received EMI's Songwriter of the Year Award for the number one Christian hit "The True Believers", released in 1995 by Christian artist Phil Keaggy.
