= Roger Daltrey =

English musician and songwriter (born 1944)

Sir Roger Daltrey CBE
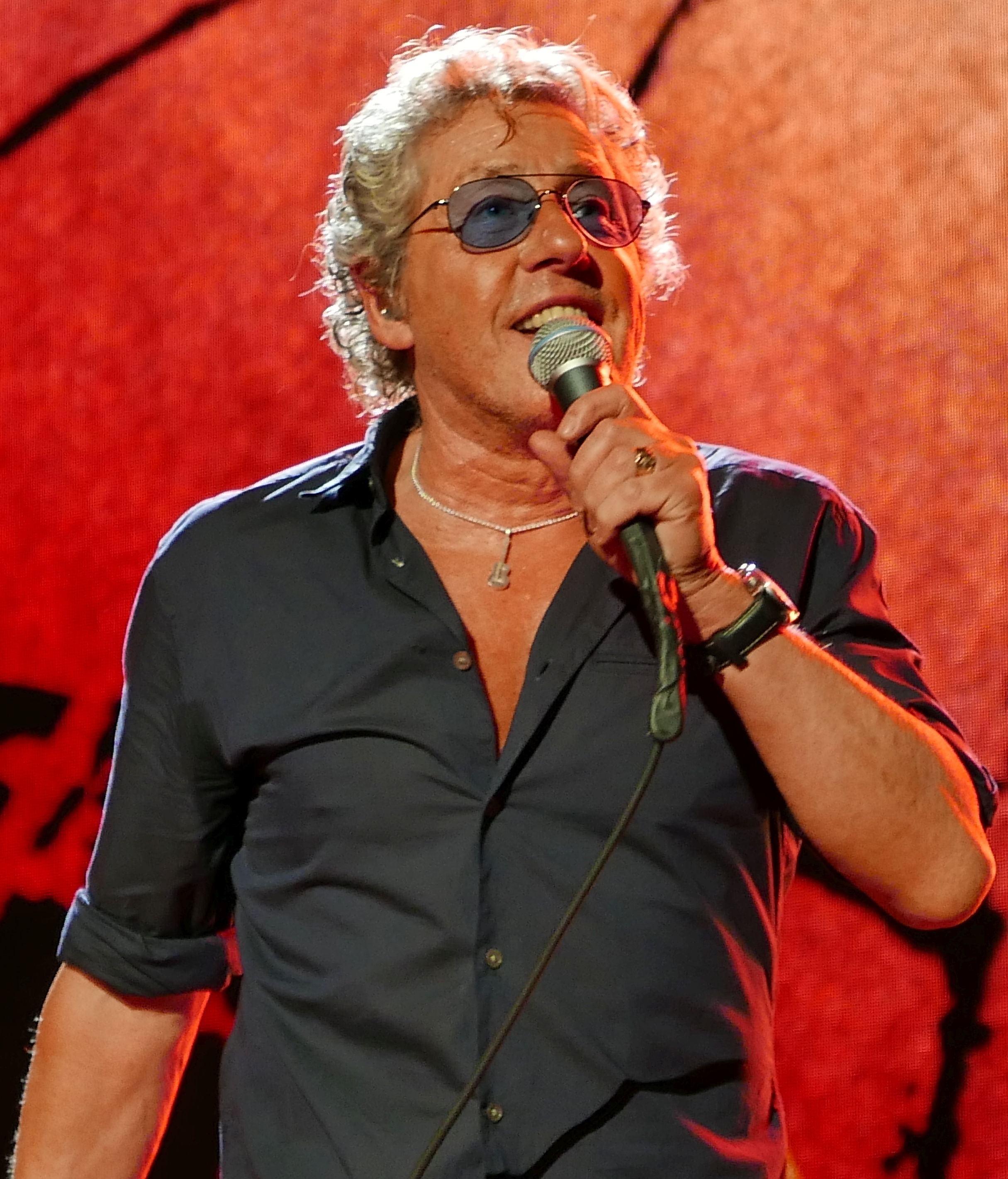
- Daltrey performing in 2016

Background information
- Born: Roger Harry Daltrey; 1 March 1944 (age 82); East Acton, London, England
- Genres: Rock; art rock; hard rock; soft rock; power pop
- Occupations: Singer; musician; songwriter; actor; film producer
- Instruments: Vocals; guitar; harmonica
- Works: Solo; with the Who
- Years active: 1959–present
- Labels: Track; MCA; Polydor; Atlantic; WEA; Rhino; Sanctuary
- Member of: The Who; No Plan B
- Formerly of: The RD Crusaders
- Spouses: Jaquelin Rickman (m. 1964; div. 1968) Heather Taylor (m. 1971)
- Website: thewho.com

Sir Roger Harry Daltrey (born 1 March 1944) is an English singer, songwriter and actor. He is the co-founder and lead vocalist of the rock band the Who, known for his powerful voice and charismatic stage presence. His stage persona earned him a position as one of the "gods of rock and roll".

Daltrey's hit songs with the Who include "My Generation", "Pinball Wizard", "Won't Get Fooled Again", "Baba O'Riley", "Who Are You" and "You Better You Bet". He began a solo career in 1973 while still a member of the Who, and has released ten solo studio albums, five compilation albums and one live album. His solo hits include "Giving It All Away", "Free Me", "Without Your Love", "Walking in My Sleep", "After the Fire" and "Under a Raging Moon".

The Who are considered one of the most influential rock bands of the 20th century and have sold over 100 million records worldwide. As a member of the band, Daltrey received a Lifetime achievement award from the British Phonographic Industry in 1988, and from the Grammy Foundation in 2001. He was inducted into the Rock and Roll Hall of Fame in 1990, and the UK Music Hall of Fame in 2005. He and Pete Townshend received Kennedy Center Honors in 2008, and The George and Ira Gershwin Award for Lifetime Musical Achievement at UCLA on 21 May 2016.

Daltrey was ranked number 61 on Rolling Stone's list of the 100 greatest singers of all time in 2008; Planet Rock listeners voted him rock's fifth-greatest voice in 2009. Daltrey has also been an actor and film producer, with roles in films, theatre, and television. In June 2025 Daltrey was appointed a Knight Bachelor in the Birthday Honours for services to charity and music.

== Early life ==
Roger Harry Daltrey was born on 1 March 1944 at Hammersmith Hospital in East Acton, London, during a Second World War bombing raid. He is the eldest of three children of Harry and Irene Daltrey, and has two younger sisters. His father, an insurance clerk, was called up to fight in the Second World War, and three-month-old Roger and his mother were evacuated to a farm in Scotland.

Daltrey attended Victoria Primary School and Acton County Grammar School in West London, the same school that Pete Townshend and John Entwistle attended, though a year above the two. He showed academic promise in the English state school system and was top of his class in the eleven-plus examination, after which he went to Grammar School.

Daltrey made his first guitar, a cherry red Stratocaster replica, himself in 1957. His father bought him an Epiphone guitar in 1959 and he formed the Detours (later The Who) in 1961 with bassist Entwistle.

He also became the band's leader, and gained a reputation for using his fists to impose discipline. According to Townshend, who joined in 1962, Daltrey "ran things the way he wanted. If you argued with him, you usually got a bunch of fives, [a hard punch]". Daltrey explained, later in life, that this harsh approach came from the tough neighbourhood in which he had grown up, where arguments were resolved by fighting. He was expelled from school, and Townshend wrote in his autobiography, "until he was expelled, Roger had been a good pupil."

They discovered in 1964 that another band was performing as the Detours, and discussed changing their name. Townshend suggested "the Hair" and Townshend's room-mate Richard Barnes suggested "the Who". The next morning, Daltrey made the decision for the band, saying "It's the Who, innit?"

== The Who ==
=== Overview ===
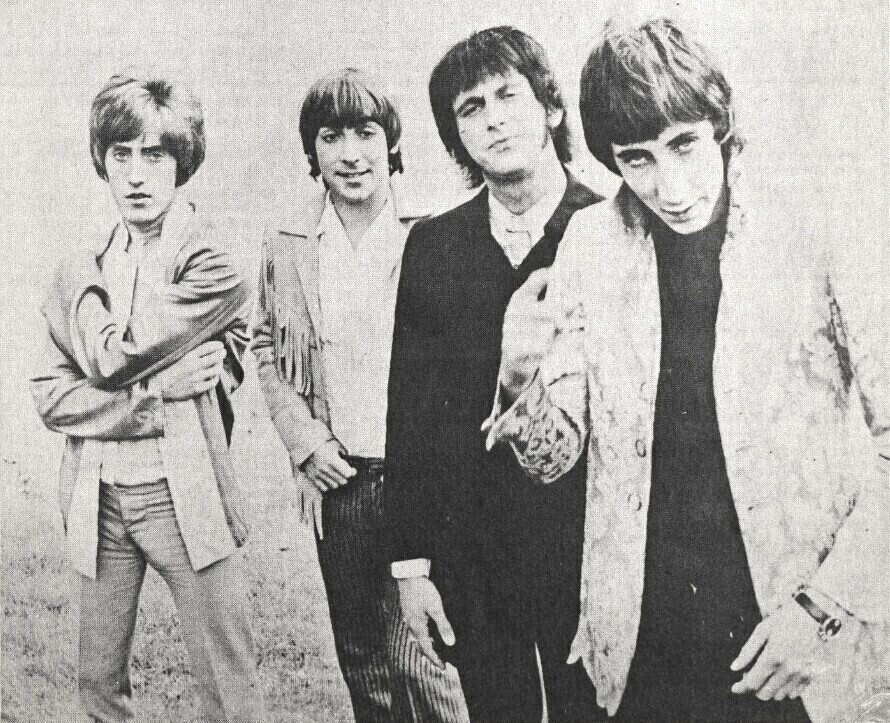
Daltrey (far left) with the Who c. 1967

Townshend began writing original material for the band, and after they received a recording contract and first hit single ("I Can't Explain") in early 1965, Daltrey's dominance over the band diminished. The other members of the Who fired him from the band in late 1965 after he beat up drummer Keith Moon for supplying illegal drugs to Townshend and Entwistle, but he was re-admitted to the band a week later on probation after he promised not to do it again. He recalled, "I thought if I lost the band, I was dead. If I didn't stick with the Who, I would be a sheet metal worker for the rest of my life."

The band's second single, "Anyway, Anyhow, Anywhere", was a collaboration between Daltrey and Townshend. Alongside Townshend developing into an accomplished composer was Daltrey gaining a reputation as a singer and front-man. The Who's stage act was energetic, and Daltrey's habit of swinging the microphone around by its cord on stage became a signature move. His stuttering, youthful vocals evoked a pioneering frustration and arrogance in the band's breakthrough 1965 single, "My Generation". In the 1970s, his matured, imposing vocal style was lauded by critics and his scream near the end of "Won't Get Fooled Again" was called a "defining moment in rock and roll".

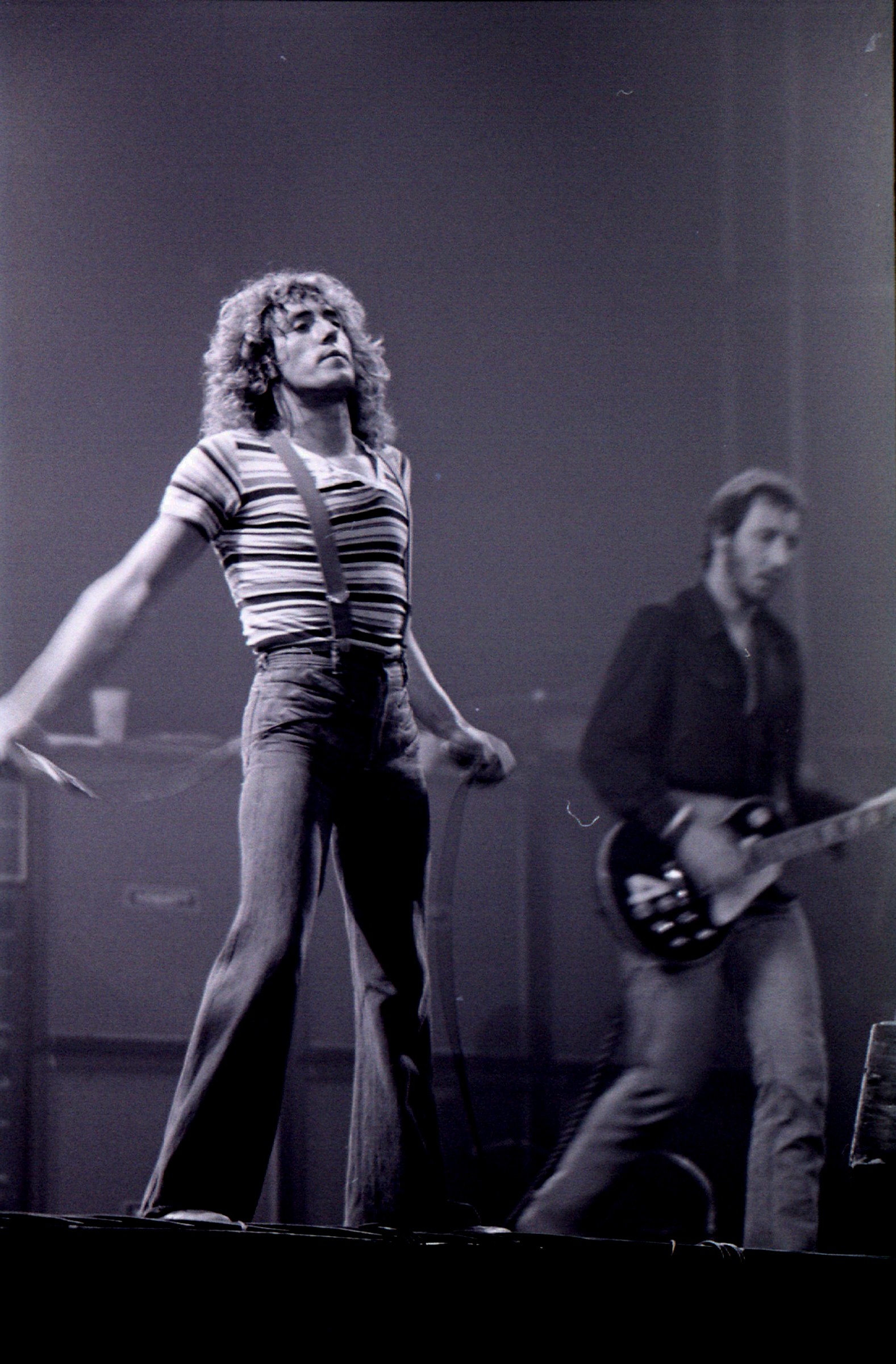
Daltrey onstage with Pete Townshend, 1976

By 1973, Daltrey was experiencing success with his solo projects and acting roles. While the other members of the band were recording the music for their sixth studio album Quadrophenia, he took the opportunity to examine the Who's financial books and found they had fallen into disarray under the management of Kit Lambert and Chris Stamp. Lambert was Pete Townshend's artistic mentor, and challenging him led to renewed tension within the band. During a filming session, in an incident that Daltrey later claimed was overblown, Townshend and Daltrey argued over the schedule, Townshend hit Daltrey over the head with his guitar, and Daltrey responded by knocking Townshend unconscious with a single blow.

When Ken Russell's adaptation of Tommy appeared as a feature film in 1975, Daltrey played the lead role. He was nominated for a Golden Globe Award for "Best Acting Debut in a Motion Picture", and appeared on the cover of Rolling Stone magazine on 10 April 1975. He worked with Russell again, starring as Franz Liszt in Lisztomania, and collaborated with Rick Wakeman on the soundtrack of the film.

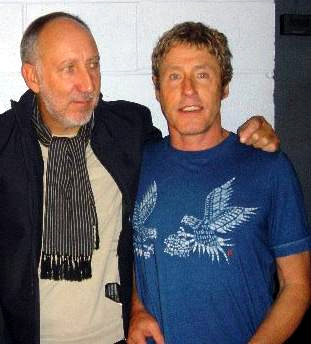
Daltrey (right) with Pete Townshend, 2004

The Who's drummer, Keith Moon, died in 1978. The band continued working after his death, but Daltrey thought that new drummer Kenney Jones had been the wrong choice. The Who broke up in 1983 when Townshend felt that he could no longer write for them.

The band reformed in 1989 for a 25th Anniversary Tour, which also celebrated the 20th anniversary of their rock opera Tommy. The tour featured a large backing band, with guest appearances by Steve Winwood, Patti LaBelle, Phil Collins, Elton John, and Billy Idol. Daltrey managed to complete the tour in spite of an abdominal ailment, for which he later received surgery.

In 1996, Pete Townshend was approached to produce Quadrophenia for the Prince's Trust concert at Hyde Park, London. Daltrey agreed to help to produce a one-off performance, and the opera was to be performed with a large backing band. On the night before the show, Daltrey was struck in the face by a microphone stand swung by Gary Glitter and the accident fractured his eye socket. There was concern that he might not be able to perform, but Daltrey covered the bruises with an eye patch and completed the show as scheduled. Townshend took the production on tour in 1996–97 as the Who.

After the success of the Quadrophenia tour, the band returned as the Who with a five-piece line-up for tours in 1999–2000, and they made a major impact at the Concert for New York City in 2002. After Entwistle's death in June 2002, Daltrey and Townshend decided to continue with an already planned tour, with bassist Pino Palladino taking Entwistle's place. They also completed a brief tour in 2004. In 2006, they released the Who's first studio album of new material in twenty-four years, Endless Wire, which led to suggestions that the much-discussed artistic tension in the Who lay between Daltrey and Townshend. The band undertook a world tour in 2006–07 in support of the album.

In February 2010, Townshend and Daltrey, headlining as the Who, performed the half-time show at Super Bowl XLIV in Miami Gardens, Florida, and were seen by 105.97 million viewers across the world. In March 2010, Townshend and Daltrey, with an extensive backing band, performed Quadrophenia at the Royal Albert Hall in London as a tenth-anniversary charity benefit for the Teenage Cancer Trust. Eddie Vedder of Pearl Jam sang the part of the Godfather and Tom Meighan of Kasabian sang the part of Aceface.

=== Songwriting ===
Daltrey wrote several songs in the band's catalogue during their early years:

- "Anyway, Anyhow, Anywhere" (1965) – the Who's second single, co-written with Townshend.
- "See My Way" (1966) – Daltrey's contribution to A Quick One.
- "Early Morning Cold Taxi" (1967) – Outtake from The Who Sell Out (later appearing as a bonus track on deluxe editions and on the 1994 box set Thirty Years of Maximum R&B), co-written with David "Cyrano" Langston.
- "Here for More" (1970) – B-side to "The Seeker".

Daltrey also wrote a song titled "Crossroads Now" for the Who, which grew from an onstage jam in 1999. Another Daltrey song, "Certified Rose", was rehearsed by the Who shortly before the death of John Entwistle. The band had intended to play it, as well as Townshend's "Real Good Looking Boy", during their 2002 tour, but it was dropped after Entwistle's death. It was rumoured that a studio version had been recorded during the Endless Wire sessions which may have featured Entwistle's basslines from 2002, but Townshend later stated that no such recording had been made. A more recent recording of "Certified Rose" was released on Daltrey's tenth solo studio album, As Long As I Have You (2018).

== Solo career ==
=== Overview ===
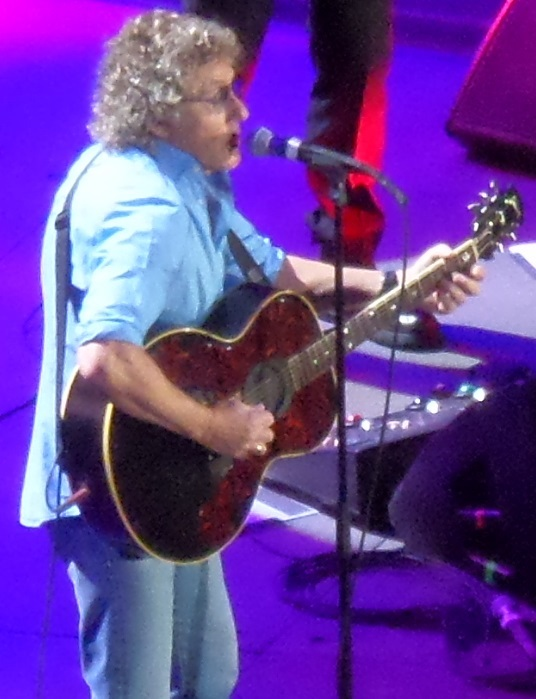
Daltrey with the Who at the Manchester Arena, 2014

Daltrey has released ten solo studio albums. His debut, Daltrey (1973), was recorded during a hiatus in the Who's touring schedule. The best-selling single from the album, "Giving It All Away", peaked at No. 5 in the UK and the album, which introduced Leo Sayer and David Courtney as songwriters, made the Top 50 in the United States. The inner sleeve photography showed a trompe-l'œil which referred to the Narcissus myth, as Daltrey's reflection in the water differed from his actual appearance. He also released a single in 1973, "Thinking", with "There Is Love" on the B-side featuring Jimmy Page of Led Zeppelin on guitar. The British release, with considerable airplay of "Giving It All Away" (first lines "I paid all my dues so I picked up my shoes, I got up and walked away") coincided with news reports of the Who being sued for unpaid damage to their hotel on a recent tour, which included a TV set thrown out of a window.

Daltrey's second solo studio album, Ride a Rock Horse, was released in July 1975. It was his second most commercially successful solo album.

When Leo Sayer launched his own career as a singer, Daltrey called on a widening group of friends to write for and perform on his albums. Paul McCartney contributed the new song "Giddy" to One of the Boys (1977), where the band included Hank Marvin of the Shadows, Eric Clapton, Alvin Lee and Mick Ronson, as well as calling on a member of the Who, John Entwistle.

McVicar (1980) was a soundtrack album from the film of the same name, in which Daltrey starred and also co-produced; it featured all the other members of the Who at that time (Townshend, Entwistle, and Kenney Jones). McVicar included two hit singles, "Free Me", and "Without Your Love", Daltrey's best-selling solo recording.

His fifth solo studio album, Parting Should Be Painless (1984), received negative reviews and was his poorest-selling studio album up to that point. In it, Daltrey had vented his frustrations after the break-up of the Who by assembling a set of roughly autobiographical songs. They included a track contributed by Bryan Ferry ("Going Strong"), and a cover version of the Eurythmics ("Somebody Told Me"). Daltrey said the album covered musical areas that he had wanted the Who to pursue. The title track of the next studio album, Under a Raging Moon (1985) was a tribute to the Who's drummer, Keith Moon, who had died in 1978 at the age of 32.

Daltrey's final studio album of the 1980s, Can't Wait to See the Movie (1987), featured the track "The Price of Love", co-written by David Foster which was also featured in the 1987 movie The Secret of My Success, starring Michael J. Fox.

On his only studio album of the 1990s, Rocks in the Head (1992), Daltrey's voice ranged from a powerful bluesy growl in the style of Howlin' Wolf, to tender vocals shared with his daughter Willow on the ballad "Everything a Heart Could Ever Want".

Daltrey appeared in the Freddie Mercury Tribute Concert in 1992, singing the hard rock Queen song "I Want It All", in homage to his friend Freddie Mercury who had died the previous year one day after a public announcement that he had AIDS.

To celebrate his 50th birthday in 1994, Daltrey performed two shows at Carnegie Hall in New York City. A recording of the concerts was later issued on CD and video, entitled A Celebration: The Music of Pete Townshend and The Who, and is sometimes called Daltrey Sings Townshend. The success of these shows led to a US tour under the same name, featuring Pete Townshend's brother Simon on lead guitar. Phil Spalding played bass in the first half of each show and John Entwistle played bass in the second half. An Australian leg was considered but eventually scrapped.

A fan of the Premier League football club Arsenal F.C., Daltrey wrote and performed a specially commissioned song, "Highbury Highs", for the 2006 Highbury Farewell ceremony after the final football match was played at the Highbury ground. Daltrey's performance was part of Arsenal's celebration of the club's 93 years at Highbury as it prepared to move to a new stadium.

Daltrey embarked on a solo tour of the US and Canada on 10 October 2009, the "Use It or Lose It" tour, with a new touring band he called "No Plan B" on The Alan Titchmarsh Show. The band included Simon Townshend on rhythm guitar and backing vocals, Frank Simes on lead guitar, Jon Button on bass guitar, Loren Gold on keyboards, and Scott Devours on drums. Eddie Vedder made a guest appearance at the Seattle show on 12 October. In 2010, Daltrey and No Plan B appeared for several dates with Eric Clapton, including Summerfest held in Milwaukee, Wisconsin.

On 15 March 2018, Daltrey announced the forthcoming release on 1 June of a new solo studio album, As Long as I Have You. He appeared on BBC One's The Graham Norton Show on 13 April 2018 to promote the single taken from the album.

In May 2021, Daltrey announced a return to touring, with the solo Live and Kicking Tour, starting in August 2021. The tour was rescheduled and carried out during the summer of 2022.

== Collaborations ==
In 1998, Daltrey performed two songs with the Jim Byrnes Blues Band at the Los Angeles Highlander Convention.

On 12 January 2009, he headlined a one-off concert with Babyshambles at the O2 Academy Bristol for Teenage Cancer Trust. On 5 July 2009, he joined the Jam's lead vocalist, Paul Weller, on stage at Hop Farm Festival in Paddock Wood, Kent for an encore of "Magic Bus". In 2011, Daltrey recorded a duet on the song "Ma seule amour" with French singer and composer Laurent Voulzy for his seventh studio album Lys and Love.

In November 2014, while staying at the Mar Hall Hotel in Bishopton, Renfrewshire, ahead of the Who's gig at the SSE Hydro in Glasgow, Scotland, Daltrey joined local band Milestone for an impromptu rendition of "I Can't Explain". The band were playing at a wedding reception in the hotel.

== Legacy ==
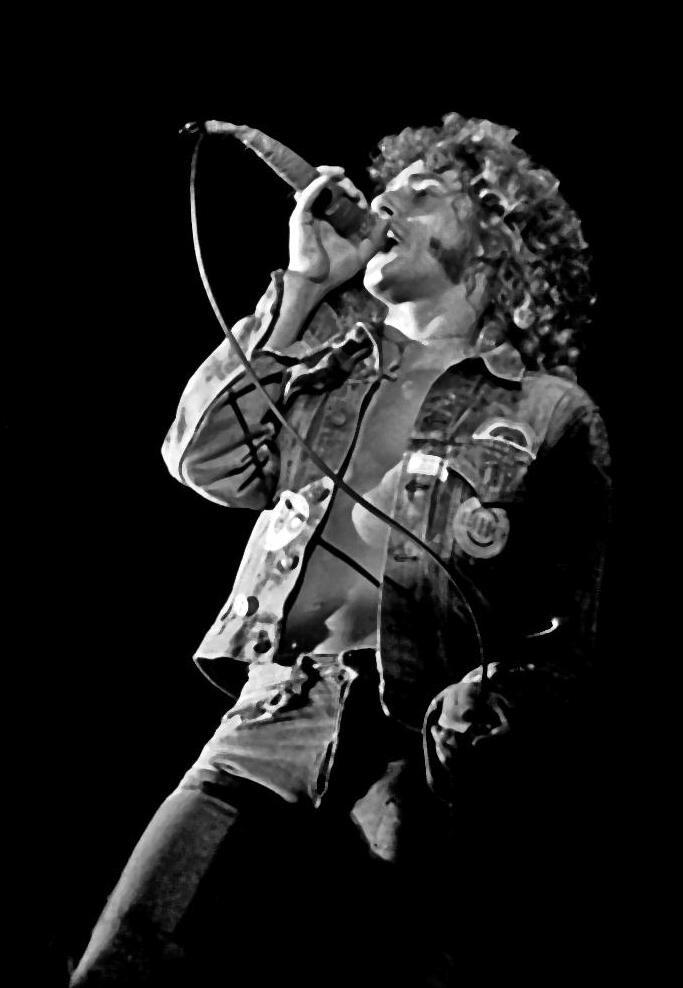
Daltrey singing with the Who in Hamburg, Germany, 1972

Pete Townshend said Daltrey had "almost invented the pseudo-messianic role taken up later by Jim Morrison [of the Doors] and Robert Plant [of Led Zeppelin]". His stage persona earned him a position as one of the "gods of rock and roll". He developed a trademark move of swinging and throwing his microphone through a complex sequence, matching these sequences with the tempo of the song that was being played, although Daltrey reduced the athleticism of his performances in later years. According to a review of the Who's performance at the Quart Festival in 2007:

Suddenly each and everyone stopped caring about the down-pouring rain. When the Who took the stage we couldn't do anything but to reach for the sky and howl. Anyone who has ever thought of calling these gods old men and dinosaurs should be deeply ashamed. The reports we've heard from around the world were true: Live rock doesn't get any better.

== Equipment ==
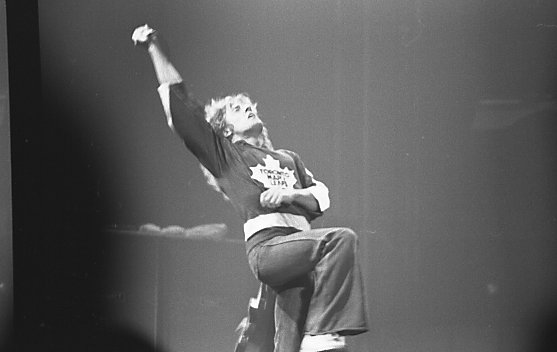
Daltrey performing onstage at Maple Leaf Gardens in Toronto, Ontario, Canada, 1976

Daltrey hand-built his first guitar from a piece of plywood, and he also built guitars for the band in the early days when they had little money to buy equipment. As lead guitarist for the Detours, Daltrey played a 1961 Epiphone Wilshire solid-body electric guitar, which he later sold to Pete Townshend on an easy payment plan. After he took over as the band's vocalist in the 1960s, and during the 1970s, Daltrey rarely played guitar on stage, except for a Martin acoustic guitar he used while promoting his debut solo studio album Daltrey (1973). He began playing guitar with the Who again during the band's tours in the 1980s, and used a Fender Esquire to play a second guitar part for the song "Eminence Front" on the Who's 1982, 1989 and later tours. During the 1989 tour, Daltrey played a Gibson Chet Atkins SST guitar for the song "Hey Joe". During the Who's 1996–97 Quadrophenia tour, he played a Gibson J-200 acoustic guitar.

After 1999, it became common for Daltrey to play guitar during both the Who and solo shows. He played a Versoul Buxom 6 handmade acoustic guitar on the Who's 2002 tour. Daltrey owns a Gibson Everly Brothers Flattop acoustic guitar which he played on the Who and solo tours in the late first decade of the 21st century. On his 2009 tour, he played Pete Townshend's "Blue, Red and Grey" on an Ashbury cutaway tenor EQ ukulele.

Daltrey is among those who brought the harmonica into British popular music. Harmonica brands he has used include Hohner and Lee Oskar.

Daltrey uses Shure microphones. Their cords are taped to strengthen the connection to the microphone and to avoid cutting his hands when he swings and catches it. He commonly uses a standard Shure SM58, but has also used Shure SM78 (in 1981), Shure model 565D Unisphere 1, and Shure model 548 Unidyne IV. Daltrey also uses a hybrid monitoring system, with one in-ear monitor supplemented by floor wedges.

== Published writing ==
Daltrey contributed to a collection of childhood fishing stories published in 1996 entitled I Remember: Reflections on Fishing in Childhood. In 2009, he contributed a foreword to Anyway, Anyhow, Anywhere: The Complete Chronicle of the Who 1958–1978 by Andrew Neill and Matt Kent. In 2011, he wrote a tribute article in honour of the late Ken Russell which was published in Britain's Daily Express.

In October 2018, Daltrey published his memoir, Thanks a Lot Mr. Kibblewhite: My Story. The title is a reference to the man who threw him out of grammar school, enabling him to go into a successful music career.

== Awards and achievements ==
In 1976 Daltrey was nominated for a Golden Globe Award for "Best Acting Debut in a Motion Picture" for his starring role in the film version of the Who's rock opera Tommy. He also performed as a guest on the Chieftains' recording of Irish Evening: Live at the Grand Opera House which won a Grammy Award for Best Traditional Folk Album in 1993. With the Who, Daltrey received a Grammy Lifetime Achievement Award in 2001 for outstanding artistic significance in music.

In 1990 Daltrey was inducted into the Rock and Roll Hall of Fame in Cleveland, Ohio as a member of the Who. The Rock and Roll Hall of Fame also included three songs that Daltrey recorded with the Who on the list of 500 Songs that Shaped Rock and Roll, including: "My Generation", "Go to the Mirror!", and "Baba O'Riley". In 2005, Daltrey received a British Academy of Songwriters, Composers and Authors Gold Badge Award for special and lasting contributions to the British entertainment industry.

In 2003 Daltrey was honoured by Time magazine as a European Hero for his work with the Teenage Cancer Trust and other charities. In the New Year's Honours List published on 31 December 2004, he was appointed a Commander of the Order of the British Empire for services to Music, the Entertainment Industry and Charity.

As a member of the Who, Daltrey was inducted in 2005 into the UK Music Hall of Fame. In December 2008, he and Pete Townshend were honoured with America's most prestigious cultural awards as recipients of the 31st annual Kennedy Center Honors in Washington, D.C., by the then-president of the United States, George W. Bush. On 4 March 2009, three days after his 65th birthday, Daltrey accepted the James Joyce Award from the Literary and Historical Society of University College Dublin for outstanding success in the music field.

On 12 March 2011, he received the Steiger Award (Germany) for excellence in music. In November 2011, Daltrey and Pete Townshend received the Classic Album Award for Quadrophenia from the Classic Rock Roll of Honour Awards at the Roundhouse in Chalk Farm, London.

In July 2012 Daltrey received an honorary degree from Middlesex University in recognition of his contributions to music.

Daltrey has received numerous awards for his music, including Best Blues Album in the British Blues Awards 2015 alongside Wilko Johnson.

In 2019 Daltrey was the recipient of the Golden Plate Award of the American Academy of Achievement. He received his Golden Plate along with Pete Townshend and presented by Awards Council member Peter Gabriel of Genesis.

In June 2025 Daltrey was made a Knight Bachelor in the Birthday Honours for services to charity and music.

== Charities ==
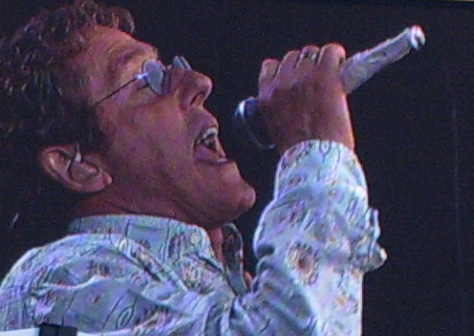
Daltrey at the Hyde Park Live 8 concert in 2005

All of the Who's Encore Series profits go to young people's charities. Daltrey was instrumental in starting the Teenage Cancer Trust concert series in 2000, with the Who playing in 2000, 2002, 2004, 2007 and 2010, and Daltrey playing solo in 2011 and in 2015 as the Who. The annual concerts have raised over £20 million. He has endorsed the Whodlums, a Who tribute band which raise money for the trust.

Daltrey performed at the first ChildLine Rocks concert at London's the O2 on 13 March 2008. In 2009, Daltrey was a judge for the 8th annual Independent Music Awards to support independent artists. In the same year, he appeared on stage with Michael J. Fox for the "A Funny Thing Happened on the Way to Cure Parkinson's" benefit. In April 2010, he headlined the Imagine A Cure II show honouring the legacy of the Beatles' John Lennon, which raised money for the Puget Sound Affiliate of Susan G. Komen for the Cure breast cancer charity. In 2011, Daltrey became a patron of the Children's Respite Trust for children with disabilities.

In 2011, Daltrey, Aerosmith's Steven Tyler, and Julie Andrews provided funding for Robert S. Langer's research at the Massachusetts Institute of Technology into vocal cord repair for victims of cancer and other disorders. On 4 November 2011, Daltrey and Pete Townshend launched the Daltrey/Townshend Teen and Young Adult Cancer Programme at the Ronald Reagan UCLA Medical Center in Los Angeles, to be funded by the Who's charity Teen Cancer America. The launch, followed on 5 November by a fund-raising event, was also attended by Robert Plant, and the Foo Fighters' Dave Grohl. Daltrey also announced that a portion of ticket sales from his solo tours would go to fund the teen cancer centres. In 2012, he offered his support to a project helping unemployed young people in Heathfield, East Sussex, run by Tomorrow's People Trust.

== Political views ==
In 1970, Daltrey publicly supported The National Campaign for Freedom of Information, saying: "I come from a working-class background and I am proud of it, and I intend to fight for the workers' right to know. We all need to know what goes on behind the scenes that is causing this country's economic mess. When we have a Freedom of Information Act in this country we shall have restored our Right to Know the Truth and that will bring sanity to our tax laws." A Freedom of Information Act became law in 2000.

Daltrey was previously a supporter of the British Labour Party, but he withdrew his endorsement, citing his opposition to the "mass immigration" policies put in place under the Blair government. In 2018, he criticised Labour leader Jeremy Corbyn, describing him as a "communist".

Daltrey supported Britain leaving the European Union (EU). He wrote in The Mirror: "Whatever happens, our country should never fear the consequences of leaving. We went into the Common Market in 1973. Do you know what was going on before we went in? It was the 1960s. The most exciting time ever – Britain was Swinging. Films, Theatre, Fashion, Art and Music.... Britain was the centre of the world. You got that because Britain was doing its own thing. It was independent. Not sure we'll ever get that again when we're ruled by bureaucrats in the European Union." He again criticised the EU in 2019, saying, "If you want to be signed up to be ruled by a fucking mafia, you do it. Like being governed by FIFA".

In 2017, Daltrey opined that a "dead dog" could have defeated Hillary Clinton in the 2016 United States presidential election. In 2018, he denounced the MeToo movement, saying: "I find this whole thing so obnoxious. It's always allegations and it's just salacious crap."

In 2021, Daltrey criticised "the woke generation" in an interview with Zane Lowe's Apple Music 1 podcast, arguing that younger generations are limiting themselves by stifling and undoing creative freedoms that had emerged through the artistic revolutions of the 1960s. He elaborated by saying "It's terrifying, the miserable world they're going to create for themselves. I mean, anyone who's lived a life and you see what they're doing, you just know that it's a route to nowhere."

== Personal life ==
Daltrey has been married twice. In 1964, he married Jacqueline "Jackie" Rickman. Later that year, their son, Simon, was born. They divorced in 1968. In 1967, Daltrey's son Mathias was born as a result of Daltrey's affair with Swedish model Elisabeth Aronsson. In 1968, Daltrey met Heather Taylor, a UK-born model living with her grandmother at the time, who supposedly was the subject of the 1967 Jimi Hendrix song "Foxy Lady". Daltrey and Taylor have been married since 1971. They have three children: Daughters Rosie Lea (born 1972) and Willow Amber (born 1975) and son Jamie (born 1981).

On 1 March 1994, his 50th birthday, Daltrey received a letter from a woman who stated that she was his daughter. Her birth resulted from a brief relationship that occurred during the interval between Daltrey's marriages. Daltrey later met two more daughters who were born during this period in the late 1960s. All three had been adopted, and had grown to adulthood before meeting their biological father. Daltrey stated that Heather had joined him in welcoming them to their extended family. In 2021, Daltrey said, "'When three daughters arrived on my doorstep [unexpectedly in the '90s, the products of relationships with women in the '60s], I accepted them and I love them very much'". As of 2018, Daltrey had eight children and fifteen grandchildren.

In 1971, Daltrey bought a farm at Holmshurst Manor, a Jacobean country house near Burwash in East Sussex. In 1981 he opened a trout farm, Lakedown Trout Fishery, designing its four spring-fed lakes himself. The business is now run by his son Jamie.

Daltrey announced onstage in 2018 that he had suffered hearing loss as a result of exposure to loud noise levels during performances and was now "very, very deaf". He urged audience members to use earplugs.

In 1978, during the recording of the Who's eighth studio album Who Are You, Daltrey had throat surgery to remove nodules. During a solo tour in 2009 he began finding it harder to reach the high notes. In December 2010 he was diagnosed with vocal cord dysplasia and consulted Steven M. Zeitels, director of the Massachusetts General Hospital Voice Center and professor at Harvard Medical School. Zeitels performed laser surgery to remove a possibly pre-cancerous growth. Both surgeries were considered successful, and Daltrey has regular checks to monitor his condition.

Daltrey has an allergy to cannabis that affects his singing voice. When second-hand marijuana smoke from an audience has affected his performance, he has occasionally interrupted the concert to request that people not smoke it. Daltrey has stated that he has never taken hard drugs.

Daltrey is a supporter of Arsenal F.C.

In a 2019 interview with The Times, bandmate Townshend said that Daltrey is an atheist, stating, "I believe in God, he doesn't."

== Discography ==
Solo

- Daltrey (1973)
- Ride a Rock Horse (1975)
- One of the Boys (1977)
- McVicar (1980)
- Parting Should Be Painless (1984)
- Under a Raging Moon (1985)
- Can't Wait to See the Movie (1987)
- Rocks in the Head (1992)
- As Long as I Have You (2018)

Collaborations with other artists

- An Irish Evening by the Chieftains (1992)
- Lys And Love by Laurent Voulzy (2011) – Vocals on Ma seule amour
- Going Back Home (2014) (with former Dr. Feelgood guitarist Wilko Johnson)

Other recordings

- Tommy (1972) (LSO version)
- Tommy (1975) (soundtrack)
- Lisztomania (1975) (soundtrack)
- The Iron Man: The Musical by Pete Townshend by Pete Townshend (1989)

The RD Crusaders

- At Ronnie Scott's On Sunday October 19, 2003 – DVD
- The Concert Monday 18th October 2004 – DVD
- Old Billingsgate 09.05.06
- Old Billingsgate 08.05.08

(Formed by Richard Desmond and Daltrey in 2003 to raise money for charitable causes. Featured performers were Gary Brooker, Gary Moore, Greg Lake, Lulu, Margo Buchanan, Robert Plant, Russ Ballard, Sam Brown, Simon Townshend, Steve Balsamo, Steve Smith, and Zoot Money)

== Filmography ==
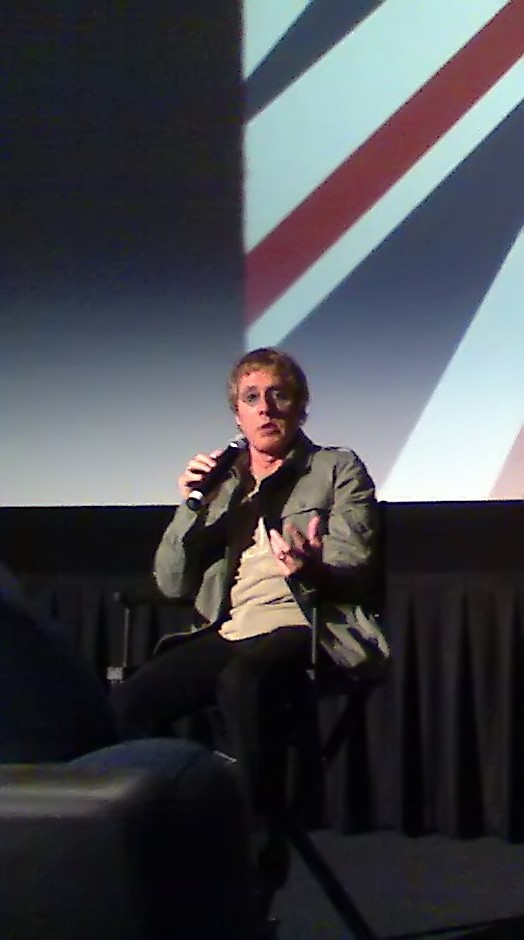
Daltrey prior to a screening of The Who at Kilburn: 1977 at the ArcLight Cinema in Sherman Oaks, Los Angeles, 2008

List of acting performances in film and television
Title	Year	Role	Notes
Tommy	1975	Tommy Walker	film
Lisztomania	1975	Franz Liszt	film
The Legacy	1978	Clive	film
McVicar	1980	John McVicar	also producer
The Beggar's Opera	1983	Captain Macheath	BBC musical production
BBC Television Shakespeare	1983	The Dromios	Episode: The Comedy of Errors
Bitter Cherry	1983		short
Murder: Ultimate Grounds for Divorce	1984	Roger Cunningham	film
Pop Pirates	1984	Producer	film
Buddy	1986	Terry Clark	TV mini-series
The Little Match Girl	1986	Jeb Macklin	musical film
The Hunting of the Snark	1987	The Barrister	concert appearance
Crossbow	1987	Francois Arconciel/François Arconciel	Episode: "Vogel"
Gentry	1987	Colin	TV film
How to Be Cool	1988	Himself	TV mini-series
Mack the Knife	1989	Street singer	musical film
Cold Justice	1989	Keith Gibson	film
Forgotten Prisoners: The Amnesty Files	1990	Howard	TV film
Buddy's Song	1991	Terry Clark	film, also music score composer, producer
Midnight Caller	1991	Danny Bingham	Episode: "Can't Say N-N-No"
If Looks Could Kill	1991	Blade	film
The Freddie Mercury Tribute Concert	1992	Himself	concert performance
The Real Story of Happy Birthday to You	1992	Barnaby (voice)	short
Tales from the Crypt	1993	Dalton Scott	Episode: "Forever Ambergris"
Highlander	1993–98	Hugh Fitzcairn	7 episodes
Lightning Jack	1994	John T. Coles	film
A Celebration: The Music of Pete Townshend and The Who	1994	Himself	concert performance
The Wizard of Oz in Concert: Dreams Come True	1995	Tin Man	concert performance
Bad English I: Tales of a Son of a Brit	1995		film
Vampirella	1996	Vlad	film
Lois & Clark: The New Adventures of Superman	1996	Tez	Episode: "Big Girls Don't Fly"
Sliders	1997	Col. Angus Rickman	Episode: "The Exodus"
Pirate Tales	1997	William Dampier	TV mini-series
Like It Is	1998	Kelvin	film
The Magical Legend of the Leprechauns	1999	King Boric	TV mini-series
The Bill	1999	Larry Moore	Episode: "Cracked Up"
Rude Awakening	1999–2000	Nobby Clegg	5 episodes
Dark Prince: The True Story of Dracula	2000	King Janos	TV film
Best	2000	Rodney Marsh	film
The Young Messiah – Messiah XXI	2000	Himself	concert performance
The Simpsons	2000	Himself, as part of the Who	Episode "A Tale of Two Springfields"
Strange Frequency 2	2001	Host/devil	TV series
Chasing Destiny	2001	Nehemiah Peoples	film
Witchblade	2001-2002	Father Del Toro/Madame Sesostris	2 episodes
.com for Murder	2002	Ben	film
That '70s Show	2002	Mr. Wilkinson	Episode: "That '70s Musical"
The Wheels on the Bus	2003	Argon the Dragon	children's DVD
Trafalgar Battle Surgeon	2005	Loblolly Boy	TV film
The Mighty Boosh	2005	Himself	Episode: "The Priest and the Beast"
Johnny Was	2006	Jimmy Nolan	film
CSI: Crime Scene Investigation	2006	Mickey Dunn	Episode: "Living Legend"
The Last Detective	2007	Mick Keating	Episode: "Once Upon a Time on the Westway"
Once Upon a Time	2012	Caterpillar	Episode: "Hat Trick"
Pawn Stars	2013	Himself	1 Episode
