= Velvet Goldmine =

1998 film by Todd Haynes

- Theatrical release poster
- Directed by: Todd Haynes
- Screenplay by: Todd Haynes
- Story by: James Lyons; Todd Haynes
- Produced by: Christine Vachon
- Starring: Ewan McGregor; Jonathan Rhys Meyers; Toni Collette; Christian Bale
- Cinematography: Maryse Alberti
- Edited by: James Lyons
- Music by: Carter Burwell
- Production companies: Zenith Productions; Killer Films; Newmarket Capital Group; Goldwyn Films; Film Four
- Distributed by: FilmFour Distribution (United Kingdom); Miramax Films (United States)
- Release dates: 22 May 1998 (Cannes); 23 October 1998 (United Kingdom); 6 November 1998 (United States)
- Running time: 123 minutes
- Countries: United Kingdom; United States
- Languages: English; French
- Budget: $9 million
- Box office: $4.3 million

Velvet Goldmine is a 1998 musical drama film written and directed by Todd Haynes from a story by Haynes and James Lyons. It is set in Britain during the glam rock days of the early 1970s, and tells the story of fictional bisexual pop star Brian Slade, who faked his own death. The film was nominated for the Palme d'Or at the 1998 Cannes Film Festival and won the award for the Best Artistic Contribution. Sandy Powell received a BAFTA Award for Best Costume Design and was nominated for an Academy Award for Best Costume Design. The film uses non-linear storytelling to achieve exposition while interweaving the vignettes of its various characters.

== Plot ==
In 1984, Arthur Stuart, a British journalist working for a New York City daily newspaper, is assigned to write an article about the disappearance of 1970s glam rock star Brian Slade, who faked his own murder as a publicity stunt during a concert at London's Lyceum Theatre ten years earlier. Slade's career ended following the critical and fan backlash over his publicity stunt, and he has since withdrawn from public life. Arthur reluctantly accepts the assignment.

As Arthur interviews people closely associated with Slade, the singer's life story is told though a series of flashbacks. Arthur's first interviewee is Slade's first manager, Cecil, who reveals that Slade's actual name was Thomas and that he grew up in suburban Birmingham. In the late 1960s, Slade was discovered by Cecil while performing at an underground club in London. Cecil immediately signed a contract with Slade, but after a series of unsuccessful gigs in his early career as a folk singer, Slade replaced Cecil with a new manager, Jerry Devine.

Arthur then interviews Slade's ex-wife Mandy. In the early 1970s, under Devine's management, Slade reinvented himself by adopting an androgynous space-alien alter ego, Maxwell Demon, and rose to stardom in Europe, while openly discussing his bisexuality in the press. During his first trip to the United States, Slade met American rock star Curt Wild; they soon started working on music together and also began an intense affair. However, as Wild became increasingly difficult to work with, he parted ways with Slade and moved to Berlin. Mandy eventually divorced Slade.

While investigating Slade's whereabouts, Arthur finds himself revisiting his own teenage years as a fan of Slade. After Arthur's parents caught him masturbating to a photo of Slade and Wild performing provocatively together on stage, he left his Manchester home and moved to London, where he immersed himself in the glam rock scene of the 1970s. It is revealed that Arthur was at the concert where Slade faked his death, and that after seeing Wild perform on another night, Arthur and Wild had a sexual encounter.

Arthur attempts to contact Wild but is rebuffed. As he gets closer to tracking down Slade, Arthur is told by his editor that the story is no longer of public interest and Arthur has been assigned to review the latest concert by conservative, Reagan-era pop star Tommy Stone. Arthur realises that, unknown to most, Tommy Stone is the new pseudonym and persona of Brian Slade. Eventually, Arthur confronts Tommy Stone and once again encounters Wild, who casually offers him a green brooch once owned by Oscar Wilde.

== Cast ==
- Ewan McGregor as Curt Wild
- Jonathan Rhys Meyers as Brian Slade
- Toni Collette as Mandy Slade
- Christian Bale as Arthur Stuart
- Eddie Izzard as Jerry Devine
- Emily Woof as Shannon
- Michael Feast as Cecil

== Production ==
The film centers on Brian Slade, a bisexual and androgynous glam rock icon who was patterned after David Bowie, Bryan Ferry, Jobriath and Marc Bolan. Director Todd Haynes requested access to Bowie's song catalogue along with a personal blessing to make the film, but Bowie refused, saying that he intended to make a similar film about the time. Ewan McGregor co-stars in the role of Curt Wild, a genre-defying performer who doesn't back down from sex, nudity or drugs on or off stage and whose biographical details are based on Iggy Pop (who grew up in a Michigan trailer park) and Lou Reed (whose parents sent him to electroshock therapy to 'cure' his homosexual feelings). Also featured are Christian Bale as the young glam rock fan and reporter Arthur Stuart and Toni Collette as Slade's wife, Mandy, who is based on Bowie's first wife, Angela. Eddie Izzard stars as Slade's manager, Jerry Devine.

The tale strongly parallels Bowie's relationships with Reed and Pop in the 1970s and 1980s. Brian Slade's gradually overwhelming stage persona of "Maxwell Demon" and his backing band, "Venus in Furs", resemble Bowie's Ziggy Stardust persona and backing band the Spiders from Mars. As with Slade and Wild, Bowie produced records for and with, Pop and Reed. The band name "Venus in Furs" is taken from a song by Lou Reed's early band, the Velvet Underground, which was taken from Leopold von Sacher-Masoch's eponymous novel, which appeared on their first album. Maxwell Demon was the name of an early band of Brian Eno, a long-time Bowie associate, whose music is heard at various points in the film.

Haynes has said that the story is also about the love affair between America and Britain, New York City and London, in the way each music scene feeds off and influences each other. Little Richard is shown as an early influence on Brian Slade. Little Richard inspired the Beatles and Bowie, who in turn inspired many other bands. Little Richard has also been cited by Haynes as the inspiration for Jack Fairy.

The film is strongly influenced by the ideas and life of Oscar Wilde (seen in the film as a progenitor of glam rock), and refers to events in his life and quotes his work on dozens of occasions. Jean Genet (the subject of Haynes' previous film, Poison, and the putative inspiration for the title of Bowie's song "The Jean Genie") is referred to in imagery and also quoted in dialogue.

The film's narrative structure is modelled on that of Orson Welles' Citizen Kane, in that the reporter Stuart tries to solve a mystery about Slade, travelling to interview Slade's lovers and colleagues, whose recollections are shown in 1950s, 1960s and 1970s flashbacks.

David Bowie was ambivalent about Velvet Goldmine upon release. According to Bowie, "When I saw the film I thought the best thing about it was the gay scenes. They were the only successful part of the film, frankly."

=== Music ===
Velvet Goldmine

Soundtrack album by various artists
- Released: 3 November 1998
- Genres: Glam rock, soundtrack
- Length: 1:12:09
- Label: Fontana Records London
- Producers: Randall Poster, Todd Haynes, Michael Stipe

Although the character of Brian Slade is based mainly on David Bowie, Bowie vetoed the proposal that his songs appear in the film. As producer of Lou Reed's 1972 Transformer album, his backing vocals (mainly consisting of "bum-bum-bum"s and "ooh-ooh"s) can be heard on "Satellite of Love". The finished soundtrack includes songs by glam rock and glam-influenced bands, past and present.

The English musicians who played under the name The Venus in Furs on the soundtrack were Radiohead's Thom Yorke and Jonny Greenwood, Craig "Clune" McClune of David Gray's band, Suede's Bernard Butler, and Roxy Music's Andy Mackay. The American musicians who played as Curt Wild's Wylde Ratttz on the soundtrack were The Stooges' Ron Asheton, Sonic Youth's Thurston Moore and Steve Shelley, Minutemen's Mike Watt, Gumball's Don Fleming, and Mark Arm of Mudhoney.

The soundtrack features new songs written for the film by Pulp, Shudder to Think and Grant Lee Buffalo, as well as many early glam rock compositions, covers and original versions. The Venus in Furs covers several Roxy Music songs with Thom Yorke channeling Bryan Ferry on vocals, Placebo covers T. Rex's "20th Century Boy," Wylde Ratttz and Ewan McGregor cover The Stooges' "T.V. Eye" and "Gimme Danger"; Teenage Fanclub and Donna Matthews cover the New York Dolls' "Personality Crisis". Lou Reed, Brian Eno, T. Rex, and Steve Harley songs from the period are also included. The album is rounded out by a piece of Carter Burwell's score.

All three members of the band Placebo appeared in the film, with Brian Molko and Steve Hewitt playing members of the Flaming Creatures (Malcolm and Billy respectively) and Stefan Olsdal playing Polly Small's bassist. Another member of the Flaming Creatures, Pearl, was played by Xavior (Paul Wilkinson), former lead singer of Romo band DexDexTer and later a keyboard player for Placebo and Rachel Stamp.

Track listing

1. Brian Eno: "Needle in the Camel's Eye" (Brian Eno, Phil Manzanera) – 3:09
2. Shudder to Think: "Hot One" (Nathan Larson, Shudder to Think) (Based on a lot of David Bowie's glam work, mostly "Time") – 3:04
3. Placebo: "20th Century Boy" (T. Rex cover) (Marc Bolan) – 3:42
4. The Venus in Furs (vocals by Thom Yorke): "2HB" (Roxy Music cover) (Bryan Ferry) – 5:39
5. Wylde Ratttz (vocals by Ewan McGregor): "T.V. Eye" (The Stooges cover) (Dave Alexander, Scott Asheton, Ron Asheton, James Osterberg Jr.) – 5:24
6. Shudder to Think: "Ballad of Maxwell Demon" (Based on David Bowie's "All the Young Dudes" and Brian Eno's band Maxwell Demon) (Craig Wedren, Shudder to Think) – 4:47
7. Grant Lee Buffalo: "The Whole Shebang" (Based on David Bowie's "Velvet Goldmine") (Grant-Lee Phillips) – 4:11
8. The Venus in Furs (vocals by Thom Yorke): "Ladytron" (Roxy Music cover) (Ferry) – 4:26
9. Pulp: "We Are the Boys" (Cocker, Banks, Doyle, Steve Mackey, Webber) – 3:13
10. Roxy Music: "Virginia Plain" (Ferry) – 3:00
11. Teenage Fanclub & Donna Matthews: "Personality Crisis" (New York Dolls cover) (David Johansen, Johnny Thunders) – 3:49
12. Lou Reed: "Satellite of Love" (Lou Reed) – 3:41
13. T. Rex: "Diamond Meadows" (Bolan) – 2:00
14. Paul Kimble & Andy Mackay: "Bitters End" (Ferry) – 2:13
15. The Venus in Furs (vocals by Jonathan Rhys Meyers): "Baby's on Fire" (Brian Eno cover) (Eno) – 3:19
16. The Venus in Furs (vocals by Thom Yorke): "Bitter-Sweet" (Roxy Music cover) (Andy Mackay, Ferry) – 4:55
17. Carter Burwell: "Velvet Spacetime" (Carter Burwell) – 4:10
18. The Venus in Furs (vocals by Jonathan Rhys Meyers): "Tumbling Down" (Cockney Rebel cover) (Steve Harley) – 3:28
19. Steve Harley & Cockney Rebel: "Make Me Smile (Come Up and See Me)" (Harley) – 3:59

A more extensive selection of music was used for the movie soundtrack.

Film soundtrack listing

1. "Needle in the Camel's Eye" (Eno, Manzanera) – performed by Brian Eno
2. "Hot One" (Larson, Shudder to Think) – performed by Shudder to Think
3. "People Rockin' People" (Larson) – performed by Nathan Larson
4. "Avenging Annie" (Andy Pratt) – performed by Andy Pratt
5. "Coz I Love You" (Noddy Holder, Jim Lea) – performed by Slade
6. "The Fat Lady of Limbourg" (Eno) – performed by Brian Eno
7. "A Little of What You Fancy Does You Good" (Fred W. Leigh, George Arthurs) – performed by Lindsay Kemp
8. "Tutti Frutti" (Richard Penniman, Dorothy LaBostrie) – performed by the Venus in Furs, vocals by Callum Hamilton
9. "Do You Wanna Touch Me? (Oh Yeah!)" (Gary Glitter, Mike Leander) – performed by Gary Glitter
10. "Band of Gold" (Ronald Dunbar, Edythe Wayne) – performed by Freda Payne
11. "2HB" (Ferry) – performed by the Venus in Furs, vocals by Thom Yorke
12. "Sebastian" (Harley) – performed by the Venus in Furs, vocals by Jonathan Rhys Meyers
13. "T.V. Eye" (Alexander, S. Asheton, R. Asheton, Osterberg Jr.) – performed by Wylde Ratttz, vocals by Ewan McGregor
14. "Ballad of Maxwell Demon" (Wedren, Shudder to Think) – performed by Shudder to Think
15. "The Whole Shebang" (Phillips) – performed by Grant Lee Buffalo
16. "Symphony No. 6 in A Minor" (Gustav Mahler) – performed by Czech Philharmonic Orchestra
17. "Get in the Groove" (James Timothy Shaw) – performed by The Mighty Hannibal
18. "Ladytron" (Ferry) – performed by the Venus in Furs, vocals by Thom Yorke
19. "We Are the Boys" (Cocker, Banks, Doyle, Mackey, Webber) – performed by Pulp
20. "Cosmic Dancer" (Bolan) – performed by T. Rex
21. "Virginia Plain" (Ferry) – performed by Roxy Music
22. "Personality Crisis" (Johansen, Thunders) – performed by Teenage Fanclub & Donna Matthews
23. "Satellite of Love" (Reed) – performed by Lou Reed
24. "Diamond Meadows" (Bolan) – performed by T. Rex
25. "Bitters End" (Ferry) – performed by Paul Kimble
26. "Baby's on Fire" (Eno) – performed by the Venus in Furs, vocals by Jonathan Rhys Meyers
27. "My Unclean" (R. Asheton, Mark Arm) – performed by Wylde Ratz, vocals by Ewan McGregor
28. "Bitter-Sweet" (Mackay, Ferry) – performed by the Venus in Furs, vocals by Thom Yorke
29. "20th Century Boy" (Bolan) – performed by Placebo
30. "Dead Finks Don't Talk" (Eno) -performed by Brian Eno
31. "Gimme Danger" (Iggy Pop, James Williamson) – performed by the Venus in Furs, vocals by Ewan McGregor
32. "Tumbling Down" (Harley) – performed by the Venus in Furs, vocals by Jonathan Rhys Meyers
33. "2HB" (Ferry) – performed by the Venus in Furs, vocals by Paul Kimble
34. "Make Me Smile (Come Up and See Me)" (Harley) – performed by Steve Harley & Cockney Rebel

== Alternate versions ==
The international cut of the film which premiered at Cannes runs 123 minutes, while the US cut released theatrically later that year by Miramax was re-edited and runs 118 minutes.

== Home media ==
Since its 1999 DVD release, the film has become a cult classic and has been described as having "an obsessive following among younger audiences." Haynes said in a 2007 interview, "A film that had the hardest time, at least initially, was Velvet Goldmine, and it's the film that seems to mean the most to a lot of teenagers and young people, who are just obsessed with that movie. They're exactly who I was thinking about when I made Velvet Goldmine, but it just didn't get to them the first time around."

A Blu-ray was released in Region A on 13 December 2011, and includes a newly recorded commentary track by Haynes and Vachon. In it, Haynes thanks the fansites for helping him compile the notes for the commentary.

The soundtrack to Velvet Goldmine was released on vinyl in 2019.

== Reception ==
=== Box office ===
The film opened in the United Kingdom on 23 October 1998 and grossed over $700,000. It was released in the United States on 6 November 1998 in 85 venues, grossing $301,787 in its opening weekend and ranking sixteenth at the box office, and fifth among the week's new releases. It would ultimately gross $1,053,788 in the United States and Canada and $4,313,644 worldwide.

=== Critical response ===
Velvet Goldmine received generally positive reviews from critics. On review aggregator website Rotten Tomatoes, the film has a 64% rating based on 50 reviews, with an average of 6.6/10. The critical consensus reads: "Velvet Goldmine takes a visual and narrative approach befitting its larger-than-life subject, although it's still disappointingly less than the sum of its parts". Metacritic reports a 65 out of 100 score based on 25 critics, indicating "generally favorable reviews".

Janet Maslin, having seen the film at the New York Film Festival, made it a "NYT Critics' Pick," calling it a "dazzlingly surreal" rock version of "Citizen Kane with an extraterrestrial Rosebud" and saying it "brilliantly reimagines the glam rock ‘70s as a brave new world of electrifying theatricality and sexual possibility, to the point where identifying precise figures in this neo-psychedelic landscape is almost beside the point. Velvet Goldmine tells a story the way operas do: blazing with exquisite yet abstract passions, and with quite a lot to look at on the side." According to Peter Travers, "Haynes creates Velvet Goldmine...with a masturbatory fervor that demands dead-on details" and "fashions a structure out of Citizen Kane"; it's a film that "works best as a feast of sight and sound,...re-creating an era as a gorgeous carnal dream,...celebrat[ing] the art of the possible." In a less enthusiastic review, Roger Ebert of the Chicago Sun-Times gave the film two out of four stars and found its plot too discursive and confusingly assorted because of how it "bogs down in the apparatus of the search for Slade" by clumsily using scenes from Citizen Kane. David Sterritt from The Christian Science Monitor wrote "The music and camera work are dazzling, and the story has solid sociological insights into a fascinating pop-culture period."

In a retrospective review, Slant Magazine's Jeremiah Kipp gave Velvet Goldmine four out of four stars and said that, although unsupportive critics may be "terrified of a movie with so many ideas", the film successfully shows a "melancholic ode to freedom, and those who fight for it through art", because of Haynes' detailed imagery and the cast's "expressive, soulful performances". Scott Tobias of The A.V. Club felt that Haynes' appropriation of structural elements from Citizen Kane is the film's "masterstroke", as it helps "evoke the glam rock movement without destroying the all-important mystique that sustains it." Tobias argued that, like Haynes' Bob Dylan-inspired 2007 film I'm Not There, Velvet Goldmine deals with a famously enigmatic figure indirectly through allusion and imagery, and consequently succeeds more than a simpler biopic could.

In an interview with GQ, Jonathan Rhys Meyers criticized the decision to use a different actor to play Tommy Stone at the end of the film: "... it's very hard for the audience to get that, which I think, I'm not quite sure did we make the right move there. Because I would have preferred to play Tommy Stone myself. You would have got more of the connection."

=== Accolades ===
Award	Date of ceremony	Category	Recipient(s)	Result	Ref.
Academy Awards	March 21, 1999	Best Costume Design	Sandy Powell	Nominated	
British Academy Film Awards	11 April 1999	Best Costume Design	Sandy Powell	Won	
British Academy Film Awards	11 April 1999	Best Makeup and Hair	Peter King	Nominated	
Cannes Film Festival	24 May 1998	Palme d'Or	Todd Haynes	Nominated	
Cannes Film Festival	24 May 1998	Best Artistic Contribution	Todd Haynes	Won	
Edinburgh International Film Festival	30 August 1998	Channel 4 Director's Award	Todd Haynes	Won	
GLAAD Media Awards	March 28, 1999	Outstanding Film – Limited Theatrical Release	Velvet Goldmine	Nominated	
Golden Reel Awards	March 20, 1999	Best Sound Editing – Music – Musical Feature (Foreign & Domestic)	Annette Kudrak (music editor), Todd Kasow (scoring editor)	Nominated	
Independent Spirit Awards	March 20, 1999	Best Feature	Christine Vachon	Nominated	
Independent Spirit Awards	March 20, 1999	Best Director	Todd Haynes	Nominated	
Independent Spirit Awards	March 20, 1999	Best Cinematography	Maryse Alberti	Won	
London Film Critics Circle Awards	4 March 1999	British Newcomer of the Year	Jonathan Rhys Meyers	Nominated	

== See also ==
- Hedwig and the Angry Inch (2001)
