= Seven Ages of Rock =

British television series

Seven Ages of Rock (also known as 7 Ages of Rock) is a BBC Two series, co-produced by BBC Worldwide and VH1 Classic in 2007 about the history of rock music.

Seven Ages of Rock's intertitle

It comprised six 60-minute episodes (reduced to 48 minutes for VH1 Classic), with a final episode of 90 minutes, and was broadcast on Saturdays at 21:00 (repeated on BBC One on Sundays). Each episode focused on one type of rock music, each typified by one or two artists or bands. The series producer was William Naylor, and the executive producer for the BBC was Michael Poole, a former editor of the 1990s BBC music, arts and culture programme The Late Show. The production was based at BBC Bristol and each programme was narrated by Julian Rhind-Tutt on the BBC and Dennis Hopper on VH1 classic.

The series also included additional material broadcast on BBC radio and available on the BBC website.

== Series structure ==
The series makes heavy use of archive material. These early performances of musicians are interspersed with interviews with various other musicians. Naylor could use interviews from various other music series he had made for the BBC, such as with David Bowie, who was not available for an interview this time.

In an interview about the series, Naylor says that he has noticed the time is ripe for a revival of rock because he sees a growing popularity of slightly uncomfortable music and a somewhat arrogant attitude, precisely what rock needs. He also claims the series finally says what needed to be said, that England made Jimi Hendrix. He even states that rock music started on 24 September 1966 in London, when Jimi Hendrix went there.

== Episodes ==
	Title	Genre	Main artist(s)	Original BBC air date	Origin of Title
1	The Birth of Rock	Blues rock	Jimi Hendrix	19 May 2007	The first episode in the series
–	My Generation	The Birth of Rock	The Rolling Stones; The Who; Cream	17 December 2007 (no BBC broadcast, on VH1 Classic only)	Song by The Who, from their first album (1965)
2	White Light, White Heat	Art rock	Pink Floyd; Roxy Music; The Velvet Underground; David Bowie	26 May 2007	Song by The Velvet Underground, from their second album (1968)
3	Blank Generation	Punk rock	Ramones; Sex Pistols; The Clash; Patti Smith	2 June 2007	Song by The Voidoids, from their first album (1976)
4	Never Say Die	Heavy metal	Black Sabbath; Ozzy Osbourne; Deep Purple; Iron Maiden; Judas Priest; Metallica	9 June 2007	Song by Black Sabbath, from their eighth album (1978)
5	We Are the Champions	Stadium rock	Led Zeppelin; Queen; Kiss; Bruce Springsteen; The Police; Dire Straits; U2	16 June 2007	Song by Queen, from News of the World (1977)
6	Left of the Dial	US Alternative rock	Nirvana; R.E.M.	23 June 2007	Song by the Replacements, from Tim (1985)
7	What the World Is Waiting For	British Indie rock	The Smiths; The Stone Roses; Oasis; Blur	30 June 2007	Song by the Stone Roses, released as a double A-side with Fools Gold.

=== Programme 1: The Birth of Rock ===
Performing bands,
in order of appearance
Jimi Hendrix
Howlin' Wolf
The Rolling Stones
The Yardbirds
Bob Dylan
The Who
Tim Rose
Cream
The Beatles

Jimi Hendrix grew up in Seattle in the 1950s, learning the Twelve-bar blues as a teenager. Whilst in the Army, he came under the influence of the electric blues of artists such as Howlin' Wolf, B.B. King and Muddy Waters. After he was discharged in 1962, he became involved in the Chitlin' Circuit, playing with figures such as Little Richard.

Former Animals member, Eric Burdon, says Hendrix could not get off the ground in the United States because black blues was not popular there. Meanwhile, the English music scene was learning to play the blues from the US records they bought, with bands forming like The Rolling Stones, who began by copying American blues numbers. When they started to write their own songs they gave them a sexual swagger and a new direction. Whites playing the blues made it more acceptable to the white US audience reintroducing the style to America. When Hendrix moved to New York City he came under the influence of British blues music, especially that of Jeff Beck of The Yardbirds and Eric Clapton, who had become famous with John Mayall & the Bluesbreakers. While living in Harlem, he also came under the influence of Bob Dylan, whose "Like a Rolling Stone" revolutionised rock. For Hendrix, this inspired him to begin singing, having previously been self-conscious about his voice. Another English band, The Who, inspired him most. With a roughness and a high octane sound, they created the modern stage presence with the theatrics of destroying their equipment, such as playing the guitar by ramming it against the floor and speakers.

Jimi Hendrix came to London in late 1966 after having been discovered and invited by his future manager Chas Chandler of The Animals, on the sole condition that he would be introduced to his guitar heroes. He arrived at the height of swinging London with Cream being the most important band around. At one of their concerts, Hendrix asked if he could join in a jam. That was already audacious, playing with 'God', but then he blew Clapton away, who went back stage and had a hard time lighting a cigarette because his hands were shaking too much. Stealing Cream's thunder, Chandler put together The Jimi Hendrix Experience, who became famous faster than almost any other rock band.

However, despite his UK success, Hendrix was still largely ignored in his home country. This was to change when he played the Monterey International Pop Festival at the height of the Summer of Love. The Who played first, with an aggression never before seen in the United States, Hendrix stunned the crowds further with his explosive sound and showmanship culminating in setting fire to his guitar.

In 1966, The Beatles had taken refuge in the studio, transforming themselves from a pop band to psychedelic pioneers. When Sgt. Pepper's Lonely Hearts Club Band was released in 1967, Hendrix covered it on one of the experience's next shows. Having seen the power of the studio album he went on to create Electric Ladyland. However, it led to Hendrix becoming more deeply involved in drugs and Chas Chandler leaving as manager.

By 1968, America and Europe were being torn apart by conflict at home and abroad. The Rolling Stones tapped into these feelings with a new creative zeal. However, their performance at Altamont became one of the most violent days in rock history, after a member of Hells Angels killed Meredith Hunter, a drugged member of the audience, who drew a revolver from his jacket during the Stones' set. The Altamont festival was meant to mirror the Woodstock Festival, where Hendrix delivered a searing version of the Star-Spangled Banner, which some saw as a political statement against the Vietnam War. However, Hendrix began to tire of stage performance and at the Isle of Wight Festival in 1970, he gave a lacklustre performance. In September, he died of an accidental overdose. Along with the deaths of Jim Morrison and Janis Joplin and the breaking up of The Beatles, this brought this age of rock to a close.

==== Alternative Programme 1: My Generation ====
The broadcast of the VH1 episode is very differently structured and features several different songs, interviews, and artists, as well as the main focus, Jimi Hendrix, being completely removed and the new focus being the Rolling Stones. This is not an issue with other episodes which are only mildly different.

Performing bands,
in order of appearance
John Lee Hooker
Howlin' Wolf
The Rolling Stones
The Yardbirds
The Kinks
The Who
The Animals
Bob Dylan
Cream

In the early 1960s, the music for teenagers was sweet and soulless, manufactured pop with a beat for crooners such as Bobby Vinton and Bobby Vee. The music of blues singers such as John Lee Hooker, Muddy Waters and Howlin' Wolf was powerful and rebellious and had come out of struggle in a way that spoke to the British Working Class, who were not politically constrained as they were in white America.

In 1962, The Rolling Stones formed and started playing in the Crawdaddy Club in Richmond. Their Blues with a British twist proved a hit with teenage audiences. The Rolling Stones began creating their own songs with lyrics loaded with arrogance and sex. Their space at the Crawdaddy Club was taken by The Yardbirds, who attempted to produce their own twist on the blues, helped by their guitarist Eric Clapton, who was considered by some to be so proficient with the guitar that he garnered the popular nickname "God". However, he split from the Yardbirds after their commercial success to become a serious blues musician.

A new wave of British bands were now emerging. The Kinks produced an electrified gritty sound expanding musical possibilities. Inspired by them, The Who combined a macho image, pop art and fast driven rock. In 1965, year zero of rock, the Who released a song that the program postulates defined the era, "My Generation", and was incredibly innovative in both its sound and rebellious message.

The Animals had first opened the path for these bands with the reimagining of "The House of the Rising Sun", which they came across when it was covered by Bob Dylan from the New York City folk scene. He now took inspiration from these new British bands by going electric to produce "the Wild Thin Mercury sound of Rock Music", which added sophisticated lyrics to rock.

Back in Britain, Eric Clapton had found creative freedom in his own band Cream, which were much more musically skilled than most other groups at the time. They took the language and feel of the blues producing the 'endless-solo'. Disraeli Gears took the blues and combined it with the drug-filled psychedelia, showing the artistic potential of rock.

When The Who went to the Monterey International Pop Festival, they innovated the live performance by channelling aggression, playing at high volume and destroying their instruments. This established the festival as the centre of the rock performance but also signalled the end of the innocent optimism of the summer of love. Anxieties over the Vietnam war and social unrest rising and, after the Woodstock Festival, business started to take over what artists were doing. This new mood was channelled by the Rolling Stones using darkness as a new creative zeal. However, they were plunged into their own darkness with the death of Brian Jones and the chaos of Altamont, where, according to Al Kooper, the innocence of the Sixties finally died.

The Beatles are not mentioned throughout the episode.

Many of this episode's featured songs are completely different, and so they are listed separately here:

Artist	Song	Year	UK Chart	US Chart
John Lee Hooker	"Boom Boom"	1962	–	–
Howlin' Wolf	"Spoonful"	1960	–	–
The Rolling Stones	"Not Fade Away"	1964	3	48
The Rolling Stones	"Around and Around"	1964 (Five by Five EP)	1 (EP chart)	–
Howlin' Wolf	"How Many More Years"	1951	–	–
The Rolling Stones	"Little Red Rooster"	1964	1	–
The Yardbirds	"For Your Love"	1965	3	6
The Rolling Stones	"The Last Time"	1965	1	9
The Rolling Stones	"(I Can't Get No) Satisfaction"	1965	1	1
The Kinks	"You Really Got Me"	1964	1	7
The Who	"I Can't Explain"	1965	8	97
The Who	"My Generation"	1965	2	74
The Animals	"The House of the Rising Sun"	1964	1	1
Bob Dylan	"Like a Rolling Stone"	1965	2	4
Cream	"I Feel Free"	1966	11	116
Cream	"Crossroads"	1968 (Wheels of Fire Album)	3	1
Cream	"Sunshine of Your Love"	1967 (Disraeli Gears Album)	5	4
The Rolling Stones	"Gimme Shelter"	1969 (Let It Bleed Album)	1	3
The Rolling Stones	"Sympathy for the Devil"	1968 (Beggars Banquet Album)	3	5

=== Programme 2: "White Light, White Heat" ===
Performing bands,
in order of appearance
Pink Floyd
The Velvet Underground
David Bowie
The Hype (David Bowie and Mick Ronson)
Roxy Music
Genesis

In 1967, Pink Floyd published "Arnold Layne", a song about a clothes-stealing transvestite, introducing a new concept in pop music, psychedelia. Like Andy Warhol did with The Velvet Underground in the United States, they turned their shows into multimedia spectacles. Warhol came up with the idea of projecting films on the background of the stage. With Peter Jenner seeing Pink Floyd as the English version of the Velvet Underground, they decided to use this medium to illustrate the songs they were singing, projecting what effectively were the first music clips on a large screen behind the band. The shows grew ever more weird, and others followed. David Bowie was inspired by the weirdness of Velvet Underground and the madness of Pink Floyd's Syd Barrett (as exemplified by his Jugband Blues). Bowie created an alter-ego named Ziggy Stardust, which gave him an excuse to dress up on stage. Genesis' Peter Gabriel took Bowie's stage act even further dressing in even more elaborate and bizarre costumes; "Compared to what Gabriel wore on stage, Bowie was dressed for a night at the pub."

Another new thing in rock music was experimenting with sounds. Roxy Music introduced an oboe to rock. And when Pink Floyd wondered what a piano would sound like through a Leslie speaker, they came up with the intro to "Echoes", a piece that lasted the entire second side of the album Meddle. The stage performances of songs could also last much longer than the album versions. The performances grew so large that Pink Floyd felt ever more alienated from the audience and decided to 'protest' against that by putting up such a large performance with huge puppets for the stage show of The Wall that the band became almost invisible. During the show, they built up a wall on stage between themselves and the audience making them literally invisible. This performance lasted only four shows and marked the end of this age of rock.

In the VH1 version of this episode, David Bowie's early influences are discussed in less detail, there is no discussion of Bowie and Roxy Music playing the Rainbow theatre and Hang On to Yourself – David Bowie, Ladytron and Re-make Remodel are not featured with the section on Roxy Music being much smaller and Supper's Ready – Genesis is played but not discussed except in relation to costumes.

In this episode, some of the featured songs on the BBC website were not the same as featured in the episode as The Velvet Underground – Venus In Furs is replaced by The Velvet Underground – All Tomorrow's Parties.

=== Programme 3: Blank Generation ===
Performing bands,
in order of appearance
Ramones
Sex Pistols
Television
Richard Hell and the Voidoids
Patti Smith
The Damned
The Buzzcocks
The Clash
The Slits
Public Image Ltd

"In 1975, New York City was near bankruptcy and no fun at all. London was not much better. In this tale of two cities, from the worst of times came the best of times: punk rock." Punk went back to the roots. If people saw a show they should get the feeling that they could do that themselves; that is what rock and roll is all about. Punk was DIY; the bands invented themselves, and the punkers made their own clothes.

The Ramones sang about the street life experiences of kids in Queens. The Sex Pistols started with covers of mod classics by The Who, but of course, they soon also went DIY in that respect, although that did not prevent Glen Matlock from letting ABBA's "SOS" inspire him for the guitar riff in "Pretty Vacant".

Punk was class rage. According to Charles Shaar Murray, "The New York punks were bohemians or aspired to be, and the London punks were yobs or aspired to be." According to Sex Pistol John Lydon, the indignation was not put on; "We suffer, and you can fuck off for it!"

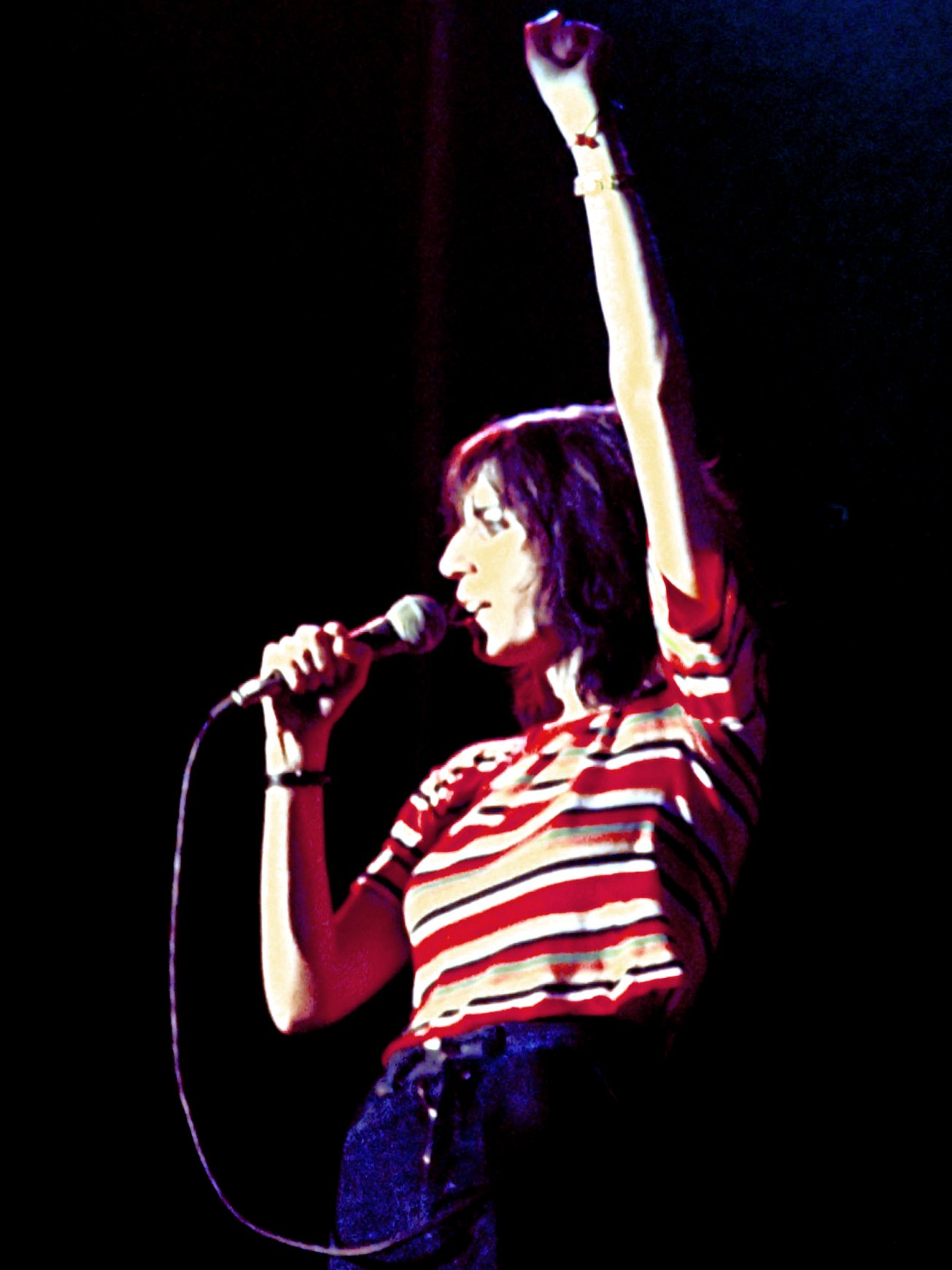
Patti Smith performing in 1976

Punk was about doing new things, and punk girl bands like Siouxsie and the Banshees and The Slits were new in a new way; Viv Albertine said "We wanted to do our own girlie whalloping thing, and punk was open enough for us to do that." And Patti Smith was not only about music, but about language too, almost like a freestyle rapper; "Spitting out something that goes right into your head."

When the Sex Pistols went to the United States, they wanted to show them what punk was really about, but instead it destroyed them. They had no fun, so they decided to take that to the extreme in their last show in San Francisco in 1978, playing a typically raucous show, and ending (as an Encore) with a cover of The Stooges song "No Fun". Before going off stage, John Lydon remarked "Ever get the feeling you've been cheated?" Lydon later commented: "That was directed to the whole world, including us." After leaving, Lydon started Public Image Ltd, and ushered in the post-punk era.

In this episode, some of the featured songs on the BBC website were not the same as featured in the episode. These include the episode not opening with Iggy and the Stooges' "No Fun" but the Sex Pistols' version (although is not named until the end of the episode), the Buzzcocks also played "Boredom" and "Ever Fallen in Love"; The Slits only featuring one song, "Typical Girls", rather than the three featured on the website; and Public Image's "Poptones" appearing in the episode.

The VH1 broadcast was substantially different from the BBC. No discussion was made of the Sex Pistols' interview with Bill Grundy and the press coverage. Also there was no mention of The Buzzcocks, Tommy James talking about "New Rose", the Punk girl bands or Public Image Limited, instead the episode playing out to "London Calling" by the Clash.

=== Programme 4: Never Say Die ===
Performing bands,
in order of appearance
Black Sabbath
Deep Purple
Judas Priest
Iron Maiden
Mötley Crüe
Ozzy Osbourne
Metallica

Heavy metal is the music critics love to hate, but also the longest lasting mainstay of rock music. More than any other band at the time, Black Sabbath were influenced by their surroundings, heavily industrialised Birmingham. This was even more true for guitarist Tony Iommi, who cut off the tips of two fingers in a steel factory. When he tried to solve this problem by melting a washing up liquid bottle, and forming two 'thimbles' for his fingers, he found that by tuning his guitar down three semitones (to C#), he could play just as easily, and also get a very different, altogether much darker sound (although this was not used until their third album). Another inspiration for the band came from the movie theatre across the street. Sabbath decided that if people were eager to pay money to be scared, then maybe they should play scary music.

In 1971, when Deep Purple were in Montreux to record the album Machine Head, they were themselves scared by a fire in the casino when "some stupid with a flare gun burned the place to the ground" during a concert by The Mothers of Invention. Since their recording studio was also in the casino, they decided to make the album in their hotel. On the last day they needed to record one more song and decided to simply tell the story of their recording session, which became the lyrics to "Smoke on the Water".

By the end of the 1980s, Metal had become too commercial for some fans, with groups like the W.A.S.P., Hanoi Rocks and Poison having huge success. Influenced by the New Wave of British Heavy Metal, another new sound had risen to prominence in the United States, where metal had a huge following: thrash metal, a style that went beyond in multiple respects, being faster and heavier than anything that had come before. But playing the guitar ever faster had reached a ceiling and at the turn of the decade, Metallica, one of the inventors of thrash, decided to turn that around and adopt a very slow, heavy, sound. The result was The Black Album which went on to sell over 15 million copies and "proved that metal, never in fashion, but never out of fashion, will always just keep on going".

The VH1 broadcast was different from the BBC. No discussion was made of Sabbath Bloody Sabbath being recorded or played. Breaking the Law did not feature and nothing was discussed about punk. After the death of Randy Rhoads, instead of playing I Don't Know from Live in Salt Lake City, it features Shot in the Dark, there is also no mention Ozzy Osbourne's off stage antics such as decapitating birds and bats or urinating on the Alamo.

=== Programme 5: We Are the Champions ===
Performing bands,
in order of appearance
Led Zeppelin
Queen
Kiss
Bruce Springsteen
The Police
Dire Straits
U2

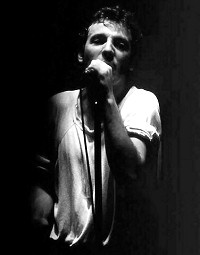
Bruce Springsteen in Norway 1981

One of the first big bands of stadium rock was Led Zeppelin, who played to audiences of 50,000. They were so successful that they could take 90% of the revenue, leaving only 10% for the promoters, who were used to taking the largest slice of the pie. But in the case of Led Zeppelin even 10% was worth their while. Queen took this even further and played for audiences of 130.000, filling big stadiums. This was in part due to the act they put on. In the United States, Kiss took that even further, ignoring the music and focusing purely on the act. They made their money largely from merchandise, which was bought by children who knew nothing of Rock and Roll and the merchandise alone gave them a revenue of 50 million dollars per year. In the United States, Bruce Springsteen also became one of the icons of stadium rock, almost against his own will. He kept playing clubs when he could have been playing theatres and he kept playing theatres when he could have been playing stadiums. But ironically, it was exactly this 'regular guy' attitude that made him popular.

When The Police had made it in England, they first financed their own tour of the United States (where for a while they became the biggest band) and then started going to countries where few other western bands had gone before. Queen did something similar by touring South America and filling huge football stadiums. In Japan, they were received as warmly as The Beatles. This was all topped by Live Aid, which was heard by a third of the world population. Bob Geldof: "It turned out the lingua franca of the world was not English, but Rock and Roll."

U2 was the last great band to emerge from stadium rock. Zoo TV Tour brought the television on stage. And they introduced another new phenomenon, the B-stage, in the middle of the audience, where they were totally surrounded by them, thus reversing the ongoing development of the bands getting ever further separated from their audiences.

The VH1 version of this episode did not mention Peter Grant or 90/10 deal with concert promoters, the "designer bands" of Aerosmith, Guns N' Roses, and Bon Jovi, nor having any of them playing. It did not show Queen playing Hyde Park and did not have them playing Another One Bites the Dust or I Want to Break Free, with no discussion on the politics of playing in South America. The discussion of the Police is reduced and Walking on the Moon is not played. The Angel of Harlem is also not featured.

=== Programme 6: Left of the Dial ===
Performing bands,
in order of appearance
R.E.M.
Black Flag
The Replacements
Hüsker Dü
Mudhoney
Nirvana
Pearl Jam
Pixies

"Seattle, Washington, USA. In the early 1990s, the music capital of the world. Home to grunge, teen spirit and the kings of alternative rock, Nirvana, the band that brought the sound of the American underground to a mass audience." Alternative rock was a reaction to the shock treatment of Reaganomics, leading to Generation X, that couldn't identify with the studio-polished rock that filled mainstream radio and MTV. Nirvana's Kurt Cobain and Krist Novoselic were part of this generation and inspired by groups such as Black Flag, who played a more fitting musical style, hardcore punk. Alternative rock was in the early 1980s called college rock because it was mostly played by campus radio stations, which broadcast in the lower bandwidths of the FM band of the radio spectrum in the United States, so listeners had to turn the knob to "left of the dial". These were also forced to tour constantly and play in small venues with groups such as The Replacements and Sonic Youth.

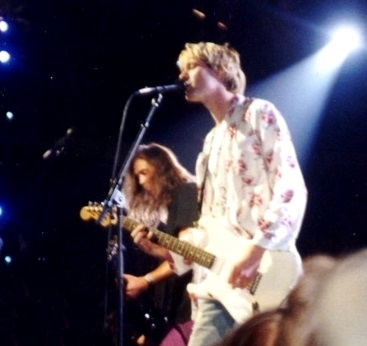
Nirvana c. 1992

The founding band of alternative rock, R.E.M., toured non-stop from 5 April 1980 to the end of 1989, so they laid down their guitars and Peter Buck picked up a mandolin, resulting in the song "Losing My Religion", that would be the start of the sound that gave them worldwide fame. Nirvana experienced a similar change, starting with Cobain's song "About a Girl", which he was unsure about because it was so 'poppy'. Another inspiration for their new sound was the way they started every recording session, taking half an hour for a free-style jam, in which they experimented with how soft or how loud they could play. Cobain liked the contrast and had always wondered what it would sound like if one mixed Black Sabbath with The Beatles. He dreamed of noise and melody, hard guitars and harmonies. Nirvana created a sound that blended the fury of grunge with a new feel for melody and the mass commercial appeal of R.E.M., leading to what would become alternative rock's anthem, "Smells Like Teen Spirit". There were some reservations about the song because it sounded like a Pixies rip-off, a band that had been playing exactly that dynamic mix of soft and loud music. Because of the success of Nirvana, R.E.M. and Mudhoney, Alternative Rock and Grunge went mainstream and record companies bought up as many of these small bands as possible, leading to the commercial success of groups such as Soundgarden, Alice in Chains, The Smashing Pumpkins and Pearl Jam.

Nirvana put Seattle on the map, so REM went there too. There was even talk of the two bands performing together; however, Kurt Cobain's untimely death prevented this collaboration from happening. Cobain admired R.E.M., as they had achieved everything without compromise, while he had become part of the machine he despised. After he had already become rich, he still bought clothes in Salvation Army stores. Fans knew this, so there would be some 80 of them waiting at the store, just to watch what clothes he would buy, even cracking the window as they peeked in. Some can handle that sort of attention, some can't. Kurt couldn't. He joked about naming their new album I Hate Myself and I Want to Die (instead it would be called In Utero). Five months after Nirvana's famous unplugged session, in April 1994, he killed himself, despite efforts by R.E.M.'s Michael Stipe to get him back on his feet again. Cobain's suicide note read the words of Neil Young "It's better to burn out than to fade away".

In the VH1 version of this episode, It's the End of the World as We Know It (And I Feel Fine) – R.E.M. does not feature and instead opens to Here Comes a Regular – The Replacements (although unnamed), Hüsker Dü do not feature and are not mentioned, instead Sonic Youth's Goo album is mentioned and shown in relation to their signing to a mainstream label. Pearl Jam are discussed in slightly more detail, Something In The Way and Come As You Are by Nirvana are not featured and the discussion of Unplugged is reduced, only being featured in relation to Cobain's suicide.

=== Programme 7: What the World Is Waiting For ===
Performing bands,
in order of appearance
The Smiths
The Jesus and Mary Chain
The Stone Roses
Happy Mondays
Inspiral Carpets
Blur
Oasis
Suede
Coldplay
Stereophonics
Travis
The Verve
The Libertines
Arctic Monkeys
Franz Ferdinand
Kaiser Chiefs

The British Indie scene flourished in Manchester in the early 1980s. Manchester was transformed by The Smiths, through Morrissey's lyrics into a place of epic romance as part of a critique of the hard northern working class life under Margaret Thatcher. The Indie scene was diverse and contained bands such as Cocteau Twins, The Fall and The Jesus and Mary Chain. By 1986, The Smiths had become one of Britain's most established band's, a record deal with label EMI had been agreed and they began to play larger and larger venues in the United States. However, this brought its own pressures and eventually this contributed to The Smiths splitting in the summer of 1987.

This split coincided with the rise of house music and the development of a new wave of indie bands giving the music "a psychedelic twist". The Stone Roses, combined indie, house and a "west-coast" psychedelic feel, with rhythms at the forefront of the music and instrumentals crossing into the world of dance. In 1989, they played the Empress Ballroom in Blackpool, popularising the new scene and led to the media spotlight falling on "Madchester", containing groups such as Happy Mondays and Inspiral Carpets. Blur were made to put out a record based around the Madchester sound; however, this was not the band's own sound but their record company's wishes.

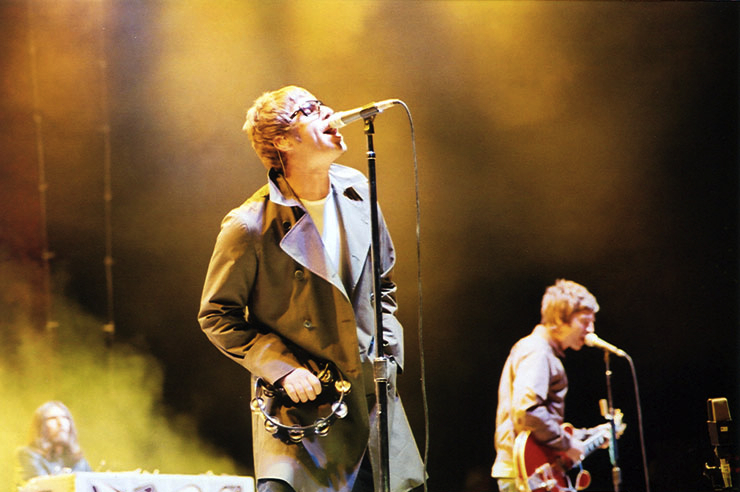
Oasis performing in 2005

In the summer of 1993, Oasis signed to Creation Records and began gigging up and down the country, then moving to London once they had an established fanbase. This was perfectly timed as the centre of Indie music had moved from Manchester to London due mainly to the influence of Suede. Suede had an image around dark glamour and sexual ambiguity, being declared the leaders of Britpop. This section is where reductive shades into absurd. Blur's second and third albums truly launched Britpop, going to the top of the album charts crossing them to mainstream, this was soon followed by Oasis' debut, creating a scene encompassing groups from Pulp to Elastica. In August 1995, Blur and Oasis had a sales battle for the number one spot with Blur getting to number one just. However, Oasis' (What's the Story) Morning Glory? became one of the biggest selling albums of all time, with them being called the "Voice of a generation". They sold out football stadiums and indoor arenas making it hard for them to find venues. In early 1996, they organised a festival at Knebworth for 250,000 people to which one in 20 people in the United Kingdom applied for tickets. However, this was as big as Indie music was going to get, as many felt they could no longer be truly called Indie.

The Libertines attempted to bring Indie music back down to earth. Like The Smiths before them, their concerts focused around direct interaction between band and audience. They also held spontaneous guerrilla gigs at fans homes and pioneered the use of the internet for bands. However, when Doherty's drug habit spun out of control, creating tension in the band, it eventually lead to their split in 2005. Multiple new guitar bands have risen to prominence in recent years, such as Franz Ferdinand and Kaiser Chiefs, with some, such as Arctic Monkeys, displaying their influence from the Libertines.

The broadcast of the VH1 episode is different from the original broadcast. The discussion of the Smiths is very reduced only mentioning their Top of the Pops performance, the closeness to the Audience and their breakup and not featuring 'Heaven Knows I'm Miserable Now'. There is also no mention of Indie bands from the 1980s other than the Smiths and the Stone Roses. There is no discussion or featuring of Live Forever. The section on Blur is very reduced, only featuring For Tomorrow and Girls and Boys, with almost all the discussion on the latter. Therefore, Blur Vs Oasis is not discussed and "Roll with It" is not featured. Coldplay are the only one of the 'market chasing' bands to feature or be mentioned, although the album covers in Tesco are still shown. The discussion of the Libertines is also curtailed with no mention of the guerilla gigs, the internet, tattoos or Can't Stand Me Now. The Kaiser Chiefs also do not feature.

== Additional material ==
As well as the television series, the BBC also produced radioshows and created the website, which contains much additional information. Also a series of short films are available on the website, usually 3–5 minutes long, most of which do not appear on the finished programmes. These are:

=== Blues-based rock ===
- The Blues: Discussion on the nature of the blues. Features Charles R. Cross, Keith Richards, Robert Plant and Roger Daltrey.

Note:Actually links to 'David Byrne on the Talking Heads', so all that is available is a clip of Cross saying "The Lyrics to the Blues had always been about Sex".

- When Dylan Went Electric: Discussion of when Dylan went electric and the influence and controversy it caused. Features Charles R. Cross, Barry Miles, David Fricke, Robbie Robertson, Joe Boyd.
- Tommy: Recollection of the creation of Tommy. Features Roger Daltrey.
- Guitarists of The Yardbirds: Discussion on the importance of the guitarists of the Yardbirds. Features David Fricke, Mike Vernon, Charles Shaar Murray, Jeff Beck, Jimmy Page and Chris Dreja.
- The Breakup of Cream: Recollection of how Cream broke up. Features Ginger Baker and Jack Bruce.

=== Art rock ===
- Wish You Were Here: Recollection of the creation of "Wish You Were Here". Features Roger Waters and David Gilmour.
- Ladytron: Recollection of the creation of "Ladytron". Features Andy Mackay, Phil Manzanera and Bryan Ferry.
- Lindsay Kemp On David Bowie: Recollection of early David Bowie. Features Lindsay Kemp.
- Shine On You Crazy Diamond: Recollection of Barrett turning up at a Pink Floyd recording after a seven-year absence. Features Richard Wright, Roger Waters, David Gilmour and Nick Mason.
- Art Schools: Discussion on the importance of Art Schools in the creation of Rock artists and groups. Features Charles Shaar Murray, Barry Miles and Pete Jenner.

=== Punk rock ===
- Talking Heads with David Byrne: Recollection of the early days of Talking Heads and the creation of "Psycho Killer". Features David Byrne.
- Anarchy in the U.K.: Recollection on the creation of Anarchy in the U.K.. Featuring John Lydon, Glen Matlock and Jon Savage
- New Rose: Discussion on the creation of New Rose and its influence. Features Charles Shaar Murray and Brian James
- CBGBs: Discussion on the importance of CBGBs. Features Bob Gruen, Charles Shaar Murray, Debbie Harry and Richard Hell.
- New York Dolls: Discussion of the New York Dolls. Features Lenny Kaye, David Johansen, Tommy Ramone and Debbie Harry.

=== Heavy metal ===
- Recording Volume 4, Bel Air, Los Angeles, Summer 1972: Recollection of the hedonistic sessions for Black Sabbath Vol. 4. Features Tony Iommi, Geezer Butler and Bill Ward.
- Grunge V Metal, 1991: Discussion on how Heavy Metal was influenced by Grunge and its merits. Features Seb Hunter, James Hetfield, Joe Elliott, Vince Neil, Lars Ulrich and Ian Gillan.
- Number of the Beast: Recollection of the creation of "The Number of the Beast" and the reaction to it. Features Steve Harris and Bruce Dickinson.
- Living After Midnight; Recording British Steel, Berkshire, England, January 1980: Recollection of the creation of Living After Midnight and the British Steel album. Features Glenn Tipton, K. K. Downing, Rob Halford,
- Recording Black Night, London, August 1969 – January 1970: Recollection of the creation of "Black Night". Features Ian Gillan and Roger Glover.
- Metallica Supports Ozzy, Master of Puppets tour 1986: Recollection of Metallica supporting Ozzy Osbourne on the Master of Puppets Tour. Features Lars Ulrich, James Hetfield and Geezer Butler.

=== Stadium rock ===
- Bruce Springsteen in Concert: Recollection of the E Street Band's experiences with Bruce Springsteen. Features Max Weinberg and Garry Tallent.
- Kiss in Cadillac: Recollection of when Kiss played a concert in Cadillac, Michigan. Features Gene Simmons, Paul Stanley and Bill Aucoin.
- Designing for Freddie Mercury: Recollection of designing costumes for Freddie Mercury. Features Zandra Rhodes.
- The Police – The Early Days: Recollection of the origins of The Police. Features Stewart Copeland and Andy Summers.
- Sultans of Swing: Recollection of the creation of "Sultans of Swing". Features Mark Knopfler.

=== Alternative rock ===
- The Origins of R.E.M.: Recollection of the formation and beginnings of R.E.M. Features Mike Mills, Michael Stipe.
- My Hardcore Punk Rock Youth: Recollection of the early days of Henry Rollins in Black Flag and hardcore. Features Henry Rollins.
- A Brief History Of The Pixies: Recollection of the history of the Pixies. Features Kim Deal and Charles Thompson.
- R.E.M. – Secrets of the Studio: Recollection of how R.E.M.'s songs "It's the End of the World as We Know It (And I Feel Fine)" and "Nightswimming" were created. Features Scott Litt, Mike Mills and Michael Stipe.
- Nirvana in Their Own Words: Recollection of Nirvana and Kurt Cobain. Features Dave Grohl and Krist Novoselic.
- Here Comes Your Man: Recollection of Here Comes Your Man. Features Kim Deal and Charles Thompson.

=== Indie rock ===
- Marr on Morrissey: Recollection of Steven Morrissey and Johnny Marr's partnership in The Smiths. Features Johnny Marr
- Spike Island: Discussion of the Stone Roses gig on Spike Island. Features Mani, John Robb, John Leckie, Noel Gallagher, Paul "Bonehead" Arthurs and Ian Tilton.
- What Defines Indie?: Discussion of the definition and origins of Indie. Features Stuart Maconie, John Leckie, June 2011, Dave Haslam, Andy Rourke and Alex Kapranos.
- Suede in Their Own Words: Recollection of Suede. Features Brett Anderson and Bernard Butler.
- Be Here Now: Recollection Be Here Now. Features Noel Gallagher and Paul "Bonehead" Arthurs.

== Audio CD ==
On 28 January 2008, an audio CD to accompany the series was released. It contains 19 tracks, 12 of which are featured in the show, 5 different songs by featured artists and 2 by artists who are mentioned but do not feature:

1. "My Generation" – The Who
2. "Sunshine of Your Love" – Cream
3. "I'm Waiting for the Man" – The Velvet Underground
4. "Space Oddity" – David Bowie
5. "Virginia Plain" – Roxy Music
6. "Jet Boy" – New York Dolls
7. "Paranoid" – Black Sabbath
8. "Smoke on the Water" – Deep Purple
9. "Sheena Is a Punk Rocker" – Ramones
10. "New Rose" – The Damned
11. "Hong Kong Garden" – Siouxsie and the Banshees
12. "I Heard It Through the Grapevine" – The Slits
13. "Vertigo" – U2
14. "In Bloom" – Nirvana
15. "I Am the Resurrection" – The Stone Roses
16. "For Tomorrow" – Blur
17. "Live Forever" – Oasis
18. "Common People" – Pulp
19. "Can't Stand Me Now" – The Libertines

== Songs featured in the series ==
Dates given are by earliest release. When cited as from an album, charting data is for the album. Recording and release dates are given if released posthumously.

Artist	Song	Release	UK Chart	US Chart	Episode
The Jimi Hendrix Experience	"Purple Haze"	1967	3	65	1
Jimi Hendrix Experience	"Wild Thing"	Rec:1967 Rel:1970 (Monterey International Pop Festival Album)	–	16	1
Jimi Hendrix	"Hear My Train A Comin'"	1970 (Band of Gypsys Album)	6	5	1
Howlin' Wolf	"How Many More Years"	1951	–	–	1
The Rolling Stones	"Little Red Rooster"	1964	1	–	1
The Rolling Stones	"(I Can't Get No) Satisfaction"	1965	1	1	1
The Yardbirds	"Over Under Sideways Down"	1966	10	–	1
Bob Dylan	"Subterranean Homesick Blues"	1965	9	39	1
Bob Dylan	"Like a Rolling Stone"	1965	4	2	1
The Who	"I Can't Explain"	1965	8	97	1
The Who	"My Generation"	1965	2	74	1
Tim Rose	"Hey Joe"	1966	–	–	1
Jimi Hendrix	"Hey Joe"	1966	6	–	1
Cream	"White Room"	1968 (Wheels of Fire Album)	3	1	1
Cream	"Crossroads"	1968 (Wheels of Fire Album)	3	1	1
Jimi Hendrix Experience	"Killing Floor"	Rec:1967 Rel:1986 (Jimi Plays Monterey Album)	–	–	1
Jimi Hendrix Experience	"Foxy Lady"	1967	6	67	1
Jimi Hendrix Experience	"Like a Rolling Stone"	Rec:1967 Rel:1970 (Monterey International Pop Festival Album)	–	16	1
The Beatles	"Sgt. Pepper's Lonely Hearts Club Band"	1967 (Sgt. Pepper's Lonely Hearts Club Band Album)	1	1	1
The Beatles	"A Day in the Life"	1967 (Sgt. Pepper's Lonely Hearts Club Band Album)	1	1	1
The Beatles	"Lucy in the Sky with Diamonds"	1967 (Sgt. Pepper's Lonely Hearts Club Band Album)	1	1	1
Jimi Hendrix	"Sgt. Pepper's Lonely Hearts Club Band"	Rec: 1970 Rel:1972 (Hendrix in the West Album)	12	–	1
Jimi Hendrix Experience	"Gypsy Eyes"	1968 ("Crosstown Traffic" B-Side)	–	52	1
Jimi Hendrix Experience	"All Along the Watchtower"	1968	20	5	1
The Rolling Stones	"Gimme Shelter"	1969 (Let It Bleed Album)	1	3	1
The Rolling Stones	"Sympathy for the Devil"	1968 (Beggars Banquet Album)	3	2	1
Jimi Hendrix	"The Star-Spangled Banner"	Rec:1970 Rel:1971 (Rainbow Bridge Album)	16	15	1
Jimi Hendrix	"Voodoo Chile"	1968 (Electric Ladyland Album)	6	1	1
Pink Floyd	"Arnold Layne"	1967	20	–	2
Pink Floyd	"See Emily Play"	1967	6	134	2
Pink Floyd	"Interstellar Overdrive"	1967 (The Piper at the Gates of Dawn Album)	6	131	2
The Velvet Underground	"White Light/White Heat"	1968	–	–	2
The Velvet Underground	"I'm Waiting for the Man"	1967 (The Velvet Underground & Nico Album)	–	171	2
The Velvet Underground	"All Tomorrow's Parties"	1966	–	–	2
The Velvet Underground	"Venus in Furs"	1967 (The Velvet Underground & Nico Album)	–	171	2
Pink Floyd	"Jugband Blues"	1968 (A Saucerful of Secrets Album)	9	–	2
David Bowie	"Space Oddity"	1969	5	15	2
Hype	"I'm Waiting for the Man"	Rec:1972 Rel:1994 (Santa Monica '72 Album)	–	–	2
David Bowie	"Ziggy Stardust"	1972 ("The Jean Genie" b-side)	2	72	2
David Bowie	"Starman"	1972	10	65	2
David Bowie	"Five Years"	1972 (The Rise and Fall of Ziggy Stardust and the Spiders from Mars Album)	5	75	2
Pink Floyd	"Echoes"	1971 (Meddle Album)	3	70	2
Pink Floyd	"Time"	1973 (The Dark Side of the Moon Album)	2	1	2
Pink Floyd	"Brain Damage"	1973 (The Dark Side of the Moon Album)	2	1	2
Pink Floyd	"Money"	1973	–	13	2
David Bowie	"Hang On to Yourself"	1971	–	–	2
Roxy Music	"Re-Make/Re-Model"	1972 (Roxy Music Album)	10	–	2
Roxy Music	"Virginia Plain"	1972	4	–	2
Roxy Music	"Ladytron"	1972 (Roxy Music Album)	10	–	2
Genesis	"I Know What I Like (In Your Wardrobe)"	1973	17	–	2
Genesis	"Supper's Ready"	1972 (Foxtrot Album)	10	–	2
Pink Floyd	"Another Brick in the Wall, Part II"	1979	1	1	2
Pink Floyd	"Goodbye Cruel World"	1979 (The Wall album)	3	1	2
Pink Floyd	"Comfortably Numb"	1979 (The Wall album)	3	1	2
Iggy and the Stooges	"No Fun"	1969 (The Stooges Album)	–	–	3
Ramones	"Blitzkrieg Bop"	1975	–	–	3
Ramones	"Now I Wanna Sniff Some Glue"	1976 (Ramones Album)	–	111	3
Ramones	"I Don't Wanna Walk Around With You"	1976 (Ramones Album)	–	111	3
Richard Hell and the Voidoids	"Blank Generation"	1976 (Another World EP track)	–	–	3
Patti Smith	"Land: Horses / Land of a Thousand Dances / La Mer (de)"	1975 (Horses Album)	–	47	3
Patti Smith	"Gloria"	1975 (Horses Album)	–	47	3
Television	"Little Johnny Jewel"	1975	–	–	3
The Damned	"New Rose"	1976	–	–	3
Sex Pistols	"Anarchy in the U.K."	1976	38	–	3
Sex Pistols	"God Save the Queen"	1977	2	–	3
Sex Pistols	"Pretty Vacant"	1977	6	93	3
The Clash	"White Riot"	1977	38	–	3
The Clash	"London Calling"	1979	11	–	3
The Clash	"(White Man) In Hammersmith Palais"	1978	32	–	3
Buzzcocks	"Boredom"	1976 (Spiral Scratch (EP))	–	–	3
The Buzzcocks	"Time's Up"	1976 ("Spiral Scratch" (EP))	–	–	3
The Buzzcocks	"Ever Fallen in Love (With Someone You Shouldn't've)"	1978	12	–	3
The Slits	"Typical Girls"	1979	60	–	3
The Slits	"Instant Hit"	1979 (Cut Album)	–	–	3
The Slits	"So Tough"	1979 (Cut Album)	–	–	3
Sex Pistols	"No Fun"	1977 (b-side to "Pretty Vacant")	28	–	3
Public Image Ltd	"Poptones"	1979 (Metal Box Album)	18	–	3
Black Sabbath	"Paranoid"	1970	4	61	4
Black Sabbath	"N.I.B."	1970	–	–	4
Black Sabbath	"Black Sabbath"	1970	–	–	4
Deep Purple	"Black Night"	1970	2	66	4
Deep Purple	"Smoke on the Water"	1972 (Machine Head Album)	–	4	4
Black Sabbath	"Snowblind"	1972	–	–	4
Black Sabbath	"Sabbath Bloody Sabbath"	1973	–	–	4
Judas Priest	"Breaking the Law"	1980	12	–	4
Judas Priest	"Rock Forever"	1978 (Killing Machine Album)	32	128	4
Judas Priest	"Hell Bent for Leather"	1978 (Killing Machine Album)	32	128	4
Judas Priest	"Living After Midnight"	1980	12	–	4
Iron Maiden	"Iron Maiden"	1979 (The Soundhouse Tapes EP)	–	–	4
Iron Maiden	"Running Free"	1980	34	–	4
Iron Maiden	"Run to the Hills"	1982	7	–	4
Iron Maiden	"The Number of the Beast"	1982	18	–	4
Mötley Crüe	"Take Me to the Top"	1981 (Too Fast For Love Album)	–	–	4
Mötley Crüe	"Looks That Kill"	1983 (Shout at the Devil Album)	–	17	4
Ozzy Osbourne	"Crazy Train"	1980	49	9 (Main. Rk)	4
Ozzy Osbourne	"Mr Crowley"	1980	46	–	4
Mötley Crüe	"Girls, Girls, Girls"	1987	26	–	4
Metallica	"No Remorse"	1983 (Kill 'Em All Album)	–	–	4
Metallica	"Master of Puppets"	1986	–	–	4
Mötley Crüe	"Dr Feelgood"	1989	50	–	4
Metallica	"Enter Sandman"	1991	5	16, 10 (Main. Rk)	4
Led Zeppelin	"Rock and Roll"	1971 (Led Zeppelin IV album)	1	2	5
Led Zeppelin	"Stairway to Heaven"	1971 (Led Zeppelin IV album)	1	2	5
Queen	"Bohemian Rhapsody"	1975	1	9	5
Queen	"We Will Rock You"	1977 ("We Are the Champions" b-side)	11	4	5
Queen	"We Are the Champions"	1977	11	4	5
Kiss	"Rock and Roll All Nite"	1975	–	68	5
Bruce Springsteen	"Thunder Road"	1975 (Born to Run Album)	36	3	5
Bruce Springsteen	"Born to Run"	1975	–	23	5
Bruce Springsteen	"Rosalita (Come Out Tonight)"	1973 (The Wild, the Innocent & the E Street Shuffle Album)	–	59	5
The Police	"Roxanne"	1978	–	–	5
The Police	"Can't Stand Losing You"	1978	42	–	5
Queen	"Crazy Little Thing Called Love"	1979	2	1	5
Queen	"I Want to Break Free"	1984	3	45	5
The Police	"Every Breath You Take"	1983	1	1	5
The Police	"Walking on the Moon"	1979	7		
5
Bruce Springsteen	"Dancing in the Dark"	1984	4	2, 1 (Main. Rk)	5
Bruce Springsteen	"Born in the U.S.A."	1984	5	9, 8 (Main. Rk)	5
Dire Straits	"Brothers in Arms"	1985	16	–	5
Dire Straits	"Money for Nothing"	1985	4	1	5
Dire Straits	"Walk of Life"	1985	7	7, 6 (Main. Rk)	5
Queen	"Radio Ga Ga"	1984	2	16	5
U2	"Sunday Bloody Sunday"	1983	–	7 (Main. Rk)	5
U2	"Bullet the Blue Sky"	1987 (The Joshua Tree Album)	1	1	5
U2	"Angel of Harlem"	1988	9	14, 1 (Main. Rk)	5
R.E.M.	"It's the End of the World as We Know It (And I Feel Fine)"	1987	39	69, 16 (Main. Rk)	6
Black Flag	Six Pack	1981	–	–	6
Black Flag	"Gimmie Gimmie Gimmie"	1981 (Damaged Album)	–	–	6
R.E.M.	"Radio Free Europe"	1981	–	–	6
The Replacements	"Here Comes a Regular"	1985 (Tim Album)	–	183	6
The Replacements	"Left of the Dial"	1985 (Tim Album)	–	183	6
Hüsker Dü	"Pink Turns to Blue"	1984 (Zen Arcade Album)	–	–	6
R.E.M.	"The One I Love"	1987	51	9, 2 (Main. Rk)	6
Mudhoney	"Touch Me I'm Sick"	1988	–	–	6
Nirvana	"About a Girl"	1989 (Bleach Album)	33, 8 (Indie)	89	6
R.E.M.	"Turn You Inside Out"	1988 (Green album)	27	10	6
R.E.M.	"Losing My Religion"	1991	4	19, 1 (Main. Rk/Mod. Rk)	6
Nirvana	"Verse Chorus Verse"	Recorded: 1991 Released: 2004 (Outtake from Nevermind Album, Released on "With the Lights Out")	–	–	6
Pearl Jam	"Alive"	1991 (Ten Album)	18	2	6
Pixies	"Gouge Away"	1989 (Doolittle Album)	8, 1 (Indie)	98	6
Pixies	"Where Is My Mind?"	1988 (Surfer Rosa Album)	8, 2 (Indie)	98	6
Nirvana	"Smells Like Teen Spirit"	1991	7	6, 1 (Mod. Rk)	6
Nirvana	"Something in the Way"	1991 (Nevermind Album)	7	1	6
R.E.M.	"Nightswimming"	1992 (Automatic for the People Album)	1	2	6
R.E.M.	"Everybody Hurts"	1992 (Automatic for the People Album)	1	2	6
Nirvana	"Serve the Servants"	1993 (In Utero Album)	1	1	6
Nirvana	"Come as You Are"	1991 (Nevermind Album)	7	1	6
Nirvana	"Where Did You Sleep Last Night?"	Recorded: 1993 Released: 1994 (MTV Unplugged in New York Album)	1	1	6
The Smiths	"This Charming Man"	1983	25, 1 (Indie)	–	7
The Smiths	"Heaven Knows I'm Miserable Now"	1984	12, 1 (Indie)	–	7
The Jesus and Mary Chain	"In a Hole"	1985 (Psychocandy Album)	31	188	7
The Smiths	"Hand in Glove"	1983	124, 3 (Indie)	–	7
The Stone Roses	"Waterfall"	1989 (The Stone Roses Album)	9, 1 (Indie)	86	7
The Stone Roses	"I Wanna Be Adored"	1989 (The Stone Roses Album)	9, 1 (Indie)	86	7
The Stone Roses	"I Am the Resurrection"	1989	8	–	7
Happy Mondays	"Step On"	1990	5	57, 9 (Mod. Rk)	7
Inspiral Carpets	"She Comes in the Fall"	1990	27	–	7
Blur	"There's No Other Way"	1991	8	82, 5 (Mod. Rk)	7
Oasis	"I Am the Walrus"	1994 ("Cigarettes and Alcohol" B-Side)	7	–	7
Oasis	"Live Forever"	1994	10	2 (Mod. Rk)	7
Suede	"Metal Mickey"	1992	17, 1 (Indie)	7 (Mod. Rk)	7
Suede	"Animal Nitrate"	1993	7, 1 (Indie)	–	7
Blur	"For Tomorrow"	1993	28	–	7
Blur	"Girls & Boys"	1994	5	59, 4 (Mod. Rk)	7
Oasis	"Shakermaker"	1994	11, 1 (Indie)	–	7
Oasis	"Cigarettes & Alcohol"	1994	7	–	7
Blur	"Country House"	1995	1	–	7
Oasis	"Roll with It"	1995	2, 1 (Indie)	–	7
Oasis	"Wonderwall"	1995	2, 1 (Indie)	8, 1 (Mod. Rk)	7
Oasis	"Champagne Supernova"	1995 ((What's the Story) Morning Glory? Album)	1	4	7
Coldplay	"Yellow"	2000	4	48, 6 (Mod. Rk)	7
Stereophonics	Have a Nice Day	2001	5	–	7
The Libertines	"The Boys in the Band"	2002 (Up the Bracket Album)	35	–	7
The Libertines	"The Boy Looked at Johnny"	2002 (Up the Bracket Album)	35	–	7
The Libertines	"Can't Stand Me Now"	2004	2, 1 (Indie)	–	7
Arctic Monkeys	"I Bet You Look Good on the Dancefloor"	2005	1, 1 (Indie)	103, 7 (Mod. Rk)	7
Franz Ferdinand	"Do You Want To"	2005	4	76, 9 (Mod. Rk)	7
Kaiser Chiefs	"Na Na Na Na Naa"	2005 (Employment Album)	2	86	7
Franz Ferdinand	"Take Me Out"	2004	3, 1 (Indie)	66, 3 (Mod. Rk)	7

== Featured artists who are listed only on the BBC website ==
Artist	Years active	"Key Releases"	Year of releases	UK Chart	US Chart	"Related Programme"
John Mayall & the Bluesbreakers	1963–1970; 1982–2008	Blues Breakers with Eric Clapton	1966	6	–	The Birth of Rock
Radiohead	1985–	OK Computer	1997	1	21	What the World Is Waiting For
Talking Heads	1974–1991	'77	1977	–	–	Blank Generation\ Left of the Dial
John Cale	1965–	Fear	1974	–	–	Blank Generation
New York Dolls	1971–77	New York Dolls	1973	–	111	Blank Generation
The Strokes	1998–	Is This It	2001	2	–	What The World Is Waiting For
The White Stripes	1997–2011	White Blood Cells	2001	55	61	What the World Is Waiting For
