= Andy Pratt =

Andy Pratt may refer to:

- Andy Pratt (baseball) (born 1979), former Major League Baseball pitcher
- Andy Pratt (singer-songwriter) (born 1947), American singer-songwriter and musician
  - Andy Pratt (album)

== See also ==
- Andrew Pratt (born 1975), English cricketer
- Pratt (surname)
