= 2HB =

Song by Roxy Music

from the album Roxy Music
- Released: June 1972
- Recorded: 24 March 1972
- Studio: Command Studios, London
- Genre: Art rock
- Length: 4:30
- Label: E.G.
- Songwriter: Bryan Ferry
- Producer: Peter Sinfield

"2HB" is a song written by Bryan Ferry and first recorded by Roxy Music for their 1972 debut album, Roxy Music. Ferry also recorded a version for his 1976 solo album, Let's Stick Together.

The title is a dedication to the film star Humphrey Bogart ("2HB" = "To Humphrey Bogart"). In particular, the song references the Bogart classic Casablanca.

The instrumentation on the Roxy Music recording is dominated by Ferry's Hohner Pianet N electric piano and features an Andy Mackay sax solo—based on the melody of "As Time Goes By", a song featured prominently in Casablanca—that is treated with tape echo effects by Brian Eno.

== Covers and references ==
This song was covered for the 1998 film Velvet Goldmine by the supergroup The Venus in Furs, made up of Bernard Butler, Clune, Jonny Greenwood, Paul Kimble, Andy Mackay, and Thom Yorke. Ferry covered his own song on his 1976 solo album Let's Stick Together.

The English band Madness recorded a tribute song, "4BF" ("for Bryan Ferry"), on their 1988 album The Madness. The early Human League song "4JG" ("for J. G. Ballard") was also inspired by "2HB".

Julia Holter, a Los Angeles-based composer/multi-instrumentalist, released a stripped-down version of "2HB" on her album Maria, released in 2014.

== Personnel ==
- Andy MacKay – tenor saxophone
- Bryan Ferry – vocals, Hohner Pianet N
- Brian Eno – tape echo effects
- Phil Manzanera – guitar
- Graham Simpson – bass guitar
- Paul Thompson – drums
