= Written on the Wind (song) =

Single by Roger Daltrey

from the album One of the Boys
- Released: 14 April 1977
- Genre: Rock; soft rock
- Length: 3:23
- Label: Polydor
- Songwriter: Paul Korda
- Producers: David Courtney; Tony Meehan

Roger Daltrey singles chronology
"Peace at Last" (1975)	"Written on the Wind" (1977)	"Avenging Annie" (1977)

Music video
- "Written on the Wind" on YouTube

"Written on the Wind" is a song by the Who's lead vocalist, Roger Daltrey. The song was written by Paul Korda, who plays piano on the recording. The song was released as a single by Polydor Records in the UK on 14 April 1977, and reached and peaked at No. 46 on the UK singles chart but only stayed in the charts for two weeks. It was not released in the US.

The song was included on Daltrey's third solo studio album, One of the Boys, in 1977. The album No. 46 in the US (the same position as the single in the UK).
