= William Naylor (disambiguation) =

William Naylor may refer to:

- Bill Naylor (1919-1989), English footballer
- Bill Naylor (footballer, born 1924) (1924-2011), English footballer see List of Oldham Athletic A.F.C. players
- William Naylor, Producer
