= If There Is Something =

Song by Roxy Music

from the album Roxy Music
- Released: June 1972
- Recorded: 17 March 1972 at Command Studios, 221 Piccadilly, London W1
- Genre: Progressive rock; art rock; glam rock
- Length: 6:34
- Label: E.G.
- Songwriter: Bryan Ferry
- Producer: Peter Sinfield

"If There Is Something" is a song written by Bryan Ferry and recorded by Roxy Music for their eponymous debut album in 1972. A live version appears on their Viva! live album.

== Song structure and themes ==
The song begins in a rather light-hearted, jaunty fashion, a slight pastiche of country music, with honky tonk style piano and twangy guitar. Ferry's singing is nonchalant and jocular.

However the mood of the song builds with a repeated instrumental motif played between guitar and saxophone, Ferry's vocals re-entering to provide a fraught vocal climax.

The instrumental motifs then return, often featuring Andy Mackay, before finally giving way to an emotional end section where Ferry's impassioned and melancholy vocals are set on top of a lush blend of backing vocals and the mellotron "three violins" tape set.

It has been said that the first part of the song is a youth wondering about love, the second part adults in the heat of passion and the third part the singer in old age thinking about their past love.

== Live performances ==
The song was played on all the early Roxy Music tours and the instrumental passages were extended greatly, increasing the length of the song from 6:34 to sometimes over 12 minutes. On 18 February 1972, the BBC sessions aired a performance of over 11 minutes.

During the Country Life tour the song was also performed, and the performance at Newcastle City Hall on 27 or 28 October 1974 was used for the 1976 live album Viva!.

After 1975 however, the song was no longer played until the Roxy Music Reunion tour in 2001. A live version from this tour appears on the "Live" album.

The song was played again live during the 2022 'Roxy Music' Tour, which was scheduled to coincide with the 50th anniversary of the release of their eponymous debut album.

== Personnel ==
Roxy Music

- Andy Mackay - saxophone, oboe, backing vocals
- Bryan Ferry - vocals, piano, mellotron
- Brian Eno - EMS VCS 3 synth, backing vocals
- Graham Simpson - bass guitar
- Paul Thompson - drums
- Phil Manzanera - guitar

(on Viva! version)

- Eddie Jobson - electric violin, synthesizer, keyboards

== Cover versions ==
- Tin Machine covered the song on their 1991 album Tin Machine II. They also recorded a live version for their 1992 album Tin Machine Live: Oy Vey, Baby.

== Use in films ==
The song appears in the 2008 film Flashbacks of a Fool starring Daniel Craig where it features centrally in a scene where the main protagonist's younger self dances to the song with his girlfriend while made up as Bryan Ferry.
