= Ride a Rock Horse =

Studio album by Roger Daltrey
- Released: 4 July 1975
- Recorded: November 1974–February 1975
- Studios: Ramport and CBS Studios
- Genres: Rock; soft rock
- Length: 37:57
- Labels: Track (UK), MCA (US)
- Producer: Russ Ballard

Roger Daltrey chronology
Daltrey (1973)	Ride a Rock Horse (1975)	One of the Boys (1977)

Singles from Ride a Rock Horse
- 1. "Get Your Love" Released: 30 May 1975; 2. "Walking the Dog" Released: August 1975; 3. "Oceans Away" Released: January 1976

Ride a Rock Horse is the second solo studio album by the English singer Roger Daltrey, released on 4 July 1975 by Track in the UK and MCA in the US. Ride a Rock Horse was recorded during Daltrey's filming commitments for Ken Russell's film Lisztomania. The album's cover, which is photographed and designed by Daltrey's cousin Graham Hughes, depicts the singer as an exuberant centaur.

Three singles were issued from Ride a Rock Horse: "Get Your Love", "Walking the Dog" and "Oceans Away". "Get Your Love" peaked at No. 68 on the US Billboard Hot 100 and "Walking the Dog", a cover of the Rufus Thomas song, peaked at No. 52 on the UK Singles Chart. The album itself peaked at No. 14 on the UK Albums Chart and at No. 28 on the US Billboard 200. The song, "Hearts Right", had a music video with graphics and animation by Gerald Scarfe, who would later become known for his work with Pink Floyd.

Professional ratings
Review scores
Source	Rating
AllMusic	link

== Track listing ==
Side one
No.	Title	Writer(s)	Length
1.	"Get Your Love"	Russ Ballard	3:46
2.	"Hearts Right"	Paul Korda	3:02
3.	"Oceans Away"	Phillip Goodhand-Tait	3:17
4.	"Proud"	Ballard	4:54
5.	"World Over"	Korda	3:11

Side two
No.	Title	Writer(s)	Length
6.	"Near to Surrender"	Ballard	2:35
7.	"Feeling"	Korda	4:38
8.	"Walking the Dog"	Rufus Thomas	4:37
9.	"Milk Train"	Dominic Bugatti, Frank Musker	3:21
10.	"I Was Born to Sing Your Song"	Chris Neal, Donny Marchand	4:36

=== Non-album material ===
1. "You Put Something Better Inside Me" (Gerry Rafferty, Joe Egan) (B-side of the 1977 single "One of the Boys"; this version is an alternate outtake)
2. "Dear John" (David Courtney) (B-side of the 1977 single "Written on the Wind"; the liner notes to the reissue CD state that this was an outtake from the Ride a Rock Horse sessions)
3. "Oceans Away (alternate version)" (Goodhand-Tait)

== Personnel ==
- Roger Daltrey - vocals
- Russ Ballard - guitar, keyboards, backing vocals
- Clem Clempson - guitar solo on "Feeling"
- Dave Wintour - bass guitar
- Stuart Francis - drums
- John Barham - string and brass arrangements
- Paul Korda - piano, backing vocals
- Henry Spinetti - drums
- Tony Meehan - congas, strings, horns, reeds
- Alan Wicket - shakers on "Walking the Dog"
- Phil Kenzie - saxophone (2, 4, 8)
- Nick Newall - alto saxophone (2, 8)
- Alan Brown - trumpet
- Kokomo, Paul Gorda, Sweedies - backing vocals

Technical

- John Jansen, Will Reid-Dick - engineer
- Graham Hughes - photography, art direction

== Charts ==
Chart (1975)	Peak position
Australian Albums (Kent Music Report)	10
Canada Top Albums/CDs (RPM)	46
UK Albums (Official Charts)	14
US Billboard 200	28

== Certifications ==
Region	Certification	Certified units/sales
United Kingdom (BPI)	Silver	60,000^{^}
^{^} Shipments figures based on certification alone.

== Release history ==
Region	Date	Label	Format	Catalog
United Kingdom	4 July 1975	Polydor Records	stereo LP	Polydor 2442 135
United States	26 July 1975	MCA Records	stereo LP	MCA 2147

== See also ==
- Roger Daltrey discography
