= Athans =

Athans is a surname. Notable people with the surname include:

- Gary Athans (born 1961), Canadian alpine skier
- George Athans (born 1952), Canadian water skier
- George Athans (diver) (1921–2007), Canadian diver
- Gina Athans (born 1984), South African model
- Greg Athans (1955–2006), Canadian freestyle skier
- Michael Athans (1937–2020), Greek engineer
- Peter Athans (born 1957), American mountain climber
- Philip Athans (born 1964), American writer
- Tom Athans (born 1961), American businessman

== See also ==
- Athan
