= Let's Stick Together =

1976 album by Bryan Ferry

Let’s Stick Together

Compilation album by Bryan Ferry
- Released: 10 September 1976
- Recorded: 1973–76
- Studio: AIR (London); Island (London)
- Genre: R&B; glam rock
- Length: 38:45
- Label: E.G.
- Producer: Chris Thomas; Bryan Ferry

Bryan Ferry chronology
Another Time, Another Place (1974)	Let’s Stick Together (1976)	In Your Mind (1977)

Let's Stick Together is a 1976 album by the English singer Bryan Ferry. His third solo release, it was his first following the disbanding of Roxy Music earlier in the year. Unlike Ferry's two previous solo releases, Let’s Stick Together was not a dedicated album project, instead predominantly made up of singles, B-sides, and an EP. Three tracks were exclusive to the LP, all remakes of Roxy Music tracks: "Casanova", "2HB", and "Chance Meeting". It had a generally favourable critical reception, but only just made the UK Top 20.

== Production ==
Five of the tracks on the album were remakes of Bryan Ferry songs previously recorded with Roxy Music. "Re-Make/Re-Model", "2HB", "Chance Meeting" and "Sea Breezes" were from the band's self-titled debut album (1972), while "Casanova" was taken from Country Life (1974). In most cases the re-recordings were smoother and more oriented to jazz and R&B than the original Roxy Music versions.

The other six tracks on the album were covers. The sax-driven "Let's Stick Together" was written and originally recorded by Wilbert Harrison. It was remixed in 1988 for the compilation The Ultimate Collection. Other up-tempo numbers were The Everly Brothers' "The Price of Love" and Jimmy Reed's "Shame, Shame, Shame" (which includes a counter-vocal by the backing singers which quotes Marvin Gaye's "Can I Get a Witness"). The remaining covers, which included the Beatles' "It's Only Love", were performed in a mellow cabaret style.

"2HB" (a tribute to Humphrey Bogart) had been released as the B-side of Ferry's single "A Hard Rain's a-Gonna Fall" in September 1973. "Chance Meeting" was the B-side of "The 'In' Crowd" in May 1974. "You Go to My Head" b/w "Re-Make/Re-Model" had been released as a single in June 1975, making #33 in the UK charts. "Let’s Stick Together" b/w "Sea Breezes" was released in June 1976, making #4. The Extended Play EP, featuring "The Price of Love" and "Shame, Shame, Shame" b/w "Heart on My Sleeve" and "It’s Only Love", was released in August 1976, making #7. "Casanova" - a version of which appeared on Roxy Music's 1974 album "Country Life" - was recorded in the "Another Time, Another Place" sessions in 1974 and eventually issued as the B-side of Ferry's cover of The Velvet Underground's "What Goes On" in May 1978. The song "Let's Stick Together" was re-released in 1988 as "Let's Stick Together '88", making #12.

Various Roxy Music members were involved in the recordings, including Paul Thompson on drums, Eddie Jobson on violin and synthesizer, John Gustafson and John Porter on bass, and Phil Manzanera and David O'List on guitar. Jerry Hall made an appearance in tiger skin costume, complete with tail, on the title track's video clip, and did the song's yelps in the chorus.

== Critical reception ==
Professional ratings
Review scores
Source	Rating
AllMusic	4/5 stars
Christgau's Record Guide	B
The Rolling Stone Album Guide	3/5 stars

Reviewing for AllMusic, Ned Raggett wrote of the album: "As Roxy approached its mid- to late-'70s hibernation, Ferry came up with another fine solo album, though one of his most curious." According to Robert Christgau, "A lot of people are crazy about this record, but I find its bifurcation alienating." He added: "Although Ferry proves that he knows more about making records (and music) than he used to, the songs remain powerful, strange, and interesting—but not quite compelling. Add it all together and you get ... two separate parts."

== Track listing ==
No.	Title	Writer(s)	Length
1.	"Let's Stick Together" (cover of the 1962 Wilbert Harrison single)	Wilbert Harrison	3:00
2.	"Casanova" (remake; originally on the album Country Life (1974) by Roxy Music)	Bryan Ferry	2:45
3.	"Sea Breezes" (remake; originally on the album Roxy Music (1972) by Roxy Music)	Ferry	6:10
4.	"Shame, Shame, Shame" (cover)	Jimmy Reed	3:15
5.	"2HB" (remake; originally on the album Roxy Music (1972) by Roxy Music)	Ferry	3:50
6.	"The Price of Love" (The Everly Brothers cover from the album In Our Image (1966))	Don & Phil Everly	3:25
7.	"Chance Meeting" (remake; originally on the album Roxy Music (1972) by Roxy Music)	Ferry	3:35
8.	"It's Only Love" (The Beatles cover from the album Help! (1965))	John Lennon, Paul McCartney	3:45
9.	"You Go to My Head" (cover)	J. Fred Coots (music), Haven Gillespie (lyrics)	2:50
10.	"Re-Make/Re-Model" (remake; originally on the album Roxy Music (1972) by Roxy Music)	Ferry	2:40
11.	"Heart on My Sleeve" (Gallagher and Lyle cover from the album Breakaway (1976))	Benny Gallagher, Graham Lyle	3:30

== Personnel ==
- Bryan Ferry – vocals, keyboards, harmonica
- Eddie Jobson – synthesizers, violin
- Chris Spedding – guitars
- Neil Hubbard – lead guitar (2)
- David O'List – lead guitar (7)
- Phil Manzanera – lead guitar (10)
- John Wetton – bass (1, 2, 4, 6–9, 11)
- Rick Wills – bass (3)
- John Porter – bass (5)
- John Gustafson – bass (10)
- Paul Thompson – drums
- Morris Pert – percussion
- Mel Collins – soprano saxophone
- Chris Mercer – tenor saxophone
- Martin Drover – trumpet
- Ann Odell – string arrangements (4)
- Vicki Brown – chorus
- Doreen Chanter – chorus
- Helen Chappelle – chorus
- Paddie McHugh – chorus
- Jackie Sullivan – chorus
- Martha Walker – chorus

== Production ==
- Bryan Ferry – producer
- Chris Thomas – producer
- Steve Nye – engineer
- John Punter – engineer
- Nigel Walker – assistant engineer
- Jon Walls – assistant engineer
- Richard Wallis – photography

== Charts ==
=== Weekly charts ===
Chart (1976)	Peak position
Australian Albums (Kent Music Report)	1
Dutch Albums (Album Top 100)	1
New Zealand Albums (RMNZ)	28
Norwegian Albums (VG-lista)	19
Swedish Albums (Sverigetopplistan)	7
UK Albums (Official Charts)	19
US Billboard 200	160

=== Year-end charts ===
Chart (1976)	Peak position
Australia (Kent Music Report)	9
