= One of the Boys (Roger Daltrey album) =

Studio album by Roger Daltrey
- Released: 13 May 1977
- Recorded: November 1976–March 1977
- Studios: Ramport Studios, London and Pathe Marconi Studios, Paris
- Genres: Rock; punk rock; country rock; soft rock
- Length: 39:19
- Labels: Polydor – 2442 146 (UK); MCA – MCA 2271 (US)
- Producers: David Courtney, Tony Meehan

Roger Daltrey chronology
Ride a Rock Horse (1975)	One of the Boys (1977)	McVicar (1980)

Singles from One of the Boys
- 1. "Written on the Wind" Released: 15 April 1977; 2. "One of the Boys" Released: 24 June 1977; 3. "Avenging Annie" Released: September 1977 (US); 4. "Say It Ain't So Joe" Released: 21 October 1977; 5. "Leon" Released: 1978

One of the Boys is the third solo studio album by the Who's lead vocalist, Roger Daltrey. It was released in 1977, on Polydor in the UK, and MCA in the US. The sessions were recorded at the Who's Ramport Studios during the winter of 1976 (vocals were recorded at Pathe Marconi Studios in Paris, due to tax complications), and Daltrey allowed students from the local Battersea technical school to film them as an educational project. This also marked the first time that Daltrey had written or co-written a song since "Here for More" (released as the B-side of the Who's "The Seeker") in 1970, and Lisztomania in 1975. Daltrey's original choice for producers were Jerry Leiber and Mike Stoller, but they declined.

When Leo Sayer launched his own career as a singer, Daltrey called on a widening group of friends to write for and perform on his (Daltrey's) albums. Paul McCartney contributed the new song "Giddy" to One of the Boys, where the band included Hank B. Marvin of the Shadows, Eric Clapton, Alvin Lee and Mick Ronson, as well as calling on a member of the Who, John Entwistle.

== Album cover art ==
On this cover, after releasing Ride a Rock Horse with Daltrey as a rampant centaur, another visual trick is played with Daltrey's mirror image, with reference to Magritte's famous painting Not to Be Reproduced, photographed and designed by Daltrey's cousin Graham Hughes.

== Tracks background ==
"Parade" is a cover song originally released on Phillip Goodhand-Tait's sixth solo album, Teaching an Old Dog New Tricks, in 1976.

"Single Man's Dilemma" was written by Colin Blunstone for Daltrey. Blunstone is the lead vocalist for The Zombies.

"Avenging Annie" is a cover song originally released on Andy Pratt's second solo album, Andy Pratt, in 1973. The song was released as a single (by Daltrey) in October 1977, reaching No. 88 in the US, but was not released in the UK.

"Leon" was written and recorded by Phillip Goodhand-Tait in 1972 and originally released on his third album Songfall. The song was released as a single (by Daltrey) in April 1978 but did not chart and was not released in the UK.

"One of the Boys" was written by Steve Gibbons about Daltrey. Gibbons did his own version live in 1977; a recording was released on his live album, Caught in the Act. The song was released as a single (by Daltrey) in June 1977 but did not chart; the song was not released in the US.

"Giddy" was written by the Beatles' Paul McCartney for Daltrey, The song started off as a demo called "Rode All Night"; the refrain was later incorporated into "Giddy".

"Written on the Wind" was written by Paul Korda for Daltrey. The song features Korda playing piano; it was released as a single in April 1977, reaching No. 46 in the UK, but was not released in the US.

"Say It Ain't So, Joe" is a cover of song originally released on Murray Head's second solo album, Say It Ain't So, in 1975. The song was released as a single (by Daltrey) in July 1977 but did not chart; it was not released in the UK. The song was rereleased in February 1978 with a different B-side.

== Critical reception ==
Professional ratings
Review scores
Source	Rating
AllMusic	3/5 stars
MusicHound Rock: The Essential Album Guide	1/5 stars
Rolling Stone	(favourable)

Writing for AllMusic, critic William Ruhlmann said that "Roger Daltrey called on a wider circle of friends for his third album and came up with a more varied collection of songs ... But Daltrey was never in danger of getting lost in the all-star session. Nevertheless, the album was not treated as a major release and found only modest commercial success."

== Track listing ==
Side one
No.	Title	Writer(s)	Length
1.	"Parade"	Phillip Goodhand-Tait	3:41
2.	"Single Man's Dilemma"	Colin Blunstone	3:03
3.	"Avenging Annie"	Andy Pratt	4:32
4.	"The Prisoner"	David Courtney, Todd, Daltrey	3:32
5.	"Leon"	Goodhand-Tait	4:47

Side two
No.	Title	Writer(s)	Length
6.	"One of the Boys"	Steve Gibbons	2:45
7.	"Giddy"	Paul McCartney	4:47
8.	"Say It Ain't So, Joe"	Murray Head	4:16
9.	"Written on the Wind"	Paul Korda	3:23
10.	"Satin and Lace"	David Courtney, Tony Meehan, Daltrey	4:06
11.	"Doing It All Again"	Courtney, Meehan, Daltrey	2:27
Total length:			39:19

=== Bonus tracks (2005 reissue) ===
No.	Title	Writer(s)	Length
1.	"You Put Something Better Inside Me"	Gerry Rafferty, Joe Egan	3:48
2.	"Martyrs and Madmen"	Steve Swindells	4:17
3.	"Treachery"	Swindells	4:58
Total length:			12:23

== Personnel ==
An advert for the album.

- Roger Daltrey - lead vocals, harmonica
- Alvin Lee - guitar
- Jimmy McCulloch - guitar
- Paul Keogh - guitar
- Hank B. Marvin - guitar
- Eric Clapton - guitar
- Mick Ronson - guitar
- Brian Odgers - bass guitar
- John Entwistle - bass guitar, "Boris" vocals on "One of the Boys" and "Avenging Annie"
- Rod Argent - keyboards
- Paul Korda - piano on "Written on the Wind"
- Phil Kenzie - saxophone
- Jimmy Jewell - saxophone
- Stuart Tosh - drums
- Andy Fairweather-Low - backing vocals
- John Perry - backing vocals
- Tony Rivers - backing vocals
- Stuart Calver - backing vocals

Engineering

- Tony Meehan - arrangements
- Phil McDonald - engineer
- Judy Szekely - assistant engineer
- Nigel Walker - assistant engineer

Album cover art

- Graham Hughes - photography, design
- Ian Murray - typography

== Charts ==
Chart (1977)	Peak position
Australian Albums (Kent Music Report)	80
UK Albums (Official Charts)	45
US Billboard 200	46

== See also ==
- Roger Daltrey discography
