= Re-Make/Re-Model =

Song by Roxy Music

from the album Roxy Music
- Released: June 1972
- Recorded: 27–29 March 1972
- Studio: Command Studios, London
- Genre: Art rock; glam rock
- Length: 5:14
- Label: E.G.
- Songwriter(s): Bryan Ferry
- Producer(s): Peter Sinfield

"Re-Make/Re-Model" is a song written by Bryan Ferry that appears as the opening track on Roxy Music's debut album.

The recording starts with some brief background ambiance of a cocktail party, before launching into the song. Whilst the basic backing track of guitar, acoustic piano, bass guitar, tenor saxophone and drums is relatively straightforward and traditional in form, other elements of the arrangement are quite bizarre and futuristic: Eno plays continual squalls of atonal oscillator noise using Andy MacKay's VCS3 synthesizer, whilst Ferry's lead vocal style is strikingly distraught and anguished in tone. The lead guitar and saxophone solos in the middle of the song also tend to cacophony. In the song, each instrument is allowed a short solo break in turn; the sax mimics the trumpets from Richard Wagner's opera "the Valkyrie" and the bass guitar solo mimics the riff from the Beatles song "Day Tripper". Phil Manzanera's guitar part reverses the usual guitar pattern: he plays single-note lead guitar all through the song, with no chords, but his solo break consists only of chords.

The lyrics describe a man who likes the look of a woman, but is afraid to approach her. Ferry explained in an interview that Eno and MacKay's backing vocal chorus of "CPL 593H" was the number plate of the car in which the woman is riding. On his way to the recording studio, Ferry had seen a beautiful woman riding a car with this number plate, and decided to use it in a song.

Ferry reworked Re-Make/Re-Model on his Let's Stick Together album (1976). The song was covered by Frank Black on his Oddballs collection of B-sides and rarities and he performed it live while touring with The Catholics. The song was performed in concert by Scott Miller's band The Loud Family, and Portland post-punk band Glass Candy released a cover of the song (titled "Nueva Version/Remodela") as the B-side to their 2003 single "Bicicleta Emocional." Other versions of the song also appear on several of their tour CD-Rs. Weasel Walter's group Cellular Chaos also covered it in 2012.

== Musicians ==
- Bryan Ferry: piano, lead vocals
- Brian Eno: VCS3, backing vocals
- Andy MacKay: tenor saxophone, backing vocals
- Graham Simpson: bass guitar
- Phil Manzanera: electric guitar, backing vocals
- Paul Thompson: drums
