= Resolution (Andy Pratt album) =

Studio album by Andy Pratt
- Released: May 1976
- Studio: Various: Columbia Recording Studios; Atlantic Studios; Sound Ideas Studios; Northern Studios
- Genre: Rock; soft rock; religious
- Length: 37:06
- Label: Nemperor
- Producer: Arif Mardin

Andy Pratt chronology
Andy Pratt (1973)	Resolution (1976)	Shiver in the Night (1977)

Professional ratings
Review scores
Source	Rating
AllMusic	4.5/5 stars
Christgau's Record Guide	B

Resolution is the third studio album by American singer-songwriter Andy Pratt, released in 1976 by Nemperor, and distributed by Atlantic. It was Pratt's first album of entirely new music since his second Andy Pratt in 1973. The album was produced by Bee Gees producer Arif Mardin, who was recruited for a more commercial approach.

On release, Pratt received a positive critical reception, it is also his best selling album, but had only modest commercial success.

== Critical reception ==
Many critics have praised the album. Reviewing the album Rolling Stone magazine wrote, "By reviving the dream of rock as an art and then re-inventing it, Pratt has forever changed the face of rock". And in a retrospective review for AllMusic, critic Michael Ofjord gave the album four and a half out of five stars and wrote that "Although this album never attained the commercial success that many predicted, it remains a classic that deserves to be heard by a wide audience."

On the other hand, reviewing the album in his consumer guide for The Village Voice, Robert Christgau gave the album a B and claimed that the album is "Sententious pop at its best, recommended only to those whose taste for such junk amounts to a jones."

== Track listing ==
All tracks are written by Andy Pratt, except where noted.

Side one
No.	Title	Writer(s)	Length
1.	"Resolution"		3:13
2.	"If You Could See Yourself (Through My Eyes)"	Andy Pratt; Lillian Rubin	3:07
3.	"Constant Heat"		3:49
4.	"Karen's Song"	Mark Doyle; Pratt	3:21
5.	"Can't Stop My Love"		3:08
6.	"Everything Falls into Place (Lillian's Song)"		3:45

Side two
No.	Title	Length
7.	"That's When Miracles Occur"	3:52
8.	"Some Things Go On Forever"	3:10
9.	"Treasure That Canary"	3:32
10.	"Set Your Sights"	3:02
11.	"Love Song"	3:07
Total length:		37:06

== Personnel ==
Credits are adapted from the album's liner notes.

- Andy Pratt – lead and background vocals; piano; percussion
- Mark Doyle – lead and bass guitars; piano; percussion
- Andy Mendelson – organ; synthesizer
- Ken Bichel – synthesizer; mellotron
- Richard Mendelson – drums; percussion
- Andy Newmark – drums
- Stephen Gadd – drums
- Tony Levin – bass guitars
- Hugh McDonald – bass guitars
- Arif Mardin – string arrangements; horn arrangements; percussion
- Ruben Bassini – percussion
- Carlos Martin – congas
- The Rowans – backing vocals
- Luther Vandross – backing vocals
- David Lasley – backing vocals
- Diane Sumler – backing vocals

== Chart performance ==
=== Peak position ===
Chart	Peak Position
U.S. Billboard 200 Chart	104
