= Perfect Therapy =

Studio album by Andy Pratt
- Released: 1986
- Genre: Pop; soft rock; Christian rock
- Label: GMI

Andy Pratt chronology
Not Just for Dancing (1983)	Perfect Therapy (1986)	Life (1988)

Professional ratings
Review scores
Source	Rating
AllMusic	3.5/5 stars

Perfect Therapy is the eighth studio album by American singer-songwriter Andy Pratt, released in 1986 by GMI.

== Track listing ==
1. "Where Is the Comfort" – 5:11
2. "Let Me See Your Face" – 4:27
3. "Pass Away" – 5:32
4. "More Than the Sky" – 3:28
5. "Now We Are One" – 2:47
6. "What's Gonna Happen to You" – 3:50
7. "Masterpiece" – 3:38
8. "Was It for Life" – 4:05
9. "I Let It Go" – 4:40
10. "How Lovely Is Your Dwelling Place" – 5:54
