= Roxy Music (album) =

Studio album by Roxy Music
- Released: 16 June 1972
- Recorded: 14–29 March 1972
- Studio: Command (London)
- Genres: Glam rock; art rock; avant-pop
- Length: 42:15
- Labels: Island; Reprise
- Producer: Peter Sinfield

Roxy Music chronology
Roxy Music (1972)	For Your Pleasure (1973)

Singles from Roxy Music
- 1. "Virginia Plain" Released: 4 August 1972 (not included on original pressings of album)

Roxy Music is the debut studio album by the English rock band Roxy Music, released on 16 June 1972 by Island Records.

It was generally well received by contemporary critics and made it to number 10 in the UK Albums Chart.

== Music and lyrics ==
The opening track, "Re-Make/Re-Model", has been labelled a postmodernist pastiche, featuring solos by each member of the band echoing various touchstones of Western music, including The Beatles' "Day Tripper", Duane Eddy's version of "Peter Gunn", and Wagner's "Ride of the Valkyries"; the esoteric "CPL 593H" was supposedly the registration number of a car spotted by Bryan Ferry that was driven by a beautiful woman. Brian Eno produced some self-styled "lunacy" when Ferry asked him for a sound "like the Moon" for the track "Ladytron". "If There Is Something" was covered by David Bowie's Tin Machine, and was later featured quite extensively, almost as a central figure, in the British film Flashbacks of a Fool.

Several of the album's songs were thematically linked to films. "2HB", with its punning title, was Ferry's tribute to Humphrey Bogart and quoted the line "Here's looking at you, kid" made famous by the 1942 film Casablanca; "Chance Meeting" was inspired by David Lean's Brief Encounter (1945). "The Bob" took its title from Battle of Britain (1968) and included a passage simulating the sound of gunfire.

Discussing the music, Andy Mackay later said "we certainly didn't invent eclecticism but we did say and prove that rock 'n' roll could accommodate – well, anything really".

== Production and cover art ==
The band had been rehearsing and re-working the songs for a couple of months before they finally found a recording place, after which the entire album was recorded in the period of a single week. This was necessary because there was no record deal as yet, and their managers at EG were financing the sessions themselves, paying £5,000 in recording fees. The album was produced by King Crimson's lyricist Peter Sinfield, who had recently left that band. In May 1972, a few weeks after the recording sessions, a contract was signed with Island Records and in June the album was released.

The band's penchant for glamour was showcased both in the lyrics and in the 1950s-style album cover. The photographer Karl Stoecker shot the cover, featuring model Kari-Ann Moller, who later married Chris Jagger, brother of Mick Jagger (a stylised portrait of Kari-Ann Moller also graces the cover of Mott the Hoople's 1974 album The Hoople). After Brexit, when Moller was stopped by immigration officials while traveling under her Norwegian passport, Jagger uploaded the Roxy Music cover in support of his wife's application to remain in the UK.

The album was dedicated to Susie, a drummer who auditioned for Roxy Music in the early days.

== Release ==
Roxy Music, particularly the album's LP incarnation, has been released in different packages over the years. The album's original cover, as issued in 1972 by Island Records, featured a gatefold sleeve picturing the band (including original bass guitarist Graham Simpson) in stage attire designed by Antony Price, and did not include the track "Virginia Plain". The album's original US release, in late 1972 on Warner Bros. Records' Reprise subsidiary, included "Virginia Plain", which had since been issued as a single in the UK. The original US release also featured a gatefold sleeve, but replaced Simpson's photo with that of Rik Kenton, who played bass on "Virginia Plain" following Simpson's departure from the group.

US distribution of Roxy Music was transferred from Reprise to their affiliated company Atco Records in 1976, and back to Reprise in the mid-1980s. LP editions of the album pressed in these timeframes were without the gatefold sleeve and band photographs, instead providing liner notes on the rear album cover.

The original LP release did not contain any singles. In July 1972, a few weeks after the contract was signed, Roxy Music recorded two more songs, "Virginia Plain" and "The Numberer", that were released as a single. It peaked at No. 4 in the UK Singles Chart and helped push sales of the album, which itself went to No. 10. In most later repressings of the album, including CD versions, the song "Virginia Plain" has been included.

Versions of all nine tracks of the UK album were recorded by the BBC for the John Peel show on 4 January and 23 May 1972, with the earlier session featuring David O'List on guitar.

== Critical reception ==
Retrospective professional ratings
Review scores
Source	Rating
AllMusic	5/5 stars
Christgau's Record Guide	B+
Mojo	5/5 stars
Pitchfork	8.9/10
Q	5/5 stars
Record Collector	4/5 stars
The Rolling Stone Album Guide	4/5 stars
Select	4/5
Spin Alternative Record Guide	8/10
Uncut	8/10

Reviewing for Creem in 1973, Robert Christgau said: "From the drag queen [sic] on the cover to the fop finery in the centerfold to the polished deformity of the music on the record, this celebrates the kind of artifice that could come to seem as unhealthy as the sheen on a piece of rotten meat. Right now, though, it's decorated with enough weird hooks to earn an A for side one. Side two leans a little too heavily on the synthesizer (played by a balding, long-haired eunuch lookalike named Eno) without the saving grace of drums and bassline."

Around the time of the release of Roxy Music's third album Stranded, Ferry was quoted as saying that he did not like the odd production of Roxy Music and was re-recording many of its tracks. Ferry eventually re-recorded "Re-Make/Re-Model", "2HB", "Chance Meeting" and "Sea Breezes", and released them as B-sides to some of his solo singles between 1973 and 1976, collecting them together on his 1976 solo album Let's Stick Together.

In 1994, Roxy Music was ranked number 57 in Colin Larkin's All Time Top 1000 Albums. He described the album as "totally original and a breath of bizarre air", noting that it "put Bryan Ferry and Eno at the forefront of the art-rock movement." In 2003, Rolling Stone included the album at number 62 in its list of the best debut albums of all time and stated: "In England in the early Seventies, there was nerdy art-rock and sexy glam-rock and rarely did the twain meet. Until this record, that is." Uncut placed it at number nine on its 2015 list of the best debut albums. In 2005, Q included Roxy Music at number 31 in a list of "40 Cosmic Rock Albums" published in its special issue Pink Floyd & the Story of Prog Rock. In 2012, Treble named it as one of 10 "essential" glam rock albums.

In 2024, the cover artwork was parodied by Linda Thompson for Proxy Music, an album of her songs performed by other singers.

== Track listing ==
=== Original UK release ===
All tracks are written by Bryan Ferry.

Side one
No.	Title	Length
1.	"Re-Make/Re-Model"	5:10
2.	"Ladytron"	4:21
3.	"If There Is Something"	6:33
4.	"2HB"	4:34

Side two
No.	Title	Length
1.	"The Bob (Medley)"	5:48
2.	"Chance Meeting"	3:00
3.	"Would You Believe?"	3:47
4.	"Sea Breezes"	7:00
5.	"Bitters End"	2:02

=== USA release ===
All tracks are written by Bryan Ferry.

Side one
No.	Title	Length
1.	"Re-Make/Re-Model"	5:10
2.	"Ladytron"	4:21
3.	"If There Is Something"	6:33
4.	"Virginia Plain"	2:57
5.	"2HB"	4:34

Side two
No.	Title	Length
1.	"The Bob (Medley)"	5:48
2.	"Chance Meeting"	3:00
3.	"Would You Believe?"	3:47
4.	"Sea Breezes"	7:00
5.	"Bitters End"	2:02

=== Super Deluxe Edition ===
In March 2018, a Super Deluxe 3CD + 1DVD "Book Set" of the debut album Roxy Music was released containing previously unheard material, original 1971 demos, the original album plus alternate takes, contemporary BBC Sessions and a DVD containing rare video footage and a 5.1 surround mix by Steven Wilson, along with a 136-page hardback book with an essay by Richard Williams, including many rare and unpublished photographs. All are within a heavy-duty slipcase. 'Disc One: Original Album'

No.	Title	Length
1.	"Re-Make/Re-Model"	5:14
2.	"Ladytron"	4:26
3.	"If There Is Something"	6:34
4.	"Virginia Plain"	2:58
5.	"2HB"	4:30
6.	"The Bob (Medley)"	5:48
7.	"Chance Meeting"	3:08
8.	"Would You Believe?"	3:53
9.	"Sea Breezes"	7:04
10.	"Bitters End"	2:08

'Disc Two: Demos & Out-takes'

Early Demos May: 71
No.	Title	Length
1.	"Ladytron"	5:21
2.	"2HB"	7:14
3.	"Chance Meeting"	4:22
4.	"The Bob (Medley)"	5:59

Album Out-takes (March 1972)
No.	Title	Length
5.	"Instrumental"	0:32
6.	"Re-Make/Re-Model"	8:13
7.	"Ladytron"	5:16
8.	"If There Is Something"	7:06
9.	"2HB"	4:43
10.	"The Bob (Medley)"	7:19
11.	"Would You Believe?"	3:05
12.	"Chance Meeting"	5:30
13.	"Sea Breezes"	2:38
14.	"Bitters End"	6:04
15.	"Virginia Plain"	3:35

'Disc Three: The BBC Sessions'

The Peel Sessions 4/1/72
No.	Title	Length
1.	"If There Is Something"	6:38
2.	"The Bob (Medley)"	5:50
3.	"Would You Believe?"	3:49
4.	"Sea Breezes"	8:18
5.	"Re-Make/Re-Model"	4:58

The Peel Sessions 23/5/72
No.	Title	Length
6.	"2HB"	3:46
7.	"Ladytron"	6:14
8.	"Chance Meeting"	3:00

The Peel Sessions 18/7/72
No.	Title	Length
9.	"Virginia Plain"	4:03

BBC in Concert 3/8/72
No.	Title	Length
10.	"The Bob (Medley)"	5:51
11.	"Sea Breezes"	7:11
12.	"Virginia Plain"	3:27
13.	"Chance Meeting"	5:51
14.	"Re-Make/Re-Model"	6:28

'Disc Four: DVD VIDEO CONTENT'

Royal College of Art, /6/72
No.	Title	Length
1.	"Re-Make/Re-Model"	4:59

Old Grey Whistle Test 20/6/72
No.	Title	Length
2.	"Ladytron"	6:03

Top Of The Pops 24/08/72
No.	Title	Length
3.	"Virginia Plain"	2:56

Full House 25/11/72
No.	Title	Length
4.	"Re-Make/Re-Model (start)"	1:05
5.	"Ladytron"	4:30

French TV, Bataclan, Paris, 26/11/72
No.	Title	Length
6.	"Would You Believe?"	3:49
7.	"If There Is Something"	5:25
8.	"Sea Breezes"	6:06
9.	"Virginia Plain"	3:52

5.1 Mix of the Album By Steve Wilson (5.1 DTS 96/24 And Dolby AC3 Sound) AUDIO ONLY
No.	Title	Length
10.	"Re-Make/Re-Model"	5:15
11.	"Ladytron"	4:32
12.	"If There Is Something"	6:40
13.	"2HB"	4:30
14.	"The Bob (Medley)"	5:48
15.	"Chance Meeting"	3:18
16.	"Would You Believe?"	3:54
17.	"Sea Breezes"	7:04
18.	"Bitters End"	2:03
19.	"Virginia Plain"	3:01

== Personnel (original album) ==
Roxy Music

- Bryan Ferry – vocals, piano, Hohner Pianet, Mellotron
- Andy Mackay – oboe, saxophone, backing vocals
- Phil Manzanera – electric guitar
- Paul Thompson – drums
- Brian Eno – VCS3 synthesiser, tape effects, backing vocals
- Graham Simpson – bass guitar
- Rik Kenton – bass guitar on "Virginia Plain" (added to the album's North American release)

Production

- Roxy Music – arrangement
- Peter Sinfield – production
- Andy Hendriksen – engineering, mixing

== Personnel (40th anniversary deluxe reissue) ==
Roxy Music

- Bryan Ferry – vocals, piano, Hohner Pianet, Mellotron
- Andy Mackay – oboe, saxophone, backing vocals
- Phil Manzanera – electric guitar
- Paul Thompson – drums
- Brian Eno – VCS3 synthesizer, tape effects, backing vocals
- Graham Simpson – bass guitar (CD1: All except Track 4, CD2: Tracks 1–14, CD3: Tracks 1–5, DVD 5.1 Mix: All except Track 4)
- Rik Kenton – bass guitar (CD1: Track 4, CD2: Track 15, CD3: Tracks 9–14, DVD: All videos, 5.1 Mix: Track 4)
- Roger Bunn – electric guitar (CD2: Tracks 1–4)
- Dexter Lloyd – drums (CD2: Tracks 1–4)
- David O'List – electric guitar (CD3: Tracks 1–5)

Additional musician

- Peter Paul – bass guitar (CD3: Tracks 6–8)

Production

- Roxy Music – arrangement
- Peter Sinfield – production
- Andy Hendriksen – engineering, mixing

== Charts ==
Chart (1972)	Peak position
Australian Albums (Kent Music Report)	49
Japanese Albums (Oricon)	58
Norwegian Albums (VG-lista)	23
UK Albums (Official Charts)	10

Chart (2018)	Peak position
Belgian Albums (Ultratop Flanders)	80
Belgian Albums (Ultratop Wallonia)	152
Dutch Albums (Album Top 100)	89
Scottish Albums (Official Charts)	16

== Certifications ==
Region	Certification	Certified units/sales
United Kingdom (BPI)	Gold	100,000^{^}
^{^} Shipments figures based on certification alone.

== Tributes ==
In 2024 Linda Thompson released the album Proxy Music featuring a photograph of herself in a white dress on the cover in homage to the Roxy Music album. The title refers to Thompson's enlistment of proxies to record the album's vocals due to her spasmodic dysphonia that took away her ability to speak or sing.
