= Flashbacks of a Fool =

- Theatrical release poster
- Directed by: Baillie Walsh
- Written by: Baillie Walsh
- Produced by: Lene Bausager
- Starring: Daniel Craig; Harry Eden; Eve; Jodhi May; Helen McCrory; Mark Strong; Olivia Williams; James D'Arcy; Claire Forlani; Emilia Fox; Keeley Hawes
- Cinematography: John Mathieson
- Edited by: Struan Clay
- Music by: Richard Hartley
- Production companies: Left Turn Films; Ugly Duckling Films; Visitor Pictures
- Distributed by: Walt Disney Studios Motion Pictures (Note: Distributed by Walt Disney Studios Motion Pictures through Miramax Films.)
- Release date: 13 April 2008
- Running time: 114 minutes
- Country: United Kingdom
- Language: English
- Box office: $1.1 million

Flashbacks of a Fool is a 2008 British drama film about a Hollywood actor who, following the death of his childhood best friend, reflects upon his life and what might have been, had he stayed in England. The film was directed by Baillie Walsh, and stars Daniel Craig, Harry Eden, Claire Forlani, Felicity Jones, Emilia Fox, Eve, Jodhi May, Helen McCrory and Miriam Karlin.

== Plot ==
Joe Scot is a British actor living in Los Angeles whose once successful Hollywood career is flagging. He spends most of his time drinking, taking drugs, and having one-night stands. The only person he has in his life is personal assistant Ophelia who is growing tired of his antics.

One day, Joe receives a call that his childhood best friend Boots McKay has died unexpectedly. Shaken by the news and following a disastrous meeting with an up-and-coming director and his agent, Joe swims out to sea, contemplating suicide. In a flashback set in the 1970s, a teenage Joe lives with his mother, aunt and younger sister Jesse in a small town on the English coast. Joe frequently shows support to Boots, who is struggling with epilepsy following an attack at the local cinema.

Meanwhile, Evelyn Adams, a sexually frustrated housewife and next-door neighbor, attempts to seduce Joe by kissing him before they are interrupted. When he visits her later, she attempts to seduce him again by kissing him and removes his trousers, but her husband returns home before they can go any further. Joe soon forms a relationship with Ruth, a popular but quirky girl his own age. She invites him back to her parents' house and he accepts, leaving Boots alone and angry. Joe is impressed by Ruth's affluent lifestyle and record collection while bonding over If There Is Something by Roxy Music. Ruth later asks him out on a date.

The following day, Evelyn asks Joe to come into her house as he’s on his way to meet Ruth: unable to resist, he has sex with her. He arrives late to meet her, who has been kept company by Boots. However, Ruth sees love bites on Joe's neck and storms off, leading to a fight between Boots and Joe. The next day, Evelyn continues her affair with a more reluctant Joe. She forces her daughter Jane out to play so they can have the house to themselves. While they have sex, Jane finds a washed-up sea mine and climbs on it, killing her instantly. Joe blames himself for the recent events and runs away on the day of Jane's funeral, never to return.

Back in the present, Joe returns to England and arrives late to attend Boots' funeral. His mother and aunt tell him that Boots married Ruth and that he died of an aneurysm, leaving behind four young children and a lot of debt. Jesse takes Joe to the church graveyard to meet Ruth, who tells him how much she loved Boots. Joe also spots graves belonging to Jane and Evelyn. He learns from Jesse that Evelyn's marriage broke down after Jane died and she married a man who physically abused her. Evelyn later found the courage to leave but was killed in a car accident.

Joe later goes back to the house he purchased for his family when his career was going well. He listens to the same music he and Ruth listened to on the night they first met and decides to write her a cheque to clear the debt. He encloses with the cheque a letter, containing the lyrics to If There is Something. When Jesse gives it to her, Ruth initially refuses but finds the lyrics and breaks down crying. Brought down to earth by Boots' death and Ruth's grief, Joe returns to Los Angeles where he is met by Ophelia and hopes to start his career afresh.

== Cast ==
- Daniel Craig as Joe Scot
  - Harry Eden as young Joe Scot
- Claire Forlani as Ruth
  - Felicity Jones as young Ruth
- Emilia Fox as Sister Jean
- Eve as Ophelia Franklin
- Jodhi May as Evelyn Adams
- Miriam Karlin as Mrs. Rogers
- Helen McCrory as Peggy Tickell
- James D'Arcy as Jack Adams
- Mark Strong as Mannie Miesel
- Olivia Williams as Grace Scot
- Julie Ordon as Carrie Ann
- Gina Athans as Apple
- Max Deacon as Boots McKay
- Jodie Tomlinson as Jane Adams
- Keeley Hawes as Jesse Scot
  - Mia Clifford as young Jesse Scot

== Production ==
The film was mainly shot in Cape Town in South Africa, and England. Flashbacks of a Fool was director Baillie Walsh's first feature film. Walsh had directed music videos for, among others, Massive Attack, Oasis and INXS. The cinematography for the film was done by John Mathieson, who shot for films such as Gladiator, Matchstick Men and Kingdom of Heaven.

== Reception ==
Review aggregator Rotten Tomatoes reports a 41% approval rating based on 22 reviews. The site's critics consensus reads: "Despite Daniel Craig's earnest efforts, Flashbacks of a Fool suffers from an ambitious but underdeveloped script".
