= Ladytron (song) =

Song by Roxy Music

from the album Roxy Music
- Released: 16 June 1972
- Recorded: Command Studios, London 15 March 1972
- Genre: Art rock, glam rock
- Length: 4:26
- Label: E.G. Records
- Songwriter: Bryan Ferry
- Producer: Peter Sinfield

"Ladytron" is a song by Bryan Ferry, recorded by his band Roxy Music and appearing on their debut album. The British electronic band Ladytron took their name from this song.

The song has distinctive instrumentation, including an oboe solo, liberal use of the mellotron's famous "three violins" tape set, and much processing of the other instruments by Brian Eno via his VCS3 synthesizer and tape echo. The sound in the start of the song was created by Brian Eno, after Bryan Ferry asked him to produce something reminiscent of the Lunar Landing.

Lyrically, it presents Ferry as a Casanova-style seducer of women, whilst being simultaneously enraptured by them. Another interpretation is that the Ladytron is a female robot (hence the name), being seduced by Ferry.

In 2006, The Times described "Ladytron" as one of Roxy Music's "best loved songs."

The haunting oboe melody heard in the intro is reminiscent of a passage in the first movement of Sergei Prokofiev's Piano Concerto No. 3 in C, Op. 26.

== Personnel ==
- Bryan Ferry – Hohner Pianet electric piano, Mellotron, vocals
- Andy MacKay – oboe, saxophone
- Brian Eno – VCS3 synthesiser, tape effects
- Graham Simpson – bass guitar
- Paul Thompson – drums
- Phil Manzanera – electric guitar
