= Paul Korda =

English songwriter, singer, musician, and actor (1948–2020)

- Born: Paul Kunstler; 1948; Singapore
- Died: 11 March 2020 (aged 72)
- Genres: Rock; pop; soul
- Occupations: Musician; songwriter; record producer; arranger; actor
- Instruments: Guitar; piano; vocals
- Years active: 1965–2020
- Formerly of: Original cast of Hair, Dada, Elkie Brooks, Love Sculpture, Teddy Brown, Frankie Valli, Roger Daltrey
- Website: paulkorda.com

Paul Korda (born Paul Kunstler, 1948 – 11 March 2020) was an English songwriter, singer, musician, and actor. He wrote and performed music from the 1960s onwards, and his songs have been covered by artists such as Roger Daltrey, Dave Edmunds, Frankie Valli, and Love Sculpture.

== Family background ==
Korda was born in Singapore, into a creative family of entertainers, professional singers, songwriters, and accomplished musicians. His father, Hungarian-born Tibor Kunstler, was a violinist and former student of the Franz Liszt Conservatory of Music in Budapest, Hungary and Academia La Scala in Milan, Italy. Tibor played saxophone on Coleman Hawkins' tour of the East. Korda's British mother, Shirley Green — who worked under the stage name Shirley Lenner — was a vocalist and actress. She starred in Those Kids From Town (1942) and also sang with Joe Loss, George Elrick, and Stéphane Grappelli.

Kunstler and Green met while working as entertainers in Singapore. Kunstler, who had been interned during the Japanese invasion of Java while playing at the Hilton Hotel there, was performing at Raffles Hotel while Green, who had spent the latter part of World War II entertaining British troops, was singing at Princes Restaurant nearby.

Korda's British grandparents had also been professional singers, songwriters and musicians. In the 1890s, his grandmother Florence Wright worked in a market stall in Edinburgh, Scotland, singing songs penned by Lawrence Wright to help sell his sheet music. Wright and her husband, pianist Tommy Lenner, took their thirteen children on tour with them as angels at the beginning of the Vaudeville era.

Shirley Lenner's sisters were well known singers in Britain: Judy Shirley hosted Monday Night at Seven for the BBC during World War II, and Anne Lenner sang with American composer Carole Gibbons.

== Formative years ==
Due to his parents' work commitments and divorce, Korda was sent to boarding school at age five and a half upon returning to England. He continued to be away at school for much of his childhood. He took classical piano lessons, prompted by his father's classical education, while his mother arranged for him to take lessons from a contemporary piano player. At the age of nine wrote his first musical.

At thirteen Korda won a scholarship to Victoria College on the Isle of Jersey in the Channel Islands. It was on Jersey that he joined The Intruders, a local band, even though boarders were forbidden to go to nightclubs, and began writing songs.

Korda applied for a place at Harrow Technical College, near London, to study photography at age fifteen. He was accepted at the college, based not on his academic results, but on the quality of his photographs. While studying photography, Korda ran Harrow Technical College's Folk Club, and was spotted by the manager of Bluesology, a band formed by Elton John and Rod Stewart. The manager soon took Korda to meet Beatles publisher Stephen James and introduced him to Elton John (still called Reg Dwight).

== Early career: songwriting and production ==
Korda's first record, "Go on Home", was released on EMI's Columbia label when he was seventeen. At this point in his early career Korda began playing the Soho folk club, Les Cousins, alongside other friends, Sandy Denny and Cat Stevens. Cat Stevens and Korda became close friends and in between recording sessions would often check out the London nightlife together.

In 1967 Korda was signed as a songwriter to Rolling Stones producer Andrew Loog Oldham's Immediate Records publishing company and went on to write for P.P. Arnold for her single "The Time Has Come". The song made the UK charts, and the Italian version "Se Perdo Te", recorded by Patty Pravo, reached No. 18 in Italy. Korda, like so many Immediate artists, wasn't paid, and, being a minor, repudiated his contract after the managing director took Korda's new 12-string guitar and gave it to another songwriter.

That same year Korda formed his first professional band and gave his opening night at the 7 1/2 Club in London to Jimi Hendrix so that Hendrix could showcase to the English music business. Hendrix expressed his gratitude for the chance and referred to the Afro-wearing Korda as his "soul brother".

After suffering the shock of his mother's accidental death, he was offered a production job by EMI Records and produced Jon Anderson's first recordings Korda's production rhythm section included Ronnie Lane, Ian McLagan, and Kenney Jones on drums.

== Hair ==
Korda signed young American singer Andy Forray and took him to auditions for the musical Hair: The American Tribal Love/Rock Musical in London. Forray was hired, as was Korda, who was also asked to audition and offered the part of Paul. The musical opened at the Shaftesbury Theatre in London on 27 September 1968 and continued for 1,998 performances. The run at the Shaftesbury ended when the theatre's roof collapsed in July 1973.

== Solo career ==
After leaving the cast of Hair, Korda was drawn to activism, starting early in his career with the ecological protest song "Seagull (The West Coast Oil Tragedy)", which he recorded for Parlophone Records (EMI) that was then covered by Love Sculpture. Korda then focused on local social issues, in particular the plight of Britain's Old Age Pensioners, who were struggling to survive on their government pensions. He penned "Give Us the Right to Live", rehearsed, and recorded the song with twenty pensioners, the eldest of whom was over 80 years old. When the song was released by Famous Records, Korda and the pensioners opened the Trade Union Congress at London's Royal Albert Hall.

Soon after bringing public attention to the pensioners' issue, Korda formed, sang for, and wrote songs for the British rock-fusion band Dada, in which he shared vocals with Elkie Brooks and Jimmy Chambers on their only album, Dada, for Atlantic Records in 1970. Due to factionalism Korda quit the band and was replaced by Robert Palmer.

Korda then decided to go solo and formed a band to play at the Speakeasy Club. This core of musicians—who went on to play on Korda's debut album, Passing Stranger (released 1971 on MAM Records)—consisted of Onnie McIntyre and Allan Gorrie and guitarists Chris Spedding and Andy Roberts. Passing Stranger also featured a trio of vocalists in African-American soul singer Doris Troy, Nanette Newman, and Madeline Bell.

Cat Stevens and Korda became close friends, both being signed to producer Mike Hurst. Steve (Steven Adam Georgiou), as he was known then, loaned his Mercedes to Korda for Korda's wedding, and his brother David was Korda's best man. In between recording sessions Steve and Korda would often check out the London nightlife together.

Korda went on to place his songs with other artists. In 1971 Korda's song "Walk the World Away" was recorded by reggae artist Teddy Brown. The French version "L'Amour C'est Ca, L'Amour C'est Toi" coupled with "C'est Ma Priere" was recorded by Mike Brant and remained at No. 1 in France for six months.

In 1974 Korda wrote, sang, and played piano on three songs ("Feeling", "Hearts Right", and "World Over") for Roger Daltrey's second solo album Ride a Rock Horse (1975), which reached the Top 20 in the US and UK. Korda's collaboration with Daltrey continued two years later when he wrote and played piano on "Written on the Wind" (#46 in the UK) for Daltrey's 1977 solo album One of the Boys. In an effort to reach a wider audience, Korda flew to New York City to look for work. Along with Daryl Pettiford and Nic Potter (whom Korda flew over from Britain) he performed a week-long engagement at The Other End and was written up in Variety. He moved his family to Los Angeles in 1977, where he recorded his second solo album Dancing in the Aisles, co-produced by Spencer Davis for Janus Records, and recorded at the Village Recorder. Dancing in the Aisles reached No. 4 in Billboard magazine's National Radio Adds chart the week following its release, due in large part to heavy airplay of "Manhattan" in New York. Korda then performed at Los Angeles' Roxy Theatre with a 12-piece band, and Bruce Springsteen, who came to the show, displayed his enthusiasm by dancing in the audience during the set. Before promotion of the album could be completed, Janus Records filed for bankruptcy.

To overcome the problem of losing his record deal to corporate bankruptcy, Korda came up with "Out of Gas", that was rush-released by RCA Records, at the beginning of the gas shortages in the US. The song was later featured in the documentary series The History of America, presented by Ted Koppel.

Korda's keyboard player David Kaffinetti and drummer R.J. Parnell were chosen as band members for Rob Reiner's cult classic This Is Spinal Tap, which led to Korda making a brief appearance as a rockstar/partygoer in the film.

In the early 1980s, Korda opened the Central Jam Night, during which musicians such as Phil Collins and Mitch Mitchell joined him onstage. He performed with guitarists John Goodsall and Mike Miller, keyboardist J. Peter Robinson, drummers Steve Chapman, Ric Parnell and keyboardists David Kaf, Merry Stewart and bass player Lou Castro, and percussionist Malando Gassama.

In the mid-1980s, Korda recorded an unreleased album with producer Dave Jerdan. He also received first prize at the Japan Expo for his space song "Living in the Sky", subsequently recorded with fusion guitar virtuoso Allan Holdsworth. Korda went on to sing background vocals on Holdsworth's 1985 album Road Games, and co-wrote and sang "In the Mystery" for Holdsworth's follow-up indie album Metal Fatigue. Written and recorded in 24 hours, it was released and being played on KROQ-FM three weeks later.

In 1988 Korda returned to London, where he opened a club in Highgate Village. Korda booked his friend, British guitarist Snowy White, as headliner, and formed the support band with Malcolm Duncan on saxophone, Nic Potter on bass, and some singers from Eurythmics. Shortly afterward Korda supported White at one of the last shows at the original Marquee Club in London.

Korda went on to Orlando, Florida, where he opened Major Music Records. Finding there were "too many sharks on land there," he returned to Los Angeles in the early 1990s and wrote and arranged "Run for Your Life" for Frankie Valli and the Four Seasons' Hope and Glory album.

In 1994, shortly after obtaining custody of his sons, Korda dedicated his time and energy to volunteering to help low-income inner city children. He began teaching music to children at a community center in East Los Angeles, encouraging them to develop an outlet for their frustrations through spontaneous musical creativity. To promote the cause, Korda began working with the choir of his sons' former school, the 32nd Street / USC Magnet School for the Performing Arts. They recorded "Beyond the Darkness", hoping to raise money through sales of the CD to finance music education. The project was aided by A&M Records founder Herb Alpert, who arranged for the recording to be produced at A&M Studio A in Hollywood. J. Peter Robinson arranged the music and Linda Yellan directed the video for the song, with the children in charge of wardrobe, make up and acting. Due to the lack of high-profile rock stars involved, and royalties going to the Los Angeles School Districts Magnet Program, promotion was limited by the lack of business interest.

Korda was personally affected by the events of 9/11, because he had turned down a reservation on the doomed flight out of Boston that morning, returning from London on 10 September, choosing an earlier direct flight to Los Angeles instead. He witnessed the 9/11 events the next morning and decided to drive to Vancouver Island Canada, to collect his thoughts. While staying in Vancouver, he began developing the concept of a musical, Coming To, a kind of modern-day Hair, about the country's psychological aftermath in the months following 9/11 and the collective need for awakening. He also composed many of the songs for his next album Not for Robots.

Shortly after recording Not for Robots, Korda went to work as the governor's dignitary in the movie Pirates of the Caribbean: The Curse of the Black Pearl, for the first two weeks of production. On the last day of filming Korda came up with the idea for his song, "Pirates of the Caribbean". Korda added the song as a bonus track on Not for Robots. In August 2003 the song reached No. 1 in the UK MP3 Europop chart and No. 6 in the UK MP3 Pop chart, for internet downloads.

In 2003 Korda worked with Peter Mullen and John C. Riley on the Criminal. In 2004 he played a museum director in the movie After the Sunset. His last movie appearances were as Pierre Fuquette in The Pink Panther and another turn as Governor Swann's dignitary in Pirates of the Caribbean: Dead Man's Chest. He also appeared in My Name is Earl.

== Death ==
Korda died on 11 March 2020, aged 72.

== Discography ==
=== 7-inch singles ===
- "Go on Home" (Korda)/"Just Come Closer to me" (Korda-Spyropolous), Columbia DB7994 Paul Korda, 1966. Production: Mike Smith
- "Smile If You Want To" (Korda-Andrews) "Making Love to Him" (Korda-Andrews) Tim Andrews & Paul Korda, Parlophone R5714, 1968. Production: Paul Korda.
- "Angel Face" (Korda-Andrews)/"Waiter Get Me A Drink" (Korda-Andrews) Tim Andrews & Paul Korda, Parlophone R5746, 1968. Production: Paul Korda.
- "How Many More Hearts Must Be Broken" (Korda-Andrews) "Discovery" (Korda-Andrews) Tim Andrews & Paul Korda, Parlophone R 5769, 1969. Production: Paul Korda
- "Seagull (the West coast oil tragedy)" (Korda) "Night of the Next Day" (Korda) Paul Korda, Parlophone R5778, 1970. Production: Paul Korda.
- "Between the Road" (Korda)/"English Country Garden" (Korda) Paul Korda, MAM1971, 1971. Production: Paul Korda & Vic Smith.
- "More Than A Friend" (Korda)/"Alone Together" (Korda) Paul Korda, Janus 277, 1979. Production: Spencer Davis & Paul Korda.
- "Out of Gas" (Korda)/"To be Born Again" (Korda) Paul Korda, RCA 11645. Production: Paul Korda.
- "Pirates of the Caribbean" mp3, 2003.

=== Albums/CDs ===
- Hair Original London Cast LP, Decca Records, 1968. (Paul Korda: Main Performer-Vocals)
- Dada Atlantic Records, 1970. (Korda: Vocals)
- Passing Stranger Paul Korda MAM Records (Paul Korda: Main Performer, Songs, Vocals). Produced by Paul Korda & Vic Smith.
- Dancing in the Aisles Paul Korda Janus Records, 1979. (Paul Korda: Main Performer, Vocals). Producers: Spencer Davis & Paul Korda.
- Beyond the Darkness Paul Korda & the 32ndStreet / USC Children's Choir, 1994, (Paul Korda: Vocal)
- Holiday greetings CD to benefit the Magnet School program for the Performing arts. Production: Paul Korda
- Not for Robots Paul Korda, OnLineRecordWorld.com, 2003 (Paul Korda: songwriting, instruments, production, album artwork).
- Seeds Paul Korda, 2008, (Paul Korda: songwriter, arrangements, keyboards, vocals, artwork)
- Early Years Paul Korda, 2009, (Paul Korda: songs, arrangements, keyboards, vocals).
- In the Key of See Paul Korda, 2009, (Paul Korda: piano, keyboards, vocals).

== Bibliography ==
- Wollman, Elizabeth Lara. The Theater Will Rock: A History of the Rock Musical, from Hair to Hedwig, Ann Arbor: University of Michigan, 2009 ISBN 978-0-472-03402-4
