= Gina Athans =

South African model

- Born: 7 June 1984 (age 41); Johannesburg, South Africa
- Spouse: Eyhab Jumean (m. 2004–2005)
- Modeling information
- Height: 1.81 m (5 ft 11 in)

Gina Athans (born 7 June 1984) is a South African former beauty queen and model of Greek origin.

Born in Johannesburg, her father is a doctor and her mother a businesswoman. She was raised on a small holding in Eikenhof, (Note: Eikenhof, Gauteng 26.3438°S 27.9927°E) south of Johannesburg.

Crowned Miss South Africa Teen 2000 aged 17, she then signed for IMG Models and moved to Paris. Developing her modelling career, she was the first South African model to appear in Marie Claire, and has been voted FHM sexiest woman in the world and South Africa's most Stylish Woman. She had a small part in the Daniel Craig film Flashbacks of a Fool (2008).

She also opened her own PR Firm, Gina Athans PR in 2009, which was hired to provide a PR make-over for Saif al-Islam Gaddafi before the 2011 Libyan Civil War. She further assisted on PR campaigns for various heads of States of Africa. She is also known for her support of charitable causes. She is a business woman in her own right. She founded Holanathi in 2018, and the business has become a great success. She is recognized as one of the most influential women in Africa, regarding advocacy around malnutrition and ending hunger. Through her business endeavors, she has made nutrition accessible to millions of children.

She married Jordanian billionaire businessman Eyhab Jumean in 2004 in a wedding attended by 1,000 guests, including 50 Cent and Dannii Minogue. The couple separated within a year, and later divorced. Since 2008 she has lived in and has been based Cape Town but also has a home in Johannesburg.
