= William Naylor =

Film producer

- Occupation: Film producer

William Naylor is the producer of several music series for the BBC:

- Dancing in the Street, about rock and roll (1996)
- Walk On By, about pop music (2001)
- Lost Highway: The History of American Country, about country music (2003)
- Soul Deep, about rhythm and blues (2005)
- Seven Ages of Rock, about rock music (2007)
