= Andy Pratt (singer-songwriter) =

American rock music singer-songwriter and multi-instrumentalist

- Born: January 25, 1947 (age 79); Boston, Massachusetts, U.S.
- Genres: Rock; soft rock; folk rock; experimental; religious
- Occupations: Musician; singer; songwriter; composer
- Instruments: Vocals; guitars; bass guitar; piano; accordion; sitar; tabla; clavinet
- Years active: 1969–present
- Labels: Polydor; Epic; Columbia; Nemperor; Atlantic; Aztec; Enzone; GMI; Spark Music; ItsAboutMusic.com

Andy Pratt (born January 25, 1947) is an American rock singer, songwriter and multi-instrumentalist. In the 1970s, he made a number of experimental records, of which "Avenging Annie" was a commercial hit.

== Career ==
Pratt's demo recording of Avenging Annie was given to the Brown University radio station WBRU in 1972. In early 1973, Pratt signed to Columbia Records by Clive Davis. He went into Aengus Studios, of Fayville, Massachusetts and released Andy Pratt in 1973, which had modest commercial success. The single, "Avenging Annie", peaked at #78 on the Billboard Hot 100, and at #69 on the Cash Box Top 100. The song was re-recorded by the Who's lead vocalist Roger Daltrey for his third solo studio album One of the Boys (1977). Pratt's original version of the single became the B-side of Bruce Springsteen's "Blinded by the Light" on a CBS promotional disc, and was used on the soundtrack to the musical drama film Velvet Goldmine (1998).

Rolling Stone magazine said of Pratt's third studio album, Resolution (1976), "The songs carry rock harmony one step beyond the Beach Boys and the [Rolling] Stones." In 1982 Pratt released the mini-LP Fun in the First World produced by Leroy Radcliffe and released on Boston's Enzone Records. The mini-LP was later included on The Age of Goodbye (2004).

== Discography ==
- Records Are Like Life (Polydor Records, 1969, reissued 1971)
- Andy Pratt (Columbia Records, 1973)
- Resolution (Nemperor Records, distributed by Atlantic Records, 1976)
- Shiver in the Night (Nemperor, 1977)
- Motives (Nemperor, distributed by Epic Records, 1979)
- Fun in the First World (Enzone Records, 1982)
- Not Just for Dancing (Lamborghini Records, 1983)
- Perfect Therapy (GMI, 1986)
- Life (GMI, 1988)
- One Body (GMI, 1991)
- Fire of Love (GMI, 1993)
- Resolution: The Andy Pratt Collection (Razor & Tie Records, compilation, 1996)
- Another World (Highway Records, 1998)
- Heaven and Earth (itsaboutmusic.com, 2003)
- I'm All Right (itsaboutmusic.com, 2003)
- Cover Me (itsaboutmusic.com, February 2003)
- New Resolutions (itsaboutmusic.com, August 2003)
- Andy Pratt Is Back (itsaboutmusic.com, 2003)
- Andy Pratt Solo (itsaboutmusic.com, 2003)
- Live : Recorded Live at The Village Underground, NYC 3/11/03 (itsaboutmusic.com, 2003)
- Age of Goodbye (Fun in the First World + Not Just for Dancing +2, CoraZong Records, 2004)
- Runaway Heart (itsaboutmusic.com, 2006)
- Masters of War (itsaboutmusic.com, 2008)
- Andy Pratt Loves You (Forward motion records, 2010)
- Life and Death (Forward motion records, 2011)
- Chasing Shadows (Forward motion records, 2013)
- The Wolf (independent, 2013)
- The New Normal? (Forward motion records, 2014)
- Do You Remember Me? (Continental Record Services, 2015)
