= Andy Pratt (album) =

Studio album by Andy Pratt
- Released: 1973
- Recorded: Boston, 1973
- Genre: Soft rock; folk-rock; experimental
- Length: 40:00
- Label: Columbia
- Producer: John Nagy

Andy Pratt chronology
Records Are Like Life (1969)	Andy Pratt (1973)	Resolution (1976)

Professional ratings
Review scores
Source	Rating
AllMusic	4.5/5 stars
Christgau's Record Guide	C
Rolling Stone	(favorable)

Andy Pratt is the second studio album by American singer-songwriter Andy Pratt, released in 1973 by Columbia Records. It was Pratt's first album of entirely new music since his debut Records Are Like Life in 1969.

On release, Pratt received a positive critical reception, but had only modest commercial success. The only single issued from Andy Pratt: "Avenging Annie" was also a moderate success, peaking at number 78 in the US.

== Critical reception ==
In 1973, the album was ranked No. 3 on Dutch Muziekkrant OOR's list of best albums of 1973. And Al Kooper listed the album at No. 58 on his list of 100 Greatest Recordings of All Time.

The album has consistently been praised by critics. Reviewing the album in his consumer guide for The Village Voice, Robert Christgau gave the album a C and highly praised the track "Avenging Annie" commenting that it "is an astounding tale of feminist revenge in the twilight of the counterculture." but didn't comment on any of the other tracks on the album.

In a retrospective review for AllMusic, critic Michael Ofjord gave the album four and a half out of five stars and wrote that "Andy Pratt's self-titled album is a very quirky, idiosyncratic album that definitely establishes Pratt as a major force in the singer-songwriter arena." while also praising "Avenging Annie" commenting that "The fast piano technique is impressive, as are some other production touches (such as the cat sounds and descending guitar line). The song deserves its classic status hands down."

== Track listing ==
All tracks are written by Andy Pratt, except where noted.

Side one
No.	Title	Writer(s)	Length
1.	"Avenging Annie"		5:08
2.	"Inside Me Wants Out"		3:13
3.	"It's All Behind You"	Nick Koumoutseas; Andy Pratt	3:46
4.	"Summer, Summer"		3:34
5.	"Call Up That Old Friend"		3:10

Side two
No.	Title	Length
6.	"Give It All to Music"	3:28
7.	"Who Am I Talking To"	3:13
8.	"All the King's Weight"	4:07
9.	"So Fine (It's Frightening)"	2:37
10.	"Sittin' Down in the Twilight"	3:39
11.	"Deer Song"	4:05
Total length:		40:00

== Personnel ==
Credits are adapted from the album's liner notes.

- Andy Pratt – lead and background vocals; guitars; bass guitars; piano; accordion; sitar; tabla; clavinet
- John Nagy – guitars; mandolin; mandola; mandocello
- Gary Anderson – flute; baritone and tenor saxophones
- Anastasios Karatza – electric guitars, hi-hat
- Jim Thompson – electric guitars
- Jesse Henderson – drums
- Abraham Laboriel – bass guitars
- Bill Elliot – organ
- Nick Koumoutseas – backing vocals

Additional musicians

- Roger Hock – trombone
- Bob McCarthy – acoustic guitar on "Call Up That Old Friend"
- John Payne – clarinet
- Juma Santos – congas
- Rick Shlosser – bongos

== Chart performance ==
=== Peak position ===
Chart	Peak Position
U.S. Billboard 200 Chart	192

== Covers ==
- The song "Avenging Annie" was covered by the Who's lead vocalist Roger Daltrey, for his third solo studio album One of the Boys. Daltrey also released his version of the track as a single 1977. Notably, his version changed the lyrics from 1st person to 3rd.
