= Graham Simpson (musician) =

English musician (1943–2012)

- Born: 13 October 1943; Manchester, England
- Died: 17 April 2012 (aged 68) London, England
- Genres: Glam rock; art rock; blues; jazz
- Occupation: Musician
- Instrument: Bass
- Formerly of: The Gas Board; Roxy Music

Graham Simpson (13 October 1943 – 17 April 2012) was an English musician. He was a founding member and bassist of Roxy Music. On their first album (1972), his bass notes made distinctive contributions to the tracks "Ladytron" and "Chance Meeting". However, around the time of the album's release, Simpson, who was suffering from depression following the death of his mother from cancer, was given an open-ended choice to remain with or take a hiatus from the band by Ferry. Simpson chose to leave the band and never returned to the line-up. He used his band royalties to travel the world learning about different cultures and religions, particularly Sufism, returning to London in 1982.

Simpson is the subject of a short film called Nothing But the Magnificent that was screened at the Portobello Film Festival in 2010. The feature-length version called Mighty was nine years in the making and due to star Hollywood film director Mike Figgis and original members of Roxy Music including Bryan Ferry. Directed by West London filmmaker Miranda Little, Mighty features original material of Simpson by his former neighbour Sara Cook – an enigmatic London artist who also discovered him.

He died in Ladbroke Grove, London, in April 2012.

Roxy Music were inducted into the Rock and Roll Hall of Fame in March 2019, with Simpson named as an original band member.
