= List of UK Dance Singles Chart number ones of 1987 =

This is a list of the songs that were number one on the UK Dance Singles Chart in 1987, according to the MRIB.

Issue date	Song	Artist	Duration
3 January	"Mr Big Stuff"	Heavy D	1 Week
10 January	"Jack Your Body"	Steve "Silk" Hurley	6 weeks
21 February	"I Knew You Were Waiting (For Me)"	George Michael & Aretha Franklin	1 week
28 February	"Stand by Me"	Ben E. King	6 weeks
25 April	"Living in a Box"	Living in a Box	2 weeks
9 May	"Back and Forth"	Cameo	1 week
16 May	"Cross the Track"	Maceo and the Macks	1 week
23 May	"I Wanna Dance With Somebody"	Whitney Houston	4 weeks
20 June	"Lifetime Love"	Joyce Sims	2 weeks
4 July	"Wishing Well"	Terence Trent D'Arby	1 week
11 July	"Always"	Atlantic Starr	1 week
18 July	"Who's That Girl"	Madonna	3 weeks
8 August	"Roadblock"	Stock Aitken Waterman	2 weeks
22 August	"Never Gonna Give You Up"	Rick Astley	3 weeks
12 September	"Pump Up the Volume"	M/A/R/R/S	6 weeks
24 October	"The Real Thing"	Jellybean ft. Steven Dante	1 week
31 October	"I Don't Think Man Should Sleep Alone"	Ray Parker Jr.	1 week
7 November	"Paid In Full"	Eric B. & Rakim	3 weeks
28 November	"Criticize"	Alexander O'Neal	3 weeks
19 December	"The Way You Make Me Feel"	Michael Jackson	4 Weeks
