= Just Visiting This Planet =

1987 studio album by Jellybean

Studio album by Jellybean
- Released: 1987 (original); 2012 (remastered and expanded)
- Studios: Z Studios (New York City); Hit Factory (New York City); Right Track (New York City); Sigma Sound (New York City); Sound Track (New York City); Summa Music Group (Los Angeles); A&M (Hollywood); Larrabee (Los Angeles)
- Label: Chrysalis
- Producer: Jellybean

Jellybean chronology
Wotupski!?! (1984)	Just Visiting This Planet (1987)	Jellybean Rocks the House! (1988)

Just Visiting This Planet is the second album by Jellybean, the nickname for American producer, remixer and songwriter John Benitez. The album was released in 1987 and contains the singles "Who Found Who", "The Real Thing", "Jingo" and "Just a Mirage".

In 2012, the album was remastered and expanded by Cherry Red Records. It features five remixes, including a remix of the song "Sidewalk Talk", the original version being released as a single in 1985 and was not included on the original album. "Sidewalk Talk" was written by Madonna, who also provides backing vocals.

== Critical reception ==
Professional ratings
Review scores
Source	Rating
AllMusic	2/5 stars
The Encyclopedia of Popular Music	3/5 stars
The Rolling Stone Album Guide	3/5 stars
Smash Hits	6.5/10

Reviewing the reissue, Record Collector wrote that while "the synth stabs, LinnDrum gloops and crashing beats sometimes date the set, tracks such as 'Walking In My Sleep' [are] quintessential exercises in 80s New York studio excess."

== Track listing ==
Side one
No.	Title	Writer(s)	Vocals	Length
1.	"Little Too Good to Me"	Alan Rich; Jeff Pescetto	Elisa Fiorillo	4:20
2.	"Who Found Who"	Paul Gurvitz	Fiorillo	4:47
3.	"Just a Mirage"	Toni C.; Adele Bertei	Bertei	4:44
4.	"Am I Dreaming"	Toni C.; Mary Kessler; Bertei; Sadik	Bertei	4:58

Side two
No.	Title	Writer(s)	Vocals	Length
5.	"The Real Thing"	Arnie Roman; Toni C.	Steven Dante	5:40
6.	"Walking in My Sleep"	Ian Prince; Bertei	Dante	4:44
7.	"Hypnotized (By Your Touch)"	Jellybean; Bertei; David Bryant	Bertei	4:30
8.	"Jingo"	Michael Olatunji		7:43

2012 Cherry Red reissue bonus tracks
No.	Title	Writer(s)	Vocals	Length
9.	"Who Found Who" (U.S. Club Mix)	Gurvitz	Fiorillo
10.	"Jingo" (U.K. House Mix)	Olatunji
11.	"Just a Mirage" (12" Remix)	Toni C.; Bertei	Bertei
12.	"The Real Thing" (West 26th Street Mix)	Roman; Toni C.	Dante
13.	"Sidewalk Talk" (Dance Mix)	Madonna	Catherine Buchanan

== Personnel ==
Adapted from the Just Visiting This Planet liner notes.

=== Musicians ===
- Linden Aaron – Simmons drums
- Adele Bertei – lead vocals, backing vocals, rap, vocal arrangement
- Dave "Rev" Boruff – saxophone
- Jocelyn Brown – backing vocals
- David Bryant – synthesizers
- Toni C. – drum programming, synthesizers, arranger, vocal arrangement
- Felicia Collins – guitar
- Paulinho da Costa – percussion
- Steven Dante – lead vocals, rap
- Carol Dennis – backing vocals
- Elisa Fiorillo – lead vocals, vocal arrangement
- Paul Fox – synthesizers
- Siedah Garrett – backing vocals, vocal arrangement
- Jellybean – drum programming, percussion, backing vocals, synthesizers, arranger, vocal arrangement
- Connie Harvey – backing vocals
- Paul Jackson Jr. – guitar
- Bashiri Johnson – percussion
- Mary Kessler – synthesizers, arranger
- Edie Lehmann – backing vocals
- Eddie Martinez – guitar, rhythm guitar
- Jimmy Maelen – percussion
- Cindy Mizelle – backing vocals
- Wendell Morrison – backing vocals
- Paul Pesco – guitar solo
- Darryl Phinnessee – backing vocals
- Bob Quaranta – piano
- Carmine Rojas – bass guitar
- Frank Simms – backing vocals
- Neil Stubenhaus – bass guitar
- Fonzi Thornton – backing vocals
- Maxine Waters – backing vocals
- Audrey Wheeler – backing vocals
- David Williams – guitar
- Dweezil Zappa – electric guitar
- Fred Zarr – synthesizers, arranger

=== Production ===
- Produced by Jellybean for Jellybean Productions, Inc.
- Mix engineer: Michael Hutchinson
- Additional engineers: Joe Chiccarelli, Jay Mark, JC Convertino, Ed Thacker, Mark Roule, Gordon Fordyce
- Assistant engineers: Don Feinberg, Nick Delre, Mark Roule, Craig Vogel, Jeff Lorezen, John Hedges, Mark McKenna
- Production coordinator: Doreen Dorion
- A&R coordinators: Jeff Aldrich & Susan Collins
- Originally mastered by: George Marino at Sterling Sound, New York City
- Direction: Brendan Bourke for BB Management
- Art direction & design: Norman Moore
- Photography: Phillip Dixon

== Charts ==
Chart performance for Just Visiting This Planet
Chart (1987–1988)	Peak position
Dutch Albums (Album Top 100)	50
UK Albums (Official Charts)	15
US Billboard 200	101

== Certifications ==
Region	Certification	Certified units/sales
United Kingdom (BPI)	Gold	100,000^{^}
^{^} Shipments figures based on certification alone.
