= List of Alvin and the Chipmunks (1983 TV series) episodes =

Alvin and the Chipmunks is an American animated television series featuring the Chipmunks, produced by Bagdasarian Productions in association with Ruby-Spears Enterprises from 1983 to 1987, Murakami-Wolf-Swenson in 1988 and DIC Entertainment from 1988 to 1990.

== Series overview ==
Season	Episodes	Originally released	
Season	Episodes	First released	Last released
1	13	September 17, 1983	December 10, 1983
2	13	September 8, 1984	December 1, 1984
3	10	September 14, 1985	November 16, 1985
4	8	September 13, 1986	November 1, 1986
5	8	September 12, 1987	October 31, 1987
6	24	September 10, 1988	February 18, 1989
7	13	September 9, 1989	December 16, 1989
8	13	September 8, 1990	December 1, 1990

== Ruby-Spears episodes (Alvin and the Chipmunks) ==
=== Season 1 (1983) ===
No.	Title	Story by	Original release date
1a	"The C-Team"	Michael Maurer & Matt Uitz	September 17, 1983
After Alvin, Simon, and Theodore borrow Dave's antique gold pocket watch for Show and Tell at school, neighborhood bullies steal it. The Chipmunks find Mr. T to ask him for advice and with his help, they manage to get the watch back. Song: The C-Team
1b	"The Chipettes"	Janice Karman, Ross Bagdasarian, Cliff Ruby & Elana Lesser	September 17, 1983
The Chipmunks meet Brittany, Jeanette, and Eleanor for the first time. However, there is one problem: both groups believe they have a claim to the name "The Chipmunks". Song: We Aim to Please (a We Got the Beat parody/remix)
2a	"Uncle Harry"	Janice Karman, Ross Bagdasarian, Cliff Ruby & Elana Lesser	September 24, 1983
A charlatan chipmunk named Harry claims to be the Chipmunks' long lost uncle and says he will have them see their mother as soon as they make enough money. The Chipmunks later not only find out that Harry is not their uncle but also the money he has them making is for a strongman whom he has owed money to for a long time. Song: Working Day and Night
2b	"Rock 'n' Robot"	Gordon Kent, Jack Enyart, Tom Swale & Duane Poole	September 24, 1983
The Chipmunks create a robot out of Alvin's video game, so that it can carry all of their equipment to their concerts. But, the robot goes berserk when it begins to capture every hat it sees, like the video game it was created from, and it is up to the Chipmunks to stop the robot. Song: Honest Fun
3a	"The Television Stars"	Ross Bagdasarian, Janice Karman, Tom Swale & Duane Poole	October 1, 1983
Alvin tells a girl, Julie, he wants to impress that they are going to be starring in a rock concert on live TV, but Alvin must convince the producer to let them play. Songs: Something Told Me and Mister Winter's Birthday
3b	"The Cruise"	Janice Karman & Ross Bagdasarian	October 1, 1983
Alvin unknowingly assists a jewel thief steal some jewelry from a cabin on their cruise ship, and Simon and Theodore begin to investigate the crime. Song: Cruisin
4	"The Chipmunks Story"	Janice Karman, Ross Bagdasarian, Gordon Kent & Jack Enyart	October 8, 1983
The origin of the Chipmunks is revealed, including how Dave ended up with them in the first place, as well as how their musical career got started. Songs: The Snake Song and Witch Doctor
5a	"Mr. Fabulous"	Buzz Dixon, Tom Swale & Duane Poole	October 15, 1983
Alvin and Simon have Theodore enter a wrestling exhibition under the name "Mr. Fabulous" and he goes up against a monstrous Russian wrestler called Ivan the Terrible. Song: Pump, Pump, Pump
5b	"Grandpa and Grandma Seville"	Janice Karman, Ross Bagdasarian & Kayte Kuch	October 15, 1983
The Chipmunks meet their grandparents for the first time. Then, when they discover that someone is trying to take over their grandparents' farm, they decide to raise the money needed to save the farm. Song: We Wish You a Happy Birthday (to the tune "We Wish You a Merry Christmas")
6a	"Unidentified Flying Chipmunk"	Tom Swale & Duane Poole	October 22, 1983
Alvin convinces Theodore to dress up as an alien to attract more fans, but they also attract some investigators with the government who research UFOs. The investigators decide to kidnap Theodore and perform experiments on him and Alvin and Simon must think of a way to save him. Song: There's No Rock & Roll on Mars
6b	"Mother's Day"	Ross Bagdasarian, Janice Karman, Gordon Kent & Jack Enyart	October 22, 1983
Alvin, Simon and Theodore go in search for a mother to attend their school Mother's Day picnic. Each choose the person that they each think Dave will like best. But, when all three of their choices arrive at their house, Alvin, Simon, and Theodore will do anything to make sure their choice wins. Song: It's Your Mother (to the tune "Dance of the Hours")
7a	"The Chip-Punks"	Buzz Dixon, Gordon Kent & Jack Enyart	October 29, 1983
Alvin decides to change the Chipmunks' clean-cut image to a punkier, more rebellious one in order to gain more publicity, but the trio ends up running from the police when they attempt to perform in an underground club. Song: We Don't Care
7b	"From Here to Fraternity"	Michael Maurer & Matt Uitz	October 29, 1983
The Chipmunks make up a singing telegraph service to help buy some golf clubs for Dave's birthday. But when Theodore loses the addresses, the boys are sent on a birthday mission, for a $100 bonus. Except, that when Theodore wrote the number he wrote it upside down, so the Chipmunks end up going to the wrong house and are tricked into doing some different pranks for some college students who are bored. Songs: 3-Ring Birthday and Every 365th Day of the Year
8a	"Urban Chipmunk"	Janice Karman, Ross Bagdasarian, Tom Swale & Duane Poole	November 5, 1983
The boys enter a contest so that they can win a chance to sing with Dolly Parton. But contest rules state only natives of Nashville, Tennessee are eligible. The boys enter the contest anyway, but make an enemy when they win. Fiddlin' Freddie, a fiddle player who got second place in the contest, is determined to prove that the Chipmunks are not from Nashville, and win his chance to sing with Dolly Parton. Song: We Love the Country
8b	"The Incredible Shrinking Dave"	Janice Karman, Ross Bagdasarian, Cliff Ruby & Elana Lesser	November 5, 1983
Dave has a nightmare of himself getting smaller and smaller. Songs: One Way or Another and What'll I Do
9a	"Angelic Alvin"	Dianne Dixon, Ross Bagdasarian & Janice Karman	November 12, 1983
Alvin is upset about his role as an angel in the school play. However, after a bump on the head, he believes he really IS an angel. It is now up to Simon and Theodore to make sure he does not mess up things TOO badly with his so-called "good deeds". Note: For unknown reasons, this segment was not shown on Nickelodeon. Instead, "A Dog's Best Friend Is His Chipmunk" was shown. Song: Heart Attack
9b	"The Trouble With Nanny"	Matt Uitz, Ross Bagdasarian & Janice Karman	November 12, 1983
Dave hires a nanny to take care of the Chipmunks when he is away at work, and the Chipmunks will do anything to get rid of her. Song: Crazy Little Thing Called Love
10a	"The Bully Ballet"	Janice Karman, Ross Bagdasarian & Kayte Kuch	November 19, 1983
The Chipmunks invite a boy to stay with them who is a ballet dancer, and when a bully begins to torment Alvin, he shows the bully that ballet is cool. Song: Runnin' Fast
10b	"Alvin... and the Chipmunk"	Ross Bagdasarian, Janice Karman, Gordon Kent & Jack Enyart	November 19, 1983
Alvin demands a short trip away from obsessed fans who begin following him everywhere he goes. So, the Chipmunks go for a picnic out in the woods, only to be found again by their fans. Alvin runs off into the woods, and runs into a wild chipmunk. He decides to change places with the chipmunk, and he stays in the chipmunk's tree, while the wild chipmunk takes his place. All goes well until the real Alvin is caught by a hunter that holds him hostage. Simon, Theodore, and the wild chipmunk must save Alvin. Song: It Feels So Right (John McKindle song)
11a	"Swiss Family Chipmunks"	Ross Bagdasarian, Janice Karman, Cliff Ruby & Elana Lesser	November 26, 1983
Hoping to get away from Shifty Jackson and his team of tabloid reporters, Dave drags the Chipmunks unwillingly on a camping trip in the great outdoors. When they finally arrive, the Chipmunks discover large footprints and think they are being followed by Bigfoot. Eventually they build a tree house for Dave, when he falls and injures himself badly, and Alvin and Simon go in search for Bigfoot. Song: It's a Jungle out There
11b	"Santa Harry"	Ross Bagdasarian, Janice Karman, Cliff Ruby & Elana Lesser	November 26, 1983
Charlatan chipmunk Harry returns and this time pretends to be Santa Claus and cons Alvin, Simon and Theodore into building a Christmas-themed amusement park called "Santa's Place". Song: Here Comes Santa Claus
12a	"A Dog's Best Friend Is His Chipmunk"	Buzz Dixon, Ross Bagdasarian & Janice Karman	December 3, 1983
Alvin donates money to an animal fund and discovers that they do not have any money. In an attempt to earn some money, the boys decide to resell the cookies that Theodore bought with their money by dressing as Girl Cadets. When Theodore finds a dog, he feeds it all their cookies. His brothers find out and decide to hide the dog from Dave. Simon later finds the dog's name is Pretty and that she belongs to an elderly man, Mr. Veevers, so the boys reunite Pretty with her owner. Song: I Enjoy Being a Girl (modified version)
12b	"The Curse of Lontiki"	Dianne Dixon	December 3, 1983
When the Chipmunks go to Hawaii, Alvin enters a surfing contest, and becomes convinced that he is cursed when he finds a medallion on the beach that is supposed to bring bad luck. Song: Surfin' U.S.A. (replaced with Surfin' Safari on DVD)
13a	"Baseball Heroes"	Dianne Dixon & F. James Barry	December 10, 1983
The Chipmunks get a job as vendors at a baseball stadium to pay for new uniforms for their baseball team, and in the process stop a pickpocket who has been stealing money. Song: The Star-Spangled Banner
13b	"May the Best Chipmunk Win"	Janice Karman, Ross Bagdasarian, Cliff Ruby & Elana Lesser	December 10, 1983
The Chipettes move to the Chipmunks' school and Alvin and Brittany run against each other for class president. Both will stop at nothing to win, but when the polls are revealed they discover that Jeanette has the deciding vote. Songs: It's My Party and Celebration

=== Season 2 (1984) ===
No. overall	No. in season	Title	Story by	Original release date
14a	1a	"The Chipmunk Who Bugged Me"	Jack Enyart	September 8, 1984
While on a train from Paris, the famed Orient Express, some important papers are stolen and Alvin uses his recently acquired Official Top Secret Spy Manual to help solve the real-life mystery. Song: Secret Agent Man
14b	1b	"Rich and Infamous"	Gordon Kent	September 8, 1984
Alvin and a rich kid compete for a girl's affections. Alvin pretends he is as rich as his rival. Song: Uptown Girl
15a	2a	"Don't Be a Vidiot"	Buzz Dixon	September 15, 1984
Alvin, Simon and Theodore each make their own music videos for the group. Song: Puttin' On the Ritz
15b	2b	"A Horse, of Course"	Dianne Dixon	September 15, 1984
The Chipmunks invest in an old broken-down horse to win a race. Song: Break My Stride
16a	3a	"The Camp Calomine Caper"	Dianne Dixon	September 22, 1984
The Chipmunks compete against the Chipettes in a camp battle of the sexes. Song: Hit Me with Your Best Shot
16b	3b	"Lights, Camera, Alvin"	Matt Uitz	September 22, 1984
"Uncle" Harry is up to no good again. This time, he makes Alvin a movie star so he can break up the Chipmunks. Song: Breaking Up Is Hard to Do
17a	4a	"Some Entrancing Evening"	Jack Enyart	September 29, 1984
The Chipmunks put Dave on the show "This Is Your Father", but he is nervous about it. So a hypnotist makes him have Alvin's personality, which turns out to be a disastrous move. Song: Dear Old Dave
17b	4b	"Match Play"	Buzz Dixon	September 29, 1984
The Chipmunks trick Dave to play golf with a man that Alvin made a wager with. What Dave does not realize is that Alvin bet his signed "Elmer Palmer" golf club. Song: It Don't Mean a Thing (If It Ain't Got That Swing)
18a	5a	"The Picture of Health"	Sheryl Scarborough	October 6, 1984
Alvin decides that he, Simon and Theodore all need to join a gym, but to get in for free they have to go through some pretty strange "transformations". Song: When I'm Sixty-Four (replaced with When You're Old and Gray on DVD)
18b	5b	"The Victrola Awards"	Janis Diamond	October 6, 1984
Alvin and the Chipmunks attempt to grab good publicity shots of them doing positive deeds in order to win the fabulous Victrola Award. Song: Old Time Rock and Roll
19a	6a	"Royally Received"	David Schwartz	October 13, 1984
The Chipmunks get to see Buckingham Palace, and Alvin, in an attempt to impress a girl who is a big fan, tells her he is there to play for the Queen. Now, all he has to do is find the Queen and convince her to let them play. Song: Rock This Town
19b	6b	"Gone Fishin'"	Rowby Goren	October 13, 1984
The Chipmunks get a job working in an aquarium to help Simon with his science project, and help stop a jealous former worker after he kidnaps one of the aquarium's two prized dolphins. Song: The Boys Are Back in Town
20a	7a	"Setting the Record Straight"	Dianne Dixon	October 20, 1984
Alvin and Simon turn Theodore into a record mascot in order to win a radio contest. Song: On the Road Again
20b	7b	"Father's Day Muffins"	Matt Uitz	October 20, 1984
The Chipmunks sell Theodore's famous muffins so they can buy Dave a new tape recorder, but a mix-up in making the batter causes the muffins to become hard. Song: Whip It
21a	8a	"Alvin on Ice"	Janis Diamond	October 27, 1984
Alvin plans to get a famous figure skater, Heather Williams, to appear at the school pageant. Song: You Might Think
21b	8b	"Operation Theodore"	Janice Karman & Ross Bagdasarian	October 27, 1984
The Chipettes are volunteering at the local hospital, and Theodore stops by to bring Eleanor her homework, but Theodore ends up missing. Song: The Longest Time
22a	9a	"The Gang's All Here"	Dianne Dixon	November 3, 1984
Alvin ends up being challenged by a gang called the Steam Rollers. Song: Beat It
22b	9b	"Snow Job"	Cliff Ruby & Elana Lesser	November 3, 1984
Alvin is determined in getting an invitation to participate in the Celebrity Ski Tournament. Once he convinces Mr. Colorado, the man hosting the event, to let him participate, all Alvin has to do then is learn how to ski. Song: Footloose
23a	10a	"Maids in Japan"	Jack Enyart	November 10, 1984
Alvin signs him and his brothers up to be in a Kabuki theater in order to gain publicity in Japan. Instead of getting lessons, they are forced to perform as the actual players. Song: Three Little Maids from School from The Mikado
23b	10b	"My Fair Chipette"	Janice Karman & Ross Bagdasarian	November 10, 1984
Alvin makes a bet with Brittany to see if he could make anyone into a beauty pageant winner. The challenge gets interesting when Jeanette is the girl he has to transform into beauty pageant material. Songs: On the Good Ship Lollipop and Miss Wonderful
24a	11a	"New, Improved Simon"	Rowby Goren	November 17, 1984
Simon has a crush on a girl named Jillian. Alvin works at changing his image in order to impress this girl. Song: Born to Be Wild
24b	11b	"The Greatest Show-Offs on Earth"	Cliff Ruby & Elana Lesser	November 17, 1984
The Chipmunks and Chipettes volunteer their talents to raise the money to keep Uncle Ben's Circus going, as well as saving Pinky, the circus's elephant. Song: Girls Just Want to Have Fun
25a	12a	"Guardian Chipmunks"	F. James Barry	November 24, 1984
Dave starts up a neighborhood watch to catch a cat burglar. The Chipmunks take it upon themselves to capture the cat burglar single-handedly. Song: The C-Team
25b	12b	"Carsick"	Cliff Ruby & Elana Lesser	November 24, 1984
The Chipmunks get the measles. Dave spends so much time taking care of his boys that he becomes sick with the measles and is not able to fix his car for the car show. It is up to the boys to take care of everything for Dave. Song: Little Deuce Coupe
26a	13a	"Hat Today Gone Tomorrow"	Cliff Ruby & Elana Lesser	December 1, 1984
Alvin goes crazy when he loses his beloved red cap, and starts searching for it. Song: The Heart of Rock & Roll
26b	13b	"Snow Wrong"	Dianne Dixon	December 1, 1984
The Chipmunks and Chipettes audition to be in a Snow White play. Songs: Good Friends and I Have a Dream

=== Season 3 (1985) ===
No. overall	No. in season	Title	Story by	Original release date
27a	1a	"Film Flam"	Jack Enyart	September 14, 1985
The Chipmunks decide to make a greatest hits video, but they hire a cut-rate film editor to produce it. He accidentally switches the video with Dave’s old home movies of the Chipmunks as infants. Song: Rip It Up
27b	1b	"The Secret Life of Dave Seville"	Jack Enyart	September 14, 1985
Alvin suspects that Dave is leading some kind of double life. He, Simon and Theodore each interview some of Dave’s old friends to find out what his secret might be. Song: I'm Sorry
28a	2a	"Who Ghost There?"	Jack Enyart	September 21, 1985
The Chipmunks are stuck at home without lights, and think the house is haunted. Song: Ghostbusters
28b	2b	"Romancing Miss Stone"	Cliff Ruby & Elana Lesser	September 21, 1985
Alvin gets a crush on his teacher, Miss Stone. He later becomes jealous when Dave starts dating her. Song: Sharp Dressed Man
29a	3a	"A Chip Off the Old Tooth"	Matt Uitz	September 28, 1985
Theodore loses a tooth, and Alvin dresses up as the Tooth Fairy to try to cash in. Song: Goodbye to You (modified version)
29b	3b	"Three Alarm Alvin"	Michael Maurer	September 28, 1985
The Chipmunks decide to start their own fire department to gain publicity. They do not really have any emergencies, but when Theodore spots a real fire, it is up to the Chipmunk Fire Dept. to extinguish the blaze. But then the real fire department has to rescue the Chipmunks. Note: For unknown reasons, this segment was not shown on Nickelodeon. Instead, "Staying Afloat" was shown. Song: Holding Out for a Hero
30a	4a	"Sisters"	Dianne Dixon	October 5, 1985
Brittany tries to join the Sisters, a club of the best-dressed, most popular girls in school. But in order to do so she has to avoid her own sister Jeanette, whose clumsiness and unpopularity would destroy her chances of getting into the club. Since she and Jeanette are working on a science project that involves taking care of a baby pig, this leaves Jeanette to do the project alone. Song: Material Girl
30b	4b	"Court Action"	Dianne Dixon	October 5, 1985
Alvin plagiarizes his book report and will not be allowed to play in the championship basketball game until the Student Honor Court acquits him. But it is Theodore’s turn to be the judge. Song: Get Nervous
31a	5a	"Good Old Simon"	Dianne Dixon & Matt Uitz	October 12, 1985
Feeling unloved and unappreciated, Simon runs away and decides to stow away on a cargo ship. Theodore and Alvin find him, but not before the ship leaves for parts unknown. Song: Some Guys Have All the Luck
31b	5b	"The Chipmunks Go to Washington"	Cliff Ruby, Elana Lesser, Ross Bagdasarian & Janice Karman	October 12, 1985
Dave, the Chipmunks and Chipettes go to Washington, D.C. to lobby the president to save a nest of bald eagles on Mount Placid that has been threatened by a condominium development. Song: Up Where We Belong
32a	6a	"Soccer to Me"	Dianne Dixon	October 19, 1985
Alvin needs one more player for his soccer team. The only one qualified to play is Brittany's little sister Eleanor. Song: Legs
32b	6b	"Every Chipmunk Tells a Story"	Jack Enyart	October 19, 1985
While Dave is out, his piano, laden with instant pudding, mysteriously crashes to the floor from the top of the staircase and is destroyed. But Alvin, Simon and Theodore each have a different version of what happened. Song: The Heat Is On
33a	7a	"A Little Worm in the Big Apple"	Cliff Roberts	October 26, 1985
"Uncle" Harry returns, this time to con the Chipettes while they are visiting New York. Song: On Broadway
33b	7b	"Staying Afloat"	Dianne Dixon	October 26, 1985
While on a waterskiing vacation with the Chipettes, Alvin forgets to tie up the boat belonging to Dave’s friend Ed, and it sinks. Song: Vacation
34	8	"The Chipette Story"	Janice Karman & Ross Bagdasarian	November 2, 1985
The origin of the Chipettes is revealed when they are reunited with their old Australian friend Olivia, which prompts the singers to remember their younger days when they were just little tiny baby Chipettes living in Miss Grudge's orphanage in Australia with Olivia not trying to have a career, only trying to survive. The Chipettes successfully make their way into the United States, yet they find out the hard way that getting there is only half the battle. After taking various odd jobs in middle management, the Chipettes travel across the country to California. There, the girls manage to find a famous record producer who after hearing their first song, gives the Chipettes the break they were looking for. Songs: New Attitude, Tomorrow and Neutron Dance (Note: New Attitude and The Neutron Dance are replaced with 2 Original songs "You are Beautiful" and "Keep Dancing" on The Chipettes: The Glass Slipper Collection DVD)
35a	9a	"The Prize Isn't Right"	Jack Enyart	November 9, 1985
Simon goes on a trivia game show, but he gets the flu before he can show up for subsequent appearances. Theodore and Alvin dress up as Simon and go in his place. Song: Magic Bus
35b	9b	"The Gold of My Dreams"	Cliff Ruby & Elana Lesser	November 9, 1985
Alvin sells Dave's motor home to buy their own gold claim land. Songs: We're in the Money (international versions instead had I Need That Gold Tonight, a modified version of I Need Your Love Tonight)
36a	10a	"Mind Over Matterhorn"	Dianne Dixon	November 16, 1985
While the Chipmunks are on tour in Switzerland, Brittany is depressed about the Chipettes’ relative lack of fame. So Alvin arranges for the ultimate Swiss publicity stunt: the gang will climb the Matterhorn and the Chipettes will give a concert at the mountain’s peak. But they soon become trapped in an avalanche. Song: Jump (For My Love)
36b	10b	"Alvin's Oldest Fan"	Dianne Dixon	November 16, 1985
Alvin devises a publicity contest where one of Alvin's fans can win a date with him. Unfortunately for Alvin, the winner is an old lady named Honey Ginger, and he tries to get rid of her for another, younger date. Song: Bad to the Bone

=== Season 4 (1986) ===
No. overall	No. in season	Title	Written by	Original release date
37	1	"Help Wanted: Mommy"	Dianne Dixon	September 13, 1986
Miss Mooney, the Chipmunks’ teacher, discovers that the Chipettes live alone, thanks to Brittany's ruse that went awry, and has to report them to social services. Dave takes them in, but they begin fighting with the Chipmunks, so Alvin arranges for next-door spinster Miss Miller to take them in. Songs: New Attitude and I Wanna Be Loved by You
38a	2a	"Teevee or Not Teevee"	Jack Enyart	September 20, 1986
The Chipmunks are scheduled to appear on The Johnny Letterman Show, but their act is canceled when a Russian Premier also scheduled to appear announces he will be arriving early. The Chipmunks follow Johnny and his crew to the airport and try to sneak in so they can play their act on television. Song: Talk to Me
38b	2b	"A Rash of Babies"	Jack Enyart	September 20, 1986
The Chipmunks start a babysitting service, only to be bombarded with wall-to-wall babies. Songs: What's the Matter With Kids Today? and Theodore's Lullaby
39a	3a	"Whatever Happened to Dave Seville?"	Dianne Dixon	September 27, 1986
When Dave wins a producer’s award, a wax figure of him for a Hall of Fame is delivered, unbeknownst to the Chipmunks. While playing ball in the house, which Dave strictly forbid before he left, Alvin hits the wax figure of Dave with his ball, toppling him over. After watching a soap opera, they think he has developed a strange disease called "Zomboid rigidosis" and begin retelling his life for him, hoping he will snap out of it. Song: First Date
39b	3b	"Simon Seville, Superstar"	Barbara Chain	September 27, 1986
Alvin becomes jealous when Simon becomes a celebrity in Australia, so he arranges for the group to get lost in the Australian outback so he can "rescue" them and co-opt Simon's fame. Song: Help!
40a	4a	"Miss Miller's Big Gamble"	Dianne Dixon	October 4, 1986
After the Chipettes rig Miss Miller’s poker game, she takes them to Las Vegas and becomes a compulsive gambler. She is finally cured when another gambler defeats her in a high-stakes game of blackjack, only to return his winnings after she learns her lesson. The other gambler turns out to be David Seville, the Chipmunks' father, in disguise. Song: The Gambler
40b	4b	"Sweet Smell of Success"	Elinor Pullen	October 4, 1986
Brittany attempts to market her own perfume by giving some to the Queen of Bulgravia, the wife of Dave's former college roommate, but it ends up getting switched with a bottle of fish soup, and the gang must find a way to switch them back before the Queen notices. Song: Manic Monday
41	5	"Cinderella? Cinderella!"	Dianne Dixon	October 11, 1986
When Brittany refuses to do her chores, Miss Miller tells her that she must mop if she wishes to go to a dance that night. Brittany falls asleep and dreams she is Cinderella. She awakens to find a new party dress and Miss Miller mopping half the floor for her. Brittany realizes she is not living with the wicked stepmother after all. Song: Respect and Tutti Frutti
42a	6a	"Experiment in Error"	Elinor Pullen	October 18, 1986
Alvin refuses to take Brittany to the Black and White Ball, the biggest social event of the season. So after Alvin causes Brittany to get into an accident in Simon’s laboratory, she convinces him into believing that she has turned into a zombie so he will take her to the ball. Song: Here She Comes
42b	6b	"How You Gonna Keep 'Em Down on the Farm?"	Dianne Dixon	October 18, 1986
Theodore goes on the lam to help save Clarence, Grandpa Seville’s prize-winning calf, from becoming veal. Song: On the Road Again
43a	7a	"Middle-Aged Davey"	Elinor Pullen	October 25, 1986
Dave starts feeling old on his birthday, so the Chipmunks set him up on a date with Marcy Apple, his old college sweetheart. But she was soon going to be married, so he goes out with Bambi, her younger sister (who is young enough to be his daughter) and they soon begin seeing each other regularly, to the Chipmunks’ chagrin. Song: Addicted to Love
43b	7b	"I Love L.A."	Dianne Dixon	October 25, 1986
Alvin is obsessed with getting a star on the Hollywood Walk of Fame before Dan the Dog gets his, and cooks up a number of schemes to try to get one. Song: I Love L.A.
44a	8a	"Chipmunk Vice"	Jack Enyart	November 1, 1986
In a spoof of Miami Vice. Alvin is sick with the flu, and in a dream, is a slick detective in pastel shirts looking for his missing prized baseball card who he believes a mysterious criminal called the "Shadow" took. Song: Sidewalk Talk
44b	8b	"Hooping It Up"	Dianne Dixon	November 1, 1986
The Chipmunks, the Chipettes, and a tough group of older students participate in a 1950s-themed scavenger hunt at school. Song: My Boyfriend's Back

=== Season 5 (1987) ===
No. overall	No. in season	Title	Written by	Original release date
45a	1a	"Back to Dave's Future"	Elinor Pullen	September 12, 1987
A wild ride on a merry-go-round sends the Chipmunks back to 1962, where they meet a younger Dave. Without the boys' help in winning a band contest, he will spend his life as an accountant. Song: High Tech World
45b	1b	"Tell It to the Judge"	Jack Enyart	September 12, 1987
Alvin "borrows" Dave's new bike, and while he is out riding he almost hits Brittany who is out roller skating, causing him to crash. The bike is ruined, and her skates are scratched. They each blame each other, and Alvin demands Brittany pay for Dave's bike, while she insists he pay for her roller skates. All of this brings us to court, where Brittany and Alvin, ignoring the "TRUTH" part in "truth, justice and the American way" face off in a "who can tell a better lie about what happened" televised court battle. Song: Fun, Fun, Fun
46a	2a	"Sincerely Theodore"	Dorothy Middleton	September 19, 1987
Theodore goes on a diet so he can go on a date with a pen pal, Molly, who is also one of Alvin's biggest fans. Things go wrong when Alvin finds out that Theodore's date is actually the daughter of a famous film director. Alvin then takes her out instead, breaking Theodore's heart. In order for Alvin to make it to his play and the date, Alvin gets Theodore to switch back and forth to his play and on his date. Song: Twist and Shout
46b	2b	"My Pharaoh Lady"	Dianne Dixon	September 19, 1987
Miss Miller has broken her leg. Jeanette and Eleanor are taking care of her, bringing her food, pillows, and her cat. Dave voluntarily takes both the girls and boys to the downtown Museum of History as part of their school field trip. Brittany makes a bet with Missy Snootson (voiced by Tress MacNeille), another girl in her class, that if the Egyptian mummy of Rootentooten does not temporarily resurrect from his sarcophagus and visit her home by midnight, Brittany must drop out of the final school Carnival Queen election. Song: Walk Like an Egyptian
47a	3a	"Simon Says"	Kayte Kuch & Sheryl Scarborough	September 26, 1987
While Dave is out of town, Miss Miller babysits the boys and they go to a movie about killer space squids attacking the earth. Miss Miller breaks Simon's glasses accidentally. When they get out a telescope that evening, Simon thinks he sees killer space squids coming toward earth, just like in the movie. Song: Purple People Eater
47b	3b	"When the Chips Are Down"	Dianne Dixon	September 26, 1987
The boys have to paint the garage after they got spray paint on the walls while repainting their bicycles. Simon and Theodore feel bad because they always have problems with Alvin's ideas. Later Alvin have them to go to a mansion of a dead criminal. Alvin is convinced that never found loot from a bank robbery is still hidden there. They go because Alvin promises to paint the entire garage if he is wrong, but they feel a little bad about Alvin. Song: Stand by Me
48a	4a	"Alvin, Alvin, Alvin!"	Ted Field	October 3, 1987
Alvin goes through an identity crisis and starts trying all kinds of different personalities, with embarrassing results. Song: I've Gotta Be Me
48b	4b	"Dave's Dream Cabin"	Christi Olson	October 3, 1987
After years of scrimping and saving, Dave is finally able to afford their own vacation cabin. Alvin hears that Robby Leach, the host of the show “Lifestyles of the Truly Fabulous” lives nearby. Alvin tries to get Leach to interview him, and at the same time he makes a few quick changes to Dave's cabin. Song: Yakety Yak
49a	5a	"Old Friends"	Ted Field	October 10, 1987
Alvin nearly runs over an elderly woman in the mall with his skateboard. When Alvin finds out that she is wealthy, he sends out invitations for a senior citizens' party in order to find her. Song: Hip to Be Square
49b	5b	"The Mystery of Seville Manor"	Dianne Dixon	October 10, 1987
While in England, the Chipmunks check out Seville Manor to investigate if they have any relation to Lord Seville, the man who owned it. Song: You Keep Me Hangin' On
50a	6a	"Ask Alvin"	Max Ross	October 17, 1987
The family becomes fed up with Alvin, who always gives out advice whether it is wanted or not. So Simon and Theodore get Alvin to become the new host on the talk show “Mr. Advice” so he will not have time to badger them. Song: Rock Around the Clock
50b	6b	"Theodore Lucks Out"	Christi Olson	October 17, 1987
Theodore is feeling unlucky in the track and field, particularly since Dave won the pole vault in his younger years. Theodore finds a bent out of shape dime and after qualifying for the big game, passing a spelling test and meeting a new girl, he is convinced he now has good luck. Song: It's So Easy
51a	7a	"Big Dreams"	Dianne Dixon	October 24, 1987
Alvin gets a registered letter from the Publishing Warehouse stating he is a winner. He either can take $500 or the mystery prize (which might end up to be a million dollars or nothing more than a free lunch), but has to call by 6:00 p.m. to decide. So Simon uses his experimental time machine to get a glimpse into two futures for them all, dependent on whether Alvin accepts the mystery prize or the $500 cash prize. Song: Everybody Have Fun Tonight
51b	7b	"Island Fever"	Ted Field	October 24, 1987
The Chipmunks and Chipettes get to perform on a high class cruise ship, the Island Lady, but Alvin is angry at Brittany for making a colorful poster of the Chipettes while putting embarrassing baby pictures of the Chipmunks in a small corner of it. Things get worse when the group gets tossed overboard and stranded on an island, leading to more infighting. Song: Summertime Blues
52a	8a	"Just One of the Girls"	Dianne Dixon	October 31, 1987
While on vacation in Hollywood with Miss Miller and her old singing group “The Thrillers,” the Chipettes decide to audition to be on a television program—while the Thrillers decide to do the same thing, after Brittany and Miss Miller promised each other they would steer clear of seeking stardom.: On NBC's Pacific Time Zone feed of the episode, the first minute of the episode's premiere was interrupted due to an NBC News Special Report on President Ronald Reagan's nomination to Douglas H. Ginsburg as part of the Supreme Court of the United States.; Song: Boogie Woogie Bugle Boy
52b	8b	"Goin' Down to Dixie"	Christi Olson	October 31, 1987
The Chipettes get an opportunity to star on the River Ritz Hotel in New Orleans, Louisiana, but Miss Miller can not get tickets on a full flight to New Orleans. Their only chance is through a sleazy man who grossly exaggerates his cut-rate travel service. Song: Proud Mary

== Murakami-Wolf-Swenson and DIC Entertainment episodes (The Chipmunks) ==
=== Season 6 (1988–89) ===
No. overall	No. in season	Title	Written by	Original release date
53	1	"Dreamlighting"	Jack Enyart	September 10, 1988
While waiting for a procrastinating Alvin on one of their dates, Brittany has a dream and becomes "Bratty Hayes" and Alvin becomes "David Alvinson", detective team. The plot revolves around Alvin trying to stop Brittany from marrying an evil villain – played by Simon. Song: Alvinson's Root Beer Cooler
54	2	"Elementary, My Dear Simon (also Known as Sherlock Seville)"	Richard Merwin	September 17, 1988
Simon hosts his own show, playing Sherlock Holmes investigating several mysterious robberies. Song: Home Skiddle De Doorey
55	3	"The Brunch Club"	Sean Roche & Barry O'Brien	September 24, 1988
In a parody/homage to The Breakfast Club, the Chipmunks and Chipettes are in detention in the school library, when they figure out together who could have knocked over the statue of Thomas Edison. Song: What Were You Doing at the Time?
56	4	"Food for Thought"	David Wiemers & Ken Koonce	October 1, 1988
Alvin and Simon work together to help Theodore pass his American History test. Song: History Rap
57	5	"Wings Over Siesta Grande"	Richard Merwin	October 8, 1988
While on vacation in Mexico, the Chipmunks stop a thief who is after ancient treasure with the help of a tribe of wild chipmunks. Songs: The Key and Witch Doctor
58	6	"Treasure Island"	Sean Roche & Barry O'Brien	October 15, 1988
After playing a video game, the TV blows up. Dave decides to distract the Chipmunks with the book Treasure Island. Song: The Sea Life
59	7	"Chipmunkmania"	Steve Moore	October 22, 1988
This episode takes a look back at the history of the Chipmunks' career by narrating flashbacks to past episodes. The episodes that the flashes are taken from are; "The Victrola Awards", "Big Dreams", "How You Gonna Keep 'Em Down on the Farm?", "Don't Be a Vidiot", "The Chipmunk Story", "Alvin's Oldest Fan", "Alvin, Alvin, Alvin!", "Maids in Japan", "The Chip-Punks", "Alvin on Ice", "A Horse, of Course", "My Fair Chipette", and "A Rash of Babies". Songs: Old Time Rock and Roll, Puttin' on the Ritz, Witch Doctor, Poopsie Cola (a Witch Doctor parody/remix), Three Little Maids From School, and Bad to the Bone
60	8	"Grounded Chipmunk"	Jack Enyart	October 29, 1988
Alvin is forced to clean up the house after throwing a wild party while Dave is away and is not allowed to go with his brothers to Fantasy Park, during which he combats his fear of loneliness, and experiences bizarre incidents including an alien. Song: Bippidee Bop With My Favorite Mop
61	9	"Alvie's Angels"	Sean Roche & Barry O'Brien	November 5, 1988
The Chipettes are Alvie's Angels, a crime fighting team out to hunt down the most popular jewel thief named Chazz Fleming. Song: Beat of the Jungle (an Eye of the Tiger parody/remix)
62	10	"Cadet's Regrets"	Sean Roche	November 12, 1988
Alvin enrolls himself and his brothers in cadet camp. The brothers consider running away when they think it is too tough, but an experience with a high-tech robotic jeep shows the Chipmunks that they must face their full potential. Song: Commandos
63	11	"Alvin in Analysis"	Jack Enyart	November 19, 1988
Alvin sees a psychologist to discuss family issues. Note: this is the last episode to be produced by Murakami-Wolf Swenson Songs: Goodbye to You, First Date, Rock Around the Clock and The Heat Is On
64	12	"Dave's Getting Married"	Ross Bagdasarian, Sue Shakespeare & Janice Karman	November 26, 1988
Dave meets a woman he really feels a strong connection with. At first, the boys disagree, but find she can get along with all of them. The only thing preventing this relationship to work is her own three boys clashing with the Chipmunks. Note: This is the first episode to be produced by DIC. Songs: She's Alright and Count on Me
65a	13a	"No Chipmunk Is an Island"	Sean Roche	December 3, 1988
Brothers will fight every so often, but will they fight too much, leading to each of the Chipmunks getting their own separate rooms? Song: Help Me Get Out
65b	13b	"Babysitter Fright Night"	Bruce Morris	December 3, 1988
Problems with the mix of the Chipmunks' new album cause Dave to be stuck at the studio all night, so he hires a babysitter to look after the Chipmunks while he is gone. After watching a detective movie, Alvin suspects her to be a murderer. Song: Babysitter Rock (a Jailhouse Rock parody/remix)
66	14	"Going for Broke"	David Weimers & Ken Koonce	December 10, 1988
Alvin is desperate to try to buy a $700 Trans-Go-Go-Bot, but Dave and his brothers will not lend him the money to get it. He decides to do the grown-up thing and get a job at the zoo. Note: This episode was re-titled on VHS as "Alvin's Summer Job". Songs: We're The Chipmunks (theme song) and Swing
67	15	"Once Upon a Crime"	Rebecca Rees	December 17, 1988
Alvin, Simon, and Theodore find a huge attraction to one of Miss Miller's toys. Instead of asking her if they could keep it, they steal it from her attic. Dave tells them the beginning of a story but chooses to let the boys come up with the conclusion. Song: Sorro (a spoof of Zorro)
68a	16a	"The Phantom"	Sue Shakespeare, Russ Miller, Patsy Cameron & Tedd Anasti	December 24, 1988
As an experiment Dave tries his skill as a rock singer and becomes a success. Song: The Phantom
68b	16b	"Mad About Alvin"	Patsy Cameron, Tedd Anasti & Therese Naugle	December 24, 1988
Alvin has a misunderstanding with a tough kid in his class, and ends up being challenged to a fight with him. Note: There is no song in this episode.
69	17	"Vinny's Visit"	Patsy Cameron & Tedd Anasti	December 31, 1988
Vinny, the Chipmunks' mother, comes for a visit for "Parents' Day", but has difficulties adapting to the modern way of life. Songs: Vinny's Lullaby and Girls of Rock 'n' Roll
70a	18a	"Uncle Adventure"	Tom Dunsmuir, Bruce Morris, Patsy Cameron & Tedd Anasti	January 7, 1989
Dave's Uncle Willy comes for visit. Although he gets along well with the Chipmunks and shares many of their interests, Dave is worried that his uncle is a senior citizen. It is up to the Chipmunks to show Dave that gray hair does not necessarily change a man's core. Song: You're Always Young as You Feel
70b	18b	"Luck O' The Chipmunks"	Sean Roche, Patsy Cameron & Tedd Anasti	January 7, 1989
Micky, a new Irish boy at school, claims that he has his very own leprechaun. The Chipmunks are keen to investigate. Song: Good Luck Charm
71a	19a	"Theodore and Juliet"	Bruce Morris, Patsy Cameron & Tedd Anasti	January 14, 1989
Theodore develops a crush on a girl in his class named Juliet. Wanting some expert advice, Theodore asks Alvin for his help. Unwillingly, Alvin says a romantic line that Juliet overhears and she ends up developing a crush on Alvin instead of Theodore. Song: Love Potion No. 9 (replaced by "Witch Doctor" on DVD.)
71b	19b	"Quarterback In Curlers"	Bruce Morris	January 14, 1989
Brittany tries out for Alvin's football team. To get even, Alvin joins her cheerleading squad. Song: Dare Me
72a	20a	"The Wall"	Patsy Cameron & Tedd Anasti	January 21, 1989
The Chipmunks go to Berlin to play in the "Wall of Iron" concert by the Berlin Wall. There they meet and befriend a young girl named Caterina who has a brother named Eric that lives on the other side. The Chipmunks inspire the Germans to tear down the wall. Song: The Wall
72b	20b	"The Amazing Chipmunks"	Evelyn A-R Gabai, Patsy Cameron & Tedd Anasti	January 21, 1989
A crook uses the Chipmunks' tour as camouflage for his own evil deeds: While people are out watching the Chipmunks' concerts, his trained chimpanzees raid the empty houses. Song: Great Balls Of Fire
73a	21a	"Theodore's Life as a Dog"	Bruce Morris	January 28, 1989
Alvin plays a prank on Theodore and gets him to eat a dog biscuit. To get even, Theodore, with Simon's help, plays a prank on Alvin and makes him think that his younger brother is actually turning into a were-dog. Song: Life of a Dog
73b	21b	"Queen of the High School Ballroom"	Rebecca Rees, Patsy Cameron & Tedd Anasti	January 28, 1989
Miss Miller is invited to go to her high school reunion. But without a boyfriend to go with, the Chipettes try to get one of the Chipmunks to dress up to be Miss Miller's date. Song: Be My Baby
74a	22a	"Psychic Alvin"	Bruce Morris	February 4, 1989
By a fluke, Alvin actually passes his math test, whereas Simon mysteriously fails. Afterwards, Alvin believes he is psychic, and so does everyone else, except Simon. Song: Mystic Guy
74b	22b	"A Special Kind of Champion"	Patsy Cameron, Tedd Anasti & Therese Naugle	February 4, 1989
Alvin is upset that he cannot seem to keep up with the rest of his track race team, so the coach decides to let him become a trainer for one of the athletes of the Special Olympics. Song: Over and Over
75a	23a	"Alvin's Obsession"	Therese Naugle	February 11, 1989
Alvin is upset that there is a new boy that just happens to be better at everything. To prove that Alvin has what it takes to beat this kid, he challenges him to anything he can think of. Song: Shakedown
75b	23b	"Alvin's Not So Super Hero"	Sean Roche & Barry O'Brien	February 11, 1989
Alvin gets an opportunity to meet his hero from his favorite TV show. Song: Holding Out For A Hero
76	24	"Dave's Wonderful Life"	Ross Bagdasarian, Janice Karman & Richard Merwin	February 18, 1989
Dave has been suffering financial setbacks when all of his recent songs got rejected, which triggers feelings of depression and worthlessness. Dave starts believing that it would be easier if he never existed, and is then shown visions of all three of the Chipmunks' futures if that were indeed so. Song: Wonderful Life

=== Season 7 (1989) ===
No. overall	No. in season	Title	Written by	Original release date
77	1	"Cookie Chomper III"	Jerry Rees	September 9, 1989
Theodore encounters a stray kitten that entered through an open window in the house. He and the boys take an instant liking to the kitten, and after some compromising, they name the kitten Cookie Chomper III, and after Dave is cured of his allergy to cats, he comes to like the kitten as well. After Cookie Chomper gets run over by a car and dies, the boys have a hard time dealing with it. Eventually, they get a new pet, a puppy they name Lilly. Song: Beautiful Memories
78a	2a	"Home Sweet Home"	Dianne Dixon & Denice Ferguson	September 16, 1989
Alvin lies to his classmates that he will be singing on stage with Michael Jackson. As Alvin tries to find Michael in order to see if it really is possible he could perform with him, he meets up with the big star's manager. To Alvin's surprise, this so-called manager is a homeless man looking to find a place to stay. Song: Billie Jean
78b	2b	"All Worked Up"	Janice Karman & Jack Enyart	September 16, 1989
The Chipmunks overhear Dave suggesting that he would prefer Alvin to be a gymnastic pizza twirler, Simon a pogo stick tester, and Theodore an iguana trainer, and immediately start to pursue those careers. Song: Do You Love Me
79a	3a	"Nightmare on Seville Street"	Bruce Morris	September 23, 1989
The boys disobey Dave and instead of seeing a kid's movie, they go in and see a horror movie. The movie ends up scaring the Chipmunks out of their wits. All night, the boys think that Hideous Harold, the creature from the horror film, is after them. Song: Hideous Harold
79b	3b	"Thinking Cap Trap"	Sean Roche	September 23, 1989
Simon is frustrated being the smartest member of the family. He invents a cap that helps Dave and his brothers become smarter. Simon is so confident with his family's new intellects that he signs them up to be on a genius game show. But before he can give his family another boost of the thinking cap, he loses it. Song: Calculate
80a	4a	"Bye, George"	Alicia Marie Schudt	September 30, 1989
Alvin is in danger of failing his American History class unless he can pass a test on the American Revolution. He thinks he can get an easy A by using Simon's time machine to go to Revolutionary War battles, but a mishap instead causes George Washington to be brought to the 20th Century. Through getting to know General Washington and introducing him to modern technology, the boys learn that Washington is disheartened from suffering defeat after defeat and is reluctant to return to his proper time as he is now questioning his contribution, which could result in problems for all Americans if history changes. Song: Time Warp Rap
80b	4b	"A Day in the Life"	Dianne Dixon	September 30, 1989
Simon makes a video of his family for his class project. Unfortunately for Dave and his brothers, he took the video in not their greatest moments, and are nervous when Simon's video will air on TV. Alvin, Dave and Theodore decide to resort to drastic action by breaking into the TV studio. Song: Coast Is Clear
81a	5a	"Like Father, Like Son"	Bruce Morris	October 7, 1989
Alvin is tired of being treated like a kid and trades place with Dave for a day to feel what it is like to be a grown-up, where he gets a prompt lesson in responsibility as the head of a household. Song: I Got the Power
81b	5b	"Dr. Simon and Mr. Heartthrob"	Duane Capizzi	October 7, 1989
Alvin accidentally tampers with Simon's hair growth formula and instead of having it grow Simon's hair, it turns him into a heartthrob. The new Simon charms all the ladies and threatens Alvin's status as a teen idol, but Simon ultimately learns what happens when he is not himself. Song: Yesterday and You
82a	6a	"Too Hip to Be Dave"	Dianne Dixon	October 14, 1989
Dave gets a bump on the head and forgets who he is. After seeing a commercial, Dave becomes a trendy stylish man. Because the amnesiac Dave does not recognize the Chipmunks, he feels no responsibility to be their guardian, and the Chipmunks must work to jog his memory. Songs: Hip and Happenin, The Chipmunk Song (Christmas Don't Be Late), and We're the Chipmunks
82b	6b	"Hearts and Flowers"	Dianne Dixon	October 14, 1989
The Chipettes are excited for the summer holidays, but not when Miss Miller keeps making other plans for them. The girls decide to hook her up with an elderly man by the name of Mr. Flowers. Song: Hello, Mr.Flowers
83a	7a	"Maltese Chipmunk"	Dianne Dixon & Ross Bagdasarian	October 21, 1989
Alvin has a dream that he is a detective from the 1940s. He is on a case to find Brittany, a rich woman who has vanished without explanation, and Dave plays a police lieutenant who thinks the detective Alvin is nothing but a troublemaker. Song: Follow the Clue and Britanny's Vamp
83b	7b	"Dear Diary"	Alicia Marie Schudt	October 21, 1989
The Chipettes discover the joys of writing in a diary. Tension builds between them when they each deliberately sneak a peak at what the other Chipettes has written. Song: Dear Diary
84a	8a	"Unfair Science"	Ross Bagdasarian	October 28, 1989
All three boys find themselves having a crush on the science substitute teacher. In order to impress her, they each make a project for the science fair. Song: Put On Your Tappin' Shoes
84b	8b	"Shaking the Family Tree"	Denice Ferguson	October 28, 1989
The Chipmunks decide to have a family reunion with their aunts and uncle, but things are not well between them. Each Chipmunk finds out that the three of them have issues and believes many years ago each of them tried to sabotage the other in their chosen careers. Song: Family Tree
85a	9a	"Inner Dave"	Alicia Marie Schudt	November 11, 1989
The boys are accidentally shrunk by one of Simon's inventions. They end up going inside Dave's head in order to try telling him what happened. Song: Sing Calypso
85b	9b	"The Legend of Sleeping Brittany"	Sean Roche	November 11, 1989
The Chipmunks and Chipettes participate in the school journalism class. They end up covering the story of "Sleeping Beauty". During the investigation, Brittany pricks her finger on the spinning wheel and becomes cursed, just like the real story. Song: Wake Up Little Susie
86a	10a	"Three Chipmunks and a Puppy"	Ross Bagdasarian, Cynthia Friedlob & John Semper	November 25, 1989
The boys are fed up with their puppy's antics and set out to train Lilly to behave. But soon the Chipmunks feel they are not qualified to raise her and they give her away, only to regret their chance when Dave tells them of times he had to learn patience with their antics during their younger years. Song: Hound Dog
86b	10b	"Phantom of the Rock Opera"	Duane Capizzi	November 25, 1989
The Chipmunks participate in an opera which they learned has been subject to problems. When they learn a janitor was denied a chance to star on stage, the boys work to get him his deserved chance. Songs: Bombingo Mio, Opera Opening, Potato Potahto, Thunder and Lightning, Star of the Show, and Lance the Knife
87a	11a	"The Return of Uncle Adventure"	Duane Capizzi & Janice Karman	December 2, 1989
While performing on a cruise ship for old folks, The Chipmunks Uncle Willy makes a surprise visit. This time to take the boys on a trip to the fountain of youth where they end up getting captured heading face to face with the legendary "babymen". Song: La Bamba
87b	11b	"The Princess and the Pig"	Janice Karman	December 2, 1989
To Make up For school credit, Brittany must spend 2 weeks working at a farm where she reluctantly befriends a pet pig named Lawrence. Song: Country Feelin
88	12	"Alvin in Neverland"	Dianne Dixon, Ross Bagdasarian & Janice Karman	December 9, 1989
A girl rejects Alvin because he is too childish. Therefore, Alvin decides to go prematurely adult, and only do grown-up things – and he forces his brothers to do the same. But by reading him the story of Peter Pan, Dave makes Alvin understand what a wonderful adventure childhood can be. Songs: Oh, Boy!, and Unsavory Things (a My Favorite Things parody/remix)
89	13	"Merry Christmas, Mr. Carroll"	Dianne Dixon	December 16, 1989
Alvin, as usual, is thinking of himself when it comes to Christmas. He is so focused on receiving presents that he fails to think of poor Mr. Carroll, who just wants his morning paper. He is then taught a lesson in an homage to A Christmas Carol. Songs: The Chipmunk Song (Christmas Don't Be Late), and Here Comes Christmas

=== Season 8: The Chipmunks Go to the Movies (1990) ===
This was a retool of the series and parodied many movies from its era.

No. overall	No. in season	Title	Written by	Original release date
90	1	"Back to Our Future"	Dianne Dixon	September 8, 1990
The Alvin, Simon, and Theodore from the 1990s meet their "Alvin Show" counterparts. Parody: Back to the Future Songs: Back in Time and The Alvin Twist
91	2	"Bigger"	Dianne Dixon	September 15, 1990
Alvin wishes he was bigger so he would not be treated as a child all the time. His wish comes true overnight and now he has to learn to live life as an adult. Parody: Big Songs: I Wanna Be Big, I Love Rock 'n' Roll and The Girls of Rock 'n' Roll
92	3	"Kong!"	Dianne Dixon	September 22, 1990
Buster Bardom (Alvin), a famous Broadway producer meets a large ape named Kong. The only way Buster can convince Kong to come back to America with him is if Kiki (Theodore), Kong's best friend, and Nola (Brittany), a famous and beautiful actress go with him. Parody: King Kong Songs: What'd I Say and "I Feel Good"
93	4	"Batmunk"	Bruce Morris & William J. Thutt	September 29, 1990
The Chipmunks watch Theodore's favorite movie "Batmunk," where Simon plays the role of Batmunk/Brice Wayne. A string of crimes happen, and all the Batmunk toys are being stolen. There could only be one criminal mad enough to commit this terrible crime-the Jokester (Alvin). Parody: Batman Song: "Danger Zone"
94	5	"Daytona Jones and the Pearl of Wisdom"	Bob Carrau & Dianne Dixon	October 6, 1990
Daytona Jones (Alvin) along with his brother, Saratoga (Simon), are off to find the Pearl of Wisdom. Parody: The Indiana Jones franchise Songs: "Chinatown" and "Good Thing" (replaced by Good Grief in UK airing)
95	6	"Star Wreck: The Absolutely Final Frontier"	Ralph Sanchez	October 13, 1990
Responding to a distress call, the crew of the USS Booby Prize encounters a dangerous alien race that wishes everything in the entire galaxy was exactly the same. Parody: The Star Trek franchise Songs: "Bad Moon Rising" and "Red Alert"
96	7	"Robomunk"	Sean Roche	October 20, 1990
Officer Malone (Alvin) suffers a terrible accident and thanks to Dr. Simonize (Simon), he is now half-robot and half-chipmunk. Parody: RoboCop Songs: Hero and Hangin' Tough (replaced by The 'C' Team on video.) Only the last note of Hangin' Tough can be heard on video.
97	8	"S.T. The Space Traveler"	Dianne Dixon	October 27, 1990
The boys meet an alien, and they try to hide him from a pair of scientists who wish to capture the alien and do experiments on him. Parody: E.T. the Extra-Terrestrial Songs: Workin' for a Livin' and Somebody Rescue Me
98	9	"Irrational Buffoon's European Vacation"	Jack Enyart	November 3, 1990
After winning first prize on "America's Most Embarrassing Home Videos", Clark Sevillewald (Dave) and the boys get to go to Wacky World in Europe. Parody: National Lampoon's European Vacation Songs: The Wanderer and I Wish I Could Speak French
99	10	"Chip Tracy"	Dianne Dixon & Jack Enyart	November 10, 1990
Chip Tracy (Alvin) is going up against serious criminals that are plaguing the city. Parody: Dick Tracy Songs: Clothes Make the Man and Real Wild Child
100	11	"Gremlionis"	Bob Carrau	November 17, 1990
The Chipmunks go up against a bunch of ancient gremlins that originated from Italy. Parody: Gremlins Songs: Gremlionis and Rebel Yell
101	12	"Sploosh"	Dianne Dixon	November 24, 1990
A scientist's assistant named Trusty (Simon) meets the mermaid Princess Montana (Jeanette), but his boss Dr. Bubbles finds out. Montana is then captured by the fame-hungry scientist who plans to reveal her to the world on a popular talk show. Parody: Splash Song: Oh, Pretty Woman
102	13	"Funny, We Shrunk the Adults"	Bob Carrau	December 1, 1990
Thanks to one of Simon's inventions, Dave and Zelda (Miss Miller) are accidentally shrunk, leaving the Chipmunks and the new neighborhood kids – Deena and her brothers; Tariq and Ali – to create chaos around the house. Parody: Honey, I Shrunk the Kids Songs: Short People and Coming up Short
