= The Mexican (song) =

1972 song by Baby Ruth

Song by Babe Ruth

from the album First Base
- Released: November 1972
- Recorded: 1972, Abbey Road Studios
- Length: 5:45
- Label: Harvest (EMI)
- Songwriters: Alan Shacklock; Ennio Morricone ("Per Qualche Dollaro in Piu")
- Producers: Alan Shacklock, Nick Mobbs

"The Mexican"

Single by Jellybean

from the album Wotupski!?!
- Released: 1984
- Songwriters: Alan Shacklock; Ennio Morricone ("Per Qualche Dollaro in Piu")
- Producer: John "Jellybean" Benitez

Jellybean singles chronology
"The Mexican" (1984)	"Sidewalk Talk" (1984)

"The Mexican" is a song by English rock band Babe Ruth, from their debut album First Base.

The song has been compiled, covered, remixed, and sampled many times, and is considered one of the most influential songs in hip hop music culture, as well as being popular in early disco clubs such as The Loft.

The song was written by Alan Shacklock and recorded along with the rest of the First Base album at Abbey Road Studios in the summer of 1972. Shacklock wrote the lyrics of the song as a retort to the 1960 John Wayne film The Alamo, which was full of historical inaccuracies and did not show the human side of the Mexican troops who defeated the Texian forces at the Battle of the Alamo. The song has a driving drum beat and funky bass and shows Shacklock's fondness for African-American music and Wild West shoot outs.

The song composition interpolates "Per Qualche Dollaro in Più" by Ennio Morricone, from the soundtrack for the film For a Few Dollars More which was directed by Sergio Leone.

== Personnel ==
- Alan Shacklock – lead guitar
- Jenny Haan – lead vocals, castanets
- Dave Hewitt – bass guitar
- Dave Punshon – electric piano
- Dick Powell – drums

== Cover versions ==
- 1978: Bombers, a Montreal disco group
- 1983: Funky 4 + 1
- 1984: Jellybean with vocals by the original singer, Jenny Haan. Jellybean's debut single, this version went to number one on the US dance chart.
- 1999: Helloween, released on Metal Jukebox
- 2006: Marc Hype & Jim Dunloop featuring Sara Bourgeois
- 2015: Gza, member of the hip-hop group Wu-Tang Clan
- 2020: Stretch & Bobbito, the M19s Band featuring Mireya Ramos
- 2025: JID, VCRs (with Vince Staples)
