= Stealing Home (disambiguation) =

Stealing home most commonly refers to:

- Stolen base, a type of play in the game of baseball

Stealing Home or Stealin' Home may also refer to:

- Stealing Home (statue, a statue of Jackie Robinson outside Dodger Stadium
- Stealin' Home (Babe Ruth album), 1975
- Stealin' Home (Ian Matthews album), 1978
- Stealin' Home a 2002 album by Bob Snider
- Stealing Home, a 1988 movie starring Mark Harmon and Jodie Foster
- Stealing Home (2001 film), a 2001 documentary about Cuban baseball defectors
- "Stealing Home" (Cold Case episode), a season 6 episode of Cold Case
- "Stealing Home" (CSI: NY episode), a season 2 episode of CSI: NY
- "Stealing Home" (White Collar episode), a season 3 episode of White Collar
