= First Base (album) =

Studio album by Babe Ruth
- Released: November 1972
- Recorded: June–September 1972; EMI Studios, London
- Genres: Hard rock; progressive rock; art rock
- Length: 41:36
- Label: Harvest EMI (Capitol Records in the US)
- Producers: Alan Shacklock, Nick Mobbs

Babe Ruth chronology
First Base (1972)	Amar Caballero (1973)

Singles from First Base
- 1. "Wells Fargo" Released: November 3, 1972; 2. "The Mexican" Released: 1973

Professional ratings
Review scores
Source	Rating
AllMusic	4/5 stars
Christgau's Record Guide	C+
Creem	B−
The Rolling Stone Record Guide	2/5 stars

First Base is the debut album by English rock band Babe Ruth. Produced by guitarist Alan Shacklock and Nick Mobbs, and engineered by Tony Clark at the EMI's Abbey Road Studios between June and September 1972, it was released November that year.

The album track "Wells Fargo" — a hard rock song named after the cash-transporting stagecoach line of the American Old West, with lyrics evoking the era's cowboy legend — was released as a single and became an FM radio hit.

The album went gold in Canada (#87), sold well in the US, but by comparison had disappointing sales in the UK. The song "The Mexican" has been covered and remixed many times. The 1984 cover version by John "Jellybean" Benitez featured vocals by Janita Haan. "The Mexican" was also mixed into the third track of The Dirtchamber Sessions Volume One by Liam Howlett of The Prodigy in 1999 and covered by GZA in 2015.

The sleeve design, painting and photography were by Roger Dean.

== Track listing ==
1. "Wells Fargo" (Alan Shacklock) – 6:14
2. "The Runaways" (music: Alan Shacklock, words: David Whiting) – 7:12
3. "King Kong" (Frank Zappa) – 6:40, recorded in one take, no overdubs
4. "Black Dog" (Jesse Winchester) – 8:03
5. "The Mexican" (Alan Shacklock) – 5:48 - interpolates Per Qualche Dollaro in Piu (For a Few Dollars More, music by Ennio Morricone)
6. "Joker" (Alan Shacklock) – 7:42
7. "Wells Fargo" (single version, CD only; Shacklock) – 3:35
8. "Theme from For a Few Dollars More" (CD only; Morricone) – 2:19

== Personnel ==
Babe Ruth

- Janita "Jennie" Haan - vocals, castanets on "The Mexican"
- Alan Shacklock - acoustic and electric guitars, Hammond organ, percussion, vocals
- Dave Hewitt - bass guitar
- Dave Punshon - electric piano, keyboards
- Dick Powell - drums, percussion

Other musicians

- Gasper Lawal - conga, bongo, cabasa
- Brent Carter - saxophone
- Harry Mier - oboe
- Peter Halling - cello - Leader
- Clive Anstee - cello
- Manny Fox - cello
- Boris Rickleman - cello
- Jeff Allen - drums on "The Runaways"

== Charts ==
Chart (1972)	Peak position
Canada Top Albums/CDs (RPM)	87
US Billboard 200	178

== Releases ==
- 1972: LP US/Canada, Harvest SW-11151
- 1972: LP UK, Harvest SHSP 4022
- 1972: LP Spain, EMI/Harvest 1J 062-05.159
- 1972: LP Italy, EMI/Harvest 3C 064-05159
- 1972: LP Japan, Odeon
- 1991: CD Canada, One Way 57343
- 1995: CD Germany, Repertoire REP 4554-WP
- 2001: CD Repertoire REP4554
