= The Real Thing (Jellybean song) =

Single by Jellybean featuring Steven Dante

from the album Just Visiting This Planet
- B-side: "The Real Thing (Acapella Mix)"
- Released: 1987 (UK); November 1987 (US)
- Genre: House
- Length: 4:35 (single); 7:42 (remix)
- Label: Chrysalis
- Songwriters: Arnold Roman, Antoinette Colandreo
- Producer: John "Jellybean" Benitez

Jellybean singles chronology
"Sidewalk Talk" (1986)	"The Real Thing" (1987)	"Who Found Who" (1987)

"The Real Thing" is a 1987 hit single by music producer Jellybean, which features the vocals of Steven Dante. It is featured on Jellybean's album Just Visiting This Planet. The song was most successful in clubs at the time, reaching #1 in the US Hot Dance Club Play Chart for one week. "The Real Thing" also peaked at #49 and #82 on the soul chart and Hot 100, respectively. Overseas, the single was successful in the UK Singles Chart, reaching #13.

== Charts ==
Chart (1987)	Peak position
U.S. Billboard Hot 100	82
U.S. Billboard Hot Black Singles	49
UK Singles Chart	13
U.S. Hot Dance Club Play	1
