= UK Dance Singles and Albums Charts =

UK record chart

The Dance Singles Chart and the Dance Albums Chart are music charts compiled in the United Kingdom by the Official Charts Company from sales of songs in the dance music genre (e.g. house, trance, drum and bass, garage, synth-pop) in record stores and digital downloads The chart can be viewed on the BBC Radio 1's and Official Charts Company's website.

From 1981 the Media Research Information Bureau compiled a disco and dance chart that was published in several music weeklies. The trade publication Music Week started compiling a dance chart from Gallup data in the mid-1980s. In 1990 the publishers of Music Week, together with the BBC and a retailer consortium, formed the Chart Information Network (later to become the Official Charts Company). It began compiling the chart in 1990.

The archive on the Official Charts Company website goes back to 3 July 1994. The dates listed in the menus below represent the Saturday after the Sunday the chart was announced, as the dates are given in chart publications such as the ones produced by Billboard, Guinness, and Virgin. Digital downloads became eligible on the Dance Singles and Albums Charts in June 2009. Prior to that, only vinyl and CD sales were compiled into the chart.

The Dance Singles and Albums Charts contain 40 positions.

== Media Research Information Bureau charts ==
- List of UK Dance Singles Chart number ones of 1987
- List of UK Dance Singles Chart number ones of 1988

== See also ==
- Lists of UK Dance Singles Chart number ones
- Lists of UK Dance Albums Chart number ones
