= List of UK Dance Singles Chart number ones of 1988 =

This is a list of the songs which reached number one on the UK Dance Singles Chart in 1988, according to the MRIB.

Issue date	Song	Artist	Duration
2 January	"The Way You Make Me Feel"	Michael Jackson	2 Weeks
16 January	"Come into My Life"	Joyce Sims	4 weeks
13 February	"When Will I Be Famous"	Bros	1 week
20 February	"Tell It to My Heart"	Taylor Dayne	1 week
27 February	"Beat Dis"	Bomb The Bass	3 weeks
19 March	"I Know You Got Soul"	Eric B. & Rakim	2 weeks
2 April	"Don't Turn Around"	Aswad	2 weeks
16 April	"Pink Cadillac"	Natalie Cole	2 weeks
30 April	"Theme from S'Express"	S'Express	3 weeks
21 May	"Blue Monday 1988"	New Order	1 week
28 May	"Check This Out"	L.A. Mix	3 weeks
18 June	"Doctorin' the Tardis"	The Timelords	2 weeks
2 July	"Roses Are Red"	The Mac Band	2 weeks
16 July	"Push It"	Salt-n-Pepa	3 weeks
6 August	"Superfly Guy"	S'Express	1 week
13 August	"The Only Way Is Up"	Yazz & The Plastic Population	4 weeks
10 September	"Big Fun"	Inner City	6 weeks
22 October	"We Call It Acieed"	D Mob	3 weeks
12 November	"Can You Party"	Royal House	1 week
19 November	"Girl You Know It's True"	Milli Vanilli	1 week
26 November	"Stand Up for Your Love Rights"	Yazz	1 week
3 December	"Stakker Humanoid"	Humanoid	2 weeks
17 December	"Good Life"	Inner City	4 weeks
