= John Benitez =

American musician and producer (born 1957)

- Also known as: Jellybean
- Born: November 7, 1957 (age 69); New York City, U.S.
- Genres: Freestyle; electro; house; film score
- Occupations: Songwriter; musician; producer
- Instrument: Guitar
- Years active: 1976–present
- Labels: Jellybean Music Group; Chrysalis/EMI Records; EMI Records

John Benitez (born November 7, 1957), also known as Jellybean, is an American musician, songwriter, DJ, remixer, and music producer. He has produced and remixed artists such as Madonna, Whitney Houston, Michael Jackson and the Pointer Sisters. He was later the executive producer of Studio 54 Radio. In December 2016, Billboard magazine ranked him as the 99th most successful dance artist of all-time.

== Early life ==
Benitez was born in the South Bronx neighborhood of New York City, the son of Puerto Rican parents. After his parents divorced, Benitez and his younger sister Debbie were raised by their mother, who worked in the executive offices of Sloan's supermarkets. Benitez grew up enjoying music and would watch deejays at local clubs. Benitez borrowed his sister's record player and practiced on two turntables. His sister nicknamed him Jellybean as his initials are J.B. and from the expression "Know what I mean, Jellybean?", he said. Benitez attended De Witt Clinton High School and John F. Kennedy High School, but did not graduate. He would skip school and play at hooky parties. When a neighbor paid him to play at a Sweet 16 party, he realized he could have a career as a deejay.

== Career ==
In 1976, Benitez got a weekend job deejaying between salsa bands at a club called Charlie's in the Bronx. He convinced the owner to open a non-alcoholic dance club, and he used the live audience to experiment on. By this time, he was kicked out of school for truancy. Benitez wanted to move to Manhattan, so he worked at a club called La Mariposa in Washington Heights. Then he switched to the Experimental Four club in Midtown Manhattan.

In 1978, Benitez was making $100 for a four-night week when he moved to an apartment on the West Side of Manhattan. After earning a high school equivalency diploma, Benitez enrolled at Bronx Community College as a psychology major and took voice and diction classes. In 1979, Benitez worked back and forth between Manhattan and Long Island. He worked seven nights a week at Hurrah, Les Mouches in New York City, Club Marrakesh in Westhampton, Blue Cloud in Southampton, and La Falafel. Between 1976 and 1980, Benitez also played at New York New York, Studio 54, Le Jardin, and the Grand Ballroom. He eventually settled at the Electric Circus and Xenon in New York City. In 1981, he was hired as the resident DJ at Funhouse. He hosted a weekend dance radio show at WKTU. Soon, Benitez was influencing the dance charts. He pushed the records "Planet Rock" (1982) and "Let the Music Play" (1983). Record companies would send him awards when the records went gold.

In 1983, an executive from Warner Bros. Records introduced Benitez to Madonna at the Funhouse. At the time she had released one single, "Everybody" (1982), which he played at the club. They became friends and Madonna asked Benitez to remix her 1983 debut album Madonna; soon after a romance ensued. Benitez remixed her singles "Burning Up", "Borderline", and "Lucky Star". He also produced "Holiday", which was her first international top ten hit song. "While I was launching her career, I was launching my career as a producer," he said. Benitez continued to deejay at the Funhouse while producing and remixing for other artists. In 1984, Benitez remixed Madonna's hit song "Like a Virgin" and landed a producing deal with EMI America Records. In May 1985, Steve Rubell and Ian Schrager opened the Palladium in New York City. They asked Benitez to play at the grand opening and be a resident deejay at the club. After Benitez's production of Madonna's song "Crazy for You" went No. 1 the same week, Rubell decided that Benitez has become "more of a commercial-record producer than a cutting-edge spinner" and decided to replace him.

Benitez remixed songs for various artists, including for Paul McCartney, Michael Jackson, Billy Joel, David Bowie, Sting, Talking Heads, Deniece Williams, Elvis Costello, Irene Cara, Fleetwood Mac, the Pointer Sisters, Maria Vidal, Michael Sembello and ZZ Top. At the peak of his success, Dave Rimmer of Smash Hits called him "a veritable Bishop of the Beat, Deacon of the Drum Machine and...High Priest of the Handclap".

In 1985, Benitez signed a production deal with Warner Bros. Records. When Warner Bros. asked Benitez to produce a non-rap song for the Krush Groove soundtrack, he suggested Debbie Harry, who was resurrecting her career. They composed the song "Feel the Spin" (1985) together. Benitez produced Whitney Houston's top ten hit "Love Will Save the Day" from her 1987 sophomore album Whitney. Benitez was the musical producer for the film The Principal (1987) and produced the theme for Mel Brooks's film Spaceballs (1987).

Benitez had success with his own records as well. Between 1984 and 1991, he had nine recordings placed in the top ten of the U.S. Hot Dance Music/Club Play chart, including three number ones. Benitez released his debut album Wotupski!?! on EMI America in 1984. His 1984 cover of Babe Ruth's "The Mexican", for which he recruited original singer Janita Haan, regarded as a pivotal moment in the electro-hip hop underground scene, and was his first number-one single on the Hot Dance Music/Club Play chart. His single "Sidewalk Talk" (US No. 18, UK No. 47) was written by Madonna and became a top 20 hit, which made him the first DJ to appear on the pop chart as an artist. Four singles from his 1987 album Just Visiting This Planet reached the top 20 in the UK. The 1987 track "Who Found Who" (US No. 16) features Elisa Fiorillo. In 1991, the album Spillin' the Beans saw Benitez work with John Oates, Roy Ayers and Roy Hay. The single "What's It Going To Be" featured Niki Haris, one of three main vocalists on the album together with Cindy Valentine and Deanna Eve. The album received mixed reviews with Ian Cranna in Q Magazine calling it "functional but forgettable". Other vocalists who have performed on a Jellybean release include Adele Bertei and Richard Darbyshire.

In 1995, Benitez launched an independent Latin label, H.O.L.A. Recordings (Home Of Latin Artists), which was backed by Wasserstein Perella and PolyGram Records. Benitez also composed the film score for the 1995 independent comedy Lie Down With Dogs.

After not playing anywhere for a decade, David Mancuso invited Benitez to deejay at The Loft in New York City in 2001. Benitez continues to deejay globally. He owns Jellybean Productions, Jellybean Soul and Jellybean Music Group. In 1995, he founded the now-defunct H.O.L.A. recording label (Home of Latin Artists) which developed hip hop and R&B music by bilingual artists and released recordings in both English and Spanish. Voices of Theory signed with this label. In 2005, Benitez was inducted into the Dance Music Hall of Fame.

Benitez is currently the executive producer of Studio 54 Radio, which is heard exclusively on SiriusXM Satellite Radio (Channel 54). Studio 54 Radio launched in 2011. It features 1970s and 1980s classic dance from Jellybean's personal collection and the vaults and collections of Studio 54 insiders.

== Personal life ==
Benitez dated Madonna and model Nikki Scorsese in the 1980s. He married former Wilhelmina model and restaurateur Carolyn Effer in 1991. They have two daughters, Layla Benitez and Reya Benitez. They lived in the Gramercy Park neighborhood of Manhattan.

== Partial discography ==
=== Albums ===
Year	Album	Peak chart positions		Certifications	Record label
Year	Album	US	UK	Certifications	Record label
1984	Wotupski!?!	―	―		EMI America
1987	Just Visiting This Planet	101	15	BPI: Gold	Chrysalis
1988	Jellybean Rocks the House	―	16	BPI: Silver	Chrysalis
1991	Spillin' the Beans	―	―		Atlantic
2010	A Celebration in Sound	―	―		Jellybean Soul
"—" denotes releases that did not chart or were not released in that territory.

=== Singles ===
Year	Single	Peak positions										Album
Year	Single	US	US R&B	US Dance	NZ	NED	BEL (FLA)	GER	SWI	IRE	UK	Album
1984	"The Mexican"	—	—	1	—	—	—	—	—	—	—	Wotupski!?!
1984	"Sidewalk Talk"	18	51	1	34	31	—	—	—	—	47	Wotupski!?!
1987	"Who Found Who" (featuring Elisa Fiorillo)	16	—	3	46	95	—	—	—	21	10	Just Visiting This Planet
1987	"The Real Thing" (featuring Steven Dante)	82	49	1	—	22	33	—	—	21	13	Just Visiting This Planet
1987	"Jingo"	—	—	2	—	16	16	44	18	19	12	Just Visiting This Planet
1988	"Just a Mirage" (featuring Adele Bertei)	—	—	4	—	87	—	—	—	27	13	Just Visiting This Planet
1988	"Coming Back for More" (featuring Richard Darbyshire)	—	—	9	50	—	—	—	—	—	41	Jellybean Rocks the House!
1991	"What's It Gonna Be" (featuring Niki Haris)	90	—	2	—	—	—	—	—	—	98	Spillin' the Beans
1991	"Spillin' the Beans"	—	—	5	—	—	—	—	—	—	—	Spillin' the Beans
2006	"New York House" (featuring Marlon D.)	—	—	—	—	—	—	—	—	—	—	Singles only
2008	"Secrets & Lies" (featuring Carla Prather) (promo only)	—	—	—	—	—	—	—	—	—	—	Singles only
2009	"You Bring Me Joy" (featuring Su Su Bobien) (promo only)	—	—	—	—	—	—	—	—	—	—	A Celebration in Sound (as "3 Amigos" with Marlon D. & Mena Keys)
"—" denotes releases that did not chart or were not released.

=== Production ===
- B-Movie "A Letter from Afar"
- Debbie Gibson "One Step Ahead"
- Debbie Harry "Feel the Spin"
- E. G. Daily "Say It, Say It"
- Hot Streak "Body Work"
- La India "Dancing on the Fire"
- Madonna "Borderline"
- Madonna "Crazy for You"
- Madonna "Holiday"
- Madonna "Gambler"
- Madonna "Warning Signs"
- Madonna "Working My Fingers to the Bone"
- Marc Anthony "Parece Mentira"
- Ruben Blades Y Seis Del Solar "Move On (Muévete)"
- Rozalla "I Love Music"
- Sheena Easton "If It's Meant to Last"
- Siedah Garrett "Do You Want It Right Now"
- Stacy Lattisaw "Nail It to the Wall"
- Whitney Houston "Love Will Save the Day"

=== Selected remixes ===
- Afrika Bambaataa & the Soulsonic Force "Planet Rock"
- Agent Sumo "Why?"
- A-ha "Cry Wolf"
- A-ha "I've Been Losing You"
- Alphaville "Jet Set"
- Barbra Streisand "Emotion"
- Bandolero "Paris Latino"
- The Bangles "Walk Like an Egyptian"
- Ana "Shy Boys"
- Billy Idol "Eyes Without a Face"
- Billy Idol "Flesh for Fantasy"
- Billy Joel "Tell Her About It"
- Bonnie Tyler "Holding Out for a Hero"
- Boogie Box High "Jive Talkin'"
- Breakfast Club "Right on Track"
- Cher "A Different Kind of Love Song"
- Cher "Believe"
- Cyndi Lauper "Girls Just Want to Have Fun"
- Dan Hartman "I Can Dream About You"
- David Bowie "Blue Jean"
- DeBarge "Rhythm of the Night"
- Debbie Gibson "Anything Is Possible"
- Deniece Williams "Let's Hear It for the Boy"
- Donna Summer "Eyes"
- Donna Summer "I'm Free"
- Duran Duran "Too Much Information"
- Earth, Wind & Fire "Magnetic"
- Eddie Money "Club Michelle"
- E.G. Daily "Love in the Shadows"
- Elvis Costello & the Attractions "Everyday I Write the Book"
- English Beat "I Confess"
- Eurythmics "Cool Blue"
- Eurythmics "Paint a Rumour"
- Fleetwood Mac "Everywhere"
- Fleetwood Mac "Little Lies"
- Fleetwood Mac "Seven Wonders"
- Frank Stalone "Far from Over"
- Freeez "I.O.U."
- General Public "Tenderness"
- George Benson "20/20"
- Gregory Hines "That Girl Wants to Dance with Me"
- Hall & Oates "Adult Education"
- Hall & Oates "Say It Isn't So"
- Hall & Oates "Talking All Night"
- Huey Lewis and the News "Back in Time"
- Huey Lewis and the News "The Power of Love"
- Huey Lewis and the News "Heart and Soul"
- Irene Cara "Flashdance... What a Feeling"
- Irene Cara "Why Me? (Irene Cara song)"
- James Ingram & Michael McDonald "Ya Mo B There"
- James Ingram "It's Your Night"
- Jermaine Jackson "Do You Remember Me?"
- Jermaine Jackson "Dynamite"
- Jessica Simpson "A Public Affair"
- Joe Jackson "You Can't Get What You Want (Till You Know What You Want)"
- Jose Feliciano "Feliz Navidad (song)"
- Julio Iglesias "Agua Dulce, Agua Sala"
- Kenny Loggins "Playing with the Boys"
- Kim Carnes "Invisible Hands (song)"
- Lindsay Buckingham "Slow Dancing"
- Madonna "Borderline"
- Madonna "Burning Up"
- Madonna "Dress You Up"
- Madonna "Gambler"
- Madonna "Holiday"
- Madonna "Like a Virgin"
- Madonna "Lucky Star"
- Madonna "Material Girl"
- Madonna "Physical Attraction"
- Madonna "Spotlight"
- Maria Vidal "Body Rock"
- Martika "More Than You Know"
- Michael Sembello "Maniac"
- Melissa Manchester "Thief of Hearts"
- Naked Eyes "Always Something There To Remind Me"
- Naked Eyes "Promises Promises"
- New Order "Confusion"
- Nona Hendryx "B-Boys"
- Ollie & Jerry "Breakin'... There's No Stopping Us"
- Ollie & Jerry "Electric Boogaloo"
- Olivia Newton-John "Toughen Up"
- Pat Benatar "Invincible (Theme From The Legend Of Billie Jean)"
- Pat Benatar "Love Is a Battlefield"
- Paul McCartney "Ode to a Koala Bear"
- Paul McCartney "So Bad"
- Paul McCartney & Michael Jackson "Say Say Say"
- Paul McCartney & Michael Jackson "The Man"
- Peter Tosh "Johnny B. Goode"
- The Pointer Sisters "Automatic"
- The Pointer Sisters "Jump (for My Love)"
- Rockers Revenge "Walking on Sunshine"
- The Romantics "One in a Million"
- The Romantics "Talking In Your Sleep"
- Santana "Say It Again"
- Shakira "Objection"
- Shalamar "Dancing in the Sheets"
- Shalamar "Deadline USA"
- Sting "If You Love Somebody Set Them Free"
- Talking Heads "Making Flippy Floppy"
- Talking Heads "(Nothing But) Flowers"
- Talking Heads "Slippery People"
- Taylor Dayne "Original Sin"
- Teena Marie "Lead Me On"
- USA for Africa "We Are the World"
- Voices of Theory "Say It"
- Wang Chung "Everybody Have Fun Tonight"
- Whitney Houston "How Will I Know""
- Whitney Houston "I Wanna Dance with Somebody (Who Loves Me)"
- Whitney Houston "So Emotional"
- ZZ Top "Velcro Fly"

=== Motion picture / television ===
Benitez composed the theme song to Ricki Lake (1993 talk show) and The Charles Perez Show. He produced motion pictures and was nominated for a Golden Globe Award and an Emmy for his role as an Executive Producer for HBO's For Love or Country: The Arturo Sandoval Story starring Andy Garcia. He served as music supervisor and created and mixed tunes for many soundtracks.

=== Music supervisor ===
Among the motion pictures for which he served as Music Supervisor are:

- Allswell
- Carlito's Way
- Species
- Mi Vida Loca
- Get Carter
- The Shadow
- The Principal

=== Soundtrack works ===
Among the motion picture soundtracks for which he created and mixed tunes are:

- Back to the Future
- Back to the Future Part III
- Beat Street
- Breakin'
- Breakin' 2: Electric Boogaloo
- Call Me by Your Name
- Carlito's Way
- Charlie's Angels: Full Throttle
- Cheaper By The Dozen 2
- Clueless
- Dirty Dancing
- Dude, Where's My Car?
- El Cantante
- Flashdance
- Footloose
- Get Carter
- Hillbilly Elegy (film)
- Krush Groove
- Love, Simon
- Madonna: Truth or Dare
- Onward
- Police Academy 4: Citizens on Patrol
- Rain Man
- Reality Bites
- The Hangover
- The Muppets Take Manhattan
- The Shadow
- Snatch
- Spaceballs
- Species
- Staying Alive
- Superstar
- Top Gun
- Vision Quest
- Weird Science
- White Boy Rick

=== Television works ===
Among the television show soundtracks for which he created and mixed tunes are:

- American Horror Story
- Arrested Development
- Better Call Saul
- Beverly Hills, 90210
- Beavis and Butt-Head
- Black-ish
- Bless the Harts
- Doom Patrol
- Everybody Hates Chris
- Family Guy
- Fame (1982 TV series)
- Fresh Off the Boat
- GLOW (TV series)
- High Fidelity (TV series)
- Medium (TV series)
- Mixed-ish
- Modern Family
- Mr. Robot
- Narcos: Mexico
- One Day at a Time (2017 TV series)
- Orange is the New Black
- Parks and Recreation
- Pose (TV series)
- Ray Donovan
- Rupaul's Drag Race
- Sex and the City
- Shameless (American TV series)
- Snowfall (TV series)
- Stumptown (TV series)
- Stranger Things
- Succession (TV series)
- The Andy Warhol Diaries (TV series)
- The Americans
- The Boys (TV series)
- The Deuce (TV series)
- The Fall Guy
- The Flash (2014 TV series)
- The Goldbergs (2013 TV series)
- The Resident (TV series)
- The Simpsons
- This is Us
- Transparent (TV series)
- Will & Grace

== See also ==
- List of club DJs
- List of Puerto Ricans
- List of number-one dance hits (United States)
- List of artists who reached number one on the US Dance chart
- List of house music artists
