= Alvin and the Chipmunks (1983 TV series) =

American animated television series

- Also known as: The Chipmunks (seasons 6–7); The Chipmunks Go to the Movies (season 8)
- Genre: Comedy; Slapstick; Musical; Animated sitcom; Adventure
- Created by: Ross Bagdasarian Jr.; Janice Karman
- Based on: Alvin and the Chipmunks by: Ross Bagdasarian Sr.
- Written by: Ross Bagdasarian Jr.; Janice Karman; Various
- Directed by: Charles A. Nichols (seasons 1–5); Rudy Larriva (season 1); John Kimball (season 1); Kent Butterworth (season 6, eleven episodes); Bill Wolf (season 6, eleven episodes); Don Spencer (season 8)
- Voices of: Ross Bagdasarian Jr.; Janice Karman; Dody Goodman; Thomas H. Watkins; Frank Welker
- Theme music composer: Ross Bagdasarian; Janice Karman
- Composers: Dean Elliott (seasons 1–5); Thomas Chase (seasons 6–8); Stephen Rucker (seasons 6–8)
- Country of origin: United States
- Original language: English
- No. of seasons: 8
- No. of episodes: 102 (168 segments) (list of episodes)

Production
- Running time: 22 minutes (11 minutes per segment)
- Production companies: Bagdasarian Productions; Ruby-Spears Enterprises (seasons 1–5; season 6, eleven episodes); Murakami-Wolf-Swenson (season 6, eleven episodes); DIC Animation City (season 6, twelve episodes; seasons 7-8)

Original release
- Network: NBC
- Release: September 17, 1983 – December 1, 1990

Related
- The Alvin Show (1961–1962); The Chipmunk Adventure (1987); Alvinnn!!! and the Chipmunks (2015–2023)

Alvin and the Chipmunks is an American animated sitcom featuring the Chipmunks, which was produced by Ruby-Spears Enterprises (from 1983 to 1988) and DIC Enterprises (from 1988 to 1990) in association with Bagdasarian Productions.

Much of the overseas animation was done by Hanho Heung-Up for seasons 2-5. Season 6 episodes were animated by A-1 Productions. The last two seasons were animated by Sei Young Animation.

The show aired from September 17, 1983, to December 1, 1990, on NBC and is the follow-up to the original 1961–1962 series, The Alvin Show. The show introduced the Chipettes, three female Chipmunks with their female caretaker, Miss Beatrice Miller (who joined the cast in 1986). In 1988, the show switched production companies to DIC Enterprises and the series was renamed to The Chipmunks; the sixth season was co-produced by Murakami-Wolf-Swenson.

In 1987, during the show's fifth season, the Chipmunks' first animated feature film, The Chipmunk Adventure, was released in cinemas by The Samuel Goldwyn Company. The film was directed by Janice Karman and featured the Chipmunks and Chipettes in a contest traveling around the world.

In the show's eighth and final season, the show's name was changed to The Chipmunks Go to the Movies. Each episode was a spoof of a Hollywood, film like Back to the Future or King Kong. Several television specials featuring the characters were also released. In 1990, the special Rockin' Through the Decades was produced. That year, the Chipmunks also teamed up with other well-known cartoon characters (such as Bugs Bunny, Daffy Duck, Michelangelo, and Garfield) for the drug abuse-prevention special Cartoon All-Stars to the Rescue.

== Characters ==
- The Chipmunks: The main characters of the series
  - Alvin Seville: The oldest brother and leader of the Chipmunks, Alvin is the talented troublemaker trickster and leader of the group. He tends to start chaos and can be rather narcissistic at times, but he's actually sweet and golden-hearted at his core.
  - Simon Seville: The middle brother and tallest, Simon is the intelligent realist and the most responsible of the group. Season 1 was the only time he would wear his original black glasses with white lenses as he did in the 1960s TV show. Starting with season 2, Simon's glasses became blue with clear lenses, and so continued to be throughout the series. However, the original Simon with the black glasses can still be seen in the intro and title cards for seasons 1–5.
  - Theodore Seville: The youngest brother of the group, Theodore is the sensitive and lovable one of the group.
- The Chipettes: The Chipmunks' female counterparts and on-and-off girlfriends
  - Brittany Miller: The oldest sister and the leader of the Chipettes, Brittany is Alvin's counterpart. She is equally vain and sassy to Alvin, but like him, she loves her siblings very much.
  - Jeanette Miller: The middle sister and tallest, Jeanette is Simon's counterpart. However, unlike Simon, who is able to stand up to Alvin, she does not stand up to Brittany as easily. She is also very smart, which is what she does have in common with Simon. However, she is very shy and clumsy.
  - Eleanor Miller: The youngest sister, Eleanor is Theodore's counterpart. She shares his love for food and cooking, but she is more athletic, more intelligent, and more likely to stand up to Brittany than Theodore is to Alvin.
- David (Dave) Seville: The Chipmunks' adoptive father, the Chipettes' guardian, songwriter, and manager. Dave's patience is tested nearly every day by Alvin, usually to the point he shouts at him. He can get frustrated with Simon and Theodore too sometimes as Alvin often gets them into mischief, but regardless, he loves all of his boys equally.
- Miss Beatrice Miller: The kindly, absent-minded adoptive mother of the Chipettes who also sometimes takes care of the Chipmunks when Dave's away.
- Cookie Chomper III: The Chipmunks' first pet, Cookie Chomper III was a stray kitten who found his way into the Seville residence one night while Dave was working late. For a time, the Chipmunks kept him a secret from Dave until the kitten made his presence known. Dave allowed them to keep Cookie Chomper III, and he became their pet. But one evening, Cookie Chomper left through an open window in the Chipmunks' bedroom, then was hit by a car and killed. The Chipmunks all grieved, but Alvin was hurt most of all and even blamed himself. Dave reassured the boys that it wasn't their fault and helped them remember the happy times they had with Cookie Chomper III. Most NBC stations refused to air the episode due to its plot, although it was released on VHS in the UK.
- Lilly: The Chipmunks' puppy who they adopted from the shelter following the death of their original pet, Cookie Chomper III.
- Vinny: The Chipmunks' birth mother (originally voiced by June Foray, then by Janice Karman). The Chipmunks find their long-lost mother after days of searching. Alvin gets upset because he doesn't understand why she abandoned them. Their mother explains that the year she abandoned them there was a horrible winter and all of the animals in the forest were forced to leave their homes. She realized that they wouldn't survive the journey if she brought them with her, so she decided to leave them with a nice man who was always kind to the forest animals (Dave). She told them that when spring came and she could finally return to get them, she saw how happy they were with Dave, and thought they would be better off with him. Eventually, Alvin forgives his mother. They return to Dave, but the brothers agree to keep in touch with their mother. In a later episode, she and Dave clash on how to bring the boys up. Eventually, they make up.

== Voice cast ==
=== Main ===
- Ross Bagdasarian, Jr. as Alvin Seville, Simon Seville, Dave Seville, Grandpa Seville (second voice), Harry, most additional male voices (1988–1991)
- Janice Karman as Theodore Seville, Brittany Miller, Jeanette Miller, and Eleanor Miller, most additional female voices (1988–1991)
- Dody Goodman as Beatrice Miller
- Thomas H. Watkins as Uncle "Adventure" Willy, Lilly the dog (1988–1991)
- Rainy Hayes as Chipette Song vocal artist
- Sherwood Ball as Chipmunk Song vocal artist
- Vanessa Bagdasarian
- Michael Bagdasarian

=== Additional ===
- Michael Bell
- Mary Kay Bergman
- Derek Barton
- Julie Brown
- Booker Bradshaw
- Johnny Brown
- Natalie Brown
- Rodger Bumpass
- Arthur Burghardt
- Ruth Buzzi
- Nancy Cartwright
- Dan Castellaneta
- Philip Clarke
- David Coburn
- Henry Corden
- Peter Cullen
- Jim Cummings
- E.G. Daily
- Julie Dees
- Alan Dinehart
- Walker Edmiston
- Jack Enyart
- Al Fann
- Miriam Flynn
- Ron Feinberg
- June Foray
- Johnny Haymer
- Stanley Jones
- Maurice LaMarche
- Katie Leigh
- Barry Livingston
- Keye Luke
- Tress MacNeille - Museum Attendant, Missy Snootson ("My Pharaoh Lady")
- Kerrigan Mahan
- Gail Matthius
- Shep Menken
- Scott Menville
- Howard Morris
- Rob Paulsen
- Phil Proctor
- Clive Revill
- Rudy Ramos
- Robert Ridgely
- Ken Sansom
- Marilyn Schreffler
- Bill Scott
- Susan Silo
- Kath Soucie
- Amy Tunick
- Janet Waldo
- Eric Wallace
- B.J. Ward
- Frank Welker
- Alan Young
- Cameron Young

== Episodes ==
Season	Episodes	Originally released	
Season	Episodes	First released	Last released
1	13	September 17, 1983	December 10, 1983
2	13	September 8, 1984	December 1, 1984
3	10	September 14, 1985	November 16, 1985
4	8	September 13, 1986	November 1, 1986
5	8	September 12, 1987	October 31, 1987
6	24	September 10, 1988	February 18, 1989
7	13	September 9, 1989	December 16, 1989
8	13	September 8, 1990	December 1, 1990

=== Original network run ===
The series made its debut on September 17, 1983, on NBC, originally under the name Alvin and The Chipmunks, and was animated by Ruby-Spears Enterprises. Beginning with the 1988–89 season, the series was renamed to simply The Chipmunks, and production switched to Murakami-Wolf-Swenson (for 11 episodes of the 6th season) and DIC Enterprises (for 13 episodes of the 6th season, and for the 7th and 8th season) for the remainder of the series' run. For its final season in 1990, the series was renamed again, this time, The Chipmunks Go to the Movies, as all episodes in this season were spoofs of popular Hollywood movies.

=== Syndication package ===
The series went into syndication in the fall of 1988 under the original Alvin and The Chipmunks title, distributed by Lorimar-Telepictures (and later Warner Bros. Television after Warner Communications' purchase of Lorimar, Warner Bros. would later buy the pre-1991 library of Ruby-Spears in 1996 as part of its acquisition of Turner, where the library previously sat). The package contained all 52 episodes produced by Ruby-Spears (#901–952), as well as the Valentine's and Reunion specials. To round the package out to the common-practice syndication package length of 65 episodes (5 days a week for 13 weeks, allowing for exactly four cycles a year), an additional 11 episodes were produced specifically for the package by Murakami-Wolf-Swenson. In the syndication order, these episodes followed the 54 Ruby-Spears shows; in the fall 1988 cycle (September 12 – December 9), they aired from November 25 – December 9. Episodes were time-compressed (similar to a PAL speed-up) and/or trimmed in an effort to make room for more commercials. Telepictures began distributing the series in June 1985 for $30 Million, with the rights purchased for a record $385,000 a half-hour. The syndication package did not include the episodes that aired on NBC from season six onward, meaning that the final thirty-nine episodes of the series were not shown in reruns outside of the network.

The 65-episode syndication package was later carried by Nickelodeon and Cartoon Network in the United States. In Canada, the original run of the series was aired on the Global Television Network, while the package was later carried on YTV from 1994 until 2005 and later Teletoon Retro from October 1, 2007 until that channel's dissolution on September 1, 2015. After the dissolution of Teletoon Retro, the show hasn't aired on television in North America since then, but in the United States, the show hasn't been seen on U.S. television since Cartoon Network's last run of the series on May 31, 2002. The show also made it through French Canadian television, when TQS and later Super Écran began airing the series in 1991.

The syndication package was also carried overseas in the 1990s when it aired on Children's BBC, later Nickelodeon, and finally Channel 5's Milkshake! block in the United Kingdom. Elsewhere in Europe, the original run of the series was carried in France on Canal+ (while the syndication package of carried on France 3), Germany on Tele 5, and Italy on Italia 1. In Australia, the original run of the Ruby-Spears show aired on Network Ten, while the later episodes by Murakami-Wolf-Swenson and DiC were aired on ABC. The syndication package there was picked up on Nickelodeon for a short period of time. In Brazil, TV Globo aired the syndication package with Brazilian dubs. During that time, HIT Entertainment distributed the series outside North America.

== Music ==
"We're the Chipmunks"

Song by Alvin and the Chipmunks
- Recorded: 1983 (re-recorded 1987 and 2008)
- Studio: Bagdasarian Productions
- Length: 1:01 (TV Size); 2:58 (Remix Version)
- Label: Razor & Tie (2008); Rhino (2015)
- Songwriters: Ross Bagdasarian Jr. Janice Karman

"We're the Chipmunks" is a song performed by the fictional group Alvin and the Chipmunks. It serves as the theme song for their animated series in 1983 and 2015. A remixed version was recorded in 2008 for the Chipmunks' album Undeniable.
