= Stealin' Home (Babe Ruth album) =

Studio album by Babe Ruth
- Released: 1975
- Genre: Hard rock
- Label: Capitol
- Producer: Steve Rowland

Babe Ruth chronology
Babe Ruth (1975)	Stealin' Home (1975)	Kid's Stuff (1976)

Stealin' Home is the fourth album by the English band Babe Ruth, released in 1975. They supported it with a UK tour, although without vocalist Jenny Haan. The album peaked at No. 169 on the Billboard 200.

== Production ==
The album was produced by Steve Rowland. Its songs were written by the band, aside from "Can You Feel It". The guitar player Bernie Marsden joined prior to the recording sessions, replacing Alan Shacklock; Shacklock contributed by arranging the orchestral sections. "Elusive" incorporated elements of disco.

== Critical reception ==
Professional ratings
Review scores
Source	Rating
AllMusic	3/5 stars
The Encyclopedia of Popular Music	2/5 stars
The New Rolling Stone Record Guide	3/5 stars

The Statesville Record and Landmark said, "Hard rock is their métier, and when they get down to business, they really do rock." The Whig-Standard noted that "much of the music sounds like a cross somewhere between the old Jefferson Airplane ... and Suzie Quatro." The Huddersfield Daily Examiner opined that Babe Ruth "seem to be trying to spread [their power and intensity] over wider musical ground."

The Western Daily Press concluded that Stealin' Home is "more commercial than the band's first three albums and has had a few raucous edges smoothed out." The Evening Post praised "2000 Sunsets" but stated that the "star quality" is lacking. The Alcester Chroncile called the album "dirge-like and flat".

== Track listing ==
Side 1

1. "It'll Happen in Time"
2. "Winner Takes All"
3. "Fascination"
4. "2000 Sunsets"

Side 2

1. "Elusive"
2. "Can You Feel It"
3. "Say No More"
4. "Caught at the Plate"
5. "Tomorrow (Joining of the Day)"
