= Steven Dante =

British soul singer and songwriter

- Birth name: Steven Barrington Dennis
- Origin: United Kingdom
- Genres: Soul
- Years active: 1985–present
- Labels: Cooltempo

Steven Dante (stage name of Steven Barrington Dennis) is a British soul singer and songwriter, who had several singles released in the 1980s on the Cooltempo label. His only solo album, Find Out, was released on Chrysalis in 1988. It peaked at #87 in the UK Albums Chart in September 1988. He has also collaborated with several house producers, providing vocals for John "Jellybean" Benitez, D Mob and Lighthouse Family. "The Real Thing", released in 1987 with Jellybean, reached #13 on the UK Singles Chart, and was a US Billboard Hot Dance Club Play chart number-one single. It was included on Jellybean's album Just Visiting This Planet.

Dante also wrote songs for Total Contrast and By All Means, and sang backing vocals for Shara Nelson.

== Discography ==
=== Albums ===
Year	Album	UK
1988	Find Out	87

=== Singles ===
Year	Song	Label	UK
1985	"So Long"	Chrysalis	—
1986	"Give It Up for Love"	Cooltempo	78
1987	"The Real Thing" (with Jellybean)	Chrysalis	13
1987	"Why Can't You Sit Still"	Cooltempo	—
1988	"I'm Too Scared"	Cooltempo	34
1988	"Imagination"	Cooltempo	76
1989	"Love Follows"	Cooltempo	91
1997	"Never Had a Love Like This Before" (with Juliet Roberts)	Delirious	87
2010	"Ready or Not" (with Paul Hardcastle)		—
"—" denotes releases that did not chart or were not released in that territory.
