= Sidewalk Talk =

1984 single by Jellybean

Single by Jellybean

from the album Wotupski!?!
- B-side: "The Mexican"
- Released: October 21, 1984
- Recorded: 1984
- Genre: Synth-pop
- Length: 3:57 (single); 6:06 (album version)
- Label: EMI
- Songwriter: Madonna
- Producer: John "Jellybean" Benitez

Jellybean singles chronology
"The Mexican" (1984)	"Sidewalk Talk" (1984)	"Who Found Who" (1987)

"Sidewalk Talk" is a song by American record producer John "Jellybean" Benitez from his first extended play, Wotupski!?! (1984). It was released on October 21, 1984, by EMI Records as the first single from the EP. The song was written by Madonna and produced by Benitez. They had initially met in 1983 and Benitez worked as a producer on Madonna's self-titled debut album. When he started work on his debut EP, Wotupski!?!, Madonna wrote "Sidewalk Talk" for him. The song features bass and electric guitars, synthesizers, piano, and drums. Lead vocals are by Catherine Buchanan with additional chorus vocals by Madonna.

"Sidewalk Talk" received mixed reviews from critics, with David Nick Ybarra questioning Buchanan's credit as lead vocalist, instead of the better-known Madonna. The song was released initially in 12-inch promotional format to club DJs, and reached the top of the Billboard Hot Dance Club Songs chart. It was later released commercially in 7-inch and 12-inch formats, and charted on the Billboard Hot 100. The song also had minor chart placements in the Netherlands, New Zealand, and the United Kingdom.

== Background and composition ==
In 1983, Madonna met John "Jellybean" Benitez, who worked as a DJ at the Funhouse club in lower Manhattan. Soon, they started dating and working on her self-titled debut album. When Benitez started work on his debut EP, Wotupski!?!, he asked Madonna to write a song for him. Within two days Madonna wrote "Sidewalk Talk", whose idea she had initially thought of using on her debut album. According to Benitez, Wotupski!?! was a concept album: "It's a street slang in the Bronx. It means 'what's up, what's new?'" The artist credit of the song was simply Jellybean, with lead vocals credited to Catherine Buchanan. Madonna provided background vocals for the track with Audrey Wheeler and Cindy Mizelle. Benitez produced the track as well as arranging and mixing it. Michael Hutchinson assisted on engineering, recording, and mixing. Producer Stephen Bray also arranged "Sidewalk Talk" with Benitez. Instrumentation featured in the track included bass guitar by Marcus Miller, synthesizer by Boyd Jarvis, Fred Zarr, and Bray, electric guitar by Ira Siegel, percussion by Bashiri Johnson and Trevor Gale, and drum programming by Benitez and Bray.

== Release and reception ==
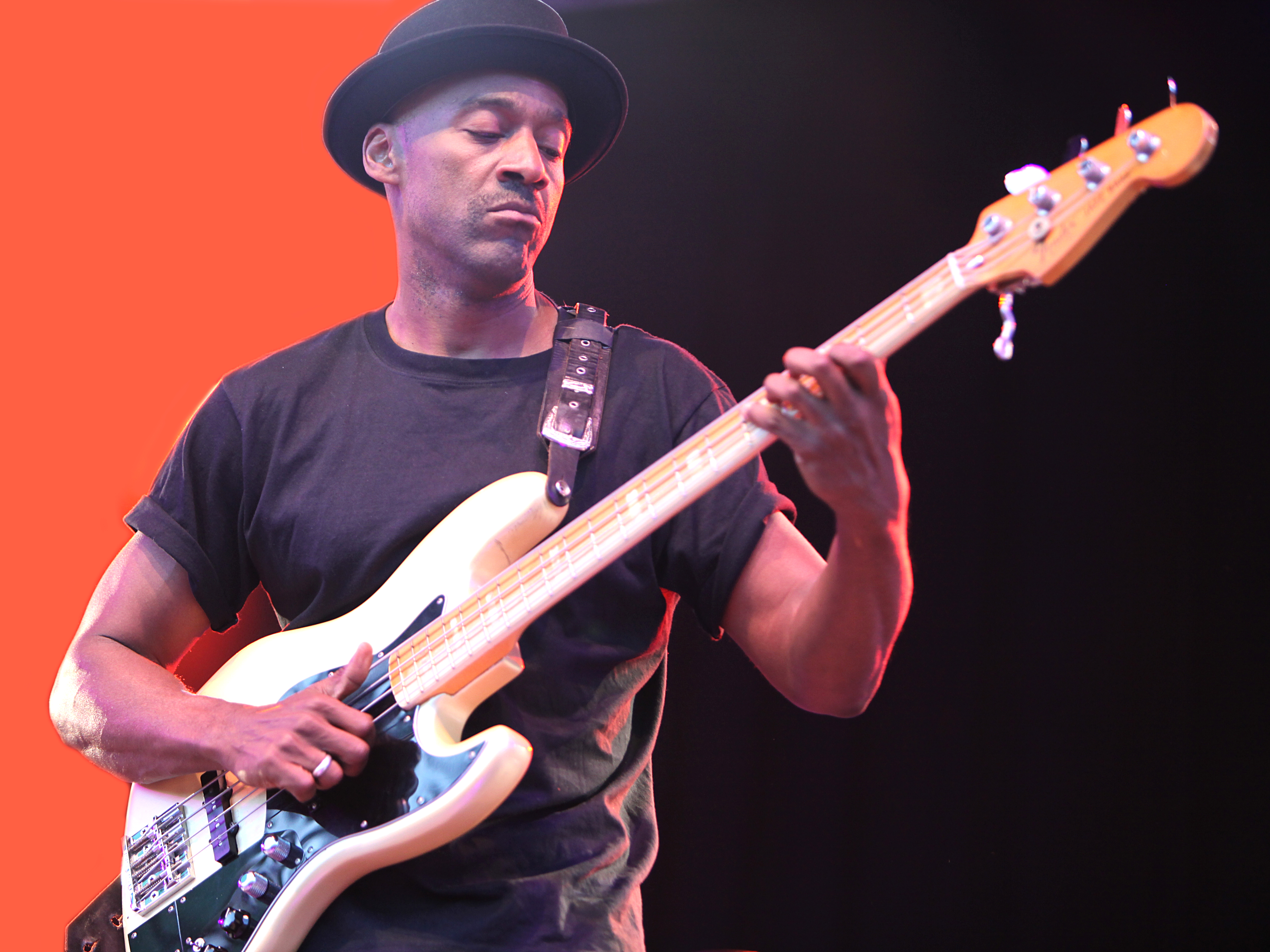
Marcus Miller played bass guitar on "Sidewalk Talk"

"Sidewalk Talk" was first released as a 12-inch promotional single to US DJs and clubs on October 21, 1984. Rikky Rooksby, author of The Complete Guide to the Music of Madonna, said that the synthpop song "sounded like it was a leftover from [Madonna's] debut album" because of its sonic similarity. Chuck Eddy, author of The Accidental Evolution of Rock'n'roll: A Misguided Tour Through Popular Music, compared the track to the sound of American new wave band, Tom Tom Club. Billboard magazine's dance music reviewer Brian Chin said that the song "touched base" with the Top-40 mainstream radio audience. For author Ira Robins, "Sidewalk Talk" was the "best track" on the EP, because of its "lucidness".

In 2011, the EP was re-released by Gold Legion Records, and four remixes of "Sidewalk Talk" were included. The CD booklet consisted of an essay by David Nick Ybarra, editor and founder of Daeida magazine. In the essay, Ybarra noted that "Sidewalk Talk" was never promoted in the press kits for Wotupski!?! Instead another song, "The Mexican", was noted on the album cover's hype sticker. Nevertheless, Ybarra said that it was the inclusion of "Sidewalk Talk" which became the most critical aspect of the public's interest in the release. In September 2014, Rolling Stone ranked the song at number 71 on their list of the "100 Best Singles of 1984". Maura Johnston from the magazine noted that the song was similar in composition to other production work of Benitez, like Madonna's "Holiday" (1983), and described it as distilling "the essence of New York—full of fast-moving possibility and flash, but to be handled with caution in order to be survived."

Regarding the song's credits, Ybarra also found it mysterious that a relatively unknown singer like Buchanan received lead vocal billing, while Madonna was relegated to backing vocalist. Wheeler, one of the backing vocalists, confirmed to Ybarra that she did not remember Buchanan being present in the recording studio. Ybarra theorized that Benitez might have intended "Sidewalk Talk" for Madonna's first album, but since it was not included, he replaced Madonna's vocals on the track with Buchanan since she was unknown. Thereby Benitez could use the track for his EP and it would not be mistaken as a vehicle for another artist other than Jellybean. In 1986, Alvin and the Chipmunks covered the song for their TV series episode "Chipmunk Vice". "Sidewalk Talk" appeared in the 1999 film Flawless and on its soundtrack album.

== Chart performance ==
"Sidewalk Talk" debuted at number 48 on the Billboard Hot Dance Club Songs chart for the issue dated December 22, 1984. After five weeks, it reached the top of the chart, replacing Nuance's song, "Loveride". In an article published in Billboard, Chin noted that "Sidewalk Talk" was an unusual song to reach the top of the dance chart, since it was not released till then in commercially available 7-inch or 12-inch forms. The song was only serviced in remix form to the clubs. Chin added that the song's "emergence without a hard copy, so to speak, is highly uncharacteristic of a market, in which the 'commercial twelve' is a given for a long-show pop record." The song harkened back to the time when remix forms were not available except for club promotions. "Sidewalk Talk" ranked at number 20 on the year end tabulation of the Top Dance Club Songs for 1985. The song was released in 7-inch and 12-inch formats after eight months and entered the Billboard Hot 100 chart at number 80 on the issue dated November 16, 1985. After twelve weeks, it reached a peak of number 18 on the chart. Its final appearance on the chart was on the week ending March 15, 1986. On the Hot R&B/Hip-Hop Songs chart, "Sidewalk Talk" reached a peak of number 51, and was present for a total of nine weeks.

"Sidewalk Talk" also charted in the United Kingdom, where it was credited as "Jellybean featuring Catherine Buchanan". It reached a peak of number 47 on the UK Singles Chart on the issue dated February 1, 1986, and was present for a total of four weeks. On the Netherlands Single Top 100, it reached a peak of No. 31, while it did not chart on the Top 40 comprehensive chart (it only made the promotional Tip Parade). "Sidewalk Talk" also peaked at number 34 on the Official New Zealand Music Chart.

== Track listings ==
- US 12-inch vinyl
1. A1: "Sidewalk Talk" (Short Version) – 3:57
2. A2: "Sidewalk Talk" (Funhouse Mix) – 6:10
3. B1: "Sidewalk Talk" (Acappella) – 4:58
4. B2: "The Mexican" – 3:47
- Europe / Germany / 7-inch vinyl
1. A1: "Sidewalk Talk" – 3:57
2. B1: "The Mexican" – 3:47
- Netherlands 12-inch vinyl
1. A1: "Sidewalk Talk" (Dance Mix) – 6:04
2. B1: "Sidewalk Talk" (Funhouse Mix) – 6:10
3. B2: "Sidewalk Talk" (Acappella) – 4:58
- UK 12-inch vinyl
1. A1: "Sidewalk Talk" (Dance Mix) – 6:04
2. B1: "Was Dog a Doughnut" – 7:59
- UK 7-inch vinyl
1. A1: "Sidewalk Talk" – 3:57
2. B1: "Was Dog a Doughnut" – 7:59
- Spain 12-inch vinyl
1. A1: "Sidewalk Talk" (Dance Mix) – 6:06
2. B1: "The Mexican" (Dance Mix) – 8:48
3. B2: "Sidewalk Talk" (Short Version) – 3:57

== Personnel ==
Credits and personnel adapted from US 12-inch single liner notes.

- John "Jellybean" Benitez – producer, arrangement, mixing, drum programming
- Madonna – songwriter, background vocals (lead on bridge)
- Catherine Buchanan – lead vocals
- Stephen Bray – arrangement, synthesizer, drum programming
- Michael Hutchinson – audio engineering, recording, mixing
- Marcus Miller – bass guitar
- Boyd Jarvis – synthesizer
- Fred Zarr – synthesizer
- Ira Siegel – electric guitar
- Bashiri Johnson – percussion instrument
- Trevor Gale – percussion instrument
- Audrey Wheeler – background vocals
- Cindy Mizelle – background vocals

== Charts ==
=== Weekly charts ===
Chart (1985–1986)	Peak position
Netherlands (Dutch Top 40)	6
Netherlands (Single Top 100)	31
Netherlands (Dance Top 30)	5
New Zealand (Recorded Music NZ)	34
UK Singles (OCC)	47
US Billboard Hot 100	18
US Dance Club Songs (Billboard)	1
US Hot R&B/Hip-Hop Songs (Billboard)	51

=== Year-end chart ===
Chart (1985)	Position
US Dance Club Songs (Billboard)	20

== See also ==
- List of Billboard number-one dance singles of 1985

== Bibliography ==
- Cross, Mary (2007). Madonna: A Biography. Greenwood Publishing Group. ISBN 978-0-313-33811-3.
- Eddy, Chuck (1997). The Accidental Evolution of Rock'n'roll: A Misguided Tour Through Popular Music. Perseus Books Group. ISBN 978-0-306-80741-1.
- Jancik, Wayne (1998). The Billboard Book of One-hit Wonders. Billboard Books. ISBN 978-0-8230-7622-2.
- Robins, Ira (1991). The Trouser Press Record Guide (4 ed.). Collier Books. ISBN 978-0-02-036361-3.
- Rooksby, Rikky (2004). The Complete Guide to the Music of Madonna. Omnibus Press. ISBN 0-7119-9883-3.
- Taraborrelli, Randy J. (2008). Madonna: An Intimate Biography. Simon & Schuster. ISBN 978-0-330-45446-9.
