= Babe Ruth (band) =

English rock band

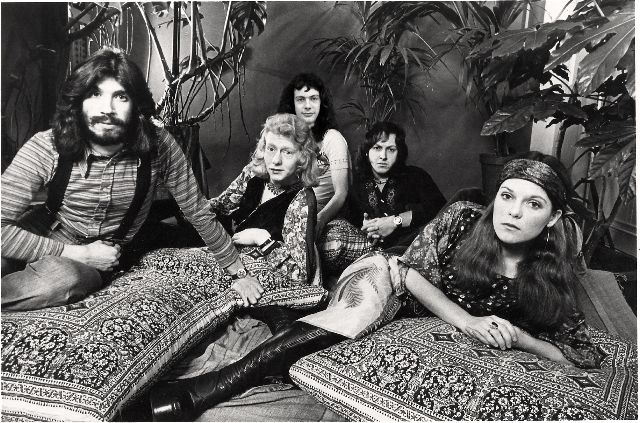
- Babe Ruth in 1973

Background information
- Also known as: Shacklock (1970–1972)
- Origin: Hatfield, Hertfordshire, England
- Genres: Hard rock; progressive rock
- Years active: 1970–1976, 2002–present
- Label: Harvest
- Members: Jenny Haan; David Hewitt; Alan Shacklock; Dave Punshon
- Past members: Jeff Allen; Dick Powell; Ed Spevock; Chris Holmes; Steve Gurl; Bernie Marsden; Ellie Hope; Ray Knott; Simon Lambeth

Babe Ruth are an English rock band from Hatfield, Hertfordshire, England. They were active in the 1970s and then reformed in 2002.

== History ==
In 1971 after graduating from Royal Academy of Music, Alan Shacklock formed "Shacklock" with David Hewitt on bass, Dave Punshon on piano, Dick Powell on drums, and Jenny Haan as vocalist. Roger Dean later introduced Shacklock to Nick Mobbs, vice president of A&R to the EMI Harvest Records, who got them a show at Marquee Club before signing the band on to the EMI Harvest label.

In 1972, Shacklock was renamed after Babe Ruth, the baseball player. In 1972, Rupert Perry signed Babe Ruth for the United States, and their first album, First Base, was released.

In 1973 Ed Spevock joined Babe Ruth, replacing Powell on drums. Babe Ruth appeared twice on BBC Two's The Old Grey Whistle Test in 1973 on 2 January and 2 August. Shacklock, Haan, Punshon, Hewitt and Spevock survived a near fatal car crash on the M1 motorway coming home from a 1973 performance at Liverpool University. Chris Holmes then joined Babe Ruth on keyboards. Amar Caballero, Babe Ruth's second album, was released in 1973. During a 1973 performance Shacklock was electrocuted but was not badly injured. Bernie Marsden then replaced Alan Shacklock as guitarist.

In 1974 Babe Ruth's first album, First Base, was certified gold in Canada. Steve Gurl joined Babe Ruth, replacing Chris Holmes on keyboards. Babe Ruth appeared again on The Old Grey Whistle Test, this time getting banned from BBC by Bernie Andrews. Babe Ruth was unbanned from BBC in 1975.

The next two albums, Babe Ruth and Stealin' Home, were released in 1975. In 1975 Babe Ruth received the Gold Leaf Award for outstanding sales of their first album, First Base. Babe Ruth's concert in Jardin des Étoiles, Montreal, Quebec, Canada on 9 April 1975, was filmed for television.

With none of the original members left, Babe Ruth released their fifth album, Kid's Stuff, in 1976. Marsden later joined Paice Ashton Lord and Spevock reappeared in Piblokto.

In 2002 Punshon, Haan, Shacklock, Spevock, and Hewitt started working on the sixth album, Que Pasa. Que Pasa was completed in September 2006, and after being made available in digital form via the band's official website, was released on Revolver Records in 2009. The band embarked on a successful reunion tour of Canada in July 2010, playing three concerts at Ottawa Bluesfest, Metropolis Montreal, and at the Festival International du Blues de Tremblant.

On 28 June 2014, Babe Ruth played their only show of that year at Milwaukee's Summerfest.

== Members ==
Current

- Ed Spevock (born Edmund Anthony Spevock, 14 December 1946, London) – drums (1973–present)
- Jenny Haan (born Janita Haan, 9 May 1953, Edgware, Middlesex, now Janita Haan Morris) – lead vocals (1970–1975, 2002–present)
- David Hewitt (born David John Hewitt, 4 May 1950, Dewsbury, West Yorkshire) – bass, backing vocals (1970–1975, 2002–present)
- Alan Shacklock (born Alan Albert Shacklock, 20 June 1950, London) – guitars, backing vocals, organ, percussion, string arrangements (1970–1975, 2002–present)
- Dave Punshon – keyboards, piano (1971–1973, 2002–present)

Past

- Jeff Allen (born Jeffrey Allen, 23 April 1946, Matlock, Derbyshire) – drums (1970–1971)
- Dick Powell – drums, percussion (1971–1973)
- Chris Holmes (born Christopher Noel Holmes, 12 September 1945, Cleethorpes, Lincolnshire) – keyboards (1973–1975)
- Steve Gurl – keyboards (1975–1976)
- Bernie Marsden (7 May 1951 – 24 August 2023) – guitars (1975–1976)
- Ellie Hope – lead vocals (1975–1976)
- Ray Knott – bass (1975–1976)
- Simon Lambeth – guitars, backing vocals (1976)

== Discography ==
=== Albums ===
- First Base (1972), Harvest - U.S. No. 178 CAN No. 87
- Amar Caballero (1974), Harvest
- Babe Ruth (1975), Harvest - U.S. No. 75; CAN No. 85
- Stealin' Home (1975), Capitol Records - U.S. No. 169
- Kid's Stuff (1976), Capitol Records - CAN No. 53
- Que Pasa (2009), Revolver Records

=== Singles ===
- "Wells Fargo" / "Theme from A Few Dollars More" (1972), Harvest
- "The Mexican" / "Wells Fargo" (1973), Odeon Records
- "Ain't That Livin'" / "We Are Holding On" (1973), Harvest
- "Ain't That Livin'" / "Wells Fargo" (1973), Harvest
- "If Heaven's on Beauty's Side" / "Doctor Love" (1974), Harvest
- "Private Number" / "Somebody's Nobody" (1975), Harvest
- "Elusive" / "Say No More" (1975), Capitol Records
- "Elusive" / "Elusive" (1975), Capitol Records
- "The Duchess of New Orleans" / "The Jack O'Lantern" / "Turquoise" (1975), Harvest
- "Elusive" / "2000 Sunsets" (1976), Discoteca
- "SInce You Went Away" / "Standing In The Rain" (1976), Discoteca
- "The Mexican (Deekline & Tim Healey Mix)" / "The Mexican (JFB & Ed Solo Mix)" (2010), Hot Cakes
- "Bob Harris Session" (2 January 1973) (2010), Parlophone
- "John Peel Session" (2 August 1973) (2010), Parlophone
- "Bob Harris Session" (18 February 1974) (2010), Parlophone
- "The Mexican (Remixes)", Central Station

=== Compilations ===
- The Best of Babe Ruth (1977)
- Greatest Hits (1981), Capitol Records
- Grand Slam: The Best of Babe Ruth (1994), Harvest
- First Base / Amar Caballero (1998), BGO Records (two albums remastered with a comprehensive article about the band and photos)
- Babe Ruth / Stealin' Home (2000), BGO Records (two albums remastered with a comprehensive article about the band and photos)
- Kid's Stuff / Stealin' Home (2020), Capitol Records (two albums remastered)
- Darker Than Blue (The Harvest Years 1972–1975) (2022), Esoteric Recordings

=== Videos ===
- Babe Ruth in Concert (TV broadcast of Babe Ruth's performance in Jardin des Étoiles, Montreal, Quebec, Canada on 9 April 1975)
