= Dave Berry discography =

- Studio albums: 6
- EPs: 2
- Compilation albums: 9
- Singles: 26

This is the discography of English rock singer Dave Berry.

== Albums ==
=== Studio albums ===
Title	Album details
Dave Berry	Released: November 1964; Label: Decca
The Special Sound of Dave Berry	Released: September 1966; Label: Decca
One Dozen Berrys	Released: December 1966; Label: Ace of Clubs
'68	Released: May 1968; Label: Decca
Hostage to the Beat	Released: January 1987; Label: Butt
Memphis....In the Meantime	Released: 20 September 2004; Label: Blues Matters

=== Compilation albums ===
Title	Album details
Remembering...Dave Berry	Released: September 1976; Label: Decca
The Crying Game – The Best of Dave Berry	Released: May 1983; Label: Decca
This Strange Effect	Released: January 1984; Label: See for Miles
Berry's Best	Released: 1989; Label: Deram
The Very Best of Dave Berry	Released: January 1997; Label: Spectrum Music
The Singles	Released: 24 March 2001; Label: BR Music
This Strange Effect – The Decca Sessions 1963–1966	Released: 22 September 2009; Label: RPM
Picture Me Gone – The Decca Sessions 1966–1974	Released: 22 November 2010; Label: RPM
The Collection	Released: 25 June 2015; Label: Universal

== EPs ==
Title (Note: This is a list of EPs released in the UK. Various other EPs were released elsewhere.)	Details	Peak chart positions
Title	Details	UK
Me-O-My-O	Released: November 1964; Label: Decca	—
Can I Get It from You	Released: 28 May 1965; Label: Decca	12
"—" denotes releases that did not chart.

== Singles ==
Title	Year	Peak chart positions					
Title	Year	UK	AUS	BEL (FL)	BEL (WA)	IRE	NL
"Memphis Tennessee" (with the Cruisers)	1963	19	8	—	—	9	—
"My Baby Left Me"	1964	37	81	—	—	—	—
"Baby It's You"	1964	24	—	—	—	—	—
"The Crying Game"	1964	5	73	—	—	7	—
"One Heart Between Two"	1964	41	—	—	—	—	—
"Little Things"	1965	5	—	—	—	9	— (Note: "Little Things did not enter the Dutch Single Top 20, but did peak at number 26 on the Dutch Top 40.)
"This Strange Effect"	1965	37	—	4	33	—	1
"Can I Get It from You" (Netherlands-only release)	1965	—	—	—	—	—	7
"I'm Gonna Take You There"	1965	— (Note: "I'm Gonna Take You There" did not enter the Record Retailer Top 50, but did peak at number 22 on the New Musical Express Top 30.)	—	5	45	—	3
"If You Wait for Love"	1966	—	—	17	—	—	7
"So Goes Love" (Netherlands-only release)	1966	—	—	—	—	—	—
"Mama"	1966	5	—	1	15	6	17
"Sticks and Stones/Marble Breaks" (Scandinavia-only release)	1966	—	—	—	—	—	—
"Picture Me Gone"	1966	59 (Note: Chart position is from the official UK "Breakers List".)	—	—	—	—	—
"Stranger"	1967	57	—	—	—	—	—
"Forever"	1967	—	—	—	—	—	—
"Just as Much as Ever"	1968	—	—	—	—	—	—
"(Do I Figure) In Your Life?"	1968	—	—	—	—	—	—
"Huma-Lama" (with the Sponge)	1969	—	—	—	—	—	—
"Change Our Minds"	1970	—	—	—	—	—	—
"Chaplin House"	1970	—	—	—	—	—	—
"Moving On (Turn Around)"	1972	—	—	—	—	—	—
"I Can Make You Cry" (Netherlands and Belgium-only release)	1973	—	—	—	—	—	—
"Night of the Fly" (Netherlands-only release)	1977	—	—	—	—	—	—
"Anyone Else but You for Me" / "Pebble to Pearls"	1980	—	—	—	—	—	—
"Out of Time"	1988	—	—	—	—	—	—
"—" denotes releases that did not chart or were not released in that territory.
