= McVicar (album) =

1980 album

McVicar (Original Soundtrack Recording)

Studio album by Roger Daltrey
- Released: June 1980
- Studios: Advision (London, England); AIR (Montserrat, West Indies)
- Genres: Rock; hard rock; soft rock
- Length: 36:36
- Label: Polydor
- Producer: Jeff Wayne

Roger Daltrey chronology
One of the Boys (1977)	McVicar (Original Soundtrack Recording) (1980)	Parting Should Be Painless (1984)

Singles from McVicar
- 1. "Free Me" Released: July 1980; 2. "Without Your Love" Released: September 1980; 3. "Bitter and Twisted" Released: 1980; 4. "Waiting for a Friend" Released: 1980; 5. "White City Lights" Released: 1981

Professional ratings
Review scores
Source	Rating
AllMusic	3/5 stars
Smash Hits	5/10

McVicar is the soundtrack to the film McVicar and the fourth solo studio album by the English rock singer Roger Daltrey, the lead vocalist for the Who. The film, a biopic of the English convicted one-time armed robber John McVicar, was produced by Daltrey and also featured him in the starring role as John McVicar. All of the then-members of the Who played on the album.

The album was released in June 1980, on Polydor PD-1-6284 in the US. It was produced by Jeff Wayne and recorded at Advision Studios, London. Daltrey's vocals were recorded at AIR Studios, Montserrat, West Indies. The album reached number 22 in the US and produced Daltrey's highest charting solo single to date, "Without Your Love".

In 2001, the Swedish hip-hop group Infinite Mass used Daltrey's song "My Time Is Gonna Come" (as well as the bassline in the song) for their International hit "Bullet". The music video for "Bullet" composites clips from the film McVicar with new footage.

== Track listing ==
Side one
No.	Title	Writer(s)	Length
1.	"Bitter and Twisted"	Steve Swindells	4:07
2.	"Just a Dream Away"	Russ Ballard	4:17
3.	"Escape, Part One"	Jeff Wayne	4:00
4.	"White City Lights"	Billy Nicholls; Jon Lind	3:17
5.	"Free Me"	Ballard	3:59

Side two
No.	Title	Writer(s)	Length
6.	"My Time Is Gonna Come"	Ballard	3:17
7.	"Waiting for a Friend"	Nicholls	3:24
8.	"Escape, Part Two"	Wayne	4:00
9.	"Without Your Love"	Nicholls	3:18
10.	"McVicar"	Nicholls	2:50
Total length:			36:36

=== Singles chart positions ===
- "Free Me", #53
- "Waiting for a Friend", #104
- "Without Your Love", #20

== Personnel ==
Musicians

- Roger Daltrey – vocals
- Pete Townshend – guitar
- Ricky Hitchcock – guitar
- Billy Nicholls – guitar
- Jo Partridge – slide, electric & acoustic guitar
- John Entwistle – bass guitar
- Herbie Flowers – bass guitar
- Dave Markee – bass guitar
- John "Rabbit" Bundrick – keyboards
- Ken Freeman – synthesizer, keyboards
- Ron Aspery – flute
- Jeff Wayne, Steve Bray – brass arrangements
- Kenney Jones – drums
- Dave Mattacks – drums
- Stuart Elliott – drums
- Frank Ricotti – percussion
- Tony Carr – percussion

Technical

- Jon Walls – engineer, AIR Studios, Montserrat
- Cy Langston, Geoff Young, Laurence Diana – engineer
- Richard Evans – sleeve design
- David James – photography

== Charts ==
Chart (1980)	Peak position
Dutch Albums (Album Top 100)	41
New Zealand Albums (RMNZ)	44
UK Albums (Official Charts)	39
US Billboard 200	22

== See also ==
- Roger Daltrey discography
