= The Crying Game (song) =

1964 single by Dave Berry

Single by Dave Berry

from the album Dave Berry
- B-side: "Don't Gimme No Lip Child"
- Released: 17 July 1964
- Studio: Decca, London
- Genre: Pop
- Length: 2:43
- Label: Decca
- Songwriter: Geoff Stephens
- Producer: Mike Smith

Dave Berry singles chronology
"Baby It's You" (1964)	"The Crying Game" (1964)	"One Heart Between Two" (1964)

"The Crying Game" is a song written by Geoff Stephens. It was first released by English rock singer Dave Berry in July 1964, becoming his first top-ten hit in the UK.

The song was covered by Boy George, which reached number 15 on the US Billboard Hot 100 and number one in Canada in 1992. Three versions of the song, by Dave Berry, Kate Robbins and Boy George, were used in the film titled after the song The Crying Game directed by Neil Jordan.

== Background ==
The song was written by Geoff Stephens. Stephens thought the main attraction of the song was the title; to him the title "seemed the perfect seed from which to grow a very good pop song." The sentiment of the song inspired the lyrics and the tune, which according to him, arrived in his "head simultaneously". He thought the line "One day soon, I'm going to tell the moon, about the crying game" was particularly effective. The line "I know all there is to know" was inspired by his father, according to Stephens. Stephens recorded a demo with fellow songwriter John Carter at the Southern Music studio in Denmark Street, and gave a copy to Decca producer Mike Smith. Mike Smith liked the song and arranged for Dave Berry to record the song.

The song was included in Dave Berry's self-titled debut album, where session guitarist Big Jim Sullivan played lead guitar on the tracks, and Jimmy Page supported (though he has said that did not play on "The Crying Game"). On "The Crying Game", Sullivan experimented with a DeArmond wah-wah pedal to change the sound of his guitar, and the song is seen as the first UK hit to feature this effect.

== Release and reception ==
"The Crying Game" was released as a single in July 1964 with the B-side "Don't Gimme No Lip Child". The B-side features Page playing harmonica and was later notably covered by the Sex Pistols for the soundtrack to the film The Great Rock 'n' Roll Swindle. "The Crying Game" became Berry's first UK top-ten hit and he would go on to achieve two further top-ten hits with "Little Things" and "Mama".

Reviewed in Record Mirror, the song was described as an "ultra-commercial tuneful over-echoed number with interesting slow guitar work and a good listenable tune. Emotional and extremely commercial with a very plaintive feel about it". Don Nicholl for Disc, it was described as "a slow wistful ballad ... that has a gentle, intriguing background and a good topline".

== Personnel ==
- Dave Berry – vocals
- Big Jim Sullivan – electric guitar
- Vic Flick – acoustic guitar
- Reg Guest – piano
- Alan Weighell – bass
- Bobby Graham – drums

== Charts ==
Chart (1964)	Peak position
Australia (Kent Music Report)	73
Ireland (IRMA)	7
UK Disc Top 30	5
UK Melody Maker Top 50	4
UK New Musical Express Top 30	6
UK Record Retailer Top 50	5

== Boy George version ==
"The Crying Game"

Single by Boy George

from the album The Crying Game: Original Motion Picture Soundtrack
- B-side: "I Specialise in Loneliness"
- Released: 7 September 1992
- Label: Spaghetti; Polydor
- Songwriter: Geoff Stephens
- Producer: Pet Shop Boys

Boy George/Jesus Loves You singles chronology
"After the Love" (1991)	"The Crying Game" (1992)	"Sweet Toxic Love" (1992)

Music video
- "The Crying Game" on YouTube

English singer and songwriter Boy George covered and released "The Crying Game" in September 1992, by Spaghetti and Polydor Records, and both this version and the original Dave Berry recordings were used as the theme to the 1992 Neil Jordan movie The Crying Game. George's version of the song was produced by the Pet Shop Boys and reached number 22 on the UK Singles Chart, numbers 15 and 10 on the US Billboard Hot 100 and Cash Box Top 100, and number one in both Canada and Iceland. It became the biggest solo hit that George achieved in the US or Canada. The songs are heard during the end credits of the movie.

This version was also featured in the Jim Carrey comedy film Ace Ventura: Pet Detective. This was a joke reference to the film The Crying Game, with which it shared a plot point.

=== Background ===
The Pet Shop Boys became involved in producing the song through the producer of The Crying Game film, Stephen Woolley. The duo had previously contributed the song "Nothing Has Been Proved", sung by Dusty Springfield, for the Woolley-produced 1989 film Scandal. Neil Tennant told NME in 1993, "I think George sings that song really well, he sounds a bit like Roy Orbison."

=== Critical reception ===
Larry Flick from Billboard magazine complimented George's "genius reading" of the song. Dave Sholin from the Gavin Report concluded, "It's been said again and again that all any performer needs is the right material to have a hit. Boy George is just the right singer to resurrect this song". Dennis Hunt from Los Angeles Times wrote, "Those who have seen the movie will understand why Boy George is the perfect choice to sing the moody, Pet Shop Boys-produced title song--easily George's best vocal since the early Culture Club days." A reviewer from Music & Media felt it has the same "ethereal ambiance" as the one to TV series Twin Peaks, "punctuated by a similar big twanging guitar."

Alan Jones from Music Week described it as "a strange little ballad, it's been pumped up in commercial house style by George, whose fragrantly fragile vocals never fail to impress." Frank DeCaro from Newsday found that the singer's version of "The Crying Game" is "the most mesmerizing vocal since Annie Lennox first asked 'Why' last summer. And, it's produced by (and sounds like) Pet Shop Boys, another fave." He also declared it as a "lush, synth update" of Dave Berry's 1964 Brit Hit. Sam Wood from Philadelphia Inquirer wrote, "The gender-bending karma chameleon teams up with the Pet Shop Boys for a stunning version of the title song that drips with bittersweet languor." Charles Aaron from Spin said, "Heard it in a mall, wanted to weep in my Orange Julius."

The recording was nominated for Best Male Pop Vocal Performance at the 1994 Grammys, losing to "If I Ever Lose My Faith in You".

=== Track listings ===
- UK and European 7-inch

A. "The Crying Game"
B. "I Specialise in Loneliness" (edit)

- US 7-inch (red vinyl)

A. "The Crying Game"
B. "Stand by Your Man" (by Lyle Lovett)

- European and UK 12-inch and CD single

1.(A) "The Crying Game"
2.(B1) "The Crying Game" (extended dance mix)
3.(B2) "I Specialise in Loneliness" (edit)

- US cassette single

A. "The Crying Game" (Boy George)
B. "The Crying Game" (Dave Berry)

=== Charts ===
==== Weekly charts ====
Chart (1992–1993)	Peak position
Australia (ARIA)	39
Canada Top Singles (RPM)	1
Canada Adult Contemporary (RPM)	2
Europe (Eurochart Hot 100)	46
Germany (GfK)	68
Iceland (Íslenski Listinn Topp 40)	1
Ireland (IRMA)	26
Panama (UPI)	6
Sweden (Sverigetopplistan)	32
UK Singles (Official Charts)	22
UK Airplay (Music Week)	16
UK Dance (Music Week)	54
US Billboard Hot 100	15
US Adult Contemporary (Billboard)	14
US Alternative Airplay (Billboard)	13
US Dance Singles Sales (Billboard)	44
US Pop Airplay (Billboard)	11
US Cash Box Top 100	10

==== Year-end charts ====
Chart (1993)	Position
Canada Top Singles (RPM)	19
Canada Adult Contemporary (RPM)	26
Iceland (Íslenski Listinn Topp 40)	10

=== Release history ===
Region	Date	Format(s)	Label(s)	Ref.
United Kingdom	7 September 1992	7-inch vinyl; 12-inch vinyl; CD; cassette	Spaghetti; Polydor	
Australia	9 November 1992	CD; cassette	Polydor	
Japan	26 May 1993	Mini-CD	Polydor	

== Other versions ==
- Brenda Lee charted the first US version of "The Crying Game", reaching number 87 in January 1965.
- Ian and the Zodiacs released a charting version in 1964 in the US.
- Kylie Minogue covered the song on her KylieFever2002 Tour, incorporating it in a medley with several other ballads.
- Still Corners released a cover on October 31, 2025. The single, a dream-pop take on the 1964 Dave Berry classic, was released through Wrecking Light Records.
