= Without Your Love (Roger Daltrey song) =

- Cover of the Netherlands release

Single by Roger Daltrey

from the album McVicar
- B-side: "Escape, Part One"
- Released: September 1980
- Recorded: 1980
- Studio: Advision (London, England); AIR (Montserrat, West Indies)
- Genre: Soft rock
- Length: 3:17
- Label: Polydor
- Songwriter: Billy Nicholls
- Producer: Jeff Wayne

Roger Daltrey singles chronology
| "Free Me" (1980) | "Without Your Love" (1980) | "Walking in My Sleep" (1984) |

Official audio
- "Without Your Love" on YouTube

"Without Your Love" is a song released in 1980 by the English rock singer Roger Daltrey, the lead vocalist of the Who, written by Billy Nicholls for Daltrey's fourth solo studio album McVicar. The song was included on the soundtrack of the film McVicar, a bio-pic of the English journalist and convicted one-time armed robber John McVicar, that was produced by Daltrey and also featured him in the starring role. The original version of the song was by Billy Nicholls himself with his band White Horse in 1977.

The single was produced by Jeff Wayne and recorded at Advision Studios in London with Daltrey's vocals recorded at AIR Studios in Montserrat, West Indies.

== Track listings ==
US

- "Without Your Love" – 3:17
- "Escape, Part One" – 3:58

Belgium and Spain

- "Without Your Love"
- "Say It Ain't So, Joe"

Netherlands

- "Without Your Love"
- "My Time Is Gonna Come"

== Charts ==
"Without Your Love" was released as a single in the United States, and in various European countries in 1980 and peaked at No. 20 on the Billboard Hot 100. It was also a minor hit in the UK, reaching No. 55 on the UK singles chart, and was a big hit in the Netherlands, reaching No. 2 there.

=== Weekly charts ===
| Chart (1980–1981) | Peak position |
|---|---|
| Belgium (Ultratop 50 Flanders) | 5 |
| Netherlands (Dutch Top 40) | 3 |
| Netherlands (Single Top 100) | 2 |
| UK Singles (Official Charts) | 55 |
| US Billboard Hot 100 | 20 |
| US Adult Contemporary (Billboard) | 4 |

=== Year-end charts ===
| Chart (1981) | Position |
|---|---|
| Belgium (Ultratop Flanders) | 52 |
| Netherlands (Dutch Top 40) | 20 |
| Netherlands (Single Top 100) | 21 |

== See also ==
- Roger Daltrey discography
