= Free Me (Roger Daltrey song) =

1980 single by Roger Daltrey

Single by Roger Daltrey

from the album McVicar
- A-side: "Free Me"
- B-side: "McVicar"
- Released: July 1980
- Recorded: 1980
- Studio: Advision (London, England); AIR (Montserrat, West Indies)
- Genre: Rock
- Length: 3:59
- Label: Polydor
- Songwriter: Russ Ballard
- Producer: Jeff Wayne

Roger Daltrey singles chronology
"Leon" (1978)	"Free Me" (1980)	"Without Your Love" (1980)

Official audio
- "Free Me" on YouTube

"Free Me" is a song written by Russ Ballard and performed by the English rock singer Roger Daltrey, the lead vocalist for the English rock band the Who. The song is on Daltrey's fourth solo studio album McVicar, and in the drama film McVicar (both 1980).

== Background and recording ==
"Free Me" was on Daltrey's solo studio album McVicar. The song was written for the soundtrack of the film McVicar, a bio-pic of the English journalist and convicted one-time bank robber John McVicar, that was produced by Daltrey and also featured him in the starring role.

The single was produced by Jeff Wayne and recorded at Advision Studios in London, England with Daltrey's vocals recorded at AIR Studios in Montserrat, West Indies.

== Charts ==
The single reached No. 39 on the UK singles chart and No. 53 on the US Billboard Hot 100.
