= Would You Believe (Billy Nicholls album) =

Studio album by Billy Nicholls
- Released: April 1968
- Studio: Olympic and IBC, London
- Genre: Baroque pop
- Length: 33:36
- Label: Immediate, Southwest
- Producer: Andrew Loog Oldham; except "Would You Believe?" by Steve Marriott, Ronnie Lane

Billy Nicholls chronology
Would You Believe (1968)	Love Songs (1974)

Singles from Would You Believe
- 1. "Would You Believe" / "Daytime Girl" Released: January 1968

Would You Believe is an album by the English singer Billy Nicholls, released in April 1968.

Billy Nicholls was originally hired by Andrew Loog Oldham as a staff writer for Oldham's Immediate Records. Oldham was so entranced by the Beach Boys' 1966 album, Pet Sounds that he enlisted songwriter Billy Nicholls to record a British response. The Small Faces' Steve Marriott can be heard very prominently on "Would You Believe?," despite Oldham's attempts to drown him out with heavy orchestration. Oldham wanted this to be the British Pet Sounds but financial difficulties with the label caused it to be shelved (it only achieved an initial promotional run of 100 copies, as Immediate IMCP009) before it ever hit the streets.

In 1998, Nicholls re-released it on his own label Southwest Records. It was made more widely available on Sequel Castle Communications (CMQDD1358) records in 1999. Several Sequel/Castle editions have been released since, including a version containing demos from the 60s, also originally first released as Snapshot on Southwest Records in 2000.

Other artists recorded versions of Billy Nicholls' songs from Would You Believe. Like Nicholls, Andrew Loog Oldham also produced the 1967 Del Shannon LP Home and Away. This LP was also unissued at the time. It has been reissued in multiple formats since 1978, first called And The Music Plays On and later as Home and Away (album)|Home and Away on CD. Nicholls' songs also appeared on Dana Gillespie's LP Foolish Seasons, first released in 1968 and later reissued on CD.

Would You Believe was selected for The MOJO Collection as one of the most significant albums in musical history.

Professional ratings
Review scores
Source	Rating
AllMusic	4.0/5 stars
The Lama Reviews	8/10

== Original track listing ==
All tracks are written by Billy Nicholls, except where noted.

Side one

1. "Would You Believe?" (Jeremy Paul) – 2:41
2. "Come Again" – 2:34
3. "Life Is Short" – 3:07
4. "Feeling Easy" – 3:12
5. "Daytime Girl" – 2:14
6. "Daytime Girl (Coda)" – 1:36

Side two

1. "London Social Degree" – 2:20
2. "Portobello Road" – 2:05
3. "Question Mark" – 2:26
4. "Being Happy" – 2:28
5. "Girl From New York" – 3:16
6. "It Brings Me Down" – 4:39

== Personnel ==
- Billy Nicholls – vocals, acoustic guitar, background vocals
- Joe Moretti – electric guitar
- Steve Marriott – electric guitar, background vocals
- Big Jim Sullivan – acoustic guitar
- John Paul Jones – bass
- Ronnie Lane – bass, background vocals
- Jerry Shirley, Kenney Jones – drums
- Nicky Hopkins, Ian McLagan, Caleb Quaye – keyboards
- Barry Husband, Denny Gerrard – background vocals
- Arthur Greenslade, John Paul Jones – arrangements; except "Would You Believe?" arranged by The Small Faces
- Alan O'Duffy – recording engineer for "Would You Believe?"

== See also ==
- No Introduction Necessary
