= Strange Pleasures =

Studio album by Still Corners
- Released: 7 May 2013
- Genre: Dream pop; neo-psychedelia; synth-pop; chillwave; new wave
- Length: 44:40
- Label: Sub Pop
- Producer: Greg Hughes

Still Corners chronology
Creatures of an Hour (2011)	Strange Pleasures (2013)	Dead Blue (2016)

Professional ratings
Review scores
Source	Rating
The List	5/5 stars
Drowned in Sound	8/10 stars
The 405	8/10 stars
NME	7/10 stars
Clash	8/10 stars
Mojo	4/5 stars

Strange Pleasures is the second studio album by London-based dream pop band Still Corners. It was released 7 May 2013 by US label Sub Pop.

The album reached a peak of No. 28 in the Billboard Top Heatseekers chart. It also hit No. 1 in the FMQB national radio charts.

== Track listing ==
All tracks written by Greg Hughes:

No.	Title	Length
1.	"The Trip"	6:15
2.	"Beginning to Blue"	3:10
3.	"I Can't Sleep"	3:31
4.	"All I Know"	3:26
5.	"Fireflies"	3:17
6.	"Berlin Lovers"	2:35
7.	"Future Age"	3:04
8.	"Going Back to Strange"	2:31
9.	"Beatcity"	4:05
10.	"Midnight Drive"	4:25
11.	"We Killed the Moonlight"	3:19
12.	"Strange Pleasures"	5:13
