= Sound of Sunforest =

Studio album by Sunforest
- Released: January 1970
- Recorded: Late-1969
- Studio: Olympic Studios
- Genre: Psychedelic folk • folk
- Length: 39:47
- Labels: Decca, Deram, Nova series
- Producer: Vic Smith

Sound of Sunforest is the first and only studio album by the American psychedelic folk group, Sunforest. The tracks have arrangements with medieval and electric sounds in a psychedelic style. The band's material offered diverse and unique sound; but without a hit single, the album did not sell successfully.

Session musicians Big Jim Sullivan and Herbie Flowers, along with multiple other classical musicians, took part in recording. Two tracks from the album, "Overture to the Sun" and "Lighthouse Keeper" were re-recorded by the band to be used in Stanley Kubrick's A Clockwork Orange. The soundtrack album credits the tracks to Terry Tucker and Erika Eigen.

== Popularity ==
Upon the album's initial release it did not sell well, most likely because none of the tracks became a hit single and also because of the multiple musical styles being featured. In October 2004, a section about Sunforest was published in the British magazine Record Collector; copies of the original record started to fetch more than $100. Despite low sales, its use by Stanley Kubrick has given a hint of immortality to Sound of Sunforest, and the album has been re-pressed multiple times, starting from 2000.

== Musical style ==
Even though there is a distinct progressive musical direction throughout the whole album, it contains tracks of very different nature, which is why it is difficult to attribute a definite style to Sunforest.

The track "Overture to the Sun" was written like a Renaissance piece, whereas "Lighthouse Keeper" is rather pop. "Garden Rug" includes a bit of fanfare, while in "All in good time", we can hear excerpts of the kyrie in Latin. Last, "Magician in the Mountain" sets a contrast with its funk, jazz and groove tones.

== External use of tracks ==
In 1971, a rerecorded version of the track "Overture to the Sun" was used by Stanley Kubrick in the movie A Clockwork Orange. It is played in the scene that follows Alex's exposure to the Ludovico Technique, when he is assaulted in public to demonstrate his lack of a violent reaction. (Note: After 1h21min in the movie.) The piece is written in a Renaissance-like style, and its elegance constitutes a counterpoint to the violence of the scene. Later in the film, when Alex comes back home to his parents, "Lighthouse Keeper" (Note: After 1h28min in the movie.) is played. This song, which is cheerful and cute but frivolous compared to the compositions of Beethoven that Alex listens to, is thought to emphasize the lack of taste of his parents.

Terry Tucker, with the help of Vic Smith, recorded a pop remix of "Overture To The Sun", which was released as a single in 1973 by Warner Brothers and credited to Terry Tuckers Orange Clockwork.

In 1995, when the series The Maxx was first shown on MTV, it included "Lighthouse Keeper", but when the series was released on VHS and then on DVD, the song was replaced with another one, probably for copyright reasons.

In 1994, the band Ancient Rites used "Overture To The Sun" as intro for their track "Morbid Glory".

In 1999, the band Blood Axis used "Overture To The Sun" for their track "Lord of Ages".

In 2008, a 50-second shortened version of "Lighthouse Keeper" was used by Marks & Spencer for advertising in the UK. This appearance allowed the track to get popularised, as the statistics from Shazam (a smartphone app to identify songs on the fly) tend to show. The song has indeed been the 22nd most identified song from Monday 25 March to Monday 31 March 2008.

In 2014, "Lighthouse Keeper" appeared in the movie Frank, performed by Maggie Gyllenhaal.

== Re-pressed discs and records released ==
Sound of Sunforest has had at least six reissues since 2000; some of them are non-official bootlegs.

When the album first came out in January 1970, in the UK, it had the label "Deram Nova" which is a sub-label of Deram Records, itself sub-label of Decca Records. At that time, Decca was in competition with EMI, and the Nova series allowed it to release new kinds of music.

Then came the re-presses:

Year	Label	Format	Country	Reference	notes
2003	Hugo-Motes Production	CD	UK	HMP CD-O15	
2005	Cheshire Cat	vinyl record	UK	CAT LP01	Bootleg, limited edition, remastered
2005	Deram Records/Decca/Universal	CD	Japan	UICY-9512	limited edition, 24 bits remastered, stereo
2008	Phoenix Records	CD	UK	ASHCD3025	Bootleg, limited edition, remastered, mono
2009	Lion Productions	CD	US	ACLN1012CD	limited edition, remastered
2011	Tapestry Records	vinyl record	Liechtenstein	TPT 265	limited edition, remastered

== Track listing ==
Side One
No.	Title	Writer(s)	Length
1.	"Overture to the Sun"	Terry Tucker	1:40
2.	"Where Are You"	Vic Smith, Freya Hogue, Erika Eigen	2:42
3.	"Bonny River"	Hogue	2:41
4.	"Be Like Me"	Tucker, Hogue	2:10
5.	"Mr. Bumble"	Tucker	1:49
6.	"And I Was Blue"	Tucker, Hogue	2:49
7.	"Lighthouse Keeper"	Eigen	2:04
8.	"Old Cluck"	Hogue	2:41

Side Two
No.	Title	Writer(s)	Length
9.	"Lady Next Door"	Tucker, Hogue, Eigen	2:26
10.	"Peppermint Store"	Hogue	2:00
11.	"Magician in the Mountain"	Smith	4:09
12.	"Lovely Day"	Hogue	2:45
13.	"Give Me All Your Loving"	Tucker, Hogue, Eigen	2:38
14.	"Garden Rug"	Tucker	2:13
15.	"All in Good Time"	Tucker, Hogue	3:45

== Footnotes and references ==
Footnotes
