= The Last Exit =

2021 album

Studio album by Still Corners
- Released: 22 January 2021
- Studio: Dark Highway Studio
- Genre: Dream pop
- Length: 42:53
- Label: Wrecking Light
- Producer: Greg Hughes

Still Corners chronology
Slow Air (2018)	The Last Exit (2021)	Dream Talk (2024)

The Last Exit is the fifth studio album by dream-pop duo Still Corners. It was released on 22 January 2021 by Wrecking Light Records. The album expands on the duo's dream-pop sound, with expansive instrumental and vocal production. Described by the duo as "desert noir", the record paints a picture of open-road Americana. The album received generally favourable reviews from music critics, who praised the production, lyricism, and Murray's vocal performance.

== Background and production ==
On 17 September 2020, Still Corners announced the release of their fifth studio album, The Last Exit. It serves as a follow-up to their 2018 album, Slow Air. The album's cover art and track list were also revealed simultaneously. All songs were written by the duo, consisting of Tessa Murray and Greg Hughes, the latter of whom also primarily produced the record. The Last Exit was partially recorded before the COVID-19 pandemic lockdown, and was inspired by the desert. Hughes stated in a press release, "We found something out there in the desert—something in the vast landscapes that went on forever." The title track was served as the lead single from the album, and received a music video.

There's always something at the end of the road and for us it was this album. [...]We thought the album was finished but with the crisis found new inspiration and started writing again.

— Greg Hughes on the album, Under the Radar

Described by Still Corners as a "desert noir", The Last Exit expands on their signature dream-pop, deeply atmospheric sound, and paints a picture of open-road Americana. Media publications compared the record to the works of Mazzy Star, Julee Cruise, and Chris Isaak.

== Critical reception ==
Professional ratings
Aggregate scores
Source	Rating
AnyDecentMusic?	7.4/10
Metacritic	80/100
Review scores
Source	Rating
AllMusic	4/5 stars
American Songwriter	4/5 stars
DIY	3.5/5 stars
Mojo	4/5 stars
NME	3/5 stars
The Quietus	4/5 stars
Under the Radar	4/5 stars

At Metacritic, which assigns a normalized rating out of 100 to reviews from mainstream critics, the album has an average score of 80 based on eight reviews, indicating that the response was "generally favourable reviews". At Album of the Year, which collates critic reviews, the album has a score of 80 based on nine reviews. At AnyDecentMusic?, which collates album reviews from websites, magazines and newspapers, they gave the release a 7.4 out of 10, based on a critical consensus of 10 reviews.

Reviewing for AllMusic, Heather Phares wrote that the album was "most captivating when it's not too faithful to any established style" and described it as "a fitting soundtrack for getting lost on the open road." Hal Horowitz of American Songwriter was impressed with the detailed instrumental and production that made the record "stripped down yet sumptuous" and "reverberat[ed] with a sweet yet somewhat aloof feel that forms a slightly heightened pop structure." Writing for DIY, Joe Goggins lauded the instrumental palette and Murray's vocals, and regarded it as the duo's "quietest album" as well as their "most thickly atmospheric" record till date. He elaborated, "If The Last Exit were a road movie, it'd be Paris, Texas."

Charlotte Krol of NME wrote that the album "exudes dustbowl chic, noirish sounds and pandemic-inspired dream-pop." In The Quietus, Will salmon acclaimed Murray's vocals and Hughes' production and wrote that the record "offers a sun-baked equivalent to the dewey, Pacific Northwest pop of Chromatics." Dom Gourley from Under the radar deemed the album as "another exquisite voyage into its creators' enchanting landscape that's both mesmerizing and timeless. Louder than War's Phil Newall said that "The Last Exit evokes abandoned dime store towns, mirage like shapes melting in the distance of dreamy Americana, and right now that escapism is just what we need."

== Track listing ==
All tracks written by Tessa Murray and Greg Hughes.

No.	Title	Length
1.	"The Last Exit"	4:41
2.	"Crying"	3:28
3.	"White Sands"	5:35
4.	"Till We Meet Again"	3:34
5.	"A Kiss Before Dying"	2:45
6.	"Bad Town"	4:12
7.	"Mystery Road"	3:55
8.	"Static"	3:55
9.	"It's Voodoo"	4:44
10.	"Shifting Dunes"	2:35
11.	"Old Arcade"	3:25
Total length:		42:53

== Credits and personnel ==
Adapted from Tidal.

- Greg Hughes – production, songwriting, instruments, mixing
- Tessa Murray – vocals, songwriting
- Joe LaPorta – mastering
- Scott Campbell – artwork
