= Sunforest (band) =

American-English psychedelic folk band

- Origin: Washington DC, U.S.
- Genres: Folk; psychedelic folk
- Years active: 1968–1973
- Labels: Decca, Deram, Nova series
- Past members: Erika Eigen; Freya Hogue; Terry Tucker

Sunforest was an American-English psychedelic folk music trio. It was formed in 1968 by Terry Tucker, Erika Eigen and Freya Hogue. They recorded only one album, Sound of Sunforest, on Decca Records. They are best known for their instrumental musical piece "Overture to the Sun" and their song "Lighthouse Keeper", which were featured on the soundtrack to A Clockwork Orange.

== History ==
Little is known about the trio but the liner notes of their album and the personal website of Terry Tucker provide some information.

Sunforest began in Washington DC, in the late 1960s. Tucker and Hogue knew each other. Hogue set Tucker's poems to music. After meeting Eigen at a party they wrote songs together.

On Hogue's initiative, and since they thought they had composed enough to perform on stage, the three musicians decided to travel to Europe. In 1969, they moved to London, to take part in the music scene. They took the name "Sunforest". Soon after, they met Vic Coppersmith-Heaven (Vic Smith), a representative of Decca Records. That night they recorded a demo, and two weeks later, Smith became their manager.

Stanley Kubrick wanted to include two pieces in the soundtrack to A Clockwork Orange. He asked for "Overture to the Sun" to be re-recorded. Terry changed the arrangement, and that is the version used in the movie, along with "Lighthouse Keeper".

Starting from 1970, the band mostly performed on stage, in the Marquee Club, in the One World Club, in the crypt of St Martin-in-the-Fields, in the Roundhouse and in The Troubadour, as well as in Italy. This lasted for about 3 years. When Eigen left, the group dissolved.

== Members ==
Terry Ann Tucker (Note: Middle names are given in the liner notes of Sound of Sunforest.) (vocals, piano, pump organ, harpsichord and Hammond organ) has a diploma from the liberal arts college of West Virginia Wesleyan. This is where she discovered her love for early music and renaissance music.

Freya Lynn Hogue (vocals, classical guitar, banjo) studied classical guitar with Sophocles Papas. She died December, 2016 in Seattle, WA aged 77.

Erika Melita Eigen (vocals, percussion) has no specific musical education. She drew the illustration on the sleeve of Sound of Sunforest.

== Discography ==
- Sound of Sunforest (1970)

== Footnotes and references ==
Footnotes:
