= Slow Air =

Studio album by Still Corners
- Released: 17 August 2018
- Studio: Dark Highway Studio
- Genres: Dream pop; neo-psychedelia
- Length: 40:00
- Label: Wrecking Light
- Producer: Greg Hughes

Still Corners chronology
Dead Blue (2016)	Slow Air (2018)	The Last Exit (2021)

Professional ratings
Aggregate scores
Source	Rating
Metacritic	66/100
Review scores
Source	Rating
AllMusic	3.5/5 stars
Drowned in Sound	4/10
Exclaim!	7/10
Q	3/5 stars
The Skinny	4/5 stars
Under the Radar	4/5 stars

Slow Air is the fourth studio album by London-based dream pop band Still Corners. It was released 17 August 2018 by Wrecking Light.

== Track listing ==
All tracks written by Tessa Murray and Greg Hughes:

No.	Title	Length
1.	"In the Middle of the Night"	3:39
2.	"The Message"	4:52
3.	"Sad Movies"	4:04
4.	"Welcome to Slow Air"	5:38
5.	"Black Lagoon"	5:34
6.	"Dreamlands"	4:25
7.	"Whisper"	3:21
8.	"Fade Out"	2:28
9.	"The Photograph"	3:41
10.	"Long Goodbyes"	3:02
