= McVicar (film) =

1980 film

- Film poster
- Directed by: Tom Clegg
- Written by: John McVicar; Tom Clegg
- Produced by: Roy Baird; Bill Curbishley; Roger Daltrey
- Starring: Roger Daltrey; Adam Faith; Cheryl Campbell
- Edited by: Peter Boyle
- Music by: Roger Daltrey; Various Artists
- Production companies: The Who Films Ltd. Polytel
- Distributed by: Brent Walker Film Distributors Ltd.
- Release date: 27 August 1980
- Running time: 108 minutes
- Country: United Kingdom
- Language: English
- Box office: £717,786 (UK rentals)

McVicar is a British drama film released in 1980 by The Who Films, Ltd., starring Roger Daltrey of the Who playing the 1960s armed robber and later writer John McVicar.

The film was directed by Tom Clegg, and was based on the non-fiction book McVicar by Himself, which McVicar wrote to describe several months of his experiences in prison. Bill Curbishley and Roy Baird acted as producers, and the film received a nomination in 1981 for Best Picture at MystFest, the International Mystery Film Festival of Cattolica. This is the final film appearance of Adam Faith before his death in 2003.

== Plot synopsis ==
The film is set in two halves, the first in Durham prison and the second half while McVicar is on the run in London. The first half of the film focuses on relations between the prison officers and inmates and also McVicar's plotting and eventual prison escape.

The latter half of the film is set in London after McVicar has escaped from Durham. Here he re-establishes relationships with his wife and young son and he eventually decides to try to escape from his life of crime by trying to fund a new life in Canada.

Eventually, however, McVicar is forced to fund his family's relocation plan by returning to crime. Soon the Metropolitan Police are hard on his heels and he is eventually recaptured when one of his colleagues in the crime world informs the police officer in charge of McVicar's recapture of his whereabouts.

McVicar is returned to prison and his sentence is increased, but during this time he studies for a BSc in sociology and he is eventually released.

== Cast ==
- Roger Daltrey as John McVicar
- Adam Faith as Walter Probyn
- Cheryl Campbell as Sheila McVicar
- Billy Murray as Joey David
- Georgina Hale as Kate
- Steven Berkoff as Ronnie Harrison
- Brian Hall as Terry Stokes
- Peter Jonfield as Bobby Harris
- Matthew Scurfield as Streaky Jeffries
- Leonard Gregory as Jimmy Collins
- Joe Turner as Panda
- Jeremy Blake as Ronnie Johnson
- Anthony Trent as Tate
- Terence Stuart as Sid
- Harry Fielder as Harry 'Aitch'
- Ian Hendry as Hitchens
- Malcolm Tierney as Frank
- James Marcus as Sewell
- Tony Haygarth as Rabies
- Anthony May as Billy
- Michael Feast as Cody
- Richard Simpson as Douglas
- Malcolm Terris as Principal Officer
- Ricky Parkinson as Russell McVicar

== Release ==
The film had its premiere at the Rialto cinema in Leicester Square in London on 27 August 1980. It also opened the following day in three other London cinemas and grossed £29,133 in its opening week, placing second in London.

== Soundtrack ==
The film's soundtrack, a Roger Daltrey solo album, was released as McVicar and featured contributions by the other three extant members of The Who, Pete Townshend, John Entwistle and Kenney Jones, along with other musicians. The music was conducted by Jeff Wayne. The songs are:

1. "Bitter and Twisted", written by Steve Swindells
2. "Just a Dream Away", written by Russ Ballard
3. "Escape Part One", (Instrumental) written by Jeff Wayne
4. "White City Lights", written by Billy Nicholls and Jon Lind
5. "Free Me", written by Russ Ballard
6. "My Time Is Gonna Come", written by Russ Ballard
7. "Waiting for a Friend", written by Billy Nicholls
8. "Escape Part Two", (Instrumental) written by Jeff Wayne
9. "Without Your Love", written by Billy Nicholls
10. "McVicar", written by Billy Nicholls

=== Charts ===
| Chart (1981) | Peak position |
|---|---|
| Australia (Kent Music Report) | 87 |

== See also ==
- Cinema of the United Kingdom
