= No Introduction Necessary =

1968 super session studio album

Studio album by Jimmy Page, Nicky Hopkins, John Paul Jones, Albert Lee, Chris Hughes, Keith David De Groot, Clem Cattini, Big Jim Sullivan
- Released: Late 1968
- Recorded: Late 1967
- Studio: Olympic Studios, London
- Genre: Rhythm & Blues, Rock & Roll, Rockabilly
- Length: 41:39 (original edition); 44:10 (14-track edition); 1:01:33 (deluxe edition)
- Label: Spark; Thunderbolt (reissue)
- Producer: Reg Tracey

Jimmy Page chronology
Little Games (1967)	No Introduction Necessary (1968)	Led Zeppelin (1969)

John Paul Jones chronology
Would You Believe (1968)	No Introduction Necessary (1968)	Led Zeppelin (1969)

No Introduction Necessary is a 1968 studio album conceived as the debut album for singer Keith David de Groot, but released with equal credit given to the session musicians who had backed his vocals. De Groot had previously released a few cover versions of rock and roll songs as singles under the name Gerry Temple. The album tracks were mostly rock and roll covers as well, with a few originals written by De Groot and Nicky Hopkins. Reg Tracey, the producer who discovered De Groot, decided that the musicians had outshone his vocals on the recordings, so the album credited them all equally, and has since been described as a "super session" album, featuring a supergroup of session musicians. The original release sold poorly and was soon deleted. There have subsequently been reissues in various markets under different titles, some with alternative track order or bonus tracks.

The recording sessions were at Olympic Studios in London in 1967. The first nine songs had Albert Lee and Big Jim Sullivan on guitars, John Paul Jones on bass, Nicky Hopkins on keyboards, Chris Hughes on saxophone and Clem Cattini on drums. When neither Lee nor Sullivan were going to be able to take part in next booked session, Tracey called Jimmy Page (who had already worked on "Beck's Bolero" with Jones and Hopkins) for the last round of recordings. Page's participation likely took place in either September or December 1967 during breaks from touring with the Yardbirds.

Subsequent reissues include:

- Super Rock (French and Belgian LP, 1975)
- Everything I Do Is Wrong (1993)
- Voodoo Blues (1995)
- Todo Lo Que Hago Está Mal (Argentina, 1996)
- Lovin' Up a Storm (1996, 2000)
- Playin' Up a Storm (2011)
- Who Rocks It Better? (2012)

== Track listing ==
No.	Title	Writer(s)	Length
1.	"Lovin' Up a Storm"	Jerry Lee Lewis	2:10
2.	"Everything I Do Is Wrong"	Charlie Rich	2:52
3.	"Think It Over"	Buddy Holly, Norman Petty, Jerry Allison	2:31
4.	"Boll Weevil Rock" (aka Boll Weevil Song)	Eddie Cochran	2:06
5.	"Livin' Lovin' Wreck"	Lewis	2:11
6.	"One Long Kiss"	Keith De Groot, Nicky Hopkins	9:46
7.	"Dixie Fried"	Carl Perkins	2:23
8.	"Down the Line"	Roy Orbison	2:19
9.	"Fabulous"	Steve Lawrence	2:23
10.	"Breathless"	Lewis	2:39
11.	"Rave On"	Holly	2:06
12.	"Lonely Weekend"	Rich	2:23
13.	"Burn Up"	Hopkins	5:48
14.	"Everyday" (bonus track)	Holly	2:32

=== 2002 Purple Pyramid bonus tracks ===
The following tracks are from another album featuring Jimmy Page and Nicky Hopkins – Lord Sutch and Heavy Friends:

No.	Title	Writer(s)	Length
15.	"Wailing Sounds"	Jimmy Page, Screaming Lord Sutch	2:38
16.	"'Cause I Love You"	John Bonham, Daniel Edwards, Page, Sutch	2:46
17.	"Flashing Lights"	Page, Sutch	3:14
18.	"Thumping Beat"	Page, Sutch	3:07
19.	"Union Jack Car"	Page, Sutch	3:03
20.	"Baby Come Back"	Page, Sutch	2:31

=== 2012 "Who Rocks It Better?" track listing ===
Tracks were reordered on this vinyl edition with bonus CD. Tracks 1 to 6 (side A of vinyl) feature Jimmy Page, and tracks 7 to 14 (side B of vinyl) feature Albert Lee and Big Jim Sullivan on guitar.

No.	Title	Writer(s)	Length
1.	"Burn Up"	Hopkins	5:48
2.	"Everything I Do Is Wrong"	Charlie Rich	2:52
3.	"Think It Over"	Buddy Holly, Norman Petty, Jerry Allison	2:31
4.	"Dixie Fried"	Carl Perkins	2:23
5.	"Fabulous"	Steve Lawrence	2:23
6.	"Lonely Weekends"	Rich	2:23
7.	"Boll Weevil Song"	Eddie Cochran	2:06
8.	"Rave On"	Holly	2:06
9.	"One Long Kiss"	Keith De Groot, Nicky Hopkins	9:46
10.	"Lovin' Up a Storm"	Jerry Lee Lewis	2:10
11.	"Livin' Lovin' Wreck"	Lewis	2:11
12.	"Down the Line"	Roy Orbison	2:19
13.	"Breathless"	Lewis	2:39
14.	"Everyday" (bonus track)	Holly	2:32

== Personnel ==
- John Paul Jones – bass
- Clem Cattini – drums
- Albert Lee and Big Jim Sullivan – guitars on "Lovin' Up a Storm", "Boll Weevil", "Livin' Lovin' Wreck", "One Long Kiss", "Down the Line", "Breathless", "Rave On" and "Everyday"
- Jimmy Page – guitars on "Everything I Do Is Wrong", "Think It Over", "Dixie Fried", "Fabulous", "Lonely Weekend" and "Burn Up"
- Nicky Hopkins – piano
- Keith David De Groot – vocals
- Chris Hughes – tenor saxophone

Technical

- Glyn Johns – engineer
- Reg Tracey – producer
- Alan A. Freeman – executive producer
- Nigel Molden – coordinator

For bonus tracks 15–20 see Lord Sutch and Heavy Friends

== See also ==
- Super Session
- Music from Free Creek
- Fleetwood Mac in Chicago
- The London Howlin' Wolf Sessions
- Supershow
- Supergroup (music)
