= Dead Blue =

Studio album by Still Corners
- Released: 16 September 2016
- Genre: Dream pop; neo-psychedelia; synth-pop; new wave
- Length: 37:00
- Label: Wrecking Light
- Producer: Greg Hughes

Still Corners chronology
Strange Pleasures (2013)	Dead Blue (2016)	Slow Air (2018)

Professional ratings
Aggregate scores
Source	Rating
Metacritic	64/100
Review scores
Source	Rating
AllMusic	3.5/5 stars
Clash	4/10
DIY	3/5 stars
The Line of Best Fit	9/10
Q	3/5 stars
Under the Radar	6/10

Dead Blue is the third studio album by London-based dream pop band Still Corners. It was released 16 September 2016 by Wrecking Light.

== Track listing ==
All tracks written by Tessa Murray and Greg Hughes:

No.	Title	Length
1.	"Lost Boys"	4:16
2.	"Currents"	3:24
3.	"Bad Country"	3:03
4.	"Crooked Fingers"	4:07
5.	"Skimming"	1:00
6.	"Down with Heaven and Hell"	3:04
7.	"Downtown"	4:01
8.	"The Fixer"	3:11
9.	"Dreamhorse"	3:26
10.	"Night Walk"	5:58
11.	"River's Edge"	1:50
