= Dream Talk =

Sixth studio album by Still Corners

Studio album by Still Corners
- Released: April 5, 2024
- Studio: Dark Highway Studio
- Genre: Dream pop; ambient
- Length: 36:59
- Label: Wrecking Light
- Producer: Greg Hughes

Still Corners chronology
The Last Exit (2021)	Dream Talk (2024)

Dream Talk is the sixth studio album by dream pop band Still Corners. It was released on the April 4, 2024, by Wrecking Light.

== Reception ==
Professional ratings
Aggregate scores
Source	Rating
Metacritic	74/100
Review scores
Source	Rating
AllMusic	3.5/5 stars
Clash	8/10
Under the Radar	7.5/10
Uncut	7/10 stars

AllMusic described Dream Talk as "an alluring reminder of the power of visions and fantasies from a group that's mastered how to bring them to life."

== Track listing ==
All tracks are written by Tessa Murray and Greg Hughes.

No.	Title	Length
1.	"Today Is the Day"	4:23
2.	"The Dream"	4:49
3.	"Faded Love"	4:07
4.	"What Is Real"	1:25
5.	"Lose More Slowly"	4:03
6.	"Secret World"	3:40
7.	"Let's Make Up"	3:07
8.	"Crystal Blue"	3:42
9.	"The Ship"	4:44
10.	"Turquoise Moon"	2:53
