= Creatures of an Hour =

Studio album by Still Corners
- Released: 11 October 2011
- Genre: Dream pop; shoegaze; neo-psychedelia
- Length: 31:50
- Label: Sub Pop
- Producer: Greg Hughes

Still Corners chronology
Remember Pepper? (2007)	Creatures of an Hour (2011)	Strange Pleasures (2013)

Professional ratings
Review scores
Source	Rating
AllMusic	link
Pitchfork	(6.5/10) "Pitchfork review". Pitchfork.
NME	(8/10) "NME review". NME. 7 October 2011.
Drowned in Sound	(8/10) "Drowned in Sound review". Archived from the original on 20 July 2014.
musicOMH	(9/10) "music OMH review". 9 October 2011.
Clash	(8/10) "Clash review". 27 September 2011.

Creatures of an Hour is the debut studio album by London-based dream pop band Still Corners, released 11 October 2011 by US label Sub Pop. The album received favorable reviews.

== Track listing ==
All tracks written by Greg Hughes:

No.	Title	Length
1.	"Cuckoo"	3:09
2.	"Circulars"	2:05
3.	"Endless Summer"	3:17
4.	"Into the Trees"	4:00
5.	"The White Season"	2:53
6.	"I Wrote in Blood"	4:10
7.	"The Twilight Hour"	3:33
8.	"Velveteen"	2:37
9.	"Demons"	2:14
10.	"Submarine"	4:07

== Reception ==
The music review website Pitchfork gave the album a score of 6.5 out of 10 and described it as "a cohesive statement of the band's nouvelle-vague-nodding retro-cool." Metacritic, which uses a weighted average, assigned the album a score of 78 out of 100, based on 13 critic reviews, indicating "generally favorable reviews".
