= Big Jim Sullivan =

British guitarist (1941–2012)

- Born: James George Tomkins; 14 February 1941; Uxbridge, England
- Died: 2 October 2012 (aged 71) Billingshurst, England
- Occupation: Musician
- Instruments: Guitar, sitar
- Years active: 1958–2012

James George Tomkins (14 February 1941 – 2 October 2012), known professionally as Big Jim Sullivan, was an English guitarist.

Best known as a session guitarist, he was one of the most in-demand studio musicians in the UK in the 1960s and 1970s, and performed on around 750 charting singles over his career, including 54 UK number one hits.

== Early life and career ==
James George Tomkins was born in Hillingdon Hospital, Middlesex, England, and went to Woodfield Secondary School in Cranford, Middlesex. At the age of 14, he began learning the guitar, and within two years had turned professional. When he was young he played with Sid Gilbert and the Clay County Boys, a Western swing group, Johnny Duncan's Blue Grass Boys, Vince Taylor & the Playboys, Janice Peters & the Playboys, and the Vince Eager Band. Sullivan gave guitar lessons to near-neighbour Ritchie Blackmore.

In 1959, at The 2i's Coffee Bar, he met Marty Wilde and was invited to become a member of his backing group, the Wildcats, who were the opening act in the television series, Oh Boy!, produced by Jack Good. The Wildcats backed Eddie Cochran and Gene Vincent on their tour of Britain in 1960, during which Cochran died. Wilde bought Sullivan a Gibson Les Paul guitar, reputedly the first to be played in Britain, which he had bought from Sister Rosetta Tharpe. He later played a cherry-red Gibson ES-345 guitar.

Sullivan, Ritchie Blackmore and Pete Townshend persuaded Jim Marshall to make better and more affordable amplifiers.

== Session musician ==
Jack Good introduced Sullivan to studio work. Sullivan became one of the most sought-after guitarists throughout the 1960s and the 1970s, in part because of his flexibility in playing different styles of music. He was often referred to as "Big Jim" both for his physical appearance and as he was usually first choice to play guitar on sessions for major musicians and bands. Another session musician at the time, and at some of the same sessions, Jimmy Page, was referred to as "Little Jim".

Sullivan played on around 750 UK chart entries, and averaged three recording sessions a day. He played on the first records in the UK to use a wah-wah effect – Michael Cox's 1961 "Sweet Little Sixteen" and Dave Berry's 1964 hit "The Crying Game" used a DeArmond Tone and Volume pedal. He played on the first record in the UK to use a fuzzbox, which he had borrowed from session guitarist Eric Ford, on P.J. Proby's 1964 hit "Hold Me".

In the early 1960s he also played on hits by The Rolling Stones, Marianne Faithfull, Billy Fury, Frank Ifield, Adam Faith, Frankie Vaughan, Helen Shapiro, Johnny Hallyday, Freddie and the Dreamers, Cilla Black, Tom Jones, Shirley Bassey, Dusty Springfield, and others. He played guitar on the Alexis Korner's and Blues Incorporated's album R&B from the Marquee in 1962 and Georgie Fame's first album Rhythm & Blues at the Flamingo in 1964.

In addition to playing on many UK albums Sullivan played on The Everly Brothers's 1963 live album at Olympia, Bobby Darin's 1967 live album Something Special, Little Richard's 1966 album Get Down With It: The OKeh Sessions and Del Shannon's 1967 album, Home and Away. He appeared regularly on several British television and radio programmes, including the Tom Jones show, Bay City Rollers show "Shang-A-Lang",Top of the Pops, Ready Steady Go! and Saturday Club.

Later in the 1960s and 1970s, Sullivan continued to play on a succession of hit records including those by The Walker Brothers, Jonathan King, Donovan, Cat Stevens, David Bowie (he played banjo, guitar and sitar on Bowie's first album which was published in 1967), Benny Hill, The New Seekers, Thunderclap Newman, Love Affair, Long John Baldry, Marmalade, Small Faces, and Rolf Harris.

In 1968, Sullivan played on George Harrison's Wonderwall. He directed and played on Amazing Blondel's first album in 1969, and in the same year played on the album Sound of Sunforest, the overture from which was used in the film A Clockwork Orange. In 1971, he played in the Jean-Claude Vannier Orchestra for Serge Gainsbourg's Histoire de Melody Nelson, and also played on Frank Zappa's 200 Motels. In 1972, he performed additional arrangements of the orchestral version of The Who's Tommy arranged by Wil Malone for London Symphony Orchestra and English Chamber Choir.

== Sitar ==
In the 1960s, Sullivan learned to play the sitar, having been inspired by attending a recording session for Indian classical musician Vilayat Khan. Sullivan released an album of Indian-style recordings under his own name, Sitar Beat (1967), and one as "Lord Sitar", Lord Sitar (1968).

He played sitar on a musical interpretation of the Kama Sutra. Sullivan was among a group of English guitarists who adopted the sitar, including George Harrison of the Beatles, whose Esher home Sullivan regularly visited to practice on the instrument. Throughout this period, Sullivan studied formally with Nazir Jairazbhoy and, until 1969, he all but abandoned guitar in favour of the sitar. Together with Harrison, Brian Jones of the Rolling Stones and Shawn Phillips, he was among the most dedicated of the many rock guitarists who embraced the instrument during the 1960s.

== Moving from being a session musician ==
In 1969, Sullivan joined Tom Jones' band. During his time with Jones in Las Vegas, he met and formed a friendship with Elvis Presley. Sullivan was an innovator of the talk box, which he demonstrated on Jones' TV show. He released an instrumental album Sullivan Plays O'Sullivan (1973) and was also featured giving guitar lessons on the Bay City Rollers' TV series Shang A Lang. In the 1970s he composed the score for an episode of the science fiction series, Space: 1999 ("The Troubled Spirit"), in which he also appeared and performed part of the score on screen, as a crew member giving a Coral sitar concert.

In 1974, Sullivan teamed up with the record producer, Derek Lawrence, to form the record label, Retreat Records. One album release was Big Jim's Back (1975). He fronted a band called Tiger, alongside vocalist Nicky Moore, releasing three albums under this name before the group split up in 1976. Retreat Records also produced various artists. Amongst them were Labi Siffre, Chas & Dave and McGuinness Flint. Sullivan produced and arranged Siffre's "I Got The...", sampled by Eminem and numerous other hip hop artists. Lawrence and Sullivan went to the United States during this period, to produce the glam metal band, Angel.

In 1978, he became part of the James Last Orchestra for nine years, also touring with Olivia Newton-John after her success with Grease. In 1987, he began composing music for films and jingles.

Sullivan later formed a duo with songwriter Duncan McKenzie. They played together for many years and recorded an album, Aquila.

In 2003 until his death Sullivan toured with Doug Pruden as the BJS Duo. (recording Hayley's Eyes CD & Guitar Maestros DVD).

== Death ==
Sullivan died on 2 October 2012, aged 71 due to complications from heart disease and diabetes.

== Discography ==
=== Albums ===
- 1964 – Charles Blackwell and Jimmy Sullivan – Classics with a Beat (Hörzu)
- 1965 – Charles Blackwell and Jimmy Sullivan – Folklore with a Beat (Electrola)
- 1968 – Chiitra Neogy – The Perfumed Garden (Sullivan as arranger, Barry Morgan as musical advisor) (Pulsar)
- 1968 – Big Jim Sullivan – Sitar Beat – Album was released in UK by Mercury in 1967 as Sitar A Go Go and reissued by Mercury in January 1968 as Sitar Beat for wider distribution
- 1968 – Jimmy Page, John Paul Jones, Albert Lee, Big Jim Sullivan – No Introduction Necessary (Spark)
- 1969 – Big Jim Sullivan – Lord Sitar (Columbia)
- 1973 – Big Jim Sullivan – Sullivan Plays O'Sullivan (MAM)
- 1974 – Big Jim Sullivan – Big Jim's Back (Retreat)
- 1975 – Tiger – Tiger (Warner Bros.)
- 1976 – Tiger – Goin' Down Laughing (EMI)
- 1977/1983 – Big Jim Sullivan Band – Test of Time
- 1992 – Jim Sullivan – Forbidden Zones – Guitar Tutoring
- 1994 – Big Jim Sullivan's Tiger – Test of Time
- 1998 – Big Jim Sullivan – Big Jim's Back/Tiger
- 2001 – Big Jim Sullivan – Mr Rock Guitar (aka Ultimate Rock Guitar and other titles)
- 2003 – BJS Duo – Hayley's Eyes with Doug Pruden
- 2004 – The Big Jim Sullivan Trio – Jazz Cafe
- 2005 – The Big Jim Sullivan Band – Live at Coolham
- 2006 – Big Jim Sullivan – Guitar Maestros with Doug Pruden

== Notable recordings ==
Sullivan's guitar work appears on the following songs:-

- 1959 Marty Wilde – "Bad Boy"
- 1961 KrewKats – "Trambone" "Samovar" "Peak Hour" "Jack's Good" "The Bat"
- 1961 Michael Cox – "Sweet Little Sixteen"
- 1962 John Barry – "James Bond Theme" (Vic Flick played lead guitar but Sullivan played on the record and devised the walking-step introduction)
- 1962 Tony Hatch – "Out of This World"
- 1963 Bern Elliott and the Fenmen – "Money (That's What I Want)"
- 1964 P.J. Proby – "Hold Me" and "Together"
- 1964 Dave Berry – "The Crying Game"
- 1964 Freddie and the Dreamers – "I Love You Baby"
- 1964 Simon Scott – "Move It Baby"
- 1964 Françoise Hardy – "Je n'attends plus personne"
- 1965 Gerry & The Pacemakers – "Ferry Cross the Mersey"
- 1965 Eddy Mitchell – "(I Can't Get No) Satisfaction" with Jimmy Page
- 1966 Joe Loss – "A Shot in the Dark" (Henry Mancini cover)
- 1967 Clinton Ford – "El Paso"
- 1967 The Truth – "Walk Away Renee"
- 1968 Donovan – "Catch the Wind" and "Colours" (Donovan's Greatest Hits versions)
- 1968 Johnny Hallyday – "A Tout Casser"
- 1968 Anita Harris – "Dream A Little Dream of Me"
- 1971 Serge Gainsbourg - Histoire de Melody Nelson
- 1971 Cliff Richard – "Silvery Rain"
- 1972 Julie Felix – "Clotho's Web"
- 1972 Gilbert O'Sullivan – "Alone Again (Naturally)"
- 1972 Tom Jones – "The Young New Mexican Puppeteer"
- 1974 Alvin Stardust – "Jealous Mind" and "Guitar Star"
- 1977 The Walker Brothers – "Shutout" and "The Electrician" (from their album Nite Flights)

== Number one singles ==
- 1961 Petula Clark – "Sailor"
- 1961 Eden Kane – "Well I Ask You"
- 1961 Danny Williams – "Moon River"
- 1961 Frankie Vaughan – "Tower of Strength"
- 1962 Mike Sarne – "Come Outside"
- 1962 Frank Ifield – "I Remember You"
- 1962 Frank Ifield – "Lovesick Blues"
- 1963 Frank Ifield – "Wayward Wind"
- 1963 Frank Ifield – "Confessin'"
- 1964 The Bachelors – "Diane"
- 1964 Cilla Black – "Anyone Who Had a Heart"
- 1964 Peter & Gordon – "A World Without Love"
- 1964 The Four Pennies – "Juliet"
- 1964 Cilla Black – "You're My World"
- 1964 Georgie Fame – "Yeh Yeh"
- 1965 The Seekers – "I'll Never Find Another You"
- 1965 Tom Jones – "It's Not Unusual" (not the main guitar)
- 1965 Jackie Trent – "Where Are You Now (My Love)"
- 1965 Sandie Shaw – "Long Live Love"
- 1965 The Walker Brothers – "Make It Easy on Yourself"
- 1965 Ken Dodd – "Tears"
- 1965 The Seekers – "The Carnival Is Over"
- 1966 The Overlanders – "Michelle"
- 1966 The Walker Brothers – "The Sun Ain't Gonna Shine Anymore"
- 1966 Dusty Springfield – "You Don't Have to Say You Love Me"
- 1966 Chris Farlowe – "Out of Time"
- 1966 Tom Jones – "Green, Green Grass of Home"
- 1967 Engelbert Humperdinck – "Release Me"
- 1967 Sandie Shaw – "Puppet on a String"
- 1967 Engelbert Humperdinck – "The Last Waltz"
- 1967 Long John Baldry – "Let The Heartaches Begin"
- 1968 Esther and Abi Ofarim – "Cinderella Rockafella"
- 1968 Dave Dee, Dozy, Beaky, Mick and Tich – "The Legend of Xanadu"
- 1968 Des O'Connor – "I Pretend"
- 1968 The Scaffold – "Lily The Pink"
- 1968 Marmalade – "Ob-La-Di, Ob-La-Da"
- 1969 Thunderclap Newman – "Something in the Air"
- 1969 Jane Birkin and Serge Gainsbourg – "Je t'aime... moi non-plus"
- 1969 Rolf Harris – "Two Little Boys"
- 1970 Dana – "All Kinds of Everything"
- 1971 Middle of the Road – "Chirpy Chirpy Cheep Cheep"
- 1971 Benny Hill – "Ernie (The Fastest Milkman in the West)"
- 1971 New Seekers – "I'd Like to Teach the World to Sing"
- 1972 Gilbert O'Sullivan – "Clair"
- 1973 Gilbert O'Sullivan – "Get Down"
- 1973 Peters and Lee – "Welcome Home"
- 1973 New Seekers – "You Won't Find Another Fool Like Me"
- 1974 Alvin Stardust – "Jealous Mind"
- 1975 Pilot – "January"
