= Dave Berry (musician) =

English rock singer and 1960s teen idol (born 1939)

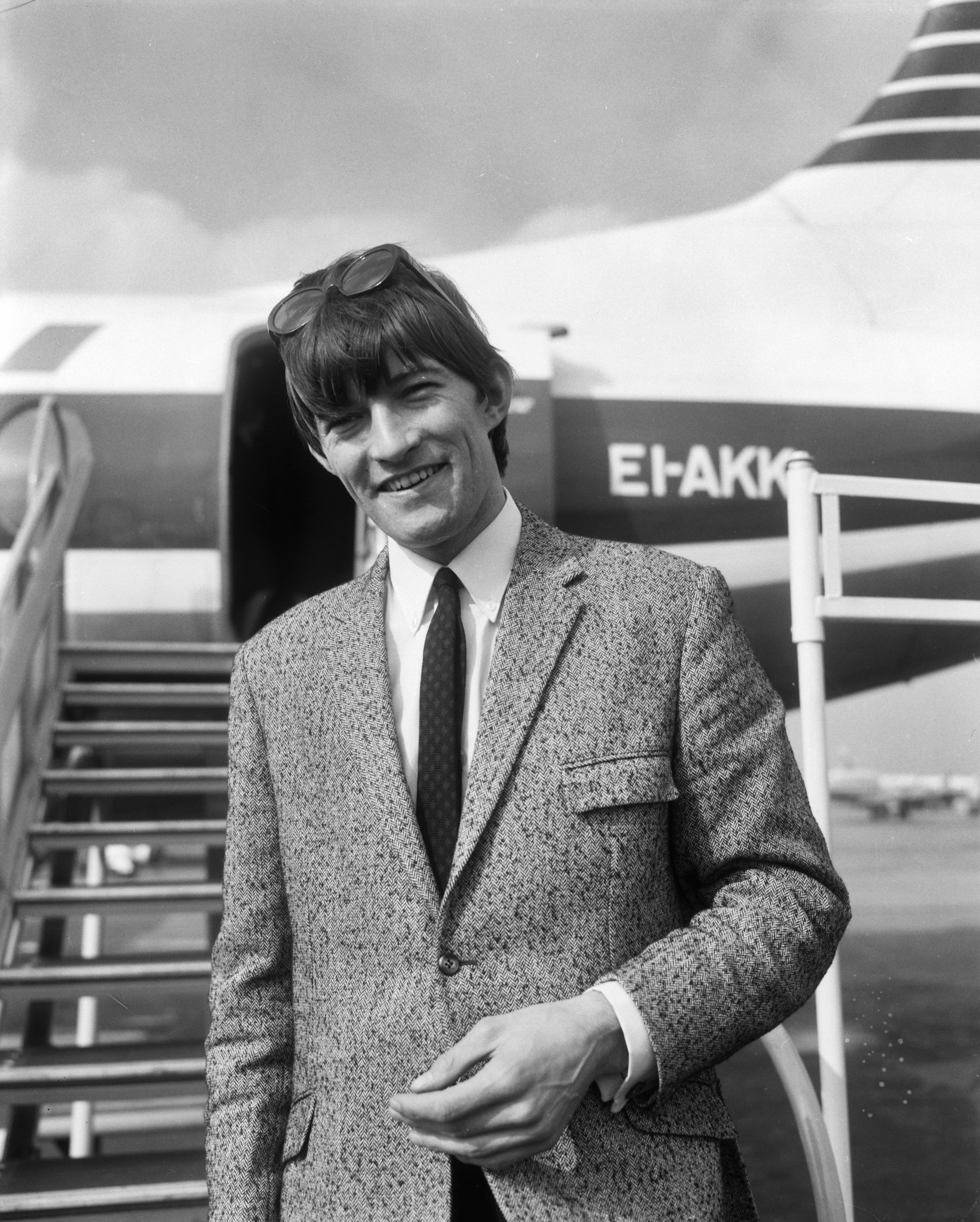
- Berry in Amsterdam Airport Schiphol, after arriving in the Netherlands in 1965

Background information
- Born: David Holgate Grundy; 6 February 1939 (age 87); Woodhouse, Sheffield, Yorkshire, England
- Genres: Rhythm and blues; rock and roll
- Occupation: Singer
- Instrument: Vocals
- Years active: 1963–present
- Labels: Decca; See for Miles; Blues Matters!; RPM (UK)
- Website: www.cryinggame.co.uk

Dave Berry (born David Holgate Grundy, 6 February 1939) is an English rock singer and former teen idol during the 1960s. His best-remembered hits are "Memphis, Tennessee", "The Crying Game" (1964) and his 1965 hit "Little Things", a cover version of Bobby Goldsboro's Stateside Records top 40 success.

== Early life ==
Dave Berry, real name David Holgate Grundy, was born in the Woodhouse ward of Sheffield, South Yorkshire, on 6 February 1939. His father, a bricklayer, was also a professional jazz drummer, and taught Dave how to play the instrument. Berry attended Woodhouse County Council School and left school at age sixteen and worked as a welder.

== Career ==
=== 1960s–1980s ===
Berry's first band that he led was called the Cruisers. A big fan of American rock and roll musician Chuck Berry, Dave Grundy changed his surname to "Berry", and when he signed onto Decca Records with the Cruisers in 1963 (becoming Dave Berry & The Cruisers), after being spotted at a ballroom in Doncaster, his debut single was a cover of the 1959 Chuck Berry song "Memphis, Tennessee". The song went to number nineteen in the United Kingdom in September 1963. The following year, his song "Little Things", originally recorded by Bobby Goldsboro, went to number five in the UK and number one in the Netherlands. "This Strange Effect" (1965), written by Ray Davies, became a number one hit for him in the Netherlands and Belgium, countries where he still enjoys celebrity status, having received an award from Radio Veronica, Netherlands, for their best selling pop single of all time. B. J. Thomas's sentimental "Mama" (1966) and "Don't Gimme No Lip Child", the latter is the flip to Berry's No. 5 hit single, "The Crying Game", in 1964, and covered by the Sex Pistols, were other notable recordings.

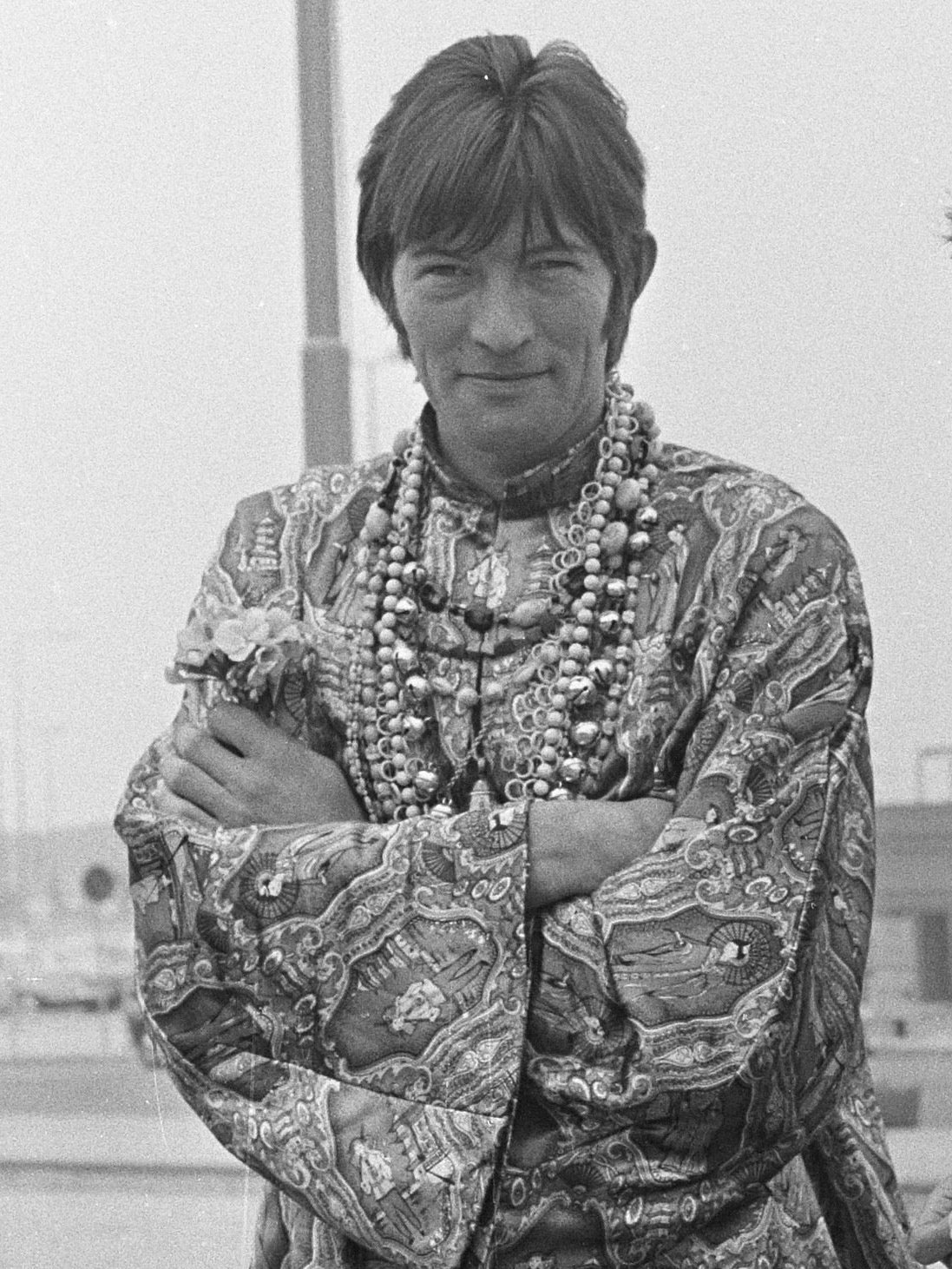
Dave Berry (1967)

Inspired by Johnny Cash and Gene Vincent, and by "presentation, theatre, and images of rock stars", Berry always appeared on stage dressed entirely in black. He performed a mixture of R&B, rock and pop ballads and was popular in Britain, and in continental Europe, especially Belgium and the Netherlands, but had no commercial success in the US, where he is best known for the original versions of Ray Davies' "This Strange Effect" and Graham Gouldman's "I'm Going to Take You There". Berry went to number one in countries such as the Netherlands and Belgium, but never topped the charts in his home country.

His early hits name-checked his backing band the Cruisers who at that time were John Fleet (bass and piano), Roy Barber (rhythm guitar), Frank Miles (lead guitar) and Kenny Slade (drums). Berry parted with this line-up around the time of "The Crying Game" and recruited three more local musicians - Frank White, Johnny Riley and Pete Cliff as the second generation of Cruisers. Lead guitarist White was eventually replaced by Roy Ledger. Berry regularly used session musicians Jimmy Page, John Paul Jones, Big Jim Sullivan and Bobby Graham.

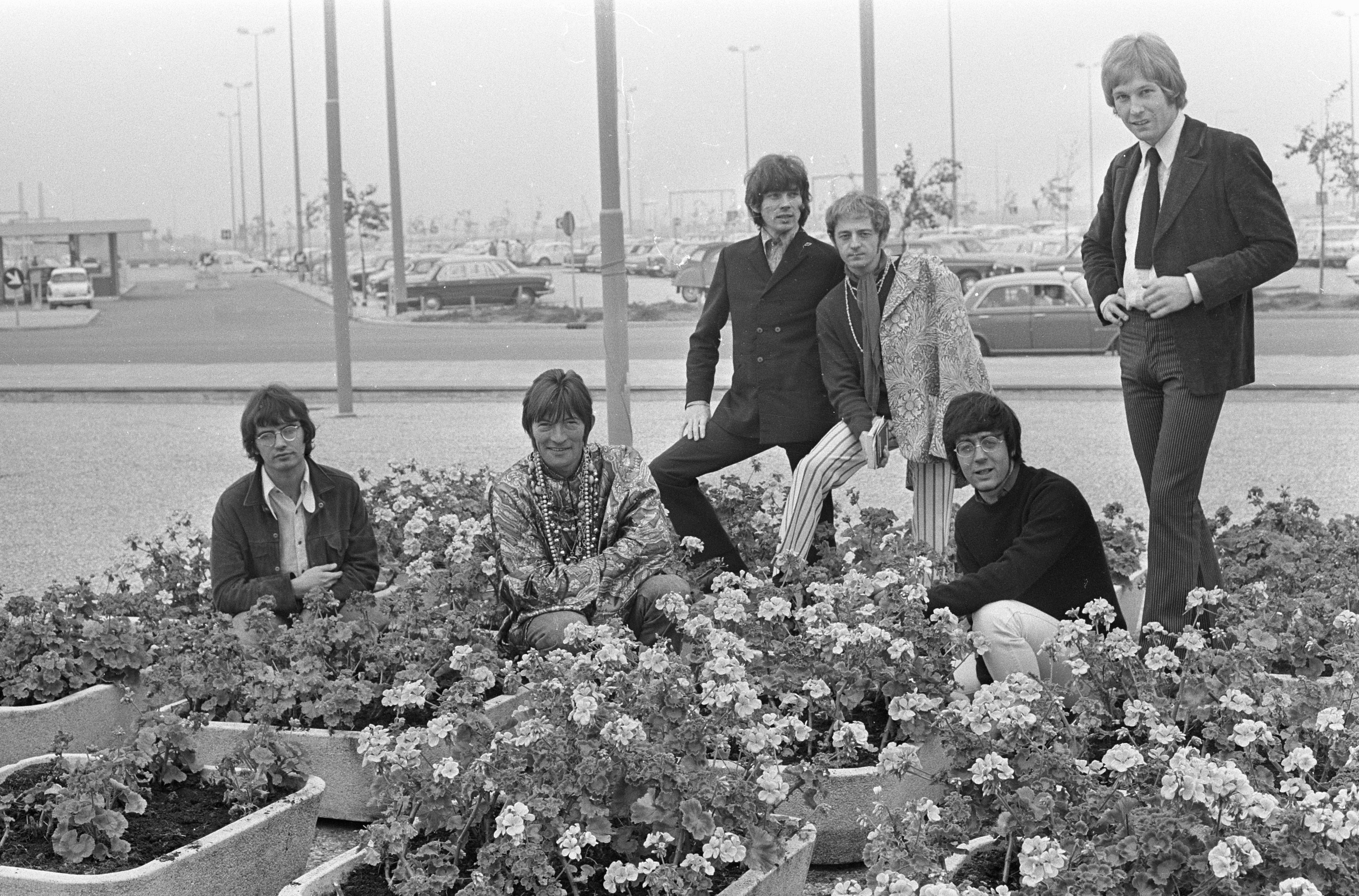
Berry (second from left) with pop group Manfred Mann in 1967

Berry released five singles during the 1970s: "Change Our Minds" (1970), "Chaplin House" (1970), "Moving On (Turning Around)" (1972), "I Can Make You Cry" (1973), and "Night of the Fly" (1977), and released his final two in the 1980s: "Anyone Else but You for Me" / "Pebble to Pearls" (1980), and a cover of the Rolling Stones song "Out of Time" (1982). In 1987, he released his first studio album in nineteen years titled "Hostage to the Beat".

=== 1990s–present ===
The Geoff Stephens-penned song "The Crying Game" brought Berry's voice to his biggest international audience in 1992, when it was used as the theme song for the film The Crying Game. In the final quarter of 2010, "Little Things" was used in an advertisement campaign on British television by Andrex toilet paper. Berry also regained some recognition when he was the surprise hit of the annual Alexis Korner Tribute in 1995. In 1998 "This Strange Effect" was covered by the Belgian band Hooverphonic on their album Blue Wonder Power Milk.

In 2004, Berry released his sixth and currently latest studio album called Memphis...In The Meantime, via Blues Matters Records.

In May 2009, Berry toured the UK and appeared in a cameo role in a theatrical production, The Mod Crop. In August that year, RPM Records issued a double CD anthology of Berry's earliest recordings for Decca, entitled This Strange Effect (The Decca Sessions 1963–1966). The package added two previously unissued tracks made in 1963 (before Berry signed with Decca) with producer Mickie Most: "Easy To Cry" and "Tongue Twisting". Berry's illustrated autobiography, Dave Berry - All There Is To Know, was published in 2010 by Heron Publications Ltd. It included contributions from Joe Cocker, Ray Davies, Tony Iommi, Peter Stringfellow and Bill Wyman.

A double compilation, Picture Me Gone - The Decca Sessions 1966–1974, was released in January 2011. Berry is still touring as of 2023, and is a recurring act in the Sixties Gold tour. Currently in his backing band, the Cruisers, are Daniel Martin (lead guitar since 2010), Adrian Fountain (rhythm guitar since late 2011), Dan Wright (drums, from January 2013) and Brian Wood (bass guitar, joined 24 years ago, the longest serving member of the band).

In February 2024, Berry had to cancel a few gigs after suffering from medical problems on stage. He had to finish a performance at Coal Aston village hall on 17 February early. He reportedly suffered from back pain.

== Stage presence ==
He had an unusual ambition for a pop performer trying to make a name for himself - to appear on television completely hidden by a prop. In his own words, to "not appear, to stay behind something and not come out". He often hid behind the upturned collar of his leather jacket, or wrapped himself around, and effectively behind, the microphone lead. His stage act, which drew on the work of Elvis Presley and Gene Vincent, provided an inspiration for Alvin Stardust.

== Personal life ==
He currently lives in Dronfield, Derbyshire, with his wife Marthy, who comes from Amsterdam, Netherlands, who have been married for over 50 years.

In addition to music, Berry also runs an antique business, where he mainly sells small furniture and rock memorabilia. He has opened two antique shops, one in his hometown of Sheffield, and another near his current residence in Derbyshire.

== Discography ==
Selected singles

- "Memphis, Tennessee" (1963)
- "The Crying Game" (1964)
- "Little Things" (1965)
- "This Strange Effect" (1965)
- "Mama" (1966)

== See also ==
- List of performers on Top of the Pops
- List of artists under the Decca Records label
- British Invasion
- Teen idol
