= This Strange Effect =

1965 single by Dave Berry

- Dutch picture sleeve

Single by Dave Berry
- B-side: "Now"
- Released: 2 July 1965
- Length: 2:28
- Label: Decca (UK); London (USA)
- Songwriter: Ray Davies
- Producer: Mike Smith

Dave Berry singles chronology
"Little Things" (1965)	"This Strange Effect" (1965)	"I'm Gonna Take You There" (1965)

"This Strange Effect" is a song written by Ray Davies of the Kinks, released as a single by Dave Berry in July 1965. The single was released in the United States in September 1965. It reached No. 1 in the Netherlands, but peaked at No. 37 on the UK Singles Chart.

== The Kinks version ==
A studio recording was never officially released by the Kinks, but live recordings exist. An in-studio BBC recording by the Kinks from August 1965 was first released in 2001 on BBC Sessions 1964–1977.

== Other versions ==
Bill Wyman covered the track for his 1992 album Stuff. This version can also be found on A Stone Alone: The Solo Anthology 1974–2002.

"This Strange Effect"

Single by Hooverphonic

from the album Blue Wonder Power Milk
- B-side: "Various remixes"
- Released: 1998
- Genre: Trip hop
- Length: 3:55
- Label: Columbia
- Songwriter: Ray Davies
- Producers: Hooverphonic, Mark Plati

Hooverphonic singles chronology
"Eden" (1998)	"This Strange Effect" (1998)	"Lung" (1998)

Belgian band Hooverphonic covered the song in 1998 for their album, Blue Wonder Power Milk.

A remixed Hooverphonic version of the song also appears on the 1999 Thievery Corporation compilation album, Abductions and Reconstructions.

Steve Wynn also covered the track.

Squeeze covered the song on the deluxe edition of their 2015 album, Cradle to the Grave.

A cover version performed by Unloved serves as the theme song for the 2021 drama series Nine Perfect Strangers on Hulu, as well as appearing in the third season of Killing Eve.

== Chart performance ==
=== Weekly charts ===
Weekly chart performance for "The Strange Effect"
Chart (1965–66)	Peak position
Belgium (Ultratop 50 Flanders)	4
Belgium (Ultratop 50 Wallonia)	33
Netherlands (Dutch Top 40)	1
Netherlands (Single Top 100)	1
UK (Melody Maker)	31
UK (Record Retailer)	37

=== Year-end charts ===
Annual chart rankings for "This Strange Effect"
Chart (1965)	Rank
Belgium (Ultratop 50 Flanders)	3
Netherlands (Dutch Top 40)	5

Chart (1966)	Rank
Belgium (Ultratop 50 Flanders)	69
Netherlands (Dutch Top 40)	33

=== All-time charts ===
All-time chart rankings for "This Strange Effect"
Chart	Rank
Dutch Love Songs (Dutch Top 40)	1
