= Still Corners =

Anglo-American dreampop band

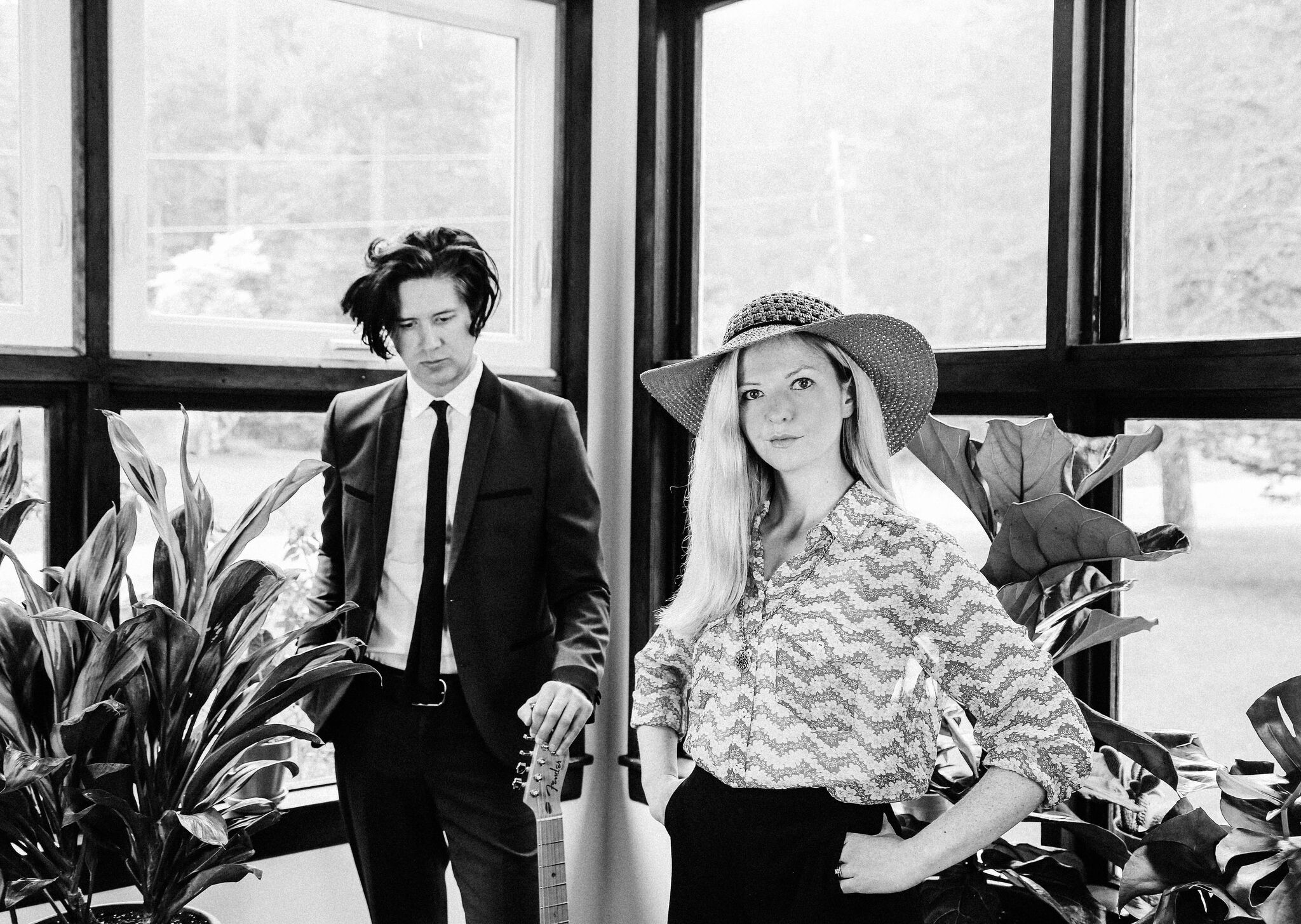
- Still Corners in 2018

Background information
- Origin: London
- Genres: Indie pop; dream pop; neo-psychedelia
- Years active: 2007–present
- Labels: Sub Pop; Wrecking Light
- Members: Greg Hughes; Tessa Murray
- Website: www.stillcorners.com

Still Corners are a British/American dream pop band formed in 2007 consisting of songwriter/producer Greg Hughes and vocalist Tessa Murray.

== History ==
Hughes self-released the debut EP under the Still Corners name, Remember Pepper?, on 13 June 2008. Murray met Hughes by chance in 2009 at a train stop in London when the train was diverted to an alternate station. Murray is originally from England and Hughes grew up in Arizona and Texas, then moved to England for a number of years to pursue a life in music. A 7-inch single, "Don't Fall in Love", was released by UK label The Great Pop Supplement on 30 August 2010.

The duo signed with record label Sub Pop in 2011 and issued their full-length debut, Creatures of an Hour, to favourable reviews.

In October 2012, the band released a new single, "Fireflies", which was named "Best New Track" by Pitchfork.

The band released their second album, Strange Pleasures, on Sub Pop on 7 May 2013. The second single, "Berlin Lovers", received widespread coverage.

Still Corners released their third album, Dead Blue, on 16 September 2016 on their own Wrecking Light Records label. They shared the video for the album's first single, "Lost Boys".

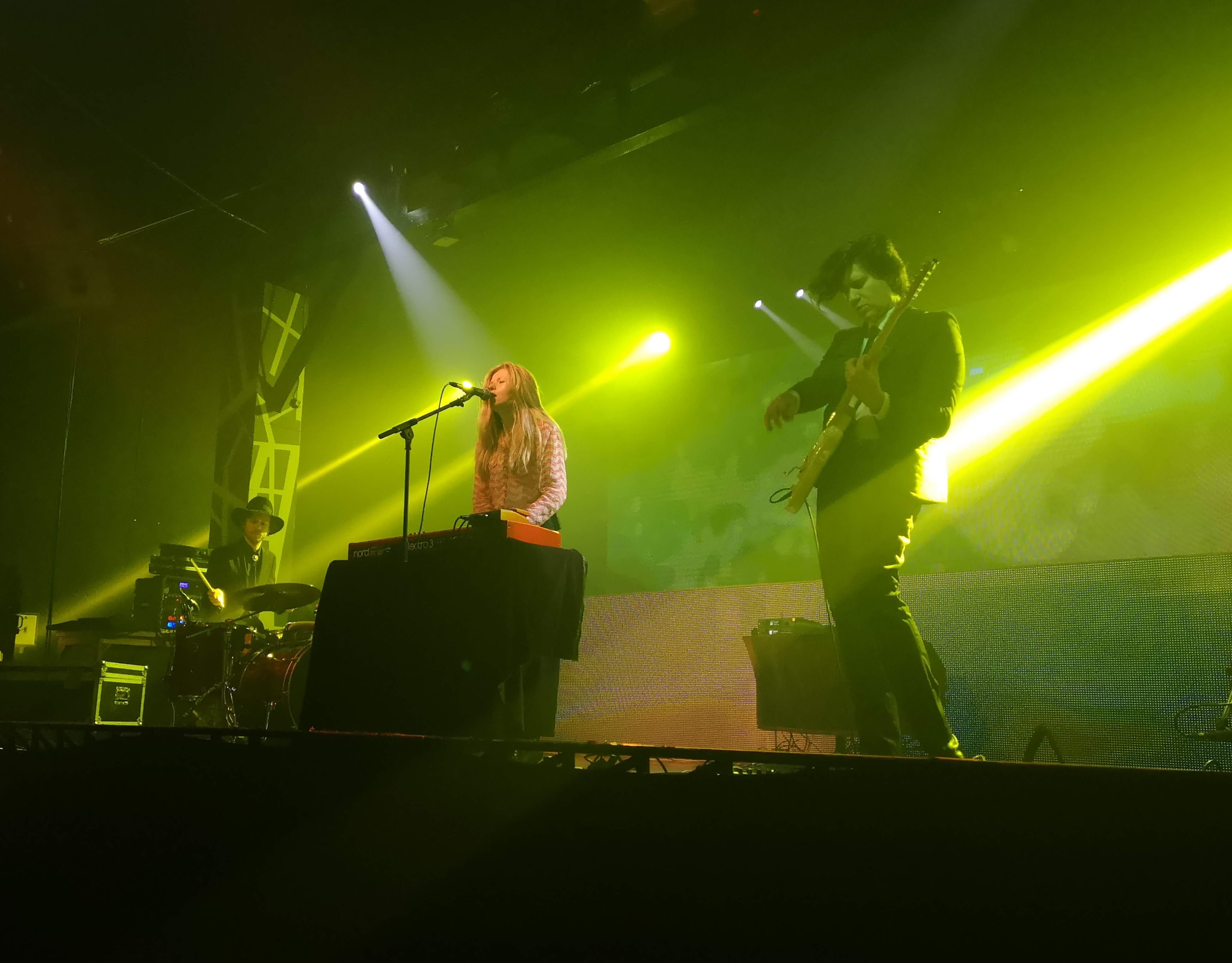
Still Corners performing in Bangkok

On 18 August 2018, the band released their fourth album, Slow Air, via Wrecking Light Records. Following the release, they toured extensively in Europe, North America, and Asia.

Their fifth album, The Last Exit, again via Wrecking Light Records, was released on 22 January 2021. The album was preceded by three digital singles. The band also announced a European tour in October 2021 in support of the new album on their website.

Still Corners released their sixth studio album, titled Dream Talk, on 5 April 2024, via Wrecking Light Records.

== Band members ==
- Tessa Murray – vocals, keys
- Greg Hughes – multi-instrumentalist/producer/engineer

== Discography ==
=== Studio albums ===
- Creatures of an Hour (2011, Sub Pop)
- Strange Pleasures (2013, Sub Pop)
- Dead Blue (2016, Wrecking Light)
- Slow Air (2018, Wrecking Light)
- The Last Exit (2021, Wrecking Light)
- Dream Talk (2024, Wrecking Light)

=== Singles and EPs ===
- Remember Pepper? CD EP (2007, self-released)
- "Don't Fall in Love" 7-inch (2010, The Great Pop Supplement)
- "Eyes" (Rogue Wave cover) digital (2010, self-released)
- "History of Love" split 7-inch with The New Lines (2011, The Great Pop Supplement)
- "Cuckoo" 7-inch (2011, Sub Pop)
- "Endless Summer" promo CD (2011, Sub Pop)
- "Into the Trees" promo CD (2011, Sub Pop)
- "Cabot Cove" flexi 7-inch (2011, Sub Pop)
- "Fireflies" 7-inch (2012, self-released)
- "Berlin Lovers" digital (2013, Sub Pop)
- "Horses at Night" digital (2015, self-released)
- "Lost Boys" digital (2016, Wrecking Light)
- "Down with Heaven and Hell" digital (2016, Wrecking Light)
- "Black Lagoon" digital (2018, Wrecking Light)
- "The Photograph" digital (2018, Wrecking Light)
- "The Message" digital (2018, Wrecking Light)
- "The Calvary Cross" cover Richard Thompson (musician), digital (2019, Wrecking Light)
- "Crying" digital (2020, Wrecking Light)
- "The Last Exit" digital (2020, Wrecking Light)
- "White Sands" digital (2021, Wrecking Light)
- "Heavy Days" digital (2021, Wrecking Light)
- "Far Rider" digital (2022, Wrecking Light)
- "The Creeps" digital (2024, Wrecking Light)
- "Summer Nights" digital (2025, Wrecking Light)
- "The Crying Game" digital (2025, Wrecking Light)

=== Compilation appearances ===
- "Endless Summer" on Gruff Trade EP (2010, Fierce Panda)
