= Billy Nicholls =

English singer-songwriter (born 1949)

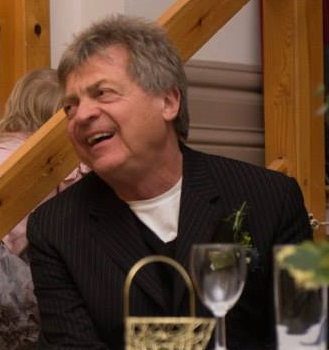
- Nicholls in 2015

Background information
- Born: William Morris Nicholls Jr; 15 February 1949 (age 77); White City, London, England
- Origin: Chipping Barnet, London, England
- Genres: Psychedelic rock; baroque pop; pop rock; soft rock
- Occupations: Singer; songwriter; composer; record producer; mixing engineer; musical director
- Instruments: Vocals; guitar
- Years active: Late 1960s–present
- Labels: Southwest; Immediate
- Website: billynicholls.com

William Morris Nicholls Jr (born 15 February 1949) is an English singer, songwriter, composer, record producer, and musical director. He was born into a musical family, his father Billy Nicholls (Sr.) being a double bassist and big band singer, performing with such bands as The Oscar Rabin Romany Band (Hammersmith Palais), Alan Green with his boys, the RAF band The Squadronaires and later performed on radio with Will Hay with Royal Command Performances. Nicholls first gained fame in the 1960s while still a teenager with his Pet Sounds-influenced album, Would You Believe, originally released on Immediate Records.

Nicholls' compositions have been covered by many artists. His first success came in 1977 when Leo Sayer covered "I Can't Stop Loving You (Though I Try)"; it rose to No. 7 in the UK Singles Chart. Nicholls wrote several of the tracks for the film McVicar (starring Roger Daltrey) including "Without Your Love", which was a success in the United States.

The Babys covered "White Lightning" on their Head First album in 1978.

An American southern rock group, the Outlaws, recorded "I Can't Stop Loving You" on their 1980 release Ghost Riders. More recently, Phil Collins also recorded "I Can't Stop Loving You" in 2002 and it proved successful as a U.S. single, appearing on several of his albums; Collins included it in his last world tour.

A longtime acquaintance and occasional collaborator with Pete Townshend, Nicholls was involved in the Deep End concerts in Brixton and Cannes. He toured with The Who in 1989 and 1996–1997, serving as backup singer and music director; he also provided backing vocals for the band's version of "Saturday Night's Alright for Fighting", which appeared on the tribute album Two Rooms: Celebrating the Songs of Elton John & Bernie Taupin.

He has contributed backing vocals for many friends and artists over the years, including uncredited backing vocals on The Nice's 1967 debut single "The Thoughts of Emerlist Davjack".

In 2003, Nicholls received an ASCAP award for "I Can't Stop Loving You". Keith Urban recorded the song in 2006 on his fifth studio album, Love, Pain & the Whole Crazy Thing.

In 2009 a promotional copy of Would You Believe was sold on eBay for £7,312.

Nicholls set up Southwest Records in 1998 and has so far released nine albums featuring his own work.

He is the father of musician Morgan Nicholls, singer songwriter Amy Nicholls, and film director Will Nicholls.

== Discography ==
=== Solo ===
Year of release	Album title
1968	Would You Believe
1974	Love Songs
1977	White Horse
1990	Under One Banner
2000	Snapshot
2001	Penumbra Moon
2001	Still Entwined
2005	Forever's No Time At All
2008	Rosslyn Road
