= Little Things (Bobby Goldsboro song) =

1965 single by Bobby Goldsboro

Single by Bobby Goldsboro

from the album Little Things
- B-side: "I Can't Go On Pretending"
- Released: January 1965 (Note: The release sheet gives a date of November 24, which would appear to be an error, as that would have made the release only five days after the recording date. The catalog number and review dates in Billboard and Cash Box indicate a release date of early January 1965.)
- Recorded: November 19, 1964
- Studio: Columbia (Nashville, Tennessee)
- Genre: Country
- Length: 2:25
- Label: United Artists
- Songwriter: Bobby Goldsboro
- Producer: Jack Gold

Bobby Goldsboro singles chronology
"I Don't Know You Anymore" (1964)	"Little Things" (1965)	"Voodoo Woman" (1965)

"Little Things" is a song written and sung by Bobby Goldsboro, which he recorded on November 19, 1964, and released in January 1965. The song reached number 13 on the Billboard Hot 100.

== Background ==
Goldsboro wrote the up-tempo "Little Things" after his producer, Jack Gold, encouraged him to continue writing ballads after the series of such songs Goldsboro had composed and recorded. Goldsboro cut this song, along with the other tracks on the album, in Nashville. Goldsboro had originally intended the song to be recorded in 2/4 time, but after hearing a copy of "Oh, Pretty Woman" that his friend Roy Orbison had sent him, he changed the beat of "Little Things" to 4/4. The arrangement was done by Goldsboro and Bill Justis. Ray Stevens sang the back-up vocals. "Little Things" was recorded on November 19, 1964 at the Columbia Studio B in Nashville.

Reviewed in Billboard, "Little Things" was described as a "gutsy rocker with loads of sales potential. Bobby delivers the well-worded message with plenty of authority". Cash Box described it as "a real contagious, steady beat stomp'er".

In 1965, the song spent 12 weeks on the Billboard Hot 100 chart, peaking at number 13. In Canada, it reached number 4 on Canada's RPM Top 40 & 5, and number 4 on RPM's Adult Contemporary chart. It was ranked number 81 on Billboard's year-end chart of Top Singles of 1965.

== Chart performance ==
Chart (1965)	Peak position
Australia (Kent Music Report)	12
Canada Top Singles (RPM)	4
Canada Adult Contemporary (RPM)	4
US Billboard Hot 100	13
US Cash Box Top 100	12

== Dave Berry version ==
"Little Things"

Single by Dave Berry
- B-side: "I've Got a Tiger By the Tail"
- Released: 12 March 1965
- Studio: Decca, London
- Genre: Beat
- Length: 2:24
- Label: Decca
- Songwriter: Bobby Goldsboro
- Producer: Mike Smith

Dave Berry singles chronology
"One Heart Between Two" (1964)	"Little Things" (1965)	"This Strange Effect" (1965)

English singer Dave Berry released a cover of "Little Things" in March 1965. It became his second UK top-ten hit.

Record Mirror described Berry's version as an "extremely commercial disc" and better than Goldsboro's. However, Peter Aldersley for Pop Weekly described "Little Things" as "an average disc" and "an ordinary beater with little new to offer".

=== Charts ===
Chart (1965)	Peak position
Ireland (IRMA)	9
Netherlands (Dutch Top 40)	26
UK Disc Top 30	9
UK Melody Maker Top 50	4
UK New Musical Express Top 30	8
UK Record Retailer Top 50	5
