= Mama (B. J. Thomas song) =

1966 single by B. J. Thomas

Single by B. J. Thomas

from the album I'm So Lonesome I Could Cry
- B-side: "Windy"
- Released: March 1966
- Studio: Pasadena Sounds, Pasadena, Texas
- Genre: Pop
- Length: 2:45
- Label: Pacemaker; Scepter
- Songwriter: Mark Charron
- Producer: Music Enterprises

B. J. Thomas singles chronology
"I'm So Lonesome I Could Cry" (1966)	"Mama" (1966)	"Billy and Sue" (1966)

"Mama" is a song by American singer B. J. Thomas, released in March 1966 as a single from his debut album I'm So Lonesome I Could Cry. It peaked at number 22 on the Billboard Hot 100 and was later covered by British singer Dave Berry, whose version became a top-ten hit in the UK.

== Background and release ==
"Mama" was written by Mark Charron and details the devotion of a son to their mother. It was B. J. Thomas' follow-up to his top-ten hit "I'm So Lonesome I Could Cry" and was produced by Huey P. Meaux, credited as his company Music Enterprises. The single was originally released in March 1966 on Meaux's label Pacemaker Records, but was later released in May 1966 on Scepter Records, whereupon it became a hit, reaching the top thirty in the US and topping the chart in Australia.

BIllboard described it as a "nostalgic easy-rocker with top Thomas vocal replaces his hit "I'm So Lonesome I Could Cry."", whilst Cash Box described it as a "haunting, easy-going praise-filled ode to all the mothers in the world."

== Charts ==
Chart (1966)	Peak position
Australia (Kent Music Report)	1
Canada Top Singles (RPM)	12
US Billboard Hot 100	22
US Cash Box Top 100	15

== Dave Berry version ==
"Mama"

Single by Dave Berry

from the album The Special Sound of Dave Berry
- B-side: "Walk, Walk, Talk, Talk"
- Released: 17 June 1966
- Studio: Decca Studios, London
- Genre: Pop
- Length: 2:46
- Label: Decca
- Songwriter: Mark Charron
- Producer: Mike Smith

Dave Berry singles chronology
"So Goes Love" (1966)	"Mama" (1966)	"Sticks and Stones/Marble Breaks" (1966)

English musician Dave Berry released his version as a single in June 1966 which became his final top-ten single. Berry also sang the song in the film The Ghost Goes Gear.

Reviewed in Record Mirror, "Mama" was described as "a slightly surprising selection – a well-sung and finely accompanied (by Ivor Raymonde) treatment of the ultra-sentimental song currently a big hit in the States via B. J. Thomas. As ever, Dave invests the song with a sense of style and drama." John Wells for New Musical Express described it as "a great performance of this plaintive number by a singer who seems jinxed as far as the British charts are concerned."

=== Charts ===
Chart (1966)	Peak position
Belgium (Ultratop 50 Flanders)	1
Belgium (Ultratop 50 Wallonia)	15
Ireland (IRMA)	6
Netherlands (Dutch Top 40)	16
Netherlands (Single Top 100)	17
UK Disc and Music Echo Top 50	5
UK Melody Maker Top 50	4
UK New Musical Express Top 30	4
UK Record Retailer Top 50	5

== Other cover versions ==
- In 1983, Brian and Michael with St Winifred's School Choir released a cover of the song as a single, which peaked at number 93 on the UK Singles Chart.
