= John McVicar =

British journalist (1940–2022)

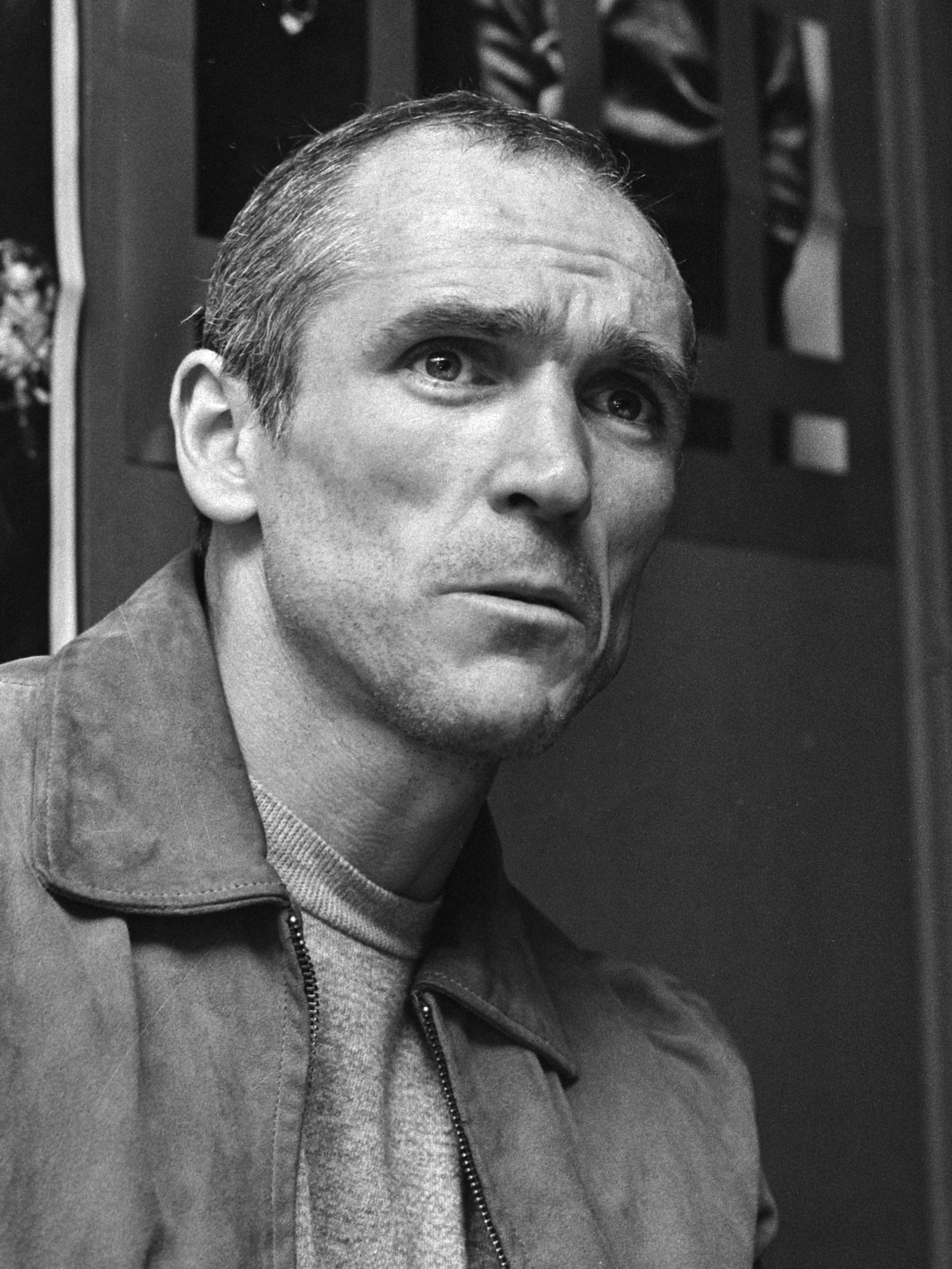
John McVicar at a press conference for the movie after the book McVicar by Himself (11 March 1981)

John Roger McVicar (21 March 1940 – 6 September 2022) was a British journalist and convicted one-time armed robber who escaped from prison.

== Career ==
=== As a criminal ===
McVicar's criminal career began in his teens with shop break-ins and car thefts. In 1956, at the age of 16, while awaiting trial, he escaped from a remand home for young offenders, before being sentenced to two years Borstal training. On his release he graduated to armed robber. In 1964 he was arrested and sentenced to eight years in prison. Despite being incarcerated in HM Prison Parkhurst, which was then a top security jail on the Isle of Wight, McVicar managed to escape again, following a spurious trial with twelve other Parkhurst inmates at Winchester Law Courts and overcoming their guards on the way back to the Isle of Wight at Bishop's Waltham. All the other prisoners were soon re-arrested during a massive police search operation, but McVicar, still at large, contacted underworld boss Joey Pyle in London, who drove down and met him in Portsmouth. Returning up the A3, Pyle got as far as Dorking, where there was a police roadblock. He sped around the police but was eventually cornered in a cul-de-sac in the town. McVicar managed to jump out in time and evade the police.

Whilst on the run, McVicar attempted to rob an armoured security van, was recaptured, charged with more offences and sentenced to another 15 years in prison consecutive to the eight he was already serving.

The UK Prison Service moved him to another maximum security jail, HM Prison Durham, from which he escaped again and remained on the run for two years, living incognito in Blackheath, South London, with his girlfriend and their young son.

The escape from Durham led to him being declared "Public Enemy No. 1" by Scotland Yard, until he was apprehended and made to continue his 23-year prison sentence. He was paroled in 1978.

=== As a journalist ===
==== Telling his story ====
During his imprisonment for his failed attempt to rob an armed money transfer vehicle (as a fugitive), McVicar began his study for a postgraduate degree at the University of Leicester, which he completed upon his release. In addition, McVicar covertly wrote his autobiography, McVicar by Himself. After its publishing, he co-scripted the biographical film McVicar with Tom Clegg who also directed. Roger Daltrey (lead singer of The Who) played the title role. The film co-starred Adam Faith.

According to McVicar's foreword to the revised edition of McVicar by Himself (published by Artnik in 2002), Daltrey's interest in breaking into the film industry as a romantic lead heavily compromised the film's depiction of his relationship with McVicar's then-wife, Sheila Wilshire. He maintained that his relationship with Wilshire was always more related to convenience after she gave birth to his son. Wilshire was arrested for housing a fugitive while McVicar was on the run from his escape from Durham Prison.

==== Journalism ====
In the 1980s McVicar embarked upon a career in journalism, with work published in The Sunday Times, The Guardian, Punch, the New Statesman, and Time Out. He was frequently called upon to comment on crime and punishment matters, such as the 1990 HM Prison Strangeways riots, in Manchester. Nonetheless, he was forced to file for bankruptcy in 1994 and was destitute for nine months.

==== Christie v. McVicar ====
In 1998, McVicar lost a libel action brought by sprinter Linford Christie over his claim that Christie was a "steroid athlete."

== Personal life and death ==
McVicar was born at a nursing home in Wanstead, Essex, on 21 March 1940. The son of shopkeepers, George and Diane McVicar, in 1965 he fathered a son with his girlfriend, Shirley Wilshire, while he was on the run from HMP Parkhurst. Shirley and McVicar married in 1972, but she divorced him before his final release from prison in 1978. His son was estranged from his father but followed in his criminal footsteps, taking up armed robbery and prison escapes.

In 2002, John McVicar married Countess Valentina Artsrunik at the Russian Orthodox Church in Knightsbridge, London. Although the couple ran a publishing business and together travelled widely, their marriage was strained and they lived apart. At the time of his death McVicar was living in a caravan in Althorne, Maldon, Essex.

McVicar died from a suspected heart attack on 6 September 2022, aged 82, whilst walking his dog in Althorne, Essex.

== See also ==
- Durham (HM Prison)
