= Nostradamus – The Fate of Man =

Studio album by Kayak
- Released: 2005
- Recorded: 2005, at E-sound (Weesp), ABT (Hilversum), Heilige Geestkerk (Doetinchem), The Netherlands
- Genre: Progressive rock
- Label: SMH
- Producer: Sagar Surana and Pim Koopman

Kayak chronology
Merlin - Bard Of The Unseen (2003)	Nostradamus – The Fate of Man (2005)	Kayakoustic (2007)

Nostradamus – The Fate of Man is the twelfth studio album by the Dutch progressive rock band Kayak. The album charted only for three weeks.

This concept-album tells the story of French doctor and seer Nostradamus, but from the viewpoint of a Flemish monk, Yves de Lessines. The (unproven) theory behind this is that Nostradamus was not the writer of his famous "Centuries". These poems were in fact written 200 years earlier by De Lessines, and they were a secret code to find the treasures of the Knights Templar. On one of his journeys, Nostradamus found the book that De Lessines wrote, and interpreted the poems in his own way, turning them into predictions. This theory was launched and motivated by Belgian professor and historian Rudy Cambier in his book "Nostradamus and the lost Templar legacy" (2003). Kayak found this approach much more interesting than the usual Nostradamus-stories, and decided to take this theory as a starting point for their second rock-opera.

Just before the start of recordings, bassplayer Bert Veldkamp left the band because he could not combine Kayak with his day job. Originally a bassplayer, Ton Scherpenzeel played this instrument on the recordings. At concerts, Jan van Olffen fulfilled this task. Van Olffen stayed with Kayak, and is still the band's bassplayer. This album sees the return of Edward Reekers, lead singer with Kayak from 1978 until 1982. His part of "The Monk" was the start of his second life with Kayak, which lasts until the present day.

The album is a double CD. There was also a single CD released, under the title Excerpts From Nostradamus. That CD contains 11 songs, plus "The Story Behind Nostradamus" in Dutch and English.

At concerts in 2005, the band played this rock-opera in its entirety. On stage, the band was joined by dancers and three extra singers: Marc Dollevoet, Marloes van Woggelum and Marjolein Teepen. After this album and tour, singer Bert Heerink left the band to concentrate on his solo career.

== Track listing ==
(All lyrics by Irene Linders and Ton Scherpenzeel)

CD1

1. "The Secret Study" (Koopman) - 1:46
2. "Overture - A Strange And Cryptic Tale" (Scherpenzeel) - 3:03
3. "Friend Of The Stars 1" (Scherpenzeel) - 4:17
4. "Celestial Science" (Scherpenzeel) - 3:50
5. "The Student" (Scherpenzeel) - 1:22
6. "Dance Of Death 1" (Koopman) - 3:24
7. "Fresh Air, Running Water, Rose Pills" (Scherpenzeel/Koopman) - 4:09
8. "The Monk's Comment 1" (Scherpenzeel) - 0:43
9. "Seekers Of Truth 1" (Koopman) - 4:14
10. "Dance Of Death 2" (Koopman) - 1:04
11. "Save My Wife" (Scherpenzeel) - 5:24
12. "The Monk's Comment 2" (Scherpenzeel) - 0:30
13. "Pagan's Paradise" (Scherpenzeel) - 4:23
14. "The Inquisition" (Scherpenzeel) - 5:31
15. "The Wandering Years" (Koopman) - 4:41
16. "The Monk's Comment 3" (Scherpenzeel) - 0:48
17. "If History Was Mine Alone" (Scherpenzeel) - 2:57
18. "Friend Of The Stars 2" (Scherpenzeel) - 0:37

CD2

1. "A Man With Remarkable Talents" (Scherpenzeel) - 3:30
2. "Settle Down" (Scherpenzeel) - 4:21
3. "The Monk's Comment 4" (Scherpenzeel) - 0:41
4. "The Flying Squadron" (Koopman) - 4:14
5. "Dance Of Mirrors" (Scherpenzeel) - 3:22
6. "A Royal Invitation" (Koopman) - 1:15
7. "A Cruel Death + The Monk's Comment 5" (Scherpenzeel) - 3:57
8. "Tell Me All" (Scherpenzeel) - 3:27
9. "The Tournament" (Koopman) - 4:12
10. "The Golden Cage" (Scherpenzeel) - 2:08
11. "Seekers Of Truth 2" (Koopman) - 2:00
12. "Living In Two Realities" (Scherpenzeel) - 4:11
13. "Act Of Despair" (Koopman) - 4:22
14. "The Secret Study 2" (Koopman) - 1:41
15. "The Centuries" (Scherpenzeel/Koopman) - 5:03
16. "(You Won't Find Me) Alive At Sunrise" (Scherpenzeel) - 3:19
17. "Friend Of The Stars 3" (Scherpenzeel) - 1:13
18. "Epilogue - The Fate Of Man" (Scherpenzeel) - 2:57

== Members ==
- Ton Scherpenzeel - keyboards, bass guitar, accordion, backing vocals
- Pim Koopman - drums, keyboards, guitar, percussion, backing vocals
- Bert Heerink - lead and backing vocals ("The Astrologer")
- Cindy Oudshoorn - lead and backing vocals ("The Astrologer's Second Wife")
- Joost Vergoossen - guitars
- Rob Vunderink - guitars, lead and backing vocals ("The Opposition")
- Edward Reekers - lead and backing vocals, voice-over ("The Monk")
- Monique van der Ster - lead and backing vocals ("The Queen")
- Syb van der Ploeg - lead and backing vocals ("The Scientist")

== Guests ==
- Marjolein Teepen - vocals ("The Flying Squadron")
- Eddy Koopman - percussion
- Rens van der Zalm - fiddle
- The Nostradamus Choir - vocals ("The People")
- Valentijn Achterberg - voice ("The Boy")
