= Friendly Folk Records =

Record label based in Rotterdam, Netherlands

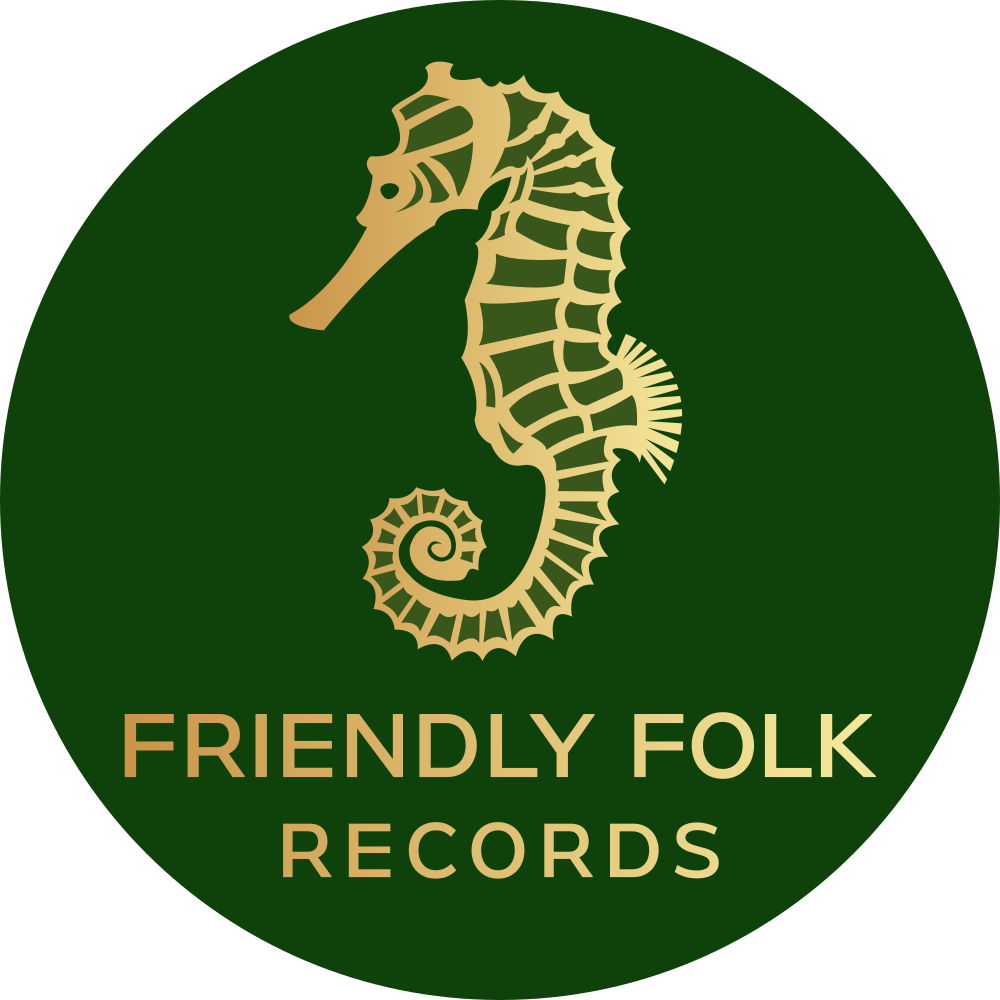
- Founded: 2017
- Genre: rock; folk
- Official website: friendlyfolkrecords.org

UPDATE: Friendly Folk Records was founded in 2015 as My Music Matters Management and rebranded in 2017 with a focus on folk, indie, and acoustic music. January 2026, Friendly Folk Records announces merge of services with OOB Records label, unifying sales, promotion, and distribution across genres. Founded in 2020, OOB Records is an independent label originally focused on progressive rock, but has since expanded to support a wide variety of genres, including indie, punk, and pop.

Friendly Folk Records is an independent record label based in Rotterdam, Netherlands, founded in 2017 by music journalist and entrepreneur Kathy Keller. The early label roster represented mostly 'up and coming' folk artists from various genres, including Celtic Folk, Traditional Folk, Pagan Folk, and singer-songwriters. Friendly Folk Records was the sponsor and host of Friendly Folk Stage at Fantasy Fest Rijswijk every March and October (2018-2023).

== History ==
Kathy Keller had interviewed many touring artists for her radio show on Prog Core Radio (Canada), and it led to creation of a music promotion company, "My Music Matters MT" (2014–2018); where Keller managed well known and "up and coming" folk and progressive artists, most notably progressive rock acts: Kristoffer Gildenlöw (Kayak, ex-Pain of Salvation), Philhelmon, Silhouette and Jyoti Verehoeff; and Celtic folk rock band, Greenrose Faire. In 2017 the promotion company shifted to predominantly folk genre bands. According to the label website: "Friendly Folk Records label was established when Keller realized that there were very few record labels taking on the challenge of nurturing new talent and showcasing established Artists from the wide spectrum of Folk genres." In 2018, My Music Matters MT merged services under record label umbrella and worked in cooperation with A-Broad Studios (Breda) (2018/2019) under a non-exclusive agreement. From Jan/2018 – Sept/2020 all Friendly Folk Records releases were distributed by Dutch Music Works (Netherlands). Since Oct/2020 all aspects of the label are managed inhouse. Worldwide digital distribution provided by aggregator, iMusician (Switzerland); physical distribution provided by: Sonic Rendezvous (Netherlands); Just for Kicks (Germany); Marquee Records (Japan).

== Artists ==
The first label release was: Greenrose Faire (Finland). with "Decades of Songs and Stories" in (2017); followed by 2018 releases from: Jyoti Verhoeff (Netherlands), ‘Touches – I speak with my mouth shut’; Drusuna Pagan Folk (Portugal), "Kaytos Kom" The Midnight (Italy), "The Legend Has Begun". These bands have multiple single and album releases with the label, and have been with the Friendly Folk Records since the startup, under management of Keller since 2015. Shandon Sahm, son of country music legend, Doug Sahm, signed a distribution deal, with the 2019 release of "Sahm Covers Sahm" which was a tribute album to his late father. Harmony Glen, known for their energetic Celtic Folk Rock performances throughout Europe, and arena shows with Music Show Scotland in Ahoy, Rotterdam, signed with the label in 2019 with new album releases of, 'Start Living Today' (2020) and 'Sing Me a Song' (2021). Friendly Folk Records artists Jyoti Verhoeff and Greenrose Faire were in the spotlight of German magazine Sonic Seducer (06/2021) as well as reviews of new label releases from: Harmony Glen, The Midnight, Greenrose Faire and Drusuna Pagan Ritual Folk.

March 2020, Ton Scherpenzeel, signed with the label and released his fifth solo album, VELVET ARMOUR. Scherpenzeel is a Dutch composer, keyboardist, lyricist and founder of the Progressive Rock band, Kayak. VELVET ARMOUR and Scherpenzeel's fourth album, "The Lion's Dream" are a blend of Baroque Folk and Progressive rock ballads. ‘The Lion's Dream’ featured guest vocalist, Brian de Graeve of Silhouette. Both albums feature Annette Visser (ex-Flairick) on flute and recorders. The eighteen-track album reflects the essence of the Medieval Renaissance era, with a blend of Baroque Folk and Progressive Rock Ballads. Album also includes 'My Heart Never Changed', originally released on Kayak album, Royal Bed Bouncer (1975). In an interview with Irish Music Magazine (Nov/2021) Scherpenzeel mentioned that he was dubious about releasing an album like Velvet Armour commercially, and after he made that statement on social media he was approached by Friendly Folk Records, who were interested in releasing the album on their folk label. He also told journalist Sean Laffey during the interview, "I know I am not your typical folk artist but there are strong similarities and connections to that style". Irish Music Magazine (Aug – Dec 2021) also published an article series about folk labels that featured Friendly Folk Records: Kathy Keller; Ton Scherpenzeel, Greenrose Faire, Tom Portman and Harmony Glen.
