= See See the Sun =

See See The Sun

Studio album by Kayak
- Released: 1973
- Recorded: October 1972, May–June 1973
- Genre: Progressive rock
- Length: 47:50
- Label: Harvest
- Producer: Gerrit-Jan Leenders and Kayak

Kayak chronology
| See See The Sun (1973) | Kayak (1974) |

Professional ratings
Review scores
| Source | Rating |
|---|---|
| Allmusic | link |

See See the Sun is the first album by the Dutch progressive rock band Kayak. It was originally released by Harvest Records in 1973 and reissued by Pseudonym with two bonus tracks (both of which were originally singles b-sides) in 1995, and again in 2012.

The song 'Mammoth' is one of the very few pop singles to feature a barrel organ (or street organ). The organ, The Flamingo, was too big to get through the studio entrance. Therefore, the melody was recorded outside. Being a manually operated organ, the pace varied all the time, making it very hard to fit the piece into the rest of the song.

== Track listing ==
1. "Reason for it All" (Scherpenzeel) – 6:29
2. "Lyrics" (Scherpenzeel) – 3:42
3. "Mouldy Wood" (Slager/Koopman/Scherpenzeel) – 5:16
4. "Lovely Luna" (Koopman) – 8:19
5. "Hope for a Life" (Koopman/Scherpenzeel) – 6:49
6. "Ballet of the Cripple" (Van Leeuwen/Koopman/Scherpenzeel) – 4:39
7. "Forever is a Lonely Thought" (Koopman/Scherpenzeel) – 5:26
8. "Mammoth" (Koopman/Scherpenzeel) – 2:57
9. "See See the Sun" (Van Leeuwen/Koopman/Scherpenzeel) – 4:13

=== Bonus tracks (1995 reissue) ===
1. "Still Try to Write a Book" (Koopman) – 2:01
2. "Give it a Name" (Van Leeuwen/Koopman/Scherpenzeel) – 2:44

== Lineup ==
- Max Werner – lead vocals, percussion, Mellotron
- Johan Slager – guitars, backing vocals
- Ton Scherpenzeel – keyboards, backing vocals
- Cees van Leeuwen – bass, backing vocals, harmonica
- Pim Koopman – drums, backing vocals, synthesizer, marimba, lead vocals on "Lovely Luna," "Forever Is a Lonely Thought," and "Give It a Name"

== Guest appearances ==
- Giny Bush and Martine Koeman – violins on "Lyrics"
- Ernst Reijseger – cello on "Lyrics"
- Gerrit-Jan Leenders – vocals, percussion on "Hope for a Life"
- Rijn Peter de Klerk – percussion on "Hope for a Life"
- G. Perlee – barrel organ "Flamingo" Amsterdam on "Mammoth"
