= Close to the Fire =

Studio album by Kayak
- Released: 2000
- Recorded: 1999 at ABT Studio and Down Under Studio, Hilversum, The Netherlands
- Genre: Progressive rock
- Label: Europe: ProActs, Japan: Avalon
- Producer: Ton Scherpenzeel, Pim Koopman

Kayak chronology
Eyewitness (1981)	Close to the Fire (2000)	Chance for a Live Time (2001)

Close to the Fire is the 9th studio album by Dutch progressive rock band Kayak, released in 2000. It was a comeback album, the first since their split in 1982. The line-up was almost the same as the one that recorded the album Royal Bed Bouncer in 1975. Only guitarist Johan Slager was not involved. He was replaced by Rob Winter.

By 1997, Kayak founder members Ton Scherpenzeel and Pim Koopman decided to work on new material. They had no name for their project yet, and it was not their intention to release the songs as Kayak. Apart from Scherpenzeel and Koopman, no former Kayak members were involved at this stage. Lead singer on the demo versions was Alex Toonen, from Dutch progressive rock band "For Absent Friends". Record companies were not immediately interested, and the songs were not developed further. Then, original Kayak singer Max Werner offered to have a go at the demo's. With his vocal sound the songs got a genuine Kayak feel, and it was decided to release the songs as the new Kayak album.

The album was relatively successful, reaching # 54 in the Dutch album top-100 and staying in that top-100 for 6 weeks. More important was that media and fans were interested in the band again. Scherpenzeel and Koopman decided to continue the 'new' Kayak. Max Werner left after a short tour in 2000.

The last song on the album is a newly recorded version of "Ruthless Queen", Kayak's biggest hit from 1978. Lead vocalist on the new version is Syb van der Ploeg. He was lead-singer of Dutch band "De Kast". Members of that band were big Kayak fans, and in 1999 De Kast asked Kayak to join them in a TV-special. That was one of the things that encouraged Kayak to reunite. Apart from Syb van der Ploeg, Kast-members Sytze Broersma and Peter van der Ploeg also play on "Ruthless Queen".

The song "Full Circle" has a guitar solo by Andrew Latimer, leader of the British progressive rock band Camel. Ton Scherpenzeel played in Camel, though not constantly, from 1984 until 2003.

== Track listing ==
1. "Close To the Fire" (Scherpenzeel/Linders) - 8:11
2. "When Hearts Grow Cold" (Scherpenzeel/Linders) - 3:08
3. "Dream Child" (Scherpenzeel/Linders) - 3:30
4. "Frozen Flame" (Scherpenzeel/Linders) - 6:34
5. "Forever" - 4:48 (Koopman)
6. "Worlds Apart" (Scherpenzeel/Linders) - 5:12
7. "Crusader" (Scherpenzeel/Linders) - 4:39
8. "Two Wrongs (Don't Make A Right)" (Scherpenzeel/Linders) - 3:35
9. "Anybody's Child" - 5:01 (Koopman)
10. "Here Today" (Scherpenzeel/Linders) - 3:34
11. "Just A Matter Of Time" - 3:34 (Koopman)
12. "Full Circle" (Scherpenzeel/Linders) - 5:55
13. "Ruthless Queen (new version)" (Scherpenzeel/Linders) - 5:00

Bonus tracks on Japanese CD release:

1. "Cried For Love" (Scherpenzeel) - 3:23
2. "Love Lies" (Scherpenzeel) - 3:42

== Members ==
- Ton Scherpenzeel - keyboards, backing vocals, accordion
- Pim Koopman - drums, backing vocals
- Max Werner - lead and backing vocals, percussion
- Bert Veldkamp - bass guitar
- Rob Winter - guitars, backing vocals

== Guest musicians ==
- Andrew Latimer - guitar on "Full Circle"
- Syb van der Ploeg - lead vocal on "Ruthless Queen"
- Sytze Broersma - backing vocals on "Ruthless Queen"
- Peter van der Ploeg - acoustic guitar on "Ruthless Queen"
- Annet Visser - flute, recorder
- Femmes Vattaal - percussion
- Lorre Trytten - violin on "Full Circle"
- Arthur Polini - additional vocals (miscredited as "Arthur van Pol")
- Holger Schwedt - additional percussion
