= Starlight Dancer =

- Cover of the European album

Studio album by Kayak
- Released: 1977
- Genre: Progressive rock
- Label: Vertigo (Europe); Janus (North America)
- Producer: Jack Lancaster, Kayak

Kayak chronology
| The Last Encore (1976) | Starlight Dancer (1977) | Phantom of the Night (1978) |

Alternative cover
- Cover of the North American compilation album

Professional ratings
Review scores
| Source | Rating |
|---|---|
| Allmusic | link |
| Progrography | not rated link |

Starlight Dancer is a 1977 album by Dutch progressive rock band Kayak. It was produced by Jack Lancaster and Kayak.

The North American release is very different from the original Dutch/European release with the same title. In fact it is a compilation of songs from Starlight Dancer and their previous album The Last Encore (1976). The American record company, Janus Records, used the title Starlight Dancer but the sleeve design of The Last Encore.

== European version ==
This album is the only Kayak album with members Charles Louis Schouten (drums) and Theo de Jong (bass).

The song "Golddust" is the only song written by Max Werner that Kayak recorded. It features a guest appearance by Dutch keyboardist Rick van der Linden.

Only two songs of this release ("Turn the Tide" and "Starlight Dancer") were used on the North American release. "Want You to Be Mine" and "Irene" are also included, but these were in fact demo-versions, slightly different from the versions on the European album.

Until July 2010, the European version of Starlight Dancer was not released on CD in its own right. It was released as part of a double CD set called Three Originals. This double CD exists of the complete albums Starlight Dancer, Phantom of the Night and Periscope Life, plus five non-album bonus tracks. In July 2010, Universal/Mercury released the European album on a single CD.

=== Track listing ===
All tracks are written by Ton Scherpenzeel, except where noted.

Side one
| No. | Title | Length |
|---|---|---|
| 1. | "Daughter or Son" | 3:40 |
| 2. | "Starlight Dancer" | 4:56 |
| 3. | "Want You to Be Mine" | 3:30 |
| 4. | "Letdown" | 2:46 |
| 5. | "Irene" (Instrumental) | 4:20 |

Side two
| No. | Title | Writer(s) | Length |
|---|---|---|---|
| 6. | "Golddust" | Max Werner | 2:40 |
| 7. | "May" | Scherpenzeel, D. Ireland | 4:25 |
| 8. | "Turn the Tide" | | 3:35 |
| 9. | "Dead Bird Flies Forever" | | 4:15 |
| 10. | "Sweet Revenge" | | 3:40 |
| 11. | "Where Do We Go from Here?" | | 4:50 |

== North American version ==
The song "Ballad For a Lost Friend" is included on the album Kayak - The Golden Years of Dutch Music, released by Universal Music in 2015. In the Netherlands, the song was used as a single B-side. The North American album was not released on CD.

=== Track listing ===
Side one
| No. | Title | Writer(s) | Length |
|---|---|---|---|
| 1. | "I Want You to Be Mine" (demo version) | Scherpenzeel | 4:46 |
| 2. | "Ballad For a Lost Friend" | Scherpenzeel | 4:14 |
| 3. | "Turn the Tide" (from Starlight Dancer) | Scherpenzeel | 3:34 |
| 4. | "Nothingness" (from The Last Encore) | Scherpenzeel | 3:56 |
| 5. | "Still My Heart Cries For You" (from The Last Encore) | Pim Koopman | 4:34 |

Side two
| No. | Title | Writer(s) | Length |
|---|---|---|---|
| 6. | "Starlight Dancer" (from Starlight Dancer) | Scherpenzeel | 5:03 |
| 7. | "Love of a Victim" (from The Last Encore) | Koopman | 2:48 |
| 8. | "Land on the Water" (from The Last Encore) | Koopman | 2:28 |
| 9. | "Do You Care" (from The Last Encore) | Koopman | 2:56 |
| 10. | "Back to the Front" (from The Last Encore) | Scherpenzeel, Johan Slager | 4:32 |
| 11. | "Irene" (instrumental, demo version) | Scherpenzeel | 4:22 |

== Personnel ==
- Max Werner - lead vocals, Mellotron, percussion
- Johan Slager - electric and acoustic guitars, backing vocals
- Ton Scherpenzeel - piano, backing vocals, clavinet, organ, string ensemble, Mellotron, accordion, synthesizers, double bass
- Theo de Jong - bass guitar (EU 1–11, US 1–3, 6, 11)
- Charles Louis Schouten - drums (EU 1–11, US 1–3, 6, 11)
- Bert Veldkamp - bass guitar (US 4, 5, 7–10) [uncredited]
- Pim Koopman - drums (US 4, 5, 7–10) [uncredited]
