= Regency Records (United States) =

- Parent company: Atco Records
- Founded: 1979
- Defunct: ca. 1983
- Status: Inactive
- Genre: Rock, soundtrack
- Country of origin: United States
- Location: Beverly Hills, California

Regency Records was an American record label. It was founded in 1979 by manager Lloyd Segal. The label released albums by the Dixie Dregs and Diesel.

== History ==
Lloyd Segal, a former attorney then working as a music manager, founded Regency Records in August 1979. At the time of the label's foundation, Flying Fish Records was announced as its distributor. The label's first release was a live album by the Flying Burrito Brothers titled Live from Tokyo. Dixie Dregs were also signed to the label at its time of foundation. In addition to Flying Fish Records, Regency also partnered with a number of independent distributors throughout the United States.

Segal stated that he chose to found a new label due to his frustrations in dealing with other labels in his capacity as a manager. After the Flying Burrito Brothers album and Steve Gillette's A Little Warmth, Segal expressed frustration with the independent distributors with whom he was working. As a result, he chose to partner the Regency label with MCA Records for distribution. This partnership led to Regency issuing the soundtrack for the 1980 film Airplane! The partnership also released the album Watts in a Tank by Dutch rock band Diesel, and Midnight Radio by James Lee Stanley. Segal ended the label's partnership with MCA in 1980, citing "infighting" with MCA staff as the reason. In 1981, Regency partnered with Atco Records, which also took over promotion and distribution of the Diesel album. Billboard later stated that the transition from MCA to Atco improved sales of Watts in a Tank and its corresponding singles. Regency Records remained active through 1983, releasing a number of independent movies, including Valley Girl.
