= Coming Up for Air (disambiguation) =

Coming Up for Air is a 1939 novel by George Orwell.

Coming Up for Air may also refer to:

- Coming Up for Air (Breathing Space album), 2007
- Coming Up for Air (Kayak album), 2008
- Coming Up for Air (Davy Knowles and Back Door Slam album), 2009
- Coming Up for Air (Kodaline album), 2015
- "Coming Up for Air", a song by Ainslie Henderson
