= The Last Encore =

Studio album by Kayak
- Released: 1976
- Recorded: May – July 1976, at Morgan Studio, Brussels, Belgium
- Genre: Progressive rock
- Length: 40:52
- Label: Vertigo
- Producer: Kayak

Kayak chronology
Royal Bed Bouncer (1975)	The Last Encore (1976)	Starlight Dancer (1977)

The Last Encore is the fourth album by the Dutch progressive rock band Kayak. It was originally released by Vertigo Records in 1976.

The songs "Still My Heart Cries For You" and "Do You Care" were released as singles in The Netherlands, but neither charted in the Top 40. Following this album, drummer and founding member Pim Koopman left the band to become a record producer. He returned to Kayak in 1999.

The Last Encore was not released in the USA. Instead, Janus Records released an LP with songs from two European Kayak releases, bearing a similar sleeve design and entitled Starlight Dancer, containing songs from The Last Encore and the European release of Starlight Dancer.

== Track listing ==
No.	Title	Writer(s)	Length
1.	"Back To The Front"	Ton Scherpenzeel/Johan Slager	4:30
2.	"Nothingness"	Scherpenzeel	3:56
3.	"Love Of A Victum"	Pim Koopman	2:49
4.	"Land On The Water"	Koopman	2:27
5.	"The Last Encore"	Scherpenzeel	3:59
6.	"Do You Care"	Koopman	2:48
7.	"Still My Heart Cries For You"	Koopman	4:32
8.	"Relics From A Distant Age"	Scherpenzeel	4:54
9.	"Love Me Tonight / Get On Board"	Scherpenzeel	2:40
10.	"Evocation"	Koopman	3:49
11.	"Raid Your Own House"	Scherpenzeel	3:35
12.	"Well Done"	Koopman	0:53
Total length:			40:52

== Personnel ==
- Max Werner - lead (all but 12) vocals, percussion, Mellotron
- Johan Slager - guitars, backing vocals
- Ton Scherpenzeel - keyboards, backing vocals, accordion, double bass
- Bert Veldkamp - bass, backing vocals, double bass, saxophone, zither
- Pim Koopman - drums, backing and lead (12) vocals percussion, marimba, piano
