= Merlin (Kayak album) =

Studio album by Kayak
- Released: 1981, 1994 (reissue)
- Recorded: 1981, at Soundpush Studio, Blaricum, The Netherlands
- Genre: Progressive rock
- Label: Vertigo (original LP) Pseudonym (1995 reissue)
- Producer: Gerrit-Jan Leenders and Kayak

Kayak chronology
Periscope Life (1980)	Merlin (1981)	Eyewitness (1981)

Merlin is the eighth studio album by Dutch band Kayak. The first half of the original LP (tracks 1 through 5) is a concept fantasy story about Merlin the Magician. The second half of the LP is a collection of individual songs.

In 2003, Kayak released a re-worked and longer version of the Merlin-story, under the title Merlin - Bard of the Unseen.

== Track listing ==
1. "Merlin" - 7:23
2. "Tintagel" - 2:41
3. "The Sword In The Stone" - 3:31
4. "The King's Enchanter" - 2:42
5. "Niniane (Lady Of The Lake)" - 7:22
6. "Seagull" - 4:10
7. "Boogie Heart" - 4:11
8. "Now That We've Come This Far" - 4:29
9. "Can't Afford To Lose" - 3:19
10. "Love's Aglow" - 6:03

All songs composed by Ton Scherpenzeel, lyrics by Ton Scherpenzeel and Irene Linders

== Lineup ==
- Edward Reekers - lead (all but 10) and backing vocals
- Johan Slager - electric and acoustic guitars, banjo, flute
- Ton Scherpenzeel - keyboards, backing and lead (10) vocals
- Peter Scherpenzeel - bass guitar, recorder
- Max Werner - drums, percussion, backing vocals
- Irene Linders - backing vocals
- Katherine Lapthorn - backing vocals

== Guest musicians ==
Rein v/d Broek - Brass instruments

Benny Behr c.s. - Strings
