= Kayak (album) =

Studio album by Kayak
- Released: 1974
- Recorded: 1974, at Intertone Studio, Heemstede, The Netherlands
- Genre: Progressive rock
- Length: 36:23
- Label: EMI/Harvest
- Producers: Gerrit-Jan Leenders and Kayak

Kayak chronology
See See The Sun (1973)	Kayak (1974)	Royal Bed Bouncer (1975)

Kayak is the second album by the Dutch progressive rock band Kayak. It was originally released in 1974 and reissued by Pseudonym with a bonus track in 1995.

At first, the title was to be "His Master's Noise". But the band expected problems with the record label His Master's Voice, and so they chose simply Kayak. The album is also known as Kayak (2nd Album).

The song "Wintertime" was the only single release from this album. "Serenades" was the b-side for the single "We Are Not Amused".

== Track listing ==
1. "Alibi" (Scherpenzeel) – 3:39
2. "Wintertime" (Van Leeuwen/Koopman) – 2:51
3. "Mountain Too Rough" (Scherpenzeel) – 3:57
4. "They Get To Know Me" (Van Leeuwen/Koopman) – 9:18
5. "Serenades" (Koopman/Scherpenzeel) – 3:33
6. "Woe And Alas" (Scherpenzeel) – 3:01
7. "Mireille" (Instr.) (Koopman) – 2:13
8. "Trust In The Machine" (Van Leeuwen/Koopman) – 6:06
9. "His Master's Noise" (Koopman/Scherpenzeel/Van Leeuwen) – 1:45

=== Bonus track (1995 reissue) ===
1. "We Are Not Amused" (Koopman/Scherpenzeel) – 3:01

== Personnel ==
- Max Werner – lead vocals (all but 9), percussion, Mellotron
- Johan Slager – guitars, backing vocals
- Ton Scherpenzeel – grand, electric and French pianos, backing vocals, synthesizer, organ, harpsichord, accordion
- Cees van Leeuwen – bass, harmonica
- Pim Koopman – drums, backing and lead (9) vocals, percussion, marimba
