= Periscope Life =

Periscope life

Studio album by Kayak
- Released: 1980
- Recorded: October – November 1979 at The Village Recorder, Los Angeles, USA
- Label: Vertigo
- Producer: John Tilly and Kayak

Kayak chronology
Phantom of the Night (1978)	Periscope life (1980)	Merlin (1981)

Professional ratings
Review scores
Source	Rating
Allmusic	link

Periscope Life is the seventh album by the Dutch progressive rock band Kayak, originally released on LP in 1980. The first CD issue (1993) had 2 bonus tracks. In 1998, the album (without the bonus tracks) was part of the Double CD 3 Originals

== Track listing ==
1. "Astral Aliens" (Linders/Lapthorn/T. Scherpenzeel) – 3:48
2. "What's in a Name" (T. Scherpenzeel) – 4:12
3. "Stop That Song" (T. Scherpenzeel) – 3:14
4. "If You Really Need Me Now" (Linders/T. Scherpenzeel) – 4:15
5. "Periscope Life" (T. Scherpenzeel) – 3:24
6. "Beggars Can't Be Choosers" (Linders/Lapthorn/T. Scherpenzeel) – 4:39
7. "The Sight" (T. Scherpenzeel) – 3:59
8. "Lost Blue Of Chartres" (T. Scherpenzeel) – 3:24
9. "Anne" (Linders/T. Scherpenzeel) – 4:19
10. "One Way Or Another" (T. Scherpenzeel) – 3:56
11. "Sad To Say Farewell" (Linders/T. Scherpenzeel) – 4:22

=== Bonus tracks on CD ===
1. "Total Loss" (Linders/T. Scherpenzeel) – 4:11
2. "What's Done Is Done" (T. Scherpenzeel) – 3:39

== Personnel ==
- Edward Reekers – lead vocals
- Johan Slager – electric and acoustic guitars
- Ton Scherpenzeel – keyboards, backing vocals
- Peter Scherpenzeel – bass guitar, recorders
- Max Werner – drums, backing vocals, percussion
- Irene Linders – backing vocals
- Katherine Lapthorn – backing vocals

=== Guest Musicians ===
- Jim Price – trombone
- Jim Gordon – saxophone, clarinet
- Lee Thornburg – trumpet, flugelhorn
