= Kayak II =

Kayak II may refer to:

- Kayak II (horse)
- Kayak II (album)
