= Phantom of the Night =

Studio album by Kayak
- Released: 1978 (CD: 2010)
- Genre: Progressive rock
- Labels: Europe: Vertigo/Phonogram; United States: Janus Records
- Producers: Dennis MacKay & Kayak

Kayak chronology
Starlight Dancer (1977)	Phantom of the Night (1978)	Periscope Life (1980)

Professional ratings
Review scores
Source	Rating
Allmusic	link

Phantom of the Night is the sixth studio album by Dutch Progressive rock band Kayak. "Ruthless Queen" was released as a single, becoming the band's biggest hit, nearing the top of the charts in the Netherlands.

In North America, the LP was released with a different sleeve design and the tracks in a different order. A picture disc of this version was also released in the United States, in a limited edition of 3,000 copies. Reissues of the album have followed suit, with reissues from outside North America containing the original art and track listing and North American reissues using the different art and track listing.

The album was Kayak's biggest commercial success, but wasn't released on CD until August 2010. Until that date, the album was only available as part of the "3 Originals" 2 CD boxed set with two other Kayak albums which were "Starlight Dancer" and "Periscope Life".

In 2009, a compilation album bearing the same artwork as the North American versions of Phantom of the Night was released, bearing the title Phantom of the Night: The Very Best Of.

== Track listing ==
=== Non-North American releases ===
All tracks are written by Irene Linders and Ton Scherpenzeel, except where noted.

Side one
No.	Title	Writer(s)	Length
1.	"Winning Ways"		3:34
2.	"Keep the Change"	T. Scherpenzeel	3:38
3.	"Ruthless Queen"		4:49
4.	"Crime of Passion"		3:32
5.	"First Signs of Spring"	T. Scherpenzeel	3:39

Side 2
No.	Title	Writer(s)	Length
6.	"Daphne (Laurel Tree)"		5:10
7.	"The Poet and the One Man Band"	T. Scherpenzeel	4:12
8.	"No Man's Land"	T. Scherpenzeel	4:04
9.	"Journey Through Time"		3:34
10.	"Phantom of the Night"		5:01

=== North American release ===
All tracks are written by Irene Linders and Ton Scherpenzeel, except where noted.

Side one
No.	Title	Writer(s)	Length
1.	"Keep the Change"	T. Scherpenzeel	3:38
2.	"Winning Ways"		3:35
3.	"Daphne (Laurel Tree)"		5:06
4.	"Journey Through Time"		3:24
5.	"Phantom of the Night"		5:02

Side 2
No.	Title	Writer(s)	Length
6.	"Crime of Passion"		3:30
7.	"The Poet and the One Man Band"	T. Scherpenzeel	4:10
8.	"Ruthless Queen"		4:47
9.	"No Man's Land"	T. Scherpenzeel	4:00
10.	"First Signs of Spring"	T. Scherpenzeel	3:39

== Band members ==
- Edward Reekers – lead vocals
- Johan Slager – guitars
- Ton Scherpenzeel – keyboards
- Peter Scherpenzeel – bass guitar
- Max Werner – drums, percussion, backing vocals
- Katherine Lapthorn – backing vocals
- Irene Linders – backing vocals

== Charts ==
=== Weekly charts ===
Chart (1979)	Peak position
Dutch Albums (Album Top 100)	1

=== Year-end charts ===
Chart (1979)	Position
Dutch Albums (Album Top 100)	6
