= Syb van der Ploeg =

Dutch singer and songwriter

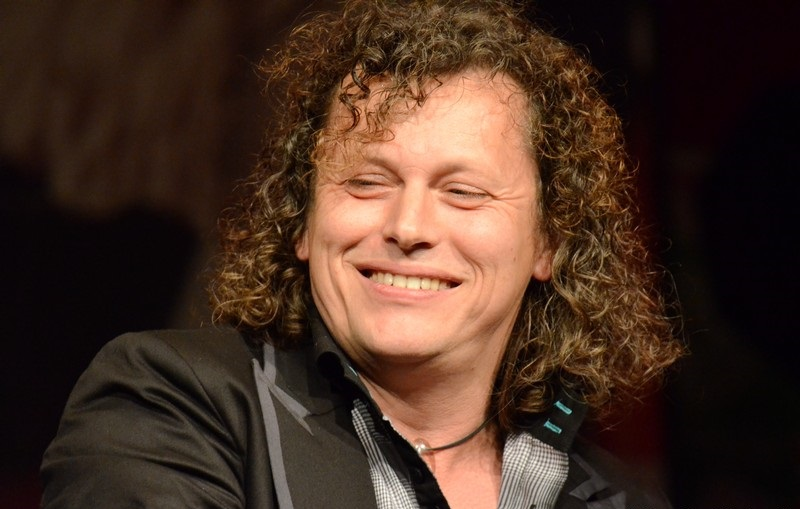
- Syb van der Ploeg (2011)
- Born: 15 June 1966 (age 58); Dokkum, Netherlands

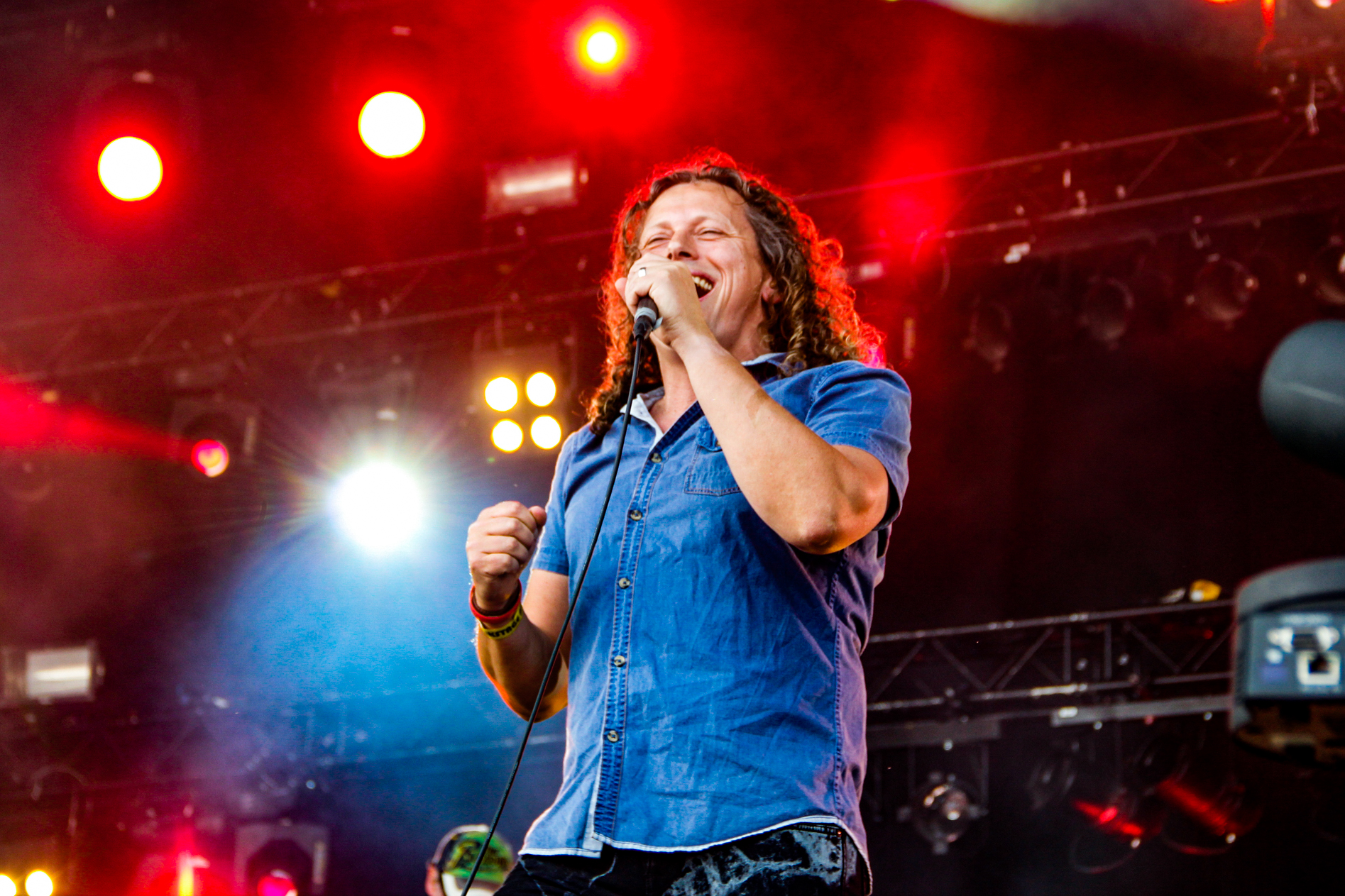
Syb van der Ploeg (2014).

Syb van der Ploeg (born 15 June 1966) is a Dutch singer and songwriter.

== Career ==
He was the lead vocalist for the song "Ruthless Queen" released in the 2000 album Close to the Fire by the Dutch progressive rock band Kayak. In 2000, he also played the role of JP in the film De Fûke.

He participated in the 2010 edition of the television show De beste zangers van Nederland.

In 2011, he also played the role of Jesus in the first edition of The Passion.

In 2017, he played a role in that year's Sinterklaasjournaal.
