= Eyewitness (Kayak album) =

Live album (in studio) by Kayak
- Released: 1981, 1994 (reissue)
- Recorded: 1981, at Wisseloord Studios, Hilversum, The Netherlands
- Genre: Progressive rock
- Label: Pseudonym (1994 reissue)
- Producer: Kayak

Kayak chronology
Merlin (1981)	Eyewitness (1981)	Close to the Fire (2000)

Eyewitness is an album by the Dutch progressive rock band Kayak. The original LP was released in 1981. The album was recorded 'live' (but without audience) in a recording studio, with some overdubs added later. To create a 'live' atmosphere, Kayak fans were invited later to cheer and clap to the already recorded songs. The CD release was transferred from the original tapes, so it doesn't have the audience participation. The album has three new songs: "Eyewitness", "Who's Fooling Who" and "Only You And I Know".

The line-up of the band didn't feature background singers Irene Linders and Katherine Lapthorne anymore. After this album, the band broke up, only to reincarnate in 1999. It was rated four stars by AllMusic.

== Track listing ==
1. "Eyewitness" (T. Scherpenzeel/I. Linders) - 3:21
2. "Periscope Life" (T. Scherpenzeel) - 4:09
3. "Ruthless Queen" (T. Scherpenzeel/I. Linders) - 5:05
4. "Want You To Be Mine" (T. Scherpenzeel) - 4:48
5. "Lyrics" (T. Scherpenzeel) - 1:59
6. "Chance For A Lifetime" (T. Scherpenzeel) - 4:22
7. "Who's Fooling Who" (T. Scherpenzeel/I. Linders) - 3:44
8. "Irene" (T. Scherpenzeel) - 3:12
9. "Only You And I Know" (T. Scherpenzeel/I. Linders) - 3:12
10. "Winning Ways" (T. Scherpenzeel/I. Linders) - 3:28
11. "Starlight Dancer" (T. Scherpenzeel) - 4:58
12. "No Man's Land" (T. Scherpenzeel) - 5:22

=== Bonus tracks (1994 reissue) ===
1. "The Car Enchanter (Sikkens Song)" (T. Scherpenzeel/I. Linders) - 2:36
2. "Ivory Dance '94" (T. Scherpenzeel) - 2:51

== Lineup ==
- Edward Reekers - lead vocals (all but 5, 12)
- Johan Slager - guitars, backing vocals
- Ton Scherpenzeel - keyboards, backing vocals
- Peter Scherpenzeel - bass guitar
- Max Werner - drums, harmony vocals, lead vocals (5, 12), co-lead vocals (7, 11)
