= De Fûke =

2000 film

- Distributed by: Independent Films
- Release date: 2000
- Running time: 90 minutes
- Country: Netherlands
- Language: West Frisian

De Fûke is a 2000 Frisian film directed by Steven de Jong. The film is based on the 1966 book, written by Rink van der Velde.

== Cast ==
- Rense Westra - Jelle
- Syb van der Ploeg - JP
- Steven de Jong – Germ
- Peter Tuinman - Detective
- Hidde Maas -Mayor
- Hilbert Dykstra - adjudant
- Joop Wittermans – Salesman
- Cynthia Abma – Mirjam
- Jan Arendsz – de maat
