= Max Werner =

Dutch musician (1953–2024)

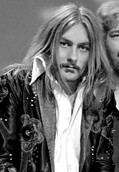

Background information
- Born: 29 December 1953; Hilversum, Netherlands
- Died: 9 April 2024 (aged 70)
- Genres: Rock
- Instruments: Vocals, drums
- Formerly of: Kayak

Max Werner (29 December 1953 – 9 April 2024) was a Dutch vocalist, musician, and drummer. He was the lead singer, drummer, and percussionist of the progressive art rock band Kayak.

== Life and career ==
Werner was born in Hilversum. In 1972, Werner co-founded the band along with keyboardist Ton Scherpenzeel, guitarist Johan Slager, and drummer Pim Koopman. He sang lead vocals (and played mellotron) on Kayak's first five albums. He later switched to drums until the band split up in 1982. In 1999, he returned as singer for the Kayak album Close to the Fire. After a short tour in 2000, he had to leave again due to health problems.

Werner also recorded four solo albums. In May 1981, he scored a hit single with "Rain in May", which peaked at No. 6 in the Netherlands and was a huge success in certain other European countries as well. In June of that same year, the song also peaked as high as No. 74 on the American Billboard Hot 100 charts. In September 1981, the song peaked at No. 2 in Germany. In April 2005, Werner performed the song on the German TV show Die Hit-Giganten – die 30 größten Hits und Interpreten der coolen Achtziger.

Werner died on 9 April 2024, at the age of 70.

== Discography ==
=== Studio albums with Kayak ===
(as lead singer):

- See See the Sun (1973)
- Kayak II (1974)
- Royal Bed Bouncer (1975)
- The Last Encore (1976)
- Starlight Dancer (1977)
- Close to the Fire (2000)

(as drummer):

- Phantom of the Night (1979)
- Periscope Life (1980)
- Merlin (1981)
- Eyewitness (1981) ("Live" studio album)

=== Solo albums ===
- Rainbow's End (1979)
- Seasons (1981)
- How Can It Be... Like This? (1988)
- Not the Opera (1995)

=== Singles ===
- "Rain in May" (1981)
- "Summer in the City" (1981)
- "Stop and Start" (1982)
- "Roadrunner" (1983)
- "Throw the Dice" (1984)
- "Dim the Light" (1985)
- "And the Rain" (1986)
- "Fortissimo" (1995)
