= Rain in May =

1981 song by Max Werner

Single by Max Werner

from the album Seasons
- B-side: "In the Winter"
- Released: April 1981
- Length: 3:38
- Label: CBS
- Songwriter(s): Chris Meldon, Chris Pilgram, Max Werner
- Producer(s): Chris Meldon, Chris Pilgram, Max Werner

"Rain in May" is a song by Dutch musician Max Werner from his first solo album, Seasons (1981). Written and produced by Werner, Chris Meldon and Chris Pilgram, it was released as the album's single in April 1981.

== Composition and lyrics ==
"Rain in May" is written in common time. The track has a tempo of 98 beats per minute and is played in the key of G major. In the lyrics, the male narrator describes his depressive mood during the three seasons: autumn (first stanza), winter (second stanza) and summer in the last stanza. The only time of year he feels comfortable is spring, especially during the month of May. Various unpleasant phenomena that occur in every season are discussed, such as cold and slippery roads in winter. At the end of each verse and in the chorus, he expresses his euphoria in relation to the eponymous "Rain in May".

== Commercial performance ==
"Rain in May" peaked at No. 3 on the Netherlands' Dutch Top 40 chart in June 1981 and was also a chart success in certain other European countries as well. In May 1981, the song peaked at No. 74 on the US Billboard Hot 100 chart. In September of the same year, the song reached No. 2 in West Germany.

== Live performances ==
On 17 August 1981, Max Werner performed the song first time on the music programme Disco in West Germany, broadcast by ZDF. In April 2005, Werner performed the song on the German TV show Die Hit-Giganten – die 30 größten Hits und Interpreten der coolen Achtziger.

== Track listing ==
7-inch single

1. "Rain in May" – 3:37
2. "In the Winter" – 4:57

== Charts ==
=== Weekly charts ===
| Chart (1981) | Peak position |
|---|---|
| Belgium (Ultratop 50 Flanders) | 10 |
| Netherlands (Dutch Top 40) | 3 |
| Netherlands (Single Top 100) | 6 |
| Switzerland (Schweizer Hitparade) | 10 |
| US Billboard Hot 100 | 74 |
| West Germany (GfK) | 2 |

=== Year-end charts ===
| Chart (1981) | Position |
|---|---|
| West Germany (Official German Charts) | 49 |

== Cover versions ==
In 1981, German comedian Dieter Hallervorden covered the song as "Wo ist mein Toupet?".
