= Watts in a Tank =

Studio album by Diesel
- Released: 1980 (Netherlands); 1981 (US)
- Recorded: 1979
- Studio: DMC Studio (Baarn)
- Genre: Rock
- Length: 35:47
- Language: English
- Label: Regency
- Producer: Pim Koopman

Diesel chronology
Watts in a Tank (1980)	Unleaded (1982)

Professional ratings
Review scores
Source	Rating
AllMusic	4.5/5 stars

Watts in a Tank is the first album released by the Dutch musical group Diesel. It was first released in the Netherlands in 1980 by Polydor, and was released in the United States by Regency in 1981. The album was reissued on compact disc by One Way in 2002.

The album, in-between rock and power pop, contained several polished soft metal ballads and was compared by some to Tom Petty's work, while the biggest hit from the album, "Sausalito Summernight" (which reached No. 1 in Canada and peaked on the Billboard Hot 100 at No. 25) has been compared to (and frequently misattributed to) the Steve Miller Band. The album reached No. 68 on the US Billboard chart in 1981 but was not a commercial success. Four of the tracks from this album (the aforementioned "Sausalito Summernight", "Goin' Back to China" (US No. 105), "Alibi", and "Down in the Silvermine") were released as singles. Worldwide sales of 350,000 units were reported for Watts in a Tank in December 1981.

The album charted at #68 in the U.S. and #19 for four weeks in Canada. It reached #38 in the Netherlands. The Canadian 1981 Year-end chart placed the album at #62.

Record World said the single "Goin' Back to China" features "a big, bouncy beat, cute lyrics and ringing guitars."

== Track listing ==
1. "Sausalito Summernight" – 5:08
2. "Goin' Back to China" – 3:04
3. "Alibi" – 2:48
4. "My Kind of Woman" – 3:21
5. "All Because of You" – 3:46
6. "Down in the Silvermine" – 3:01
7. "Good Mornin', Day" – 3:48
8. "Ready for Love" – 2:33
9. "The Harness" – 2:49
10. "Remember the Romans" – 2:51
11. "Bite Back" – 2:38

== Personnel ==
=== The Band ===
- Rob Vunderink – guitars, lead vocals
- Mark Boon – guitars, lead vocals
- Frank Papendrecht – bass guitars, backing vocals
- Pim Koopman – drums, keyboards, backing vocals

=== Additional contributors ===
- Moog synthesizer programming: Johan Timman
