= Wijnand Ott =

Dutch musician

Wijnand Ott (born 12 October 1955) is a Dutch musician.

In 1980, Ott joined Diesel as a replacement for Frank Papendrecht. He had taken up a career as a bassist only recently before that (switching from guitar) and despite his shy demeanour, he was a quality bassist.

In 1984 he left the band just before its demise around a year later.

Today Ott works in television.
