= Kayak (band) =

Dutch rock band

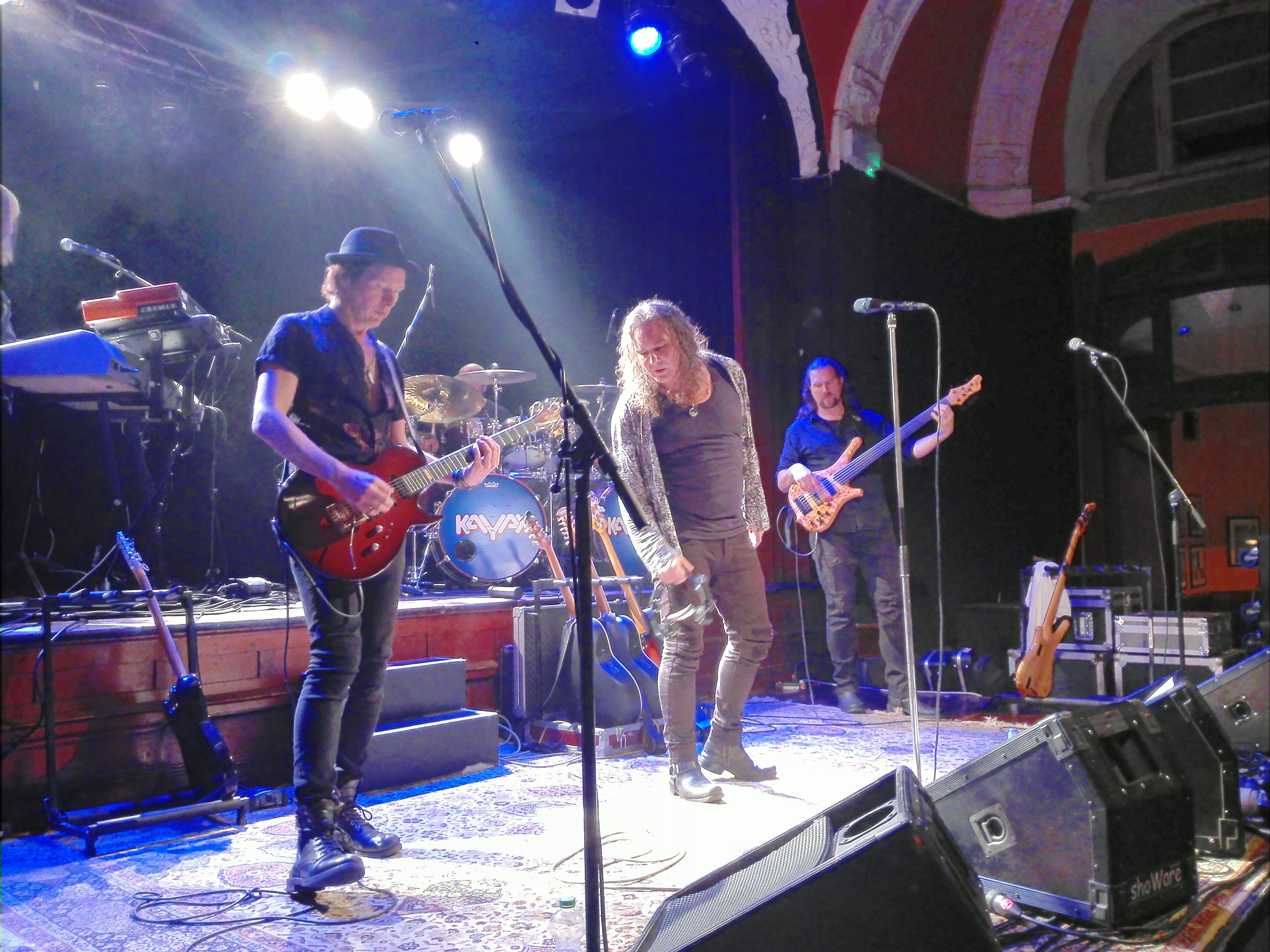
- Kayak performing in 2018

Background information
- Origin: Netherlands
- Genres: Progressive rock, art rock
- Years active: 1972–1982, 1999–2025
- Labels: Harvest, Smh
- Members: Ton Scherpenzeel; Marcel Singor; Bart Schwertmann; Kristoffer Gildenlöw; Hans Eijkenaar
- Past members: Max Werner; Johan Slager; Pim Koopman; Cees van Leeuwen; Bert Veldkamp; Theo de Jong; Charles Schouten; Peter Scherpenzeel; Irene Linders; Katherine Lapthorn; Rob Winter; Bert Heerink; Monique van der Ster; Edward Reekers; Cindy Oudshoorn; Rob Vunderink; Joost Vergoossen; Jan van Olffen; Collin Leijenaar
- Website: kayakonline.info

Kayak was a Dutch rock band formed by Ton Scherpenzeel and Pim Koopman in Hilversum in 1972. In 1973, their debut album See See the Sun was released, including three hit singles. Their popularity was mainly in the Netherlands, with their top hit "Ruthless Queen" reaching No. 6 on the Dutch charts in March 1979. They disbanded in 1982 after releasing nine albums.

In 1999, the band was asked to perform on the TV show De Vrienden van Amstel Live. After this performance, they decided to reform, and released nine further studio albums and three live albums.

== History ==
=== Initial run ===
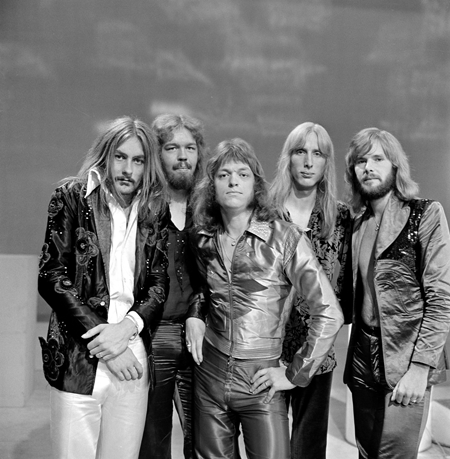
Left to right: Max Werner, Pim Koopman, Johan Slager, Ton Scherpenzeel and Bert Veldkamp (1974)

Co-founder Ton Scherpenzeel is the only member who has played on every Kayak album. Apart from keyboards, he also plays accordion, occasional bass guitar (for instance on the entire Nostradamus album) and double bass. He also provides backing vocals and sings lead vocals on the song "Love's Aglow" on the original Merlin album.

Singer/drummer Max Werner provided lead vocals on the first five albums. He switched to drums and percussion in 1978, a position he held for the following four albums. In 1999, he returned as lead singer for the Close to the Fire album. After that album, he did a short tour with Kayak, but left the band in 2000. Werner has released four solo albums and he had a hit in Europe in 1981 with the single "Rain in May".

Johan Slager played guitar on every album until the split in 1982. He joined the band for the occasional live performances in the 1990s, but was not involved in the reunion of 1999. He was replaced by Rob Winter, who played on two albums before Joost Vergoossen became the next lead guitarist.

Drummer Pim Koopman was also a founding member. After "The Last Encore" in 1976, he decided to leave the band; he was offered a job as a full-time producer, working with Dutch artists Maywood, Valensia, Robby Valentine, and Petra Berger. He came back as drummer in 1999 and did not leave the drum stool until his death on 23 November 2009, aged 56. Apart from drums, Koopman played occasional keyboards and guitar, as well as providing lead and backing vocals. After leaving the band in 1976, he was replaced by Charles Schouten, who was subsequently replaced by vocalist Max Werner in 1978 until the band's breakup in 1982. Following his death, he was replaced by Hans Eijkenaar.

Original bass player Cees van Leeuwen left in 1975 to concentrate on his studies. He became a lawyer, and in 2002, he became the Dutch State Secretary of Culture and Media in the short lived Balkenende 1 cabinet. He was replaced by Bert Veldkamp, who played bass from 1975 to 1976 and returned for the 1999 reunion. After the 2003 album Merlin – Bard of the Unseen, Veldkamp left Kayak because he could not combine his work in a band with his own career.

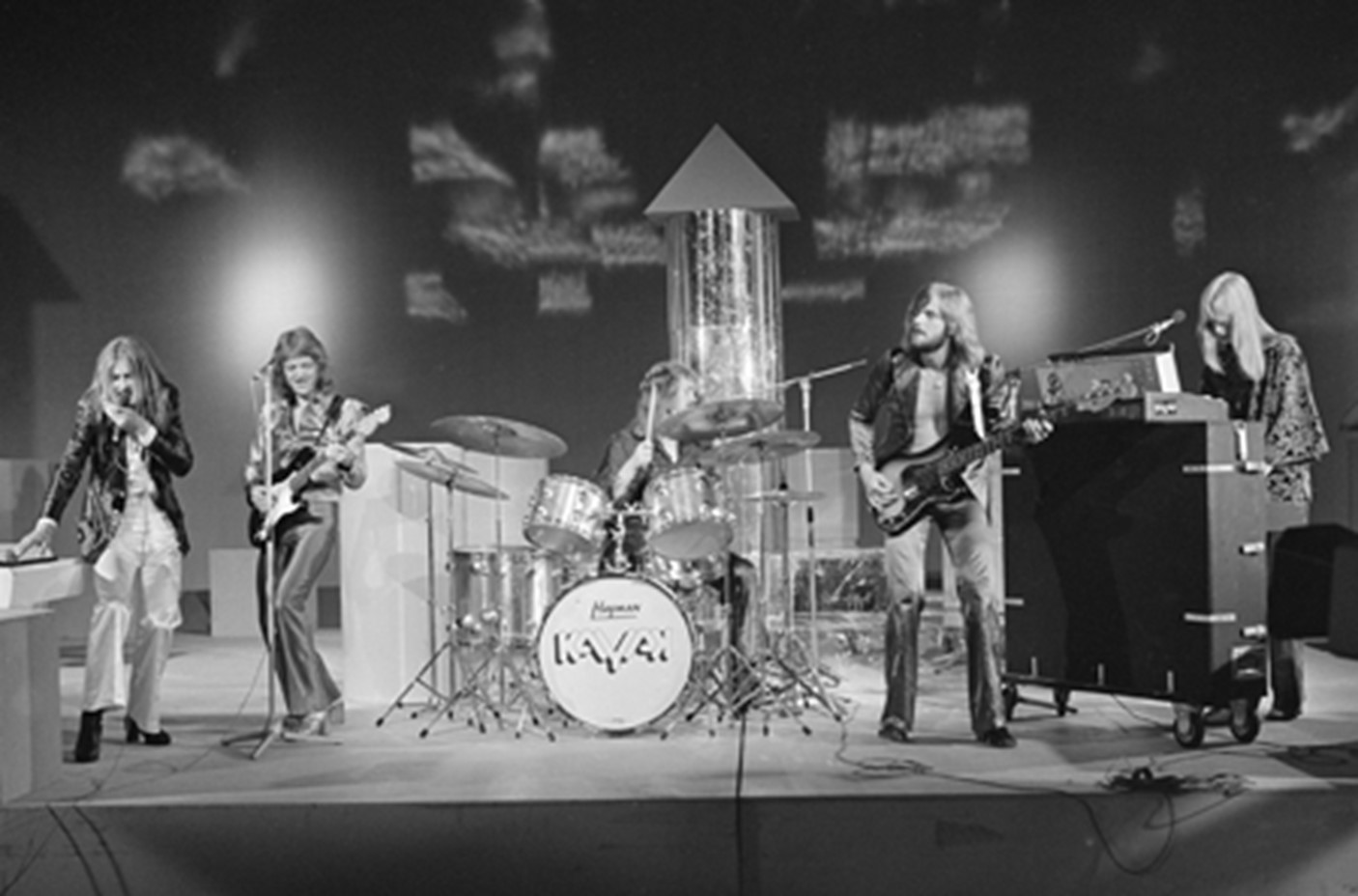
Kayak in 1974

Peter Scherpenzeel, Ton's younger brother, was Kayak's roadie in the early days. In 1978, he joined as the band's bass player, when Theo de Jong left after just one album. Peter played bass on Kayak's best-selling album Phantom of the Night, as well as on the two following albums.

Long-time Kayak fan Edward Reekers became lead singer in 1978, when Max Werner changed to drums. The first song he recorded was "Ruthless Queen", which became Kayak's biggest hit. He remained lead singer until 1982. After that, he did two solo albums and worked as a backing vocalist, doing commercials, and lending his voice to cartoon films and children's TV shows. When singer Bert Heerink had other commitments in 2003, Reekers replaced him at some Merlin concerts. It was the beginning of his comeback, followed by the "Nostradamus" album in 2005 on which Edward plays the part of the monk. After that album, Heerink left the band and Reekers was Kayak's only male lead singer again.

From 1978 until 1981, Kayak was augmented by two female background singers; Katherine Lapthorn, wife of bassist Peter Scherpenzeel, sang on three studio albums. After the split in 1982, she left the music business. Ton Scherpenzeel's wife Irene Linders not only sang backing vocals, but also developed into the band's main lyricist. When Kayak reunited in 1999, she became the band's manager.

=== Since the 1999 reunion ===
Bert Heerink (ex Vandenberg) was asked to help the band out on tour in 2000. The plan was that on stage he would do the songs that Edward Reekers did originally, leaving more room for Max Werner to do his own Kayak songs and play percussion. But when Werner left, he was not replaced, so Heerink became lead singer. He did three studio albums and one live album before concentrating on his solo career.

Rob Vunderink joined in 2001 as extra guitarist and vocalist. Vunderink is an experienced musician who played in many Dutch bands since the 1960s. He collaborated with Pim Koopman in the Diesel band, which reached No. 25 on the American Billboard Hot 100 charts with the single "Sausalito Summernight".

In 2003, female singer Cindy Oudshoorn joined Kayak for the Merlin album and tour, and she decided to stay.

In 2005, Jan van Olffen joined Kayak as their bass player. He had previously worked with Sister Sledge amongst others, and played in the house band for many Dutch stage musicals. Monique van der Ster also joined the band briefly in 2005 as a vocalist.

On 4 January 2008, the band released Coming Up for Air. That same day saw the start of their 35th anniversary tour. On 7 October 2008, they ended the tour at the Paradiso in Amsterdam. The concert was released on CD and DVD as The Anniversary Box in December 2008.

In October 2009, the band embarked on a Dutch tour. According to Ton Scherpenzeel (on the band's website), after that tour, Kayak would no longer do the album-tour-album-tour cycle. They would probably keep on making new music though, as Scherpenzeel stated. But the sudden and unexpected death of Pim Koopman in November 2009 (halfway through the tour) made the future of the band uncertain.

In May 2010, the band's website announced a tribute concert for Pim Koopman. The concert was held on 22 November at the Paradiso. It involved not only Kayak, but also some artists with whom Koopman had worked in the past. Some of the names that appeared on stage: Pussycat, Karen Maywood, Alides Hidding, José Hoebee and Michael Robinson. Okkie Huysdens (with whom Koopman formed The President) and Jeroen Engelbert (one of many members of Koopman's band Diesel) also performed. For the occasion, Kayak used Hans Voerman as an extra keyboard player. The drum stool was occupied by Hans Eijkenaar. After the concert, Kayak announced that Eijkenaar was the new drummer of Kayak. With Eijkenaar on drums, Kayak released their album Anywhere But Here in September 2011.

After the Pim Koopman Tribute in 2010, drummer Hans Eijkenaar was asked to become a full member. Besides playing drums, he was also responsible for the mixing of the Kayak albums Anywhere But Here and Cleopatra – The Crown of Isis. Eijkenaar was not always available for Kayak concerts; Sjoerd Rutten was the drummer when he was unable to perform.

On 21 September 2012, it was exactly 40 years ago that the band's name was chosen. To celebrate this, Kayak went on a tour titled Journey Through Time after one of their songs. They played at least one song from each studio album. Also included was an excerpt from their forthcoming album Cleopatra – The Crown of Isis. That excerpt was also released on an EP, backed by a newly recorded version of Symmetry, a song that Scherpenzeel and Koopman originally wrote in 1971. The album Cleopatra – The Crown of Isis was released in November 2014.

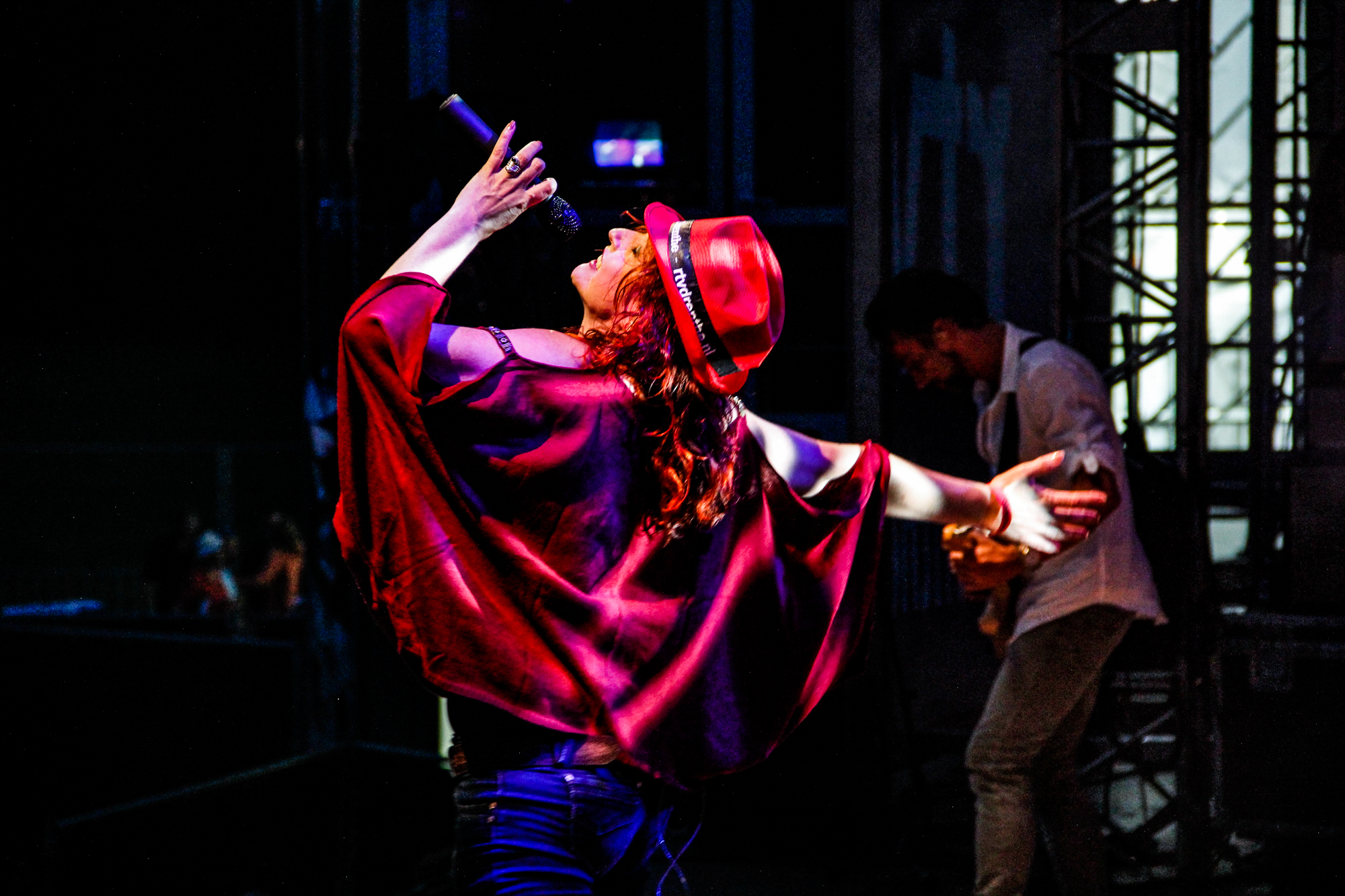
Cindy Oudshoorn in 2014

In October 2014, both Edward Reekers and Cindy Oudshoorn announced that they would not take part in the live performances of the Cleopatra album in 2015. At the end of 2014, both announced their departure from Kayak, leaving the band without lead vocalists. At a one-off live performance of Cleopatra in March 2015 on the Dutch isle of Texel, Oudshoorn was replaced by Marjolein Teepen, who had worked with Kayak before. Male vocalists were Martin van der Starre, Alexander van Breemen—both of whom also sang on the album—and Rolf Koster.

In the summer of 2017, Kayak announced: "The band that will go on tour features keyboardist Ton Scherpenzeel, guitarist Marcel Singor and vocalist Bart Schwertmann, as well as bass player Kristoffer Gildenlöw (who can be heard on the new album 'Seventeen') and- recently added to the band- drummer Collin Leijenaar." However, during their European tour of 2018, Kayak and Leijenaar decided to discontinue their collaboration. Hans Eijkenaar returned for the remaining part of the tour. In November 2021, Kayak announced that their next tour - scheduled for April/May 2022 - would be their last.

In 2025, recordings of their farewell concerts in Holland were released on CD and DVD, under the title "Back To Shore". A release party was held in De Meern (The Netherlands) on 2 March 2025. The party also served as a final goodbye from the band.

Seven months after the band's final show, on October 7, 2025, former vocalist Edward Reekers died from cancer. He was 68.

== Personnel ==
Final lineup

- Ton Scherpenzeel - keyboards, backing and occasional lead vocals, bass (1972-1982, 1999–2025)
- Hans Eijkenaar - drums (2009-2016, 2018–2025)
- Bart Schwertmann - vocals (2017–2025)
- Marcel Singor - guitars, vocals (2017–2025)
- Kristoffer Gildenlöw - bass (2017–2025)

Former members

- Max Werner - vocals, percussion (1972-1982, 1999-2000), drums (1978-1982)
- Johan Slager - guitars, backing vocals (1972-1982)
- Pim Koopman - drums, vocals (1972-1976, 1999–2009, his death)
- Cees van Leeuwen - bass (1972-1975)
- Bert Veldkamp - bass, backing vocals (1975-1976, 1999-2005)
- Theo de Jong - bass (1976-1978)
- Edward Reekers - vocals (1978-1982, 2003, 2005-2014)
- Charles Schouten - drums (1976-1978)
- Peter Scherpenzeel - bass (1978-1982)
- Irene Linders - backing vocals, lyrics (1978-1981)
- Katherine Lapthorn - backing vocals (1978-1981)
- Rob Winter - guitars (1999-2003)
- Bert Heerink - vocals (2000-2005)
- Cindy Oudshoorn - vocals (2003-2014)
- Monique van der Ster - vocals (2005)
- Rob Vunderink - guitars, vocals (2001-2016)
- Joost Vergoossen - guitars (2003-2016)
- Jan van Olffen - bass (2005-2016)
- Collin Leijenaar - drums (2017)

Timeline

== Discography ==
=== Studio albums ===
- See See the Sun (1973)
- Kayak (1974)
- Royal Bed Bouncer (1975)
- The Last Encore (1976)
- Starlight Dancer (1977)
- Phantom of the Night (1978) (reissued on vinyl by Renaissance Records in 2020)
- Periscope Life (1980)
- Merlin (1981)
- Eyewitness (1981) (recorded live in studio; audience sound dubbed on original LP but removed on later CD issues)
- Close to the Fire (2000)
- Night Vision (2001)
- Merlin – Bard of the Unseen (2003)
- Nostradamus – The Fate of Man (2005) (double CD) / Excerpts from Nostradamus – The Fate of Man (2005) (single CD)
- Coming Up for Air (2008)
- Letters from Utopia (2009) (double CD)
- Anywhere but Here (2011)
- Cleopatra – The Crown of Isis (2014) (double CD)
- Seventeen (2018)
- Out of This World (2021)

=== Compilations ===
- "Ruthless Queen"/ "Keep the Change" (singles) (limited edition vinyl) (2020)

=== Live albums ===
- Chance for a Livetime (2001) (double CD)
- Kayakoustic (2007)
- The Anniversary Concert (2008) (double CD + 'Highlights' DVD)
- Live 2019 (2020) (Double CD)
- Back To Shore - The 2022 Farewell Tour (2025) (double CD + DVD)

=== Box sets ===
- The Anniversary Box (2008) (4 CD + DVD)
- Journey Through Time (2017)

=== UK and North American singles ===
- "Wintertime" / "Serenades" (UK, 1974)
- "We Are Not Amused" / "Give It a Name" (UK, 1974)
- "I Want You To Be Mine" / "Irene" (NA, 1978) (#55 US / #63 CAN)
- "Keep the Change" / "Ivory Dance" (NA, 1979)
- "Periscope Life" / "Stop That Song" (US, 1980)
- "Seagull" / "The Sword In The Stone" (UK, 1981)
