= Jan Vayne =

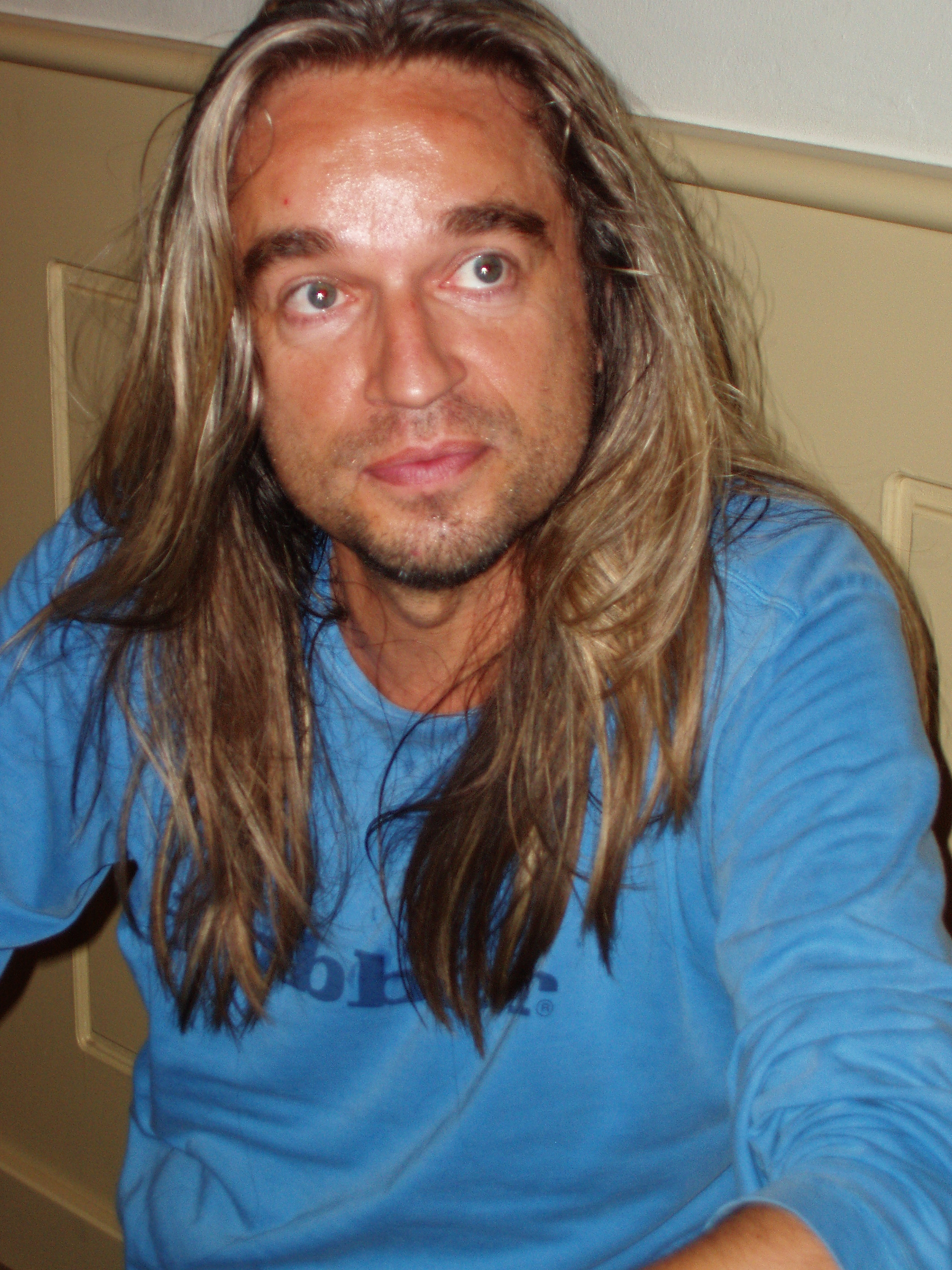

Background information
- Birth name: Jan Veenje
- Born: Zuidwolde, Drenthe 9 June 1966 (age 58)
- Origin: Netherlands
- Years active: 1976-present
- Website: Official website

Jan Vayne (pseudonym of Jan Veenje) (born June 9, 1966 in Zuidwolde, Drenthe) is a Dutch pianist. He began piano lessons at the age of 4 years and by the time he was 10, he had won his first prize. In 1984 Vayne began his study at the conservatorium in Zwolle and he graduated with a soloist diploma. He received much acclaim after several appearances on Dutch television talk shows.

He has made several CDs and has given many concerts. In 1997 he was invited to perform a concert in the Folger Shakespeare Library in Washington DC to honour President William Clinton's second-term inauguration.

Vayne has in the past worked with DJ and producer Armin van Buuren. Together they made the album Classical Trancelations that is a mixture of trance and classical music.

Jan Vayne regularly gives concerts in collaboration with symphony orchestras, ensembles, musicians, vocalists, harmony orchestras and choirs. In more recent times, Vayne performs together with organist/composer Martin Mans and singer Petra Berger.

Vayne was married with Joyce Wegman and they have a daughter, Olivia born in 2006.

== Trivia ==
- Vayne is a vegetarian and was a candidate for the sexiest vegetarian in the country.
- He is a big car enthusiast. Especially classic American cars with high horse power, six-liter engines and with eight cylinders.
- He owns a former Messonite church, the Sint Annakapel (Saint Anna Chapel) built in 1470 and situated on the Broederweg in Kampen. It functions as a romantic marriage location.
- Vayne's trademark is his long hair. This was once the subject of a rather successful television advertisement for a shampoo and smoked sausage product.

== Albums ==
Album	Tracks A	Tracks B
Reflections: 1989; using the name Jan Veenje; CD, Album; Eurosound – ES 46 967 CD; Netherlands; Producer – Inarco Zoetermeer, Jan Veenje; Eurosound – ES 46 967 CD	1 Theme By Mozart 3:19; 2 Romance I 6:22; 3 If I Had Words 5:24; 4 Introduction And Fantasy 3:45; 5 O Haupt Voll Blut Und Wunden 2:12	6 Yesterday 7:05; 7 Yamaha Cantate 3:00; 8 Do You Know? 6:06; 9 Romance II 6:32; 10 L'Amour C'Est Toi 3:26
Colours of my mind: 1991; Colours Of My Mind (CD, Album) EMI 7978872 Netherlands; Colours Of My Mind / Dunhill Lights Presents (CD, Album) IPP BV BOSPCD 135 Netherlands	1 Theme From A Diary 2:43; 2 Pieces Of Dreams 4:53; 3 Still Falling For You 3:04; 4 Eternity 2:57; 5 Tender Moments 3:57; 6 Something Of Value 2:00; 7 Passions 4:32	8 Lyrics Of Music 5:14; 9 Fairytale 2:53; 10 Lost In Heaven 2:13; 11 Memory 3:28; 12 Country Living 3:14; 13 A Flood Of Light 2:25
Living colours: 1992; CD, Album; EMI – 0777 7 80359 2 3, EMI – CD 0777 7 80359 2 3; Netherlands; ©EMI Music Holland B.V.	1 Who Wants To Live Forever 2:14; 2 The Show Must Go On 3:24; 3 Your Absence 3:19; 4 Colorful People 4:40; 5 ...And Soft Rains Will Be Falling...4:14; 6 Natural Beauty Unaffected 3:40; 7 La Chanson Des Vieux Amants 4:04; 8 Going Nowhere 3:07	9 Old And Wise 5:19; 10 Frozen Feelings 3:53; 11 Unchained (A Struggle For Love) 4:58; 12 Alone 3:40; 13 The Long And Winding Road 4:37; 14 Eleanor Rigby 2:13; 15 Fears For Tears 3:31
Hang on to a dream: 1993; CD, Album; EMI – 7243 8 27479 2 5; Netherlands; ©EMI Music Holland B.V.	1 I Will Always Love You 4:51; 2 More Than Anything In This World (Hard To Say I'm Sorry) 4:05; 3 A Spell Of Silence 3:51; 4 You Are So Beautiful 2:06; 5 Mystified 4:20; 6 Alive 4:25; 7 You * 6:01; 8 The Prophet's Tale 2:31	9 Warhol 2:43; 10 Innerbeauty (Hello) 4:42; 11 November Rain 5:41; 12 After The Rain 3:40; 13 A Final Awakening (The Prophecy Fulfilled) 3:58; 14 A Hazy Shade Of Winter 3:31; 15 Hang On To A Dream
Vanity: Nov 1994; CD, Album; EMI – 7243 8311902 8; Netherlands; Phonographic ©EMI Music Holland B.V.	1 Ruby's Arms 6:00; 2 Where The Violets Grow 4:09; 3 Age Of Lonelyness[sic] 7:22; 4 Invitation To The Blues 4:53; 5 Live For Love 7:42	6 Faithful 4:54; 7 Martha 4:54; 8 Underneath The Sheltering Sky 3:03; 9 A Tear Garden 5:19
Classics and pop>: 1996; CD, Album; EMI – 7243 8 37850 2 5; Netherlands; ©EMI Music Holland B.V.; Conductor – Dick Bakker; The Academy Of St Martin In The Fields*, The London Philharmonic Orchestra, The London Symphony Orchestra	1 Chopin Impression 3:52; 2 All By Myself 6:54; 3 Brahms Impression 2:40; 4 Bohemian Rhapsody 2:51; 5 We are The champions 2:59; 6 Ravel Impression 3:45; 7 Private Investigations 5:46	8 Schindler's List 4:12; 9 Bach Impression 2:53; 10 Conquest Of Paradise 4:55; 11 Vivaldi Impression 2:44; 12 I Will Always Love You 4:14; 13 Mozart Impression 3:16; 14 Music 6:06
Secrets of silence: 1997; CD, Album; EMI – 8 235532; Netherlands; ©EMI Music Holland B.V.	1 Dreaming 6:12; 2 Serenity 3:05; 3 Early Dawning 4:59; 4 Melancholy 6:38; 5 Love Of Life 3:46; 6 Whisper Of Hope 4:57	7 In The Mist Of Time 4:09; 8 Secrets Of Silence 4:18; 9 Precious 2:45; 10 A Distant Voice 3:54; 11 Memories Of Venice 5:57
Paintings of the seasons: 1999; Paintings Of The Seasons (2xCD, Album) De Haske Records, De Haske Records DHR 20.037-3, DHR 20.043-3 Netherlands; Jan Vayne Steunt Handicap.nl (CD) Not On Label (Jan Vayne Self-released) JV-1004 Netherlands 2013	Lente: 1 Het Begin 2:05; 2 De Groei 10:41; Zomer: 3 De Bloei 6:11; 4 Harmonie 3:53; 5 Volgroeid 4:27; Herfst: 6 Onrust 4:55; 7 Overgang 3:50	8 Vallend Blad 7:24; Winter: 9Inkeer 2:51; 10 Schemer 4:06; 11 Licht 4:40; 12 Prelude In C-Mineur 5:12; 13 Pianoconcert KV 488 Deel 2 - Adagio 4:52; 14 Chopin Prelude In Des (Regenprelude) 5:25; 15 Beethoven Mondscheinsonate 4:24
Media plaza movements: 1999; CD, Album, Promo; Not On Label – GP 0001; Netherlands; Recorded At – Studio 'Oud-Bussem'; ©Gopher Publishers	1 Intro - Media Plaza; 2 Het Auditorium; 3 Roundcontrol; 4 De Arcade; 5 Internet Plaza; 6 De Shuttle	6 De Shuttle; 7 De Media Arena; 8 Het Sky Theater; 9 De Huiskamer Van De Toekomst; 10 De Skybar; 11 Het Medialab; 12 Outro - Leaving Media Plaza
Romantic popsongs: 1998; Not On Label – JV 1001; CD, Album; Netherlands	1 Your Song 3:52; 2 Who Wants To Live Forever 3:41; 3 Angie 4:18; 4 Dust In The Wind 4:14; 5 Everything I Do, I Do It For You 4:29; 6 Imagine 4:26; 7 Margherita 4:40	8 Old And Wise 4:57; 9 She's Always A Woman To Me 4:08; 10 You Needed Me 3:23; 11 Sorry Seems To Be A Hardest Word 4:33; 12 Tears In Heaven 5:02; 13 The Long And Winding Road 3:12; 14 Imagine (2) 3:44
The Christmas album: 1998; CD, Album; EMI – 7243 4 974992 4; Netherlands; ©EMI Music Holland B.V.; Conductor – Pieter Jan Leusink; Orchestra – Holland Baroque Orchestra*	1 Christmas Tiding 2:22; 2 Silent Night 3:00; 3 Improvisation On O Come, All Ye Faithful 2:28; 4 O Come, All Ye Faithful 1:49; 5 Improvisation On O Come, All Ye Faithful & Hoe Leit Dit Kindeke 1:26; 6 Hoe Leit Dit Kindeke 2:54; 7 Meditation 2:08; 8 God Rest You Merry, Gentlemen 2:01; 9 O Kindeke Klein 4:09; 10 Improvisation On O Kindeke Klein & Jingle Bells & Es Ist Ein Ros' Entsprungen 1:51; 11 Es Ist Ein Ros' Entsprungen 2:15; 12 Once In Royal David's City 1:48; 13 Improvisation On In Dulci Jubilo 2:29	14 Gloria In Excelsis Deo! 1:45; 15 Prelude 1:07; 16 Ik Kniel Aan Uwe Kribbe Neer (I) 1:20; 17 Interlude 0:20; 18 Ik Kniel Aan Uwe Kribbe Neer (II) 1:00; 19 The First Nowell 2:04; 20 Midden In De Winternacht 4:47; 21 Last Christmas 2:07; 22 Impromptu 1:05; 23 We Wish You A Merry Christmas 1:16; 24 Hark! The Herald Angels Sing 1:12; 25 Hallelujah From Handel's Messiah 2:33
Metamorphosis: 2000; CD, Album; Dino Music – DNCD 20704; Netherlands	1 Toccata & Fugue 3:52; 2 Summer Rain 5:30; 3 Celebrate Life 5:18; 4 Lacrimosa 4:07; 5 Enchanting Images 5:04; 6 Inseparable Embrace 4:52	7 Take Me Now 5:19; 8 Adagio 4:06; 9 Beethoven Rules 5:11; 10 Infinite Passion 6:10; Bonus Track: 11 Celebrate Life (Rap Version) 5:18
Classical Trancelations: 2004; Classical Trancelations (2xCD, Comp) STEP (Stichting Entertainmentretail Promotion) STEP 2004032 Netherlands; Classical Trancelations (4xLP) Armada (4) ARMA027 Netherlands	CD 1: Chill: 1 The Promise Of A New World (Mark Otten Mix) 8:29; 2 Miami Sunset (Markus Schulz Mix) 6:09; 3 Fruits & Passion (Armin van Buuren's Downtempo Mix) 5:45; 4 Paris (Envio's Chillout Mix) 5:30; 5 Canon Ball (Fred Baker Chill Mix) 3:30; 6 A Concert In The Clouds (Arksun Chill Mix) 1:45; 7 Laments Of The Lost (Alucard's Chilled Mix) 8:51; 8 Sweet Symphony (Junk Science Mix) 7:13; 9 10PM (Subsphere Chillout Mix) 6:04	CD 2: Trance: 10 Heaven's Air (Fred Baker vs. Terry Bones Mix) 7:26; 11 Pictures (Vincent de Moor Mix) 6:00; 12 Welcome To A New World (Fred Baker Mix) 6:57; 13 The Verge (Tim Hornsby Mix) 5:28; 14 The Purple Point (Bobina Mix) 6:38; 15 Divided (The Boiler Room Mix) 5:17; 16 Dear Lilly (Haak Mix) 5:50; 17 Air A Pull (C-Quence Mix) 7:15; 18 Prosperity In A New World (Signum Mix) 7:53; 19 Mea Culpa (Subsphere Mix) 8:03; 20 2nd Season (Mindsensation Remix) 7:31
Psalmen & Hymns: 2009; CD, Album; Psalms & Hymns; Not On Label – 55 9100; Netherlands; Phonographic ©Pulse Concerts B.V.; ©Pulse Concerts B.V	1 Who Is On The Lord's Side? 3:51; 2 All Things Bright And Beautiful 2:30; 3 Een Lied Over Een Zijn 3:22; 4 Improvisatie Over Hymns 6:22; 5 Be Still 3:22; 6 Praise To The Lord 3:37; 7 Dear Lord And Father Of Mankind 3:32; 8 O God, Whom I Delight To Praise 3:00	9 Samenzang Psalm 150:1 En 2 2:18; 10 One Clear Voice 3:58; 11 De Handtekening Van De Heer 3:22; 12 Improvisatie Over Psalmmelodieen 6:19; 13 For All The Saints 4:32; 14 All Things Work Together For Good 3:00; 15 Leven Als Bomen, Wie Gaf Ons Een Plaats Op Aarde 5:17; 16 Total Praise 3:21
Crystal: 2008; together with Petra Berger; CD, Album; Not On Label – PBJV08; Netherlands; Recorded At – Studio Arnold Mühren; Producer – Jeroen Englebert	1 Scarborough Fair; 2 Broken Vow; 3 Caruso; 4 Liefde Van Later; 5 Nella Fantasia; 6 L'Ultimo Abbraccio	7 Oblivion; 8 Papa Can You Hear Me?; 9 Un Jour, Un Enfant; 10 Time To Say Goodbye; 11 Zeg Me Wie Je Ziet
Goed Gemaakt!: CD, Album; Not On Label – JV 1006; Netherlands	1 If You Don't Know Me By Now; 2 A La Mere; 3 Mondscheinsonate; 4 Prélude Fugue Et Variation; 5 Sorry Seems To Be The Hardest Word; 6 Air	7 Liebestraum; 8 Lied Ohne Worte; 9 Everything I Do, I Do For You; 10 Siciliano; 11 Adagio; 12 Lied Ohne Worte 2
Jan Vayne – Speelt Psalmen: CD, Album; Not On Label – 1000-VZ; Netherlands	1 De Heer Is Mijn Herder (1) [Volgens Psalm 23 Gesang 14] 2:17; 2 God Heb Ik Lief [Psalm 116] 3:34; 3 Uit Diepten Van Ellenden [Psalm 130] 5:13; 4 Evenals Een Moede Hinde [Psalm 42] 4:19; 5 U Alleen U Loven Wij [Psalm 75] 3:41; 6 Zing Mijn Ziel Voor God Uw Here [Psalm 146] 4:58	7 Gij Dienaars Aan Den Heer Gewijd [Psalm 134] 3:56; 8 Komt Nu Met Zang En Roert De Snaren [Psalm 33] 4:44; 9 Steekt Nu Voor God De Loftrompet [Psalm 95] 4:05; 10 De Stilte Zingt U Toe O Here [Psalm 65] 7:03; 11 God Enkel Licht [Gezang 449] 3:56; 12 De Heer Is Mijn Herder (2) [Volgens Psalm 23 Gesang 14] 3:31
On the road: 2006; Rood Hit Blauw – RHBCS 9905; CD, Single; Netherlands	1 –Dario & Jan Vayne Jij Bent Mijn Leven 3:23	2 –Dario Dit Is Zo'N Dag 3:09
Twee klaviervirtuozen in concert: 22 februari 2007; Jan Vayne and Martin Mans; CD (album), 1 disk; Netherlands	1 The Phantom Of The Opera 3:28; 2 Finlandia 4:36; 3 Triomfmars Uit Aida 2:55; 4 Thema's van Bach 3:51; 5 Air 4:07; 6 Thema's van Bach	7 Badinerie 1:28; 8 Improvisatie Op Verzoek 1 11:46; 9 Once Upon A Time In The West 3:37; 10 Improvisatie Over Populaire Klassiekers 9:22; 11 The Last Of The Mohicans 3:21; 12 Improvisatie Op Verzoek 2 5:00; 13 Improvisatie Over Volksliedjes 8:21; 14 The Stars And Stripes 3:23
Twee Klaviervirtuozen in concert II: 2008	1 Music 5:12; 2 Thema's van Morricone 6:26; 3 Raiders Of The Lost Ark 2:19; 4 Nearer To Thee 3:52; 5 Toccata Suite Gottique 3:41; 6 Siciliano 2:10; 7 Second Waltz 2:53; 8 You Raise Me Up 4:31; 9 Improvisatie 'A Toi La Gloire' 5:22	10 Conquest Of Paradise 4:28; 11 Improvisatie 4:32; 12 Rhythm Of Life 3:38; 13 Radetzky Marsch 2:40; 14 Improvisatie 'In Holland Staat Een Huis' 4:48; 15 O When The Saints 2:29; 16 Abide With Me 3:52; 17 Petersburger Schlittenfahrt 2:52
Ik Denk Altijd Nog Aan Jou: 2002; Grad Damen togetherwith Jan Vayne – Ik Denk Altijd Nog Aan Jou; HJDM Music – HJDM4001115; CD, Single; Netherlands	1 Ik Denk Altijd Nog Aan Jou 3:39	2 Ik Denk Altijd Nog Aan Jou (Piano Versie) 4:06
Armin van Buuren Feat. Jan Vayne – Serenity (Sensation White Anthem 2005): 04 Jul 2005; Featuring – Jan Vayne; Armada (4) – ARMA033; CD, Single; Netherlands; Published By – Nimra Music; Published By – Cloud 9 Music Publishing; ©Armin Audio B.V.; Licensed To – Armada Music B.V.; ©Armada Music B.V.; Written-By, Producer – Armin van Buuren, Jan Vayne	1 Serenity (Radio Edit) 3:00	2 Serenity (Original Mix) 8:27
Jan Vayne & Martin Mans Facebook Concerten : Live In Concert: 2013; Wipe Productions – WPR9131029; CD; Netherlands	1 The Stars And Stripes Forever : Jan Vayne / Martin Mans; 2 Psalm 95: Komt, Laat Ons Samen Isrels HEER : Jan Vayne; 3 Yerushalaim : Martin Mans; 4 Yerushalaim : Jan Vayne; 5 Petersburger Schlittenfahrt : Jan Vayne / Martin Mans; 6 Psalm 116: God Heb Ik Lief : Jan Vayne; 7 U Zij De Glorie Martin Mans :	8 Psalm 65: De Lofzang Klimt Uit Sions Zalen : Jan Vayne; 9 Alle Menchen Werden Bruder : Jan Vayne; 10 Hongaarse Dans No. 5 : Jan Vayne / Martin Mans; 11 Psalm 42: Maar De HEER Zal Uitkomst Geven : Jan Vayne; 12 De Heer Is Mijn Herder : Jan Vayne; 13 Abide With Me : Jan Vayne / Martin Mans
Jan Vayne Speelt Liederen van Johannes De Heer: CD, Album; Netherlands; Label – JV 1003	1 Heer Ik Hoor Van Rijke Zegen 4:14; 2 Welke Vriend Is Onze Jezus 3:58; 3 Nader Tot U, O Heer 5:15; 4 Leer Mij Uw Weg O Heer 5:12; 5 Nader, Mijn God, Bij U 4:03; 6 Veilig In Jezus Armen 3:25	7 God Is Tegenwoordig! 4:28; 8 'K Heb Geloofd En Daarom Zing Ik 3:39; 9 Gouden Harpen Ruisen 3:49; 10 Op De Heuvels Daarginds 3:46; 11 'T Scheepsken Onder Jezus Hoede 8:03; 12 Mijn Herder Is De Here God 4:39
Jan Vayne – Plays The Organ: CD, Album; Netherlands	1 Music 5:56; 2 Kortjakje 9:20; 3 Scheepje In De Storm 16:02	4 Pierement 6:34; 5 Countdown 11:39
