= Petra Berger =

Dutch actor and singer (born 1965)

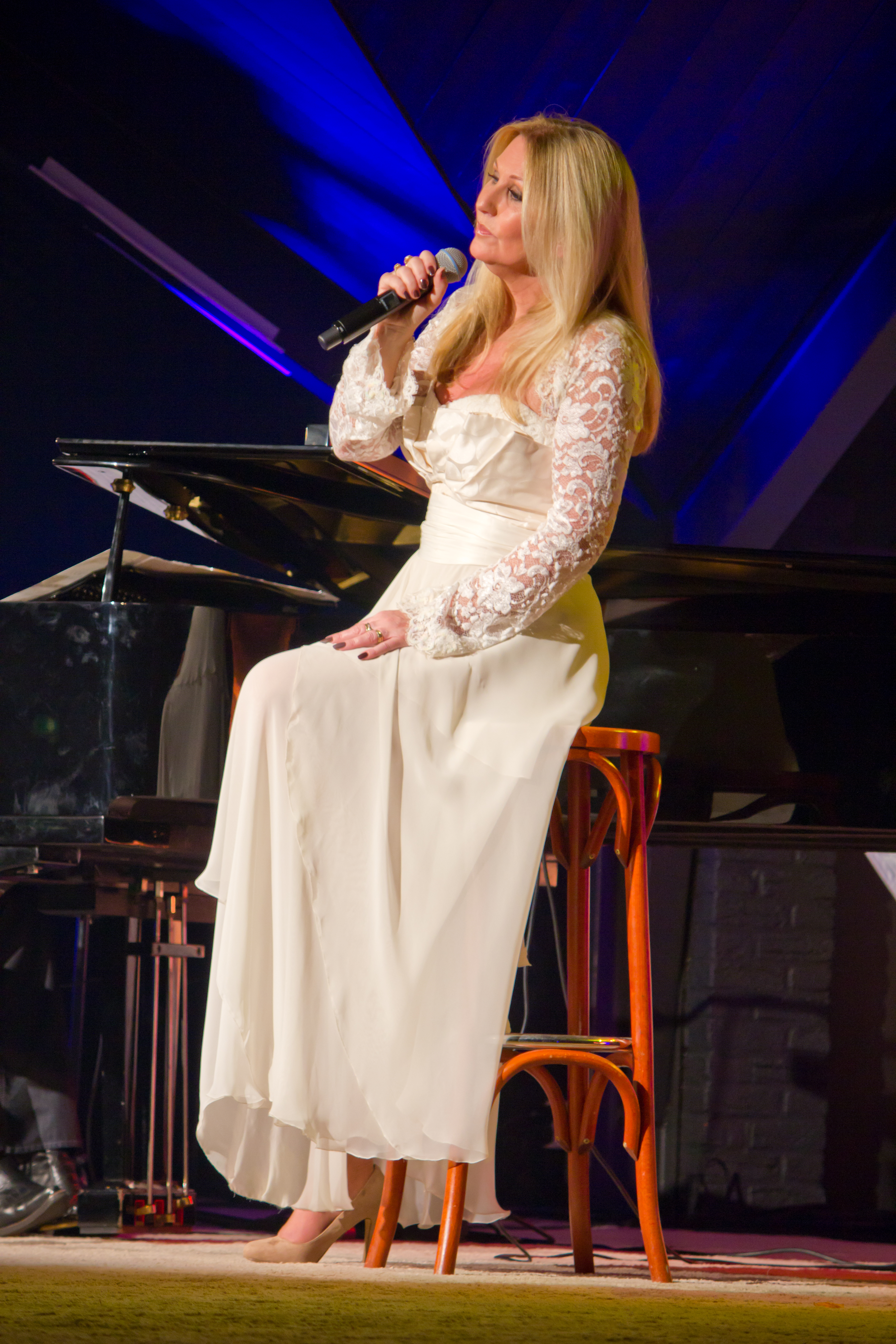
- Petra Berger in concert, 2012
- Born: Petronella Burger; October 23, 1965 (age 60); Amstelveen, Netherlands
- Occupations: Singer; Songwriter; Musical actress
- Website: petraberger.eu

Petra Berger, born Petronella Burger (Amstelveen, 23 October 1965), is a Dutch classical crossover singer, composer, and musical actress.

== Biography ==
Petra Berger was born into a musical family but did not pursue a musical career until later on in her life. Berger earned her secondary school diploma in 1982 and landed a job at a computer firm. During an annual party of the computer firm, Berger formed a band with some colleagues to play music just for fun. That evening, however, she realised that singing was what she really wanted to do.

=== Chess ===
In 1987, Petra Berger and her sister Lida decided to compete on the television program Soundmixshow presented by Henny Huisman, reaching the finals with the song "I Know Him So Well." After this show, the sisters were offered a recording deal and, under the name of Chess, soon had a modest hit with the song "Never Change a Winning Team," composed by Jeroen Englebert. They followed this song up with the singles "Make My Day" and "Promise Not to Tell." That being said, Chess' successes had a negative effect on her sister Lida, who liked to sing but was uncomfortable with the widespread attention and scrutiny that came with fame. For this reason, Lida quit Chess after several years. Lida was replaced by another singer, Denise van der Hek. In the early 1990s, Berger had a hit with Chess' cover of the song "I Dreamed a Dream" from the musical Les Misérables. As a response to the widespread success of the song, Chess released a whole album of tunes from popular movies and shows: The Oscar Album (1992). This album included a duet with René Froger. Shortly after the release of this album, Berger decided she wanted to pursue musicals and split up with Van der Hek, marking the end of her time as a member of Chess.

=== Musicals ===
Having ended her career as a member of Chess in 1992, Petra Berger shifted her focus to perfecting her musical theatre skills. She took singing classes with a variety of different teachers as well as piano, dance, and acting classes. Her first musical audition was for Les Misérables. Unfortunately, Berger was eliminated in the final round of auditions. Her second musical audition was for Cyrano de Bergerac: The Musical. She was offered a lead role but turned it down for unknown reasons. She subsequently auditioned for Phantom of the Opera but ultimately did not join the cast.

In late 1993, theatrical impresario Joop van den Ende Theatre Productions asked Berger to audition for the role of Johanna in the musical Sweeney Todd. She got the part, making Johanna her first lead role in a musical production. Later, Berger got the part of Belle in the musical Beauty and the Beast in Germany and the part of Maria in The Sound of Music in 1995 in Belgium.

In the following years, she gave birth to two children, Boris (1997) and Babette (1999), together with her husband Jeroen Englebert. Shortly afterwards, in 1999, Berger became a lead performer at a dinner show.

=== Eternal Woman ===
In 2000, Berger recorded some demos with producers Jeroen Englebert and Pim Koopman, one of which being the aria "O mio babbino caro" from Giacomo Puccini's opera Gianni Schicchi. Upon hearing this demo, the Universal Music Group offered Berger a record deal as a solo artist. In 2001, her first solo album Eternal Woman was released. This album, produced by Jeroen Englebert and Pim Koopman, contained a fusion of classical and pop musical themes. Each of the eleven songs on the album addresses the story and struggle of a legendary woman from world history:

- Marie José of Belgium in "Terra Promessa"
- Marie Antoinette in "Close Your Eyes (He'll Be Just Fine)" (based on Fauré's "Pavane")
- Boudicca in "Boadicea"
- Mata Hari in "The Girl Looking into Me" (based on Alexander Borodin's "Gliding Dance of the Maidens")
- Empress Elisabeth of Austria in "If I Had a Wish"
- Mary Magdalene in "When He Spoke My Name" (based on the Adagio movement from Mozart's Piano concerto No. 23)
- Juana la Loca in "Eres Todo para Mí"
- Joan of Arc in "I'm Coming Home"
- Catherine the Great in "Now's the Time"
- Mary, Queen of Scots in "Still a Queen (In My End Is My Beginning)" (based on Handel's Sarabande from Keyboard suite in D minor (HWV 437))
- Cleopatra in "All for Love"

Eternal Woman was successful in the Netherlands but also received international acclaim: The album became popular in countries like Taiwan, Israel, and Turkey. During the Night of the Proms concert series of the 2002 season, Petra Berger gained a significant deal of national acclaim and fame.

=== Mistress ===
In 2003, Berger's second studio album Mistress was released. Complementing the thematic tenet of Eternal Woman, Mistress was wholly dedicated to famous mistresses and deceived wives from the past and present. Mistress featured new compositions as well as adaptations of famous classical works. In 2004, the duet "Every Time" (with the American singer Joshua Payne) and the Italian version ("Cerco Te") were added to the album.

Having developed a full repertoire of her own, Berger went on to tour Dutch theaters in 2004 for the first time in her solo career. The tour performance revolved around her first two albums, Eternal Woman and Mistress. Berger personally developed the conceptual framework for the performance, while Bas Groenenberg was assigned as director and screenwriter. Jeroen Englebert and Pim Koopman were assigned as producers for the performance.

=== Live in Concert DVD ===
In 2004 Berger released a live recording of her Eternal Woman and Mistress theatre tour on DVD. Besides the live concert, this DVD also featured behind-the-scenes footage of the tour, several music videos, and two short documentaries on the albums Eternal Woman and Mistress.

After the release of the Live in Concert DVD, Berger went on a second theatre tour: Petra Berger Live.

=== Here and Now ===
In 2006, Berger launched her third album: Here and Now. Here and Now was produced by Tjeerd Oosterhuis and Jurre Haanstra and centers around Berger's personal emotions and thoughts; Berger left behind the past, a central theme in her previous albums, to focus the "here and now." The album was relaunched in 2007 with the bonus track "Life Goes On," a duet with the Italian tenor Alessandro Safina.

On the Here and Now tour, which began in late 2006, Berger sang pieces from her first albums and works from her recent project Here and Now.

In October 2006, Berger was asked to sing two duets with the Italian star Andrea Bocelli during a concert in the Scandinavium in Gothenburg, Sweden. They performed "Somos Novios (It's Impossible)" from Amore (originally a duet with Christina Aguilera) and "The Prayer" (originally by Céline Dion).

In early 2006, Berger began to collaborate with the Dutch virtuoso pianist Jan Vayne. They went on a collaborative tour named Van Bach tot ABBA in 2006, which brought the audience a diverse fusion of classical music with pop and musicals. Berger and Vayne began their joint tour Dichtbij! in October 2007.

=== Crystal ===
In 2008, Berger released an album in collaboration with Jan Vayne: Crystal. The album touches on a wide variety of musical genres, including pieces written by Ennio Morricone and John Ewbank, for example, but also has tracks originally performed by Herman van Veen and Simon & Garfunkel. All of the songs were recorded during a live studio session.

=== Touched by Streisand ===
Petra Berger has cited Barbra Streisand as an influence on her early musical ambitions. In this album, released in 2011, Berger sings songs that she has described as influential. On Touched by Streisand not only the most beautiful melodies of Barbra Streisand are heard, but the songs that have been personally important in her life and that fit this style of music perfectly.

=== De Hoogste Tijd ===
For the theater performance 'Quest for Happiness' pianist/composer Edwin Schimscheimer wrote the song 'De Hoogste tijd'. It was Petra's first single in Dutch to be released.

=== Passione ===
In 2019 was the release of the album Passione, sung entirely in Italian. The album includes pieces by composers Ennio Morricone, Tomaso Albinoni, and Gaetano Donizetti. The album was financed by crowdfunding and was produced by Joost van den Broek. Linked to this, the theater tour Passione Italiana started in 2019. Petra worked with the Italian singer Alessandro Neri. Together with him she released the duet single "Notte a Venezia".

"In perfetta Armonia" is a duet single Petra Berger recorded with her daughter, Babette Englebert.

== Discography ==
=== Albums ===
Eternal Woman (2001, platinum)

Mistress (2003, gold)

Here and Now (2006)

Crystal (2008)

Touched by Streisand (2011)

Passione (2019)

=== DVDs ===
- 2004: Live in Concert

== Television shows ==
1987: Soundmixshow

1996: Vrouwe Goeds in de film Hugo (voor de attractie Villa Volta in de Efteling)

2001: Eternal Woman Special

2001: TV show (TROS)

2001: Barend en van Dorp (RTL4)

2002: Night of the Proms

2002: Kopspijkers

2003: Tropisch Curaçao (TROS)

2003: Mistress Special

2004: Muziekfeest in de sneeuw

2004: Jubileumfeest in de ArenA (TROS)

2004: TV-special Mistress

2005: Notenclub

2006: Katja vs De Rest (Patty) (BNN)

2006: Muziekfeest voor dieren (TROS)

2006: Stop Aids Now (met Jan Vayne)

2006: 40 jaar BZN (TROS)

2007: Muziekfeest op het ijs (TROS)

2007: Kids Rights Gala (solo en met Alessandro Safina)

2007: Leader televisieprogramma Korenslag van Henny Huisman

2008: Bella Italia (TROS)

2008: Light of Live concert in Great Hall of the People in Beijing

2011: Muziekspecial Touched by Streisand (MAX)

2011: Koffie Max (October)

2011: Koffie Tijd RTL 4 (December)

2013: Beatrix Bedankt

2016: Tijd voor Max (June)

2018: Tijd voor Max (October)

2019: Tijd voor Max (March)

2019: Koffietijd (with Edwin Schimscheimer)

2020: Met Hart en Ziel (KRO-NCRV)

== Tours ==
2003: Eternal Women & Mistresses

2004: Petra Berger Live in Concert

2006: Van Bach tot ABBA met Jan Vayne

2006: Here and Now

2007/08: Dichtbij! met Jan Vayne

2009: Tango Dorado

2009/10/11/12: Kathedraalconcerten met Jan Vayne, Martin Mans en Formation

2011: Touched by Streisand

2012: 25-jarig Jubileumconcert

2013/14: Closer than ever” met Jan Vayne

2014: Eternal Songs

2014/2015: Diner voor twee i.s.m. Nationale vereniging De Zonnebloem

2015: You raise me up met Martin Mans en Voice

2015/2016: "Zoektocht naar geluk"

2017/2018: "Tribute to Barbra Streisand"

2019/2020: "Passione Italiana"
