= Royal Bed Bouncer =

Studio album by Kayak
- Released: 1975
- Recorded: 1975
- Studios: Intertone Studio, Heemstede, The Netherlands
- Genre: Progressive rock
- Labels: Janus (US), EMI/Harvest (Europe)
- Producers: Gerrit-Jan Leenders and Kayak

Kayak chronology
Kayak (1974)	Royal Bed Bouncer (1975)	The Last Encore (1976)

Royal Bed Bouncer is the third album by the Dutch progressive rock band Kayak, released in 1975. Nine of the ten songs were written by Ton Scherpenzeel, with Pim Koopman only contributing the instrumental "Patricia Anglaia". The album was produced by Gerrit-Jan Leenders and Kayak.

The original LP was released by EMI in the Netherlands (although copies on the Phonogram/Vertigo label also exist). In the USA, the LP was issued by Janus Records, with different sleeve design. The 1995 CD release was done by independent label Pseudonym.

"Chance For A Lifetime" was the only single release from this album, reaching No. 20 in the Dutch charts. In 1997, the line-up of this album reunited for a Dutch TV-special called "Classic Albums". This—along with a few live appearances—eventually lead to Kayak reforming in 1999.

== Track listing ==
1. Royal Bed Bouncer (4:02)
2. Life Of Gold (3:25)
3. You're So Bizarre (3:48)
4. Bury The World (4:21)
5. Chance For A Lifetime (4:15)
6. If This Is Your Welcome (4:56)
7. Moments Of Joy (4:00)
8. Patricia Anglaia (2:14)
9. Said No Word (5:15)
10. My Heart Never Changed (2:33)

All songs composed by Ton Scherpenzeel, except "Patricia Anglaia" (Pim Koopman)

Bonus tracks on 1995 CD release:

1. Alibi (3:40) (from Kayak's 2nd album)
2. Mountain Too Rough (3:57) (from Kayak's 2nd album)
3. Woe And Alas (3:00) (from Kayak's 2nd album)
4. Mouldy Wood (5:15) (from Kayak's 1st album)
5. Lovely Luna (8:19) (from Kayak's 1st album)
6. Forever Is A Lonely Thought (5:26) (from Kayak's 1st album)
7. Still Try To Write A Book (2:01) (single b-side from 1973)
8. Give It A Name (2:43) (single b-side from 1973)
9. Bulldozer (2:21) (demo, edited version)

== Members ==
Kayak

- Max Werner - lead (all but 4) and backing vocals, percussion, mellotron
- Johan Slager - guitars, backing vocals
- Ton Scherpenzeel - keyboards, backing vocals, double bass
- Bert Veldkamp - bass guitar, backing vocals
- Pim Koopman - drums, backing and lead (4) vocals

Additional Personnel

- Patricia Paay - wordless vocals (8)
