= Diesel (band) =

Dutch pop/rock group

- Origin: Netherlands
- Genres: Pop rock, progressive rock
- Years active: 1978–1985, 1988–1989, 2004–2007, 2016–present
- Members: Rob Vunderink; René Meister; Orlando Milan; Ron van Elswijk; Mark Boon
- Past members: Pim Koopman; Frank Papendrecht; Wijnand Ott; Hugo de Bruin; Kim Weemhoff; Bas Krumperman; Leen Barbier; André Versluijs; Ronald Oor; Jan Loomans; Henk Hager; Jeroen Englebert; Thomas Kroon; Otto Lenselink; Werner Cornand; Dave Bordeaux
- Website: Diesel

Diesel is a Dutch pop/rock group that became one of the relatively few Dutch acts to chart in the U.S. when their song "Sausalito Summernight" entered the U.S. Top 40 in 1981.

== Origin and history ==
Diesel was created in October 1978 by ex-Kayak drummer Pim Koopman. The group, at first no more than a hobby project, initially consisted of Koopman (drums, keyboard and vocals) and Rob Vunderink (guitar/lead vocals, composer and lyricist), Mark Boon (guitar, composer and lyricist), and Frank Papendrecht (bass; 10 May 1953 – 18 November 2009). Their first album, Watts in a Tank, was released in the Netherlands in 1980. One of its tracks, "Going Back to China," was released in the Netherlands as a single in 1979 and became a Top 40 hit. Two other singles from this album, "Down In The Silvermine" and "Sausalito Summernight" (and also as the misspelled "Sausolito Summernight"), were released in 1980 and also became charting hits. In late 1980, Boon and Papendrecht left to join Meike Touw's Tutti Frutti. They were replaced by bass player Wijnand Ott and guitarist Hugo de Bruin. In mid-1981, Koopman left the band and Kim Weemhoff took the drum seat.

In 1981, Watts in a Tank was released in the United States. The single "Sausalito Summernight" rose to number 25 on the US Top 40. It reached number 1 in Canada. Watts in a Tank itself went up to number 68 on the Billboard 200. This success prompted the return of Mark Boon and an American tour. At Boon's suggestion, guitarist Bas Krumperman joined the band just before the North American tour, moving the band's sound in a country-rock direction. The band got a distribution deal with Atco Records and recorded another album, Unleaded, in 1982, but it was not a success. In the next few years the group had many new members, such as Leen Barbier (guitar/vocals), André Versluijs (bass), Jan Loomans (guitar/vocals), and Henk Hager (guitar/vocals), and released several more singles before disbanding in 1985.

== Reunions and subsequent activities ==
Diesel was reconstituted in 1988 and had a hit in the Netherlands with their single "Samantha", sung by Jeroen Englebert (not to be confused with the different song of the same title that the band featured on their 1982 Unleaded album). The band broke up again in 1989.

Mark Boon later formed The Zoo, releasing the album What's in the Package. Diesel reformed in 2000 with Koopman, Vunderink, Versluijs, Thomas Kroon (drums) and Otto Lenselink (guitar). They released Diesel On The Rocks in 2001, with covers, previously recorded material, and three new tracks.

Watts in a Tank was reissued in 2002, including the original five-minute version of "Sausalito Summernight".

In 2004, the original lineup of Boon, Koopman, Papendrecht and Vunderink performed at a charity event, which led to plans to reform the group on a permanent basis. Papendrecht was replaced later by Werner Cornand.

Both members of Diesel's original rhythm section died from heart attacks within one week: Frank Papendrecht on 18 November 2009 at age 56, and Pim Koopman on 23 November 2009, also at age 56.

In March 2017, Diesel, featuring surviving original members Vunderink and Boon augmented by new members, released a single, "Like Hell I Will!"

== Discography ==
=== Albums ===
Year	Title	NL	US	CAN
1980	Watts In A Tank	38	68	19
1982	Unleaded	—	—	—
2001	Diesel On The Rocks	—	—	—

==== Year-end album charts ====
Chart (1981)	Position
Canada (Watts In A Tank)	62

=== Singles ===
Year	Song	CAN	NL	US
1979	"Alibi"	—	—	—
1979	"Goin' Back To China"	—	34	105
1980	"Down In The Silvermine"	—	16	—
1980	"Sausalito Summernight"	1	33	25
1982	"Leader Of The Pacman"	—	—	—
1984	"Sound Of The 60's"	—	—	—
1985	"Stormy Waters"	—	—	—
1988	"Samantha"	—	41	—
1989	"Colorado"	—	—	—
2017	"Like Hell I Will!"	—	—	—
