= Merlin – Bard of the Unseen =

Studio album by Kayak
- Released: 2003
- Recorded: 2003
- Genre: Progressive rock
- Label: ProActs
- Producer: Ton Scherpenzeel and Pim Koopman

Kayak chronology
| Night Vision (2001) | Merlin – Bard of the Unseen (2003) | Nostradamus - The Fate Of Man (2005) |

Merlin - Bard Of The Unseen is the 11th studio album by the Dutch progressive rock band Kayak. This concept-album is a new version of side 1 of their 1981 album Merlin, with nine new songs added.

At concerts in 2003, the band played this rock-opera in its entirety. Singer Cindy Oudshoorn was credited as special guest on the album, but became a permanent member of the band after the tour.

== Track listing ==
1. "Merlin" - 7:50
2. "Tintagel" - 2:49
3. "The Future King" - 2:58
4. "The Sword In The Stone" - 3:43
5. "When The Seer Looks Away" - 4:18
6. "Branded" - 3:51
7. "At Arthur's Court" - 3:15
8. "The Otherworld" - 7:59
9. "The Purest Of Knights" - 5:48
10. "Friendship And Love" - 5:13
11. "The King's Enchanter" - 2:31
12. "Niniane (Lady Of The Lake)" - 7:08
13. "The Last Battle" - 8:11
14. "Avalon" - 3:44

Words by Irene Linders and Ton Scherpenzeel. Music by Ton Scherpenzeel, except tracks 3, 5, 8, 13: Pim Koopman

== Lineup ==
- Ton Scherpenzeel - keyboards, vocals, percussion
- Pim Koopman - drums, backing vocals, voice-over
- Bert Heerink - lead and backing vocals
- Bert Veldkamp - bass guitar
- Joost Vergoossen - guitars
- Rob Vunderink - guitars, lead and backing vocals

== Guest musicians ==
- Cindy Oudshoorn - lead and backing vocals
- The New Philharmonic Orchestra
