= Coming Up for Air (Kayak album) =

Coming Up For Air

Studio album by Kayak
- Released: 2008
- Recorded: 2007, at KHS Studio, Syco Studio and Shamrock Studio
- Genre: Progressive rock
- Length: 60:14
- Label: SMH
- Producer: Ton Scherpenzeel and Pim Koopman

Kayak chronology
Kayakoustic (2007)	Coming Up For Air (2008)	The Anniversary Box (2008)

Coming Up For Air is the 13th studio album by Dutch progressive rock band Kayak. It was released in 2008. The song "Undecided" was a single in The Netherlands, featuring the non-albumtrack "Beat The Clock".

== Track listing ==
1. "Alienation" (Scherpenzeel/Linders)- 3:55
2. "Man In The Cocoon" (Koopman/Oudshoorn)- 2:53
3. "Time Stand Still" (Scherpenzeel/Linders)- 3:21
4. "Freezing" (Scherpenzeel/Linders)- 3:50
5. "Medea" (Scherpenzeel/Linders)- 3:47
6. "Daughter Of The Moon" (Koopman)- 3:41
7. "Undecided" (Scherpenzeel/Linders)- 4:09
8. "Sad State Of Affairs" (Koopman)- 4:23
9. "About You Without You" (Koopman)- 3:16
10. "The Mask And The Mirror" (Scherpenzeel/Linders)- 4:45
11. "Selfmade Castle" (Koopman/Oudshoorn)- 3:33
12. "What I'm About To Say" (Scherpenzeel/Linders)- 4:24
13. "Wonderful Day" (Scherpenzeel/Linders)- 3:44
14. "Broken White" (Scherpenzeel/Linders)- 4:25
15. "Coming Up For Air" (Scherpenzeel/Linders)- 6:12

== Lineup ==
- Ton Scherpenzeel - keyboards, vocals
- Pim Koopman - drums, keyboards, vocals, guitars
- Edward Reekers - lead and backing vocals
- Cindy Oudshoorn - lead and backing vocals
- Jan van Olffen - bass, vocals
- Rob Vunderink - guitars, lead and backing vocals
- Joost Vergoossen - guitars

== Guest musicians ==
- Judith Groen - cello on "Freezing"
