= Ton Scherpenzeel =

- Scherpenzeel with Kayak in 1974

Background information
- Born: 6 August 1952 (age 74); Hilversum, Netherlands
- Genres: Progressive rock, pop
- Occupations: Keyboardist, composer, arranger, lyricist, record producer
- Instruments: Keyboards, accordion, bass
- Years active: 1969–present
- Member of: Kayak
- Formerly of: Camel, Earth and Fire
- Website: www.tonscherpenzeel.nl

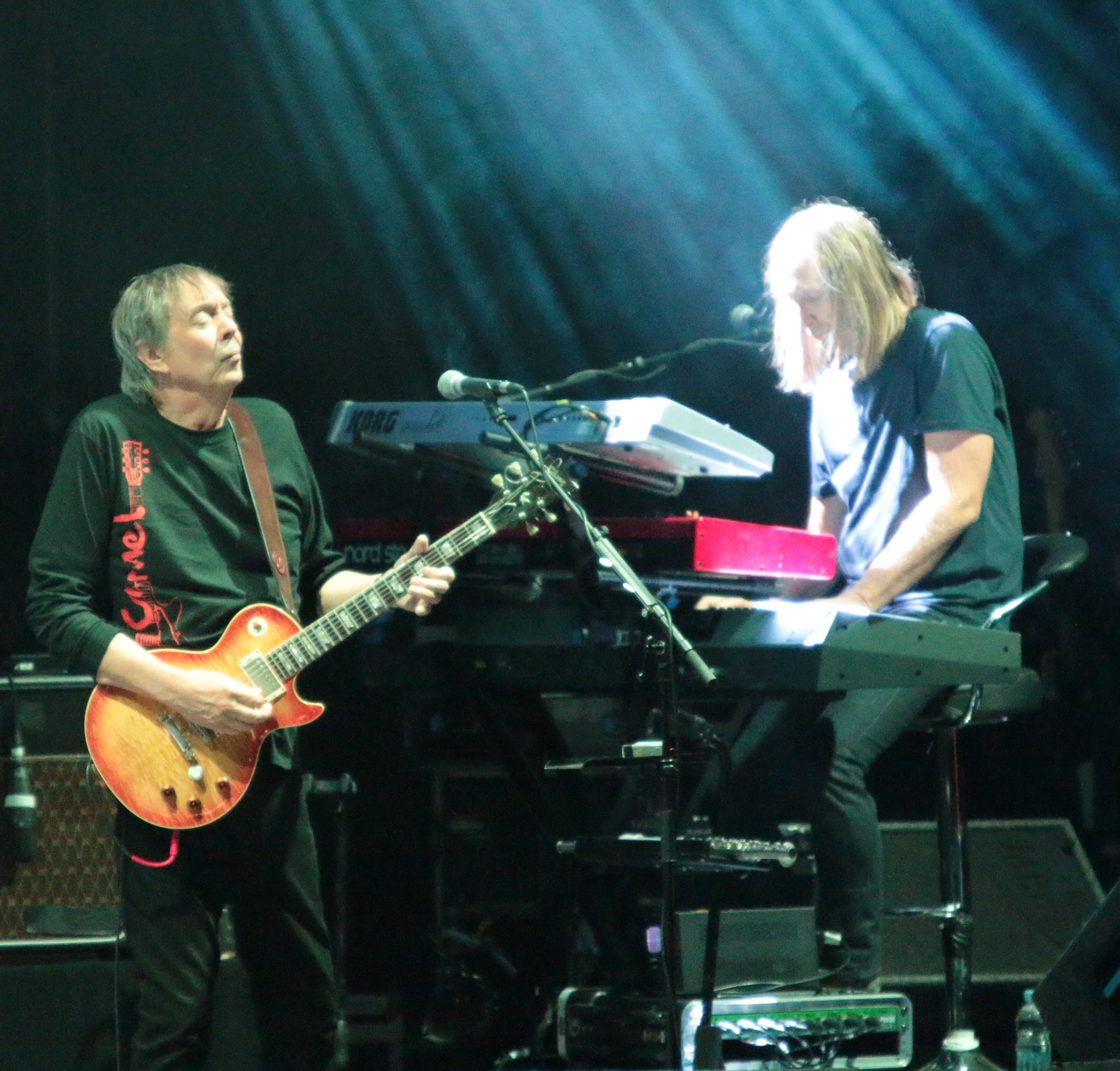
Ton Scherpenzeel touring with Andy Latimer and Camel in 2015.

Ton Scherpenzeel (born 6 August 1952) is a Dutch keyboardist, composer, lyricist, and founding member of Dutch progressive rock band Kayak. Subsequent to Kayak, Scherpenzeel joined British progressive rock band Camel. He also played for several years with Dutch band Earth and Fire and released several solo albums. After his participation in rock bands, he was associated with Dutch vocal project Opus and was the accompanying keyboardist to Dutch comedian Youp van 't Hek.

== Kayak ==
Scherpenzeel is a founding member of Kayak, together with Pim Koopman and Max Werner whom he met while studying at the Hilversum Muziek Lyceum (Hilversum College of Music). The band originated from another college-band, High Tide Formation, with Scherpenzeel on bass guitar. He is the only Kayak member who has played on every Kayak album. Apart from composing the music, writing lyrics, and playing keyboards, he also plays accordion, occasional bass guitar (for instance on the entire Nostradamus album) and double bass. He also provides backing vocals and sings lead vocals on the song "Love's Aglow" on the original Merlin album.

In 2021, Kayak released their 18th studio album, Out of This World. Ton announced in November 2021 that Kayak will embark on their 'Farewell Tour' (spring 2022) throughout The Netherlands, England, Germany, Belgium, Denmark, Sweden and Norway. This will take place during the 50-year anniversary of the band. He did not rule out the possibility of occasional reunion performances.

== Camel ==
Ton was the keyboardist on several Camel albums: Stationary Traveller (1984), Pressure Points: Live in Concert (1984), Dust and Dreams (1991), Rajaz (1999) and he performed live on Camel's 2003 Farewell Tour.

== Composer/producer ==
In addition to his association with progressive rock bands, Ton Scherpenzeel has made a name for himself in the Dutch theatre and film scene as composer/producer of multiple musical productions. In 1980, Scherpenzeel wrote the score for the Dutch movie Spetters by director Paul Verhoeven, featuring Rutger Hauer. From 1990 to 2012 he composed the score for more than 50 musicals for JEUGDTHEATER HOFPLEIN, including 'Bolle Boos', 'Kruimeltje', 'Robin Hood'. He also wrote several music scores for the theater project OPUS ONE, including 'Peter Pan', 'Jungle Book', 'Alice in Wonderland', and more. In 2005, Jeugdtheater Hofplein, Rotterdam, celebrated its 20-year anniversary. The performance was attended by Queen Beatrix of the Netherlands, who met with the actors, musicians and composer (Scherpenzeel-photo) after the performance. From 1984 till present, Scherpenzeel has composed almost all music in songs of Dutch comedian Youp van 't Hek and has also been his accompanist. Ton is scheduled to perform with Youp van 't Hek in live theater shows for De Laatste Ronde tour in 2022 through 2024.

== Solo albums ==
Ton's first solo album (1978) was an adaptation of Le carnaval des animaux by French classical music composer Camille Saint-Saëns. His second solo album, Heart of the Universe (with singer Chris Rainbow), was released in 1984 and is a combination of instrumental and vocal tracks. In 1991, Scherpenzeel released his third solo album Virgin Grounds, under the pseudonym Orion. In 1998 he played a synth solo on the song "Cosmic Fusion", from Ayreon's album Into the Electric Castle, a rock opera on which Kayak vocalist Edward Reekers played one of the main roles. In 2013 Scherpenzeel released his fourth solo CD, The Lion's Dream.

2021: Velvet Armour, the fifth solo album from Ton Scherpenzeel, was released on Friendly Folk Records, an independent label located in Rotterdam, Netherlands. Ton said in an interview with Irish Music Magazine (Nov. 2021) that he was in doubt about releasing an album like Velvet Armour commercially, and had considered releasing demos for free. When he made that statement on social media he was approached by owner of Friendly Folk Records, Kathy Keller, who said she would be interested in releasing the album on her folk label. Ton mentioned that he loved Keller's dedication and enthusiasm and he signed with her label. He also told journalist Sean Laffey during the interview, 'I know I am not your typical folk artist but there are strong similarities and connections to that style'. The eighteen-track album reflects the essence of the Medieval and Renaissance era, with a blend of Baroque folk and progressive rock ballads. The album also includes an old Kayak song, 'My Heart Never Changed', originally released on the album Royal Bed Bouncer in (1975). The album cover artwork for Velvet Armour was created by Henk Philhelmon Bol. Velvet Armour features guest musicians from the Dutch folk scene Rens van der Zalm on fiddle, Annette Visser on flute (ex-Flairck); and from the classical music scene violinist Maria-Paula Majoor with the Matangi String Quartet. Backing vocals by Irene Linders; lead vocals, music, lyrics, arrangements, production, and all other instruments by Ton Scherpenzeel.

In 2022, Velvet Armour was longlisted for Best Album, and the single (track 2), River to the Sea was longlisted on the Celtcast Fantasy Awards, (a music competition for folk genre music).

== Personal life ==
Ton is married to Dutch music journalist Irene Linders, who was also a background vocalist in Kayak for some years in the late 1970s. Together they have a daughter Daphne. Scherpenzeel has a notable fear of flying which has limited his touring on the European continent.

== Discography ==
=== Solo ===
- Le carnaval des animaux (1978)
- Heart of the Universe (1984)
- Virgin Grounds (1991, under the pseudonym Orion)
- The Lion's Dream (2013)
- Velvet Armour (2021)
- Virgin Grounds (2023) - Previously released under the artist's name (Orion) in 1991. This new release has two extra tracks - 1&13.
- Achter De Schermen (2024) - A Selection from Theater Music Written Between 1984 and 2023.

=== Studio albums with Kayak ===
- See See the Sun (1973)
- Kayak II (1974)
- Royal Bed Bouncer (1975)
- The Last Encore (1976)
- Starlight Dancer (1977)
- Phantom of the Night (1979)
- Periscope Life (1980)
- Merlin (1981)
- Eyewitness (1981) (live album)
- Close to the Fire (2000)
- Night Vision (2001)
- Merlin – Bard of the Unseen (2003)
- Nostradamus – The Fate of Man (2005) (double CD)
- Coming Up for Air (2008)
- Letters from Utopia (2009) (double CD)
- Anywhere but Here (2011)
- Cleopatra – The Crown of Isis (2014) (double CD)
- Seventeen (2018)
- Out Of This World (2021)

=== With Earth and Fire ===
- Phoenix (1989)

=== With Camel ===
- Stationary Traveller (1984)
- Pressure Points (1984, live)
- Dust and Dreams (1991)
- Rajaz (1999)

=== With others ===
- Into the Electric Castle (1998, with Ayreon)
