= Cees van Leeuwen =

Dutch politician

Member of the House of Representatives
- In office 2002–2003

Personal details
- Born: 29 April 1951 (age 75) The Hague, the Netherlands
- Party: Pim Fortuyn List
- Occupation: Musician, politician, lawyer

Cornelis Hubertus Johannes (Cees) van Leeuwen (born 1951) is a Dutch former member of parliament for the Pim Fortuyn List (LPF) from 2002 to 2003.

Van Leeuwen was elected as a Member of the House of Representatives at the 2002 election and subsequently served as State Secretary for Education, Culture and Science in the First Balkenende cabinet. He was also a member and former bassist of the Dutch progressive rock group Kayak. He has since worked as a lawyer specializing in employment law and entertainment law.
