= Pim Koopman =

Dutch musician (1953–2009)

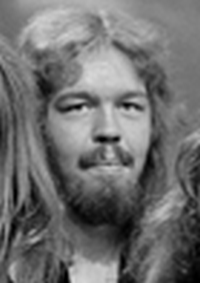
Koopman with Kayak in 1974

Wilhelmus Frederikus "Pim" Koopman (11 March 1953 – 23 November 2009) was a Dutch musician best known as the drummer, percussionist and occasional lead singer of rock band Kayak.

== Biography ==
Born in Hilversum, Koopman co-founded Kayak in 1972, along with Ton Scherpenzeel, Johan Slager and Max Werner. Koopman left the band in 1976 because of health problems and issues with the group's manager. He went on to become a record producer, and was successful with acts such as Maywood, José Hoebee, Valensia, Petra Berger and Robby Valentine. He returned to Kayak for the reunion in 1999, and had been playing drums in Kayak again until his death in 2009.

As a musician, writer, producer and arranger, Koopman was also involved in two other bands: Diesel and The President. In Diesel he worked with (amongst others) Rob Vunderink, who later joined Koopman in Kayak. The President was a collaboration with Okkie Huysdens.

He was the composer of six entries to the Eurovision Song Contest: “Jouw lach" performed by Dick Rienstra (1977), "Later" by Brigitte (1984), "Champagne" and "Déja Vu" by Willeke Alberti (1994) and "De wereld is van jou" by Gina de Wit and "Met of zonder jou" by Clau-Dya's in 1996.

Apart from his work as a musician, Koopman often lent his voice to Dutch versions of cartoons and films. For example, he can be heard in Barnyard, Happy Feet and Lilo & Stitch.

Koopman died on 23 November 2009, at the age of 56, from a heart attack.

== Discography ==
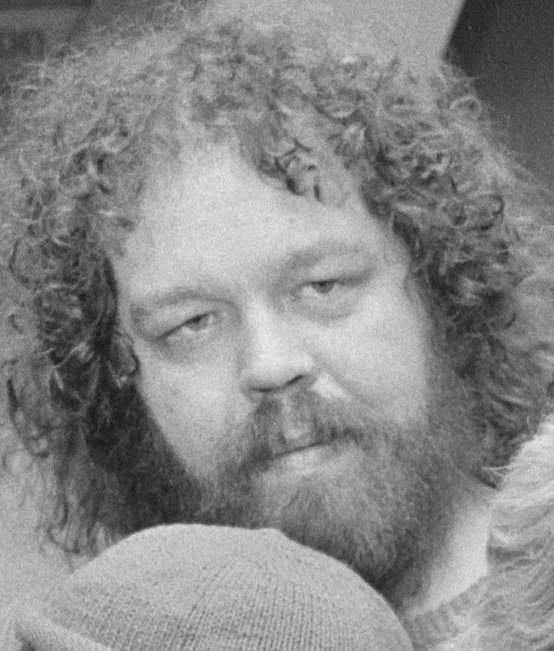
Koopman in 1984

=== Solo ===
- Doctor Vlimmen (soundtrack) (1978)
- Kort Amerikaans (soundtrack) (1979)

=== With Kayak (studio albums) ===
- See See the Sun (1973)
- Kayak II (1974)
- Royal Bed Bouncer (1975)
- The Last Encore (1976)
- Close to the Fire (2000)
- Night Vision (2001)
- Merlin – Bard of the Unseen (2003)
- Nostradamus – The Fate of Man (2005) (Double CD)
- Excerpts from Nostradamus (2005) (Single CD)
- Coming Up for Air (2008)
- Letters from Utopia (2009)

=== With Kayak (live albums) ===
- Chance for a Livetime (2001) (double CD)
- Kayakoustic (2007)
- The Anniversary Concert (2008) (double CD + 'Highlights' DVD)
- The Anniversary Box (2008) (4 CD + DVD)

=== With Diesel (studio albums) ===
- Watts in a Tank (1980)
- Diesel on the Rocks (2000)

=== With The President (studio albums) ===
- By Appointment Of (1983)
- Muscles (1985)
