= Johan Slager =

Dutch musician (1946–2025)

Background information
- Born: 8 June 1946; Amsterdam, Netherlands
- Died: 22 January 2025 (aged 78)
- Genres: Rock
- Instrument: Guitar
- Formerly of: Kayak

Johan Slager (8 June 1946 – 22 January 2025) was a Dutch musician best known as the original guitarist of rock band Kayak. He was born in Amsterdam.

== Biography ==
Slager co-founded the band along with Ton Scherpenzeel, Pim Koopman, and Max Werner in 1972. He left the band in 1982 after nine albums, and returned briefly for a couple of performances in the 1990s. When Kayak reunited in 1999, Johan was replaced by Rob Winter.

During and after his time with Kayak, Slager played with many Dutch artists; he played on albums by Circus Custers, Bolland & Bolland and Ekseption, and formed his own band called Plus Doreen. His guitar sounds can also be heard on albums by his ex-Kayak mates Max Werner and Edward Reekers. In later years, he joined singer Michel van Dijk (Alquin). Together with befriended musicians they played in Dutch pubs, doing mostly covers (Rolling Stones, Bob Dylan, The Band, etc.).

Slager died on 22 January 2025, at the age of 78.
