= Steve Harley discography =

This is the discography of English singer-songwriter Steve Harley, including releases by Cockney Rebel and Steve Harley & Cockney Rebel.

== Studio albums ==
=== Cockney Rebel ===
Year	Title	Peak chart positions	Certification
Year	Title	UK	Certification
1973	The Human Menagerie	–	
1974	The Psychomodo	8	UK: Gold

=== Steve Harley & Cockney Rebel ===
Year	Title	Peak chart positions				Certification
Year	Title	UK	AUS	NLD	NOR	Certification
1975	The Best Years of Our Lives	4	62	11	–	UK: Gold
1976	Timeless Flight	18	98	18	–	UK: Silver
1976	Love's a Prima Donna	28	–	–	–	UK: Silver
2005	The Quality of Mercy	–	–	–	40	

=== Steve Harley ===
Year	Title	Peak chart positions	
Year	Title	UK	AUS
1978	Hobo with a Grin	– (Note: This album did not enter the UK Albums Chart, but did peak at number 50 in the Record Business Album Chart Top 60.)	100
1979	The Candidate	–	–
1992	Yes You Can	–	–
1996	Poetic Justice	–	–
2010	Stranger Comes to Town	187	–
2020	Uncovered	–	–

== Live albums ==
Year	Title	Peak chart positions	Notes
Year	Title	UK	Notes
1977	Face to Face: A Live Recording	40	As Steve Harley & Cockney Rebel
1995	Live at the BBC	–	Live compilation, as Steve Harley & Cockney Rebel
1999	Stripped to the Bare Bones	–	As Steve Harley
2003	Acoustic and Pure: Live	–	As Steve Harley (with Jim Cregan and guests)
2004	Anytime! (A Live Set)	–	As The Steve Harley Band
2013	Birmingham (Live with Orchestra & Choir)	158	As Steve Harley & Cockney Rebel

== Compilations ==
Year	Title	Peak chart positions	Certification
Year	Title	UK	Certification
1975	A Closer Look	–	
1980	The Best of Steve Harley and Cockney Rebel	–	
1981	Collection	–	
1987	Greatest Hits	–	
1988	The Collection	–	
1992	Make Me Smile – The Best of Steve Harley and Cockney Rebel	–	
1998	More Than Somewhat – The Very Best of Steve Harley	82	
1999	The Cream of Steve Harley & Cockney Rebel	–	UK: Silver
2000	Best of the 70's	–	
2005	The Ultra Selection	–	
2006	The Cockney Rebel – A Steve Harley Anthology	–	
2008	The Best of Steve Harley and Cockney Rebel	–	
2012	Cavaliers: An Anthology 1973-1974	–	

== Singles ==
Year	Single	Peak chart positions							Album	Certification
Year	Single	UK	IRE	NED	BEL (FLA)	GER	AUS	US	Album	Certification
1973	"Sebastian"	–	–	2	2	30	–	–	The Human Menagerie	
1974	"Judy Teen"	5	–	26	23	–	–	–	Non-album single	
1974	"Hideaway" (Denmark only)	–	–	–	–	–	–	–	The Human Menagerie	
1974	"Psychomodo"	–	–	–	28	–	–	–	The Psychomodo	
1974	"Mr. Soft"	8	16	–	–	–	–	–	The Psychomodo	
1974	"Big Big Deal"	– (Note: This single did not enter the UK Singles Chart, but did make an appearance in the unnumbered UK Breakers Chart.)	–	–	–	–	–	–	Non-album single	
1975	"Tumbling Down" (US only)	–	–	–	–	–	–	–	The Psychomodo	
1975	"Make Me Smile (Come Up and See Me)"	1	1	5	7	20	17	96	The Best Years of Our Lives	UK: Gold
1975	"Mr. Raffles (Man, It Was Mean)"	13	–	–	–	–	–	–	The Best Years of Our Lives	
1975	"Black or White"	– (Note: This single did not enter the UK Singles Chart, but did reach number 2 in the UK Star Breakers Chart.)	–	–	–	–	–	–	Timeless Flight	
1976	"White, White Dove"	– (Note: This single did not enter the UK Singles Chart, but did reach number 6 in the UK Star Breakers Chart.)	–	–	–	–	–	–	Timeless Flight	
1976	"Here Comes the Sun"	10	7	–	–	–	–	–	Love's a Prima Donna	
1976	"(I Believe) Love's a Prima Donna"	41	–	–	–	–	–	–	Love's a Prima Donna	
1977	"(Love) Compared with You" (US only)	–	–	–	–	–	–	–	Love's a Prima Donna	
1977	"The Best Years of Our Lives" (live single)	–	–	–	–	–	–	–	Face to Face: A Live Recording	
1978	"Roll the Dice"	– (Note: This single did not enter the UK Singles Chart, but did reach number 76 in the Record Business Singles Chart.)	–	–	–	–	–	–	Hobo with a Grin	
1979	"Someone's Coming"	–	–	–	–	–	–	–	Hobo with a Grin	
1979	"Freedom's Prisoner"	58	–	–	–	–	–	–	The Candidate	
1980	"Make Me Smile (Come Up and See Me)" (1st re-issue)	–	–	–	–	–	–	–	The Best of Steve Harley and Cockney Rebel	
1982	"I Can't Even Touch You"	– (Note: This single did not enter the UK Singles Chart, but did reach number 132 in the Record Business Bubbling Under Singles chart.)	–	–	–	–	–	–	Non-album singles	
1983	"Ballerina (Prima Donna)"	51	–	–	–	–	–	–	Non-album singles	
1983	"Make Me Smile (Come Up and See Me)" (2nd re-issue)	–	–	–	–	–	–	–	Non-album singles	
1985	"Irresistible"	81	–	–	–	–	–	–	Non-album singles	
1986	"The Phantom of the Opera" (with Sarah Brightman)	7	–	–	–	–	–	–	The Phantom of the Opera	
1986	"Heartbeat Like Thunder"	–	–	–	–	–	–	–	Non-album single	
1986	"Irresistible" (remixed version)	–	–	–	–	–	–	–	El Gran Senor (unreleased album)	
1988	"Mr. Soft" (re-issue)	–	–	–	–	–	–	–	Non-album singles	
1989	"When I'm with You"	–	–	–	–	–	–	–	Non-album singles	
1992	"Make Me Smile (Come Up and See Me)" (3rd re-issue)	46	–	–	–	–	–	–	Non-album singles	
1992	"Irresistible" (European re-issue)	–	–	–	–	–	–	–	Yes You Can	
1993	"Star for a Week (Dino)" (UK promo)	–	–	–	–	–	–	–	Yes You Can	
1995	"Make Me Smile (Come Up and See Me)" (4th re-issue)	33	–	–	–	–	–	–	Non-album single	
2001	"A Friend for Life"	125	–	–	–	–	–	–	The Quality of Mercy	
2005	"Make Me Smile (Come Up and See Me)" (5th re-issue, 30th Anniversary remix)	55	–	–	–	–	–	–	Non-album single	
2006	"The Last Goodbye"	186	–	–	–	–	–	–	The Quality of Mercy	
2010	"Faith & Virtue"	–	–	–	–	–	–	–	Stranger Comes to Town	
2010	"For Sale. Baby Shoes. Never Worn"	–	–	–	–	–	–	–	Stranger Comes to Town	
2015	"Ordinary People"	–	–	–	–	–	–	–	Non-album single	
2020	"I've Just Seen a Face"	–	–	–	–	–	–	–	Uncovered	
2020	"Out of Time"	–	–	–	–	–	–	–	Uncovered	
"—" denotes the single failed to chart or was not released.

=== As guest artist ===
Year	Single	Peak chart positions		Album
Year	Single	UK	GER	Album
1977	"Dandy in the Underworld" (T. Rex single)	–	–	Dandy in the Underworld
1986	"Live-in World" (The Anti-Heroin Project single)	–	–	It's a Live-in World
1988	"Whatever You Believe" (as Anderson, Harley and Batt)	–	–	Non-album single
2004	"Ich Bin Gott" (as Dossche feat Steve Harley)	–	–	Vulnerabel
2016	"You Can't Always Get What You Want" (as Friends of Jo Cox featuring MP4, Steve Harley, Ricky Wilson, David Gray & KT Tunstall)	136	–	Non-album single

== Videography ==
Title	Year	Format
Live from London	1985	VHS, DVD (2001)
The Come Back, All is Forgiven Tour: Live	1989	VHS, DVD (2012)
Live at the Isle of Wight Festival	2005	DVD
Birmingham (Live with Orchestra & Choir)	2013	DVD
Live in Concert (Recorded at the Music Center De Bosuil in the Netherlands, 2018)	2018	DVD

== See also ==
- List of songs recorded by Steve Harley
