= List of songs recorded by Steve Harley =

This is a list of all songs recorded by Steve Harley, including those under the name Cockney Rebel and Steve Harley & Cockney Rebel.

== Songs ==
Title	Year	Album	Songwriter(s)
2,000 Years from Now	2010	Stranger Comes to Town	Robbie Gladwell, Steve Harley
49th Parallel	1975	The Best Years of Our Lives	Harley
A Friend for Life	2001	The Quality of Mercy	Harley, Jim Cregan
Absolute Beginners	2020	Uncovered	David Bowie
Ae Fond Kiss	2020	Uncovered	Robert Burns/Traditional
The Alibi	1992	Yes You Can	Harley, Cregan, Duncan Mackay, Stuart Elliott
All in a Life's Work	1996	Poetic Justice	Harley
All Men Are Hungry	1976	Timeless Flight	Harley
Amerika the Brave	1978	Hobo with a Grin	Harley
Another Journey	1975	B-side of "Make Me Smile (Come Up and See Me)"	Harley
Audience with the Man	1979	The Candidate	Harley
Back to the Farm	1975	The Best Years of Our Lives	Harley
Ballerina (Prima Donna)	1983	Non-album single	Mike Batt
Bed in the Corner	1974	The Psychomodo	Harley
Before They Crash the Universe	2010	Stranger Comes to Town	Harley
The Best Years of Our Lives	1975	The Best Years of Our Lives	Harley
Big Big Deal	1974	Non-album single	Harley
Black or White	1976	Timeless Flight	Harley
Blinded with Tears	2010	Stranger Comes to Town	Cregan, Harley
Carry Me Again	1976	Love's a Prima Donna	Harley
Cavaliers	1974	The Psychomodo	Harley
Chameleon	1973	The Human Menagerie	Harley
The Coast of Amalfi	2005	The Quality of Mercy	Harley
Crazy Love	1996	Poetic Justice	Van Morrison
Crazy Raver	1973	The Human Menagerie	Harley
Dancing on the Telephone	1992	Yes You Can	Harley, Cregan, Elliott
Death Trip	1973	The Human Menagerie	Harley
Don't Go, Don't Cry	1976	Timeless Flight	Harley
Emma	2020	Uncovered	Errol Brown, Tony Wilson
Everything Changes	1976	Timeless Flight	Harley
Face to Face	1983	B-side of "Ballerina (Prima Donna)"	Harley
Faith & Virtue	2010	Stranger Comes to Town	Harley, Barry Wickens
Faith, Hope and Charity	1978	Hobo with a Grin	Harley
Finally a Card Came	1976	Love's a Prima Donna	Harley
Fire in the Night	1992	Yes You Can	Harley
For Sale. Baby Shoes. Never Worn	2010	Stranger Comes to Town	Harley
Freedom's Prisoner	1979	The Candidate	Harley, Jimmy Horowitz
From Here to Eternity	1979	The Candidate	Harley
G.I. Valentine	1976	Love's a Prima Donna	Harley
Heartbeat Like Thunder	1986	Non-album single	Harley, Mackay
Here Comes the Sun	1976	Love's a Prima Donna	George Harrison
Hideaway	1973	The Human Menagerie	Steve Harley
Hot Youth	1978	Hobo with a Grin	Harley, Mackay
How Can I Tell You	2020	Uncovered	Cat Stevens
How Good It Feels	1979	The Candidate	Harley
(I Believe) Love's a Prima Donna	1976	Love's a Prima Donna	Harley
I Can Be Anyone	1982	B-side of "I Can't Even Touch You"	Harley
I Can't Even Touch You	1982	Non-album single	Harley
(I Don't Believe) God is an Anarchist	1978	Hobo with a Grin	Harley
I Wish It Would Rain	1978	Hobo with a Grin	Roger Penzabene, Barrett Strong, Norman Whitfield
If This is Love (Give Me More)	1976	Love's a Prima Donna	Harley
Innocence and Guilt	1976	Love's a Prima Donna	Harley
Introducing The Best Years	1975	The Best Years of Our Lives	Harley
Irresistible	1985	Non-album single	Harley
Irresistible (remix)	1986	Yes You Can (1992)	Harley
Is It True What They Say?	1976	Love's a Prima Donna	Harley
It Wasn't Me	1975	The Best Years of Our Lives	Harley
I've Just Seen a Face	2020	Uncovered	Lennon–McCartney
Journey's End (A Father's Promise)	2005	The Quality of Mercy	Harley, Lincoln Anderson, Gladwell, James Lascelles, Wickens
Judy Teen	1974	Non-album single	Harley
The Last Feast	2005	The Quality of Mercy	Harley
The Last Goodbye	2005	The Quality of Mercy	Harley, Cregan
The Last Time I Saw You	1996	Poetic Justice	Harley
Lay Me Down	1976	B-side of "Here Comes the Sun"	Harley
The Lighthouse	1992	Yes You Can	Harley
Living in a Rhapsody	1978	Hobo with a Grin	Cregan, Harley, Mackay
Loretta's Tale	1973	The Human Menagerie	Harley
Lost Myself	2020	Uncovered	Crispin Hunt
(Love) Compared with You	1976	Love's a Prima Donna	Harley
Love Minus Zero-No Limit	1996	Poetic Justice	Bob Dylan
Love on the Rocks	1979	The Candidate	Harley
Loveless	1996	Poetic Justice	Harley
Lucky Man	1986	B-side of "Irresistible"	Harley
The Mad, Mad Moonlight	1975	The Best Years of Our Lives	Harley
Make Me Smile (Come Up and See Me)	1975	The Best Years of Our Lives	Harley
Mirror Freak	1973	The Human Menagerie	Harley
Mr. Raffles (Man, It Was Mean)	1975	The Best Years of Our Lives	Harley
Mr. Soft	1974	The Psychomodo	Harley
Muriel the Actor	1973	The Human Menagerie	Harley
My Only Vice	1973	The Human Menagerie	Harley
New-Fashioned Way	1992	Yes You Can	Harley, Mackay
No Bleeding Hearts	2010	Stranger Comes to Town	Harley
No Rain on This Parade	2005	The Quality of Mercy	Harley
Nothing is Sacred	1976	Timeless Flight	Harley
One More Time	1979	The Candidate	Harley
Only You	2020	Uncovered	Harley
Ordinary People	2015	Non-album single	Harley, Cregan, Robert Hart
Out of Time	2020	Uncovered	Jagger/Richards
Panorama	1975	The Best Years of Our Lives	Harley
The Phantom of the Opera (with Sarah Brightman)	1986	The Phantom of the Opera	Andrew Lloyd Webber, Richard Stilgoe, Charles Hart, Batt
Promises	1992	Yes You Can	Harley
Psychomodo	1974	The Psychomodo	Harley
Rain in Venice	1992	Yes You Can	Harley, Robin Le Mesurier
Red is a Mean, Mean Colour	1976	Timeless Flight	Harley
Riding the Waves (For Virginia Woolf)	1978	Hobo with a Grin	Harley
Ritz	1974	The Psychomodo	Harley
Rock and Roll Parade	1974	B-side of "Sebastian"	Harley
Roll the Dice	1978	Hobo with a Grin	Harley, Jo Partridge
Safe	1996	Poetic Justice	Harley
Saturday Night at the Fair	2005	The Quality of Mercy	Harley
Save Me (From Myself)	2005	The Quality of Mercy	Harley
Sebastian	1973	The Human Menagerie	Harley
Seeking a Love	1976	Love's a Prima Donna	Harley
Seeking a Love, Pt. 2	1976	Love's a Prima Donna	Harley
Sidetrack 1	1976	B-side of "(I Believe) Love's a Prima Donna"	Harley
Sidetrack II	1976	Love's a Prima Donna	Harley
Singular Band	1974	The Psychomodo	Harley
Sling It!	1974	The Psychomodo	Harley
Someone's Coming	1978	Hobo with a Grin	Harley, Partridge
Sophistication	1986	Anytime! (A Live Set) (2004)	Harley
Spaced Out	1974	B-side of "Judy Teen"	Harley
Star for a Week (Dino)	1992	Yes You Can	Harley
Star of Belle Isle (with Eddi Reader)	2020	Uncovered	Traditional
Strange Communications	1996	Poetic Justice	Harley
Stranger Comes to Town	2010	Stranger Comes to Town	Harley
Such a Dream	1974	B-side of "Psychomodo" and "Mr. Soft"	Harley
Such is Life	1985	B-side of "Irresistible"	Harley
Sweet Dreams	1974	The Psychomodo	Harley
Take the Men & the Horses Away	2010	Stranger Comes to Town	Anderson, Elliot, Harley, Lascelles, Wickens
That's My Life in Your Hands	1996	Poetic Justice	Harley, Hugh Nicholson
Theme from "Babbacombe Lee"	1989	B-side of "When I'm with You"	Harley
This Old Man	2010	Stranger Comes to Town	Harley
Throw Your Soul Down Here	1976	B-side of "White, White Dove"	Harley
Too Much Tenderness	1976	Love's a Prima Donna	Harley
True Love Will Find You in the End	2010	Stranger Comes to Town	Daniel Johnston
Tumbling Down	1974	The Psychomodo	Harley
Two Damn'd Lies	1996	Poetic Justice	Harley
Understand	1976	Timeless Flight	Harley
Victim of Love	1992	Yes You Can	Harley, Ian Nice, Kevin Powell, Wickens, Rick Driscoll
The Waggon	1992	B-side of "Irresistible"	Harley
Waiting	1978	B-side of "Roll the Dice"	Harley
Warm My Cold Heart	1986	B-side of "Heartbeat Like Thunder"	Harley
What Becomes of the Brokenhearted?	1996	Poetic Justice	James Dean, Paul Riser, William Weatherspoon
What Ruthy Said	1973	The Human Menagerie	Harley
When I Paint My Masterpiece	2020	Uncovered	Bob Dylan
When I'm with You	1989	Non-album single	Harley, Cregan, Elliott
When the Halo Slips	2005	The Quality of Mercy	Harley, Cregan
White, White Dove	1976	Timeless Flight	Harley
Who's Afraid?	1979	The Candidate	Harley
Woodchopper	1979	The Candidate	Harley
Young Hearts (The Candidate)	1979	The Candidate	Harley

== As a featured artist ==
Title	Year	Album	Songwriter(s)	Notes
Dandy in the Underworld	1977	Dandy in the Underworld	Marc Bolan	Backing vocals on track by T. Rex
Harrow on the Hill	1990	Poetry in Motion	Sir John Betjeman, Mike Read	Guest vocals on track on various artists compilation, recorded in 1986, released in 1990
Ich Bin Gott	2004	Vulnerabel	Guido Dossche	Guest vocals on Dossche solo album track, released as a single as Dossche feat Steve Harley
Live-in World	1986	It's a Live-in World	The Anti-Heroin Project	Guest vocals on charity single benefitting the Phoenix House Charity
No Name	1981	1984	Rick Wakeman, Tim Rice	Guest vocals on Wakeman solo album track
Pandora	1978	Dear Anyone...	Don Black, Geoff Stephens	Guest vocals on track of Dear Anyone... (musical)
The Voice	1977	I Robot	Alan Parsons, Eric Woolfson	Guest vocals for The Alan Parsons Project album track
Time is No Healer	1978	Score	Mackay, Harley	Guest vocals on Mackay solo album track
Whatever You Believe	1988	Non-album charity single	Batt	Released as Anderson, Harley & Batt
You Can't Always Get What You Want	2016	Non-album charity single	Mick Jagger, Keith Richards	Released as Friends of Jo Cox featuring MP4, Steve Harley, Ricky Wilson, David Gray & KT Tunstall

== Unreleased songs ==
Title	Year	Notes
All for Thee	1971	Solo recording as Steve Nice at Venus Recording Studios.
Into My Room	1971	Solo recording as Steve Nice at Venus Recording Studios.
Laid in the Shade By Maria	1971	Solo recording as Steve Nice at Venus Recording Studios.
Once from You	1971	Solo recording as Steve Nice at Venus Recording Studios.
Purple Annie Blues	1971	Solo recording as Steve Nice at Venus Recording Studios.
Silver and Gold	1971	Solo recording as Steve Nice at Venus Recording Studios.
Spring (This) Is Only the Beginning	1971	Solo recording as Steve Nice at Venus Recording Studios.
White Raven	1971	Solo recording as Steve Nice at Venus Recording Studios.
Oh How Happy	c. 1985	Intended for the unreleased 1986 album El Gran Senor.
All I Ask of You	1986	Recorded with Sarah Brightman for Andrew Lloyd Webber's musical The Phantom of the Opera. Discarded when Michael Crawford replaced Harley in the title role.
The Music of the Night	1986	Also recorded for The Phantom of the Opera and produced by Mike Batt.
Limbs of Men	1989	Recorded in Point Studios, London, in 1989.
Not Alone Anymore	c. 1989	A cover of the Traveling Wilburys song, intended for the album which was released as Yes You Can in 1992.
The Sun Ain't Gonna Shine (Anymore)	2019	A cover of the Frankie Valli/Walker Brothers song, intended for Uncovered.

== Songs produced for other artists ==
Title	Artist	Album	Year	Notes
Tumbling Down	Yvonne Keeley	Non-album single	1974	Co-produced with Alan Parsons
Loretta's Tale	Yvonne Keeley	B-side of "Tumbling Down"	1974	Co-produced with Alan Parsons
Concrete and Clay	Yvonne Keeley	Non-album single	1975	
Hideaway	Yvonne Keeley	B-side of "Concrete and Clay"	1975	
So Ashamed	Dennis Conoley	Non-album single	1975	
Don't Ever Leave Me	Dennis Conoley	B-side of "So Ashamed"	1975	
Love Where Are You Now That I Need You	Patricia Paay	Beam of Light	1975	
Million Dollars	Patricia Paay	Beam of Light	1975	
Stairway to Heaven	Patricia Paay	Beam of Light	1975	
Children Come Home	Patricia Paay	Beam of Light plus A-side of single release	1975	
Can You Please Crawl Out Your Window	Patricia Paay	Beam of Light plus A-side of single release	1975	
Understand	Patricia Paay	Beam of Light	1975	
Beautiful Woman	Patricia Paay	Beam of Light	1975	
Sebastian	Patricia Paay	Beam of Light	1975	
Tiger and a Lion	Patricia Paay	Beam of Light	1975	
Tour de France	Royal Family	Non-album single	1979	
Little Girls	Royal Family	B-side of "Tour de France"	1979	
(I Love You) Pitter Patter	Zero-G	Non-album single	1980	
I Can't Get Started	Zero-G	B-side of "(I Love You) Pitter Patter"	1980	
Entertaining Mr. Sloane	Sloane	Non-album single	1980	
Get It While You're Young	Sloane	B-side of "Entertaining Mr. Sloane" and "Doing The Best I Can"	1980	
Blown It	Gary Shail	Non-album double A-side single	1980	
Blown It	Phil Davis	Non-album double A-side single	1980	
Doing The Best I Can	Sloane	Non-album single	1980	
Holding Treasure	Shoc Corridor	Train of Events plus A-side of single release	1984	
Flame	Gene Loves Jezebel	B-side of the single "Desire"	1985	
