= A Closer Look (Steve Harley & Cockney Rebel album) =

Compilation album by Steve Harley & Cockney Rebel
- Released: October 1975
- Genre: Rock
- Length: 47:37
- Label: EMI

Steve Harley & Cockney Rebel chronology
The Best Years of Our Lives (1975)	A Closer Look (1975)	Timeless Flight (1976)

A Closer Look is a compilation album by Steve Harley & Cockney Rebel, which was released by EMI Records in the United States in October 1975. It features material recorded by the original Cockney Rebel as well as the reformed Steve Harley & Cockney Rebel line-up.

== Background ==
A Closer Look was released as an attempt to raise awareness and provide Steve Harley & Cockney Rebel with a commercial breakthrough in the United States. Between 1973 and 1975, the band had achieved commercial and critical success in the UK and Europe, but had only a cult following in the US. The compilation was released to coincide with the band's first tour of the US in late 1975 as a support act for The Kinks.

The ten tracks on the compilation are taken from the band's three studio albums up to that point, The Human Menagerie (1973), The Psychomodo (1974), and The Best Years of Our Lives (1975). It included all of the singles released by the band, with the exception of "Judy Teen". A Closer Look failed to provide the band with a commercial breakthrough. Cockney Rebel would see their only appearance in the US charts with "Make Me Smile (Come Up and See Me)", which reached number 96 on the Billboard Hot 100 in March 1976.

In a 1975 interview with the American magazine Scene, Harley spoke of his mixed feelings on the compilation, "That album is loosely termed a 'greatest hits' album, which is embarrassing for me, because I've never had one hit record in America. The album is a magnified version of the other [three] albums. I can't say I'm behind the idea all the way; I sort of feel like I'm prostituting myself. But I can understand why it is being done. I'd rather people picked up the other LPs for what they are."

== Release ==
A Closer Look was released by EMI Records as a vinyl LP in the United States only, with Capitol Records handling the manufacturing and distribution. In the attempt to gain interest in the compilation in the UK, adverts were placed in music magazines announcing the compilation was available from EMI International as a "special import". The album was given its first CD release in 2001, when it was issued by BGO Records as a double-album set with the band's 1976 album Love's a Prima Donna.

== Critical reception ==
Professional ratings
Review scores
Source	Rating
AllMusic	3/5 stars
The Encyclopedia of Popular Music	3/4 stars

On its release, Cash Box considered A Closer Look to "showcase Harley as a songwriter of subtleties". The reviewer wrote, "Shot through his songs are word diversions and innuendos that prove a natural attribute when paired off with a ballad and light pop aura. Harley's neutral vocal stance proves the right vehicle for the songs while loose instrumentals buoy up the proceedings." They concluded, "A Closer Look is Harley at a slightly eccentric and totally entertaining musical purge." R. B. Ragg of the Oakland Tribune wrote, "A Closer Look shines a beacon of light on Harley's desperately excellent lyrics and his band. Alternating between schizophrenia, romantic tears and bolero sidesteps, Harley appears to be a captivating new force in English rock and roll."

Pierre-Rene Noth of the Milwaukee Journal stated, "Harley does an unusual cabaret style rock marred in the past by great inconsistency. This selection finally provides Harley with what he needed most – some severe editing. In the process, A Closer Look becomes a unique album by a unique artist." Keith Sharp of the Calgary Herald commented, "If anything, A Closer Look chronicles the change in musical direction this band has taken during the past years, caused mainly by a rash of personnel changes. Although Harley's music is an acquired taste to say the least, tracks such as 'Mirror Freak', 'Hideaway', 'Mr. Raffles' and 'Psychomodo' make this album worth listening to."

In a retrospective review, Donald A. Guarisco of AllMusic considered A Closer Look to be a "nice sampler of this group's glory days", with a good balance between the band's "short pop tunes that blended clever lyrics with hook-filled tunes" and their "lengthier, often orchestrated epics that allowed Harley to give full rein to his arty ambitions". He concluded, "Although it omits some crucial hits like 'Judy Teen' and was released too early to include anything from the excellent Love's a Prima Donna, A Closer Look remains a solid introduction to the career of an underrated but very worthwhile group from the artier side of glam rock."

== Track listing ==
All songs written and composed by Steve Harley.

No.	Title	Length
1.	"Make Me Smile (Come Up and See Me)"	3:58
2.	"Mr Raffles"	4:32
3.	"Panorama"	5:36
4.	"Hideaway"	3:47
5.	"Sebastian"	6:55
6.	"Sweet Dreams"	2:03
7.	"Psychomodo"	4:02
8.	"Mr Soft"	3:17
9.	"Mirror Freak"	5:10
10.	"Tumbling Down"	5:51

== Personnel ==
Cockney Rebel

- Steve Harley – vocals (all tracks)
- Jean Paul-Crocker – cello, bow bass, electric violin, mandolin, electric guitar (tracks 4–5, 9)
- Milton Reame-James – organ, electric piano, harpsichord (tracks 4–5, 9)
- Paul Jeffreys – bass guitar (tracks 4–5, 9)
- Stuart Elliott – drums (all tracks)

Steve Harley & Cockney Rebel

- Steve Harley – vocals (all tracks)
- Jim Cregan – guitar (tracks 1–3, 6–8, 10)
- Duncan MacKay – keyboards (tracks 1–3, 6–8, 10)
- George Ford – bass guitar (tracks 1–3, 6–8, 10)
- Stuart Elliott – drums (all tracks)

Production

- Steve Harley – producer (tracks 1–3, 6–8, 10)
- Alan Parsons – producer (tracks 1–3, 6–8, 10)
- Neil Harrison – producer (tracks 4–5, 9)

Other

- Roy Kohara – art direction
- Chuck Ames – design
