= Hideaway (Cockney Rebel song) =

1974 song by Cockney Rebel

Single by Cockney Rebel

from the album The Human Menagerie
- B-side: "Loretta's Tale"
- Released: 1974
- Genre: Rock
- Length: 3:52
- Label: EMI
- Songwriter: Steve Harley
- Producer: Neil Harrison

Cockney Rebel singles chronology
"Judy Teen" (1974)	"Hideaway" (1974)	"Psychomodo" (1974)

"Hideaway" is a song by the British rock band Cockney Rebel, fronted by Steve Harley. Released as the opening track on the band's 1973 debut album The Human Menagerie, "Hideaway" was released in 1974 as a single in Denmark only. It was written by Harley and produced by Neil Harrison.

== Background ==
Following the commercial success of the band's debut single "Sebastian" on the European continent, as well as the band's 1974 follow-up "Judy Teen", EMI Records decided to release "Hideaway" as a single in Denmark only. Neither Harley or Cockney Rebel had any input regarding the release of the single. "Hideaway" was first performed by Harley during his days of busking in the early 1970s, before Cockney Rebel were formed in late 1972. Having trained as a journalist for three years, Harley embarked on his musical career through "floor-spotting" within London folk clubs in 1971–72. In 1972, Harley began busking in London, in subways and walkways under and in such places as Hyde Park Corner, Marble Arch, Leicester Square and Covent Garden.

Like the entire The Human Menagerie album, "Hideaway" was recorded sometime during June and July 1973 at Air Studios in London. At that time, the studios were located in Oxford Street above a department store. "Hideaway" was the first song the band recorded during the sessions, and it would also appear as the opening track on the album.

In 1975, Dutch singer Yvonne Keeley covered "Hideaway" as the B-side to her EMI single "Concrete and Clay". Both tracks were produced by Harley, who was Keeley's boyfriend at the time. The single did not enter the UK Top 50.

== Release ==
"Hideaway" was released by EMI Records on 7-inch vinyl in Denmark only. The single's B-side, "Loretta's Tale", was also taken from The Human Menagerie, and was written by Harley and produced by Harrison. The single was issued with a black-and-white picture sleeve, featuring a photograph of the band.

Later in 1976, EMI released a 7-inch vinyl extended play in the UK, containing four of the band's tracks, with a song appearing from each of their albums. The first of the four tracks was "Hideaway", chosen to represent The Human Menagerie.

Following its original release on The Human Menagerie and as a single, the song has appeared on a number of Steve Harley & Cockney Rebel compilations, including A Closer Look (1975), The Very Best Of Steve Harley & Cockney Rebel (1980) and Make Me Smile - The Best of Steve Harley And Cockney Rebel (1992). In addition, the song has appeared on two various artist compilations: the Arcade release Listen to the Music (1981), and the EMI release This is Rock For Ever (1991).

On the 2012 anthology Cavaliers: An Anthology 1973-1974, a previously unreleased, early version of "Hideaway" was included on disc three.

== Promotion ==
The song was performed at the band's concerts of the time. In 1974, they made their first appearance on BBC's Old Grey Whistle Test, where one of the songs they performed was "Hideaway". This live version would later appear on disc four of Cavaliers: An Anthology 1973-1974, along with another 1974 performance of the song for the BBC "In Concert".

In April 1975, Steve Harley & Cockney Rebel performed the song during their concert at the Hammersmith Odeon, London. The performance was filmed and released as a film titled Between the Lines. The footage, including an audio version, was later included on the 2014 definitive edition of The Best Years of Our Lives album.

In recent years, the song has been occasionally performed live by Harley. In November 2012, the band performed the song live at the Birmingham Symphony Hall. On the night, Harley and the band, supported by an orchestra and chamber choir, performed the first two Cockney Rebel albums in their entirety, including "Hideaway". It was released on CD and DVD in 2013 as Birmingham (Live with Orchestra & Choir).

== Critical reception ==
In a review of The Human Menagerie, Geoff Thompson of the Bracknell Times described "Hideaway" as a delightful track on which Harley "sounds a dead-ringer for Bryan Ferry". In their review of the album, US magazine Billboard picked "Hideaway" as the album's best cut. Gary Tannyan of The StarPhoenix commented, "'Hideaway' starts off with Crocker leading in with a classical guitar bit and overdubbing that with his bee-like buzzing violin. Elliott's drumming is crisp and Reame-Smith's electric piano provides fine vibraphone-like aquatic shimmers."

In a 2004 review of the album, Geoff Barton of Classic Rock said: "It's about time The Human Menagerie was recognised as a classic. It begins hesitantly with 'Hideaway', but builds insidiously until the arrival of the fifth track, the immense and immortal 'Sebastian'". On the webzine Get Ready to Rock!, a 2013 review of the Birmingham (Live with Orchestra & Choir) album commented how the album opened with the "beguiling and delicate touch of 'Hideaway', which could easily fit into Mark Knofler's current set, albeit without the guitar."

== Track listing ==
7-inch single

1. "Hideaway" – 3:52
2. "Loretta's Tale" – 4:13

== Personnel ==
Cockney Rebel

- Steve Harley – vocals
- Jean-Paul Crocker – electric violin, guitar
- Milton Reame-James – keyboards
- Paul Jeffreys – Fender bass
- Stuart Elliott – drums, percussion

Production

- Neil Harrison – producer
- Geoff Emerick – engineer
