= The Best Years of Our Lives (Steve Harley & Cockney Rebel album) =

Studio album by Steve Harley & Cockney Rebel
- Released: 7 March 1975
- Recorded: November–December 1974
- Length: 40:45
- Label: EMI
- Producers: Steve Harley; Alan Parsons

Steve Harley & Cockney Rebel chronology
The Psychomodo (1974)	The Best Years of Our Lives (1975)	Timeless Flight (1976)

Singles from The Best Years of Our Lives
- 1. "Make Me Smile (Come Up and See Me)" Released: 31 January 1975; 2. "Mr. Raffles (Man, It Was Mean)" Released: 23 May 1975

The Best Years of Our Lives is the third studio album by Steve Harley & Cockney Rebel, released by EMI on 7 March 1975. It was the first album to feature Harley's name ahead of the band's (the band was previously known as Cockney Rebel). The album was produced by Harley and Alan Parsons, and contains the band's only UK number one, the million-selling "Make Me Smile (Come Up and See Me)".

== Background ==
In July 1974, the original Cockney Rebel split at the end of a major British tour which promoted their second album The Psychomodo. Jean-Paul Crocker, Milton Reame-James and Paul Jeffreys quit the band after Harley refused to comply with their demands to write material for the group, despite the initial understanding that Cockney Rebel was a vehicle for Harley's songs. Unfazed by the split, Harley announced to Record Mirror that he was going to return with "the greatest rock 'n' roll band ever heard". In 2014, he recalled, "The people at EMI were right behind me. They believed I could find new band members without too much of a problem and continue on to a new level of success. They believed it wasn't a major stumbling block."

As Cockney Rebel were already scheduled to play Friars Aylesbury and the Reading Festival on 24 and 25 August respectively, Harley quickly assembled a temporary line-up. With original member Stuart Elliott remaining on drums, the line-up featured guitarist Jim Cregan, keyboardist Francis Monkman and bassist George Ford. The permanent line-up was finalised in September 1974 and featured the same musicians minus Monkman, who was replaced by Duncan Mackay. Harley renamed the new group Steve Harley & Cockney Rebel. The band performed their first concerts in Holland between 18 and 26 September 1974 before playing their first UK dates between 17 and 19 October 1974 at Southampton University, London's Rainbow Theatre and Lancaster University.

The Best Years of Our Lives was recorded at London's Abbey Road Studios and Air Studios during November and December 1974. Harley's approach to the recording sessions was different compared to that of the original two Cockney Rebel albums, The Human Menagerie and The Psychomodo. Rather than have his songs and ideas "well written out" before recording began, Harley had "just some tunes and phrases spinning around my head". He told Rock Scene in 1975, "The band thought I was crazy, and I had to teach them the songs by humming along. They didn't even have lyrics to go with the backing tracks. I added them all on later. I just went la-de-da through the whole thing."

Speaking to Record & Popswop Mirror in November 1974, Harley said of the album, "The best work I've done yet is on the new LP. I find that I'm not writing in such a surrealistic way anymore. I'm writing slightly more blatant, less subtle. The whole album is a theme. The whole story is a dialogue, almost between two people – or a group of people and the artist: questions and answers. It's kind of like a guy who goes through a metamorphosis and comes out of it in good shape – alive and kicking." He added to the magazine in 1975, "This album is something I believe in. It means so much to me than anything I have done before." In a 1976 interview with Sounds, Harley recalled about the album, "[It] was a better production [than The Psychomodo], but in retrospect it was a group of guys that had only been together three or four weeks trying to sound like a group. Best Years sounded kinda like me in the studio." He felt that the next album, Timeless Flight (1976), presented the band far more cohesively.

== Songs ==
Harley has called "It Wasn't Me" "pretty horrific" lyrically. He said in 1975: "Lyrically it comes from a nightmare. It's a story about the physical and mental destruction of an old lady, putting her inside a lunatic asylum." Harley wrote "Panorama" "in the form of a 1970s 12-bar blues, a very modern blues". He added: "It's fast and is written in minor chords. It's [about] me and what I've been through in the past few months." "Back to the Farm", which has a 7/4 time signature, was inspired by Harley's rock 'n' roll lifestyle and fame, and the pressures that came with it. He described the song in 2003 as being about "going crazy" and called it a "mental institution allusion". In 1975, he said: "It's pretty mad, pretty scatty, and gets progressively madder." Harley had the idea making the backing vocals "sound like chipmunks". The title track was inspired lyrically by the concept of the 1946 American drama film of the same name. Harley revealed in 1975: "My story is of a changed man who has in fact entered the best years of his life even though on the surface they appear to be the worst."

== Release ==
Preceding the release of The Best Years of Our Lives was the single "Make Me Smile (Come Up and See Me)", which was released in January 1975. As the band's biggest hit, the song reached the number one spot in the UK Singles Chart in February and received a silver certification that month. As of 2015, it has sold around 1.5 million copies in the UK. Years later, Harley revealed that the lyrics were vindictively directed at Harley's former band members who, he felt, had abandoned him. Over 120 cover versions of the song have been recorded by other artists.

The Best Years of Our Lives was released by EMI on 7 March 1975 and reached number 4 in the UK Albums Chart. The album's second single, "Mr. Raffles (Man, It Was Mean)", was released in May and became another UK hit, peaked at number 13. The song's titular character refers to the author E. W. Hornung's fictional thief A. J. Raffles.

The album received its first CD release by EMI in 1991. It featured two bonus tracks, the B-side of "Make Me Smile (Come Up and See Me)", "Another Journey", and a live version of "Sebastian", which was the B-side to "Mr. Raffles (Man, It Was Mean)". In 2001, BGO Records released a remastered edition of the album, but without any bonus tracks.

On 23 June 2014, a definitive edition of the album was released by Parlophone as a four CD + DVD box-set. On disc one is the original album, the B-side "Another Journey", and previously unreleased early demo versions of "Make Me Smile (Come Up And See Me)" and "The Best Years of Our Lives". The second and third discs feature tracks from the band's concert at the Hammersmith Odeon on 14 April 1975, and the 28-minute DVD features footage from the same concert. In August 2014, a 180-gram vinyl reissue of the album was released in the Netherlands by Music on Vinyl. To celebrate its 45th anniversary, Chrysalis released an expanded edition of the album on double vinyl in the UK and Europe on 5 April 2021.

For its 50th anniversary, Chrysalis are due to reissue the album on CD/DVD and vinyl on 20 June 2025. The expanded three-disc CD and DVD hardback set will feature a new stereo mix of the original album by Alan Parsons, a disc of outtakes and alternative mixes, and a DVD with concert footage from the Hammersmith Odeon (plus an audio version) and other video. The set also contains new liner notes by Peter Doggett, including interviews with Cregan, Elliott, Mackay and Parsons, and previously unseen photographs by Mick Rock and Michael Putland. In addition, a blu-ray audio release is also being issued as an exclusive to Super Deluxe Edition under their Surround Series. It will include four new mixes of the album by Parsons: Dolby Atmos, 5.1, stereo and stereo instrumental mixes.

== Tour ==
To promote the album, the band embarked on a UK and European tour from March 1975 onwards. On the tour, the band hired guitarist Snowy White to play rhythm guitar. In a January 1975 issue of Record & Popswop Mirror, it was announced that the upcoming tour would feature "a specially built set and lighting to reflect songs and images featured on the forthcoming album". Later in the year they toured America, as a support act for The Kinks.

To celebrate the 40th anniversary of the album and "Make Me Smile", a 16-date UK tour was announced for November 2015. Harley, who has continued to play with various Cockney Rebel incarnations since the 1970s, reunited with the surviving members of the original second line-up for the tour: Jim Cregan, Stuart Elliott and Duncan Mackay. It marked the first time that Harley and his three bandmates had played together since 1976. Speaking to Classic Rock, in March 2015, Harley commented, "The three guys are still my mates. The fun we had back then, when we toured and recorded together, holds fabulous and special memories. I'm thrilled to think they'll be up there on the great UK concert hall stages with me once again." As original bassist George Ford died in 2007, the then Cockney Rebel bassist Marty Prior took his place. The band were also joined by current Cockney Rebel violinist and guitarist Barry Wickens, as well as the MonaLisa Twins (Mona and Lisa Wagner) on guitar, percussion and backing vocals. On the tour, the band performed two sets at each show, one featuring a selection of tracks from Harley and the band's career, and the second featuring The Best Years of Our Lives in its entirety.

== Critical reception ==
Professional ratings
Review scores
Source	Rating
Disc	4/4 stars

On its release, Record & Popswop Mirror commented, "Forget No 1 singles; this will change everything. In eight songs, which have both poetic form and quality, Harley wipes out his two-album apprenticeship with a stunning change of direction and commitment. It is a coming of age, a political and religious protest, a brilliant snap-book for a generation, a puzzle. In short, this third album demands attention. It is completely fulfilling, a monster unleashed." Disc considered Cockney Rebel's original two albums to "pale into insignificance" against The Best Years of Our Lives, with the album displaying "Steve's talent with melodies, paces and rhythm while emphasising his very unusual way with words". The reviewer noted the "fine selection of songs" and picked "Panorama" and the title track as their favourites. Liverpool Echo wrote, "'Make Me Smile' is undoubtedly one of the best singles of the year but this should not obscure the rest of the album. Taken overall it is a great improvement on his previous efforts."

Pete Butterfield of the Reading Evening Post commented, "Like Harley or not, he's got a heap of talent. This album is as full of ideas as the first stemming wholely from the unique vocal talent." John Falding of the Birmingham Daily Post wrote, "One man who must have been listening to too much Ziggy, and more than a little Dylan, is Steve Harley. The Best Years of Our Lives is a poor pastiche of Bowie a couple of years ago. Harley has made an interesting single but the LP does not match it."

In the US, Cash Box believed the band had "a surefire smash with their latest". They wrote, "The band cooks and grinds in the David Bowie style with the emphasis on the spacey light pop rock sound that is very heavy today in the pop market. This should get heavy FM play with our favorites 'The Mad, Mad Moonlight,' 'It Wasn't Me,' 'Make Me Smile (Come Up and See Me)' and the title cut." Justin Pierce of the Los Angeles Times stated, "Stylistically, [the album] compares favorably with the acoustically based David Bowie/Mott the Hoople school of rock. Harley continues to explore themes built around his views of a confused society and the changes it is constantly enduring. Harley's writing is still in an embryonic stage, but there is promise." Keith Sharp of the Calgary Herald commented, "All of a sudden, Harley's decided to take himself seriously. Those bizarre, humorous lyrics that marked his last album have been replaced by Dylanesque social comment. He can't blame his band for the poor quality of the record. His new Rebels have saved the album by at least making it listenable."

=== Retrospective reviews ===
Professional ratings
Review scores
Source	Rating
AllMusic	4/5 stars
Classic Rock	8/10 stars
Mojo	4/5 stars
Record Collector	5/5 stars
Select	3/5 stars
Q	4/5 stars

In a review of the 1991 EMI CD release, Mark Sinker of Select highlighted the "baroque glam-pop charts hits" "Make Me Smile (Come Up and See Me)" and "Mr. Raffles". Donald A. Guarisco of AllMusic retrospectively said, "Harley had developed a strong grasp of how to combine his artistic ambitions with strongly crafted pop tunes. The result was The Best Years of Our Lives, the most successful album of his mid-'70s heyday. All in all, it is a fine, slickly crafted album that will delight Steve Harley enthusiasts." John Aizlewood of Q magazine called it "supremely confident, it showcased Harley's knack for an anthem, willingness to rock and sheer gall". Aizlewood, writing of the 2021 LP reissue for Mojo in 2021, added that, while "Make Me Smile" "proved to be Harley's pension plan", its parent album was "more than the hit plus filler". He called "Mr. Raffles" Harley's "most beautiful track", and also noted the "heroically self-indulgent" title track and the "slinky" "49th Parallel".

In a review of the 2025 50th anniversary edition, Aizlewood, writing for Classic Rock, praised the album as a "treat" that has been "given a swish remix by original co-producer Alan Parsons". James McNair of Mojo stated that the edition has been "remixed to goosebump-inducing effect by the LP's original, all-important overseer Alan Parsons". Terry Staunton of Record Collector remarked that much of the album saw Harley "dial down the Bowie pastiches of old and lean more toward Bob Dylan territory". He added how the "brassy strut" of "Panorama" and the "cryptic theatricality" of "Back to the Farm" "stand out in a collection of songs bursting with ideas and attitudes that remains his most successful, and most loved by fans". Johnny Sharp, writing for Uncut, gave the album an 8 out of 10 rating and stated that, beyond "Make Me Smile", the "reggae tinges" of "Mr. Raffles" have "dated less well", but the "glam-informed Southern boogie of 'Panorama' and the funky '49th Parallel' still swagger irresistibly".

== Track listing ==
All songs written and composed by Steve Harley.

No.	Title	Length
1.	"Introducing The Best Years"	1:07
2.	"The Mad, Mad Moonlight"	4:30
3.	"Mr. Raffles"	4:33
4.	"It Wasn't Me"	6:02
5.	"Panorama"	5:38
6.	"Make Me Smile (Come Up and See Me)"	4:00
7.	"Back to the Farm"	5:53
8.	"49th Parallel"	3:13
9.	"The Best Years of Our Lives"	5:45

1991 EMI CD bonus tracks
No.	Title	Length
10.	"Another Journey" (B-side of "Make Me Smile (Come Up and See Me)")	2:52
11.	"Sebastian" (live at Hammersmith Odeon)	10:54

2014 Parlophone definitive edition CD1 - bonus tracks
No.	Title	Length
1.	"Another Journey" (B-side of "Make Me Smile (Come Up and See Me)")	2:51
2.	"Mr Raffles (Man, It Was Mean)" (single version)	3:03
3.	"Make Me Smile (Come Up and See Me)" (rough mix)	3:17
4.	"The Best Years of Our Lives" (acoustic version)	5:31

2014 Parlophone definitive edition CD2 - Live at Hammersmith 14 April 1975 - Part 1
No.	Title	Length
1.	"The Mad, Mad Moonlight"	5:13
2.	"Hideaway"	3:19
3.	"Panorama"	6:02
4.	"Medley ("Bed in the Corner", "Sweet Dreams", "Psychomodo" and "Sling It!")"	14:10
5.	"Sebastian"	13:31
6.	"Mr. Raffles (Man, It Was Mean)"	5:08
7.	"Back to the Farm"	6:43

2014 Parlophone definitive edition CD3 - Live at Hammersmith 14 April 1975 - Part 2
No.	Title	Length
1.	"49th Parallel"	3:43
2.	"Death Trip"	14:39
3.	"Judy Teen"	3:17
4.	"Mr. Soft"	3:16
5.	"The Best Years of Our Lives"	5:06
6.	"Make Me Smile (Come Up and See Me)"	4:34
7.	"Tumbling Down"	11:04

2025 Chrysalis 50th anniversary edition CD1 bonus track
No.	Title	Length
10.	"Another Journey" (B-side of "Make Me Smile (Come Up and See Me)")	2:51

2025 Chrysalis 50th anniversary edition CD2
No.	Title	Length
1.	"Another Journey" (early version)	3:30
2.	"It Wasn't Me" (outtake)	6:26
3.	"The Mad, Mad Moonlight" (rehearsal version)	5:30
4.	"Back to the Farm" (instrumental rehearsal)	2:11
5.	"49th Parallel" (rehearsal)	3:44
6.	"Panorama" (vocal run through)	6:37
7.	"Make Me Smile (Come Up and See Me)" (false start)	0:52
8.	"Make Me Smile (Come Up and See Me)" (rough mix)	3:17
9.	"Another Journey" (acoustic demo)	1:32
10.	"The Best Years of Our Lives" (rehearsal version)	1:45
11.	"The Best Years of Our Lives" (acoustic version)	5:28

== Personnel ==
Steve Harley & Cockney Rebel

- Steve Harley – vocals
- Jim Cregan – electric guitar, acoustic guitar, backing vocals
- George Ford – bass guitar, string bass, backing vocals
- Duncan Mackay – electric piano, grand piano, elka, clavinet, synthesizer, Hammond organ
- Stuart Elliott – drums, percussion, marimba

Additional musicians

- Tina Charles – backing vocals
- Martin Jay – backing vocals
- Yvonne Keeley – backing vocals
- Linda Lewis – backing vocals
- Liza Strike – backing vocals

Production

- Steve Harley – producer
- Alan Parsons – producer, engineer, mixing
- Gary Edwards – tape operator
- Peter James – tape operator
- Andrew Powell – horn and brass arrangement (track 5)
- Chris Blair – mastering

Design

- Mick Rock – photography, sleeve design
- George Hardie – lettering

== Charts ==
Chart (1975)	Peak position
Australia (Kent Music Report)	62
Dutch Albums Chart	11
Finnish Albums (Suomen virallinen lista)	21
UK Albums Chart	4
US Record World 151-200 Album Chart	182

2021 reissue

Chart (2021)	Peak position
Scottish Albums (Official Charts)	42
UK Albums Sales Chart (OCC)	68
UK Independent Albums (Official Charts)	22
UK Physical Albums Chart (OCC)	57
UK Vinyl Albums Chart (OCC)	22

2025 reissue

Chart (2025)	Peak position
Scottish Albums (Official Charts)	11
UK Albums Sales Chart (OCC)	12
UK Independent Albums (Official Charts)	7
UK Physical Albums Chart (OCC)	11

== Certifications ==
Region	Certification	Certified units/sales
United Kingdom (BPI)	Gold	100,000^{^}
^{^} Shipments figures based on certification alone.
