= Birmingham (Live with Orchestra & Choir) =

Live album by Steve Harley & Cockney Rebel
- Released: 14 October 2013
- Genre: Rock
- Length: 95:47
- Label: Comeuppance Ltd; Absolute

Steve Harley & Cockney Rebel chronology
Cavaliers: An Anthology 1973–1974 (2012)	Birmingham (Live with Orchestra & Choir) (2013)	Uncovered (2020)

Birmingham (Live with Orchestra & Choir) is a live album by Steve Harley & Cockney Rebel, featuring the Orchestra of the Swan and Chamber Choir. It was recorded live at the Birmingham Symphony Hall on 24 November 2012, and was released on both CD and DVD on 14 October 2013.

== Background ==
"It's been a long time coming - something like 39 years. Now we're here, at last, with an orchestra and a choir and a big rock band, to play those first two albums pretty well the way they appeared on the original vinyl. Maybe some things should never change, in spite of progress. Welcome, my old friends."

— Steve Harley quoted on the inner sleeve of the CD.

For many years, Steve Harley had considered performing the first two Cockney Rebel albums - 1973's The Human Menagerie and 1974's The Psychomodo - in their entirety, with an orchestra and choir. In 2011, he began planning the one-off concert, and had originally considered the Cadogan Hall or Royal Festival Hall in London for the performance. In a July 2011 online diary entry, Harley commented: "I know now for certain that those albums will be wonderful to play, backed by orchestra and choir, and I'm determined to press on with that idea. It may mean no other UK rock band shows all next year, so the tickets can sell. The costs will be astronomical, so the tickets must shift. Pride, too, will factor in all this. I want to play to a sold-out hall."

By the end of the year, serious planning for the concert began. In January 2012, contracts were signed and tickets went on sale. Initially, the tickets were offered exclusively on Harley's website for a few weeks before their official release to the general public. The concert, now finalised to be played at Birmingham Symphony Hall, received strong ticket sales before their general release. In a February 2012 diary entry, Harley added: "The anticipation is quite thrilling in itself". He also announced that "Judy Teen" would be played at the concert, as well as the possible inclusion of "Black or White". Around this same time, Harley held a meeting with Andrew Powell, the conductor behind the original album's orchestral arrangements. Powell later agreed to conduct the orchestra at the concert. English musician Steve Norman of Spandau Ballet fame was also confirmed to play with the band on the night. By mid-April 2012, only an approximate 150 seats were left to sell.

In June, the first rehearsals were held, while Harley announced that the concert would be recorded using a mobile recording studio, for a future CD release. While a DVD release was also being considered, it was not a certainty. Largely dependent on cost, Harley commented in his diary: "To do it properly needs five cameras. The editing process is costly beyond most people's imagination. The costs of filming the concert to the highest quality, weighed against the potential income, make it an unlikely contender, at least as a Comeuppance production. One alternative is to approach film companies who specialise in such jobs." In the end, Harley chose Goodmedia Limited to film the show.

On 24 November 2012, the band performed the sold-out concert, which featured approximately 50 performers on stage. Aside from the two albums, the band also played "Judy Teen", "Stranger Comes to Town" and "Black or White". The concert received a favourable reception from fans and critics. The Times rewarded the show four out of five stars, with writer David Sinclair describing it as an "extraordinary concert". Tim Jones of Record Collector commented the show "served up a sumptuous 140 minutes of vintage fare" and that it was "bookended by standing ovations". A day after the show, Harley commented in his diary: "Symphony Hall came, and went. Hard to believe it's behind us, to be honest. All the reactions from many of those who were there, I feel humble and touched. Never in a career close to forty years long, have I felt such a rush, such a warm glow, as I did during that first minute or two, preparing to break open the riff of 'Hideaway'."

In January 2013, Harley announced plans for a follow-up concert to be played at Manchester's Bridgewater Hall in April 2014. He also revealed that he had already started working on mixing the recording of the Birmingham concert. In early April, the mixing of the tracks was completed, with the possibility of getting the double CD released in June. By June, Harley had started mixing the film footage of the show for a DVD release. He worked with the film and music production company Goodmedia. Harley commented: "It will be a really good film. Looking at the footage, I am glad, really glad I decided to go for it." Work on the DVD continued through the summer.

Both the CD and DVD versions of Birmingham were released in October 2013 by Harley's own Comeuppance Ltd and Absolute (via Universal). The CD edition, running approximately 95 minutes, features 24 tracks in total, six of which are introductions or short speeches from Harley. The DVD version has an approximate duration of 116 minutes. On 26 October 2013, the album entered the UK Independent Chart at No. 36. It also reached No. 158 on the UK Top 200 Albums Chart.

In November 2013, three further performances of the same concert were announced in addition to the upcoming Manchester concert. After the Manchester concert in April, Harley, the band and the orchestra, performed the show three times in June 2014, at Sage Gateshead, London's Royal Albert Hall, and again at the Birmingham Symphony Hall.

== Critical reception ==
Professional ratings
Review scores
Source	Rating
Classic Rock	9/10 stars
Bolton News	favourable

Upon its release, Geoff Barton of Classic Rock reviewed the live album, stating: "This set preserves the occasion for posterity – and it's simply breathtaking. What could've been a bloated ego trip works brilliantly; Harley thrives on the big production, delivering a performance that marries abundant charisma with sensitive vulnerability. The epic 12-minute 'Death Trip' chills and thrills in equal measure, and 'Tumbling Down' does exactly the same. The eclectic glam rock of 70s chart-busters 'Judy Teen' and 'Mr Soft' is reproduced with stunning accuracy, and 'Sling It!', is full of spit and sawdust. [Harley's] songs sound as fresh as on the day they were conceived." Martin Hutchinson of Bolton News said: "I was privileged to be at this gig, which sold out almost immediately when tickets went on sale. The music was perfection both on the night and on this two-disc release. Steve's appreciation of his musicians and audience is apparent in the short bursts of speech that crop up here and there. Those fans who were unable to get to Birmingham on the night will be able to hear the culmination of Steve's dream. And those who were there can relive a unique night."

Terry Staunton of Record Collector reviewed the DVD edition of the performance, giving it four out of five stars. He commented: "The increasingly common practice of artists performing landmark albums in their entirety is taken up a notch here, as Harley pulls out all the stops in replicating his first two releases with Cockney Rebel. These are songs that established Harley as a single-minded maverick with a strong vision, and it's interesting to watch his expressions change from studious band leader determined to get every note perfect to joyously grinning rock star who's realised he's pulled the whole thing off with aplomb."

== Track listing ==
=== Disc One ===
All tracks are written by Steve Harley.

No.	Title	Length
1.	"Introduction"	0:40
2.	"Hideaway"	4:10
3.	"What Ruthy Said"	3:28
4.	"Loretta's Tale"	4:19
5.	"Crazy Raver"	4:07
6.	"Sebastian"	7:44
7.	"Mirror Freak"	5:28
8.	"Speech"	0:53
9.	"My Only Vice"	2:51
10.	"Muriel the Actor"	3:57
11.	"Speech"	0:49
12.	"Judy Teen"	3:53
13.	"Chameleon"	0:54
14.	"Death Trip"	10:01

=== Disc Two ===
All tracks are written by Steve Harley.

No.	Title	Length
1.	"Introduction"	0:14
2.	"Sweet Dreams"	2:29
3.	"Psychomodo"	4:18
4.	"Mr Soft"	4:24
5.	"Singular Band"	3:09
6.	"Ritz"	8:53
7.	"Cavaliers"	9:14
8.	"Speech"	0:13
9.	"Bed in the Corner"	3:27
10.	"Sling It!"	3:10
11.	"Stranger Comes to Town"	4:32
12.	"Black or White"	8:38
13.	"Speech"	1:34
14.	"Tumbling Down"	8:18

== Personnel ==
Band

- Steve Harley – vocals, guitar
- Barry Wickens – violin, mandolin
- Robbie Gladwell – guitar
- James Lascelles – piano, keyboards
- Lincoln Anderson – bass
- Adam Houghton – drums

Additional musicians

- Orchestra of the Swan and their Chamber Choir
- Andrew Powell – orchestra conductor
- Ashleigh Lartey – backing vocals, percussion
- Faye Lartey – backing vocals, acoustic guitar
- Steve Norman – saxophone, percussion

Production

- Stuart Bruce – live recording and mixing engineer
- Andy Linklater – front of house sound
- Graham Blake – stage monitor engineer
- Dr John Milner – orchestral audio engineer
- Roger Searle – production manager

Sleeve

- Mark Scarfe at Aarlsen – sleeve design, artwork
- Jas Sansi – photography

== Charts ==
Chart (2013)	Peak position
UK Albums Chart	158
UK Independent Albums (Official Charts)	36
UK Physical Albums Chart (OCC)	96
