= Whatever You Believe =

Single by Anderson, Harley & Batt (AH&B)
- B-side: "Whatever You Believe (Live Version)"; "Deep is My Yearning (Morning Has Broken)"
- Released: November 1988
- Genre: Pop
- Length: 5:10
- Label: Epic
- Songwriter: Mike Batt
- Producer: Mike Batt

Steve Harley singles chronology
""Mr. Soft" (re-issue)" (1988)	"Whatever You Believe" (1988)	"When I'm with You" (1989)

"Whatever You Believe" is a song by the British singer-songwriter Mike Batt, which was originally recorded and released as a collaboration charity single featuring Batt with Jon Anderson of Yes and Steve Harley of Cockney Rebel. Released in November 1988, the single tied-in with that year's ITV Telethon. The song was written and produced by Batt.

== Background ==
The song was performed during a live TV broadcast at Battersea Park in London on 3 May 1988, as part of the Thames/LWT charity fundraising effort for the ITV Telethon. Arranged and conducted by Batt, the song's performance saw him accompanied by Anderson and Harley on lead vocals, and backed by the Central Band of the Royal Air Force and the London-based Royal Choral Society. Furthermore, over 2,000 members of the general public contributed to the performance as a choir. Each person paid a donation to receive a copy of the song's sheet music to take part. The Central Band of the Royal Air Force appeared courtesy of Wing Commander Eric Banks. After this performance, Anderson, Harley and Batt would also record a studio version of the song. Later released as a single in November 1988, it failed to enter the top 100 of the UK Singles Chart.

== Release ==
"Whatever You Believe" was released by Epic Records on 7-inch and 12-inch vinyl in the UK only. For the 7" vinyl release, the studio version of "Whatever You Believe" was the A-side and the ITV Telethon live version the B-side. The 12-inch release included a third track, the traditional "Deep is My Yearning (Morning Has Broken)", performed by the Central Band of the Royal Air Force. It was arranged and conducted by Eric Banks, and was produced by Batt.

== Critical reception ==
Upon its release, Jim Whiteford of the Dundee Evening Telegraph called "Whatever You Believe" "a stirring anthem". Paul Massey of Aberdeen Evening Express wrote, "Jon, Steve and the man who gave us The Wombles get together for a tear-jerking ITV Telethon ballad. At least it's for a good cause." Mick Mercer of Melody Maker commented, "I was begged to review this, what with it being a charity single, so I am. Being fairly charitable myself at this time of year I would suggest it is nauseatingly pappy, unattractive crap."

== Track listing ==
7-inch single

1. "Whatever You Believe" (Studio Version) – 5:10
2. "Whatever You Believe" (Live Version) – 6:03

12-inch single

1. "Whatever You Believe" (Studio Version) – 5:10
2. "Whatever You Believe" (Live Version) – 6:03
3. "Deep Is My Yearning" (Morning Has Broken) – 2:46

== Personnel ==
- Jon Anderson – vocals
- Steve Harley – vocals
- Mike Batt – conductor on "Whatever You Believe"
- The Central Band of the Royal Air Force – featured performers
- The Royal Choral Society – featured performers

Production

- Mike Batt – producer (all tracks), arranger on "Whatever You Believe"
- Dick Lewsey – engineer on studio version of "Whatever You Believe"
- Gavin Greenaway – sound supervisor on live version of "Whatever You Believe"
- Steve Murrell – engineer on live version of "Whatever You Believe"
- Tom Hunter (LBC) – event co-ordinator
- Michael Heyland (Cancer Research) – event co-ordinator
- Eric Banks – arranger, conductor on "Deep is My Yearning"

Other

- Neil Ashton – photography
- Tomcat – artwork

== Other versions ==
- In 1991, Batt featured the song in his West End musical The Hunting of the Snark.
- In 1992, Irish singer Finbar Wright recorded his own version of "Whatever You Believe" for his solo album of the same name. Batt produced, arranged and conducted the album, which reached No. 1 in Ireland. The title track has become a Christmas classic in the country.
- In 2014, Bob Blakeley released his own version of the song on his album Performance. Having signed to Batt's record label, Dramatico Entertainment, Blakeley's cover was also produced by Batt.
