= Cavaliers: An Anthology 1973–1974 =

Compilation album by Cockney Rebel featuring Steve Harley
- Released: 29 October 2012
- Genre: Rock/pop, glam rock, progressive rock
- Label: EMI

Cockney Rebel featuring Steve Harley chronology
Stranger Comes to Town (2010)	Cavaliers: An Anthology 1973–1974 (2012)	Birmingham (Live with Orchestra & Choir) (2013)

Cavaliers: An Anthology 1973–1974 is a remastered four-disc box-set anthology by Cockney Rebel, released by EMI on 29 October 2012. The set chronicles the recording career of the original line-up of Cockney Rebel between 1973 and 1974. It includes both of the band's albums in full, The Human Menagerie (1973) and The Psychomodo (1974), as well as all the singles and non-album B-sides. It also features early alternative versions and mixes of tracks from both albums, as well as live sessions for the BBC, including a John Peel session and on the Old Grey Whistle Test.

Cavaliers: An Anthology 1973–1974 was released on CD in the UK and Europe. The set was mastered and remastered at Abbey Road Studios by Adam Nunn. The liner notes, under the heading "Young, Feisty and Fearless", were written by Harley, in which he recalls the writing of the songs, the early stages of his career, the formation of Cockney Rebel and the recording of the two albums with the original line-up.

Harley also revealed in the liner notes that he was considering performing the two Cockney Rebel albums in their entirety. Later that year, on 24 November, Harley and his band would perform the two albums at the Birmingham Symphony Hall, with a 50-piece orchestra and chamber choir. The performance was released in 2013, titled Birmingham (Live with Orchestra & Choir).

== Content ==
Disc one features The Human Menagerie, along with four bonus tracks. A DJ edit of "Sebastian" was originally created for radio play. "Rock and Roll Parade" was B-side to "Sebastian". "Judy Teen" was the band's first UK hit in 1974, with the B-side being "Spaced Out".

Disc two features The Psychomodo, along with two bonus tracks. "Such a Dream" was the B-side to "Mr. Soft", while "Big Big Deal" was released in November 1974 as Harley's non-album solo debut.

Disc three largely consists of previously unreleased alternative versions, as well as other mixes, mainly of The Human Menagerie album. The alternative versions had been recently discovered at the time. The early version of "Judy Teen" is dated 1 March 1973, recorded at Audio International Studios. A stereo mix of "Crazy Raver" is included, along with an unedited version of "Rock and Roll Parade", an alternative mix of "Mr. Soft" and the full version of "Big Big Deal".

Disc four features live performances from the band at the BBC in Concert, on the Old Grey Whistle Test and a John Peel Session. The five tracks from the band 'In Concert' at the BBC were recorded on 22 January 1974 at the Hippodrome, Golders Green in London. It was first transmitted on 26 January 1974, and was introduced by Pete Drummond. The two tracks from the Old Grey Whistle Test were recorded on 10 February 1974 at the BBC TV Centre in London. The John Peel session, featuring five tracks, was produced by Tony Wilson for the BBC. It was recorded at Langham 1 on 28 May 1974, and was first transmitted on 11 June 1974. The two Old Grey Whistle Test tracks had not appeared on CD before, while much of the other performances on disc four were previously released on the 1995 Windsong International compilation Live at the BBC.

== Critical reception ==
Professional ratings
Review scores
Source	Rating
AllMusic	4/5 stars
Mojo	4/5 stars
Q	3/5 stars
Uncut	8/10

Upon its release, Q reviewed the anthology and wrote: "These first two albums, spread over four CDs to encompass demos, live versions and extraneous singles, show how close Harley came to greatness." Jim Wirth of Uncut described the set as a "4CD triumph for art-pop's 'Cocky Rabble'". He added: "The high-concept theatrical rock showcased on Cockney Rebel's first two albums is bigger on bravado than innovation, but Harley's determination, control freakery, and incipient narcissism scythe compellingly through Cavaliers, demo recordings, Peel Sessions, live material and all." Mojo described the compilation as "Steve Harley's glam origins across four CDs. Melodically rich, playful and charismatic."

Stephen Thomas Erlewine of AllMusic commented: "This collection is not for the casual fan, but rather for those who want to dig deep, and those may not be limited to Harley fanatics, either. During these early years, Cockney Rebel blurred the lines between prog, glam, Canterbury, Roxy, and other arty flights of fancy, slowly gathering a sense of style and flash. The Human Menagerie is a little gangly but The Psychomodo is a full-stop gem, and fortunately that's the period that gets the greatest exploration here. Certainly, this box is for serious listeners, but it offers plenty of surprises and pleasures within its four discs."

== Track listing ==
All songs written and composed by Steve Harley.

=== Disc one ===
No.	Title	Length
1.	"Hideaway"	3:52
2.	"What Ruthy Said"	2:32
3.	"Loretta's Tale"	4:13
4.	"Crazy Raver"	3:47
5.	"Sebastian"	6:59
6.	"Mirror Freak"	5:13
7.	"My Only Vice"	2:52
8.	"Muriel the Actor"	4:11
9.	"Chameleon"	0:48
10.	"Death Trip"	9:54
11.	"Sebastian (DJ Edit)"	3:54
12.	"Rock and Roll Parade"	2:55
13.	"Judy Teen"	3:45
14.	"Spaced Out"	3:01

=== Disc two ===
No.	Title	Length
1.	"Sweet Dreams"	2:05
2.	"Psychomodo"	4:03
3.	"Mr. Soft"	3:17
4.	"Singular Band"	3:00
5.	"Ritz"	7:17
6.	"Cavaliers"	8:33
7.	"Bed in the Corner"	3:32
8.	"Sling It!"	2:43
9.	"Tumbling Down"	5:58
10.	"Such a Dream"	5:07
11.	"Big Big Deal"	4:33

=== Disc three ===
No.	Title	Length
1.	"Sebastian (Early Version)"	8:17
2.	"Hideaway (Early Version)"	4:06
3.	"Chameleon (Early Version)"	0:49
4.	"Death Trip (Early Version)"	8:51
5.	"Loretta's Tale (Early Version)"	4:48
6.	"Crazy Raver (Early Version)"	4:04
7.	"Mirror Freak (Early Version)"	5:37
8.	"My Only Vice (Early Version)"	2:59
9.	"Rock and Roll Parade (Early Version)"	3:31
10.	"Judy Teen (Early Version)"	4:11
11.	"Crazy Raver (Stereo Mix)"	3:46
12.	"Rock and Roll Parade (Unedited Version)"	3:29
13.	"Mr. Soft (Alternate Mix)"	3:22
14.	"Big Big Deal (Full Version)"	5:36

=== Disc four ===
No.	Title	Length
1.	"Hideaway (At the BBC in Concert 1974)"	5:03
2.	"Crazy Raver (At the BBC in Concert 1974)"	3:50
3.	"Loretta's Tale (At the BBC in Concert 1974)"	4:40
4.	"Sebastian (At the BBC in Concert 1974)"	7:37
5.	"Death Trip (At the BBC in Concert 1974)"	11:26
6.	"Hideaway (Old Grey Whistle Test 1974)"	4:16
7.	"My Only Vice (Old Grey Whistle Test 1974)"	2:48
8.	"Bed in the Corner/Sling It! (John Peel Session 1974)"	6:08
9.	"Mr Soft (John Peel Session 1974)"	3:16
10.	"Sweet Dreams/Psychomodo (John Peel Session 1974)"	5:44

== Personnel ==
Cockney Rebel

- Steve Harley – vocals
- Jean-Paul Crocker – electric violin, guitars, mandolin
- Milton Reame-James – keyboards
- Paul Jeffreys – Fender bass
- Stuart Elliott – drums, percussion

The Human Menagerie

- Neil Harrison – producer
- Geoff Emerick – engineer
- Andrew Powell – orchestral arrangements
- Star Trek Enterprises – original sleeve design
- Peter Vernon – photography

The Psychomodo

- Steve Harley – producer
- Alan Parsons – producer
- Peter Flanagan (Morgan Studios) – engineer
- Richard Dodd (Nova Studios) – engineer
- Geoff Emerick (AIR London) – engineer
- John Middleton (AIR London) – engineer
- Andrew Powell – orchestral arrangements
- Mick Rock – original sleeve design, photography

Other

- Neil Harrison – producer of "Rock and Roll Parade"
- Steve Harley – producer of "Judy Teen", "Spaced Out", "Such a Dream" and "Big Big Deal"
- Alan Parsons – producer of "Judy Teen", "Spaced Out" and "Such a Dream"
- Pete Coleman – engineer on "Judy Teen (Early Version)"
- Pete Swettenham – engineer on "Big Big Deal"
- Tony Wilson – producer of 1974 BBC John Peel session tracks

Anthology

- Nigel Reeve – EMI A&R, project co-ordination
- Hugh Gilmour – EMI A&R, artwork design
- Demetri Georgiou – project co-ordination
- Peter Vernon – photography (where known)
- Adam Nunn – mastering, remastering
- Clive Munday, Graeme Anderson (at EMI) – thanks
- Cary Anning, Ian Pickavance, Lucy Launder (at Abbey Road Studios) – thanks
- Simon Gurney (at BBC Worldwide) – thanks
- Stewart Griffin (assistance and memorabilia) – thanks
- Rachel (at Comeuppance Ltd.) – thanks
