= The Psychomodo =

Studio album by Cockney Rebel
- Released: 2 June 1974; January 1975 (US)
- Recorded: February–March 1974
- Genre: Glam rock
- Length: 40:25
- Label: EMI
- Producer: Steve Harley, Alan Parsons

Cockney Rebel chronology
The Human Menagerie (1973)	The Psychomodo (1974)	The Best Years of Our Lives (1975)

Singles from The Psychomodo
- 1. "Psychomodo" Released: 17 May 1974; 2. "Mr. Soft" Released: 26 July 1974; 3. "Tumbling Down" Released: January 1975 (US only)

The Psychomodo is the second studio album by Cockney Rebel, released on 2 June 1974 by EMI. It was produced by Steve Harley and Alan Parsons.

== Background ==
Cockney Rebel's debut album, The Human Menagerie, was released in 1973 and failed to make an appearance in the UK Albums Chart. The single "Sebastian" was also a failure in the UK but did achieve success in Continental Europe. The lack of UK success for Cockney Rebel left their label, EMI, feeling the band had yet to record a potential hit single. In response, Harley went away and reworked his unrecorded song "Judy Teen", which was released in March 1974 and became a UK Top 5 hit. By the time the single was released, Cockney Rebel were already in the process of recording their second album, The Psychomodo.

From 25 May to 7 July 1974, Cockney Rebel embarked on a major British tour to promote The Psychomodo. Due to the success of "Judy Teen", which was climbing the UK charts while the band were on the tour, some of the concerts saw riots break out and others had to be rebooked at larger venues due to the demand for tickets. As the tour progressed, Cockney Rebel faced growing tensions which ultimately led to their split at the end of the tour in late July. Jean-Paul Crocker, Milton Reame-James and Paul Jeffreys quit the band after Harley refused to comply with their demands to write material for the group, despite the initial understanding that Cockney Rebel was a vehicle for Harley's songs.

Later in 1974, Harley finalised a new line-up for the band and then continued recording and touring under the name Steve Harley & Cockney Rebel. The only remaining member of the original line-up to continue with Harley was drummer Stuart Elliott. In 1975, the band reached the UK number-one spot with "Make Me Smile (Come Up and See Me)", the lyrics of which were vindictively directed at Harley's former band members who, he felt, had abandoned him.

In a March 1974 interview with Melody Maker, Harley compared the album to The Human Menagerie, "The difference is in feel. There's more ego. The first album was flat. You listen to it and the violin and piano player are taking solos and it's, 'Do you mind if I step out and take a solo? I apologise, but it is my solo.' This one they say, 'Get out of my way, I'm coming through, and I want the spotlight on me.' They're making a statement. The first LP talks a lot and says nothing. This time, there's no talking, no chatting. Everything said is a statement and a valid one."

Speaking to Record & Popswop Mirror in November 1974, Harley spoke of The Psychomodo in relation to his songwriting for the next Cockney Rebel album, The Best Years of Our Lives, "I find that I'm not writing in such a surrealistic way anymore. I'm writing slightly more blatant, less subtle. I mean the subtleties of The Psychomodo tended to get lost I think. I think 'Sling It' is probably the best concealed important statement on the album, but it's gone above everyone's head as far as I can make out." He added that The Psychomodo was "very much a concept: psychomodal – stream of consciousness". In a 1976 interview with Sounds, Harley considered The Psychomodo as the "most important" and the "most original, the one with excitement on it" out of the first three Cockney Rebel albums.

== Recording ==
Cockney Rebel recorded The Psychomodo in February and March 1974 at Morgan Studios, Nova Sound Studios and Air Studios in London. It was mastered at Abbey Road Studios. The album saw Harley receive his first production credit, as he produced the album alongside producer Alan Parsons. In similarity to "Sebastian" and "Death Trip" from The Human Menagerie, a large symphony orchestra and choir was used on "Tumbling Down", with orchestral arrangements conducted by Andrew Powell.

In 2012, Harley recalled of his experience recording the album, "The Psychomodo was a record whose time we laughed through. Alan Parsons came in as co-producer and his own willingness to accept many offbeat ideas made life easy enough. More strings and horns, and again we had Andrew Powell, with his brilliant classical-rock thinking, to orchestrate."

In a 1974 interview with Music Scene, violinist Jean-Paul Crocker expressed his opinion that The Psychomodo was a much stronger album than The Human Menagerie. He commented, "I think it's more of a development than could ever have been expected. It's a completely different album and the basic difference is in the way we're playing on it. We wanted the first album to be heavier than it was, but it turned out quite weak, and we sounded like a bleedin' folk group most of the time."

== Songs ==
In an interview with Sounds in 1976, Harley revealed that much of the material on The Psychomodo was inspired by his imagination of what it would be like to be a successful rock star: "I've always known the impermanence and uncertainty of rock stars. I've thrived on that edge. Psychomodo was about that and I wrote the album before it even happened to me. I was a nobody when I wrote all those what-it's-like-to-be-a-rock-star-songs."

Harley picked "Cavaliers" as his personal favourite out of his own compositions in late 1974. Speaking to Beat Instrumental, Harley said, "It probably isn't my best song in the sense of being well structured but it says so much in a short space. It moves me when I hear it. It brings things home to me, great things that I must have been seeing when I wrote it." "Sling It!" was originally written as a poem and was heavily inspired musically by Bob Dylan's 1967 song "All Along the Watchtower". After completing the poem, which he described as a "sustained metaphor", Harley believed the overall theme was similar to that in "All Along the Watchtower", except he was "saying it entirely differently". This inspired him to adopt a similar musical composition. In a 1975 interview with Trouser Press, Harley stated, "It's one of my favourites because lyrically it says everything I wanted to say. I just didn't want to be bothered with finding an original tune. The frantic 'Watchtower' three-chord rhythm was the only way I could express the emotion. It was deliberate, conscious – not [to] nick but parody."

== Release ==
The Psychomodo was released by EMI in the UK and Europe in June 1974. According to Harley at the time of its upcoming release, the album generated approximately 12,000 advance sales. Preceding the album was the first single, the title track "Psychomodo". It was released in mid-May 1974, but was quickly withdrawn in the UK as "Judy Teen" continued to climb the charts. It was given a full release in Europe and entered the charts in Belgium. When it was released in June, The Psychomodo proved to be the band's breakthrough in the UK Albums Chart. It reached its peak at number 8 on 14 September 1974, by which time Cockney Rebel had split up. In late July 1974, EMI released "Mr. Soft" as the album's second single. It was a chart success, reaching number 8 in the UK Singles Chart. Harley had to form two impromptu line-ups of Cockney Rebel in order to perform the song on Top of the Pops.

EMI did not release The Psychomodo in the US until January 1975 (under the new band name, Steve Harley & Cockney Rebel), with "Tumbling Down" also being issued there as a promotional single. Harley was frustrated by the length of time it took to release the album in the US and told Rock Scene in 1975, "There was over six months lag for Psychomodo. I don't know exactly why. There's no excuse for that really. Maybe someone didn't have faith in us over here until now."

The album received its first CD release by EMI in 1990. It included two bonus tracks, Harley's 1974 debut solo single "Big Big Deal", and the B-side of the "Psychomodo" and "Mr. Soft" singles, "Such a Dream". In 2001, BGO Records reissued the album in the UK, but without any bonus tracks.

In 2012, the album was included in its entirety on the remastered four-disc box-set anthology compilation album Cavaliers: An Anthology 1973–1974. The release also included previously unreleased 'early versions' of many of the debut album tracks, as well as B-sides and live tracks from the period. On 24 November 2012, Steve Harley & Cockney Rebel, supported by an orchestra and chamber choir, performed The Human Menagerie and The Psychomodo albums in their entirety live at the Birmingham Symphony Hall. The performance was released in 2013 as CD and DVD releases under the title Birmingham (Live with Orchestra & Choir). The same show was performed live four more times in 2014 at Manchester's Bridgewater Hall, Sage Gateshead, London's Royal Albert Hall, and again at the Birmingham Symphony Hall.

== Critical reception ==
Professional ratings
Review scores
Source	Rating
Rolling Stone (German edition)	4/5 stars
Veronica Magazine	3.25/5 stars

Upon its release, Jeff Ward of Melody Maker noted that The Psychomodo is "intrepid manic music, lashed by an obsessive creative drive and wonderfully defiant of accepted forms". He added, "Packed with intrigue, it's the kind of thing that should stop people looking at rock through a rearview mirror. Cockney Rebel are of today, and of the future". A reviewer for the South Wales Argus stated that the "memorable album" is "reminiscent of Bowie, but with a strong stamp of originality" and is "likely to strengthen the band's already flourishing reputation". David Naylor of the Western Daily Press, who had been highly critical of The Human Menagerie, was won over by the album. He noted how Harley's "surrealistic, almost pseud" lyrics have a "Dylan ring to them", providing "rich images" and "outstanding mood variations, swinging from despair to humour in seconds". He also praised the "rich, refined, almost orchestral music that backs Harley", played by "four expert musicians".

Ian Morton-Smith of the Middlesex Chronicle praised the album for being "totally original" and stated that Harley's "fascinating voice does a lot to give Rebel their very individual sound". He continued, "Rebel rely heavily on a semi-reggae pulse to their music, which, in conjunction with some nice keyboard work, is very easy on the ear. They won't be to everybody's taste, but [this] LP makes a great change from all the run-of-the-mill rubbish." A reviewer for the Birmingham Evening Mail stated, "Harley uses tricks learned from listening to David Bowie and Bryan Ferry, but the end result is something quite original, and the songs are very much his own." Geoff Thompson of the Bracknell Times called the album a "superb success", with a "splendid" side one and a side two that "must rank as brilliance at its very best". Colin Cross, writing for the Eastern Evening News, praised it as a "great" LP with a mixture of "moody" and "high class" pop. He added that Harley was "fast becoming a singer of note and also a songwriter supreme".

Bob Scallon of the Acton Gazette wrote, "On the plus side, Harley is gifted with an unusual and distinctive voice, and is a very original songwriter. On the minus side, however, I don't think he has quite licked the band into shape yet and the demanding arrangements on several of the tracks of The Psychomodo sometimes seem a bit beyond them musically. They make all the right noises, but the vital spark is somehow missing. I still feel the very best of Rebel is yet to come." Peter Trollope of the Liverpool Echo believed it to be a "very interesting album", but added that he "still can't decide whether I like it or loathe it". He continued, "The production is excellent and the music is just as good, but there is something lacking which is hard to define. Some of the musical ideas are original but the lyrics come over in part as a little too contrived for my liking." Charles Shaar Murray of the NME was largely negative, stating that the majority of the album is "disposable". He noted that "Mr Soft" "succeeds primarily on the strength of the arrangement", but felt it was "Ritz" that "justifies the existence of the album". He concluded, "One good track don't make a star, but Harley has proved that he does have something going." Tony Wilson of the Evening Herald was negative in his review, calling Cockney Rebel's music "post-Bowie pretentious", with Harley "manag[ing] to consistently create overlong, third-rate articles devoid of much melody, and lyrically sound as though he's been digging down in Bowie's dustbin for cast-off lyrics". He was also critical of Harley's "plaintive whine passed off for singing" and added that the "occasional flashes of musical idea and inventiveness are few and far between", with "only the mechanics of the recording studio sav[ing] the album from total disaster".

In the US, Cash Box commented, "Cockney Rebel are even more explosive on their second LP than they were on the first. The band goes far afield occasionally, but only in an attempt to refine and define their sound to a universal pitch. The record moves with intensity and purpose and in every way lives up to the band's reputation as a great live act."

=== Retrospective reviews ===
Professional ratings
Review scores
Source	Rating
AllMusic	4.5/5 stars
Select	1/5 medals

Dave Thompson of AllMusic retrospectively said, "If The Human Menagerie was a journey into the bowels of decadent cabaret, The Psychomodo is like a trip to the circus. Except the clowns were more sickly perverted than clowns normally are, and the fun house was filled with rattlesnakes and spiders. Such twists on innocent childhood imagery have transfixed authors from Ray Bradbury to Stephen King, but Steve Harley and Cockney Rebel were the first band to set that same dread to music, and the only ones to make it work." In a 2012 review of Cavaliers: An Anthology 1973-1974, Uncut stated, "The Psychomodo is anything but effete. 'Ritz' and 'Cavaliers' fathom its For Your Pleasure-era Roxy Music depths, and Harley signs off in style on 'Tumbling Down'."

== Track listing ==
All songs written and composed by Steve Harley.

No.	Title	Length
1.	"Sweet Dreams"	2:05
2.	"Psychomodo"	4:03
3.	"Mr. Soft"	3:17
4.	"Singular Band"	2:59
5.	"Ritz"	7:14
6.	"Cavaliers"	8:34
7.	"Bed in the Corner"	3:32
8.	"Sling It!"	2:42
9.	"Tumbling Down"	5:48

1990 EMI CD bonus tracks
No.	Title	Length
10.	"Big Big Deal"	4:33
11.	"Such a Dream"	5:07

== Personnel ==
Cockney Rebel

- Steve Harley – vocals
- Jean-Paul Crocker – electric violin, guitar
- Milton Reame-James – keyboards
- Paul Jeffreys – Fender bass
- Stuart Elliott – drums, percussion

Production

- Steve Harley, Alan Parsons – producers
- Peter Flanagan – engineer (Morgan Studios)
- Richard Dodd – engineer (Nova Sound)
- Geoff Emerick – engineer (AIR Studios)
- John Middleton – engineer (AIR Studios)
- Andrew Powell – orchestral and brass arrangements
- Chris Blair – mastering

Sleeve

- Mick Rock – photography, sleeve design, etc.

== Charts ==
Chart (1974)	Peak position
Finnish Albums (Suomen virallinen lista)	29
UK Albums Chart	8

== Certifications ==
Region	Certification	Certified units/sales
United Kingdom (BPI)	Gold	100,000^{^}
^{^} Shipments figures based on certification alone.
