= Psychomodo =

1974 song by Cockney Rebel

Single by Cockney Rebel

from the album The Psychomodo
- B-side: "Such a Dream"
- Released: 17 May 1974
- Genre: Rock
- Length: 4:03
- Label: EMI
- Songwriter: Steve Harley
- Producers: Steve Harley; Alan Parsons

Cockney Rebel singles chronology
| "Hideaway" (1974) | "Psychomodo" (1974) | "Mr. Soft" (1974) |

"Psychomodo" is a song by the British rock band Cockney Rebel, fronted by Steve Harley. It was released in 1974 as the lead single from their second studio album The Psychomodo. "Psychomodo" was written by Harley, and produced by Harley and Alan Parsons.

== Background ==
"Psychomodo" was recorded during sessions for The Psychomodo in February–March 1974. The song was inspired by the album's overall theme which was described by Harley in 1974 as "very much a concept: psychomodal – stream of consciousness". On The Psychomodo, the song is preceded by the opening track "Sweet Dreams", which segues into "Psychomodo".

== Release ==
EMI originally intended to release "Psychomodo" as a single in the UK, with a release date of 17 May 1974. Although copies were pressed, EMI cancelled the single's release when the band's preceding single "Judy Teen", which was released in March 1974, began to climb the UK Singles Chart. It made its debut on 11 May and reached its peak at number 5 on 22 June.

"Psychomodo" still received a single release in certain Europe countries (Belgium, France and the Netherlands) and became a hit in Belgium in June–July 1974. The B-side, "Such a Dream", was written by Harley, and produced by Harley and Parsons. It was initially exclusive to the single, but then appeared as the B-side to the band's following single "Mr. Soft". "Such a Dream" has also appeared as a bonus track on EMI's 1990 CD release of The Psychomodo, and on the 2012 compilation Cavaliers: An Anthology 1973-1974.

== Promotion ==
As a regular inclusion in the set-list, "Psychomodo" has been performed live by Steve Harley & Cockney Rebel on many occasions, and various live versions have been recorded for official releases. On 28 May 1974, Cockney Rebel performed it during a BBC session for John Peel, which was later released on the 1995 compilation Live at the BBC and Cavaliers: An Anthology 1973–1974. Other live versions have appeared on Face to Face (1977), The Come Back, All is Forgiven Tour: Live (1989) and Acoustic and Pure: Live (2003).

== Critical reception ==
On its release, the Belgian magazine Popshop was critical of the song for moving Cockney Rebel "in the rock direction". They added, "With songs like this Cockney Rebel could well become a one hit wonder." In a review of The Psychomodo, Record Mirror stated: "The great merit of Harley's insanity is that it's laid bare here for every lost blimp to indulge. 'Psychomodo': 'I've been losing my head, I've been losing my way, I've been losing my brain cells at a million a day, I'm so disillusioned, I'm on suicide street...' Harley cleans out his soul and wherever he's going, he's going to take a lot with him."

Donald A. Guarisco of AllMusic retrospectively reviewed the song, stating, "One of the highlights of Cockney Rebel was the wild lyrics of Steve Harley, who often fused serious ideas with dazzling wordplay along the lines of Marc Bolan. An interesting example of this approach is the title track from 1974's The Psychomodo". He described the "dense, wordy" lyrics as being "like a trip through the mind of a mentally frazzled rock star" and noted the "quick-paced verses of twisty melodic frills" and the "attention-getting chorus". In a retrospective review of The Psychomodo, Dave Thompson of AllMusic stated, "Reversing the nature of The Human Menagerie, the crucial songs here are not those extended epics. Rather, it is the paranoid vignette of 'Sweet Dreams,' the panicked brainstorm of the title track; and the stuttering, chopping, hysterical nightmare of 'Such a Dream'."

== Cover versions ==
In 1980, the post-punk band Scars recorded a version of the song as the B-side to their single "Love Song", which was released on the PRE/Charisma label in May 1980.

== Track listing ==
7-inch single

1. "Psychomodo" – 4:03
2. "Such a Dream" – 5:03

== Personnel ==
Cockney Rebel

- Steve Harley – vocals
- Jean-Paul Crocker – electric violin, guitar
- Milton Reame-James – keyboards
- Paul Jeffreys – Fender bass
- Stuart Elliott – drums, percussion

Production

- Steve Harley – producer
- Alan Parsons – producer
- Chris Blair – mastering

== Charts ==
| Chart (1974) | Peak position |
|---|---|
| Belgium (Ultratop 50 Flanders) | 28 |
| Belgium (Ultratop 50 Wallonia) | 42 |
