= Mr. Soft =

1974 song by Cockney Rebel

- German cover of "Mr. Soft"

Single by Cockney Rebel

from the album The Psychomodo
- B-side: "Such a Dream"
- Released: 26 July 1974
- Genre: Glam rock; psychedelic pop
- Length: 3:17
- Label: EMI
- Songwriter: Steve Harley
- Producers: Steve Harley; Alan Parsons

Cockney Rebel singles chronology
| "Psychomodo" (1974) | "Mr. Soft" (1974) | "Big Big Deal" (1974) |

Alternative Cover
- 1988 UK re-issue

Official audio
- Mr. Soft (2012 Remaster) on YouTube

"Mr. Soft" is a song by the British rock band Cockney Rebel, fronted by Steve Harley, which was released in 1974 as the second single from their second studio album The Psychomodo. The song was written by Harley, and produced by Harley and Alan Parsons. "Mr. Soft" peaked at number 8 in the UK Singles Chart.

== Background ==
"Mr. Soft" was Cockney Rebel's second hit in the UK, following the top 5 success of "Judy Teen" earlier in the year. By the time "Judy Teen" began climbing the UK charts in May 1974, the band had completed recording their second album The Psychomodo and had embarked on a UK tour. The title track, "Psychomodo", was issued as the album's lead single in May, but it was quickly withdrawn as "Judy Teen" continued to climb the charts. The Psychomodo was released in June and once "Judy Teen" dropped out of the UK charts in July, "Mr. Soft" was released as the follow-up. It proved to be another success, peaking at number 8 and remaining in the charts for nine weeks.

The decision to release "Mr. Soft" as the band's next single was made in June, with Harley considering the song to be "a moderate progression from Judy Teen". By the time "Mr. Soft" was released in July, Cockney Rebel had disbanded owing to internal tensions and disagreements. Harley would form a new line-up as 'Steve Harley & Cockney Rebel' later in the year.

The backing vocals on "Mr. Soft" were performed by the Mike Sammes Singers, who also contributed vocals on other tracks on The Psychomodo. In 2012, Harley recalled, "The Mike Sammes Singers, practically resident on the BBC Light Programme, came in to sing backing vocals, all those "boom-boom-boom, boom"s and bassy "mmmmms"s on 'Mr Soft'." It was arranger Andrew Powell who suggested the Mike Sammes Singers after Harley expressed his ideas for the song's backing vocals. The keyboard solo references "Entrance of the Gladiators" by Julius Fucik.

=== Trebor Softmints adverts ===
Around 1987 the song was used in television adverts for Trebor Softmints and Softfruits. Both adverts used two lines of the song, with changed lyrics sung by a sound-alike Steve Harley. Initially the advert's producers had approached Harley with the idea of re-writing and re-recording the lines himself. Harley was uncomfortable at the idea of doing this, but gave permission for the producers to adapt the song themselves. The lyrics were re-written by film-maker Malcolm Green and sung by Phillip Pope, who attempted to replicate Harley's vocal style. Both adverts were directed by Len Fulford and produced by BFCS.

The use of the song in the adverts led EMI to re-release the song as 7-inch single in the UK on 7 March 1988 "due to popular demand", but it did not chart. Its release date was scheduled to coincide with Softmints' spring campaign, which ran nationally between March and the end of April 1988.

For the Softmints advert, the lyrics were rewritten accordingly: "Mr. Soft, won't you tell me why the world in which you're living is so strange? / Oh, Mr. Soft, how come everything around you is so soft and rearranged?" For the Softfruits advert, the lyrics were: "Mr. Soft, ain't it grand you can afford to go abroad just to unwind? / It's so hot, just you be careful that the sun don't turn you softer in the mind".

== Release ==
"Mr Soft" was released by EMI Records on 7-inch vinyl in the UK, Ireland, Belgium, Germany, Spain, Portugal, the Netherlands, Yugoslavia and Japan. The majority of versions of the single featured the B-side "Such a Dream", which was written by Harley, and produced by Harley and Parsons. It had previously appeared as B-side on the "Psychomodo" single, and was later included as a bonus track on the 1991 Japanese and 1992 UK CD reissues of The Psychomodo. For its release in Belgium and the Netherlands, "Crazy Raver", a track from Cockney Rebel's 1973 debut album The Human Menagerie, was used as the B-side, while the Yugoslavian release used "Judy Teen" as the B-side.

The 1988 EMI re-issue of "Mr. Soft" was released under the artist title of Steve Harley & Cockney Rebel. The B-side, "Mad, Mad Moonlight", was taken from their 1975 album The Best Years of Our Lives. The 2012 compilation Cavaliers: An Anthology 1973–1974 includes an alternate mix of "Mr. Soft".

== Promotion ==
The song was performed twice on the UK music show Top of the Pops. As Cockney Rebel had disbanded, Harley had to quickly form an impromptu band to perform on the show. For the 15 August performance, Harley appeared with original Cockney Rebel drummer Stuart Elliott, the new Cockney Rebel guitarist Jim Cregan and bassist George Ford, and Francis Monkman on keyboards. For the 22 August performance, Ford was replaced by Herbie Flowers and Monkman was replaced by B. A. Robertson. In the Netherlands, the new band's permanent line-up of Harley, Cregan, keyboardist Duncan Mackay, Ford and Elliott performed the song on AVRO TV show TopPop. In 1983, Harley performed a slower version of the song on the Channel 4 show Gastank, where he was backed by the house band.

"Mr. Soft" has been a constant inclusion in the set-list of Harley and the band's concerts, and various live versions have been recorded for official releases. On 28 May 1974, the original line-up performed the song during a BBC session for John Peel, which was later included on the 1995 compilation Live at the BBC and Cavaliers: An Anthology 1973–1974. On 14 April 1975, Steve Harley & Cockney Rebel performed the song as part of their set at the Hammersmith Odeon, London, which was filmed and released as the film Between the Lines. Further live versions have appeared on Face to Face: A Live Recording (1977), Live from London (1985), The Come Back, All is Forgiven Tour: Live (1989), Stripped to the Bare Bones (1999), Acoustic and Pure: Live (2003), Anytime! (A Live Set) (2004), Live at the Isle of Wight Festival (2005) and Birmingham (Live with Orchestra & Choir) (2013).

== Critical reception ==
Upon its release, Deborah Thomas of Daily Mirror commented, "Steve Harley and his band have a rough brush with a violin and a touch of the cossacks as they wend their way through a creepy camper." Peter Jones of Record & Radio Mirror described the song to be "what you might term a novelty record with strong hook 'ooola' feelings". He also made comparisons to James Darren's "Goodbye Cruel World". Stephen Weddle of the Birmingham Evening Mail commented on how Harley's "stylised voice", the "excellent violin" and the "Russian style chorus" "blend beautifully". He added, "Another good reason why we should lament this band's rapid split." In a review of The Psychomodo, Charles Shaar Murray of the NME felt that most of the album was "disposable", but considered "Mr. Soft" to "succeed primarily on the strength of the arrangement", which he described as "a kind of modified Brechtian cabaret vamp of the kind that Bowie tackled on 'Time'". He added, "What makes this one work is a '50s doo-wop backing vocal which maintains interest for most of the track."

In a review of the 1988 reissue, Jerry Smith of Music Week considered it a "well-deserved reissue" of a "truly classic hit from 1974" and added, "It's only sad that it should take an advert to generate interest for one of the most influential artists of the Seventies." Chris Roberts of Melody Maker described it as "surprisingly entertaining", with Harley "display[ing] wit, daffiness, and stroodle on the noodle". Pete Paisley of Record Mirror noted the "nigglingly nasty camp fairground feel that pretty well sums up all the lurid over-theatricality of much early Seventies pop". He continued, "The sort of record that will either conjure up feelings of wincing horror or elated nostalgia." Jim Whiteford of the Dundee Evening Telegraph believed it was "sure to make the top 40 once again, with a little radio attention". Mervin Straughan of the Sunderland Echo called it a "70s classic [which] is far superior to much of the material around today", with Harley "bounc[ing] along like an Indian Rubber Man with his elasticated, almost surreal vocals".

Carol Clerk of Classic Rock, in a 2006 review of The Cockney Rebel – A Steve Harley Anthology, described the song as "exquisitely crafted and arranged, and determinedly eccentric to boot". Chris Roberts of Uncut wrote, "Harley's band slid perfectly into the post-Ziggy/Roxy slipstream, all mannered English vocals, florid lyrics and sexual-theatrical rock. Tricksy hits like 'Judy Teen' and 'Mr Soft' (riddled with inventive sonic punctuation, also violins) displayed arch wit."

== Legacy ==
The English alternative rock band Elbow called themselves "Mr Soft" during the early 1990s. Speaking to the Birmingham Post in 2013, Harley said, "I kind of secretly hear and imagine the possibility that I might be an influence, and my wife will see it, but, I don't want to go there and find out that they've never heard of me! I don't need that kudos. I'm a great fatalist. Elbow's first group name was Mr Soft, and I've spoken quite a lot to Guy Garvey about it. It's nice. But mostly you don't want to think about it."

In their 1994 hit "Shakermaker", the English rock band Oasis referenced "Mr. Soft" with the line "I've been driving in my car with my friend Mr. Soft". In a 2004 survey by Phones 4u listing the UK's top ten most recognisable jingles, "Mr. Soft" ranked at number 7.

== Track listing ==
7-inch single

1. "Mr. Soft" – 3:17
2. "Such a Dream" – 5:04

7-inch single (Belgium and Netherlands release)

1. "Mr. Soft" – 3:17
2. "Crazy Raver" – 3:43

7-inch single (Yugoslavia release)

1. "Mr. Soft" – 3:17
2. "Judy Teen" – 3:45

7-inch Single (1988 UK re-issue)

1. "Mr. Soft" – 3:17
2. "Mad, Mad Moonlight" – 5:37

== Personnel ==
Cockney Rebel

- Steve Harley – vocals
- Jean-Paul Crocker – electric violin, guitar
- Paul Jeffreys – Fender bass
- Milton Reame-James – keyboards
- Stuart Elliott – drums, percussion

Additional musicians

- Mike Sammes Singers – backing vocals

Producer

- Steve Harley, Alan Parsons – producers

== Charts ==
| Chart (1974) | Peak position |
|---|---|
| Belgium (Ultratop 50 Wallonia) | 43 |
| Ireland (IRMA) | 16 |
| UK Singles (Official Charts) | 8 |
