= Sebastian (song) =

1973 song by Cockney Rebel

Single by Cockney Rebel

from the album The Human Menagerie
- B-side: "Rock and Roll Parade"
- Released: 31 August 1973
- Genre: Glam rock, baroque pop
- Length: 3:54 (7" version); 6:59 (album version)
- Label: EMI
- Songwriter: Steve Harley
- Producer: Neil Harrison

Cockney Rebel singles chronology
| "Sebastian" (1973) | "Judy Teen" (1974) |

Alternative Cover
- German cover of "Sebastian"

"Sebastian" is a song by the British rock band Cockney Rebel, fronted by Steve Harley. It was released as the band's debut single in 1973 from their album The Human Menagerie. The song was written by Harley and produced by Neil Harrison.

== Background ==
"Sebastian" was written and first performed by Harley during his days of busking in the early 1970s, before Cockney Rebel were formed in late 1972. Having trained as a journalist for three years, Harley embarked on his musical career through open mic performances within London folk clubs in 1971–72, and began busking in London in 1972. Speaking to the Daily Express in 2007, Harley recalled, "I started busking in the early 70's, which gave me a platform to experiment on the public with my songs. I had one called 'Sebastian', which was six minutes of gothic poetry! I got absolutely no money."

Cockney Rebel recorded their debut album The Human Menagerie, including "Sebastian", at Air Studios, London, in the summer of 1973, after the band signed a deal with EMI Records. With Neil Harrison as producer, "Sebastian" was recorded with a 50-plus piece orchestra and choir alongside the band, with orchestral arrangements by Andrew Powell.

Since its release, "Sebastian" has gained reputation over the years as one of Harley's greatest songs and has consistently been included in the set-lists of both the band's and Harley's solo concerts, usually as the penultimate song of a given concert, before "Make Me Smile (Come Up and See Me)". While fans have long debated the true meaning of the song (with suggestions of influence ranging from Oscar Wilde to St. Sebastian), Harley never definitively revealed it during his lifetime. He did, however, expand on the song's meaning and inspiration in a couple of interviews:

In 2008, Harley spoke about the song and its lyrics in a feature for the Netherlands programme Top 2000,

"It's poetry. It means what you want it to mean. 'Sebastian' is the conduit, the tubes through which I took myself on that journey to write the story. I can't say for sure, but I wouldn't have been far away from tripping when I wrote 'Sebastian'. LSD, certainly, created so many incidents in your life, so many images, so much madness and mayhem, as well as great tranquility if you were lucky. I can't define its meaning. It's like most poetry, it's a lovely word."

In 2004, he said of the song and its recording,

"'Sebastian' is possibly a sort of Gothic love song, possibly not: I'm not really sure to be honest. But I do know that it has just three chords and a couple of riffs and that I had been busking it in the London subways and on Portobello Road for many months before EMI offered the lads and me, the first Cockney Rebel, a recording contract. Andrew Powell's enormous and wild arrangement for the classical bods and the choir turned the song into something different, of course."

In a 1974 interview, Cockney Rebel's violinist Jean-Paul Crocker was critical of the orchestra used on "Sebastian" and other tracks on The Human Menagerie. He said, "I've only played violin for about three years, but I was quite a bit better than a lot of those blokes, and they've been playing donkeys years. They had the technical ability, but they had no feel. With 'Sebastian' they just couldn't get it on. The drums were right to the second all the way through, but when they put the strings and brass on, it went all over the place."

In 1983, Harley re-recorded the song with Mike Batt as producer. This version was released on the German 12-inch release of the single "Ballerina (Prima Donna)". In the UK, the 12-inch release was classed as "Sebastian" combined with (c/w) "Ballerina". A previously unreleased early version of "Sebastian" appeared on Cavaliers: An Anthology 1973–1974 in 2012.

== Release ==
"Sebastian" was released as the band's debut single in August 1973, preceding The Human Menagerie, which followed in November. According to the Evening Sentinel, it had sold just over 4,000 copies in the UK by 20 October 1973. Although it ultimately failed to enter the UK Singles Chart, even with a second reissue in November 1973, the song became a big hit in continental Europe, including reaching the top spot on the Belgian Ultratop 50 Wallonia chart. In a 2014 interview with the Sunday Express, Harley said of the song's European success, "It happened so quickly. I didn't pay many dues to be honest. That's what the New Musical Express held against me at the time."

The failure of "Sebastian" and The Human Menagerie in the UK led EMI to feel that Harley had yet to record a potential hit single. In response, he went away and re-worked one of his unrecorded songs called "Judy Teen", which became a number five hit for the band in June 1974. Before its release, EMI agreed to hold the song back at the beginning of 1974 and re-issue "Sebastian" on 18 January for the third time as a UK single. This was at the band's insistence, but it still did not enter the charts.

"Sebastian" was released by EMI Records on 7-inch vinyl in the UK, Belgium, France, Germany, the Netherlands, Portugal, Italy, Japan, Australia and Mexico. In the US, EMI released "Sebastian" as a promotional only single. For its release as a single, the seven minute song was shortened down to make its length more friendly for radio. Harley was never entirely happy about having the song cut down and he described the editing of the track as "sacrilege" to Music Scene in 1974. The B-side, "Rock and Roll Parade", was written by Harley and produced by Harrison. It was exclusive to the single, but later appeared as a bonus track on the 2004 CD re-issue of The Human Menagerie, and also on the 2012 EMI box-set compilation Cavaliers: An Anthology 1973-1974.

== Live performances ==
Since its release, "Sebastian" has been a consistent inclusion in Harley and the band's concerts, and various live versions have been recorded for official releases. On 22 January 1974, the band performed it for a BBC 'Live in Concert' session, which was later released on the 1995 compilation Live at the BBC and Cavaliers: An Anthology 1973–1974. On 14 April 1975, Steve Harley & Cockney Rebel performed the song as part of their set at the Hammersmith Odeon, London, which was filmed and released as the film Between the Lines. The same recording appeared as the B-side to the band's 1975 UK hit single "Mr. Raffles (Man, It Was Mean)", and as a bonus track on the first CD release of The Best Years of Our Lives in 1991. Further live versions have been included on Face to Face: A Live Recording (1977), Live from London (1985), The Come Back, All is Forgiven Tour: Live (1989), Stripped to the Bare Bones (1999), Anytime! (A Live Set) (2004), Live at the Isle of Wight Festival (2005) and Birmingham (Live with Orchestra & Choir) (2013).

== Critical reception ==
On its first release, the NME described the song as a "wonderful record", adding, "It's a classically influenced ballad with the upper lead vocals placed, delicately, in the middle of the finest string and bass arrangement I've heard since the Titanic sank. The lyrics are a little contrived... but just you wait for the grand choral work." Melody Maker noted, "The Rebel are a very interesting band indeed, and this is an adventurous and unusual performance." Record Mirror commented on the song's "concert-classical type of string sounds", "strained voice", "beautiful mood", "excellent lyrics" and "first-class production".

In a review of the song's second 1973 release, Deborah Thomas of Daily Mirror described the song as "an eerie slice of vicious moodiness with heavy orchestral backing and choir". She added, "Watch out for them, they're going to be big." Chris Welch of Melody Maker described it as an "unusual and powerful ballad", adding, "They don't look or sound like Cockneys – more like Venusians." In a review of the 1974 reissue, The Staffordshire Weekly Sentinel noted Harley's "haunting lyrics" and the "particularly doom-laden arrangement". The Evening News and Star said of the "dirge-like tune": "Harley hasn't exactly got a pleasant voice, but the whole thing, from the quiet harpsichord and piano accompaniment to the occasionally deranged passages from Harley, works very well."

In a 2004 review of The Human Menagerie, Geoff Barton of Classic Rock commented how the album "builds insidiously until the arrival of the fifth track, the immense and immortal 'Sebastian'". Carol Clerk of Classic Rock said in a review of the 2006 release The Cockney Rebel – A Steve Harley Anthology that "Sebastian" was a "brave first single with its choral and orchestral dramas". Chris Roberts of Uncut described the song as a "quite wonderful seven-minute epic with the unabashed self-importance of early Genesis".

In a retrospective review of The Human Menagerie, Dave Thompson of AllMusic felt that both the labyrinthine "Sebastian" and loquacious "Death Trip" "possess confidence, arrogance, and a doomed, decadent madness which astounds". Donald A. Guarisco of AllMusic, in a review of the 1975 compilation A Closer Look, highlighted "Sebastian" as one of the compilation's "most impressive epics". He described the song as a "slowly building ballad that adds layers of orchestration and choral vocals as it lays out a gothic tale of a romantic obsession that gives way to insanity".

In 2005, Peter Hook of New Order chose six of his top tracks for The Metro, which included "Sebastian". He said, "It's the first song that made me realise that there's more to music than pop. It wasn't throwaway. It builds up and down over [seven] minutes. Like 'Bohemian Rhapsody', there's loads of different bits that go through it. The beauty of it is that you can listen to it over and over again and not get fed up with it." In a "Soundtrack of My Life" feature for the NME in 2015, Hook chose "Sebastian" as the "first song I fell in love with".

== Track listing ==
7-inch single

1. "Sebastian" – 4:03
2. "Rock and Roll Parade" – 2:55

7-inch single (Mexican release)

1. "Sebastian" – 4:03
2. "Death Trip" – 9:54

7-inch single (US promo)

1. "Sebastian" (Mono) – 3:36
2. "Sebastian" (Stereo) – 3:36

== Cover versions ==
- In 1975, Dutch singer Patricia Paay recorded a version of "Sebastian" for her album Beam of Light, which was titled after a line in the song. Harley produced the entire album and contributed a further song, "Understand", which was also recorded by Steve Harley & Cockney Rebel for Timeless Flight (1976). Paay is the sister of Yvonne Keeley, who was Harley's backing vocalist and girlfriend of the time.
- In 1982, Greek singer and musician Vasilis Papakonstantinou recorded a cover of "Sebastian" for his album Φοβάμαι (I am scared).
- In 1987, British band Far Corporation recorded a version of the song, which was released by Arista as a single in August that year. Harley approved of the version and agreed to make an appearance in the song's music video. The video, which was directed by Rudi Dolezal and Hannes Rossacher, was shot at Ireland. On 29 August, the band appeared on the German TV show Na Siehste! to promote the single, which featured Harley making an appearance as the keyboardist.

== Personnel ==
Cockney Rebel

- Steve Harley – vocals
- Jean-Paul Crocker – electric violin, guitar
- Paul Jeffreys – Fender bass
- Milton Reame-James – keyboards
- Stuart Elliott – drums, percussion

Production

- Neil Harrison – producer
- Geoff Emerick – engineer
- Andrew Powell – orchestral arrangement

== Charts ==
| Chart (1973–74) | Peak position |
|---|---|
| Belgium (Ultratop 50 Flanders) | 2 |
| Belgium (Ultratop 50 Wallonia) | 1 |
| Netherlands (Dutch Top 40) | 2 |
| Netherlands (Single Top 100) | 2 |
| West Germany (GfK) | 30 |
