= The Human Menagerie =

Studio album by Cockney Rebel
- Released: November 1973
- Recorded: June–July 1973
- Studios: Air Studios, London
- Genres: Glam rock, dark cabaret
- Length: 44:18
- Label: EMI
- Producer: Neil Harrison

Cockney Rebel chronology
The Human Menagerie (1973)	The Psychomodo (1974)

Singles from The Human Menagerie
- 1. "Sebastian" Released: 31 August 1973; 2. "Hideaway" Released: 1974 (Denmark only)

The Human Menagerie is the debut studio album by Cockney Rebel, released by EMI in November 1973. It was produced by Neil Harrison.

== Background ==
After training as a journalist for three years, Steve Harley embarked on a musical career, which began with "floor spots" in London folk clubs in 1971. He also had a brief spell as rhythm guitarist and co-singer in the folk band Odin, where he met future Cockney Rebel violinist Jean-Paul Crocker. It was during this time that Harley began writing his own songs, including those which were recorded for The Human Menagerie. Most were penned while Harley was on the dole after leaving his career in journalism. He began busking with his songs in London in 1972, including at Hyde Park Corner, Marble Arch, Leicester Square and Covent Garden. The busking allowed Harley to test his songs on an audience and to supplement his income from benefits.

Harley's time in Odin made him realise he was not suited to the folk scene and, as a vehicle for his own songs, he decided to form his own band, Cockney Rebel, in 1972. With Crocker on violin, the pair advertised for and auditioned drummer Stuart Elliott, bassist Paul Jeffreys, and guitarist Nick Jones. One of the band's first gigs was at the Roundhouse in Chalk Farm, London, on 23 July 1972 supporting the Jeff Beck Group. Jones was soon replaced by Pete Newnham, but Harley subsequently felt the band did not need an electric guitar, particularly after the addition of keyboardist Milton Reame-James. Therefore, the band settled on the combination of Crocker's electric violin and the Fender Rhodes piano of Reame-James.

During 1972, representatives of the band began sending demo tapes to various labels. Mickie Most discovered the band at London's Speakeasy Club and offered them their first contract with his RAK Publishing. In turn, this drew the attention of the A&R personnel at EMI Records, who then offered the band a three album contract in late 1972. They signed to EMI after having only played five gigs together.

== Recording ==
Cockney Rebel recorded their debut album in June and July 1973 at Air Studios in London, which at the time was located in Oxford Street above a department store. EMI hired their staff producer and A&R man Neil Harrison as the album's producer and Geoff Emerick as the engineer. In 2012, Harley recalled of his experience recording the album, "The news that our engineer would be the nigh-immortal Geoff Emerick brought wide-eyed excitement to those of us who knew details of Beatles' albums' sleeve notes. Neil Harrison was himself fearless as he allowed my imagination to run loose."

It was at Harrison's suggestion that two tracks, "Sebastian" and "Death Trip", should feature a large symphony orchestra and choir. Harley agreed, and Harrison was then successful in obtaining a bigger budget from EMI to accommodate the use of a 50-piece orchestra. Andrew Powell was hired to compose and take charge of the orchestral arrangements. In 2004, Harley recalled,

"In the backyard of a Chelsea bistro, Neil Harrison and I were sharing a pot of coffee when he told me he would like to record an orchestra and choir onto 'Sebastian' and 'Death Trip'. We were about three-parts through [the album], so Neil, my producer, must have known his announcement that afternoon would bowl the young Steve over. And it did. But seeing them in there, fifty-plus classical musicians, mostly old enough to be my dad, was a real shocker. We were young and full of dangerous ideas and adventure; ready to experiment without consideration for the consequences or cost. And Joop Visser, EMI's head of A&R and the man who discovered us, was a consistently kind ally to Neil and myself; otherwise there would have been no orchestra or choir!"

Harley added in 2012, "Such a budget for a new signing is pretty close to unthinkable today. I'm still not sure how Neil persuaded the money-men to sign such crazy big cheques, but his nous and his charm helped turn those big tracks into epics and I'll forever be in his debt for that."

Shortly after its release, Cockney Rebel expressed some criticism towards the album. In a 1974 interview with Melody Maker, Harley called it "flat" and one that "talks a lot and says nothing". He told the NME that same year, "That album was wishy-washy... I knew that the day I came out of the studio, but for Chrissakes I wasn't going to come out and actually say that, 'cause it was my life's blood and I wanted it to sell." Speaking to Music Scene in June 1974, Elliott felt the band were "too inexperienced" when they recorded the album. Crocker was critical of the album's production and stated, "I didn't like the first album at all. A couple of tracks on it were okay, but on the rest of it the production lets us down badly. The band was struggling to get along with the producer all the time and we just didn't seem to get anywhere. So in the end we turned out an album that everybody liked, but which the band didn't. There was nothing wrong with it musically, it's just that the ideas that were there weren't coming out properly. It was very light and sterile, and a bit frigid." Crocker expressed the view that the band wanted the album to be "heavier than it was" and added that instead they "sounded like a bleedin' folk group most of the time". He also complained about the orchestra used on some of the tracks, "The orchestra we used mucked it up as well. I've only played violin for about three years, but I was quite a bit better than a lot of those blokes, and they've been playing donkeys years. They had the technical ability, but they had no feel."

== Song information ==
"I remember where the songs came from. They came from a young man's dream, where the blending of musical literature and mad, formless imaginings, could hang out together at the same folk club and present him with an entire raison d'etre."

— Steve Harley recalling the songs that formed The Human Menagerie and The Psychomodo albums in 2013.

Before he formed Cockney Rebel, Harley would supplement his dole money by busking and cleaning floors. He was inspired to write "What Ruthy Said" after polishing a parquet floor for a famous model. Harley commented in 2004, "She wore grey and looked quite severe and beautiful as the smart set of pre-war Germany would have looked, and I got 'What Ruthy Said' from that day." "Mirror Freak" was written about Marc Bolan. Harley and Bolan later became good friends; their first meeting saw Bolan ask Harley if "Mirror Freak" was about him. Harley commented in 2004, "He was Narcissus personified and would have been looking everywhere for signs of his impact and influence."

"Death Trip" has been described by Harley as "a more complicated piece" than "Sebastian". He originally intended the preceding minute-long track "Chameleon" to be part of the song, but both Harley and Harrison later decided it worked best as a preface to "Death Trip". Both songs were inspired after Harley attended the inquest of a friend, who died of a heroin overdose.

== Release ==
The Human Menagerie was released by EMI in the UK and Europe in November 1973. Preceding the album was the band's debut single "Sebastian", which was released in August 1973. Despite achieving chart success in continental Europe, the song did not enter the UK Singles Chart. When The Human Menagerie was released, it suffered a similar fate in the UK, but has gone on to achieve critical acclaim and cult status. In 1974, "Hideaway" was released as the second single from The Human Menagerie, but only in Denmark.

The album received its first CD release by EMI in 1990. It included two bonus tracks, the 1974 non-album single "Judy Teen", and the B-side of "Sebastian", "Rock and Roll Parade". In 2004, BGO Records reissued the album in the UK with the same bonus tracks. On 28 September 2015, a vinyl reissue was released across Europe by Music on Vinyl.

In 2012, the album was included in its entirety on the remastered four-disc box-set anthology compilation album Cavaliers: An Anthology 1973–1974. The release also included previously unreleased 'early versions' of many of the debut album tracks, as well as B-sides and live tracks from the period. On 24 November 2012, Steve Harley & Cockney Rebel, supported by an orchestra and chamber choir, performed The Human Menagerie and The Psychomodo albums in their entirety live at the Birmingham Symphony Hall. The performance was released in 2013 as CD and DVD releases under the title Birmingham (Live with Orchestra & Choir). The same show was performed live four more times in 2014 at Manchester's Bridgewater Hall, Sage Gateshead, London's Royal Albert Hall, and again at the Birmingham Symphony Hall.

== Critical reception ==
Upon its release, Geoff Thompson of the Bracknell Times remarked that Cockney Rebel had "achieved a masterpiece, something that many groups strive years to achieve". He continued, "Not only have the band obviously taken a lot of time and careful thought over the recording, but the musicianship and production are of the highest calibre. This is a record of aggression, tranquility, beauty and ugliness. It's marvellous!" A reviewer for the Leicester Chronicle called Harley a "talented songwriter" and noted the album's "superb production" and "effective use of powerful Stravinsky-style orchestration". Gerald Radcliffe of the Huddersfield Daily Examiner gave a mixed review, stating that the "musicianship, lyrics and vocal presentation appear to be almost uniformly superb, as do most of the melodies and much of the production". He did, however, believe that rather than "gelling together into one equally superb whole, these various parts detract from each other, creating a rather uneven overall quality", as "either the backing is great or the lyrics knock you out of your seat, but seldom do both click together". He concluded, "The presentation of many of the tracks is along the sardonic, mocking lines of Roxy Music and Mott the Hoople, but Cockney Rebel have a confidence, freshness and humour of their own, and I am pretty certain that they will 'get everything together' next time round."

Dave Lewis of the Acton Gazette considered the album to have "some genuinely original and exciting ideas". He wrote, "The music is an extension of the fag-glam rock cliché, but with a more musical and slicker sheen to it. Harley's voice is nothing to shout about, but the flat, almost bored tone gives a strange haunting effect to the songs." Roy Carr of the NME felt that many of the songs "smack of a bygone era when rock became pretentious and punch-drunk from an over-abuse of psychedelics". He continued, "Such claptrap could be palmed off as being 'surreal' if it were not for the colourless and tasteless musical stew these raw dumplings have been dropped in. All The Human Menagerie proves is that Cockney Rebel are a hype and a rather effete one at that." James Belsey of the Bristol Evening Post expected "something better than this rather thin album" and believed that the band's sound "owes a lot to Crocker's violin playing, and he's by no means the best violinist in rock". David Naylor of the Western Daily Press called Cockney Rebel "more ponced-up clowns cashing in on this the last and worst period of rock" and added that they are "dreary and mumbling and trying too hard to be different".

In the US, Billboard praised the album as "very pleasant soft rock sparked by folky electric violin work and subtle percussion" and believed it could generate "strong FM play action". Cash Box commented, "A devastating brand of rock and some very clever arranging highlight this great debut LP. Featured on this LP are such fantastic tunes as 'Hideaway,' 'Mirror Freak,' 'Death Trip,' 'Sebastian,' and 'Crazy Raver,' each of which holds its own special magic." Bill Provick of the Canadian newspaper The Ottawa Citizen noted the album had "some rather interesting ideas, approaches and styles", but felt "they are all scattered throughout the never-changing mush of play-acting". He added, "The music has a multitude of low-key gimmicks but no real soul to hang them on. The David Bowie vocals seem programmed and have no edge. The instrumentation is cleverly diversified but comes out one dimensional and plastic."

=== Retrospective reviews ===
Professional ratings
Review scores
Source	Rating
AllMusic	4.5/5 stars
Classic Rock	5/5 stars
Mojo	1/5 stars
Record Collector	4/5 stars
Select	2/5 medals

Writing about the 2004 BGO re-issue of the album, Joe Matera for Record Collector said, "Cockney Rebel's debut has weathered well. Though Harley's compositions are peppered with the glam influences of his day, within its musical walls lie something closer to a dark cabaret that's laced with playful pop wit and subtle prog-folk tinges." Geoff Barton of Classic Rock concluded, "Cockney Rebel were a brand new thing in futuristic satin suits and twirly bow-ties. Harley's highly mannered, nasal, twanging voice was augmented by violin player Jean-Paul Crocker. A mass of quirky, unfathomable, psychotic lyrics added to the attraction. It's about time The Human Menagerie was recognised as a classic." Andrew Thomas of The Westmorland Gazette described the album as a "real mixture of light and dark". He noted songs such as "What Ruthy Said" and "Muriel the Actor" are "bright pop songs", whereas others like "Sebastian" and "Death Trip "are loaded with hidden depths, both musically and emotionally". Mojo stated, "Harley's fourth-form-poetry and mannered delivery enraged non-believers. He thought it was Ray Davies meets Bolan. But it's Marlene Dietrich meets Rambling Syd Rumpo. Hilarious."

In a retrospective review of the album, Dave Thompson of AllMusic commented, "Indulging in [the] album for the first time is like waking up from a really weird dream. A handful of songs are slight, even forced, and certainly indicative of the group's inexperience. But others – the labyrinthine "Sebastian," the loquacious "Death Trip" in particular – possess confidence, arrogance, and a doomed, decadent madness which astounds. The Human Menagerie is a dark cabaret – the darkest."

== Track listing ==
All songs written and composed by Steve Harley.

No.	Title	Length
1.	"Hideaway"	3:51
2.	"What Ruthy Said"	2:32
3.	"Loretta's Tale"	4:13
4.	"Crazy Raver"	3:47
5.	"Sebastian"	6:58
6.	"Mirror Freak"	5:13
7.	"My Only Vice"	2:50
8.	"Muriel the Actor"	4:10
9.	"Chameleon"	0:48
10.	"Death Trip"	9:53

1990 EMI and 2004 BGO CD bonus tracks
No.	Title	Length
11.	"Judy Teen"	3:43
12.	"Rock and Roll Parade"	2:55

== Personnel ==
Cockney Rebel

- Steve Harley – vocals
- Jean-Paul Crocker – electric violin, mandolin, guitar
- Milton Reame-James – keyboards
- Paul Jeffreys – Fender bass
- Stuart Elliott – percussion

Additional musicians

- Vicki Brown – backing vocals

Production

- Neil Harrison – producer
- Geoff Emerick – engineer
- Andrew Powell – orchestral arrangements
- Pete & Denny – tapes
- Wally Traugott – mastering

Sleeve

- Peter Vernon – photography
- Star Trek Enterprises – sleeve design
