= Steve Harley & Cockney Rebel =

British glam rock band

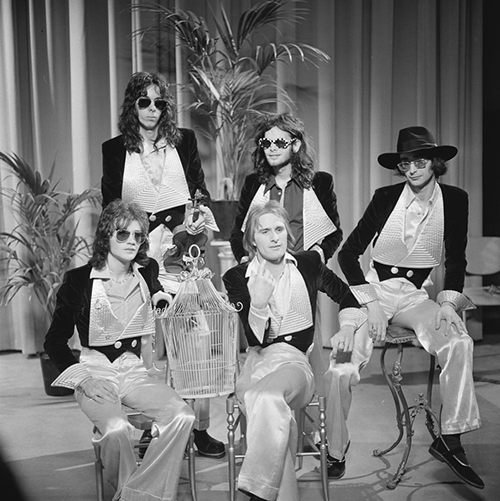
- Cockney Rebel in 1974

Background information
- Also known as: Cockney Rebel
- Origin: London, England
- Genres: Rock, pop, glam rock
- Years active: 1972–1977, 1979–1984, 1989–2024
- Labels: EMI, Chrysalis
- Past members: Steve Harley; John Crocker; Stuart Elliot; Paul Jeffreys; Nick Jones; Pete Newnham; Milton Reame-James; Jim Cregan; George Ford; Francis Monkman; Duncan Mackay; Lindsey Elliott; Billy Dyer; Paul Francis; Robbie Gladwell; Ian Nice; Nick Pynn; Lincoln Anderson; Adam Houghton; James Lascelles; Barry Wickens; Marty Prior; Paul Cuddeford; Kuma Harada; David Delarre; Oli Hayhurst
- Website: steveharley.com

Steve Harley & Cockney Rebel were an English rock band who formed in the early 1970s in London. Their music covered a range of styles from pop to progressive rock. Over the years, they had five albums on the UK Albums Chart and twelve singles on the UK Singles Chart.

== Career ==
Steve Harley grew up in the New Cross area of London, and attended Haberdashers' Aske's Hatcham Boys' School. His musical career began in the late 1960s when he was busking (with John Crocker aka Jean-Paul Crocker) and performing his own songs, some of which were later recorded by him and the band.

=== The original Cockney Rebel ===
After an initial stint as a journalist, Harley hooked up with his former folk music partner, Crocker (fiddle / mandolin / guitar) in 1972 to form the original Cockney Rebel. Crocker had just finished a short stint with Trees and they advertised and auditioned drummer Stuart Elliott, bassist Paul Jeffreys, and guitarist Nick Jones. This line-up played one of the band's first gigs at the Roundhouse, Chalk Farm, London on 23 July 1973, supporting the Jeff Beck Group. Jones was soon replaced by guitarist Pete Newnham, but Harley felt that the Cockney Rebel sound did not need an electric guitar, and they settled on the combination of Crocker's electric violin and the Fender Rhodes piano of keyboardist Milton Reame-James to share the lead. The band was signed to EMI after playing five gigs. Their first single, "Sebastian", was an immediate success in Europe, although it failed to score in the UK Singles Chart. Their debut album, The Human Menagerie, was released in 1973. Although the album was not a commercial success, the band attracted a growing following in London. On Merseyside, a young Andy McCluskey (later of OMD) kept a scrapbook on Harley and was "really excited" by the band.

Harley himself was much written about in the musical press, and the other members began to consider themselves regarded and treated as sidemen rather than co-equals, so there was tension in the band even as they were having a big hit with their second single, "Judy Teen". In May 1974, the British music magazine, NME reported that Cockney Rebel were to undertake their first British tour, including a show at London's Victoria Palace Theatre on 23 June. The album The Psychomodo followed. A Live at the BBC album from 1995 included material recorded during a 1974 BBC Radio 1 broadcast. Following the European single "Psychomodo", a second single from the album, "Mr. Soft", was also a hit. "Tumbling Down" was issued in America as a promotional single. By this time the problems within the band reached a head, and all the musicians, with the exception of Elliott, quit at the end of a successful UK tour, to become session musicians. The original keyboardist, Milton Reame-James, recalled in 2010 that the original band "said goodbye on the steps of Abbey Road studios and were never to meet up again". Crocker continued to write songs and perform, forming a duet with his brother. After a brief period with Be-Bop Deluxe in 1974, Reame-James and Jeffreys formed the band Chartreuse in 1976.

=== Regrouping ===
Harley's next appearance on BBC Television's Top of the Pops, under his own name, was supported by session musicians including Francis Monkman, and B. A. Robertson. The band's single "Big Big Deal" was issued in 1974 and was almost immediately withdrawn.

From then on, the band – billed as Steve Harley & Cockney Rebel – were a band in name only, being more or less a Harley solo project. In 1974, a further album, The Best Years of Our Lives, was released, produced by Alan Parsons. This included the track "Make Me Smile (Come Up and See Me)" which became a UK number one single in February 1975, and was the band's biggest selling hit. Their only No. 1, It sold over one million copies globally. Amongst the backing vocalists on the song was Tina Charles. In a television interview recorded in 2002, Harley described how the lyrics are vindictively directed at the former band members who, he felt, had abandoned him. Bill Nelson, for whose band Be-Bop Deluxe Jeffreys and Reame-James had departed, confirms this story.

One more single from the album, "Mr. Raffles (Man, It Was Mean)" made the Top 20, and the following album Timeless Flight was a top 20 success, although both singles "Black or White" and "White, White Dove" failed to chart. After 1975, Harley struggled to match the success of "Make Me Smile" and faded from fame, and Cockney Rebel eventually disbanded. The band had a surprise Top 10 in the summer of 1976 with a cover version of "Here Comes the Sun". This was followed by the Top 50 single "(I Believe) Love's a Prima Donna" and the album Love's a Prima Donna. Harley also provided vocals on the Alan Parsons Project song "The Voice" on 1977's I Robot.

=== Harley as solo artist ===
Harley released two failed solo albums in the late 1970s; 1978's Hobo with a Grin which featured the two singles "Roll the Dice" and "Someone's Coming", and 1979's The Candidate. He made a minor comeback as a solo artist in the UK Singles Chart with "Freedom's Prisoner" from the latter album. After a brief appearance in the 1980s with a song from Andrew Lloyd Webber's The Phantom of the Opera, the 1982 single "I Can't Even Touch You" was released by Harley under the band name, whilst the 1983 minor hit single "Ballerina (Prima Donna)" was also credited to the band on both sides of the vinyl release, although not on the sleeve, where Harley was solely credited. In 1986, Harley released two singles on RAK; "Irresistible" and "Heartbeat Like Thunder".

Cockney Rebel's original bassist, Paul Jeffreys, was one of those who died in the bombing of Pan Am Flight 103 (the Lockerbie bombing) in 1988. He was with his bride on their honeymoon.

=== Revival of the band ===
In 1988, Harley formed a new line-up of Cockney Rebel and began touring again in 1989. In April 1990, after the success of the 1989 "Come Back, All Is Forgiven" tour, Harley and several members of that tour's line-up reformed as Raffles United, and played four consecutive nights in a pub in Sudbury, London. These concerts were essentially used as Pop Idol style auditions for new band members, in particular a new bassist, lead guitarist, drummer, and violinist. Harley's brother, Ian Nice, who had played keyboards in 1989, remained on keyboards for both this show, and most of the band's tours in the 1990s. The band's line-up that got finalised from these shows ended up debuting on June 5, 1990, at Doncaster Dome, and consisted of Harley, Ian Nice on keyboards, Nick Pynn on violin and guitar, Robbie Gladwell on lead guitar, Paul Francis on drums, and Billy Dyer on bass guitar. As of 2022, Gladwell continues to perform this role in the band, whereas Dyer has returned sporadically when the usual bassist for the band has been ill.

Harley has released several solo albums since – Yes You Can in 1992 (including the singles "Irresistible" and "Star for a Week (Dino)"), Poetic Justice in 1996, and most recently, The Quality of Mercy in 2005 (which included the singles "A Friend for Life" and "The Last Goodbye"), the first since the 1970s to be released with the Cockney Rebel name. He dubbed his touring band 'Cockney Rebel Mark III'.

=== Tours and new material since 2010 ===
In 2010, Steve Harley and Cockney Rebel began touring again setting concert dates for England, Ireland, and Northern Ireland. This was done following the release of the new studio album Stranger Comes to Town. In October 2012, the remastered four-disc box-set anthology compilation album Cavaliers: An Anthology 1973–1974 was released, chronicling the recording career of the original Cockney Rebel line-up. On 24 November 2012 the band including the Orchestra of the Swan and a choir performed the band's first two albums The Human Menagerie and The Psychomodo in their entirety for the first time. A live double-CD and DVD was released in October 2013 of this performance, titled Birmingham.

In 2015, a 16-date UK tour was announced to celebrate the 40th anniversary of The Best Years of Our Lives and "Make Me Smile". Harley reunited with the surviving members of the original second line-up for the tour: Jim Cregan, Stuart Elliott and Duncan Mackay. It marked the first time that Harley and his three bandmates had played together since 1976. As original bassist George Ford died in 2007, the then Cockney Rebel bassist Marty Prior took his place. The band were also joined by current Cockney Rebel violinist and guitarist Barry Wickens, as well as the MonaLisa Twins (Mona and Lisa Wagner) on guitar, percussion and backing vocals.

In 2016, the newly reestablished Chrysalis Records, now owned by Blue Raincoat Music, announced that it had acquired the Cockney Rebel catalogue. Harley was one of the artists who appeared on the label's first release, a charity single of the Rolling Stones' "You Can't Always Get What You Want" credited to Friends of Jo Cox in tribute to Jo Cox, a Labour Party MP who had been assassinated earlier that year.

In the aftermath of the COVID-19 pandemic, Harley's live shows resumed in August 2021. The line-up for the full rock band shows consisted of Harley, Wickens, Lascelles, Gladwell, Elliott, and Harada. The 2021 shows marked the first time this line-up toured together (having only previously played festivals in 2016), as well as Gladwell's full-time return to the band, having stood in sporadically for Paul Cuddeford on a handful of occasions between 2017 and 2020. The set-lists for the 2021 shows featured many songs that had not been played live for many years, in particular from Harley's 1992 album Yes You Can.

=== Acoustic tours ===
After the success of 1998 and 1999's respective 'Stripped To The Bare Bones' and 'Stripped Again' tours, Harley would continue to tour in an acoustic format. Firstly with Jim Cregan and a selection of other members of Cockney Rebel, depending on the exact date of the show, in 2002. This format produced 2003's Acoustic and Pure: Live album. With the exception of the 2015 reunion, which was in the full band format, Cregan would next join Harley for two acoustic shows in March 2020, which otherwise featured Harley performing alone. In 2003 and 2004, the five-piece acoustic line-up that played 2004's Anytime! (A Live Set) album was put together, featuring Lascelles on percussion, Gladwell on lead guitar, Wickens on violin/guitar, and Anderson on double bass. In 2005 and 2006, this format was used in Holland and Belgium while promoting 2005's The Quality Of Mercy album, and these shows are notable for featuring significant rearrangements of some of the songs from the album, which were never played during concerts in England. These shows were played without Anderson.

Between 2010 and 2019, these concerts were revived as a three-man line-up, with Harley alongside Wickens and Lascelles (this time on keyboards and percussion, as per his role in the full rock band shows). These shows were originally marketed as the '3-man acoustic show' before being renamed to 'Acoustic Trio' in 2016. The shows in 2010 were marketed as an 'Acoustic Set', as they were the first UK acoustic shows since 2004. The Trio format was technically a revival of the original acoustic format as envisaged in 1997, which would have been a three-man show with Harley, Nice, and Pynn. This format was phased out in 2020 – in order to promote Harley's new album Uncovered – in favour of a revived four-man line-up, though with David Delarre on lead guitar, and Oli Hayhurst on double bass, with Harley and Wickens reprising their roles. The COVID-19 pandemic delayed most of the shows on this tour – with only the first nine played as planned. Two shows were, however, played in late-September 2020, both in the acoustic trio format, though Hayhurst accompanied the trio on the second of these shows. In addition, Harley held an online Q and A session via Zoom Videoconferencing in mid-December 2020.

=== Reissues and non-band activities ===
Two of the bigger hits appeared in UK television advertisements in the 1990s: "Make Me Smile" for Carlsberg Lager in 1995, prompting the track's return to the UK Top 40; and "Mr Soft" for Trebor Softmints between 1987 and 1994. "Make Me Smile" was used again in a 2005 advertisement for Marks & Spencer. It was also used on the soundtrack of the 1997 film The Full Monty and the 1998 glam rock film Velvet Goldmine, in the latter's case being used in the end credits.

From 1999 to 2008, Harley presented a show on BBC Radio 2 called Sounds of the 70s.

In 2006, EMI released a CD box set compilation album spanning Harley's Cockney Rebel and solo work, titled The Cockney Rebel – A Steve Harley Anthology.

On 25 July 2007, they performed in Warsaw, Poland, and on 28 July 2007 in Saint Petersburg, Russia, in both cases opening the Rolling Stones' concerts.

Original keyboardist, Reame-James, had since joined with James Staddon, Phil Beer and Robbie Johnson to create 'Banana Rebel', who have released a CD Top Banana, available from their website.

Steve Harley died at his home in Suffolk on 17 March 2024, aged 73, after announcing that he had been diagnosed with cancer.

== Discography ==
Cockney Rebel

- The Human Menagerie (1973)
- The Psychomodo (1974)

Steve Harley & Cockney Rebel studio discography

- The Best Years of Our Lives (1975)
- Timeless Flight (1976)
- Love's a Prima Donna (1976)
- The Quality of Mercy (2005)

== Personnel ==
=== 1970s ===
Cockney Rebel: line-up 1 (1972)

- Steve Harley – vocals, guitar
- John Crocker – violin, mandolin, guitar
- Nick Jones – guitar
- Paul Jeffreys – bass
- Stuart Elliott – drums

Cockney Rebel: line-up 2 (1972)

- Steve Harley – vocals, guitar
- John Crocker – violin, mandolin, guitar
- Pete Newnham – guitar
- Paul Jeffreys – bass
- Stuart Elliott – drums

Cockney Rebel: line-up 3 (1972 to 1974)

- Steve Harley – vocals, guitar
- John Crocker – violin, mandolin, guitar
- Milton Reame-James – keyboards
- Paul Jeffreys – bass
- Stuart Elliott – drums

Steve Harley & Cockney Rebel (1974 to 1977)

- Steve Harley – vocals, guitar
- Jim Cregan – guitar (left in 1976)
- George Ford – bass
- Duncan Mackay – keyboards
- Stuart Elliott – drums
- Lindsay Elliott – percussion (1975–1977)
- Snowy White – guitar (The Best Years of Our Lives tour only, 1975)
- Jo Partridge – guitar (1976–1977)

Steve Harley & Cockney Rebel (1979)

- Steve Harley – vocals, guitar
- Jo Partridge – guitar
- Nico Ramsden – guitar
- Jimmy Horowitz – keyboards
- John Gibb – bass
- Stuart Elliott – drums
- Lindsey Elliott – percussion

=== 1980s ===
Steve Harley & Cockney Rebel (1980)

- Steve Harley – vocals, guitar
- Rick Driscoll – guitar
- Alan Darby – guitar
- Guy Fletcher – keyboards
- Kevin Powell – bass
- Lindsay Elliott – drums

Steve Harley & Cockney Rebel (1981)

- Steve Harley – vocals, guitar
- Rick Driscoll – guitar, backing vocals
- Alan Darby – guitar
- Andy Qunta – keyboards
- Gavin Hodgson – bass
- Lindsay Elliott – drums

Steve Harley & Cockney Rebel (1984)

- Steve Harley – vocals, guitar
- Rick Driscoll – guitar, backing vocals
- Alan Darby – guitar
- Barry Wickens – violin, guitar, backing vocals
- Ian Nice – keyboards
- Kevin Powell – bass, backing vocals
- Lindsay Elliott – drums
- Martin Jay – backing vocals
- Suzanne Murphy – backing vocals

Steve Harley & Cockney Rebel (1989)

- Steve Harley – lead vocals, guitar
- Rick Driscoll – guitar, backing vocals
- Barry Wickens – violin, guitar, backing vocals
- Ian Nice – keyboards
- Kevin Powell – bass, backing vocals
- Stuart Elliott – drums

=== 1990s ===
Steve Harley & Cockney Rebel (1990)

- Steve Harley – lead vocals, guitar
- Robbie Gladwell – guitar
- Nick Pynn – violin, guitar
- Ian Nice – keyboards
- Bill Dyer – bass
- Paul Francis – drums

Steve Harley & Cockney Rebel (1996)

- Steve Harley – vocals, guitar
- Nick Pynn – guitar, violin, mandocello
- Tom Arnold – keyboards
- Susan Harvey – keyboards, backing vocals
- Bill Dyer – bass
- Andy Houghton – drums

=== 2000s ===
Steve Harley & Cockney Rebel (2001)

- Steve Harley – vocals, guitar
- Robbie Gladwell – guitar
- Barry Wickens – violin, guitar, backing vocals
- James Lascelles – keyboards
- Lincoln Anderson – bass
- Andy Houghton – drums
- Victoria Beebee – backing vocals, percussion

Steve Harley & Cockney Rebel (2005)

- Steve Harley – vocals, guitar
- Robbie Gladwell – guitar
- Barry Wickens – violin, guitar, backing vocals
- James Lascelles – keyboards
- Lincoln Anderson – bass
- Andy Houghton – drums

=== 2010s ===
Steve Harley & Cockney Rebel (2015)

- Steve Harley – vocals, guitar
- Jim Cregan – guitar
- Barry Wickens – violin, guitar, backing vocals
- Duncan Mackay – keyboards
- Marty Prior – electric and double bass, backing vocals
- Stuart Elliott – drums
- Lisa Wagner – guitar, backing vocals
- Mona Wagner – percussion, backing vocals

== See also ==
- List of songs recorded by Steve Harley
- List of glam rock artists
- List of artists who reached number one on the UK Singles Chart
- List of performers on Top of the Pops
- List of Peel sessions
