= Judy Teen =

1974 song by Cockney Rebel

- Dutch cover of "Judy Teen"

Single by Cockney Rebel
- B-side: "Spaced Out"
- Released: 11 March 1974
- Genre: Glam rock
- Length: 3:45
- Label: EMI
- Songwriter: Steve Harley
- Producers: Steve Harley; Alan Parsons

Cockney Rebel singles chronology
"Sebastian" (1973)	"Judy Teen" (1974)	"Hideaway" (1974)

Alternative Cover
- German cover of "Judy Teen"

Official audio
- Juddy Teen (2012 Remaster) on YouTube

"Judy Teen" is a song by the British rock band Cockney Rebel, fronted by Steve Harley. It was released as a non-album single in 1974, and became the band's first UK hit, after their debut single, "Sebastian", was only a hit in continental Europe. "Judy Teen" was written by Harley, and produced by Harley and Alan Parsons.

== Writing ==
While Cockney Rebel's debut single "Sebastian" was a big hit across continental Europe in 1973–74, it failed to enter the UK charts, as did the band's debut album, The Human Menagerie, when it was released in November 1973. The band's lack of a breakthrough in the UK left their label, EMI Records, feeling that the band had yet to record a song with hit single potential. In response, Harley went away to re-work an unfinished song of his titled "Judy Teen", with the objective of providing EMI with the next single. Harley told Rock Scene in 1975, "'Judy Teen' was deliberately produced for the singles market. I just wanted to sit down and show them that I could create one, and I did!" He later elaborated, "When the first album came out, the record company said, 'We don't have a single.' And I said very arrogantly, 'I'll write one, I know how to do it.' That's exactly what I said and exactly what I did. Now I think – what an arrogant young man, fearless!"

Speaking of the song, Harley has said, "'Judy Teen' was a boy/girl story, a teenage romance, a bit of sex in there, interesting drum rhythm, hooks all over the place – lo and behold big hit! It's a good sexy little teenage love story. When I wrote 'Judy Teen', I was 18 or 19 when I had the experience that that song came from." Harley was inspired musically by the melody of "Catch a Falling Star", while the "Judy" in the song was inspired by one of his early girlfriends, who was from New York but lived in London. Harley recalled in 2021, "She wasn't called Judy, [but] she was my short-lived girlfriend. We only lasted a few months [and] had a lot of fun together. She was feisty, a very interesting young woman. You'd have thought she was from California, she was so close to being a real hippy."

== Recording ==
Cockney Rebel originally recorded "Judy Teen" as a demo in 1972, but it was not recorded for The Human Menagerie. The band's earliest incarnation, featuring Pete Newnham on guitar, recorded three demos at Riverside Recordings: "Judy Teen", "Ritz" and "That's Alright That's Me". Another early version of "Judy Teen" was recorded at Audio International Studios on 1 March 1973 and was released in 2012 on Cavaliers: An Anthology 1973–1974.

When the song was recorded by Cockney Rebel in 1974, with Harley and Alan Parsons producing, the decision was made to overtrack Jean-Paul Crocker's violin approximately twenty times rather than use a string section. Harley told Rock Scene, "That gave me that special sounding effect and that sold it!"

== Release ==
Once Harley finished developing "Judy Teen", which included rewriting the lyrics, the band recorded it as their next single with Harley and Alan Parsons as the producers. It was delivered to EMI with an expected release in early 1974, but the label soon decided to delay the release in favour of giving "Sebastian" its third UK re-issue on 25 January 1974. "Sebastian" failed again to become a UK hit and EMI then released "Judy Teen" as a single in March. It successfully broke the band commercially in the UK, reaching number 5 in the UK Singles Chart, and it remained in the top 50 for eleven weeks. It reached number one on Capital Radio's 'Capital Countdown' Top 40, and was chosen as Johnnie Walker's 'Record of the Week' on BBC Radio 1. The song also found chart success in Europe too.

The UK success of "Judy Teen" gave the band instant popularity, which the band discovered during the 42–date UK tour for their second album The Psychomodo. Speaking to New Musical Express in June 1974, drummer Stuart Elliott spoke of the change in audience since "Judy Teen" became a hit, "The only trouble with the hit single is that they only come for that. We'll play a whole set from The Psychomodo and The Human Menagerie, and they don't really appreciate it. As soon as you play 'Judy Teen' they go bloody mad." Violinist Jean-Paul Crocker added,

The trouble with this tour has been the cock-up because of the single. It went into the charts a week before we started the tour, and it's going up and up and up. It's what? – number five this week. And if it gets any higher by the end of the tour, it's going to be a riot. We had riots, literally riots, every night last week. That's why Tony's here (the security guard). We did a gig in York and there were bottlefights – and we had a rough time of it in Newcastle. But when I came off at York I was in tears, because we'd never seen it before. It was the people in the front row who caused all the trouble – because they're the ones who knew the single.

"Judy Teen" was released by EMI Records on 7-inch vinyl in the UK, Ireland, Belgium, Germany, Holland, Spain, Portugal, Italy, Japan and Australia. The B-side, "Spaced Out", was written by Harley, and produced by Harley and Parsons. It was exclusive to the single, but would later be included on a number of releases, the first being the 1992 CD single re-issue of the band's 1975 hit "Make Me Smile (Come Up and See Me)". It has also appeared as a bonus track on the 2000 CD re-issue of Harley's 1978 album Hobo with a Grin and on Cavaliers: An Anthology 1973–1974.

== Promotion ==
A music video was filmed in April 1974, which featured the band performing the song, with some shots using kaleidoscope effects. On 23 May 1974, the band performed the song on the UK music show Top of the Pops. Although small segments of the performance survive, the original, full video has been presumed lost.

Since its release, "Judy Teen" was a consistent inclusion in Harley and the band's concerts, and various live versions have been recorded for official releases. On 14 April 1975, Steve Harley & Cockney Rebel performed the song as part of their set at the Hammersmith Odeon, London, which was filmed and released as the film Between the Lines. Further live versions have been included on Live from London (1985), Stripped to the Bare Bones (1999), Anytime! (A Live Set) (2004), Live at the Isle of Wight Festival (2005) and Birmingham (Live with Orchestra & Choir) (2013).

== Critical reception ==
Upon its release, Charles Shaar Murray of New Musical Express described "Judy Teen" as "another mincingly affected Roxy Music cop[y], but it could conceivably affect others differently". He added that the song's introduction was "exactly the same" as the DeFranco Family's "Abra-Ca-Dabra". Peter Jones of Record & Radio Mirror noted the song's "delicate, tinkling opening" and "very together sound as it builds along". He concluded, "If this one does make it, it will do it against the normal odds, because it isn't a straight, blatant commercial effort. I like it." Deborah Thomas of the Daily Mirror wrote, "A hanky panky hit for madcap popsters Cockney Rebel. Clever words, a commercial tune and screwball sound effects make for a sure-fire success." Dave Lewis of the Acton Gazette and West London Post considered the song to be "a sort of Mexican two-step picked out on an electric mandolin with a beefy backing". He did not believe the song would be the one to provide Cockney Rebel with a commercial breakthrough. The Belgian magazine Juke Box described the song as mixing the rhythm of "Sweet Pea" (the Manfred Mann version) with a little bit of "Catch a Falling Star".

Donald A. Guarisco retrospectively reviewed the song for AllMusic, stating, "Most glam acts were either arty or purely commercial, but other groups were able to blend both styles to create singles that were as challenging as they were catchy. Harley was able to straddle this balance and 'Judy Teen' is a good example of this skill". He noted the "light-hearted lyrics", the "swinging mid-tempo verses" with a "waltz-like beat" and the "more up-tempo chorus that builds to an effervescent peak". He concluded, "The song's plentiful hooks [are wrapped] in some unique ear candy, the result catchy enough for a wide audience but clever enough to snare in ambitious listeners with its wordplay." Carol Clerk of Classic Rock, in a 2006 review of The Cockney Rebel – A Steve Harley Anthology, commented on the song being "exquisitely crafted and arranged, and determinedly eccentric to boot". Chris Roberts of Uncut commented, "Harley's band slid perfectly into the post-Ziggy/Roxy slipstream, all mannered English vocals, florid lyrics and sexual-theatrical rock. Tricksy hits like 'Judy Teen' and 'Mr. Soft' displayed arch wit." In 2022, Uncut listed "Judy Teen" at number 16 on their "Top 40 Glam Rock Singles" list. The magazine wrote that Harley's "arch vocal mannerisms" gave the "ode to flamboyance" a "Carmen Miranda quality", and, with its "co-starr[ing] pizzicato violin", the song "sounded wonderfully decadent on daytime radio".

In a 1990 interview, English musician and singer David Gedge of The Wedding Present recalled "Judy Teen" as being an early musical influence, "The first single I heard was 'Judy Teen' on Top of the Pops and I thought it was brilliant. I've always liked things which are a bit extreme, and for someone to come into TOTP and look like that and make this record that was so strange, I was quite impressed by it really." Suggs, the lead singer of Madness, picked it as the "first song I fell in love with" in a 2025 feature for The Guardian. He also recalled how he "liked [Harley's] look" on Top of the Pops.

== Track listing ==
7-inch single

1. "Judy Teen" – 3:45
2. "Spaced Out" – 3:04

== Personnel ==
Cockney Rebel

- Steve Harley – lead vocals
- Jean-Paul Crocker – electric violin, guitar
- Paul Jeffreys – Fender bass
- Milton Reame-James – keyboards
- Stuart Elliott – drums, percussion

Production

- Steve Harley – producer
- Alan Parsons – producer

== Charts ==
Chart (1974)	Peak position
Belgium (Ultratop 50 Flanders)	23
Belgium (Ultratop 50 Wallonia)	42
Netherlands (Dutch Top 40)	26
Netherlands (Single Top 100)	26
UK Singles (OCC)	5
