= Paul Jeffreys =

English rock musician (1952–1988)

Background information
- Born: Paul Avron Jeffreys; 13 February 1952
- Died: 21 December 1988 (aged 36) Lockerbie, Scotland
- Genres: Alternative rock
- Occupation: Musician
- Instrument: Bass guitar
- Formerly of: Cockney Rebel (1972–1974); Be-Bop Deluxe (1974); Warm Jets (1977–1980); Electric Eels (1980–1981)

Paul Avron Jeffreys (13 February 1952 – 21 December 1988) was an English rock musician. He played bass guitar in Cockney Rebel between 1972 and 1974, working on the group's first two albums, and later worked with a number of British bands, including Be-Bop Deluxe (1974), Warm Jets (1977–1980) and Electric Eels (1980–1981).

== Death ==
He died, along with his wife Rachel Jeffreys (née Jones), at the age of 36. The couple were on Pan Am Flight 103 on the way to their honeymoon when the aircraft was blown up in a terrorist attack, scattering debris over the town of Lockerbie in Scotland.
