= The Last Goodbye (Steve Harley & Cockney Rebel song) =

2006 song by Steve Harley & Cockney Rebel

Single by Steve Harley & Cockney Rebel

from the album The Quality of Mercy
- B-side: "Understand (Live)"
- Released: 6 February 2006
- Genre: Rock
- Length: 3:54
- Label: Gott Discs
- Songwriter(s): Steve Harley; Jim Cregan
- Producer(s): Steve Harley

Steve Harley & Cockney Rebel singles chronology
"A Friend for Life" (2001)	"The Last Goodbye" (2006)	"Faith & Virtue" (2010)

"The Last Goodbye" is a song by the English rock band Steve Harley & Cockney Rebel, released on 6 February 2006 as a single from their sixth and final studio album, The Quality of Mercy (2005). The song was written by Harley and ex-Cockney Rebel guitarist Jim Cregan, and was produced by Harley.

== Background ==
In 2005, Harley described "The Last Goodbye" as being "about relationships, struggles and self doubts and asking what is the meaning of life".

As with the rest of the material on The Quality of Mercy, "The Last Goodbye" was recorded by Harley and his touring line-up of Cockney Rebel at Ipswich's Gemini Recording Studios in 2005. The album was released in October 2005 and was the first studio album to use the Steve Harley & Cockney Rebel name since 1976. "The Last Goodbye" was released as a single from the album on 6 February 2006. It peaked at number 186 in the UK Singles Chart and number 21 in the UK Independent Singles Chart Top 50.

== Release ==
"The Last Goodbye" was released by Gott Discs on 7-inch and CD formats in the UK only, with Pinnacle Records handling the single's distribution. The sleeve features a close-up photograph of Harley, which was taken by Mick Rock. The B-side "Understand" is a seven-minute live recording of the song originally recorded for Cockney Rebel's 1976 album Timeless Flight. The live version was recorded at Blackheath Halls in London during 2001 and was produced by Harley.

== Promotion ==
"The Last Goodbye" was featured in the set-list during the band's 50+ date UK and European tour promoting The Quality of Mercy in 2005. In an online diary entry dated 14 November 2005, Harley spoke of performing the song at a concert in Holland, "Last night I sang 'The Last Goodbye' entirely alone, largo, slow and dignified to open the show, until Robbie entered for a solo." The song was also played during the band's 2006 UK and European tour, and was the opening track for the band's May–July 2008 UK tour. Since 2008, however, the song was rarely featured in the band's set-lists.

== Critical reception ==
In a review of The Quality of Mercy, Birmingham 101 Gig Guide commented, "Co-penned by ex-Rebel Jim Cregan, 'The Last Goodbye' shows Harley's ability to pen classic, radio friendly quality pop hasn't dimmed with the years." Carol Clerk of Classic Rock described the "bright up-tempo" song as "very approachable musically", which "offset[s] the deep anxieties at the heart of the lyrics". John Aizelwood of Q highlighted the song as one of three "Download" pick tracks from the album. Stein Østbø of the Norwegian website VG noted "The Last Goodbye" as an example of how Harley "still writes beautiful, melodic songs in a safe pop-rock landscape". Rune Westengen of the Norwegian website RB considered it a "more rocking, Costello-like track".

== Track listing ==
7-inch single (UK)

1. "The Last Goodbye" – 3:54
2. "Understand" (Live) – 7:03

CD single (UK)

1. "The Last Goodbye" – 3:54
2. "Understand" (Live) – 7:03

== Personnel ==
"The Last Goodbye"

- Steve Harley – vocals, guitar, producer
- Robbie Gladwell – electric guitar
- Barry Wickens – acoustic guitar
- James Lascelles – keyboards
- Lincoln Anderson – bass
- Adam Houghton – drums

"Understand" (Live)

- Steve Harley – vocals
- Robbie Gladwell – electric guitar, backing vocals
- Barry Wickens – acoustic guitar, backing vocals
- James Lascelles – piano
- Lincoln Anderson – bass
- Adam Houghton – drums
- Vikki Beebee – percussion, backing vocals

Production

- Steve Harley – producer
- Pat Grueber – recording engineer on "The Last Goodbye"
- Matt Butler – remix engineer on "The Last Goodbye"
- Denis Blackham – mastering on "The Last Goodbye"

Other

- Asgard – representation
- Mick Rock – cover photo
- Mark Scarfe at Aarlsen – original sleeve design
- CLE Print – reprographics

== Charts ==
Chart (2006)	Peak position
UK Independent Singles Chart Top 50 (OCC)	21
UK Singles Chart (OCC)	186
