= The Cockney Rebel – A Steve Harley Anthology =

Compilation album by Steve Harley & Cockney Rebel/Steve Harley
- Released: 2 October 2006
- Genre: Rock, pop, glam rock, progressive rock
- Label: EMI

Steve Harley & Cockney Rebel/Steve Harley chronology
The Quality of Mercy (2005)	The Cockney Rebel – A Steve Harley Anthology (2006)	Stranger Comes to Town (2010)

The Cockney Rebel – A Steve Harley Anthology is a remastered three-disc box-set anthology by Steve Harley, released by EMI on 2 October 2006. It features material from Cockney Rebel, Steve Harley & Cockney Rebel and Harley's solo career, spanning over 33 years from The Human Menagerie (1973) to The Quality of Mercy (2005).

The anthology was compiled by project manager Nigel Reeve and designed by Chris Peyton. The album's sleeve notes were written by music journalist Geoff Barton. The final track on disc 3, a live recording of "Only You", is highlighted as being previously unreleased, although it had originally appeared on the 1999 live album Stripped to the Bare Bones.

Following its release, Harley spoke of the anthology in an October 2006 diary entry for his official website: "The anthology is selling here in bucket-loads. I can't deny I'm proud of it. EMI have done a good job in all respects. You can't please everyone, but the 42 tracks seem a pretty fair reflection of my career so far." He later added in a January 2007 entry: "The release was the equivalent of the gold watch for long-service, but gave me lots of warm feelings."

== Critical reception ==
Professional ratings
Review scores
Source	Rating
Classic Rock	7/10 stars
BBC Nottingham	3.5/5 stars
Uncut	3/5 stars

Upon its release, Carol Clerk of Classic Rock stated: "Although Steve Harley is rightly remembered for his clutch of audacious pop hits with Cockney Rebel in the mid 70's, this three-CD set charts a long and accomplished career. 'Sebastian' was a brave first single with its choral and orchestral dramas. Later favourites such as 'Judy Teen' and 'Mr Soft' were exquisitely crafted and arranged, and determinedly eccentric to boot. Intelligence has always been key to Harley's songwriting, which is why 'Make Me Smile (Come Up and See Me)' still sounds fresh and innovative. Harley subsequently moved the band into more experimental areas for the albums Timeless Flight and Love's a Prima Donna. The American flavours and gospelly flourishes of Hobo with a Grin reflect Harley's residence in Los Angeles. He returned to music in the 90s, memorably with the slow-burning 'All in a Life's Work' and 'The Last Time I Saw You' from Poetic Justice. The Quality of Mercy, his most recent offering from 2005, explored extremely personal emotions, producing arguably Harley's most affecting collection to date."

Jake Jakeman of BBC Nottingham commented: "A three CD set might seem over the top for an artist we fondly remember for singing 'Make Me Smile' and 'Here Comes the Sun' and who now happily presents Sounds of the 70s on BBC Radio 2. Three CDs is a lot to maintain the quality threshold and by the time we reach the final collection the songs are a pale representation of what's gone before (although 'Freedom's Prisoner' still has its merits). But it's good to have a substantial collection that shows the diversity of the man and his band." Chris Roberts of Uncut wrote: "Harley's ever-changing band slid perfectly into the post-Ziggy/Roxy slipstream, all mannered English vocals, florid lyrics and sexual-theatrical rock. Tricksy hits like 'Judy Teen' and 'Mr Soft' displayed arch wit, whilst fan favourite 'Sebastian' was a quite wonderful seven-minute epic. After the all-conquering 'Make Me Smile', it was as if Harley was sated. His subsequent albums, both solo and under the band name, were measured and less edgy."

== Track listing ==
=== Disc one ===
No.	Title	Writer(s)	Length
1.	"Sebastian"	Steve Harley	7:00
2.	"Rock and Roll Parade"	Harley	2:55
3.	"Hideaway"	Harley	3:52
4.	"Loretta's Tale"	Harley	4:15
5.	"Death Trip"	Harley	9:56
6.	"Judy Teen"	Harley	3:44
7.	"Spaced Out"	Harley	3:03
8.	"Psychomodo"	Harley	4:03
9.	"Bed in the Corner"	Harley	3:35
10.	"Ritz"	Harley	7:15
11.	"Mr Soft"	Harley	3:20
12.	"Sling It!"	Harley	2:41
13.	"Tumbling Down"	Harley	5:54
14.	"Big Big Deal"	Harley	4:35

=== Disc two ===
No.	Title	Writer(s)	Length
1.	"Make Me Smile (Come Up and See Me)"	Harley	4:00
2.	"The Best Years of Our Lives"	Harley	5:49
3.	"Mr. Raffles (Man, It Was Mean)"	Harley	4:36
4.	"Mad Mad Moonlight"	Harley	4:32
5.	"Red is a Mean, Mean Colour"	Harley	4:34
6.	"Understand"	Harley	7:17
7.	"All Men Are Hungry"	Harley	4:53
8.	"I Believe Love's a Prima Donna"	Harley	4:11
9.	"(Love) Compared with You"	Harley	4:24
10.	"Here Comes the Sun"	George Harrison	2:56
11.	"Innocence and Guilt"	Harley	7:18
12.	"Roll the Dice"	Harley, Jo Partridge	3:31
13.	"Living in a Rhapsody"	Jim Cregan, Harley, Duncan Mackay	4:23
14.	"Riding the Waves (For Virginia Woolf)"	Harley	4:35

=== Disc three ===
No.	Title	Writer(s)	Length
1.	"Freedom's Prisoner"	Harley, Jimmy Horowitz	3:53
2.	"One More Time"	Harley	4:30
3.	"I Can't Even Touch You"	Harley	4:03
4.	"Irresistible (Remix)"	Harley	5:13
5.	"Star for a Week (Dino)"	Harley	4:35
6.	"The Lighthouse"	Harley	6:01
7.	"New Fashioned Way"	Harley, Mackay	7:20
8.	"All in a Life's Work"	Harley	4:58
9.	"That's My Life In Your Hands"	Harley, Hugh Nicholson	3:49
10.	"The Last Time I Saw You"	Harley	5:13
11.	"The Coast of Amalfi"	Harley	5:17
12.	"Journey's End (A Father's Promise)"	Harley, Lincoln Anderson, Robbie Gladwell, James Lascelles, Barry Wickens	4:05
13.	"A Friend for Life"	Harley, Cregan	4:43
14.	"Only You (Live)"	Harley	5:14
