= The Quality of Mercy (album) =

Studio album by Steve Harley & Cockney Rebel
- Released: 3 October 2005 (UK); 14 March 2006 (Norway)
- Genre: Rock
- Length: 44:45
- Label: Gott Discs (UK); Universal Music (Norway)
- Producer: Steve Harley; Jim Cregan (track 9)

Steve Harley & Cockney Rebel chronology
Anytime! (A Live Set) (2004)	The Quality of Mercy (2005)	The Cockney Rebel – A Steve Harley Anthology (2006)

Singles from The Quality of Mercy
- 1. "A Friend for Life" Released: 30 April 2001; 2. "The Last Goodbye" Released: 6 February 2006

The Quality of Mercy is the sixth and final studio album by English rock band Steve Harley & Cockney Rebel, which was released by Gott Discs on 3 October 2005. The album was Steve Harley's first studio album in 9 years and the first in 29 years to be released under the Cockney Rebel name. The album was produced entirely by Harley, with Jim Cregan co-producing the track "A Friend for Life". The album's title is based on the Shakespearean phrase.

== Writing and recording ==
"I am proud of The Quality Of Mercy – it's as good an album as I could make today. I have made a record for me. It is a man looking back at life."

— Steve Harley discussing the album.

Harley began working on the recording of a new studio album in 2000 and during that year he began talks with various record companies. In September 2000, he commented in his online diary, "Plans to further the recording career in hand. Negotiations are taking place daily and constantly. I am determined that 'A Friend for Life' will be available in the shops and on the radio in time for the next Spring band tour, with an album, God willing, in the can. I am the eternal optimist, as you probably know. I have 'A Friend for Life' and 'When the Halo Slips' and several others 90% finished on record." Later in November, he added, "If the deal I want is forthcoming and a contract signed within, then I'll be studio-bound through January and February making that album. There are something like 50 songs half-to-75% finished on cassettes and mini-discs around my study, bags, and all around the grand piano."

Although "A Friend for Life" was released by Intrinsic Records as a single in April 2001, no studio album would be released until 2005. Between 2001 and 2005, Harley continued to write new material, record in the studio and hold discussions with various record labels. In August 2004, Harley commented in an online diary entry that he was still writing new material and that the upcoming album would include "A Friend for Life" and "The Last Feast".

Harley and his touring band Cockney Rebel went into Gemini Recording Studio in Ipswich to start recording for what would become The Quality of Mercy in February 2005. In a diary entry from that month, Harley commented of the week-long recording session, "We are all pretty high, to be honest. The band have played with spirit and shown an understanding of my new songs that comes best from musicians you've got close to over hundreds of touring concerts. I left six new recordings, all about 70% finished, to go back to soon." By June, recording sessions for the album were coming to an end, with Harley reporting, "I am recording the best album I have ever recorded. This album is huge. I do not know where it is coming from." Later in the month, he added, "This is a proper record, all right. We have recorded part-analogue, part-digital and have mixed on the highest grade of Pro-tools. It sounds delicious. It has all cost a lot of money, but sounds like it cost much more."

In a June 2005 interview for Record Collector, Harley commented, "I'm recording The Quality of Mercy. I don't know if it'll ever be like the first Cockney Rebel, when I had a thousand ideas, but I felt like I'm 22 again." In a September 2005 interview with icLiverpool, he added, "Suddenly that inspiration is there and you go for broke – I managed to write seven or eight songs in about a month." Noted to have been Harley's most personal album, Harley revealed to Brighton Argus in October 2005:

"In the past, I never exposed myself. I always couched my meaning in metaphor and allegory. But now I've had enough of covering up. So the songs are more explicit. There's blood in these tracks. I like to please people, I don't like rejection. But with this album, I've written it for me. Not to get hit records, please the music company or even the fans, just for me. And I can honestly say I've used everything I've been given. This is what I want people to remember me for. Not just 'Make Me Smile'."

At his "An Audience With....." show in Stamford, Lincolnshire, earlier in 2005, Harley spoke of the album and its recording,

"I am making a record that pleases me – I can only hope it then pleases lots of other people, including the critics. We have a wild drum sound on the rocky tracks and the lyrics are flowing once again. I am very, very excited about this project. The band have looked at me as though I'm mad, when I've put forward certain production ideas, but they've come to accept now that sometimes the safe way is not necessarily the best way forward."

== Song information ==
"Journey's End (A Father's Promise)" was written when Harley's son, Kerr Nice, left his parents' home. Nice plays piano on the track. At one point in mid-2005, the song was considered as a single, with an intended August release date, but this never materialised.

"Saturday Night at the Fair" was originally titled "Having a Night at the Fair". The track's piano and strings were added by James Larcelles in October 2004. Harley described the song as "dancey, romantic (even saucy, dear)" in a diary entry and added, "Sounds extremely radio-friendly to my old ears at this stage, and so I will probably (shamefully) gear it deliberately in that direction."

"The Coast of Amalfi" was inspired by the Italian town of the same name, with its lyrics being penned in early 2005. In an October 2008 interview on songwriting and poetry for The Argotist Online, Harley spoke of the structure of "The Coast of Amalfi", saying, "I have written several songs with no middle-eight, no discernable bridge, and even no chorus, per se. Try 'The Coast of Amalfi' on my most recent CD. Narrative can be more interesting to a listener, but the story must hold their attention if no chorus appears for them to hum along to." In 2008, the Belgian musical actor Hans Peter Janssens recorded a version of the song in Italian ("La Costa Di Amalfi"). It used the band's original recording, including Harley's English-language vocal as a "shadow vocal".

"The Last Feast" has a duration of over seven minutes and contains eight verses. It recalls Harley's near-fatal contraction of childhood polio and was written in a couple of days at Algarve in Portugal in 2000. The song debuted as a work in progress at Harley's concert at Blackheath Halls in October 2000 (live versions played between then and 2005 fluctuated between having 8 and 10 verses). Speaking to the Edinburgh Evening News in 2001, Harley said, "No one talked about it back then. I'm writing this song about my life, 'The Last Feast', which does own up to the fact that I have this problem, so now maybe everybody will talk about it. Basically, it's no big deal. I limp a bit – nothing else. I can't play football or run for a bus, so what?" Speaking to the Brighton Argus in 2005, Harley recalled, "I was in Brighton. My mum was in hospital in London giving birth and my sister and I were sent to stay at my gran's in Hangleton Road. I could barely walk. When I returned to London, my dad said, 'Steve isn't right'. It was diagnosed as flu but my dad took me to hospital and I was found to be dying. That's why I sing the line, 'I've been dreaming I'm in paradise.' It's cathartic to sing about it." Harley played the song frequently during the band's 2001 tour and recordings of "The Last Feast" being performed live later appeared on Acoustic and Pure: Live (2003) and Anytime! (A Live Set) (2004). After 2005, the song would not be played again until Harley's 2018 Christmas shows, before becoming a regular feature in the setlist during the band's 2021 tour.

"A Friend for Life" was first released as a non-album single in 2001 and had reached number 125 in the UK charts. The song, written by Harley and Jim Cregan, was originally offered to Rod Stewart, who would later record the song for his 2015 album Another Country. The Quality of Mercy features Harley's original 2000 recording of the song. The song "For Sale. Baby Shoes. Never Worn" was originally to be included on The Quality of Mercy and was mentioned in Harley's diary as having been recorded during the February 2005 sessions. However, it did not make the final track listing. The song was later re-recorded for Harley's 2010 album Stranger Comes to Town.

== Artwork ==
During the summer of 2005, British photographer Mick Rock visited London to feature on an episode of Harley's BBC Radio 2 show Sounds of the 70s. After recording the show, the pair then went outside Broadcasting House for an impromptu photo session for The Quality of Mercy cover. The shoot was completed in 20 minutes. It was originally intended for Manfred Esser to shoot the album's cover photo in Germany in April 2005.

== Release ==
The Quality of Mercy was released on CD in the UK on 3 October 2005 by Gott Discs, with Pinnacle Records handling the distribution. The album was released to coincide with the band's upcoming UK and European tour, Harley's largest since the 1970s, which was made up of over 50 dates between late September and early December. In his effort to complete the album on time, the mixing was undertaken in six days at Harley's home with the assistance of engineer Matt Butler.

A single from the album, "The Last Goodbye", was released in February 2006, reaching number 186 in the UK and number 21 in the UK Independent Singles Chart. On 14 March 2006, Universal Music released the album in Norway, where it reached number 40 in the charts. In February 2006, Harley was in talks with a record company over releasing The Quality of Mercy in America, but this never came to fruition.

In June 2005, before the release of the album, Gott Discs released a re-recording of the band's 1975 UK number one "Make Me Smile (Come Up and See Me)" as a single to celebrate its 30th anniversary. On the CD edition of the single, a preview of the forthcoming album was included as "The Quality of Mercy Taster". It provided an extract of two songs, "Saturday Night at the Fair" and "The Coast of Amalfi".

== Critical reception ==
Professional ratings
Review scores
Source	Rating
Classic Rock	8/10 stars
Cross Rhythms	8/10 stars
Q	3/5 stars
Record Collector	5/5 stars
The Sunday Express	4/5 stars
Uncut	2/5 stars

On its release, The Sunday Express commented, "A genuine Seventies pop maverick, Harley has evolved into a highly-literate and intimate balladeer. 'The Coast of Amalfi' and 'A Friend for Life' are elegant if care-worn gems." Nick Dalton of Record Collector said, "Harley's first Cockney Rebel album in 26 years may owe more to his softer, recent solo work, but it's sublime. Harley proves he's lost none of his word power, nor indeed his knack with a good tune. It's a mature piece of work, yet not without an engaging edginess and irrepressible enthusiasm." John Aizelwood of Q stated, "To the delight of his fan[s], [Harley's] occasional new albums disappoint nobody. The centrepiece is the autobiographical 'The Last Feast'."

Carol Clerk of Classic Rock said, "Harley has produced what might just be his best album to date. The Quality of Mercy is brimful of songs that are intensely personal and sometimes harrowing but, musically, very approachable." Steve Best of Cross Rhythms described the album as "a fine piece of work" and added, "It is beautifully written and performed with a very British folk-pop sound." Nick Hasted of Uncut wrote, "The acerbic swagger of Harley's real Rebel years is absent on this set. Harley's concerns now are adult: fathers and sons, nostalgia and ennui, presented with the self-importance of an adolescent, minus the energy. 'A Friend for Life' retains some brutal Cockney bite about married stasis, and 'The Coast of Amalfi's dope reverie is artful. Otherwise, ignore."

== Track listing ==
All tracks are written by Steve Harley except where noted.

No.	Title	Writer(s)	Length
1.	"The Last Goodbye"	Harley, Jim Cregan	3:56
2.	"Journey's End (A Father's Promise)"	Harley, Lincoln Anderson, Robbie Gladwell, James Lascelles, Barry Wickens	4:07
3.	"Saturday Night at the Fair"		4:30
4.	"No Rain on This Parade"		4:44
5.	"The Coast of Amalfi"		5:19
6.	"The Last Feast"		7:35
7.	"Save Me (From Myself)"		5:29
8.	"When the Halo Slips"	Harley, Cregan	4:39
9.	"A Friend for Life"	Harley, Cregan	4:45

== Personnel ==
Steve Harley & Cockney Rebel

- Steve Harley – vocals, guitar
- Robbie Gladwell – electric guitar, acoustic guitar, backing vocals
- Barry Wickens – violin, acoustic guitar, backing vocals
- James Lascelles – keyboards
- Lincoln Anderson – bass
- Adam Houghton – drums

Additional musicians

- Kerr Nice – piano (track 2)
- Tony Ryan – pedal steel (track 7)
- Mike Batt – string quartet arrangement, piano (track 9)
- Jim Cregan – guitar solo (track 9)

Production

- Steve Harley – producer
- Jim Cregan – producer (track 9)
- Pat Grueber – recording engineer
- Matt Butler – remix engineer (all tracks), engineer (track 9)
- Steve Sale – engineer (track 9)
- Denis Blackham – mastering

Other

- Mick Rock – cover photo
- Mark Scarfe at Aarlsen – sleeve design
- Asgard – representation

== Charts ==
Chart (2006)	Peak position
Norwegian Albums (VG-lista)	40
