= A Friend for Life =

2001 song by Steve Harley

Single by Steve Harley

from the album The Quality of Mercy
- B-side: "Safe" (Live) "Loretta's Tale" (Live)
- Released: 30 April 2001
- Genre: Pop
- Length: 4:45
- Label: Intrinsic Records
- Songwriters: Jim Cregan; Steve Harley
- Producer: Jim Cregan

Steve Harley singles chronology
"Make Me Smile (Come Up and See Me) (re-issue)" (1995)	"A Friend for Life" (2001)	"The Last Goodbye" (2006)

"A Friend for Life" is a song by British singer-songwriter Steve Harley, released by Intrinsic Records on 30 April 2001 as a non-album single. The song was written by Harley and former Cockney Rebel guitarist Jim Cregan, and was produced by Cregan. Harley's first release of new material since his 1996 album Poetic Justice, "A Friend for Life" was later included on Steve Harley & Cockney Rebel's sixth studio album The Quality of Mercy (2005).

Harley originally offered "A Friend for Life" to British singer Rod Stewart in 2000. The singer declined to record the song, but later included a version on his twenty-ninth studio album Another Country (2015).

== Writing and recording ==
"A Friend for Life" was written during Harley's stay with Cregan at his home in Los Angeles during 2000. Harley wrote the song's lyrics on his return flight back to the UK. In 2015, he recalled, "I was in Los Angeles, staying at Jim's (then) house. We wrote most days and that tune came from one lazy afternoon's messing about. I wrote the entire lyric on the flight home." Later in the year, Harley recorded the song at friend and songwriter Mike Batt's home studio, with Cregan as the producer. Batt arranged and conducted the string quartet and also played keyboards on the track. The recording of "A Friend for Life" inspired Batt to record extensively at his home and most of Katie Melua's recordings have since been made there.

In a 2003 interview for the fan site The Harley Fanzone, Cregan spoke of his role as producer on the song, "We did 'A Friend for Life' together which was a real change for me because suddenly instead of Steve being the producer, I was. I thought, 'this could be strange' because he had always been the man in charge. Was he going to let go of the reins? How hard was that going to be? But it was fine – he obviously put his two cents in." In a 2003 interview, Harley called "A Friend for Life" "one of the best songs I'll ever write in my life". In a 2013 interview, he was asked which of his songs did he consider to be a "hidden gem" and one that people should listen to. He picked "A Friend for Life" and said, "It touches people of a certain age. A lot of my audience are grandparents, 50s and 60s. It touches them."

== Release ==
"A Friend for Life" was recorded during a period when Harley was seeking to record a new studio album. During 2000, he began talks with various record labels over a potential album release. In an online diary entry in September that year, Harley said, "Negotiations are taking place daily and constantly. I am determined that 'A Friend for Life' will be available in the shops and on the radio in time for the next Spring band tour, with an album, God willing, in the can." By 2001, Harley's company Comeuppance Ltd had made a licensing agreement with Intrinsic Records for the release of "A Friend for Life" as a single, but no new studio album would materialise until 2005's The Quality of Mercy.

In a January 2001 diary entry, Harley gave an update on the song's release:

"We are pretty sure that 'A Friend for Life' will be released mid-March. It should, with a little luck and the efforts of a good plugger, start getting airplay around the country towards the end of February. I can't in all honestly seriously expect a hit record. It will not be released by EMI or Sony, but by a small independent label with a good heart and much belief in the product. But airplay will help sell tickets for concerts, anyway, and to play is my first love, of course."

"A Friend for Life" was released by Intrinsic Records on CD in the UK only, with Pinnacle Records handling its distribution. The single featured two extra tracks, "Safe" and "Loretta's Tale", both being recorded live at the Bloomsbury Theatre in London in the spring of 2000. "Safe" was originally recorded for the 1996 album Poetic Justice and "Loretta's Tale" for Cockney Rebel's 1973 debut album The Human Menagerie. It was originally intended to also release a limited edition (5,000 copies) version of the single, with a 1999 re-recording of "Make Me Smile (Come Up and See Me)" as a bonus track, but this did not come to fruition.

Speaking to the Southern Daily Echo ahead of the single's release, Harley stated:

"I'm like at kid at Christmas. I don't need a hit single. It wouldn't change my life, unless it went to number one for six weeks. But I really, really want it to counterbalance 'Make Me Smile'. It's a powerful song – anyone who buys it will play it for years. Hopefully it will make the great wide world realise there is more to me than just one song and sell concert tickets, because performing live is my first love."

The song began to gain airplay in March and was released as a single in April, coinciding with Steve Harley & Cockney Rebel's 'Back with the Band' tour – a 38 date UK tour which was the band's first in four years. It reached number 125 in the UK Singles Chart in May 2001 and stayed in the top 200 for four weeks. It also reached number 45 in the UK Independent Singles Chart. Speaking of the song's commercial reception, Harley told the Swindon Evening Advertiser in 2001, "It got a lot of Radio 2 airplay and was a hair's breadth off the top 75. It's not Radio 1, times move on and it is a different sort of music."

"A Friend for Life" was later included on the Steve Harley & Cockney Rebel album The Quality of Mercy, which was released in 2005. As Harley was happy with the original recording, no changes were made to the song, although the track's producer credits were changed to both Cregan and Harley.

== Critical reception ==
In a 2005 review of Anytime! (A Live Set), Peter Makowski of Classic Rock commented, "It's the lesser-known material like the emotive 'A Friend For Life' that makes Harley sound fresh and edgy, like a latter day Libertine". In a review of The Quality of Mercy, Nick Dalton of Record Collector described the song as "reflective" and noted Cregan's "delicate solo". The Sunday Express commented, "A genuine Seventies pop maverick, Harley has evolved into a highly-literate and intimate balladeer. 'The Coast of Amalfi' and 'A Friend for Life' are elegant if care-worn gems." Carol Clerk of Classic Rock noted the song's "lovely, gentle melod[y]". Nick Hasted of Uncut was critical of the album, but added that "A Friend for Life" "retains some brutal Cockney bite about married stasis".

== Live performances ==
"A Friend for Life" was included in the set-list of the band's 2001 tour and remained a regular inclusion at Harley's live shows until his death. Some live versions have been recorded for official releases, including Acoustic and Pure: Live (2003), Anytime! (A Live Set) (2004) and Live at the Isle of Wight Festival (2005).

In 2011, Harley performed the song live with Cockney Rebel members Barry Wickens and James Lascelles alongside the "Herreavdelingen" radio show's orchestra at the NRK Marienlyst in Oslo, Norway. Harley also performed the song as a bonus session track that year for the BBC Radio 2 Bob Harris show Old Grey Whistle Test 40, which was released on the box-set compilation The Old Grey Whistle Test Live.

== Track listing ==
CD single

1. "A Friend for Life" – 4:45
2. "Safe" (Live) – 4:08
3. "Loretta's Tale" (Live) – 6:35

== Personnel ==
"A Friend for Life"

- Steve Harley – vocals, bass
- Jim Cregan – guitar, producer
- Robbie Gladwell – guitar
- Mike Batt – piano, arranger and conductor of String Quartet
- Matt Butler – recording and mixing engineer
- Steve Sale – assistant recording and mixing engineer

"Safe" (Live)

- Steve Harley – vocals
- Robbie Gladwell – guitar
- Lily Gonzales – backing vocals

"Loretta's Tale" (Live)

- Steve Harley – vocals
- Robbie Gladwell – guitar

Other

- Kitrocket UK – sleeve
- Doug Shearer – mastering

== Charts ==
Chart (2001)	Peak position
UK Independent Singles Chart (OCC)	45
UK Singles Chart (OCC)	125

== Rod Stewart version ==
"A Friend for Life"

Song by Rod Stewart

from the album Another Country
- Released: 23 October 2015
- Length: 4:42
- Label: Capitol
- Songwriters: Steve Harley, Jim Cregan
- Producers: Rod Stewart, Kevin Savigar

In 2005, British singer Rod Stewart released a version of "A Friend for Life" on his twenty-ninth studio album Another Country. As a friend of his for many years, Stewart has described Harley as "one of the finest lyricists the UK has ever produced".

Shortly after the song was written in 2000, Harley offered the song to Stewart. Harley revealed in a November 2000 diary entry, "Gave 'A Friend for Life' to Rod Stewart at dinner the other night. He loves the song but said: 'I don't like that line about 'The cats, I'll feed yer cats...' I'll be releasing my version in the new year, but I am not averse to a world-superstar having a world-wide number one with the song. No matter."

After Stewart recorded the song for Another Country, Harley revealed in a June 2015 diary entry that an "international superstar" had recorded one of his songs. He added, "I believe totally that you will love it. I have it (the superstar sent me a file by email) and it is, for me, a beautiful reading of a slightly complex lyric. That's why the superstar is a superstar, I guess." Stewart's version of the song was first played on BBC Radio 2 on 31 August, when Stewart appeared on the "Johnnie Walker Meets..." show. During the show, Stewart said Harley was "over the moon" about Stewart covering the song and added that he is "one of the most underrated songwriters".

In an October 2015 interview with Classic Rock, Harley commented on Stewart's version, "Was I happy with that? Just a bit! Rod really nails it in his old soul voice." Speaking to The Leader in November 2016, Harley spoke again of Stewart's version, "I offered it to him over 10 years ago and he didn't get it, but now he's had these two lovely boys with Penny Lancaster and he gets it because it's a difficult lyric about children growing up and leaving the nest. I thanked him by buying him a fish supper in a very expensive restaurant in Mayfair."
