= Stripped to the Bare Bones =

Live album by Steve Harley
- Released: 19 April 1999
- Genre: Pop rock
- Length: 73:56
- Label: Burning Airlines (NMC Ltd.)
- Producer: Steve Harley

Steve Harley chronology
The Cream of Steve Harley & Cockney Rebel (1999)	Stripped to the Bare Bones (1999)	Acoustic and Pure: Live (2003)

Alternative Cover
- 2000 re-issue "Unplugged"

Stripped to the Bare Bones is a live acoustic album by English musician and songwriter Steve Harley, released by Burning Airlines on 19 April 1999. The album features Harley performing with guitarist and violinist Nick Pynn.

== Background ==
Having returned to touring as Steve Harley & Cockney Rebel in 1989, Harley and his band would continue to tour throughout the 1990s. Although Harley had performed a small number of one-off acoustic-based shows during that time, his first acoustic tour would be the "Stripped to the Bare Bones" tour of 1998. In August 1997, Harley performed a string of casual, more acoustic-based, shows at the Edinburgh Fringe Festival. Accompanied by Cockney Rebel violinist/guitarist Nick Pynn, these shows consisted of music and chat about Harley's career. In November, he also performed an acoustic show at Castlemilk Festival in Glasgow. In the liner notes of Stripped to the Bare Bones, Harley revealed:

"I was invited to do an acoustic show; it wasn't my idea. It all started with the Castlemilk Festival which is basically a week-long folk festival in Glasgow, and they called my agent and asked if I would come and play an acoustic show. I thought about it and decided to take a chance. I really enjoyed it and got a taste for it."

The success of these shows led to Harley and Pynn playing over a hundred dates in 1998 as part of the "Stripped to the Bare Bones" tour. This tour included fifty-four concerts in the UK alone, while around ninety songs were rehearsed for use on the tour. Coinciding with the tour was the release of the new compilation album More Than Somewhat – The Very Best of Steve Harley. Harley commented:

"Your songs are what they are. When I write, 90% are with the piano or guitar with the prerequisite that they stand on their own two feet - maybe not those on Prima Donna which were production numbers - but most others which meant I could get up with an acoustic guitar and sing my songs. That's why the tour was called 'Stripped to the Bare Bones'. We play for 2 and a half hours most nights, about 24/25 titles out of 90 odd we have rehearsed. I've tried a lot of combinations. A lot of songs get one go and you know instantly if they work, and it's best to try them all in public but audiences vary across the country of course. So, sometimes I give them two airings."

In March 1998, as part of the tour, Harley and Pynn played at The Jazz Café in London. This show was recorded using Sensible Music Ltd. and an ADAT system for possible release as a live album. During the show, Harley played acoustic guitar and harmonica, while Pynn played acoustic lead guitar, dulcimer, mandocello and violin. Speaking of playing with Pynn, Harley commented: "It's a privilege to play with a musician of his calibre."

In April 1999, Stripped to the Bare Bones was released on the Burning Airlines label. The album featured fourteen live unplugged tracks from the show, one of which was a new song presented on the 1998 tour, "Only You". The same recording of it later appeared on the compilation The Cockney Rebel – A Steve Harley Anthology (2006) and a studio version was recorded for Harley's sixth solo album, Uncovered (2020).

After the success of these shows, Harley would continue performing in the two-man acoustic format in 1999 and 2000, though with Cockney Rebel guitarist Robbie Gladwell rather than Nick Pynn. As Harley continued performing these shows, Steve Harley & Cockney Rebel would not embark on a full tour until the "Back with the Band" UK tour of 2001, though would play a one-off rock band show at Blackheath Halls in November 2000, a concert that many (including Harley) have lauded as one of his best ever. As the first acoustic album from Harley, two others would follow: Acoustic and Pure: Live in 2002, and Anytime! (A Live Set) in 2004.

Years later, Harley would eventually plan to revive the two-man acoustic format (with Barry Wickens rather than Gladwell or Pynn) pending an "Audience With..." tour running over 67 dates from April to November 2024. However, as a result of Harley's March 2024 death, this tour never materialised.

== Release ==
The album was released in the UK by Burning Airlines (NMC Ltd.). In 2000, it was reissued under a new title Unplugged by the budget compilation label Brilliant, which is run by Digimode Entertainment Ltd. The re-issue features the same track-listing as Stripped to the Bare Bones, but has different artwork. Although Stripped to the Bare Bones is now out of print, Unplugged remains in print to date.

== Critical reception ==
Professional ratings
Review scores
Source	Rating
AllMusic (Stripped to Bare Bones)	3/5 stars
AllMusic (Unplugged)	3.5/5 stars
The Birmingham Post	4/5 stars
Daily Express	5/5 stars

On its release, James O'Brien of the Daily Express considered Stripped to Bare Bones to be "artistically and historically valid". He continued, "The real charm of live music – rawness, realism and dependence upon pure talent – is lost on a generation weaned on samplers, sequencers and Steps. This gloriously unpretentious career retrospective will redress the most skewed balance." Simon Evans of The Birmingham Post praised it as a live album that "finds Harley in fine form". He stated, "'Mr Soft and 'Make Me Smile' are among the back catalogue numbers getting an acoustic makeover which works surprisingly well in both cases, and even the mini-epics 'Tumbling Down' and 'Sebastian' benefit from a more low-key approach. Fans will also delight in the presence of 'My Only Vice' and 'The Best Years of Our Lives', as well as a smattering of more recent material that stands up well in such august company."

Stephen Thomas Erlewine of AllMusic commented, "[This] album happens to be proof that Harley was a solid song-craftsman and a fine performer, more than just a glam has-been. His relaxed yet energetic performances and ease at storytelling make it a highly entertaining album, even for listeners who aren't familiar with his body of work." Dave Thompson of AllMusic reviewed the album's reissue as Unplugged. He stated, "Harley's contribution to the 'unplugged' bandwagon stands as one of the best. Harley is a most engaging host, punctuating songs with humor and anecdote, and if he does push the 'gee, it's really great to be here' sincerity button a little too often for comfort, then that goes with the territory as well. A quarter of a century had passed since he was last considered a commercial force, yet his audience is as devotedly die-hard as ever, and the songs have held up remarkably well too."

== Track listing ==
All tracks are written by Steve Harley.

No.	Title	Length
1.	"My Only Vice (Is the Fantastic Prices I Charge for Being Eaten Alive)"	2:41
2.	"Star for a Week (Dino)"	5:07
3.	"The Best Years of Our Lives"	9:33
4.	"Judy Teen"	3:08
5.	"The Last Time I Saw You"	5:21
6.	"Mr. Soft"	3:17
7.	"(Love) Compared with You"	5:39
8.	"Tumbling Down"	6:28
9.	"Only You"	5:11
10.	"Bed in the Corner"	3:20
11.	"Sling It!"	3:46
12.	"Riding the Waves (For Virginia Woolf)"	6:30
13.	"Sebastian"	8:32
14.	"Make Me Smile (Come Up and See Me)"	5:16

== Personnel ==
- Steve Harley – vocals, acoustic guitar, harmonica, compiler
- Nick Pynn – acoustic lead guitar, dulcimer, mando-cello, violin

Production

- Kevin Whooley – engineer
- Carlton P. Sandercock-Rout – project concept for NMC Ltd., compiler
- Patrick Bird – mixing, mastering for Sound Discs Ltd.

Other

- Andy Abbott – centre photograph (courtesy of The East Anglian Daily Times)
- G.D. Young – cover photograph, inside photography
- S. Raulfs, Ann Meuer – inside photography
- Becky Stewart – design, layout
