= Live at the Isle of Wight Festival (Steve Harley & Cockney Rebel video) =

Video by Steve Harley & Cockney Rebel
- Released: 23 May 2005
- Recorded: 2004
- Genre: Concert Performance Video
- Length: 100 minutes (total running time)
- Label: Direct Video Distribution Limited
- Director: Matt Askem
- Producer: Celia Blaker

Steve Harley & Cockney Rebel chronology
| The Come Back, All is Forgiven Tour: Live (1989) | Live at the Isle of Wight Festival (2005) | Birmingham (Live with Orchestra & Choir) (2013) |

Live at the Isle of Wight Festival is a live concert video by the British rock band Steve Harley & Cockney Rebel, filmed at the 2004 Isle of Wight Festival, and released on DVD on 23 May 2005. It is the band's third filmed concert release.

== Background ==
During the summer of 2003, promoter John Giddings offered Steve Harley & Cockney Rebel a slot for the following year's Isle of Wight Festival. An agreement was reached, with the band confirmed to play on the second day of the festival. In a 16 June 2004 diary entry for his official website, Harley spoke of the band's performance:

"I waited a little apprehensively for the Isle of Wight. I cannot explain it. John Giddings is an old mate. I wanted nothing in the world than to deliver for John on his festival island. The sun shone and we shone; we glowed; we kicked a 45-minute set off in the style of a truly compatible travelling rock band. On stage we felt tingly; I kid you not. The smiles on those big screens were genuine. And I saw the respect in their applause and in their waves."

The band's performance was well received. Immediately after the festival, Cockney Rebel fans expressed interest in having the performance released as a DVD. This led Harley to approach the production company CC-Lab about purchasing the rights to the footage. Harley noted in his June 2004 diary: "It won't be cheap - the full 47-minute performance for sale, commercially, on DVD. It's what I want, and, as usual, it's likely to go that way. But don't hold me to it. It will take a little time, a little negotiation, and a lot of courage." The initial aim was to get the DVD released in time to be sold on the band's UK autumn tour.

Although the release date was postponed, negotiations were completed during the autumn and the festival footage, which was filmed using nine cameras, was then edited. Harley announced in November 2004 that the DVD was likely to be ready for sale in February 2005, to coincide with the 30th anniversary of the band's 1975 UK number one song "Make Me Smile (Come Up and See Me)". Plans were also made to add some further material to the DVD using footage of the band at a concert in Edinburgh during December. Harley revealed: "I've got a crew coming to Edinburgh to film an extra 40-minutes: get-in, set-up, soundcheck, backstage, Green room, dressing-rooms, chats with musicians/crew etc. Even a vox pop where the film crew will go outside, microphone in hand, and chat to the queue." In the end, a three-man crew recorded eight hours of footage.

In February 2005, it was announced that the DVD was to be released in May, and would be followed by a new single release - a re-recorded version of "Make Me Smile" - in June. By April, Harley had numerous interviews lined up to promote the DVD's release. He had completed approximately twenty-five by the end of May. The DVD was released across Europe in May 2005 by Direct Video Distribution.

== Features ==
The Isle of Wight footage, lasting 46 minutes in total, is made up of eight songs. The bonus footage lasts 48 minutes.

The first part of the bonus features is a 21-minute behind-the-scenes documentary at the Edinburgh Queen's Hall on 7 December 2004. It is shown as a five-hour countdown to the band's concert there and features interviews with band members, crew, and some members of the audience. The second feature is an 18-minute interview with Harley, which was conducted by his publicist Wendy Bailey. The interview is notable for Harley's revealing of the meaning behind his 1973 song "Death Trip". The final feature is a near 13-minute performance of "Death Trip", performed at Edinburgh. The song was reintroduced into the set-list for the November–December 2004 tour after an approximate 30-year absence.

== Critical reception ==
Professional ratings
Review scores
| Source | Rating |
|---|---|
| VistaVideo | 5/10 stars |
| Record Collector | 3/5 stars |

Upon its release, Ian Templeton of Record Collector stated: "On a gorgeous sunny day, the set starts with Harley's well-known classic, 'Here Comes the Sun'. The band are clearly having a ball and belt it out for all their worth. Certain elements of the crowd are clearly waiting for The Who, but Harley's pretty successful in winning over most punters. The 50-minute set ends with the obligatory 'Make Me Smile'. The 'extras' are reasonably interesting. The common theme [of the interviews] being what a thoroughly nice guy Mr Harley is. There's also a stand-alone interview with the man himself and a live rendition of 'Death Trip'. Bit of a dirge if you ask me, but the fans seem to love it."

Paul Higson of VistaVideo said: "In the supporting material there is a performance of the rarely heard 'Death Trip' at the Queen's Hall, Edinburgh. Unlike some of the Isle of Wight songs it is a number designed to be magically epic and so it is. Harley and the band sound great, the night, the blue lights, the walls, the professionalism, all suggest that this is what it is normally like at a Cockney Rebel concert. Going to DVD with a concert because of the history and the footage is not necessarily the most rewarding gig you can sell to us. They should have ditched it and given us the cosier affair at Queen's Hall in its entirety instead. It would have clearly been far more impressive."

== Track listing ==
| No. | Title | Writer(s) | Length |
|---|---|---|---|
| 1. | "Here Comes the Sun" | George Harrison |
| 2. | "Mr. Soft" | Steve Harley |
| 3. | "Judy Teen" | Harley |
| 4. | "Sling It!" | Harley |
| 5. | "A Friend for Life" | Harley, Jim Cregan |
| 6. | "Riding the Waves" | Harley |
| 7. | "Sebastian" | Harley |
| 8. | "Make Me Smile (Come Up and See Me)" | Harley |
| 9. | "Death Trip (Bonus Track)" | Harley |

== Personnel ==
Steve Harley & Cockney Rebel

- Steve Harley – lead vocals, guitar
- Robbie Gladwell – electric guitar, backing vocals
- Barry Wickens – violin, guitar, backing vocals
- James Lascelles – keyboard, percussion
- Lincoln Anderson – bass
- Adam Houghton – drums
- Stuart Elliott – percussion on "Death Trip" (bonus track)

Selected concert crew and video production team

- Andy Linklater – 'live' concert sound engineer
- Paul Myers, Ewan Hill – on-stage monitor engineers
- Swapan Nandi, Dave Hornby – backline
- Vince Foster – lighting director
- Pete Hughes – FOH Sound
- Karen Craig – assistant producer
- Ben Frewin – camera supervisor
- Mike Callan, John Clarke, Curtis Dunne, Dave Evans, Nat Hill, Harriet Sheard
  James Ramsay, Kevin French, Bret Turnbull, Steve Tickner, Saria Ofogba, John Shrimpton – camera operators
- Ken Ashleigh Johnson – key grip
- Zoe Fawcett Eustace – sound unit coordinator
- Will Shapland – sound supervisor
- Craig Williams – vision supervisor
- Rod Wardell – vision mixer
- Delilah Seale, Helen Neale, Anuja Manoharan, Ella Cosby, Midge Baker-Jones – production
- MJ Morgan – line producer
- Tim Thompsett – editor
- Jason Hocking, Justin Rees – executive producers
- Celia Blaker – producer
- Matt Askem – director
