= Ordinary People (Steve Harley song) =

2015 song by Steve Harley

Single by Steve Harley
- Released: 25 September 2015
- Recorded: June 2015
- Studio: Shrubbery Studio, Suffolk
- Genre: Pop rock
- Length: 3:59
- Label: Comeuppance
- Songwriter(s): Steve Harley; Jim Cregan; Robert Hart
- Producer(s): Steve Harley

Steve Harley singles chronology
"For Sale. Baby Shoes. Never Worn" (2010)	"Ordinary People" (2015)	"I've Just Seen a Face" (2020)

"Ordinary People" is a song by English singer-songwriter Steve Harley, released by Comeuppance as a non-album single on 25 September 2015. It was written by Harley, Jim Cregan and Robert Hart, and produced by Harley. The song was Harley's first new song of five years, following the release of his fifth solo studio album Stranger Comes to Town in 2010.

== Background ==
"Ordinary People" was originally written and performed by Jim Cregan and Robert Hart as a demoed track, who handed the recording to Harley in 2010. Although Harley did nothing with the song for four years, in 2014, he gained the support of Cregan and Hart to develop the song further. The song, in an early incarnation, was first performed live by Steve Harley & Cockney Rebel during their Autumn/Winter 2014 tour at the York Barbican on 13 December. During this airing, Harley revealed the song was a "work in progress". The next performance of the song live was at Hull City Hall on 26 February 2015. In an online diary entry, dated 13 January, Harley noted: "Next show: Hull City Hall – complete with new song. Well, the same new song we played at York Barbican, but with a twist. I said it was a work in progress, and now it has a separate section, a middle eight."

In June 2015, Harley spent several days in the Shrubbery Studio at Bury St Edmunds, Suffolk, recording "Ordinary People". Harley used his touring band Cockney Rebel to record the song, while the studio's owner Richard Clark engineered it. The song was bassist Marty Prior's debut performance on a Steve Harley song, having joined the band in 2014. During the sessions, assistant engineer George Perks had posted a photograph to his official website, and announced: "Honoured to be in the Shrubbery studio this month with Steve Harley & Cockney Rebel, assisting the recording of "Ordinary People". The new single sounds great, and has been sent over to producer extraordinaire Matt Butler for mixing. I'm really excited to hear the final mix! Stay tuned...!" It was announced that month that the song would be released as a single nearer the time of the upcoming The Best Years of Our Lives tour in November. Harley hoped that the song would gain airplay on UK radio and act as a publicity boost for the tour.

In Harley's online diary entry for 22 June, he wrote: "We spent a few days in a recording studio recently, and "Ordinary People" came out sounding like a potential R2 play-lister... if only! I've added an extra 12 bars of new melody and lyric (a Middle 8, which is actually 12)." It was also revealed that the digital recording files had been sent via Ethernet to Matt Butler, who would re-mix the song using Pro-tools. The single's release was first announced outside of the official website in the Southend Echo on 15 July, with the article noting that the single was still in the process of being remixed and prepared for release at that time.

During an interview on the BBC Radio 2 show Steve Wright in the Afternoon, in November 2015, Harley explained how the song was developed:

"The tune was sent to me by my dear friend Jim Cregan, and he wrote the tune with Robert Hart, a great singer. So Robert and Jim sent me a demo of that five years ago, and for five years the MP3 file was sitting on the desktop of my computer. And I've looked at this thing, and played it twice a year for five years, and said 'I like that, I like that, but it's not finished'. So I called Jim and Robert and said 'Can I finish this for you? I need about 30 more per cent, a new tune, a new part and new lyrics', and they went 'Get on with it, it's too old for us now'. So I finished it and recorded it."

In an interview with Phoenix FM, backstage at the Brentwood Music Festival in July 2015, Harley also spoke of the song's development:

"Well it's a song, a good song. It started life written by Jim Cregan and Robert Hart, and they gave it to me five years ago. And I sat on it, it's been sitting on my computer for five years, and I hear it now and again and think I really like this song. Then I said to Jim and Robert, look, you know, it needs extra, it needs a middle eight, the new section, and are you in for giving me a free hand. Because it's like, well, they've had a song for five/six years that hasn't done anything, so it's not earning them anything. So they're quite happy for someone like me to come along and say I'm gonna make some alterations for a bit of the publishing, obviously it's business. But I mean they just said get on with it, so I made some changes and I've made a record of it. And we're really pleased with it. We're going to play it today in the set."

The song has been described by Harley as "Beatle-esque". Speaking to Classic Rock in October 2015, Harley revealed: "It's a cri de coeur – I'm speaking for the little man, as it were. It's not John Lennon, but as I get older I'm not ashamed to wear my heart on my sleeve." Speaking of the song's chances of getting airplay on BBC Radio 2, he added: "The new single from Cliff Richard is on the A-list, and they play David Gilmour, but it's tough. I'd love it if Radio 2 played my single – half the world and its grandmother thinks I only wrote one song. If it had the right name stuck to it I think they would play it."

Speaking to the East Anglian Daily Times in November 2015, Harley spoke of the song and its release:

"I've got a single out that we're really pleased with and might well get some good airplay with, but I'm only pressing 150 copies to give to local radio. The national radio, everywhere else, you send them a memory stick or MP3. We've played it at four festivals this year and it's proving popular so my hopes are quite high – although I'm pretty long in the tooth, I'm not young and hip, so it's pretty hard to get on the A or B list of Radio 2, which is what I need. It's tough. I've a new single out, a big tour that will probably sell out, so no, I'm not complacent, but I have my place. I've got my audience and I don't want to lose them, it's even increasing somewhat with airplay."

== Release ==
"Ordinary People" was made available as a pre-order digital single on 5 September 2015. It was released on 25 September. The song was not given a full commercial release on any physical format. The single's artwork features a close-up photograph of Harley, taken by Mike Callow.

A promotional one-track CD release of the single was later issued with an "impact" date of 27 November, specifically for radio station use. As an exclusive for radio, the promotional CD features a "Radio Edit" version of the song, which has a shortened introduction and first verse, and is approximately 20 seconds shorter than the full version. The CD features the same artwork as the digital version for a picture sleeve, housed in a plastic wallet, with a record company information sticker placed on the rear side. The physical format release was limited to 150 copies, and was issued by Comeuppance Ltd and promoted by All About Promotions.

The song was given its first play on 3 October, on BBC Radio Scotland's Billy Sloan Show. On 8 October, it received its first play on the Norwegian Oslo Radio, and on 21 October, it had its first BBC Radio 2 airing on Vanessa Feltz's show, followed with a play on Steve Wright in the Afternoon on 9 November.

The song was performed on Steve Harley & Cockney Rebel's 16-date UK tour in November 2015, which celebrated the 40th anniversary of The Best Years of Our Lives album and "Make Me Smile". On 7 November 2015, an official video of the song being performed live on the tour was uploaded onto YouTube.

== Critical reception ==
Upon its release, Andrew Thomas of the Westmorland Gazette reviewed "Ordinary People", describing it as "deceptively simple" and "of the type that you need years of experience to pull off so well". He commented on the "Beatles/George Harrison feel", Harley's "rich and assured vocals" and the "straightforward but heartfelt lyrics - a plea for ordinary people to band together and show their essential humanity to try to make the world a better place". He concluded "Ordinary People" was "a very mature song which grows on you with each listen".

Reviewing the band's November 2015 concert at Scunthorpe Baths Hall, Scunthorpe Telegraph noted the song's inclusion within the set-list, commenting how "at the age of 64, Steve is still making great music". Another similar review on the band's Liverpool Philharmonic show, for the Wirral Globe, saw reporter Peter Grant comment: "We were treated to "Ordinary People" – Steve's new single which is, he says, unashamedly Beatle-esque".

When giving the song its first play on BBC Radio Scotland, Billy Sloan commented: "There's a brand new song which I think really is a fantastic piece of work, and I hope you agree. One of Steve Harley's best vocals in a long-long time, and that really is saying something when you consider his incredible back-catalogue". After playing the song on his BBC Radio 2 show, presenter Steve Wright commented that the song was "highly familiar", and that it "really does sound like a song I've heard before". After being played on Oslo Radio, the song received positive feedback from listeners.

== Track listing ==
Digital single

1. "Ordinary People" – 3:59

Promotional CD single (UK)

1. "Ordinary People" (Radio Edit) – 3:37

== Personnel ==
- Steve Harley – lead vocal, acoustic guitar
- Barry Wickens – violin, acoustic guitar, backing vocals
- Robbie Gladwell – guitar, acoustic guitar, backing vocals
- James Lascelles – piano, organ, percussion, backing vocals
- Marty Prior – bass guitar
- Adam Houghton – drums

Production

- Steve Harley – producer
- Richard Clark – engineer
- George Perks – assistant engineer
- Matt Butler – remixing on Pro-tools

Other

- Mike Callow – photography
