= Stranger Comes to Town =

Studio album by Steve Harley
- Released: 3 May 2010
- Genre: Rock, pop rock
- Length: 49:46
- Label: Absolute (UK); Repertoire Records (Europe)
- Producer: Steve Harley

Steve Harley chronology
The Cockney Rebel - A Steve Harley Anthology (2006)	Stranger Comes to Town (2010)	Cavaliers: An Anthology 1973-1974 (2012)

Singles from Stranger Comes to Town
- 1. "Faith & Virtue" Released: 2 May 2010; 2. "For Sale. Baby Shoes. Never Worn" Released: 27 June 2010

Stranger Comes to Town is the fifth solo studio album from English songwriter and musician Steve Harley, released by Absolute on 3 May 2010. The album was produced by Harley.

== Background ==
Harley has described Stranger Comes to Town as "a sort-of protest album" and "a state-of-the-nation report". He told The York Press in 2010, "I'm not a grumpy old man but what's happening to this country? I don't like the dumbing-down from the moment our Prime Minister said 'Call me Tony'. I've been angry ever since. Kids are growing up in a world where there's no deference. What was wrong with 'sir' or 'madam'? The album is a new-fashioned protest album. It's not Blowin' in the Wind or 'Masters of War', but deep down, what are we coming to?" He added to The Bolton News, "I'm sick of the greedy people running the country and the fact that everything is being dumbed down."

Speaking to Classic Rock in 2010, Harley also commented on the album's theme, "The essence of the stories on this album is the 'Stranger' bit. That's the mystery. It's a metaphor, an allegory for modern life and invasions of privacy and all the things that have entered into the Western world and ruined it."

Describing the album as a "true labour of love", as well as being "hard work", Harley described the album's development and style to Acoustic, "I've reverted to the type where you've got rather simple acoustic tunes, but with poetical lyrics and mysterious stories mixed in with the more bizarre production kind of things. I've come back to the young man that set out in the early '70s with a lot of ambition and no inhibitions. In the studio I got into my own mindset. I was just having fun in the studio." He added to The York Press, "I've had five years of ripping my own ears off. It really doesn't get any easier. It's not the tune that's difficult, it's the words that are a struggle – and like John Lennon said, 'it's not about filler words'. You never rest as a songwriter. You're always looking for the muse to come and sit on your shoulder, and I can't take the stress. Well, every five years, I can... though this might be the last one. I've so much to say on this album."

Speaking of the album's title, Harley stated it referred to "a man who feels estranged from what is going on around him". He added to The York Press: "I borrowed it. When I was up in Norfolk we went to a village pub to get the stress off with a pint of Guinness, and we heard these two people say 'Stranger Comes to Town'. They asked, 'What are you doing here, Steve?', so I gave them a line from Eccles in The Goons: 'Everyone has to be somewhere'."

== Recording ==
Harley and his band Cockney Rebel spent a month recording Stranger Comes to Town at Leeders Farm Residential Studios, Norfolk, in September and October 2009. Harley booked the studio months beforehand, back in March 2009, and revealed in a diary entry at the time, "The notes are there, in notebooks and on scraps of mini-disc. Tunes and couplets, simple rhymes and deeper thoughts all jumbled, randomly acquired and noted over the past few years. There is only one way I will collate it all into coherent songs, and that is by booking a recording studio."

Harley would typically spend 12 or more hours a day working on the album at Leeders Farm. The band spent most mornings rehearsing around the studio's kitchen table. Due to other professional commitments, guitarist Robbie Gladwell was absent for much of the recording, leaving Barry Wickens to cover the electric guitar parts on half of the album.

Speaking of the sessions in a 5 October diary entry, Harley revealed,

"Slightly shattered. Ten tracks recorded, some sung, others waiting for lyrics. It's like jet-lag. Coming down from the mad rushes of adrenalin that go with the producing/recording process. Been living-in at a residential recording studio. Odd to get up and share breakfast with the band. Odd, too, to share the dinner table each night, but they are all decent blokes and easy to get along with. I'm the one with the swimming head, tunes and words, production plans all juggled at the same time, so I'm the distant one over the boiled eggs and soldiers."

By the end of October, nine songs were nearing completion and the remainder of the year saw Harley spend more time in the studio to finish the album, including recording vocals and mixing the tracks. In a November diary entry, he revealed, "Got 10 new songs. Three of them are co-written with various guys. Tunes only. Not words. Only wish any one of them had a literary bent, too. The lyrics have been the toughest part, as usual."

By the end of the 2009, Stranger Comes to Town was almost complete, except for the remixing of a couple of songs, as well as the choosing of the album's running order. Harley described some tracks on the album as "acoustic, almost entirely live" and others as "bigger productions". With the finishing touches completed in January 2010, the album was mastered in February by Denis Blackham at Skye Mastering.

== Song information ==
"Take the Men & the Horses Away" is an anti-war song which speaks of the UK's involvement in the Afghanistan and Iraq Wars. Harley wrote the chorus several years before the rest of the song was completed. During sessions for Stranger Comes to Town, Harley played the chorus to the band and the song was then developed into a full track, with four members of Cockney Rebel receiving co-writing credits. "This Old Man" was written about Harley's father. Before the album's release, the song was previewed to fans in November 2009 when Harley uploaded a short piece of footage to his website which showed the band rehearsing it in the studio.

"True Love Will Find You in the End" is a cover of a 1984 song by American singer-songwriter Daniel Johnston which appeared on his Retired Boxer album. Harley recorded the song after using his website forum in 2009 to invite fans to forward their ideas of a song which could be covered for the new album. Graeme Blake suggested Johnston's "Story of an Artist" and Harley commented in a diary entry in November 2009, "The pointer towards Daniel Johnston by Graeme is indeed welcome. Had all but forgotten the self-proclaimed 'rejected unknown'. Maybe too many have covered the beautiful, poignant 'Story of an Artist' – irresistible, as it is – for me to attack it so late in its life. Maybe. But 'True Love Will Find You In The End' is less exposed. Maybe that one." The song was the last to be recorded for the album in December 2009. On 9 March 2010, Harley performed the song with Jools Holland and his band for Holland's show on BBC Radio 2, which was broadcast the following month.

"No Bleeding Hearts" features Harley's son, Kerr Nice, on the piano. The idea of Nice performing on the track was suggested by the band's keyboardist James Lascelles after Nice arrived for an overnight stay at the studio. In 2009, Harley said about the song, "The song may seem mysterious on first listen, but I'm quietly hoping that those who have now heard it twice, some even three times on this tour, will have started to form some interpretation." He revealed the song's inspiration in 2020, "There are disused diamond mines in South Africa, slaves spend 9 months down there in the dark, little food; poor money but they are desperate. Google the story, and you'll get 'No Bleeding Hearts'. Without faith, no survival." In 2010, Harley told Acoustic that he felt that the song sounded like the early Cockney Rebel and "could be very much my modern day 'Sebastian'".

"Blinded with Tears" was written around 2000 with ex-Cockney Rebel guitarist Jim Cregan. It was originally described by Harley as a "slow, backbeat drama" in a September 2000 diary entry. In October 2004, Harley published part of the song's lyrics in a diary entry, with the working title "Alone in the End". "2,000 Years from Now" features six 10–11-year-old children from Spooner Row Primary School in Wymondham providing backing vocals. The addition to the track was a last-minute decision, with Harley revealing to BBC News in 2010, "It's fantastic. We had a really good time – they worked very hard and picked it up so quickly. I'd almost finished this track and I said to my engineer, 'There's a primary school down the road isn't there, I'd like some school kids on this track because the lyric is about the future of the planet'. Three hours later they were all here and two hours later we'd done it."

== Release ==
"Stranger Comes to Town" was released on CD on 3 May 2010 by Absolute (via Universal) in the UK and by Repertoire Records in Europe under license by Harley's own Comeuppance Ltd. The album reached number 187 in the UK Albums Chart and number 20 in the UK Independent Albums Chart. The album's lead single, "Faith & Virtue", was released on 2 May 2010, and a second single, "For Sale. Baby Shoes. Never Worn", was released on 27 June 2010.

Harley originally intended to follow-up the 2005 release of the Steve Harley & Cockney Rebel album The Quality of Mercy with a new studio album in 2008. After The Quality of Mercy, Harley continued writing new material and recording demos, and in January 2007 he and his band entered the recording studio, at which time plans were announced for a possible new album release in spring 2008. The album was given the working title Wide Screen, with an alternative being The Road Home. Although Harley continued writing, the proposed album did not come to fruition due to contractual issues that were left unresolved until early 2009. In a diary entry from March 2009, Harley revealed, "Finally wrapped up a contract wrangle which has kept me sometimes awake and regularly disturbed for almost three years. Cost me a great deal in all sorts of energies and resources to end this loathsome arrangement, but I knew in my heart I had to sort it."

== Artwork ==
The photograph used for the album's front cover was taken at Crosby Beach in Merseyside, England, in June 2009 and shows Harley standing near to one of Antony Gormley's Another Place sculptures. At the time, Harley was staying at a hotel in Southport and took a walk along the beach to see the statues. He asked a passerby to take a photograph of him with one of them using Harley's own camera. After it was decided to use the photograph for the album, the photographer was given credit in the liner notes as "the Stranger on the Beach". The blonde-haired female model seen with her back to the camera was superimposed into the photograph and is the wife of photographer Mike Callow.

== Tour ==
To promote the album, Steve Harley and Cockney Rebel embarked on a UK-based tour in late May, which included performances at the Isle of Wight and Glastonbury Festivals. The tour continued into June and also included a few concerts in Norway and one in Denmark. Later in October, the band toured Europe.

== Critical reception ==
Professional ratings
Review scores
Source	Rating
Record Collector	3/5 stars
Daily Express	3/5 stars

On its release, Terry Staunton of Record Collector felt Stranger Comes to Town had "little of the arch art rock of Cockney Rebel" but added "the lyrical adventure of old survives". He added, "It's sturdy, timeless singer-songwriter fare, Harley's acoustic guitar front and centre, caressing his still mannered vocal, embellished by piano and violin." Simon Gage of the Daily Express concluded, "The music is simple, raw and thoughtful but the likeability is still there and the songs interesting. It won't do what 'Make Me Smile' did for him but it's an album he must be proud of." Andrew Thomas of the Lancashire Telegraph described the album as "a striking set with three or four standout tracks" and "a welcome album from an innovative writer and performer". Martin Hutchinson of The Bolton News felt the album was "Harley at his very best" and praised it for being "lyrically insightful" and "musically magnificent". He added, "Harley's anger and emotion comes across in the lyrics of the new songs."

== Track listing ==
No.	Title	Writer(s)	Length
1.	"Faith & Virtue"	Steve Harley, Barry Wickens	4:50
2.	"Take the Men & the Horses Away"	Lincoln Anderson, Stuart Elliot, Harley, James Lascelles, Wickens	4:11
3.	"For Sale. Baby Shoes. Never Worn."	Harley	5:00
4.	"Stranger Comes to Town"	Harley	4:10
5.	"This Old Man"	Harley	5:27
6.	"True Love Will Find You in the End"	Daniel Johnston	3:46
7.	"No Bleeding Hearts"	Harley	7:05
8.	"Blinded with Tears"	Jim Cregan, Harley	5:02
9.	"Before They Crash the Universe"	Harley	4:30
10.	"2,000 Years from Now"	Robbie Gladwell, Harley	5:39

== Personnel ==
Musicians

- Steve Harley – vocals (all tracks), acoustic guitar (tracks 1, 3, 6–9)
- Barry Wickens – violin (tracks 1, 3–7, 10), viola (tracks 1, 3–4, 10), electric guitar (tracks 1–2, 7–9), acoustic guitar (tracks 6, 10), backing vocals (tracks 1–2, 6, 8, 10)
- Robbie Gladwell – arpeggio guitar parts (track 7), electric guitar (tracks 8, 10), 12 string acoustic guitar (track 10), backing vocals (tracks 1–2, 8, 10)
- James Lascelles – keyboards (track 1), percussion (tracks 1, 3, 6), Hammond organ (tracks 2, 8–10), Mini-Moog synthesizer (tracks 2, 7, 9), Hammered dulcimer (track 3), piano (tracks 3–6, 9), melodica (tracks 4, 6), synthesizer (track 4), strings synthesizer (track 10)
- Lincoln Anderson – bass (tracks 1–3, 6–10), double bass (tracks 4–5)
- Stuart Elliott – drums (tracks 1–3, 7–10), hand drums (tracks 4–5), percussion (tracks 4, 7, 10)
- Katie Brine – backing vocals (tracks 1–3, 8, 10)
- Kerr Nice – piano (track 7)
- Grace Nickalls, Joe Dobson, Marcus Greenwood, Masie Colquhoun, Maya Hodgson, Sam Hewitson – choir on chorus (track 10)

Production

- Steve Harley – producer
- Nick Brine – engineer
- Dougal Watt, Owen Morgan, Alex Edmunds, Nelson Milburn – studio assistants
- Tom Povall – post production
- Denis Blackham – mastering

Design

- Mike Callow – photography
- With thanks to – "The Stranger on the Beach"
- Mark Scarfe at Aarlsen – sleeve design

== Charts ==
Chart (2010)	Peak position
UK Albums Chart	187
UK Independent Album Breakers Top 20 Chart	7
UK Independent Albums Chart Top 50	20

== Singles ==
Two digital singles, "Faith & Virtue" and "For Sale. Baby Shoes. Never Worn", were released from Stranger Comes to Town. Both releases used the same artwork as the album.

=== Faith & Virtue ===
"Faith & Virtue"

Single by Steve Harley
- Released: 2 May 2010
- Genre: Rock, pop rock
- Length: 4:48
- Label: Comeuppance Ltd
- Songwriter(s): Steve Harley; Barry Wickens
- Producer(s): Steve Harley

Steve Harley singles chronology
"The Last Goodbye" (2006)	"Faith & Virtue" (2010)	"For Sale. Baby Shoes. Never Worn" (2010)

The album's lead single, "Faith & Virtue", was written by Harley and Barry Wickens. It was released on 2 May 2010 as a digital-only single, with some promotional CD copies issued to radio stations.

Harley first announced the release of "Faith & Virtue" as a single in a diary entry of 3 March 2010, "All the team is now set up for the big push. We have radio/TV plugger Jackie Gill, who will do everything she can to get the single play-listed on Radio 2, and all the good TV she can muster." The song received its first play on BBC Radio 2 on 19 April on the Jools Holland show, when Harley appeared as the show's guest. The song was also given away as a free MP3 for anyone signing up for email updates on Harley's official website.

"Faith & Virtue" dated back ten years before it was recorded for Stranger Comes to Town. Speaking to The Bolton News in 2010, Harley commented, "The single was being played on the radio and my wife said 'I've always loved that song'. I explained that I'd only just finished the song when I realised that I'd actually been playing it on my piano for the last ten years and hadn't got round to recording it."

Track listing

1. "Faith & Virtue" – 4:48

=== For Sale. Baby Shoes. Never Worn ===
"For Sale. Baby Shoes. Never Worn"

Single by Steve Harley
- Released: 27 June 2010
- Genre: Rock, pop rock
- Length: 3:59
- Label: Comeuppance Ltd
- Songwriter(s): Steve Harley
- Producer(s): Steve Harley

Steve Harley singles chronology
"Faith & Virtue" (2010)	"For Sale. Baby Shoes. Never Worn" (2010)	"Ordinary People" (2015)

The album's second single, "For Sale. Baby Shoes. Never Worn", was written by Harley. A 'radio edit' of the track, which cut the song's duration by a minute, was released as a digital-only single on 27 June 2010.

The release of the single was first announced in Harley's diary entry of 31 May, "Over lunch, will make notes re edit of 'For Sale. Baby Shoes. Never Worn.' which we have agreed to release as a download single. Radio 2 airplay? Not much chance, to be honest. It's tough to get on their playlist if you're not represented by Universal or Sony. But Stranger Comes to Town is a major project, so we'll suck it and see." The song received its first play on BBC Radio 2 on 23 May 2010 on Johnnie Walker's Sounds of the 70s show, when Harley appeared as the show's guest.

"For Sale. Baby Shoes. Never Worn" had its origins dating back a decade before it was recorded for Stranger Comes to Town, with Harley first mentioning the song in an online diary entry in September 2000. Speaking of new additions to the live set, Harley revealed, "And a new lullaby, a longing, yearning lullaby where a terrified young man is saying, 'No. It cannot be what it appears to be; nothing living lies that still.....' beside his helpless wife's bed." Harley began working on a new studio album in 2000 and revealed in a 1 December 2001 diary entry that he was going into the studio that week to record "For Sale. Baby Shoes. Never Worn" and "The Last Feast". While no album materialised, Harley later recorded the song again with Cockney Rebel in February 2005 during sessions for The Quality of Mercy. The song did not make the album's final track listing.

Speaking of the song in 2010, Harley stated, "It's a sad story – children having children and not really having the means or wherewithal to deal with that."

Track listing

1. "For Sale. Baby Shoes. Never Worn" (Radio Edit) – 3:59
