= Acoustic and Pure: Live =

Live album by Steve Harley (with Jim Cregan and guests)
- Released: 2003
- Genre: Pop rock
- Length: 77:08
- Label: Comeuppance Discs
- Producer: Steve Harley, Matt Butler

Steve Harley (with Jim Cregan and guests) chronology
Stripped to the Bare Bones (1999)	Acoustic and Pure: Live (2003)	Anytime! (A Live Set) (2004)

Acoustic and Pure: Live is a live acoustic album by English songwriter and musician Steve Harley, released in 2003. The album features ex-Cockney Rebel guitarist Jim Cregan, while certain tracks also include other members of Cockney Rebel.

== Background ==
During 2002, Harley made plans for an extensive acoustic tour that autumn, which saw him being accompanied by the ex-Cockney Rebel guitarist Jim Cregan. This was the first time Cregan toured with Harley since 1976, after he left Cockney Rebel to join Rod Stewart's touring band. In early September 2002, Cregan began rehearsing forty songs for the upcoming tour, and later in the month travelled to the UK from Los Angeles. Harley and Cregan settled on a set-list of approximately twenty-five songs each night for the tour. It was also announced that at a small handful of venues, Harley and Cregan would be joined by members of the current Cockney Rebel line-up, including Barry Wickens and James Lascelles.

Speaking of the upcoming tour in a September 2002 diary entry for his official website, Harley announced that a live album would be released from the tour: "We're going to record most of the shows, then cull the best takes to compile an album. You'll be on a record! Provided you buy a ticket!" For the recording of the shows, Harley used equipment from FX Rentals in London as well as Sony MD. He later announced in October that he hoped to have the album released a few days after the tour's final show. He commented that the album would be a "first-rate reproduction of this tour".

In late 2002, with the tour ongoing, the album was made available as a pre-order. Soon afterwards, the album was produced, compiled and edited by Harley and Matt Butler at The Stone House in Herefordshire. It was mastered by Clive at Audio Edit Productions. Originally, the album's pre-orders were due to be dispatched before the end of the year. However, the album's release was delayed by a few weeks due to unforeseen printing issues over the CD's sleeve. Harley and his team had rejected the first two test prints from the printing company, and settled on the third. Commenting on its impending release in a January 2003 diary entry, Harley said: "I can only hope then that those who have bought it will be satisfied. We played 22 to 25 tracks each night, on a single CD 13 (including the chat) was ample. Someone had to decide and it was me. Because it is my record."

Acoustic and Pure: Live was released in early 2003. Featuring thirteen tracks, the album used performances from various recorded concerts on the tour. As written in the CD liner notes, during the tour, Harley and Cregan played at Reading, Chelsea, Felixstowe, Cheltenham, Pocklington, Bolton, Oswaldtwistle, Beverley, Wolverhampton, Croydon, Letchworth, Southampton, Pontardawe, Buxton, Sheffield, Blackheath, Folkestone, Newcastle, Milton Keynes, Worthing, Weston-Super-Mare, Manchester, Birkenhead, Aylesbury, Oxford, Colchester and Hayes.

After its release, Harley commented in a March diary entry:

"The release of the CD from the Autumn tour has given me great pleasure. It's gratifying to hear the comments made to the Guestbook on this site. We loved that tour and really wanted to put out a record that truly reflected its atmosphere. Some tracks have their little glitches, but I was determined not to doctor the tapes/mini-discs to the ninth degree, depriving myself, as well as all of you who were there, of its peccadilloes. Jim and I are real musicians, not machines or pre-programmed red-coats miming to a backing-track. And Live means Live. My dear friend, the masterful Matt Butler, did a fine job of mixing and cross-fading and correcting little technical nuisances."

Originally, Harley considered leaving his 1975 UK number one hit "Make Me Smile (Come Up and See Me)" off the CD. In a 2003 interview with the online music magazine Perfect Sound Forever, he admitted: "I was so fed up with it being absolutely everywhere on everything that's released by me." However, he eventually reconsidered and included the song.

Acoustic and Pure: Live features "The Last Feast" as its closing track, which was the song's first appearance on an album. It was included as an "un-retouched mini-disc recording". A studio version would later appear on the Steve Harley & Cockney Rebel album The Quality of Mercy, which was released in 2005.

== Release ==
The album was released by Harley's own label, Comeuppance Discs, on CD in the UK only. Colin Cotter for 3BC handled the album's manufacturing. It was made available for purchase on Harley's official website, by postal order and at Harley's and Cockney Rebel's concerts only. Later in 2003, Harley announced in Perfect Sound Forever that he was aiming to organise a full release of the album on a conventional label. However, these plans never materialised, and in 2004, Harley would release the new live album Anytime! (A Live Set). Today, the album remains out-of-print.

== Critical reception ==
Professional ratings
Review scores
Source	Rating
24.000 Dischi	3/5 stars

On its release, Andrew Thomas of The Westmorland Gazette considered "fans of great music and performances will be glad to hear Acoustic and Pure". He felt Harley was in "fine voice throughout" with the recording showing "his voice has got better and better with age". Thomas also praised Cregan's guitarwork as "very impressive". He picked "The Last Feast" as the highlight of the album.

== Track listing ==
No.	Title	Writer(s)	Length
1.	"Nothing is Sacred"	Steve Harley	5:20
2.	"Two Damn'd Lies"	Harley	5:44
3.	"Mr Soft"	Harley	3:17
4.	"Audience with the Man"	Harley	7:55
5.	"The Last Time I Saw You"	Harley	6:05
6.	"Sweet Dreams"	Harley	1:38
7.	"Psychomodo"	Harley	4:27
8.	"All in a Life's Work"	Harley	5:23
9.	"Riding the Waves (For Virginia Woolf)"	Harley	7:40
10.	"Tumbling Down"	Harley	9:21
11.	"A Friend for Life"	Harley; Jim Cregan	6:30
12.	"Make Me Smile (Come Up and See Me)"	Harley	4:47
13.	"The Last Feast"	Harley	8:55

== Personnel ==
- Steve Harley – lead vocals, guitar, harmonica
- Jim Cregan – lead guitar
- Barry Wickens – violin, guitar (tracks 3–4, 10–11, 13)
- James Lascelles – percussion, melodica (tracks 3–4, 11, 13)
- Robbie Gladwell – guitar (track 5)
- Stuart Elliott – drums (track 13)
- Lincoln Anderson – bass (track 13)

Production

- Steve Harley – producer, compiler, editor
- Matt Butler – producer, compiler, editor, studio mixing engineer
- Clive – mastering

Other

- Sally Arnold – co-ordination for Comeuppance Ltd.
- Steve Pittis – sleeve design for Enconahead
- Kees Gerritse – live photography
- Russ Naylor – live photography
- Phil Case – live photography
- Colin Cotter for 3BC – manufacturing
