= Steve Harley =

English singer and songwriter (1951–2024)

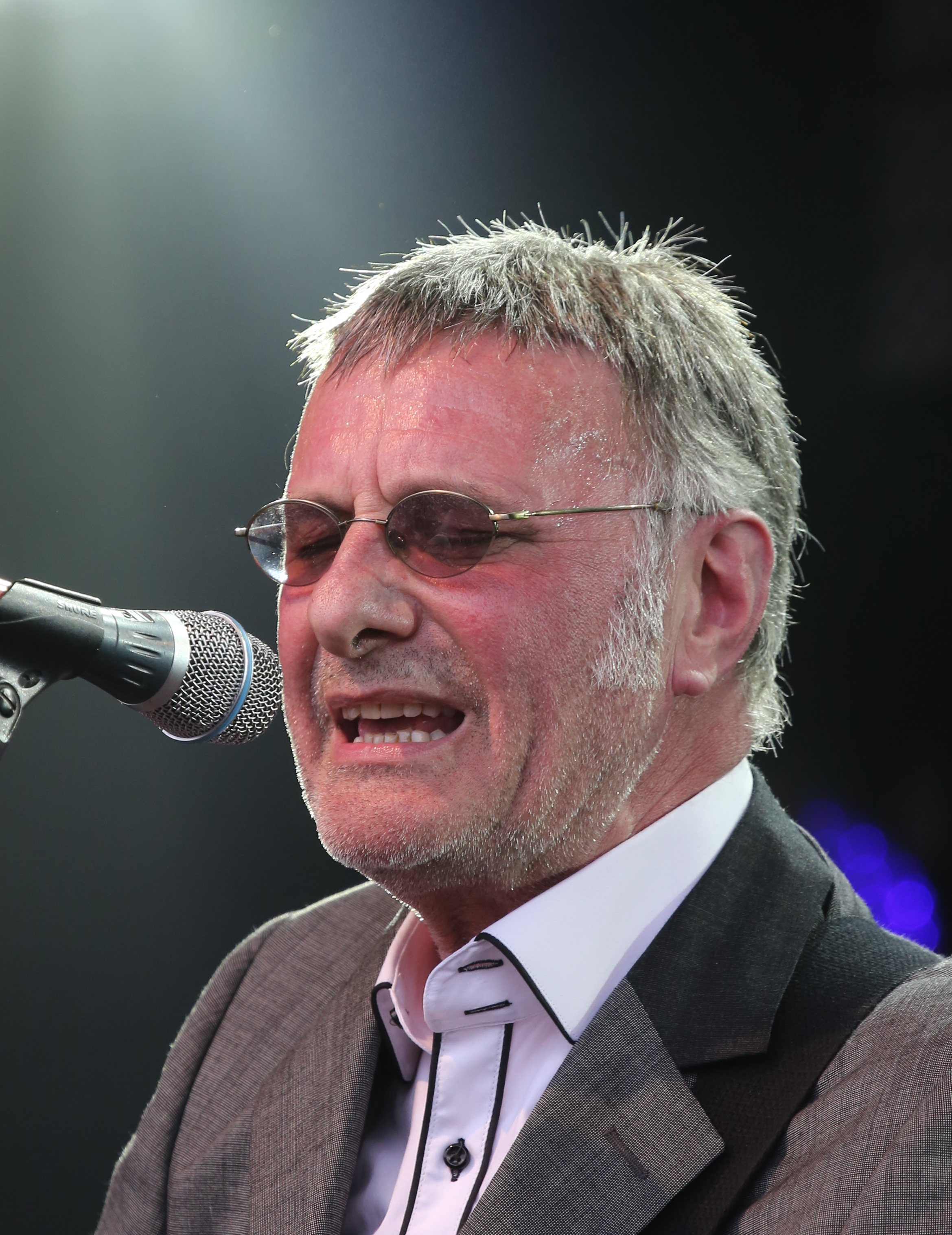
- Harley in 2014

Background information
- Born: Stephen Malcolm Ronald Nice; 27 February 1951; Deptford, London, England
- Died: 17 March 2024 (aged 73) Clare, Suffolk, England
- Genres: Rock; pop; glam rock
- Occupations: Singer-songwriter; musician
- Instruments: Vocals; guitar; harmonica
- Years active: 1972–2023
- Labels: EMI; Chrysalis; RAK; Gott Discs; Comeuppance; CTE
- Member of: Steve Harley & Cockney Rebel
- Website: steveharley.com

Stephen Malcolm Ronald Nice (27 February 1951 – 17 March 2024), known by his stage name Steve Harley, was an English singer-songwriter and frontman of the rock group Cockney Rebel. The band achieved five UK hit albums, including The Psychomodo (1974) and The Best Years of Our Lives (1975), and six UK hit singles in the mid-1970s, including "Judy Teen", "Mr. Soft", and the number one "Make Me Smile (Come Up and See Me)". Harley later scored a further three UK hit singles as a solo artist, most notably with "The Phantom of the Opera", a duet with Sarah Brightman, in 1986.

== Early life and education ==
Harley was born on 27 February 1951 in Deptford, London, the second of five children. His father Ronnie was a milkman and semi-professional footballer; his mother Joyce was a semi-professional jazz singer.

During the summer of 1953, aged two, Harley contracted a severe case of polio and the doctors told his father he was going to die. He survived, but spent four years in hospital between the ages of three and 16. He underwent major surgery in 1963 and 1966. After recovering from the first operation, aged 12, Harley was introduced to the poetry of T. S. Eliot and D. H. Lawrence, the prose of John Steinbeck, Virginia Woolf and Ernest Hemingway, and the music of Bob Dylan, which pointed him to future careers involving words and music. While in hospital he wrote poetry, finding inspiration in Dylan's ballads.

From the age of nine, Harley took classical violin lessons and he played in his grammar school orchestra. Aged 10, he began learning the guitar after his parents had given him a nylon-string Spanish guitar for Christmas, and he started to write his own songs.

Harley was a pupil at Edmund Waller Primary School in New Cross, London. He attended Haberdashers' Aske's Hatcham Boys' Grammar School until the age of 17. Aged 15, he took his O-level exams in his hospital bed. He left school without completing his A-level exams.

== Career ==
In 1968, at the age of 17, Harley began his first full-time job, working as a trainee accountant with the Daily Express, despite having gained only 24% in his mock O-level maths exam. From there he progressed to become a reporter, having wanted to be a journalist since the age of 12. After being interviewed by several newspaper editors, Harley signed to train with Essex County Newspapers. Over three years, Harley worked at the Essex County Standard, the Braintree and Witham Times, the Maldon and Burnham Standard and the Colchester Evening Gazette. He returned to London to work for the East London Advertiser (ELA), where he covered the story of the Kray murder at The Blind Beggar pub in Whitechapel. At the age of 21, unwilling to write a story about a woman who had taken two tins of food from a shop, Harley was determined to get sacked – an objective he achieved by not wearing a tie and growing his hair long. Among Harley's peers who made successful careers in national journalism were John Blake and Richard Madeley, who took over Harley's desk at the ELA in 1972.

Harley started his musical career in 1971 playing in bars and clubs, mainly at folk venues on open-mike nights. He sang at Les Cousins, Bunjies and The Troubadour in London on nights featuring John Martyn, Ralph McTell, Martin Carthy and Julie Felix, who were popular musicians in the London folk scene. In 1971, he joined the folk band Odin as rhythm guitarist and co-singer and there met Jean-Paul Crocker, who became the first Cockney Rebel violinist. He also recorded a number of his own songs as demos that year using his classical guitar at Venus Recording Studios in Whitechapel. Harley then began busking around London in 1972, including on the Underground and in Portobello Road, while also writing songs. He left the folk scene and formed the band Cockney Rebel in 1972, as a vehicle for his own work. The name was taken from an autobiographical poem he had written at school.

=== Cockney Rebel (1972–1977) ===
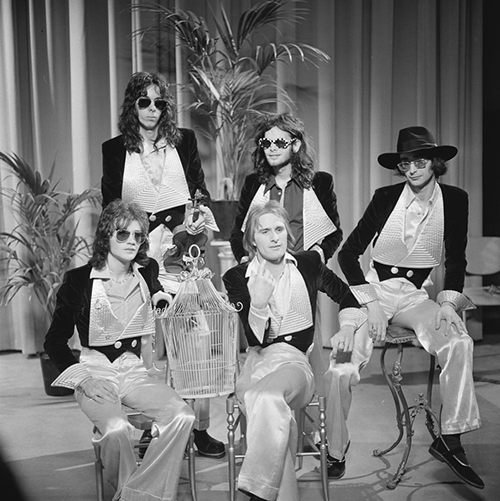
Cockney Rebel (with Harley at front centre) appearing on AVRO's TopPop TV show in 1974

The original Cockney Rebel consisted of Harley, Crocker, drummer Stuart Elliott, bassist Paul Jeffreys and guitarist Nick Jones. Jones was replaced by Pete Newnham, but with the arrival of keyboardist Milton Reame-James, Harley felt the band did not need electric guitar and settled on the combination of Crocker's electric violin and Reame-James' Fender Rhodes piano.

In 1972, Mickie Most discovered the band at a London nightclub, The Speakeasy Club, and offered them their first contract with his RAK Publishing. This influenced the A&R department at EMI Records to offer the band a three-album deal. Cockney Rebel recorded their debut album, The Human Menagerie, with producer Neil Harrison in June and July 1973. Their debut single, "Sebastian", became a hit across Europe but failed to chart in the UK. When released in November 1973, The Human Menagerie also failed to chart, although the album was well received critically and gained cult status.

The lack of UK success caused EMI to feel that the band had yet to record a potential hit single. In response, Harley re-worked the unrecorded song "Judy Teen", which was released in March 1974 and peaked at number 5 on the UK singles chart. In February and March 1974 the band recorded their second album, The Psychomodo, which was produced by Harley and Alan Parsons. It was released in June and peaked at number 8 in the UK Albums Chart. Between May and July 1974, the band toured the UK to promote the album, but tensions developed as the tour progressed. They received a 'Gold Award' on 18 July for outstanding new act of 1974, but a week later, with the tour finished, several members left. Crocker, Reame-James and Jeffreys chose to quit after Harley refused their demands to write material for the group, despite the initial understanding that Harley was the band's sole songwriter. Following the band's split, "Mr. Soft", taken from The Psychomodo, reached number 8 in the UK as a single.

Left without a permanent band, Harley soon began auditioning new musicians. Meanwhile, Harley and Parsons did some studio work with Dutch singer Yvonne Keeley, with whom Harley began a relationship, and EMI released her version of "Tumbling Down" as a single in August 1974, backed by another Cockney Rebel cover, "Loretta's Tale". Harley's debut solo single "Big Big Deal" was released in November 1974. The song failed to enter the UK top 50; however, it did enter the unnumbered BMRB's UK Breakers chart. By this time, a new line-up of Cockney Rebel had been finalised. With original drummer Stuart Elliott remaining in the band, the new line-up included guitarist Jim Cregan, keyboard player Duncan Mackay and bassist George Ford. Renamed Steve Harley & Cockney Rebel, they recorded the album The Best Years of Our Lives in November and December 1974, with Harley and Parsons again producing.

The lead single from the forthcoming album, "Make Me Smile (Come Up and See Me)", was released in January 1975. It became the band's biggest hit, reaching the number one spot on the UK Chart and receiving a UK Silver certification in February. It was also Harley's only Billboard chart entry in the US, reaching number 96 on the Hot 100 in 1976. In a 2002 television interview, Harley described how the song's lyrics were directed at his former band members who, he felt, had abandoned him. As of 2015, the song has sold around 1.5 million copies in the UK. The Performing Rights Society have confirmed the song as one of the most played records in British broadcasting and over 120 cover versions of the song have been recorded by other artists.

The Best Years of Our Lives was released in March 1975 and reached number 5 in the UK. A second single from the album, "Mr. Raffles (Man, It Was Mean)", was also a success, peaked at number 13. The band embarked on a UK and European tour to promote the album, and then recorded their fourth studio album, Timeless Flight, in the summer.< During the same period Harley also produced Dutch singer Patricia Paay's album Beam of Light, with members of Cockney Rebel performing on many of the tracks. Later in the year, Harley and the band went on tour in the US as a support act to the Kinks. As the band had not achieved commercial success there, the compilation A Closer Look was released exclusively for the US market.

Timeless Flight was released in February 1976 and peaked at number 18 in the UK. Two singles from the album, "Black or White" and "White, White Dove", both failed to enter the charts, although they did reach number 2 and number 6 respectively on the BMRB's UK Breakers chart. Another UK and European tour followed the album's release, then the band recorded their fifth album Love's a Prima Donna between June and September 1976. In July they released a cover of George Harrison's "Here Comes the Sun", which reached number 10 in the UK and became the band's last top 40 single, discounting a later re-release of "Make Me Smile". A second single from the upcoming album, "(I Believe) Love's a Prima Donna", was released in October, reaching number 41. Love's a Prima Donna was released in November 1976 and peaked at number 28. In the US, "(Love) Compared with You" was released as a single in 1977. For Mackay's second solo album Score, recorded in August and September 1976, and released in 1977, Harley wrote the lyrics to four tracks and provided lead vocals on "Time is No Healer".

In November 1976, Harley provided backing vocals on T. Rex's song "Dandy in the Underworld", which was released as a single from the album of the same name in 1977. In December 1976, the band embarked on an eight-date UK tour to promote Love's a Prima Donna. During the early part of 1977, Harley provided lead vocals on The Alan Parsons Project's song "The Voice" for their album I Robot. In July, Harley disbanded Cockney Rebel, the announcement of which was followed by the release of a live album, Face to Face: A Live Recording, which reached number 40 and spawned a single, "The Best Years of Our Lives".

=== Beginnings of solo career (1977–1979) ===
After Cockney Rebel's split, Harley signed to EMI for a further three years. He began recording his debut solo album in London and then flew to Los Angeles in February 1978 to complete it. He subsequently decided to emigrate to the US and rented a house in Beverly Hills. Harley stayed there for nearly a year to gain new experience and inspirations, but later admitted that during his time in America he was not inspired to write a single song. The album Hobo with a Grin was released in July 1978, but was not a commercial success, nor were its two singles, "Roll the Dice" and "Someone's Coming", although "Roll the Dice" was a radio hit. On the album, the tracks "Amerika the Brave" and "Someone's Coming" featured Marc Bolan's last studio performances, recorded shortly before his fatal car accident in September 1977.

Harley returned to London at the end of 1978 and recorded his second solo album, The Candidate, in February 1979. On 12 May, Harley and Peter Gabriel appeared as guest stars at one of Kate Bush's Hammersmith Odeon concerts during her Tour of Life. The show was staged as a benefit concert for the family of lighting technician Bill Duffield, who had died after a tragic fall earlier on Bush's tour. Duffield had previously worked for Harley and Gabriel. The concert was Harley's first performance on stage in over two years. The Candidate was released in October 1979 and was another commercial failure, although its single "Freedom's Prisoner" was moderately successful, peaking at number 58. In October, Harley performed a one-off show at the Hammersmith Odeon. Following the disappointing sales of The Candidate, EMI dropped Harley from their label.

=== 1980–1989 ===
During the 1980s, which he later described as his "wilderness years", Harley took time off from the music business while his two children were growing up. In July 1980, he undertook a short UK tour with a new line-up of Cockney Rebel and this was followed by a UK Christmas tour. The latter tour followed the release of the EMI compilation The Best of Steve Harley and Cockney Rebel in November. During the same year, "Somebody Special" and "Gi' Me Wings", two songs co-written by Harley, were released by Rod Stewart on his album Foolish Behaviour. "Somebody Special", as the album's third single in 1981, reached number 71 on the US Billboard Hot 100, and "Gi' Me Wings" reached number 45 on the Billboard Top Rock Tracks chart.

In 1981, Harley provided vocals on the song "No Name" for Rick Wakeman's album 1984. He also made an appearance to perform the song at Wakeman's concert at the Hammersmith Odeon. Harley and his band embarked on another small UK tour during Christmas 1981. In March 1982, the Midge Ure-produced single "I Can't Even Touch You" was released under the band's name. Despite expectations that it would become a hit, the single failed to reach the UK Singles Chart. In August 1982, Harley made his acting debut as the 16th-century playwright Christopher Marlowe in the rock musical Marlowe at the John Crawford Adams Playhouse at Hofstra University, Hempstead, New York. In June 1983, Cockney Rebel played a one-off concert in London and Harley released the single "Ballerina (Prima Donna)", which was written and produced by Mike Batt. It was one of Harley's most successful singles of the decade, peaking at number 51 in the UK. In July, the band performed at the Reading Festival, followed by a one-off concert at London's Camden Palace in December 1984. It was filmed for TV broadcast and VHS release as Live from London in 1985 and proved to be the band's last show until 1989.

In 1985, Harley signed a three-album recording contract with RAK Records. "Irresistible", recorded with Mickie Most as producer, was released as his debut single for the label in June 1985 and reached number 81 in the UK. Harley originally offered the song to Rod Stewart, who encouraged Harley to record it in the hope that it would put him back in the charts. Later that year, Mike Batt recommended Harley to Andrew Lloyd Webber for the recording of the title track of the upcoming The Phantom of the Opera musical, which Webber intended to release as a single to promote it. Harley's audition was successful and the song was recorded as a duet with Sarah Brightman. It was released in January 1986 and reached number 7 in the UK charts. Harley then successfully auditioned to play the title role on stage and spent five months working on the part, including rehearsal with producer Hal Prince. He was later surprised to be replaced by Michael Crawford.

While rehearsing for the musical, Harley released the non-album single "Heartbeat Like Thunder" in April 1986, though it was a commercial failure. In June 1986, a newly remixed version of "Irresistible" was issued as the lead single from Harley's forthcoming solo album El Gran Senor, but it failed to chart. When RAK folded and was sold to EMI shortly after, the album was shelved. After he left the Phantom musical, Harley continued his acting ambitions by undertaking acting lessons at the Guildhall School of Music and Drama. Later in 1986, he starred again as Marlowe when the musical of the same name ran in London and his performance was described by one leading critic as "a major and moving performance." During the same period, Harley undertook an English 'A' level course, to which he devoted three hours of study each day. He passed in June 1987 with a 'B' grade.

In 1988, Harley provided vocals on Mike Batt's song "Whatever You Believe", alongside Jon Anderson. On 3 May 1988, the trio performed the song at a live TV broadcast at Battersea Park in London as part of the Thames/LWT charity fundraising effort for the ITV Telethon. Later in November, a studio version was released as a charity TV tie-in single under the name Anderson, Harley & Batt. Following its use in a TV advert for Trebor Softmints, "Mr. Soft" was re-issued as a single in 1988.

In 1989, Harley assembled a new line-up of Cockney Rebel and returned to touring in the UK and Europe. He would continue performing as both a solo artist and with various incarnations of Cockney Rebel until his death. To promote the band's 1989 summer tour, Harley released the solo single "When I'm with You", which was recorded in early 1989 with ex-Cockney Rebel members Duncan Mackay and Jim Cregan at London's Point Studios. In October 1989, concert footage from the tour was released on VHS as The Come Back, All is Forgiven Tour: Live. In late 1989, Harley was scheduled to play the title role in a feature film based on the true story of John 'Babbacombe' Lee, an Englishman famous for surviving three attempts to hang him for murder. The film never raised the necessary funding and the project was cancelled in the early 1990s.

=== 1990–1999 ===
Throughout 1989 and 1990, Harley continued touring and recording material for a new album. During 1990, he also contributed lead vocals on "Harrow on the Hill", a track from the album Poetry in Motion featuring the words of Sir John Betjeman and music by Mike Read. In October 1991, Harley was invited to play the Night of the Proms, where he performed "Sebastian" and "Make Me Smile".

By the early 1990s, Steve Harley & Cockney Rebel had re-established themselves as a major live act across Europe. In 1992, EMI released a new compilation album, Make Me Smile – The Best of Steve Harley and Cockney Rebel, along with a re-issue of "Make Me Smile" as a single, which reached number 46 in the UK. Harley's solo album Yes You Can was released in Europe in 1992 and the UK in 1993. It featured older songs dating from the El Gran Senor period and some new tracks. "Irresistible" was released as a single from the album in Europe and "Star for a Week (Dino)" was released as a promotional single in the UK.

In 1995, the compilation Live at the BBC was released; it included some early Cockney Rebel sessions from 1974, and a 1992 session. The same year saw another re-issue of "Make Me Smile", which reached number 33 in the UK. Harley released a new studio album, Poetic Justice, in 1996, which was a critical success. In 1997, Harley participated in the Granada Men & Motors TV music quiz show Elvis Has Just Left the Building, hosted by Mike Sweeney, with Noddy Holder and Clint Boon as team captains.

In 1998, Harley embarked on his first acoustic tour "Stripped to the Bare Bones" with Cockney Rebel's violinist and guitarist Nick Pynn accompanying him. The pair played over a hundred dates, including fifty-four concerts in the UK, and coincided with the release of a new compilation album, More Than Somewhat – The Very Best of Steve Harley, which reached number 82 in the charts. The live album Stripped to the Bare Bones, with tracks recorded at the Jazz Café in London during March 1998, was released in April 1999. In 1999, the new compilation The Cream of Steve Harley & Cockney Rebel was released, Harley formed his own label "Comeuppance", and he began presenting the BBC Radio 2 programme Sounds of the 70s, with the first series featuring eight editions.

=== 2000–2009 ===
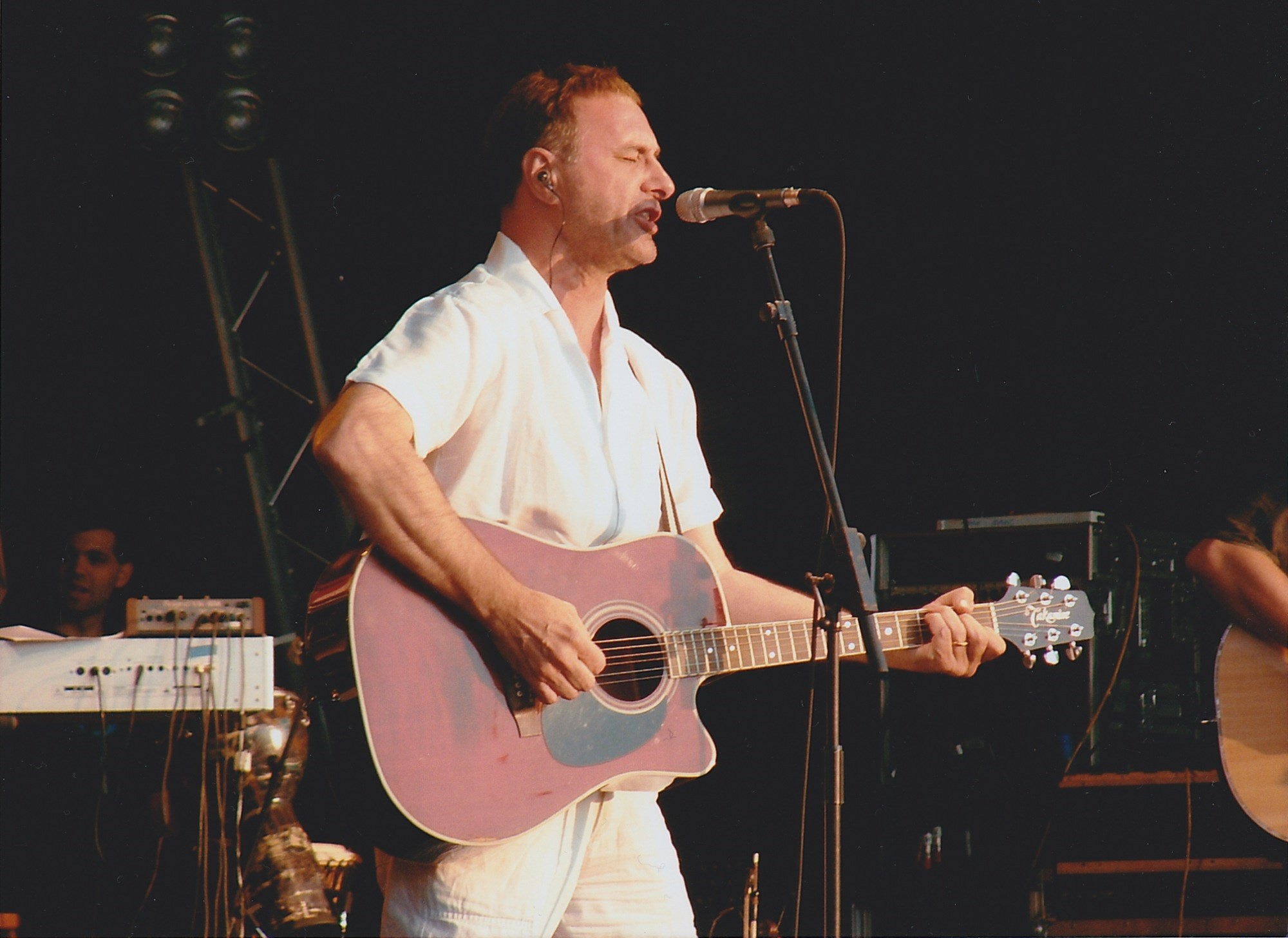
Harley live at GuilFest in 2004

In 2000, Harley re-issued his first two solo albums, Hobo with a Grin and The Candidate, on CD through Comeuppance, and between March and May he embarked on the acoustic tour "Stripped Again", accompanied by Cockney Rebel guitarist Robbie Gladwell. The twelve editions of the second series of Sounds of the 70s aired across 2000 and, with high listening figures for the first two series, Harley accepted the BBC's offer to present the show all year round. To accommodate his touring schedule, he began the new deal by pre-recording three shows at a time. The show continued for the next eight years and the last programme was aired on 27 March 2008. It reached an audience of over 400,000 weekly.

In 2000, Harley began working on a new studio album and opened talks with various record labels. Although no album materialised for a few years, the single "A Friend for Life" was released in April 2001 and reached number 125 in the UK. The song, co-written with Jim Cregan, was originally offered to Rod Stewart, who would record his own version for his 2015 album Another Country. In 2001, Steve Harley & Cockney Rebel embarked on their first tour in four years, "Back with the Band".

Harley was involved with the charity Mines Advisory Group from 2002. He became an ambassador for the charity and led two fundraising treks, one around Cambodia in 2002 and the other across Death Valley in 2007. In 2002, Harley was awarded a Gold Badge of Merit by the British Academy of Composers and Songwriters. In 2003, he released the live album Acoustic and Pure: Live, featuring recordings from various UK concerts played during the previous autumn with Cregan. Towards the end of the year, Harley travelled to Cologne to collaborate with German artist Guido Dossche on the song "Ich Bin Gott", which was issued as a single in Germany in 2004.

In 2004, the live album Anytime! (A Live Set) was released under the name The Steve Harley Band. During June of that year, Steve Harley & Cockney Rebel played at the Isle of Wight Festival and the full performance was released on DVD in 2005 as Live at the Isle of Wight Festival. In June 2005, a newly recorded version of "Make Me Smile" was released, dubbed the "30th Anniversary Re-mix", and reached number 55 in the UK.

A new studio album, The Quality of Mercy, was released in 2005; it was Harley's first studio album to be released under the Cockney Rebel name since 1976. The band embarked on their biggest UK and European tour since the 1970s to promote it, with over 50 dates set between September and December 2005. The album was a critical success and also charted at number 40 in Norway in early 2006. "The Last Goodbye", released as a single from the album in 2006, peaked at number 186 in the UK Singles Chart and number 21 in the UK Independent Singles Chart.

In 2006, EMI released The Cockney Rebel - A Steve Harley Anthology, a CD box-set compilation album spanning the recording career of Cockney Rebel and Harley's solo work. In 2007, Harley starred with Mike Bennett in the West End premiere of the Samuel Beckett plays Rough for Theatre I and Rough for Theatre II. The plays ran for a week in July at London's Arts Theatre. In 2008, Harley released a book, The Impression of Being Relaxed, which is a collection of diary entries he had published on his website between 2000 and 2008. In 2009, Harley received a Special Award from Childline Rocks for his charity work at Classic Rock magazine's award ceremony in London's Park Lane Hotel. His efforts raising money for the Mines Advisory group and several schools for Disabled Children were cited in a speech delivered by blues guitarist Joe Bonamassa.

=== 2010–2024 ===
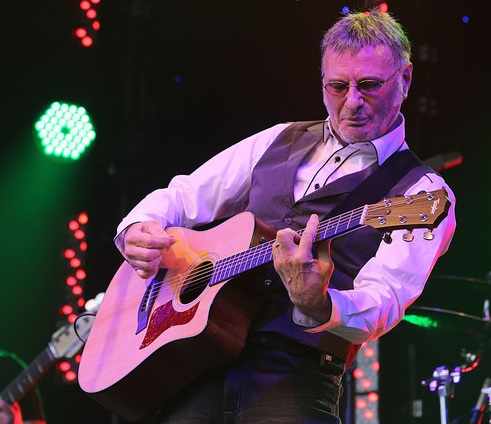
Harley live at the Concert at the Kings Festival in 2014

In May 2010, Harley released a new album, Stranger Comes to Town, which he described as a "protest album". It reached number 187 in the UK and spawned two digital singles, "Faith & Virtue" and "For Sale. Baby Shoes. Never Worn". Earlier that year in February, Harley, a self-confessed technophobe, attributed poor literacy rates and the moral corrosion of British society to modern technology.

In April 2012, Harley embarked on a promotional tour of Australia, with Australian guitarist Joe Matera accompanying him. The pair made a number of appearances on radio and TV and performed live acoustic sessions. In October 2012, EMI released the remastered four-disc box-set anthology compilation Cavaliers: An Anthology 1973-1974, which chronicled the recording career of the original Cockney Rebel line-up.

On 24 November 2012, Harley and his band, along with the Orchestra of the Swan and their Chamber Choir, performed the first two Cockney Rebel albums, The Human Menagerie and The Psychomodo, in their entirety for the first time at the Birmingham Symphony Hall. The performance was released as a double-CD and DVD in October 2013, titled Birmingham. The album reached number 158 in the UK Albums Chart and number 36 in the UK Independent Albums Chart. The same show was performed live four more times in 2014 at Manchester's Bridgewater Hall, Sage Gateshead, London's Royal Albert Hall, and again at the Birmingham Symphony Hall.

In January 2015, "Make Me Smile" re-charted at number 72 in the UK, after Top Gear presenters Jeremy Clarkson, Richard Hammond and James May urged viewers to download the song, as part of their discussion that Harley had recently received a speeding fine. Later in September, Harley's first new song of five years, "Ordinary People", was released as a digital single. In November, Harley and the surviving members of the original second line-up of Cockney Rebel reunited for a 16-date UK tour to celebrate the 40th anniversary of The Best Years of Our Lives album. The band were also accompanied by the MonaLisa Twins.

In 2015, Harley pledged to help raise funds for a new memorial to his late friend Mick Ronson. He played for free at the Hull City Hall in April 2016 to help kick-start the appeal. In November 2016, Harley was one of a number of musicians who teamed up with British Members of Parliament and the Royal Opera House Thurrock Community Chorus to record a charity version of the Rolling Stones song "You Can't Always Get What You Want" in memory of Labour MP Jo Cox. The song was released as a single in December 2016, with all proceedings going to the Jo Cox Foundation, and reached number 136 in the UK Singles Chart, number 24 in the Singles Sales Chart and number 9 in the Independent Singles Chart.

Harley released Uncovered in February 2020, an album made up of two Harley originals and nine interpretations of songs he said he wished he had written. The planned UK and European tour to promote the album was postponed due to the COVID-19 pandemic, with only the first nine shows played as planned. Two shows were, however, played in September 2020, both in the acoustic trio format, though bassist Oli Hayhurst accompanied the trio on the second of these shows. In addition, Harley held an online question and answer session via Zoom in mid-December 2020. The success of this event led to further Zoom Q and A events: two in November 2021 and one in November 2022.

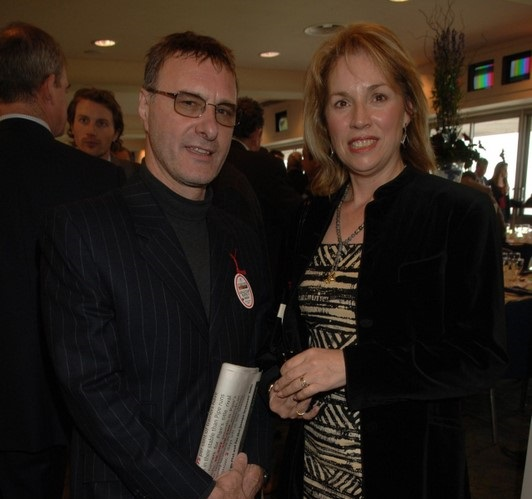
Harley and his wife, Dorothy, in 2005

In the aftermath of the pandemic, Harley's live shows resumed in August 2021, and the rescheduled 2020 tour took place between May and July 2022. In October 2023, after touring earlier in the year, Harley was forced to cancel all upcoming late 2023 and early 2024 shows, citing "a medical procedure followed by a period of recuperation". Harley later revealed that he had cancer, and was forced to cancel or postpone all shows scheduled for 2024. This included the "Come Up and See Me... And Other Stories" tour, on which Harley was due to perform acoustic versions of his songs with his bandmate Barry Wickens, tell anecdotes and take part in Q&A sessions.

== Personal life ==
Harley got engaged to his first serious girlfriend at the age of 17. He was in a relationship with Dutch singer Yvonne Keeley from 1973. They primarily lived together at Harley's flat in the Marylebone area of London, except for a period in 1978 when they lived in Beverly Hills. The pair contemplated marriage in 1977, but those plans did not materialise and they split up in 1979.

Harley met air stewardess Dorothy Crombie in October 1979 on a flight to Newcastle and they married at Marylebone Register Office in February 1981. They had two children and lived in Clare, Suffolk, near the North Essex border. In 1991, the pair celebrated their tenth anniversary with a wedding blessing ceremony at their church in Belchamp Otten.

During the 1980s, Harley became involved with his local Anglican church. He frequently read the lesson during Sunday services and was a member of the parochial church council from 1989. He also later served as a councillor for Belchamp St Paul and Belchamp Otten Parish Council until 2023.

Harley was involved in racehorse ownership from 1984, and racing became his main pastime until his death in 2024. In 2001, it was reported that Harley co-owned five racehorses.

== Illness and death ==
In December 2023, Harley announced on his website that he had cancer. He died at his home in Suffolk on 17 March 2024, aged 73.

== Partial discography ==
=== Studio albums ===
- The Human Menagerie (1973) (as Cockney Rebel)
- The Psychomodo (1974) (as Cockney Rebel)
- The Best Years of Our Lives (1975) (as Steve Harley & Cockney Rebel)
- Timeless Flight (1976) (as Steve Harley & Cockney Rebel)
- Love's a Prima Donna (1976) (as Steve Harley & Cockney Rebel)
- Hobo with a Grin (1978)
- The Candidate (1979)
- Yes You Can (1992)
- Poetic Justice (1996)
- The Quality of Mercy (2005) (as Steve Harley & Cockney Rebel)
- Stranger Comes to Town (2010)
- Uncovered (2020)
