= Anytime! (A Live Set) =

Live album by The Steve Harley Band/Steve Harley
- Released: 2004
- Genre: Pop rock
- Length: 72:53
- Label: Gott Discs
- Producer: Steve Harley; Matt Butler

The Steve Harley Band/Steve Harley chronology
Acoustic and Pure: Live (2003)	Anytime! (A Live Set) (2004)	The Quality of Mercy (2005)

Anytime! (A Live Set) is a live acoustic album by Steve Harley, released by Gott Discs in 2004 under the name the Steve Harley Band (featuring members of the Steve Harley & Cockney Rebel line-up of the time).

== Background ==
Following the early 2003 release of the live album Acoustic and Pure: Live, Harley soon organised a new UK and Irish acoustic tour for May–June 2003, which would feature four members of Cockney Rebel - Barry Wickens, Robbie Gladwell, James Lascelles and Lincoln Anderson. In a June online diary entry, Harley revealed that several shows on the tour had been recorded for a future live CD. He commented:

"Have recorded several shows, the Jazz Café being the really interesting one so far. Worcester is sold-out for this Saturday and we are recording that one, too. Some venue, the Huntingdon Hall. Should sound quite fabulous on the digital recording. Will decide on tracks a short while after the tour, and mix them with my dear mate, the brilliant Matt Butler."

Later in October, he announced the idea of using tracks from both the Huntingdon Hall and the Jazz Café concerts for the album. He also spoke of the possibility of including one or two newly-recorded studio tracks, as well as an unreleased studio track from Harley's sessions with Mickie Most in the mid-1980s. By November, Harley announced that he was considering mixing the live tracks and getting the album ready for a release in March 2004, to coincide with an upcoming UK tour.

During November, work commenced on the live recordings, with Harley working with engineer Matt Butler. Harley revealed in a diary entry that month:

"New album almost ready! My friend and favourite recording engineer, Matt Butler, is working on the Worcester and Jazz Café recordings now and I have to say, the two tracks I've already received, finished, are quite stunning. The chaps played some beautiful music, didn't they! Haven't settled on a list, yet, but if some titles are same as on the last one, that's because this was a different show and the record will be released on a bona fide record label. 'Mirror Freak' is in there. 'The Last Feast' and 'A Friend for Life', too, but mostly tracks which did not appear on Acoustic and Pure: Live."

In January 2004, Harley announced the new album was on schedule for being released at the beginning of the upcoming tour. By the end of that month, the album's title had been decided upon, while the artwork had also been completed. Harley commented: "I like it a lot. Matt Butler has done a fine job of re-mixing the sound and the Worcester and Jazz Café audiences do more than their bit. There is some really brilliant playing from the band. It will be on sale from the first night of the tour, in lobbies around Britain, from Southampton to, well, Glasgow, eh!" Anytime! (A Live Set) was released in 2004 and features eleven live tracks and a bonus track, "Sophistication", a previously unreleased studio recording from 1986.

In a June 2005 interview with Record Collector magazine's Nick Dalton, Harley spoke of his current musical style: "Anytime! is seriously unplugged electro-acoustic. It's similar to original Cockney Rebel – violin, no electric guitar. But I still like playing with my electric band."

== Sophistication ==
The previously unreleased track "Sophistication", from 1986, was produced by Harley and Mickie Most. Like much of Harley's output from the same period, the song was due to be released on Harley's solo album El Gran Senor. However, the album was shelved and left unreleased after RAK Records went bankrupt later in the year. Although many of the songs would later be re-recorded for Harley's 1992 album Yes You Can, "Sophistication" remained unreleased. Despite this, Harley frequently performed the song live during 1989, after Steve Harley & Cockney Rebel made a return to touring with the "Come Back, All is Forgiven" tour.

The song features Andrew Gold on keyboards. Harley later recalled in 2015,

"Andrew Gold plays that wonderful, jazzy piano all through the song. He was brilliant. And didn't take a penny for the session. He was working in a different RAK studio while I recorded "Sophistication"; he had a partnership with Graham Gouldman, called "Wax". I was talking to Andrew in the kitchen, and he told me Graham was mixing a track and that he, Andrew, found the whole mixing process boring so usually sits it out. I played him "Sophistication" and said I'd love to hear a New York, Gershwin-like piano part and solo in there. He jumped up, walked to the piano in our room and said, "roll the tape". I left him to play his way, and it was very New York, very Gershwin. He was simply brilliant; a musician's musician; faultless and brilliant. I treasure that moment, that afternoon working with him. Always have. It's a fantastic solo."

While Harley was considering the release of a new live album, he had first mentioned the possibility of releasing "Sophistication" in an October 2003 diary entry. Speaking of an "old recording", he said: "Don't imagine even the most fervent and enterprising among you has the track I'm thinking of on bootleg! Only Mickie Most and I ever took copies and the master tapes are here in this house. Gotcha!" Later in November, Harley sent the song's quarter-inch tape to engineer Matt Butler. In a diary entry at that time, Harley revealed: "Waiting to hear from Matt regarding the state of the quarter-inch tape he's been sent. It's 17 years old and will need treating with kid gloves."

== Release ==
The album was released by Gott Discs on CD in the UK only, with Pinnacle Records handling the distribution. It was licensed to Gott by Harley's own Comeuppance Ltd. The album's photographs of Harley, including the front cover shot, were taken by Manfred Esser during October 2003 in Germany.

== Critical reception ==
Professional ratings
Review scores
Source	Rating
Classic Rock	8/10 stars
Get Ready to Rock!	3/5 stars
24.000 Dischi (Italian Dalai editore book)	3/5 stars

In a 2005 review of Anytime! (A Live Set), Peter Makowski of Classic Rock commented: "Mr Soft gets unplugged. A few months ago I saw Pete Doherty play a solo acoustic show at my local. Never a big fan of The Libertines, I must admit that he was spectacular. Solo and hype-free, you could see that he was actually a gifted songwriter. The same goes for Steve Harley who is a craftsman with a canny ear for a hook and catchy chorus. Both artistes have attitude and conviction; both are former buskers. Here 'live and unplugged' the former Cockney Rebel takes us through a tour of all the hits and more. But it's the lesser-known material like the emotive 'A Friend for Life' that makes Harley sound fresh and edgy, like a latter day Libertine."

Joe Geesin of the webzine Get Ready to Rock! said: "Opener 'Mr Soft' has an uptempo quirky offbeat, while the violin on 'Mirror Freak' adds an interesting if moody touch. Ballads, rockers and acoustic strumming, all the styles explored do nod back to the pub rock roots, and many emphasise Harley's songwriting. Of course there's the obligatory 'Make Me Smile (Come Up and See Me)' which does work rather well. Thoroughly enjoyable, but probably more for the fans." In the 2007 Italian book 24.000 Dischi (24,000 discs), Riccardo Bertoncelli and Cris Thellung stated: "An acoustic concert, new songs and interpretations of old classics, which are still beautiful and mostly performed by Harley with a passion and feeling really touching."

== Track listing ==
No.	Title	Writer(s)	Length
1.	"Mr Soft"	Steve Harley	3:33
2.	"Mirror Freak"	Harley	6:19
3.	"The Best Years of Our Lives"	Harley	5:22
4.	"The Last Feast"	Harley	7:45
5.	"Riding the Waves (For Virginia Woolf)"	Harley	9:34
6.	"Judy Teen"	Harley	3:04
7.	"Sling It!"	Harley	4:00
8.	"A Friend for Life"	Harley, Jim Cregan	5:52
9.	"Two Damn'd Lies"	Harley	6:07
10.	"Make Me Smile (Come Up and See Me)"	Harley	6:33
11.	"Sebastian"	Harley	10:56
12.	"Sophistication"	Harley	3:48

== Personnel ==
Steve Harley Band

- Steve Harley – vocals, acoustic guitar
- Robbie Gladwell – guitar, backing vocals
- Barry Wickens – violin, guitar, backing vocals
- James Lascelles – percussion (all tracks), hammered dulcimer (track 11), melodica (track 8)
- Lincoln Anderson – double bass

Recording and production

- Steve Harley – producer
- Matt Butler – producer, mixer
- Matt Davis, Mike Hood, Nick Smith, Chris Wemyss, Gary Low, Dave Boothroyd – recording team at Huntingdon Hall, Worcester
- Eliot James from FX Rentals – recording team at Jazz Café, London
- Rob Andrews – recording team at Chapel Lane Studios
- Jake Jackson – recording team at AIR Studios
