= Live at the BBC (Steve Harley & Cockney Rebel album) =

Compilation album by Steve Harley & Cockney Rebel
- Released: 10 July 1995
- Genre: Pop, rock
- Length: 57:08
- Label: Windsong International Records
- Producer: Tony Wilson (tracks 1-5); Jeff Griffin (tracks 6-9); Paul Williams (tracks 10-14)

Steve Harley & Cockney Rebel chronology
Yes You Can (1992)	Live at the BBC (1995)	Poetic Justice (1996)

Live at the BBC is a live compilation album by Steve Harley & Cockney Rebel, released by Windsong International Records on 10 July 1995. The compilation features three different sessions by the band for the BBC: two in 1974 and one in 1992.

== Background ==
Live at the BBC features three separate performances by the band over fourteen tracks. The two 1974 performances feature the original Cockney Rebel line-up that split up in 1974. The first five tracks make up the first session, which was recorded for John Peel on 28 May 1974. The second set of four tracks were recorded 'Live in Concert' on 22 January 1974. The final five tracks were recorded for Nicky Campbell in 1992. The session features Harley and three of the existing Cockney Rebel line-up of that time. Of the five 1992 tracks, two are abridged versions of "Make Me Smile (Come Up and See Me)" and "Riding the Waves". In the compilation's liner notes, Harley commented of the 1974 sessions: "The tracks herein are the musical manifestation of a group of boys on the first rung of a most unstable ladder. We didn't reach the top together. But here lies proof that these early, 'live' recordings and their inherent memories fill me with pride."

The two 1974 sessions remained exclusive to the Live at the BBC compilation until 2012, when the remastered anthology Cavaliers: An Anthology 1973-1974 was released. This featured both 1974 sessions in their entirety. The notable inclusion on the anthology is an additional track, "Hideaway", as part of the 'Live in Concert' performance. The song was not included on the Live at the BBC compilation. During "Mr Raffles", from the 1992 Nicky Campbell session, Harley forgot some of the lyrics in the second half of the song. In the liner notes, he added: "Forgive the "condor moment" in "Mr Raffles". This late night interview/session fell in the middle of a very long tour. I must have been a little tired."

== Release ==
The album was released in the UK on 10 July 1995 by Windsong International Records on CD. The independent label specialised in releasing recordings made for or by BBC Radio One for broadcast on the "In Concert" radio programme. The liner notes, written by Harley in February 1995, includes his recollections of the original Cockney Rebel line-up. In 1998, the album was re-issued under a new title, On Air. The two albums used the same close-up photograph of Harley on their front covers, which was taken by Mick Rock in 1974.

== Critical reception ==
Professional ratings
Review scores
Source	Rating
AllMusic	3/5 stars
NME	6/10
Q	4/5 stars

Upon its release, John Bauldie of Q stated, "A timely reminder of just how good the first Cockney Rebel were, for nine of the tracks here were recorded by that original eccentric line-up, five in session, four in concert. The session is excellent [and] the concert tracks, notably 'Sebastian' and 'Death Trip', are absurdly but impressively melodramatic. The 1992 session, serves to remind that it wasn't Steve Harley who changed, just the times." David Quantick of NME called Harley a "classic Jacques Brel-influenced rock poet" who "occupie[d] the enormous middle ground between David Bowie and Bob Dylan". He noted that the original Cockney Rebel material presented here, including the "most over-the-top campodrama ballad ever" ("Sebastian"), features Harley's "Brett Anderson-type voice in full" and shows he "had an ear for a bizarre tune". Quantick added, "And compared to him, Suede are sweaty labourers building a lumpy concrete flyover." Andrew Thomas of The Westmorland Gazette said that the 1974 tracks display a "real sense of exuberance and originality", with Cockney Rebel "coming across as a professional, well-rehearsed and tight unit". He noted how Harley has "plenty of fun with his distinctive vocal delivery", Reame-James "shows an inspired light-fingered touch on the electric piano" and Crocker's violin work is "always inventive". In contrast, he said that the 1992 tracks "show just how well Harley's voice has matured".

Dave Thompson of AllMusic said, "Live at the BBC begins with a straightforward examination of the original Cockney Rebel legacy. Then vocalist Steve Harley presses the fast-forward button and suddenly it's 1992, and he's on another of those interminable comebacks, mixing old classics with new half-hopers and, though you can kind of see the connection, it's still hard to believe that the verbosity, vision, and doom-laden prophecy of the olden days could ever have become so self-satisfied. So don't play the later stuff. The early performances alone are worth the price of admission and then some." Sarra Manning of Melody Maker recalled how Cockney Rebel "managed to create a sound that veered alarmingly into the rock opera genre" by "spurning the humble electric guitar in favour of a piano and violin" and, as a result, "over compensated with fiddly arpeggios and annoying electronic squiggles". She continued that, "amid all this dubious musical experimentation", the band produced two "decent songs": "Mr. Soft" and "Make Me Smile (Come Up and See Me)". She concluded, "Unfortunately, it's 1995 and over-pronounced Cockernee accents remind me of Damon and scratchy fiddles recreate traumatic memories of the Waterboys. It was 1974, I guess you had to be there." Neil McKay of Sunday Life wrote, "With Harley back in the charts with 'Make Me Smile', this is a timely, if ultimately unconvincing, offering. The distinctive art rock of the 1974 session and live tracks has dated none too well, and the 1992 unplugged style retreads are little better." A reviewer for the Poole & Dorset Advertiser stated, "Back to a prolonged Peel session from 1974 and a short acoustic return for Nicky Campbell in 1992. By the time Harley came back the sub-Ziggy burst of genuine creativity heard on the Peel tracks had disappeared into lame nostalgia."

== Track listing ==
No.	Title	Writer(s)	Length
1.	"Bed in the Corner"	Steve Harley	3:27
2.	"Sling It"	Harley	2:42
3.	"Mr. Soft"	Harley	3:16
4.	"Sweet Dreams"	Harley	1:47
5.	"Psychomodo"	Harley	3:57
6.	"Crazy Raver"	Harley	3:44
7.	"Loretta's Tale"	Harley	4:17
8.	"Sebastian"	Harley	7:16
9.	"Death Trip"	Harley	10:31
10.	"Mr Raffles"	Harley	4:34
11.	"Victim of Love"	Harley, Ian Nice, Kevin Powell, Barry Wickens, Rick Driscoll	5:01
12.	"Make Me Smile (Come Up and See Me) (Abridged)"	Harley	1:14
13.	"Star for a Week (Dino)"	Harley	4:21
14.	"Riding the Waves (Abridged)"	Harley	1:01

== Personnel ==
- Steve Harley – vocals (all tracks), acoustic guitar (tracks 1–9), guitar (tracks 10–14)
- Jean-Paul Crocker – violin (tracks 1–9)
- Milton Reame-James – piano (tracks 1–9)
- Paul Jeffreys – bass (tracks 1–9)
- Stuart Elliott – drums (tracks 1–9)
- Milton McDonald – guitar (tracks 10–14)
- Nick Pynn – guitar, violin (tracks 10–14)
- Ian Nice – keyboards (tracks 10–14)

Production

- Tony Wilson – producer (tracks 1–5)
- Jeff Griffin – producer (tracks 6–9)
- Paul Williams – producer (tracks 10–14)

Other

- Mick Rock – photograph
- Kee Scott Associates, London – design
