= The River Detectives =

Folk rock duo

- Origin: Craigneuk, Scotland
- Genres: Rock
- Years active: 1985–2009
- Members: Sam Corry; Dan O'Neill

The River Detectives were a folk rock duo from Craigneuk in Wishaw, Scotland. The duo, formed in 1985, comprised Sam Corry (vocals, guitar, harmonica) and Dan O'Neill (vocals, guitar, drums). The River Detectives have released three albums to date and had a UK top 75 hit with their song, "Chains".

== History ==
The band played their first show at Jack Daniel's Pub in Motherwell on 18 August 1986. In 1988 the band toured extensively in Scotland and attracted the interest of the Warner Bros. Records label, becoming the first Scottish band to sign for them in over a decade. Shortly afterwards, the duo moved to Glasgow to pen the songs for their debut album, Saturday Night Sunday Morning. The album spawned the UK top 75 hit "Chains".

The band recruited Van Morrison's backing group for the follow-up album, Elvis Has Left the Building, released in 1992. The album's title is a reference to the state of music at the time of the record's release when computer technology and the rise of the DJ were rampant and conventional performers were becoming peripheral. After the album's release, the band relocated to Ireland, where they wrote and toured extensively and guested on a number of records. By 1996, after playing the Splashy Fen festival in the Natal Province, the band received further invitations to tour in the country and relocated to Durban for a year before returning to the UK in 2000 to take a break.

The duo reunited when Corry asked O'Neil for assistance in finishing lyrics to a new song, "Capetown to Glasgow". This song featured on their third release, King of the Ghost Train Ride, which was released on Neontetra Records in 2005.

The duo played a full band set at the O2 ABC in Glasgow on 28 September 2009, which they announced during the show was their farewell gig.

== Discography ==
=== Albums ===
Year	Album	UK
1989	Saturday Night Sunday Morning	51
1992	Elvis Has Left the Building	—
2005	King of the Ghost Train Ride	—
"—" denotes releases that did not chart.

=== Singles ===
Year	Song	UK
1989	"Chains"	51
1989	"You Don't Know a Thing About Her"	86
1989	"Saturday Night, Sunday Morning"	—
1990	"Will You Spin Me Round"	—
2006	"Blue Collar Love Song" (download only single)	—
"—" denotes releases that did not chart.
