= Isle of Wight Festival 2004 =

Third revived Isle of Wight Festival

- Genre: rock, pop
- Dates: 11–13 June 2004
- Locations: Seaclose Park, Newport, Isle of Wight, UK
- Website: Official website

The Isle of Wight Festival 2004 was the third revived Isle of Wight Festival held at the Seaclose Park site in Newport on the Isle of Wight. The festival capacity, 35,000, was a significant increase on the previous years capacity, and represented its burgeoning status as a force in the United Kingdom festival circuit. It was the first year of Nokia sponsorship, and attracted talents such as The Who and David Bowie. The Libertines were scheduled to perform but pulled out due to sickness of Peter Doherty.

Undergoing emergency angioplasty in Hamburg after a concert in Germany on 25 June, the 13 June concert would prove to be Bowie's last live performance in the UK.

== Line Up ==
=== Main stage ===
Friday	Saturday	Sunday
Stereophonics; Groove Armada; Super Furry Animals; 22-20's; The Duke Spirit	The Who; Manic Street Preachers; Jet; The Stands; Electric Soft Parade; British Sea Power; Steve Harley & Cockney Rebel; Proud Mary; Leah Wood Group; Puzzle Muteson	David Bowie; The Charlatans; Snow Patrol; Delays; Suzanne Vega; The Ordinary Boys; Jerry Fish and the Mudbug Club

Being the first year of music on a Friday, the day began at 5pm.
The Charlatans returned from Rock Island 2002. They would play again in 2009.

In 2005 the event was released on DVD. However this only included headline performances from Stereophonics, and not from The Who or David Bowie. During 2005, Steve Harley & Cockney Rebel released their entire performance at the festival on DVD, titled Live at the Isle of Wight Festival.

In 2017 The Who released their performance on 2 cd and DVD/blu-ray on the Eagle Rock Entertainment label.
