= Barry Wickens =

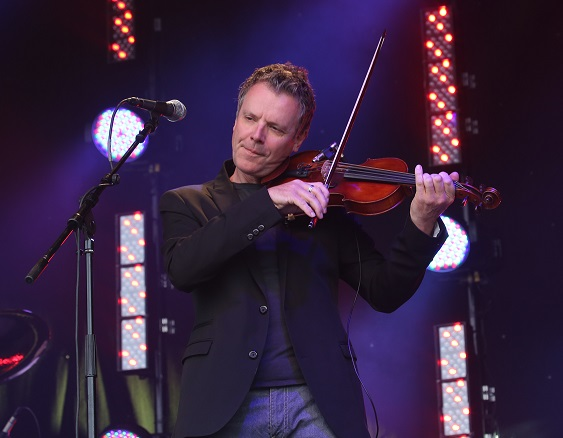

Background information
- Born: 23 May 1956 (age 69); Croydon, Surrey
- Occupation: Musician
- Instruments: Violin, guitar
- Formerly of: Steve Harley & Cockney Rebel, Immaculate Fools, Clann na Mara, The MacNamaras
- Website: barrywickens.com

Barry Wickens (born 23 May 1956) is an English musician, multi-instrumentalist and composer. Primarily a violinist and guitarist, he also plays mandolin, viola, Appalachian dulcimer (psaltery), dobro and keyboards. He is best known for being one of the longest-serving members of Steve Harley's rock group Cockney Rebel, and for being a former member of the pop group Immaculate Fools. He also taught violin and guitar in schools for Create Music, formerly Brighton & Hove Music & Arts, between 2001 and 2023.

Outside of Cockney Rebel and Immaculate Fools, Wickens has been involved in recording sessions for a number of artists, including John Martyn, Lick the Tins, Howard Jones, The River Detectives, Thrashing Doves, Martin Grech, along with TV and radio recordings of the Americana musicians The Milroys, and Folk Alliance Award nominee Diana Jones. He has also performed with Nick Pynn at a number of live events.

== Biography ==
Wickens was taught piano by his father at the age of seven, and became a member of Worcester Cathedral choir two years later. At the age of 10, Wickens moved to the Isle of Wight where he began learning the violin, and self-taught guitar. During his teenage years he explored various violin styles, and in 1972 received an Isle of Wight LEA Scholarship for funded violin studies. He went on to study violin, piano and composition at the Trinity College of Music in London. Between 1974 and 1978, he completed the violin performers course with piano and composition second studies at the college. In 1978 he became a Licentiate, as well as a Fellow of Trinity College of Music, and completed a composition course and basic film technique at London International Film School.

In 1977 he achieved a Leonard Smith Prize for Violin and Piano Duo, accompanied by Stephen Collings. The following year, 1978, Wickens gained an Arved Kurtz Prize for Violin Playing, the Beethoven Violin Prize, another Leonard Smith Prize for Violin and Piano Duo, as well as the Kantrovitch Prize for Solo Strings. Following his education Wickens began playing around small venues in London, and worked with a number of acts including Steve Knightly's band, Short Stories, and the English acoustic roots and folk duo Show of Hands.

Wickens first met Steve Harley in 1982, during which time Wickens was in Short Stories. In 1984, Wickens joined Steve Harley and Cockney Rebel as violinist and guitarist. Wickens' debut performance with the band was at London's Camden Palace in 1984. This show was professionally filmed and released on VHS under the name "Live from London". Although the band wouldn't go on tour again until the 'Comeback: All is Forgiven' tour of 1989, Wickens would continue to tour with the band until the early-1990s. The Brighton and Northampton concerts of the 1989 tour were also professionally filmed, and the footage edited to create a VHS titled "Steve Harley + Cockney Rebel: Live". He was involved in the recording of Harley's solo album Yes You Can, which was released in 1992. He performed on and co-wrote the track "Victim of Love", and also played violin on "Promises" and "The Lighthouse". Wickens left the band in 1992, and was replaced by Nick Pynn.

In 1989, Wickens had become a member of the pop band Immaculate Fools, who had achieved a couple of minor hits in the UK. During the late 1980s the band underwent a major line-up change, when Wickens joined the group along with three other new musicians. He recorded, co-produced, co-wrote and toured with the group, and during his time with the band released the albums Another Man's World (1990), The Toy Shop (1992), Woodhouse (1995) and Kiss and Punch (1996).

In 1997 Wickens formed the music production company Hydraphonic - a partnership project with Immaculate Fools' guitarist, Brian Betts. Using their writing, recording and production skills, the company has served various advertising agencies and publishers such as Sony/ATV, Universal Music and Sonoton. During the 1990s, he co-founded the contemporary Irish trio, Clann na Mara, alongside Paul Gillieron and J Eoin. Around the same time Wickens and Brian Aldwinckle formed the folk duo The MacNamaras.

After leaving Immaculate Fools in 1998, Wickens returned as a key member of Cockney Rebel. He has remained with the group since, performing as part of the full rock band line-up as well as the three-man acoustic shows. With the band he has performed at the Glastonbury Extravaganza, and the Isle of Wight Festival, as well as many of Europe's major rock festivals. The band's 2004 performance at Isle of Wight was released as a DVD in 2005.

Wickens featured playing violin and guitar on five tracks from Harley's 2003 live album Acoustic and Pure: Live, as well as all tracks on the 2004 live album Anytime! (A Live Set). He provided violin, guitar and backing vocals for Cockney Rebel's 2005 studio album The Quality of Mercy, as well as Harley's 2010 studio album Stranger Comes to Town. On the former album he helped co-write "Journey's End", and on the latter album co-wrote the lead single "Faith & Virtue" with Harley, and also received a writing credit on the track "Take the Men and the Horses Away". In 2018, Wickens released his debut solo album, Where Birdsong Meets Aeroplane, through his label Observation Records.

== Personal life ==
Wickens married Georgia Georgiou on 10 March 1990. They live in Brighton, East Sussex, with their two sons, Nicholas and Michael.

== Acclaim ==
Wickens' violin playing has been highly praised. Of his performance at Glastonbury Festival in 2005, eFestivals reviewer Karen Morrison noted that he performed a "stupendous exhibition in virtuoso violin - so good he does it twice at Harley's bidding." A performance at the O2 Academy at Bournemouth in November 2010 saw Bournemouth Echo writer Lucas Maybe describe Wickens as "fantastically sensual". Jo Davison of the Sheffield Star reviewed a November 2010 acoustic show from Cockney Rebel at the Memorial Hall, noting that "masterly violinist Barry Wickens, and James Lascelles on keyboards created something spine-shiveringly beautiful."

Alan Cooper, writing for the Portsmouth Evening News spoke of a Cockney Rebel concert at the King's Theatre during February 2011, noting "solos particularly from Wickens, were blissful." Martin Hutchinson, in a review of the band live at the HMV Ritz in Manchester during December 2011 for the Bolton News, noted "Wickens' violin solo in "The Lighthouse" was amongst the highlights of the show." In the York Press, Dan Bean reviewed a Cockney Rebel concert at the Harrogate Royal Hall in November 2013, and commented: "The band is uniformly excellent, but special praise goes to violinist and occasional guitarist Barry Wickens, whose extended solos received and deserved standing ovations."

== Discography ==
=== Solo career ===
- Where Birdsong Meets Aeroplane (2018)

=== Selected credits ===
- Steamboat Bluegrass Band - Bluegrass Express (1974)
- Crannog - Crannog (1980)
- Lick the Tins - Blind Man on a Flying Horse (1986)
- Thrashing Doves - Trouble in the Home (1989)
- The River Detectives - Saturday Night Sunday Morning (1989)
- Chanter - Lyra Celtica (1992)
- Ramona 55 featuring Angie Brown - "Anywhere Out of This World" (single, 1992)
- John Martyn - Couldn't Love You More (1992)
- Howard Jones - recording project (1993)
- Clann na Mara - Roots Run Deep (1995)
- Chanter - Chanter Live at the Victoria (1995)
- The MacNamaras - Celtic Dogs (1998)
- Aidan Burke - Feel the Bow (2004)
- Marcus Shelton - The Constant Fight with Contentment - (2005)
- Martin Grech - March of the Lonely (2007)
- Clann na Mara - The Enchanted Way – Live in Sete 2013 - (2013)

=== Immaculate Fools ===
- Another Man's World (album, 1990)
- The Toy Shop (album, 1992)
- Woodhouse (album, 1995)
- Kiss and Punch (album, 1996)
- No Gods... No Masters (compilation, 1998)

=== Steve Harley (and Cockney Rebel) ===
- Steve Harley - Yes You Can (album, 1992)
- Steve Harley & Cockney Rebel - Live at the BBC - (compilation, 1995)
- Steve Harley - Acoustic and Pure: Live (live album, 2003)
- The Steve Harley Band - Anytime! (A Live Set) (live album, 2004)
- Steve Harley & Cockney Rebel - The Quality of Mercy (album, 2005)
- Steve Harley - Stranger Comes to Town (album, 2010)
- Steve Harley & Cockney Rebel - Birmingham (Live with Orchestra & Choir) (live album, 2013)
- Steve Harley - "Ordinary People" (single, 2015)
- Steve Harley - Uncovered (album, 2020)
