= Pinnacle Entertainment (United Kingdom) =

British entertainment organization and record distributor

- Parent company: Windsong International
- Status: Defunct
- Distributor: Pinnacle
- Genre: Various
- Country of origin: United Kingdom
- Location: Orpington, England
- Official website: www.pinnacle-entertainment.co.uk

Pinnacle Entertainment was an entertainment group based in the United Kingdom spanning many divisions and primarily known as one of the UK's leading independent record labels and distributors.

== History ==
In 1996, Windsong/Pinnacle was purchased by the Zomba Group. When Zomba was subsequently purchased by BMG in 2002, Windsong/Pinnacle was moved under Bertelsmann's group Arvato AG. In January 2008, Windsong completed a buyout from Arvato, gaining independent ownership again. During the Great Recession, the company went into administration, effective December 3, 2008. It was then that Windsong Exports purchased the group and turned it into the UK's leading music distributor. Following that, the companies were usually referred to jointly as Windsong/Pinnacle.

== Divisions ==
=== Audio Services ===
Pinnacle's music division Audio Services Ltd., was primarily known for the distribution of over 400 independent record labels in the UK, but it also consisted of its own record label, label management for distributed labels, and marketing and sales divisions.

==== Record labels ====
- Pinnacle Records (artists include Flintlock, James Arthur Edwards)
- Firebird Records (artists included Nick Straker)
- Collins Classics – formed in 1989, closed in 1998.

=== Pinnacle Software ===
Formed in 1992, Pinnacle Software serves as a publishing company that represents many computer software companies such as 3MV, New Note, Shellshock and Beechwood. It provides retail, sales, marketing and logistics services to its publishing partners. Deals with Electronic Arts and Ubisoft helped introduce an exclusive distribution model to the UK Software market. Some brands associated with Pinnacle Software include FIFA, Harry Potter, The Lord of the Rings, Splinter Cell and Prince of Persia.

=== Gauntlet Entertainment ===
Formed in 1996, Gauntlet Entertainment was a distributor of video games. Formed by Peter Rezon to create a focused distribution model for video games, similar to what Pinnacle Software had been doing with other UK software companies. The distribution model they pioneered became the de facto model used by most major software publishers in the UK. Gauntlet Entertainment succeeded in doing so with ground breaking deals with Sierra, NovaLogic, THQ International, CDV Software and many other International Publishing houses. It has been associated with many of the top brands in the market place, including WWE Smackdown!, Cossacks, Rugrats, Warcraft, Half Life, Scooby Doo, Tetris and many more.

== See also ==
- List of record labels
