= James Lascelles =

English musician (born 1953)

The Honourable James Lascelles
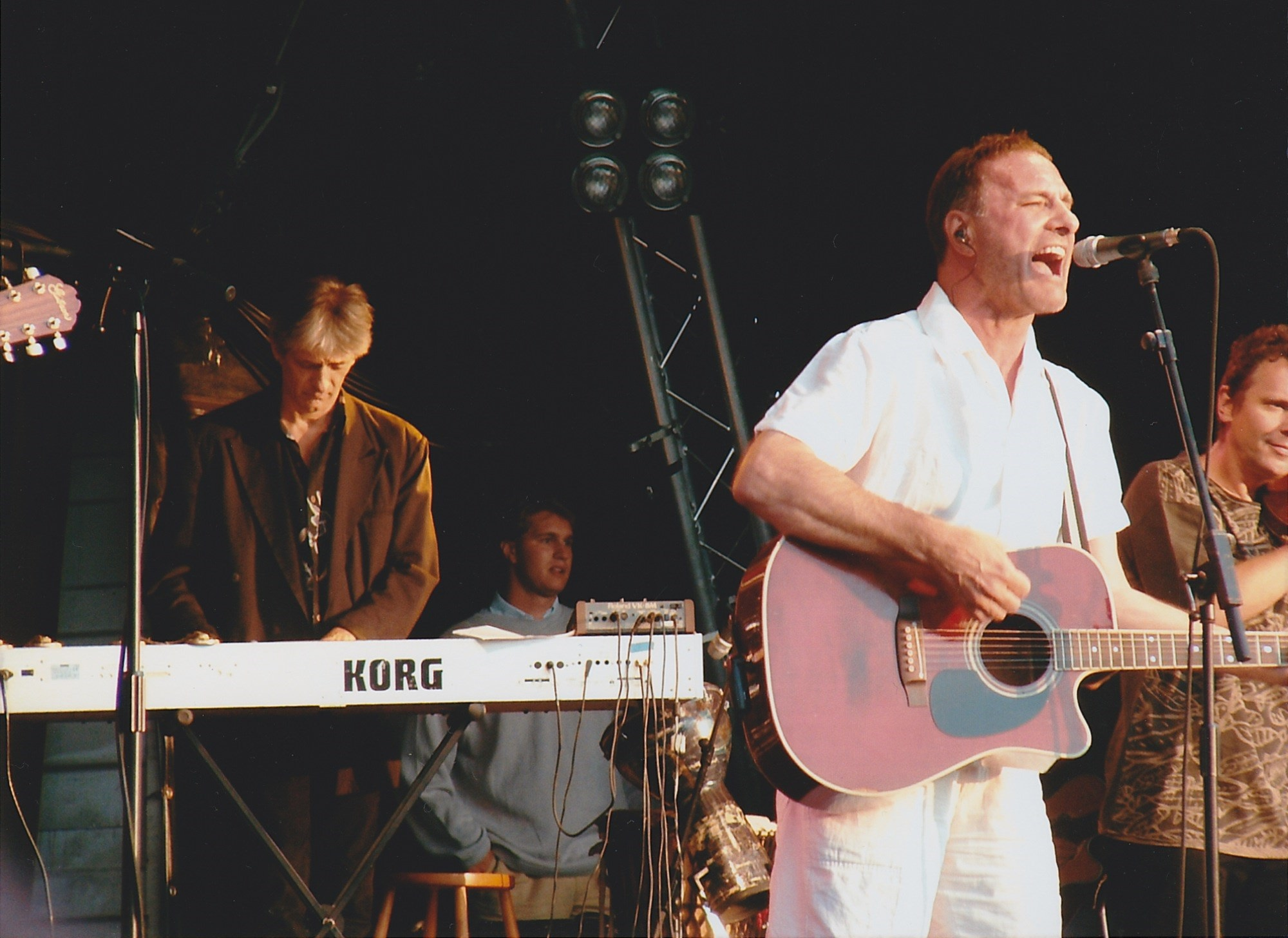
- Lascelles (left) performing with Steve Harley & Cockney Rebel at GuilFest in 2004
- Born: James Edward Lascelles; 5 October 1953 (age 73); Bayswater, London, England
- Occupation: Musician
- Spouses: Frederica Duhrssen (m. 1973; div. 1985); Lori Lee (m. 1985; div. 1996); Joy Elias-Rilwan (m. 1999)
- Children: 4
- Parents: George Lascelles, 7th Earl of Harewood; Marion Stein
- Website: www.jameslascelles.co.uk

James Edward Lascelles (born 5 October 1953) is an English musician and the second son of the 7th Earl of Harewood and his first wife, Marion. Lascelles is a second cousin to King Charles III.

== Music ==
When young, Lascelles had classical piano and drum lessons, and claims that "John Tavener 'taught' him to improvise" by performing duets on a church organ.

He then became interested in jazz, blues, and rock and roll.

== Global Village Trucking Company ==
Lascelles was a co-founder of the Global Village Trucking Company, known to its fans as "The Globs", in the early 1970s. The band, the road crew and their families all lived together in a commune in an old farmhouse in Sotherton, Suffolk, and undertook numerous benefit concerts and free festivals, playing extended free-form jams, making them a well known UK live act. The band shunned record companies, but played on the Greasy Truckers Live at Dingwalls Dance Hall benefit album at Dingwalls in 1973, and in November 1974 they recorded an eponymous album at Rockfield Studios, Monmouth, Wales.

In 1973 the BBC made a documentary about Global Village Trucking Company, their communal living and their aim to make it without a record company. The BBC updated the documentary for the What Happened Next series, shown in May 2008, which included their first gig in 30 years. This re-union led to other Global Village gigs at Glastonbury 2008 and other festivals.

== Later career ==
Lascelles then became a session musician, until in 1980 he joined The Breakfast Band, a jazz/funk band, which released two albums, Dolphin Ride and Waters Edge, and had a dance hit, "L.A. 14".

He then took an interest in world music, recording tribal music in North Africa and New Mexico, and releasing this on his own label, Tribal Music International. He also started composing music for theatre, The Footsbarn Travelling Theatre Company and Tiata Fahodzi, and film. Lascelles played keyboards, synthesisers, and percussion for Cockney Rebel between 2000 and 2023, and continues to perform this role with his own world music band, Talking Spirits, as of 2024. Lascelles also works with disaffected inner-city children. As of 2011 Lascelles was appearing with Mike Storey as "The Ivory Brothers".

== Discography ==
Global Village Trucking Company

- Greasy Truckers Live at Dingwalls Dance Hall (1974)
- Global Village Trucking Company (1975)

The Breakfast Band

- Dolphin Ride
- Waters Edge

Solo

- Turn off the Lights (2004) (Large 3)

Mandyleigh Storm

- Fire & Snow (2008)

== Notes and sources ==
British royalty
Preceded by Sebastian Lascelles	Line of succession to the British throne descended from Mary, daughter of George V	Succeeded by Rowan Lascelles
