= Robbie Gladwell =

British guitarist

Robert Gladwell (born 16 June 1950), also known as Dr Robert, is an English rock and blues guitarist from London.

== Music career ==
Gladwell has played with numerous bands in the past 50 years and is perhaps best known for being the lead guitarist for Steve Harley and Cockney Rebel, firstly between 1990 and 1991, and then from 1999 until 2022 (sans 2018), playing both electric and acoustic guitars, as well as mandolin, in both Harley's full rock band format (Cockney Rebel), and Harley's 2–5 piece acoustic sets.

He also played lead guitar for Suzi Quatro during the 1990s, as well as many other musical artistes, and has supported and toured with the Rolling Stones, B. B. King, Percy Sledge, Little Eva. Gladwell has also shared stages with David Gilmour and Tom Jones, among others.

Gladwell has also been the frontman of the eponymous Robbie Gladwell Band (sometimes also billed as "Robbie Gladwell and Friends" at larger venues) since the early-1980s. The band is an established act in the Suffolk area, and as of 2024 continues to perform multiple concerts per year, with many of these played to raise money for local charities.

Gladwell has worked as a consultant for Gibson and Fender Guitars and wrote regular features for Guitarist magazine. He has also designed a guitar for Vintage.

He currently runs a custom guitar workshop, Dr Robert's Guitar Surgery, in Sudbury in Suffolk.

== Books ==
Gladwell has written and published a number of books on guitar repairs and customising:

- Guitar Electronics and Customizing (1994)
- Studio Recording Guitar Basics – Four Pack (2002)
- Basic Kit Repair (2010)>

== Personal life ==
Gladwell married singer-songwriter Sheri Kershaw in 1970, but the couple later divorced. He has five children, two of whom sing or play music. He married Julie Hill in August 2008. They perform together in the Robbie Gladwell band.
