= Make Me Smile – The Best of Steve Harley and Cockney Rebel =

Compilation album by Steve Harley & Cockney Rebel
- Released: 27 April 1992
- Genre: Rock
- Length: 73:25
- Label: EMI

Steve Harley & Cockney Rebel chronology
Greatest Hits (1987)	Make Me Smile – The Best of Steve Harley and Cockney Rebel (1992)	Yes You Can (1992)

Make Me Smile – The Best of Steve Harley and Cockney Rebel is a compilation album by the British band Steve Harley & Cockney Rebel, released by EMI on 27 April 1992.

== Background ==
Harley was approached by EMI to personally select the 16 tracks featured on Make Me Smile – The Best of Steve Harley and Cockney Rebel. Harley told the Newcastle Evening Chronicle in 1992, "I have been on the road for three years [since returning to touring in 1989], so I know which ones people prefer. It's a pretty good retrospective." Harley added to Record Collector, "There is at least one track from every album I ever made. I can't stop EMI, they can licence what they own to anyone they like. I have no thoughts on it at all. It's the past. I get paid."

To coincide with the compilation's release and the band's upcoming UK tour, EMI re-issued "Make Me Smile (Come Up and See Me)" as a single. The album failed to enter the UK Albums Chart, but the single reached No. 46 in the UK Singles Chart and remained in the top 100 for two weeks.

== Critical reception ==
Professional ratings
Review scores
Source	Rating
The Encyclopedia of Popular Music	3/4 stars
Select	1/5 stars

Upon its release, Peter Kinghorn of the Newcastle Evening Chronicle commented, "Compiled with loving care by Steve himself, this anthology has some knockout tracks – all of which have grown in stature with the passing of time." Colin Wilson of the Eastern Daily Press praised it as a "fab collection" that "traces Harley's career [and] features all of his best loved hits". He added, "I find it inexplicable that Harley should have made so much formidable music in so short a space of time and abruptly ceased to function." Adam Higginbotham of Select was negative in his review, writing, "Apart from their indisputable high point, the superb 'Make Me Smile', the material produced at the peak of their popularity in the mid-'70s is now acutely embarrassing."

== Track listing ==
All tracks are written by Steve Harley, except "Freedom's Prisoner" by Harley and Jimmy Horowitz, "Here Comes the Sun" by George Harrison and "Roll the Dice" by Harley and Jo Partridge.

No.	Title	Length
1.	"Mr. Soft"	3:21
2.	"Riding the Waves (For Virginia Woolf)"	4:34
3.	"Irresistible" (Remix)	5:17
4.	"Mr. Raffles (Man, It Was Mean)"	4:34
5.	"Freedom's Prisoner"	3:54
6.	"Hideaway"	3:51
7.	"Judy Teen"	3:45
8.	"Best Years of Our Lives" (Live)	5:10
9.	"Make Me Smile (Come Up and See Me)"	4:01
10.	"If This Is Love (Give Me More)" (Live)	5:54
11.	"Here Comes the Sun"	3:00
12.	"Sebastian"	6:58
13.	"Roll the Dice"	3:29
14.	"Understand"	7:15
15.	"(I Believe) Love's a Prima Donna"	4:10
16.	"Tumbling Down"	5:48

== Personnel ==
Production

- Steve Harley – producer (tracks 1–5, 7–11, 14–16)
- Alan Parsons – producer (tracks 1, 4, 7, 9, 16)
- Mickie Most – producer (track 3)
- Stuart Breed – remixer (track 3)
- Jimmy Horowitz – producer (track 5)
- Neil Harrison – producer (tracks 6, 12)
- Michael J. Jackson – producer (track 13)

Other

- Michael Heatley – liner notes

== Charts ==
Chart (2024)	Peak position
UK Album Downloads Chart (OCC)	54
