= Greatest Hits (Steve Harley and Cockney Rebel album) =

Greatest hits album by Steve Harley & Cockney Rebel
- Released: 12 October 1987
- Genre: Rock
- Label: EMI

Steve Harley & Cockney Rebel chronology
The Best of Steve Harley and Cockney Rebel (1980)	Greatest Hits (1987)	Make Me Smile – The Best of Steve Harley and Cockney Rebel (1992)

Greatest Hits is a compilation album by the British band Steve Harley & Cockney Rebel, released by EMI on 12 October 1987.

== Background ==
Greatest Hits was originally released on CD format only on 12 October 1987. It was the first Steve Harley & Cockney Rebel compilation to be released by EMI since 1980's The Best of Steve Harley and Cockney Rebel and was also the band's first compilation to be released on CD. Although the compilation did not make an appearance in the UK Albums Chart, it had sold over 10,000 copies by April 1988 and ranked among the best selling albums of EMI's mid-price range.

EMI then released the compilation on vinyl and cassette formats on 3 May 1988, again as part of their mid-price range. In addition to the encouraging sales of the CD, EMI were also prompted by renewed interest in the band following the use of their 1974 song "Mr. Soft" in a television advert for Trebor Softmints.

The CD version features fifteen tracks spanning from 1973 to 1978. The vinyl and cassette editions contain twelve tracks, omitting "(Love) Compared with You", "Riding the Waves (For Virginia Woolf)" and "Freedom's Prisoner".

== Critical reception ==
Professional ratings
Review scores
Source	Rating
AllMusic	4/5 stars
NME	8/10

Upon its release, Mark Sinker of NME stated: "[Harley] was five years late on the eccentric cameo Englandisms that Bowie and the Kinks had defined and exhausted. He had a sillier speech defect than Ian Hunter, and a more absurdly elevated sense of rock's theatrical possibilities. He was camper than Queen could be, and far less forgiveable than Ferry. And still, for all that, he wrote a wicked little melodrama of a tune. The art-pomp of most of these songs has exactly the wistful tinge that Ray Davies had lost, by the early '70s. I don't suppose we noticed that. We were too busy thinking ourselves smart for knowing what he was on about, or hating him for not being real ROCK. I'm obviously going senile, but this is a brilliant record."

Donald A. Guarisco of AllMusic retrospectively wrote: "Of all the glam-rock acts to hit it big in England during the 1970s, Steve Harley & Cockney Rebel were second only to David Bowie himself in terms of artsy ambition. Tunes like "Judy Teen" and "Love's a Prima Donna" may have been poppy enough to sail into the English singles charts, but they also boasted unconventional instrumentation and poetic lyrics with lots of surreal, Bob Dylan-esque wordplay. The result was a string of intelligent yet catchy singles, all of which are compiled on this collection. Greatest Hits also includes a generous array of album favorites, and highlights Harley's oft-underrated skill with ballads. The only real downside is that its surprisingly short track list omits some early gems: the compilers could have easily thrown in another two or three songs to fully flesh out the track selection. Despite this quibble, Greatest Hits is a fine collection and makes a great introduction to this group's ambitious, artsy style of pop."

== Track listing ==
All songs written by Steve Harley except "Here Comes the Sun" by George Harrison and "Freedom's Prisoner" by Harley and Jimmy Horowitz.

=== 1987 CD version ===
No.	Title	Length
1.	"Mad, Mad, Moonlight"	5:36
2.	"Mr. Soft"	3:17
3.	"Sebastian"	5:42
4.	"Judy Teen"	3:41
5.	"(Love) Compared with You"	4:20
6.	"Mr. Raffles (Man It Was Mean)"	4:29
7.	"Riding the Waves (For Virginia Woolf)"	4:32
8.	"Here Comes the Sun"	2:58
9.	"Make Me Smile (Come Up and See Me)"	3:58
10.	"Best Years Of Our Lives"	5:30
11.	"Psychomodo"	4:01
12.	"Sling It"	2:39
13.	"Freedom's Prisoner"	3:49
14.	"(I Believe) Love's a Prima Donna"	4:08
15.	"Tumbling Down"	5:55

=== 1988 LP/Cassette version ===
No.	Title	Length
1.	"Mad, Mad, Moonlight"	5:36
2.	"Mr. Soft"	3:17
3.	"Sebastian"	5:42
4.	"Judy Teen"	3:41
5.	"Mr. Raffles (Man It Was Mean)"	4:29
6.	"Here Comes the Sun"	2:58
7.	"Make Me Smile (Come Up and See Me)"	3:58
8.	"Best Years Of Our Lives"	5:30
9.	"Psychomodo"	4:01
10.	"Sling It"	2:39
11.	"(I Believe) Love's a Prima Donna"	4:08
12.	"Tumbling Down"	5:55
