= Face to Face: A Live Recording =

Live album by Steve Harley & Cockney Rebel
- Released: 8 July 1977
- Recorded: December 1976–January 1977
- Genre: Rock
- Length: 73:11
- Label: EMI
- Producer: Steve Harley; Tony Clark

Steve Harley & Cockney Rebel chronology
Love's a Prima Donna (1976)	Face to Face: A Live Recording (1977)	Hobo with a Grin (1978)

Singles from Face to Face: A Live Recording
- 1. "The Best Years of Our Lives" Released: 12 August 1977

Face to Face: A Live Recording is a live album by Steve Harley & Cockney Rebel, released by EMI on 8 July 1977. It was produced by Steve Harley and Tony Clark.

== Background ==
Following the release of their sixth studio album Love's a Prima Donna, Steve Harley & Cockney Rebel embarked on an eight-date UK tour in December 1976. For the tour, Jo Partridge replaced guitarist Jim Cregan, who had left the band after the recording of Love's a Prima Donna to join Rod Stewart's touring band. Speaking to Melody Maker in 1977, Harley said of the tour, "We did eight concerts and every night was great. I'm not just saying that. Jimmy had left to join Rod Stewart's band and Jo Partridge brought new energy. It was our fourth major tour and the fans were on my side from the word go. They're a great audience. It was the best concert tour I've done in my life. I've never enjoyed playing so much in my career."

Prior to the tour, Harley decided to have some of the concerts recorded for a potential live album release. The concerts at London's Hammersmith Odeon, Birmingham Odeon, Glasgow Apollo and Newcastle City Hall were recorded using the mobile recording studios RAK Mobile and La Maison Rouge. On 12 February 1977, the band played a one-off charity concert at the London Rainbow in aid of the homeless in Northern Ireland, and this show was also recorded. A few days ahead of the Rainbow show, Harley told Melody Maker that he was in the process of listening to the tracks recorded on the December tour. Over the following weeks, Harley worked on mixing the recordings and selecting the best tracks, with Tony Clark serving as the engineer and co-producer. The tracks were mixed at both Abbey Road Studios and Air Studios in London, and were later mastered by Ken Perry at Capitol Studios in Los Angeles.

Speaking of the upcoming album to Record Mirror, Harley said,

"Quite frankly, I've always been much bigger as a live performer than I have on plastic. It will probably be my next album release. Basically it will be the whole of the one-and-a-half hour show I did on the last tour. We recorded [various] concerts, so there are plenty of versions of each song to choose from and make a good album. The results of what has been mixed so far have turned out excellently. I have cheated a little bit, though I think quite justifiably so. I altered the running order a bit, although I don't think that most people who went to the concerts will even notice. The reason for the change is that a running order which seems right for a show can be nonsense on plastic. Each side of each of the two records has to have a beginning and an end, which in all means eight ends-and-beginnings. In concert you don't have that problem. I've also cheated a tiny amount by erasing the odd bum note. Out of five versions of a song that I've got to choose from, there will always be one where the vocal's in tune, the guitar solo sounds great and everything else is just about perfect, but even then there's always some little thing that's off and I'm not going to spoil a good track by allowing an obvious bum note on it when that can be avoided."

Comparing the live recordings with the original studio versions of the songs performed, Harley added, "They knock spots off them. In most cases they're 10 times better." However, Harley did admit he hadn't enjoyed the process of mixing the tracks, "To me, it's a very uncreative operation. It's only, after all, engineering and engineering is an evil, and not particularly exciting, necessity." He added to Record Mirror in July 1977, "The big thing for me was to get the audiences right. I wanted it to sound like one concert, when in fact, it's culled from different halls. The audience clapping on the opening cut is 3,500 people recorded in Birmingham, while the next cut is 2,200 in Newcastle. I didn't want any of that stuff where it sounds different from cut to cut or you fade out the applause. I wanted this to sound like one show and as live as it could be."

The selected songs for Face to Face: A Live Recording were representative of the band's entire show on their December 1976 tour, but the running order was changed and two tracks, "Innocence and Guilt" and "Is It True What They Say?", were omitted altogether as it was felt they did not translate well onto vinyl.

Once the mixing of the live recordings was completed, Harley disbanded Cockney Rebel, with the news being announced in the press on 5 July 1977. Harley told the Daily Mirror, "They understand that Steve Harley & Cockney Rebel have come to the end of an era – that is partly why I made the live album – and that I have to go on and do other things." Harley signed to EMI for a further three years and began recording his debut solo album Hobo with a Grin.

== Release ==
Face to Face: A Live Recording was released by EMI Records as a double-LP on 8 July 1977. The album reached number 40 in the UK Albums Chart and remained in the top 50 for four weeks. To promote the album, a live single was released in August, featuring "The Best Years of Our Lives" as the A-side and "Tumbling Down" as the B-side.

The album received its first CD release by EMI in 1997, but in the Netherlands only. In 2000, BGO Records released a remastered version of the album on CD in the UK and Europe.

== Critical reception ==
Professional ratings
Review scores
Source	Rating
Record Mirror	(sides 1+2) (sides 3+4)
Sounds	4/5 stars

Upon its release, Bill Mac of the Greenock Telegraph noted that the album "shows just how a live concert can be translated successfully onto vinyl". Mike Pryce of the Worcester Evening News remarked, "The content is virtually the Cockney Rebel stage act, minus the visually exciting but sound-wise ordinary 'Innocence and Guilt'. The opener 'Here Comes the Sun' is a lot better than the studio version and this carries on throughout the collection: better altogether than a studio feel. Highlights for me [are] the singalong 'Best Years of Our Lives' and 'Make Me Smile, although the whole lot has a magic all its own." Adrian Kibbler of the Bromsgrove Messenger believed that the album is a "must for the [fans] and even the more objective critic will recognise it as an album well worth adding to any collection of modern contemporary pop music". Dick Tatham of the Dundee Courier & Advertiser praised it as an "excellent double album".

Geoff Barton of Sounds wrote, "I count several Rebel concerts to be amongst the most emotional and enjoyable I've ever seen. Side one gets off to a slow start, non-atmospheric and yawn-prompting, Cockney Rebel sounding curiously leaden. Side two suffers from the same kind of problems. By contrast, side three and four are magnificent, compulsive. The involvement builds and builds until, towards the end, everyone sings along in fine football chorus tradition. Highly charged, sincere, spine-tingling stuff. The latter half of Face To Face is quite magical, strikes a deep emotional chord. And I can't think of many albums that do that, can you?" Sheila Prophet of Record Mirror said, "Whatever you might think of Harley and his ego, there's no doubt that onstage, it makes him into a magnificent, riveting performer. Every time I've seen him live, the effect was the same – total involvement. But does this involvement come over on record? Well, side one starts off pretty unpromisingly. It picks up a bit, but it's still fairly routine stuff. Where is Harley the Presence? Well, he's there on side two, but in his least acceptable form. Without his dramatic stage appearance, his vocals sound ridiculously overwrought. Oh dear. But wait – between side two and three, something magic has happened. Harley has taken over and suddenly, his whole ego trip seems almost justified. He's the central figure, with the audience as his backing band."

Peter Trollope of the Liverpool Echo wrote, "The first two sides are deadweight, definitely music to do something else to. However, Sides Three and Four sort of grab you by the throat." John Stacey of the Bolton Evening News summarised, "Unfortunately the man's charisma cannot be adequately captured on record, but the music's excellent and it's one of the better live recordings." Angus MacKinnon of the NME noted that while Harley was an "undeniably attractive performer in the flesh", with his "limp-wristed buffoonery and studied laconic gesturing", he "doesn't benefit greatly from being recorded live". He described the album as "well recorded", but felt that none of the songs "succeed in upstaging their studio counterparts". Ray Coleman of Melody Maker said that the "hansomely packaged" album has some "good tracks, certainly", but considered it to be a "disappointing surprise" overall. He praised the band as live performers, capable of "marvellously nerve-racking concert[s] which hit highs and lows, and touched all the raw emotion that good pop should", but believed Face to Face was hampered by Harley's choice of using tracks from various shows. He wrote, "Thus, there's no moment of togetherness running through all four sides. Harley has gone for the best performances of each song, and lumped them together, rather than do what he should have done: projected the best concert. There is merely a fair amount of audience screaming and a few words from the singer to separate this from the other albums on which the songs appear."

In the US, Billboard noted that the album "ranges from slow and midtempo R&B ballads to fast-paced rockers highlighted by Harley's soulful vocals". Steve Pond of the Los Angeles Times commented, "Face to Face is too uneven to make many new fans. Harley is at his best on material like 'Make Me Smile', where his vocal mannerisms and dramatic phrasing add punch and character. But on most of the album the vocals are strained rather than commanding, and the arrangements often lack the sparkle of the originals." The Chicago Daily News stated, "Harley and his group Cockney Rebel supposedly are very big in their native England, but you'd never know it from this tired live set. Not offensive nor ugly; also not passionate or feeling. Mere going through the motions."

=== Retrospective reviews ===
Professional ratings
Review scores
Source	Rating
AllMusic	2/5 stars

Dave Thompson of AllMusic retrospectively stated, "By 1977, [Harley] scarcely seemed to even remember the songs, so the audience sung half of them for him. Here his voice simply sounds affected... either that, or the poor lad has hiccups. And they don't go away. No complaints about the actual set list. Across four sides of vinyl, Harley has always been well aware of his own worth and delivers a show which is half greatest hits, half greatest bits. But the pale apologies for the epics, the perfunctory trawls through the classics, and the 'gee-it's-so-wonderful-to-be-here' simper which now passes for stage presence aren't simply inexcusable. They are embarrassing and, no matter how lustily the audience sings along with their favorites, you know that they won't be calling him 'Sebastian' ever again. 'Judy Teen' has left the building."

== Track listing ==
All tracks are written by Steve Harley except "Here Comes the Sun" by George Harrison.

No.	Title	Length
1.	"Here Comes the Sun"	3:26
2.	"(I Believe) Love's a Prima Donna"	4:50
3.	"Mad, Mad Moonlight"	5:15
4.	"Red is a Mean, Mean Colour"	5:44
5.	"Sweet Dreams"	2:39
6.	"Finally a Card Came"	1:57
7.	"Psychomodo"	5:12
8.	"If This Is Love (Give Me More)"	5:50
9.	"The Best Years of Our Lives"	5:01
10.	"(Love) Compared with You"	4:48
11.	"Mr. Soft"	3:15
12.	"Sebastian"	10:44
13.	"Seeking a Love"	1:17
14.	"Tumbling Down"	6:34
15.	"Make Me Smile (Come Up and See Me)"	6:45

== Personnel ==
Steve Harley & Cockney Rebel

- Steve Harley – vocals
- Jo Partridge – lead guitar
- Duncan Mackay – keyboards
- George Ford – bass guitar
- Stuart Elliott – drums
- Lindsey Elliott – percussion

Additional musicians

- Tony Rivers – backing vocals
- John G. Perry – backing vocals
- Stuart Calver – backing vocals

Production

- Steve Harley – producer
- Tony Clark – engineer, co-producer
- David Jacobson – live sound
- Ken Perry – mastering

Sleeve

- Hipgnosis – original sleeve design
- Garrod & Lofthouse – printing

== Charts ==
Chart (1977)	Peak position
UK Albums Chart	40
US Record World 151-200 Album Chart	154
