= The Best of Steve Harley and Cockney Rebel =

Compilation album by Steve Harley & Cockney Rebel
- Released: September 1980; May 1982 (re-issue)
- Genre: Pop, rock
- Length: 57:44
- Label: EMI Records/Fame

Steve Harley & Cockney Rebel chronology
The Candidate (1979)	The Best of Steve Harley and Cockney Rebel (1980)	Greatest Hits (1987)

The Best of Steve Harley and Cockney Rebel is a compilation album by Steve Harley & Cockney Rebel, released by EMI in September 1980. It features material from the original line-up of Cockney Rebel, the Steve Harley & Cockney Rebel line-up, and two tracks from Harley's solo career.

== Background ==
Following the disappointing sales of his second solo album The Candidate in 1979, EMI Records dropped Harley from their label. A year later, EMI released a compilation album of Steve Harley & Cockney Rebel's work. Colin Miles was selected to compile the album and The Best of Steve Harley and Cockney Rebel was released in September 1980 as the band's first compilation to be released in the UK. The compilation features twelve tracks spanning from 1973 to 1978. Six are Cockney Rebel tracks from 1973 to 1974, four are Steve Harley & Cockney Rebel tracks from 1975 to 1976, and two are from Harley's solo career, which were 1974's "Big Big Deal" and 1978's "Riding the Waves (For Virginia Woolf)". Of the chosen inclusions, "Cavaliers" and "Riding the Waves (For Virginia Woolf)" were never released as singles.

To promote the compilation, EMI re-issued the band's 1975 UK number one hit "Make Me Smile (Come Up and See Me)" as a 7-inch single on 3 October 1980, with "Sebastian" as the B-side. The single came with a full picture sleeve, which featured the same photographs of Cockney Rebel, on both the front and back of the sleeve, as would appear on the sleeve of the compilation album. Like the album, the single did not make a chart appearance in the UK.

After the release of the compilation, Harley and a new line-up of Cockney Rebel embarked on a UK Christmas tour. During this tour, Harley introduced three new songs; "Warm My Cold Heart", "I Can Be Anyone" and "Such is Life", as well as a reggae-version of "Mr. Soft".

== Release ==
The album was released by EMI on vinyl and cassette in the UK, the Netherlands, Germany, Portugal, and Australia. The front cover features a photograph of the original Cockney Rebel line-up and the back sleeve features a photograph of the Steve Harley & Cockney Rebel line-up. Both photographs were taken by Mick Rock. The back sleeve biography and overview was written in 1980 by Chris Welch.

In May 1982, the compilation was reissued in the UK on EMI's new mid-price label, Fame.

== Critical reception ==
Professional ratings
Review scores
Source	Rating
Hull Daily Mail	4/5 stars

Upon its release, Mike Nicholls of Record Mirror felt the compilation "well lives up to its name". He wrote, "Present and correct are [the] singles and early epics 'Sebastian' and 'Tumbling Down', and another half dozen album cuts which kept the flag of style and individuality flying throughout the predominantly barren early seventies." James Belsey of the Bristol Evening Post stated, "This well-chosen compilation - good liner notes too - shows the enduring quality of cuts like 'Make Me Smile', 'Judy Teen', 'Mr Raffles' and the classic 'Sebastian'." Alan Burgess of the Hull Daily Mail described Harley as one of the "most essential pop stars of the early 1970s" and felt that "today Cockney Rebel's music still stands tall". He commented, "'Make Me Smile' is a classic pop tune, and 'Mr. Soft' and 'Psychomodo' illustrate a unique and original rhythmic jerk crowned by Harley's highly derivative, but unmistakable warble."

John Miles of the Eastern Evening News praised it as "one of the best compilation albums I've heard for a long time" and one that "highlights through a wide range of moods the fine creative talent of Harley". He picked the "powerful" "Sebastian" as his "top track" for its "wonderful feeling of mystery and haunting beauty". A reviewer for the Shropshire Star wrote, "This album charts the progress, moods and reformation of one of the most inspired artists of the mid-Seventies. Harley's successes and failures on one album from the bouncy 'Judy Teen' through 'Psychomodo' to the captivating 'Sebastian'." Roy Stone of the South Wales Argus concluded, "While listening to his old songs is a pleasant little nostalgia trip - some of them have a lot of bounce and infectious enthusiasm - in the aftermath of punk power Harley seems less a rebel than a relic."

== Track listing ==
All songs written and composed by Steve Harley, except "Here Comes the Sun" composed by George Harrison.

No.	Title	Length
1.	"Make Me Smile (Come Up and See Me)"	3:56
2.	"Big Big Deal"	4:30
3.	"Psychomodo"	4:00
4.	"Mr. Soft"	3:18
5.	"Judy Teen"	3:39
6.	"Cavaliers"	8:07
7.	"Sebastian"	6:50
8.	"Here Comes the Sun"	2:56
9.	"Riding the Waves (For Virginia Woolf)"	4:27
10.	"Black or White"	5:43
11.	"Mr. Raffles (Man, It Was Mean)"	4:32
12.	"Tumbling Down"	5:46

== Personnel ==
- Steve Harley – vocals (all tracks)
- Jean Paul-Crocker – electric violin, guitar (tracks 3–7, 12)
- Milton Reame-James – keyboards (tracks 3–7, 12)
- Paul Jeffreys – Fender bass (tracks 3–7, 12)
- Jim Cregan – guitar (tracks 1, 8, 10–11)
- Duncan MacKay – keyboards (tracks 1, 8, 10–11), electric piano/synthesizer (track 9)
- George Ford – bass (tracks 1, 8, 10–11)
- Stuart Elliott – drums, percussion (tracks 1–8, 10–12)
- Lindsay Elliott – percussion (tracks 1, 3–8, 10–12)
- Jo Partridge – acoustic guitar (track 9), electric lead solo (track 9)
- Greg Poree – electric guitar (track 9)
- Bill Payne – acoustic piano (track 9)
- Bob Glaub – bass (track 9)
- Rick Shlosser – drums (track 9)
- Bill Champlin, Bobby Kimball, Tommy Kelly – backing vocals (track 9)

Production

- Steve Harley – producer (tracks 1–6, 8–12)
- Alan Parsons – producer (tracks 1, 3–6, 11–12)
- Neil Harrison – producer (tracks 7)
- Harry Moss – cutting engineer

Sleeve

- Adam Yeldham – design and artwork
- Colin Miles – sleeve concept
- Mick Rock – photography
