= Uncovered (Steve Harley album) =

Studio album by Steve Harley
- Released: 21 February 2020
- Length: 46:06
- Label: Absolute; Comeuppance Ltd
- Producer: Steve Harley; Matt Butler (co-producer)

Steve Harley chronology
Birmingham (Live with Orchestra & Choir) (2013)	Uncovered (2020)

Singles from Uncovered
- 1. "I've Just Seen a Face" Released: 4 February 2020; 2. "Out of Time" Released: 18 September 2020

Uncovered is the sixth and final solo studio album from English singer-songwriter Steve Harley, released on 21 February 2020.

== Background ==
"It's not a covers album. I don't see the point of most covers. They usually sound the same as the originals. We like to call them interpretations. They're nothing like the originals."

— Steve Harley discussing the album's concept.

Uncovered was first announced in a press release on 29 August 2019. In June 2019, Harley spent a 10-day residency with engineer and co-producer Matt Butler at Rockfield Studios, where 12 tracks were recorded with a team of musicians made up of Martin Simpson, Oli Hayhurst, Cockney Rebel member Barry Wickens and Thomas Hooper. Harley, who had long been an admirer of his playing and songwriting, had wanted to work with Simpson and invited him to take part in the recording of Uncovered. Butler recommended Hayhurst and Hooper after Harley expressed his desire to have some new musicians around to provide him with fresh inspiration.

The musicians accompanied Harley and Butler at the studio for approximately six to seven days. Harley commented of the sessions, "These guys played some fabulous, beautiful music. I was inspired by their talents. I was roaring with stamina and passion when I went in to sing the final versions. The hunger and desire to perform was almost primitive." Harley recorded the vocals for all of the tracks in a day and a half.

In August, backing vocals performed by Genevieve Sylva and Jenny Wallace were recorded for some of the tracks at Yellow Shark Studios in Cheltenham. Harley and Butler also travelled to Vosound Studios in Volendam to record a string quartet on a few tracks using arrangements composed by Thomas Tol.

The songs on Uncovered were selected from those that Harley has performed and sung privately at home for many years and wished he had written. In the liner notes for Uncovered, Harley revealed: "I play guitar for hours most days I'm at home. And I play songs I respect deeply and wish I had written. Some of those songs are included here. Lyrics full of imagery, philosophy and wit abound amongst them." Harley wanted Uncovered to be entirely acoustic, with no keyboards or electronic instruments: "I had long planned to record an all-acoustic album, with a band consisting solely of acoustic guitar specialists, other string players and a percussionist."

Uncovered was recorded without the use of equalization. Harley told BBC Radio, "We went in with the best acoustic instruments money can buy, the best microphones, the best studio, the best recording equipment, the best musicians and the best engineer. Now I've got all that going for me, why would I let [the engineer] meddle? I wanted it to sound like I'm in your living room when you play it through your speakers. The voice is up front and everything around me is as if we were playing in your house. No effects. It's as organic and natural as a recording could possibly be, I'm really proud of that. My engineer Matt Butler is the man who made it sound so fabulous."

Harley was pleased with the final product and remarked in 2020, "It might be my finest hour, the Uncovered album. It's not for me to judge, but I have my feelings."

== Songs ==
The album contains two tracks written by Harley. The first is a re-recording of "(Love) Compared with You", which was originally recorded by Steve Harley & Cockney Rebel in 1976 for Love's a Prima Donna. The version for Uncovered features a newly written third verse. Harley revealed to BBC Radio 2's Johnnie Walker: "I've sung the song [live] many hundreds of times since 1976 [and] every time I'm thinking 'Why are you repeating [the first] verse? Why didn't you write a third verse? Were you lazy? Were you out of words?' 45 years later and I thought the song deserved an update."

The other Harley composition, "Only You", previously featured in the majority of Harley's two-man acoustic sets between 1998 and 2002. A studio version was never recorded at the time, although a live recording was included on 1999's Stripped to the Bare Bones. The song was recorded for Uncovered at Butler's suggestion.

Harley rediscovered David Bowie's "Absolute Beginners" while on tour with Mike Garson in 2017: "I made friends with Mike and then went on tour with him [for] five or six shows around the UK as a guest singer. They threw some Bowie at me and one was "Absolute Beginners", [which] I didn't really know very well. I knew it was a great song from a useless film. It's very musical, it's all major sevenths and diminished chords."

Speaking to Record Collector on Hot Chocolate's "Emma", Harley commented: "Around the time of my first hit, "Judy Teen", I saw Errol singing this on Top of the Pops. We think of Hot Chocolate as a catchy pop band, but this is so mysterious. Why? It's a story of suicide. It's not "You Sexy Thing"; it's a work of poetic intrigue." Speaking to BBC Radio Solent, Harley added: "Errol was a great lyricist and this is a heartbreaking story." The song's guitar solo is performed by former Cockney Rebel member Jim Cregan.

Harley told BBC Radio Cornwall of The Beatles' "I've Just Seen a Face": "It's pure Paul McCartney. It's Paul alone on this, it's his beautiful lyric. It's all about serendipity, there's more to it than meets the eye. It's magical." Of "Lost Myself", Harley described it as "the song of songs in this collection", a "desperate cri de coeur which I truly wish I had written", and one which he "get[s] very moved by".

"Star of Belle Isle" is a duet with Scottish singer-songwriter Eddi Reader. Harley was introduced to the song through the Bob Dylan version, which appeared on the 1970 album Self Portrait: "Belle Isle touched me immediately. The Dylan version always stayed with me. It's a lovely romantic story." Harley's version features two additional verses not included in Dylan's recording: "I knew the song well for years but also knew from a folk aficionado that two verses were missing from every version you ever hear. It took me months of research but I finally tracked them down. I found an elderly Scottish gentleman in a pub in Scotland singing "Star of Belle Isle" with these two extra verses." Harley had long been a fan of Reader's work and met her backstage at one her concerts in 2019. Later in the year he approached her regarding the recording of the song as a duet, to which she agreed. Harley then travelled to Gloworm Studio in Glasgow to record with her. Speaking to The Arts Show, Harley commented: "To have someone of her caliber share a song with me [is] very humbling."

Harley also recorded the Frankie Valli/Walker Brothers song "The Sun Ain't Gonna Shine (Anymore)" for Uncovered, but it was not included in the final track-listing.

== Singles ==
"I've Just Seen a Face" was released as a single on 4 February 2020. A music video was released on YouTube on 7 February. "Out of Time" was released as the album's second single on 18 September.

== Release ==
In a November 2022 interview with hi-fi+, Harley revealed the album had sold over 7,000 copies. He added, "I got my money back – it was an expensive album to make. I spared nothing – two weeks at Rockfield with top-line musicians."

== Tour ==
The release of Uncovered was supported by a UK and European tour. Due to other commitments, Simpson was unable to join the band and he recommended David Delarre in his place. The touring band, billed as the Steve Harley Acoustic Band, was made up of Harley, Delarre, Wickens and Heyhurst. In March 2020, all upcoming shows were postponed due to the COVID-19 pandemic, with only the first nine shows played as planned. The concerts resumed in August 2021, with the rescheduled 2020 tour starting in May 2022, and finishing in July. Delarre and Hayhurst later took over from Robbie Gladwell and Kuma Harada as the respective lead guitarist and bassist for Harley's rock band format (Cockney Rebel) beginning in December 2022. This continued for the April 2023 Benelux rock band shows, amid Gladwell's ongoing professional commitments which precluded his involvement in the tour, and Harada's March 2023 death, respectively. The effects of this would however be mitigated when Harley cancelled his November-December 2023 dates (for medical reasons) in the September of that year.

== Critical reception ==
Professional ratings
Review scores
Source	Rating
Classic Rock	7/10 stars
Record Collector	4/5 stars
RnR	4/5 stars

Upon its release, Paul Moody of Classic Rock described Uncovered as an "eclectic collection" and added: "Highlights include a rootsy rendition of the Stones' "Out of Time" and a poignant version of Bowie's "Absolute Beginners", but Harley's obvious love of the source material shines throughout." Nick Dalton of Record Collector considered the album "a thing of great beauty", which contains "the air of the acoustic trio [Harley] often tours with" and "delicate, yet often driven versions of favourite songs".

Malcolm Smith of Fireworks felt Uncovered was "generally an unqualified success". He described Harley's choice of material as "relatively obscure" and "all [being] very engaging pieces that suit Harley's very individualistic approach". Smith also praised the album's "simplicity" and Harley's vocals for "convey[ing] a real sense of emotion and drama". He highlighted "Star of Belle Isle" as a "standout cut". Andrew Darlington of RnR wrote: "The atmosphere seeps in even when you don't expect it to, until you're submerged in it. Everyone's entitled to do one Pin Ups. This is Steve's." He picked "Lost Myself", "I've Just Seen a Face" and "When I Paint My Masterpiece" as some of the album's standouts.

== Track listing ==
Uncovered track listing
No.	Title	Writer(s)	Length
1.	"Compared with You (Your Eyes Don't Seem to Age)"	Steve Harley	4:37
2.	"Absolute Beginners"	David Bowie	5:44
3.	"Ae Fond Kiss"	Robert Burns/Traditional	4:24
4.	"Emma"	Errol Brown, Tony Wilson	4:39
5.	"How Can I Tell You"	Cat Stevens	4:19
6.	"I've Just Seen a Face"	Lennon–McCartney	3:01
7.	"Lost Myself"	Crispin Hunt	4:07
8.	"Only You"	Harley	4:19
9.	"Out of Time"	Jagger/Richards	3:47
10.	"Star of Belle Isle"	Traditional	3:21
11.	"When I Paint My Masterpiece"	Bob Dylan	3:48

== Personnel ==
- Steve Harley – vocals, guitar, harmonica
- Martin Simpson – guitars
- Barry Wickens – violin, viola, mandolin, guitar
- Oli Hayhurst – double bass
- Thomas Hooper – drums, percussion
- Genevieve Sylva, Jenny Wallace – backing vocals
- Jim Cregan – guitar solo on "Emma"
- Eddi Reader – guest vocalist on "Star of Belle Isle"
- Thomas Tol – string arrangement
- Emma Breedveld – first violin
- Josje ter Haar – second violin
- Emlyn Stam – viola
- Job ter Haar – cello

Production

- Steve Harley – producer
- Matt Butler – recording engineer, co-producer
- John Prestage – second engineer at Air Studios
- Miles Showell – mastering

Other

- Michel De Pourcq – cover photo
- Mark Scarfe at Aarlsen – sleeve artwork

== Charts ==
Sales chart performance for Uncovered
Chart (2020)	Peak position
Scottish Albums (OCC)	24
UK Album Downloads Chart (OCC)	44
UK Albums Sales Chart (OCC)	27
UK Vinyl Albums Chart (OCC)	33
UK Independent Albums (OCC)	9
