= The Best Years of Our Lives (Steve Harley & Cockney Rebel song) =

1975 song by Steve Harley & Cockney Rebel

Song by Steve Harley & Cockney Rebel

from the album The Best Years of Our Lives
- Released: March 1975
- Genre: Pop-rock
- Length: 5:46
- Label: EMI
- Songwriter: Steve Harley
- Producers: Steve Harley, Alan Parsons

"The Best Years of Our Lives" is a song by the British rock band Steve Harley & Cockney Rebel, released in 1975 as the title track from the band's third studio album The Best Years of Our Lives. In 1977, a live version of the song was released as a single from the album Face to Face: A Live Recording.

== Original studio version ==
=== Background ===
Following the split of the original Cockney Rebel line-up in July 1974, Harley assembled a new line-up later in the year and renamed the band Steve Harley & Cockney Rebel. In November–December 1974, the new band recorded The Best Years of Our Lives album at Abbey Road Studios and Air Studios in London. Speaking to the Sunderland Echo in 1975, Harley said about the recording of the song: "It's probably my favourite recording ever of my own of Cockney Rebel, because we did it completely live in the studio with not one overdub. It feels rich with emotion, it's played with feel and soul, and that's what I wanted." He told The Cockney Rebel Connections Show in 2021, "That was recorded totally live. I was walking around; I had a hand mike on a very long lead. The [band] were all in situ and I was just walking around singing to them. And we kept it that way. Alan [Parsons] said, 'Do you want to [record] this properly?' and I said, 'Nah, it's pretty good like that isn't it?'"

Harley was inspired lyrically by the concept of the 1946 American drama film of the same name. He said in 1975: "The movie [is] about men coming back from war [as] changed men. My story is of a changed man who has in fact entered the best years of his life even though on the surface they appear to be the worst." Speaking to Record & Popswop Mirror in 1974, Harley described "The Best Years of Our Lives" as a "big song" and one which he "sing[s] a lot because it means a lot to me". When the band performed the song live at the Hammersmith Odeon on 14 April 1975, Harley announced it as "the most serious song I've ever wrote in my life". Since then, the song has consistently been a popular inclusion at Harley and the band's concerts, however, the song has undergone multiple arrangement changes over the years (most notably concerning how the song is played during acoustic tours).

In 2014, EMI released a definitive edition of the album as a four CD + DVD box-set. On disc one, a previously unreleased acoustic demo of "The Best Years of Our Lives" was included. In an online diary entry, Harley said of the demo:

""The Best Years Of Our Years" acoustic demo (why do I allow this to reach your ears? WHY?) is proof if needed that all songs start and finish as just that, as a song – not productions, not records. The song comes first. On this original, I attempted to invert the "tragic" and "magic" or was I just tired? That demo was played just to Alan and our tape operator in the early hours when the long day and night had been wrapped. I just told Alan I had something new for tomorrow but didn't fancy going home yet (I would have been alone at Landward Court, Marble Arch, and was slightly Martini-ed up)."

=== Critical reception ===
Upon release, Record & Popswap Mirror reviewed The Best Years of Our Lives and said: "Each song has a distinct character, culminating in the personal message - the title track." In the liner notes of the 2014 definitive edition, Geoff Barton wrote how the song saw Harley "reprising the hard-bitten troubadour persona he adopted on Cockney Rebel's first two albums", adding that it "somehow manages to be both triumphant and mournful at the same time". Donald A. Guarisco of AllMusic retrospectively highlighted the song as one of the album's "standouts". He described it as "a touching acoustic ballad that highlights some of Harley's most direct and emotional lyrics". Guarisco also selected the song as an AMG pick track.

=== Personnel ===
Steve Harley & Cockney Rebel

- Steve Harley – vocals
- Jim Cregan – acoustic guitar
- George Ford – bass guitar
- Duncan Mackay – keyboards
- Stuart Elliott – drums

Production

- Steve Harley – producer
- Alan Parsons – producer, engineer, mixing
- Gary Edwards – tape operator
- Peter James – tape operator
- Chris Blair – mastering

== Face to Face: A Live Recording version ==
"The Best Years of Our Lives"

Single by Steve Harley & Cockney Rebel

from the album Face to Face: A Live Recording
- B-side: "Tumbling Down"
- Released: 12 August 1977
- Genre: Pop-rock
- Length: 5:00
- Label: EMI
- Songwriter: Steve Harley
- Producer: Steve Harley

Steve Harley & Cockney Rebel singles chronology
"(Love) Compared with You" (1977)	"The Best Years of Our Lives" (1977)	"Roll the Dice" (1978)

In 1977, a live version of the song was released as the sole single from the band's live album Face to Face: A Live Recording.

=== Background ===
Following the release of the band's fifth studio album Love's a Prima Donna in October 1976, the band embarked on an eight-date UK tour in December to promote it. A number of concerts were recorded on the tour, along with the band's one-off charity concert at London Rainbow in February 1977. Harley then selected the best tracks for release on a double live album. A day before its release, the band's split was announced. Face to Face: A Live Recording was released in July 1977 and reached at number 40 in the UK charts. To promote the album, a live single was released in August, with "The Best Years of Our Lives" chosen as the A-side, and "Tumbling Down" as the B-side. The single did not enter the UK Top 50.

=== Release ===
The single was released by EMI Records on 7-inch and 12-inch vinyl in the UK only. It was the band's first single to be released on the 12-inch vinyl format, which itself was labelled as being limited edition. The single was also the band's first to be released in the UK with a picture sleeve and featured the same photograph of Harley on stage on both sides of the sleeve. According to Record Mirror, the 12-inch version of the single was limited to 10,000 copies.

=== Critical reception ===
Upon its release, Sheila Prophet of Record Mirror said, "This one is live and it's a cracker. Just listen to the way he controls the audience - amazing. It's easily the best track on Face to Face and though I don't know how valid it is as a single, it's a worthwhile buy for any hard-up fans who can't afford the fancy double album package." John Dilley of the Harborough Mail wrote, "Good number but doubtful if it will ever go anywhere." Ian Birch of Melody Maker stated, "Harley sings the verses over an unadorned acoustic guitar while the audience mostly handle the chorus. Harley's vocals have never been more assured but the song stinks." In a review of the live album, Geoff Barton of Sounds called the song "always an emotional highspot". Tony Parsons of the NME remarked that the "imagery-charged live cut" is "the song the Fag End of Glam Rock troops used to pretend they were being butch over on the terraces". He continued, "Hymn-like dirge turgid in the extreme, strictly for the hard-core who never got round to throwing out the Dan Dare togs."

=== Track listing ===
7-inch single

1. "The Best Years of Our Lives" – 5:00
2. "Tumbling Down" – 6:34

12-inch single

1. "The Best Years of Our Lives" – 5:00
2. "Tumbling Down" – 6:34

== Other live versions ==
Aside from the version appearing on Face to Face: A Live Recording, other live versions of the song have been included on a number of other releases. On 14 April 1975, Steve Harley & Cockney Rebel performed the song as part of their set at the Hammersmith Odeon, London. The concert was filmed and released as a film titled Between the Lines. In 1989, the band's concert at Brighton, which included the song, was released on the VHS The Come Back, All is Forgiven Tour: Live. Live versions also appeared on 1999's Stripped to the Bare Bones and 2004's Anytime! (A Live Set).

Live versions of the song played post-2015 include an improvisation section after the main lyric section of the song has finished, where Harley gives each musician on stage an opportunity to do a solo, following the tune of the three main verses at first, and then moving into improvisation, normally starting with keyboards, and finishing with electric guitar (under Paul Cuddeford), or melodica and violin, with acoustic guitar after keyboards (under Robbie Gladwell). When played this way, the song often lasts for over 15 minutes, almost 5 times the length of the original song. For example, the October 2021 Edinburgh Queen's Hall concert's order was piano, acoustic guitar, bass guitar, violin, melodica. Whereas the June 2019 show at Holmfirth Picturedrome instead featured piano, violin, melodica, and electric guitar. In both instances, melodica and violin would end up being played together, as a duet. Furthermore, when there are guest musicians on stage, Harley will often invite them to also do a solo on the track.

== MonaLisa Twins version ==
In 2015, the MonaLisa Twins recorded their own version of the song. A music video for their version was uploaded onto YouTube on 4 October 2015. The song was recorded to tie-in with the duo's upcoming involvement in the November 2015 UK tour of Steve Harley & Cockney Rebel, which celebrated the 40th anniversary of the album of the same name. On the tour, the MonaLisa Twins were part of the backing band.

For their version of "The Best Years of Our Lives", the MonaLisa Twins revealed:

"Our big tour with Steve Harley & Cockney Rebel is just around the corner. So we decided it's only fitting to cover our favourite song and at the same time title track of the album "The Best Years of Our Lives". We consider the live performance of this song, especially the one on Steve's first live album "Face to Face", one of the most touching live moments in rock history. It clearly shows why he belongs to the exclusive circle of live entertainers who can mesmerise an audience in style without having to play cheap tricks."
