= Make Me Smile (Come Up and See Me) =

1975 single by Steve Harley and Cockney Rebel

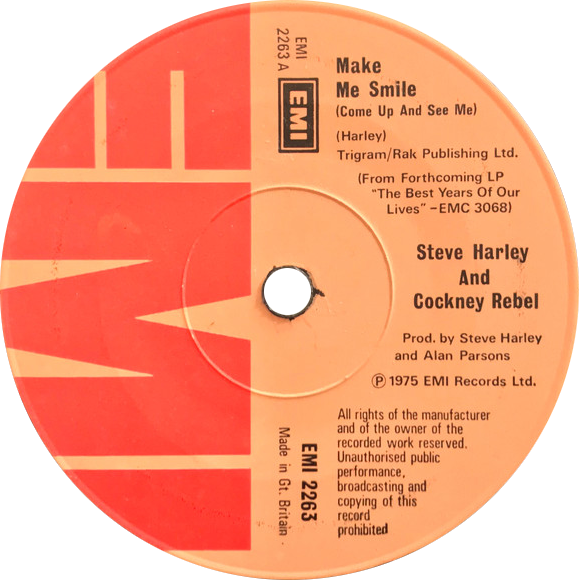
- Solid centre variant of the UK single

Single by Steve Harley and Cockney Rebel

from the album The Best Years of Our Lives
- B-side: "Another Journey"
- Released: 31 January 1975
- Recorded: 1974
- Length: 4:01
- Label: EMI
- Songwriter: Steve Harley
- Producers: Steve Harley; Alan Parsons

Steve Harley and Cockney Rebel singles chronology
"Tumbling Down" (1975)	"Make Me Smile (Come Up and See Me)" (1975)	"Mr. Raffles (Man, It Was Mean)" (1975)

Music video
- "Make Me Smile (Come Up and See Me)" by Steve Harley & Cockney Rebel on YouTube

"Make Me Smile (Come Up and See Me)" is a song by the English rock band Steve Harley & Cockney Rebel, released on 31 January 1975 by EMI as the lead single from the band's third studio album The Best Years of Our Lives. The song was written by Harley, and produced by Harley and Alan Parsons. In February 1975, the song reached number one on the UK chart and spent nine weeks in the Top 50. It has sold over 1.5 million copies worldwide as of 2015 and received a platinum certification from the British Phonographic Industry in November 2024. The song is one of the most-played songs in British broadcasting history.

More than 120 cover versions of the song have been recorded by other artists, most notably by Duran Duran and Erasure, although Harley stated his favourite cover version was by the Wedding Present.

== Writing and composition ==
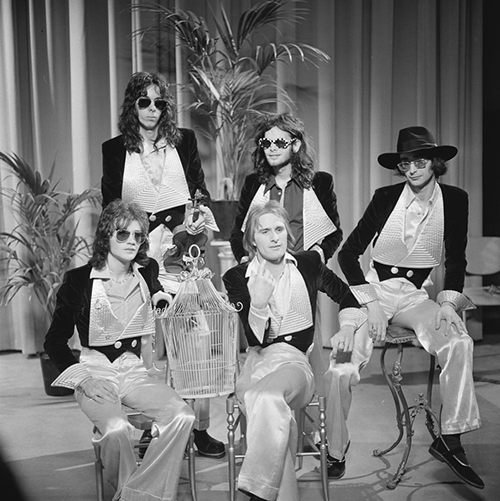
Cockney Rebel, 1974

The song was the first single to be released under the name "Steve Harley and Cockney Rebel", as opposed to simply "Cockney Rebel". In July 1974, the original Cockney Rebel disbanded, and Harley then assembled a new line-up later in the year. "Make Me Smile" described Harley's feelings on the band's split. For many years, it was believed that Harley purposely chose to disband the original line-up and embark on a new career path. Years later, Harley began to reveal the truth behind the band's split.

Between May and July 1974, Cockney Rebel embarked on a major British tour to promote their second studio album The Psychomodo. As the tour progressed, the band began facing growing tensions, which ultimately led to their split at the end of the tour in late July. On 18 July, the band received a 'Gold Award' for outstanding new act of 1974, and a week later they had split up over their disagreements. Jean-Paul Crocker, Milton Reame-James and Paul Jeffreys had approached Harley, insisting they could also write material for the group. Harley, the band's sole songwriter, felt this was unfair as he had been the one to originally hire the musicians for his group, and explained the deal to them at the time.

After the band split, only the original line-up's drummer, Stuart Elliott, would join the new line-up. In a television interview recorded in 2002, Harley described how the lyrics were vindictively directed at the former band members who, he felt, had abandoned him.

On The One Show in October 2010, Harley called the lyric "a finger-pointing piece of vengeful poetry. It's getting off my chest how I felt about the guys splitting up a perfectly workable machine. I wrote it saying 'Look, you'll learn how well we're doing here, we're doing well, why are you doing this?'" He elaborated:

Three of them came to me in a little posse with several ultimatums. They wanted to write songs for the third album, and I said 'Well you know I started the band, and I auditioned you, and I told you the deal at the time. We're not moving the goal posts here.' They knew this, and they came to me demanding that they could write songs too, and I just said 'Well go and do it then'.

Harley began writing the song only days after the band's split. The tune was based on an unused Harley-penned track called "Laid in the Shade", which was the first song Harley ever performed when he began playing in London folk clubs on open-mike nights in 1971 and one which he demoed that same year using his classical guitar at Venus Recording Studios in Whitechapel. He later recalled the song was "absolute rubbish" but felt "the tune worked". Returning to this earlier tune, he wrote new lyrics and came up with a slow blues track with a dark mood, a song vastly different from the one that was recorded. In January 2012, he told Uncut magazine that the first verse was probably written at four in the morning after a bottle of brandy, feeling sorry for himself. On The One Show Harley added, "I was in distress, there's no doubt at all, out of adversity I had to talk about it, I had to write about it. I had to say these things, I had to get it off my chest."

In One Thousand UK Number One Hits by Jon Kutner and Spencer Leigh, Harley recalled the end of Cockney Rebel version 1:

We split up because they wanted to take my leadership away. They wanted to dilute it and "Make Me Smile" is saying 'Come back one day and I'll laugh.' It was arrogant but I knew they were wrong - they didn't understand the group like I did.

== Recording ==
The new line-up of the band recorded The Best Years of Our Lives album in November–December 1974 at Abbey Road Studios in London. On a day in November, Harley arrived at the studio and played the band the original "slow blues" version of the song for them to rehearse. Harley recalled to Uncut in 2012 that it was "a little dirgy, slower and a little pedestrian, very on the beat", while guitarist Jim Cregan recounted in 2022 that the original presentation was "a bit ramshackle" and "not an obvious single".

After producer Alan Parsons heard the song, he suggested speeding the song's tempo up, as he felt it would suit the song better. Harley then developed the song further, introducing tacets, dead stops and gaps into it. Harley recalled in 2014: "Alan was great, he didn't try to dissuade me, he just said, 'Do it'." On The One Show, Harley added: "Suddenly it was swinging, and bopping, and ooh-la-la. We saw a hit record being built here, there was no doubt."

In a 2015 interview for Songwriting Magazine, Parsons recalled:

I think a good producer can transform a song. If you make a small change compositionally that really makes a song gel then you can say production is part of songwriting. For example I remember on Steve Harley's "Make Me Smile (Come Up And See Me)" he was phrasing the chorus completely differently and I suggested that he made it more rhythmic and I think that is part of the hook of the whole record, so I take a bit of credit for that – although I didn't get paid for it.

Keyboardist Duncan Mackay came up with the ascending notes used for the song's introduction. A saxophone solo was originally planned for the song's instrumental break. However, after hearing Harley's idea for the solo, Cregan began to play the idea on the guitar. Harley recalled in 2014:

The guitar solo was over a completely new chord sequence. The middle-eight is totally separate from the rest of the song, with no lyrics, so it's an instrumental break that's a little bit left field. We took ages getting the solo right. Some of the guys who play the guitar for me now have a lot of problems with it. It's a tough solo to play properly. It was a composite of three separate takes.

A number of backing singers contributed to the song, including future chart-topper Tina Charles, as well as Yvonne Keeley, Linda Lewis and Liza Strike.

When the song was near completion, Harley played an early mix of the song to Bob Mercer, who was the head of A&R at EMI. Harley remembered: "We were all drinking Martini, it was late at night, and we were completely knackered. Bob came in and was absolutely blown away. I asked him what he thought and he said simply, 'Number one'".

By the time the song was finished, Harley and the band felt confident the song was a hit single. He recalled: "We certainly smelled something cooking that was very special. We had a huge chorus on there. Once they'd [the backing vocalists] had done their bit I came up with The Beatles bit – 'Ooh-la-la-la' – kind of from their "Rubber Soul" period. I made the song really hooky because the lyrics are quite dark and cynical, frankly."

=== 2000 version ===
In 1999, Harley re-recorded "Make Me Smile", with backing vocals by the London Community Gospel Choir, for the British film Best, which was released in 2000. In a 2000 interview with VH-1, Harley said he was approached by the film's producers, "They wanted a different [version]. They knew my voice had changed and I said I wanted to put a gospel choir on it, so we've done a new one." He added to the Southern Daily Echo: "It's very similar to the original, I'm sad to say. I would have liked very much to have gone for broke and got something new out of it. But they had already filmed the end sequence, which the song ties in with, and they needed something with the same tempo." In 2005, a remix of the 1999 recording, featuring a new lead vocal track, was released as a single to celebrate the song's 30th anniversary. Harley stated, "It's a bit quicker [than the original] and has a real edge to it".

== Release ==
"Make Me Smile (Come Up and See Me)" was released in the UK by EMI Records on 31 January 1975. It was also released in various European countries, Australasia, the US, South Africa and Japan. The single's B-side was the non-album track "Another Journey", which was written by Harley.

"Make Me Smile (Come Up and See Me)" became Steve Harley and Cockney Rebel's biggest selling hit and has sold over 1.5 million copies worldwide as of 2015. It was also the band's only number-one hit in their home country, topping the UK Singles Chart in February 1975. It reached number one on the Irish Singles Chart the same month. In addition to this, it was the band's only Billboard entry in the US, reaching number 96 on the Billboard Hot 100 chart in 1976. Upon hearing the news that the single had reached number one in the UK, the band, who were in Los Angeles at the time, celebrated by jumping fully clothed into their hotel's swimming pool.

=== Reissues ===
"Make Me Smile" has been reissued a number of times in the UK. Its first was through EMI on 3 October 1980 to promote the compilation album The Best of Steve Harley and Cockney Rebel. On 25 November 1983 and again on 28 October 1991, it was reissued on the Old Gold label, with a picture sleeve included with the 1991 release. All three reissues failed to chart.

On 13 April 1992, EMI reissued the single on 7-inch, cassette and CD formats ahead of their Make Me Smile – The Best of Steve Harley and Cockney Rebel compilation. It reached number 46 in the UK charts and remained in the top 75 for two weeks. Old Gold reissued the single on CD format on 30 October 1995, and another EMI reissue followed on cassette and CD on 18 December 1995, to coincide with the song's use in a £1 million Christmas TV advertising campaign for Carlsberg. This release reached number 33 in the UK and spent three weeks in the chart.

On 20 June 2005, a "30th Anniversary Re-mix" of the song, based on the 2000 re-recorded version, was released as a single by Gott Discs. It reached number 55 in the UK and spent two weeks in the charts. Following a request on Top Gear to download the song, "Make Me Smile" re-entered the UK charts at number 72 in early February 2015.

On 12 April 2025, Chrysalis reissued a 50th anniversary edition of "Make Me Smile" on 7-inch for Record Store Day. The limited edition release features previously unseen photographs of Harley, taken by Mick Rock, on the front sleeve, and a previously unreleased instrumental rehearsal of the song as the B-side.

=== Use in film and media ===
The song has been used in the soundtracks of the films Rik Mayall Presents Dancing Queen (1993), The Full Monty (1997), Velvet Goldmine (1998), Best – The George Best Story (2000), Saving Grace (2000), and Blackball (2003). It was also used in a 2006 Marks & Spencer advertisement and during the opening of episode 3 of Phoenix Nights series 1 (2001). The song also featured in adverts for Furniture Village from 2009 until 2012, as well as an advert for Viagra Connect drug for erectile dysfunction, first broadcast in the UK in May 2018.

The song was later included as a playable song in Lego Rock Band (2009) for the seventh generation of games consoles.

== Top Gear ==
In late 2014, Harley received a speeding fine of £1,000, and six points on his licence, after being caught by a speed camera doing 70 miles per hour on the M25 in Kent, in an area where the limit had been temporarily reduced to 40 mph. In January 2015, this incident was discussed on the BBC television series Top Gear. The show's presenters Jeremy Clarkson, Richard Hammond and James May urged viewers to download the song in a bid to help him pay the fine. Clarkson had commented, "He's making a meagre living out of, let's be honest, one hit single. Everybody loves that song – you can't trust someone who doesn't like that song." Hammond added, "Imagine if everybody did it – he would wake up tomorrow and think 'I'm number one, where did that come from?' It would cheer him up."

The campaign, dubbed the "Make Me Smile Foundation" by Clarkson, saw Harley respond with a message via Twitter: "Thanks Jeremy Clarkson for kicking off the Make Me Smile Foundation, more than happy to subsidise the poor sods who drive down Swanley Way!" Additionally, Harley posted a YouTube video where he performed a forty-second version of the song acoustically, with a new set of lyrics relating to the speeding fine.

In late January 2015, the song entered the Top 30 on iTunes, the Top 15 on Amazon.co.uk's Top 100 Bestsellers, and the number one best-seller under the Rock category on the same website. On 27 January, the song entered at number 25 on the official UK mid-week chart, and number 72 on the overall chart for the week.

== Promotion ==
An accompanying music video was shot for the single's original release in 1975, featuring the band performing the song in a TV studio setting. Harley wore a red fox fur leather jacket in the video, which he retained until 2005, when he auctioned it along with other outfits to raise money for polio research.

In the UK, the band performed the song on UK music show Top of the Pops. The performance featured mimed instrumental backing, with Harley performing a live vocal. On the show, Harley was suffering from jet-lag, and subsequently forgot the lyrics to the majority of the second and third verses. The band also performed the song on the Russell Harty Show while it was at number one.

== Critical reception ==
The reaction from the UK music press was mixed. In Melody Maker, Colin Irwin criticised Harley's vocals as "excruciatingly stylised" but called the song a "strongly Dylanish, tuneful thing", and commended Harley for having "concentrated on producing a good song without relying so heavily on his own syle and character to see it through". However, Steve Clarke of NME stated that it was "not a good song" and that it "employed those irritating stop-go instrumental/vocal touches". Sue Byrom of Record & Popswop Mirror felt the song lacked the "punch" and "innovative flash" of the original Cockney Rebel, but predicted it would be a hit. John Peel, writing for Sounds, rated it three out of five stars and predicted it would reach the top 10. He considered it to show a "softer Harley" as he "put[s] his stylised voice to work on an attractive pop song" with the "soft accompaniment [of] acoustic guitar, classical guitar and singing ladies".

Colin Gay of the Bolton Evening News remarked that the song is "commercial and will probably do well in the charts", but added "it's not a patch on their last hit, 'Mr. Soft'". The Irvine Herald felt the song "knocks spots off their old material" and added that the guitar solo is "a delight to listen to". Jim Green of Trouser Press considered it "simple and somewhat catchy", with Harley's "excessively mannered vocal provid[ing] a nice contrast to the chick singers hooting in the background". In the US, Cash Box listed it as one of their "picks of the week" and called it a "hot production featuring fine acoustic lead guitar work, strings, synthesizer (tasteful!) and tight harmonies". Record World noted that "this Ian Hunter sounding tune could be [Harley's] ticket to mak[ing] a substantial impact here [in the US]".

In a review of the 1995 reissue, Alan Jones, writing for Music Week, called the song a "classic contrivance" that is "forged mainly from tongue-in-cheek observation of Dylan mannerisms, though it does have a melodic strength and grace all of its own." The Arbroath Herald awarded it a nine out of ten rating. The reviewer stated, "This is one of the real goodies from 20 years ago. It is exceptionally catchy, and is still every bit good enough for another run in the charts. Harley had a unique, styilised vocal style, like David Bowie gone in a different direction, and is a singer who deserves to be heard again." In a retrospective review of The Best Years of Our Lives, Donald A. Guarisco of AllMusic described it as a "romantic pop tune" that "pairs Harley's clever wordplay with a clever pop tune that boasts an inventive stop-start arrangement and a lovely flamenco-styled acoustic guitar solo".

== Track listing ==
7-inch single

1. "Make Me Smile (Come Up and See Me)" – 3:55
2. "Another Journey" – 2:47

7-inch single (1980 UK reissue)

1. "Make Me Smile (Come Up and See Me)" – 3:55
2. "Sebastian" – 6:46

7-inch single (1983 and 1991 UK reissue)

1. "Make Me Smile (Come Up and See Me)" – 3:58
2. "Judy Teen" – 3:41

7-inch and cassette single (1992 UK reissue)

1. "Make Me Smile (Come Up and See Me)" – 3:59
2. "Mr. Soft" – 3:19

CD single (1992 UK reissue)

1. "Make Me Smile (Come Up and See Me)" – 3:59
2. "Mr. Soft" – 3:19
3. "Spaced Out" – 3:02
4. "(Love) Compared with You" – 4:19

Cassette single (1995 UK reissue)

1. "Make Me Smile (Come Up and See Me)" – 3:59
2. "Mr. Soft" – 3:17

CD single (1995 UK reissue)

1. "Make Me Smile (Come Up and See Me)" – 3:59
2. "Mr. Soft" – 3:17
3. "(I Believe) Love's a Prima Donna" – 4:07
4. "Another Journey" – 2:48

7-inch single (2005 UK 30th Anniversary Re-mix)

1. "Make Me Smile (Come Up and See Me)" – 4:29
2. "Judy Teen" (Live) – 3:16

CD single (2005 UK 30th Anniversary Re-mix)

1. "Make Me Smile (Come Up and See Me)" – 4:29
2. "Judy Teen" (Live) – 3:16
3. "The Quality of Mercy (Taster)" – 1:58

== Personnel ==
Steve Harley and Cockney Rebel:

- Steve Harley – vocals
- Jim Cregan – guitar, backing vocals
- Duncan Mackay – keyboards
- George Ford – bass guitar, backing vocals
- Stuart Elliott – drums

Additional personnel

- Tina Charles, Martin Jay, Yvonne Keeley, Linda Lewis, Liza Strike – backing vocals
- Steve Harley, Alan Parsons – producers
- Alan Parsons – mixing, engineer
- Gary Edwards, Peter James – tape operators
- Chris Blair – mastering

== Charts ==
=== Weekly charts ===
Chart (1975)	Peak position
Australia (Kent Music Report)	17
Belgium (Ultratop 50 Flanders)	7
Belgium (Ultratop 50 Wallonia)	20
Netherlands (Dutch Top 40)	6
Netherlands (Single Top 100)	5
Ireland (IRMA)	1
South Africa	15
UK Singles (Official Charts)	1
West Germany (GfK)	20

Chart (1976)	Peak position
US Billboard Hot 100	96

Chart (1992)	Peak position
UK Singles (Official Charts)	46

Chart (1995)	Peak position
UK Singles (Official Charts)	33

Chart (2005)	Peak position
UK Singles (Official Charts)	55
UK Indie (Official Charts)	7

Chart (2015)	Peak position
UK Singles (Official Charts)	72

Chart (2024)	Peak position
UK Singles Downloads (Official Charts)	13
UK Singles Sales (OCC)	16

Chart (2025)	Peak position
UK Singles Sales (OCC)	38
UK Vinyl Singles Chart (OCC)	17

=== Year-end charts ===
Chart (1975)	Position
Australia (Kent Music Report)	92
Belgium (Ultratop Flanders)	77
Netherlands (Dutch Top 40)	63
Netherlands (Single Top 100)	42

== Certifications ==
Region	Certification	Certified units/sales
United Kingdom (BPI)	Platinum	600,000^{‡}
^{‡} Sales+streaming figures based on certification alone.

== Duran Duran version ==
"Come Up and See Me (Make Me Smile)"
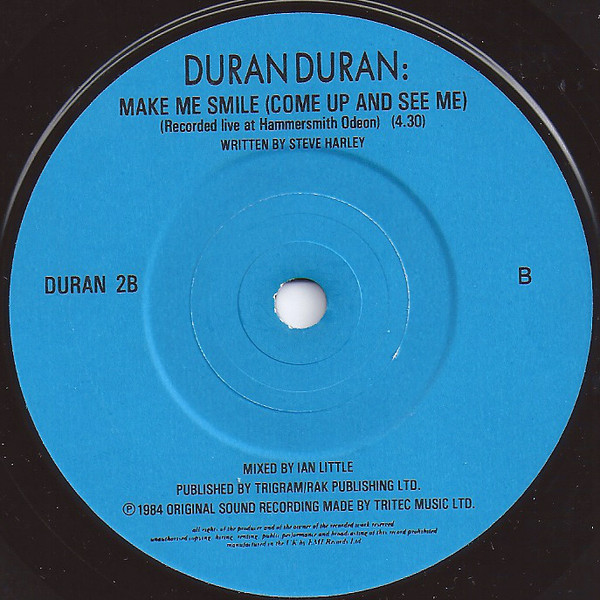
- B-side label of "The Reflex" UK vinyl release

Single by Duran Duran
- A-side: "The Reflex"
- Released: 16 April 1984
- Recorded: 16 November 1982
- Venue: Hammersmith Odeon, London
- Genre: Rock
- Length: 4:54
- Label: EMI
- Songwriter: Steve Harley

Performance video
- "Make Me Smile (Come Up and See Me)" by Duran Duran (1982, London) on YouTube

A live cover version of "Make Me Smile" was released as the B-side to Duran Duran's 1984 number one single "The Reflex". On the label and sleeve, the song's original title was reversed and listed as "Come Up and See Me (Make Me Smile)". The band frequently covered the song during their early concerts, and this recording was made during a 16 November 1982 live performance for the BBC College Concert series. The entire concert was released on the live CD/DVD Live at Hammersmith '82! in September 2009. Harley made a guest appearance at one of the band's other two dates at the Hammersmith Odeon in November 1982 to perform the song with them.

After dropping the song from their set list for over twenty years, the reunited Duran Duran brought the song back as a surprise encore at their 28 May 2005 homecoming gig at the Birmingham Football Ground to an audience of 25,000 fans. Harley was invited to perform with them, but was unable to attend.

The Duran Duran version of the song appeared on the soundtrack to the movie Threesome (1994), and as a bonus track on the double CD single for "Perfect Day", from their 1995 covers album Thank You.

Track Listing

- 7-inch single (UK: EMI / DURAN2)

Side one
No.	Title	Writer(s)	Length
1.	"The Reflex"	Duran Duran	4:20

Side two
No.	Title	Writer(s)	Length
1.	"Come Up and See Me (Make Me Smile)" (live)	Steve Harley	4:54

== The Wedding Present version ==
"Make Me Smile (Come Up and See Me)"

Single by The Wedding Present

from the album 3 Songs EP
- Released: 28 September 1990
- Recorded: 1990
- Genre: Post-punk
- Length: 3:40
- Label: RCA
- Songwriter: Steve Harley
- Producer: Steve Albini

A version by the Wedding Present peaked at number 25 on the UK Singles Chart in 1990, as a track on the 3 Songs EP. Steve Harley was very positive about this version, saying, "There are 120 cover versions of 'Make Me Smile', but only the Wedding Present have done it differently. They did a punk version and made it kick. They understood the venom in the lyrics." The cover is also included on the 2001 version of the album Seamonsters and the compilation The Pop Years – 1990–1991.

=== Track listing ===
7-inch EP

1. "Corduroy"
2. "Crawl"
3. "Make Me Smile (Come Up and See Me)"

== Erasure version ==
"Make Me Smile (Come Up and See Me)"

Single by Erasure

from the album Other People's Songs
- B-side: "Oh L'amour"; "Walking in the Rain"; "When Will I See You Again"; "Can't Help Falling in Love"
- Released: 7 April 2003
- Length: 3:58
- Label: Mute
- Songwriter: Steve Harley
- Producers: Gareth Jones; Erasure

Erasure singles chronology
"Solsbury Hill" (2003)	"Make Me Smile (Come Up and See Me)" (2003)	"Oh L'amour" (August Mix) (2003)

Music video
- Erasure – "Make Me Smile (Come Up and See Me)" on YouTube

The English synth-pop duo Erasure included "Make Me Smile (Come Up and See Me)" on their cover versions album Other People's Songs. After the UK top-ten success of their previous single "Solsbury Hill", Erasure again charted well when "Make Me Smile" reached number 14 on the UK Singles Chart. It also reached number 19 in Denmark and number 58 in Germany.

Harley approved of Erasure's version, calling it "rather exciting". He told The Mouth Magazine in 2019, "Their version was disco, it was in 4/4 time. It was very odd to me, when I first heard it, 'cos [it] didn't have all the gaps in 6/8 that I'd put in, and all that. So I was fascinated by how that worked, and what Erasure did... I do love the way people put their own slant on the song, I really do."

Erasure's version appeared in the first episode of season one of the television show My Name Is Earl in 2005. A live performance recorded in Copenhagen on 9 June 2003 is included on the DVD The Erasure Show – Live in Cologne.

=== Music video ===
The music video has Erasure members Vince Clarke and Andy Bell in the midst of computer-generated special effects and graphics. The statue in the video also appears in their 2005 video for "Breathe".

=== Track listings ===
CD single

- UK: Mute / CDMUTE292

No.	Title	Writer(s)	Length
1.	"Make Me Smile (Come Up and See Me)" (Dave Bascombe Edit Mix)	Steve Harley	3:27
2.	"Oh L'amour" (Acoustic, recorded live at the Sirius National Broadcast Studios in New York on 14 January 2003)	Vince Clarke, Andy Bell	3:28
3.	"Walking in the Rain" (37b Remix)	Barry Mann, Cynthia Weil, Phil Spector	2:48

- UK: Mute / LCDMUTE292

No.	Title	Writer(s)	Length
1.	"Make Me Smile (Come Up and See Me)" (Dan Frampton Radio Mix)	Harley	3:32
2.	"Make Me Smile (Come Up and See Me)" (Manhattan Clique Extended Remix)	Harley	7:30
3.	"When Will I See You Again" (37b Remix)	Gamble and Huff	2:26

DVD single

- UK: Mute / DVDMUTE292

Audio tracks
No.	Title	Writer(s)	Length
1.	"Make Me Smile (Come Up and See Me)" (Album version)	Harley	3:56
2.	"Can't Help Falling in Love" (Acoustic, recorded live at the Sirius National Broadcast Studios in New York on 14 January 2003)	George David Weiss, Hugo Peretti, Luigi Creatore	3:12

Video tracks
No.	Title	Writer(s)	Length
3.	"Solsbury Hill" (Music video, directed by Vince Clarke)	Peter Gabriel	4:20

=== Charts ===
Chart (2003)	Peak position
Denmark (Tracklisten)	14
Germany (GfK)	58
Romania (Romanian Top 100)	98
Scottish Singles Sales (Official Charts)	15
UK Singles (Official Charts)	14
UK Indie (Official Charts)	1

== Other versions ==
Australian group Nick Barker & the Reptiles' version reached the top 30 on the ARIA Singles Chart in November 1989.

== Bibliography ==
- Barton, Geoff (2014). The Best Years of Our Lives – Definitive Edition (booklet). Steve Harley & Cockney Rebel. London, England: Parlophone Records. EMCDX 3068.
