= Videogame Nation =

Videogame Nation may refer to:

- Videogame Nation (TV programme)
- Videogame Nation (exhibition)
