= Emile Ford =

Saint Lucian musician and singer (1937–2016)

Background information
- Also known as: Emile Sweetnam
- Born: Michael Emile Telford Miller; 16 October 1937; Castries, Saint Lucia, British Windward Islands
- Died: 11 April 2016 (aged 78) London, England
- Genres: Rock and roll; pop
- Occupations: Singer; guitarist; sound engineer
- Instruments: Vocals; guitar; keyboards; drums
- Years active: 1957–late 1960s
- Label: Pye
- Website: www.soundrevelation.co.uk

Michael Emile Telford Miller (16 October 1937 – 11 April 2016), known professionally as Emile Ford, was a musician and singer born in Saint Lucia, British Windward Islands. He was popular in the United Kingdom in the late 1950s and early 1960s as the leader of Emile Ford & the Checkmates, who had a number one hit in late 1959 with "What Do You Want to Make Those Eyes at Me For?", which was the Christmas number one that year. He was also a pioneering sound engineer.

== Life and career ==
Emile Ford was born in Castries, Saint Lucia, in the West Indies. He was the son of Barbadian politician, Frederick Edward Miller, and Madge Murray, a singer and musical theatre director whose father had founded and conducted the St. Lucia Philharmonic Band. His mother married again, taking the name of Sweetnam; some sources erroneously give Emile Ford's birth name as Sweetnam or Sweetman.

He was educated at St Mary’s College, Castries. He moved to London with his mother and family in the mid-1950s, partly motivated by his desire to explore improved sound reproduction technology, and studied at the Paddington Technical College in London. It was during this time that he taught himself to play a number of musical instruments, including guitar, piano, violin, bass guitar and drums. Using an abbreviated form of his name, as Emile Ford, he first entered show business at the age of 20, and made his first public performance at The Buttery, Kensington. His first appearance with a backing group was at the Athenaeum Ballroom in Muswell Hill. His TV appearances in 1958 included outings on The Music Shop, the Pearl Carr & Teddy Johnson Show, Oh Boy! and Six-Five Special.

He teamed up in January 1959 with his half-brother, bassist George Sweetnam-Ford (born 1 January 1940, Castries, St. Lucia, British West Indies), electric lead guitarist Ken Street (27 June 1942 – 2 June 1990), sax player Dave Sweetnam-Ford (b. David Sweetnam-Ford, 1939, Castries, St. Lucia, British West Indies) and drummer John Cuffley (born 1939) to form Emile Ford & the Checkmates. The band appeared on the TV programme Sunday Serenade, which ran for six weeks. They won the Soho Fair talent contest in July 1959, but turned down a recording contract with EMI because the company would not allow Ford to produce their records, and instead agreed to a deal with Pye Records. Their first self-produced recording, "What Do You Want to Make Those Eyes at Me For?", a song originally recorded by Ada Jones and Billy Murray in 1917, went to number one in the UK Singles Chart at the end of 1959 and stayed there for six weeks. Ford was the first Black British artist to sell one million copies of a single.

In January 1960, Ford signed a two-year employment management contract with Leslie Grade. He had several more hits in the UK, and also scored a number one EP in 1960. The readers of the British music magazine New Musical Express voted Emile Ford & the Checkmates as the "Best New Act" in 1960. Ford's debut album was made up of covers. He made several albums, but his last studio recordings were in 1963. His half-brothers George and Dave Sweetnam-Ford were later members of the Ferris Wheel.

Counting Teardrops, an anthology including all of Ford's recordings with Pye Records, was released in 2001.

=== Interpretation of sound ===
Ford, like Jimi Hendrix, had synaesthesia, a condition where the person who can associate certain colours, or even see certain colours in relation to the sound they are hearing. An article about Emile Ford appears in the November 2004 issue of the UK Synaesthesia Association Newsletter. He once said that he was gifted with the ability to see and hear sound differently from others and that gift allowed him to make first-class recordings.

== Backing ==
The female singers that backed him were originally called The Fordettes. They consisted of Eda Hansen, Margot Quantrell, Eleanor Russell, Vicki Haseman and Betty Prescott. They spent a year on the road with Ford in 1960, playing one-nighters. Back in London they left Ford to sing backup for Joe Brown who Vicki Haseman was engaged to. They were then known as The Breakaways.

== Audio engineering ==
As a sound engineer, Ford was responsible for creating a backing track system for stage shows, first used in 1960, which provided a basis for what became known as karaoke. In 1969, he set up a recording studio in Barbados with the help of his father, before moving to Sweden. While there, he further developed a new open-air playback system for stage shows, patented as the Liveoteque Sound Frequency Feedback Injection System.

== Death ==
Emile Ford died in London on 11 April 2016, aged 78.

== Discography ==
Singles(α – Credited to Emile Ford. All other recordings credit Emile Ford & the Checkmates)
| Title | Release info | Year | UK | AU | NL | NO |
|---|---|---|---|---|---|---|
| "Don't Tell Me Your Troubles"/"What Do You Want to Make Those Eyes at Me For?" | Pye 7N15225 | 1959 | 1 | 1 | 3 | 1 |
| "On a Slow Boat to China"/"That Lucky Old Sun" | Pye 7N15245 | 1960 | 3 | - | - | - |
| "You'll Never Know What You're Missing ('Til You Try)"/"Still" | Pye 7N15268 | 1960 | 12 | - | - | - |
| *"Them There Eyes"/"Question" | Pye 7N15282 | 1960 | 18 | - | - | - |
| "Counting Teardrops"/"White Christmas" | Pye 7N15314 | 1960 | 4 | - | - | - |
| "What Am I Gonna Do"/"A Kiss To Build A Dream On" | Pye 7N15331 | 1961 | 33 | - | - | - |
| "Half Of My Heart"/"Gypsy Love" | Piccadilly 7N35003 | 1961 | 42 | - | - | - |
| "I Wonder Who's Kissing Her Now"/"Doin'The Twist" | Piccadilly 7N35003 | 1962 | 43 | - | - | - |

Emile Ford & the Checkmates albumsUK releases unless specified otherwise
| Title | Release info | Year | F | Notes |
|---|---|---|---|---|
| New Tracks With Emile | Pye Records NPL 18049 | 1960 | LP | |
| Emile | Piccadilly NPL.38001 | 1961 | LP | |
| Meet Emile At Gröna Lund Again | Pye Golden Guinea Records GGL 9002 | 1970 | LP | Sweden release Reissue |
| The Very Best of Emile Ford & the Checkmates | See For Miles Records Ltd. SEE 309 | 1991 | LP | Compilation |
| Greatest Hits | Savanna SSLCD 201 | 1992 | CD | Compilation |
| Counting Teardrops | Sequel Records NEECD 347 | 2000 | 2 CD | Compilation |
| What Do You Want To Make Those Eyes At Me For? | Castle Pulse PLSCD 798 | 2006 | CD | Compilation |
| The Very Best Of Emile Ford & The Checkmates | One Day Music DAY2CD303 | 2016 | 2 CD | Europe release, compilation |

Emile Ford solo albumsUK releases unless specified otherwise
| Title | Release info | Year | F | Notes |
|---|---|---|---|---|
| Emile Under The Midnight Sun | Pye Golden Guinea Records GGL 9001 | 1970 | LP | Sweden release Reissue |
| Big Hits | Grand Prix GP-9973; Sonet GP-9973 | 1970 | LP | Sweden release |
| Emile Ford | Hallmark Records SHM764 | 1971 | LP | |
| The Man Who's Got The Lot | Met-El-Ford Records METLPS1 | 1973 | LP | |
| What Do You Want To Make Those Eyes At Me For? | Philips 6641 343 | 1975 | 2 LP | Sweden release |
| On a Slow Boat to China | Alpha Records ALPHA LPS 1 | 1976 | LP | Produced by Emile Ford and Valerie Stack |
| My Kind Of Country Music | Transdisc Records TRLPS 007 | 1976 | LP | Netherlands release |
| The Emile Ford Show Recorded Live In A Swedish Folkpark | Interdisc ILPS 117 | | LP | Sweden release Also on Swedisc SWELP 35 |
| The Midnight Hour | Interdisc ILPS 157 | | LP | Sweden release Also on Swedisc SWLS 506 |
| More Emile Ford | Interdisc ILPS 158 | | LP | Scandinavia release |
| The Eyes Of Mr. "What Do You Want To Make Those Eyes At Me For?, The Man Who's Got The Lot | Interclub Records Ltd ICLPS 001 | | 2LP | |
| Emile Ford Sings 14 Songs In This Love Letter | Transdisc Records – TRLPS 002; Interclub Records Ltd – ICLPS 002 | | LP | |

== See also ==
- List of artists who reached number one on the UK Singles Chart
- List of number-one singles from the 1950s (UK)
- UK No.1 Hits of 1959
- UK No.1 Hits of 1960
- List of Christmas number one singles (UK)
- List of number-one singles in Australia during the 1960s
- List of artists who reached number one on the Australian singles chart
