= Big Big Deal =

1974 song by Steve Harley

Single by Steve Harley
- B-side: "Bed in the Corner"
- Released: 1 November 1974
- Genre: Pop, rock
- Length: 5:36 (full version); 4:34 (single version)
- Label: EMI
- Songwriter: Steve Harley
- Producer: Steve Harley

Steve Harley singles chronology
"Mr. Soft" (1974)	"Big Big Deal" (1974)	"Tumbling Down" (1975)

Alternative Cover
- Belgian cover of "Big Big Deal"

"Big Big Deal" is a song by British singer-songwriter Steve Harley, released by EMI as his debut solo single on 1 November 1974. The song, which was written and produced by Harley, would be his only solo release before the formation of the second line-up of Steve Harley & Cockney Rebel.

== Background ==
"Big Big Deal" was recorded during the time when Harley was in the process of forming a new line-up for Cockney Rebel. The original band split at the end of an extensive UK tour in July 1974 but, despite the setback, the band's label, EMI Records, were not dissuaded, as Harley revealed in 2014, "The people at my record label were right behind me. They believed I could find new band members without too much of a problem and continue on to a new level of success. They believed it wasn't a major stumbling block." While auditioning musicians and finalising a new line-up, Harley recorded "Big Big Deal" at Air Studios, London in September 1974. He played all instruments on the track except drums, which were played by Cockney Rebel drummer Stuart Elliott.

Harley initially only intended to record the song as a demo, but was ultimately satisfied enough to take it to EMI and express his wishes to have it released as a single. He told Disc in 1974, "It was an experiment and started out being intended as a demo, but in the end it became more than that, so I decided to put it out as a 'one off' single under my own name." Harley demanded "Big Big Deal" be released without the Cockney Rebel name as he did not want to mislead the public. He told Record & Popswop Mirror, "I don't want anyone thinking it's my new group playing on it because it isn't." The single was released on 1 November 1974. It failed to enter the UK Singles Chart, but did appear on the unnumbered UK Breakers Chart on 23 November 1974.

Speaking to Record & Popswop Mirror in 1974, Harley said of the song, "It's on the lines of 'Judy Teen' and 'Mr. Soft'. Could almost be the old group [Cockney Rebel], couldn't it? First time I played it back I thought, 'Hey it could be the old group' and I realised a few home truths."

== Release ==
"Big Big Deal" was released by EMI Records on 7-inch vinyl in the UK, Ireland, Belgium and Germany. The B-side, "Bed in the Corner", was taken from Cockney Rebel's 1974 album The Psychomodo, and was written by Harley, and produced by Harley and Alan Parsons.

Following its original release as a single, "Big Big Deal" first appeared on the 1980 EMI compilation The Best of Steve Harley and Cockney Rebel. In 1992, it appeared as a bonus track on the EMI CD re-issue of The Psychomodo. It has also appeared on 2006's The Cockney Rebel – A Steve Harley Anthology, and on 2012's Cavaliers: An Anthology 1973-1974. In addition to the single version, the Cavaliers release included the full version of "Big Big Deal", which was previously unreleased.

== Promotion ==
On 24 October 1974, Harley performed the song, along with "Bed in the Corner", live on David Jensen's ITV show 45. The single was also promoted by an advert in the 9 November 1974 issue of Melody Maker. During October 1974, the new Cockney Rebel line-up included the song within their set-list for the three concerts they performed that month.

== Critical reception ==
Upon its release, Sue Byrom of Record & Popswop Mirror felt that "Big Big Deal" was not "as good" as Harley's previous material with Cockney Rebel and lacked "the force normally associated with Harley". However, she praised the song's latter section "when Harley goes into a semi la la la hook line". Andy Bone of the Sunday Sun picked the song as one of his "blockbusters" during November 1974. Look-in commented, "The latest single is written, produced and performed by Steve, and the new group's not on it. It's a sign of his individuality and talent, and he's worked hard to get where he is." Stephen Thomas Erlewine of AllMusic highlighted "Big Big Deal" as a standout track on the 2012 compilation Cavaliers: An Anthology 1973-1974 by labelling it an AMG Pick Track.

== Cover versions ==
In April 2016, a version of the song was released by Darren Hayman and the Papernut Cambridge. It was released as a double A-side 7-inch single, along with a cover of the Paul Jones' 1967 song "I've Been a Bad, Bad Boy". The release reached number 38 in the UK Physical Singles Chart and number 29 in the Vinyl Singles Chart.

== Track listing ==
7-inch single

1. "Big Big Deal" – 4:34
2. "Bed in the Corner" – 3:33

== Personnel ==
- Steve Harley – vocals
- Stuart Elliott – drums

Production

- Steve Harley – producer on "Big Big Deal" and "Bed in the Corner"
- Pete Swettenham – engineer on "Big Big Deal"
- Alan Parsons – producer on "Bed in the Corner"
