= (Love) Compared with You =

1976 song by Steve Harley & Cockney Rebel

Single by Steve Harley & Cockney Rebel

from the album Love's a Prima Donna
- B-side: "Too Much Tenderness"
- Released: 1977
- Genre: Pop, rock
- Length: 3:33
- Label: EMI Records
- Songwriter: Steve Harley
- Producer: Steve Harley

Steve Harley & Cockney Rebel singles chronology
"(I Believe) Love's a Prima Donna" (1976)	"(Love) Compared with You" (1977)	"The Best Years of Our Lives (live)" (1977)

"(Love) Compared with You" is a song by the British rock band Steve Harley & Cockney Rebel, released in 1977 as the third and final single from the band's fifth studio album, Love's a Prima Donna (1976). Released as a single in North America only, the song was written and produced by Harley.

== Background ==
Following the UK Top 50 entry of Love's a Prima Donna's second single, "(I Believe) Love's a Prima Donna", plans were made for "(Love) Compared with You" to be released as the third single in the UK. However, EMI Records decided to cancel the release at the last minute. Although the UK release was scrapped, EMI chose to release the song as the album's only single in North America in 1977.

Along with the rest of Love's a Prima Donna, the song was recorded at Abbey Road Studios, sometime between June and September 1976. English violinist Wilfred Gibson, who contributed to choir and orchestral arrangements on the album, scored the string section for the track. Harley stated in 2020 that bassist George Ford's playing on the song was both "exemplary" and "exceptional", and that "any teacher would want to offer that part as a lesson to a student". Speaking to Melody Maker's Harvey Kubernik in February 1977, Harley spoke of the song, revealing: "'(Love) Compared with You' is the first out-and-out love song I've written. I'd been trying for three years."

=== 2020 re-recording ===
In 2020, Harley released a new recording of the song as the opening track on his sixth solo studio album Uncovered. This version, re-titled "Compared with You (Your Eyes Don't Seem to Age)", features a newly-written third verse, replacing the original's repeat of the first verse. Harley revealed to BBC Radio 2's Johnnie Walker in 2020, "I've sung the song [live] many hundreds of times since 1976 [and] every time I'm thinking 'Why are you repeating [the first] verse? Why didn't you write a third verse? Were you lazy? Were you out of words?' 45 years later and I thought the song deserved an update."

Harley's engineer and co-producer Matt Butler suggested Harley write a third verse and re-record the song for Uncovered. Harley wrote the new verse one morning in June during his 10-day residency at Rockfield Studios, where Uncovered was being recorded. Speaking of the inspiration behind the verse, Harley told the Cat Tales podcast in 2022,

"My dad was being cremated in Bury St Edmunds that morning. He wanted a private ceremony with nobody there. It was 8.30 in the morning and I sat outside the studio in the Welsh cornfields and thought about my dad. 20 minutes later I walked back in, the guys were cooking breakfast, and I said to Matt, 'I've got that verse now'. And I don't know now whether I was writing about my dad or my wife. Or, as my dad [had] passed away, I was thinking about [my] ancient, early relationships. I was thinking about my childhood, my young manhood, and I was thinking about some other girlfriends and relationships. So you never know what's inspiring the words but the narrator [in the song] is clearly in a romantic and reflective mood. He says 'I know we've reached a stage', but he doesn't say what stage you're at. I like to leave things to the imagination."

== Release ==
"(Love) Compared with You" was released by EMI Records on 7" vinyl in the US and Canada only. The B-side, "Too Much Tenderness", was written and produced by Harley, and also taken from Love's a Prima Donna. For its release as a single, "(Love) Compared with You" was cut down by almost a minute. A promotional edition of the single was also released, which placed the A-side on both sides of the vinyl; one in stereo and one in mono. Neither release featured a picture sleeve, but used a generic one instead.

Following its original release on the Love's a Prima Donna album, and as a single, the song has also appeared on a number of Steve Harley & Cockney Rebel compilations including 1987's Greatest Hits, 1998's More Than Somewhat – The Very Best of Steve Harley, 1999's The Cream of Steve Harley & Cockney Rebel, and 2006's The Cockney Rebel – A Steve Harley Anthology.

== Critical reception ==
In a review of Love's a Prima Donna, Geoff Barton of Sounds described "(Love) Compared with You" as "balladic" and highlighted the "lovely line "Like a waterfall you tingle me with your love". He added: "This one comes across extremely well, building into an all-encompassing entity and ending with the tear-jerking lines 'I love you - I'm in love with you' echoing away into the distance." Paul Phillips of National RockStar magazine picked the song as one of "two tracks which work, not because they are simple songs, but because they are simply presented". American magazine Billboard picked the song and the title track as the album's best cuts. In a 1976 issue of the EMI Records Weekly News magazine Music Talk, Rex Anderson compared the song with the title track: "'(Love) Compared with You' is the first real highpoint of the album and possibly one of the best things Steve has written to date. It contrasts with all his other work in that it is romantic and dreamy. It is a love hymn with beautifully gentle acoustic guitar, piano, and strings." Later in the review, Anderson also praised Tony Rivers for his vocal arrangements on the song and title track.

In a retrospective review, Donald A. Guarisco of AllMusic commented that it was one of "Harley's finest songs" and described it as a "delicately orchestrated love ballad that manages to be touching and heartfelt without lapsing into sappy sentimentality". Guarisco spoke of the song again in a review of the 1987 Greatest Hits compilation, noting it was a "delicate, subtly orchestrated tune where Harley drops his yen for surrealistic lyrics to communicate in direct and elegantly romantic terms".

== Live performances ==
The song has been performed live during Harley and the band's concerts over the years. As a result, live versions of the song have been recorded and released. A version appeared on the band's 1977 live album Face to Face: A Live Recording, while an acoustic version later appeared on Harley's 1999 album Stripped to the Bare Bones.

In 2010, Harley supported the Children in Need charity by auctioning a personal mini-concert at the winning bidder's home, as well as a signed guitar and a lavish dinner. A German fan won the auction with the bid of $15,000. In December that year, it was revealed that Harley was set to travel to the fan's home to play their requested song, which was "(Love) Compared with You".

== Track listing ==
7-inch single (US)

1. "(Love) Compared with You" (Stereo) – 3:33
2. "Too Much Tenderness" – 4:16

7-inch promotional single (US and Canada)

1. "(Love) Compared with You" (Mono) – 3:33
2. "(Love) Compared with You" (Stereo) – 3:33

== Personnel ==
Steve Harley & Cockney Rebel

- Steve Harley – vocals, guitar
- Jim Cregan – guitar, backing vocals
- Duncan Mackay – keyboards
- George Ford – bass, backing vocals
- Stuart Elliott – drums
- Lindsay Elliott – percussion

Additional musicians

- Tony Rivers – backing vocals, backing vocal arrangement
- John G. Perry – backing vocals
- Stuart Calver – backing vocals
- Wilfred Gibson – string section score

Production

- Steve Harley – producer
- Tony Clark – sound engineer
- Pat Stapley – assistant sound engineer
- Ken Perry – mastering
