= The Ferris Wheel (band) =

(The) Ferris Wheel
- Origin: London, England
- Genres: Rock, soul, psychedelic pop
- Years active: 1966–1970
- Labels: Pye, Polydor
- Past members: Diane Ferraz; Mike Liston (aka Michael Snow); George Sweetnam (aka George Ford); Dave Sweetnam; Mike Anthony; Keith Field; Barry Reeves; Dennis Elliott; Marsha Hunt; Linda Lewis; Terry Edmunds; Bernie Holland; Jim Cregan

The Ferris Wheel were a British rock and soul band, who have been described as "one of England's great lost musical treasures of the mid- to late '60s" and as "one of the most popular club acts" of the time. They released two albums, Can't Break the Habit (1967) and Ferris Wheel (1970), the latter featuring singer Linda Lewis.

== Career ==
The group formed in late 1966. Original singer Diane Ferraz, born in Trinidad, had previously performed in a duo with singer Nicky Scott. They had been paired together and promoted by manager and record producer Simon Napier-Bell, who gained substantial publicity for the duo through his contacts in the London music business and because a pairing of white male and black female singers was unusual at the time. Ferraz and Scott released three singles on the Columbia label in 1966, and toured with a backing band, Simon's Triangle. The group included keyboard player Mike Liston, also known as Michael Snow, who had previously been a member of the group West Five and backed the She Trinity. Ferraz and Scott had little commercial success together, although Napier-Bell's promotional skills on their behalf allowed him to move on to become manager of the Yardbirds. After Scott left, the group were briefly billed as Diane Ferraz and Simon's Triangle.

Ferraz and Liston then formed the Ferris Wheel with Dave Sweetnam (saxophone), George Sweetnam (bass, vocals), and Barry Reeves (drums), who had been members of singer Emile Ford's backing group, the Checkmates. The Sweetnam brothers (the name is sometimes incorrectly spelled Sweetman, and the brothers also used the surname Ford) were half-brothers of Emile Ford. The line-up of the Ferris Wheel - who took their name from that of Ferraz - was completed by guitarist Mike Anthony, later replaced by Keith Field. Vocals in the group were shared between Ferraz, Liston, and George Sweetnam.

The Ferris Wheel quickly became a popular club act in London, and toured more widely. They were signed to Pye Records by producer John Schroeder, who recorded an LP with them, Can't Break the Habit, in 1967. The record drew on both psychedelic pop and soul influences, with some of their songs and arrangements being likened to those of the Fifth Dimension while others were described as a Motown-influenced "gently trippy, soaring, and occasionally searing brand of soul music". Three singles were released from the LP: "I Can't Break the Habit" (1967), "Let It Be Me" and "The Na Na Song" (both 1968), but none reached the UK Singles Chart.

The group continued to tour before Ferraz decided to leave the music business to raise a family. It was reported by Disc and Music Echo in the magazine's June 8, 1968 issue that a Californian female singer called Farina who made her debut with the group the previous week was the replacement. Marsha Hunt came in briefly, before she in turn left to be replaced by Linda Lewis. Among other personnel changes, Reeves was replaced by drummer Dennis Elliott, and in 1969 Field left, to be replaced by guitarist Terry Edmunds, who was in turn replaced towards the end of the group's career, first by Bernie Holland and finally Jim Cregan. Featuring Lewis as lead singer, the group signed a recording contract with the Polydor label, who issued a single, "Can't Stop Now" produced by Ian Samwell, at the start of 1970, followed by an album, Ferris Wheel. The album was released on the Uni label in the US, but was not successful. The group separated in 1970.

== Later activities ==
Although Ferraz took no further part in the music business, several other band members continued their musical careers.

Michael Snow (a.k.a. Liston) wrote Georgie Fame and Alan Price's UK hit single "Rosetta", and performed with Colin Blunstone and Doris Troy among others, before moving to Nashville in 1973 to work as a songwriter and producer. He recorded with Dennis Locorriere and released three Irish-influenced albums, Here Comes the Skelly (1998), The Rats and the Rosary (2001) and Never Say No to a Jar (2003).

Bass player George Ford (a.k.a. Sweetnam, Sweetman, or Sweetnam-Ford) became a session musician, and worked with Welsh singer-songwriter Meic Stevens, Doris Troy, Medicine Head, Peter Skellern, and Steve Harley & Cockney Rebel among others in the 1970s. He featured on Al Stewart's album Year of the Cat and played with Cliff Richard and the Shadows, before moving to Canada in the 1980s. There, he worked with Long John Baldry among others. According to Snow, Ford died in Canada in 2007.

Barry Reeves became a member of Blossom Toes before moving to Germany, where he worked as a percussionist and songwriter with the James Last Orchestra. He married singer Madeline Bell in 1988, and died of pneumonia in 2010.

Linda Lewis and Jim Cregan later married, and subsequently divorced. Lewis worked as a solo artist from 1970, recording almost 20 albums and having several UK hit singles including "Rock-A-Doodle-Doo" (1973) and "It's in His Kiss" (1975). Cregan worked with Family, Steve Harley & Cockney Rebel and Rod Stewart, among many others. Marsha Hunt appeared in the musical Hair in London, and worked as a model, actress, and as a solo singer in the 1970s, before becoming a noted writer and novelist. Dennis Elliott later played in the bands If and Foreigner.

Sequel Records issued an expanded CD edition of Can't Break the Habit in 2000, with reminiscences by Diane Ferraz.

== Discography ==
=== Albums ===
- Can't Break the Habit (Pye NPL 18203, 1967)
- Ferris Wheel (Polydor 583 066, 1970)
- Can't Break the Habit (Castle Music Ltd. 72214, 2002) (Reissue of 1967 LP plus bonus tracks)

=== Singles ===
- "I Can't Break the Habit" / "Number One Guy" (Pye 7N 17387, 1967)
- "Let It Be Me" / "You Look at You" (Pye 7N 17538, 1968)
- "The Na Na Song" / "Three Cool Cats" (Pye 7N 17631, 1968)
- "Can't Stop Now" / "I Know You Well" (Polydor 56366, 1970)
