= (I Believe) Love's a Prima Donna =

1976 song by Steve Harley & Cockney Rebel

Single by Steve Harley & Cockney Rebel

from the album Love's a Prima Donna
- B-side: "Sidetrack 1"
- Released: 1 October 1976
- Genre: Pop, rock
- Length: 4:11
- Label: EMI
- Songwriter: Steve Harley
- Producer: Steve Harley

Steve Harley & Cockney Rebel singles chronology
"Here Comes the Sun" (1976)	"(I Believe) Love's a Prima Donna" (1976)	"(Love) Compared with You" (1977)

"(I Believe) Love's a Prima Donna" is a song by the British rock band Steve Harley & Cockney Rebel, released on 1 October 1976 as the second single from their fifth studio album Love's a Prima Donna. The song was written and produced by Harley. It reached number 41 in the UK Singles Chart and would be the band's last charting single before their split in 1977.

== Background ==
Following the UK Top 10 success of the lead single "Here Comes the Sun" during Summer 1976, "(I Believe) Love's a Prima Donna" was chosen as the second single from Love's a Prima Donna. Released in October, it peaked at number 41 on the UK Singles Chart, remaining in the top 50 for four weeks. The song debuted at number 48 in early November. Like the entire Love's a Prima Donna album, the song was recorded at Abbey Road Studios during sessions between June and September 1976.

== Release ==
"(I Believe) Love's a Prima Donna" was released by EMI Records on 7-inch vinyl in the UK, the Netherlands, Germany, Belgium and Japan. The B-side, "Sidetrack 1", was written and produced by Harley, and has remained exclusive to the single ever since. The follow-up, "Sidetrack 2", appeared as an album track on Love's a Prima Donna.

Following its original release as a single and on Love's a Prima Donna, the song has since appeared on the 1987 Steve Harley & Cockney Rebel compilation Greatest Hits, and the 2006 compilation The Cockney Rebel – A Steve Harley Anthology.

== Promotion ==
No music video was filmed to promote the single. On 21 October 1976, the band appeared on the UK music show Top of the Pops to perform the song. Harley also performed the song, minus the band, on ITV's Supersonic show during the same period.

The song has been performed during the band's live concerts on many occasions. A version was included on the band's 1977 live album Face to Face. In 1989, the band's concert at Brighton, which included the song, was released on the VHS The Come Back, All is Forgiven Tour: Live.

== Critical reception ==
Upon its release as a single, Sue Byrom of Record Mirror described the song as one with "a lot of changes of rhythm and tempo" and a "quick burst of Queen-type backing". She felt the song was "fairly complex", which "might put its chances at risk". Harborough Mail commented, "They've tried hard and the effort should pay off. Meaty, commercially-structured beat blast, full of chunky keyboard and neat pace changes." The Lincolnshire Standard called it "an instantly commercial offering". Mike Pryce of the Worcester Evening News praised it as the band "at their best" and continued, "Faster and fuller than some of their singles, it has a good hook in the way he sings the title line and the rest just flows." Terry Kirby, writing for the Alcester Chronicle, described it as a "magnificent return to form", with Harley "sing[ing] superbly on top of one of the year's most memorable choruses". Caroline Coon of Melody Maker called it an "instantly catchy pop song" that "will leave everyone speechles until it makes the chart – or not". However, she was not a fan of Harley's "ornate [self-]production", which she described as an "attempt at sound-melodrama" and "richness overflow". She wrote, "All the Harley-hooks are out, but, egomania raging, Mr Psychomodo attempts to produce himself like Mahler, Wagner and King Ludwig of Bavaria on a massive trip together. The effect is gross rather than interesting or elaborately deep."

In a 1976 issue of the EMI Records Weekly News magazine Music Talk, Rex Anderson compared the song with "(Love) Compared with You": "'(I Believe) Love's a Prima Donna' is a brilliant contrast. The guy has been through all the different pangs of adolescent love and comes to the realisation that 'love' is a prima donna." Later in the review, Anderson also praised Tony Rivers for his vocal arrangements on the song. In a review of the album, American magazine Billboard picked the song, along with "(Love) Compared with You", as the album's best cuts. In a retrospective review, Donald A. Guarisco of AllMusic commented that the song was one of "Harley's finest songs". He described it as "a bracing song that features the writer waxing comical about the pitfalls of love over a briskly paced pop tune that fleshes out its pub-piano melody with flamenco guitar and a choir".

== Track listing ==
7-inch single

1. "(I Believe) Love's a Prima Donna" – 4:11
2. "Sidetrack 1" (Group Version) – 2:46

7-inch single (alternative release)

1. "(I Believe) Love's a Prima Donna" – 4:11
2. "Sidetrack 1" – 2:46

== Personnel ==
Steve Harley & Cockney Rebel

- Steve Harley – vocals, guitar
- Jim Cregan – guitar, backing vocals
- Duncan Mackay – keyboards
- George Ford – bass, backing vocals
- Stuart Elliott – drums
- Lindsay Elliott – percussion

Additional musicians

- Tony Rivers – backing vocals, backing vocal arrangement
- John G. Perry – backing vocals
- Stuart Calver – backing vocals

Production

- Steve Harley – production
- Tony Clark – sound engineer
- Pat Stapley – assistant sound engineer
- Ken Perry – mastering

== Charts ==
Chart (1976)	Peak position
UK Singles (OCC)	41
