= Mr. Raffles (Man, It Was Mean) =

1975 song by Steve Harley & Cockney Rebel

Single by Steve Harley & Cockney Rebel

from the album The Best Years of Our Lives
- B-side: "Sebastian (Live)"
- Released: 23 May 1975
- Recorded: 1974
- Genre: Rock
- Length: 4:34 (album version); 3:03 (single version)
- Label: EMI
- Songwriter: Steve Harley
- Producers: Steve Harley; Alan Parsons

Steve Harley & Cockney Rebel singles chronology
"Make Me Smile (Come Up and See Me)" (1975)	"Mr. Raffles (Man, It Was Mean)" (1975)	"Black or White" (1975)

"Mr. Raffles (Man, It Was Mean)" is a song by the British rock band Steve Harley & Cockney Rebel, released on 23 May 1975 as the second and final single from their third studio album The Best Years of Our Lives. The song was written by Harley, and produced by Harley and Alan Parsons. "Mr. Raffles (Man, It Was Mean)" reached number 13 in the UK Singles Chart.

== Background ==
"Mr. Raffles (Man, It Was Mean)" was released as the follow-up single to "Make Me Smile (Come Up and See Me)" which reached number one in the UK in February 1975. After The Best Years of Our Lives had reached the UK top 5 in March, "Mr. Raffles" was released in May. It reached number 13 in the UK Singles Chart and remained in the top 50 for six weeks.

The song's titular character refers to the author E. W. Hornung's fictional thief A. J. Raffles. Speaking to Mojo in 2010, Harley said about the song,

"Raffles was a master thief. He was a con artist too. I use his name to invoke a religious allegory, yes. We see religion and its leaders in our own ways: Sham: "Man, it was mean to be seen in the robes you wore for Lent, you must've known that it was Easter." The Devil within: "Then in Amsterdam you were perfect fun. You never let on you had a gun and then you shot that Spanish Dancer." Truthfully, I always think these references and allusions are obvious to listeners, and it feels a little pretentious to explain. It's not T. S. Eliot, I know, but I was a serious young man!"

Harley also told the Sunderland Echo in 1975: "It's a story I've had in me for a long time. It's very metaphorical. It's not really about killing people and slaying babies and things, it's just a way of discussing people sacrificing themselves or even self-destruction."

In a 1996 interview with the Bolton Evening News, Harley picked "Mr. Raffles" as a particular favourite from his own songs as he thought it was "my most complete song".

== Release ==
"Mr. Raffles (Man, It Was Mean)" was released by EMI Records on 7-inch vinyl in the UK, Belgium, Finland, Germany, the Netherlands, Australia, New Zealand and Japan. It was released in Yugoslavia by Jugoton. For its release as a single, "Mr. Raffles" was edited down by a minute and a half to make a three-minute version. This single version remained exclusive to the single until it was included as a bonus track on the 2014 'Definitive Edition' of The Best Years of Our Lives.

The B-side is a live version of "Sebastian", originally recorded by Cockney Rebel for their 1973 debut album The Human Menagerie. Produced by Harley and Parsons, it was recorded at the Hammersmith Odeon, London, on 14 April 1975. In addition to the five main members of Cockney Rebel, the recording also features drummer Stuart Elliott's younger brother Lyndsey Elliott on additional percussion and guitarist Snowy White, who joined the band on The Best Years of Our Lives tour as rhythm guitarist.

== Promotion ==
The band performed the song on the UK music show Top of the Pops, which was broadcast on 5 June 1975. Although the audio from the performance survives, the footage was later wiped by the BBC and is presumed lost.

The song has been performed live by Harley and the band on many occasions, and various live versions have been recorded for official releases. In April 1975, the song was included as part of the band's set at the Hammersmith Odeon. The concert was filmed and released as a film titled Between the Lines. A 1989 performance of the song during the band's concert at Brighton was included on the VHS release The Come Back, All is Forgiven Tour: Live. Another version appears on the 1995 album Live at the BBC, which Harley recorded during a session for Nicky Campbell in 1992.

== Critical reception ==
Upon its release as a single, Sue Byrom of Record Mirror wrote, "If there's one thing the new Harley & Cockney Rebel doesn't seem to be on first hearing, it's commercial. Changes of rhythm, taped cheers, little touch of palm-tree music here and there... commercial? But then you listen again, and again, and yup, somehow it looks like Stevie's going to do it again!" Colin Irwin of Melody Maker described the song as "curiously tuneless affair", but with "enough wayward charm to take it in[to] the chart". He noted the "off-beat continental feel", the "underlying Caribbean flavour that breaks out towards the end" and Harley's "usual exaggeratedly pained" vocal. Irwin predicted the song would be a hit, but felt the song would not repeat the success of its predecessor.

Deborah Thomas of Daily Mirror wrote, "A very peculiar song from Steve Harley & Cockney Rebel. Sounds from the bullring, the fairground and the South Seas cover up something very creepy indeed. A hit." The Irvine Herald stated, "It must be hard to follow such a successful disc as 'Smile' but the Rebel has come up with the right one. Back to the same pace as their first hit. Harley has got a very distinctive voice. Won't be a chart-topper, but a biggie all the same." A reviewer for St Andrews Citizen considered it to be "not so instantly appealing" as "Make Me Smile" as it "lacks the compulsive hook which made its predecessor a biggie", but noted it "nevertheless sports a pleasant combination of reggae and calypso" and is "destined for hitdom". They added that "some cleverly orchestrated instrumentals give this an off-beat attractiveness, and a somewhat subdued Steve sings the lyrics with an underlying current of menance".

In the 1996 book Rock: The Rough Guide, authors Jonathan Buckley and Justin Lewis noted that the song "found Harley at his lyrical best". In a retrospective review of The Best Years of Our Lives, Donald A. Guarisco of AllMusic described the song as a "surreal yet romanticized portrait of a convention-flaunting outlaw" and added, "The odd lyrics work thanks to the phenomenal tune backing them up, which contrasts gentle verses built on piano and acoustic guitar with choruses that work in a surprising but slickly integrated reggae beat". In another AllMusic review of the 1975 compilation A Closer Look, Guarisco described the song as "an impressionistic tune that layers surreal, Bob Dylanesque wordplay over a lushly produced musical backdrop that mixes keyboard-driven soft pop with reggae."

== Track listing ==
7-inch single

1. "Mr. Raffles (Man, It Was Mean)" – 3:03
2. "Sebastian" (Live Version) – 10:49

== Personnel ==
Steve Harley & Cockney Rebel

- Steve Harley – vocals, guitar
- Jim Cregan – guitar, backing vocals
- Duncan Mackay – keyboards
- George Ford – bass, backing vocals
- Stuart Elliott – drums

Production

- Steve Harley – producer
- Alan Parsons – producer, mixer, engineer
- Chris Blair – mastering
- Gary Edwards, Peter James – tape operator

== Charts ==
Chart (1975)	Peak position
Netherlands (Tipparade)	7
UK Singles Chart (The Official Charts Company)	13
