= Videogame Nation (exhibition) =

- Genre: Exhibition
- Venue: Urbis; Woodhorn Museum
- Organized by: David Crookes

Videogame Nation was a UK exhibition looking at the history of British videogames. It showed how videogames have progressed over more than 30 years. Visitors were able to play a wide selection of games including Jet Set Willy, Sensible Soccer, Tomb Raider and Grand Theft Auto. The exhibition highlighted the key people and companies which have contributed to British gaming since its inception.

Curated by videogame journalist David Crookes, Videogame Nation made its debut at the arts centre Urbis in Manchester on 14 May 2009. It ran until 19 September 2009. It visited Woodhorn Museum and Northumberland Archives, on the outskirts of Ashington in the North East of England, in February 2011 for seven months.

== Overview ==
Videogame Nation was split into a number of sections. It started in a bedroom setting, complete with a bed, showcasing games made by small teams, predominantly in the 1980s. It was possible to play Elite, Jet Set Willy, Jetpac and Head over Heels, look at original posters, view a display cabinet packed with retro computer items and see the first issues of Crash magazine. The area explored the work of current retro programmer Jonathan Cauldwell as well as Introversion Software, an indie developer which used to call itself the "Last of the Bedroom Programmers". Visitors were able to create their own pixel art.

Visitors were also able to play a range of driving games and discover more about their evolution. Games include Burnin' Rubber on the GX4000, Micro Machines on the Nintendo Entertainment System, Ferrari Challenge on a PlayStation 3 and Burnout on an Xbox 360.

An arcade section followed, looking at the popularity of arcades in the late 1970s, 1980s and early 1990s. It concentrated on home computer versions of arcade classics including Ghouls 'n Ghosts and Pac-Man World 3. Two arcade cabinets for Rainbow Islands and Ghouls n Ghosts were provided by collector Jonathan Thompson and were the only parts of the exhibition which visitors had to pay extra to use.

An office setting allowed players to see how game development teams have increased in size. There was a display looking at the various jobs carried out by people working in gaming as well as examples of games produced in the late 1980s and 1990s. Among them were Broken Sword, Theme Park and Dizzy. This area also included a Dizzy map, a large display cabinet of original game development documents and posters. There was a particular emphasis on PC games among them Populous.

A mocked-up stadium allowed gamers to play FIFA International Soccer, Sensible Soccer and Kick Off while reclining in seats taken from Manchester City's Maine Road stadium. Astroturf from Manchester City's training ground was also used. The sports section included Virtua Tennis and there was audio from Sensible Software's Jon Hare.

A section which looked at gaming on the go had an area dominated by a bus stop on to which PlayStation Portables were attached. Bus seats opposite had Nintendo DSs attached. The idea was that games could be played anywhere and were not restricted to the home. There was an emphasis on exploration with titles from TTGames' LEGO series and there was a Star Wars Yoda created out of LEGO. Tomb Raider and WipEout were also playable and the area had a sofa and pixellated fire to show the transition from bedroom to living room. Three Elite spacecraft were placed on the wall in a similar manner to the flying ducks in Hilda Ogden's house in Coronation Street. LostWinds was playable on a Nintendo Wii.

A cinema allowed visitors to watch a selection of films including re-runs of GamesMaster and documentaries. There was an 18-rated section looking at Bully and Grand Theft Auto. This also explored controversies including the argument between Manchester Cathedral and Sony over the game Resistance: Fall of Man.

One of the most popular sections allowed visitors to draw their own videogame covers. Many videogame developers including Blitz Games' Philip Oliver contributed.

== Events ==
During its run at Urbis, Videogame Nation had a programme of events which ran throughout the Summer of 2009.

- They were:
- Jon Hare: Playing for England June 14, 2009.
- Getting Dizzy: The Oliver Twins June 28, 2009.
- Matthew Smith: Manic Musings July 19, 2009.
- Retro Revival July 26, 2009.
- The Godfather: David Braben August 9, 2009.
- Bricking it: Arthur Parsons TTGames August 16, 2009.
- Sailing the Ocean Waves September 6, 2009.
- Start a Revolution: Charles Cecil September 13, 2009.

== Reception ==
Videogame Nation was well received by visitors and the press. They included reviews by Negative Gamer
