= Tumbling Down (Cockney Rebel song) =

1974 song by Cockney Rebel

Single by Cockney Rebel

from the album The Psychomodo
- B-side: "Singular Band"
- Released: January 1975
- Recorded: 1974
- Genre: Rock
- Length: 5:55 (album version); 3:23 (single version)
- Label: EMI
- Songwriter: Steve Harley
- Producers: Steve Harley; Alan Parsons

Cockney Rebel singles chronology
"Big Big Deal" (1974)	"Tumbling Down" (1975)	"Make Me Smile (Come Up and See Me)" (1974)

"Tumbling Down" is a song by the British rock band Cockney Rebel, fronted by Steve Harley. It was released in January 1975 as the third and final single from the band's second studio album The Psychomodo (1974). The song was written by Harley, and produced by Harley and Alan Parsons.

== Background ==
"Tumbling Down" was written and first performed by Harley during his days of busking in the early 1970s, before Cockney Rebel were formed in late 1972. The song references Ernest Hemingway, who had a big influence on Harley, and mentions the Titanic sailing into Brighton. Harley believes it was at Brighton, aged three, when he contracted polio. The song's closing refrain ("Oh dear, look what they've done to the blues, blues, blues") has been described as a "put-down of the denim-clad virtuosos that overpopulated 1970s music".

The song was recorded by Cockney Rebel during the February–March 1974 sessions for their second studio album The Psychomodo in 1974, with Andrew Powell providing the orchestral and brass arrangements on the track. The song was mastered at Abbey Road Studios.

When EMI released The Psychomodo in the United States in January 1975, half a year after its release elsewhere, "Tumbling Down" was issued as a single. By this time, the original Cockney Rebel line-up had disbanded owing to internal tensions and disagreements. As a result, the US releases of "Tumbling Down" and The Psychomodo would be credited to the name of the band's new line-up as Steve Harley & Cockney Rebel. It was the band's debut single in the US. Although it was not a single in the UK or Europe, the song remains one of Harley's most popular songs.

== Release ==
"Tumbling Down" was released by EMI Records as a 7-inch single in the United States only. For its release as a single, the six-minute album version of "Tumbling Down" was cut down to almost half the duration. The B-side, "Singular Band", was an album track from The Psychomodo.

Following its release on The Psychomodo and as a single, the song has also appeared on various Steve Harley & Cockney Rebel compilations, including A Closer Look (1975), The Best of Steve Harley and Cockney Rebel (1980), Greatest Hits (1987), The Cream of Steve Harley & Cockney Rebel (1999) and The Cockney Rebel - A Steve Harley Anthology (2006).

== Critical reception ==
In a review of The Psychomodo, Record Mirror described "Tumbling Down" as "grand and orchestrated." In the US, Rick Atkinson of The Record praised "Tumbling Down" as an "excellent track with FM-radio potential". Jon Marlowe of The Miami News, in his 1976 review of Love's a Prima Donna, referred to "Tumbling Down" as one of the "two all-time classic songs" Harley had written, alongside "Cavaliers". He added, "...to hear Harley lead the audience in a rousing sing-along of 'Oh dear look what they've done to the blues' is nothing short of a musical miracle."

Dave Thompson of AllMusic retrospectively said that "Tumbling Down," along with the preceding track on The Psychomodo, "Sling It", "encompasses ten of the most heart-stoppingly breathless, and emotionally draining minutes in '70s rock". He continued, "though ["Tumbling Down"]'s final refrain was reduced to pitifully parodic singalong the moment it got out on-stage, on record it retains both its potency and its purpose." Donald A. Guarisco of AllMusic referred to the song as a "dramatic opus that gradually builds from quiet piano chords to an orchestral blowout as Harley vocalizes a pained but elegantly crafted tale of facing a grim destiny".

In 2012, Jim Wirth of Uncut wrote, "Harley signs off in style on 'Tumbling Down', with the John Cale-ish screams in the big pay-off line 'Oh dear, look what they've done to the blues', a barbed combination of anti-Ten Years After harangue and self-reverential gloating."

== Live performances ==
At the time of its release, "Tumbling Down" became Harley's regular concert closer, with the well-known closing refrain ("Oh dear, look what they've done to the blues, blues, blues") allowing the audience to participate by chanting the line with Harley. It quickly became, as Harley described in 1977, the "pièce de résistance" for his audiences. As a result of its regular airing during the band's concerts, various live versions have been recorded for official releases. On 14 April 1975, Steve Harley & Cockney Rebel performed the song as part of their set at the Hammersmith Odeon, which was filmed and released as a film titled Between the Lines. The song has also been included on Face to Face: A Live Recording (1977), Live from London (1985) and Birmingham (Live with Orchestra & Choir) (2013). Two acoustic versions have also appeared on Harley's live albums Stripped to the Bare Bones (1999) and Acoustic and Pure: Live (2003).

During the band's UK summer tour in 1990, "Tumbling Down" was not included in the set-list. On stage at Frankfurt's Music-Hall in February 1992, Harley expressed how he had become tired of performing the song since its release in 1974. He stated, "Sometimes you think you've sung a song once too often. I stopped singing this song for a long time and I kept meeting people outside stage doors who would say things like, 'Steve, where is 'Tumbling Down'?' And I'd say 'I'm bored with it, tired of it, it's an old song and there's so many new songs'." After the tour, Harley and his brother Ian Nice, who at the time played keyboards in Cockney Rebel, looked at returning the song to the set-list. Harley revealed, "I went back to the drawing board, and brother Ian and I decided that there's nothing wrong with the song. [We] just [had] to try it another way, come at it from another direction." The decision was made to strip back the song for future performances by removing guitar, bass and drums, and making it piano and keyboard-focused. The addition of harmonica was intended to make it more like how Harley played it in his busking days in the early 1970s.

After the addition of the harmonica, the arrangement of the song would remain largely unchanged for the next three decades, with Harley's acoustic formats (from 1998) and rock band formats keeping the same basic arrangement that was established in 1992. The only two exceptions to this was firstly when the keyboards were substituted for acoustic guitar during keyboard-free acoustic tours, a format which would occasionally carry over into the same given year's rock band tour. The second was when the guitar-only format was used consistently during Harley's 3-man acoustic tours between 2010 and 2019. The arrangement of the song would, however, be significantly altered for Harley's December 2022 rock band tour, which merged Harley's 4-man acoustic format with the rock band, and celebrated the 50th anniversary of Harley's career. This arrangement was much more violin-heavy than previous versions, harkening back to early performances of the song in 1973 and 1974, and had almost no keyboard in it compared to the 1992 arrangement. Harley's harmonica playing remained in this arrangement. This new version would carry over into Harley's 2023 acoustic tour. It was also around this time that the song's position in the set-list was changed so that it was consistently the song before "Sebastian", usually the antepenultimate song of the night. Harley never revealed why he altered the arrangement of the song for the December 2022 tour (Harley's acoustic band format would play an all-guitar version similar to that done between 1998 and 2005 as late as May 2022).

== Track listing ==
7-inch single (US)

1. "Tumbling Down" – 3:23
2. "Singular Band" – 3:00

7-inch promotional single (US)

1. "Tumbling Down" (Stereo) – 3:23
2. "Tumbling Down" (Mono) – 3:23

== Personnel ==
Cockney Rebel

- Steve Harley – vocals
- Jean-Paul Crocker – electric violin, guitar
- Milton Reame-James – keyboards
- Paul Jeffreys – Fender bass
- Stuart Elliott – drums, percussion

Additional personnel

- Andrew Powell – orchestral and brass arrangements

Production

- Steve Harley, Alan Parsons – producers
- Chris Blair – mastering

== Cover versions ==
=== Yvonne Keeley version ===
"Tumbling Down"

Single by Yvonne Keeley
- B-side: "Loretta's Tale"
- Released: 23 August 1974
- Genre: Rock
- Length: 4:25
- Label: EMI
- Songwriter: Steve Harley
- Producers: Steve Harley; Alan Parsons

Yvonne Keeley singles chronology
"Tumbling Down" (1974)	"Concrete and Clay" (1975)

In 1974, Dutch singer Yvonne Keeley released her own version of the song as a non-album single. Like Cockney Rebel's original, Keeley's version was produced by Harley and Parsons.

Keeley recorded "Tumbling Down" shortly after the split of the original Cockney Rebel line-up in July of that year. Keeley and Harley were already in a relationship and started working in the studio together, with Keeley recording "Tumbling Down" and another Cockney Rebel song, "Loretta's Tale", which was originally recorded for their 1973 debut album The Human Menagerie. The two tracks were recorded at Abbey Road Studios in London. Speaking of the single, Harley told Rock Scene in 1975: "I was quite happy with the way that one came out. I think she has one of the best white female voices I've ever heard."

Scottish musician Ian Bairnson recorded the guitar part on "Tumbling Down" with a Les Paul. It was one of the guitarist's earliest sessions and the one which had the most impact on his career. At the time, Bairnson had moved from Edinburgh to London to make it in the music business with the Scottish rock band Pilot, who had yet to gain a hit single. After being impressed by his playing on the song, Harley asked Bairnson to join Cockney Rebel, at a time when Harley was in the process of forming a new Cockney Rebel line-up. Faced with this dilemma, Bairnson ended up choosing to stay with his band, who gained their first hit with "Magic" later in November that year.

EMI rush-released Keeley's version of "Tumbling Down" as a single on 23 August 1974 to coincide with Cockney Rebel's appearance at the Reading Festival on 25 August. The Eastern Evening News noted that Keeley "handles Harley's work well" on both the A-side and B-side. Keeley would go on to provide backing vocals on future Steve Harley & Cockney Rebel albums and Harley also produced her next single, "Concrete and Clay", which was released in June 1975.

=== Velvet Goldmine ===
"Tumbling Down" was featured in the 1998 British-American drama film Velvet Goldmine, directed and co-written by Todd Haynes. The fictional band who covered the song for the film soundtrack were Venus in Furs and lead vocals were handled by Jonathan Rhys Meyers. Meyers would also cover Cockney Rebel's "Sebastian" for the film, while the Steve Harley & Cockney Rebel recording of "Make Me Smile (Come Up and See Me)" was featured over the ending credits. Meyers' version of "Tumbling Down" was made available on the Velvet Goldmine original motion picture soundtrack release.

Speaking to the Swedish web publication Bomben in 2000, Harley said of the version:

"I was never much of a part of all that [glam rock]. More theatrical for one album, I suppose. But it ended there. When my friends and I first saw Velvet Goldmine, we thought, 'straight to video.' i.e.: not much of a film, really. My opinion was not improved after seeing it a second time, I'm afraid. I was only caught up at all when the Bowie character 'recorded his video' for his 'new single' 'Tumbling Down'. I thought there was magic about the shoot. But in all it isn't the best portrayal of a hedonistic time, simply because it was made by an American who really never was part of it all."

Later in 2010, Harley told independent.ie website:

"Velvet Goldmine... actually, I saw that in the cinema. I'm one of the few! It didn't run for very long. We were invited to the opening in Edinburgh. When it finished my tour manager stood up and said, 'straight to video'. I understand Bowie refused to let them use his music. I agreed they could use mine. Thank you David (hah!). God bless you mate. It's always flattering that people would do one of your songs."

=== MonaLisa Twins version ===
MonaLisa Twins released the song on their album The Duo Sessions in 2025.
