= Love's a Prima Donna =

Studio album by Steve Harley & Cockney Rebel
- Released: 5 November 1976 (UK); 10 January 1977 (US)
- Recorded: June–September 1976
- Genre: Glam rock
- Length: 45:39
- Label: EMI
- Producer: Steve Harley

Steve Harley & Cockney Rebel chronology
Timeless Flight (1976)	Love's a Prima Donna (1976)	Face to Face: A Live Recording (1977)

Singles from Love's a Prima Donna
- 1. "Here Comes the Sun" Released: 23 July 1976; 2. "(I Believe) Love's a Prima Donna" Released: 1 October 1976; 3. "(Love) Compared with You" Released: March 1977 (US only)

Love's a Prima Donna is the fifth studio album by Steve Harley & Cockney Rebel, released by EMI on 5 November 1976. It was produced by Harley, and would be the band's last album before splitting in 1977.

== Background ==
Harley began writing material for Love's a Prima Donna while Steve Harley & Cockney Rebel were touring to promote their 1976 album Timeless Flight. Recording sessions for the new album took place at Abbey Road Studios in London from June to September 1976. Once completed, guitarist Jim Cregan left Cockney Rebel to join Rod Stewart's touring band.

The album's concept revolves around the theme of love, including "true love, lost love, mother-and-child love, soldier loneliness, valentine sentimentalism and a fan's infatuation with a musician". In a 1977 interview with Trouser Press, Harley summarised, "The whole album is a parcel of love attitudes. Every song is a different aspect of the emotion we call love. Without wanting to sound pretentious, it's a simple concept." The album also showcases a range of musical styles, including progressive rock, folk, doo-wop, and reggae. Harley did not originally intend to write an album with a particular theme. He told Sounds in 1977, "I never planned it. [It] didn't come about until something like the fifth song had been recorded. It was then that I suddenly realised that all the numbers were heading along the same line, all my trains were on the same track."

Speaking to Melody Maker in early 1977, Harley commented,

"I feel on this album I achieve something as a singer, producer and songwriter. If it only sold three copies, I wouldn't worry. The achievement is more important than the success. This is entirely autobiographical: it's the only way I can write. I did a lot of it with the running order in mind. I wrote for two months before we went into the studio and the pattern was obvious when I started writing: 'Seeking a Love' had to open the album. There's a lot of different music styles that are confusing some people. It's taken the maturity of an older man to come out and say things in the first person. When I first started writing the album, six of the lyrics dealt with love. So I thought I'd follow this with the rest of it. It's an album which dwells on the emotion we call love. I became very confident writing this album. I've come back stronger now 'cause I believe in myself. I like writing all about human relationships. There is also humour in this LP: 'GI Valentine,' and 'Give Me More'.

In 2015, Harley revealed to Guitar & Bass the albums that have most influenced him, with one being Love's a Prima Donna. He revealed, "This is not self-indulgence, I swear! I gave free rein to Jim Cregan during the recordings and he rewarded me with some brilliant parts, which I could harmonise with the keyboards. The more outlandish my production became, the more Jim pushed himself. Cockney Rebel started as a non-guitar band, and here we are offering up lashings of electric mayhem!"

== Song information ==
"G.I. Valentine", "Finally a Card Came", "Innocence and Guilt" and "Is It True What They Say?" all feature the use of the EMI voice vocoder. Harley has described "G.I. Valentine" and "Finally a Card Came" as being "almost a tribute to Frank Zappa". "Sidetrack II" is preceded by a non-album track, "Sidetrack 1", which was released as the B-side to "(I Believe) Love's a Prima Donna". It is the same song but where "Sidetrack II" is the "orchestral version" with a 50-piece orchestra and choir, "Sidetrack 1" is performed by Cockney Rebel using synthesisers, piano, electric guitar and percussion. Originally written at the piano, Harley wanted to "bring another dimension" to the track but felt it would have been "too self-indulgent" to include both versions on the album. "(If This Is Love) Give Me More", which Harley has described as a "spoof 50s doo-wop rock piece" with a "70s spoof lyric and 70s recording techniques", features him playing electric guitar for the first time on record.

"Here Comes the Sun", the 1969 George Harrison-penned song originally recorded by the Beatles, was the first cover version that the band recorded. Harley chose to cover the song after he heard it on the radio while travelling by taxi in London. He interpreted the lyrics as referring to an "apocalypse", "great awakening" and "massive change", and, in response, emphasised the use of musical accents in its recording. As a single, it was backed by the non-album track, "Lay Me Down". "Innocence and Guilt" has been described by Harley as being about wanting to "return to the womb". He revealed in further detail to Sounds in 1977, "You can take [the song] three ways – it's like a cry from the womb, or it's a spirit saying, 'Don't reincarnate me', or it's a human being alive on the street saying, 'For Christ's sakes, mama, repossess me'. It's that mother fixation, Oedipus complex, I'm saying, 'Well, hello mum, I've earned X million dollars and I live this kind of lifestyle, but really I'm awfully lonely mum, repossess me, teach me yet again, teach me properly this time, how does one cope, because regardless of material earnings one is still a very lonely person."

== Release ==
While recording sessions for the album continued, EMI released "Here Comes the Sun" as a single in July 1976. Reaching number ten in the UK Singles Chart, the song's success coincided with an unusually hot British summer. Love's a Prima Donna was released by EMI in November 1976 and reached number 28 in the UK Albums Chart. During the same month, "(I Believe) Love's a Prima Donna" was released as the album's second single and peaked at number 41 in the UK Singles Chart. EMI originally intended to release "(Love) Compared with You" as the third UK single, but the release was cancelled, although the song was later released as the album's only US single. Love's a Prima Donna was released in the US on 10 January 1977.

The album received its first CD release by EMI in 1990. In 2001, BGO Records released the album as a double CD set with the band's 1976 US compilation A Closer Look.

== Tour ==
Following the album's release, the band embarked on an eight-date UK tour from 2 to 12 December 1976. For the tour, Cregan was replaced by Jo Partridge, who first joined the band as rhythm guitarist on the Timeless Flight tour. Partridge contributed to the recording of two tracks on Love's a Prima Donna, providing guitar and backing vocals on "Here Comes the Sun", and backing vocals on "(If This Is Love) Give Me More". During the tour, Harley had a number of the concerts recorded, which he used to create the double live album Face to Face: A Live Recording. It was released in 1977 and includes six tracks from Love's a Prima Donna.

== Critical reception ==
Professional ratings
Review scores
Source	Rating
Record Mirror	5/5 stars
Sounds	5/5 stars

On its release, Geoff Barton of Sounds commented, "Love's a Prima Donna goes closer to the bone than ever before. In the past, Harley's lyrics have tended to be oblique and obscure. With this album, however, he appears to be laying his life on the line – and it's often quite a painful thing to see. The album is loosely conceptual, each sentiment comes across intensely, cutting through the listener like a keen blade. Suffice it to say that it is an incredible album, the playing and its overall structure being unparalleled, voice effects and stacatto instrumental breaks abounding. Love's a Prima Donna is often amusing, sometimes embarrassing, but also – in a twisted, tangled sort of way – infinitely enjoyable." Barry Cain of Record Mirror wrote, "Choirs, nursery noises, nubile Lancashire lasses, you name it – Steve Harley's got it on his new album. He uses every conceivable gimmick in the book on this, his strongest LP to date. So what if the guy can't sing a note. He doesn't seem to be taking himself quite so seriously these days... and that makes for a flexible, more relaxed sound. A great album."

Ray Coleman of Melody Maker believed Love's a Prima Donna was a "more convincing piece of work" than the "aimless" Timeless Flight, with "loads of drama expertly set off against choral work in the arrangements, and Harley sounding more confident and assertive". He noted that, using "some starkly imaginative instrumental passages allied to some piercing lyrics both sentimental and uncompromisingly stabbing", Harley "documents the frustrations of a love affair with [his] customary spikiness". He concluded, "Instrumentally, this is a first-class record, with especially fine work by keyboardist Duncan Mackay. Lyrically, and in song composition, it's like Harley always is – patchy, occasionally strident and even pretentious, but overall a success, a vast improvement on his last outing. The guy's tormented, and therefore never less than interesting." A reviewer for the Shropshire Star stated, "Harley's fifth album – billed as his most ambitious – is certainly different but might be seen in parts as resorting to gimmickry. Harley fans, however, will be suitably impressed. Me, too."

Rex Anderson, writing for the EMI Records Weekly News magazine Music Talk, said, "The album is Steve's look at love. He sees it as a necessary evil, as something both dirty and beautiful. Much of it is, of necessity, sexual, but it is also comic and tragic. Musically the album is a masterpiece." Paul Phillips of National RockStar said, "'Here Comes The Sun' bears all the hallmarks of the accomplished lyricist desperately attempting to become the acclaimed musician/arranger - mistaking clumsiness for cleverness and arrogance for art. Unfortunately, these faults permeate the entire album. '(Love) Compared With You' and 'Carry Me Again' are two tracks which work, not because they are simple songs, but because they are simply presented. What spoils the rest of the album is the desperation which attends Harley's efforts to be musical/innovative/disturbing. A pity that such a promising and outrageous talent as Harley's should be allowed to stoop to the low level which this album achieves." Vic Rodrick of the Linlithgowshire Journal & Gazette called it "mostly self-indulgent rubbish with one exception – 'Here Comes the Sun' – the only song not written by Harley".

In the US, Jon Marlowe of The Miami News concluded, "This is the one that should make Harley/Cockney Rebel as big in America as they are in their native England. With Love's a Prima Donna, Harley has decided to undertake the tattered and worn idea of a concept LP - but don't fear, the kid pulls it off in grande musical style." Henry McNulty of the Hartford Courant wrote, "Steve Harley and his band combine three separate trends in British rock: artiness of the Roxy-Bowie school, lyrical complexity, and a touch of heavy metal. Love's a Prima Donna is an excellent showcase for the band." Cash Box commented: "Harley's efforts to break big in the U.S. rock market have not been outstanding, although he always seems to make a dent. The import version has gotten play, but the album is uneven and at times esoteric."

=== Retrospective reviews ===
Professional ratings
Review scores
Source	Rating
AllMusic	4/5 stars

Donald A. Guarisco of AllMusic, retrospectively wrote, "This album allowed [Harley] to give full vent to his romantic thoughts via lushly crafted songs about the travails of love. Harley's ambitions occasionally overwhelm him, but the best songs rank with Harley's finest work and the album manages to overcome its occasional excesses thanks to a crisp, consistent production that keeps its genre-hopping sounding smooth. In short, it takes a few listens to assimilate, but it is an impressively crafted album that offers plenty of rewards for Harley fans and anyone who can appreciate glam rock at its most artsy."

== Track listing ==
All tracks are written by Steve Harley except "Here Comes the Sun" by George Harrison.

No.	Title	Length
1.	"Seeking a Love"	0:43
2.	"G.I. Valentine"	1:29
3.	"Finally a Card Came"	2:28
4.	"Too Much Tenderness"	4:16
5.	"(Love) Compared with You"	4:20
6.	"(I Believe) Love's a Prima Donna"	4:11
7.	"Sidetrack II"	3:13
8.	"Seeking a Love, Pt. 2"	1:09
9.	"If This Is Love (Give Me More)"	4:25
10.	"Carry Me Again"	4:30
11.	"Here Comes the Sun"	2:55
12.	"Innocence and Guilt"	7:13
13.	"Is It True What They Say?"	4:41

== Personnel ==
Steve Harley & Cockney Rebel

- Steve Harley – vocals, electric guitar (track 9)
- Jim Cregan – lead guitar
- Duncan Mackay – keyboards
- George Ford – bass guitar
- Stuart Elliott – drums
- Lindsey Elliott – percussion

Additional musicians

- Jo Partridge – guitar (track 11), backing vocals (tracks 9, 11)
- Tony Rivers – backing vocals (various tracks), backing vocal arrangement (tracks 5–6, 10)
- John G. Perry – backing vocals (various tracks)
- Stuart Calver – backing vocals (various tracks)
- Yvonne Keeley – backing vocals (track 2)
- English Chamber Choir – choir (tracks 1, 7–8)

Production

- Steve Harley – producer
- Wilf Gibson – choir arrangements (tracks 1, 8), string section score (track 5), orchestral arrangement (track 7)
- Tony Clark – engineer
- Pat Stapley – assistant engineer
- Ken Perry – mastering

Design

- Julie Harris – outer sleeve art direction for Splash Studios
- Mick Rock – inner bag art direction
- John Harwood – front sleeve colouring

== Charts ==
Chart (1976–77)	Peak position
UK Albums Chart	28
US Record World 151-200 Album Chart	193

== Certifications ==
Region	Certification	Certified units/sales
United Kingdom (BPI)	Silver	60,000^{^}
^{^} Shipments figures based on certification alone.
