= The Bolton News =

Daily newspaper and news website in northwestern England

- (c) Newsquest
- Type: Daily newspaper
- Format: Tabloid
- Owner: USA Today Co.
- Founder: W. F. Tillotson
- Publisher: Newsquest
- Editor: Richard Duggan
- Founded: 1867
- Headquarters: Bolton, England
- Circulation: 3,375 (as of 2024)
- Sister newspapers: Bury Times, The Messenger, Lancashire Telegraph and The Oldham Times.
- ISSN: 1752-3001
- Website: theboltonnews.co.uk

The Bolton News – formerly the Bolton Evening News – is a daily newspaper and news website covering the towns of Bolton and Bury in north-western England. Published each morning from Monday to Saturday and online every day, it is part of the Newsquest media group, a subsidiary of the U.S media giant Gannett Inc. The current editor is Richard Duggan, who also oversees other titles in the North West of England.

== Briefly ==
The Bolton News has an approximate circulation of 7,589.

On 11 September 2006 the Bolton Evening News became The Bolton News, which saw the newspaper being sold from the morning onwards. It considered several names, including Bolton Daily News and Bolton News. Newsquest bought these internet domain names in May 2006.

The editor of The Bolton News is Richard Duggan (who also oversees other newspapers in the North West as Regional Editor, including the Lancashire Telegraph, Bury Times, The Oldham Times and The Messenger. Saiqa Chaudhari is the audience and content editor for the website, while Roger Airey is in charge of print production. The sports editor is David Pye and the chief football correspondent is Marc Iles.

== In depth ==
The Bolton Evening News was Britain's first community evening halfpenny newspaper. The only other evening paper to publish before The Bolton Evening News was the Shipping Gazette in South Shields.

The first edition of The Bolton Evening News was founded by the Tillotson family and was published on Tuesday 19 March 1867 – with the front page entirely devoted to adverts. But the origins of the paper stretch way back to 1834 when John Tillotson was apprenticed to printer Robert Marsden Holden, who had premises in Mealhouse Lane, Bolton. Tillotson eventually married his boss's daughter and took over the business in 1850. His son, William Frederick Tillotson, became apprenticed to his father. He managed to persuade his father to help him launch the first Bolton Evening News, which stretched to four pages. William Frederick Tillotson married Mary Lever on 20 April 1870. Severe difficulties dogged WF Tillotson's early enterprise but he persevered and the Evening News really took off under the first editor William Brimelow. Legend has it that the job application process then could be traumatic. Brimelow is said to have had a habit of throwing a book on the ground just as potential applicants entered the office to see what their reaction was.

Following on from the success of the evening paper the weekly Journals followed: Bolton Weekly Journal 1871 (which merged with the Bolton Guardian in 1893 to become the Bolton Journal and Guardian), Farnworth Weekly Journal 1873, Leigh, Tyldesley and Atherton Journal 1874, Eccles and Patricroft Journal 1874, Horwich and Westhoughton Journal 1925, and the Stretford and Urmston in 1960.

Tillotson's Fiction Bureau, founded by WF Tillotson in 1873, played an important role in publishing late Victorian and early-20th-century literature.

WF Tillotson died in 1889, leaving his widow and six children. In addition to the newspaper the Tillotson family also developed their general printing and carton making businesses. Mary Tillotson, widow of WF Tillotson, was a business partner in the Bolton Evening News; John Lever Tillotson left the Bolton Evening News to join the board of Lever Brothers.

The paper went from strength to strength and outgrew its primitive origins in a hand-fed printer and in 1876 a Victory printing and folding machine was acquired with a capacity of printing 16,000 copies an hour. The Tillotsons remained owners of the Evening News into the latter part of the 20th century, but the days of family-owned newspapers were drawing to a close and in 1971 the Tillotsons sold the company to St Regis International of New York. From then on change happened rapidly. St Regis sold the group to Reed International in 1982 and the Bolton Evening News became the largest of its titles.

In 1987 the paper relocated to Newspaper House in Churchgate and the old building in Mealhouse Lane became the Shipgates shopping centre, later becoming part of Crompton Place shopping arcade.

In September 2006 the paper was renamed The Bolton News. The rename came about as the paper is now delivered from the morning onwards. On 11 June 2009 the sub-editors in the editorial department were moved to Blackburn, working from the offices of the Lancashire Telegraph. It meant the production of pages for The Bolton News were created away from Bolton for the first time in the publication's history.

At the start of 2009, the Bury Times operation was merged with The Bolton News. The Bury Times office in Market Street was sold to Bury College. The Bury Times is now largely produced in Bolton and Blackburn and in April 2013, it was revamped with more pages and a £1 price point.

In 2011, The Bolton News looked towards digital production, expanding into the smartphone app market, launching Bolton and Bury Football for Apple iOS devices, and producing ebooks for the iPad and Kindle.

In October 2012, The Bolton News relocated to The Wellsprings, Bolton, taking over the former Barclays Bank after the lease on Newspaper House came to an end. The newspaper was given a fresh look and increased price in May 2013 but it led to a 32 per cent drop in circulation.

In 2023, Bolton based British-Indian Entrepreneur Dr Prash Ladva, was crowned Young Entrepreneur of the Year.

== Editors ==
The Bolton News has had just 15 editors but it functioned without anyone officially being designated editor until William Brimelow was confirmed in the post in 1871.

- 1871–1913: William Brimelow
- 1913–27: Frederick L. Tillotson
- 1927–41: Issac Edwards
- 1941–45: Frederick Tillotson
- 1945–65: Frank Singleton
- 1965–79: Tom Cooke
- 1979–87: Leslie Gent
- 1987–92: Chris Walder
- 1992–97: Andrew Smith
- 1997–2001: Mark Rossiter
- 2001–08: Steve Hughes
- 2008–18: Ian Savage
- 2018–20: Karl Holbrook
- 2020-22: Steven Thompson
- 2022–present: Richard Duggan

== Online editors ==
The Bolton News has had five dedicated online editors who have overseen theboltonnews.co.uk and burytimes.co.uk. Before 2005, there was no single online editor.

- 2005–09: Chris Sudlow
- 2009–13: David Crookes
- 2013–2015: Julian Thorpe
- 2015–2017: Melanie Disley
- 2017–2018: Matthew Taylor

== History ==
- 1867: Bolton Evening News launched on 19 March by W F Tillotson, first halfpenny evening paper in the country, in Mawdsley Street.
- 1868: Founder members of Press Association.
- 1871: William Brimelow was appointed the first official editor.
- 1889: W F Tillotson died at the age of 44.
- 1894: First daily newspaper in Britain to produce a photograph by the halftone process.
- 1926: One of the first offices outside London to be equipped with Cread-Wheatstone apparatus which bought both home and foreign news over a landline into the offices.
- 1956: Fred Tillotson, son of W F, retired, having guided the company both as director and chairman (and on a couple of occasions as editor) since 1901.
- 1962: The Evening News made newspaper history when, for first time in a British paper, all editions contained a full-page printed in Hi-Fi colour.
- 1967: Bolton Evening News named as country's best designed newspaper.
- 1971: Tillotsons Ltd. bought by St Regis Paper Company of New York, and Marcus Tillotson, the last of the founding family to be connected with the Bolton Evening News and Chairman since 1956, retired.
- 1976: Old hot metal process of production replaced by computerised photo-setting.
- 1982: Company sold to Reed International.
- 1985: A historic breakthrough in newspaper production when the company signed a single-keying agreement with its National Graphical Association tele-ad staff, first of its kind in the UK provincial newspaper industry.
- 1987: The company relocated from Mealhouse Lane to Newspaper House in Churchgate. At same time the paper opened an out-of-town publishing centre at Lostock, and converted from letterpress to printing web-offset.
- 1989: Full electronic page make-up introduced, making the company the first in the world to achieve the complete electronic newspaper where stories, photographs and advertisement processed by computer from the moment of compilation almost to point where paper is printed.
- 1991: As company ownership of newspapers expanded rapidly, the Lancashire Evening Telegraph and its associated weekly newspapers were bought from Thomson Newspapers, also to be printed at Bolton.
- 1996: Newsquest founded in management buy-out from Reed.
- 1996: Bolton Evening News website – thisisbolton.co.uk – is launched.
- 1999: Newsquest became part of Gannett.
- 2001: Printing presses opened at Wingates Industrial Estate.
- 2005: Marcus Tillotson died at the age of 89.
- 2006: The newspaper's name is changed to The Bolton News to reflect changing reader habits and lifestyles.
- 2008: Website re-launched with new look as www.theboltonnews.co.uk
- 2009: The £17m, purpose-built printing facility at Wingates Industrial Estate, Bolton closed and was later sold for £2m. Printing of The Bolton News moved to North Wales.
- 2009: The Bury Times operation moved to The Bolton News offices.
- 2009: The sale of the Bury Times Market Street office to Bury College was completed.
- 2009: The sub-editors in The Bolton News editorial department moved to Blackburn.
- 2011: The Bolton News expanded into smartphone app production, launching Bolton and Bury Football for Apple iOS devices.
- 2012: Exploring the emergence of tablet computing, The Bolton News launched its special book, Wanderers Legends, for the iPad and Kindle.
- 2012: The newspaper relocated from Newspaper House to The Wellsprings in Victoria Square.
- 2013: The Bolton News gave the paper a fresh look and launched a standalone weekend magazine with a seven-day TV listings guide; this later folded into the run-of-paper as a cost-cutting measure.
- 2013: The newspaper increased in price from 45p to a record high of 80p on a Saturday but later fell to 65p. The Monday-to-Friday price increased from 45p to 65p. Circulation dropped by 32 per cent.
- 2015: Three photographers, two feature writers, a news editor, one sport content editor/writer, one content editor, an editorial content assistant and a graphic artist are made redundant following a revision of staffing numbers at many local papers by parent company Newsquest.
- 2018: Daily circulation drops to an all-time low of 8,166. New editor, Karl Holbrook, is appointed.
- 2019: Circulation drops again, to 7,873 and then further to 7,589 in line with wider industry. Digital growth hits all time highs.
- 2019: The editorial departments of The Bolton News and Lancashire Telegraph are centralised into a regional news team.
- 2020: Karl Holbrook announces he is joining the Northern Echo.
- 2020: Steven Thompson becomes the 14th editor and remains in this position for one year and two months, making him the shortest-serving editor of The Bolton News.
- 2021: Richard Duggan appointed editor.
- 2022: The Bolton News moves out of its premises in Victoria Square and into Knowsley House.

== Former journalists ==
- Graham Gibbons (1930-2024)
