= George Ford (bassist) =

British bassist (1940–2007)

- Born: George Sweetnam; 1940
- Died: 9 March 2007 (aged 67)
- Occupation: Musician
- Instrument: Bass guitar
- Years active: 1959–1992
- Formerly of: Emile Ford & the Checkmates, The Ferris Wheel, Roy Young Band, Medicine Head, Steve Harley & Cockney Rebel, The Shadows, Long John Baldry

George Ford (born George Sweetnam and also known as George Sweetnam-Ford) (1940 – 9 March 2007) was a bassist born in Saint Lucia, British Windward Islands. He is best known for being a member of Emile Ford & the Checkmates and Steve Harley & Cockney Rebel.

== Background ==
Ford was born in Castries, Saint Lucia in the British Windward Islands in 1940. He and his family moved to England from the Bahamas in the mid-1950s. According to The Stage, Ford and his half brother Emile Ford were originally studying for a degree in the late 1950s. They performed in coffee bars and talent contests in their spare time and were spotted by a talent scout in 1958, who persuaded them to abandon their education and become full time entertainers.

Ford then began his musical career as the bassist in his half brother's band, Emile Ford & the Checkmates, formed in 1959. The band were popular in the UK in the late 1950s and early 1960s, scoring eight hits, including the number one "What Do You Want to Make Those Eyes at Me For?" in 1959. The Checkmates continued to perform and record after breaking away from band leader Emile Ford in 1961.

In 1967, Ford joined the rock and soul band The Ferris Wheel. In the early 1970s, he was in the Roy Young Band, then he joined Medicine Head in October 1973, performing on their 1974 album Thru' A Five.

Ford was the bassist in Steve Harley & Cockney Rebel between 1974 and 1977. The band achieved four UK hit albums and four UK hit singles during that time, including the number one single "Make Me Smile (Come Up and See Me)" in 1975.

Ford was also a successful session bassist in the 1970s. He performed on albums by Meic Stevens, Linda Lewis, Doris Troy, Al Stewart (including his 1976 hit album Year of the Cat), Peter Skellern, Patricia Paay and Cherry Vanilla. He also toured with the Shadows in 1980. In 1980, he released his only solo single, "What Am I Gonna Do"/"You Were My Everything", on the Blue September label. "What Am I Gonna Do", which was co-produced with Skellern, was reviewed favourably by Music Week, who called it "offbeat reggae with tantalizing girls running fraction behind lead, picks up engaging pace".

Ford emigrated to Canada in the 1980s. He played bass in Long John Baldry's band between 1983 and 1992.

== Death ==
Ford died in Canada on 9 March 2007 at the age of 67. He was survived by his wife, Irene, and his daughters, Susanne and Jacqui.

== Discography ==
=== The Ferris Wheel ===
- Ferris Wheel (1970)

=== Steve Harley & Cockney Rebel ===
- The Best Years of Our Lives (1975)
- Timeless Flight (1976)
- Love's a Prima Donna (1976)
- Face to Face: A Live Recording (1977)

=== Long John Baldry ===
- A Touch of the Blues (1990)

=== Session work ===
- Meic Stevens – Outlander (1970)
- Linda Lewis – Say No More (1971)
- Doris Troy and the Gospel Truth – Rainbow Testament (1972)
- Al Stewart – Modern Times (1975)
- Peter Skellern – Hard Times (1975)
- Patricia Paay – Beam of Light (1975)
- Al Stewart – Year of the Cat (1976)
- Peter Skellern – Kissing in the Cactus (1977)
- Cherry Vanilla – Bad Girl (1978)
- Cherry Vanilla – Venus d'Vinyl (1979)

=== Solo work ===
- "What Am I Gonna Do"/"You Were My Everything" (1980)
