= Bom-Bane's =

Café and performance venue in Brighton, England

Coordinates: 50°49′19″N 00°08′04″W

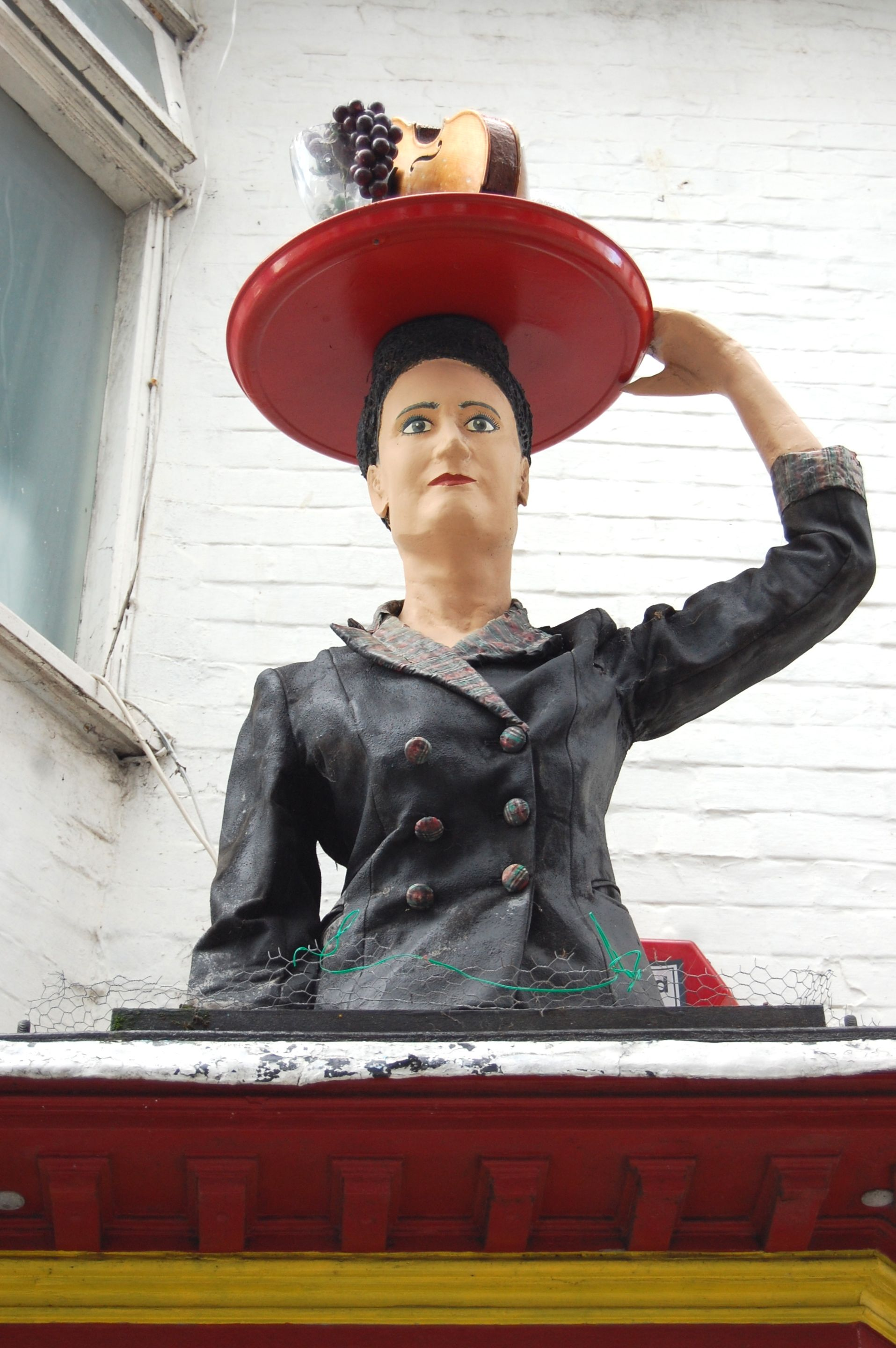
Jane Bom-Bane's statue with a revolving tray on her head, outside the café

Bom-Bane's is a café and performance venue founded in 2006 by Jane Bom-Bane on George Street, Brighton, UK. It has singing staff and eccentric décor. In 2007, Bom-Bane's won the ThreeWeeks Editors award for the best venue in the Brighton Fringe Festival. In 2012, Bom-Bane's was featured on the Canadian reality television show, World's Weirdest Restaurants. In 2016, it was highlighted on BBC Radio 3's The Verb.

== Venue ==
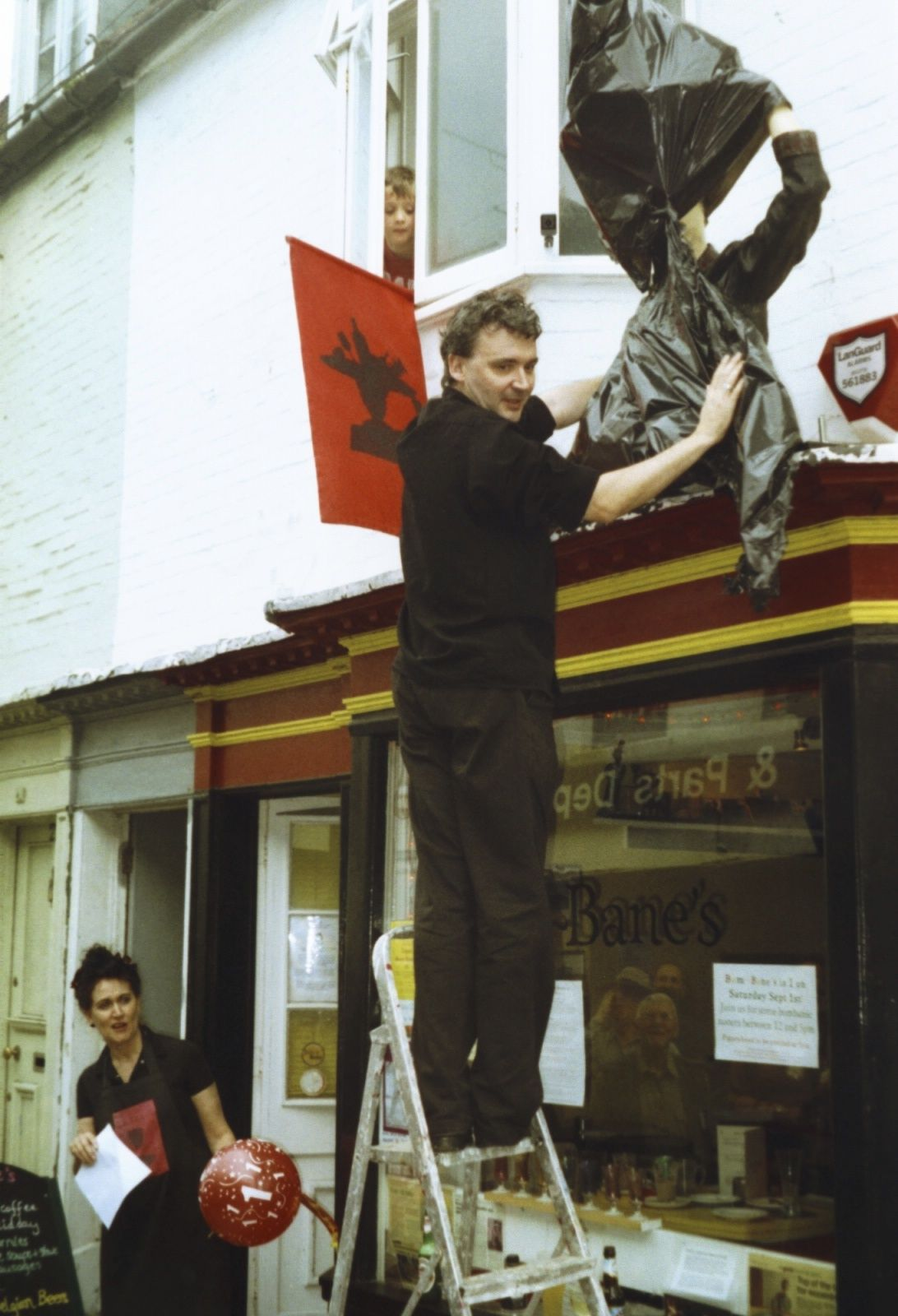
Nick Pynn unveils the statue on 1 September 2007, the café's first birthday. By the door is Jane Bom-Bane.

The small downstairs area is the main live venue, where past performers have included Nick Pynn, Kate Daisy Grant, Stewart Lee, Bridget Christie, Rich Hall, Mike Heron, Robin Williamson, Boothby Graffoe, Lorraine Bowen, Arthur Brown, Spacedog, George Egg, Joanna Neary, Foster and Gilvan, David Bramwell, Gilli Bloodaxe, Steve Hawley and Jerry Dammers. Each May, Jane Bom-Bane and her "Bom-Bane Family Players" perform a musical for the Brighton Fringe Festival that often takes place throughout the building.

Each table in the upstairs dining area has a 'mechanical secret.' One tabletop imperceptibly rises, another slowly revolves, and another contains a model of Brighton's Palace Pier, with working rides. Chimes ring out when customers lift the salt cellar on one table, and another has a screen showing 1920s black and white cartoons of Aesop's Fables. The tables were mainly built by Bom-Bane and her then partner, Nick Pynn. In 2007, she told the Guardian, "We stay up late and work together. I'll be busy painting and moulding the tiny parts, he'll be fixing a circuit."

On the wall outside, there was a statue of Bom-Bane, built by her brother-in-law, John Jostins, who worked on R2-D2 in The Empire Strikes Back. On the night of 1 December 2012, thieves stole the statue. Jane Bom-Bane told the Argus, "I feel like my alter ego has been snatched. It has no use or value to anyone else, but it is a part of us." With the theft unsolved, puppeteer Isobel Smith organised a collection from café regulars to raise money for a new statue. The second one, built by the artist Paul Harrison, was unveiled on 11 January 2015. Vandals attacked the replacement on 22 July 2017, stealing the statue's head and tray. The original statue was recovered, restored with a new tray, and replaced on the wall on 9 May 2021.

The café regularly shows films and also runs occasional courses on art, photography, cryptic crossword solving, film, baking, and singing. There is a children's homework club on Wednesday nights. "One of the charms of the venue," writes Daniel Agnew, "is how young children turn up to do their homework and are treated with the same respect as the musicians rehearsing in the Moroccan parlour downstairs. Indeed, the café possesses so many surrealist twists you would be forgiven for thinking the venue had originally been conceived in a dreamy child's mind."

== Jane Bom-Bane ==
Jane Bom-Bane was born Jane Bayley in Leek, Staffordshire. After moving to and growing up in Coventry, she became lead singer of the Swinging Cats, a Two-Tone band that released one single, "Mantovani." In the 90s, she went solo, playing the harmonium, singing her own songs, and wearing a selection of mechanical hats that "light up and turn and move in various ways." A typical hat takes the form of an animated goldfish bowl. World's Weirdest Restaurants presenter Bob Blumer described her hats as "part genius and part outsider art. What I love about the hats is that they are not highly polished, finely tuned specimens. They are more like little kinetic high school art projects that sit on your head."

The idea to open a café came to Bom-Bane while running a monthly musical event in Brighton with Nick Pynn. She told Brighton's Source magazine, "I thought, 'Wouldn't it be great to have your harmoniums and your hats in one place, and have a little venue downstairs, have a little café upstairs.' I thought originally it'd just be me and the café, and play a few songs every now and then. It just evolved into what it is now, which is involving lots of other people playing, cinema clubs and all manner of stuff going on."

The café opened on 1 September 2006. Interviewed on the opening's tenth anniversary, Bom-Bane recalled, "I'd never run an eatery before, so the first year of Bom-Bane's was a steep learning curve. It wasn't until the second year that I put the music part of the plan into action."

== Performances ==
=== Bom-Bane's the Musical ===
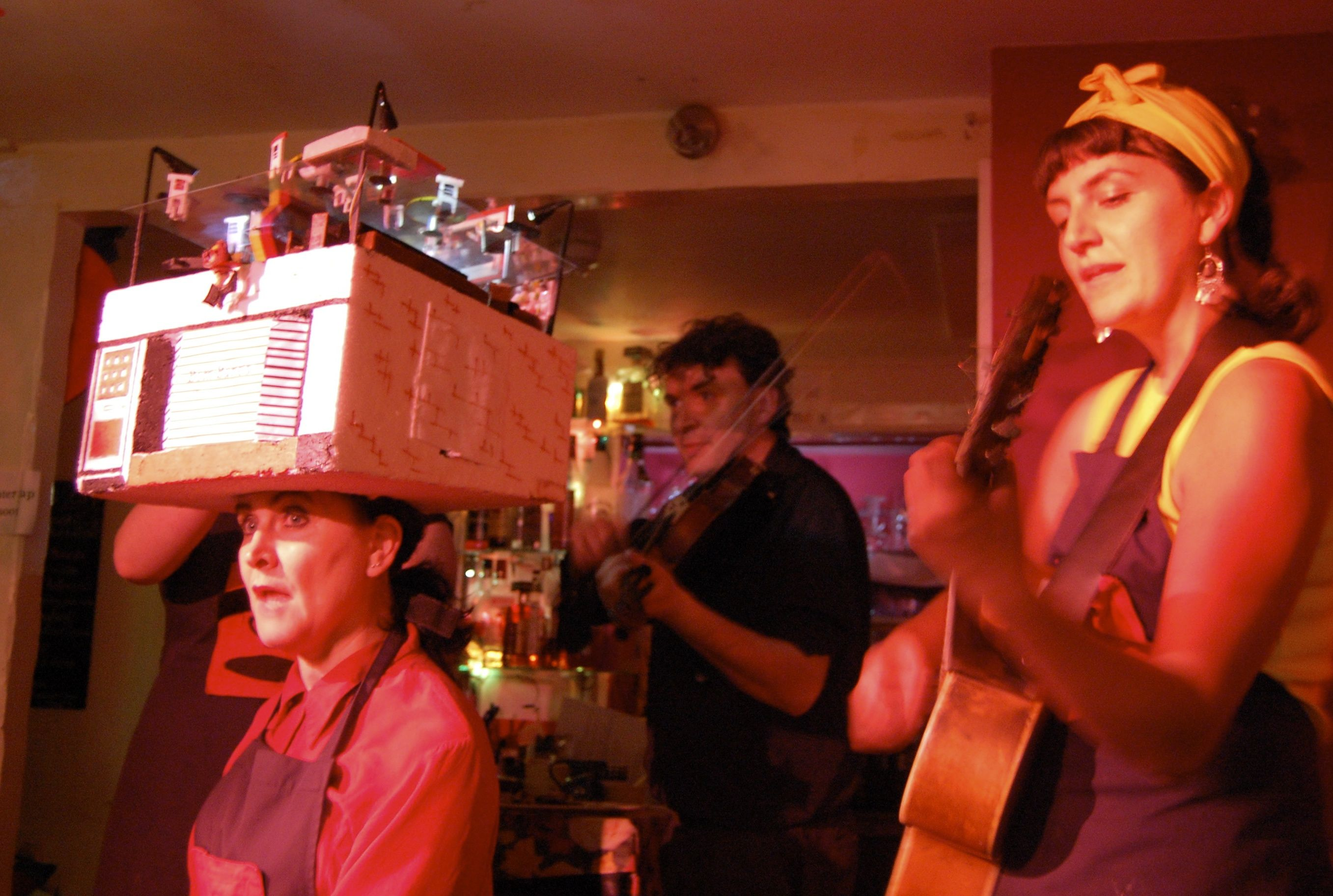
Jane Bom-Bane, Nick Pynn and Rosi Lalor perform 'Bom-Bane's the Musical', 30 May 2008

The tradition of employing 'singing staff'. began when Bom-Bane hired Rosi Lalor and Candy Hilton. Bom-Bane told Source magazine: quote "Bom-Bane's mark two, in terms of the people who worked here, involved a lovely girl called Rosi and her friend Candy. I just thought they were perfect for the place, but both turned out to have amazing voices and were really great at harmonising. I thought 'I've got to harness this!' And so, that became Bom-Bane's The Musical. I wrote all these songs about setting up Bom-Bane's, and the food, and everybody got involved"' Bom-Bane's the Musical, which included songs written by Lalor and Hilton, was first performed in the Brighton Fringe Festival in May 2008, and ran over the next two years.

Lalor has said it was while working at Bom-Bane's that she "learned how to hold her head up whilst singing her songs. Jane also taught her how to enunciate her lyrics properly so that people could understand what she was saying. ('Rosi, you've spent ages writing these beautiful words, people deserve to hear them!')"

=== A Musical History of 24 George Street ===
For her 2011 fringe show, Bom-Bane researched the history of the building, writing songs about its previous occupants. According to the Argus review, 'Over the course of an evening – and a three-course dinner – audience members are taken on a musical journey through time. The building's story is told simply through song, from 1795 when the house was built, through to the present day....The performers recount the stories of the many families who have lived there over the years, from musical instrument maker William Baker in the 1830s to bicycle dealer Mr Moreman in the 1950s.'

=== Jane Bom-Bane's House ===
In 2012, Bom-Bane first used the whole building as the setting for her fringe show. A small audience of four was led upstairs by Bom-Bane, singing a health and safety warning about the staircase, to the bathroom, 'where we were confronted by a beautiful tableau, accompanied with a song by the hostess. Next, the living room, where a rotating series of guest performers are made up of famous friends of Jane's doing wonderful and curious things. Then up another flight of steps to a display of Jane's infamous mechanical hats from previous productions, all impressively animated to a new musical number. Then up more stairs for a surprise performance in the attic, and finally to the master bedroom for a final song....Members of our party were audibly cooing and gasping at each new discovery, until we were, at last, led carefully back down the winding, narrow staircases into the restaurant for an all-you-can-eat-buffet....A magical end to a magical evening.'

=== 5 Down 20 Across ===
In May 2013, to celebrate the centenary of the crossword puzzle, Jane Bom-Bane created 5 Down 20 Across, which turned the building itself into a puzzle. Audience members were invited to solve this by collecting clues from all the doors in the building. Each door had a black-and-white painting by a different artist.

One of the doors, painted by Peter Chrisp, which told the story of the Franklin Expedition, can be seen on YouTube.

=== Merrily on High ===
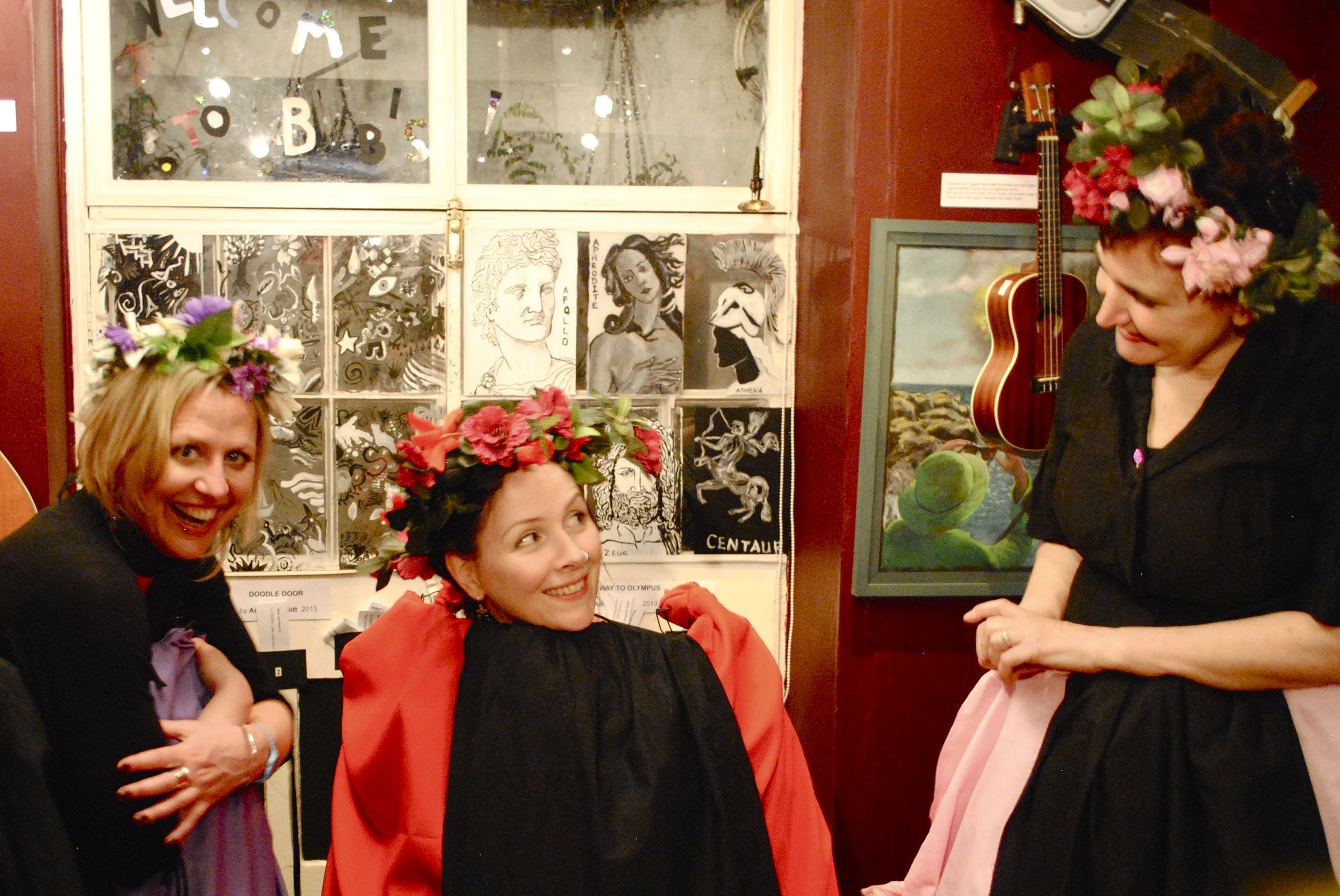
The Silver Swans (l-r: Emma Kilbey, Eliza Skelton and Jane Bom-Bane)

In 2013, Jane Bom-Bane wrote a Christmas musical, Merrily on High, which was performed throughout December. This featured puppetry by Daisy Jordan (Barely Human Puppets), with singing by the madrigal folk trio The Silver Swans, comprising Bom-Bane, Emma Kilbey and Eliza Skelton, who is also the café's chef.

Merrily on High was revived in December 2020, with the same performers apart from Emma Kilbey, replaced by Martin Peters. Daisy Jordan created new puppets for the revival.

=== The Long Lost River Song ===
Bom-Bane's 2014 May fringe show was inspired by Brighton's lost secret river, an intermittent stream called the Wellesbourne. Five audience members were invited to follow the river, as it flowed from its source in the attic to 'a sea-bound chorus in the cellar, followed by a feast of foods foraged en route.' Rachel Blackman described the show in Fringe Review: 'We are invited into her bedroom for one act and her bathroom for another. We trace the river through rooms in the house, all the way down to the restaurant level, gathering cast members as the river itself gathers momentum. Finally, we land in the restaurant area where we are fed a three-course meal of simple, delicious fare sourced locally.' For this show, the company comprised Jane Bom-Bane, Eliza Skelton, Foz Foster, Colin Uttley, Freya Bowyes, Martin Peters, Lynne Thomas, Sarah Angliss and Daisy Jordan.

=== Saippuakivikauppias ===
Bom-Bane's 2015 fringe show was called Saippuakivikauppias, which means 'The Soapstone Seller' in Finnish, and is also thought to the longest palindromic word. This was a second collaboration between Jane Bom-Bane and the puppeteer Daisy Jordan. The show dramatised a tale originally written, in verse, by Bom-Bane in 2002, the year of the Palindrome. The audience followed the Midgard Serpent down into the underbelly of the cafe, where 'the tale of a troubled craftsman driven and hampered by his compulsion to remain symmetrical was told through song, puppetry and animation.' The songs were sung by Bom-Bane, Martin Peters and Eliza Skelton. The performance was followed by a Finnish meal, created by André and Anna Schmidt, including mackerel pâté, Firewater (vodka and cranberry juice), meatballs (veggie meatball option included) and Mustikkapiirakka (blueberry pie).'An all-round sensory treat, this thoughtful existential fable effortlessly sucks the audience into its beautifully rendered world,' said Nick Aldwinckle in The Argus.

=== Bom-Banimals ===
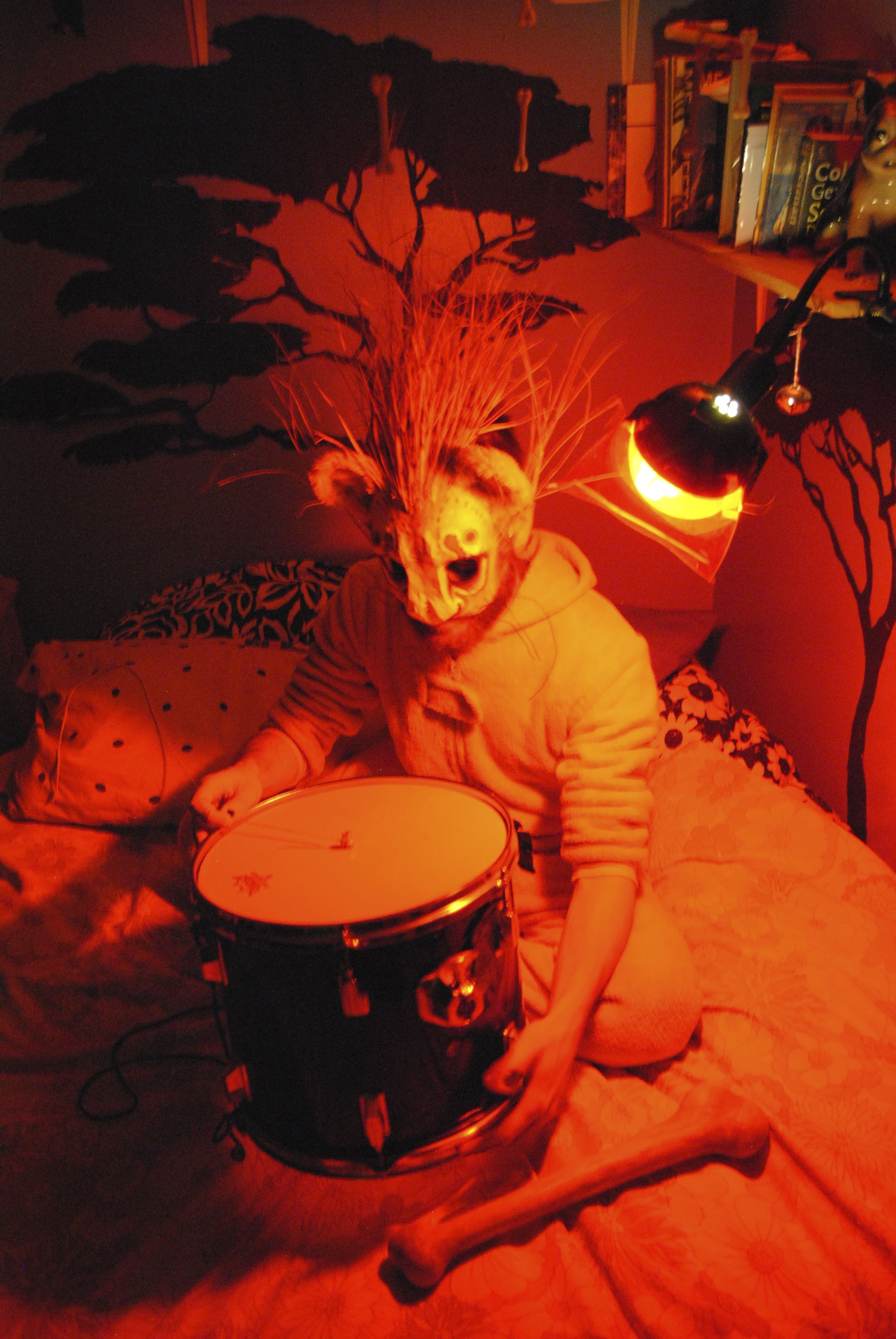
The lion in Bom-Banimals, the 2016 musical

Bom-Banimals, in May 2016, was an animal themed fantasia, again taking place throughout the building. An audience of six was invited to move from room to room, encountering a series of musical animals (Eliza Skelton, Foz Foster, Kate Daisy Grant, Raven Kaliana, Jo McDonagh, Sebas Contreras, Kate Vaughan, and Tom Walker). Rachel Blackman described the experience in Fringe Review: 'We barely manage to squeeze into each of the modest spaces with the performers who gradually accumulate and eventually outnumber us. In each room we meet a different animal, all of whom must sacrifice a beloved item in order to find their authentic voice....if there is a message to be had, it is a light one, but touches on the notion that if we love someone, giving a piece of ourselves is a risk, but can pay off one hundredfold....And a plea maybe for the ongoing existence of this kind of intimate, real time, unrepeatable experience, where the value to each of us is so much more rich, raw and indescribable than the price of a ticket.' The show was also reviewed in Total Theatre and received five stars from the Argus.

=== Snow White and the Seven Sisters ===
For Christmas 2018, Jane Bom-Bane, with Eliza Skelton, wrote a folk musical, Snow White and the Seven Sisters. This combined the traditional fairy tale with stories of seven sisters, including the constellation, the waterfall in Norway and the chalk cliffs in Sussex. Keeping the theme of seven, the songs were in seven time. Eliza Skelton played Snow White, Jane Bom-Bane was the witch, and the rest of the cast comprised Daisy Jordan, Becca Dyer, Kate Daisy Grant and Martin Peters.
