= Oddfellows Casino =

English band

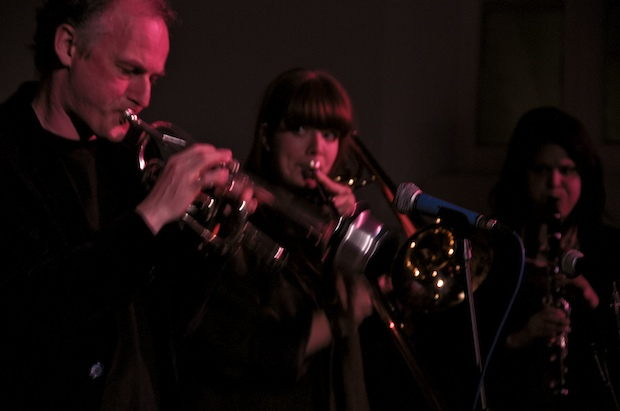
Oddfellows Casino (2010)

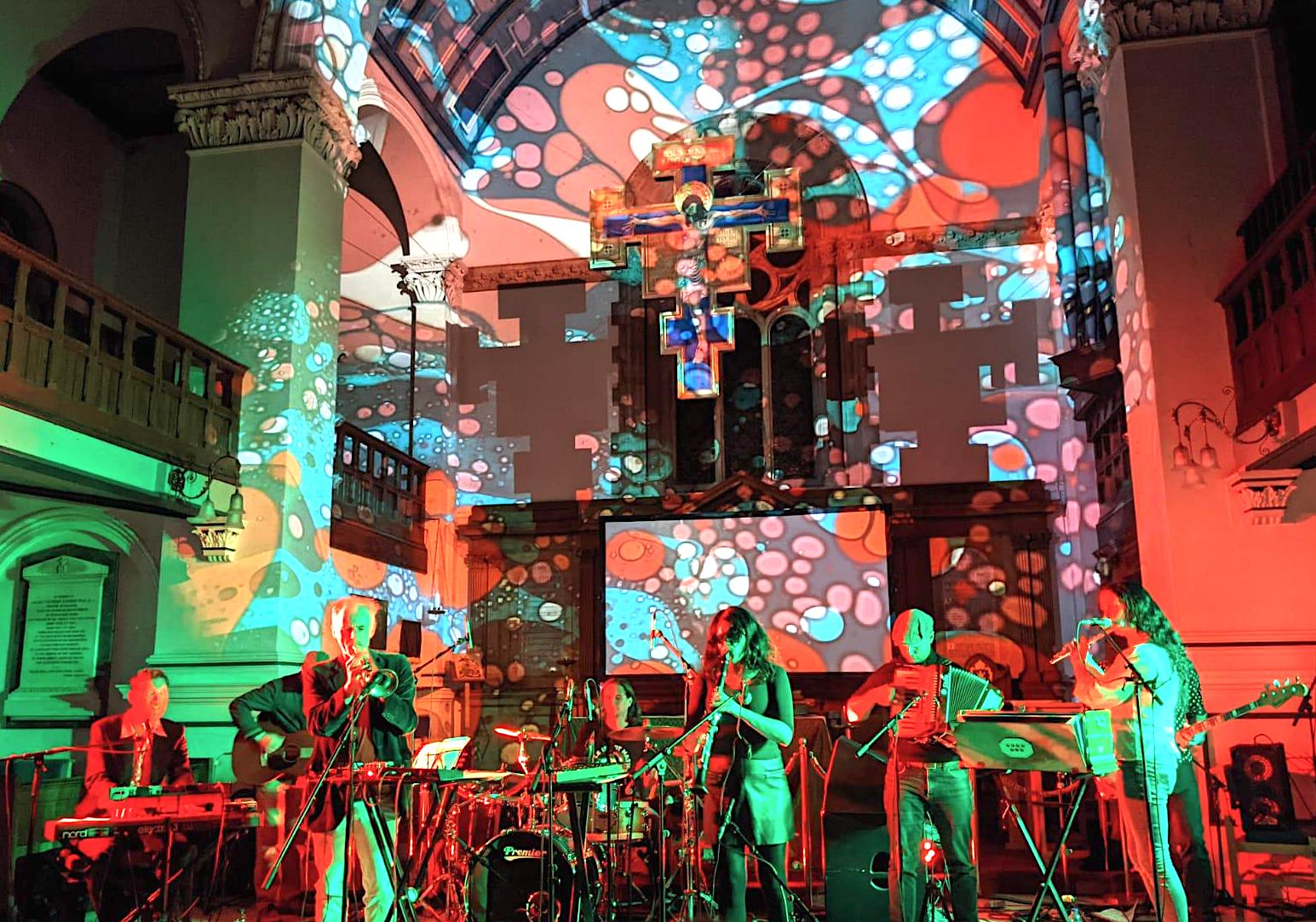
Oddfellow's Casino live at St George's Church, Brighton Sept 30th 2021

Oddfellows Casino are an English band based in Brighton. At the helm is singer-songwriter David Bramwell plus an ensemble of long-serving band members and occasional collaborators including Fujiya & Miyagi’s Steve Lewis, former Stereolab bassist Simon John’s and Grasscut’s Andrew Phillips.

== Early history ==
In the mid-1990s, Bramwell recorded his first album with the band Luminous, produced and released by Shimmy Disc's producer Kramer, before going solo in 2000 and forming Oddfellows Casino. Early releases on Leicester’s Pickled Egg Records included Yellow-Bellied Wonderland and Winter Creatures, drawing comparisons with Robert Wyatt, The Beta Band, Red House Painters and late-period Talk Talk. For the band's third album, 2012's The Raven's Empire, Bramwell teamed up with producer and composer Andrew Phillips to create a record that was altogether bigger, darker and more orchestrated than what had come before. Reviews acknowledged a change in direction citing 'bubbling synths and ornate productions.' (Happening Magazine) and 'occult incantation' (Drowned in Sound). The single, "Winter in a Strange Town", was picked up by BBC 6Music’s Gideon Coe, Lauren Laverne and Cerys Matthews.

== Later history ==
By the late 2000s, Bramwell was also becoming established as an author and radio presenter, making programmes for BBC Radio 3 and BBC Radio 4, and specialising in the weird and bizarre.

In 2014, Oddfellows Casino released their fourth studio album, The Water Between Us, followed by a collection of unreleased material, Dust, through At the Helm Records and France's Microcultures. In 2017, their sixth album, Oh, Sealand, included the voice of comic book author Alan Moore, a song written to accompany the book Watling Street by author John Higgs, and an unofficial national anthem for the independent principality of Sealand, in the North Sea. It received positive reviews, making fourth place in the top ten best albums of 2017 in Switzerland's LeTemps newspaper.

The International Times described Oh, Sealand as a ‘mixtures of ghostly folk and eerily urgent song craft..' The Quietus’s Ben Graham described Oh, Sealand as ‘joining the dots between Pentangle and The Pet Shop Boys, Basil Kirchin and British Sea Power.

In 2020, Oddfellows Casino marked their 20th anniversary with the release of three albums over 12 months: a new album of songs, Burning! Burning!; an album and booklet of spoken word and music based on Bramwell's solo show, The Cult of Water, in collaboration with Alan Moore, Rough Trade Books and illustrator Pete Fowler, and Music from the Cult of Water.

== Discography ==
- Yellow Bellied Wonderland (Pickled Egg Records, (2002)
- Winter Creatures (Pickled Egg Records, 2005)
- The Absence of Birds (Pickled Egg Records, (2008)
- The Raven's Empire (Nightjar Records, 2012)
- The Water Between Us (At the Helm Records, Microcultures 2012)
- Dust (At the Helm Records, (Microcultures, 2015)
- Oh, Sealand (At the Helm Records, Microcultures 2017)
- Burning! Burning! (Nightjar Records, 2020)
- The Cult of Water (Nightjar Records, 2021)
- Music from The Cult of Water (Nightjar Records, 2021)
- Prince of the Starry Wheel (Nightjar Records, 2022)
