= Paintbox =

Paintbox may refer to:

- Paintbox (software), a graphics utility for the ZX Spectrum, released in 1983
- Quantel Paintbox, a computer graphics workstation for television video and graphics, released in 1981
- "Paint Box", a 1967 song by Pink Floyd
- PaintBox, a program operated by the Boston Art Commission, Massachusetts, US
