= OWK =

Owk or OWK may refer to:

- Owk, a mandal in Andhra Pradesh, India
- Otto Wille Kuusinen, Finnish, later Soviet, politician
- Other World Kingdom, a BDSM facility and micronation located within the Czech Republic
- Obi-Wan Kenobi
