= Afterplanesman =

Studio album by Nick Pynn
- Released: May 2004
- Genres: Contemporary folk; avant-folk; experimental
- Length: 37:03
- Label: Roundhill Music
- Producer: Nick Pynn

Nick Pynn chronology
Music from Windows (1999)	Afterplanesman (2004)	The Colours of the Night (2009)

Afterplanesman is the third solo studio album by British avant-folk musician Nick Pynn, originally released in May 2004 by Roundhill Music, and re-released in November 2008. Recorded after Pynn helped restore submarines in a Portsmouth naval museum, where he discovered the job that an "afterplanesman" is given on board a submarine, Pynn "saw his position" and named the album accordingly. Playing most of its instruments on the album, Pynn also collaborated with Tom Arnold, and a total of eighteen musical instruments feature on the album, including traditional folk and experimental instruments.

The tracks on the album are said to form a "suite-like movement;" several of the tracks on the album use abstract structures, and sampled voices are occasionally used to emulate melody and deliver deadpan poetry, accompanying the music's ethereal sounds. Surreal sound effects such as playing cards also feature on the album. Afterplanesman was released to critical acclaim, with critics finding the album to be a successful experiment. The Sunday Times included the reissue on their list of the 100 best albums of 2008, and Stewart Lee included the album on a list of his thirteen favourite albums of all time.

== Background ==
After beginning his career in the mid-1980s, Nick Pynn became known in the 1990s for his "avant-folk" music and usage of musical instruments he created himself, recording the albums In Mirrored Sky (1995) and Music for Windows (1999) for Roundhill Music, which were subsequently re-released as a double album in 2007. He also recorded collaboration albums with Richard Durrant in 1997 and Jane Bom-Bane in 2002, and began performing in "pick up bands" for stand up comedians such as Rich Hall and Stewart Lee, the latter of whom, when speaking about Afterplanesman, commented: "He's got all these different instruments that he's made himself, and dulcimers that he's salvaged, and things like a coconut that he's strung and he puts them all through loops and makes this music that's like folk music but too arty."

In 2003, Pynn got a job helping to restore submarines in a Portsmouth naval museum, where he discovered that an "afterplanesman" who "the man who sits and keeps the [submarine] balanced by looking at the bubble in the spirit level." This was when Pynn decided to create Afterplanesman. Lee commented that he thought Pynn "saw his position" as the afterplanesman. Pynn premiered a solo show in 2003 called Music from Hotels Rooms, Forests and Submarines, in which Pynn, playing household objects as musical instruments including playing cards, wine glasses, and live sampling, in addition to his various stringed instruments; the show formed the template of his concept for Afterplanesman, and used many of the same instruments and music.

== Musical style ==
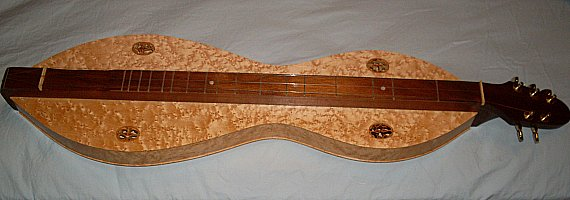
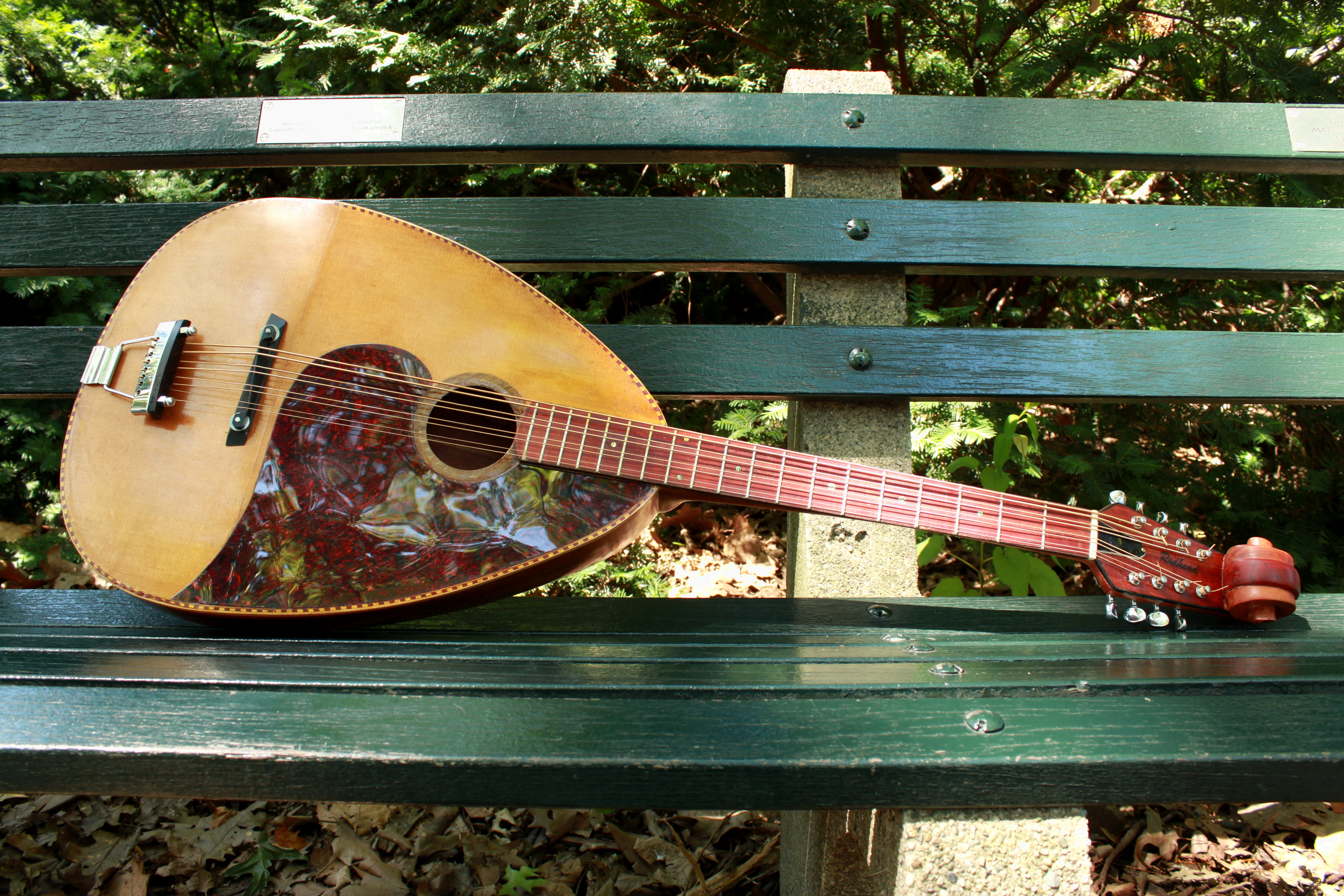
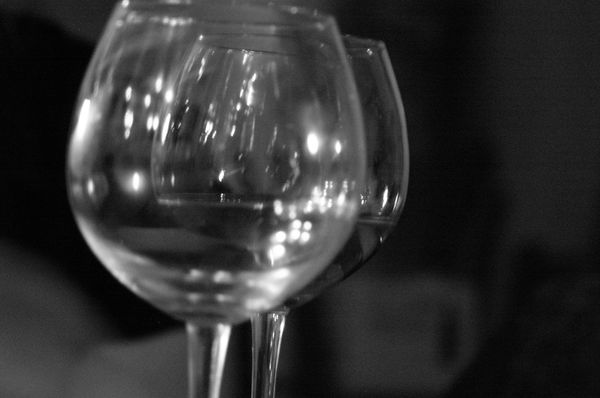
Instruments played by Nick Pynn include the lap dulcimer, mandocello and wine glasses.

Afterplanesman is experimental and largely instrumental; few of its songs feature singing, and vocals are generally used for effect, such as with "Joker Jack", an example of several songs on the album which use "the patter of everyday speech to create something close to a melody." Pynn's own vocals, which feature on "Grace", are spoken word and spoken in a "dreamlike deadpan" that complemented the accompanying ethereal sounds. Several songs on the album have no song structure at all, an example being "Nocturne," an eerie, atmospheric song. Sarah Meador of Rambles has nonetheless conceded that "always there is poetry, and some interaction of voice and music that carries a piece beyond spoken word." The music on the album is said to be "haunting rather than catchy" and each track is said to work cohesively within the album "like movements in a suite." One critic described the music on the album as "art folk."

Eighteen musical instruments were used on Afterplanesman, mostly played by Pynn but several by collaborator Tom Arnold. Indeed, Musician magazine noted: "There are certainly surprises in store: violins, poetry, acoustic guitar and playing card sound effects on the surreal 'Joker Jack'." The Sunday Times noted the album's usage of self made instruments and sampled vocals which "range across cultural, geographical and temporal boundaries." Pynn himself plays the acoustic and electric guitar, 10-string bouzouki, lap dulcimer, wine glasses, oud, violin, mandocello, theremin, mandolin and pedalboard on the album. "Heriot Row" works its way through minor and diminished chords before reaching "a happy-sounding conclusion." The eerie "Nocturne" makes use of only a theremin and vocals.

== Release and reception ==
Afterplanesman was originally released on Roundhill Music in May 2004, but was re-released on 10 November 2008, and received critical acclaim. Describing the album as "a daring experiment, and a successful one," Sarah Meador of Rambles was favourable, saying "Afterplanesman is less an album than a tour of strange places, exotic landscapes grown with sound and populated with voices on the edge of familiarity. It's an enchanting trip, and won't use up your vacation time." She felt the album was "much different than a standard music recording." Musician magazine "highly recommended" Afterplanesman, calling the album "richly varied and wonderfully played with an intriguingly elusive style" and noting that "production companies should sit up and take note - this would sound very good indeed on films and programmes."

The 2008 reissue of the album featured on The Sunday Times' list of "The 100 Best Records of 2008." The newspaper said: "Pynn gave his micro-suite of miniature art-folk curios a push this year. Sampled vocals and self-made instruments range across cultural, geographical and temporal boundaries to delightful effect." In a 2011 list curated for The Quietus, comedian Stewart Lee, whom Pynn has worked with, included Afterplanesman in a list of "His 13 Favourite Albums." Describing the album as bearing a "polite dignity," and commenting that its both his and his wife Bridget Christie's favourite Pynn album, he commented that the music was hard to categorize: "It's like something that might be in the Wire except it's a bit too melodic, it's sort of like singer/songwriter stuff but there's no words. It's sort of a bit like John Cage or something, except that there's too many tunes. It doesn't basically fit any model."

== Track listing ==
1. "Feu de Joie" – 1:47
2. "Afterplanesman" – 2:36
3. "Badtooth" – 3:02
4. "For Jane Bom-Bane" – 1:58
5. "Joker Jack" – 3:13
6. "Heriot Row" – 5:48
7. "Dancer" – 0:34
8. "Champs Elysees" – 3:04
9. "Off Nicolson Street" – 2:37
10. "Grace" – 1:30
11. "The Brightest Star" – 2:16
12. "From a Yellow Room" – 2:56
13. "Nocturne" – 3:10
14. "Goodbye Dearest Friend" – 2:29

== Personnel ==
- Tom Arnold – accordion (track 8), drums (track 3), Hammond organ (track 3), percussion (tracks 1, 8)
- Nick Pynn – acoustic guitar (tracks 7, 8, 11, 12, 14), 10-string bouzouki (track 5), lap dulcimer (tracks 4, 10), guitar (tracks 1, 3–5), wine glasses (track 2), mandocello (track 6), violin (tracks 1, 3, 5, 9, 10), oud (track 10), bass pedalboard (tracks 1, 2, 4, 6–9), playing cards sounds (track 5), theremin (track 13), voice (track 10)
- Olly Blanchflower – double bass (track 8)
- Jane Born-Bane – harmonium (track 9)
- Christian Reilly – poker voice (track 5)
- Damian Coldwell – poker voice (track 5)
- Rich Hall – poker voice (track 5)
