= Alistair Fruish =

English filmmaker and writer

Alistair Fruish is an English filmmaker, writer and novelist, born in Northampton.

== Work ==
Fruish is known for his novel Kiss My ASBO. Along with a number of other short stories by the writer, the initial section of Kiss My ASBO, "Double Bubble", was first published in Philosophy Now. On its release the book was highly praised by British working-class writers Alan Moore, Russ Litten and Alex Wheatle, with Courttia Newland describing it as "completely original". Writer and editor Steve Moore called the book "a masterpiece". During a Prison Reading Groups supported visit to maximum-security prison HMP Full Sutton to discuss the book with prisoners, Fruish referred to the book's genre as "grime fiction", with prisoners celebrating the colloquial language and lyrical experience of reading the book. Kiss My ASBO is one of the books that have been banned from Guantanamo Bay.

Fruish is also author of a 46,000-word single-sentence work that is entirely monosyllabic, called The Sentence, which has been staged around Britain, and is performed in non-stop group readings orchestrated by the director Daisy Campbell. These performances began in February 2017 at The Cockpit in London and ended in March 2018 at the British Library. Readers have included Alan Moore, Robin Ince, Jeff Young, Alan Cox, Sean McCann, Frances Thorburn and Gavin Mitchell. The Sentence is highly unusual in that it is not officially published, but has been performed in its entirety as part of a nationwide tour. John Higgs said of the piece: "It is tempting to see The Sentence as the spirit of all books raising their game now that virtual reality threatens to take their place as our most vivid art form."

Since 2001, Fruish has worked in more than 40 prisons as a writer-in-residence. Since starting out at HMP Wellingborough he has worked as a writer in nearly every category and type of English prison, in both the public and private sectors and both male and female estate. With HMP Full Sutton's writer-in-residence Gerry Ryan, he initiated the first ever writer-led arts project at the Military Corrective Training Centre (MCTC) military prison in Colchester. As of 2015, he was based in HMP Leicester, where he worked closely with Senior Community Librarian Louise Dowell. He has collaborated with a number of other artists on prison arts projects including Dr Bruce Wall of the London Shakespeare Workout and poet John Row. Fruish is dyslexic and was drawn to work with prisoners because of the large levels of literacy problems found among the prison population. In Prison a Survival Guide, Carl Cattermole, states, "I've personally come across some of the best teachers in my life through prison - educators like Alistair Fruish are prime examples." In a report by the House of Commons Business, Innovation and Skills Committee, on adult literacy and numeracy, Fruish is quoted as saying, "sadly, there are only a handful of writers-in-residence remaining working in prisons. Much of the expertise that has been built up over the last two decades is in danger of being lost". As a response to the pandemic Fruish edited three TOOLBOX books and made them available to prisons in the UK. Inside Time described them as, "full of high-quality creative games, life enhancing exercise techniques and personal development tips for all ages and abilities. The books have many contributions from scores of writers, scientists and artists".

Along with Steve Moore, John Higgs and Donna Bond he is one of the four editors of Alan Moore's Jerusalem. Moore credits Fruish's research with providing vital information that allowed him to finish the novel. In an interview with his biographer, Lance Parkin, Moore states that he has few hobbies, but he likes to go for walks with Fruish, whom he met when Fruish invited Moore back to visit the school he was expelled from. Moore recounts how he and Fruish were ejected from Easton Neston Hall while walking around it in From Hell. Fruish also took Moore in to HMP Wellingborough to meet prisoners.

In the mid-1980s, while still at school, Fruish edited a magazine called Tripping Yarns. Issue two appeared in 1988 and contained an interview with Kathy Acker conducted by Alan Moore, as well as an interview and retrospective with underground comic artist Edwin Pouncey a.k.a. Savage Pencil, who also provided the cover. The magazine included an interview with publisher Tony Bennet, as well as interviews with the bands Killdozer and the Butthole Surfers.

In the late 1980s, Fruish worked for independent record company Blast First. During this time he toured with the band Dinosaur Jr.

Fruish played the role of William Burroughs in Daisy Eris Campbell's theatrical adaptation and production Cosmic Trigger at The Cockpit theatre in May 2017. He also created two podcasts to accompany this production. The first is a conversation with Erik Davis, the second, In the Sphere Of The Mind, voiced by Oliver Senton as Robert Anton Wilson, and Kate Alderton as Arlen Riley Wilson, a poetic take on John Lilly's Beliefs Unlimited. Fruish had previously given a talk entitled "R.A.W on the Inside" at the Daisy Eris curated festival Find The Others, that accompanied the original performance of Cosmic Trigger in Liverpool in 2014.

Fruish appears, is credited, thanked or acknowledged in a number of books and publications including: Yvvette Edwards' The Mother, Andrew O'Neill's History of Heavy Metal, John Higgs Watling Street, Deborah Delano's Saddest Sound, and A. William James Book Thirteen, which is in part dedicated to Fruish.

He rides a rowbike.

Fruish is a member of the Northampton Arts Lab.
