= David Bramwell =

British writer, musician, performer and broadcaster

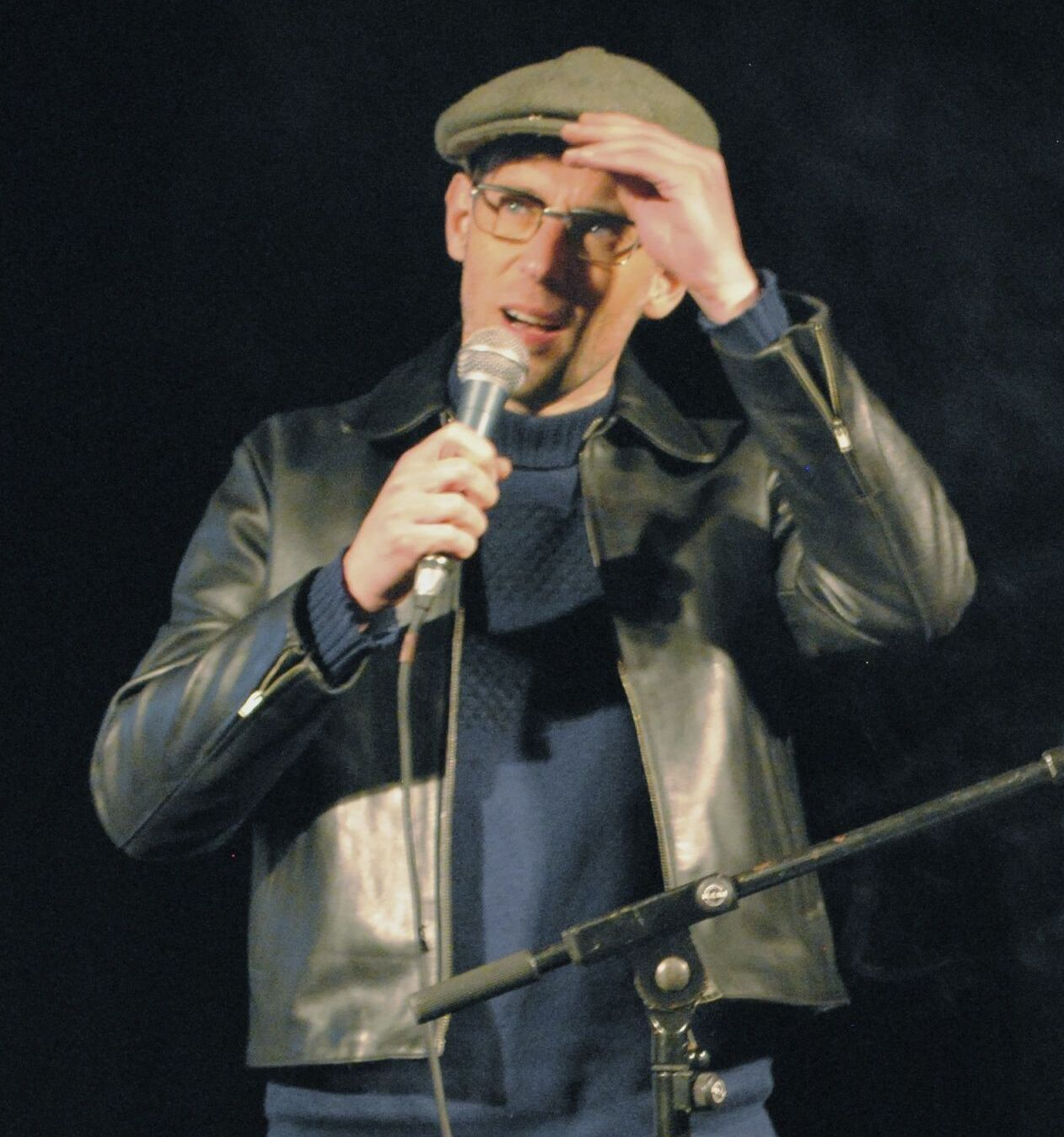
Bramwell in 2015

David Bramwell is a British writer, musician, performer and broadcaster. For BBC Radio 3 and Radio 4, he has made programmes on diverse subjects, including Ivor Cutler, clapping, time travel, and the murmurations of starlings. He is the founder and host of Brighton's spoken word night, the Catalyst Club. Bramwell is also a singer-songwriter with his band Oddfellow's Casino. Describing Bramwell's writing, Matthew Clayton declares that 'The tradition that he taps into is one best exemplified by the work of Ken Campbell — or from another perspective he is one part Eric Morecambe, one part Alan Moore.’

Bramwell was born in Scunthorpe, moving to Doncaster at the age of six, where he lived until he was eighteen. After 'four long years studying geography' at Coventry Polytechnic, he moved to Brighton in the early 1990s. He describes the impact of Brighton in his book, The Haunted Moustache: 'For a northern boy in his early twenties and still wet behind the ears Brighton was overwhelming. I'd stumbled on an exotic seaside town that welcomed me with open arms....To top it off, Brighton was almost comically eccentric.' Much of Bramwell's work documents and celebrates the eccentricity of the seaside city, as he strives 'to keep the spirit of Brighton alive and through his work across a multitude of platforms.'

== Oddfellows Casino ==
Bramwell is a singer-songwriter, whose band, Oddfellows Casino, has released eleven albums since 2002. The band has been described as 'an outlet for Bramwell to explore his more macabre and supernatural interests rather that the outright bizarre.' Reviewing the second album, Winter Creatures, Everett True said that Bramwell's music was 'firmly out of sync with current trends, being instead a delicate pastoral exploration of the countryside, coloured with brass and sweet vocals reminiscent of Soft Machine-era Robert Wyatt. Notes linger. Tunes ache. Lyrics tease, like a cornucopia of found sound and jumble sale psychedelia.'

== The Catalyst Club ==
In 2004, Bramwell founded the Catalyst Club, a monthly spoken word event 'celebrating the singular passions of everyday folk'. The Catalyst takes place on the second Thursday of every month at Brighton's LatestMusic Bar. It usually comprises three 15-minute talks by guest speakers, each followed by a discussion. Past talk subjects include Having No Sense of Smell, Marmite, The History of the Martini, Demonology for Dummies, Slime Mould, The Eating Habits of Politicians and The Ontological Argument for God The club has a fortnightly podcast, called the Odditorium. Bramwell also hosts live Odditorium events at festivals, including Brighton Fringe Festival, Port Eliot Festival, the Secret Garden Party and Wilderness Festival.

== Cheeky Guides ==
Bramwell is the founder of Cheeky Guides Ltd, writing and publishing guide books which celebrate 'everything unusual, entertaining and saucy that a town has to offer, from how to attend a séance, places to spot local celebrities, where to get egg and chips at four in the morning, and the best place to buy fetish underwear'. The most popular is the Cheeky Guide to Brighton, which has gone through six editions since its first appearance in 1999. A typical entry in the 'What's On' section claims that, on 28 December, Brightonians celebrate Poseidon's Day: 'Once a year, 23 Brighton councillors gather on the nudist beach to offer blessings and sacrifices to the venerable sea god. Hosted by Simon Fanshawe the dancing, nudity and orgies go on into the small hours, weather permitting.'

Adam Trimingham, reviewing the fourth edition of The Cheeky Guide to Brighton in The Argus found it to be generally well-informed, but complained that 'after 300 pages, the relentless facetiousness is grating... The guide is nothing if not biased. The authors seem to have it in for Hove, traffic wardens and David Van Day, all of whom have their supporters... But the Cheeky Guide does reach corners this paper does not and probably doesn't want to reach... It's best taken, like sherry and many soft drugs, in small doses, or probably not at all.'

== Stage shows ==
=== The Haunted Moustache ===
For the 2008 Brighton Fringe Festival, Bramwell created The Haunted Moustache, a one-man stage show in the storytelling tradition of Ken Campbell and Spalding Gray. It was directed by Nicola Haydn, who described it as "an affectionate tale of old Brighton from someone who was really there." Paul Levy, writing in Fringe Review, described The Haunted Moustache as "a piece of writing genius and a performance that doesn't always sit comfortably as either theatre or storytelling. However, it still manages to hold the audience in thrall."

In 2011, The Haunted Moustache was dramatised for Radio 3's Between the Ears. It won a Sony Silver Award for best feature, and was followed by further Bramwell programmes, all produced by Sara Jane Hall. She described the making of The Haunted Moustache on a BBC blog: "When David Bramwell, presenter of The Haunted Moustache, first pulled out a box containing an unlikely inheritance – a small waxed moustache – I decided not to ask if it was real, or how much of his tale was true. Remarkably neither did anyone else. It was a game between us – don't ask, don't tell – and the final programme was a riddle for the listener – soothed by David's haunting music."

In 2016, Bramwell published The Haunted Moustache as a book, "part memoir, essay and scrapbook (which) pays tribute to some of the town's countercultural heroes, past and present." Laura Lockington reviewed the book in the Brighton and Hove Independent: "Bramwell takes us on a roller coaster ride of discovery, from deep Doncaster, to outlandish Brighton in the 1990s....I expected this book to be funny (and it is) and full of quirky stories and facts (it really, really is) but I hadn't expected to feel the full ache of nostalgia for a city that has all but disappeared."

A film version of The Haunted Moustache, directed by Stewart Armstrong, was released in 2025. It had its premiere at the Brighton Cinecity Festival in November.

=== Sing-Along-a-Wickerman ===
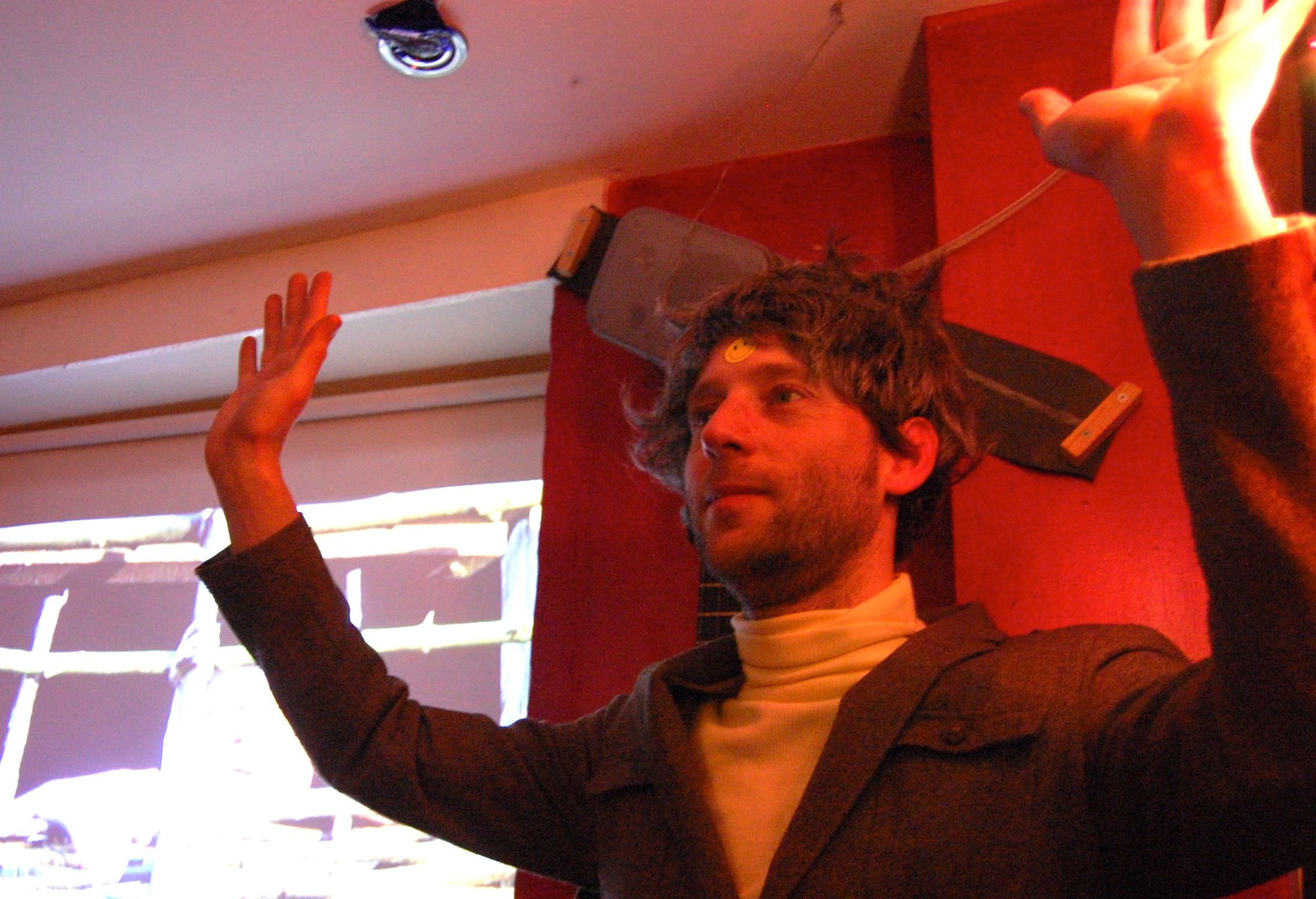
David Bramwell performs in "Sing-Along-a-Wickerman!" at Bom-Bane's in 2010

In 2008, Bramwell and the singer Eliza Skelton created Sing Along a Wickerman, an interactive showing of the cult 1973 horror film, The Wicker Man. Audience members, invited to dress in character, are given a 'Pagan Hymn Book', which allows them to join in all the songs from the film. The show was originally performed in 2008 at Bom-Bane's in Brighton, and has since toured festivals and theatres across the UK. Sing-Along-a-Wickerman won the approval of the film's director, Robin Hardy, who took part in several shows.

=== The Number 9 Bus to Utopia ===
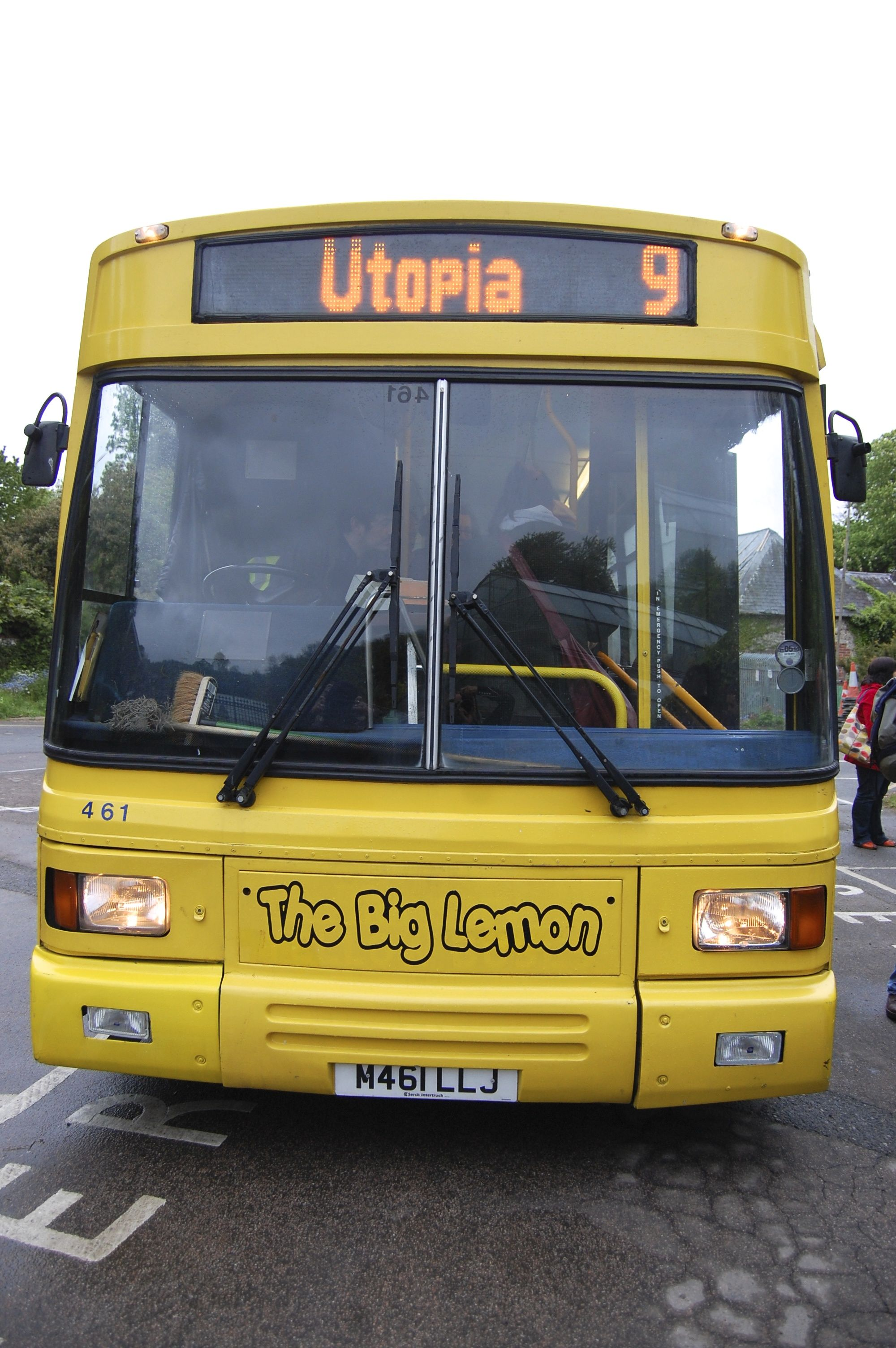
The Big Lemon bus which transported the audience for the No 9 Bus to Utopia show

Bramwell took a sabbatical from his teaching job in 2008 to investigate utopian communities, including Findhorn, Esalen, Freetown Christiania, Damanhur and The Other World Kingdom. The journey led to his second one-man stage show, The Number 9 Bus to Utopia, which was directed by Emma Kilbey and first performed during the Brighton Fringe in May 2009. Audience members were driven to the venue, the Earthship in Stanmer Park, in the Big Lemon bus, which is fuelled by recycled chip fat. The show won the 2009 Brighton Fringe award for Best Comedy. Bramwell also performed a short version as a TED talk and in 2013 made a Radio 3 programme about the Damanhur community called 'Time Travelling in Italy – Finding My Religion' He has also retold the story in five short films posted on YouTube.

In 2014, Bramwell published The Number 9 Bus to Utopia as a book, using crowdfunding through Unbound. Reviewer Ben McCormick wrote, "Through the pages, as you accompany the author on his journey...you feel like you're meeting a wealth of strange and familiar folk who in one way or another are just as lost, uncertain, bewildered and ultimately seeking some kind of answer as we undoubtedly all are."

In 2017, Bramwell turned the story into a radio comedy drama series, available as a podcast. The performers were Bramwell, David Mounfield, Emma Kilbey and Graham Duff.

== Zocalo ==
The investigation of utopian communities inspired Bramwell to promote Zocalo, an annual event, first held in 2006, in which Brighton people were encouraged to turn off their televisions, and take chairs onto their streets to get to know their neighbours. Bramwell told The Argus, "Nobody talks to their neighbours any more, most of us live in these towns and cities and we feel isolated....(Zocalo) is a way of getting communities bonding and to get people just talking to each other."

== The Odditorium, The Mysterium and The Oddyseum ==
In 2016-18, Bramwell collaborated with Jo Tinsley (later Keeling), editor of The Ernest journal, to produce three books. The first, in 2016, was The Odditorium: The tricksters, eccentrics, deviants and inventors whose obsessions changed the world. According to the Ernest journal website, the book is 'a playful re-telling of history told not through the fish eye lens of its victors but through the fascinating stories of lesser-known creative mavericks.' It was followed in 2017 with The Mysterium: Unexplained and extraordinary stories for a post-Nessie generation and The Odysseum: Strange journeys that obliterated convention, published in 2018.

== The Cult of Water ==
In 2009, Bramwell began to research the Cult of Water, based around a psychogeographical journey along the River Don. In an interview in 2019, he described how the project grew out of his own fear of water: 'I’ve wrestled all my life with thalassophobia – the fear of large bodies of water – and wanted to confront this fear. In the last ten years I went down a rabbit hole researching water cults, sacred springs and wells. I wanted to pay my respect to water. I also became interested in the idea of following a river back to its source. I knew if I was going to make this journey as a pilgrimage it'd have to be along the river Don where I grew up, to search for its lost water goddess and to trace its biological and metaphorical death and resurrection over the millennia. When I discovered that Sheffield adopted Vulcan – the Roman god of fire and forge – as its mascot in the 1800s, the story began to catalyse as a mythic battle of the sexes: goddess of water vs god of fire.'

This led first to Danu - Dead Flows the Don, a 2017 radio programme produced by Sarah Jane Hall for Radio 3's experimental series, Between the Ears. The programme included the sounds of the Don, recorded with hydrophones, Bramwell's own compositions, along with interviews with Alan Moore, discussing hydromancy, the folklorist David Clarke, John Heaps, a Sheffield steelworker who recalls throwing cyanide into the river in the 1970s, and two witches, Anwen and Lynne Harling, reviving recognition for the goddess of the river.

Bramwell then expanded this material to produce a stage show, The Cult of Water, which he premiered at Brighton Festival in 2018. The story now included a childhood memory of a family visit to Ladybower Reservoir, during the drought of 1976, when the eight-year-old Bramwell saw a ghostly church spire rising from the water. The memory was described by Mathew Clayton in Caught by the River: 'Bramwell, watching from the family's Hillman Hunter, describes it as a ‘drowning god coming up for air'. It symbolises Bramwell's world view perfectly — one where the conventional (a family day out in the Hillman Hunter) exists happily side-by-side with the unconventional (Excalibur!).' The show, performed by candlelight, mixed 'music, archive film, narration, ritual and animation.' Bramwell then toured the show, taking it to Sheffield, Doncaster, Liverpool, London and various festivals. Each performance concluded with a Q&A focusing on the stories and history of the local river. So, in Liverpool, Bramwell was joined by the poet Eleanor Rees talking about the folklore surrounding the River Mersey. In London, the folklorist Chris Roberts talked about the capital's lost rivers.

In 2021, Bramwell released Oddfellow's Casino's album, The Cult of Water, to accompany the project and also mark the band's 20th anniversary. This was described by Norman Miller in Bearded Magazine as a 'grand rag-bag of wonderment': 'Six years in the making, it augmented pastoral electronica with spoken word and field recordings to create a unique meditation on northern English landscape, inspired by the path of the River Don....With vocal contributions from Alan Moore, the album touched on topics as diverse as environmentalism and the occult, plus the sort of whimsy loved by fans of someone like Ivor Cutler.' The band later released an instrumental version of the album, Music from the Cult of Water, its tracks now 'cast as a seamless, shimmering flow of sounds, like the fluid river that provides its source inspiration.'

The album was accompanied by a booklet, illustrated by Pete Fowler, published by Rough Trade books in collaboration with the Museum of Witchcraft and Magic.

== Oddfellow's Casino discography ==
- Yellow Bellied Wonderland, Pickled Egg Records, 2002
- Winter Creatures, Pickled Egg Records, 2005
- The Absence of Birds, Pickled Egg Records, 2008
- The Raven's Empire, Nightjar Records 2012
- The Water Between Us, At the Helm Records, Microcultures 2012
- Dust, At the Helm Records, Microcultures 2015
- Oh, Sealand, At the Helm Records, Microcultures 2017
- Burning! Burning! Nightjar Records 2020
- The Cult of Water, Nightjar Records 2021
- Music from The Cult of Water Nightjar Records 2021
- Four Supernaturals Crossing a River Nightjar Records 2025

== Books ==
- The Cheeky Guide to Brighton, Cheeky Chops Publishing, 1999
- The Cheeky Guide to Oxford, Cheeky Guides Ltd, 2000
- The Number 9 Bus to Utopia, Unbound, 2014
- (with Tim Bick) The Cheeky Guide to Brighton (6th edition), Cheeky Guides Ltd, 2015
- (with Tim Bick and John Ashton) Cheeky Walks in Brighton and Sussex, Cheeky Guides Ltd, 2016
- The Haunted Moustache, Nightfinch Books, 2016
- (with Jo Keeling) The Odditorium: The tricksters, eccentrics, deviants and inventors whose obsessions changed the world, Hodder and Stoughton, 2016
- (with Jo Keeling) The Mysterium: Unexplained and extraordinary phenomena for a post-Nessie generation Hodder and Stoughton, 2017
- (with Jo Keeling) The Odysseum: Strange journeys that obliterated convention Hodder and Stoughton, 2017
- (with Pete Fowler) The Cult of Water, Rough Trade Books, 2020
- (with Philip Carr-Gomm) The Long Man and Friends: Sacred Sussex, Snake River Press, 2025
