= Nick Pynn =

British musician (born 1962)

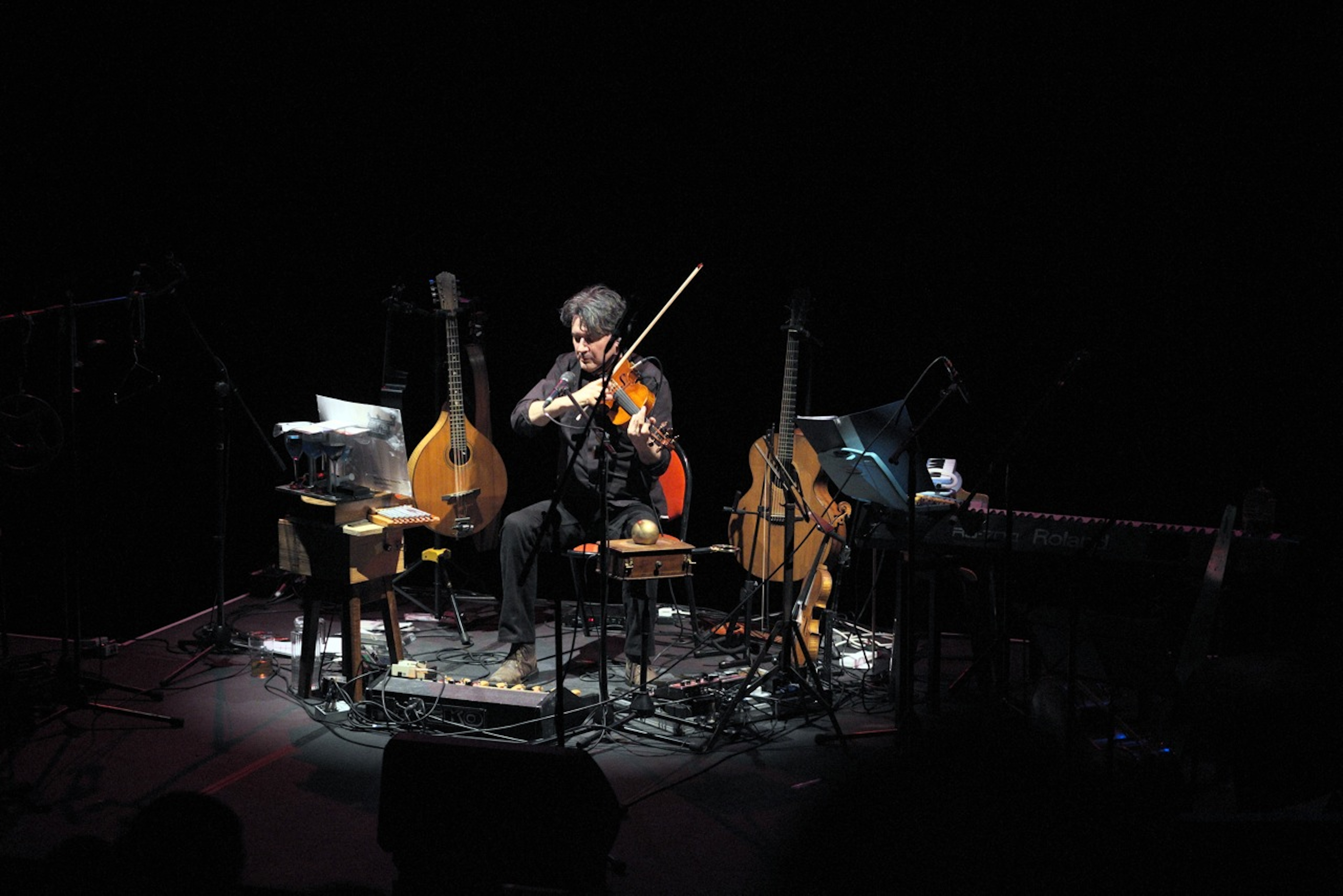
Nick Pynn at The Old Market, Brighton

Nick Pynn (born 17 November 1962) is a British musician and composer noted for his use of bass pedals and live looping with electroacoustic stringed instruments. He has been described as an 'avant folk' artist, whose early interests were in world folk and experimental music.

== Career ==
Having made many of the instruments he still uses, Nick Pynn started his musical career in the mid-80s with the Leigh-on-Sea 'soil music' barn-dance band, The Famous Potatoes. He played fiddle, banjo, mandolin, mandocello and viola on their albums, The Sound of the Ground, It Was Good for My Old Mother, and Born in a Barn.

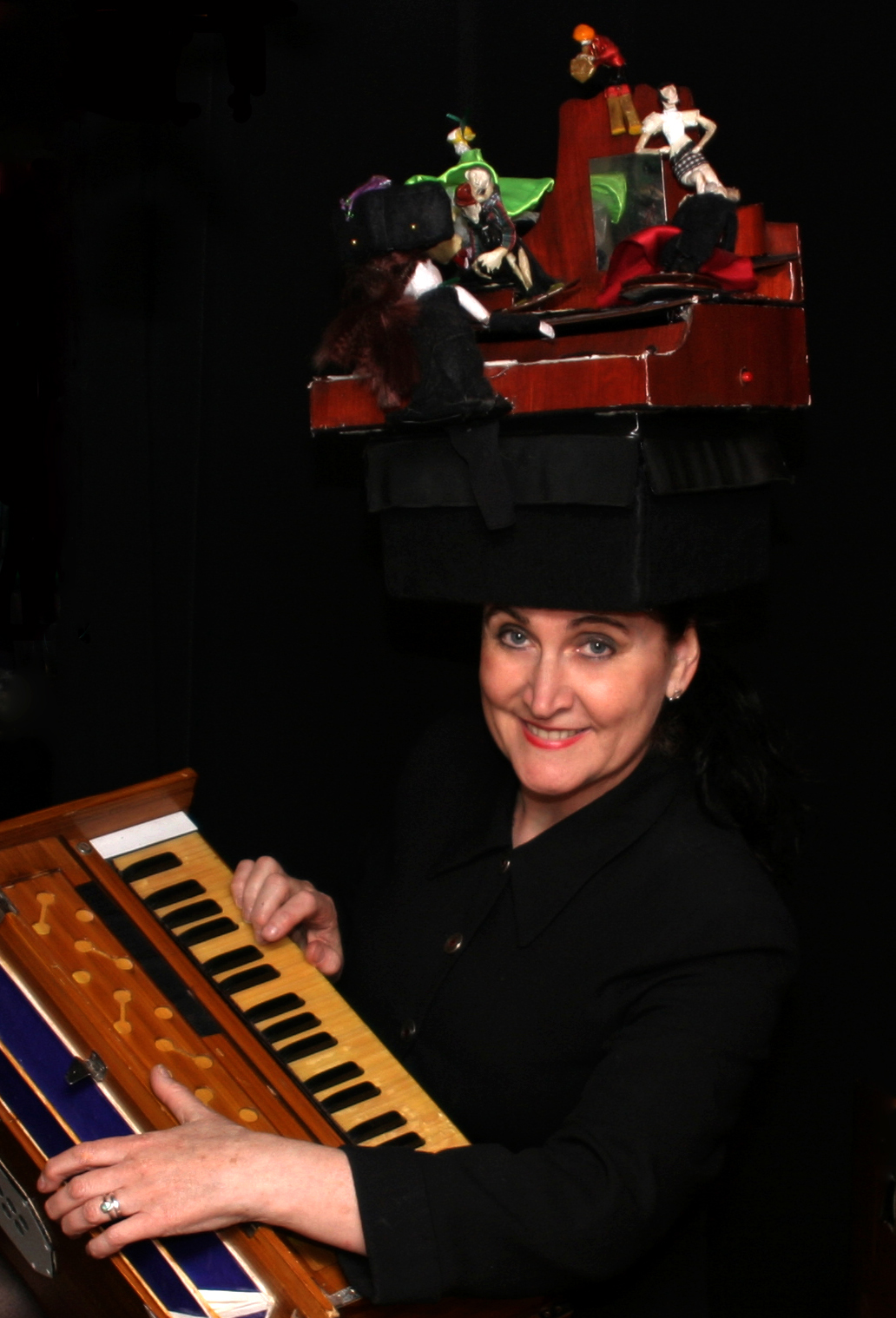
Jane Bom-Bane in 2009

Pynn joined Steve Harley in 1990 on acoustic guitar and fiddle, taking the lead guitar role in 1996. The 'Stripped to the Bare Bones' tour of 1998 with Pynn accompanying Harley on mandocello, dulcimer, acoustic guitar and violin was released on CD Stripped to the Bare Bones from the Jazz Café, London, and the two-man show received a 5 star review at the Edinburgh Festival. The success of these led to Harley and Pynn playing over a hundred dates in 1998, performing under the explanatory tour-title "Stripped to the Bare Bones". Pynn's debut solo CD on the Roundhill label In Mirrored Sky (1995) is a collection of autumnal pieces, and features bass player Herbie Flowers and Adrian Oxaal of James on cello. Flowers introduced Pynn to Richard Durrant, which led to the joint album Nick and Dick (1997). In 2000 Nick joined the new acoustic version of The Crazy World of Arthur Brown. Pynn contributes most of the instrumentation and arrangements on the 2007 release The Voice of Love.

In August 2001, Pynn went to Edinburgh with The Life and Death Orchestra for a Festival production of poetry, written by survivors of the Holocaust put to music. During the second half of the month, he joined American Perrier Award winning comedian Rich Hall in his band, Otis Lee Crenshaw and The Black Liars. Pynn also met Jane Bom-Bane, and together they wrote and produced Rotator, a CD of palindromic (forwards and backwards) songs for 2002, and the Fringe show 'Year of the Palindrome'. Further collaborations followed with comedians Boothby Graffoe, Jo Neary, Simon Munnery, Kevin Eldon, Omid Djalili and Stewart Lee.

Pynn premiered a solo show in 2003 called 'Music from Hotels Rooms, Forests and Submarines', using wine glasses, playing cards and live sampling in addition to his various stringed instruments. In May 2004 Pynn's third solo album Afterplanesman was released, the reissue of which made it into The Sunday Times 100 Best Albums of 2008. In the following year at the Edinburgh Festival, Pynn won a 'Spirit of the Fringe Award' for his music.

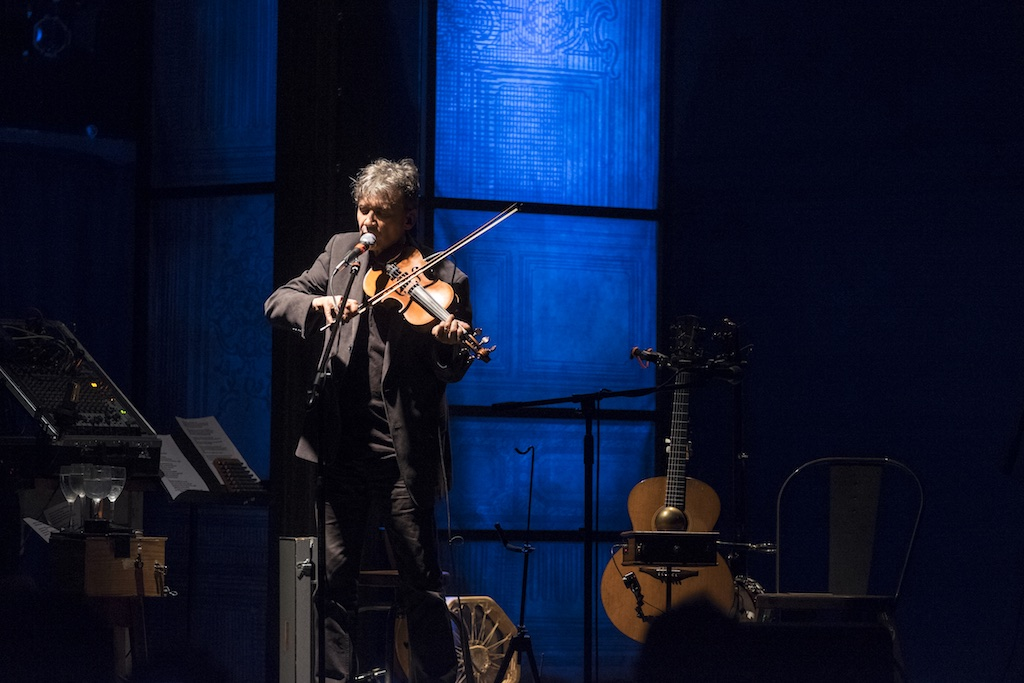
Nick Pynn at The Old Market, Brighton 2015. Photo: Steve McNicholas

2007 started with sell-out shows at the Sydney Opera House with The Lost and Found Orchestra (a creation of Stomp) in which Pynn played musical saw, bed bass, bellows organ, bottle bellows, metallophone, traffic-cone berimbau and squonkaphone amongst other instruments. Later that year, Pynn won the 'Star of the Festival Award' in Brighton, and was co-winner of the 'ThreeWeeks Editor's Award' with Jane Bom-Bane. In November he played solo shows in Dubai and Abu Dhabi.

An album of original Pynn compositions The Colours of the Night released in October 2009 was recorded above Bom-Bane's Cafe in Brighton in which a 12 piece orchestra recorded their parts ‘one at a time’. Nick often tours with Kate Daisy Grant with whom he won The Latest Award for 'Best Music Act' in the Brighton Fringe in 2013. In 2014 Nick was celebrated in the show ‘Stewart Lee & Friends: celebrating the music of Nick Pynn’ at the Brighton Dome in which Nick was joined by guest artists Arthur Brown, Kate Daisy Grant, Boothby Graffoe, Mike Heron, Georgia Seddon and Jane Bom-Bane in an evening of comedy and music. His 2015 self-released album ‘Waterproof’ showcases Nick’s songwriting side.

== Selective discography ==
Solo recordings

- In Mirrored Sky (Roundhill RHLCD43) 1995
- Music from Windows (Roundhill RHLCD99) 1999
- Afterplanesman (Roundhill ROUND004) 2004
- In Mirrored Sky / Music from Windows (Roundhill ROUND007) reissued as double package in August 2007
- The Colours of the Night (Roundhill rhlcd09) 2009
- talktapes (Roundhill rhlcd011) 2011
- Nick Pynn Live at the QEH and Edinburgh Fringe (Roundhill rhlcd012) 2012
- Waterproof (Oscar Records Osc002) 2015
- Buffalo Orbison (Oscar Records Osc003) 2018
- Flipside (Oscar Records Osc005) May 2020
- A Fiddle Album (Oscar Records Osc006) August 2020
- Visions/ Revisions and Impressions (Oscar Records Osc007) June 2024

Collaborations

- Songs for the Trees (Oscar 008) Kate Daisy Grant and Nick Pynn 2025
- Nick And Dick The acoustic collaborations of Nick Pynn and Richard Durrant (LongMan 026CD) 1997; re-issued 2006
- Rotator (Roundhill ROUND2002) Nick Pynn and Jane Bom-Bane 2002
