= Steve Hawley (artist) =

British artist (born 1952)

Steve Hawley (born 1952) is a British artist who has been working in video art and film since the 1980s. Hawley's work, characterised by 'a preoccupation with language and image', has been shown at video festivals and broadcast worldwide. He was Professor of Art and Media at the Manchester School of Art until 2017, when he became Professor Emeritus.

== Early life ==
Hawley grew up in Pontefract, and did an Art Foundation course at Bradford (1978-9). After a Fine Art degree at Brighton Polytechnic (1979–82), he was Arts Council Video Fellow at North East London Polytechnic in 1982-3. At Brighton, he began a long-term collaboration with Tony Steyger, who has written, 'My ongoing work with Steve Hawley challenges me to experiment with ideas and form.'

== We Have Fun Drawing Conclusions ==
In 1981, Hawley made the 'nicely subversive' video film, We Have Fun Drawing Conclusions. Here he uses the words and pictures of the popular 1950s and 60s Ladybird children’s books Peter and Jane. 'Using only the lightest hint of irony, Hawley reads the text over the original illustrations....Peter helps daddy to wash the car while Jane is making tea with mummy in the kitchen. Audiences were well able to laugh at the absurdity of Ladybird’s transparent attempt to manufacture complementary male and female subjects. However, the reality for countless individuals who were exposed to this form of brainwashing at an early age was that they would never entirely shake off the cultural ghosts of Peter and Jane.'

== Drawing Conclusions: The Science Mix ==
Hawley's first collaboration with Tony Steyger was Drawing Conclusions: The Science Mix, in 1982. This recut and fused two adverts for washing machines; one from the 1950s, the other from the 80s. The result 'creates a dialogue between two media visions of a technological utopia – both equally absurd and disturbing'. In 1983, Drawing Conclusions: The Science Mix was shown at the Stedelijk and MoMA New York.

== Trout Descending a Staircase ==
Trout descending a Staircase, commissioned by BBC2 and the Arts Council in 1987, used Paintbox software to create a series of still lifes. 'At the time, the Paintbox could generate a tracer effect that resembled the decaying repeat patterns in Duchamp's’ painting Nude Descending a Staircase No.2. Hawley devised a method whereby he could key into an ornate gilt frame a series of classic still-life subjects – flowers, bananas, leeks and, most absurdly, a trout....These instant Futurist paintings not only exposed the workings of video effects within a modernist framework, but also mocked the march of art historical progress...Hawley seemed to be agreeing with the classic philistine position that ‘even a child could do that’...At the same time, his work reintroduced a narrative – that of the artist in the act of making images – while continually emphasising the constructed nature of what he was creating.'

== Language Lessons ==
In 1995, Hawley and Steyger made Language Lessons, a 35 minute documentary on invented languages from Esperanto to Volapük, a language spoken by only 30 people worldwide. According to Catherine Elwes, 'Language Lessons provides a delightful insight into the more eccentric pastimes of the average Englishman as well as the realisation that all languages are constructed and, as one learned interviewee averred, speaking English now ‘ties you to a world-view of dominant American culture’.' Language Lessons was broadcast on Channel 4 in 1995.

== Love under Mercury ==
Hawley's first cinema film was Love under Mercury, made in 2000, and funded by the Arts Council. It was inspired by Louis Daguerre's invention of the Daguerreotype when some drops of mercury, accidentally spilled from a broken thermometer, developed his iodised photographic plates, and by the fact that early Daguerreotypists suffered from mercury poisoning. It featured the actors Claire Marshall and Richard Lowdon, as two lovers who comment on a stream of images, above all on mercury. The film won a prize at the Ann Arbor Film Festival.

== Amen ICA Cinema ==
For 2002, the year of the Palindrome, Hawley made Amen ICA Cinema, a palindromic video which 'explores the magical power and absurdity of things that go forwards and backwards.' This won the prize for most original video at the Vancouver Videopoem festival in 2003.

== Yarn 2010 ==
Hawley's Yarn 2010 was inspired by Michel Butor's 1956 novel L’Emploi du Temps. The novel, published in English as Passing Time, was based on Butor's experiences as a teacher in Manchester, and his struggles to adapt to the cold, the rain, the fog, the terrible food and other aspects of the British way of life. Hawley presented archive footage of Manchester of the 1950s with a voiceover spoken by a computer programme. By combining different scenes with spoken text he was created a narrative which never repeated itself. On his website, Hawley described the piece as 'a meditation on the nature of narrative itself, as mediated through technology, but also a series of speculations on the real and the fictional Manchester, as seen through the pessimistic eye of an outsider, a foreigner 50 years ago.'

== Manchester Time Machine 2012 ==
Hawley continued his investigation of his city with his IPhone app, Manchester Time Machine 2012, made with the North West Film Archive. Users were able to experience 'a street level tour of Manchester’s streets and people over the last 100 years.....Manchester Time Machine uses rare historical film...to take you back to exactly the same location to experience the scene from the same viewpoint.' This was the first iPhone app to combine archive footage with GPS.

Hawley has also written about Manchester in a book, Imaging the City: Art, Creative Practices and Media Speculations, published by Intellect Books in 2016. He is the author of the introduction and Chapter Two, 'Manchester as a mythical city: Reflections in art and locative media.'

== Actor 2013 ==
Hawley's Actor 2013 is a film made without a camera, using a motion capture suit. Hawley used computer post production to transform the performer, captured using the suit, into a knight in armour, who recites the final chapter of Anthony Burgess’s A Clockwork Orange. It was shown at the Burgess Foundation Manchester and at an exhibition at Bangkok Art and Cultural Centre.

== Stranger than Known; South Home Town ==
Again with Steyger, Hawley made Stranger than Known; South Home Town, filmed in Southampton and exhibited as a video installation there in 2014-2015. Hawley wrote that the piece 'was about Southampton, its identity, or lack of identity, in the 50th anniversary of it being granted the title of city....Drawing from the city symphonies of the 1920s, which used new film techniques to examine the city in the modern world, and through wayfaring its streets and shorelines, the piece looks at the shifting identity of the port and its people. Using ultra slow motion video the work addresses the question, what is home?'

== Calling Blighty ==
In 2016, Hawley collaborated with Marion Hewitt of the North West Film Archive in a project called Calling Blighty. This used nearly 400 filmed messages from servicemen and women in India and Burma, shown to families in local cinemas at the end of the Second World War. Hawley tracked down the relatives of the people in the films, recreating the screenings for them. There was a Channel 4 TV documentary about the project broadcast in June 2016.

Hawley also used the films in War Memorial, an experimental film edited from the Calling Blighty series. In War Memorial, 'the messages themselves recede to the background and the directorial decisions of the largely unknown army filmmakers accumulate to show a different view to the reassuring and brave faces of the men (and a few women), emphasizing instead doubt and uncertainty'. It was shortlisted for an award in the Sheffield Doc Fest 2017.
