= Watling Street (book) =

2017 travelogue by John Higgs

Watling Street: Travels Through Britain and Its Ever-Present Past
- Cover by Steve Marking for the first edition hardback
- Author: John Higgs
- Language: English
- Subject: History
- Publisher: Weidenfeld & Nicolson
- Publication date: July 2017
- Publication place: Great Britain
- Media type: Hardcover, paperback, Kindle
- Pages: 384
- ISBN: 978-1-4746-0347-8

Watling Street: Travels Through Britain and Its Ever-Present Past is the fifth book by the British journalist, novelist and cultural historian John Higgs. The book charts Higgs's journey along Watling Street, one of the oldest roads in Britain, from Dover to Anglesey, during which journey he records the so-called hidden history of this ancient path from its first creation up to the present day. As well as recording the historical figures and their stories surrounding the road, Higgs also meets up with and interviews contemporary figures along the way such as Alan Moore and Alistair Fruish. The author describes the history of the road as, "Watling Street is a road of witches and ghosts, of queens and highwaymen, of history and myth, of Chaucer, Dickens and James Bond. Along this route Boudicca met her end, the battle of Bosworth changed royal history, Bletchley Park code breakers cracked Nazi transmissions and Capability Brown remodelled the English landscape.

== Synopsis ==
Described as 'A journey along one of Britain's oldest roads, from Dover to Anglesey, in search of the hidden history that makes us who we are today,' Higgs traces the footsteps of ancient travellers along the full 276-mile length of Watling Street from beginning to end. Higgs attempts to reveal the forgotten stories and hidden histories of the past that have formed and been told along the thoroughfare, as well as relating ancient histories to modern day Britain.

== Reception ==
The book was generally very well received with positive reviews. Caroline Sanderson of The Bookseller wrote, "One of those books where you constantly find yourself underlining pithy quotes, it's a compelling study of the origins of our national identity, at a time when it's becoming more complex than ever"; the Financial Times's Melkissa Harrison said it was "Mischievous and iconoclastic . . . [Higgs's] is a systematising imagination, able to harness disparate elements and find the patterns that animate them; that he does so in a more socially inclusive manner than many enriches his theories enormously"; and Ian Samson of Times Literary Supplement called it "A new vision of England . . . full of magic, mystery and bits of William Blake."

It was also named Book of the Day by Ian Thompson in The Guardian, with Thompson describing it: "Higgs, who has previously written about Timothy Leary and the KLF, is drawn to off-piste, countercultural subjects. Watling Street, a hybrid of travel journalism and pavement-pounding sociology, is a journey by car, train and on foot along the ancient Watling Street... In chatty, entertaining pages, he excavates Britain for myths and stories that might “serve us better” as we prepare to leave the EU.... The journey opens near St Margaret’s Bay, where Ian Fleming lived in a cottage he bought in the early 1950s from Noël Coward, and ends in the wilds of Anglesey. Higgs hopes that his journey might provide some insight into the strange, dark mood that 'hangs over our seemingly divided country'."

== Podcast version ==
Watling Street was released with a four-part podcast series by John Higgs and the writer/broadcaster David Bramwell in which the two revisit places along Watling Street and features talks, poetry, music performances and conversations with the various guests they are accompanied by and meet up with, including: Alan Moore, Salena Godden, Iain Sinclair, Miranda Kane, C.J. Stone, John Constable, Andy Miller, Daisy Campbell and Lord Victor Adebowale.

== Publication details ==
- Watling Street: Travels Through Britain and Its Ever-Present Past, Weidenfeld & Nicolson, 2017 (UK). ISBN 978-1-4746-0347-8
