= Peter Chrisp =

British writer

Peter Chrisp (born 20 May 1958) is a British children's author of books on history. With over ninety books published, his various works include Blitzkrieg!, Dorling Kindersley's Ancient Egypt Revealed and Ancient Rome Revealed, The Spanish Conquests of the New World, and many more.

He first began writing history after working on the Mass-Observation archive at the University of Sussex. He has also worked as a writer on the online project "Icons of England".

Aside from his publications in literature, he is also an artist, who has exhibited collections of his cartoons and hand-drawn postcards during Brighton Festival. In 2014, his portraits of the Magna Carta barons were displayed in an exhibition in St Edmunsbury Cathedral, and 'were very popular with visiting families and schools'. The illustrations were later displayed as a trail on bollards around the town. In 2017, his Christmas tableaux photographs, with Lisa Wolfe, were featured in The Observer, Der Spiegel, the New Zealand Stuff.co.nz news website, and Brighton's Viva magazine. In 2019, his illustrations of the diary of Thomas Turner began appearing in a monthly column, edited by Mathew Clayton, in Caught by the River.

Since 2013, Chrisp has been writing From Swerve of Shore to Bend of Bay, a blog about James Joyce's Finnegans Wake. The blog has been featured in the Irish Times, where Chrisp was described as an 'eminent Wake scholar' and 'a self-confessed Joyce obsessive'.

== Bibliography ==
- Chrisp, Peter (1988). Conscientious Objectors: 1916 to the Present Day. Tressell Publications. ISBN 0-907586511.
- Chrisp, Peter (1990). Blitzkrieg!. Wayland. ISBN 978-0750200097.
- Chrisp, Peter (1991). The Crusades. Wayland. ISBN 978-0750204750.
- Chrisp, Peter (1991). The Roman Empire. Wayland. ISBN 978-0750201995.
- Chrisp, Peter (1991). The Rise of Islam. Wayland. ISBN 978-0750202855.
- Chrisp, Peter (1991). The Rise of Fascism. Wayland. ISBN 978-0750200240.
- Chrisp, Peter (1992). The Farmer through History. Wayland. ISBN 978-0750203845.
- Chrisp, Peter (1992). The Soldier through History. Wayland. ISBN 978-0750203838.
- Chrisp, Peter (1993). Voyages to the New World. Wayland. ISBN 978-0750207133.
- Chrisp, Peter (1993). The Search for the East. Wayland. ISBN 978-0750207126.
- Chrisp, Peter (1993). The Search for a Northern Route. Wayland. ISBN 978-0750208116.
- Chrisp, Peter (1993). The Romans. Two-Can. ISBN 978-1854342157.
- Chrisp, Peter (1994). History Makers of the Middle Ages. Wayland. ISBN 978-0750212687.
- Chrisp, Peter (1994). Clothes (Tudors and Stuarts). Wayland. ISBN 978-0750211512.
- Chrisp, Peter (1994). Food (Tudors and Stuarts). Wayland. ISBN 978-0750211116.
- Chrisp, Peter (1994). Family Life in Roman Britain. Wayland. ISBN 978-0750210058.
- Chrisp, Peter (1994). The Incas. Wayland. ISBN 978-0750210683.
- Chrisp, Peter (1994). The Maya. Wayland. ISBN 978-0750210669.
- Chrisp, Peter (1995). The Whalers. Wayland. ISBN 978-0750212014.
- Chrisp, Peter (1996). Mapping the Unknown. Wayland. ISBN 978-0750213844.
- Chrisp, Peter (1996). History of Toys and Games. Wayland. ISBN 978-0750216791.
- Chrisp, Peter (1996). Great Journeys. Wayland. ISBN 978-0750218313.
- Chrisp, Peter (1996). The Norman Conquest. Wayland. ISBN 978-0750217439.
- Chrisp, Peter (1997). A Tudor Kitchen (Living in History). Heinemann. ISBN 978-0431068237.
- Chrisp, Peter (1997). A Victorian Kitchen (Living in History). Heinemann. ISBN 978-0431068213.
- Chrisp, Peter (1997). A Victorian School (Living in History). Heinemann. ISBN 978-0431068275.
- Chrisp, Peter (1997). The Colosseum. Wayland. ISBN 978-0750219891.
- Chrisp, Peter (1997). The Parthenon. Wayland. ISBN 978-0750219938.
- Chrisp, Peter (1997). Invaders. BBC Active. ISBN 978-0563376262.
- Chrisp, Peter (1998). Look Inside a Shakespearean Theatre. Hodder Wayland. ISBN 978-0750222822.
- Chrisp, Peter (1998). A Tudor School (Living in History). Heinemann. ISBN 978-0431068251.
- Chrisp, Peter (1999). The World of the Roman Emperor. Macdonald Young Books. ISBN 978-0750026918.
- Chrisp, Peter (1999). Ancient Greece (My World). Two-Can. ISBN 978-1587280665.
- Chrisp, Peter (1999). The Aztecs (History Beneath Your Feet). Wayland. ISBN 978-0750223638.
- Chrisp, Peter (1999). On the Trail of the Victorians in Britain. Franklin Watts. ISBN 978-0749632304.
- Chrisp, Peter (1999). On the Trail of the Celts in Britain. Franklin Watts. ISBN 978-0749638191.
- Chrisp, Peter (1999). On the Trail of the Vikings in Britain. Franklin Watts. ISBN 978-0749635916.
- Chrisp, Peter (1999). Vikings (My World). Two-Can. ISBN 978-1854346032.
- Chrisp, Peter (2000). Look Inside a Greek Theatre. Hodder Wayland. ISBN 978-0750225892.
- Chrisp, Peter (2000). Welcome to the Globe! (The Story of Shakespeare's Theatre). Dorling Kindersley. ISBN 978-0789466402.
- Chrisp, Peter (2000). The Illustrated World of the Tudors. Hodder Wayland. ISBN 9780-750226080.
- Chrisp, Peter (2001). Disasters and Diseases. Marks and Spencers. ISBN 978-1842731925.
- Chrisp, Peter (2001). Crime and Punishment. Marks and Spencers. ISBN 978-1842733448.
- Chrisp, Peter (2001). The Cuban Missile Crisis. Hodder Wayland. ISBN 978-0750233897.
- Chrisp, Peter (2001). Christopher Columbus: Explorer of the New World. Dorling Kindersley. ISBN 978-0751313888.
- Chrisp, Peter (2002). Victorian Crime (The History Detective Investigates). Hodder Wayland. ISBN 978-0750237406.
- Chrisp, Peter (2002). Shakespeare (Eyewitness Guide). Dorling Kindersley. ISBN 978-0750235860.
- Chrisp, Peter (2002). Kennedy (20th Century Leaders). Hodder Wayland. ISBN 978-0750235860.
- Chrisp, Peter (2002). Joseph Stalin (20th Century Leaders). Hodder Wayland. ISBN 978-0750235853.
- Chrisp, Peter (2003). Ancient Greece Revealed. Dorling Kindersley. ISBN 978-0751367737.
- Chrisp, Peter (2003). The Vikings (Strange Histories). Belitha Press. ISBN 978-1841386669.
- Chrisp, Peter (2003). Ancient Rome Revealed. Dorling Kindersley. ISBN 978-0789497482.
- Chrisp, Peter (2003). Alexander the Great: Legend of a Warrior King. Dorling Kindersley. ISBN 978-0751337495.
- Chrisp, Peter (2004). Mummy (E Guide). Dorling Kindersley. ISBN 978-0756622954.
- Chrisp, Peter (2004). Ancient Rome (History in Art). Raintree. ISBN 978-1844433605.
- Chrisp, Peter (2004). Mesopotamia: Iraq in Ancient Times. Franklin Watts. ISBN 978-0749654542.
- Chrisp, Peter (2004). Warfare (Medieval Realms). Hodder Wayland. ISBN 978-0750244350.
- Chrisp, Peter (2004). The War in the Pacific. Hodder Wayland. ISBN 978-0750240147.
- Chrisp, Peter (2004). Warfare (Medieval Realms). Hodder Wayland. ISBN 978-0750244350.
- Chrisp, Peter (2006). Ancient Greece (E Explore). Dorling Kindersley. ISBN 978-0756619565.
- Chrisp, Peter (2006). Pyramid. Dorling Kindersley. ISBN 978-1405311267.
- Chrisp, Peter (2006). Ancient Rome. Dorling Kindersley. ISBN 978-0756652203.
- Chrisp, Peter (2008). Prehistory. Dorling Kindersley. ISBN 978-0756634605.
- Chrisp, Peter (2009). Atlas of Ancient Worlds. Dorling Kindersley. ISBN 978-1405336659.
- Chrisp, Peter (2009). Imagine You're a Knight. Barron's Educational. ISBN 978-0764162039.
- Chrisp, Peter (2009). Dinosaur Detectives. Dorling Kindersley. ISBN 978-1405341097.
- Chrisp, Peter (2010). The Most Brilliant, Boldly Going Book of Exploration Ever…by the Brainwaves. Dorling Kindersley. ISBN 978-1405352079.
- Chrisp, Peter (2011). Explore Titanic. Carlton Books. ISBN 978-1847328830.
- Chrisp, Peter (2011). Pirates. Kingfisher. ISBN 978-0753430736.
- Chrisp, Peter (2011). The Second World War: Fighting for Freedom. Carlton. ISBN 978-1847324863.
- Chrisp, Peter (2013). Chrisp's Crime Miscellany. Ilex. ISBN 978-1781570968.
- Chrisp, Peter (2013). Civil War. Sandy Creek. ISBN 978-1435149441.
- Chrisp, Peter (2014). The Vietnam War: The Causes, Events and Legacy. Scholastic. ISBN 978-0545793957.
- Chrisp, Peter (2015). Explore 360° Pompeii. Barron's Educational Series. ISBN 978-0764167669.
- Chrisp, Peter (2016). Ancient Rome (DKfindout!). Dorling Kindersley. ISBN 978-0241250235.
- Chrisp, Peter (2018). Bible Characters. Dorling Kindersley. ISBN 978-0241309612.

As co-author or contributor

- The Roman Empire (Make it Work!). Two-Can. 1996. ISBN 978-1854343635.
- 1,000 Makers of the Millennium. Dorling Kindersley. 1999. ISBN 978-0751356649.
- Explorers and Exploration. Marshall Cavendish. 2004. ISBN 978-0761475354.
- Exploring Ancient Civilizations. Marshall Cavendish. 2004. ISBN 978-0761474562.
- Exploring the Middle Ages. Marshall Cavendish. 2006. ISBN 978-0761476139.
- The Children's Bible. Dorling Kindersley. 2008. ISBN 978-1405342797.
- Egyptorium. Dorling Kindersley. 2008. ISBN 978-1405329514.
- Wow! The Visual Encyclopedia of Everything. Dorling Kindersley. 2008. ISBN 978-1405322485.
- The Grammar of the Ancient World. Ivy Press. 2009. ISBN 978-0500288344.
- History Year by Year. DK Publishing (Dorling Kindersley). 2013. ISBN 978-1465414182.
- Jonny Hannah: Greetings from Darktown: An Illustrator's Miscellany. Merrell Publishers Ltd. 2014. ISBN 978-1858946191.
- Big History. Dorling Kindersley. 2016. ISBN 978-0241225905.
- Art: A Children's Encyclopedia. Dorling Kindersley. 2017. ISBN 978-0241297650.
- Timelines of Everything. Dorling Kindersley. 2018. ISBN 978-0241302323.
- Children's Illustrated History Atlas. Dorling Kindersley. 2018. ISBN 978-0241319901.
- General Knowledge Genius!. Dorling Kindersley. 2019. ISBN 978-0241336243.
- The Law Book. Dorling Kindersley. 2020. ISBN 978-0241410196.
- Explanatorium. Dorling Kindersley. 2021. ISBN 978-0241412985.

== See also ==
- Dorling Kindersley
