= In Mirrored Sky =

Studio album by Nick Pynn
- Released: 1995
- Genre: Folk
- Length: 39:59
- Label: Roundhill
- Producer: Simon Morris

Nick Pynn chronology
Afterplanesman	In Mirrored Sky	Music From Windows

In Mirrored Sky (1995) is the debut studio album from multi-instrumentalist and composer Nick Pynn. Re-issued August 2007 as a double package with the follow-up 'Music from Windows'.

== Track listing ==
1. "In Osnabrück"
2. "Glide"
3. "Through Trees"
4. "The Mill"
5. "The Tunnel and the Fair"
6. "A Quarter-Past Kite"
7. "Sunday's Window"
8. "The Myth of the Land Diver"
9. "In Mirrored Sky"
10. "The Correct Selection of Gears : CHU 394C R.I.P"
11. "For Chloe"
12. "The Illusionist"
13. "Under a Greek Moon"
14. "A Stiller Place"

The subtitle of track 10 "The Correct Selection of Gears" comes from an owners workshop manual. Track 11, "For Chloe" was written for Pynn's daughter shortly after her birth.

The album is dedicated to the memory of Pynn's mother, Joan Margaret Pynn. 9 February 1922 - 17 April 1995.

The Album was recorded at Anzak Studios, Brighton.

== Musical credits ==
- Nick Pynn – violin, acoustic guitar, dulcimer, mandocello, bouzouki, mandolin and 5 string banjo
- Herbie Flowers – double bass on "Through Trees", "Glide", "In Mirrored Sky", and "The Correct Selection of Gears"
- Adrian Oxaal – cello on "Glide"
- Neil Smith – darabhuka on "The Mill" and "The Tunnel and the Fair"
- Maxine Sweatman – hurdy-gurdy on "The Tunnel and the Fair"

== Production credits ==
- Simon Morris - Engineer
- Sandy Cameron - Photography
- Mike Mussell - Design
