= Other World Kingdom =

Micronation in the Czech Republic

- Micronation (unrecognized entity)
- Location: Žďár nad Sázavou District, Czech Republic
- Area claimed: 0.03 km^{2} (0.012 sq mi)
- Dates claimed: 1 June 1996–present

The Other World Kingdom (OWK) was a large, commercial BDSM and femdom facility, resort, and purported micronation ruled in the style of absolute monarchy and matriarchy, which opened in 1996 using the buildings and grounds of a 16th-century château located in the municipality of Černá in Žďár nad Sázavou District, Czech Republic. Although not recognized by any other country, it claimed to have its own currency, passports, police force, courts, state flag, and state hymn.

== History ==
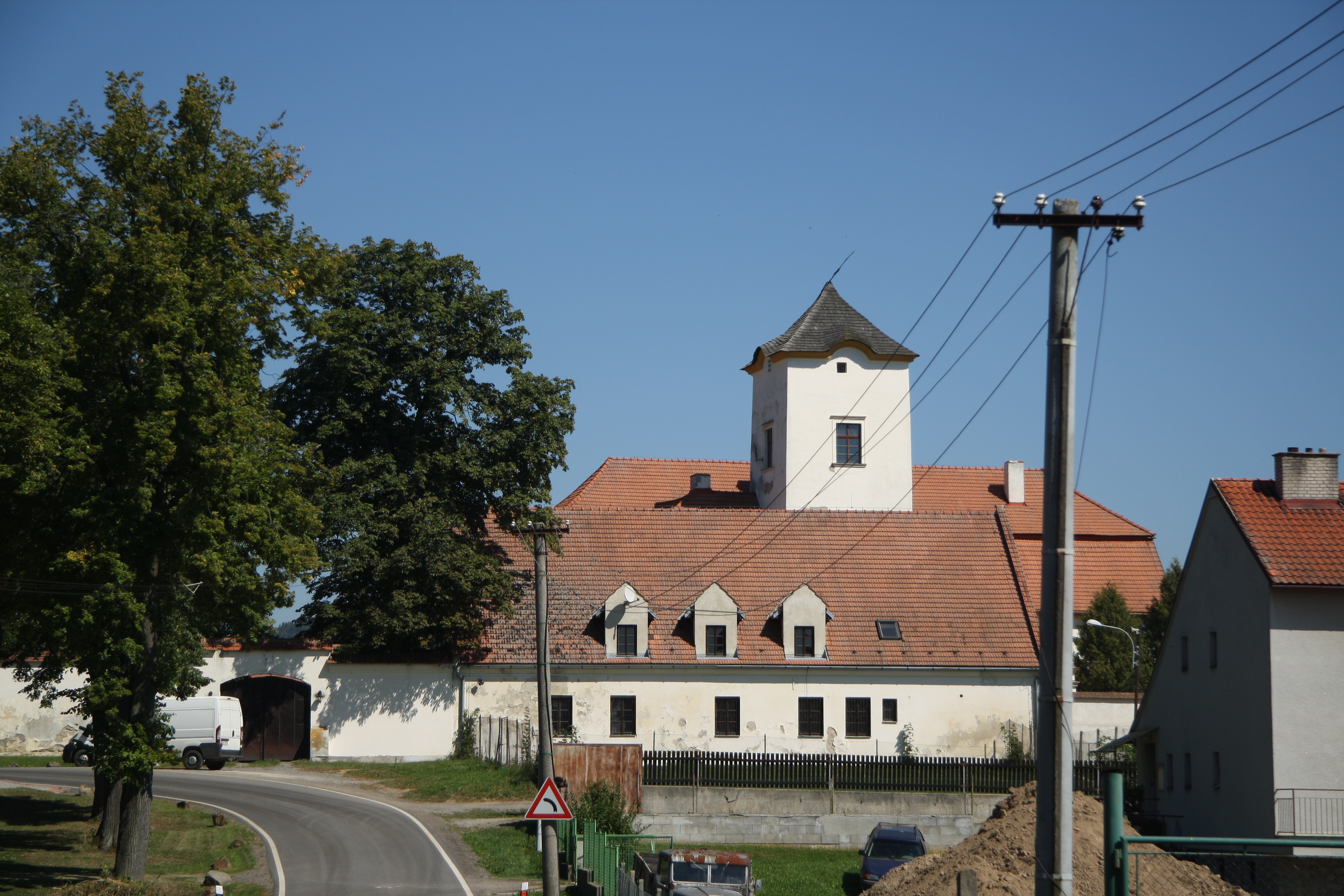
Château in Černá

The Other World Kingdom was officially founded on June 1, 1996, and was open to visitors by the spring of 1997, after two years of construction costing £2 million.

It provided a dominance and submission environment of a size and consistency not available at any other facility in the world.

The land and buildings were offered for sale in 2008, with an asking price of eight million euros. The sale particulars suggested the property was suitable for use as a hotel, restaurant, residence, or nursing home. As of 2016, it was still for sale. As of 2020, the Other World Kingdom still owns the building and organizes regular events at the property.

On May 24, 2016, Queen Patricia I created the Womania Empire and started a fundraiser to acquire land that would serve as the headquarters for the organization. The objective of Womania Empire is to create a new matriarchal BDSM society similar to what OWK was.

== Government ==
The Other World Kingdom styled itself as a matriarchy, where women ruled. It also had strong BDSM and female dominance themes. The state's goal was stated as "to get as many male creatures under the unlimited rule of Superior Women on as much territory as possible." The OWK had always billed itself as a state; it was, however, a private, for-profit enterprise with no connection to any recognized sovereign state.

The Other World Kingdom was supposedly ruled by Queen Patricia I, an absolute monarch whose coronation took place on May 30 and 31, 1997. She was able to amend laws and other legal issues. Her other roles included "Sublime Supreme Administrator" ("supervision over all activities within the Area and the Office of the Supreme Administrator"), "Sublime Administrator of the Treasury" (financial issues) and of the queen's court and the queen's guard.

Below the queen were a series of different classes. The first was the "Sublime Ladies" or "Ladies Citizens," who formed the Kingdom's nobility. To become a citizen, a woman had to fulfill certain criteria. These were:

- The woman must have reached the age of consent.
- The ownership of at least one male slave.
- Obeying the principles and laws of the Other World Kingdom.
- Sending an application for citizenship.
- Spending at least five nights in the Area of Queen's Palace.

The next class was the queen's subjects. These were men who followed Other World Kingdom law, obeyed the queen and paid her taxes, but had some rights such as "freedom to travel, own property and deal with such property, have children, change employment, enterprise and state his opinion." The lowest class was the "slave" class. This was a class of men who had forfeited all rights, were property of the queen or Sublime Ladies, and were considered to be "on the level of a normal farm animal."

== Facilities ==
The site was 3 hectares (7.4 acres) in area, with several buildings, and a 250-meter (820 ft) oval track, small lake and grassed lawns. The main building was the Queen's Palace, which was the residence of the monarch, and contained a banqueting hall, library, throne room, torture chamber, schoolroom, gym, and extensive basement prison, the cells of which could be hired. Additional visitor accommodation is provided in the Long House, including the Countess Elizabeth Báthory Chambers, complete with two torture chambers. This building also contained a swimming pool, pub, restaurant, and the Wanda Nightclub. The outdoor facilities were supplemented by a sawdust-covered indoor riding hall and stables.

== See also ==
- Exit to Eden - Anne Rice's novel describing a fictional BDSM resort
- Story of O - featuring the château of Roissy
