= Brighton Fringe =

Arts festival in Brighton, England

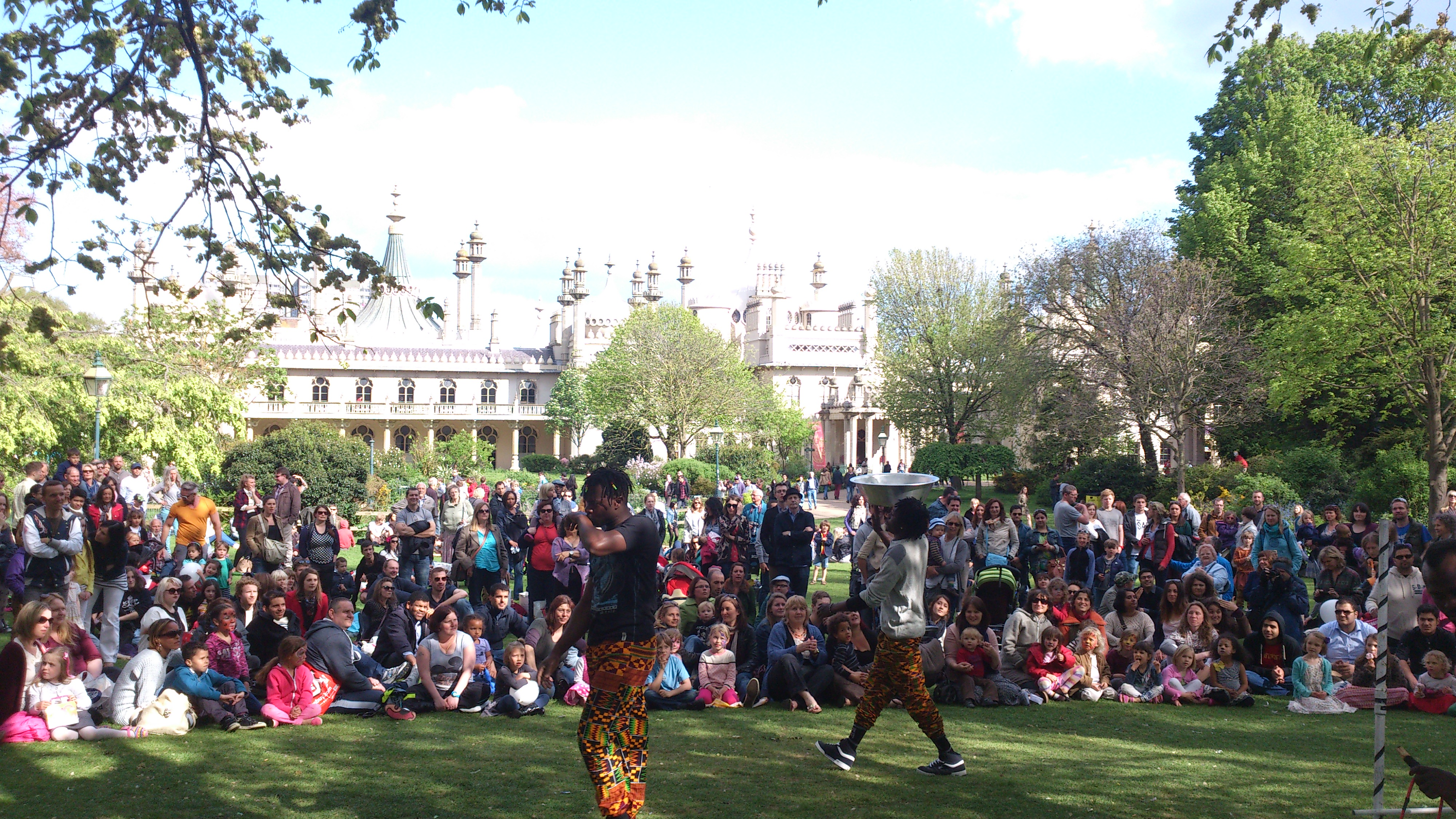
- Performers at Fringe City
- Status: Active
- Genre: Festival
- Location: Brighton
- Country: England
- Attendance: 605,000
- Leader: Amy Keogh
- Patrons: Richard Jordan, The Pebble Trust
- Website: brightonfringe.org

Brighton Fringe is an open-access arts festival held annually in Brighton, England. It is the largest annual arts festival in England and one of the largest fringe festivals in the world. The programme of 2018 included 1008 events at over 166 venues across 4 weeks, in May and June.

== Introduction ==
Brighton Fringe runs at a similar time to Brighton Festival, and in 2013 extended its run to four weeks.

One of the event's main objectives is to promote local talent and the arts. It also offers performers an opportunity for their event to be reviewed or picked up by promoters, as well as going on to Edinburgh. This is why anyone can put on a Brighton Fringe event. Open access means that Brighton Fringe does not curate works which are performed. Anyone can register as a performer and negotiate with a Fringe affiliated venue. In 2011 Brighton Fringe launched the Professional Development Programme, aimed at offering workshops to aspiring performers wanting to progress in the business. In 2012, Brighton Fringe opened its own on-street box office, which provided a physical base for the arts event, selling tickets as well as being a hub for promoters and performers. They also launched "Brighton in the Square", a showcase of Brighton Fringe performers at the Leicester Square Theatre in London.

As part of the 2012 Cultural Olympiad, Brighton Fringe introduced the Dip Your Toe project in 2012, which featured performances in six custom-built Victorian bathing machines, which were located throughout Brighton and Hove during the month of May. In 2014, the organisation launched an Arts Council England supported scheme called "Window" which showcases productions suitable for touring.

Brighton Fringe is a registered charity but does not rely on public funding, in fact, less than 3% of its income is generated from public sources. The other sources of revenue include participants’ registration fees, advertising, sponsorship and Friends memberships.

== History ==
Fringe activity has run alongside Brighton Festival since its creation in 1967. In 1972 Sussex University student Titus Alexander set up a society to stage fringe events, including a centenary play The Legend and True History of Aubrey Beardsley, with Christopher Pope as Beardsley, which went to the Edinburgh Fringe.

The Fringe established itself as a limited company and registered charity in October 2006, with its own board of directors and complete financial independence from the Festival. In 2012 it rebranded itself as Brighton Fringe. In this period of time the organisation more than doubled in size, increasing from 323 shows in 2007 to 719 in 2012, bringing visitors into the city and boosting tourism and local businesses. Julian Caddy was CEO of Brighton Fringe between October 2011 and June 2023. He helped establish the Famous Spiegel Garden in 2013, which in 2014 was renamed the Brighton Spiegeltent.

The programme of 2018 included two new seasons. The Freedom Season – a programme of events that are accessible to a range of audiences with access needs, including those with physical and invisible disabilities, and the Finnish Season. Furthermore, 2018 also saw the return of the Dutch Season and the return of late-night Fringe City.

The Managing Director is Amy Keogh and the Chair of Trustees is Duncan Lustig-Prean

In 2020, Brighton Fringe was scheduled to run from 1 May until the 31 May; however due to the COVID-19 pandemic, the festival was rescheduled for an unconfirmed date in September or October 2020.

== Open access ==
Brighton Fringe is an open-access mixed arts event, which means it does not book performers, but is approached by people wishing to put events on and be part of the Fringe. Participants can vary from the complete beginner to the hardened professional show, and everything in between. Therefore, anyone can put an event on as part of Brighton Fringe. For example, in May 2019 - Unframed Lives was a photographic exhibition, panel event and installation for Brighton Fringe. It’s a creative collaboration between people who have experienced homelessness under austerity as a resistance project. It shows the use of art and research as a community dialogue to reflect on the lived experience of homeless people under austerity.

== Venues ==
A venue for Brighton Fringe can be anything; from a large concert hall or theatre to a private house, a park, or on one occasion, a bath.

With the increase of large high-profile venues, some commentators have suggested that Brighton Fringe may be reaching a similar profile as the Edinburgh Fringe.

== Fringe City ==
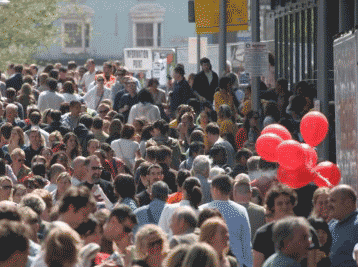
Picture from "Fringe City" on the opening day of the 2007 Brighton Festival Fringe

In a similar vein to the use of the Royal Mile at the Edinburgh Festival Fringe, "Fringe City", a free event taking place in the New Road, Pavilion Gardens and Jubilee Street area of Brighton, was first introduced in 2007. By 2008, it was taking place every Saturday of May, and provides a showcase for any of the performers from the Fringe. In 2015, Fringe City saw audiences of 75,000, and in 2016, Fringe City saw audiences of 100.000, and takes place every weekend throughout the festival, alongside Family Picnic events on some weekends.

== Fringe Academy ==
Fringe Academy is a year-round programme of more than fifty free workshops providing skills-basked training, advice and support for individuals looking to expand their knowledge and understanding of the arts. Brighton Fringe brings thereby a host of experts from Brighton University and Arts Council England for instance, which secures a high level of learning.

== Awards and Bursaries ==
Every year Brighton Fringe hand out awards in the various categories to the best events and companies participating in the Fringe. Furthermore, Brighton Fringe a number of bursaries and funding opportunities for Brighton Fringe participants.

2026 Winners :

- The Nest New Writing Award with Chichester Festival Theatre: Poppies
- Komedia Award for Alternative Comedy with The Nest at Chichester Festival Theatre: Benjamin Alborough in Late Night with Terry Wogan
- International Touring Award in association with the Pebble Trust: Beaverhausen
- Gold Arts Spirit of the Fringe Award: Sarah French
