= John Higgs =

English writer (born 1971)

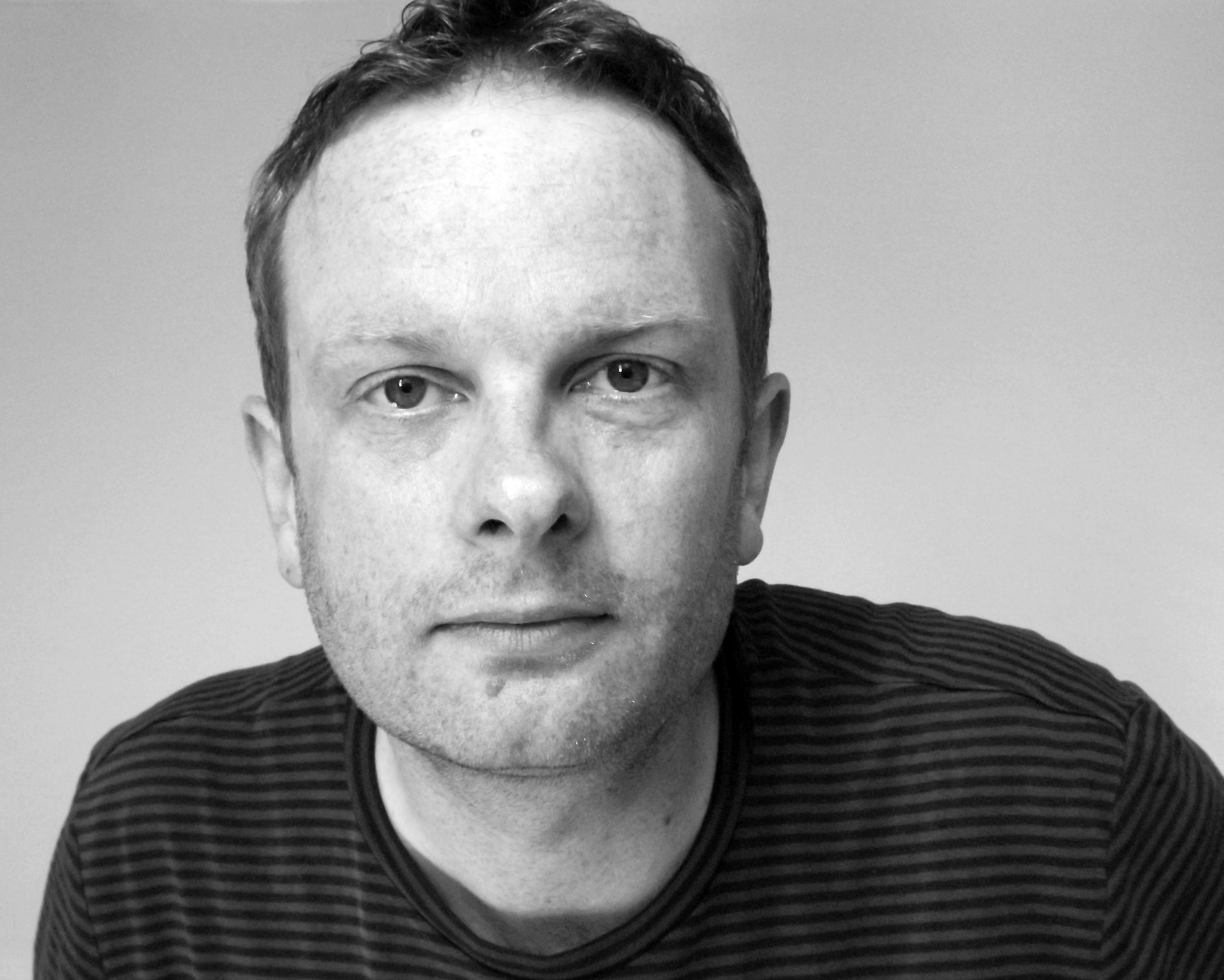
- Higgs in 2012
- Born: John Higgs; 1971 (age 54–55); Rugby, England
- Occupations: Author; Journalist; Cultural Commentator
- Website: johnhiggs.com

John Higgs is an English writer, novelist, journalist and cultural historian. The work of Higgs has been published in the form of novels (under the pseudonym JMR Higgs), biographies and works of cultural history.

In particular, Higgs has written about the 1960s counterculture, exemplified by writers, artists and activists such as Timothy Leary, Robert Anton Wilson, Alan Moore and The KLF.

== Career ==
Higgs began as a director of children’s television and was BAFTA-nominated for pre-school animation before going on to create and produce the BBC Radio 4 quiz X Marks the Spot. At Climax Group studios he was videogame producer for games that appeared on Xbox, PS2 and GameCube including Crash 'n' Burn and ATV Quad Power Racing.

Higgs has written for The Guardian, The Independent, The Daily Mirror and Mojo magazine.

As an author, Higgs has written the novels The First Church on the Moon and The Brandy of the Damned; biographies of Timothy Leary and the KLF; and works of history and cultural analysis. His book The KLF: Chaos, Magic and the Band who Burned a Million Pounds was named one of the best music books of 2013 by The Guardian.

In 2023, Higgs collaborated with musician Ian Broudie on Broudie's memoir Tomorrow's Here Today. In 2024 he co-founded the East Sussex Psychedelic Film Club with Richard Norris and Andy Starke.

Higgs' latest book is Exterminate/Regenerate: The Story of Doctor Who, published in April 2025.

Born in Rugby, Higgs grew up in Buckley, North Wales and now lives with his family in Brighton.

== Robert Anton Wilson, Illuminatus! and Cosmic Trigger ==
In his 2013 book, KLF, Higgs’s interest in the American counter culture writer Robert Anton Wilson led to him writing about the stage play version of Wilson's The Illuminatus! Trilogy books as directed by Ken Campbell and which were performed at the National Theatre in 1977. During Higgs’s research, he interviewed Campbell’s wife, the actress Prunella Gee, and learned that their daughter, Daisy Campbell, was at the time thinking about staging a theatrical version of Wilson's Cosmic Trigger. Higgs supported and championed the production of the play with various talks around the country and the play was eventually staged in Liverpool and London in 2014 and staged again at The Cockpit Theatre in London in 2017.

Higgs involvement in the Cosmic Trigger play led to Robert Anton Wilson's estate – the Robert Anton Wilson Trust – to ask him to write an introduction for a new edition of Cosmic Trigger: The Final Secret of the Illuminati, published by the Wilson estate's new imprint, Hilaritas Press, in 2016.

== Books ==
=== Biographies and History ===
- I Have America Surrounded: The Life of Timothy Leary (The Friday Project, 2006)
- The KLF: Chaos, Magic and the Band who Burned a Million Pounds (Weidenfeld & Nicolson, 2013)
- 2000TC: Standing On The Verge Of Getting It On (2014), in a limited edition of 111 copies
- Our Pet Queen: A New Perspective on Monarchy (Signal, 2014)
- Stranger Than We Can Imagine: Making Sense of the Twentieth Century (Weidenfeld & Nicolson, 2016)
- Watling Street: Travels Through Britain and Its Ever-Present Past (Weidenfeld & Nicolson, 2017)
- The Future Starts Here: Adventures in the Twenty-First Century (Weidenfeld & Nicolson, 2019)
- William Blake Now: Why He Matters More Than Ever (Hachette UK, 2019)
- William Blake vs the World (Weidenfeld & Nicolson, 2021)
- Love and Let Die: Bond, The Beatles and the British Psyche (Weidenfeld & Nicolson, 2022) (Pegasus Books, 2023)
- Exterminate/Regenerate: The Story of Doctor Who (Weidenfeld & Nicolson, 2025)
- Lynchian: The Spell of David Lynch (Weidenfeld & Nicolson, 2025)

=== Fiction as JMR Higgs ===
- The Brandy of the Damned (The Big Hand Books, 2012)
- The First Church on the Moon (The Big Hand Books, 2013)

=== Contributor ===
- Cosmic Trigger - The Final Secret of the Illuminati - Introduction by John Higgs (Hilaritas Press, 2016)
- Who Killed the KLF? (Documentary)
