= Paintbox (software) =

Graphics utility for the ZX Spectrum

- Original author: Joe Gillespie
- Developer: Print'n'Plotter Products Ltd
- Initial release: 1983; 43 years ago
- Stable release: Paint Plus / 1985
- Operating system: ZX Spectrum
- Type: bitmap graphics editor
- License: Proprietary

Paintbox was a graphics utility released for the ZX Spectrum 48K in 1983. Published by Print'n'Plotter Products Ltd in the UK and latter re-released by Erbe Software S.A. in Spain. The program was written by Joe Gillespie.

In 1985 a second version was released under the name of Paint Plus, featuring a user-defined graphics editor, precision plotter, screen planner and an organizer.

== See also ==
- OCP Art Studio
