= Lori Bruner =

Lorraine L. Bruner
- Born: Lorraine Lenore White; January 24, 1932; Toronto, Ontario
- Died: December 18, 2009 (aged 77); Sunnybrook Hospital, Toronto, Ontario
- Known for: Musician
- Parent(s): Marie Clarinda (Clara) White née Allary and Clifford James White.

Lori Bruner (January 24, 1932 – December 18, 2009, Toronto, Ontario, Canada) was one of the preeminent women during the 1950s and 1960s to break through the glass ceiling within the male-dominated Canadian record industry. Bruner was also a pioneer in support of the Canadian music industry Cancon momentum. In her later years, Bruner acquired the Book Cellar (Yorkville) which was considered by many to be the best independent book store in Canada.

== Early life and family ==
Lorraine "Lori" Lenore Bruner was born on January 24, 1932, in Toronto, Ontario, the second daughter of Marie Clarinda (Clara) White née Allary and Clifford James White.

Bruner spent her childhood growing up in Toronto, Ontario with her siblings, Percy, Cynthia, and Patricia. In 1943, at the age of 11, Bruner was sent to live in foster care until she was 16 and then lived with Arthur and Katie Roseborough in Scarborough, Ontario. She had 3 brothers and many nephews and a niece Bruner eventually moved to Dartmouth, Nova Scotia with the Roseborough's. While living in Nova Scotia, Bruner earned a job at a local retail record store, where she met Rodeo Records creator George Taylor. George encouraged Bruner to consider a career in Canada's fast growing record industry.

On July 15, 1955, Bruner was married to Canadian Naval Airman, Peter Charles Bruner at the chapel on the Shearwater Naval Base in Dartmouth, Nova Scotia. They separated in 1958, finally divorcing on September 29, 1961. They had no children together.

== Music ==
After her separation, Bruner moved back to Toronto in late 1958. She followed up on Taylor's counsel and began working at the Promenade Music Centre in the prestigious Bay-Bloor district. In the late-1950s Bruner moved over to run the Promenade Music Center store at Yonge-St. Clair and by 1958 she was managing the Disc Shop in Scarborough's Golden Mile Plaza. In 1959, Bruner moved to an inside sales position for London Records of Canada distributor MacKay Records. In 1960, Bruner joined Astral Records and became second in command. While there, Bruner was responsible for a number of British hits in North America by artists like Lonnie Donegan, Kenny Ball, and Petula Clark.

In 1964 Bruner signed on with RPM Magazine where she collaborated with RPM's Publisher, Walt Grealis on a weekly industry insider column. While there, Bruner also worked with Grealis and RPM's co-founder, Stan Klees to spearhead the "Cancon Momentum" which led to the legislation of Canadian record play on AM radio in 1971. Together, the trio also established the RPM Gold Leaf Awards which became the Juno Awards in 1971. Today, the Juno's are one of the highest rated Canadian variety programs on television.

In 1967, while working at RPM Magazine, Bruner was approached by Polydor Ltd. to work as Senior Manager Regional Promotion. During her tenure at Ploydor, Bruner was regarded as a promotional genius and was credited with contributing to a large share of Polydor's outstanding growth in Canada. During her tenure, Bruner promoted many successful bands like the Bee Gees, Thin Lizzy, Cream, B.B. King, Leon Thomas, James Last, Rush, Frank Mills, and Bachman-Turner Overdrive. Bruner's success and accomplishments at Polydor trail blazed the way for other women who wanted to break into the male-dominated Canadian record companies. She is still considered a hero to many of the women who work in the industry today.

== Books ==
In 1983, Bruner purchased the Book Cellar in Toronto's prestigious Yorkville area from Bruce and Vivienne Surtees. The Book Cellar was considered by many to be one of the best independent book stores in Canada. With its sophisticated collection of fictional and classic books and magazines, and perpetually high quality jazz and classical music in the background, the store provided an intellectual yet relaxed atmosphere. It was hard to pass by the Book Cellar without dropping in.

Situated across from the renowned Four Seasons Yorkville Hotel, the Book Cellar was the book store to the stars. Bruner often received prominent clientele including Elizabeth Taylor, Shirley MacLaine, Madonna, Mick Jagger, Whoopi Goldberg, and Keith Richards, who frequented her store when in Toronto. Local journalists and writers, like Philip Marchand, Robert Fulford, and Judy Stoffman would also stop in often. Bruner also hosted many world-famous authors like Robertson Davies, Marshall McLuhan, Michael Ondaatje, Sir Peter Ustinov, Shirley Temple Black, Tom Wolfe, Jeffrey Archer, Dominick Dunne, Nancy Sinatra, Martin Amis, and Joy Fielding, who made it a point to include the Book Cellar store on their itinerary, sometimes to autograph their books and sometimes just to check out other author's works. Nevertheless, Bruner insisted that all of her customers were to be looked after with the same cerebral service by her charming and well-educated staff. Bruner's employees were also notable. Two well-known Canadian authors, playwright John Krizanc and novelist and the late screenwriter Paul Quarrington, worked several years at The Book Cellar, while Toronto Star journalist and CBC broadcaster Joey Slinger lent a helping hand from time to time.

In 1987, Bruner worked together with several other Toronto area retail bookstore owners in lobbying the Ontario government to allow retail bookstores be allowed to open Sundays. After much pressure from retailers and consumers alike, the Rae government finally passed the legislation in June 1992, to permit Sunday shopping in Ontario.

Bruner closed the Book Cellar down in November 1997. Like hundreds of other Canadian owned independent bookstores, the Book Cellar succumbed to the pressure of the publishers imposing ever-stricter credit limits while facing serious price competition and lost traffic to the superstore and fledgling internet book retailers.

== Antiques and later life ==
Bruner took little time off after closing the Book Cellar before she quickly found herself another outlet in retailing, dealing in Antiques. It was a natural fit, considering Bruner's zeal for dealing with the public, combined with her knowledge and experience with antique furnishings and artwork. Bruner had been purchasing antiques for her personal collection since 1971. For nearly a decade since, Bruner has worked in several prestigious antique shops and art galleries throughout Toronto.

In August 2009, Bruner was diagnosed with a Glioblastoma multiforme brain tumor. After battling the cancer for nearly three months, Bruner died with her family at her side, on December 18, 2009, at Toronto's Sunnybrook Hospital.
