= All of You (Julio Iglesias and Diana Ross song) =

Single by Julio Iglesias and Diana Ross

from the album 1100 Bel Air Place and the album Swept Away
- B-side: "The Last Time"
- Released: June 12, 1984
- Recorded: 1984
- Genre: Pop, adult contemporary
- Length: 3:57
- Label: Columbia/CBS Records and RCA Records
- Songwriters: Cynthia Weil (lyrics writer); Julio Iglesias, Tony Renis (joint music composers)
- Producer: Richard Perry

Julio Iglesias singles chronology
"Forever and Ever" (1983)	"All of You" (1984)	"Me va, me va" (1984)

Diana Ross singles chronology
"Let's Go Up" (1983)	"All of You" (1984)	"Swept Away" (1984)

"All of You" is a 1984 vocal duet between Spanish singer and songwriter Julio Iglesias and American singer Diana Ross, which was released on June 12 as the lead single from both Iglesias's album 1100 Bel Air Place, released on the Columbia Records label, and Ross's fifteenth album, Swept Away (1984), released on the RCA Records label. It was written by Cynthia Weil, Iglesias and Tony Renis, and produced by Richard Perry.

== Background to the partnership ==
In the middle 1980s, having already achieved a high level of international prominence, Spanish singer Julio Iglesias was seeking to gain a foothold in American music; to this end, he had learned English. On his album 1100 Bel Air Place, he had already recorded a cover version of "The Air That I Breathe" in duet partnership with the Beach Boys and an original selection, "To All The Girls I've Loved Before," in duet partnership with Willie Nelson. Richard Perry, the album's music producer, suggested the idea of Iglesias having Diana Ross as yet another duet partner, and Iglesias agreed.

To the extent which became public knowledge, Iglesias and Ross had never met each other, least of all performed together, before becoming duet partners on the selection; Iglesias's and Ross's meeting when the video was being produced is believed to have been their first. That would soon change as Ross reportedly ended up spending the Christmas holiday season at Iglesias's Miami estate. They there celebrated the success of their global duet that hit #1 in Spain, #3 in Italy, and #8 in Canada for example. In the United States, it reached #12 in Cash Box and #19 in Billboard. Additionally, "All of You" reached #2 on Adult Contemporary radio. Because it was the second single from 1100 Bel Air Place and the first single from Diana's successful Swept Away album, it helped sell both artists's albums. It also boasted a hugely popular and sensual music video.

Ross was having some career difficulties at the time she agreed to the duet partnership with Iglesias; she had left Motown Records over a dispute with Berry Gordy which would not be resolved for years, and was recording for RCA Records (EMI in the UK and the rest of the world) at the time. Though her debut album for the label, Why Do Fools Fall In Love, had been successful three years before, her most recently released album, Ross, was not performing as well.

Iglesias collaborated with one of his "amigos", Tony Renis, on the composition of the music; veteran songwriter Cynthia Weil, better known for her partnership with Barry Mann, wrote the lyrics, which were in English—a language Iglesias could barely speak at the time. Richard Perry served as music producer.

== Charts ==
=== Weekly charts ===
Chart (1984)	Peak position
Australia (Kent Music Report)	19
Austria (Ö3 Austria Top 40)	12
Belgium (Ultratop 50 Flanders)	9
Canada Top Singles (RPM)	8
Europe (European Hot 100 Singles)	26
Finland (Suomen virallinen lista)	28
France (SNEP)	27
France (IFOP)	23
Italy (Musica e dischi)	3
New Zealand (Recorded Music NZ)	10
Netherlands (Dutch Top 40)	7
Netherlands (Single Top 100)	7
South Africa (Springbok Radio)	19
Spain (Promusicae)	1
UK Singles (Official Charts)	43
US Billboard Hot 100	19
US Hot R&B/Hip-Hop Songs (Billboard)	38
US Adult Contemporary (Billboard)	2
US Cash Box Top 100	12
West Germany (GfK)	32

=== Year-end charts ===
Chart (1984)	Position
Australia (Kent Music Report)	85
Belgium (Ultratop Flanders)	59
Netherlands (Dutch Top 40)	75
Netherlands (Single Top 100)	99
US Adult Contemporary (Billboard)	23

== Certifications ==
Region	Certification	Certified units/sales
Canada (Music Canada)	Gold	50,000^{^}
^{^} Shipments figures based on certification alone.
