= Your Move (disambiguation) =

Your Move is an album by America.

Your Move may also refer to:

- "Your Move" (song), title track from the album
- "Your Move", the first part of the song "I've Seen All Good People" by Yes
- Your Move, a UK estate agent, part of Lending Solutions

== See also ==
- It's Your Move (disambiguation)
