= The Paupers =

Canadian psychedelic rock band (1965–1968)

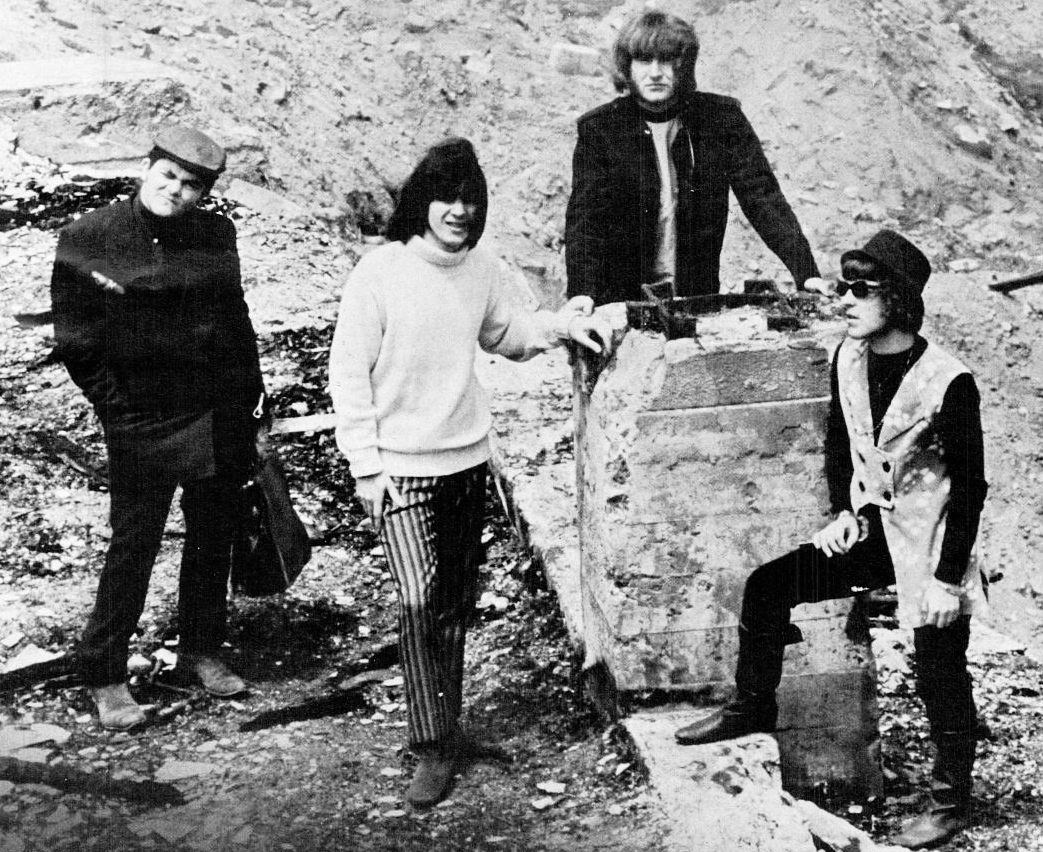
- The Paupers in 1967

Background information
- Origin: Canada
- Genres: Psychedelic rock
- Years active: 1965–1968
- Label: Verve Forecast

The Paupers were a Canadian psychedelic rock band from Toronto, Ontario, who recorded between 1965 and 1968. They released two albums for Verve Forecast Records and appeared at the Monterey International Pop Festival.

== History ==
=== Origins ===
The group was formed as The Spats in Toronto during 1964 by ex-Riverside Three drummer Skip Prokop (born Ronald Harry Prokop; 1943–2017) and rhythm guitarist/vocalist Bill Marion a.k.a. Bill Misener (1946–2014). The other original members comprised lead guitarist Chuck Beal (b. 1944) and bass player Denny Gerrard (b. 1947).

According to legend, The Spats rehearsed for 40 hours a week, sometimes on a 13-hour-a-day shift, and as a result became one of Toronto's tightest acts. After changing their name to The Paupers in early 1965, the group attracted the attention of local manager Duff Roman, who signed them to Toronto's independent label Red Leaf. In March 1965, the label issued Prokop and Marion's "Never Send You Flowers" as the group's debut single and it soon became a modest local hit, as did the follow-up "If I Told My Baby". During August, the group appeared at the Canadian National Exhibition's under 21 club with David Clayton-Thomas & The Shays.

As 1966 dawned, the band signed a new deal with Duff Roman's label Roman Records which issued the group's next single "For What I Am". A cover of "Long Tall Sally" followed in the spring of 1966, by which point the group had parted with Roman (who subsequently became program director of CKFH) and signed up with Bernie Finkelstein (later Bruce Cockburn's longstanding manager). However, shortly after a show at the El Patio on July 24, 1966, Marion left and subsequently recorded a solo single before moving into production work and playing with The Last Words.

=== Touring ===
In his place, The Paupers recruited Scottish émigré Adam Mitchell (b. 1944) from the CommonFolk (a folk group featuring Doug Bush, Ian Rankin, and Bruce Whitehead). Mitchell quickly asserted himself as the group's new lead singer and chief songwriter with Skip Prokop, and debuted with the band at the Broom and Stone in Scarborough on August 14, 1966.

Finkelstein signed the new line-up to New York City label MGM shortly afterwards and on September 24 the group made an appearance at a 14-hour pop music show held at Toronto's Maple Leaf Gardens, featuring 14 top local bands. The following month, on October 2, the band supported Wilson Pickett at the Club Kingsway in Toronto. On December 11, The Paupers (together with Ottawa band, The Children) supported The Lovin' Spoonful at Toronto's Maple Leaf Gardens.

The group's live reputation began to spread and in early 1967, Bob Dylan's manager, Albert Grossman, convinced Finkelstein to sell his interests in the group. Grossman re-negotiated the MGM contract and signed the band to its associate label Verve Forecast. The group's debut single with Mitchell, "If I Call You By Some Name" was released and reached No. 31 on Canada's RPM chart.

The single was followed by a well-received appearance at New York's Cafe Au Go Go from February 21 to March 5, 1967, supporting Jefferson Airplane. The group remained in the city to cut its debut album with Rick Shorter, played another concert opening for Jefferson Airplane at Hunter College in New York City, and then set out for a series of concerts on the West Coast including several appearances at San Francisco's Fillmore Auditorium and the Monterey International Pop Festival on June 16.

=== Debut album ===
Back in Toronto in late summer, MGM issued the single "Magic People", which was followed by an album of the same name. MGM then sent the group on a $40,000 promotional tour where they played 17 US cities in a month. The tour included an appearance at New York's Cafe Au Go Go opening for Cream, scheduled for September 28–October 1 (but cut short due to faulty equipment) and headlining at the Grande Ballroom in Detroit with The MC5 in support on November 3–5, 1967.

In November 1967, The Paupers' debut album, Magic People, peaked at US No. 178, but its modest success was overshadowed by Denny Gerrard's departure in early 1968. His replacement was bassist/vocalist Brad Campbell from Marion's previous group The Last Words. Around the same time, The Paupers also added (for live purposes) former BTB4 keyboard player Peter Sterbach, who quit after a month.

In January 1968, a final single "Think I Care" was lifted from The Paupers' debut album, but it failed to chart. Prokop started to grow restless and was soon drawn into the lucrative session world; he duly appeared on Peter, Paul & Mary's single "I Dig Rock And Roll" and Richie Havens' album Something Else amongst others.

The band continued to play high-profile dates and on February 24, supported The Jimi Hendrix Experience and The Soft Machine at the CNE Coliseum in Toronto. This was followed by a second US tour.

=== Break-up ===
During July, the group added John Ord (b. 1945) from The Fraser Loveman Group and The Nuclear Tricycle on keyboards, who debuted with the band at the Grande Ballroom in Detroit early the following month.

Internal problems, however, continued to dog the band. Following a final date at New York's Electric Circus running from August 29 to September 1, Prokop left to form Lighthouse, while Campbell joined Janis Joplin's Kozmic Blues Band.

The band's second album Ellis Island was released in the aftermath of the group's break up. A final single, Mitchell's "Cairo Hotel" (later recorded by McKendree Spring), was released simultaneously, but failed to chart.

=== Playing to pay off debts ===
In October, a new line-up of The Paupers featuring Mitchell, Beal, Ord, and original bass player Denny Gerrard (who had played with McKenna Mendelson Mainline in the interim) was formed to pay off the existing debt. Roz Parks (b. 1945) from Edward Bear and Magic Circus completed the lineup, which debuted at the Night Owl in Toronto on October 26–27 and continued to play locally to positive reviews.

Gerrard, however, soon left followed by Mitchell in April 1969. The remaining members brought in James Houston (b. 1946), who had previously played with Parks in the Magic Circus, and bass player Mel O'Brien, and returned to the local club scene. Later that year, the Houston-led line up returned to the Night Owl for a show running from August 7 to 8 but broke up later that month.

=== Post-Paupers ===
Mitchell briefly embarked upon a solo career, playing the folk circuit in Ontario and then worked as a producer for McKenna Mendelson Mainline, The Manhattan Transfer, and Linda Ronstadt. Gerrard joined Luke & The Apostles briefly before forming Jericho in March 1970. Beal worked as a record producer and manager, and was last heard of working at the Canadian National Institute for the Blind, producing a talking book series. Ord's band backed Chuck Berry in the summer of 1969. Houston formed his own eponymous band, and worked with Parks and Gerrard in Tranquillity Base.

Skip Prokop formed brass rock band Lighthouse in 1969 in Toronto.

== Discography ==
=== Singles ===
- "Never Send You Flowers"/"Sooner Than Soon" (Red Leaf 65002) 1965
- "If I Told My Baby"/"Like You Like Me" (Red Leaf 65003) 1965
- "For What I Am"/"Free as a Bird" (Roman 1103) 1965
- "Long Tall Sally"/"Sooner Than Soon" (Roman 1111) 1966
- "If I Call You By Some Name"/"Copper Penny" (Verve Folkway 5033) 1966 (CAN No. 31)(No. 6 CHUM)
- "Simple Deed"/"Let Me Be" (Verve Forecast 5043) 1967 (CAN No. 21)
- "One Rainy Day"/"Tudor Impressions" (Verve Forecast 5056) 1967
- "Magic People"/"Black Thank You Package" (Verve Forecast 5062) 1967
- "Think I Care"/"White Song" (Verve Folkway 5074) 1968
- "Cairo Hotel"/"Another Man's Hair on My Razor" (Verve Forecast 518007) 1968
- "South Down Road"/"Numbers" (Verve Forecast 518 908) 1968

=== Albums ===
- Magic People (Verve Forecast FTS-3026) 1967

Side one

1. "Magic People" – 2:43
2. "It's Your Mind" – 5:20
3. "Black Thank You Package" – 3:12
4. "Let Me Be" – 3:10
5. "Think I Care" – 3:55

Side two

1. "One Rainy Day" – 2:20
2. "Tudor Impressions" – 4:13
3. "Simple Deed" – 2:43
4. "My Love Hides Your View" – 3:20
5. "You And Me" – 2:40
- Ellis Island (Verve Forecast FTS-3051) 1968

Side one

1. "South Down Road" – 8:30
2. "Cairo Hotel" – 4:10
3. "Can't Go On" – 3:35
4. "Another Man's Hair On My Razor" – 4:15

Side two

1. "Numbers" – 5:33
2. "Oh That She Might" – 4:56
3. "Yes I Know" – 6:23
4. "Ask Her Again" – 4:00
5. "Juliana" – 2:49

=== Compilation albums ===
- Magic People (Edsel Records DED 253) 1989

== Sources ==
- "...It's the Toronto Sound", Toronto Daily Star, April 1, 1967, page 27
- Toronto's Paupers come home", Toronto Daily Star, September 16, 1967, page 24
- "Ellis Island: a whole new world", Toronto Telegram's After Four section, October 19, 1968, page 5
- Toronto Telegram's After Four section on Thursdays lists live dates
- Notes from Underfoot review of Cafe Au Go Go concert by Richard Goldstein for the Village Voice March 9, 1967
