= If I Call You By Some Name =

Single by The Paupers
- B-side: "Copper Penny"
- Released: 1966
- Genre: pop
- Length: 2:50
- Label: Verve Folkways KF 5033
- Songwriter(s): Rick Shorter
- Producer(s): Rick Shorter

The Paupers singles chronology
""Long Tall Sally""	"If I Call You By Some Name"	""Simple Deed""

If I Call You By Some Name was a hit for the Canadian rock group The Paupers. The song which was composed by Rick Shorter was released in 1966. It was the biggest hit that the band had.

== Background ==
The song is a mellow folk-influenced tune. It was composed, produced, and by Rick Shorter. He also produced and arranged the B-side, which was written by Adam Mitchell and Skip Prokop. The single was released on Verve Folkways in December, 1966.

In December 1966 Billboard announced that the single was predicted to reach the Hot 100 Chart. It was announced in the January 21, 1967 issue of Billboard that the record had already broken out as a hit in Canada. It made it to No. 31 on Canada’s RPM chart In January, 1967, the song peaked at No. 6 on Toronto's influential radio station CHUM (AM).

Because they had success with "If I Call You By Some Name", opportunities were opened for the group. They recorded their debut album, Magic People, and got to play at the Whisky a Go Go and Fillmore West. There was also a demand for a follow-up single, so the group released "Simple Deed" b/w "Let Me Be", both which were composed by Adam Mitchell and Skip Prokop.

According to The Great Canadian Book of Lists by Randy Ray and Mark Kearney, the group was not very proud of the song. But in the late 1960s it went down very well as the ultimate close-dancing song when they played high school dances in Toronto. The Paupers were a psychedelic group, and the folk-influenced song was their most mellow.
