= Magic People =

Studio album by The Paupers
- Released: July 1, 1967
- Recorded: April 4 – May 4, 1967
- Studios: CBS 30th Street Studio, New York City
- Genres: Psychedelic rock; psychedelic pop
- Label: Verve Forecast
- Producer: Rick Shorter

The Paupers chronology
Magic People (1967)	Ellis Island (1968)

Magic People is the debut album by the Canadian rock group The Paupers. It was produced by Rick Shorter and it made it to 178 on the U.S. charts.

== Background ==
Prior to working with Rick Shorter on the album, the group's single "If I Call You By Some Name" bw "Copper Penny" was produced by him. He wrote the A side, which became a hit in Canada in January 1967. The single reached number 6 on Toronto’s CHUM chart with single sales reaching 35,000. This raised their profile, and after playing at the Café au Go Go, they attracted the right attention. An album deal was promptly struck with the Verve record label, initially on their Verve Folkways imprint and ultimately Verve Forecast. The group stayed in New York City from late April to early May 1967 and over the course of two sessions at Columbia's 30th Street studio on April 27 and May 4 recorded an album's worth of songs with Shorter producing, which included "Magic People", "Think I Care" and the B-side "White Song". A re-recording of "If I Call You By Some Name" and the outtake "Love and Racing" from these sessions remain unissued.

The finished product which was released on July 1, 1967, was produced and arranged by Rick Shorter with help from The Paupers and under the production supervision of Jerry Schoenbaum and John Court.

== Release ==
Both mono and stereo versions of the album were released on vinyl in 1967. The album would peak at number 178 in the U.S. charts.

The album was released on CD in 2008 by Pacemaker Entertainment with additional tracks.

== Track listing ==
All songs written by Adam Mitchell and Skip Prokop.

Side A

1. "Magic People" - 2:43
2. "It's Your Mind" - 5:20
3. "Black Thank You Package" - 3:12
4. "Let Me Be" - 3:10
5. "Think I Care" - 3:55

Side B

6. "One Rainy Day" - 2:20
7. "Tudor Impressions" - 4:13
8. "Simple Deed" - 2:43
9. "My Love Hides Your View" - 3:20
10. "You And Me" - 2:40

== Personnel ==
- Adam Mitchell - lead vocals, rhythm guitar, organ on "You and Me"
- Skip Prokop - drums, percussion, backing vocals
- Chuck Beal - lead guitar
- Dennis Gerrard - bass, backing vocals

The group biography which appears in the original sleeve notes mentions that "Skip [Prokop] and Adam [Mitchell] do the lead singing"; while Prokop indeed performed occasional lead vocals for the group, all the lead vocals on Magic People were performed by Mitchell.

== Singles ==
Title	Release info	Year	Notes
"One Rainy Day" / "Tudor Impressions"	Verve Forecast KF 5056	1967	
"Magic People" / "Black Thank You Package"	Verve Forecast KF 5062	1967	
"Think I Care" / "White Song"	Verve Folkways KF 5074	1968	
