= The Record (magazine) =

Canadian magazine

- Editor: David Farrell (1981–1991); Martin Melhuish (1991–1993); Steve McLean (1993–2001)
- Categories: Music magazine
- Frequency: Weekly
- First issue: 13 July 1981
- Final issue Number: 9 August 1999 (print); March 2001 (online) vol 18 no 48.5 (print)
- Company: David Farrell and Associates
- Country: Canada
- Language: English
- ISSN: 0712-8290

The Record was a Canadian music industry magazine that featured record charts, trade news and opinions.

== History ==
David Farrell launched the publication in mid-1981, continuing its printed version until August 1999 when The Record continued as a website-based publication. The singles and albums chart featured in the magazine were featured as the Canadian lists in the Hits of the World section in Billboard. The charts were also published in newspapers via The Canadian Press and used in now-defunct chart shows like Countdown Canada, Canadian Countdown, and the Hot 30 Countdown.

The Record featured the following charts:

- Retail Singles (1983–1996)
- The Hits (1996–1997) - an all-format radio airplay chart
- Contemporary Hit Radio
- Pop Adult (also Adult Contemporary)
- Country
- Contemporary Album Radio (also Album-Oriented Rock)
- Hot AC - beginning in the late-1990s
- Top Albums

The airplay charts were based on reports from radio stations across the country from 1983 to 1997, when data from Nielsen Broadcast Data Systems was first employed. From 1995 to 1997, the airplay charts were compiled from computer-generated playlists that were submitted to The Record. The sales charts (Retail Singles, and Top Albums) were based on manual reports from retailers and distributors across the country. In 1996, point-of-sales data from Nielsen SoundScan was first used to compile the Top Albums chart. The magazine also published the rotational playlist from MuchMusic, and the chart from the CBC television show Video Hits.

On March 10, 2000, The Record was bought by musicmusicmusic (m3).

== Closure ==
In March 2001, shortly after the demise of competing publication RPM (February 1964 - November 2000), Farrell announced the complete shutdown of The Record. The demise was blamed on insufficient advertising and online subscription revenues. The Record editor Steve McLean began the Canadian Music Network publication in May of that year. With help from Gary Slaight's Slaight Foundation, David Farrell began FYI Music News in 2008.

As of 2023, there is no digital archive of this publication.
