= Rick Shorter =

American musician and author (1934–2017)

- Born: Herbert Richard Shorter; May 1, 1934
- Died: September 1, 2017 (aged 83) California, U.S.
- Genres: Folk; rock; R&B
- Instruments: Guitar; vocals
- Labels: Big Top; Columbia; MGM; Traffic Records
- Formerly of: Rick and Lance; Rick and Gwen

Rick Shorter (May 1, 1934 – September 1, 2017) was an American songwriter, music producer, and author. During the 1960s when he was most active, he produced and arranged for a multitude of artists. They include Ciska Peters, Big Dee Irwin, and Galt MacDermot. His compositions have been covered by Ola & the Janglers, The Five Tornados, Johnny And The Hurricanes, The Liverbirds, The Esquires, Gene Pitney and Burl Ives. He also composed, arranged, and produced "If I Call You By Some Name" which was a hit for The Paupers. In the 1970s, Shorter returned to his faith and, along with his wife Gwen became very active in the Seventh-day Adventist church from which he had drifted away over prior years.

== Background ==
The son of a clergyman who used to be a jazz guitarist, Shorter came from a Seventh-day Adventist background. By the time he was ten years old, he was singing professionally at gospel camps. He also had his own local radio show while still at junior high. His cousin is jazz saxophonist, Wayne Shorter, founding member of the group Weather Report.

=== Family ===
Shorter met his wife Gwen née Simmons in a New York night club on 42nd Street. She was an R&B, soul singer, actress and model. He became her manager. By July 1972 they were engaged.

== Early years ==
=== Rick & Lance ===
In the early 1960s, he was a member of a duo called Rick & Lance which consisted of himself and Lance Lehmberg. They played mainly at Greenwich Village. Their first single "Where The Four Winds Blow" bw "Good Buddy" was released in the U.S. on the Bigtop label in 1962. It was also released on the Atlantic label in Japan that year. The following year they released Laura Lee" bw "They Hanged A Certain Man", and later another single, "Evaleena Roll 'Em" bw "Roses And Orchids". "They Hanged A Certain Man" appeared on the Doo-Bop-Jivers, Volume 7 CD album compilation which also featured The Mint Juleps, The Hi-Liters and The Five Keys. Their other recordings have also been included on re-releases of Twirl Records recordings. Their single "Where The Four Winds Blow" was a hit in Japan.

=== Rick & Lance discography ===
Singles
Title	Release info	Year	Notes
"Where The Four Winds Blow" / "Good Buddy"	Bigtop 45-3105	1962	
"Laura Lee" / "They Hanged A Certain Man"	Bigtop 45-3133	1963	
"Evaleena Roll 'Em" / "Roses And Orchids"	Bigtop 45-3157	1963	

== Rick Shorter career ==
=== 1960s to 1990s ===
In the October 2, 1965, edition of Billboard, it was reported that Shorter who at the time was contracted to Columbia Records, had signed an exclusive writing contract with the Edward B. Marks Music Corp. On April 16, 1966, Shorter was to appear at the New York Community College with Godfrey Cambridge to perform three of his own compositions which were published by E.B. Marks. He was also on the road a week later promoting his new single "Last Thoughts Of A Young Man". In October 1966, the Gene Pitney single "Backstage" was climbing up the UK charts with Shorter's blues rocker "Blue Color" as the B side. Also in the same month, Cashbox had announced that he had renewed his contract with E.B. Marks. He had also written and produced "Love Hides A Multitude of Sins" for The Esquires. His two songs "Funky Butt Hall" and "The Hard Road Back" were due for release. They were released on Columbia single 4-43881 in December 1966.

By 1973, he was back with the Seventh-day Adventist church and had left his career in popular music.

=== 2000s ===
In 2002 some songs were released. One was "9/11 Memorial Song (Should'a Been Home By Now)" which featured his daughter Hope; Christian Shorter played guitar. In 2009, "They Called Me G I Joe" was released through Appropriate Records.

=== Rick Shorter discography ===
Singles
Title	Release info	Year	Notes
"Don't Cry" / "Can You Tell Me What Town I'm In?"	Columbia 4-43406	1965	
"City Women" / "Last Thoughts Of A Young Man"	Columbia 4-43571	1966	
"The Hard Road Back" / "Funky Butt Hall"	Columba 4-43881	1966	
"Since Half Past Five" / "Blessed Are The Meek"	MGM K13875	1967	

== Compositions, production and management ==
=== The Paupers ===
Shorter composed a mellow folk-influenced tune called "If I Call You By Some Name" for The Paupers. He also produced and arranged another song for the group, Copper Penny by group members Adam Mitchell and Skip Prokop. The single was released on Verve Folkways KF 5033 in December, 1966. Also in the same month, Billboard announced that the single was predicted to reach the Hot 100 Chart. In January, 1967, the single had already broken out as a hit in Canada. It reached No. 31 on Canada's RPM chart. In January, 1967, the song peaked at #6 on Toronto's influential radio station CHUM (AM). Around March 1967, Shorter produced the debut album Magic People for The Paupers, which they had recorded in New York. The quality of Shorter's production work for the album was recognized by Hi-Fi Review magazine. The album spent 2 weeks in the charts peaking at no 178.

=== Galt MacDermot ===
In 1964 Galt MacDermot had relocated to New York from Canada. He first met Shorter through some connections he had. Shorter needed a ska tune for Woody Herman. At the time one of Shorter's roles was gathering studio musicians to record tunes for music publishers. Having heard MacDermot's piano playing and liking it, he used him to cut demos. The Manhattan musicians introduced to MacDermot by Shorter would become his studio co-musicians over the next few years. Also through Shorter, MacDermot met and got to play with Bernard Purdie. In 1968, his album Hair Pieces was released. Shorter produced and directed the music on the album and also contributed to some of the sound effects.

=== Jackie Follett ===
Shorter produced and arranged two singles for Jackie Follett. One was "That's A Good Enough Reason" b/w (backed with) "There's A Moment". The A side was composed by Shorter, and the B side was by Follett. It was released on Verve Folkways KF5034 in 1966. It was also released on the M.G.M. Special Products label, cat no. KF 5034. The second single "Am What I Am" b/w "Don't Care To" was a double Shorter composition and released on Verve Forecast KF5065 in 1967.

=== Street and TCB ===
Street was a rock group which was fronted by singer Anya Cohen. In addition to managing the group, Shorter also wrote some of their material. Cohen was operating a coffee shop in Rochester, New York called the Wee Spot Coffee Shop when she was discovered by Shorter. He set her up with musicians that consisted of guitarists John Williamson and Will Betz. bassist Michael Lynne, percussionist Alan Camarda and drummer Thomas Chamon. Their single "There's One Kind Favor" by "Boeing 707" was due for release in May 1968. The single credited to Anya's Street was released on Verve Forecast KF5084. The B side "Boeing 707" was composed by Shorter. Their self-titled album was released that year on Verve Forecast FTS-3057. It included 5 Shorter compositions. They released one more single in 1969 on the Traffic Records label, "Apollo... Amen" bw "Why Concern Yourself". Shorter composed both songs as well as producing and arranging the recordings. Traffic Records was owned by Shorter and Barry Lane. They had entered into a deal in 1969 with RCA to distribute their recordings in Canada. This included songs by Street and another group named TCB. Shorter also managed TCB. The band was previously called Magic and their name was changed due to other groups having similar names. He produced their album Open For Business which was released in 1970 on the Traffic label. Colleen Peterson was with the group and died in 1996. Shorter had done some production work in 1967 for another band Peterson later joined called 3's A Crowd; that band was Canadian and Shorter produced three songs which they recorded at Bell Studios.

=== Other work ===
In 1968, Shorter was the musical director for the Broadway musical, Hair.

In the December 23, 1969 issue of Billboard, it was announced that Shorter and Ashram Associates were producing a one nighter gospel show that was to feature Rev. James Cleveland, The Mighty Clouds of Joy, Shirley Caesar, Rev. Cleophus Robinson, Jessy Dixon and the Chicago Community Singers, and others.

He wrote the song "Don't Cry" which was released around 1970 or 1971 on the Lionel Records label. The singer was Gwen Simmons who would later become his wife.

== Return to the Seventh-day Adventist church ==
Having returned to the church at some point during the 1970s, Shorter thought he could transform some rock and soul songs into gospel music, but he realized there couldn't be any compromise with worldly music. Having turned his back on the popular music industry, Shorter who had been acquainted to artists such as Janis Joplin, Jimi Hendrix etc., reflected on the scene he had left behind. He warned young people that there was absolutely nothing to that kind of life. Olga Soler was a woman who would end up working for Shorter in his restaurant. She was a former Hair cast member. She was auditioning for a part in an off-Broadway rock musical. Knowing that it wasn't a God friendly scene, Shorter was praying for her that she would leave it behind. Having heard nothing for a few weeks, she went to Tennessee with the intention of coming back in time to do some work for Batten Barton Durstine and Osborne, an advertising company. The day after she left, someone from the off Broadway musical contacted the restaurant to say that she had landed the lead role. Shorter never passed the info on to her, and later as a Christian she recounted this and said that she was glad he didn't, as she didn't know how things would have turned out.

In the early 1970s, the Shorters ran a vegetarian health food store and restaurant called The Beautiful Way, which was located in New York's Greenwich Village. In 1973 they were speaking at Adventist conventions. As lay evangelists, they held a week of prayer and they spoke to young people at a Detroit Center church. They also performed some devotional songs.

After living in New York for 35 years, Shorter and his wife moved to Southern California where they published religious and health related material. He wrote the book Nine Months Pregnant; it is mainly about the ordination of women in the Adventist Church and looks at the possibility of the church being affected by the change.

== Publications ==
List
Title	Author	Release info	ISBN	Year	Notes
Shorter's Health Manual, Vegan Raw Recepies	Gwen & Rick Shorter	Homeward Publishing	ISBN 0938805169	2001	
Thy Nakedness, Lord What Shall I Wear	Gwen & Rick Shorter	Homeward Publishing	ISBN 0938805061	1993	
Jewelry, The Spiritualism Connection: Ornaments	Gwen & Rick Shorter	Homeward Publishing	ISBN 0938805185	1997	
Nine Months Pregnant--The Seventh-day Adventist Church: A Women's Ordination Allegory	Rick Shorter	Homeward Publishing	ISBN 978-0-938805-22-9	2015	
Seventh-Day Adventists Believe What?	Rick & Gwen Shorter	Homeward Publishing	ISBN 978-1-483586-40-3	2016	

== Death ==
Rick Shorter suffered a basilar artery stroke in August 2017, and died on September 1, 2017. His funeral was held at Central Filipino Seventh-day-Adventist Church in Los Angeles on September 10.
