= Ross (1983 album) =

Studio album by Diana Ross
- Released: June 9, 1983
- Recorded: 1982–1983
- Studio: Soundworks (New York City); Mediasound (New York City); Power Station (New York City); Sound City (Los Angeles); The Village (Los Angeles); Ameracyan (Hollywood)
- Genre: R&B; adult contemporary; post-disco; soul
- Length: 35:50
- Label: Capitol (Europe); RCA (North America)
- Producer: Gary Katz; Diana Ross; Ray Parker Jr.

Diana Ross chronology
Silk Electric (1982)	Ross (1983)	Swept Away (1984)

Singles from Ross
- 1. "Pieces of Ice" Released: June 17, 1983; 2. "Up Front" Released: September 9, 1983; 3. "Let's Go Up" Released: November 18, 1983

Professional ratings
Review scores
Source	Rating
AllMusic	2/5 stars
The Rolling Stone Album Guide	(unfavorable)

Ross is the fourteenth studio album by American R&B singer Diana Ross, released on June 9, 1983, by RCA Records. It was Ross' third of six albums released by the label during the decade. It was released shortly before Ross gave a pair of free concerts in New York's Central Park. The album peaked at No. 32 on the US charts, No. 14 on the US R&B charts and No. 44 in the UK. The album's highest international chart position was in Sweden, where it reached No. 7.

Five of the eight tracks were produced by Gary Katz, two by Ray Parker Jr. and one by Ross. The album's first single, "Pieces of Ice", peaked at No. 31 on the US charts. Subsequent singles "Up Front" (US R&B No. 60, UK No. 79) and "Let's Go Up" (US No. 77) – also recorded by Helen Reddy the same year – were also minor hits. "Up Front" was remixed by Jolley & Swain for its European release.

The album cut "You Do It" had previously been recorded by Sheena Easton and subsequently Rita Coolidge and Deborah Allen.

The album was remastered and re-released in September 2014 by Funky Town Grooves, as an "Expanded Edition" with bonus material.

== Track listing ==
Side A
No.	Title	Writer(s)	Length
1.	"That's How You Start Over"	Ed Sanford; Michael McDonald	4:12
2.	"Love Will Make It Right"	Donald Fagen	4:46
3.	"You Do It"	Deborah Allen; Eddie Struzick; Rafe Van Hoy	4:32
4.	"Pieces of Ice"	John Capek; Marc Jordan	4:58

Side B
No.	Title	Writer(s)	Length
5.	"Let's Go Up"	Franne Golde; Peters Ivers	4:06
6.	"Love or Loneliness"	Ray Parker Jr.	4:18
7.	"Up Front"	Ray Parker Jr.	4:00
8.	"Girls"	Bill Wray; Marc Jordan; Diana Ross	4:03

2014 expanded edition bonus tracks (Funky Town Grooves)
No.	Title	Length
9.	"Pieces of Ice" (7" Mix)	4:08
10.	"Pieces of Ice" (12" Mix)	7:16
11.	"Pieces of Ice" (12" Instrumental)	7:16
12.	"Up Front" (7" Radio Mix)	3:41
13.	"Up Front" (Special Club Mix)	7:00
14.	"Up Front" (12" Mix)	5:44
15.	"Up Front" (Tony Swain and Steve Jolley European 12" Remix)	5:43
16.	"Let's Go Up" (7" Mix)	3:14

== Personnel ==
Credits are adapted from the Ross liner notes.

- Diana Ross – lead vocals
- Michael McDonald – keyboards (1), backing vocals (1)
- Greg Phillinganes – keyboards (1–5), keyboard bass (4)
- Donald Fagen – synthesizers (2)
- David Paich – synthesizers (3, 5)
- Jullian Marshall – Hammond organ (3)
- Steve Porcaro – synthesizers (5)
- Ray Parker Jr. – acoustic piano (6, 7), synthesizers (6, 7), guitar (6, 7), bass (6, 7), drums (6, 7), backing vocals (6, 7), arrangements (6, 7)
- Rob Mounsey – Fender Rhodes (8)
- Ray Chew – acoustic piano (8)
- Jimmy Haslip – bass guitar (1–5)
- Steve Lukather – guitar (1)
- Domenic Troiano – guitar (1–5)
- Larry Carlton – guitar (3, 4)
- Joe Walsh – guitar (4)
- Randy Hall – guitar (7)
- Bob Kulick – lead guitar (8)
- Eric Gale – guitar (8)
- Jeff Mironov – guitar (8)
- Neil Jason – bass (8)
- Jeff Porcaro – drums (1–5)
- Yogi Horton – drums (8)
- Ollie E. Brown – percussion (6, 7)
- Jack Ashford – tambourine (7)
- Jerry Hey – horn arrangements (1), trumpet (4), flugelhorn (4), synthesizer arrangements (5)
- Jim Horn – saxophone (4), flute (4)
- Gene Page – strings (6)
- Clydie King – backing vocals (1, 3)
- Shirley Matthews – backing vocals (1, 3, 5)
- Myrna Matthews – backing vocals (5)
- Alex Brown – backing vocals (6, 7)
- Anita Sherman – backing vocals (6, 7)
- Arnell Carmichael – backing vocals (7)
- J.D. Nicholas – backing vocals (7)
- Valorie Jones – backing vocals (7)

== Production and artwork ==
- Producers – Gary Katz (Tracks 1–5); Ray Parker Jr. (Tracks 6 & 7); Diana Ross (Track 8)
- Engineers – Daniel Lazerus (Tracks 1–5); Ray Parker Jr. (Tracks 6 & 7); Larry Alexander (Track 8)
- Assistant Engineers – Robin Lane, Michael Morongell and Eddie Orsario (Tracks 1–5); Michael Christopher, Steve Hallquist and Steve Rinkoff (Tracks 6 & 7)
- Additional Overdubs (Tracks 1–5) – Andy Hoffman and Wayne Yurgelun
- Digital Technician (Tracks 1–5) – Wayne Yurgelun
- Vocal Engineer (Tracks 6 & 7) – Andy Hoffman
- Recorded at Soundworks Digital Audio/Video Studios, Mediasound and the Power Station (New York, NY); Sound City Studios and The Village Recorder (Los Angeles, CA); Ameraycan Studios (North Hollywood, CA)
- Tracks 1, 2, 3 & 5–8 mastered by Bob Ludwig at Masterdisk (New York, NY)
- Track 4 mastered by Ted Jensen at Sterling Sound (New York, NY)
- Cover Design – Ria Lewerke
- Photography – Uwe Ommer

== Charts ==
Chart (1983)	Peak position
Australia (Kent Music Report)	59
Canada Top Albums (RPM)	57
Finnish Albums (Suomen virallinen lista)	16
Germany (German Singles TOP 75)	34
UK Albums (OCC)	44
US Billboard 200	32
US Top R&B/Hip-Hop Albums (Billboard)	14
US Cashbox Top Pop Albums	27
