= Swept Away (Diana Ross album) =

Studio album by Diana Ross
- Released: September 13, 1984
- Recorded: 1984
- Studio: Unique Recording Studios (New York City)
- Genres: R&B; pop; dance
- Length: 43:38
- Label: RCA
- Producers: Diana Ross; Arthur Baker; Daryl Hall; James Anthony Carmichael; Lionel Richie; Bernard Edwards; Richard Perry; Ramón Arcusa

Diana Ross chronology
Ross (1983)	Swept Away (1984)	Eaten Alive (1985)

Singles from Swept Away
- 1. "All of You" Released: June 12, 1984; 2. "Swept Away" Released: August 14, 1984; 3. "Touch by Touch" Released: September 1984 (non-US); 4. "Missing You" Released: November 13, 1984

Professional ratings
Review scores
Source	Rating
AllMusic	3/5 stars

Swept Away is the fifteenth studio album by American R&B singer Diana Ross, released on September 13, 1984, by RCA Records in North America and by Capitol Records in Europe. It was Ross' fourth of six albums released by the label during the decade.

== Overview ==
This album yielded several hit singles, the most successful of which, "Missing You", became Ross' final top ten hit to date on the Billboard Hot 100, peaking at No. 10. It was produced by Lionel Richie and was a tribute to late soul singer Marvin Gaye, Ross and Richie's former Motown Records label-mate. Other singles included the Daryl Hall and Arthur Baker-produced "Swept Away" and the Julio Iglesias duet, "All of You". All three of these singles were accompanied by popular music videos.

The album also included the European single "Touch by Touch" which reached the top 10 in Austria, Belgium and Norway and also charting inside the top 20 in Canada, Sweden and the Netherlands. The US single "Telephone" – produced by Bernard Edwards of Chic – was directed at R&B radio and scored a No. 13 hit on the Billboard Hot R&B/Hip-Hop Songs chart. Edwards' Chic partner Nile Rodgers played guitar on the new wave song "It's Your Move".

The album included cover versions of Fontella Bass' 1960s R&B hit "Rescue Me" and the Bob Dylan song "Forever Young", which she performed as the finale to her 1987 ABC TV special, Diana Ross: Red Hot Rhythm and Blues.

Swept Away was certified gold by the end of 1984. It peaked at No. 26 on the Billboard Pop albums chart, also reaching No. 40 in the UK. The album also made the top ten in Norway, the Netherlands and Sweden. The highest chart position worldwide was in Norway, where the album reached No. 7 on the album chart.

== Re-release in 2014 ==
The album was remastered and re-released as an "Expanded Edition" on September 2, 2014 by Funky Town Grooves, with bonus material on a second CD.

== Track listing ==
Side A
No.	Title	Writer(s)	Length
1.	"Missing You"	Lionel Richie	4:05
2.	"Touch by Touch"	Arthur Barrow; Joe Esposito; Richie Zito	4:11
3.	"Rescue Me"	Raynard Miner; Carl Smith	2:41
4.	"It's Your Move"	Steve Kipner; Terry Shaddick	3:34
5.	"Swept Away"	Daryl Hall; Sara Allen; Ross (Note: Spoken word intro written by Diana Ross.)	5:23

Side B
No.	Title	Writer(s)	Length
1.	"Telephone"	Bernard Edwards; Denzil Miller	4:10
2.	"Nobody Makes Me Crazy Like You Do"	Robby Benson; Karla DeVito	4:20
3.	"All of You" (featuring Julio Iglesias)	Cynthia Weil; Iglesias; Tony Renis	4:02
4.	"We Are the Children of the World"	Mary Anne Kelly; Peppy Castro	4:24
5.	"Forever Young"	Bob Dylan	4:49
Total length:			43:38

2014 "Expanded Edition" CD2
No.	Title	Writer(s)	Length
1.	"Swept Away" (12" Long Version)	Diana Ross; Daryl Hall; Sara Allen	7:38
2.	"Swept Away" (12" Instrumental)	Ross; Hall; Allen	7:20
3.	"Swept Away" (7" Single Mix)	Ross; Hall; Allen	4:04
4.	"Touch by Touch" (12" Single Mix)	Arthur Barrow; Joe Esposito; Richie Zito	5:31
5.	"Touch by Touch" (12" Instrumental)	Barrow; Esposito; Zito	4:04
6.	"Touch by Touch" (Alternate Single Mix)	Barrow; Esposito; Zito	3:55
7.	"Telephone" (Edited Version)	Bernard Edwards; Denail Miller	3:48
8.	"Missing You" (7" Single Mix)	Lionel Richie	4:16
9.	"Fight for It (Touch By Touch B-Side)" (7" Single Version)	Ross; Bill Wray; Peppy Castro; Ray Chew	4:10

== Personnel ==
Credits are adapted from the Swept Away liner notes.

- Diana Ross – lead and backing vocals
- Arthur Baker – keyboards, synthesizers/Yamaha DX7
- Arthur Barrow – keyboards/Yamaha DX7, bass, arrangements (2)
- Jeff Beck – guitars
- Nile Rodgers – guitars
- G. E. Smith – guitars
- Bernard Edwards – bass
- John "JR" Robinson – drums (1)
- Dave Weckl – drums/Linn 9000
- Michael Brecker – saxophone
- Randy Brecker – trumpet
- Daryl Hall – backing vocals (5)
- Julio Iglesias – lead vocals (8)

== Production ==
- Producers – James Anthony Carmichael and Lionel Richie (Track 1); Diana Ross (Tracks 2–4, 7, 9 & 10); Arthur Baker and Daryl Hall (Track 5); Bernard Edwards (Track 6); Ramón Arcusa and Richard Perry (Track 8).
- Co-Producer on Track 8 – Albert Hammond
- Engineer – Larry Alexander
- Assistant Engineer – Dave Greenberg
- Mastered by Ted Jensen at Sterling Sound (New York, NY).
- Contractor – Sephra Herman
- Art Director – Ria Lewerke
- Design – Sue Reilly
- Photography – Francisco Scavullo

== Charts ==
=== Weekly charts ===
Chart (1984)	Peak position
Australian Albums (ARIA)	78
Canada Top Albums/CDs (RPM)	37
Dutch Albums (Album Top 100)	10
European Albums (Music & Media)	18
Finnish Albums (Suomen virallinen lista)	23
German Albums (Offizielle Top 100)	22
Italian Albums (Musica e dischi)	22
Japan (Oricon)	32
Norwegian Albums (VG-lista)	7
Swedish Albums (Sverigetopplistan)	10
UK Albums (Official Charts)	40
US Billboard 200	26
US Top R&B/Hip-Hop Albums (Billboard)	7
US Cashbox Top Pop Albums	21

=== Year-end charts ===
Chart (1985)	Position
US Billboard 200	43
US Top R&B/Hip-Hop Albums (Billboard)	22

== Certifications ==
Region	Certification	Certified units/sales
Canada (Music Canada)	Gold	50,000^{^}
United States (RIAA)	Gold	500,000^{^}
^{^} Shipments figures based on certification alone.

== See also ==
- Floral Shoppe, of which track "リサフランク420 / 現代のコンピュ" came into prominence as a vaporwave song that sampled Ross' "It's Your Move" extensively.
