= Swept Away (song) =

Single by Diana Ross

from the album Swept Away
- B-side: "Fight for It"; "We Are the Children of the World"
- Released: August 14, 1984
- Recorded: 1984
- Studio: Unique Recording Studios (New York City)
- Length: 5:25 (album version); 4:01 (single edit)
- Label: RCA
- Songwriters: Daryl Hall; Sara Allen
- Producers: Hall; Arthur Baker

Diana Ross singles chronology
| "All of You" (1984) | "Swept Away" (1984) | "Touch by Touch" (1984) |

Music video
- "Swept Away" on YouTube

"Swept Away" is a song by American R&B singer Diana Ross from her studio album of the same name. Ross released the song as the album's second single on August 14, 1984, by the RCA. It was written by Daryl Hall, Sara Allen and produced by Hall and Arthur Baker. Ross wrote the spoken lyrics at the beginning of the song and Hall also provided background vocals on it.

The song talked about how the narrator thought she was in love with a special person only to find out that she had just been "swept away" after catching her lover cheating on her sending her into a rage and panic.

Baker had been a club DJ turned remixer who was just breaking into production, and the twelve-inch version became one of Ross' most successful, reaching number one on the Billboard Dance/Disco chart and #3 on the Cash Box 12" singles sales chart. The single also reached nineteen on the US pop singles chart and number three on the R&B singles chart.

== Music video ==
In the sensual music video, directed by Dominic Orlando in Manhattan and on location in Long Island, Diana is seduced by a Frenchman and falls in love with him only to find out, after arriving unannounced in a bar, that he's cheating on her with another French girl in a stylized Apache Dance. She then confronts the man - hitting him repeatedly - who ends up being knocked unconscious by the singer. Later in the video, the Frenchman tries to fight his way back into her life only to have Ross push him from a lighthouse tower into the water. It was one of her most popular videos, and her first to air on MTV.

The music video was blown up to 35mm for projection during Diana Ross' live performances at Caesars Palace in Las Vegas. There's also an extended version of the video edited for the 12" dance club remix.

== Charts ==
Chart performance for "Swept Away"
| Chart (1984) | Peak position |
|---|---|
| Belgium (Ultratop 50 Flanders) | 28 |
| Canada Top Singles (RPM) | 17 |
| Netherlands (Dutch Top 40) | 36 |
| Netherlands (Single Top 100) | 36 |
| US Billboard Hot 100 | 19 |
| US Dance Club Songs (Billboard) | 1 |
| US Hot R&B/Hip-Hop Songs (Billboard) | 3 |
| West Germany (GfK) | 63 |

== Personnel ==
- Lead vocals by Diana Ross
- Background vocals by Daryl Hall and Diana Ross
- Guitar solo by Jeff Beck
- Produced by Daryl Hall and Arthur Baker

== See also ==
- List of Billboard number-one dance singles of 1984
