= 1100 Bel Air Place =

1984 studio album by Julio Iglesias

Coordinates: 34°05′39″N 118°26′40.5″W

Studio album by Julio Iglesias
- Released: 10 August 1984
- Recorded: 1983–1984
- Genre: Pop
- Length: 40:03
- Label: Columbia/CBS
- Producers: Richard Perry; Ramón Arcusa

Julio Iglesias chronology
Julio (1983)	1100 Bel Air Place (1984)	Libra (1985)

Singles from 1100 Bel Air Place
- 1. "To All the Girls I've Loved Before" Released: February 1984; 2. "All of You" Released: June 12, 1984

Professional ratings
Review scores
Source	Rating
Allmusic	3.5/5 stars

1100 Bel Air Place is a concept album of love songs largely composed by Albert Hammond, and performed by Spanish singer Julio Iglesias, released on 10 August 1984 by CBS Records internationally and by Columbia Records in the United States. It was the first of Iglesias' albums to be performed largely in English, and it is generally considered his breakthrough album in English-speaking markets.

The album features Iglesias' only US top-40 singles, "To All the Girls I've Loved Before", with Willie Nelson, and "All of You" with Diana Ross. The Beach Boys performed backing vocals on "The Air That I Breathe", a song from Albert Hammond's 1972 album It Never Rains in Southern California, which was also a major hit for the British band the Hollies in 1974. The album also features a re-working of Hammond's song "It Never Rains in Southern California", with new lyrics by Carole Bayer Sager and re-titled "Moonlight Lady", with an interpolation of the original song as an uncredited reprise at the track's conclusion.

The album's title is the address, 1100 Bel Air Place—Iglesias' former home in Los Angeles, which was owned by music producer Quincy Jones until September 2005.

== Promotion ==
To promote 1100 Bel Air Place, Julio Iglesias began a world tour on 15 June 1984 in Puerto Rico. The tour totaled 124 concerts throughout the United States, Canada, Europe, South Africa, Australia and the Orient. The tour was sponsored by Coca-Cola and sold around 1 million tickets.

== Track listing ==
No.	Title	Writer(s)	Length
1.	"All of You" (with Diana Ross)	Cynthia Weil; Julio Iglesias; Tony Renis	3:57
2.	"Two Lovers"	Paul Jabara; Jay Asher	4:23
3.	"Bambou Medley: Tape Sur Des Bambous; Jamaica"	Il Tape sur des Bambous: Michael Heron; Didier Barbelivien; Phillipe Lavil; Jamaica: Iglesias; Michel Colombier; Albert Hammond	3:48
4.	"The Air That I Breathe" (with The Beach Boys)	Hammond; Michael Hazelwood	4:16
5.	"The Last Time"	Iglesias; Manuel De La Calva; Ramón Arcusa; Panzer	3:36
6.	"Moonlight Lady"	Hammond; Carole Bayer Sager	4:10
7.	"When I Fall in Love"	Victor Young; Edward Heyman	3:27
8.	"Me Va, Me Va"	Ricardo Ceratto; Hammond (English Lyrics)	6:03
9.	"If (E Poi)"	David Gates; Testa (Italian Lyrics)	3:09
10.	"To All the Girls I've Loved Before" (with Willie Nelson)	Hammond; Hal David	3:30
Total length:			40:03

2006 reissue bonus track
No.	Title	Writer(s)	Length
11.	"I Don't Want to Wake You"	Peter McCann; Wayland Holyfield	2:56

== Personnel ==
Adapted from the 1100 Bel Air Place liner notes:

=== Performance credits ===
Vocals

- Julio Iglesias
- Diana Ross
- Willie Nelson
- The Beach Boys

Keyboards, Rhodes, Synthesizers

- Randy Kerber
- Michel Colombier
- Robbie Buchanan
- David Foster
- Greg Phillinganes
- James Newton Howard
- Rafael Ferro
- John Barnes
- John Van Tongeren
- Steve Mitchell
- Nicky Hopkins
- Michael Boddicker

Guitars

- Michael Landau
- David Williams
- Paul Jackson Jr.
- George Doering

Drums

- Carlos Vega

Bass

- Abraham Laboriel
- Nathan East
- Mike Porcaro
- Neil Stubenhaus

Percussion

- Paulinho da Costa
- Luis Conte
- Michael Fisher

Trumpets

- Jerry Hey
- Gary Grant
- Larry Hall
- Chuck Findley
- Charles Davis

Trombones

- Charles Loper
- Lew McCreary
- Dick Hyde
- Dick Nash
- Les Benedict
- Bill Reichenbach

French Horns

- Richard Todd
- Brad Warnaar

Background Vocals

- Tom Kelly
- Richard Page
- Steven George
- Richard Marx
- Kenny Cetera
- Julia Waters
- Maxine Waters
- Stephanie Spruill
- Alexandra Brown

Violins

- Gerald Vinci
- Assa Drori
- Arnold Belnick
- Isabelle Daskoff
- Henry Ferver
- Reg Hill
- Kathy Lenski
- Haim Shtrum
- Marshall Sosson
- Mary Tsumura
- Bobb Sushel
- Bob Sanov
- Bill Nuttycombe
- Joe Goodman
- Shari Zippert
- Stanley Plummer
- Bill Hymanson
- Sheldon Sanov

Viola

- Dave Schwartz
- Allan Harshman
- Stan Ackerman
- Virginia Majewski
- Marilyn Baker
- Garey Nuttycombe
- Myer Bello
- Pamela Goldsmith

Cello

- Fred Seydora
- Ray Kelley
- Douglas Davis
- Jacqueline Lustgarten
- Larry Corbett
- Ron Cooper
- David Speltz

Horns

- Erich Bulling

Saxophone solo

- Stan Getz ("When I Fall In Love")

=== Technical credits ===
- Richard Perry – producer
- Michel Colombier – arranger (tracks, strings)
- Randy Kerber – arranger (tracks, strings)
- Robbie Buchanan – arranger (tracks)
- Ramón Arcusa – arranger (tracks), producer
- John Barnes – arranger (tracks)
- Jeremy Lubbock – arranger (strings)
- Erich Bulling – arranger (horns)
- Jules Chaikin – contractor
- John Rosenberg – contractor
- Andres Victorin – copyist
- Art Von Schloss – copyist
- Suzie Katayama – copyist
- Humberto Gatica – engineer, mixer
- Terry Christian – engineer
- Gabe Veltri – additional engineer
- Bill Scheniman – additional engineer (Diana's voice)
- Larry Greenhill – additional engineer (Willie's voice)
- Stuart Furusho – additional engineer
- Tom Fource – additional engineer
- Larry Fergusson – additional engineer
- Michael Brooks – additional engineer
- David Dubow – assistant engineer
- Bobby Gerber – assistant engineer
- Wally Traugott – mastering engineer
- Albert Hammond – associate producer
- Harry Langdon – cover photos
- Javier Paz – design
- Julie Adams – dialect coach for the album
- Lillian Glass – dialect coach for ("To All The Girls I've Loved Before")

=== Recording and mixing locations ===
- Studio 55, Los Angeles – recording
- Sunset Sound, Los Angeles – recording, mixing
- Lion Share, Los Angeles – recording
- Record Plant, Los Angeles – recording
- Ocean Way, Los Angeles – recording
- Lighthouse, Los Angeles – recording
- Pedernales, Austin – recording
- The Power Station, New York – recording
- The Hit Factory, New York – recording
- Capitol Records – mastering

== Charts ==
=== Weekly charts ===
Weekly chart performance for 1100 Bel Air Place
Chart (1984–85)	Peak position
Australian Albums (Kent Music Report)	2
Austrian Albums (Ö3 Austria)	2
Canada Top Albums/CDs (RPM)	4
Danish Albums (Hitlisten)	1
French Albums Chart (SNEP)	16
Dutch Albums (Album Top 100)	3
European Albums (Music & Media)	2
German Albums (Offizielle Top 100)	7
Italian Albums (Musica e dischi)	8
Japanese Albums (Oricon)	42
New Zealand Albums (RMNZ)	1
Norwegian Albums (VG-lista)	8
Spanish Albums (AFYVE)	1
Swedish Albums (Sverigetopplistan)	9
Swiss Albums (Schweizer Hitparade)	4
UK Albums (Official Charts)	14
US Billboard 200	5

=== Year-end charts ===
1984 year-end chart performance for 1100 Bel Air Place
Chart (1984)	Position
Australian Albums (Kent Music Report)	11
Austrian Albums (Ö3 Austria)	15
Canada Top Albums/CDs (RPM)	21
Dutch Albums (Album Top 100)	57
German Albums (Offizielle Top 100)	68
Italian Albums (AFI)	24
New Zealand Albums (RMNZ)	22
Spanish Albums (AFYVE)	12
US Billboard 200	40
US Top 100 Albums (Cashbox)	18

1985 year-end chart performance for 1100 Bel Air Place
Chart (1985)	Position
Canada Top Albums/CDs (RPM)	92
French Albums Chart (SNEP)	47
New Zealand Albums (RMNZ)	43

== Certifications and sales ==
Certifications and sales for 1100 Bel Air Place
Region	Certification	Certified units/sales
Australia (ARIA)	4× Platinum	280,000^{^}
Brazil (Pro-Música Brasil)	2× Platinum	700,000
Canada (Music Canada)	5× Platinum	500,000^{^}
Denmark (IFPI Danmark)	Platinum	80,000^{^}
France (SNEP)	Gold	100,000^{*}
Italy (FIMI)	Platinum	100,000^{*}
Japan	—	28,190
Malaysia	Platinum	
Mexico (AMPROFON)	Gold	100,000^{^}
Netherlands (NVPI)	Platinum	100,000^{^}
New Zealand (RMNZ)	3× Platinum	45,000^{^}
Philippines (PARI)	Gold	
Portugal (AFP)	Gold	20,000^{^}
Singapore (RIAS)	Platinum	
Spain (Promusicae)	2× Platinum	200,000^{^}
Sweden (GLF)	Platinum	100,000^{^}
United Kingdom (BPI)	Silver	60,000^{^}
United States (RIAA)	4× Platinum	4,000,000^{^}
Summaries
Worldwide Worldwide sales up to 1986	—	9,000,000
^{*} Sales figures based on certification alone.^{^} Shipments figures based on certification alone.
