= Randy Lennox =

Canadian music and media executive

Randy Lennox OC
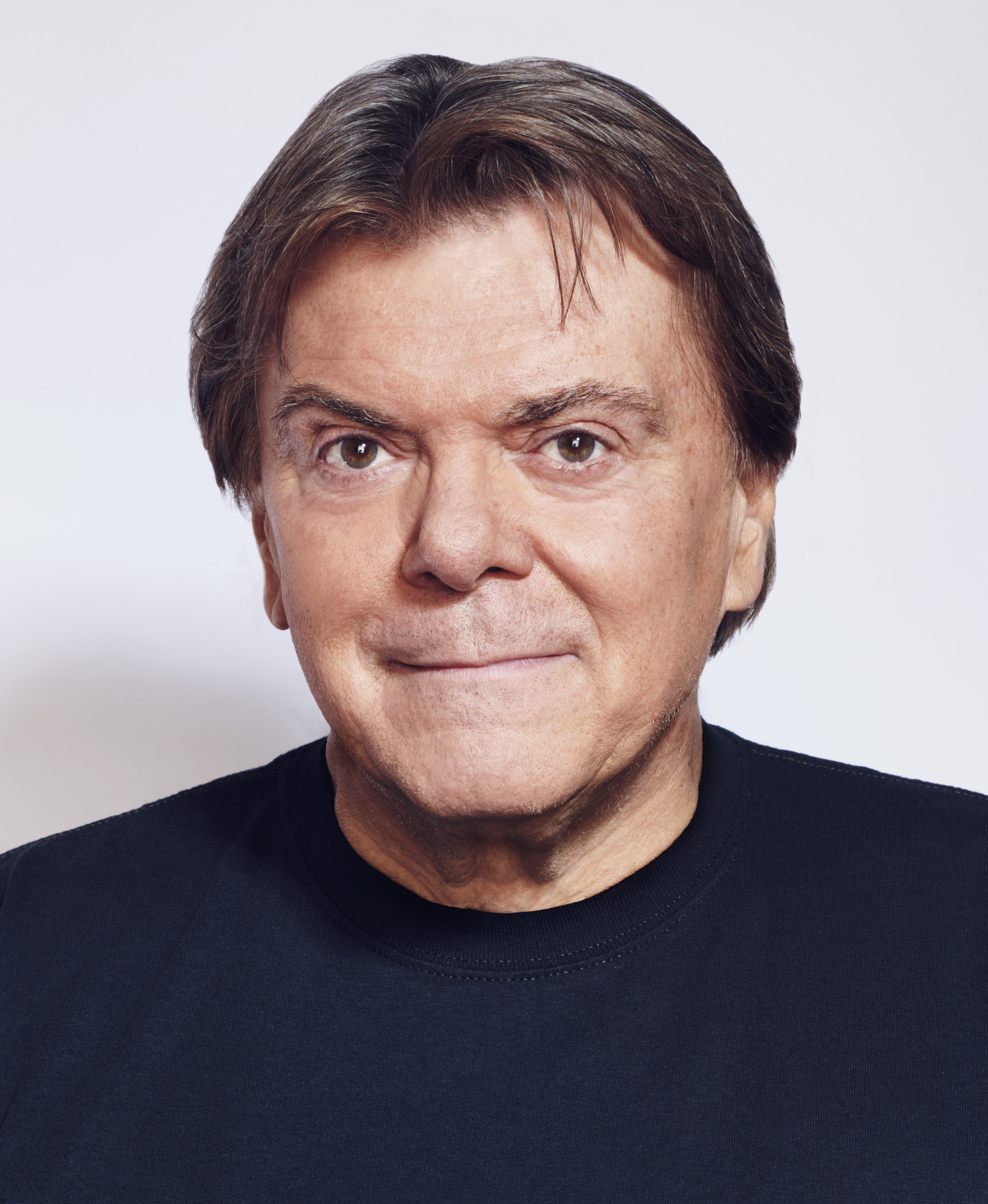
- Occupations: Music and Media Executive, Producer

Randy Lennox is a Canadian music and media executive. He is the CEO of LOFT Entertainment. He previously was president and CEO of Universal Music Canada and president of Bell Media.

While Lennox was at Universal Music Canada, the label developed Canadian artists including Drake, Justin Bieber, The Weeknd, and Shawn Mendes. At Bell Media, he led Crave's rebranding and the expansion into streaming and musical stage productions. In 2023, Lennox co-founded LOFT Entertainment to produce documentaries, films, TV shows, music and events, including the Departure Festival, formerly Canadian Music Week.

He has held leadership roles with Canada's Walk of Fame, Banff World Media Festival, and Massey and Roy Thomson Halls. Lennox has received awards and recognition, including media and music industry Executive of the Year awards, being named on most influential lists from both Toronto Life and Maclean's, induction into Canadian Music and Broadcast Industry Hall of Fame and the Walt Grealis Special Achievement Award at the 2017 Juno Awards.

In 2024, he was appointed an Officer of the Order of Canada.

== Career ==
=== Universal Music Canada ===
While at Universal, Lennox produced Oh What a Feeling: A Vital Collection of Canadian Music, the first Canadian box-set to be certified diamond and Big Shiny Tunes, the best selling album series in Canadian history. In 1998, Lennox was appointed president of Universal Music Canada following its merger with Polygram Canada. In 2001, he was also named CEO. Under his leadership, Universal Music Canada was named Music Company of the Year for 15 consecutive years by Canadian Music Week.

At Universal, Lennox signed The Weeknd and discovered Shawn Mendes. He played roles in developing Drake, Justin Bieber, The Tragically Hip, and Sam Roberts.

In 2011, Lennox organized artists including Drake, Justin Bieber, Nelly Furtado and Avril Lavigne to cover K'naan's Wavin' Flag The track, co-produced with Bob Ezrin and Gary Slaight, would go on to win the 2011 Juno Award for Single of the Year and raise over $2 million for the 2010 Haiti earthquake relief effort.

=== Bell Media ===
In 2015, Lennox joined Bell Media as President of Broadcasting. In this role he produced The Launch, an original reality music competition franchise. The new format, co-created with Scott Borchetta of Big Machine Records was picked up by Sony Pictures Television for international distribution.

He also produced Long Time Running, a documentary about The Tragically Hip which won the 2018 Excellence in Directing award from the Directors Guild of Canada. He produced Jann with Canadian singer-songwriter Jann Arden, the most watched Canadian series of 2019 and comedy of the year.

In 2017 Lennox was appointed overall president of Bell Media. In this role he signed partnerships to bring American content brands including iHeartMedia, HBO, HBO Max, BNN Bloomberg, Starz, and Vice Media to Canada to support the 2018 relaunch of the Crave streaming platform as a standalone service. Crave grew to nearly 3 million subscribers over the next two years.

Lennox also signed event partnerships between Bell Media and Just For Laughs and the Toronto International Film Festival, as well as production partnerships with Lionsgate, Pinewood Studios, Netflix, Jeffrey Katzenberg. He also partnered with Jim Steinman to launch a live stage adaptation of Meat Loaf's Bat Out of Hell which debuted in Toronto and London in 2018.

In 2019 he led Bell Media's majority acquisition and subsequent expansion of Toronto's Pinewood Studios, creating an additional 200,000-square feet worth of production space. That same year he co-produced Once Were Brothers, about Robbie Robertson, with Martin Scorsese, Ron Howard, and Brian Grazer, which won Best of the Fest, at the 2020 Palm Springs International Film Festival and was the first Canadian documentary to open TIFF. He also produced Carry It On, a documentary about Buffy Sainte Marie that won the 2023 Emmy for International Arts.

In 2020, in response to the COVID-19 pandemic, Lennox produced the largest non-sports broadcasting event in Canadian history, Stronger Together, Tous Ensemble, a 90-minute event which saw 100 Canadian broadcast partners work together to raise more than $8 million for Food Banks Canada at the onset of the COVID-19 pandemic.

=== LOFT Entertainment ===
In 2023, Lennox co-founded LOFT Entertainment Inc. a music management and television content company.

In 2024, in partnership with Denver-based sports entertainment venue developer Oak View Group, Lennox acquired Canadian Music Week in order to "expand programming, enhance venues and offer unique engagement opportunities for artists and fans."

== Awards & recognition ==
In 2002, Lennox was named one of the top 50 Most Influential Canadians by Maclean's Magazine. In 2010, Lennox was inducted into the Canadian Music and Broadcast Industry Hall of Fame as part of Canadian Music Week. In 2014, Lennox was named Label Executive of the Year at the Worldwide Radio Summit. In 2015, 2018 and 2019 he was named on Toronto Life's 50 Most Influential list.

In 2017, in recognition of his contribution to the growth and development of the Canadian music industry, Lennox received the Walt Grealis Special Achievement Award at the 2017 Juno Awards where he was praised by U2's Bono and Gene Simmons of Kiss. The same year he was also named Media Executive of the Year by Playback Magazine.

In 2024, he was appointed an Officer of the Order of Canada, the first major-label executive to receive the honour.
