= Missing You (Diana Ross song) =

1984 single by Diana Ross

Single by Diana Ross

from the album Swept Away
- B-side: "We Are the Children of the World"
- Released: November 13, 1984 (US)
- Recorded: 1984
- Length: 4:16
- Label: RCA
- Songwriter: Lionel Richie
- Producers: Lionel Richie; James Anthony Carmichael

Diana Ross singles chronology
"Touch by Touch" (1984)	"Missing You" (1984)	"Eaten Alive" (1985)

Audio
- "Missing You" on YouTube

"Missing You" is a song performed by American singer Diana Ross, recorded for her 1984 album Swept Away. The song was written, composed, and produced by Lionel Richie as a tribute to Marvin Gaye, who was murdered by his father earlier that year. The memorial song was released as the album's fourth single on November 13, 1984, by RCA. Richie also provided background vocals on the song.

== Content and reception ==
The song was built during conversations about Gaye shared by Ross and Richie, who came up with a song shortly thereafter. Released in late 1984, the song became Ross' last top 40 hit on the U.S. pop singles chart, hitting the top ten in the spring of 1985. In Billboard Hot 100 singles sales, it was particularly strong, hitting #5. It was her last song to reach number one on the R&B singles chart, and was so popular and enduring that it ranked as the 3rd biggest hit of 1985 on that chart, fueling her nomination as Female R&B Vocalist of the Year at the American Music Awards (alongside Whitney Houston and Aretha Franklin).

The video for the song was the first to be played on VH1, following a clip of "The Star-Spangled Banner" as performed by Marvin Gaye.

== Chart history ==
=== Weekly charts ===
Chart (1984–1985)	Peak position
Australia (Kent Music Report)	95
Canada Singles (RPM)	29
Canada Adult Contemporary (RPM)	1
UK Singles (Official Charts)	76
US Billboard Hot 100	10
US Adult Contemporary (Billboard)	4
US Hot Black Singles (Billboard)	1
US Cash Box Top 100	13

=== Year-end charts ===
Chart (1985)	Position
US Billboard Hot 100	49
US Adult Contemporary (Billboard)	11
US Hot Black Singles (Billboard)	3
