= It's Your Move (disambiguation) =

It's Your Move is an American sitcom starring Jason Bateman.

It's Your Move may also refer to:

- It's Your Move (game show), a Canadian game show
- "It's Your Move", a song by Mina from her album Italiana Vol. 2
- It's Your Move (song), a song by Doug Parkinson, covered by America and Diana Ross
- It's Your Move a 1945 short film starring Edgar Kennedy
- It's Your Move (1968 film), a film starring Edward G. Robinson
- It's Your Move (1982 film), a film by Eric Sykes
- It's Your Move, a series of books on chess by Chris Ward
- It's Your Move (album), a 2004 album by Freddie Jackson
