= Pieces of Ice =

Single by Diana Ross

from the album Ross
- B-side: "Still in Love"
- Released: June 17, 1983
- Genre: Rock; post-disco; R&B; new wave; dance-pop
- Length: 4:58 (album version); 3:57 (7" version); 7:19 (12" version)
- Label: RCA
- Songwriter(s): Marc Jordan; John Capek
- Producer(s): Gary Katz

Diana Ross singles chronology
"So Close" (1983)	"Pieces of Ice" (1983)	"Up Front" (1983)

Music video
- "Pieces of Ice" on YouTube

"Pieces of Ice" is a song written by Marc Jordan and John Capek and recorded by American singer Diana Ross. It was produced by Gary Katz, and was released on June 17, 1983 as the first single from the singer's self-titled album, Ross (1983). It was the only simultaneous top forty single the singer scored on this album, which was one of her rare misses on RCA Records in the early 1980s. In the US, the song reached #31 on the Billboard Hot 100 chart and #15 on the soul singles chart. In Europe, "Pieces of Ice" peaked at #46 in the UK, and it charted best in Norway, where it reached #8. The song was released in three different version lengths: a 7-inch version at 3:57, an album version at 4:58, and the 12-inch version at 7:19. The US-released 12-inch single also includes an instrumental version as its B-side.

== Music video ==
The accompanying music video for "Pieces of Ice" was the first to feature Bob Giraldi as director; he would direct several Ross videos during this period, and features Ross in a slithery red bodysuit. It was also the first video that showcased choreography.

== Personnel ==
- Diana Ross − lead vocals
- Gary Katz − producer
- Joe Walsh − guitar
- Larry Carlton − guitar
- Jeff Porcaro − drums
- Greg Phillinganes − keyboards, keyboard bass
- Jim Horn − saxophone, flute

== Charts ==
Chart (1983)	Peak position
Australia (Kent Music Report)	73
Finland (Suomen virallinen lista)	12
Netherlands (Dutch Top 40)	12
Norway (VG-lista)	8
Sweden (Sverigetopplistan)	14
UK Singles (OCC)	46
US Billboard Hot 100	31
US Hot R&B/Hip-Hop Songs (Billboard)	15
US Dance Club Songs (Billboard)	17
US Cash Box Top 100	30
West Germany (Offizielle Top 75)	39

== Influence ==
The song heavily influenced the theme and title of American children’s author Timothy Bellavia‘s Young Adult graphic novel. Bellavia's book with the same title was nominated for Outstanding LGTBQ Memoir at the Lambda Literary Foundation Award in 2009.
