= Timothy D. Bellavia =

American writer

Timothy Bellavia
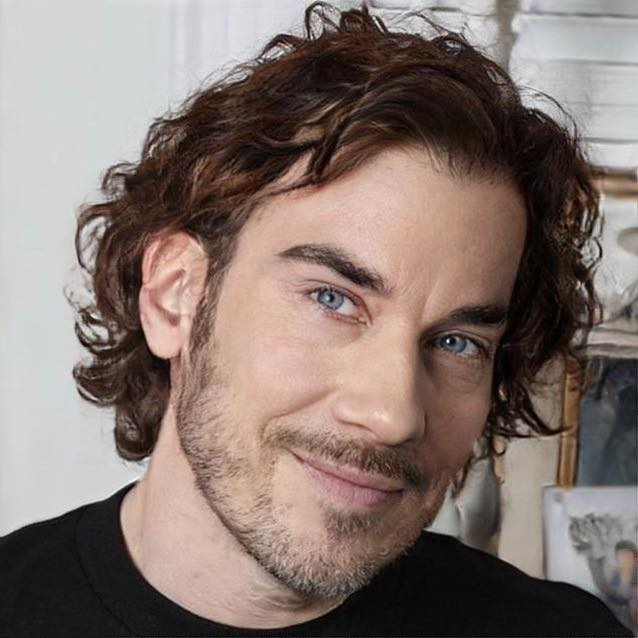
- Timothy photographed by Lola Flash in December 2019
- Born: May 1, 1971 (age 55); Buffalo, New York, U.S.
- Education: Roberts Wesleyan University; Pratt Institute (MFA); Fashion Institute of Technology
- Occupations: Author, illustrator, educator, producer, dancer, fabric artist, doll-maker
- Website: www.weareallthesameinside.org

Timothy Bellavia (born 1971) is an American children's author, fabric artist and educator. Bellavia is best known for his education research through his We Are All the Same Inside ® children's book series and accompanying Sage doll.

== Career ==
Once an aspiring fashion designer, Timothy Bellavia turned his attention to arts education / pedagogy through dolls and has collaborated with several non-profit organisations including Sesame Workshop, Mattie J.T. Stepanek Foundation, and the Herbie Hancock Institute of Jazz. He was a recipient of Education Update’s Outstanding Educator of the Year Award, won several arts and digital education awards and served as an integral part of the five-year research project to highlight the importance of integrating STEAM (Science, Technology, Engineering, Arts and Mathematics) topics into elementary school's curriculum.

The five-year research project, entitled Young Academic Music (YAM) was funded through an Education Innovation Research (EIR) grant from the Office of Elementary and Secondary Education (OESE).

Timothy is an Associate Professor of Alternative Programs and University Partnerships within the Graduate School of Education at Touro University in New York City .

== Awards and nominations ==
Year	Nominee / work	Award	Result
1997	Skowhegan School of Painting and Sculpture Artist Residency	Fellowship Grant Award	Won
2001	We Are All the Same Inside	Christopher Award	Nominated
2003	Young Adult Institute	YAI Educator of the Year Award	Won
2009	Pieces of Ice	Lambda Literary Foundation Award	Nominated
2016	Outstanding Educator of the Year	Education Update Award	Won
2017	38th Annual Flushing Town Hall / Smithsonian Affiliate Gala	Honouree: Abundant Heart Award	Won
2021	New York Foundation for the Arts	City Artist Corps Grant Award	Won
2021	Non-Broadcast Short Form Web Video for "Treble Leads the Class"	Viddy Award	Won
2021	Creative Art Direction for "Treble Leads the Class"	MarCOM Gold Award	Won
2022	Outstanding Digital Animation Creation (Platinum) for "Treble Leads the Class"	Ava Digital Award	Won
2022	Video Creativity / Outstanding Animation for "Treble Goes A'Go-Go"	Hermes Creative Award	Won
2022	Motion Graphics / Design for "Treble Catches the Rhythm Train"	Telly Award	Won
2022	Non-Broadcast: 2-D Animation for "Treble Catches the Rhythm Train"	Telly Award	Won
2022	Outstanding Education Website	dotCOMM Award	Won
2022	Outstanding Writing for Animation Short for "Treble Catches the Rhythm Train"	Emmy Award	Nominated
2022	Outstanding Animation Education Short for "Treble Catches the Rhythm Train"	Emmy Award	Nominated
2022	Arts Educators' Learning Lab: Celebrating the Creation of Culturally Responsive Practices in Education Spaces	New York City Arts in Education Roundtable Grant	Won
2022	Outstanding Education Animation for "Treble Catches the Rhythm Train"	MarCOM Platinum Award	Won
2022	Creative Art Direction for "Treble Goes A'Go-Go"	MarCOM Gold Award	Won
2023	Outstanding Digital Animation Creation (Platinum) for "Treble Goes A'Go Go"	Ava Digital Award	Won
2023	Outstanding Motion Graphics (Platinum) for "Treble Catches the Rhythm Train"	Ava Digital Award	Won
2023	Non-Broadcast: Not-for-Profit [Animation] for "Treble Goes A'Go-Go"	Telly Award	Won
2023	Finalist: Male Entrepreneurial Leader of the Year [Education Champion Award]	ACEEU Triple E: People's Choice Award	Won
2026	Outstanding Director (Male) for "The Grass is Stone"	Independent Shorts Awards	Won
2026	Outstanding LGTBQ+ Short for "The Grass is Stone"	Independent Shorts Awards	Won
2026	Outstanding Mirco Short for "The Grass is Stone"	Cal Art Film Festival	Won
2026	Outstanding Original Song for "The Grass is Stone"	IndieX Film Fest	Won
2026	Outstanding Director (Male) for "The Grass is Stone"	IndieX Film Fest	Nominated
2026	Outstanding LGTBQ+ Short for "The Grass is Stone"	IndieX Film Fest	Nominated
2026	Outstanding Animation Short for "The Grass is Stone"	IndieX Film Fest	Nominated
2027	Outstanding Animation Short for "The Grass is Stone"	New York Indie Shorts Awards	Won

== Selected Bibliography ==
=== Children's Picture Books ===
- We Are All the Same Inside (2000)
- Come and Abide (2002)
- Theo and the Sisters of Sage! (2003)
- Sage Goes to Kindergarten (2006)
- Paper, Scissors & Magic - Seven Ways to Get Kids to Love Books (2007)
- The Inside Story – Commemorating the 10th Anniversary of Sage and acclaimed doll-making workshop (2009)
- La historia por dentro (2011)
- Vu de l'interier (2011)
- We Are All the Same Inside Curriculum – Activities, Stories, Doll Patterns and More! (2018)
- Tales at Luv Micheal: The Big Idea (2020)
- Treble Leads the Class - with Susan Courey (2021)
- Treble Catches the Rhythm Train - with Susan Courey (2021)
- Treble Goes 'A Go-Go - with Susan Courey (2022)
- The Sage Doll Through the Years - An Illustrated History, Paper Dolls and More! (2023)

=== Young Adult ===
- Pieces of Ice - with Kristin Walsh (2009)
- W.T.* is a Sage Doll?! (2025)
- Diana Ross #Star80+ A Celebration of 80 Gowns, Dolls & Years! (2025)

== Personal life ==
Bellavia was born May 1, 1971, in Buffalo, New York, and grew up in Waterport, New York. He is the third of four siblings, including singer-songwriter Rand Bellavia of Ookla the Mok (band) and Staff Sargent David Bellavia the recipient Congressional Medal of Honour.

He graduated from Roberts Wesleyan University in Rochester, New York, and earned an MFA from Pratt Institute in Brooklyn, New York. He then moved to Manhattan working as a teaching artist, model, and as a backup dancer for Cyndi Lauper, before landing a job as a curator at the Lower East Side Tenement Museum in New York City.

Bellavia was awarded a scholarship fellowship grant to attend Skowhegan School of Painting and Sculpture in 1997, completed Fashion Institute of Technology's Creative Enterprise Ownership Program in 2000 and is the author of several children's picture books, including Treble Leads the Class, Paper Scissors and Magic: 7 Ways to Get your Kids to LOVE Books and the award- winning We Are All the Same Inside.

== T.I.M.M.-E. Company ==
The T.I.M.M_E. Company, INC. was founded in 2000 and is a multimedia studio crafting innovation media, fine art and intergenerational arts education programs. The T.I.M.M.-E. Company is the publisher of We Are All the Same Inside and has developed curriculum with dolls featured in Bellavia's children's picture books. In 2003, Bellavia presented his curriculum at the United Nations on the International day of Tolerance in co-operation with the Anti-Defamation League and the We Are Family Foundation. The theme of his address was Educating Our Children For A Safer World. His presentation to the United Nations council was also later broadcast by Court TV and TruTV.

The T.I.M.M.-E. Company has conducted workshops in conjunction with the New York City Department of Education celebrate our common humanity to New York City's school children while integrating the arts into the literacy curriculum. Continuing a partnership that began in 2004 with Sesame Reads Annual Literacy Day, the T.I.M.M.-E. Company participated in celebrating the 105th anniversary of CLC (The Children's Learning Center) on September 21, 2007, in Stamford, Connecticut. The highlight of the event was an appearance by Rosita, Abby Cadabby and some Honkers. Other Sesame Workshop speakers included the award-winning animator Jim Jinkins, creator of Global Thingy and Pinky Dinky Doo.

== We Are All the Same Inside ==
We Are All the Same Inside is a 2000 children's picture book by Timothy Bellavia, which earned a Christopher Award nomination for Best Children's Picture Book. 2010 marked the tenth anniversary publication of We Are All the Same Inside ® and the Sage doll-making workshop. A special 10th anniversary version of the book was released in 2010. The reissued picture book featured paper doll patterns, teacher curriculum, a 10-year chronology, and rare photographs. To commemorate the anniversary, singer, songwriter and former Motown Records producer Sherlie Matthews co-wrote and co-produced a special children's multi-track compact disc. The Brooklyn Historical Society hosted a We Are All the Same Inside Sage doll-making workshop on October 24, 2010.

== Sage Doll ==
A patented doll invented by Timothy Bellavia in 1998 consisting of interchangeable fitted coverings onto which alternative characters have been sewn, painted, silk-screened or otherwise attached. The Sage doll has illustrated internal organs and lacks any of the identifiable external characteristics such as a human would have, including skin, hair or clothing. Alternative coverings, which may be added to the doll, portray different characters with characteristics of sex, race, religion, nationality and personality. The Sage doll is intended for use as an educational tool to demonstrate the interrelationship between the inner anatomy of a human (heart, lungs, internal features) and the outer anatomy (skin, hair and facial features). The Sage doll demonstrates to both children and adults that while outer appearance may vary greatly, the dolls and by analogy, human beings, are substantially the same inside.

== Young Academic Music Research Group ==
Young Academic Music and Computational Thinking (YAM) was a five-year research project funded through an Education Innovation Research (EIR) grant from the United States Office of Elementary and Secondary Education (OESE). The project highlights the importance of integrating STEAM (Science, Technology, Engineering, Arts and Mathematics) topics into elementary school's curriculum. The curriculum, notably features a series of children's picture books and animated videos: "Treble Leads the Class" (2021), "Treble Catches the Rhythm Train" (2021) and "Treble Goes A 'Go-Go" (2022) all written, conceived and produced by P.I. (Principal Investigator) Susan Courey with Touro University Associate Professor Timothy Bellavia in partnership with the Herbie Hancock Institute of Jazz. Herbie Hancock, himself narrates the three whimsical stories of music notes, which come alive to attend school together. The award-winning education series was created by the collaborative efforts of Mika Shino (producer), T.I.M.M.-E. Company (design concepts), Atomic Kid Studios (animators), CJ Emmons the principal singer of ABC's Dancing with the Stars (voice overs), and Nick Vayenas (music).

== Diana Ross #Star80+ A Celebration of 80 Gowns, Dolls & Years ==
A digital storytelling celebration honoring the iconic singer Diana Ross on the eve of her 80th birthday - #Star80+ A Celebration of 80 Gowns, Dolls, and Years was conceived, produced and directed by Timothy Bellavia. The YouTube web series was a multi-platform event featuring interviews, fan tributes, and fashion-focused content including the 80 plus We Are All the Same Inside ® Sage dolls created by Bellavia himself of Ms Ross' iconic gowns.

Interviewed by Los Angeles based talk show host Davi Davenport on her regional TV program Davi Davenport LIVE! , #Star80+ aimed to spotlight Ross' enduring influence on popular culture. The project gained significant traction through social media, where fans and celebrities alike shared their admiration for the legendary Motown recording artist and actress.

Notable participants in the #Star80+ web series included Gossip Columnist Michael Musto, Television Producer Patrick L. Riley, Grammy-winning song-writer Frannie Golde and Writer, Producer and Motown Historian Andrew Skurow.

== Discography ==
- We Are All the Same Inside ® 10th Anniversary - with Sherlie Matthews (2010)
- The Grass is Stone Original Motion Picture Soundtrack - with Dan Giangiobbe (2026)

== Filmography ==
Year	Title	Distributor
2003	We Are Family: Educating Our Children for a Safer World	Court TV / We Are Family Foundation
2010	The Inside Story – Commemorating the 10th Anniversary of Sage and acclaimed doll-making workshop	Amazon
2016	Beyond Skin Deep	Touro University
2019	Courage, Humour and a Life Changing Decision	Weill Cornell
2021	Treble Leads the Class	Herbie Hancock Institute of Jazz / United States Department of Education
2021	Treble Catches the Rhythm Train	Herbie Hancock Institute of Jazz / United States Department of Education
2022	Treble Goes 'A Go Go - Dedicated to Mary Wilson of The Supremes	Herbie Hancock Institute of Jazz / United States Department of Education
2024	Reading Revolution	Book Vending Group
2025	Diana Ross #Star80+ A Celebration of 80 Gowns, Dolls & Years!	YouTube Web Series
2026	The Grass is Stone - An Animated Short on Love	New York Indie Shorts Awards Short Film Showcase
