= Duff Roman =

Canadian radio personality and executive

David Mostoway CM (born 1938 in Swift Current, Saskatchewan), known on-air as Duff Roman, is a Canadian radio personality and executive who was named by the Canadian Academy of Recording Arts and Sciences as the winner of the Walt Grealis Special Achievement Award at the Juno Awards of 2019 for his contributions to the Canadian music industry.

== Radio career ==
He worked as an on-air personality for a variety of radio stations in Western Canada before moving to Toronto, Ontario, where he became most famously associated with CHUM-FM. He was promoted to program director of the station in 1974, and to operations manager of the station in 1984. As operations manager, he oversaw the station's transition to an adult contemporary program format which made it the most listened-to station in the Toronto radio market. In the 1990s he became vice-president of industry affairs for CHUM Limited.

During the 1990s, he served as chairman of the Canadian Association of Broadcasters, and oversaw Digital Radio Research, a joint consortium of the CAB and the Canadian Broadcasting Corporation to review and develop policy around the emergence and development of digital radio in Canada.

== Music industry ==
He was the head of Roman Records, an independent record label most noted for releasing early singles by The Hawks, The Paupers and David Clayton-Thomas. He was also a producer of recordings for the label, credited as David Mostoway.

One of the bands that he managed were The Paupers.

== Awards ==
In addition to the Walt Grealis Award, Roman was inducted into the Canadian Association of Broadcasters Hall of Fame in 2001, and the Canadian Music Industry Hall of Fame in 2006.
