= Walt Grealis Special Achievement Award =

Canadian music award

The Walt Grealis Special Achievement Award is awarded by the Canadian Academy of Recording Arts and Sciences to "individuals who have contributed to the growth and development of the Canadian music industry." It is given annually every Juno Awards ceremony and named after one of the founders of the awards.

== Recipients ==
- 1984 - J. Lyman Potts
- 1985 - A. Hugh Joseph
- 1986 - Jack Richardson
- 1987 - Bruce Allen
- 1989 - Sam Sniderman
- 1990 - Raffi
- 1991 - Mel Shaw
- 1992 - William Harold Moon
- 1993 - Brian Robertson
- 1994 - John Mills
- 1995 - Louis Applebaum
- 1996 - Ronnie Hawkins
- 1997 - Dan Gibson
- 1998 - Sam Feldman
- 1999 - Allan Waters
- 2000 - Emile Berliner
- 2001 - Daniel Caudeiron
- 2002 - Michael Cohl
- 2003 - Terry McBride
- 2004 - Walt Grealis
- 2005 - Allan Slaight
- 2006 - Bernie Finkelstein
- 2007 - Donald K. Tarlton
- 2008 - Moses Znaimer
- 2009 - Fred Sherratt
- 2010 - Ross Reynolds
- 2011 - Deane Cameron
- 2012 - Gary Slaight
- 2013 - Larry LeBlanc
- 2014 - Frank Davies
- 2015 - Ray Danniels
- 2016 - Rosalie Trombley
- 2017 - Randy Lennox
- 2018 - Denise Donlon
- 2019 - Duff Roman
- 2021 - Pegi Cecconi
- 2022 - Denise Jones
- 2023 - Ron Sakamoto
- 2024 - Chip Sutherland
- 2025 - Riley O’Connor
- 2026 - Sandy Pandya (ArtHaus), Vinny Cinquemani (Paquin Entertainment), Alexander Mair (Attic Records)

== See also ==
- Music of Canada
