= To All the Girls I've Loved Before =

Song by Hal David and Albert Hammond

Single by Julio Iglesias and Willie Nelson

from the album 1100 Bel Air Place
- B-side: "I Don't Want to Wake You"
- Released: February 1984
- Recorded: 1983
- Genre: Country
- Length: 3:30
- Label: Columbia
- Songwriters: Albert Hammond and Hal David
- Producer: Richard Perry

Julio Iglesias singles chronology
| "The Air That I Breathe" (1983) | "To All the Girls I've Loved Before" (1984) | "Coração apaixonado" (1985) |

Willie Nelson singles chronology
| "Without a Song" (1983) | "To All the Girls I've Loved Before" (1984) | "City of New Orleans" (1984) |

"To All the Girls I've Loved Before" is a song written by Hal David (words) and Albert Hammond (music). It was originally recorded by Hammond in 1975 on his album 99 Miles From L.A., but is more famous for a 1984 recording by Julio Iglesias and Willie Nelson, which appeared on Iglesias's album 1100 Bel Air Place. A breakthrough for Iglesias in the English language market, though he had enjoyed a 1981 UK number one with a largely Spanish-language version of "Begin the Beguine", the song peaked at No. 5 on the Billboard Hot 100 and No. 1 on the Canadian RPM Top Singles chart. "To All the Girls I've Loved Before" went to number one on the country chart, and was one of two entries on the country chart for Julio Iglesias and Willie Nelson as a duo (the second was "Spanish Eyes", which peaked at No. 8 in late 1988).

== Background ==
David and Hammond created the song in 1975 and registered it with the US Copyright Office on April 28 of that year. Following Bobby Vinton's recording released on October 9, 1980, the song was registered as published in the US.

== Commercial performance ==
The song was Iglesias' biggest hit in the United States and Canada, and Nelson's biggest European hit. The record also appeared on the Australian, New Zealand and South African charts. The song has become Iglesias's signature English-language tune, prominently performed at his concerts since the single's release. Thanks to this song, 1100 Bel Air Place became Iglesias' worldwide best-selling album. In 1984, Nelson and Iglesias were also named "duo of the year" by the Country Music Association, and "To All the Girls I've Loved Before" was named single of the year by the Academy of Country Music.

== Charts ==
=== Weekly Charts ===
| Chart (1984) | Peak position |
|---|---|
| Australian Kent Music Report | 4 |
| Austrian Top 40 | 4 |
| Belgian VRT Top 30 | 1 |
| Canadian RPM Adult Contemporary Tracks | 1 |
| Canadian RPM Country Tracks | 1 |
| Canadian RPM Top Singles | 1 |
| Dutch Top 40 | 3 |
| Euro Hit 40 | 12 |
| French Singles Chart | 41 |
| German Media Control Charts | 24 |
| Irish Singles Chart | 16 |
| Italian Singles Chart | 32 |
| Radio Luxembourg Singles | 15 |
| New Zealand Singles Chart | 2 |
| South African Singles Chart | 2 |
| Spanish Singles Chart | 2 |
| Swiss Music Charts | 23 |
| UK Singles Chart | 17 |
| U.S. Billboard Hot 100 | 5 |
| U.S. Billboard Hot Adult Contemporary Tracks | 3 |
| U.S. Billboard Hot Country Singles | 1 |
| U.S. Cashbox Top 100 | 3 |
| Zimbabwe Singles Chart | 7 |

=== Year-end charts ===
| Chart (1984) | Position |
|---|---|
| Australia (Kent Music Report) | 29 |
| Austrian Top 40 | 8 |
| Belgian VRT Top 30 | 10 |
| Canadian RPM Top Singles | 12 |
| Dutch Top 40 | 30 |
| New Zealand Top 40 | 24 |
| South African Singles Chart | 8 |
| Spanish Singles Chart | 19 |
| US Billboard Hot 100 | 50 |
| U.S. Billboard Hot Adult Contemporary Singles | 27 |
| US Hot Country Songs (Billboard) | 1 |
| U.S. Cashbox Top 100 | 33 |

== Certifications ==
Certifications for "To All the Girls I've Loved Before"
| Region | Certification | Certified units/sales |
|---|---|---|
| Canada (Music Canada) | Platinum | 100,000^{^} |
| United States (RIAA) | Platinum | 1,000,000^{^} |
^{^} Shipments figures based on certification alone.
