= Red Leaf Records =

- Founded: 1965
- Founder: Duff Roman; Danny Mostoway; Art Snider; David Pears; Stan Klees
- Status: Inactive since 1969
- Genre: Various
- Country of origin: Canada
- Location: Toronto, Ontario

Red Leaf Records was a Canadian independent record label founded in 1965 by record producers Duff Roman, Danny Mostoway, Art Snider, David Pears, and Stan Klees. Created as a cooperative venture, the company aimed to increase the promotion and distribution of Canadian recordings under a unified national brand.

== History ==
was founded in January 1965 by independent Canadian record producers Duff Roman and Danny Mostoway (Roman Records), Art Snider and David Pears (Chateau, Canatal, ACT), and Stan Klees (Tamarac, Bigland),. Believing that radio stations, record dealers and consumers had become confused by the profusion of small labels whose releases were few and far between and scantily promoted and advertised, Red Leaf's founders retired their own labels to join forces in a national super-independent Each unit operated independently of each other, but capitalized on the identity of a larger, cohesive organization. The next year (1966) the label won the Juno Gold Leaf award for "Canadian Content Company".

Beginning in early 1965, Red Leaf released records by a wide array of artists, including rock and pop acts like The Paupers David Clayton Thomas and Bobby Vann from Toronto, The Characters from Ottawa, and The British Modbeats from St. Catharines. Other releases featured soul singers Shirley Matthews and Jay Jackson, girl groups like The Allan Sisters and The Charmaines, the country duo The Rainvilles, novelty records by The Teenyboppers and radio jock Dave Mickey, and even a Christmas 45. The label released two LPs and about three dozen singles before dissolving in the late 1960s.

== Discography ==
=== Albums ===
NUMBER	ARTIST	TITLE
RED 1001	Little Caesar & The Consuls	Little Caesar & The Consuls
RED 1002	The British Modbeats	Mod Is...

=== Singles ===
NUMBER	ARTIST	A SIDE	B SIDE
DG-65001	David Clayton Thomas	"Walk That Walk"	"Hey Hey Hey"
DG-65002	The Paupers	"Never Send You Flowers"	"Sooner Than Soon"
DG-65003	The Paupers	"If I Told My Baby"	"Like You Like Me"
DG-65004	Bobby Vann	"Somebody New"	"My Carolyn"
TTM 610	The Butterfingers	"Baby Ruth"	"Too Early in the Morn"
TTM 611	Shirley Matthews	"Stop The Clock"	"If I Had To Do It All Again"
TTM 612	Little Casear & The Consuls	"(My Girl) Sloopy"	"Poison Ivy"
TTM 613	Little Casear & The Consuls	"You Really Got A Hold On Me"	"It's So Easy"
TTM 614	Jay Jackson	"Darlin' Don't You Go"	"Anytime"
TTM 615	Greg Hamon	"Keep on Telling Me"	"Shendah"
TTM 616	Little Caesar & The Consuls	"You Talk Too Much"	"Hey Girl!"
TTM 617	Jimmy Dybold	"A Bit of Love"	"Breaking My Little Heart Girl"
TTM 618	Little Caesar & The Consuls	"A Thousand Miles Away"	"Just Like Romeo and Juliet"
TTM 619	Jack Hardin & The Silhouettes	"I'm Not Running After You (Anymore)"	"I Will Never Turn My Back On You"
TTM 620	The British Modbeats	"Whatcha Gonna Do About It"	"The Price of Love"
TTM 621	Jimmy Dybold	"Do You Remember?"	"Only For A While"
TTM 622	The Teenyboppers	"Dear Mr. D.J."	"Dear Mr. D.J."
TTM 623	Greg Hamon	"Here, There and Everywhere"	"Yorkville Blues"
TTM 624	The Characters	"Tell Me"	"There's Always Time For Love"
TTM 625	The British Modbeats	"Love's Just A Broken Heart"	"You're My World"
TTM 626	The Scoundrelz	"Heartbreak Hotel"	"Poor John"
TTM 627	Linda Layne	"Hang On To Me Now Baby"	"I Would Bring Sunshine"
TTM 628	COC North Pole	"Jingle Bells"	"Silent Night"
TTM 629	?	?	?
TTM 630	Mel West & The Meteors	"Marilyn"	"The Seventh Saint"
TTM 631	The Characters	"Daddy Rollin' Stone"	"I'm Gonna Win You Back"
TTM 632	The British Modbeats	"Somebody Help Me"	"Ain't Nobody Home But Me"
TTM 633	The Magic Cycle	"Let's Run Away"	"Halfway to Heaven"
TTM 634	The Rainvilles	"I Got What I Wanted"	"It's All Your Fault"
TTM 635	Nobody	"Follow Me"	"To A Lovely Lady"
TTM 636	The British Modbeats	"Try To Understand"	"Sorrow"
TTM 637	The Magic Cycle	"Give Me The Right"	"It Was You"
