= Sam Feldman (music executive) =

Canadian music executive

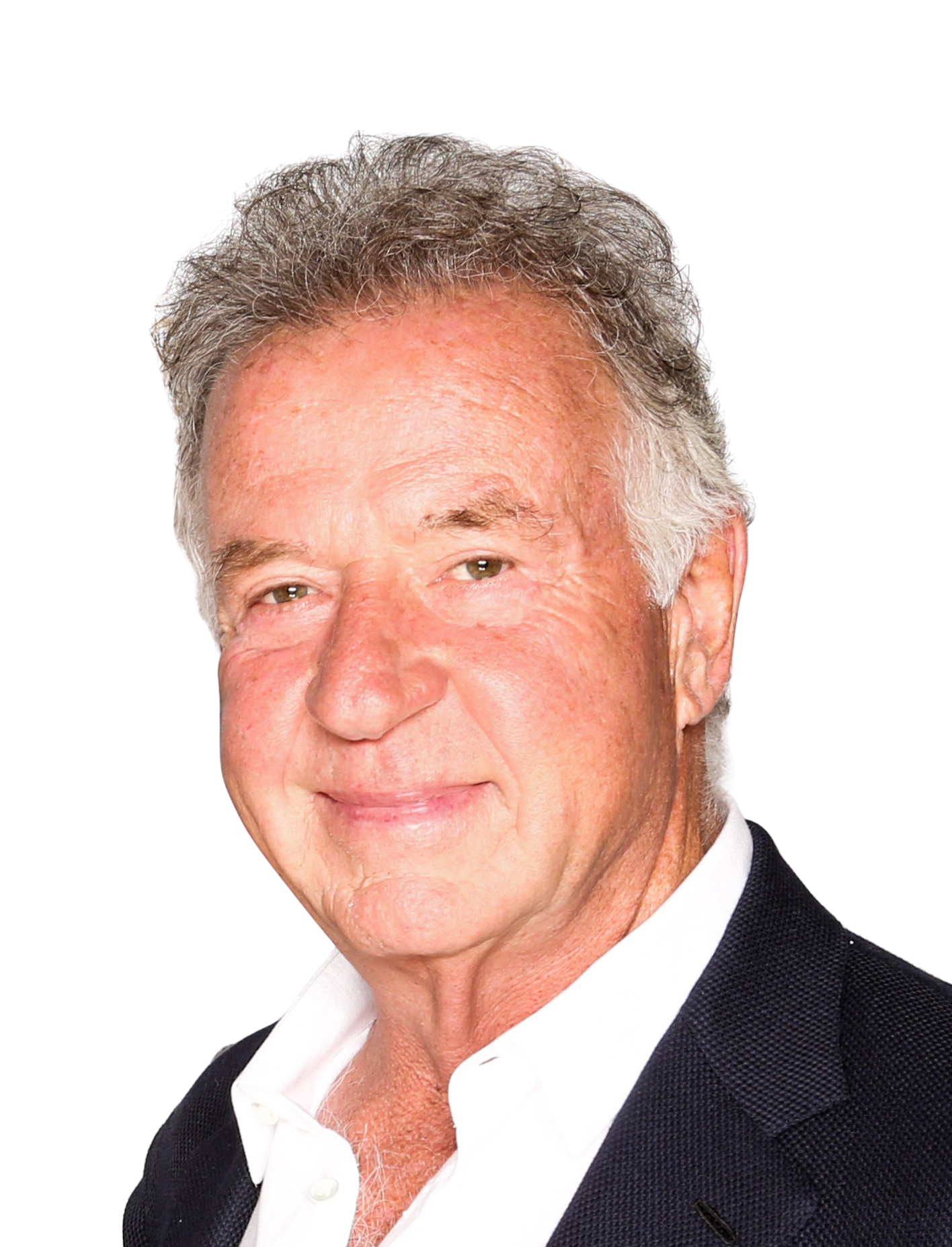
- Born: Samuel Leon Feldman; 1949 (age 76–77); Shanghai, China
- Occupation: Music executive
- Website: mfmgt.com

Samuel Leon Feldman OBC (born 1949) is a Canadian music executive. He is the co-founder of A&F Music Ltd. and S.L. Feldman and Associates. Feldman has represented artists including James Taylor, Joni Mitchell, Norah Jones, Sarah McLachlan, Leonard Cohen, Diana Krall, and Elvis Costello. Based in Vancouver, Feldman’s business activities include Macklam Feldman Management, Big Pictures Entertainment, and Music Supervision Services. In addition to his admission into the Order of British Columbia, Feldman is an inductee of the BC Entertainment Hall of Fame.

== Early life ==
Samuel Leon Feldman was born in 1949 in Shanghai to parents of Russian Jewish descent. The Feldman family immigrated to Vancouver, British Columbia in the year 1951, during Sam's early childhood. Feldman attended Lord Byng Secondary School. He then worked summer jobs, including in the pulp and paper industry in Prince Rupert and traveled to Europe. In 1970, he worked as a doorman at the Daisy nightclub in the Vancouver neighbourhood of Kitsilano. in order to repay $300 that he had borrowed from a friend for the trip. He began booking local artists while promoting small music events in the Vancouver area. In the process he met Bruce Allen, a more senior music business entrepreneur, who was booking bands in many of the local nightclubs, including the Daisy.

== Career ==
In 1972, Feldman joined Allen’s company, Bruce Allen Talent Promotions Limited. Soon after, Feldman and Allen entered a 50/50 partnership to form A&F Music Ltd. The business catered to musicians on the Canadian West Coast and found early success in managing bands such as Bachman-Turner Overdrive, Trooper, Prism, and Doug and the Slugs. While Allen was busy managing Bachman-Turner Overdrive, Feldman focused on building the booking business and administration of A&F Music Ltd.

In 1979, Feldman rebranded the agency division of A&F Music Ltd as S.L. Feldman and Associates and moved the agency division into separate offices. He and Allen continued to be equal partners in their parent company, A&F Music Ltd. Feldman maintained other business interests in the entertainment industry, including a number of nightclubs in the greater Vancouver area. By 1982, S.L Feldman & Associates controlled 90% of the booking agency business in Greater Vancouver.

In 1990, Feldman partnered with Larry Goldhar, owner of the theatrical agency The Characters Talent Agency Ltd in Toronto, to launch the west-coast division of Characters, which, combined with S.L. Feldman & Associates, created Canada’s first full-service talent agency. Together, Feldman and Goldhar acquired Vancouver-based company the Morton Talent Agency and took over 800 clients. Feldman and Goldhar restructured the company and downsized the client list, which led to a 40% increase in sales. S.L Feldman & Associates moved into a new building at the entrance to Granville Island. The company included a management division, partnerships with recording and publishing companies, a T-shirt distribution company, a consulting arm, and a theatrical talent agency. Feldman continued growing into entertainment industry-related businesses, expanding into film & television production and music supervision, licensing music for movies and television. Such film & television productions included Whistler and Big Sound. In 2001, Big Pictures, a division of S.L Feldman & Associates, produced the feature film Rare Birds.

In 2000, both Feldman and Allen were inducted into the B.C. Entertainment Walk of Fame, with their names appearing on Starwalk on Granville Street. A&F Music earned a record number of honors, with nominations in 53 categories at the Juno Awards and nine Grammy nominations, including three for jazz singer Diana Krall at the Grammy Awards. The S.L. Feldman & Associates roster continued to expand with clients such as Rush, Joni Mitchell, Leonard Cohen, Elvis Costello, Norah Jones, James Taylor, and Sarah McLachlan. Feldman purchased a 50% interest in New York-based agency Little Big Man Booking whose clients include the British band Coldplay, Robbie Williams, enabling access to the US market for his Canadian-based clients.

By 2007, S.L. Feldman & Associates represented 200 Canadian and international artists. At this stage, various divisions within A&F Music Ltd included Macklam Feldman Management, Bruce Allen Talent, Characters Talent Agency, Music Supervision Services, Big Pictures Entertainment, and Watchdog Management. The company employed 70 people in offices in Vancouver and Toronto. Sam Feldman and Bruce Allen served as talent producers for the 2010 Vancouver Winter Olympic Games opening and closing ceremonies.

By 2018, the agency was booking more than 2,500 events and shows per year. In 2019, A&F Music Ltd. sold its stake in the agency to two senior employees, so that Feldman could focus solely on artist management and other business activities. Feldman remains an active partner in Macklam Feldman Management.

== Awards ==
- Feldman won the Walt Grealis Special Achievement Award in 1998.
- He was honored by the Music Managers Forum of Canada in 2010, and he is an inductee of the BC Entertainment Hall of Fame.
- He was awarded the Order of British Columbia in 2023.

== Personal life ==
Feldman is married to film and TV producer Janet York. They have 5 children between them.
