= Touch by Touch (Diana Ross song) =

Single by Diana Ross

from the album Swept Away
- B-side: "Fight for It"
- Released: September 1984
- Genre: Pop
- Length: 4:13
- Label: Capitol
- Songwriters: Arthur Barrow; Joe Esposito; Richie Zito
- Producer: Diana Ross

Diana Ross singles chronology
"Swept Away" (1984)	"Touch by Touch" (1984)	"Missing You" (1984)

"Touch by Touch" is a song by American singer Diana Ross from her fifteenth studio album Swept Away (1984). The song was written by Arthur Barrow, Joe Esposito and Richie Zito; Ross herself produced the record.

The song was released as a single in some countries, where it performed well on the charts. In Belgium, the Netherlands and Norway, the song entered the top ten, but in the United Kingdom it reached only the 47th position. In the US, the song was never released as a single. RCA, deciding which song to make a single, hesitated between "Touch by Touch" and "Telephone", but chose the latter.

Diana Ross performed the song at the 14th American Music Awards on January 27, 1987.

== Critical reception ==
Stephen Thomas Erlewine from AllMusic called this song one of the best on the album. Paulette Weiss from Audio wrote: "'Touch by Touch' has some unique percussion work, with a slight Caribbean cast and a definite flair for the unusual synthesizer accent."

== Track listing ==
7" single
A. "Touch by Touch" – 4:13
B. "Fight for It" (Ray Chew, Bill Wray, Diana Ross, Peppy Castro) – 4:09

12" single
A1. "Touch by Touch" (Extended Mix) – 5:35
B1. "Fight for It" – 4:09
B2. "Touch by Touch" (Instrumental) – 5:15

== Charts ==
=== Weekly charts ===
Weekly chart performance for "Touch by Touch"
Chart (1984)	Peak position
Belgium (Ultratop 50 Flanders)	7
Europe (European Hot 100 Singles)	16
Netherlands (Dutch Top 40)	10
Netherlands (Single Top 100)	18
Norway (VG-lista)	10
Sweden (Sverigetopplistan)	11
UK Singles (OCC)	47
West Germany (GfK)	49

=== Year-end charts ===
Year-end chart performance for "Touch by Touch"
Chart (1984)	Position
Belgium (Ultratop 50 Flanders)	71
