= Street (band) =

American rock band

- Also known as: Anya's Street
- Origin: New York, United States
- Genres: psychedelic rock, Rock, pop
- Years active: 1960s – 1970
- Labels: Verve Forecast, Traffic
- Past members: Will Betz; Al Camardo; Tom Champion; Anya Cohen; Michael Lynn; John Williamson

Street was a rock group from New York that was around from the late 1960s to the early 1970s. They were fronted by female singer Anya Cohen and were managed by record producer Rick Shorter. They released a self-titled album and a couple of singles. They had a good degree of success with their single "One Kind Favor".

== Background ==
Described by Phil Morris of Record World as a hard driving rock group with an excellent vocalist Anya Cohen, Street were managed by Rick Shorter who also wrote some of their material and produced their recordings. Shorter discovered lead singer Anya Cohen at the Wee Spot Coffee Shop, a Rochester coffee house she was running. He set her up with a bunch of musicians that consisted of guitarists John Williamson and Will Betz. Bassist Michael Lynne, percussionist Alan Camarda and drummer Thomas Chamon. Prior to joining the group, Cohen spent three years at Eastman School of Music. She also played guitar herself and had played clubs and appeared on television.

By May 1968, they were the new group for the Verve Forecast label.

== Career ==
=== 1968 ===
Now having been signed to the Verve/Forecast label they still went by the name of Anya's Street. By May 11, 1968, their single "There's One Kind Favor" bw "Boeing 707" was due for immediate release. The single credited to Anya's Street was released on Verve Forecast KF5084. The A side was written by Jules Taub and Lightnin' Hopkins. The B side "Boeing 707" was composed by Shorter. "One Kind Favor" did quite well.

A live performance of the group was reviewed in the July, 20 issue of Cashbox. The songs played included "C.C. Rider", a medley of "If I Needed Someone - Tomorrow Is A Long Time", "If I Were a Carpenter", "The Eggplant That Ate Chicago", and "There’s One Kind Favor". The review was very good but reviewer did say that the arrangements on some of their songs were so strong that they made some others seem pale by comparison. The reviewer also said biggest and that they could blossom into one of the best live and disk attractions around. On September 15, they appeared at Wheels, a venue in New York. Fred Kirby of Billboard who wrote about their performance said that their first set was good. They opened with "See See Rider". The other numbers they covered were "Boeing 707", "Some Thoughts Of A Young Man's Girl", and "I Think I Care". They concluded with "If I Needed Someone" and "Tomorrow's A Long Long Long Time". Kirby's review of them was good, noting Anya Cohen's handling the material well, the drummers being steady and all five musicians being competent. He also commented on guitarist John Williamson and bassist Michael Lynn playing their instruments in counterpoint.

The group had played at Steve Paul's Scene in New York, The Bitter End in Greenwich Village. They also did a three-week stint at Wheels on New York's upper east side. On October 5, 1968, they appeared on Channel 11 's "Rock of New York" with James Brown and The Chambers Brothers.

Album release

The success of their engagements at New York discothèques, the airplay, "One Kind Favor" doing well etc., gave them an advantage to record their debut album. According to the July 20, 1968 issue of Cashbox Magazine, they had already begun work on their album. Their self-titled album was released that year on Verve Forecast FTS-3057. It included 5 Shorter compositions. They received a good review in Cashbox with the arrangements and instrumentalism recognized for their quality. There was potential for a wide appeal with the tracks, "There's One Kind Favor", "If I Needed Someone", "Tomorrow's A Long, Long Time", and "High Heel Sneakers" being its strong points. Hillard Pouncy of The Heights didn't give it a good review, saying that it was "A bland murky sound changed only by loudness and tempo, is all you hear". He also criticized the ability of the two guitarists. His criticism didn't stop there. He also was critical of the album, saying the guy in the gold lame jump suit floating off the ground bothered the eye. He did remark that Anya Cohen sounded like the female singer of We Five and also a young Grace Slick. When Fred Kirby from Billboard reviewed them playing live, he gave them a favorable review with no criticism of the playing.

=== 1969 ===
They released one more single in 1969 on the Traffic Records label, "Apollo... Amen" bw "Why Concern Yourself". Shorter composed both songs as well as producing and arranging the recordings.

In 1969, the Traffic Records label which was co-owned by Shorter and Barry Lane had entered into a deal in 1969 with RCA to distribute their recordings in Canada. This included work by Street and another group called TCB which Shorter also managed.

== Later years and other info ==
=== Unreleased recordings ===
One song from a recording session on April 1, 1968, was never released. The song was "I Got Something Money Can't Buy", when the group was still called Anya's Street. In August 1968, now known as Street, the group recorded a selection of songs. One was "She's Gonna Shine Tomorrow". The other was an unknown title.

== Members ==
- Will Betz - bass, electric guitar
- Al Camardo - percussion
- Tom Champion - drums, percussion
- Anya Cohen - vocals, percussion, tambourine
- Michael Lynn - bass, guitar, acoustic guitar, electric guitar, vocals
- John Williamson - bass, electric guitar, vocals

== Discography ==
Singles
Act	Title	Release info	Year	Notes
Anya's Street	"There's One Kind Favor" / "Boeing 707"	Verve Forecast KF-5084	1968	
Anya's Street	"I Got Something Money Can't Buy"	Verve Forecast	1968	Unissued
Street	"Apollo ... Amen" / "Why Concern Yourself"	Traffic Records TR-1001	1969	

Album
Title	Release info	Year	Notes
Street	Verve Forecast FTS 3057	1968	
