= Roman Records =

Roman Records was a Canadian record label based in Toronto, Ontario during the mid-to-late 1960s. It was founded by local radio disc jockey Duff Roman and his brother Danny Mostoway as a vehicle to record and release music by local artists, including David Clayton-Thomas and The Shays, Little Caesar and the Consuls, The Paupers, and Levon and the Hawks. After a few years, Duff Roman renewed his focus on a radio career and Roman Records stopped visible activities.
