= Shirley Matthews =

- Born: October 8, 1942; Harrow, Ontario, Canada
- Died: January 8, 2013 (aged 70) Toronto, Ontario, Canada
- Genres: Pop
- Occupations: Singer; CEO
- Labels: Tamarac; Amy; Red Leaf

Shirley Matthews (October 8th,1942 – January 8th, 2013) was a Canadian pop singer.

Matthews sang in a church choir and at high school dances prior to embarking on a career in music. She worked in a Bell Telephone office while singing nights at the Club Bluenote in Toronto. Her debut single, "Big Town Boy", was a major hit in Canada in 1964, selling over a million copies. She won the RPM Gold Leaf Award for Female Vocalist of the Year in 1964. Later singles failed to duplicate "Big Town Boy"'s success.

"Big Town Boy" debuted on 1050 CHUM in Toronto on 2 December 1963, the same day as the Beatles' "She Loves You".

In 1967, she married, taking the name Shirley Vedder, and quit the music industry, eventually becoming the president of a chain of tennis, squash and fitness clubs in Toronto and Markham, Mayfair Clubs.

On January 8, 2013, Matthews died in Toronto, Ontario.
