= Stan Klees =

Canadian businessman (1932–2023)

- Born: 29 April 1932
- Died: 22 September 2023 (aged 91)
- Occupations: Music industry executive, record producer, graphic designer

Stan Klees (29 April 1932 – 22 September 2023) was a Canadian music industry businessman. He created the music recording companies Tamarac and Red Leaf Records in the 1960s.

== Career ==
A native of Toronto, Ontario, Klees was a presenter at CHUM radio in the late 1940s then was employed by London Records. He founded Tamarac Records in 1963.

His advice to Walt Grealis led to the development of RPM Weekly in 1964. A frequent contributor from the magazine's inception, Klees formally joined RPM as a staff member in 1971 to assist with organisation and publication design. He also designed the "MAPL" logo to identify Canadian content of produced songs, also known as the Cancon movement. Klees and Grealis established RPM's annual awards for Canadian music in 1964 which led to the creation of the Juno Awards ceremonies in 1970.

In 1995, Klees was inducted into the Canadian Country Music Hall of Fame.

In 2001, he was awarded the Special Achievement Award at the SOCAN Awards in Toronto.

Klees died in his sleep on 22 September 2023, at the age of 91.
