= Walt Grealis =

Canadian publisher (1929–2004)

Walt Grealis OC
- Grealis in 1953
- Born: 18 February 1929; Toronto, Ontario
- Died: 20 January 2004 (aged 74); Toronto, Ontario
- Occupation: Publisher
- Known for: Juno Awards, RPM

Walter Grealis (18 February 1929 – 20 January 2004) was a Canadian publisher and music industry leader. With partner Stan Klees, he co-founded Canada's national music honours, the Juno Awards. As an ardent supporter of Canadian music, Grealis is credited with coining the term CanCon.

== History ==
Grealis was born in Toronto and attended Central High School of Commerce in that city until Grade 10. His initial career was in law enforcement, first as a Royal Canadian Mounted Police officer then from 1952 as a Toronto city police officer.

== Music career ==
He entered the music industry in 1960 after leaving policing and trying various careers in the late 1950s. He founded Canadian music industry magazine RPM in February 1964, publishing weekly for most of its existence until November 2000.

With partner Stan Klees, the Gold Leaf Awards were founded to honour Canadian music industry achievements. From 1964 to 1969, winners were announced in RPM at the end of each year. In 1970, this was expanded to a formal ceremonial event and renamed to Juno Awards later that year.

== Honours ==
Grealis was appointed an Officer of the Order of Canada in 1993. In 1999, Grealis was inducted into the Canadian Country Music Hall of Fame. At the Juno Awards of 2004, he was posthumously honoured with the music industry achievement award named the Walt Grealis Special Achievement Award.

== Later life ==
Grealis, a non-smoker, died at his home in 2004 following several years of lung cancer.

== See also ==
- Music of Canada
- Juno Award
- RPM
