= Skip Prokop =

Canadian musical artist (1943–2017)

- Prokop in 1974

Background information
- Born: Ronald Harry Prokop; 13 December 1943; Hamilton, Ontario, Canada
- Died: 30 August 2017 (aged 73) St. Thomas, Ontario, Canada
- Genres: Rock, jazz fusion, smooth jazz
- Occupations: Drummer, bandleader
- Instruments: Drums, percussion
- Formerly of: Lighthouse, the Paupers

Ronald Harry "Skip" Prokop (December 13, 1943 – August 30, 2017) was a Canadian drummer. He was also a band leader, was a founding member of the Canadian rock music groups the Paupers and Lighthouse.

== Early life ==
Prokop was born in Hamilton, Ontario. He attended G.L. Armstrong Elementary and Hill Park Secondary School schools. He was active in the Navy League and Sea Cadets, and at age 17 performed in a drum corps which won the Canadian National Individual Drumming Competition.

== Career ==
Prokop moved to Toronto and organized a band called the Spats, later called the Paupers, who began playing in Yorkville coffee houses, and later performed in New York and at the U.S. Monterey Pop Festival in 1967. The Paupers were managed by Albert Grossman. He introduced Prokop to Al Kooper. Grossman asked him to leave the Paupers to play drums with Kooper and Mike Bloomfield for a follow-up recording to Super Session. The result was The Live Adventures of Mike Bloomfield and Al Kooper, a live late-1960s blues-rock album.

Prokop played on a number of sessions, including one with Janis Joplin at RKO Studios following her parting with Big Brother & the Holding Company. This came about because Grossman had asked him to put a new band together for Joplin. He also drummed on sessions with Carlos Santana and Peter, Paul & Mary and other musical artists.

In 1969, Prokop co-founded the rock group Lighthouse with Paul Hoffert. The band played its first Toronto concert in May that year. The group was active until 1975; they performed internationally and won several Juno Awards.

He wrote the song "I'd Be So Happy", which was recorded by Three Dog Night in 1974, featured on their studio album Hard Labor, and included on their greatest hits compilation, Joy to the World: Their Greatest Hits later that year.

Lighthouse held a reunion concert at Ontario Place in Toronto in 1982.

In the mid 1980s Prokop worked for Roland Canada (Musical Instruments), in Mississauga, Ontario, as a product specialist. He participated in several promotional tours with his own Skip Prokop Band while presenting products made by Roland.

Prokop also drummed in a London, Ontario rock/funk/Christian band called Mercy Train, and worked on smooth jazz album with IAM Studios in Brantford, Ontario, released in 2012 titled The Smooth Side Of Skip Prokop.

During the years in which Lighthouse was inactive, Prokop turned towards radio for his career. He was host of CFNY-FM's Rock and a Hard Place program in the Toronto broadcast market. In the early 2000s, he worked for Astral Media radio stations CJBX/CIQM/CJBK in advertising sales. As of 2010, he lived in Aylmer, Ontario.

He died on August 30, 2017, at age 73.

== Albums ==
Year	Album	Album details	Peak chart positions
Year	Album	Album details	CAN
1977	All Growed Up	Released: 1977; Label: Quality	—
2005	in the center of...	Released: 2005; Label: Race Records	—
2012	Smoothside	Released: June 29, 2012; Label: IAM Music	—
"—" denotes a recording that did not chart or was not released in that territory.

== Singles ==
Year	Name	Peak chart positions	Album
Year	Name	CAN	Album
1977	"Sunny New Orleans"	— (Note: Although "Sunny New Orleans" failed to chart, the song received considerable airplay in Canada.)	All Growed Up
1978	"Gotta Hear You Say It Too"	Promo only	Non-album single
"—" denotes a recording that did not chart or was not released in that territory.
