= Gary Slaight =

Canadian broadcasting executive and philanthropist

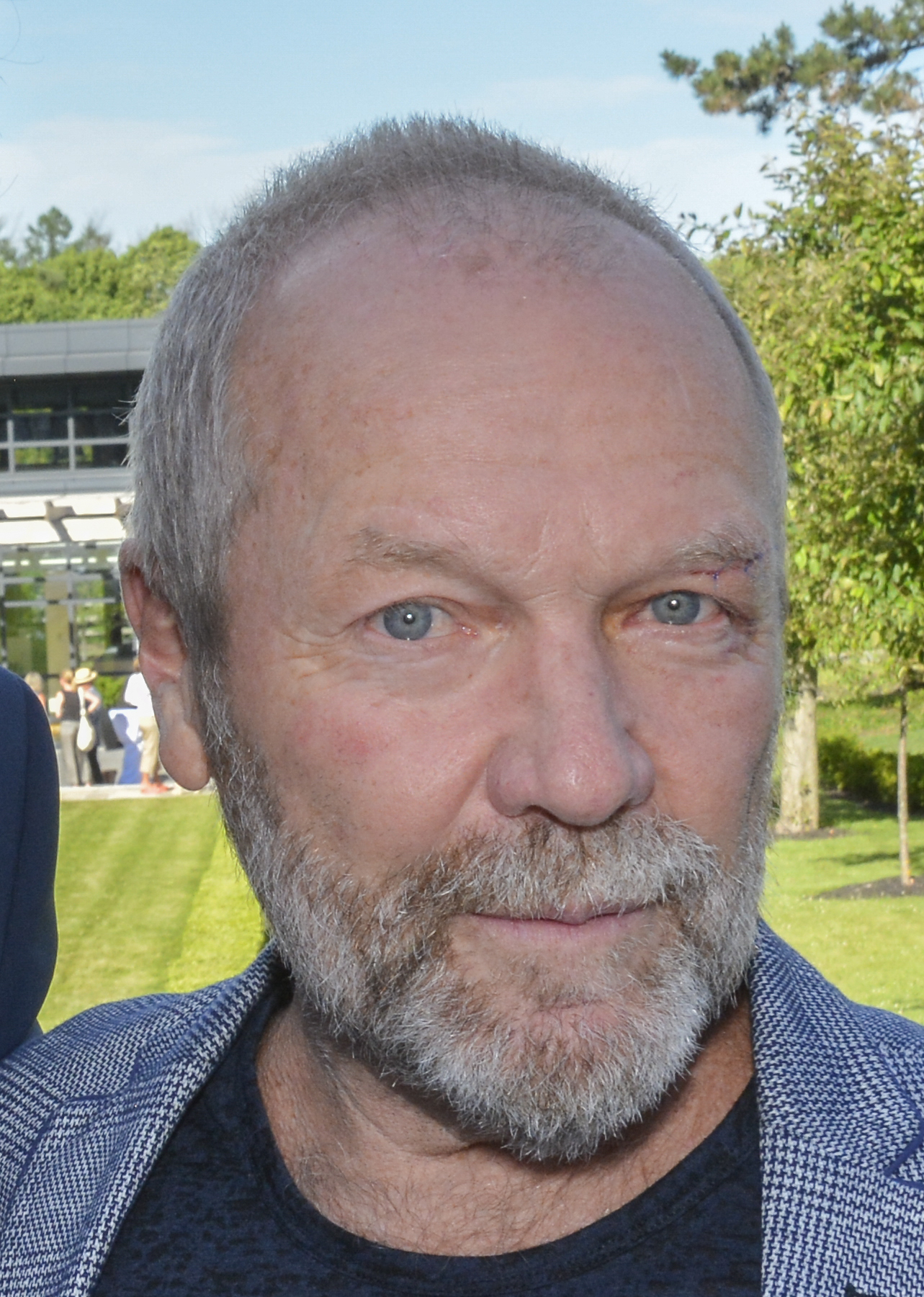
Slaight in 2016 at the Canadian Film Centre in Toronto

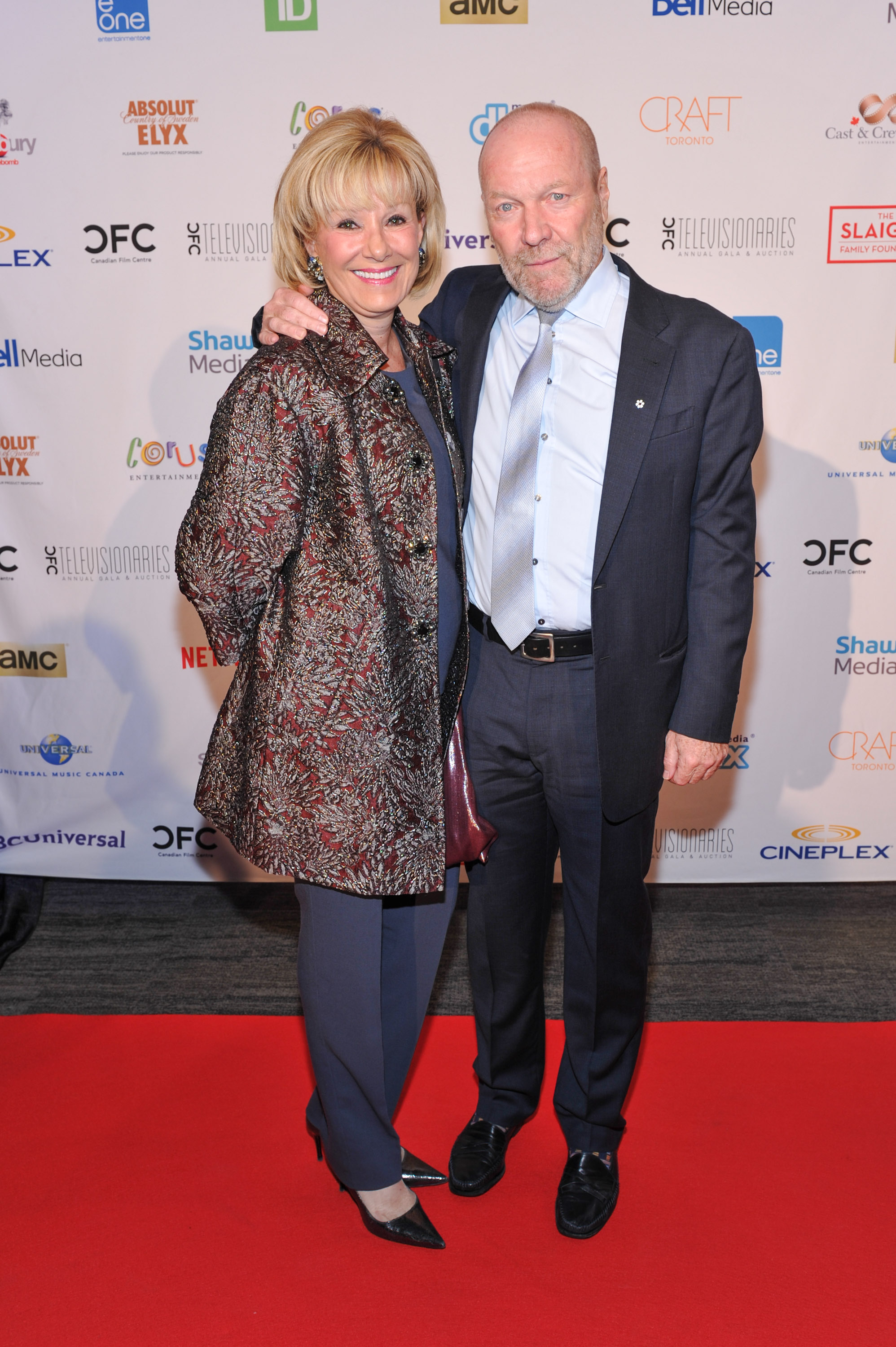
Slaight in 2015 with his wife, Donna

Gary Slaight CM OOnt (born February 15, 1951) is a Canadian broadcasting executive and philanthropist, most noted for his efforts to develop and support the Canadian music industry. He is currently the chief executive officer of Slaight Communications, a firm which is a minority investor in SiriusXM Canada, and of Slaight Music, a talent development and promotional firm which funds projects in artist development, music publishing and digital music distribution as well as serving as a key partner in the Juno Awards, the Polaris Music Prize, the Canadian Country Music Awards and the Prism Prize.

== Career ==
The son of radio executive Allan Slaight, Gary Slaight began his career in the media department of McLaren Advertising, and worked in music promotion for Quality Records and WEA, before joining his father's company (then known as Slaight Broadcasting) in 1977 as program director of CILQ-FM (Q107). Although Slaight Broadcasting sold Q107 to Western International Communications in 1985, Gary Slaight remained with the station until 1987, when he rejoined his father's renamed Standard Broadcasting as program director of CKFM-FM and head of the company's radio division.

In his role as a radio program director, he was a passionate defender of Canadian content regulations, telling the media that most radio stations would likely not provide any airplay support to emerging Canadian musicians without the rule; in his role as head of Standard Radio, he launched one of Canada's first major commercial ventures into web broadcasting when nine Standard Radio stations launched webstreams in 2000 on what would eventually become Iceberg Radio.

He succeeded his father as president and CEO of Standard Broadcasting in 2000, holding this role until Standard sold all of its terrestrial radio assets to Astral Media in 2007. The remaining remnants of Standard Broadcasting, including Iceberg Radio and its minority stakes in SiriusXM Canada and other radio ownership groups, became the contemporary Slaight Communications.

As an active supporter of Canadian musical talent, he was also instrumental in the creation of the National Songwriting Contest, the Canadian Radio Music Awards, and the annual Homegrown Contest to promote and publicize emerging local bands through radio station "battle of the bands" contests in radio markets served by Standard Broadcasting.

Through the separate Slaight Family Foundation, he has also made philanthropic contributions to projects such as the Slaight Family Music Lab at the Canadian Film Centre, the Slaight Family Polaris Heritage Prize to honour classic Canadian albums released prior to the creation of the Polaris Music Prize, the renovation of Massey Hall, international development projects to improve access for women and girls in developing countries to health care, education and legal support, and Canadian food banks during the COVID-19 pandemic in Canada.

He has also been producer or executive producer of a number of films, including I Saw the Light, The Journey Is the Destination, Girl Unbound: The War to Be Her and Gordon Lightfoot: If You Could Read My Mind.

== Honours ==
He was inducted into the Canadian Association of Broadcasters Hall of Fame in 2009, and was named a Member of the Order of Canada in 2014. He was the recipient of the Walt Grealis Special Achievement Award at the Juno Awards of 2012, and the Juno Humanitarian Award at the Juno Awards of 2018. In January 2024, he was appointed to the Order of Ontario.
