= It's Your Move (song) =

1983 song by Doug Parkinson

Song by Doug Parkinson

from the album Heartbeat to Heartbeat
- Released: 28 March 1983
- Genre: Soft rock
- Label: Columbia
- Songwriters: Steve Kipner; Terry Shaddick
- Producer: Tommy Emmanuel

"It's Your Move" is a song by Doug Parkinson, released in March 1983 on the album Heartbeat to Heartbeat.

== America version ==
"Your Move"

Single by America

from the album Your Move
- B-side: "Love's Worn Out Again"
- Released: June 1983
- Recorded: 1983
- Studio: Abbey Road Studios, London
- Genre: Soft rock
- Length: 3:19
- Label: Capitol
- Songwriters: Steve Kipner; Terry Shaddick

A few months after the song's initial release, it was released by the band America, retitled "Your Move", from their album of the same name. It was released as a 7" single in Italy on Capitol Records.

== Diana Ross version ==
"It's Your Move"

Song by Diana Ross

from the album Swept Away
- Released: 13 September 1984
- Genre: Synth-pop
- Length: 3:34
- Label: RCA
- Songwriters: Steve Kipner; Terry Shaddick

In 1984, Diana Ross covered the song. It appears on the album Swept Away. This version was later sampled in the 2011 vaporwave song "リサフランク420 / 現代のコンピュー" ("Lisa Frank 420 / Modern Computing") by Macintosh Plus, where it was slowed down and chopped and screwed, with the pitch changed. It became an Internet meme worldwide, and is to date one of the most emblematic songs of the vaporwave genre.
