= Verve Forecast Records =

Record label

Verve Forecast
- Parent company: Universal Music Group
- Founded: 1967
- Founder: Jerry Schoenbaum
- Distributor: Verve
- Genre: Various
- Country of origin: United States
- Official website: verveforecast.com

Verve Forecast is a record label formed as a division of Verve Records to concentrate on pop, rock, and folk music.

== Founding ==
Jerry Schoenbaum of Verve and Moe Asch of Folkways created Verve Folkways in 1964 to take advantage of the popularity of folk music. To broaden the label's appeal, the named was changed from Verve Folkways to Verve Forecast in 1967. Schoenbaum was president of the label.

== History ==
Schoenbaum left in 1969 and Verve Forecast was closed by its parent company, MGM, in 1970. After PolyGram bought MGM Records, the Verve Forecast catalog (as well as the entire MGM Records catalog) was incorporated into Polydor. The label was revived in the 1990s for smooth jazz releases by Chris Botti, Jeff Lorber, and Will Downing. When PolyGram merged with MCA Records to become Universal, the imprint was deactivated and its roster was transferred to GRP. In 2004, Verve Forecast was revived again to replace Blue Thumb Records to handle acts outside of jazz.

== Roster ==
Verve Forecast signed pop, rock, folk, and blues musicians including The Blues Project, Caravan, James Cotton, Friend & Lover, Tim Hardin, Richie Havens, The Hombres, John Lee Hooker, Lightnin' Hopkins, Janis Ian, Jim and Jean, Lead Belly, Bob Lind, The New Lost City Ramblers, Laura Nyro, Odetta, Street, Dave Van Ronk and Shakatak.

After 2004, Blues Traveler, Jamie Cullum, Dion, Jesse Harris, Katharine McPhee, Mandy Moore, Peter One, Tank and the Bangas, Susan Tedeschi, Teddy Thompson, Trombone Shorty, and Lizz Wright recorded for the label.
