= RPM (magazine) =

Canadian music industry publication

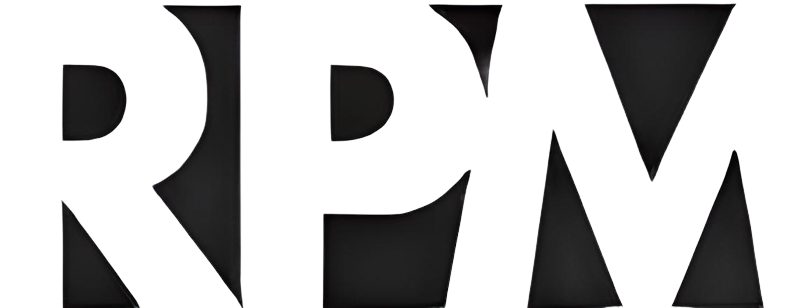

- Cover for the final issue of RPM
- Editor: Walt Grealis
- Categories: Music magazine
- Frequency: Weekly
- First issue: 24 February 1964
- Final issue Number: 13 November 2000; Volume 71, No. 27
- Company: RPM
- Country: Canada
- Website: RPM homepage
- ISSN: 0315-5994

RPM (ISSN 0315-5994 and later ISSN 0033-7064) was a Canadian music-industry publication that featured song and album charts for Canada. The publication was founded by Walt Grealis in February 1964, supported through its existence by record label owner Stan Klees. RPM ceased publication in November 2000.

RPM stood for "Records, Promotion, Music". The magazine's title varied over the years, including RPM Weekly and RPM Magazine.

== Background ==
In 1964, Harriett Wasser came on board as the magazine's New York correspondent. She was no stranger to the music industry and had been associated with many prominent figures in the industry, including Bobby Darin and Bob Crewe. The address at the time for correspondence was Harriet Wasser, 161 West 54th Street, Suite 1202, New York, N.Y. 10019. An example of her work can be seen on page 5 of the 9 October 1964 edition of R. P. M., in DATELINE NEW YORK by Harriet Wasser.

== Discontinuation ==
In the fall of 2000, faced with changing advertising policies that made continuing virtually impossible, the decision was made to cease publication for RPM.

== Canadian music charts ==
RPM maintained several format charts, including Top Singles (all genres), Adult Contemporary, Dance, Urban, Rock/Alternative, and Country Tracks (or Top Country Tracks) for country music. On 21 March 1966, RPM expanded its Top Singles chart from 40 positions to 100. On 6 December 1980, the main chart became a top-50 chart and remained this way until 4 August 1984, whereupon it reverted to a top-100 singles chart.

For the first several weeks of its existence, the magazine did not compile a national chart, but simply printed the current airplay lists of several major-market top-40 stations. A national chart was introduced in 22 June 1964 issue, and the first national number-one single was "Chapel of Love" by the Dixie Cups. Prior to the introduction of RPM's national chart, the CHUM Chart issued by Toronto radio station CHUM was considered the de facto national chart. The final number-one single in the magazine's chart was "Music" by Madonna.

RPM's Top Singles chart was initially based on airplay and record company reports. Beginning in June 1964, the chart began factoring in record store sales reports. In September 1988, RPM began basing their Top Singles chart solely on airplay.

== The RPM Awards ==
The modern Juno Awards had their origins in an annual survey conducted by RPM since its founding year. Readers of the magazine were invited to mail in survey ballots to indicate their choices under various categories of people or companies.

The RPM Awards poll was transformed into a formal awards ceremony, the Gold Leaf Awards, in 1970. These became the Juno Awards in following years.

=== 1964 RPM Awards ===
The RPM Awards for 1964 were announced in the 28 December 1964 issue:

- Top male vocalist: Terry Black
- Top female singer: Shirley Matthews
- Most promising male vocalist: Jack London
- Most promising female vocalist: Linda Layne
- Top vocal instrumental group: The Esquires
- Top female vocal group: The Girlfriends
- Top instrumental group: Wes Dakus & The Rebels
- Top folk group: The Courriers
- Top country male singer: Gary Buck
- Top country female singer: Pat Hervey
- Industry man of the year: Johnny Murphy of Cashbox Canada
- Top record company: Capitol Records of Canada
- Top Canadian Content record company: Capitol Records of Canada
- Top national record promoter: Paul White, Capitol Records of Canada
- Top regional record promoter: Ed Lawson, Quality Records
- Top album of the year (GMP): That Girl by Phyllis Marshall

A column on page 6 of that issue noted that the actual vote winner for Top Canadian Content record company was disqualified due to a conflict of interest involving an employee of that company who was also working for RPM. Therefore, runner-up Capitol Records was declared the category's winner.

=== 1965 RPM Awards ===
The Annual RPM Awards for 1965 were announced in the 17 January 1966 issue, with more country music categories than the previous year:

- Top male vocalist: Bobby Curtola
- Top female singer: Catherine McKinnon
- Most promising male vocalist: Barry Allen
- Most promising female vocalist: Debbie Lori Kaye
- Top vocal/instrumental group: The Guess Who
- Top female vocal group: Girlfriends
- Top instrumental group: Wes Dakus and the Rebels
- Top folk group: Malka and Joso
- Top folk singer: Gordon Lightfoot
- Best produced single: "My Girl Sloopy", Little Caesar and the Consuls
- Best produced album: Voice of an Angel by Catherine McKinnon
- Top country male singer: Gary Buck
- Top country female singer: Dianne Leigh
- Most promising country male singer: Angus Walker
- Most promising country female singer: Sharon Strong
- Top country instrumental vocal group: Rhythm Pals
- Top country instrumentalist: Roy Penney
- Top country radio personality: Al Fisher, CFGM Toronto
- Top Canadian disc jockey: Chuck Benson, CKYL Peace River
- Top record company: Capitol Records of Canada
- Top Canadian Content record company: Capitol Records of Canada
- Top national record promoter: Paul White, Capitol Records of Canada
- Top regional record promoter: Charlie Camilleri, Quality Records

=== 1966 RPM Awards ===
The winners were:

- Top male vocalist: Barry Allen
- Top female singer: Catherine McKinnon
- Most promising male vocalist: Jimmy Dybold
- Most promising female vocalist: Lynda Lane
- Top vocal/instrumental group: Staccatos
- Top female vocal group: Allan Sisters
- Top folk group: 3's a Crowd
- Top folk singer: Gordon Lightfoot
- Best produced single: "Let's Run Away", Staccatos
- Top country male singer: Gary Buck
- Top country female singer: Dianne Leigh
- Most promising country male singer: Johnny Burke
- Most promising country female singer: Debbie Lori Kaye
- Top country instrumental vocal group: Mercey Brothers
- Top country instrumentalist: Roy Penney
- Top country radio personality: Ted Daigle
- Top country radio station: CFGM
- Top record company: Capitol Records of Canada
- Top Canadian Content record company: Red Leaf Records
- Top national record promoter: Paul White, Capitol Records of Canada
- Top regional record promoter: Alexander Mair
- Top Canadian music industry man of the year: Stan Klees

== See also ==
- Juno Awards
- List of number-one singles in Canada
- List of RPM number-one alternative rock singles
- List of RPM number-one country singles
- List of RPM number-one dance singles
