= Blood, Sweat & Tears discography =

- Studio albums: 11
- Soundtrack albums: 1
- Live albums: 5
- Compilation albums: 16
- Singles: 23

This is the discography of American jazz-rock group Blood, Sweat & Tears.

== Albums ==
=== Studio albums ===
Title	Album details	Peak chart positions											Certifications
Title	Album details	US	US R&B	AUS	CAN	FIN	GER	NL	NOR	SPA	SWE	UK	Certifications
Child Is Father to the Man	Released: February 21, 1968; Label: Columbia; Formats: LP, MC, 8-track, reel-to-reel	47	—	—	—	—	—	—	—	—	—	40	US: Gold
Blood, Sweat & Tears	Released: December 11, 1968; Label: Columbia; Formats: LP, MC, 8-track, reel-to-reel	1	15	4	1	8	—	7	3	5	—	15	US: 4× Platinum
Blood, Sweat & Tears 3	Released: June 1970; Label: Columbia; Formats: LP, MC, 8-track, reel-to-reel	1	35	6	1	14	39	7	5	6	10	14	US: Gold
B, S & T 4	Released: June 1971; Label: Columbia; Formats: LP, MC, 8-track, reel-to-reel	10	—	20	7	18	50	—	11	6	4	—	US: Gold
New Blood	Released: October 1972; Label: Columbia; Formats: LP, MC, 8-track	32	—	62	14	—	—	—	16	—	3	—	
No Sweat	Released: August 1973; Label: Columbia; Formats: LP, MC, 8-track	72	—	—	—	—	—	—	—	—	6	—	
Mirror Image	Released: July 1974; Label: Columbia; Formats: LP, MC, 8-track	149	—	—	—	—	—	—	—	—	11	—	
New City	Released: April 1975; Label: Columbia; Formats: LP, MC, 8-track	47	—	—	66	—	—	—	20	—	—	—	
More Than Ever	Released: July 1976; Label: Columbia; Formats: LP, MC, 8-track	165	—	—	—	—	—	—	—	—	—	—	
Brand New Day	Released: November 1977; Label: ABC; Formats: LP, MC, 8-track	205	—	—	—	—	—	—	—	—	—	—	
Nuclear Blues	Released: March 1980; Label: LAX/MCA; Formats: LP, MC	— (Note: Nuclear Blues didn't enter the Billboard 200, but did peak at number 184 on the Record World Albums chart.)	—	—	—	—	—	—	—	—	—	—	
"—" denotes releases that did not chart or were not released in that territory.

=== Live albums ===
Title	Album details
In Concert	Released: 1976; Label: CBS; Formats: 2xLP, MC
Live and Improvised	Released: May 7, 1991; Label: Columbia/Legacy; Formats: 2xCD
Live	Released: February 1995; Label: Avenue/Rhino; Formats: CD
Sail Away: Live in Stockholm 1973	Released: June 29, 2010; Label: Immortal Music; Formats: CD
Live at Woodstock	Released: July 26, 2019; Label: Columbia/Legacy; Formats: digital download
What The Hell Happened To Blood, Sweat & Tears? (Live Performances 1970)	Released: January 19, 2023; Label: Omnivore Recordings; Formats: CD, LP, digital download

=== Soundtrack albums ===
Title	Album details	Peak chart positions
Title	Album details	US
The Owl and the Pussycat	Released: December 1970; Label: Columbia; Formats: LP, MC, 8-track	186
What the Hell Happened To Blood, Sweat & Tears? (Original Score)	Released: April 2023; Label: Omnivore Recordings; Formats: digital download	

=== Compilation albums ===
Title	Album details	Peak chart positions			Certifications
Title	Album details	US	AUS	CAN	Certifications
Greatest Hits	Released: February 1972; Label: Columbia; Formats: LP, MC, 8-track, reel-to-reel	19	44	12	CAN: Platinum; US: 2× Platinum
Classic B, S & T	Released: April 1980; Label: CBS; Formats: LP, MC	—	—	—	
The Very Best of Blood Sweat & Tears	Released: 1981; Label: J&B; Formats: LP, MC	—	60	—	
Found Treasures	Released: February 12, 1990; Label: Sony Music; Formats: CD, MC	—	—	—	
The Collection	Released: September 16, 1993; Label: Castle Communications; Formats: CD, MC	—	—	—	
What Goes Up! The Best of Blood, Sweat & Tears	Released: November 7, 1995; Label: Columbia; Formats: 2xCD	—	—	—	
Definitive Collection	Released: December 8, 1995; Label: Columbia; Formats: CD, 2xCD	—	—	—	
Super Hits	Released: July 21, 1998; Label: Columbia/Legacy; Formats: CD, MC	—	—	—	
You've Made Me So Happy	Released: April 17, 2001; Label: Columbia; Formats: CD, MC	—	—	—	
Spinning Wheel – The Best of Blood, Sweat & Tears	Released: November 19, 2007; Label: Sony BMG; Formats: CD	—	—	—	
Original Album Classics	Released: March 30, 2009; Label: Columbia/Legacy/Sony Music; Formats: 5xCD box set	—	—	—	
Rare, Rarer & Rarest	Released: July 2, 2013; Label: Wounded Bird; Formats: CD, digital download	—	—	—	
The Complete Columbia Singles	Released: January 7, 2014; Label: Real Gone Music; Formats: 2xCD	—	—	—	
The Essential Blood, Sweat & Tears	Released: April 4, 2014; Label: Columbia; Formats: digital download	—	—	—	
Playlist: The Very Best of Blood, Sweat & Tears	Released: September 23, 2014; Label: Columbia/Legacy; Formats: CD, digital download	—	—	—	
Bloodlines	Released: May 5, 2017; Label: Analogue Productions; Formats: 4xLP/SACD box set	—	—	—	
"—" denotes releases that did not chart or were not released in that territory.

== Singles ==
Title	Year	Peak chart positions										Certifications	Album
Title	Year	US BB	US AC	US R&B	AUS	BE (FLA)	CAN	NL	NZ	SPA	UK	Certifications	Album
"I Can't Quit Her"	1968	—	—	—	—	—	—	—	—	—	—		Child Is Father to the Man
"You've Made Me So Very Happy"	1969	2	18	46	14	—	1	—	—	—	35	US: Gold	Blood, Sweat & Tears
"Spinning Wheel"	1969	2	1	45	5	—	1	18	6	—	—	US: Gold	Blood, Sweat & Tears
"Smiling Phases" (Europe-only release)	1969	—	—	—	—	—	—	—	—	—	—		Blood, Sweat & Tears
"And When I Die"	1969	2	4	—	4	—	1	—	1	—	—	US: Gold	Blood, Sweat & Tears
"Hi-De-Ho"	1970	14	14	—	18	20	5	9	14	24	—		Blood, Sweat & Tears 3
"Lucretia Mac Evil"	1970	29	39	—	43	—	10	—	—	—	—		Blood, Sweat & Tears 3
"Go Down Gamblin'"	1971	32	—	—	75	—	8	—	—	—	—		B, S & T 4
"Lisa, Listen to Me"	1971	73	33	—	—	—	52	—	—	—	—		B, S & T 4
"So Long Dixie"	1972	44	—	—	—	—	40	—	—	—	—		New Blood
"Touch Me" (UK-only release)	1972	—	—	—	—	—	—	—	—	—	—		New Blood
"I Can't Move No Mountains"	1972	103	—	—	—	—	70	—	—	—	—		New Blood
"Back Up Against the Wall" (UK and Europe-only release)	1973	—	—	—	—	—	—	—	—	—	—		No Sweat
"Roller Coaster"	1973	— (Note: "Roller Coaster" didn't enter the Billboard Hot 100, but did peak at number 90 on the Cash Box Top 100 Singles.)	—	—	—	—	—	—	—	—	—		No Sweat
"Save Our Ship"	1973	—	—	—	—	—	—	—	—	—	—		No Sweat
"Tell Me That I'm Wrong"	1974	83	—	—	—	—	—	—	—	—	—		Mirror Image
"Love Looks Good on You (You're Candy Sweet)" (UK and Portugal-only release)	1974	—	—	—	—	—	—	—	—	—	—		Mirror Image
"Got to Get You into My Life"	1975	62	—	—	94	—	59	—	—	—	—		New City
"Yesterday's Music"	1975	—	—	—	—	—	72	—	—	—	—		New City
"You're the One"	1976	106	6	—	93	—	89	—	—	—	—		More Than Ever
"Blue Street"	1977	—	—	—	—	—	—	—	—	—	—		Brand New Day
"Dreaming as One" (featuring Chaka Khan; France and Netherlands-only release)	1978	—	—	—	—	—	—	—	—	—	—		Brand New Day
"Nuclear Blues"	1980	—	—	—	—	—	—	—	—	—	—		Nuclear Blues
"—" denotes releases that did not chart or were not released in that territory.
