= Greatest Hits (Blood, Sweat & Tears album) =

Greatest hits album by Blood, Sweat & Tears
- Released: February 1972
- Recorded: 1967–1971
- Genre: Jazz-Rock
- Length: 40:55 (original)
- Label: Columbia PC 31170
- Producer: Bobby Colomby, James William Guercio, Roy Halee, John Simon

Blood, Sweat & Tears chronology
Blood, Sweat & Tears 4 (1971)	Greatest Hits (1972)	New Blood (1972)

Greatest Hits is a compilation album by the band Blood, Sweat & Tears, initially released in February 1972.

Although Blood, Sweat & Tears continued to record and tour for several more years, the band's lineup changed dramatically after Blood, Sweat & Tears 4. This compilation album includes all of the group's best-known material up to that time. This was the group's last album to earn a Gold Record certification.

Columbia initially chose to incorporate the edited single versions of many of the songs, a decision which was poorly received by some fans. Some later compact disc releases replaced the single versions with the full-length album versions.

In 1999 the album was remastered and re-released on CD with two bonus tracks - "So Long Dixie" and "More And More". In 2016, Audio Fidelity released a Super Audio CD version with the single versions as in the original release. This was a numbered limited edition mastered by Steve Hoffman and Stephen Marsh.

== Reception ==
Professional ratings
Review scores
Source	Rating
AllMusic	4.5/5 stars
Christgau's Record Guide	C

Writing for AllMusic, critic William Ruhlman wrote the album "captures the band's peak in 11 selections—seven singles chart entries, plus two album tracks from the celebrated debut album when Al Kooper helmed the group, and two more from the Grammy-winning multi-platinum second album... For the millions who learned to love BS&T in 1969 when they were all over AM radio, this is the ideal selection of their most accessible material." Music critic Robert Christgau's commented "their pop success does them more good in Vegas than on the radio, and only four of these eleven cuts made top twenty."

== Track listing ==
The original LP and CD releases include the following eleven tracks in the order listed.

Side one
No.	Title	Writer(s)	Original album	Length
1.	"You've Made Me So Very Happy" (single version)	Berry Gordy Jr.; Brenda Holloway; Patrice Holloway; Frank Wilson	Blood, Sweat & Tears (1968)	3:29
2.	"I Can't Quit Her"	Al Kooper; Irwin Levine	Child Is Father to the Man (1968)	3:38
3.	"Go Down Gamblin'" (single version)	David Clayton-Thomas	Blood, Sweat & Tears 4 (1971)	2:46
4.	"Hi-De-Ho" (single version)	Gerry Goffin; Carole King	Blood, Sweat & Tears 3 (1970)	3:59
5.	"Sometimes In Winter"	Steve Katz	Blood, Sweat & Tears	3:07
6.	"And When I Die" (single version)	Laura Nyro	Blood, Sweat & Tears	3:26

Side two
No.	Title	Writer(s)	Original album	Length
7.	"Spinning Wheel" (single version)	David Clayton-Thomas	Blood, Sweat & Tears	2:40
8.	"Lisa, Listen To Me"	Dick Halligan; David Clayton-Thomas	Blood, Sweat & Tears 4	2:58
9.	"I Love You More Than You'll Ever Know"	Al Kooper	Child Is Father to the Man	5:56
10.	"Lucretia Mac Evil"	David Clayton-Thomas	Blood, Sweat & Tears 3	3:04
11.	"God Bless the Child"	Billie Holiday, Arthur Herzog Jr.	Blood, Sweat & Tears	5:52
Total length:				40:55

1999 reissue CD bonus tracks
No.	Title	Writer(s)	Original album	Length
12.	"So Long Dixie"	Barry Mann; Cynthia Weil	New Blood (1972)	4:26
13.	"More And More"	Don Juan Mancha; Pelagio Agustin Valdez	Blood, Sweat & Tears	2:40
Total length:				48:01

== Personnel ==
- David Clayton-Thomas - lead vocals except as noted, guitar on "Go Down Gamblin'"
- Steve Katz - electric guitar, acoustic guitar, harmonica, mandolin, vocals, lead vocals on "Sometimes In Winter"
- Jim Fielder - bass guitar
- Al Kooper - Piano, organ, lead vocals on "I Can't Quit Her" and " I Love You More Than You'll Ever Know"
- Dick Halligan - organ, piano, electric piano, harpsichord, celeste, trombone, flute, alto flute, baritone horn, vocals
- Fred Lipsius - piano, organ, alto saxophone, clarinet, vocals
- Lew Soloff - trumpet, flugelhorn, piccolo trumpet
- Jerry Weiss - trumpet, flugelhorn, vocals
- Chuck Winfield - trumpet, flugelhorn
- Randy Brecker - trumpet, flugelhorn
- Dave Bargeron - trombone, tuba, bass trombone, baritone horn, acoustic bass
- Jerry Hyman - trombone, bass trombone, recorder
- Bobby Colomby - drums, percussion, vocals

== Charts ==
Chart (1972)	Peak position
US Top LPs (Billboard)	19
