= Super Hits (Blood, Sweat & Tears album) =

Compilation album by Blood Sweat & Tears
- Released: July 21, 1998
- Recorded: 1967–1973
- Genre: Rock
- Length: 44:29
- Label: Columbia CK 65632
- Producers: James William Guercio, John Simon, Steve Tyrell, Don Heckman, Bobby Colomby, Roy Halee

Super Hits is a budget compilation album by the band Blood, Sweat & Tears released by Columbia Records in 1998. This ten song collection draws four songs from each of the band's first two albums Child Is Father to the Man and Blood, Sweat & Tears.

== Reception ==
Professional ratings
Review scores
Source	Rating
Allmusic	3.5/5 stars

Writing for Allmusic, critic Al Campbell wrote, "Super Hits samples ten tracks recorded by Blood, Sweat & Tears for Columbia Records in the late '60s and early '70s and includes the original versions of "Spinning Wheel," "You've Made Me So Very Happy" and "And When I Die." Ultimately, this collection isn't as detailed as Blood, Sweat & Tears Greatest Hits, but it's still a good bargain for the budget-conscious."

== Track listing ==
1. "Spinning Wheel" (David Clayton-Thomas) – 4:05
2. "You've Made Me So Very Happy" (Berry Gordy Jr., Brenda Holloway, Patrice Holloway, Frank Wilson) – 4:16
3. "More And More" (Vee Pee, Don Juan) – 3:01
4. "And When I Die" (Laura Nyro) – 4:03
5. "I Can't Quit Her" (Al Kooper, Irwin Levine) – 3:38
6. "Somethin' Goin' On" (Al Kooper) – 8:00
7. "Just One Smile" (Randy Newman) – 4:36
8. "I Love You More Than You'll Ever Know" (Al Kooper) – 5:56
9. "Roller Coaster" (Mark James) – 3:21
10. "John the Baptist (Holy John)" (Al Kooper, Phyllis Major) – 3:33

== Production ==
- Mastered by Rick Rowe at Media Force, NYC
- "Spinning Wheel", "You've Made Me So Very Happy", "More and More" and "And When I Die"

Produced by James William Guercio
From the Columbia album Blood, Sweat & Tears CS 9720

- "I Can't Quit Her", "Somethin' Goin' On", "Just One Smile" and "I Love You More Than You'll Ever Know"

Produced by John Simon
From the Columbia album Child Is Father To The Man CS 9619

- "Roller Coaster"

Produced by Steve Tyrell
From the Columbia album No Sweat KC 32180

- "John the Baptist (Holy John)"

Produced by Don Heckman, Bobby Colomby and Roy Halee
From the Columbia album Blood, Sweat & Tears 4 KC 30590
