= What the Hell Happened to Blood, Sweat & Tears? =

2023 film directed by John Scheinfeld

- Directed by: John Scheinfeld
- Written by: John Scheinfeld
- Produced by: Dave Harding, Peter S. Lynch
- Cinematography: Tristan Whitman
- Edited by: Peter S. Lynch II
- Music by: Concert: Blood, Sweat & Tears; Score: Bobby Colomby, David Mann
- Distributed by: Abramorama, Freestyle Releasing
- Release date: March 24, 2023
- Running time: 112 minutes
- Country: United States
- Language: English

What the Hell Happened to Blood, Sweat & Tears? is a 2023 documentary film about the American band Blood, Sweat & Tears in peak form, touring in mid-1970 through several Eastern Bloc countries during the Cold War, and how the band's reputation suffered after the trip. Directed by John Scheinfeld, the film uses archival footage, reenactments and modern interviews to tell the story of how a three-week goodwill tour sponsored by the US State Department turned sour with American fans who had been in agreement with the band's anti–Vietnam war stance but who now felt betrayed. Inflamed by a widely reported protest by left-wing activist Abbie Hoffman, a number of BS&T fans assumed that the band had become shills for President Richard Nixon's warmongering government. In the film, band members reveal the secret story of how they were blackmailed by the State Department into making the trip in order for their Canadian lead singer David Clayton-Thomas to be issued a permanent resident visa—a green card which was necessary for him to continue working with the band.

The filmmakers incorporated a wealth of visual materials including little-seen concert footage of BS&T at Woodstock and a contrasting pair of press conferences held before and after the tour. Many of the participants of the tour are seen talking about their experiences. Critically important to the 2023 film is footage from a failed 1970 effort to produce a documentary about the tour, with director Donn Cambern describing the frustrating experience of trying to create an exciting concert film under pressure from multiple government agencies to keep the film as conventional as possible.

Critical response to the film was mixed, with reviewers divided regarding the film's premise that the Eastern Bloc tour caused the band's popularity to decline. Some agreed strongly with the premise, while others wrote that the band's demise was caused by Clayton-Thomas leaving in 1972 or by runaway egos within the nine-piece band. The film's presentation of concert footage and other archival material was widely praised.

== Background ==
The nine-piece American jazz rock group Blood, Sweat & Tears (BS&T) was one of the most successful bands in the world at the start of 1970. They had headlined Woodstock in August 1969, giving them counterculture credibility, and they won the Grammy Award for Album of the Year in March 1970 for their second album Blood, Sweat & Tears, beating the Beatles album Abbey Road. They released three hit singles in 1969, all of them reaching number 2 on the US pop chart: "You've Made Me So Very Happy", "Spinning Wheel" and "And When I Die". But the band hit two snags in its forward progress, taking heavy criticism in the media for playing a sold-out show at Caesars Palace in 1969, because Las Vegas was seen by the band's anti-establishment fanbase as an establishment stronghold. As well, the band's soulful Canadian lead singer David Clayton-Thomas needed to renew his US green card, but the application was apparently being stonewalled by the US State Department. He did not know that the US government was investigating his criminal past, discovering that Clayton-Thomas had spent many of his teen years in Canadian reformatories and jails, and determining that this history gave them leverage over the band.

Our singer is Canadian, and he’s saying things like, 'There is bigotry in the United States. There's racism beyond belief. The war in Vietnam is disgusting.' He was always wearing a peace sign T-shirt. So what I think happened, we haven't been able to prove it, but some very right-wing congressman said, 'Who is this Canadian? Who does he think he is telling us what to do?' So they pull his green card, they find out he had a jail record in Canada... and they go, 'Great, we got him.' The State Department said, 'You want the green card? We want you to do a tour for us.'

—Bobby Colomby

To fix the green card problem, the band's manager Larry Goldblatt agreed to the State Department's proposal: the band would conduct an unpaid goodwill tour of several countries behind the so-called Iron Curtain, and Clayton-Thomas would get his green card. Otherwise, the singer would get deported. The band felt blackmailed. Guitarist Steve Katz, the most outspoken band member on political issues, was angry, telling the New York Post, "In no way do I support this tour, but I'm part of a band..." Katz said that the band could command $50,000 per concert but that the Eastern European tour dates would be performed without pay.

The US government, starting in the mid-1950s, had already sponsored other musical artists on tours of cultural diplomacy, mostly sending classical musicians but also jazz artists such as Louis Armstrong. The government program was officially named the Cultural Presentations Program, but they were popularly known as jazz ambassadors. BS&T would be the first "rock" band in the program, scheduled to perform in Zagreb, Ljubljana, Belgrade, Constanța, Bucharest, Ploiești, Warsaw and Poznań during three weeks in June–July 1970.

The purpose of the tour was to show the world how American music was associated with freedom. Richard Nixon's government was interested in building rapport between the US and Poland, Romania and Yugoslavia. US State Department representatives accompanied BS&T everywhere on the voyage, and they gave orders to the band regarding their appearance and conduct. Local officials at each foreign city also watched the band members carefully, bugging their hotel rooms and rifling through their belongings, with government agents following them if they took a stroll.

=== 1970 documentary project ===
To showcase the band on tour, the State Department paid for a documentary film crew to travel with the band, directed by Donn Cambern in his first major film project, and produced by Mal Klein who brought his 14-year-old son Dan. The State Department would retain final executive power over the resulting film. Under the aegis of National General Pictures, Cambern would supervise a crew of cameramen and audio engineers who ended up shooting 65 hours of raw footage, and capturing the sound on five reels of professional multitrack tape carrying eight channels. The State Department realized after the tour that too much of the material portrayed Romania negatively, so they canceled the film and took the camera reels. None of it was seen by the public at the time, and only an unrealistically cheerful 53-minute television "travelogue" version, never aired, remains from the project, discovered by MGM chief archivist Dee Dee Dreyer. Many portions of this TV edit appear in the 2023 documentary. The 1970 crew members also took 35mm slides or still photographs with their personal cameras, and some of these shots were made available to director John Scheinfeld and editor Peter S. Lynch II as they were assembling the 2023 documentary.

=== 1970 Eastern Bloc tour ===
The tour got off to a rocky start when lead singer David Clayton-Thomas was arrested in New York City shortly before the entourage was to fly out. He was charged with threatening a woman with a gun; the accusation was frivolous and the charges were dropped.

The tour lasted from June 13 to July 7, and BS&T played eleven shows:

- June 17 and 18: Šalata, Zagreb, Yugoslavia (now Croatia)
- June 19: Tivoli Hall in Ljubljana, Yugoslavia (now Slovenia)
- June 20: Tašmajdan Stadium in Belgrade, Yugoslavia (now Serbia)
- June 22: Sarajevo, Yugoslavia (now Bosnia and Herzegovina)
- June 23 and 25: Constanța, Romania
- June 26 and 27: Bucharest, Romania
- July 5 and 6: Congress Hall in Warsaw, Poland

A planned concert in Ploiești on June 28 and any further Romanian concerts were canceled by Romanian officials after they were unsettled by audience reactions in Bucharest. Poznań, Poland, was reported by Billboard as a scheduled destination but the concert did not appear in the film.

Scheinfeld's 2023 documentary portrays how the first concerts in Zagreb were received indifferently by the Yugoslavian audience, many of whom left before the final song. The dour response changed drastically by the next week: the band was enthusiastically welcomed in the Romanian beach town of Constanța, with the crowd flashing V signs for peace, shouting "U.S.A!" and calling for encore songs. The Romanian guards were disturbed by this development, and the band was given a list of changes the Romanian officials wanted them to make for the next performance, such as fewer long-haired crew members in view, and fewer dramatic gestures made on stage. BS&T was instructed to play more jazz and less rock. The band held a meeting to discuss the demands, and drummer Bobby Colomby ridiculed the list, joking about the impossibility of a "jazz meter" to indicate the ratio of jazz to rock. Rather than accede to the demands, the band ended up performing even more dynamically at the second Constanța show. In Bucharest, the crowd roared its approval, but Romanian security personnel reacted by setting police dogs on those in the front rows, and they severely beat a man who came backstage looking for an autograph. It was not until the beautiful Congress Hall in Warsaw that the band felt that they had been lifted out of stark oppression; the Polish audience seemed worldly and progressive, thoroughly appreciating the concert.

=== Post-tour criticism ===
People there don't enjoy the privilege of spontaneous outburst. It's given us all a new appreciation of various freedoms that we took for granted.

—David Clayton-Thomas upon returning from Eastern Europe

The band's third album, Blood, Sweat & Tears 3, was released in early June 1970 while the band was still on tour. They flew home and were surprised by a press conference hosted by production manager Lou Rudolph of National General Pictures, requiring spokesmen from the band to talk about the tour. Rolling Stone journalist David Felton gave a detailed account of the press conference, noting that Clayton-Thomas, Colomby and Katz stayed to field questions. The band members said that they had changed their minds about the US government after seeing such terrible oppression in countries under Soviet control. Felton wrote that all nine members of the band had converted to "Americanism" on the tour. This review hurt the band's anti-Nixon, anti-war reputation.

On July 25, 1970, the radical left activist Abbie Hoffman scored media points against BS&T by protesting with his Yippie colleagues outside of Madison Square Garden where BS&T was headlining a sold-out concert with Miles Davis opening. Hoffman and the Yippies held signs saying "Blood, Sweat & Bullshit", and they railed against the band's involvement with the US government, claiming falsely that the band was now working for the Central Intelligence Agency (CIA), and that they had become a "fascist rock band." One of the protesters gained access to the venue and threw horse manure toward the stage during the show, some of it hitting the drum kit. (The film reenacts this deed.) Hoffman's diatribe against the band was carried by electronic and print media, and set the tone for critical evaluations of the band's changing politics, along with Felton's Rolling Stone piece.

In 2022, Rolling Stone listed "the 50 worst decisions in music history" and placed BS&T at number 7 for agreeing to the government-sponsored tour "at the height of the Vietnam war."

== Production ==
The idea for the 2023 film came from a question asked of founding BS&T drummer Bobby Colomby by director John Scheinfeld in February 2020: what happened to BS&T? Colomby said the true story was a secret kept by the band about being blackmailed by the State Department. (The secret had already been revealed by lead singer David Clayton-Thomas in his 2010 memoir Blood, Sweat & Tears, but his explanation was considered dubious by observers.) Scheinfeld began collecting material to make a documentary about this little-known deal, poring through dusty boxes of photographs and slides, and visiting archives to locate lost footage. The 1970 TV edit was tracked down during the 2020 COVID-19 lockdowns by Dee Dee Dreyer, director of inventory and research at Metro-Goldwyn-Mayer, months after Scheinfeld visited the MGM archive and failed to uncover the tapes. Scheinfeld asserted that the 2023 documentary could not have been made without this providential find.

Scheinfeld gained access to relevant US government documents through the Freedom of Information Act; these were highlighted in the film and read by actors dubbing the voices of Richard Nixon, Henry Kissinger and others. Scheinfeld interviewed surviving band members Colomby, Clayton-Thomas, bassist Jim Fielder, saxophonist Fred Lipsius and guitarist Steve Katz. He also interviewed music critics David Felton and David Wild of Rolling Stone, and the original film director Donn Cambern who provided stirring descriptions of the concerts. The 1970 producer Mal Klein had died, but his son Daniel Klein was interviewed, describing what he saw as a teenager on the tour, and what he remembered about his father's involvement. Daniel said that the secretive manner of the Eastern European government agents felt "like a James Bond movie." Assistant producer Tina Cunningham was interviewed about her experiences on tour, and historians Danielle Fosler-Lussier and Timothy Naftali appear on screen providing context of the band within the cultural and political environment. Label executive Clive Davis, who signed BS&T to Columbia Records, shared his thoughts about the time period. In the film, Felton reads excerpts from his largely negative 1970 Rolling Stone review and reacts to it by apologizing, saying it was "kind of a snotty story." Cambern died in January 2023 two months before the film was released; it was dedicated to his memory. Cambern's final pronouncement in the film confirms its narrative, saying that the band "really got screwed."

Scheinfeld sent out a request for materials to historians in Poland, Romania and the former Yugoslavian states. This call resulted in secret Eastern European government documents brought to light, and a handful of 1970 concert-goers were found who agreed to be interviewed. One audience member from Romania said, "It was a sign for all of Romania that outside the borders there is life, and it is a very free one."

== Release ==
The film project's existence was announced in November 2020 with director John Scheinfeld describing his progress to Rolling Stone, and pointing fans to a website for the film. Singer Clayton-Thomas talked with Goldmine magazine about the film project in 2021. The film was released on March 24, 2023, playing in theaters in New York and Los Angeles, expanding across the US and Canada to other theaters in April. Distributed by Abramorama, the film was offered for online streaming by subscription holders at veeps.com on August 20, 2023. In late 2023, the film was bought by Freestyle Releasing for a multi-platform digital streaming release in HD format on February 27, 2024. A DVD was also released.

A soundtrack album was released by Omnivore Recordings on April 21, 2023, containing 10 songs captured live on the tour, remastered from recordings held at the Margaret Herrick Library. A companion soundtrack album was also released by Omnivore containing 11 tracks of film score work composed by founding drummer Bobby Colomby and his composer/arranger colleague David Mann. The orchestral score included sections written in BS&T's signature style, performed by the current lineup of BS&T.

== Critical reception ==
The media response to the film was mixed, even polarized. Some publications such as The New Yorker thought that the film was excellent entertainment for everyone while others such as Consequence said it would be interesting only for dedicated fans of BS&T. Several reviewers wrote that the film's premise was insufficient to explain the demise of BS&T, which continued to have pop chart success through 1972. Metacritic lists the average score as 60 based on six critical reviews.

Variety's Owen Gleiberman said the film was "essential" for its story of intrigue and betrayal, a "tasty and urgent piece of rock history". Gleiberman opined that the real downfall of BS&T came in 1972 when the charismatic Canadian lead singer went solo—"the band needed every bit of his sweat and swagger." Donald Liebenson from the Chicago Reader felt that the film provided "long overdue vindication for the band", noting that it "plays out like a cross between a James Bond thriller and a Peter Sellers comedy."

The New York Times published two contrasting reviews. Alan Light wholeheartedly agreed with the film's premise that the Eastern Bloc tour "destroyed" the band, turning them into "propaganda pawns", quoting the 2022 Rolling Stone assessment. Freelance critic Calum Marsh disagreed, criticizing the "cranky" film for showing the band as passive rather than active participants in the State Department's political theater, maintaining that they should be held directly accountable for their own "career-ending" misstep. Marsh said the film was "naïve" in "its attempts to remain apolitical and focus on the music".

Rolling Stone's Jon Blistein praised the film as "an archival marvel, offering a comprehensive look at the tour and its aftermath with newly discovered and remastered concert audio. Michael Rechtshaffen wrote for the Los Angeles Times that the documentary was "equal parts international intrigue, concert film and VH1-style Behind the Music cautionary tale" but that its "less convincing" premise was ultimately "unanswerable". Rechtshaffen theorized that the band's "inescapable clash of egos" would have brought them down in any case. He suggested that the band could have refused the State Department deal and carried on without Clayton-Thomas.

Jonah Krueger from Consequence described the film as unsurprising because of its portrayal of well-known geopolitical themes and popular concert music. Krueger said the film "wants to be more than it is" and fails to prove its point. Otherwise, it served as a "perfectly acceptable—even enjoyable—tour vlog of a particularly interesting set of shows." New Yorker magazine's Anthony Lane recommended the film, writing that the "knotty new documentary... is an engaging, and sometimes enraging, exposé of chronic insularity."
