= New Blood (Blood, Sweat & Tears album) =

Studio album by Blood, Sweat & Tears
- Released: October 1972
- Recorded: Columbia Studios, New York City
- Genre: Jazz rock, Pop rock, Blues rock
- Length: 40:16
- Label: Columbia
- Producer: Bobby Colomby

Blood, Sweat & Tears chronology
Greatest Hits (1972)	New Blood (1972)	No Sweat (1973)

New Blood is the fifth album by the band Blood, Sweat & Tears, released in October 1972.

With David Clayton-Thomas leaving as lead vocalist to pursue a solo career after the release of BS&T 4, a nearly wholesale personnel change occurred for New Blood. Difficulties had arisen inside the group between its pop-rock and jazz factions, with Clayton-Thomas choosing to leave in early January 1972, along with founding member Fred Lipsius. Clayton-Thomas was briefly replaced by Bobby Doyle, and a photo of the band appeared in Down Beat showing a new lineup also including noted jazz saxophonist Joe Henderson. By the time the album was recorded, Jerry Fisher had become the new singer replacing Doyle (who guested on piano on "Touch Me" and "Velvet"), whilst founding member Dick Halligan also departed, as well as Henderson.

The album reached the top-40 charts (the last BS&T LP to do so) and spawned a single, "So Long Dixie", which peaked at number 44. The album's cover, painted by Bob Schulenberg and Dean Torrence of Jan & Dean, portrays two male peacocks sitting on a garden wall - a common Indian peacock and a white peacock.

An additional song, "Time Remembered" was recorded for this album but was not included. It later appeared on the compilation, The Very Best of Blood, Sweat and Tears: What Goes Up!.

New Blood was re-released on CD in 2005 on the Wounded Bird label.

== Reception ==
Professional ratings
Review scores
Source	Rating
Allmusic	2/5 stars

Writing for Allmusic, critic Ross Boissoneau wrote of the album, "The band vocals on "Touch Me" and the arrangement of Herbie Hancock's "Maiden Voyage" are among the highlights, but then there's Bob Dylan's "Down in the Flood" and Steve Katz's "Velvet". Gerry Goffin and Carole King's "Snow Queen" almost makes up for it, with sensational solos from Dave Bargeron on trombone and Lou Marini on sax."

== Track listing ==
1. "Down in the Flood" (Bob Dylan) – 4:21
2. "Touch Me" (Victoria Pike, Teddy Randazzo) – 3:33
3. "Alone" (Lou Marini) – 5:29
4. "Velvet" (Jeff Kent) – 3:31
5. "I Can't Move No Mountains" (Michael Gately, Robert John) – 2:58
6. "Over the Hill" (Dave Bargeron) – 4:20
7. "So Long Dixie" (Barry Mann, Cynthia Weil) – 4:28
8. "Snow Queen" (Gerry Goffin, Carole King) – 5:24
9. "Maiden Voyage" (Herbie Hancock) – 6:14

== Personnel ==
- Jerry Fisher – vocals
- Dave Bargeron – trombone, tuba, bass trombone, baritone horn, background vocals
- Bobby Colomby – drums, percussion, background vocals
- Jim Fielder – bass, background vocals
- Steve Katz – electric guitar, acoustic guitar, harmonica, lead vocal on "Velvet"
- Lou Marini – woodwinds
- Lew Soloff – trumpet, flugelhorn, piccolo trumpet
- Chuck Winfield – trumpet, flugelhorn, French horn, background vocals
- Georg Wadenius – guitar, background vocals
- Larry Willis – keyboards
- Bobby Doyle – piano (on "Touch Me" and "Velvet")

== Charts ==
Album - Billboard (United States)

Year	Chart	Position
1972	Pop Albums	32
