= Live and Improvised =

Live album by Blood, Sweat & Tears
- Released: May 7, 1991
- Recorded: 1975
- Genre: Rock, Jazz
- Length: 88:58
- Label: Columbia/Legacy
- Producer: Bobby Colomby, Jimmy Ienner

Blood, Sweat & Tears chronology
| Nuclear Blues (1980) | Live and Improvised (1991) | Live (1994) |

Live and Improvised is a two compact disc live album by the band Blood, Sweat & Tears, that was originally released in 1976 as a live album entitled In Concert by Columbia Records in Europe and Japan. This album was later remixed and released in the United States as Live and Improvised in 1991 by Columbia/Legacy and again as "In Concert" in 2012 by Wounded Bird, with a different cover. The line-up for this album is the same as the New City album they were supporting on that tour with the exception of Steve Khan and Mike Stern on guitar.

The songs in this collection were recorded over five nights in the middle of 1975 at the Schaeffer Music Festival in New York City; City Hall Plaza in Boston; National Arts Centre in Ottawa, Ontario; and at the Monterey Jazz Festival in Monterey, California.

== Reception ==
Professional ratings
Review scores
| Source | Rating |
|---|---|
| Allmusic | 2.5/5 stars |

Writing for Allmusic, critic Bruce Eder wrote, "What's also lacking is some excitement -- in the group's evident desire to emphasize their jazz side while minimizing any rock elements in their playing, they've also banished any tension, or the interplay between rock and jazz elements upon which their original appeal was founded. Numbers like "Spinning Wheel," "Lucretia MacEvil," "And When I Die," and "I Love You More Than You'll Ever Know" are done in such loose-limbed fashion that, apart from showcasing some virtuoso playing and Clayton-Thomas' more oppressive mannerisms, they're rather weak reinterpretations... On the positive side, along with the presence of those arrangements, the playing is very good, if not always terribly involving, and in those moments when Clayton-Thomas keeps his instincts in check, the material does recapture and expand on the best components of the original group's sound."

== Track listing ==
Disc One

1. "Spinning Wheel" (David Clayton-Thomas) – 6:02
2. "I Love You More Than You'll Ever Know" (Al Kooper) – 8:54
3. "Lucretia Mac Evil" (David Clayton-Thomas) – 7:08
4. "And When I Die" (Laura Nyro) – 2:10
5. "One Room Country Shack" (John Lee Hooker) – 6:57
6. "And When I Die (Reprise)" (Laura Nyro) – 3:07
7. "(I Can Recall) Spain" (Chick Corea) – 9:01

Disc Two

1. "Hi-De-Ho" (Gerry Goffin, Carole King) – 6:33
2. "Unit Seven" (Sam Jones) – 11:07
3. "Life" (Allen Toussaint) – 5:15
4. "Mean Ole World" (Jerry LaCroix) – 9:39
5. "Ride Captain Ride" (Carlos Pinera, Franke Konte) – 6:59
6. "You've Made Me So Very Happy" (Berry Gordy Jr., Brenda Holloway, Frank Wilson, Patrice Holloway) – 6:06

== Personnel ==
- David Clayton-Thomas – lead vocals
- Bobby Colomby - drums, backing vocals
- Dave Bargeron - trombone, tuba, percussion, backing vocals
- Larry Willis – keyboards, backing vocals
- Bill Tillman – saxophone, flute, backing vocals
- Anthony Klatka - trumpet, backing vocals
- Joe Giorgianni – trumpet, backing vocals
- Steve Khan - guitar, backing vocals at Schaeffer Music Festival; City Hall Plaza
- Georg Wadenius – guitar, backing vocals at the National Arts Centre
- Mike Stern - guitar, backing vocals at Monterey Jazz Festival
- Ron McClure – bass
- Don Alias - percussion, Backing vocals

== Production notes ==
- Jimmy Ienner – Executive Producer
- Bobby Colomby – Producer
- Recorded at the following locations:

July 5, 1975 – Schaeffer Music Festival in New York City
July 20, 1975 – City Hall Plaza in Boston
August 11, 12, 1975 – National Arts Centre in Ottawa, Ontario
September 21, 1975 – Monterey Jazz Festival in Monterey, California

Digitally remastered by Mark Wilder at Sony Music Studios, New York
