= The David Clayton-Thomas Show =

- Genre: Music
- Created by: George Mendeluk; David Slabotsky
- Written by: George Mendeluk; David Slabotsky
- Directed by: Athan Katsos
- Presented by: David Clayton-Thomas
- Country of origin: Canada
- Original language: English
- No. of seasons: 1
- No. of episodes: 3

Production
- Producer: Athan Katsos
- Running time: 30 minutes

Original release
- Network: CBC Television
- Release: 25 June – 9 July 1973

The David Clayton-Thomas Show is a Canadian television music and variety series that aired on CBC Television in 1973.

== Premise ==
The series was produced shortly after David Clayton-Thomas's departure from Blood, Sweat & Tears. Each episode featured three parts, a studio performance, a jam session and a production number.

The title sequence of the episodes featured Clayton-Thomas chauffeured in a Rolls-Royce as he travelled to the studio. Other musicians featured on the series were members of bands such as Dr. Music, Lighthouse and Motherlode. Trevor Lawrence was the series conductor and musical arranger.

== Scheduling ==
Three episodes of the half-hour series were broadcast on Mondays at 7:30 p.m. from 25 June to 9 July 1973.
