= Jerry Weiss =

Jerry Weiss may refer to:

- Jerry Weiss (musician)
- Jerry Weiss (artist)
