= Mirror Image (Blood, Sweat & Tears album) =

Studio album by Blood, Sweat & Tears
- Released: July 1974
- Genres: Rock, Jazz rock, soul, R&B
- Length: 37:24
- Label: Columbia
- Producer: Henry Cosby

Blood, Sweat & Tears chronology
| No Sweat (1973) | Mirror Image (1974) | New City (1975) |

Mirror Image is the seventh album by the band Blood, Sweat & Tears, released by Columbia Records in July 1974.

Founding member Jim Fielder left the band prior to the recording of Mirror Image, leaving drummer Bobby Colomby as the only remaining original member. Longtime horn player Lew Soloff also left the group. Jerry LaCroix, previously of Edgar Winter's band White Trash, joined on saxophone and occasional lead vocals. This album was produced by veteran Motown producer Henry Cosby, best known for his work on early Stevie Wonder songs.

== Reception ==
Professional ratings
Review scores
| Source | Rating |
|---|---|
| Allmusic | 1/5 stars |

Writing for Allmusic, critic Ross Boissoneau called the album "the most atypical Blood, Sweat & Tears album ever."

== Release history ==
In addition to the conventional two-channel stereo version the album was also released by Columbia in a four-channel quadraphonic edition on LP record and 8-track tape in 1974. The quad LP release was encoded in the SQ matrix system.

Mirror Image was first released on CD in 2005 on the Wounded Bird label. It was also reissued in the UK on the Super Audio CD format in 2019 by Dutton Vocalion. This release is a two albums on one disc compilation which also contains the 1975 Blood Sweat & Tears album New City. The Dutton Vocalion disc contains the complete stereo and quad versions of both albums.

== Track listing ==
1. "Tell Me That I'm Wrong" (Patricia Cosby) – 2:28
2. "Look Up to the Sky" (Anthony Klatka, Jerry LaCroix, Julian LaCroix) – 4:39
3. "Love Looks Good on You (You're Candy Sweet)" (Sharon Brown, Patricia Cosby) – 3:20
4. "Hold on to Me" (Dave Bargeron) – 4:10
5. "Thinking of You" (Klatka, LaCroix) – 4:26
6. "Are You Satisfied" (Bargeron, Jerry Fisher, Lacroix, Georg Wadenius) – 3:59
7. "Mirror Image" – 11:15
  - "Movement I - Maglomania" (Larry Willis) – 2:34
  - "Movement II - Mirror Image" (Ron McClure) – 3:31
  - "Movement III - South Mountain Shuffle" (Klatka) – 2:46
  - "Movement IV - Rock Reprise" (Bargeron, Fisher, LaCroix, Wadenius) – 2:17
8. "She's Coming Home" (Fisher, Wadenius) – 3:11

== Personnel ==
- Jerry Fisher – vocals on tracks 1, 2, 4, 6, 7
- Jerry LaCroix – saxophone, vocals on tracks 2, 3, 5, 6, 7
- Bill Tillman – saxophone
- Tony Klatka – trumpet
- Dave Bargeron – trombone, tuba
- Georg Wadenius – guitar, vocals on track 8
- Larry Willis – keyboards
- Ron McClure – bass
- Bobby Colomby – drums, percussion

Additional musicians:

- Robert Mason – synthesizer
- Ralph MacDonald – percussion
- Dom Um Romão – percussion
- Warren Smith – percussion

== Charts ==
Album - Billboard (United States)

| Year | Chart | Position |
|---|---|---|
| 1974 | Pop Albums | 149 |
