= No Sweat (Blood, Sweat & Tears album) =

Studio album by Blood, Sweat & Tears
- Released: August 1973
- Studio: Electric Lady, New York City; Trident, London
- Genre: Blue-eyed soul, Jazz, Jazz rock, Jazz funk
- Label: Columbia
- Producer: Steve Tyrell

Blood, Sweat & Tears chronology
New Blood (1972)	No Sweat (1973)	Mirror Image (1974)

Professional ratings
Review scores
Source	Rating
AllMusic	1/5 stars
The Encyclopedia of Popular Music	2/5 stars
The Rolling Stone Album Guide	1/5 stars

No Sweat is the sixth album by the band Blood, Sweat & Tears, released in 1973.

By mid-1973, Steve Katz, one of the founding members of BS&T, had left the band as the members leaned further towards jazz fusion. No Sweat continued in the jazz-fusion vein and featured intricate horn work.

No Sweat was re-released on CD in 2005 on the Wounded Bird label.

== Production ==
No Sweat was produced by Steve Tyrell. Paul Buckmaster was brought in to provide string arrangements.

== Reception ==
AllMusic critic Ross Boissoneau wrote that the album "may be the jazziest BS&T ever." The critic for the Daily Herald wrote that "[Jerry] Fisher's gravelly voice seems the perfect replacement and, while I at first thought he tried too much to sound like Clayton-Thomas, he now appears to have evolved a strong singing style of his own."

== Track listing ==
1. "Roller Coaster" (Mark James) – 3:23
2. "Save Our Ship" (Georg Wadenius, Cynthia Weil) – 3:43
3. "Django (An Excerpt)" (John Lewis) – 2:08
4. "Rosemary" (Randy Newman) – 3:13
5. "Song for John" (Lou Marini) – 2:53
6. "Almost Sorry" (Jeff Kent, Doug Lubahn) – 6:26
7. "Back Up Against the Wall" (Buddy Buie, James B. Cobb Jr.) – 3:21
8. "Hip Pickles" (Marini) – 1:31
9. "My Old Lady" (Wadenius, Weil) – 3:15
10. "Empty Pages" (Jim Capaldi, Steve Winwood) – 3:15
11. "Mary Miles" (Michael Rabon) – 2:26
12. "Inner Crisis" (Larry Willis) – 5:40

== Personnel ==
- Jerry Fisher – vocals
- Dave Bargeron – trombone, tuba, bass trombone, baritone horn, background vocals
- Bobby Colomby – drums, percussion, background vocals
- Jim Fielder – bass, background vocals
- Lou Marini – woodwinds
- Lew Soloff – trumpet
- Tom Malone – trumpet, ARP, 12-String fiddle
- Georg Wadenius – guitar, background vocals
- Larry Willis – keyboards

=== Additional musicians ===
- Paul Buckmaster – synthesizer, ARP, horn arrangements, string arrangements, string conductor
- David Hentschel – synthesizer, ARP
- Steve Katz – guitar
- Chuck Winfield – trumpet, flugelhorn, French horn
- Jimmy Maelen – percussion
- Frank Ricotti – percussion
- Joshie Armstead – background vocals
- Valerie Simpson – background vocals
- Maretha Stewart – background vocals

== Charts ==
Chart (1973)	Peak position
Billboard Top LPs	72
