= More Than Ever (Blood, Sweat & Tears album) =

Studio album by Blood, Sweat & Tears
- Released: July 1976
- Genre: Blue-eyed soul, Jazz funk
- Length: 38:51
- Label: Columbia
- Producer: Bob James

Blood, Sweat & Tears chronology
| In Concert (1976) | More Than Ever (1976) | Brand New Day (1977) |

More Than Ever is the ninth album by the band Blood, Sweat & Tears, released in July 1976. This was the band's ninth studio album and their last for Columbia Records. The album peaked at number 165 on the Billboard albums chart. It contained one charting single, "You're the One" (US No. 106, AC No. 6).

The personnel changes in the band continued with Mike Stern replacing Georg Wadenius on electric guitar, Danny Trifan replacing Ron McClure on bass, and Forest Buchtell replacing Joe Giorgianni on trumpet. Percussionist Don Alias left the band, and Mike Corbett was added on background vocals. Famed bassist Jaco Pastorius, who had been discovered and signed to Epic Records by Bobby Colomby, was briefly in the band around this time but did not appear on the album.

More Than Ever was produced by Bob James who brought in such legendary session players as Steve Khan on guitar, Richard Tee on keyboards, Eric Gale on guitar, Hugh McCracken on guitar, and Eric Weissberg on banjo and dobro along with vocalist Patti Austin on background vocals to complement the regular BS&T lineup.

The album had an unusual cover design, simply presenting a photo of the vinyl record itself. The UK issue had a different sleeve: although the design was the same, the image differed as the centre label replicated the CBS Records one used in the UK which differed from the Colombia one used in the US.

More Than Ever was re-released on CD in 2003 on the Wounded Bird label along with Sony Music.

== Reception ==
Professional ratings
Review scores
| Source | Rating |
|---|---|
| Allmusic | 3/5 stars |

The Allmusic review by Bruce Eder says: "For the first time since its second album, the group -- with only drummer Bobby Colomby left from the original lineup and Bob James producing -- sounds bold, enthused, and fully positive in its approach. The sound is a little more R&B oriented and less rocking than the older lineup, which actually makes a better fit overall -- Thomas' singing style is a bit dated, from a tradition of '60s blue-eyed soul that seems fine, but which was really out-of-place amid the disco boom of the second half of the '70s."

== Track listing ==
1. "They" (David Clayton-Thomas, William Daniel Smith) - 6:26
2. "I Love You More Than Ever" (Allan Langdon, Douglas Lenier) - 5:27
3. "Katy Bell" (Stephen C. Foster, Bob James) - 4:27
4. "Sweet Sadie the Savior" (Patti Austin) - 4:22
5. "Hollywood" (David Clayton-Thomas, William Daniel Smith) - 3:34
6. "You're the One" (David Clayton-Thomas, William Daniel Smith) - 4:54
7. "Heavy Blue" (Larry Willis) - 5:23
8. "Saved By the Grace Of Your Love" (William Daniel Smith, David Palmer) - 4:18

== Personnel ==
- David Clayton-Thomas – vocals
- Mike Stern – guitar
- Don Alias – percussion
- Larry Willis – keyboards
- Danny Trifan – bass
- Bobby Colomby – drums
- Tony Klatka – trumpet
- Forest Buchtell – trumpet
- Dave Bargeron – trombone, tuba
- Bill Tillman – tenor saxophone, flute

=== Guest musicians ===
- Bob James – keyboards
- Richard Tee – keyboards
- Steve Khan – guitar
- Eric Gale – guitar
- Hugh McCracken – guitar
- Gary King – bass
- Eric Weissberg – banjo, dobro
- Arnie Lawrence – alto saxophone
- Jon Faddis – trumpet
- Marvin Stamm – trumpet
- Dave Taylor – trombone
- Sid Weinberg – oboe
- Dave Freidman – xylophone, marimba, vibes

=== Singers ===
- Patti Austin, Vivian Cherry, Lani Groves, Gwendolyn Guthrie, Yolanda McCullough, Frank Lloyd, William Eaton, Zachery Sanders

Production notes

- Bob James – producer and arranger
- Bobby Colomby – associate producer
