= Blood, Sweat & Tears 3 =

Album by Blood, Sweat & Tears

Studio album by Blood, Sweat & Tears
- Released: June 1970
- Genre: Rock
- Length: 42:46
- Label: Columbia
- Producers: Bobby Colomby, Roy Halee

Blood, Sweat & Tears chronology
Blood, Sweat & Tears (1968)	Blood, Sweat & Tears 3 (1970)	B, S & T; 4 (1971)

Blood, Sweat & Tears 3 is the third album by the band Blood, Sweat & Tears. It was released in June 1970.

== History ==
After the huge success of the previous album, Blood, Sweat & Tears 3 was highly anticipated and it rose quickly to the top of the US album chart. It contained two hit singles: an arrangement of Carole King's "Hi-De-Ho", and "Lucretia MacEvil", written by singer David Clayton-Thomas. As with their previous album, this one relied mostly on songs borrowed from outside writers. However, It received fewer favorable reviews.

== Reception ==
Professional ratings
Review scores
Source	Rating
AllMusic	3/5 stars
Christgau's Record Guide	C−
The Village Voice	C

Village Voice critic Robert Christgau panned David Clayton-Thomas's singing as "belching", while calling "Symphony for the Devil" a "pretty good rock and roll song revealed as a pseudohistorical middlebrow muddle when suite-ened." AllMusic's William Ruhlman called the album "a convincing, if not quite as impressive, companion to their previous hit. David Clayton-Thomas remained an enthusiastic blues shouter, and the band still managed to put together lively arrangements... although their pretentiousness, on the extended "Symphony/Sympathy for the Devil," and their tendency to borrow other artists' better-known material rather than generating more of their own, were warning signs for the future."

== Track listing ==
=== Side One ===
1. "Hi-De-Ho" (Gerry Goffin, Carole King) – 4:27
2. "The Battle" (Dick Halligan, Steve Katz) – 2:41
3. "Lucretia MacEvil" (David Clayton-Thomas) – 3:04
4. "Lucretia's Reprise" (Blood, Sweat & Tears) – 2:35
5. "Fire and Rain" (James Taylor) – 4:03
6. "Lonesome Suzie" (Richard Manuel) – 4:36

=== Side Two ===
1. "Symphony for the Devil" (Dick Halligan) / "Sympathy for the Devil" (Mick Jagger, Keith Richards) – 7:49
2. "He's a Runner" (Laura Nyro) – 4:14
3. "Somethin' Comin' On" (Joe Cocker, Chris Stainton) – 4:33
4. "40,000 Headmen" (Steve Winwood, Jim Capaldi) – 4:44

== Personnel ==
- David Clayton-Thomas - lead vocals (all but 2)
- Steve Katz - guitar, lead vocals (2), harmonica
- Jim Fielder - bass guitar
- Dick Halligan - organ, piano, electric piano, harpsichord, backing vocals, recorder, celeste, trombone, flute, alto flute
- Fred Lipsius - alto saxophone, piano, electric piano, music box, backing vocals
- Lew Soloff - trumpet, flugelhorn, piccolo trumpet
- Chuck Winfield - trumpet, flugelhorn
- Jerry Hyman - trombone, bass trombone, baritone horn
- Bobby Colomby - drums, backing vocals, percussion

== Production ==
- Producers: Bobby Colomby, Roy Halee
- Engineers: Roy Halee, Lou Waxman
- Arrangers: David Clayton-Thomas, Bobby Colomby, Jim Fielder, Dick Halligan, Fred Lipsius
- Design: John Berg
- Photography: Lee Friedlander, Melissa Katz, Fred Lombardi

== Charts ==
Album

Year	Chart	Position
1970	RPM (Canada) Top Albums	1
1970	Billboard (United States) Pop Albums	1

Singles

Year	Single	Chart	Position
RPM (Canada) 1970	"Hi-De-Ho"	Top Singles	5
Billboard (United States) 1970	"Hi-De-Ho"	Pop Singles	14
RPM (Canada) 1970	"Lucretia MacEvil"	Top Singles	10
Billboard (United States) 1970	"Lucretia MacEvil"	Pop Singles	29
