= B, S & T; 4 =

Studio album by Blood, Sweat & Tears
- Released: June 1971
- Recorded: January – April 1971
- Studio: CBS Studios, San Francisco
- Genre: Jazz rock, Progressive rock, Gospel
- Length: 40:26
- Label: Columbia
- Producer: Don Heckman, Bobby Colomby, Roy Halee

Blood, Sweat & Tears chronology
Blood, Sweat & Tears 3 (1970)	B, S & T; 4 (1971)	Greatest Hits (1972)

B, S & T; 4 (also expanded as Blood, Sweat & Tears; 4) is the fourth album by the band Blood, Sweat & Tears, released in June 1971. It peaked at number 10 on the Billboard Pop albums chart.

The band invited former member Al Kooper to contribute the song "John the Baptist (Holy John)". Trombonist Dave Bargeron replaced Jerry Hyman.

David Clayton-Thomas left as lead vocalist to pursue a solo career after the release of B, S & T; 4, as did founding members Dick Halligan and Fred Lipsius. Clayton-Thomas would return to the lineup for 1975's New City.

== Reception ==
Professional ratings
Review scores
Source	Rating
AllMusic	2/5 stars
Christgau's Record Guide	C−

AllMusic critic William Ruhlman wrote that "the band's cohesion seemed to be disintegrating... Although the album scraped the Top Ten briefly and went gold, it marked the end of BS&T's period of wide commercial success on records."

== Track listing ==
1. "Go Down Gamblin'" (David Clayton-Thomas) – 4:14
2. "Cowboys and Indians" (Dick Halligan, Terry Kirkman) – 3:07
3. "John the Baptist (Holy John)" (Al Kooper, Phyllis Major) – 3:35
4. "Redemption" (Halligan, Clayton-Thomas) – 5:11
5. "Lisa, Listen to Me" (Halligan, Clayton-Thomas) – 2:58
6. "A Look to My Heart" (Fred Lipsius) – 0:52
7. "High on a Mountain" (Steve Katz) – 3:13
8. "Valentine's Day" (Katz) – 3:56
9. "Take Me in Your Arms (Rock Me a Little While)" (Holland-Dozier-Holland) – 3:27
10. "For My Lady" (Katz) – 3:23
11. "Mama Gets High" (Dave Bargeron, Katz) – 4:09
12. "A Look to My Heart" (Lipsius) – 2:07

== Personnel ==
- David Clayton-Thomas - lead vocals except as noted; guitar on "Go Down Gamblin'"
- Steve Katz - electric guitar, acoustic guitar, harmonica, mandolin; lead vocals on "Valentine's Day"
- Jim Fielder - bass; guitar on "Redemption"
- Dick Halligan - organ, piano, flute, trombone
- Fred Lipsius - alto saxophone, piano, organ, clarinet
- Dave Bargeron - trombone, tuba, bass trombone, baritone horn, acoustic bass
- Lew Soloff - trumpet, flugelhorn, piccolo trumpet
- Chuck Winfield - trumpet, flugelhorn
- Bobby Colomby - drums, percussion

Additional musicians

- Don Heckman - clarinet, bass clarinet ("Valentine's Day" and "For My Lady")
- Michael Smith - congas ("Redemption")

== Production ==
- Producers: Don Heckman, Bobby Colomby, Roy Halee
- Engineers: Roy Halee, Lou Waxman
- Arrangers: Dave Bargeron, David Clayton-Thomas, Jim Fielder, Dick Halligan, Al Kooper, Fred Lipsius
- Design and Photography: Norman Seeff

== Charts ==
Album - Billboard (United States)

Year	Chart	Position
1971	Pop Albums	10

Singles - Billboard (United States)

Year	Single	Chart	Position
1971	"Go Down Gamblin'" (2:45 edit)	Pop Singles	32
1971	"Lisa, Listen To Me"	Pop Singles	73
