= David Clayton-Thomas =

British-Canadian musician (1941–2026)

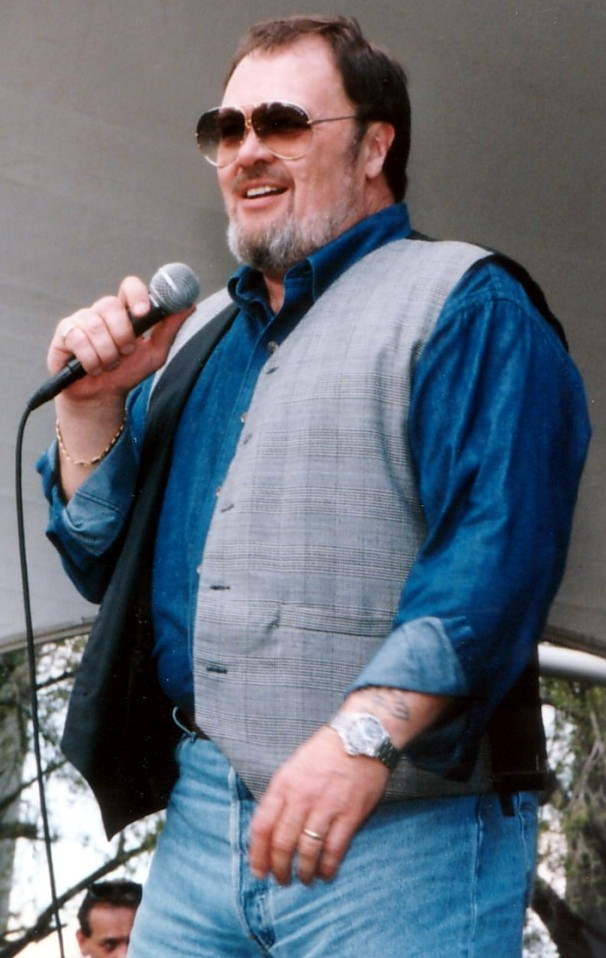

Background information
- Born: David Henry Thomsett; 13 September 1941; Kingston upon Thames, Surrey, England
- Died: 24 June 2026 (aged 84) Toronto, Ontario, Canada
- Genres: R&B; rock; funk; pop; jazz
- Occupations: Singer; songwriter; musician; record producer
- Instruments: Vocals; guitar; percussion
- Years active: 1962–2026
- Formerly of: Blood, Sweat & Tears
- Website: davidclaytonthomas.com

David Clayton-Thomas (born David Henry Thomsett, 13 September 1941 – 24 June 2026) was a British-Canadian musician, singer and songwriter, best known as the lead vocalist of the American band Blood, Sweat & Tears (commonly abbreviated as "BS&T"). He joined in 1968 and stayed through 1972, but later returned and departed the group again several times. With BS&T he won five Grammy Awards in 1970, including Album of the Year and Best Performance by a Male Vocalist.

Clayton-Thomas began his music career in the early 1960s, working the clubs on Toronto's Yonge Street, where he discovered his love of singing and playing the blues. Before moving to New York City in 1967, Clayton-Thomas fronted a couple of local bands, first The Shays and then The Bossmen, one of the earliest rock bands with jazz influences.

He was inducted into the Canadian Music Hall of Fame and in 2007 his composition "Spinning Wheel" was enshrined in the Canadian Songwriter's Hall of Fame. In 2010, Clayton-Thomas received his star on Canada's Walk of Fame.

== Early life ==
Clayton-Thomas was born in Kingston upon Thames, Surrey, England, the son of Fred Thomsett, a decorated Canadian soldier of World War II. His mother, Freda May (née Smith), played the piano and met Thomsett when she came to entertain the troops at a London hospital. After the war, the family settled in Willowdale, Toronto.

Clayton-Thomas inherited a love for music from his mother. His father was an abusive alcoholic who beat him. By the time he was fourteen, he had left home and was sleeping in parked cars and abandoned buildings and stealing food and clothing to survive. He was arrested several times for vagrancy, petty theft, and street brawls and spent much of his teens in various jails and reformatories, including the Burwash Industrial Farm.

== Early career ==
When an old guitar came into his possession, left behind by an outgoing reformatory inmate, David began to teach himself to play. Upon his release from detention in 1962, he gravitated to the Yonge Street "strip" in Toronto. Rhythm & blues from Detroit and Chicago was the main attraction on the strip. Arkansas rockabilly musician Ronnie Hawkins was a regular Toronto performer and recognized the talent of the young singer, then using the name Sonny Thomas. Soon he was fronting his own bands. The first was David Clayton Thomas and The Fabulous Shays. By this time, he had changed his surname to put some distance between his new life and his troubled teenage years.

In 1964 Clayton-Thomas and The Shays recorded John Lee Hooker's "Boom Boom". This led to a New York appearance on NBC-TV's Hullabaloo at the invitation of host, fellow Canadian Paul Anka. Abandoning the bars on the strip, Clayton-Thomas began performing in Yorkville Village's coffeehouses. He immersed himself in the scene dominated by Hooker, Joe Williams, Sonny Terry, Brownie McGhee, Lenny Breau, Oscar Peterson, and Moe Koffman.

The album David Clayton Thomas and the Shays à Go-Go was recorded for Roman Records and released in Canada in 1965, and was followed by David Clayton Thomas Sings Like It Is! in 1966. Clayton-Thomas made his mark more forcibly with his next band, The Bossmen, which included jazz musicians. In 1966 he wrote and sang the R&B-driven anti-war song "Brainwashed", which became a major Canadian hit, peaking at No. 11 on the RPM chart.

One night in 1966, after "sitting in" with Hooker in Yorkville, Clayton-Thomas left with him for New York. They played a Greenwich Village club for a couple of weeks; Hooker then left for Europe and Clayton-Thomas stayed on in New York City. He survived by playing "basket houses", where performers were given a few minutes to perform and then passed the basket for money.

While back in Toronto in early 1968 he led The David Clayton-Thomas Combine and released the single "Father Dear Father" on Yorkville Records just prior to moving back to New York City to join Blood, Sweat & Tears.

== Blood, Sweat & Tears ==
In 1968 folk singer Judy Collins heard Clayton-Thomas at a club in uptown Manhattan and told her friend, drummer Bobby Colomby. Bobby was looking for a new singer, as his band, BS&T, had three members leave the group just four months after releasing the debut Columbia Records album, Child Is Father to the Man. Colomby was impressed and invited Clayton-Thomas to join. Clayton-Thomas was one of four members added, bringing the membership up to nine. The reformed group debuted the Cafe Au Go-Go in Greenwich Village.

Clayton-Thomas's first album with the band, Blood, Sweat & Tears, was released in December 1968 and sold ten million copies. It topped the Billboard Magazine Top Albums chart for seven weeks and charted for 109 weeks. It won five Grammy Awards. Three hit singles were included, "You've Made Me So Very Happy", "Spinning Wheel", and "And When I Die". Each of these peaked at number 2 on the Billboard Hot 100. Also notable was a new arrangement of Billie Holiday's "God Bless The Child".

Seeking to capitalize on the singer, Decca Records purchased tapes of the Roman Records material in 1969. Decca's producer added horns to make it sound more like Blood, Sweat & Tears, and released the album David Clayton-Thomas!)

BS&T headlined major venues including; Royal Albert Hall, the Metropolitan Opera House, the Hollywood Bowl, Madison Square Garden, and Caesars Palace, as well as the Newport Jazz Festival and Woodstock. From June to July 1970, the band went on a United States Department of State–sponsored tour of Eastern Europe. Association with the United States government was highly unpopular with American rock fans who opposed the United States war in Vietnam and the band was criticized for allowing itself to be co-opted by United States President Richard Nixon's government.

Details were later revealed that the U.S. State Department had pressured the group into the tour in exchange for a residency permit for Clayton-Thomas, who had a criminal record in Canada, and had been deported from the United States after overstaying his travel visa. The tour and its aftermath is the focus of a 2023 feature-length documentary titled What the Hell Happened to Blood, Sweat & Tears?

The album Blood, Sweat & Tears 3 was released in June 1970 and featured Carole King's "Hi-De-Ho" and Clayton-Thomas' "Lucretia MacEvil". B, S & T; 4 in June 1971 yielded another Clayton-Thomas-penned hit single, "Go Down Gamblin'", where he also played electric guitar. Clayton-Thomas also co-wrote the song "Lisa Listen to Me" with Dick Halligan for this album. Blood Sweat & Tears' Greatest Hits was released in February 1972 and has since reached sales of seven million copies. In BS&T Clayton-Thomas sometimes played additional drums and percussion with Colomby during instrumental parts, as in the performance at Stockholm in September 1971.

The group traveled all over Europe, Australia, Asia, South America, the United States, and Canada. Constant touring began to take its toll. Clayton-Thomas left BS&T in 1972, exhausted. Variety later described Clayton-Thomas's decision as ruining the band who "needed every bit of his sweat and swagger." By the mid-1970s, the founding members of the band began to drift away to pursue other goals.

== Subsequent career ==
In 1972 Clayton-Thomas released his first Columbia solo album, simply titled David Clayton Thomas. In 1973 his next album Tequila Sunrise was released. He briefly hosted his own musical and variety TV show The David Clayton-Thomas Show for CBC Television. The show lasted for three episodes, broadcast in June and July 1973. In 1974 he issued Harmony Junction on RCA Records.

In 1975 Thomas returned to front BS&T on the albums New City and, in 1976, More Than Ever. In 1977 they released Brand New Day on the ABC label. In 1978 Thomas issued another solo album on ABC, titled Clayton. In 1980 BS&T issued the MCA Records album Nuclear Blues, which also included the singer. Later in the decade Columbia issued the double live Blood, Sweat & Tears album Live and Improvised again with Clayton-Thomas. His 1999 solo album Bloodlines included former band members from BS&T.

It was reported in the 30 May 1992 issue of Cash Box that Clayton-Thomas was one of the artists on the Sedona Recording Company roster. In 2004 Clayton-Thomas left New York for Toronto and launched an All-Star 10-piece band. He then began touring and recording almost a dozen new albums under his own name.

== Death ==
Clayton-Thomas died at St. Michael's Hospital in Toronto, on 24 June 2026, at the age of 84.

== Discography ==
=== Albums ===
Year	Album title	US Peak Position	Record label
1965	David Clayton Thomas and the Shays à Go-Go	—	Roman
1966	David Clayton Thomas (With The Bossmen) Sings Like It Is!	—	Roman
1969	David Clayton-Thomas!	159	Decca
1972	David Clayton-Thomas	184	Columbia
1972	Tequila Sunrise	—	Columbia
1973	David Clayton-Thomas (Harmony Junction)	—	RCA
1978	Clayton	—	ABC Music
1996	Blue Plate Special	—	DCT
1999	Bloodlines	—	DCT
2001	The Christmas Album	—	Fontana North / Maplecore
2005	Aurora	—	Justin Time
2006	In Concert: A Musical Biography	—	Justin Time
2008	The Evergreens	—	Fontana North / Maplecore
2009	Spectrum	—	
2010	Soul Ballads	—	Fuel
2013	A Blues for the New World	—	Antoinette
2015	Combo	—	Audio & Video Labs, Inc.
2016	Canadiana	—	Antoinette / Ils / Universal
2018	Mobius	—	Ils
2019	Say Somethin'	—	Antoinette

=== Singles ===
- 'Boom Boom' No. 16 July 27, 1964 CHUM
- 'Walk That Walk' No. 3 April 1965 CAN/No. 28 CHUM
- 'Take Me Back' No. 39 June 28, 1965 CHUM
- 'Out of the Sunshine' No. 31 CAN/No. 32 September 13, 1965 CHUM
- 'Brainwashed' No. 11 July 1966 CAN/No. 6 CHUM
- 'Sing A Song' No. 53 May 1972 CAN
- 'Magnificent Sanctuary Band' No. 56 June 1972 CAN
- 'Anytime...Babe' No. 91 July 1974 CAN

== See also ==
- The David Clayton-Thomas Show
- Rock music of Canada
- Music of Canada

== Sources ==
- Clayton-Thomas, David (June 2010). Blood, Sweat and Tears. Penguin Canada. ISBN 978-0-14-317599-5
- Davis, Clive (December 1975). Clive: Inside the Record Business. Ballantine Books. ISBN 978-0345247605
- LeBlanc, Larry: David Clayton-Thomas (artist biography)
- Bloomfield, Michael (September 2000). If You Love These Blues: An Oral History (1st ed.). Backbeat Books. ISBN 978-0-87930-617-5. (with CD of unissued music)
- Brooks, Ken (February 1999). The Adventures of Mike Bloomfield and Al Kooper with Paul Butterfield and David Clayton Thomas. Agenda Ltd. ISBN 978-1-899882-90-8.
- Kooper, Al (February 1977). Backstage Passes: Rock 'N' Roll Life in the Sixties (1st ed.). Stein & Day Pub. ISBN 978-0-8128-2171-0.
- Kooper, Al (September 1998). Backstage Passes and Backstabbing Bastards: Memoirs of a Rock 'N' Roll Survivor (updated ed.). Billboard Books. ISBN 978-0-8230-8257-5.
- Kooper, Al (February 2008). Backstage Passes and Backstabbing Bastards (new ed.). Hal Leonard Corporation. ISBN 978-0-87930-922-0.
