= Brand New Day (Blood, Sweat & Tears album) =

Studio album by Blood, Sweat & Tears
- Released: November 1977
- Studio: United Western, Hollywood, California; Criteria, Miami, Florida
- Genre: Rock, Jazz rock
- Length: 39:42
- Label: ABC
- Producer: Roy Halee, Bobby Colomby

Blood, Sweat & Tears chronology
More Than Ever (1976)	Brand New Day (1977)	Nuclear Blues (1980)

Brand New Day is the tenth album by the band Blood, Sweat & Tears, released in November 1977. This was the band's only release on ABC Records. It was produced by Roy Halee and the band's former drummer Bobby Colomby. Colomby and Halee had also co-produced the group's fourth album, Blood, Sweat & Tears; 4, in 1971. Brand New Day failed to reach the Billboard 200 chart, peaking at #205.

The group's lineup was the same as for the previous album, 1976's More Than Ever, except for the departure of Colomby, who had been the sole remaining original member of the group. Roy McCurdy took his place as drummer.

This album was first released on CD as an unofficial version made in Russia in the early 2000s. The CD contains three additional live tracks ("I'll Drown In My Own Tears", "Gimme That Wine", and "Trouble In Mind / Shake A Hand") not on the original LP. Then in 2024 an official CD release was done without any additional tracks.

== Reception ==
Professional ratings
Review scores
Source	Rating
Allmusic	2/5 stars

Jason Elias wrote for AllMusic, "For the most part, Brand New Day wasn't as innovative or as grand as previous releases, but fans will enjoy some of the better moments." Elias noted that "by 1977, the musical landscape had changed, so this is closer to R&B and polished pop, rather than the amalgam of styles that the group was famous for."

== Track listing ==
Side one

1. "Somebody I Trusted (Put Out the Light)" (Daniel Moore) – 3:56
2. "Dreaming as One" (David Palmer, William Smith) – 4:10
3. "Same Old Blues" (J. J. Cale) – 3:07
4. "Lady Put Out The Light" (Guy Fletcher, Doug Flett) – 4:00
5. "Womanizer" (Randy Sharp) – 3:50

Side two

1. "Blue Street" (Randy Edelman) – 4:29
2. "Gimme That Wine" (Jon Hendricks) – 5:00
3. "Rock & Roll Queen (A Tribute to Janis Joplin)" (Bob Johnson, Phil Driscoll) – 5:10
4. "Don't Explain" (Arthur Herzog, Jr., Billie Holiday) – 6:00

Unofficial CD bonus tracks

1. "I'll Drown in My Own Tears" (Live) (Henry Glover) – 10:18
2. "Gimme That Wine" (Live) (Jon Hendricks) – 11:30
3. "Trouble in Mind/Shake a Hand" (live) – 6:38

== Personnel ==
- David Clayton-Thomas – lead vocals
- Bill Tillman – alto, tenor and baritone saxophones, flute
- Tony Klatka – trumpet, flugelhorn
- Forest Buchtell – trumpet, flugelhorn
- Dave Bargeron – trombone, bass trombone
- Mike Stern – guitars
- Larry Willis – keyboards
- Danny Trifan – bass
- Roy McCurdy – drums
- Bobby Colomby – percussion, backing vocals

=== Additional musicians ===
- Chaka Khan – co-lead vocals on "Dreaming As One"
- Tommy Morgan – harmonica
- Pete Jolly – Mussette oboe
- Paul Shure – strings
- Willie Smith – vocals, organ
- Brenda Bryant, Carl Graves, Ernie Watts, Glen Garrett, John Gross, John Mitchell, John Rosenberg, King Errison, Mike Altshul, Mike Finnigan, Paul Stallworth, Peter Graves, Ray Reed, Bob Payne, Stu Blumberg, Tish Smith, Tom Peterson, Venetta Fields – choir

== Production ==
- Produced by Roy Halee and Bobby Colomby
- Engineered by Roy Halee
- Mastered By: Stan Ricker
- Re-Mixed at: ABC Studios, Los Angeles
- Recorded at: United Western Recorders, Los Angeles and Criteria Studios, Miami
