= Jerry Sokolov =

American musician

Jerry Sokolov is a New York City-area trumpet player. He first trumpeted for Blood, Sweat & Tears from 1987 to 1994.
