= Nuclear Blues =

Studio album by Blood, Sweat & Tears
- Released: 1980
- Genre: Rock, jazz rock
- Length: 42:46
- Label: MCA, LAX
- Producer: Jerry Goldstein

Blood, Sweat & Tears chronology
Brand New Day (1977)	Nuclear Blues (1980)	Live and Improvised (1991)

Nuclear Blues is the eleventh studio album by band Blood, Sweat & Tears, released in 1980, as their first release for MCA/LAX Records. Nuclear Blues was produced by Jerry Goldstein, who had previously been known for his work with the band War. Even though it had only been three years since they released their last album Brand New Day, the band contained a new line-up with David Clayton-Thomas being the only remaining member from that period.

This album failed to make it onto the Billboard charts. This incarnation of Blood, Sweat & Tears disbanded the following year; although various incarnations of the group have existed and toured in the years since, to date this remains their final studio album.

Nuclear Blues was reissued in Germany in 1985 on the Platinum label under the title Latin Fire.

== Critical reception ==
Professional ratings
Review scores
Source	Rating
AllMusic	2/5 stars
MusicHound Rock: The Essential Album Guide	2/5 stars

The Globe and Mail noted that "there are no surprises here, just steady singing from David Clayton-Thomas, and some fairly unimaginative horn lines."

== Track listing ==
1. "Agitato" (Bruce Cassidy) – 5:51
2. "Nuclear Blues" (David Clayton-Thomas) – 4:24
3. "Manic Depression (Jimi Hendrix) – 4:18
4. "I'll Drown in My Own Tears" (Henry Glover) – 7:21
5. "Fantasy Stage" (David Clayton-Thomas, Robert Piltch) – 5:41
6. Spanish Wine Suite: – 15:11
  a. "Introduction La Cantina" (Robert Piltch)
  b. "(Theme) Spanish Wine" (Bruce Cassidy)
  c. "Latin Fire" (Bruce Cassidy, Dave Piltch, Vern Dorge, Bobby Economou, Richard Martinez, Earl Seymour)
  d. "The Challenge" (Bruce Cassidy, Dave Piltch, Vern Dorge, Bobby Economou, Richard Martinez, Earl Seymour)
  e. "The Duel" (Bruce Cassidy, Dave Piltch, Vern Dorge, Bobby Economou, Richard Martinez, Earl Seymour)
  f. "Amor" (Bruce Cassidy, Dave Piltch, Vern Dorge, Bobby Economou, Richard Martinez, Earl Seymour)

== Personnel ==
- David Clayton-Thomas – vocals
- Robert Piltch – guitar
- David Piltch – bass
- Bobby Economou – drums
- Richard Martinez – organ, piano, clavinet
- Bruce Cassidy – trumpet, fluegelhorn, Steiner electric trumpet
- Earl Seymour – baritone and tenor sax, flute
- Vern Dorge – alto and soprano Sax, flute
- William Smith – background vocals on "I'll Drown In My Own Tears"
- Lonnie Jordan – background vocals on "I'll Drown In My Own Tears"

Production

- Produced by Jerry Goldstein for Far Out Productions
- Recording engineer – Chris Huston
- Recorded at Coconuts Recording, Miami, Florida.
- Remixed at Sound City Studios, Los Angeles
- Mastered by Wally Traugott
