= New City (album) =

Studio album by Blood, Sweat & Tears
- Released: April 1975
- Genres: Rock, Jazz rock, Jazz funk
- Length: 43:09
- Label: Columbia
- Producer: Jimmy Ienner

Blood, Sweat & Tears chronology
Mirror Image (1974)	New City (1975)	In Concert (1976)

New City is the eighth album by the band Blood, Sweat & Tears, released by Columbia Records in April 1975. It peaked at Number 47 on the Billboard Pop Albums charts.

New City marks the return to the line-up of lead vocalist David Clayton-Thomas.

== Reception ==
Professional ratings
Review scores
Source	Rating
Allmusic	2/5 stars

Writing for Allmusic, critic Jason Elias wrote the album "It does sound promising, but, in all honesty, New City's fortunes seemed doomed from the start."

In 1976, bassist Ron McClure's composition “No Show” was nominated for a Grammy Award for Best Arrangement, Instrumental or A Cappella.

== Release history ==
In addition to the conventional two channel stereo version the album was also released by Columbia in a four channel quadraphonic edition on LP record and 8-track tape in 1975. The quad LP release was encoded in the SQ matrix system.

New City was reissued in the UK on the Super Audio CD format in 2019 by Dutton Vocalion. This release is a two albums on one disc compilation which also contains the 1974 Blood Sweat & Tears album Mirror Image. The Dutton Vocalion disc contains the complete stereo and quad versions of both albums.

== Track listing ==
1. "Ride Captain Ride" (Skip Konte, Franke Konte, Mike Pinera, Carlos Pinera) – 5:06
2. "Life" (Allen Toussaint) – 4:24
3. "No Show" (Ron McClure) – 5:15
4. "I Was a Witness to a War" (Danny Meehan, Bobby Scott) – 5:13
5. "One Room Country Shack" (John Lee Hooker, Traditional) – 2:24
6. "Applause" (Janis Ian) – 7:47
7. "Yesterday's Music" (Clayton-Thomas, William Smith) – 4:14
8. "Naked Man" (Randy Newman) – 4:00
9. "Got to Get You into My Life" (John Lennon, Paul McCartney) – 3:22
10. "Takin' It Home" (Bobby Colomby) – 1:37

== Personnel ==
- David Clayton-Thomas – vocals
- Dave Bargeron – trombone, tuba, baritone horn, bass trumpet
- Bobby Colomby – drums, percussion, background vocals
- Joe Giorgianni – trumpet, flugelhorn, piccolo trumpet
- Tony Klatka – trumpet, flugelhorn, piccolo trumpet
- Ron McClure – bass
- Bill Tillman – saxophone, background vocals
- Georg Wadenius – guitar, background vocals
- Larry Willis – keyboards
- Mike Corbett – background vocals

Production notes

- Jimmy Ienner – producer
- Greg Calbi – engineer
- Tom Dwyer – assistant
- Rod O'Brien – assistant engineer
- Carmine Rubino – engineer
- Shelly Yakus – engineer

== Charts ==
Album - Billboard (United States)

Year	Chart	Position
1975	Pop Albums	47
