= Dick Halligan =

American musician and composer (1943–2022)

- Born: Richard Bernard Halligan; August 29, 1943; Troy, New York, U.S.
- Died: January 18, 2022 (aged 78) Rome, Italy
- Genres: Rock, pop, jazz, chamber music
- Occupations: Musician, songwriter
- Instruments: Piano, organ, trombone, flute
- Years active: 1968– 20??
- Website: richardhalligan.com

Richard Bernard Halligan (August 29, 1943 – January 18, 2022) was an American musician and composer, best known as a founding member of the jazz-rock band Blood, Sweat & Tears.

== Career ==
Halligan was born in Troy, New York. He was BS&T's trombonist on their first album, Child Is Father to the Man, but when Al Kooper left the band after that first album, Halligan switched to keyboards and began playing flute as well. He received a Grammy Award for Best Instrumental Performance for "Variations on a Theme By Erik Satie" from the album Blood, Sweat & Tears. Halligan also arranged many of the band's charts during this time period, and he wrote several songs including "Redemption" and "Lisa Listen to Me." Halligan left BS&T in 1971 after recording their fourth album, when the band began to shift to more rock-oriented music.

In the 1970s and 1980s, Halligan composed and arranged music for a number of motion pictures, including Go Tell the Spartans (1978), Cheaper to Keep Her (1981), Fear City (1984), and the Chuck Norris films A Force of One (1979) and The Octagon (1980).

In 2006, he was active as a composer and performer for various types of music, including jazz and chamber music. In 2011 and 2012 he developed and performed an autobiographical one-man show entitled "Musical Being". An early title for it was "Man Overboard" and in 2013 called "Love, Sweat & Fears". Halligan earned a master's degree in music theory and composition from the Manhattan School of Music. He also conducted his original works in Carnegie Hall.

== Death ==
Halligan died from natural causes in Rome on January 18, 2022, at the age of 78. His daughter, Shana Halligan, was the vocalist of trip hop duo Bitter:Sweet.

== Discography ==
- Child Is Father to the Man (1968)
- Blood, Sweat & Tears (1968)
- Blood, Sweat & Tears 3 (1970)
- B, S & T 4 (1971)
- Cat's Dream (2007)
- Slow Food Forum (2007)
