= Blood, Sweat & Tears (Blood, Sweat & Tears album) =

Studio album by Blood, Sweat & Tears
- Released: December 11, 1968
- Recorded: October 7–22, 1968
- Studios: Columbia 30th Street, New York City
- Genres: Rock; jazz rock
- Length: 45:36 (Original)
- Label: Columbia
- Producer: James William Guercio

Blood, Sweat & Tears chronology
Child Is Father to the Man (1968)	Blood, Sweat & Tears (1968)	Blood, Sweat & Tears 3 (1970)

Singles from Blood, Sweat & Tears
- 1. "You've Made Me So Very Happy" Released: February 5, 1969; 2. "Spinning Wheel" Released: May 20, 1969; 3. "And When I Die" Released: September 30, 1969

Blood, Sweat & Tears is the second album by the American band Blood, Sweat & Tears, released on December 11, 1968. It was the most commercially successful album for the group, rising to the top of the U.S. charts for a collective seven weeks and yielding three successive Top 5 singles. It received a Grammy Award for Album of the Year in 1970. The album has been certified quadruple platinum by the RIAA, with sales of more than four million units in the U.S. In Canada, the album enjoyed a total of eight weeks at number 1 on the RPM national album chart.

== History ==
Al Kooper, Randy Brecker and Jerry Weiss had left BS&T after the first album. Founding members Bobby Colomby and Steve Katz searched for a replacement singer and selected David Clayton-Thomas. Three more musicians joined to bring the band to a total of nine members. Columbia assigned James William Guercio as producer for the album. Guercio was simultaneously working with the band Chicago.

"More and More", "Smiling Phases", and "You've Made Me So Very Happy" were among the songs that Kooper had arranged before leaving the group. Other arrangements were contributed by Fred Lipsius and Dick Halligan. The song selection was more pop oriented than the first album, with more compositions from outside the band.

The album was recorded at CBS's then state-of-the-art 30th Street Studio in New York City. The studio had just taken delivery of one of the first Ampex model MM-1000 16-track tape recorders. The new technology allowed for far more flexibility in overdubbing and mixing than the four- and eight-track studio recorders that were standard in 1968. This was among the first 16-track recordings released to the public.

An additional song, "Children of the Wind", was recorded at these sessions but left off the album. It later appeared on the compilation The Very Best of Blood, Sweat and Tears: What Goes Up!

== Reception ==
Professional ratings
Review scores
Source	Rating
AllMusic	4.5/5 stars
The Encyclopedia of Popular Music	5/5 stars
The Rolling Stone Record Guide	3/5 stars

In his AllMusic retrospective review, music critic William Ruhlmann called the players a "less adventurous unit" than on the debut album, but called the album "more accessible... It was a repertoire to build a career on, and Blood, Sweat & Tears did exactly that, although they never came close to equaling this album." In his lengthy contemporary review, Jon Landau of Rolling Stone dismissed the album, writing; "The listener responds to the illusion that he is hearing something new when in fact he is hearing mediocre rock, OK jazz, etc., thrown together in a contrived and purposeless way."

The album was voted number 660 in the third edition of Colin Larkin's All Time Top 1000 Albums (2000). It was selected for the 2006 book 1001 Albums You Must Hear Before You Die.

== Track listing ==
Side one
No.	Title	Writer(s)	Recorded	Length
1.	"Variations on a Theme by Erik Satie" (1st and 2nd Movements)	adapted from Trois Gymnopédies; arranged by Dick Halligan	October 9, 1968	2:35
2.	"Smiling Phases"	Steve Winwood, Jim Capaldi, Chris Wood	October 15, 1968	5:11
3.	"Sometimes in Winter"	Steve Katz	October 8, 1968	3:09
4.	"More and More"	Vee Pee Smith, Don Juan	October 15, 1968	3:04
5.	"And When I Die"	Laura Nyro	October 22, 1968	4:06
6.	"God Bless the Child"	Billie Holiday, Arthur Herzog Jr.	October 7, 1968	5:55
Total length:				23:50

Side two
No.	Title	Writer(s)	Recorded	Length
7.	"Spinning Wheel"	David Clayton-Thomas	October 9, 1968	4:08
8.	"You've Made Me So Very Happy"	Berry Gordy Jr., Brenda Holloway, Patrice Holloway, Frank Wilson	October 16, 1968	4:19
9.	"Blues – Part II"	Blood, Sweat & Tears; interpolating "Sunshine of Your Love" (Jack Bruce, Pete Brown, Eric Clapton), "Spoonful" (Willie Dixon) and "Somethin' Goin' On" (Al Kooper)	October 22, 1968	11:44
10.	"Variations on a Theme by Erik Satie" (1st Movement)	adapted from Trois Gymnopédies; arranged by Dick Halligan	October 9, 1968	1:49
Total length:				22:00

=== 2000 CD bonus tracks ===
No.	Title	Writer(s)	Recorded	Length
11.	"More and More" (Live at the Cafe Au Go Go)	Vee Pee Smith, Don Juan	August 2, 1968	4:38
12.	"Smiling Phases" (Live at the Cafe Au Go Go)	Steve Winwood, Jim Capaldi, Chris Wood	August 2, 1968	18:44

== Personnel ==
- David Clayton-Thomas – lead vocals except as noted
- Steve Katz – guitar, harmonica, vocals, lead vocals on "Sometimes in Winter"
- Jim Fielder – bass
- Dick Halligan – organ, piano, flute, trombone, vocals
- Fred Lipsius – alto saxophone, piano
- Lew Soloff – trumpet, flugelhorn
- Chuck Winfield – trumpet, flugelhorn
- Alan Rubin – trumpet on "Spinning Wheel"
- Jerry Hyman – trombone, recorder
- Bobby Colomby – drums, percussion, vocals

=== Production ===
- Producer: James William Guercio
- Engineers: Fred Catero, Roy Halee
- Arrangers: Dick Halligan, Fred Lipsius, Al Kooper
- Cover art: Timothy Quay, Bob Cato
- Photography: Harrie George
- Design: John Berg

== Charts ==
Album

Year	Chart	Position
1969 – Canada (3wks@#1)	Top 50 Albums	1
1969 – UK Albums Chart (United Kingdom)	Top 40 Albums	15
