= Jerry Weiss (musician) =

American trumpet and flugelhorn player (born 1946)

- Born: May 1, 1946 (age 79); New York City, U.S.
- Instrument(s): Trumpet, fluglehorn
- Formerly of: Blood, Sweat & Tears

Jerry Weiss (born May 1, 1946, in New York City) is an American trumpet and flugelhorn player, best known as a founding member of the jazz fusion band Blood, Sweat & Tears. He appeared on their critically acclaimed 1968 debut album, Child Is Father to the Man.

Weiss left soon afterwards to help form the short-lived horn-band, Ambergris, where he played bass guitar and piano and was the principal arranger. He also contributed three songs on the album and co-wrote another. Weiss has made infrequent appearances on recordings by other artists, including Al Kooper, a fellow Blood, Sweat & Tears member.
