= Blood, Sweat & Tears =

American rock music band

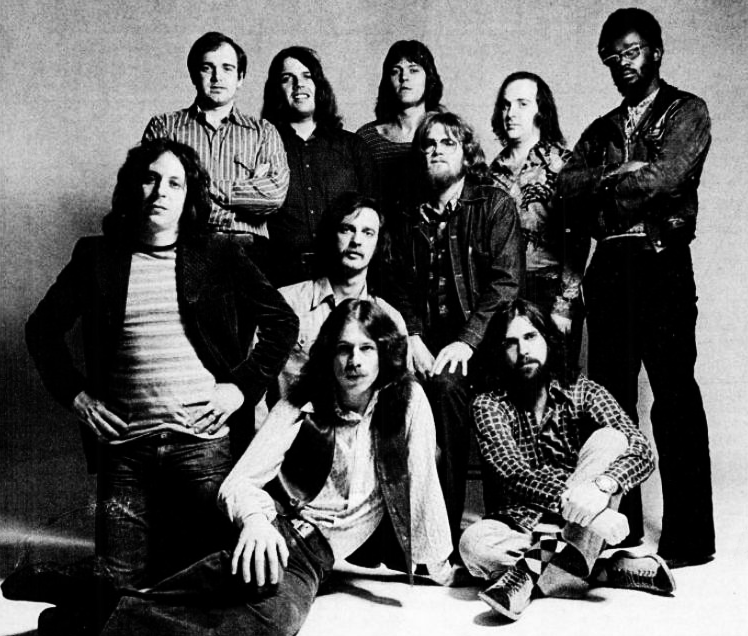
- BS&T in 1972

Background information
- Origin: New York City, U.S.
- Genres: Jazz rock; pop rock; R&B; psychedelic rock
- Years active: 1967–1981; 1984–present
- Labels: Columbia; ABC; Rhino; Sony; Mobile Fidelity; Wounded Bird
- Members: Glenn McClelland; Dylan Elise; Ric Fierabracci; Ozzie Melendez; Brad Mason; Anibal Rojas; Sam Ryan; Bryan Davis; Gabe Cummins
- Website: bloodsweatandtears.com

Blood, Sweat & Tears (also known as "BS&T") is an American jazz rock music group founded in New York City in 1967, noted for combining a brass section with rock band instrumentation. Their sound has merged rock, pop and R&B/soul music with big band jazz. The Canadian lead singer David Clayton-Thomas was added to the group in 1968 and stayed until 1972, marking their most successful period.

The group's second album, Blood, Sweat & Tears, spent seven weeks atop the U.S. charts in 1969, won the Grammy Award for Album of the Year in 1970, and contained the hit recordings "And When I Die", "You've Made Me So Very Happy", and "Spinning Wheel". On the Hot 100, all three peaked at number 2. The follow-up album, Blood, Sweat & Tears 3, also reached number 1 in the U.S.

In addition to original music, the group is known for arrangements of popular songs by Laura Nyro, James Taylor, Carole King, the Band, the Rolling Stones, Billie Holiday and many others. The group has also adapted music from Erik Satie, Thelonious Monk and Sergei Prokofiev into their arrangements. BS&T has gone through numerous iterations with varying personnel and has encompassed a wide range of musical styles.

The group was inspired by the "brass-rock" sound of the Buckinghams, and their producer James William Guercio, as well as the Maynard Ferguson Orchestra. BS&T's success paralleled that of similarly configured ensembles such as Chicago (also produced by Guercio) and the Electric Flag, but by the mid-1970s the group's popularity began a decline.

== Al Kooper era ==
Al Kooper (keyboards, vocals), Bobby Colomby (drums), Steve Katz (guitar, vocals), and Jim Fielder (bass) played at the Village Theatre (later renamed Fillmore East) in New York City on September 16, 1967, with James Cotton Blues Band opening. Kooper was the initial singer and musical director, having insisted on that position based on his work with the Blues Project, his previous band with Katz.

Fred Lipsius (alto sax, piano) joined the others a month later. A few more shows were played before Lipsius recruited horn players Dick Halligan, Randy Brecker and Jerry Weiss. The octet debuted as an opening act for Moby Grape at the Cafe Au Go Go in Greenwich Village on November 17–19, 1967, and then played The Scene the following week. Columbia Records president Clive Davis later said:

"It was the Cafe Au Go Go in the Village. I do remember sitting there, watching and listening, and being very, very impressed that this was a new sound. I had never seen horns used this way. Truthfully, it floored me. I was knocked out, and I agreed to sign them on the spot."

At Columbia, the group quickly released the album Child Is Father to the Man in February 1968. Supported by the single "I Can't Quit Her" the album reached number 47 on the Billboard Pop Albums chart in the United States and number 1 on the Cashbox chart.

Artistic differences quickly developed, with Colomby and Katz wanting to hire a stronger lead vocalist. This led to the departure of Kooper in April 1968. Prior to leaving, Kooper had already arranged some songs that would be on the second BS&T album. He was soon hired as a record producer at Columbia. Trumpeters Randy Brecker and Jerry Weiss also left and were replaced by Lew Soloff and Chuck Winfield. Brecker joined Horace Silver's band. Jerry Weiss went on to start the similarly styled group Ambergris.

== David Clayton-Thomas era ==
Colomby and Katz looked for a new vocalist and considered Alex Chilton, Stephen Stills, and Laura Nyro, before deciding on David Clayton-Thomas, from Toronto, Canada. Trombonist Halligan moved to organ and Jerry Hyman was added on trombone. The new nine-member band debuted at New York's Cafe Au Go Go on June 18, 1968, beginning a two-week residency.

The second album, Blood, Sweat & Tears, was produced by Guercio and much of the album was arranged by Halligan and Lipsius. It featured fewer original songs but greater chart success. It included Nyro's "And When I Die", "You've Made Me So Very Happy" by Berry Gordy and Brenda Holloway, and Clayton-Thomas' "Spinning Wheel". The band enjoyed headliner status at the Woodstock Festival in August 1969. A film crew caught a few songs, but the band's manager Bennett Glotzer ordered the crew to turn off the cameras and leave the stage since the band had not agreed nor been paid for filming.

The band went on a United States Department of State–sponsored tour of Eastern Europe in June–July 1970. Voluntary association with the U.S. government was highly unpopular with American rock fans who opposed the U.S. war in Vietnam. The band was criticized for allowing itself to be co-opted by President Richard Nixon's government. It is now known that the State Department pressured the group into the tour in exchange for a U.S. residency permit for Clayton-Thomas, who had a criminal record in Canada, and had been deported from the U.S. after overstaying his visa. The tour and its aftermath is the focus of a 2023 feature-length documentary titled What the Hell Happened to Blood, Sweat & Tears?

While away on tour, the label released Blood, Sweat & Tears 3 in June 1970, produced by Roy Halee and Colomby. The album was another success, spawning hit singles with Carole King's "Hi-De-Ho" and another Clayton-Thomas composition, "Lucretia MacEvil". The group recreated the sound of the previous album with more arrangements by Halligan and Lipsius. Reviews sometimes focused solely upon the band's work with the U.S. State Department, without discussing the music. Compounding the image problem was a decision to play a lucrative engagement at Caesars Palace on the Las Vegas Strip. This was unpopular at the time with young underground rock fans who identified Las Vegas entertainers with the music of their parents' generation.

In late 1970, the band produced soundtrack music for the film comedy The Owl and the Pussycat, which starred Barbra Streisand and George Segal.

The group reconvened in San Francisco in January 1971 with jazz writer/saxophonist Don Heckman serving as producer. With Dave Bargeron replacing Jerry Hyman, they recorded their fourth album, BS&T 4, released in June 1971. Notable tracks included David Clayton-Thomas' "Go Down Gamblin'" and Al Kooper's "Holy John (John the Baptist)". BS&T 4 earned the group a Gold record, however, none of the singles reached the Top 30. During this period the group's popular and commercial success began to decline.

After a final show at Anaheim Convention Center on December 31, 1971, Clayton-Thomas left in early January 1972 to pursue a solo career. Columbia issued a Greatest Hits album in February 1972. This album contained edited single versions of some songs, rather than the full-length album versions. It earned a Gold record award in the US, the last BS&T album to do so.

== Jerry Fisher era ==
Clayton-Thomas was briefly replaced by Bobby Doyle and then Jerry Fisher. Fred Lipsius left as well and was briefly replaced by Joe Henderson, before Lou Marini settled into the new lineup. Founding member Halligan also departed, replaced by jazz pianist Larry Willis (from the Cannonball Adderley Quintet), and Swedish guitarist Georg Wadenius, from the popular Swedish outfit Made in Sweden, joined as lead guitarist around the same time.

BS&T released New Blood in September 1972, which found the group moving into a more overtly jazz-fusion direction. The album reached the top 40 on the Billboard chart and spawned a charting single "So Long Dixie", which peaked at number 44. Also included was a version of Herbie Hancock's "Maiden Voyage", featuring Wadenius. In January 1973 Katz left to pursue a career as a producer. In March Winfield departed as well and was replaced by Tom Malone.

The next album, No Sweat (June 1973), featured horn work from Tom Malone. He soon left to make way for trumpeter John Madrid. But Madrid's tenure was likewise short-lived and he never recorded with the band. Both Madrid and Soloff left in late 1973, making way for new horn player/arranger Tony Klatka on the next release, Mirror Image (July 1974), which also saw the addition of vocalist/saxophonist Jerry LaCroix (formerly of Edgar Winter's White Trash), sax player Bill Tillman, bassist Ron McClure and the exodus of original bass player Jim Fielder. This album shows the influences of Philly Soul, Herbie Hancock's Head Hunters and Chick Corea's group Return to Forever.

Jerry LaCroix left BS&T to join Rare Earth after playing a final show at Wollman Rink in New York's Central Park on July 27, 1974. Luther Kent, a blues singer from New Orleans, replaced LaCroix.

== Reformations ==
By the close of 1974 Jerry Fisher was tired of BS&T's heavy touring schedule. Colomby and manager Fred Heller engineered the return of Clayton-Thomas in the hope of restoring the band's former success. Clayton-Thomas met the group at a show near Milwaukee in August 1974 while Jerry Fisher and Luther Kent were still with the band. All three singers appeared on stage before a wildly enthusiastic crowd.

The album New City, in April 1975, featured Clayton-Thomas along with new horn player Joe Giorgianni. It reached number 47 on the US Billboard album chart. The album has half original material along with songs from Janis Ian, Randy Newman, and Blues Image. The highest-charting song was the Beatles’ “Got to Get You into My Life" which peaked at number 62.

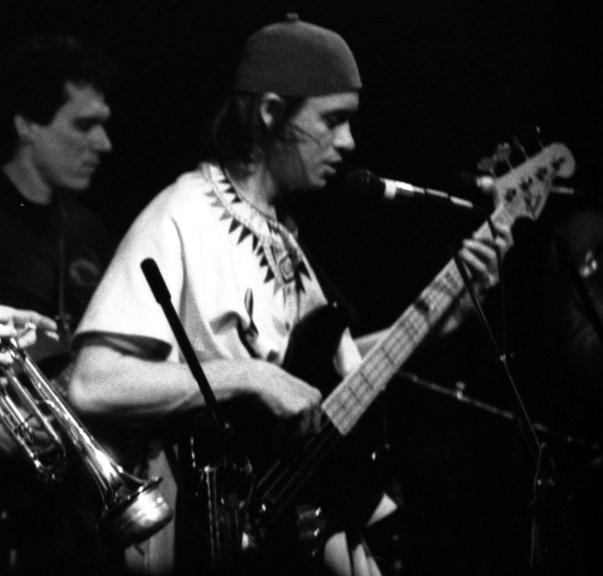
Bassist Jaco Pastorius, with Jorma Kaukonen (rear, left) performing in the Lone Star, New York City

In the summer of 1975, BS&T recorded a live album that was released in Europe and Japan the following year as In Concert. And this album was eventually released in the US as Live and Improvised in May 1991. The album featured different guitarists on different nights: Wadenius, Steve Khan and Mike Stern, the last who took over permanently for a time (Jeff Richman filled in for Stern in mid-1976). Jazz percussionist Don Alias was also present for the live album. After recording, Giorgianni left and was replaced by Forrest Buchtel (formerly of Woody Herman's band).

Around the same period, Colomby discovered a talented bass player by the name of Jaco Pastorius in Florida. He produced Pastorius' first solo album which was released in the spring of 1976. In late 1975, Pastorius toured with BS&T subbing for Ron McClure and when McClure left in early 1976, Colomby arranged for Pastorius to join the band, though he stayed for only about three months. On April 1, 1976, Pastorius joined Weather Report. Pastorius was briefly succeeded by Keith Jones before Danny Trifan stepped in.

In 1975 the group was offered a slot at the Newport Jazz Festival in Newport, Rhode Island. The city government was concerned that a "rock band" would attract a rowdy audience; it threatened to revoke the concert permit if BS&T was not removed from the program. Ultimately, concert organizers were able to force the event forward via judicial injunction. The litigation reached the United States Supreme Court.

In July 1976 More Than Ever, produced by Bob James and featuring guest vocals by Patti Austin and appearances by a host of NYC session players, including pianist Richard Tee, guitarists Eric Gale and Hugh McCracken, trumpeter Jon Faddis and Eric Weissberg (banjo, dobro), was released but sold disappointingly. After it stalled at US No. 165, Columbia Records dropped the band. At this time Colomby, BS&T's sole remaining original member, stopped touring with the group and Don Alias assumed sole percussion duties before leaving as well to make way for Roy McCurdy.

In 1977 BS&T signed with ABC Records and began working on Brand New Day (November 1977). The album was co-produced by Colomby, but his direct involvement with the group ceased after this release. Colomby was by this point the sole owner of the BS&T trademark name. Brand New Day garnered positive reviews but slow sales. At this same time BS&T were said to be recording tracks for an instrumental album with a personnel of Tony Klatka, Forrest Buchtel, Dave Bargeron, Bill Tillman, Larry Willis, Danny Trifan, Roy McCurdy and Mike Stern, but the album never appeared.

During 1977 the BS&T lineup was again in flux. Stern, Trifan, McCurdy, Buchtel and Tillman all departed to be succeeded respectively by Randy Bernsen, Neil Stubenhaus, Michael Lawrence and Gregory Herbert. Barry Finnerty then took over guitar and Chris Albert trumpet when Bernsen and Lawrence left at the close of the year.

In January 1978 the group undertook a European tour that ended abruptly after 31-year-old saxophonist Gregory Herbert died of a drug overdose in Amsterdam on January 31, 1978. Rocked by the event, the group returned home as this lineup ceased all its activities.

In 1979, with the encouragement of longtime BS&T manager Fred Heller, who had numerous requests for the band to play more shows, Clayton-Thomas was persuaded to continue Blood, Sweat & Tears with an entirely new lineup that consisted of himself and other Canadian musicians (Kenny Marco – guitar, David Piltch – bass, Joe Sealy – keyboards, Bruce Cassidy – trumpet, flugelhorn, Earl Seymour – sax, flute, Steve Kennedy – sax, flute and Sally Chappis – drums, with Harvey Kogan soon replacing Kennedy and Jack Scarangella succeeding Chappis).

The group signed to Avenue Records subsidiary label LAX (MCA Records), with a slightly altered lineup of: David Clayton-Thomas (vocals, guitar), Robert Piltch (guitar), David Piltch (bass), Richard Martinez (keyboards), Bruce Cassidy (trumpet, flugelhorn), Earl Seymour (sax, flute), Vernon Dorge (sax, flute) and a returning Bobby Economou on drums, and with producer and arranger Jerry Goldstein, recorded the album Nuclear Blues (March 1980). The album was yet another attempt to reinvent the group, showcasing the band in a funk sound environment that recalled such acts as Tower of Power and LAX labelmates War (with whom BS&T did several shows in 1980). The album was regarded by many Blood, Sweat & Tears fans as uncharacteristic of the group's best work.

During this period, another live album was recorded at The Street Scene in Los Angeles, California, on October 12, 1980 (this was eventually released as Live in February 1995). Robert and David Piltch left shortly before this concert, as did Richard Martinez. They were replaced by Wayne Pedzwiatr on bass, Peter Harris on guitar and Lou Pomanti on keyboards. And Mic Gillette (from Tower of Power) replaced Cassidy on trumpet at the tail end of 1980. Following more touring, including Australia, this incarnation of the group disbanded in 1981.

Since he did not own the rights to the Blood Sweat & Tears name, Clayton-Thomas attempted to restart his solo career in 1983 after taking some time off. This caused complications on the road when promoters would book Clayton-Thomas' group and use the Blood, Sweat & Tears name on the marquee. Consequently, his manager Larry Dorr negotiated a licensing deal with Colomby in 1984 for rights to tour with the BS&T name.

For 20 years afterwards, Clayton-Thomas toured the concert circuit with a constantly changing roster of players (see roster below) as "Blood, Sweat & Tears" until his final departure in November 2004. Clayton-Thomas, now residing back in Canada, continued his solo career and did occasional shows using only his name.

In 1998, to celebrate thirty years after he first joined the group, David Clayton-Thomas began work on a solo CD titled Bloodlines that featured a dozen former members of Blood, Sweat & Tears, (Tony Klatka, Fred Lipsius, Lew Soloff, Dave Bargeron, Randy Brecker and others) performing on the album and providing arrangements to some of the songs. Released in 1999, it was first only available at Clayton-Thomas' concerts but made more widely available in 2001.

BS&T continued on without Clayton-Thomas. Dorr has been manager (and much more) for over 30 years now, and the band is still a popular touring act. At last count, the overall number of BS&T members since the beginning is up around 165 total people (see roster below).

On March 12 and 13, 1993 Al Kooper organized two shows at the Bottom Line in NYC that were advertised as "A Silver Anniversary Celebration of the Classic Album The Child Is Father to the Man", which featured Kooper, Randy Brecker, Jim Fielder, Steve Katz and Fred Lipsius playing together for the first time in 25 years, accompanied by Anton Fig, Tom Malone, Lew Soloff, John Simon and Jimmy Vivino, as well as a two-woman chorus and string section.

The following year, in early February 1994, Kooper returned to the Bottom Line for his 50th birthday celebration, in which he played with members of his new band plus the Blues Project & BS&T. The BS&T lineup at this show was the same as the 1993 Silver Anniversary show, with the exception of Will Lee sitting in for Fielder and John Sebastian (ex-Loving Spoonful) contributing harmonica. Colomby would not allow Kooper to use the name Blood, Sweat & Tears, so the two reunions were billed as "Child Is Father To The Man". This second show appeared as the CD Soul of a Man in 1995. According to page 20 of the CD's liner notes, Steve Katz elected not to allow his performances onto the CD, which were digitally replaced by Jimmy Vivino. Bassist Jim Fielder is said to have added some parts to the CD as well.

Since late 2005, the band resumed touring with a refreshed line up. The band's first world tour in a decade took place in 2007. That year, the then-current BS&T horn-section appeared on five tracks of the Jeff Lorber album He Had a Hat. From 2008 through 2010, Katz returned to appear at BS&T's shows as a special guest. BS&T and Chicago co-headlined a jazz festival in Stuttgart, Germany, on July 9, 2011, and they also appeared on the same bill together again at Gretna Heritage Festival in Gretna, Louisiana, on October 5, 2013.

From 2013 until 2018, Blood Sweat and Tears was fronted by Bo Bice, who was the runner-up against Carrie Underwood in the fourth season of American Idol.

In 2018 the group decided to replace Bice with former Tower of Power singer Tom Bowes, who had previously done a brief stint with BS&T back in July through November 2012. In 2019 Keith Paluso, from the reality TV show The Voice, was chosen as BS&T's new singer

In March 2022 original bassist Jim Fielder guested with the group at a series of shows in Florida.

Under the direction of Dorr and Colomby, the band has enjoyed something of a resurgence. Blood, Sweat & Tears donated money through its "Elsie Monica Colomby" music scholarship fund to deserving schools and students who need help in prolonging their musical education, such as the victims of Hurricane Katrina.

Similar to their 2006-2007 appearances with Three Dog Night's Chuck Negron, the band started off 2025 touring with former Chicago singer Jason Scheff as a special guest.

David Clayton-Thomas died in a Toronto hospital on June 24, 2026, at the age of 84.

== Members ==
- Glenn McClelland: keyboards (1987–1993, 1998, 2005–present)
- Dylan Elise: drums (2015–present)
- Ric Fierabracci: bass, vocals (2016–present)
- Ozzie Melendez: trombone (2018 - fill in, 2022–present)
- Brad Mason: trumpet- MD (2015, 2016–present)
- Anibal Rojas: sax (2017, 2019, 2021 - fill in, 2024-present)
- Sam Ryan: vocals (2019 - fill in, 2023, 2024-present)
- Bryan Davis: trumpet (2021–present)
- Gabe Cummins: guitar, backing vocals (2024–present)

=== Past members ===
Original eight

- Al Kooper: keyboards, vocals (1967–1968)
- Randy Brecker: trumpet, flugelhorn (1967–1968)
- Jerry Weiss: trumpet, flugelhorn, backing vocals (1967–1968)
- Fred Lipsius: alto sax, keyboards (1967–1972)
- Dick Halligan: keyboards, trombone, horns, flute, backing vocals (1967–1972) †
- Steve Katz: guitar, harmonica, flute, mandolin, vocals (1967–73, and as a special guest at some shows 2008–10)
- Jim Fielder: bass, guitar, backing vocals (1967–1974, special guest March 2022)
- Bobby Colomby: drums, percussion, backing vocals (1967–1977)

Other members

- David Clayton-Thomas: vocals, guitar (1968–1972, 1974–1981, 1984–2004)†
- Lew Soloff: trumpet, flugelhorn (1968–1973) †
- Chuck Winfield: trumpet, flugelhorn, backing vocals (1968–1973)
- Jerry Hyman: trombones, recorder (1968–1970)
- Dave Bargeron: trombone, tuba, horns, bass, backing vocals (1970–1978) †
- Bobby Doyle: vocals, piano (1972) †
- Joe Henderson: tenor sax (1972) †
- Lou Marini Jr.: tenor & soprano sax, flute (1972–1974)
- Larry Willis: keyboards (1972–1978) †
- Georg Wadenius: guitar, vocals (1972–1975) †
- Jerry Fisher: vocals (1972–1974)
- Tom Malone: trombone, trumpet, flugelhorn, alto sax, bass (1973)
- John Madrid: trumpet, flugelhorn (1973)
- Jerry LaCroix: vocals, alto sax, flute, harmonica (1974) †
- Ron McClure: bass (1974–1975, 1976)
- Tony Klatka: trumpet, horns (1974–1978)
- Bill Tillman: alto sax, flute, clarinet, backing vocals (1974–1977) †
- Luther Kent: vocals (1974) †
- Joe Giorgianni: trumpet, flugelhorn (1974–1975)
- Jaco Pastorius: bass (1975–1976) †
- Steve Khan: guitar (1975)
- Mike Stern: guitar (1975–1977)
- Keith Jones: bass (1976)
- Danny Trifan: bass (1976–1977)
- Forrest Buchtel: trumpet (1975–1977)
- Don Alias: percussion (1975–1976) †
- Roy McCurdy: drums (1976–1977)
- Jeff Richman: guitar (1976 fill in for Stern)
- Randy Bernsen: guitar (1977)
- Barry Finnerty: guitar (1977–1978)
- Neil Stubenhaus: bass (1977–1978)
- Gregory Herbert: saxophone (1977–1978) †
- Michael Lawrence: trumpet (1977) †
- Chris Albert: trumpet (1977–1978)
- Bobby Economou: drums (1977–1978, 1979–1981, 1994–1995)
- Kenny Marco: guitar (1979)
- David Piltch: bass (1979–1980)
- Joe Sealy: keyboards (1979)
- Bruce Cassidy: trumpet, flugelhorn (1979–1980)
- Earl Seymour: sax, flute (1979–1981) †
- Steve Kennedy: sax, flute (1979)
- Sally Chappis: drums (1979)
- Harvey Kogan: sax, flute (1979)
- Jack Scarangella: drums (1979)
- Vernon Dorge: sax, flute (1979–1981)
- Robert Piltch: guitar (1979–1980)
- Richard Martinez: keyboards (1979–1980)
- Wayne Pedzwater: bass (1980–1981) †
- Peter Harris: guitar (1980–1981)
- Lou Pomanti: keyboards (1980–1981)
- Mic Gillette: trumpet (1980–1981) †
- James Kidwell: guitar (1984–1985)
- Al Hospers: bass (1984–1985)
- Jeff Michael Andrews: bass (1984–1985) †
- Taras Kovayl: keyboards (1984–1985)
- Tim Ouimette: trumpet, horns (1984–1985)
- Mario Cruz: sax, flute (1984–1985)
- Ricky Sebastian: drums (1984–1985)
- Steve Guttman: trumpet (1985–2005)
- Dave Gellis: guitar (1985–1990, 1996, fill in – 1998, 2005–2016, 2017, 2018)
- Ray Peterson: bass (1985–1986)
- Scott Kreitzer: sax, flute (1985–1986)
- Teddy Mulet: trombone (1985–1986), trumpet (2005–2013)
- Barry Danielian: trumpet (1985–1986, 2013–2014)
- Richard Sussman: keyboards (1985–1987)
- Randy Andos: trombone (1986)
- Tom Timko: sax, flute (1986–87, 1995, 1998–2001, 2005–08, 2009–10)
- Tom DeFaria: drums (1985–1986)
- John Conte: bass (1986–1987)
- Steve Conte: guitar (1986, 2013)
- Jeff Gellis: bass (1987–1990)
- Charley Gordon: trombone (1987, 1988–1994, 2001, 2013–2014)
- Dave Panichi: trombone (1987–1988, 1997–1998)
- Dave Riekenberg: sax, flute (1987–1990, 1995–1998)
- Jerry Sokolov: trumpet (1987–1994)
- Graham Hawthorne: drums (1987–1988, 1989–1991)
- Van Romaine: drums (1988–1989)
- Nick Saya: drums (1991)
- Neil Capolongo: drums (1991–1993)
- Peter Abbott: drums (fill in – early 1990s)
- Wayne Schuster: sax, flute (1990–1991)
- Larry DeBari: guitar, vocals (1990–1997) †
- Gary Foote: bass (1990–1994, 1996–2004, 2005–2012)
- Jack Bashcow: sax, flute (1992)
- Tim Ries: sax, flute (1992–1993, 1993–1995)
- Matt King: keyboards (1994–1998)
- Mike Mancini: keyboards (fill in – 1980s/1990s)
- Henry Hey: keyboards (fill in – mid-1990s)
- Cliff Korman: keyboards (fill in – mid-1990s)
- Mike DuClos: bass (1994–1996)
- Jonathan Peretz: drums (1995–1997)
- Craig Johnson: trumpet (1994–1998)
- Matt Milmerstadt: drums (1995, 1998)
- Tom Guarna: guitar (1997–1998)
- Jon Owens: trumpet (1998–2000)
- Charles Pillow: sax, flute (fill in – 1998)
- Brian Delaney: drums (1997–1998, 2001)
- Dave Stahl: trumpet (fill in – 1995–1999)
- Winston Byrd: trumpet (fill in – 1998)
- Dave Pietro: sax, flute (fill in – 1998)
- Dale Kirkland: trombone (1995–96, 1998, 1999–2001, 2002–06, fill in – 2007)
- Pat Hallaran: trombone (1998–1999)
- James Fox: guitar (1998–2000)
- Dan Zank: keyboards (1998–2000)
- Zach Danziger: drums (1998–2001)
- Joe Mosello: trumpet (2000–2002)
- Gil Parris: guitar (2000)
- Gregg Sullivan: guitar (2000–2004)
- Phil Magallanes: keyboards (2000–2001)
- Chris Fischer: keyboards (2001)
- Andrea Valentini: drums (2001–2012)
- Darcy Hepner: sax, flute (1999 fill in, 2001–2004)
- John Samorian: keyboards (2001–2003)
- Nick Marchione: trumpet (2002–2004, fill-in – 2015)
- Eric Cortright: keyboards (2003–2004)
- Leo Huppert: bass (2004)
- Steve Jankowski: trumpet (2005–2013)
- Rob Paparozzi: vocals, harmonica (2005–2011)
- Scottie Wallace: vocals (alternating with Rob P. – 2005–2006)
- Thomas Connor: vocals, harmonica (2006-2008, fill in 2008-2019)
- Tommy Mitchell: vocals (fill in 1 show 2007)
- Jens Wendelboe: trombone (2006–2013)
- Chris Tedesco: trumpet (fill in for Mulet – 2007)
- Brian Steel: sax (fill in – 2008)
- Bill Churchville: trumpet (fill in – 2008)
- Ken Gioffre: sax (2010–2015, 2016–present)
- Jon Pruitt: keyboards (fill in for McClelland – 2010)
- Ralph Bowen: sax (fill in for Gioffre – 2011)
- Dave Anderson: bass (fill in for Foote – 2011, joined 2012–2013)
- Jason Paige: vocals (2011–2012)
- Bernard Purdie: drums (sat in for 1 tune 2011)
- Tom Bowes: vocals (2012, 2018)
- David Aldo: vocals (2012–2013)
- Joel Rosenblatt: drums (2012–2015, fill in for Elise - June 2017, 2024)
- Bo Bice: vocals (2013–2018)
- Jon Ossman: bass (2013–2014)
- Michael Davis: trombone (2013)
- Carl Fischer: trumpet (2013–2015, 2016)
- Dan Levine: trombone (2014 & 2015 – fill in, 2016–2018)
- Dillon Kondor: guitar (fill-in – 2014-2016, 2017–2018)
- Buster Hemphill: bass (2014–2016, 2018, 2022 - fill in, 2024)
- Trevor Neumann: trumpet (2014–2016)
- Brandon Wright: sax (2014 – fill in)
- Mike Cottone: trumpet (2015–2016)
- Mike Boscarino: trombone (2015–2016, 2018, 2019-2022)
- Leonardo Amuedo: guitar (2016)
- Jonathan Powell: trumpet (2017-2021)
- Adam Klipple: keyboards (2017 - fill in, 2019–2026)
- Mark Miller: trombone (2017, 2018 - fill in)
- Frank David Greene: trumpet (2017 - fill in)
- Bryan Davis: trumpet (2017, 2026 - fill in)
- Brian Bonvissuto: trombone (2017 - fill in)
- Greg Mayo: guitar (2018)
- Julian Coryell: guitar vocals (2018 - fill in, 2019 - 2022)
- Chris Rodriguez: guitar vocals (2019)
- Hadrien Feraud: bass (2019 - fill in)
- Keith Paluso: vocals (2019-2026)
- Nir Felder: guitar (2022-2026)
- Chris Shutters: vocals (2023-fill in)
- Ravi Best: trumpet (2021-2026)
- Dustin Rehrig: drums (2026 - fill in)

== Discography ==
- Child Is Father to the Man (1968)
- Blood, Sweat & Tears (1968)
- Blood, Sweat & Tears 3 (1970)
- B, S & T; 4 (1971)
- New Blood (1972)
- No Sweat (1973)
- Mirror Image (1974)
- New City (1975)
- More Than Ever (1976)
- Brand New Day (1977)
- Nuclear Blues (1980)
