= Child Is Father to the Man =

Album by Blood, Sweat & Tears

Studio album by Blood, Sweat & Tears
- Released: February 21, 1968
- Recorded: November 11 – December 20, 1967
- Genre: Jazz rock
- Length: 49:28
- Label: Columbia
- Producer: John Simon

Blood, Sweat & Tears chronology
| Child Is Father to the Man (1968) | Blood, Sweat & Tears (1968) |

Singles from Child Is Father to the Man
- 1. "I Can't Quit Her" Released: May 28, 1968

Child Is Father to the Man is the debut album by Blood, Sweat & Tears, released in February 1968. It reached number 47 on the Billboard albums chart in the United States.

== History ==
As a teenager, Al Kooper went to a concert for jazz trumpeter Maynard Ferguson and this experience inspired Kooper to start a rock band with a horn section. Originally in a band called The Blues Project, Kooper left after band leader Danny Kalb rejected his idea of bringing in a horn section. He then left for the West Coast and found bassist Jim Fielder who believed in the songs that Kooper wrote. Though Kooper had big ideas for his next project, he didn't have the money to bring his ideas to fruition. He then threw a benefit for himself and invited several musicians he previously worked with, such as Judy Collins, Simon & Garfunkel, David Blue, Eric Andersen and Richie Havens. Although the performances sold out, the owner of the Cafe Au Go Go added such numerous expenses to the gross receipts that the net receipts after the performance were not enough to get a plane ticket or a taxi to the airport.

Kooper later called Fielder and convinced him to come to New York. He also asked Bobby Colomby, Anderson and Steve Katz, who was his bandmate in his former band The Blues Project. Colomby called Fred Lipsius and the band placed an ad in The Village Voice for more horn players. Within a month, the band assembled an eight piece which also contained Randy Brecker, Jerry Weiss and Dick Halligan. Kooper then asked John Simon to produce them, after being fresh off from producing Simon & Garfunkel's album Bookends. The album was recorded in two weeks in December 1967. Simon asked all of the members to record their material in one take so he could study songs and make useful suggestions to the arrangements. After a brief promotional tour, Colomby and Katz ousted Kooper from the band, which led to Child is Father to the Man being the only BS&T album on which Kooper ever appeared. The band would later have two number one albums and several Grammys, although Kooper felt they were playing music that he didn't agree with. Despite being asked to leave Blood, Sweat & Tears, Kooper felt everything worked out well for him and the band.

== Commercial performance ==
In the United States, Child Is Father to the Man peaked at #47 on Billboard's Pop Albums chart. It failed to generate any Top 40 singles, although "I Love You More Than You'll Ever Know" and "I Can't Quit Her" found some play on progressive rock radio.

In 2012, the album was ranked number 266 on Rolling Stone magazine's list of the 500 greatest albums of all time.

The title is a quotation from a similarly titled poem by Gerard Manley Hopkins, slightly misquoting a poem by William Wordsworth called "My Heart Leaps Up".

CBS Records released The Rock Machine Turns You On, the first budget sampler LP, in the UK in 1968. The song "My Days Are Numbered" was included as Side Two track one on the album and introduced BS&T to a much wider audience.

The album was re-released in the UK in 1973, entitled "The First Album" on Embassy Records, a subsidiary of Columbia Records (catalogue number EMB 31028) with an identical track listing and the same picture on the front of the sleeve. The rear had new sleeve notes written by English DJ, Noel Edmonds.

== Reception ==
Professional ratings
Review scores
| Source | Rating |
|---|---|
| AllMusic | 5/5 stars |
| Rolling Stone | Positive |

Writing for AllMusic, critic William Ruhlman wrote of the album:

"Al Kooper's finest work, an album on which he moves the folk-blues-rock amalgamation of the Blues Project into even wider pastures, taking in classical and jazz elements (including strings and horns), all without losing the pop essence that makes the hybrid work. This is one of the great albums of the eclectic post-Sgt. Pepper era of the late '60s, a time when you could borrow styles from Greenwich Village contemporary folk to San Francisco acid rock and mix them into what seemed to have the potential to become a new American musical form... This is the sound of a group of virtuosos enjoying itself in the newly open possibilities of pop music. Maybe it couldn't have lasted; anyway, it didn't."

The song "I Love You More Than You'll Ever Know" found new life from 2002 to 2004, as Late Show with David Letterman band leader Paul Shaffer performed it regularly during the show's final full commercial break. The performances became more and more animated over time, including celebrity guests such as Ted Koppel, Nathan Lane, and others draping a cape over a kneeling Shaffer and attempting to lead him off stage before he stormed back to continue the song (a tribute to a similar gimmick employed by James Brown).

== Track listing ==
All tracks written by Al Kooper, except where noted.

Side one
| No. | Title | Writer(s) | Length |
|---|---|---|---|
| 1. | "Overture" | | 1:32 |
| 2. | "I Love You More Than You'll Ever Know" | | 5:57 |
| 3. | "Morning Glory" | Larry Beckett, Tim Buckley | 4:16 |
| 4. | "My Days Are Numbered" | | 3:19 |
| 5. | "Without Her" | Harry Nilsson | 2:41 |
| 6. | "Just One Smile" | Randy Newman | 4:38 |
| Total length: | | | 22:23 |

Side two
| No. | Title | Writer(s) | Length |
|---|---|---|---|
| 7. | "I Can't Quit Her" | Kooper, Irwin Levine | 3:38 |
| 8. | "Meagan's Gypsy Eyes" | Steve Katz | 3:24 |
| 9. | "Somethin' Goin' On" | | 8:00 |
| 10. | "House in the Country" | | 3:04 |
| 11. | "The Modern Adventures of Plato, Diogenes and Freud" | | 4:12 |
| 12. | "So Much Love / Underture" | Gerry Goffin, Carole King | 4:47 |
| Total length: | | | 27:05 |

1994 Master Sound edition bonus tracks (Columbia CK 64214)
| No. | Title | Writer(s) | Length |
|---|---|---|---|
| 13. | "I Love You More Than You'll Ever Know" (demo version - mono) | | 6:10 |
| 14. | "Refugee from Yuhupitz" (Instrumental - demo version - mono) | | 3:44 |
| 15. | "I Can't Quit Her" (demo version - mono) | Kooper, Levine | 3:00 |
| 16. | "Morning Glory" (demo version - mono) | Beckett, Buckley | 4:11 |
| 17. | "Somethin' Going On" (demo version - mono) | | 5:19 |
| 18. | "The Modern Adventures of Plato, Diogenes and Freud" (demo version - mono) | | 5:03 |
| Total length: | | | 27:27 76:55 |

2000 remastered edition bonus tracks
| No. | Title | Length |
|---|---|---|
| 13. | "Refugee from Yuhupitz" (Instrumental - demo version - mono) | 3:44 |
| 14. | "I Love You More Than You'll Ever Know" (demo version - mono) | 6:10 |
| 15. | "The Modern Adventures of Plato, Diogenes and Freud" (demo version - mono) | 5:03 |
| Total length: | | 14:57 64:25 |

2012 remastered Limited edition 24k gold bonus tracks (IMPEX IMP8306)
| No. | Title | Writer(s) | Length |
|---|---|---|---|
| 13. | "I Love You More Than You'll Ever Know" (Demo - mono) | | 6:13 |
| 14. | "Refugee From Yuhupitz" (Instrumental - Demo - mono) | | 3:46 |
| 15. | "I Can't Quit Her" (Demo - mono) | Levine-Kooper | 3:04 |
| 16. | "The Modern Adventures of Plato, Diogenes and Freud" (Demo - mono) | | 5:25 |
| Total length: | | | 18:28 67:56 |

== Personnel ==
Blood, Sweat & Tears

- Al Kooper – organ, piano; lead vocals (tracks 2, 4–7, 9–12); ondioline (track 8)
- Fred Lipsius – piano, alto saxophone
- Randy Brecker – trumpet, flugelhorn
- Jerry Weiss – trumpet, flugelhorn; backing vocals (track 4)
- Dick Halligan – trombone
- Steve Katz – guitars; lead vocals (tracks 3, 8); backing vocals (tracks 3); lute (track 6)
- Jim Fielder – bass guitar, fretless bass guitar
- Bobby Colomby – drums, percussion; backing vocals (tracks 4, 10)

Additional musicians

- Fred Catero – sound effects
- Al Gorgoni – organ, guitar, vocals
- Doug James – shaker
- The BS&T String Ensemble
  - Anahid Ajemian – violin
  - Manny Green – violin
  - Gene Orloff – violin
  - Harry Katzman – violin
  - Harry Lookofsky – violin
  - Julie Held – violin
  - Leo Kruczek – violin
  - Paul Gershman – violin
  - Manny Vardi – viola
  - Harold Coletta – viola
  - Alan Schulman – cello
  - Charles McCracken – cello
- The BS&T Soul Chorus
  - Melba Moore (as Melba Moorman) – backing vocals
  - Valerie Simpson – backing vocals
- John Simon – organ, piano, conductor, cowbell
- The Strings

== Production ==
- Producers: Bob Irwin, John Simon
- Engineer: Fred Catero
- Mixing: John Simon
- Mastering: Vic Anesini
- Arrangers: Fred Catero, Al Gorgoni, Fred Lipsius, Alan Schulman, John Simon
- Art direction: Howard Fritzson
- Photography: Bob Cato, Don Hunstein
- Packaging: Michael Cimicata

== Charts ==
| Chart (1968) | Peak position |
|---|---|
| US Billboard 200 Billboard Top LP's, August 1, 1968 | 47 |

== Certifications ==
| Region | Certification | Certified units/sales |
|---|---|---|
| United States (RIAA) | Gold | 500,000^{^} |
^{^} Shipments figures based on certification alone.

== Covers ==
- In 2015, "I Love You More Than You'll Ever Know" performed by Italian singer Luca Ronka in Soul Man album
- In 2013, "I Love You More Than You'll Ever Know" on the album Seesaw by Beth Hart & Joe Bonamassa
- In 2008, "I Love You More Than You'll Ever Know" on the album Bad for You Baby by Gary Moore
- In 1973, "I Love You More Than You'll Ever Know" on the album Extension of a Man by Donny Hathaway
- In 2007, "I Love You More Than You'll Ever Know" was recorded live in Paris in September 2007 by Amy Winehouse
