= Jim Fielder =

American bassist

Jim Fielder (born October 4, 1947 in Denton, Texas) is an American bassist, best known for his work as an original member of Blood, Sweat & Tears. Prior to the band's formation, he was also rhythm guitarist for Frank Zappa's band The Mothers of Invention.

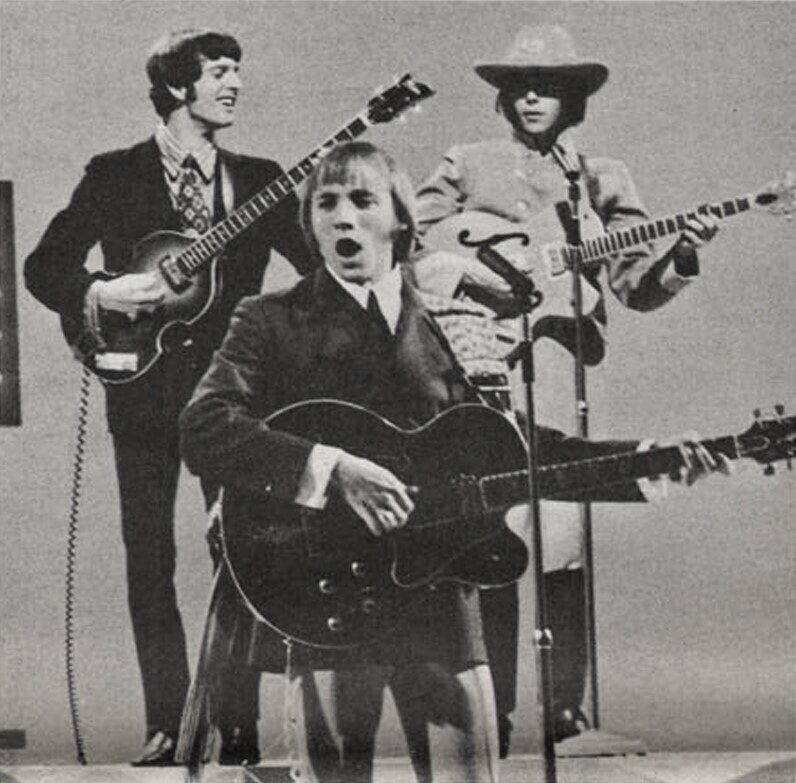
Fielder (back, left) with Buffalo Springfield in early 1967, filling in for the then-deported Bruce Palmer

Fielder attended Loara High School in Anaheim, California. While at Loara, the young Fielder befriended classmates Tim Buckley and Larry Beckett, a relationship that would launch Fielder into the music industry. As well as the Mothers, Fielder's pre-BS&T career included work with Buckley, and several other notable bands including Mastin & Brewer, with Mike Brewer and Billy Mundi, and Buffalo Springfield.

Since he departed from BS&T, Fielder has worked extensively in the music industry both studio and live performances, and for 40+ years was a standing member of Neil Sedaka's band.

== Discography ==
All albums are with Blood, Sweat & Tears unless otherwise noted.

- Tim Buckley (1966) - with Tim Buckley
- Absolutely Free (1967) – with The Mothers of Invention
- Buffalo Springfield Again (1967) – with Buffalo Springfield on "Everydays"
- Child Is Father to the Man (1968) – Blood, Sweat & Tears : RIAA Gold, #47
- Tell It Like It Is (A&M/CTI, 1969) – with George Benson
- Blood, Sweat & Tears (1968) – 1970 Grammy Award for Album of the Year, RIAA 4 x Multi-Platinum–, #1
- Blood, Sweat & Tears 3 (1970) – RIAA Gold, #1
- Blood, Sweat & Tears 4 (1971) – RIAA Gold, #10
- New Blood (1972) – #32
- No Sweat (1973) – #72
- What Goes Up! The Best of Blood, Sweat & Tears (1995)
