= Steve Katz (musician) =

American guitarist, singer and record producer (born 1945)

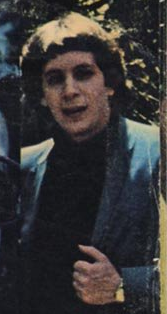
- Katz as part of the Blues Project in 1966

Background information
- Born: Steven Katz; May 9, 1945 (age 81); Brooklyn, New York, U.S.
- Occupations: Musician, record producer, songwriter, author, record company executive
- Instruments: Guitar, harmonica, vocals
- Website: stevekatzmusic.wordpress.com

Steven Katz (born May 9, 1945) is an American guitarist, singer, and record producer who is best known as a member of the rock-pop-jazz group Blood, Sweat & Tears. Katz was an original member of the rock bands the Blues Project and American Flyer. As a producer, his credits include the 1979 album Short Stories Tall Tales for the Irish band Horslips, and the Lou Reed albums Rock 'n' Roll Animal and Sally Can't Dance and the Elliott Murphy album Night Lights.

== Biography ==
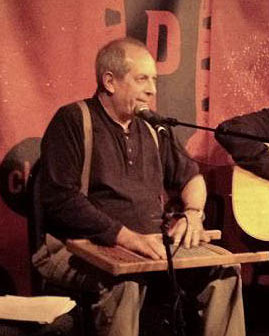
Steve Katz, c. 2010s

Katz was born in Brooklyn, New York City. His professional career started in the late fifties on a local Schenectady, New York television program called Teenage Barn. Accompanied by piano, he would sing such hits of the day as "Tammy" and "April Love". At 15, Katz studied guitar with Dave Van Ronk and Reverend Gary Davis. It was at this time that he met and befriended guitarist Stefan Grossman. They would sometimes act as road managers for Davis and, in so doing, met many of the great "rediscovered" blues men of an earlier era, such as Son House, Skip James and Mississippi John Hurt.

As a part of the Greenwich Village culture during this time, Katz, along with Grossman, Maria Muldaur, John Sebastian and David Grisman became interested in jug band music – the music of Cannon's Jug Stompers and the Memphis Jug Band. They and other friends formed the Even Dozen Jug Band and recorded an album in 1964 for Elektra Records. Katz played washboard in the band.

After a brief sabbatical in college, Katz, while teaching guitar in Greenwich Village, auditioned for the Danny Kalb Quartet as a two-week substitute for Artie Traum. Traum did not return to the group and when Al Kooper joined, the Blues Project was formed. They worked out of New York, and it was the mid-sixties, so the Blues Project experimented, dabbled in their own style and gave Katz an opportunity to showcase his own songs. The Blues Project recorded three albums while together in their first incarnation. "Steve's Song", on the Projections album was the first original song that Katz had recorded.

After two years as house band at the Cafe Au Go Go and Murray the K's last "submarine race-watching" spectacular at the RKO 58th Street theater in New York, the Blues Project broke up, playing the Monterey Pop Festival as their last major engagement.

== Blood, Sweat and Tears ==
After the demise of the Blues Project, Katz, Kooper, Bobby Colomby and Jim Fielder decided to work up a set of music – mainly of Kooper's new songs – for a benefit concert to raise money to send Kooper to London where he wanted to live. Joined by Fred Lipsius on alto sax, the concert raised "enough money for a cab to the airport". There was no choice but to start another band. Influenced by the Electric Flag and an album by the Buckinghams entitled Time and Charges, a horn section was utilized with rock arrangements that were a touch more sophisticated than most horn arrangements in rock up to that time. Thus, Blood, Sweat & Tears was formed, a Columbia Records contract obtained, and the album Child is Father to the Man released. Recorded and mixed in only two weeks, the album sold moderately well but was a critical success. Katz sang one original song ("Meagan's Gypsy Eyes") and "Morning Glory" by Tim Buckley.

Kooper left Blood, Sweat & Tears after only six months and while they were reorganizing, Katz wrote record reviews for Eye Magazine, a Cosmopolitan spin-off. Getting the record company to continue with the band without Kooper was difficult. Auditions were held and David Clayton-Thomas was hired as lead singer. Their next album sold six million copies worldwide and fostered three top 10 singles. Katz continued with Blood, Sweat & Tears for five years, during which time the group won three Grammy Awards, was voted best band by the Playboy Jazz and Pop Poll two years in a row, and won three major Down Beat awards. He wrote many songs during his tenure with the group.

== Record producer, label executive, author ==
In 1972, Katz met singer Lou Reed. After the commercial failure of Reed's album Berlin, Katz produced two albums: Sally Can't Dance and a live record Rock 'n' Roll Animal. After a number of productions during this period, including Night Lights by Elliott Murphy, Katz returned to playing music joining American Flyer with Eric Kaz, Craig Fuller of Pure Prairie League, and Doug Yule from the Velvet Underground. The first of their two albums was produced by George Martin.

In 1977, Katz became East Coast Director of A&R and later Vice President of Mercury Records. During the three years that he spent at Mercury he produced the Irish group Horslips and spent a good deal of time in Ireland producing three albums for the group. Horslips had originally been an acoustic band that sang their songs in Gaelic, and the band members made Katz aware of Irish traditional music. In 1987, Katz became managing director of Green Linnet Records, a leading record label of traditional Irish music in America. Katz stayed at Green Linnet for five years, during which time he married Alison Palmer, a ceramic artist. Together, they started a small business. He is a professional photographer.

Katz's memoir, Blood, Sweat, and My Rock 'n' Roll Years: Is Steve Katz a Rock Star? was published by Lyons Press in 2015.
