= Fred Lipsius =

American musician

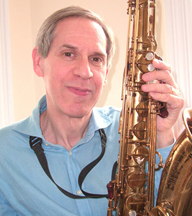

Background information
- Born: November 19, 1943 (age 82); The Bronx, New York, New York, US
- Genres: Jazz, rock
- Occupations: Musician, arranger, educator
- Instruments: Saxophone, piano
- Labels: ITI; MJA; Big Noise
- Formerly of: Blood, Sweat & Tears; Ronn Metcalfe Orchestra
- Awards: Grammy Awards – Fred Lipsius 1970 "Spinning Wheel" – Best Arrangement Accompanying Vocalist(s); Grammy Awards – Blood, Sweat & Tears 1970 Blood, Sweat & Tears – Album of the Year 1970 "Variations On A Theme By Eric Satie" – Best Contemporary Instrumental Performance

Fred Lipsius (born 19 November 1943) is an American musician who is the original saxophonist and arranger for the jazz-rock band Blood, Sweat & Tears, for which he played alto saxophone and piano. He was with the band from 1967 to 1971 and has collected 3 GRAMMY Awards and 9 Gold Records.

Before Blood, Sweat & Tears, Lipsius played with the Ronn Metcalfe Orchestra.

Lipsius has performed with Simon & Garfunkel, Janis Joplin, and jazz greats Cannonball Adderley, Thelonious Monk, Zoot Sims, Eddie Gómez, Al Foster, George Mraz, Larry Willis, Randy Brecker, and Rodney Jones. He has written music for and performed on over 30 CDs as both a leader and sideman. He has authored six books on jazz improvisation and jazz reading.

In 2020, Lipsius retired from Berklee College of Music in Boston, Massachusetts, USA after teaching full-time for 35 years.

In retirement, Lipsius has focused his efforts on his visual art. He has been creating digital pieces since 2000 and has had a number of public showings, some of which have been accompanied by his music.

Lipsius creates his pieces with Photoshop and other materials and has said of his art, "Producing this art has been nothing but fun and a big gift for me. My pieces are mostly improvised with little or no preconceived idea of what they should be. In viewing my art, please know that anything you can imagine already exists somewhere!”

Lipsius has recently listed some of his pieces as NFTs (non-fungible tokens) on OpenSea.

== Biography ==
Born in the Bronx, New York City, on November 19, 1943, Lipsius began playing the clarinet at age 9, alto and tenor saxophones in junior high school, and the piano at Music and Art High School in Manhattan. He continued his studies at Berklee School of Music (1961–62).

Lipsius was a saxophonist, arranger and conductor with Blood, Sweat & Tears from 1967 to 1971. He also doubled on keyboards. While with the band, he won nine Gold Records plus a Grammy Award for his arrangement of "Spinning Wheel". Lipsius also arranged and co-arranged, respectively, the hit singles "Hi-De-Ho" and "You've Made Me So Very Happy". In both the Down Beat and Playboy jazz polls he placed in the top ten of the alto sax category. Lipsius has composed, arranged and produced radio and TV commercials, including 2 CBS TV logos- themes introducing the season's upcoming shows. In the spring of 1982, he toured in Japan and Europe with Simon and Garfunkel.
