= And When I Die =

Single by Blood, Sweat & Tears

from the album Blood, Sweat & Tears
- B-side: "Sometimes in Winter"
- Released: 30 September 1969
- Recorded: 1968
- Genre: Jazz rock
- Length: 4:06 (Album version); 3:26 (Single version)
- Label: Columbia
- Songwriter: Laura Nyro
- Producer: James William Guercio

Blood, Sweat & Tears singles chronology
"Spinning Wheel" (1969)	"And When I Die" (1969)	"Smiling Phases" (1969)

"And When I Die" is a song written by American singer and songwriter Laura Nyro. It was first recorded by the folk group Peter, Paul and Mary in 1966. Nyro released her own version on her debut album More Than a New Discovery in February 1967.

The song is best known for the next version, recorded by the jazz-rock group Blood, Sweat & Tears in late 1969. This recording reached No. 2 on the US Billboard Hot 100 and became a Gold record. In the US, it was kept from #1 by the double A-side "Come Together"/"Something" by The Beatles. "And When I Die" was No. 1 in Canada for 2 weeks in December 1969 after 3 weeks at No. 2 also due to The Beatles.

== Lyrics ==
The song gives a positive outlook about death, stating, in the chorus, "And when I die / and when I'm gone / there'll be one child born, in this world / to carry on / to carry on."

== History ==
"And When I Die" was the first song written by then-17 year old Laura Nyro. She sold the song to folk group Peter, Paul and Mary for $5,000, who recorded it for their sixth studio album The Peter, Paul and Mary Album.

The song appeared on the self-titled second album by Blood, Sweat & Tears. It was the third single from the album, peaking at #2 on the Hot 100; the album's previous two singles had also stalled at #2 on the same chart. The three singles each charted thirteen weeks on the Hot 100.

The BS&T arrangement is very different from previous versions. It was also released as an album version and an edited single version. The album version features two instrumental portions, one featuring an RMI Electra Piano, and the other featuring horns and temple blocks, like a western cowboy song. Also, the pauses between the choruses and the other two verses are longer than on the edited version.

== Charts ==
Chart (1969)	Peak position
Australia Kent Music Report	4
Canada RPM Top Singles	1
Canada RPM Adult Contemporary	1
New Zealand (Listener)	1
US Billboard Hot 100	2
US Billboard Easy Listening	4

== Year-end Charts ==
Chart (1969)	Position
Canada Top Singles (RPM)	4

== Other versions ==
- The song was also recorded by The Heavy. This version was used in the season four finale of True Blood.
- The song was also played by Joe 90 in the closing credits of the horror movie Final Destination (2000).
- Billy Childs and Alison Krauss contributed a version of the song for Childs's 2014 album Map to the Treasure: Reimagining Laura Nyro. Childs and Krauss received nominations for the Grammy Award for Best American Roots Performance for their version.
- UK punk band Amebix covered the song on their 1985 album Arise released on Alternative Tentacles records on the song The Darkest Hour
