= Bobby Colomby =

American drummer

- Born: Robert Wayne Colomby; December 20, 1944 (age 81); Manhattan, New York, U.S.
- Occupations: Drummer, producer, and presenter
- Instrument: Drums
- Years active: 1967–present

Robert Wayne Colomby (born December 20, 1944) is a jazz-fusion drummer, record producer and television presenter. He is best known as an original member of the group Blood, Sweat & Tears, which he co-founded in 1967. He has also played with many other musical artists.

== Early life and family ==
Colomby was born in Manhattan, New York City. He graduated from City College of New York with a degree in psychology. He is a self-taught musician. His elder brother, Harry Colomby, was the manager of jazz musician Thelonious Monk.

== Career ==
Early in his career Colomby played drums with folk musicians such as Odetta and Eric Andersen. Colomby then connected with Steve Katz and Al Kooper, former members of The Blues Project, soon after the breakup of that group. This led directly to the formation of Blood, Sweat & Tears in September 1967.

Colomby played on the first Blood, Sweat & Tears album, Child Is Father to the Man, which was released in 1968 and reached #47 on the US Billboard Pop Albums chart. The group's self-titled second album was an even bigger critical and commercial hit. It reached #1 on the same chart and featured 3 hit singles, And When I Die, You've Made Me So Very Happy and Spinning Wheel. The group appeared at the Woodstock festival in August 1969 while the album won a Grammy Award for Album of the Year in 1970.

He appeared as a performer on nine Blood, Sweat & Tears albums and was the last original member when he stopped playing with the group in 1976. Along with Roy Halee he co-produced the group's 1977 album Brand New Day. After many changes in the group membership he became (in the end) the de facto owner of the Blood Sweat & Tears name. Colomby maintains ownership of the "Blood, Sweat & Tears" band name and, although he no longer plays with the band, he still oversees their musical direction.

Colomby is the uncredited drummer on the John Cale and Terry Riley collaboration album Church of Anthrax, which was released in February 1971.

He produced the debut solo album by jazz bass virtuoso Jaco Pastorius in 1976 and The Jacksons' comeback album Destiny in 1978.

In between, he played drums and percussion on Eddie Palmieri's Grammy nominated album Lucumi, Macumba & Voodoo in 1978.

For a few years in the 1980s, Colomby served as a reporter for the television programs Entertainment Tonight and CBS This Morning. He also hosted In Person from the Palace.

In 2000 Colomby and Richard Marx created Signal 21 Records. The label released only one album, Richard Marx's Days in Avalon, before folding shortly thereafter.

In 2002 Colomby began producing a series of albums for trumpeter Chris Botti, including, December, When I Fall in Love, To Love Again, Italia and Impressions and the DVDs Chris Botti Live with Special Guests and Chris Botti in Boston.

He has also produced Paula Cole (Courage), Jeff Lorber (He Had a Hat) and Leo Amuedo (Guitar Stories) and Herb Alpert (No Time For Time)

== Personal life ==
Colomby is married to Donna Abbott, a graphic designer and native of California.
