= Shades of Blue (disambiguation) =

Shades of blue are the colours considered to be similar to the most typical blues.

Shades of Blue may also refer to:

== Music ==
- Shades of Blue, a 1960s Irish rock band featuring future Thin Lizzy guitarist Eric Bell
- The Shades of Blue, an American vocal group
- Shades of Blue (Ben E. King album) (1993)
- Shades of Blue (Madlib album) (2003)
- Shades of Blue, a 1980 album by Lou Rawls
- Shades of Blue, a 1964 album by the Rendell–Carr Quintet
- Shades of Blue, a 1991 EP by the The
- "Shades of Blue", a song by Chris Child, known as Kodomo, featured in Amplitude

== Other uses ==
- Shades of Blue (TV series), a 2016 American police drama
- Shades of Blue, a 1999–2002 comic book and recipient of the 2000 Lulu Award

== See also ==
- "Shade of Blue", a 2003 song by Black Rebel Motorcycle Club from Take Them On, On Your Own
- Shade of Blue, a band from Iowa City, Iowa
