= Just We Two (Blinky and Edwin Starr album) =

Studio album by Blinky and Edwin Starr
- Released: September 16, 1969
- Recorded: 1969
- Genre: Soul music
- Length: 31:13
- Language: English
- Label: Gordy
- Producer: Frank Wilson

Blinky chronology
Just We Two (1969)	Heart Full of Soul: The Motown Anthology (2019)

Edwin Starr chronology
25 Miles (1969)	Just We Two (1969)	War & Peace (1970)

Singles from Just We Two
- 1. "Oh How Happy" Released: July 20, 1969

Just We Two is a 1969 album pairing soul music singers Blinky and Edwin Star, released on Gordy Records.

== Recording and release ==
Edwin Star had achieved a modest success with "Twenty-Five Miles" earlier in 1969 and Motown rushed to pair him with Blinky, a vocalist who had only released the 1968 single "(I Wouldn't Change) The Man He Is", which had received positive critical success, but limited sales. The label sought to replicate the success of Marvin Gaye and Tammi Terrell's duets, as well as compete with Stax Records' singles, but once this album was released, "Oh How Happy"/"Ooo Baby Baby" did not live up to the hype it received in Billboard, entering the Hot 100 at 99 and peaking at 96 the next week before disappearing from the charts. The album received little support from Motown and its commercial failure led to three further Blinky albums being canceled. Starr returned to being a solo act, scoring his biggest hit with "War" the following year. Blinky became a backing vocalist and would not receive another album until the 2019 compilation Heart Full of Soul: The Motown Anthology.

The album was re-released by Hip-O Select in 2004 on compact disc.

== Critical reception ==
Professional ratings
Review scores
Source	Rating
AllMusic	4/5 stars

Lindsay Planer of AllMusic gave this album a 3.5 out of five stars rating. Planer noted "After establishing himself with the Top Ten soul and pop hit "25 Miles," Edwin Starr teamed up with another burgeoning talent named Blinky (a.k.a. Sandra Williams) for a one-off album of duets. The lucrative pairing of vocalists had become something of a hallmark for musicians under the Motown umbrella. While the results may not be on par with that of Marvin Gaye's consistently remarkable work with the likes of Mary Wells, Kim Weston, and Tammi Terrell, a sufficient number of excellent cuts can be heard on 1969's Just We Two."

== Track listing ==
1. "You've Made Me So Very Happy" (Berry Gordy, Jr., Brenda Holloway, Patrice Holloway, and Frank Wilson) – 3:22
2. "I'm So Thankful" (Marc Gordon and Wilson) – 3:20
3. "Oh How Happy" (Charles Hatcher) – 2:48
4. "Let It Be Me" (Gilbert Bécaud, Manny Curtis, and Pierre Delanoë) – 3:19
5. "I'm Glad You Belong to Me" (Carl Christiansen, Cornelius Grant, Richard Morris, and Rodger Penzabene) – 3:09
6. "I'll Understand" (Isaac Hayes and David Porter) – 2:19
7. "We'll Find a Way" (Ivory Joe Hunter and Beatrice Verdi) – 2:48
8. "Sweet Joy of Life" (Debbie Dean and Dennis Lussier) – 2:23
9. "Can't We Be Strangers Again" (Helen Lewis and Kay Lewis) – 2:36
10. "I See a Rainbow" (H. Lewis and K. Lewis) – 2:29
11. "Ooo Baby Baby" (Warren "Pete" Moore and William Robinson) – 2:40

== Personnel ==
- Blinky – vocals
- Edwin Starr – vocals

Additional personnel

- Jerry Dempnock – photography
- The Funk Brothers – instrumentation
  - James Jamerson – bass guitar
- Ken Kim – design
- Curtis McNair – art direction
- Frank Wilson – production

Hip-O re-release

- Mathieu Bitton – design
- Suha Gur – mastering at Universal Mastering Studios-East
- Michele Horie – art direction, production management
- Pat Lawrence – executive production
- Lily Salinas – master tape research
- Harry Weinger – reissue production
- Heather Whitten – product management

== See also ==
- List of 1969 albums
