= Found Treasures =

Compilation album by Blood Sweat & Tears
- Released: February 12, 1990
- Recorded: 1967–1976
- Genre: Rock
- Length: 37:46
- Label: CBS/Columbia Records A16651
- Producers: Don Heckman, Bobby Colomby, Roy Halee, Bob James, James William Guercio, John Simon, Henry Cosby

Professional ratings
Review scores
Source	Rating
AllMusic	3.5/5 stars

Found Treasures is a budget compilation album by the band Blood, Sweat & Tears released by CBS/Columbia Records/Sony Music in 1990. The songs here were recorded from 1967 to 1976 while the band was signed to Columbia Records. This collection includes album tracks along with several single edits as they were heard on the radio. The single edits included here were not readily available on other albums and compilations at the time of this release.

== Track listing ==
1. "Go Down Gamblin'" (David Clayton-Thomas) – 4:12
2. "You're the One" (David Clayton-Thomas, William Daniel Smith) – 4:54
3. "For My Lady" (Steve Katz) – 3:23
4. "Spinning Wheel" (David Clayton-Thomas) – 3:27
5. "Without Her" (Harry Nilsson) – 2:39
6. "Sometimes in Winter" (Steve Katz) – 3:07
7. "Love Looks Good on You (You're Candy Sweet)" (Sharon Brown, Patricia Cosby) – 3:17
8. "God Bless the Child" (Billie Holiday, Arthur Herzog Jr.) – 5:54
9. "And When I Die" (Laura Nyro) – 3:25
10. "You've Made Me So Very Happy" (Berry Gordy Jr., Brenda Holloway, Patrice Holloway, Frank Wilson) – 3:28

== Production ==
- "Go Down Gamblin' " and "For My Lady"

Produced by Don Heckman, Bobby Colomby and Roy Halee
From the Columbia album Blood, Sweat & Tears 4 KC 30590 (1971)

- "You're the One"

Produced by Bob James
From the Columbia album More Than Ever PC 34233 (1976)

- "Spinning Wheel", "Sometimes in Winter", "God Bless The Child", "And When I Die", and "You've Made Me So Very Happy"

Produced by James William Guercio
From the Columbia album Blood, Sweat & Tears CS 9720 (1968)

- "Without Her"

Produced by John Simon
From the Columbia album Child Is Father to the Man CS 9619 (1968)

- "Love Looks Good on You (You're Candy Sweet)"

Produced by Henry Cosby
From the Columbia album Mirror Image KC 32929 (1974)
