= McQuay =

McQuay is a surname. Notable people with the surname include:

- Herb McQuay (1948–2005), American singer
- Kevin McQuay (1949–2005), Australian businessman
- Leon McQuay (1950–1995), American football player
- Leon McQuay III (born 1994), American football player
- Mike McQuay (1949–1995), American science fiction writer
- Stan McQuay (born 1973), American bodybuilder
- Tony McQuay (born 1990), American sprinter and silver medalist at the 2012 Olympic Games

== See also ==
- McQuay International, an HVAC manufacturing company
- McQuay-Norris, a defunct auto parts manufacturer and supplier
