= Oh How Happy =

1966 song by Edwin Starr

Single by The Shades of Blue
- B-side: "Little Orphan Boy"
- Released: April 1966
- Recorded: Fall 1965
- Genre: Soul
- Label: Impact 1007
- Songwriter: Edwin Starr
- Producer: John Rhys

The Shades of Blue singles chronology
"Oh How Happy" (1966)	"Lonely Summer" (1966)

“Oh How Happy” is a song written by Edwin Starr. It was a hit for the group The Shades of Blue. In the early 1980s, it was a minor hit for New Zealand based New York City soul singer Herb McQuay. Many artists have covered the song.

== Background ==
"Oh How Happy" was first recorded by The Shades of Blue. While the band was at Golden World recording background vocals and some demos, Edwin Starr - who happened to be there and liked their sound - approached them with an unfinished song of his. He sat down with the group to work out the chorus and wording. According to member Nick Marinelli, the band actually had an active role in the final product, but they were not credited. Starr cited Shades of Blue's youth and inexperience for not knowing how the assigning of credit worked. The song was recorded in the late fall of 1965 and the group took the record to Harry Balk at Impact Records, who signed them into a contract.

== Chart performance ==
The record was released in March 1966 and in no time went straight to No. 1 in the locals. Nationally it got to No. 12 in the pop charts and No. 7 in the R&B charts.

== Other versions ==
- Blinky and Edwin Starr, on the Gordy label in 1969, featured on Just We Two. For the week ending August 23, 1969, in the Billboard Hot 100, the song had climbed from 99 where it was the previous week to 92.

"Oh How Happy"

Single by Blinky & Edwin Starr

from the album Just We Two
- B-side: "Ooo Baby Baby"
- Released: July 20, 1969
- Genre: Soul
- Length: 2:39
- Label: Gordy 7090
- Songwriter: Edwin Starr
- Producers: Frank Wilson, B.J.

Blinky & Edwin Starr singles chronology
"I'm Still a Struggling Man" (1969)	"Oh How Happy" (1969)	"Time" (1970)

- Herb McQuay, on the Ode label in 1980.

"Oh How Happy"

Single by Herb McQuay
- B-side: "Mrs Jones"
- Released: 1980
- Genre: Soul
- Label: Ode ODE 711
- Songwriter: Edwin Starr

Herb McQuay singles chronology
"Fever Part 1"	"Oh How Happy"	"We'll Never Cry Alone"

- A take by Percy Sledge appears as the B side of his 1967 Atlantic single, "It Tears Me Up".
- The Jackson Five, with Jermaine Jackson on lead, recorded the song for their third album, 1970's aptly-named Third Album.
- The Skyliners, in 1978, reached No. 96 on the U.S. Cash Box Top 100.
- Carlene Carter did a duet with British rocker Paul Carrack on her album Blue Nun.
- The song has since been adapted for gospel music. It appears on the Voices of Heaven album by The Sparrow Singers.
- Cliff Richard, Marilyn McCoo and Billy Davis Jr. recorded it for Richard's 2011 album Soulicious.
