= You've Made Me So Very Happy =

1967 single by Brenda Holloway

Single by Brenda Holloway

from the album The Artistry of Brenda Holloway
- B-side: "I've Got to Find It"
- Released: August 17, 1967
- Recorded: July 21, 1967
- Studio: Hitsville West Studios, Los Angeles
- Genre: Soul
- Length: 2:54 (7" version); 2:52 ("16 Big Hits" stereo mix)
- Label: Tamla
- Songwriters: Berry Gordy Jr.; Brenda Holloway; Patrice Holloway; Frank Wilson
- Producers: Frank Wilson; Berry Gordy Jr.

Brenda Holloway singles chronology
"Just Look What You've Done" (1967)	"You've Made Me So Very Happy" (1967)	"Give Me a Little Inspiration" (1988)

"You've Made Me So Very Happy"

Single by Blood, Sweat & Tears

from the album Blood, Sweat & Tears
- B-side: "Blues – Part II"
- Released: March 1969
- Recorded: October 16, 1968
- Genre: Jazz rock, soft rock
- Length: 4:19 (LP Version); 3:26 (Single Version)
- Label: Columbia
- Songwriters: Berry Gordy Jr., Brenda Holloway, Patrice Holloway, Frank Wilson
- Producer: James William Guercio

Blood, Sweat & Tears singles chronology
"I Can't Quit Her" (1968)	"You've Made Me So Very Happy" (1969)	"Spinning Wheel" (1969)

"You've Made Me So Very Happy" is a song written by Brenda Holloway, Patrice Holloway, Frank Wilson and Berry Gordy, and was released first as a single in 1967 by Brenda Holloway on the Tamla label. The song was later a huge hit for jazz-rock band Blood, Sweat & Tears in 1969, and became a Gold record.

== Overview ==
=== Brenda Holloway version ===
Brenda Holloway had been recording for Motown Records since 1964, and by 1967 had struggled with the label over control of and support for her music. As she was a Los Angeles resident, with much of the rest of the Motown roster living near the label's Detroit, MI headquarters Holloway felt overlooked and neglected during her five years on the label. In 1967, Holloway was hoping for the release of her long-awaited second album, Hurtin' & Cryin, with her latest single, "Just Look What You've Done," intended as the first single. For unknown reasons, the record was shelved.

"You've Made Me So Very Happy, " which became Holloway's final single on Motown's Tamla label, was co-written by Holloway with her sister, Patrice, producer Frank Wilson, and Motown label head Berry Gordy. Despite its optimism, the impetus for the song was a breakup Holloway was going through at the time. Holloway and Gordy argued over the song's arrangement during the recording process, a fight Holloway lost, and the confrontation underscored her decision to depart from the label afterward.

Reaction to the song was stronger than Holloway's previous offerings, rising to number 39 on the Billboard Hot 100 and becoming her third Top-40 pop single. It peaked at number 40 on the Billboard R&B singles chart. Shortly after its release, Holloway left Motown and the song was eventually featured on her "second" album, The Artistry of Brenda Holloway. After two years singing backgrounds for acts such as Joe Cocker, Holloway retired to marry a preacher and raise a family. By the mid-1990s, she had returned to music full-time.

=== Blood, Sweat & Tears version ===
Brenda Holloway's "You've Made Me So Very Happy" received a boost when the jazz-rock group Blood, Sweat & Tears recorded a new arrangement in 1969. Included on the group's eponymous second album, it became one of Blood, Sweat & Tears' biggest hits, reaching number 2 on the Billboard Hot 100 in the United States in April 1969. The song was kept from the number 1 spot by "Aquarius/Let the Sunshine In" by The 5th Dimension. Outside the US, "You've Made Me So Very Happy" went to number 35 in the United Kingdom in May 1969. In Canada it was number 1 for 2 weeks and was in the top 10 for 8 weeks.

=== Other versions ===
- The song was recorded by Motown acts such as Edwin Starr and Blinky on their 1969 duet album Just We Two, Chris Clark on her 1969 album CC Rides Again, The Temptations in 1970, The Miracles, also in 1970, and Diana Ross in 1994 on a Berry Gordy tribute album.
- Bobbie Gentry, on her 1969 album Touch 'Em with Love.
- Cher, in 1969, for her album 3614 Jackson Highway, but the take was left off the final track list.
- Liza Minnelli live on The Ed Sullivan Show, May 18, 1969
- Lou Rawls recorded it and named his 18th album, You've Made Me So Very Happy (1970) after it.
- Sammy Davis Jr., for his 1970 album, Something for Everyone.
- Honey Cone, for their debut-album Take Me with You released in 1970.
- Matt Monro, on his 1970 album We're Gonna Change the World.
- Little-known Motown act The Hearts of Stone recorded a version for their 1970 album Stop the World - We Wanna Get On.
- Alton Ellis cut two reggae versions in 1970, one for Treasure Isle and one for Studio One, both in Jamaica.
- Mina, on her 1972 live album Dalla Bussola.
- Shirley Bassey, on her 1976 album Love, Life and Feelings.
- In 1977, Barry Williams performed the song on an episode of The Brady Bunch Variety Hour (1976–1977).
- In 1994 it was sung by pop musician Gloria Estefan; she included the song on her album Hold Me, Thrill Me, Kiss Me, which was a collection of songs that inspired her musical career.
- In 2012, Julian Ovenden put it on his debut album If You Stay.

== Chart history ==
=== Brenda Holloway version ===
Chart (1967)	Peak position
Canada Top Singles (RPM)	48
US Billboard Hot 100	39
US Hot R&B/Hip-Hop Songs (Billboard)	40

=== Blood, Sweat & Tears version ===
Chart (1969)	Peak position
Canada RPM Top 100 (#1 2wks)	1
US Billboard Hot 100	2
US Billboard Easy Listening	18
UK Singles Chart	35

== Personnel ==
=== Brenda Holloway version ===
- Lead vocals by Brenda Holloway
- Background vocals by assorted vocalists
- Instrumentation by bass: Carol Kaye, other unknown Los Angeles musicians
- Produced by Frank Wilson and Berry Gordy Jr.

=== Blood, Sweat & Tears version ===
- Lead vocals by David Clayton-Thomas
- Instrumentation by Blood, Sweat & Tears (including)
  - Fred Lipsius – alto saxophone, piano
  - Lew Soloff – trumpet, flugelhorn
  - Chuck Winfield – trumpet, flugelhorn
  - Jerry Hyman – trombone, recorder
  - Dick Halligan – organ, piano, flute, trombone
  - Steve Katz – guitar, harmonica
  - Jim Fielder – bass
  - Bobby Colomby – drums, percussion
- Produced by James William Guercio
