= The Come Back, All is Forgiven Tour: Live =

Video by Steve Harley & Cockney Rebel
- Released: 13 October 1989
- Recorded: 1989
- Genre: Concert Performance Video
- Length: 75 minutes
- Label: Odyssey
- Director: Steve Hills
- Producer: Vance Goodwin

Steve Harley & Cockney Rebel chronology
Live from London (1985)	The Come Back, All is Forgiven Tour: Live (1989)	Live at the Isle of Wight Festival (2005)

The Come Back, All is Forgiven Tour: Live is a live concert video by the British rock band Steve Harley & Cockney Rebel, which was filmed during their 1989 tour. The concert video has also been released in a variety of guises as a live album.

== Background ==
Steve Harley & Cockney Rebel's 1989 "The Come Back, All is Forgiven" tour was the band's first since their 1981 Christmas tour, and their first concert since a one-off show in London in 1984. In 1988, Harley made the decision to go back out on the road with a new line-up of Cockney Rebel. In January 1989, he entered the studio with guitarist Jim Cregan, keyboardist Duncan Mackay and drummer Stuart Elliott to record four new tracks, including "When I'm with You", which Harley hoped would generate record company interest and gain the band a record deal. With Cregan and Elliott joining a new touring line-up of Cockney Rebel, a short UK tour took place in March 1989. Speaking of the tour's name, Harley told the Newcastle Journal in 1989, "That's me being ironic. It stops anyone in your profession calling it a comeback tour or anything derogatory like that."

Following the UK tour, the band returned with a larger 64-date tour under the same name, which covered both the UK and Europe. Cregan was due to tour with the band, but he pulled out at the last minute and Rick Driscoll, who had also previously played guitar in Cockney Rebel, took his place. Two of the concerts on the tour, at the Dome Theatre in Brighton (17 June) and the Derngate Theatre in Northampton (28 June), were professionally filmed to produce a concert video. The Come Back, All is Forgiven Tour: Live was released by Odyssey on VHS in October 1989. Featuring fourteen songs of Harley's own personal choice from the two concerts, it was directed by Steve Hills, produced by Vance Goodwin, and produced by G & H Production Partnership in association with Steve Mather for JSE and Adrian Munsey for Odyssey Video. The tour was deemed a success, and the band, under different line-up changes, have continued to tour since.

On the back cover of the VHS, Harley was quoted: "So, how long has it been? Six, perhaps seven years since the last British tour? It's been far too long, of that I am certain. And there's no good reason for it, really. You know how much I love it up there. Quite honestly, there is nowhere I'd rather be. When you sing with me the choruses (often the entire lyrics!) of "Make Me Smile", the smile is genuine. The thanks are from deep inside; the joy is unequalled. To you, without whom... thanks."

== Release ==
The Come Back, All is Forgiven Tour: Live was originally released on VHS on 13 October 1989 by Odyssey. On 20 February 2012, Odyssey gave the video its first DVD release, released under the title Steve Harley + Cockney Rebel - Live.

=== CD version ===
The audio of the video has been released as a CD album under many guises across Europe and beyond. These albums have been released by a number of different 'super-cheapo' labels. The majority of versions of the album omitted the opening track "Dancing on the Telephone", while others placed "Make Me Smile (Come Up and See Me)" as the first track.

Title	Year	Country	Label
Live and Unleashed!	1990	UK	Tring International PLC (also on cassette)
Live: Make Me Smile	1992	Netherlands	Point Productions (as part of the Concert Collection series)
Live in the UK	1993	UK & Europe	Realisation Records
Star for a Week	1993	Germany	Pilz
The Best Years Of Your Life (Live)	1993	UK	Going for a Song/Cedar
Sebastian	1994	Germany	Legend Records
In Concert	1994	Europe	Digimode
Live in Concert	1994	Australia	Tempo Communications Pty Ltd
The Lighthouse	1994	Europe	Cosmus
Make Me Smile - Live on Tour	1994	UK	Music De Luxe
The Great Steve Harley & Cockney Rebel	1995	Europe	Goldies
Greatest Hits	1996	Europe	Merlin
Experience	1996	Europe	Experience
Legend of Rock	1996	Greece	Free supplement with the Greek newspaper "Free Press"
Gold	1996	Netherlands	Gold
Greatest Hits - Live in Concert	2004	Europe	Eurotrend
The Magic Collection	Unknown	Netherlands	Arc Records/Telesonic

== Critical reception ==
Professional ratings
Review scores
Source	Rating
AllMusic	1.5/5 stars

Upon its release, Jodie Wainwright of the Wakefield Express felt the video was "destined to become a classic" as the band's hits and "much, much more" are "relived in glorious technicolour". She concluded, "So Steve Harley is a little fatter, a little balder. He can still pack a punch, along with his paunch." Robin Duke of the West Lancashire Evening Gazette considered Cockney Rebel's return to be "one of the least likeliest comebacks of this year", with Harley now "look[ing] and sound[ing] like one of rock's older statesmen even though his band look and sound eminently contemporary". He picked "Sebastian" as one of the highlights and concluded, "Never one to show much enthusiasm about the traditions of the rock world, does Harley actually mean what he is doing this time around or is this simply a money spinner? It would be a shame if it was the latter."

In an AllMusic review of the 1994 Make Me Smile - Live on Tour CD release of the concert, Dave Thompson picked "The Lighthouse" and "Star for a Week" as two highlights from the show and noted they "work far more effectively live than they did in the studio" [on 1992's Yes You Can]. He felt the older material "offer[s] only isolated sparks of interest and innovation - ten minutes of 'Sebastian' impress with their portentousness, and the medley of 'The Best Years of Our Lives'/'Sweet Dreams' is perverse enough to demand a second listen. The problem is, this is meant to be a Steve Harley album. The audience often sings louder than he does."

== Track listing ==
No.	Title	Writer(s)	Length
1.	"Intro/Dancing on the Telephone"	Steve Harley, Jim Cregan, Stuart Elliott	4:51
2.	"Mr. Soft"	Harley	3:25
3.	"Mr. Raffles (Man, It Was Mean)"	Harley	5:14
4.	"When I'm with You"	Harley, Cregan, Elliott	4:01
5.	"Star for a Week"	Harley	5:25
6.	"Riding the Waves (for Virginia Woolf)"	Harley	6:13
7.	"The Lighthouse"	Harley	7:00
8.	"The Best Years of Our Lives"	Harley	5:32
9.	"Sweet Dreams"	Harley	1:46
10.	"Psychomodo"	Harley	4:06
11.	"Sling It!"	Harley	2:49
12.	"Sebastian"	Harley	10:07
13.	"Make Me Smile (Come Up and See Me)"	Harley	6:27
14.	"Love's a Prima Donna/Closing Credits"	Harley	7:01

== Personnel ==
Steve Harley + Cockney Rebel

- Steve Harley – lead vocals, guitar
- Rick Driscoll – lead guitar, backing vocals
- Barry Wickens – electric violin, guitar, backing vocals
- Ian Nice – keyboards
- Kevin Powell – bass guitar, backing vocals
- Stuart Elliott – drums

Concert crew

- Roy Wood – sound engineer
- Mick Gibbs – sound recording
- Steve Harley – sound mix
- Steve Hills – sound mix
- Scott Thompson – monitor engineer
- Dave Thomas – backline technician
- Clive Davies – lighting designer
- Leanne Bogen – graphics

Video production team

- Steve Harley – track selection, sound mix supervision, digital remix supervision
- Steve Hills – director
- Vance Goodwin – producer
- G & H Production Partnership – producer
- Steve Mather for JSE – production associate
- Adrian Munsey for Odyssey Video – production associate
- Stuart Shepherd – VT editor
- Odyssey Video – studio
- Virgin Distribution for Odyssey Video – distributor
- Shoot That Tiger! – design
- Linda Chapman – cover photo
- Steve Mather, JSE (London) – representation
- Skycom TV – facilities
