= Contact (Edwin Starr song) =

Single by Edwin Starr

from the album Clean
- B-side: "Don't Waste Your Time"
- Released: 1978
- Recorded: 1978
- Genre: Disco, soul
- Length: 3:35
- Label: 20th Century
- Songwriters: Robert Dickerson, Arthur Pullam, Edwin Starr
- Producer: Edwin Starr

Edwin Starr singles chronology
"I'm So into You" (1978)	"Contact" (1978)	"H.A.P.P.Y. Radio" (1979)

"Contact" is a 1978 disco single by Edwin Starr. The hook line is in the chorus, "Eye to eye, contact".

The single was number one on the disco chart for one week, early in 1979. It also crossed over to the Billboard Hot 100, becoming his highest charting pop single in seven years, peaking at number 65. "Contact" also made the Top 20 on the R&B Chart, peaking at number 13. The song found more success in the UK, where it was a Top Ten hit, peaking at number 6, in early 1979 (it would also earn Starr a silver disc for sales in excess of 250,000 copies, along with the first silver 12" award in recognition of sales over 100,000 copies). It proved to be his second best performance on the UK Singles Chart, beaten only by his number three success with "War" in 1970. His follow-up single, "H.A.P.P.Y. Radio", was also a UK hit, making it to number nine in mid-1979.

== Charts ==
Chart (1979)	Peak position
Australia (Kent Music Report)	37
Belgium (Ultratop 50 Flanders)	12
Canada (RPM Top 100)	58
Canada (RPM Disco 30)	1
Netherlands (Single Top 100)	18
Sweden (Sverigetopplistan)	20
United Kingdom (Official Charts Company)	9
United States (Billboard Hot 100)	65
