= Heartbeat Like Thunder =

1986 song by Steve Harley

Single by Steve Harley
- B-side: "Warm My Cold Heart"
- Released: 21 April 1986
- Genre: Pop
- Length: 5:47 (extended version); 3:51 (7-inch version)
- Label: RAK
- Songwriter(s): Steve Harley; Duncan Mackay
- Producer(s): Mickie Most

Steve Harley singles chronology
"The Phantom of the Opera" (1986)	"Heartbeat Like Thunder" (1986)	"Irresistible" (1986)

"Heartbeat Like Thunder" is a song by English singer-songwriter Steve Harley, released by RAK as a non-album single on 21 April 1986. The song was written by Harley and ex-Cockney Rebel keyboardist Duncan Mackay, and was produced by Mickie Most.

== Background ==
In 1985, Harley signed a three-album recording contract with Mickie Most's RAK and his debut single for the label, "Irresistible", entered the top 100 of the UK Singles Chart in June 1985. Towards the end of the year, Harley also became involved with Andrew Lloyd Webber's upcoming musical The Phantom of the Opera. He found himself back in the UK top 10 with the single "The Phantom of the Opera", a duet with Sarah Brightman, in February 1986. Harley soon found himself set to star as the Phantom in the upcoming musical.

Despite his new commitments to the musical, Harley continued working on his own solo material for RAK, including "Heartbeat Like Thunder", which he co-wrote with his former Cockney Rebel bandmate, keyboardist Duncan Mackay. Mackay stated in 2025, "Normally when I wrote with Steve I would come up with the melody and chords and then Steve would adapt this to his vocals." The song was recorded at RAK Studios with Mackay on keyboards and Big Country drummer Mark Brzezicki on drums. It was mastered at the Penthouse of Abbey Road Studios. Upon its completion, Most was particularly interested in releasing the song as a single, with Harley recalling in 2015, "Mickie loved the song and produced it with great sympathy, I think."

"Heartbeat Like Thunder" was released as single on 21 April 1986. Despite the recent success of "The Phantom of the Opera", "Heartbeat Like Thunder" failed to make an appearance in the top 100 of the UK Singles Chart and stalled at number 172. Regardless, Harley and Most continued to work together on Harley's upcoming solo album, El Gran Senor. The album was set for release in 1986, but after a remixed version of "Irresistible" was released later in 1986, RAK folded and the album was shelved. Some of the songs due to be released on the album appeared on Harley's 1992 album Yes You Can, but "Heartbeat Like Thunder" was not included.

== Release ==
"Heartbeat Like Thunder" was released by RAK Records on 7-inch and 12-inch vinyl in the UK only. The B-side, "Warm My Cold Heart", was written and produced by Harley. The track, which has remained exclusive to the single, was first introduced live during Steve Harley & Cockney Rebel's 1980 Christmas tour. For the 12-inch release, an extended version of "Heartbeat Like Thunder" was featured as the A-side. The single's sleeve features a photograph of Harley taken by Adrian Peacock.

Although "Heartbeat Like Thunder" was not released in Canada, it achieved airplay as an import on the Greater Toronto Area's CFNY-FM. It was listed as the station's "single add of the week" in May 1986 and was reported in July to be one of the station's top requested import songs.

Following its original release as a single, the song has not appeared on any Steve Harley compilations. In 1994, the extended remix version appeared on the Canadian various artists compilation Hardest Hits, Vol. 3, released on the SPG label. In 2003, the CD was included as part of a three disc set titled Hardest Hits.

== Critical reception ==
Upon its release, Lee Jacobs of the Bury Free Press gave the song a 3 out of 10 rating and wrote, "A 'nice' song from that 'nice' Mr Harley dear – you know the one? He used to have an edge to him." John Lee of the Huddersfield Daily Examiner described the song as an "agreeable medium-paced soft rocker" and concluded that although it was "nothing special", the "insistent off-beat melody could prove hit material". He added, "The Cockney Rebel has aged well, and his on-record performances are as capable and youthfully mellow as they were a decade or so ago." David Alpin of the Halifax Evening Courier remarked, "A bit lightweight, but then it's a lightweight time of year."

Gay Bolton of the Derbyshire Times stated, "I was weaned on a musical diet of Cockney Rebel in my teenage years so you can imagine how shocked I was to hear Steve's latest single. He seems to have shed his imaginative ideas for a safe ballad-like song that will probably get more airplay on Radio Two than John Peel's late night show on Radio One." Alison Peachey of the Northampton Chronicle and Echo considered it a "sadly disappointing offering" following Harley's previous single, the hit duet 'The Phantom of the Opera' with Sarah Brightman. She continued, "It's a competent yet uninspiring effort and will probably miss the top 40 altogether."

Speaking of Harley's work on the Phantom of the Opera musical and the release of "Heartbeat Like Thunder", Bill Hagerty commented in a 1986 issue of Sunday, "With the Phantom single already released and with a single of his own, 'Heartbeat Like Thunder', also out, everyone knows that Harley's back in business. There's also the stage production of the Phantom, due later this year, plus a recording deal with RAK Records. It's a truly remarkable re-emergence into the limelight by this 35-year-old son of a South London postman. But don't mention the comeback word to Steve Harley. It makes him mad." Andy Kellman of AllMusic retrospectively highlighted the song by mentioning it in a review of the Hardest Hits, Vol. 3 compilation.

== Track listing ==
7-inch single

1. "Heartbeat Like Thunder" – 3:51
2. "Warm My Cold Heart" – 3:28

12-inch single

1. "Heartbeat Like Thunder" (Extended Re-mix) – 5:47
2. "Warm My Cold Heart" – 3:28

== Personnel ==
- Steve Harley – vocals
- Duncan Mackay – keyboards
- Mark Brzezicki – drums

Production

- Mickie Most – production ("Heartbeat Like Thunder")
- Steve Harley – production ("Warm My Cold Heart")

Other

- Graham Marks – design
- Adrian Peacock – photography

== Charts ==
Chart (1986)	Peak position
UK Singles Chart	172
