= When I'm with You (Steve Harley song) =

1989 song by Steve Harley

Single by Steve Harley
- B-side: Theme From "Babbacombe Lee"
- Released: 1 June 1989
- Genre: Pop rock
- Length: 3:32
- Label: Vital Vinyl
- Songwriters: Steve Harley; Jim Cregan; Stuart Elliott
- Producers: Steve Harley; Jim Cregan; Stuart Elliott

Steve Harley singles chronology
"Whatever You Believe" (1988)	"When I'm with You" (1989)	""Make Me Smile (Come Up and See Me)" (re-issue)" (1992)

"When I'm with You" is a song by the English singer-songwriter Steve Harley, released by Vital Vinyl as a non-album single on 1 June 1989. It was written and produced by Harley, ex-Cockney Rebel guitarist Jim Cregan and drummer Stuart Elliott.

== Background ==
After a Christmas tour in 1981, and the odd show between 1983–84, Steve Harley & Cockney Rebel would not embark on a tour again until 1989's "The Come Back, All is Forgiven" tour. At the beginning of 1989, before the tour, Harley returned to the studio and recorded six tracks with Jim Cregan, Duncan Mackay and Stuart Elliott, all of whom were in the most successful reincarnation of Cockney Rebel from 1974-1977. The tracks recorded included "When I'm with You", "Dancing on the Telephone", "The Alibi" and "Limbs of Men". Harley hoped the new recordings would help the band gain a record deal.

The "Come Back, All is Forgiven" tour covered both the UK and Europe and as part of the tour's set-list, Harley added a selection of new songs, including "When I'm with You", "Dancing on the Telephone", "The Lighthouse", and the Traveling Wilburys' "Not Alone Anymore". To coincide with the main 64-date part of the tour, which commenced in June 1989, Harley released "When I'm with You" as a non-album single to promote the live shows. Harley told The Sentinel in 1989, "'When I'm with You' proved extremely popular when we played in London earlier this year." Although the single failed to chart, the tour was a success, and the band, under different line-up changes, continued to tour until Harley's death in 2024.

"When I'm with You" was Harley's first new solo single since 1986's "Irresistible". It would also be his last release of new material until his 1992 solo album Yes You Can. Both "Dancing on the Telephone" and "The Lighthouse" would later be recorded for Yes You Can, however the album did not include "When I'm with You".

The single's B-side is an instrumental track titled "Theme from 'Babbacombe Lee'", which was written by Harley, and produced by Harley and Steve Hills. It was noted on the vinyl that the track was from the forthcoming movie Babbacombe Lee. The film, based on the true story of John 'Babbacombe' Lee, who survived three attempts to hang him in Victorian times, was due to feature Harley as the leading character, but those involved with the project were never able to secure funding. Harley told Replay in 1993, "I don't think it will ever happen, even though it looked as though it could have been a monster hit on a small budget, but that's the British film industry for you. It was a wonderful script, but the film world is worse than the pop business, nothing ever happens." A different recording of the instrumental later appeared as a B-side to the 1992 European CD single "Irresistible", where it was renamed "The Waggon".

== Release ==
"When I'm with You" was released by Vital Records on 7" vinyl in the UK only. It was published by BMG Music and JSE Music Ltd., and distributed by Precision Records & Tapes Limited. The single featured a black-and-white sleeve, with the front cover highlighting a close-up photograph of Harley. The song has not appeared on any other release or compilation since. As a result, it has never had a digital release.

As the song was regularly performed at the band's concerts in 1989, a live version was recorded at the band's concert at Brighton. It was released in October 1989 on the VHS The Come Back, All is Forgiven Tour: Live. Following the release of the VHS, the same concert would later emerge as an audio album, which has been released across Europe under a number of different titles. Some of these titles, including the song, include 1993's Live in the UK and Star for a Week, 1996's Make Me Smile - Live on Tour, and 1997's Steve Harley & Cockney Rebel.

== Critical reception ==
In a review of Steve Harley & Cockney Rebel's 1989 concert at the Birmingham Hippodrome, Steve Warren of the Sandwell Evening Mail commented: ""When I'm with You" was greeted with generous applause, hinting that a major comeback can still be on the cards."

== Track listing ==
7-inch single (UK)

1. "When I'm with You" – 3:32
2. "Theme From "Babbacombe Lee"" – 3:24

== Personnel ==
- Steve Harley – vocals, producer
- Jim Cregan – guitar, producer
- Duncan Mackay – keyboards
- Stuart Elliott – drums, producer
- Steve Hills – producer of "Theme From "Babbacombe Lee"
