= Great British Ghosts =

- Poster for first series
- Genre: Factual
- Directed by: Bruce Burgess
- Presented by: Michaela Strachan
- Starring: Michaela Strachan
- Narrated by: Michaela Strachan
- Country of origin: United Kingdom
- Original language: English
- No. of series: 2
- No. of episodes: 21 (including Halloween special)

Production
- Executive producers: David Lawley; Emma Collin; Emma Sparks; Adrian Wills
- Production location: United Kingdom
- Editor: David Willis
- Camera setup: Matt Green
- Running time: 23 minutes
- Production company: Altamar Entertainment LTD

Original release
- Network: Yesterday
- Release: 18 August 2011 – 31 October 2012

Great British Ghosts is a paranormal series that recounts stories of reported ghost sightings from some of the "most haunted" locations in the United Kingdom. It is presented by Michaela Strachan and was first aired on 18 August 2011. The first series of eight episodes told the stories of alleged sightings and paranormal activity at specific locations. All the episodes were aired in one night. It aired on Yesterday, part of UKTV. A second series of Great British Ghosts premiered on 24 August 2012 on Yesterday with a double bill. There were 12 episodes in the second series. In October 2012 a Halloween special was also aired. The series was originally commissioned for Yesterday's now closed sister channel Blighty. Repeats of the show are broadcast on Drama.

== Episodes ==
=== Season 1 ===
No. overall	No. in season	Title
1	1	"The Old Church, Golborne Road, West London."
Firstly they visit the Mermaid Inn (now the Earl of Portobello) which was used by the 'Hawkhurst Gang' in the 17th century, and is said to be haunted by five different ghosts. Then they move on to The Old Church, now a thriving fashion design house, to learn about the hundreds of reported ghost sightings that have occurred there and to look around the building said to be the most haunted place in West London.
2	2	"The New Inn, Gloucester & Chavenage House, Tetbury"
In the first part of this episode Michaela visits the New Inn which dates back to the 14th century and is said to be one of the most haunted places in the area. The team try to find out if these claims are true. In the second part of this episode Michaela visits Gloucester and Chavenage House which dates back to the Elizabethan period and has many alleged hauntings including a headless horseman.
3	3	"Woodchester Mansion & Prestbury Village"
In the first part of the episode the GBG team visit Woodchester Mansion which was built by a freemason in the 19th century during which 7 deaths occurred. The Mansion is incomplete and is said to be cursed. In the second part of the episode the team visit Prestbury Village which is said to be the most haunted village in England, they are guided by Ross Andrews from the Podcast show "The Paranormal Tourists". There are said to be more ghosts per square foot than any other town, village or city in the world, the most famous ghost is a dark hooded monklike figure called, "The Black Abbot".
4	4	"The Red Lion Hotel & Kelvedon Hatch Nuclear Bunker"
In the first part of the episode Michaela visits the Red Lion Hotel which dates back to the 15th century and where it is claimed that three ghosts haunt the premises including a chambermaid. In the second part of the episode Michaela visits Kelvedon Hatch Nuclear bunker which was built in 1952 to house the UK government and 600 people in the event of a nuclear attack. It is supposed to be haunted by many ghosts including a black figure.
5	5	"The Galleries of Justice, Nottingham & the Viaduct Tavern, London"
In the first part of the episode Michaela visits the Galleries of Justice which have been used for over 230 years, hundreds of prisoners were executed here and it is claimed to be one of the most haunted places in Britain. In the second part of the episode Michaela visits the Viaduct Tavern which is one of the last examples of a Victorian gin palace in London. it was located next to two notorious prisons and is said to be extremely haunted.
6	6	"The Hellfire Caves, West Wycombe & the Ostrich Inn, Colnbrook, Bucks"
In the first part of this episode Michaela visits the Hellfire Caves which were built in the 18th century and housed the 'Hellfire Cave'. They are believed to have practiced Black Magic. In the second part of the episode Michaela visits the Ostrich Inn which dates back to the 1500s. The landlord in the medieval period is said to have murdered 60 people here and it is haunted.
7	7	"The Black Swan Hotel & a Ghost Tour of Devizes"
In the first part of the episode Michaela visits the Black Swan Hotel dating from the 18th century and said to have been owned by a highwayman who haunts the hotel. In the second part of the episode Michaela takes a ghost tour of Devizes to find out about the towns reported ghosts. They visit a Civil War graveyard where soldiers were buried upright and are said to grab people's legs.
8	8	"The Grenadier pub & the Haunted London Ghost Tour"
In the first part of the episode Michaela visits the Grenadier pub which in the past was used an officers' mess for the nearby army barracks. It is said to be haunted by an officer who saw his end in the cellar. In the second part of the episode Michaela raked the famous London Ghost Tour and hears the stories and sees the locations of London's ghostly secrets.

=== Season 2 ===
No. overall	No. in season	Title
9	1	"Berkeley Castle and the George and Pilgrims Hotel"
10	2	"The Cage, St. Osyth and the Old Courthouse Inn"
11	3	"The Lion and Swan Inn and Pendle Hill"
12	4	"St. Briavels Castle and the New Inn"
13	5	"The Grand Theatre and Blackpool Pleasure Beach"
14	6	"The Angel Hotel and Clearwell Caves"
15	7	"Derby Gaol and Guildhall Tunnels"
16	8	"Hall I' Th' Wood and Smithills Hall"
17	9	"The Ram Inn and the Ragged Cot Inn"
18	10	"The Four Crosses and West Bromwich Manor House"
19	11	"The Feathers Hotel and the Prince Rupert Hotel"
20	12	"The Sun Inn and Samlesbury Hall"
21	13	"Halloween Special from Carnfield Hall, Alfreton"
