= The Phantom of the Opera (song) =

Song composed by Andrew Lloyd Webber

"The Phantom of the Opera" is a song from the 1986 stage musical of the same name. It was composed by Andrew Lloyd Webber, with lyrics written by Charles Hart and Richard Stilgoe, and additional lyrics by Mike Batt. The song was originally recorded by Sarah Brightman and Steve Harley, which became a UK hit single in 1986, prior to the musical. In its theatrical debut, it was sung by Brightman and Michael Crawford in their roles as Christine Daaé and the Phantom.

== Background ==
The song is performed in Act I after the song "Angel of Music" (The Mirror) and before "The Music of the Night" (and is reprised in Act Two at the end of the song "Notes/Twisted Every Way"). It takes place as the Phantom escorts Christine by boat to his lair beneath the Opera Garnier. It is sung as a duet by Christine and the Phantom. In different shows, Sarah Brightman sings this song in different duets with other performers, Antonio Banderas, Chris Thompson, Alessandro Safina, Mario Frangoulis, Colm Wilkinson, Anthony Warlow, John Owen-Jones, Peter Jöback and Erkan Aki.

The song increases tension through successive key changes. At the end of the song, Christine sings her highest note in the show, an E_{6}.

== Composition ==
In 1984, Andrew Lloyd Webber and producer Cameron Mackintosh began working on the Phantom of the Opera musical, with Lloyd Webber's wife, Sarah Brightman, set to play the heroine Christine. Lloyd Webber composed the music of what became the title track and gave an early demo recording, minus lyrics and vocals, to Mike Batt. After Batt expressed interest in working on the track, Lloyd Webber recorded another demo of it, with Brightman providing a wordless guide vocal. Batt believed it would make a "great title song" and named it accordingly. He then wrote a set of lyrics and reworked the music, giving what he originally perceived as a "languid romantic ballad" a "more up-tempo treatment" and a "more vigorous rhythm". Batt recorded a rough piano and vocal version, which was warmly received by Lloyd Webber and Mackintosh. The lyrics were subsequently reworked and credited to Richard Stilgoe, with Batt receiving a credit for "additional lyrics". The final version of the song as it appeared in the musical featured a further writing credit to lyricist Charles Hart.

== Sarah Brightman and Steve Harley version ==
"The Phantom of the Opera"

Single by Sarah Brightman and Steve Harley

from the album The Phantom of the Opera
- B-side: "Overture – The Phantom of the Opera"
- Released: 3 January 1986
- Genre: Show tune; rock
- Length: 4:38
- Label: Polydor Records
- Songwriters: Andrew Lloyd Webber (music); Richard Stilgoe (lyrics); Mike Batt (additional lyrics)
- Producer: Mike Batt

Sarah Brightman singles chronology
"Pie Jesu" (1985)	"The Phantom of the Opera" (1986)	"All I Ask of You" (1986)

Steve Harley singles chronology
"Irresistible" (1985)	"The Phantom of the Opera" (1986)	"Heartbeat Like Thunder" (1986)

On 3 January 1986, the original recording of "The Phantom of the Opera" was released as a single to promote the upcoming musical of the same name. The duet was produced and arranged by Mike Batt and performed by Sarah Brightman and Steve Harley. The song peaked at number 7 in the UK Singles Chart and remained in the charts for ten weeks.

=== Background ===
As development of The Phantom of the Opera musical progressed in 1985, Lloyd Webber decided that releasing the title track as a pop single would be a good way of promoting the upcoming musical and "test[ing] the water" in terms of public reception. He stressed that he wanted the song to have a rock 'n' roll sound, to which Mike Batt, who was asked to produce the single, added an electro-pop beat, using a Fairlight CMI for the bass line, and rock guitars to "augment the feel". Lloyd Webber also wished to use a rock singer for the part of the Phantom on the track. Batt recommended Steve Harley, with whom he had worked with on the 1983 single "Ballerina (Prima Donna)".

Harley was currently working on his own solo album, El Gran Senor, for Mickie Most's label Rak, and, although he felt the Phantom project was "so different to me and my reputation and career moves up till then", he "jumped at the chance" to record the song. Harley successfully auditioned at Lloyd Webber's home, where he sang a couple of songs from the musical, including the title track, with piano backing from Lloyd Webber and Batt. Speaking to Number One in February 1986, he revealed, "I don't mean to boast but after only singing one verse he told me I'd got the job!" He added to the Daily Star at the time, "[Mike Batt] said he was going to tell Andrew that my voice was just right for the song. I thought he was joking. But I really enjoyed working with Andrew. I'd love to play the Phantom when he puts the show on stage."

The song was recorded three weeks later as a duet between Brightman and Harley. Speaking of the recording of the song, Harley admitted, "I felt a bit like a fish out of water. Sarah would record her part perfectly then leave, and I'd have to stay until I hit those notes. It really stretched me." In the 2006 documentary Behind the Mask, Harley recalled, "I'd never done a duet. I knew Sarah could sing with an angelic soprano. I was quite happy to give it a crack, as it were."

The single was released on 3 January 1986 and reached its peak of number 7 in the UK Singles Chart in early February. Following its success, Harley was the prime candidate for the role of the Phantom in the musical and, after he auditioned in front of the creative team, was given the role the following day. He then spent five months rehearsing under producer Hal Prince. As the style of singing was different to what he had done before and to train his voice to cope with the demands of the musical, Harley also took singing lessons. During this period, Harley recorded a number of other tracks from the musical, including "The Music of the Night" and "All I Ask of You". They were due to have been released on a proposed soundtrack album, but the recordings were ultimately shelved.

Days before the cast were due to be announced to the public, Harley was told that he was being replaced by Michael Crawford. He had anticipated prior to the decision that he would not be playing the Phantom after all as the direction of the musical had changed from when he first got involved. Harley told Club International in 1986, "The stage role was offered to me but I am not going to play it. I'm sure I'm not. I can't go into any details, but it looks as if that's the way the decision will go. It's getting quite operatic; that's the main reason and I don't think it's necessarily right for me." He told the Evening Times in July 1986, after the news had gone public, "Andrew had simply changed the show [from a rock musical] and was right – I was no longer the right person for the role." In Behind the Mask, Cameron Mackintosh recounted, "[Harley] wasn't that experienced as an actor. It became obvious to me, and then I discussed it with Hal and Andrew, who also came to the same conclusion that this was a lovely impulse but not the right decision for the show." It has been suggested that, due to suffering from polio as a child, there were also doubts as to whether Harley could effectively cope with the physical demands of the part. He received £20,000 compensation after he was removed from the musical.

=== Release ===
The single was released by Polydor Records on 7-inch and 12-inch vinyl in the UK, Europe, North America, Australasia and South Africa. In the UK, a limited-edition version of the 7-inch release was also issued featuring a luminous disc. The B-side, "Overture – The Phantom of the Opera", is a two-minute instrumental version of the A-side, written and produced by Andrew Lloyd Webber, and the 12-inch single features a seven-minute extended remix of the A-side. The graphic artwork and sleeve design for the single was created by Dewynters Ltd, London. On the back sleeve of the release, a short passage reads:

"Ladies and Gentlemen, On this recording I have required that Sarah Brightman and Steve Harley perform the theme from the forthcoming musical, which I have instructed Andrew Lloyd Webber to write around my legend 'The Phantom of the Opera.' Your Obedient Servant, The Phantom".

Brightman and Harley's version of the song would appear on the 1994 compilation album The Very Best of Andrew Lloyd Webber, as well as another Lloyd Webber compilation, Gold – The Definitive Hit Singles Collection, released in 2001.

=== Music video ===
A music video, directed by Ken Russell, was filmed to promote both the single and upcoming musical. It took four days to shoot and starts with Brightman as Christine running to her dressing room. On her way there, Raoul gives her a purple flower bouquet, which she takes with her. In her dressing room, she finds a gift box from the Phantom (portrayed by Harley). She opens it and puts the veil inside on her head. Then, she enters the mirror, arriving in the Phantom's lair, with the Phantom standing across the other side of a lake. Christine crosses the lake on a boat that moves by itself. The closing segment features Christine performing on stage in front of an audience including Raoul. The Phantom, secretly spectating, cuts a rope backstage which causes the chandelier to crash on top of Raoul. The video ends with Christine screaming before blood red drips over and envelops the screen. In his book Phallic Frenzy: Ken Russell and His Films, author Joseph Lanza felt the video "packs in the gist of the musical's message and story in just over four minutes."

In the Behind the Mask documentary, Richard Stilgoe described the video as "wonderful, as over-the-top as you can get" and Cameron Mackinstosh stated, "Ken Russell came up with the most brilliant, outrageous video. It's fantastic fun, and completely over-the-top, which of course Andrew and I loved." Speaking of his experience shooting the video, Harley told the Sandwell Evening Mail in 1986, "Every minute of it was torment. It was hellishly uncomfortable. I had red hot lights under my feet and my mask kept slipping off. It was like walking blindly over a bed of coals."

=== Critical reception ===
Upon its release, Malcolm Dome of Kerrang! called the track "strong Andrew Lloyd Webber stuff (orchestrally-orientated rock/pop)" and "interesting, even if the rock element isn't played up as much as I'd have liked". He added, "It's great to see Steve Harley back in action." Karen Swayne of Number One was negative in her review, stating that Brightman and Harley, now "older and wiser", had "taken to more boring adult pursuits" by singing on the track, with the results being "unlistenable". Andy Hurt of Sounds remarked, "Shucks – it's not so bad until Brightman does her Brunhilde bit at the end. All the windows in the street are blown out as my eardrums explode." Tamsin Fontes of the Mid Sussex Times remarked that "La Brightman warbles shrilly like a demented canary and ageing Cockney Rebel, Steve Harley, finds a new vocation as the lovesick phantom". The Middleton Guardian described the song as "opera meets rock" and "directionless hotch-potch with practically no pop appeal". In the US, Bob Sawyer of The Valley Advocate gave the single four out of five stars. He noted Brightman's "wonderful set of pipes" and added that although Harley was "not as operatic" as Brightman, "his voice does blend nicely with hers".

=== Track listing ===
7-inch single (UK, Europe, Canada, Australasia and South Africa)

1. "The Phantom of the Opera" – 4:40
2. "Overture – The Phantom of the Opera" – 2:10

7-inch Single (US)

1. "The Phantom of the Opera" – 4:40
2. "The Phantom of the Opera" (Instrumental) – 2:10

12-inch single (UK, Europe and Australasia)

1. "The Phantom of the Opera" (Extended Version) – 7:09
2. "The Phantom of the Opera" – 4:40
3. "Overture – The Phantom of the Opera" – 2:10

CD single (Japan, 1988)

1. "The Phantom of the Opera" – 4:44
2. "Overture – The Phantom of the Opera" – 2:13

=== Charts ===
Chart (1986)	Peak position
European Hot 100 Singles	39
Irish Singles Chart	11
UK Singles Chart (Official Charts Company)	7

== Nightwish cover ==
"The Phantom of the Opera"

Song by Nightwish

from the album Century Child
- Released: 25 May 2002 (album)
- Recorded: January–April 2002 (album)
- Studio: Caverock (Kitee); Finnvox (Helsinki)
- Genre: Symphonic metal; power metal
- Length: 4:09
- Label: Spinefarm
- Songwriters: Andrew Lloyd Webber (music); Richard Stilgoe (lyrics); Charles Hart (lyrics); Mike Batt (additional lyrics)
- Producers: Tuomas Holopainen; TeeCee Kinnunen

In 2002, the Finnish symphonic metal band Nightwish recorded a cover of "The Phantom of the Opera", with their then lead (female) singer Tarja Turunen singing Christine's parts and the bassist and second (male) voice Marko Hietala singing the Phantom's parts. The song was released as part of their album Century Child; a live version is found in their 2006 live album, End of an Era, where Turunen and Hietala duet again on the song. The live version of the song reached critical acclaim, with the performance between Turunen and Hietala often considered one of the highlights of the band's career, and has reached over 150 million combined views on YouTube.

In January 2023, the song was performed for the first time in 17 years during Nightwish's Human. :II: Nature. World Tour in Amsterdam, with Floor Jansen and Henk Poort as the vocalists. Jansen and Poort had already performed the song on the Dutch TV show Beste Zangers in 2019, to much critical acclaim.

2023 also marked the first official performance of the song between Turunen and Hietala in 18 years, where Hietala made a special appearance while Turunen was on her Living the Dream Tour in Pratteln. Later, it would continue to be performed by the two as a part of Turunen's Living the Dream Together tour with Hietala.

== Plagiarism allegations ==
In 1990, the songwriter Ray Repp sued Lloyd Webber, saying he had plagiarised the "Phantom of the Opera" melody from his 1978 song "Till You". Lloyd Webber denied this, saying he had taken parts from his own earlier work, "Close Every Door", and that both songs included elements of compositions by Bach, Grieg and Holst. The judge ruled in Lloyd Webber's favour in 1994.

In 1992, the former Pink Floyd songwriter Roger Waters asserted that Lloyd Webber had plagiarised "The Phantom of the Opera" from a sequence of the 1971 Pink Floyd song "Echoes". He said: "It's the same time signature – it's 12/8 – and it's the same structure and it's the same notes and it's the same everything. Bastard. It probably is actionable. It really is! But I think that life's too long to bother with suing Andrew fucking Lloyd Webber."
