= H.A.P.P.Y. Radio (song) =

Single by Edwin Starr

from the album H.A.P.P.Y. Radio
- B-side: "My Friend"
- Released: 1979
- Recorded: 1978
- Genre: Disco, soul
- Length: 3:28
- Label: 20th Century
- Songwriter: Edwin Starr
- Producer: Edwin Starr

Edwin Starr singles chronology
"Contact" (1978)	"H.A.P.P.Y. Radio" (1979)	"It's Called The Rock" (1979)

"H.A.P.P.Y. Radio" is a 1979 disco song recorded by soul singer Edwin Starr.

Starr's previous release, "Contact", had proved to be his best showing on the Billboard Hot 100 (and R&B Chart) in several years. It was also a hit in Britain, making it to number six on the UK Singles Chart. This song was issued as its follow-up, and although less successful, still made all three charts. "H.A.P.P.Y. Radio" peaked at number 79 on the Hot 100 and number 28 on the R&B Chart, but was a much bigger hit in the UK, where it was reached number nine in mid-1979. The song was both written and produced by Edwin Starr.

== Reception ==
Smash Hits said, "Edwin knows what his British fans want to hear better than most other Americans and it sounds as if he's got the formula right again with this boisterous chuck of disco-mix, which is like a cross between "Contact" and one of his earliest hits "Headline News"."

== Charts ==
Chart (1979)	Peak position
Australia (Kent Music Report)	54
Canada (RPM Disco 30)	7
Canada (RPM Top 100)	20
Sweden (Sverigetopplistan)	19
United Kingdom (Official Charts Company)	9
United States (Billboard Hot 100)	79
US Billboard Disco Top 80	7
US Billboard Hot Soul Singles	28

== Other versions ==
- Starr later re-recorded the song as part of Ian Levine's Motorcity Records project, along with many of his previous Ric-Tic and Motown songs.
- In 1989, the British singer Michaela released a cover version of the song, which reached number 62 on the UK chart.
