= Irresistible (Steve Harley & Cockney Rebel song) =

1985 song by Steve Harley & Cockney Rebel

Single by Steve Harley & Cockney Rebel
- B-side: "Such Is Life"
- Released: 20 May 1985
- Genre: Pop
- Length: 4:07 (extended version); 3:30 (single version)
- Label: RAK
- Songwriter: Steve Harley
- Producer: Mickie Most

Steve Harley & Cockney Rebel singles chronology
""Make Me Smile (Come Up and See Me)" (re-issue)" (1983)	"Irresistible" (1985)	"The Phantom of the Opera" (1986)

"Irresistible" is a song written and recorded by British singer-songwriter Steve Harley. It was released three times as a single; the first being in 1985 as a non-album single under his band's name Steve Harley & Cockney Rebel. In 1986, a remixed version of the song was released by Harley as a solo single in the UK, and in 1992, he re-released this version as a single in Europe from his solo album Yes You Can. "Irresistible" was written by Harley and produced by English producer Mickie Most.

== Background ==
"Irresistible" was first performed live at Steve Harley & Cockney Rebel's concert at Camden Palace, London, in December 1984. The concert was recorded for a TV broadcast and was released on VHS as Live from London in 1985. This performance of "Irresistible" used lead guitar as a more dominant instrument and featured a verse that was not included in the studio version.

Harley originally offered "Irresistible" to Rod Stewart. The singer expressed an interest in recording it but, knowing how keen Harley was for a hit of his own, he ultimately encouraged Harley to record it himself in the hope that it would put him back in the charts. In a 1985 interview, Harley commented, "I think it's gonna be a single, it's the one Rod's gone away with. [He] wants it as a single, but I want it, I think it's my new 'Make Me Smile'. I think it [could be] a hit [for] anybody. I'm not boasting, I just believe that."

After signing a three-album recording contract with Mickie Most's label RAK, Harley recorded "Irresistible" in 1985 with Most at the producer's helm. It featured Harvey Hinsley on guitar, Adrian Lee on keyboards and Mark Brzezicki of Big Country on drums. Harley told the Daily Mirror in 1985, "I wrote the song for Rod Stewart, but when he heard it he told me it was so good I should do it myself. So I did."

"Irresistible" was released in May 1985 as Harley's debut single for RAK. It peaked at number 81 in the UK Singles Chart and remained in the top 100 for five weeks. Speaking of the song to the Newcastle Journal in 1985, Harley said, "'Irresistible' is pure me. The more I hear it, the more I'm proud of it. It has got its own sound."

== Release ==
"Irresistible" was released by RAK Records as a 7-inch and 12-inch single in the UK, the Netherlands, Germany and Portugal. The B-side, "Such is Life", was written by Harley and produced by Most. It was exclusive to the single and has not appeared on any other release with the exception of the 1988 Steve Harley & Cockney Rebel compilation The Collection. "Such is Life" received its live debut during Cockney Rebel's 1980 UK Christmas tour.

For the 12-inch release, an extended version of "Irresistible" was made by Harley, with Calvin Hayes and Mike Nocito, who would both soon achieve fame in Johnny Hates Jazz. At the time, Hayes, being Most's son, was an A&R man at RAK, while Nocito was an in-house engineer. Cockney Rebel's 1973 song "Sebastian" was included as an additional track on the 12-inch release. Following the song's release as a single, the version has made its only outside appearance on the 1988 compilation The Collection.

"Irresistible" began to receive airplay on BBC Radio 1 and Independent Local Radio from the week commencing 27 May 1985. It continued to be played by many I.L.R. stations until the end of June 1985.

== Music video ==
The song's music video was directed by Marcelo Anciano and produced by AWOG. It features Harley performing the song in a dark room with the use of various lighting and spotlight tricks throughout. RAK booked the use of a studio in West London to shoot the video.

== Critical reception ==
Upon its release, Di Cross of Record Mirror described Harley as a "purveyor of the perfect pop song" and considered "Irresistible" to be "a catchy little number", adding that it is "not quite Cockney Rebel, but then Steve isn't 21 anymore". In another issue of Record Mirror, "Irresistible" was one of a number of singles reviewed by ABC. Mark White commented that the song "sounds like it was written, arranged and produced on a poolside in LA", and David Yarritu added, "This would be good if someone like Lulu was singing it... jaunty, I liked the marimbas." Phil Murphy of Newcastle Journal commented on the unlikely blend of pairing of Harley's "original melodic rock" and Most's "sometimes crass pop". He added, "An ironic letter home from a soldier in Belfast, it is couched in jaunty love song format and works well." John W. Milne of the Banffshire Journal noted that Harley had returned with an "excellent single". Graham Moss of the West Cumberland Times and Star called Steve Harley & Cockney Rebel "one of the more competent pop/rock outfits of the '70s" and noted that, with "Irresistible", "we find Harley '85 sounds little different to the Harley of '75". He continued, "Hardly earth-shattering, but a hook or two, a decent tune and a record as worthy as any of the above [reviewed] of a chart place."

Max Bell of Number One was negative in his review, writing, "Irresistible? Hardly. Remember 'Mr Soft'? 'Come Up and See Me, Make Me Smile'? You don't? You're not missing much, except that they were a thousand times more entertaining than this hackneyed dirge. Knock it on the head Steve, there's a good chap." Jack Barron of Sounds stated, "Lo! Look what this way slithers from the ago of pop purgatory – 'tis Cockney Rebel. Lo! Look what slips that way into the bin – 'tis a Steve Harley record."

In his 1990 book The Penguin Encyclopedia of Popular Music, Donald Clarke noted, "Harley came back in '85 and skirted the charts with the catchy 'Irresistible'."

== Track listings ==
7-inch single (UK, the Netherlands, Germany and Portugal)

1. "Irresistible" – 3:30
2. "Such is Life" – 3:52

12-inch single (UK and Germany)

1. "Irresistible" (Extended Version) – 4:07
2. "Sebastian" – 5:42
3. "Such is Life" – 3:52

== Personnel ==
Irresistible

- Steve Harley – vocals
- Harvey Hinsley – guitar
- Adrian Lee – keyboards
- Mark Brzezicki – drums

Production

- Mickie Most – producer
- Mike Nocito – engineer, remixer of "Irresistible (Extended Version)"
- Steve Harley – remixer of "Irresistible (Extended Version)"
- Calvin Hayes – remixer of "Irresistible (Extended Version)"
- Neil Harrison – producer of "Sebastian"

Other

- Crocodi Le Suite (London) – sleeve design

== Charts ==
Chart (1985)	Peak position
UK Singles (Official Charts Company)	81

== 1986 version ==
"Irresistible"

Single by Steve Harley

from the album El Gran Senor
- B-side: "Lucky Man"
- Released: 23 June 1986
- Genre: Pop
- Length: 5:12 (extended version); 3:26 (single version)
- Label: RAK
- Songwriter: Steve Harley
- Producer: Mickie Most

Steve Harley singles chronology
"Heartbeat Like Thunder" (1986)	"Irresistible" (1986)	""Mr. Soft" (re-issue)" (1988)

=== Background ===
In 1986, "Irresistible" was remixed and released again as a single. For the new version, Harley worked with recording engineer Stuart Breed at Air Studios in London. Breed came to Harley's attention through Most, who knew of his work. For the remix, the pair used the original 1985 recording session on a 2-inch master tape. Breed and Harley mixed-and-matched parts of the track and experimented with equipment. The song ended up being sped-up and dramatically altered from its original form. The original version's guitar solo was replaced by a keyboard solo, which had been recorded during the original sessions with Most. The vocals used were from a different take from the original 1985 24-track 2-inch tape.

Speaking to Record Collector in 1992, Harley said of the remixing of "Irresistible",

"'Irresistible' came out [in 1985], but this is a new mix and it's fabulous. I gave it to a guy who works at Air Studios in London, Stuart Breed. He has done a fantastic job. I went in initially as the producer to do it with him, but after half an hour of this guy hitting the buttons and doing fantastic things with sampling machines, I said 'I'm going for a cup of tea, you get on with it'."

In 2013, the engineer Matt Butler recalled of the 1986 remix,

"Breed did an exceptional job, not least as a maintenance engineer made a career-threatening error on the morning of the session and recorded a sublime 1kHz tone over the original multi-track up until around the first chorus of "Irresistible" as made by Mickie Most a year before. The client (Steve Harley) kept his cool of course and he and Stuart came up with this gem of a version."

Harley told the Evening Times in 1986 that he hoped the single would "firmly re-establish me on the music scene". He continued, "We've re-released the song, but it's not the same record as last year. This one's been completely re-done – it's a whole new record. We did a lot of work to change and improve it. Mickie and I have always believed it'd be a hit record. Although it got a lot of airplay last year, for some reason it just never sold in the shops."

"Irresistible" was released in June 1986 as the lead single from Harley's forthcoming solo album El Gran Senor, but it failed to enter the top 100 of the UK Singles Chart, stalling at number 158. In May 1986, Harley announced his intention to embark on a UK tour in September 1986 to promote El Gran Senor. However, soon after the release of "Irresistible", RAK folded and was sold to EMI, which in turn resulted in the album being shelved and Harley left without a record deal. Some of the songs due to appear on the album would appear on Harley's 1992 album Yes You Can, including Breed's five-minute extended remix of "Irresistible" as the opening track. In 2015, Harley commented on the song, "I always thought it should be a hit. I found it hard to give up trying!"

=== Release ===
"Irresistible" was released by RAK Records in the UK on 23 June 1986. Both the 7-inch and 12-inch formats came with a colour picture sleeve, featuring a photograph of Harley taken by John Stoddart. The 12-inch format features an extended remix of "Irresistible". The B-side, "Lucky Man", was written by Harley and produced by Most. It was exclusive to the single and has not appeared on any other release since. The song features Mick Ronson on guitar and Mark Brzezicki on drums. Harley had first met Ronson in the 1970s and during his sessions with Most, Harley contacted Ronson and asked him to play guitar on the track. Harley later recalled, "Mick played guitar on 'Lucky Man'. It's a white reggae rhythm. Mick was as easy as could be, musically he was very quick and adaptable. I experimented with several guitar approaches, and naturally they were all well within his scope." Speaking to Classic Rock in 2008, Harley said, "I produced a track for myself in the mid-80s - a song called 'Lucky Man' - with Mick on electric guitar. It was difficult for me. Not that Ronno was a problem himself - you couldn't wish to meet a nicer, more generous man and musician - but I was in awe of him, even though we had socialised somewhat and shared a mutual respect."

=== Promotion ===
On 30 July 1986, Harley appeared on the BBC television chat show Wogan, presented by Terry Wogan, which featured a performance of "Irresistible". The same date also saw the broadcast of Harley performing the song with his backing band on the ITV children's TV programme Razzamatazz.

=== Critical reception ===
In July 1986, the Newcastle Evening Chronicle reviewed the single and commented that the song was "as the title says". Andy Gill of New Musical Express described "Irresistible" as "fairly pleasant" but in reference to the sleeve he added, "Only Brian Eno can afford to recede that much and remain a celebrity, Steve." Robin Smith of Record Mirror wrote, "Out once again is this darn catchy song, all sweaty and breathless. I'd much rather listen to this than That Petrol Emotion or Easterhouse any day. Harley is now nearly as bald as Phil Collins. Is this a sign of further great things to come?" John Lee of the Huddersfield Daily Examiner described it as "a bouncy and endearingly catchy number". He noted the song's failure to make "much impression" when originally released in 1985, but believed this time it would be a hit. Niall Donnelly of the Bolton Evening News stated that it's a "pleasant enough song, but it's difficult to see who will buy it". Simon Warner of the Halifax Evening Courier called it "highly resistible" and added that the "rather muggy remix probably won't fare better" than the original did.

=== Track listings ===
7-inch single (UK)

1. "Irresistible" – 3:26
2. "Lucky Man" – 3:36

12-inch single (UK)

1. "Irresistible" (Extended Re-Mix) – 5:12
2. "Lucky Man" – 3:36

=== Personnel ===
Production

- Mickie Most – producer
- Stuart Breed – remixer
- Matt Butler – engineer

Other

- John Stoddart – photography
- Shoot That Tiger! – sleeve design

=== Charts ===
Chart (1986)	Peak position
UK Singles Chart	158

== 1992 re-release ==
"Irresistible"

Single by Steve Harley

from the album Yes You Can
- B-side: "The Waggon"
- Released: 1992
- Genre: Pop
- Length: 3:21
- Label: Comeuppance
- Songwriter: Steve Harley
- Producers: Mickie Most; Steve Harley

Steve Harley singles chronology
""Make Me Smile (Come Up and See Me) (re-issue)" (1992)	"Irresistible" (1992)	"Star for a Week (Dino)" (1993)

=== Background ===
In 1992, "Irresistible" was released for the third and final time as a single. A re-release of Breed's 1986 remix, the song was released in Europe as the lead single from Harley's third solo album Yes You Can. In his 1992 interview with Record Collector, Harley said, "I've just released a new album called Yes You Can in Europe, but it's not out in this country [UK]. I'm very proud of it. 'Irresistible' is out over there as a single – it was never released over there at the time."

=== Release ===
"Irresistible" was released as a CD single by Comeuppance Ltd in Europe. The release included a new "Radio Edit" of the song, Breed's extended remix (also the album version on Yes You Can), and a B-side titled "The Waggon". The single was mastered by Steve Rooke and Ian Jones at Abbey Road Studios in London. On the release, as well as Yes You Can, production was credited to Most and Harley.

"The Waggon" was written by Harley, and produced by Harley and Matt Butler. An earlier version of the song originally appeared as the B-side to Harley's 1989 single "When I'm with You", where it was titled "The Theme from Babbacombe Lee".

=== Critical reception ===
In a retrospective review of Yes You Can, Dave Thompson of AllMusic stated, "There are some heartwarming moments on this album. 'Irresistible' very nearly is..."

=== Track listing ===
CD single (Europe)

1. "Irresistible" (Radio Edit) – 3:21
2. "Irresistible" (Album Version) – 5:04
3. "The Waggon" – 3:04

=== Personnel ===
Production

- Steve Harley – producer on "Irresistible" and "The Waggon"
- Mickie Most – producer on "Irresistible"
- Stuart Breed – remixer on "Irresistible"
- Matt Butler – producer on "The Waggon"
- Ian Jones, Steve Rooke – mastering

Other

- Kevin Williamson, Mike Simister – illustration
- Steven D. Schwachter – art layout, design
