= Star for a Week (Dino) =

1993 song by Steve Harley

Single by Steve Harley

from the album Yes You Can
- B-side: "The Lighthouse"
- Released: 1993
- Genre: Pop, rock
- Length: 4:33
- Label: Food for Thought Records
- Songwriter: Steve Harley
- Producers: Steve Harley; Matt Butler

Steve Harley singles chronology
"Irresistible" (1992)	"Star for a Week (Dino)" (1993)	"Make Me Smile (Come Up and See Me) (re-issue)" (1995)

"Star for a Week (Dino)" is a pop-rock song by English singer-songwriter Steve Harley, released as a promotional single in 1993 from his third solo studio album, Yes You Can. The single coincided with the UK release of the album that year (Yes You Can had been released in Europe in 1992). It was the second single to be released from the album, following "Irresistible" as a European single in 1992. "Star for a Week (Dino)" was written by Harley, and was produced by Harley and Matt Butler.

== Background ==
"Star for a Week" was first performed live at Harley's sold out Hammersmith Odeon concert in October 1979. For many years after, the song was regularly performed live, which established the song as a fan favourite. It was announced in London's Evening News in both October 1979 and June 1980 that the song was shortly to be recorded and released as an upcoming single, but those plans did not materialise. After signing to RAK Records in 1984, a studio recording of the song was to be included on Harley's 1986 solo album El Gran Senor, however the album was shelved after the label went bankrupt in 1986.

A few years later, the song was re-recorded for the Yes You Can album. Like much of the album, it was recorded and remixed at the White House Studios in Bures, Suffolk. After Yes You Can was released in Europe in 1992, Harley struck a deal with Food for Thought Records, who gave the album a UK release in 1993. "Star for a Week (Dino)" was issued as a promotional single in attempt to gain radio play and promote the album. In Belgium, the song received airplay on Radio 21, where it was placed on the station's A List, and BRTN's Radio Donna, where it was B listed.

== Inspiration ==
The song's lyrics are based on the true story of Orestes Babouris, a 17-year-old of Brandon, Suffolk, who was also known as Dino. In the period of a week in August 1979, Babouris carried out a number of armed robberies and stole several cars. Initially he and another 17-year-old, Andrew Ross, stole £700 from a man using imitations guns. They booked themselves into the Golden Galleon Motel at Oulton Broad to lie low, and fired at two policemen when they arrived to question the youths on 16 August. Dino's mother, Mrs. Pearl Babouris, pleaded to her son on television and radio to hand himself in, and the "most wanted teenager in Britain" continued to evade capture until 23 August when he was stopped at a roadblock at Thrapston and taken to Huntingdon Police Station. Babouris was given a six-year sentence, whereas Ross, who was captured at an earlier date, was given a four-year sentence.

Intrigued by the story, Harley wrote "Star for a Week" using many lines that he heard through TV news coverage of the two outlaws, and quotes from Dino's mother in particular. The line featuring "the man with no name" referenced the Clint Eastwood character of the same name, which a victimised postmistress had used to describe Dino. Harley felt the story had a little bit of "Billy the Kid" about it. He told The Evening News in 1979, "I just found the way in which he chose to escape from police then gave himself up again a great gesture." He added to the newspaper in 1980, "I know Dino's crimes were serious and I don't want to glorify him at all. It's just that I find him and the things he did totally fascinating. Although he was a criminal he has a kind of Billy the Kid feel about him. And the things he did were, to me, symbolic of the frustration that a lof of young people feel in this country."

In a live performance of the song at Brighton in 1989, Harley revealed:

"This is a song with a story which for me illustrates the undying, relentless loyalty and faith which a mother has for her son. About nine or ten years ago, there's this boy in Norfolk called Dino, who was running around with a shotgun, holding up some post offices. He got caught eventually, red handed. I remember the cops said to him, 'What'd you do it for? You've never done anything wrong before in your life'. And he said 'I just wanted to be somebody, I just wanted to be a star for a week or two'. Well he was that, it was on the national news. Little did he know his mum said, 'It wasn't my Dino, couldn't be Dino, couldn't be Dino. He lives for his motorcycle, he wouldn't do such a thing, couldn't be Dino.' [He was] caught red handed, he confessed: 'My mum still thinks I got a day job'."

Speaking of the song's story at a 2011 concert in Athens, Greece, Harley commented further:

"This song is about two young men. They were in the late teens and went on the run in the UK in the late '70s, close to where I live now, in East Anglia. And they had a shotgun - they were holding up and raiding small post offices and newspaper shops. They were terrifying mostly elderly, innocent people who ran these shops. And I listened - I wrote down all the stuff that this story was about and I took a lot of the original words that people used in their press reports, and I wrote them all down. The boy was from a Greek family - the leader of the gang of two. He was called Dino. They spoke to his mother one day and they asked her what he was doing, why he was doing this? And she said to them, 'I don't know - I think he just wants to be somebody. He just wants to be someone.' They asked, 'What do you mean by that?' and she said, 'He just wants to be a star for a week or two', and I'm writing it down, thinking, 'Oh, this is great'. And I wrote it all down, and she wrote me a chorus – his mum, and the rest of it was the story I got. I used to say years ago when I sang this song on stage, I'd say that I borrowed some of the lyrics from other people. It's not entirely true – as I get older my conscience has got the better of me – and I have to confess I didn't borrow them at all – I stole them."

== Release ==
"Star for a Week (Dino)" was released by Food for Thought Records on CD in the UK only. The B-side, "The Lighthouse", was written by Harley and was taken from Yes You Can. The single had no artwork and was issued in a clear plastic sleeve.

Following its original release, the song has appeared on three compilations; 1998's More Than Somewhat – The Very Best of Steve Harley, 2000's Best of the 70's and 2006's The Cockney Rebel – A Steve Harley Anthology.

Live versions of the song have also been recorded and released. The song was performed at Steve Harley & Cockney Rebel's 1984 concert at the Camden Palace, London, which was filmed for TV and released on the VHS Live from London in 1985. In 1989, the band's Brighton concert included the song and was released on the VHS The Come Back, All is Forgiven Tour: Live. Another version appears on the 1995 album Live at the BBC, which Harley recorded during a session for Nicky Campbell in 1992, and another was included on the 1999 album Stripped to the Bare Bones.

== Critical reception ==
Upon its release, Anthony Seymour of The Journal wrote: "Harley's new single, 'Star for a Week', sounds promising. Let's hope it gets some air time." In a review of Yes You Can, Dave Thompson of AllMusic felt that the song and its B-side failed to c[o]me to life" on the studio recording, whereas live they "emerge with vibrant electricity, as emotionally charged as any old favorites, as deliciously delivered as they deserved". He concluded, "In the studio, though the quality remains, the emotion pales, and Harley's energies – hitherto rejuvenated after so long in abeyance – flag accordingly." Thompson also spoke of the song in a review of the Make Me Smile - Live on Tour album from 1996, calling them the "highlights [that] work far more effectively live than they did in the studio".

In a review of Harley's 1998 concert at Sheffield, Peter Kane of Q stated, "To make sure this particular evening goes with a swing, it certainly helps that the audience could have handpicked that very afternoon from the streets of Sheffield. At least half of them seem to know all the words to everything, not just the familiar old stuff like 'Judy Teen' and 'Mr. Soft', but even the comparatively recent 'The Last Time I Saw You' and 'Star for a Week (Dino)'. They sing along whether encouraged to do so or not. Mostly not. It's like stumbling into a private function with its own mystifying rules and rituals."

== Track listing ==
CD single

1. "Star for a Week (Dino)" – 4:33
2. "The Lighthouse" – 5:58

== Personnel ==
"Star for a Week (Dino)"

- Steve Harley – vocals
- Alan Darby – guitar
- Nick Pynn – violin
- Ian Nice – keyboards
- Billy Dyer – bass
- Paul Francis – drums

"The Lighthouse"

- Steve Harley – vocals, 12 string acoustic guitar, harmonica
- Rick Driscoll – guitar
- Barry Wickens – violin
- Ian Nice – keyboards
- Kevin Powell – bass
- Stuart Elliott – drums

Production

- Steve Harley – production ("Star for a Week", "The Lighthouse")
- Matt Butler – production, engineering ("Star for a Week", "The Lighthouse")
- Simon Smart – engineering ("The Lighthouse")
- Ian Jones, Steve Rooke – mastering ("Star for a Week", "The Lighthouse")
