= Herb McQuay =

American singer

- Born: September 27, 1948; United States
- Died: June 29, 2005.
- Genres: Soul, Jazz
- Occupation: Entertainer
- Years active: 1969–2005
- Label: Ode

Herb McQuay (died June 29, 2005) was a popular jazz and soul singer from New York who lived and worked in New Zealand during the late 1970s to the mid 1980s. He is remembered for his cover of the Edwin Starr song, "Oh How Happy", which was a minor hit for him.

== Background ==
For a period of time, McQuay and his family resided in Auckland. While in New Zealand, he recorded an album and had a number of singles released. McQuay had also recorded radio jingles.

McQuay was born in New York. While in high school, he was a member of a street corner a cappella quartet. After high school, he studied music education at Shaw University. After he was drafted into the army in 1969.

== Career ==
=== 1970s ===
While in the Army, McQuay was a member of the Special Services Entertainment Division and went to Korea, Vietnam, Okinawa and Thailand and to Germany. Later after heading back to New York, he was in Germany and then went around Europe. He was later working cabaret as a result of getting a Managerial contact in Britain. His single "Runnin' Away From You", written by Colin Frechter and John Goodison, backed with his own composition "Storm Clouds" was released on the Bell label in 1974. He first arrived in New Zealand in 1975 or 1976. There he appeared at Auckland's Tanui Tavern By 1979, McQuay was hoping to settle in New Zealand permanently.

=== 1980s ===
In 1980, his single "Oh How Happy" was released on the Ode label. In 1981, McQuay recorded his first album at Mandrill Studios. The album tracks included "Oh How Happy", "You Are The One", "Do Your Thing", "Hey Girl", "Mrs. Jones", "A Change Is Gonna Come, So You Win Again", "Unchained Melody Blues" and Storm Clouds". Towards the end of that year, on 18 December, Ernestine Anderson, with Blue Market Quintet appeared at His Majesty's Theatre in Auckland. McQuay also appeared at the event. Around 1982, he narrated the New Zealand made documentary Flying Light.... In a Sky of Our Own, a Graham McLean production which featured hang gliding champion, Graeme Bird piloting a microlight aircraft. Taj Mahal, provided music for the documentary. In 1983, his single "Night People" bw "Superstar was released. The record which was recorded at Mandrill Studios was produced by Richard Lush. On July 22, 1984, McQuay was appearing with his trio at the Auckland Art Gallery.

In 1986, after residing in New Zealand for four years, McQuay and his family left New Zealand for San Francisco.

==== Post New Zealand ====
In 1989, he was appearing at the Juniper Lounge at the High Sierra. He was there in May. Then he appeared later in the year. He was booked from the 26th of September to the first of October.

During the 80s, McQuay had worked with big names such as Smokey Robinson, Billy Dee Williams and The Brotherhood of Man. In New York, he appeared in productions such as Porgy and Bess and Bye Bye Birdie.

=== 1990s onwards ===
He spent 10 years from 1995 to 2005 as a member of one of the versions of The Platters.

== Death ==
He died on June 29, 2005, aged 56.

== Discography ==
Singles
Title	Release info	Year	Notes
"Hey Girl" / "Storm Clouds"	Mascot MS 002	1974	NZ release 1981 release according to 45cat
"Runnin' Away From You" / "Storm Clouds"	Bell BELL 1398	1974 / 1975	UK release
"Fever Part 1" / "Fever Part 2"	Atlantic Z10003	1977	NZ release
"Oh How Happy" / "Mrs Jones"	Ode ODE 711	1980	NZ release
"We'll Never Cry Alone" / "You Are The One"	Philips HM 7	1982	NZ release Produced by Carl Doy
"Night People" / "Superstar"	Festival K 9046	1983	NZ release

EP and albums
Title	Release info	Year	Notes
You Are The One	Ode SODE 151	1981	LP album
Touch		1991	Cassette EP

== Film and television ==
Titles
Title	Role	Director	Year	Notes #
Live from Chips	himself		1981	
Flying Light.... In a Sky of Our Own	narrator	Grahame McLean	1983	
Hey Herb, (television show)	himself			shown locally in Reno and Sacramento
