= War & Peace (Edwin Starr album) =

Studio album by Edwin Starr
- Released: August 7, 1970
- Genre: Soul, rhythm and blues, funk, psychedelic soul
- Length: 38:45
- Label: Motown Records/Gordy
- Producer: Edwin Star, Johnny Bristol, Harvey Fuqua, Henry Cosby, Norman Whitfield, Ivy Joe Hunter

Edwin Starr chronology
Just We Two (1969)	War & Peace (1970)	Involved (1971)

Singles from War & Peace
- 1. "War" Released: June 10, 1970

War & Peace is the third studio album by R&B singer Edwin Starr released on August 7, 1970, by Motown Records. The album peaked at No. 9 on the US Billboard Top Soul Albums chart and No. 52 on the Billboard 200. War & Peace also peaked at No. 21 on the Canadian RPM Top 100 Albums chart.

== Background ==
War & Peace was arranged by David Van De Pitte, Henry Cosby, Paul Riser, Wade Marcus and Willie Shorter. Starr, Johnny Bristol, Harvey Fuqua, Henry Cosby, Norman Whitfield and Ivy Joe Hunter served as the album's producers.

== Singles ==
The album's main single, "War", ranked No. 1 on the Billboard Hot 100 chart for three weeks. "War" also peaked at No. 3 on the UK Pop singles chart and has been certified silver in the UK by the British Phonographic Industry.

== Critical reception ==
Professional ratings
Review scores
Source	Rating
AllMusic	4.5/5 stars

Ron Wynn of Allmusic gave the album a four and a half out of five stars rating. Wynn called War & Peace "without question his finest" album.

As a single, War was nominated for Best Male R&B Vocal Performance at the 13th Annual Grammy Awards in 1971.

== Track listing ==
No.	Title	Writer(s)	Producer(s)	Length
1.	"War"	Norman Whitfield, Barrett Strong	Norman Whitfield	3:12
2.	"Running Back and Forth"	Richard "Popcorn" Wylie, Edwin Starr	Edwin Starr	2:50
3.	"Adios Senorita"	Sylvia Moy, Henry Cosby	Henry Cosby	2:31
4.	"All Around the World"	Titus Turner	Johnny Bristol	2:56
5.	"I Can't Escape Your Memory"	Ivy Hunter, Jack Alan Goga	Ivy Hunter	2:58
6.	"At Last (I Found Love)"	Elgie Stover, Anna Gordy Gaye, Marvin Gaye	Johnny Bristol	2:51
7.	"I Just Wanted to Cry"	Johnny Bristol, Edwin Starr	Johnny Bristol	2:59
8.	"Raindrops Keep Fallin' on My Head"	Burt Bacharach, Hal David	Edwin Starr	3:15
9.	"Time"	Richard "Popcorn" Wylie, Edwin Starr	Edwin Starr	2:54
10.	"California Soul"	Nick Ashford, Valerie Simpson	Edwin Starr	3:50
11.	"I Can't Replace My Old Love"	Harvey Fuqua, Arthur Scott, Vernon Williams	Harvey Fuqua	4:10
12.	"She Should Have Been Home"	Johnny Bristol, Doris McNeil	Johnny Bristol	2:59
