= Yes You Can (album) =

Studio album by Steve Harley
- Released: 1992 (Europe); 1993 (UK)
- Genre: Pop rock
- Labels: CTE (Europe); Food For Thought Records (UK)
- Producers: Steve Harley; Matt Butler; Mickie Most

Steve Harley chronology
Make Me Smile – The Best of Steve Harley and Cockney Rebel (1992)	Yes You Can (1992)	Poetic Justice (1996)

Singles from Yes You Can
- 1. "Irresistible" Released: 1992 (Europe only); 2. "Star for a Week (Dino)" Released: 1993 (UK promotional only)

Alternative Cover
- UK 1993 cover of Yes You Can

Yes You Can is the third solo studio album by British singer-songwriter Steve Harley. It was released by CTE in Europe in 1992 and by Food For Thought Records in the UK on 4 May 1993.

Yes You Can was Harley's first studio album since 1979's The Candidate. It contains songs he wrote and originally recorded in the 1980s alongside newer material. The album was produced by Harley and Matt Butler, except "Rain in Venice" which was produced Mickie Most, Harley and Butler, and "Irresistible" which was produced by Most and Harley.

== Background ==
After his success with Cockney Rebel in the 1970s, Harley was less active in the music industry during the 1980s. He released the occasional single, some of which became minor hits, and performed live on a limited basis only. In 1985, he signed a new contract with Mickie Most's Rak Records and began recording material for a new solo album, El Gran Senor, at RAK Studios in London. Some of the tracks recorded for the project included "Irresistible", "Rain in Venice", "New-Fashioned Way", "The Lighthouse", "Star for a Week", "Promises Promises", "Sophistication" and the 1966 Edwin Starr-penned song "Oh How Happy". "Irresistible" was released as a single in 1985 and a remixed version was also issued as a single in the following year. The 1986 single announced the upcoming album El Gran Senor, but before it was released, RAK folded and was sold to EMI, and the album was shelved.

Harley returned to touring with a new line-up of Steve Harley & Cockney Rebel in 1989. Before the tour, Harley and ex-Cockney Rebel members Duncan Mackay and Jim Cregan entered Point Studios in London to write and record four new songs, "Dancing on the Telephone", "When I'm with You", "The Alibi" and "Limbs of Men". In early 1989, Harley announced that an album of new material would be recorded in the summer and released in the autumn. Although no album materialised, Harley revealed in 1990 that work on the album was almost completed, but he was unsure when it would be released as he had no record deal. He listed the likely inclusions of the album as being "The Lighthouse", "Star for a Week", "Promises", "Victim of Love", "Dancing on the Telephone" and "Not Alone Anymore" – the latter being a cover of the 1988 song by the supergroup Traveling Wilburys.

In 1992, Harley revealed to Record Collector, "I'm very proud of it. It sounds like a hundred and fifty grand album, and I've spent about a quarter of that on it. Because we were so well rehearsed we went in and played. I do use state of the art equipment. I've been 19 years in the business, as a professional, so I know a few tricks." Harley was inspired to give the album the title Yes You Can after he watched an "overweight" woman reach the finish line of the New York City Marathon on TV. He told the Sunday Express, "The image stayed with me. People can do whatever they want."

== Recording ==
All tracks were recorded at the White House Studios in Bures, Suffolk, except "Irresistible", which was recorded at RAK Studios, and "Rain in Venice", recorded at RAK Studios and Metropolis Studios. "Rain in Venice", "New-Fashioned Way", "The Lighthouse", "The Alibi" and "Promises" were remixed at Metropolis Studios, and "Victim of Love", "Star for a Week (Dino)", "Fire in the Night" and "Dancing on the Telephone" were remixed at White House Studios. "Irresistible" was remixed at Air Studios. The album was mastered by Steve Rooke and Ian Jones at Abbey Road Studios in London.

Harley recorded sixteen tracks during the sessions for Yes You Can and ultimately chose ten to include on the album, leaving the remaining six unreleased. Rod Stewart provided some backing vocals for the album, but his contributions were not used.

== Song information ==
Yes You Can features a mixture of older songs dating from the El Gran Senor period as well as some newer tracks. Two of the tracks, the 1986 extended remix of "Irresistible" and "Rain in Venice", were recorded during the El Gran Senor sessions. "Star for a Week (Dino)", "New-Fashioned Way", "Promises" and "The Lighthouse" were all originally recorded for El Gran Senor and then fully re-recorded for Yes You Can. Harley decided to re-record "New-Fashioned Way" after he began performing the song live in 1991. "Star for a Week", one of the oldest songs, was written and first performed live in 1979. "The Lighthouse" was described by Harley as "another nod to Virginia Woolf", following his song "Riding the Waves (For Virginia Woolf)" from his 1978 album Hobo with a Grin. "The Alibi" and "Dancing on the Telephone" were written and demoed in 1989 before being recorded for Yes You Can. Two of the newer songs, "Victim of Love" and "Fire in the Night", were written while Steve Harley & Cockney Rebel were on tour in the early 1990s.

== Release ==
Yes You Can was released on CD and cassette by CTE in Europe in 1992. It was marketed and distributed by Cte GmbH and manufactured in Switzerland. At the same time, "Irresistible" was released for the third and final time as a single, but also in Europe only and not the UK.

Speaking to Record Collector in 1992, Harley was asked about the possibility of EMI releasing the album in the UK. Harley said,

"I don't know what they'll think of it. I just don't bloody know what they think of me in this country. I tell you what, it's not going to do the rounds. I'm too long in the tooth to suffer that. I don't like being rejected. This is a class record, I'm proud of it. I've worked years on it. I won't write those songs again. There are a couple on there that mean a lot to me and I want them to be heard by people. I have my own company, that's who paid for it. But I can't release it. I need a major label in this country to set it up and promote it properly. I want it to be with a major, not a small label. But it will only be offered one by one to people in a position of power. I don't want to be rejected by a guy who's scared of losing his job. They won't take risks. I would be a risk for British record companies. I'm not seventeen but this is a class record, and it could still sell in enormous quantities. It's very personal, but universal. It's very philosophical and asks a lot of questions."

Yes You Can was given a UK CD and cassette release on 4 May 1993 by Food for Thought Records, a sub-label of Music for Nations. The release had a re-arranged track listing and a different sleeve design from the European release. A promotional single, "Star for a Week (Dino)", was released to generate radio play. Harley had expressed wishes for the label to release "Victim of Love" as a single. Harley also previously made plans to release the song as a single in the summer of 1990. In 1994, Music for Nations listed Yes You Can at number 19 for their "top twenty selling albums of the year [1993]".

On 22 April 2002, the album was re-issued in the UK by Harley's own label Comeuppance. It uses the 1992 CTE release's artwork and track order. On 6 October 2003, Voiceprint Records released the album on CD together with Harley's album The Candidate as part of the label's "2 for One Series".

== Tour ==
To promote the European release of the album in 1992, Harley embarked on the Yes You Can tour. In March, he played various dates across Europe which was followed by a set of UK dates in May. To promote the album's 1993 UK release, a UK tour commenced on 7 May.

== Critical reception ==
Professional ratings
Review scores
Source	Rating
AllMusic	2.5/5 stars

Upon its release, Daily Mirror picked Yes You Can as their "album of the week" and noted that "Harley's talent shines on stunning tracks" like "Star for a Week (Dino)" and "Irresistible". Andrew Thomas of The Westmorland Gazette praised it as a "strong set" with "some great pop songs, notably" "Dancing on the Telephone", "Irresistible" and "Victim of Love". He added that "Rain in Venice" is a "pleasing ballad" and "Star for a Week (Dino)" is "full of understated drama". He concluded, "Overall, this is an impressive return to the recording scene – let's hope it's not as long before the next album." Steve Jackson of the Grimsby Evening Telegraph described it as "10 tracks of commercial Harley rock" with his "familiar vocal style and phrasing". Jackson added, "I'd like to see Yes You Can zoom up the charts and return one of the lost figures of the seventies back onto our TV screens and on the radio." Peter Kinghorn of Newcastle Evening Chronicle commented, "Although there's nothing with the impact of Cockney Rebel days, Harley can still put over a lyric and the compositions bear the hallmark of quality."

Neil McKay of Sunday Life wrote, "Harley's first album for more than a decade is solid rather than spectacular. Everything is just where it should be, in a modern AOR-ish sort of way, and it cries out for the inspired weirdness that made some of his Cockney Rebel material so good." Andrew Boyd of the Reading Evening Post felt Yes You Can was a "damp squib of an album" and a "dreary, clichéd collection, unlikely to push Harley far into the charts".

Dave Thompson of AllMusic retrospectively reviewed the album, writing, "It's a sad state of affairs, but the best of Yes You Can was never going to make it onto a studio recording. Rather, it resides in the live environment where the songs almost unanimously came to life. In the studio, the emotion pales, and Harley's energies flag accordingly. Yes You Can is not the revival for which fans had been hoping for. But excuse the inadequacies and overlook the lifelessness, and the core of the songs remains sound and proud."

== Track listing ==
All tracks are written by Steve Harley except where noted.

CTE release (Europe, 1992)
No.	Title	Writer(s)	Length
1.	"Irresistible"		5:12
2.	"Victim of Love"	Harley, Ian Nice, Kevin Powell, Barry Wickens, Rick Driscoll	5:33
3.	"Rain in Venice"	Harley, Robin Le Mesurier	4:51
4.	"Star for a Week (Dino)"		4:33
5.	"Promises"		4:47
6.	"Fire in the Night"		3:41
7.	"The Alibi"	Harley, Jim Cregan, Duncan Mackay, Stuart Elliott	6:07
8.	"New-Fashioned Way"	Harley, Mackay	7:17
9.	"The Lighthouse"		6:00
10.	"Dancing on the Telephone"	Harley, Cregan, Elliott	4:04

Food For Thought Records release (UK, 1993)
No.	Title	Length
1.	"Victim of Love"	5:33
2.	"The Lighthouse"	6:00
3.	"Star for a Week (Dino)"	4:33
4.	"Rain in Venice"	4:51
5.	"The Alibi"	6:07
6.	"New-Fashioned Way"	7:17
7.	"Promises"	4:47
8.	"Dancing on the Telephone"	4:04
9.	"Fire in the Night"	3:41
10.	"Irresistible"	5:12

== Personnel ==
- Steve Harley – vocals (all tracks), 12-string acoustic guitar (track 9), harmonica (tracks 2, 9)
- Harvey Hinsley – guitar (track 1)
- Jim Cregan – acoustic guitar (track 3)
- Robin Le Mesurier – electric guitar (track 3)
- Alan Darby – guitar (tracks 4–5, 7, 10)
- Rick Driscoll – rhythm guitar (track 5), guitar (track 9)
- Robbie Gladwell – guitar (tracks 6, 8)
- Nick Pynn – violin (tracks 4, 7), rhythm guitar (track 8), acoustic guitar (track 10)
- Barry Wickens – acoustic guitar (track 2), violin (tracks 2, 5, 9)
- Adrian Lee – keyboards (track 1)
- Duncan Mackay – keyboards (track 3)
- Ian Nice – keyboards (tracks 2, 4–10)
- Kevin Powell – bass (tracks 2, 5, 9)
- Billy Dyer – bass (tracks 4, 7–8, 10)
- Mark Brzezicki – drums (track 1)
- Stuart Elliott – drums (tracks 2, 5, 9)
- Dave Mattacks – drums (track 3)
- Paul Francis – drums (tracks 4, 6–7, 10), hand-snare (track 8)

Production

- Steve Harley – producer (all tracks)
- Mickie Most – producer (tracks 1, 3)
- Matt Butler – producer (tracks 2–10), engineer (tracks 2–10)
- Mike Nocito – engineer (tracks 1, 3)
- Simon Smart – engineer (tracks 2, 5, 9)
- Stuart Breed – remixing (track 1)
- Steve Rooke, Ian Jones – mastering

Other

- Mike Simister, Kevin Williamson – illustrations
- Steve D. Schwachter – art layout, design
