= The Shades of Blue =

American blue-eyed soul vocal group

The Shades of Blue were an American blue-eyed soul vocal group from Livonia, Michigan, a suburb of Detroit.

The band started in high school as the Domingos. Original group members included Nick Marinelli, Ernie Dernai, Linda Allen and Bob Kerr. By 1965, The Domingos signed a recording contract for the Detroit-based Golden World label. John Rhys, a sound engineer, suggested a name change and the Shades of Blue was the result.

Their biggest hit was the song "Oh How Happy", recorded in the fall of 1965 and released in early 1966, written by Edwin Starr, which reached number 12 on the Billboard Hot 100 chart, number 16 on the US Billboard R&B chart and the Top 10 in Canada. That same year, the song "Lonely Summer", again written by Starr, reached number 72, and then "Happiness" peaked at number 78 in the Hot 100.

Taste in popular music changed in the late 1960s, and the group's later single efforts failed to chart and they disbanded in 1970.

In 2003, original member Nick Marinelli joined a Motown group that was reforming, the Valadiers. That lineup, consisting of Marinelli, original Valadier Stuart Avig and new members Andy Alonzo and Donald Revels, began also touring as the Shades of Blue. Revels left the group in 2006 and was replaced by Charlie Valverde; he returned to the group three years later when the last original member, Nick Marinelli, left. Andy Alonzo was replaced by Charles Davis in 2011.
