= Shade of Blue (band) =

Shade of Blue is an R&B and funk band from the Iowa City, Iowa, area. The band got its start in 1989 as a blues trio, and its current lineup of nine members were inducted in the Iowa Rock & Roll Hall of Fame in 2021 and continue to perform today.

== History ==
Shade of Blue was founded by guitarist and vocalist Dave Rosazza as a blues trio in 1989 in the Iowa City, Iowa, area. Soon after, saxophonist Saul Lubaroff joined the band, followed by keyboardist and vocalist Sean Seaton in the early 1990s. The band's sound began to evolve to include rock and R&B, and the addition of bassist Ken Fullard and vocalists Simone Green and Joan Ruffin propelled the band to become one of Eastern Iowa's most popular R&B and funk bands during the mid-1990s. Rounding out the current lineup are keyboardist Denny Kettelson, dummer Matt Bernemann, and percussionist Paul Cunliffe.

Since its formation, Shade of Blue is most known for their high energy live performances, opening for artists such as George Clinton, Koko Taylor and the Neville Brothers, as well as headlining festivals and concert venues such as the historic Englert Theatre. The band has recorded and released two albums of original music, Black & White (1989) and Free Your Mind (1995), and two live albums, Real Live S.O.B. (1998) and Reunion: One Night Only (2012).

== Personnel ==
Current Members

- Matt Bernemann - drums
- Paul Cunliffe - percussion
- Ken Fullard - bass
- Simone Green - lead vocals
- Denny Kettelson - organ, synthesizer
- Saul Lubaroff - saxophone, flute
- Dave Rosazza - vocals, guitar
- Joan Ruffin - lead vocals
- Sean Seaton - vocals, piano, electric piano
