= War (The Temptations song) =

1970 song by The Temptations

Song by the Temptations

from the album Psychedelic Shack
- Released: March 6, 1970
- Recorded: 1969–1970
- Studio: Hitsville U.S.A. (Studio A), Detroit
- Genre: Progressive soul
- Length: 3:11
- Label: Gordy
- Songwriters: Norman Whitfield, Barrett Strong
- Producer: Norman Whitfield

"War" is a counterculture-era soul song written by Norman Whitfield and Barrett Strong for the Motown label in 1969. Whitfield first produced the song – a self-evident anti-Vietnam War statement – with the Temptations as the original vocalists. After Motown began receiving repeated requests to release "War" as a single, Whitfield re-recorded the song with Edwin Starr as the vocalist, with the label deciding to withhold the Temptations' version from single release so as not to alienate that group's more conservative fans. Starr's version of "War" was a No. 1 hit on the Billboard Hot 100 chart in 1970, and is not only the most successful and well-known record of his career, but it is also one of the most popular protest songs ever recorded. It was one of 161 songs on the no-play list issued by Clear Channel following the events of September 11, 2001.

== Temptations' version and initial release ==
The Temptations' version of "War", featuring Paul Williams and Dennis Edwards on lead vocals, was less intense than the Edwin Starr version and begins with marching band drums a la the 20th Century Fox logo. Williams and Edwards deliver the song's anti-war, pro-peace message over a stripped-down instrumental track, with bass singer Melvin Franklin chanting a repeated recruit training-like "hup, two, three, four" in the background during the verses.

The song was included as a track on the March 1970 Psychedelic Shack album, which featured the title track as its only single. The track's direct message, summarized by its chorus ("War, what is it good for? Absolutely nothin'!"), struck a chord with the American public and resonated with growing public opposition to the war in Vietnam. Fans from across the country, many of them college students and other young people, sent letters to Motown requesting the release of "War" as a single. The label did not want to risk the image of its most popular male group, and the Temptations themselves were also apprehensive about releasing such a potentially controversial song as a single. The label decided not to release "War" as a single, a decision that Whitfield fought until the label came up with a compromise: "War" would be released, but it would have to be re-recorded with a different act.

== Edwin Starr version ==
"War"
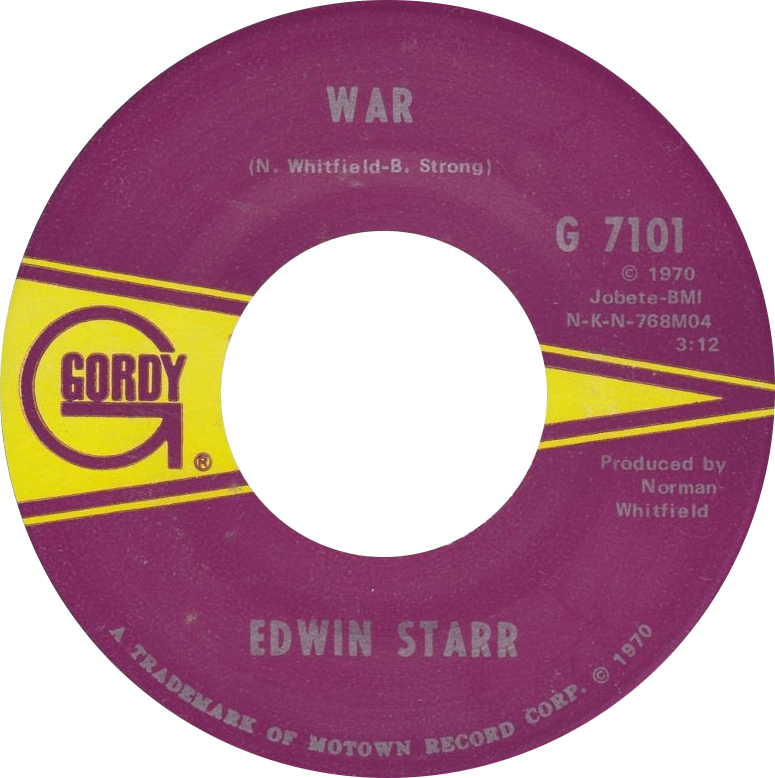
- One of the side-A labels of the US vinyl single

Single by Edwin Starr

from the album War & Peace
- B-side: "He Who Picks a Rose"
- Released: June 10, 1970
- Recorded: May 15, 1970
- Studio: Hitsville U.S.A. (Studio A), Detroit
- Genre: Funk; psychedelic soul
- Length: 3:12
- Label: Gordy (Gordy 7101)
- Songwriters: Norman Whitfield, Barrett Strong
- Producer: Norman Whitfield

Edwin Starr singles chronology
"Time" (1970)	"War" (1970)	"Stop the War Now" (1970)

Alternative edition
- Artwork for Dutch vinyl single

Edwin Starr sings War
Sample of the song

Edwin Starr, who had become a Motown artist in 1968 after his former label, Ric-Tic, was purchased by Motown founder Berry Gordy, became "War's" new vocalist. Considered among Motown's "second-string" acts, Starr had only one major hit to his name by this time, 1968's No. 6 hit "Twenty-Five Miles". He heard about the conflict surrounding the debate of whether or not to release "War", and volunteered to rerecord it. Whitfield recreated the song to match Starr's James Brown-influenced soul shout: the single version of "War" was dramatic and intense, depicting the general anger and distaste the anti-war movement felt towards the war in Vietnam. Unlike the Temptations' original, Starr's "War" was a full-scale Whitfield production, with prominent electric guitar lines, clavinets, a heavily syncopated rhythm accented by a horn section, and with the Originals and Whitfield's new act the Undisputed Truth on backing vocals.

Upon its release in June 1970, Starr's "War" became a runaway hit, and held the No. 1 position on the Billboard Hot 100 for three weeks, in August and September 1970, becoming Starr's only number one hit. It replaced "Make It With You" by Bread, and was itself taken out of the spot by another Motown single, "Ain't No Mountain High Enough" by Diana Ross. Billboard ranked it as the No. 5 song of 1970.

Notable as the most successful protest song to become a pop hit, earning compliments from contemporary protester John Lennon, "War" became Edwin Starr's signature song. Rather than hindering his career (as it might have done for the Temptations), "War" buoyed Starr's career, and he adopted the image of an outspoken liberal orator for many of his other early-1970s releases, including the similarly themed "Stop the War Now" from 1971. It and another 1971 single, "Funky Music Sho' 'Nuff Turns Me On", continued Starr's string of Whitfield-produced psychedelic soul hits. After 1971, Starr's career began to falter, and, citing Motown's reliance on formulas, he departed the label in the mid-1970s. Edwin Starr re-recorded the song in 1992 produced by Simon Harris.

Later in his career, after moving to the United Kingdom, Starr re-recorded several of his hits with British band Utah Saints. Starr's new version of "War" in 2003 was his final piece, but remains unreleased. He died on April 2 of the same year of a heart attack.

Starr earned a Grammy nomination in 1971 for "War" for best R&B Male Vocal. In 1999, Starr's recording of the song was inducted into the Grammy Hall of Fame.

Starr's version of the song was used as the basis for a cover version by Ugly Rumours, a group formed by Tony Blair while at university. The song was released by the Stop the War Coalition and credited to Ugly Rumours, with the band being fronted by a lookalike of Blair. It peaked at number 21 on the UK Singles Chart in March 2007.

=== Charts ===
==== Weekly charts ====
Chart (1970)	Peak position
Australia (Kent Music Report)	37
Belgium (Ultratop 50 Flanders)	16
Canada Top Singles (RPM)	1
Ireland (IRMA)	5
Netherlands (Single Top 100)	14
New Zealand (Listener)	15
Norway (VG-lista)	9
UK Singles (Official Charts)	3
US Billboard Hot 100	1
US Best Selling Soul Singles (Billboard)	3
West Germany (GfK)	9

==== Year-end charts ====
Chart (1970)	Rank
Canada	22
UK	56
US Billboard Hot 100	5
US Billboard R&B	25

=== Certifications ===
Region	Certification	Certified units/sales
New Zealand (RMNZ)	Gold	15,000^{‡}
United Kingdom (BPI)	Silver	200,000^{‡}
^{‡} Sales+streaming figures based on certification alone.

== Frankie Goes to Hollywood version ==
"War"

Single by Frankie Goes to Hollywood

from the album Welcome to the Pleasuredome
- B-side: "Two Tribes (Carnage)"; "One February Friday"
- Released: July 9, 1984
- Genre: Hi-NRG; dance; synthpop; new wave
- Length: 8:33
- Label: ZTT (WARTZ 3)
- Songwriters: Norman Whitfield; Barrett Strong
- Producer: Trevor Horn

Frankie Goes to Hollywood singles chronology
"Relax" (1983)	"War" (1984)	"The Power of Love" (1984)

Frankie Goes to Hollywood followed their debut 1983 UK number one single Relax with Two Tribes. The principal B-side for 12-inch single was a cover version of "War". To build on the chart success of "Two Tribes", "War" became the subject of an accomplished extended remix in its own right (subtitled "Hidden") for the third version of single's UK 12-inch. For the release "War" was promoted as a double-A-side with the "Carnage" mix of "Two Tribes" on the reverse. The 12-inch double-A-side single was released in standard and picture disc versions, both with the ZTT Records catalog number WARTZ 3.

Versions of both "Two Tribes" and "War" would later appear on the group's 1984 debut album Welcome to the Pleasuredome as well as numerous Frankie Goes to Hollywood and ZTT Records compilation albums.

The release of "War" / "Two Tribes" also coincided with an extensive and iconic T-shirt marketing campaign for the band during the summer of 1984, featuring such slogans as "Frankie Say WAR! Hide Yourself", as pictured on the 12" single cover.

Several lines of spoken dialogue were added to the Temptations/Edwin Starr version of the song. Impressionist Chris Barrie voiced the long soliloquy about war and love, while impersonating the American President Ronald Reagan; a role he would later reprise in the hit UK TV Show Spitting Image. Born in Germany, Barrie translated and subversively quoted Adolf Hitler from his failed 1924 putsch trial, in the first new lines added to the song.

== Bruce Springsteen version ==
"War"

Single by Bruce Springsteen and the E Street Band

from the album Live/1975–85
- B-side: "Merry Christmas Baby"
- Released: November 10, 1986
- Recorded: September 30, 1985
- Venue: Los Angeles Memorial Coliseum, Los Angeles
- Genre: Hard rock, funk rock
- Length: 5:10
- Label: Columbia
- Songwriters: Norman Whitfield; Barrett Strong
- Producers: Bruce Springsteen; Jon Landau; Chuck Plotkin

Bruce Springsteen and the E Street Band singles chronology
"My Hometown" (1985)	"War" (1986)	"Fire" (1987)

Music video
- War on Youtube.com

"War" was performed in concert by Bruce Springsteen and the E Street Band in 1985, added to the set list for the final few shows of their lengthy Born in the U.S.A. Tour. Springsteen and his manager Jon Landau sought to make these concluding shows, taking place at the Los Angeles Memorial Coliseum, a little different and special, and Landau suggested playing "War". A year earlier, he had suggested the same, as a loose protest against Reagan administration foreign policy in Central America and elsewhere, but the band had been unable to come up with an effective arrangement at the time.

Performed as a hard rock rendition, Springsteen taped the lyrics to his arm, and prefaced the song with a spoken admonition against blind trust in government or leadership.

Springsteen released the September 30, 1985, performance as part of his 1986 box set, Live/1975–85. "War" was chosen as the first single from the set, reaching # 8 on the Billboard Hot 100 chart and #9 on the Cashbox Top 100, The music video for the single was a straight concert filming of the same performance.

Springsteen continued to perform "War" regularly through his 1988 Tunnel of Love Express and Human Rights Now! Tours. He then retired it for 11 years until a one-off performance alongside Edwin Starr in Birmingham, England, during the Reunion Tour. Springsteen brought the song back for six performances on his 2003 Rising Tour before and in the early days of the Iraq War. Springsteen opened each night of his 2026 Land of Hope and Dreams American Tour with the song as a message to President Donald Trump.

=== Charts ===
Weekly chart performance for Springsteen's cover
Chart (1986–87)	Peak position
Australia (Kent Music Report)	38
Belgium (Ultratop 50 Flanders)	10
Canada (RPM)	11
Europe (Eurochart Hot 100)	10
Ireland (IRMA)	2
Italy (Musica e Dischi)	11
Netherlands (Dutch Top 40)	5
Netherlands (Single Top 100)	8
New Zealand (Recorded Music NZ)	42
Norway (VG-lista)	2
Quebec (ADISQ)	27
Spain (AFE)	30
Sweden (Sverigetopplistan)	4
UK Singles (Official Charts)	18
US Billboard Hot 100	8
West Germany (GfK)	27

=== Other versions ===
- The Jam released a version of "War" as one of the b-sides to their 1982 single "Just Who Is the 5 O'Clock Hero?". That version is available as a bonus track on reissues of their 1982 album The Gift.
- Also in 1982, Vancouver punk band D.O.A. released a version of "War" as the title track of their EP War on 45.
- In 1985, Eddy and the Soulband released the single, "The World Turns On". The group sang parts of "Papa Was a Rollin' Stone" and "War" in a medley.
- In 1998, Bone Thugs-n-Harmony made a song with the same name (featuring Henry Rollins, Tom Morello, and Flea) that interpolates Edwin Starr's chorus.
- For the second season of the legal drama Family Law, a cover of the song by The Brink was used before reverting to using the original Edwin Starr version for its third and final season much like it had utilized in the first season.
- In the 2010 film adaptation of Gulliver's Travels, the song is adapted as a musical production within the movie, with Jack Black singing the lead, and key lines sung by supporting vocalists including Amanda Peet, Billy Connolly, and Emily Blunt.
- Rock band Black Stone Cherry covered "War" on its 2016 album Kentucky.
- In 1992, Edwin recorded a new version produced by Simon Harris.
- Slovenian industrial group Laibach covered this on their 1994 album NATO.

== Personnel ==
=== Edwin Starr version ===
- Edwin Starr – lead vocals
- The Originals (Freddie Gorman, Walter Gaines, Hank Dixon, C.P. Spencer) and The Undisputed Truth (Joe Harris, Billie Rae Calvin, Brenda Joyce Evans) – background vocals
- The Funk Brothers – instrumentation

=== Temptations version ===
- Paul Williams and Dennis Edwards – lead vocals
- Dennis Edwards, Melvin Franklin, Paul Williams, Eddie Kendricks, and Otis Williams – background vocals
- The Funk Brothers – instrumentation

=== Frankie Goes to Hollywood version ===
- Holly Johnson – lead vocals
- Paul Rutherford – backing vocals
- Brian Nash – guitar
- Mark O'Toole – bass
- Peter Gill – drums
- Trevor Horn – producer
- Stuart Bruce, Steve Lipson – engineers
- Ian Cooper – mastering

=== Bruce Springsteen version ===
- Bruce Springsteen – lead vocals
- The E Street Band (Roy Bittan, Clarence Clemons, Danny Federici, Nils Lofgren, Patti Scialfa, Garry Tallent) – background vocals
- The E Street Band – instrumentation

== Legacy of all versions ==
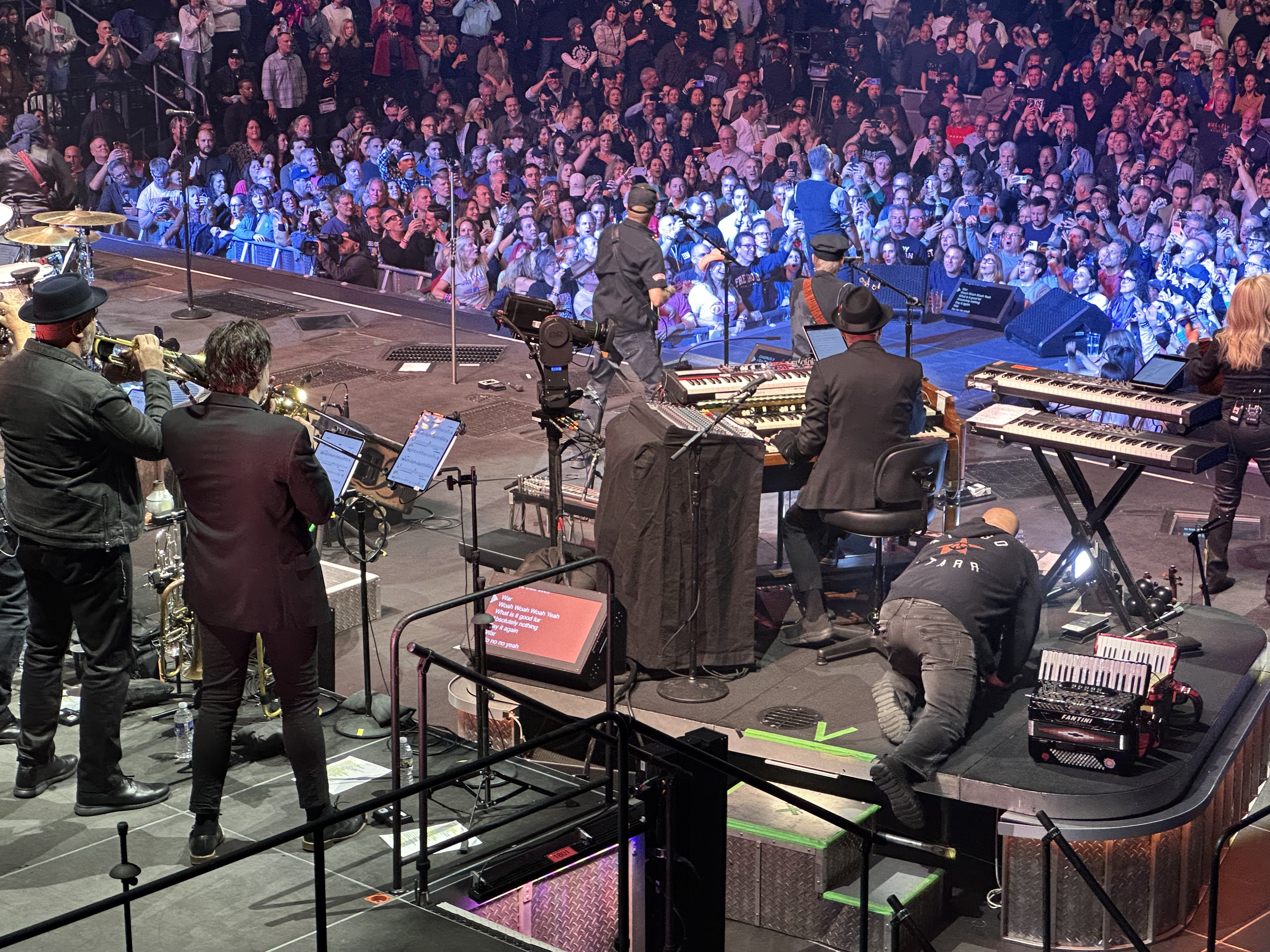
Decades after its initial release, "War" has retained its resonance, here being performed by Bruce Springsteen and the E Street Band, with guest Tom Morello, as the opening song during the Lohad / No Kings Tour shows of 2026

The popular culture centered publication Stereogum released an article by music journalist Tom Breihan in January 2019 that retrospectively highlighted Edwin Starr's version of "War" as one of the greatest number one singles in the history of the Billboard Hot 100. In terms of musical genre and overall style, Breihan remarked that the "groove is huge and all-consuming", particularly since the listener will "hear little accents of guitar or saxophone in between the beats" yet "every instrument on the song, including Starr’s voice, is part of the rhythm section." He stated that the track fundamentally "is weaponized music... that’s impossible to ignore" as a form of social protest. While noting Starr's issues in the navigating the broader music industry, opining that Starr's "primal anti-violence roar outlived him" and may "live forever", Breihan additionally concluded, "Edwin Starr’s 'War' might be the greatest musical document of the movement that sprang up against a war— a hard, intense stomp-chant, as visceral as what the moment demanded."

Music critic David Fricke has argued about Bruce Springsteen and the E Street Band's version of the song that "Springsteen gets right to the point, dedicating it to the post-Vietnam kids in the crowd ('The next time they’re gonna be lookin’ at you') before leading the E Street Band into an explosive reading of the... hit with his best tonsil-ripping yell". He also remarked upon "plenty of spitfire guitar" being a part of that version. Fricke praised the band's overall performance of the track and other songs during its 1970s and 1980s concerts in the pages of the popular culture magazine Rolling Stone.

The Edwin Starr version was used in the first and third films of the Rush Hour trilogy, along with Small Soldiers and The Simpsons' "Treehouse of Horror VIII" (in "The HΩmega Man").

The song was heard in the trailer of the 2011 animated film Hoodwinked Too! Hood vs. Evil.

== See also ==
- 1970 in music
- Bruce Springsteen discography
- Edwin Starr discography
- List of anti-war songs
- List of Billboard Hot 100 number ones of 1970
- The Temptations discography
- Protest music
- Rhythm and blues music
