= Blinky (singer) =

American singer-songwriter (born 1944)

Sondra "Blinky" Williams
- Born: Sondra Williams; May 21, 1944 (age 82); Oakland, California U.S.
- Genres: R&B, Soul
- Occupation: Singer-songwriter
- Instruments: Vocals, piano
- Years active: 1952–present
- Labels: Vee-Jay, Atlantic, Motown, Reprise

Sondra "Blinky" Williams (born May 21, 1944) is an American R&B and soul singer-songwriter, probably best known for singing the female lead on the theme for the 1970s TV series, Good Times.

== Early life ==
Williams was born in Oakland, California, United States, but later grew up in Los Angeles. The daughter of a pastor, she was active in church choirs since the age of six. Her two siblings are Diana Williams Witherspoon and Pastor Austin F. Williams.

== Career ==
She recorded the album Hark the Voice on Atlantic Records, then moved to Motown where she recorded (as "Blinky") five singles including her debut, the Ashford & Simpson penned single "I Wouldn't Change the Man He Is", (a song reportedly written about Lovin' Spoonful studio bass player James Killingsworth) in 1968, and thought she would find success when she recorded a duet album with Edwin Starr entitled Just We Two, on the heels of his 25 Miles.

However, they did not get the promotion that either the Marvin Gaye & Tammi Terrell or the Supremes-Temptations duets did, and success again eluded her when, after becoming a protégé of Sammy Davis Jr., his deal with the label fell through. Blinky released two further singles for Motown in the early 1970s (on the company's California-based MoWest subsidiary) and has had several others scheduled for release that were not issued. She is also credited with singing the theme for the 1970s TV series, Good Times, along with Jim Gilstrap.

In February 1972, Blinky Williams traveled with Sammy Davis Jr. and other performers on a USO Show trip to Vietnam where they entertained US soldiers at various bases throughout South Vietnam.

== Later career ==
Blinky's version of "God Bless the Child" appears on the album Rock Gospel: The Key to the Kingdom and her recording of "'Tain't Nobody's Biz-ness if I Do" is on the soundtrack of Lady Sings The Blues, the Billie Holiday bio-pic starring Diana Ross. Most of her solo work, save for a few singles, remained unreleased until 2019, when Real Gone Music released a double CD compilation of tracks from the Motown vaults. She can be heard live on the Motortown Revue Live! CD.

In addition, she was one of the original Cogic Singers, with Andraé Crouch, Sandra Crouch, Billy Preston, Edna Wright (lead singer of The Honey Cone), Frankie Karl, and Gloria Jones. Following her non-success with Motown, she returned to gospel music and resumed her given name.

On October 31, 2009, Blinky appeared as a backup singer, along with Sharon Jones, performing The Rolling Stones' "Exile on Main Street", as part of the rock band Phish's musical costume at their Festival 8, which was held at the Empire Polo Grounds in Indio, California, from October 30, 2009 through November 1, 2009.

In 2024 she had a cameo performance in the film Reagan, appearing with members of young Reagan's church at his baptism.
