= Brenda Holloway =

American soul singer (born 1946)

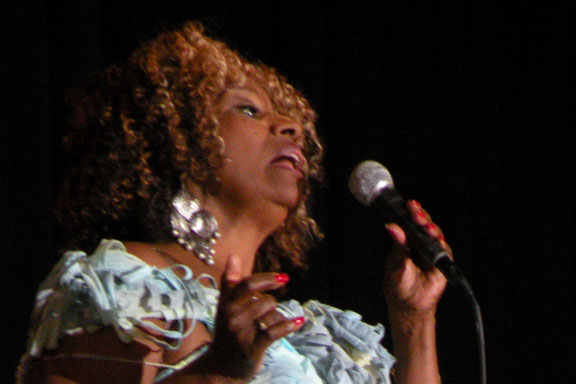
- Holloway performing at a memorial tribute for Tommy Jacquette, founder of the Watts Summer Festival, on November 18, 2009

Background information
- Born: June 21, 1946 (age 80); Atascadero, California, U.S.
- Origin: Watts, Los Angeles, California, U.S.
- Education: Jordan High School; Compton Community College
- Genres: Soul
- Occupations: Singer; songwriter
- Years active: 1962–present
- Labels: Donna; Tamla (Motown; Invictus; Birthright; Motorcity; Volt

Brenda Holloway (born June 21, 1946) is an American soul singer who was a recording artist for Motown Records during the 1960s. Her best-known recordings are the hits "Every Little Bit Hurts", "When I'm Gone", and "You've Made Me So Very Happy". The latter, which she co-wrote, was later widely popularized when it became a Top Ten hit for Blood, Sweat & Tears. She left Motown after four years, at the age of 22, and largely retired from the music industry until the 1990s, after her recordings had become popular on the British "Northern soul" scene.

== Biography ==
=== Early life and career ===
Brenda Holloway was born in Atascadero, California on June 26, 1946, the eldest of three children to Wade and Johnnie Mae (Fossett) Holloway. In 1948, she and her infant brother, Wade, Jr., moved with their parents to the Watts section of Los Angeles, where her sister, Patrice, was born in 1951. Brenda took up violin, flute and piano and sang in her church choir, as well as developing a love of classical music. At the age of 14, she began working on demonstration records and singing backup for Los Angeles-based R&B acts, and with the young Patrice.

In 1962, Brenda made her recording debut with the single "Hey Fool", released on the small Donna record label. That same year, at the age of 16, she recorded the first version of Ed Cobb's ballad "Every Little Bit Hurts", released as a single by Del-Fi Records. She also recorded duets with Hal Davis for the Minasa and Snap labels, and worked with other local recording artists. After graduating from Jordan High School, Holloway also studied music at Compton Community College. In late 1963, she was invited by Davis to a deejay's party which Motown CEO Berry Gordy Jr. was attending, and lip-synced to Mary Wells' hit "You Beat Me to the Punch". Gordy was impressed by Holloway's looks, and subsequently by her vocal power, and opted to sign her to Motown. Holloway was 17 years old at the time, and was Motown's first West Coast signing.

=== The Motown years ===
After signing with Motown's Tamla division, Holloway was given the option either to move to Detroit to record at Motown's Hitsville studios or stay in Los Angeles where Motown began hiring West Coast staffers. Holloway chose to stay in Los Angeles for the time being, and her early Motown records were produced there by Hal Davis and Marc Gordon. Holloway's first recording was "Every Little Bit Hurts", a song she had recorded two years earlier while working as a session musician. Holloway was reluctant to record the song, and later said she was upset during the sessions; several takes were recorded before producers felt that Holloway had hit her mark. Released in April 1964, three months before Holloway's eighteenth birthday, the song peaked at number 13 on the Billboard Hot 100, winning her a spot on Motown's Motortown Revue. She was regarded as a highly talented singer. According to one biographical article,

Holloway's vocal style was very relaxed, yet she was able to create tension and exercise control. She was masterful in her ability to produce warm, rich timbres. With innovative articulation, a deft control of dynamics, and a flair for dramatic performances, Holloway was a singer's singer.

Later in 1964, Holloway won a spot on Dick Clark's "Caravan of Stars" tour on the condition that then-struggling Motown girl group The Supremes join them. During the tour, the Supremes' star rose following the release of "Where Did Our Love Go". Motown issued Holloway's debut album, Every Little Bit Hurts, and released the modestly successful ballad, "I'll Always Love You", which reached number 60 on the pop chart.

When Mary Wells, who was Motown's first solo hit-maker, left the label, Motown began billing Holloway as the next female solo star and soon had Holloway recording several songs originally intended for Wells, including her next top 40 single, "When I'm Gone", which like many of Wells' hit singles, had been composed by Smokey Robinson. This time, Holloway recorded the song in Detroit. Released in early 1965, the song reached number 25 on the Hot 100 and number 13 on the R&B chart.

Motown then issued her version of a song that had originally been recorded by Wells, "Operator". The song only produced a modest showing and Holloway began dealing with issues with the label. Holloway was one of the few Motown artists not to attend the label's grooming school and was sometimes chastised by some of Motown's staff, including Gordy and Robinson, for performing and dressing "too much like Tina Turner". Some of the Detroit staff regarded her as temperamental and a "troublemaker", and the company increasingly focused attention on its most successful acts, notably the Supremes. A follow-up album, to have been called Hurtin' and Cryin', was scrapped by the label, and Holloway began to consider that she was being disregarded by the company, perhaps in part because she was not based in Detroit. However, she gained an opening spot on The Beatles' US tour later in 1965, a repeat of the group having Mary Wells open for them on their UK tour earlier that year.

Unlike Wells and Jackie DeShannon, who also opened for The Beatles, Holloway's performances as an opening act were taped and recorded when The Beatles held their landmark Shea Stadium show on August 15 of that year. Holloway's successes led to her being an in-demand television celebrity.

In early 1967, Tamla released "Just Look What You've Done", which produced Holloway's best chart showing in two years, reaching number 69 on the pop chart and number 21 on the R&B chart. Later in 1967, the label finally issued a Holloway composition, "You've Made Me So Very Happy", which she co-wrote with her sister Patrice. Berry Gordy was allowed to change a few notes on the musical composition, giving him a songwriting credit together with the record's producer, Frank Wilson. This led to Holloway's third top-40 pop single, with the song reaching number 39 on the Hot 100 and number 40 on the R&B chart. Later in 1967, Brenda (again with sister Patrice) wrote the song "Bah Bah Bah" which was recorded by Diana Ross and the Supremes and included on their "Reflections" LP.

Her second album, The Artistry of Brenda Holloway, was released in 1968. However, midway through a recording session with Smokey Robinson in Detroit, she left the studio and returned to Los Angeles. Motown's PR later released a statement on Holloway's departure, saying she had left to "sing for God", but her real reasons were her disillusionment with Motown and with her management, and her fear of being drawn into a lifestyle which conflicted with her religious convictions.

In 1969, Holloway sued Gordy for monetary reasons stemming from the success of Blood, Sweat & Tears' cover version of her single, "You've Made Me So Very Happy", which the group had taken to number 2 on the US pop chart that year. Holloway eventually won her case.

=== Later years ===
Brenda Holloway recorded for Holland, Dozier and Holland's labels Invictus and Music Merchant in the late 1960s and early 1970s. With her sister Patrice, she also continued session work into the 1970s, including several sessions with British rock singer Joe Cocker. She married a preacher, Albert Davis, in Los Angeles in 1969, and the couple had four children, Beoir, Unita, Christy and Dontese.

In 1980, Holloway released a gospel album for Birthright Records, Brand New!, that went unnoticed. After several unhappy years, she and Albert Davis divorced in the mid-1980s. Her records remained popular on Britain's Northern soul club circuit, and many tracks were reissued on compilation CDs. In 1987, Holloway returned to a secular singing career, recording for producer Ian Levine's UK label Motorcity Records, which recorded material featuring former Motown acts. Three years later, Holloway issued the album All It Takes. She recorded the song "On The Rebound" as a duet with Jimmy Ruffin 1989, then on the album All It Takes, two years later, in 1991.

However, Holloway only returned to a performing career after the death of her old Motown friend Mary Wells in 1992, when she restarted performing in the Los Angeles area and in Britain, often in tandem with Brenton Wood, and on one occasion with Blood, Sweat & Tears. She also spoke at schools, and at UCLA in 1993. In 1999, she released the album It's A Woman's World for the Volt label.

Her last album, My Love is Your Love, was released in 2003. Several of Holloway's classic recordings, including "Every Little Bit Hurts", "When I'm Gone" and "You've Made Me So Very Happy" were covered by a variety of acts over the years. In 2003, Vivian Green played Holloway in a cameo appearance on the TV show, American Dreams, where she sang "Every Little Bit Hurts," and, in 2005, Alicia Keys famously covered "Every Little Bit Hurts" for her Unplugged special. In 2011, Holloway recorded a duet with Cliff Richard on his Soulicious album, but did not perform with Richard on his accompanying concert tour in Britain.

In 1999, Holloway was honored with the Rhythm & Blues Foundation's prestigious Pioneer Award.

In 2005, she appeared on the PBS concert TV special My Music: Salute to Early Motown.

== Discography ==
=== Studio albums ===
- Every Little Bit Hurts (1964)
- The Artistry of Brenda Holloway (1968)
- Brand New! (1980)
- All It Takes (1990)
- It's a Woman's World (1999)
- My Love Is Your Love (2CD, 2003)

=== Live album ===
- Together... (Live) (2000)

=== Compilations ===
- 20th Century Masters (2003)
- Anthology (Tamla-Motown) (2005)

=== Singles ===
List of singles as a lead artist, with selected chart positions, sales figures and certifications
Title	Year	Chart positions			Album
Title	Year	US	US R&B /HH	CAN	Album
"Hey Fool" (with Jess Harris)	1962	—	—	—	Non-album single
"Game Of Love"	1962	—	—	—	Non-album single
"I'll Give My Life"	1962	—	—	—	Non-album single
"You're My Pride and Joy"	1963	—	—	—	Non-album single
"I Never Knew You Looked So Good Until I Quit You" (with Jess Harris)	1963	—	—	—	Non-album single
"It's You" (with Hal Davis)	1963	—	—	—	Non-album single
"I Ain't Gonna Take You Back" (Brenda Holloway and the Carrolls)	1964	—	—	—	Non-album single
"Every Little Bit Hurts"	1964	13	3	—	Every Little Bit Hurts
"I'll Always Love You"	1964	60	—	—	The Artistry of Brenda Holloway
"When I'm Gone"	1965	25	12	43	The Artistry of Brenda Holloway
"Operator"	1965	78	36	14	The Artistry of Brenda Holloway
"You Can Cry on My Shoulder"	1965	116	—	—	The Artistry of Brenda Holloway
"Together 'Til the End of Time"	1966	125	—	—	The Artistry of Brenda Holloway
"Hurt a Little Everyday"	1966	—	—	—	The Artistry of Brenda Holloway
"Just Look What You've Done"	1967	69	21	—	The Artistry of Brenda Holloway
"You've Made Me So Very Happy"	1967	39	40	48	The Artistry of Brenda Holloway
"Let Love Grow"	1972	—	—	—	Non-album single
"Give Me a Little Inspiration"	1988	—	—	—	All It Takes
"On the Rebound" (with Jimmy Ruffin)	1988	—	—	—	All It Takes
"Hot and Cold"	1991	—	—	—	All It Takes
"Same Page" (with Rags Moody III)	2018	—	—	—	Non-album single
"—" denotes releases that did not chart or were not released in that territory.
