= Edwin Starr =

American musician (1942–2003)

Background information
- Born: Charles Edwin Hatcher; January 21, 1942; Nashville, Tennessee, U.S.
- Died: April 2, 2003 (aged 61) Chilwell, Nottinghamshire, England
- Genres: Soul; R&B; funk; disco; psychedelic soul
- Occupations: Singer, songwriter
- Years active: 1962–2003
- Labels: Ric-Tic; Motown; 20th Century; Motorcity
- Website: edwinstarr.info

Charles Edwin Hatcher (January 21, 1942 – April 2, 2003), known by his stage name Edwin Starr, was an American singer and songwriter. He is best remembered for his Norman Whitfield-produced Motown singles of the 1970s, most notably the number-one hit "War".

Born in Nashville and raised in Cleveland, he later lived in Detroit while singing for Ric-Tic and Motown Records. He was backed by the band that became known as "Black Merda". Hawkins and Veasey of the group played on most of his early hits on the Ric Tic Label. Starr's songs "Twenty-Five Miles" and "Stop the War Now" were also major successes, in 1969 and 1971 respectively. In the 1970s Starr moved to England, where he continued to produce music and resided until his death.

== Early life ==
Charles Edwin Hatcher was born in Nashville, Tennessee, on January 21, 1942. He and his cousins, soul singers Roger and Willie Hatcher, moved to Cleveland, Ohio, where they were raised.

In 1957, Hatcher formed a doo-wop group, the Future Tones, and began his singing career. However, after just one single he was called up for military service in the United States Army for three years, where he was posted to Europe. Following the end of his service he decided to make music his career, and joined the musical group of Bill Doggett. Hatcher adopted the name Edwin Starr at the suggestion of Doggett's manager Don Briggs, and made his solo recording debut in 1965 for the Detroit record company Ric-Tic.

== Career ==
The song that launched his career was "Agent Double-O-Soul" (1965), a reference to the James Bond films, already popular at the time. Other early hits included "Headline News", "Back Street", and "Stop Her on Sight (S.O.S.)". (These first four hits were all co-written by Starr as "C. Hatcher".) While at Ric-Tic, as Edwin Starr he wrote the song "Oh, How Happy", a number 12 Billboard Hot 100 hit in 1966 for The Shades of Blue (he would go on to release a version of the song with Blinky in 1969) and sang lead for the Holidays on their number 12 R&B hit, "I'll Love You Forever". At Motown he recorded a string of singles before enjoying international success with "Twenty-Five Miles", which he co-wrote with producers Johnny Bristol and Harvey Fuqua. It peaked at number 6 in both the Hot 100 and R&B Charts in 1969.

It was when Motown's Berry Gordy became frustrated with smaller labels like Ric-Tic stealing some of the success of his company that he bought out the label. Many of Starr's Ric-Tic songs (subsequently owned by Motown) like "Back Street" and "Headline News" became favored northern soul classics. His early Ric-Tic hit "Stop Her on Sight (S.O.S.)", was reissued in Britain (with "Headline News" as its B-side) in 1968, and it performed better than the original release on the UK chart, surpassing the original number 35 and peaking at number 11. His 1970 song "Time" also helped to establish him as a prominent artist on the northern soul scene.

The biggest hit of Starr's career, which cemented his reputation, was the Vietnam War protest song "War" (1970). Starr's intense vocals transformed a Temptations album track into a number one chart success, which spent three weeks in the top position on the U.S. Billboard charts, an anthem for the antiwar movement and a cultural milestone that continues to resound in movie soundtracks and hip-hop music samples. It sold over three million copies, and was awarded a gold disc. "War" appeared on both Starr's War & Peace album and its follow-up, Involved, produced by Norman Whitfield. Involved also featured another song of similar construction titled "Stop the War Now", which was a minor hit in its own right. Music critic Robert Christgau called the latter album "Norman Whitfield's peak production". His backing singers during this time were Total Concept Unlimited, who later became Rose Royce.

"Starr is more naturally strident than any of the Temptations, which suits both 'War,' a song he simply takes away from them, and 'Stop the War,' Barrett Strong's most strident protest yet."

— The Best of the Staples Singers review in Christgau's Record Guide: Rock Albums of the Seventies (1981)

Starr continued to record, most notably the song "Hell Up in Harlem" for the 1974 film Hell Up in Harlem, which was the sequel to Black Caesar, an earlier hit with a soundtrack by James Brown. In 1979, Starr reappeared on the charts with a pair of disco hits, "(Eye-to-Eye) Contact" and "H.A.P.P.Y. Radio". "Contact" was the more successful of the two, peaking at number 65 on the US pop chart, number 13 on the R&B chart, number 1 on the dance chart, and number 6 on the UK singles chart. "H.A.P.P.Y. Radio" was also a top ten hit in the UK, reaching number 9 on the chart in mid-1979. By now, he had joined the well-established disco boom and had further singles on 20th Century Records. Over the years, he released tracks on a variety of labels, including Avatar, Calibre, 10 Records, Motown (a return to his former label for a 1989 remix of "25 Miles"), Streetwave (where he recorded 1984's "Marvin", a tribute to Marvin Gaye) and Hippodrome (a division of Peter Stringfellow's Hippodrome nightclub). His Starr café empire still enjoys success in and around Essex.

In 1985, Starr released "It Ain't Fair". Despite garnering the attention of many in the soul and dance clubs, it fell short of becoming a major hit (managing number 56 on the UK Chart). "It Ain't Fair", along with several other singles released around the same time, appeared on Starr's Through the Grapevine album, which was not released until 1990. Starr appeared on the charity number one single "Let It Be" by Ferry Aid in 1987. Later that year, Starr teamed up with the Stock, Aitken and Waterman (SAW) production company for the club hit, "Whatever Makes Our Love Grow". Starr expressed dissatisfaction with the process of making the record, complaining that the producers treated him as an amateur.

In 1989, a number 17 UK hit by the Cookie Crew called "Got to Keep On" sampled a portion of "25 Miles". This track was then featured on a 1990 dance medley made for the BRIT Awards, which made number 2 in the UK Singles Chart. A club mix of various artists, it included the previous years remix of "25 Miles".

In 1989, Starr also joined Ian Levine's Motorcity Records, releasing six singles and the album Where Is the Sound, as well as co-writing several songs for other artists on the label. Starr resurfaced briefly in 2000 to team up with the UK band Utah Saints to record a new version of "Funky Music Sho' 'Nuff Turns Me On". He appeared again in 2002 to record a song with the British musician Jools Holland, singing "Snowflake Boogie" on Holland's compact disc More Friends; and to record another track with Utah Saints, a so-far-unreleased version of his number one hit "War"—his last recording.

In 1995, Starr featured in Blue Juice, a 1995 British drama film as a soul singer named Ossie Sands. The songs featured were recorded by Starr for the film. The film has the added attraction of being possibly the first film to include northern soul as a sub-plot.

In late 2002, Edwin Starr appeared with many R&B stars on the "Rhythm, Love, and Soul" edition of the PBS series American Soundtrack. His performance of "25 Miles" was included on the accompanying live album that was released in 2004.

== Personal life and death ==
Starr remained a hero on England's northern soul circuit and moved to England in 1983, continuing to live there for the remainder of his life. He based himself in the Midlands, living for many years at Pooley Hall at Polesworth, Warwickshire, before moving to Bramcote in Nottinghamshire.

Starr died on April 2, 2003, from a heart attack at his Nottinghamshire home. He was 61. He is buried at Wilford Hill Cemetery in Nottingham. He was survived by his long-term partner Jean and by his son and daughter from earlier relationships.

== Honours ==
Edwin Starr was inducted into the inaugural class of the Official Rhythm & Blues Hall of Fame at Cleveland State University in August 2013.

Starr was inducted into the Michigan Rock and Roll Legends Hall of Fame in 2017.

Starr is one of the subjects of a mural in Beeston, Nottingham, which is close to where he lived later in life.

== Discography ==
=== Albums ===
List of albums, with selected chart positions
Title	Year	Peak chart positions		
Title	Year	AUS	US	US R&B
Soul Master	1968	–	—	—
25 Miles	1969	–	73	9
Just We Two (with Blinky)	1969	–	–	–
War & Peace	1970	–	52	9
Involved	1971	–	178	45
Hell Up in Harlem (soundtrack)	1974	–	–	–
Free to Be Myself	1975	–	–	43
Afternoon Sunshine [UK] Edwin Starr [US]	1977	–	–	–
Clean	1978	–	80	22
Happy Radio	1979	83	115	44
Stronger than You Think I Am	1980	–	–	–
For Sale	1983	–	–	–
Through the Grapevine (includes several of his mid-1980s singles)	1990	–	–	–
You Can Have It	1991	–	–	–
Where Is the Sound	1991	–	–	–
"–" denotes releases that did not chart.

=== Singles ===
Year	Single	Chart positions					Certifications
Year	Single	US Pop	US R&B	US Dance	AUS	UK	Certifications
1965	"Agent Double-O-Soul"	21	8	–	–	–	
1965	"Back Street"	95	33	–	–	–	
1966	"Stop Her on Sight (S.O.S.)"	48	9	–	–	35	
1966	"I'll Love You Forever" (with the Holidays)	63	7	–	–	–	
1966	"Headline News"	84	–	–	–	39	
1967	"Girls Are Getting Prettier"	–	–	–	–	–	
1967	"You're My Mellow"	–	–	–	–	–	
1967	"I Want My Baby Back"	120	–	–	–	–	
1968	"I Am the Man for You Baby"	112	45	–	–	–	
1968	"Way Over There"	–	–	–	–	–	
1968	"Stop Her on Sight (S.O.S.)" / "Headline News" (reissue)	–	–	–	–	11	
1969	"Twenty-Five Miles"	6	6	–	–	36	
1969	"I'm Still a Struggling Man"	80	27	–	–	–	
1969	"Oh How Happy" (as Blinky & Edwin Starr)	92	–	–	–	–	
1970	"Time"	117	39	–	–	–	
1970	"War"	1	3	–	37	3	BPI: Silver
1970	"Stop the War Now"	26	5	–	–	33	
1971	"Funky Music Sho' 'Nuff Turns Me On"	64	6	–	–	–	
1972	"Who Is the Leader of the People"	–	–	–	–	–	
1973	"There You Go"	80	12	–	–	–	
1973	"You've Got My Soul on Fire"	–	40	–	–	–	
1974	"Ain't It Hell Up in Harlem"	110	–	–	–	–	
1974	"Big Papa"	–	–	–	–	–	
1974	"Who's Right or Wrong"	–	–	–	–	–	
1975	"Pain"	–	25	–	–	–	
1975	"Stay with Me"	–	51	–	–	–	
1975	"Abyssinia Jones"	98	25	–	–	–	
1976	"Accident"	–	–	–	–	–	
1977	"I Just Wanna Do My Thing"	–	94	28	–	–	
1978	"I'm So into You"	–	–	–	–	–	
1979	"Contact"	65	13	1	37	6	BPI: Silver
1979	"H.A.P.P.Y. Radio"	79	28	7	54	9	
1979	"It's Called the Rock"	–	–	–	–	–	
1979	"Tell a Star"	–	–	–	–	–	
1980	"Stronger"	–	–	–	–	–	
1980	"Boop Boop"	–	–	–	–	–	
1980	"Get Up, Whirlpool"	–	–	–	–	–	
1981	"Sweet"	–	–	–	–	–	
1983	"I Wanna Take You Home"	–	–	–	–	–	
1983	"Smooth"	–	–	–	–	90	
1984	"Marvin"	–	–	–	–	89	
1985	"It Ain't Fair"	–	–	–	–	56	
1985	"Missiles"	–	–	–	–	–	
1986	"Grapevine"	–	–	–	–	83	
1986	"Soul Singer"	–	–	–	–	–	
1987	"Whatever Makes Our Love Grow"	–	–	–	–	98	
1988	"Long Line of Lovers"	–	–	–	–	–	
1989	"25 Miles '89"	–	–	–	–	82	
1990	"She's The One"	–	–	–	–	–	
1990	"Ain't No Stopping Us Now" (with David Saylor)	–	–	–	–	–	
1992	"Darling Darling Baby"	–	–	–	–	–	
1993	"War" (as Edwin Starr and Shadow)	–	–	–	–	69	
1994	"Can't Stop Thinking About You"	–	–	–	–	–	
"–" denotes releases that did not chart.
