= Al's Big Deal – Unclaimed Freight =

Compilation album by Al Kooper
- Released: 1975
- Genre: Rock
- Length: 87:39
- Label: Columbia

Professional ratings
Review scores
Source	Rating
AllMusic	4/5 stars

Al's Big Deal – Unclaimed Freight is a compilation album by American musician Al Kooper. It was released as a double-LP in 1975.

== Background ==
After seven years in the music industry, Columbia Records released a retrospective compilation of Kooper's music from 1968-1975. The two-disc set includes five songs from the first Blood, Sweat and Tears album, Child Is Father to the Man; two from Super Session with Mike Bloomfield and Stephen Stills; a cut from Bob Dylan's New Morning album which Kooper produced and played piano; two cuts from The Live Adventures of Mike Bloomfield and Al Kooper; a long jam with guitarist Shuggie Otis from Kooper Session and six titles from four of his first six solo albums. It does not include any cuts from his 1966 album with The Blues Project. The album was released in the midst of Kooper's involvement with Lynyrd Skynyrd, during which time he did no solo recording. This album was Kooper's last Columbia release until Championship Wrestling in 1982.

== Track listing ==
1. "I Can't Quit Her" (Al Kooper, Bob Brass, Irwin Levine) – 3:37
2. "I Love You More Than You'll Ever Know" (Kooper) – 5:56
3. "My Days Are Numbered" (Kooper) – 3:17
4. "Without Her" (Harry Nilsson) – 2:41
5. "So Much Love/Underture" (Gerry Goffin, Carole King) – 4:42
6. "Albert's Shuffle" (Kooper, Mike Bloomfield) – 6:51
7. "Season of the Witch" (Donovan Leitch) – 11:02
8. "If Dogs Run Free" (Bob Dylan) – 3:38
9. "The 59th Street Bridge Song (Feelin' Groovy)" (Paul Simon) – 5:31
10. "The Weight" (Robbie Robertson) – 3:56
11. "Bury My Body" (Traditional, arranged by Kooper) – 8:50
12. "Jolie" (Kooper) – 3:47
13. "I Stand Alone" (Kooper) – 3:37
14. "Brand New Day" (Kooper) – 5:08
15. "Sam Stone" (John Prine) – 4:41
16. "New York City (You're a Woman)" (Kooper) – 5:14
17. "I Got a Woman" (Ray Charles, Renald Richard) – 5:11

An alternate listing is presented on the 1989 CD release, with only 14 tracks, in different order and with the notable change of "I Got A Woman" into "The Heart Is a Lonely Hunter", which was released on the 1982 album Championship Wrestling. This release is the same as can be found on streaming services Spotify and Apple Music.

1. "New York City (You're a Woman)" - 5:10
2. "I Can't Quit Her" - 3:27
3. "I Stand Alone" - 3:42
4. "Brand New Day" - 5:09
5. "The Heart Is a Lonely Hunter" - 4:19
6. "Sam Stone" - 4:40
7. "Jolie" - 3:45
8. "I Love You More Than You'll Ever Know" - 5:54
9. "Bury My Body" - 8:46
10. "Albert's Shuffle" - 6:54
11. "The Weight" - 4:03
12. "The 59th Street Bridge Song (Feelin' Groovy) - Live at Bill Graham's Fillmore Auditorium, San Francisco, CA - September 1968" - 5:37
13. "If Dogs Run Free" - 3:37
14. "Season of the Witch" - 11:09

== Notes ==
The 1989 single-CD version of the album omitted the Blood, Sweat and Tears tracks "My Days Are Numbered", "Without Her", "So Much Love/Underture" and the solo track "I Got a Woman", and added a remixed version of "The Heart Is a Lonely Hunter" from his 1982 album Championship Wrestling. It also contained a completely different track order from the original LP.

== Personnel ==
- Patti Austin - Background vocals
- Barry Bailey - Electric guitar
- Michael Bloomfield - Electric Guitar
- The Blossoms - Background vocals
- Randy Brecker - Flugelhorn, Trumpet
- Harvey Brooks - Bass
- Kenny Buttrey - Drums
- Charles Calello - Horn Arrangements, String Arrangements
- Fred Catero - Engineer
- J.R. Cobb - Electric Guitar
- Bobby Colomby - Drums, Background vocals
- Ron Cornelius - Guitar
- Charlie Daniels - Bass, Guitar
- Dean Daughtry - Piano
- Bob Dylan - Acoustic guitar, Vocals
- Emerson-Loew - Photography
- Hugh Fielder - Liner Notes
- Jim Fielder - Bass
- Herbie Flowers - Bass
- Eileen Gilbert - Background vocals
- Paul Goddard - Bass
- Barry Goldberg - Electric piano
- Al Gorgoni - Gut-string Guitar
- Dick Halligan - Trombone
- Hilda Harris - Background vocals
- "Fast" Eddie Hoh - Drums
- John Kahn - Bass
- Steve Katz - Electric guitar
- Wells Kelly - Drums
- Jerry Kennedy - Guitar
- Al Kooper - 6-String Bass, Arranger, Guitar, Horn Synthesizer, Keyboards, Mellotron, Organ, Synthesizer Strings, Vibraphone, Vocals
- Russ Kunkel - Drums
- Tim Langford - Engineer
- Arthur Levy - Liner Notes
- Fred Lipsius - Arranger, Alto Saxophone
- Phil Macy - Engineer
- Rick Marotta - Drums
- Jim Marshall - Photography
- Charlie McCoy - Harmonica
- Rodney Mills - Engineer
- Melba Moore - Background vocals
- Wayne Moss - Guitar
- Gary Nichamin - Design, Layout Design
- Robert Nix - Drums
- Linda November - Background vocals
- Shuggie Otis - Electric Guitar
- Roger Pope - Drums
- Skip Prokop - Drums
- Don Puluse - Engineer
- Albertine Robinson - Background vocals
- Joe Scott - Horn Arrangements
- Ken Scott - unknown contributor role
- Roy Segal - Engineer
- John Simon - Piano
- Paul Simon - Vocal Harmony
- Valerie Simpson - Background vocals
- Maretha Stewart - Scat
- Stephen Stills - Electric Guitar
- Tasha Thomas - Background vocals
- Jerry Weiss - Flugelhorn, Trumpet
- Stu Woods - Bass
