= The Gaslight Cafe =

Greenwich Village coffeehouse (1958–1971)

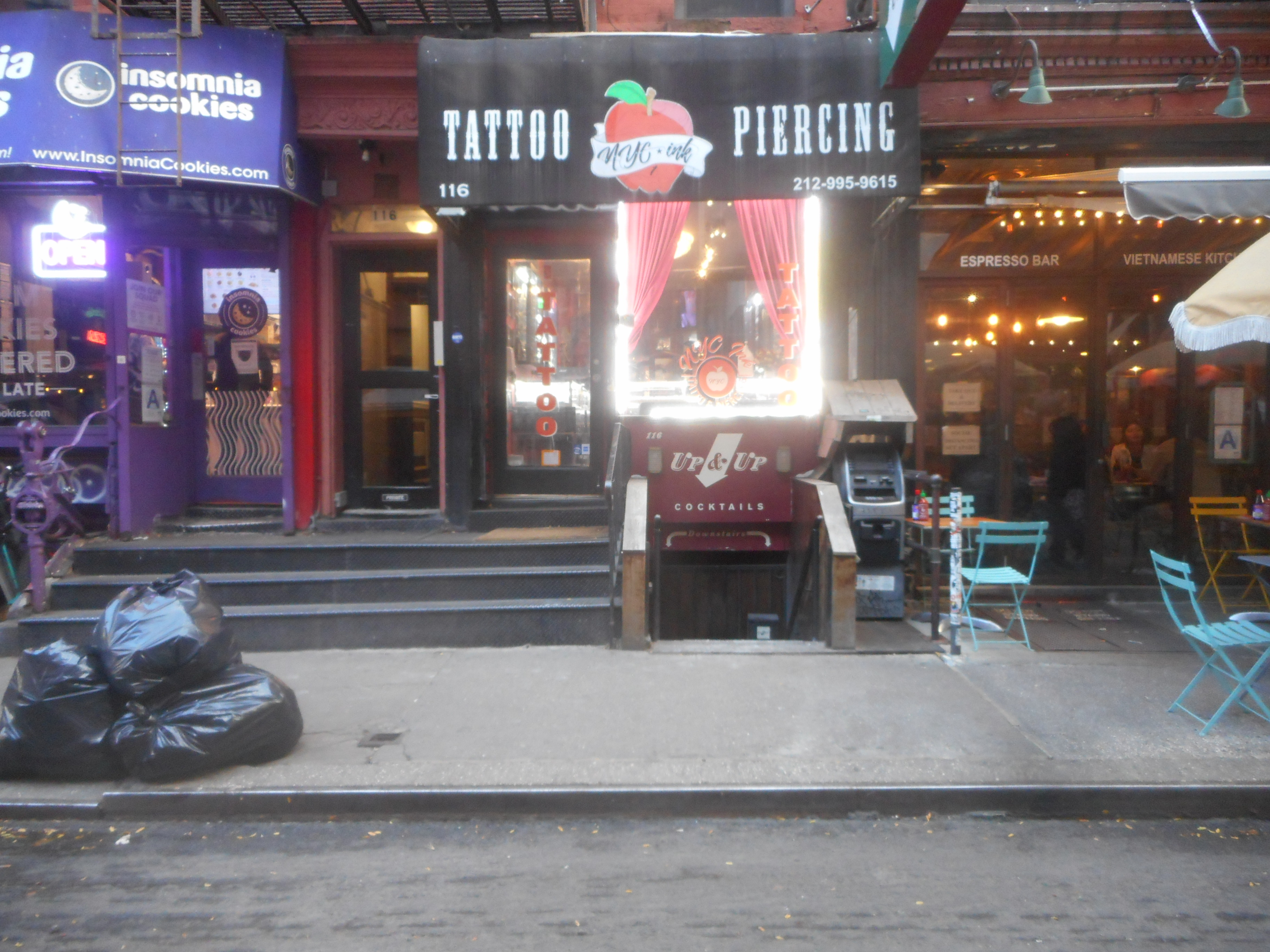
- The former site of the Gaslight Cafe as seen in November 2021.
- Interactive map of The Gaslight Cafe
- Location: 116 MacDougal Street; New York City, New York; United States
- Coordinates: 40°43′47.01″N 74°0′1.93″W
- Owner: John Mitchell; John Moyant; Sam Hood; Ed Simon
- Type: Coffeehouse
- Events: Folk music, et al.

Construction
- Opened: 1958
- Closed: 1971

The Gaslight Cafe was a coffeehouse in the Greenwich Village neighborhood of Manhattan, New York. Also called The Village Gaslight, it opened in 1958 and became a venue for folk music and other musical acts. It closed in 1971.

== History ==
The Gaslight was originally a "basket house" where unpaid performers would pass around a basket at the end of each set and hope to be paid. Opened in 1958 by John Mitchell, the Gaslight showcased beat poets Allen Ginsberg and Gregory Corso but later became a folk-music club. John Moyant bought the club in 1961. Moyant's father-in-law, Clarence Hood, and his son, Sam, managed the club through the late 1960s. Ed Simon, the owner of The Four Winds, reopened the Gaslight in 1968. The club was run by Betty Smyth, mother of Scandal lead singer Patty Smyth, and blues guitarist/performer Susan Martin until it closed in 1971.

Folk musician and actor Gil Robbins worked as the club's manager in the late 1960s.

The club was next door and down the stairs from the street-level bar, the Kettle of Fish, where many performers hung out between sets, including Bob Dylan. Also nearby was the Folklore Center, a bookstore/record store owned by Izzy Young and notable for being a musicians' gathering place and center of the New York folk-music scene. Live at The Gaslight 1962 (2005), a single CD release including ten songs from early Dylan performances at the club, was released by Columbia Records.

In the Folk Music Encyclopedia, Kristin Baggelaar and Donald Milton wrote "The Gaslight was weird then because there were air shafts up to the apartments and the windows of the Gaslight would open into the air shafts, so when people would applaud, the neighbors would get disturbed and call the police. So then the audience couldn't applaud; they had to snap their fingers instead."

Brian Fallon, the lead singer and guitarist of The Gaslight Anthem, has said that the band's name came from The Gaslight Cafe as he had heard it was one of the first places that Bob Dylan had played and liked the sound of the word and the imagery it brought about.

== Performers ==
Among those who performed at the Gaslight were Bill Cosby; Bob Dylan; Joni Mitchell (her first ever appearance in NYC, in 1966, with Chuck Mitchell); Luke Faust, a five-string banjo player and singer who sang Appalachian ballads; Len Chandler; Paul Clayton; Luke Askew; Wavy Gravy; Joan Rivers; Bruce Springsteen. 1964–1966 saw many early performances by Richie Havens, Jose Feliciano, Tom Paxton, Phil Ochs, Eddie Mottau, Eric Andersen, John Herald, Ralph Rinzler, The Greenbriar Boys, Ramblin' Jack Elliott, Carolyn Hester, Elizabeth Cotten and Dave Van Ronk. The first public "electric" appearance of The Blues Project (with Danny Kalb) took place at the club. Mississippi John Hurt and Jesse Fuller ("Lone Cat") played there. Jimi Hendrix and Eric Clapton sat in together for a week at the Gaslight with John Hammond Jr. An array of musicians also performed at the club in the late 1960s and early 1970s, including Odetta, Son House, Mississippi Fred McDowell, Bonnie Raitt, Reverend Gary Davis, Sonny Terry & Brownie McGhee, Big Mama Thornton, Link Wray, Mimi Fariña, jazz musician Charles Mingus, Happy Traum and Artie Traum, Doug Kershaw, Bob Neuwirth, David Bromberg, David Buskin, Janis Siegel (who later joined The Manhattan Transfer), and others.

== In popular culture ==
- Bobbie Ann Mason in her 1999 memoir Clear Springs writes of hearing "beatnik poetry" at the Gaslight in the early 1960s.
- Mad Men: "Babylon" (6th episode of the first season), created by Matthew Weiner (2007)
- Inside Llewyn Davis (2013)
- Live at The Gaslight 1962: live album by Bob Dylan
- Documentary on the musicians and history made at the Gaslight during its prime: Greenwich Village: Music That Defined a Generation
- The Marvelous Mrs. Maisel: The Gaslight is Midge Maisel's main venue for stand-up comedy acts.
- Dave Van Ronk's song "Gaslight Rag"
- David Bowie's song "(You Will) Set the World on Fire" on The Next Day album.
- A Complete Unknown (2024)

== See also ==
- Cafe Wha?
- Cafe Au Go Go
- Gerde's Folk City
- The Bitter End
