= Projections (The Blues Project album) =

Studio album by the Blues Project
- Released: November 1966
- Genre: Blues rock, psychedelic rock
- Length: 49:24
- Label: Verve/Folkways
- Producer: Tom Wilson; Billy James on "Flute Thing" and "Fly Away"

The Blues Project chronology
Live at the Cafe Au Go Go (1966)	Projections (1966)	Live at Town Hall (1967)

Singles from Projections
- 1. "I Can't Keep From Crying" Released: November 1966; 2. "Steve's Song" Released: February 1967

Professional ratings
Review scores
Source	Rating
Allmusic	4.5/5 stars

Projections is the second album by the American blues rock band the Blues Project. Produced by Tom Wilson and released by Verve/Folkways in November 1966, the album was their first studio release and examined a more rock-based sound. Jim Marshall was credited as the photographer of the album cover.

Soon after the release of this album, Al Kooper left the band in the spring of 1967 to form Blood, Sweat & Tears.

== Chart performance ==
The album peaked at No. 52 on the Billboard Top LPs, during a thirty six-week run on the chart. On Cashbox the album peaked at No. 28 during a twenty two-week stay on the chart.

== Recording ==
Keyboardist and vocalist Al Kooper was the most prominent member of the band, having recently played on Bob Dylan's seminal album Highway 61 Revisited. However, Projections was very much a group effort, developing the band's unique style that drew upon blues, jazz, folk, soul, and psychedelic influences.

According to Danny Kalb, the record company was not interested in the band's artistic merit and "just wanted to make a few bucks". The band was disappointed by this lack of creative input and did not see the album cover or hear the mix until the record was released. Kooper believes the band's albums were poorly recorded, saying that Projections "has a lot of weird echo on it, and that was our best recording."

== Song Notes ==
- Kooper's energetic arrangement of "I Can't Keep From Crying" incorporated psychedelic and gospel elements.
- "Steve's Song", the first song ever written by singer/guitarist Steve Katz, was intended to be titled "September Fifth", but a miscommunication between MGM Records and the band's manager resulted in the generic title used for the release. It features a baroque introduction featuring flute playing from Andy Kulberg, and Kooper on the Ondioline.
- Comparing "You Can’t Catch Me" as recorded with Chuck Berry's original lyrics reveals that singer/guitarist Danny Kalb initially skips the second stanza. He then loses his place after the line, "Sweetest little thing I ever seen…," and mumbles a bit before picking up the remaining lyrics in the stanza. There's a bit of vamping after that, after which the band goes back to the second stanza to finish the song.
- "Two Trains Running" was Danny Kalb's tribute to Muddy Waters, one of the band's biggest influences. This 11-minute rendition is significantly different from the original version and was developed as the band played it live. On the Projections version, one of Kalb's guitar strings went out of tune near the song's end; Kalb instinctively tuned it back up without the band's stopping, creating a memorable moment.
- "Wake Me, Shake Me" came from a traditional gospel song and was a vehicle for improvisation that the band often used to close their live shows.
- Kooper's jazz-rock instrumental "Flute Thing" features a prominent flute lick played by Kulberg, as well as solos from Kooper, Kalb, and drummer Roy Blumenfeld. It was later sampled by Beastie Boys on their Ill Communication album, in the song "Flute Loop".

== Track listing ==
Side one

1. "I Can't Keep From Crying" (Arranged by Al Kooper) – 4:25
2. "Steve's Song" (Steve Katz) – 4:55
3. "You Can't Catch Me" (Chuck Berry) – 4:14
4. "Two Trains Running" (McKinley Morganfield) – 11:20

Side two

1. "Wake Me, Shake Me" (Arranged by Kooper) – 5:15
2. "Cheryl's Going Home" (Bob Lind) – 2:35
3. "Flute Thing" (Kooper) – 5:58
4. "Caress Me Baby" (Jimmy Reed) – 7:12
5. "Fly Away" (Kooper) – 3:30

== Personnel ==
=== Musicians ===
- Danny Kalb – guitar, vocals
- Al Kooper – keyboards, vocals
- Steve Katz – guitar, harmonica, vocals; bass (track 7)
- Andy Kulberg – bass, flute
- Roy Blumenfeld – drums

=== Technical ===
- Tom Wilson – producer
- Billy James (credited as "Marcus James" for contractual reasons) – producer (tracks 7,9)
- Val Valentin – engineer
- Ken Kendall – design
- Jim Marshall – photography

== Charts ==
Chart (1966)	Peak position
US Billboard Top LPs	52
US Cashbox Top 100 Albums	28
