= Steven Keene =

American singer, songwriter, and musician

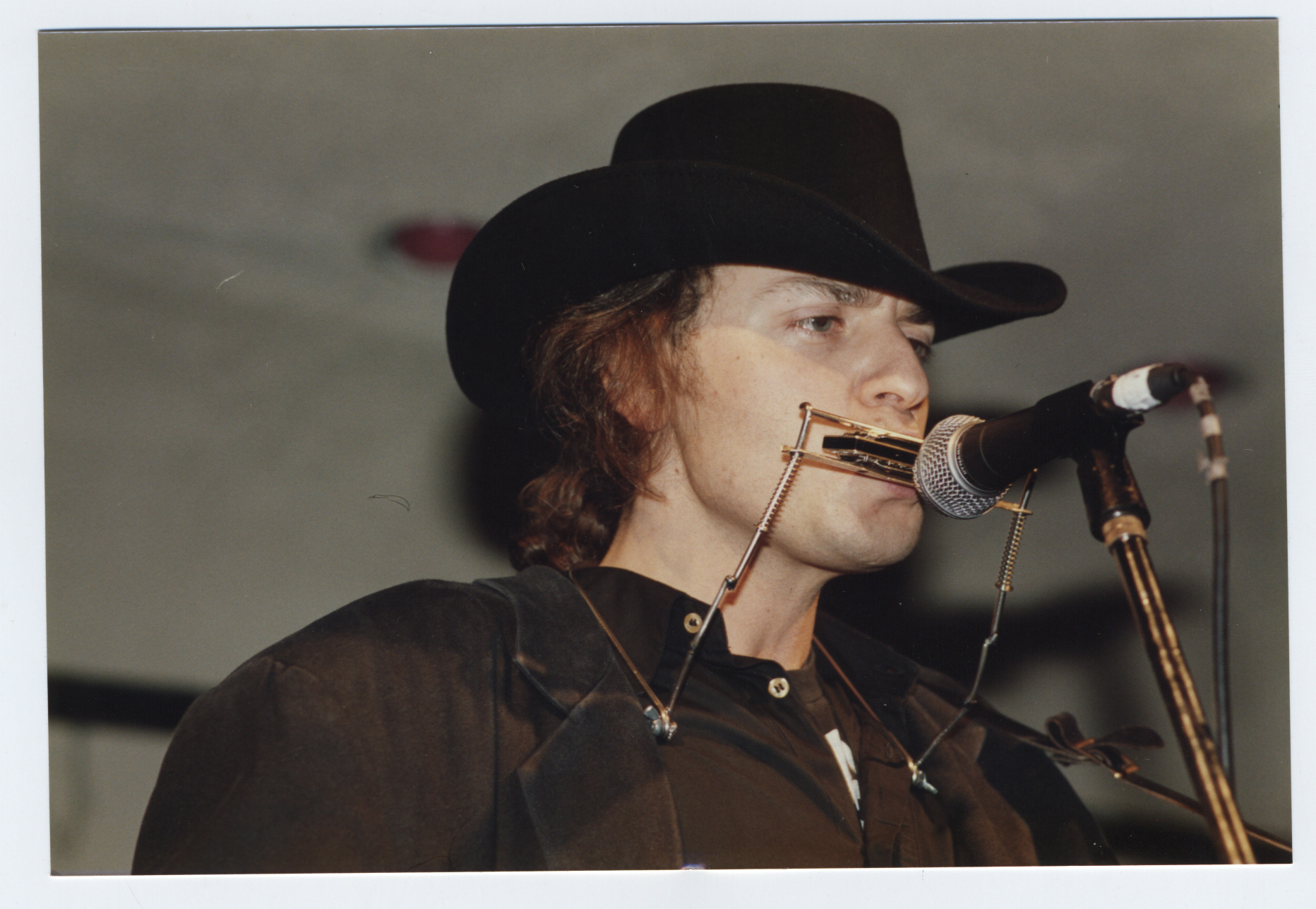
- Keene performing in New York City

Background information
- Born: June 24, 1971 (age 53); Brooklyn, New York
- Genres: Folk; Country; Americana; Singer-songwriter
- Years active: 1990–present
- Labels: Moo Records; BMG Ariola; ONErpm
- Website: stevenkeene.com

Steven Keene is a singer, songwriter and musician from New York City.

== Early life ==
Steven was born and grew up in Brooklyn, New York. As a child he learned show business while traveling during the summers through the southeastern United States with his uncle Tex in a circus troupe, and playing harmonica for a juggling act when he was nine.

== Career ==
Having learned to play guitar, he was active on the blues scene in Austin, Texas for a time while working at a lumber mill to support himself. He moved to Memphis, Tennessee and formed a band there, then moved to New York City, where he became active in the Greenwich Village folk music scene, his skillful vocals even winning him several Bob Dylan impersonator contests.

In 1990, he released his first album, Keene On Dylan, with Bob Dylan band members Howie Wyeth and Rob Stoner (from the Desire album and Rolling Thunder Revue tour).

In 1995, now signed to Moo Records, he released his second album, No Alternative. This one featured Bob Dylan band members Tony Garnier, John Jackson, and Bucky Baxter. It also included a collaboration with Danny Kalb on the track "Only Homeless." BMG distributed the album in Europe, he toured there, and a video for the single "Far Better Friend than Lover" appeared on MTV Europe.

In 2001, Steven released the album Set Clock on Moo Records. He appeared on Vin Scelsa’s "Idiot's Delight" radio show and toured to promote the album.

In 2003 his protest song "How Much Blood's in a Barrel?" song received extensive airplay in the US and was picked up and released by ZYX Music in Europe. Together with two other protest songs it was released on a three-song Maxi CD that was distributed throughout Europe by Ariola Records.

In 2019, Steven signed with ONErpm and on January 10, 2020, released the album It Is What It Is. On October 14, 2019 Americana Highways premiered the single "Don't Blame It On the Alcohol." The singles "By Your Side" (November 2019), "She Used Me, I Used Her..." and "It Is What It Is" followed.

== Discography ==
Song or Album	Year	Label
Keene on Dylan	1990	Moo Records
Steven Keene	1994	Moo Records
No Alternative	1995	Moo Records
Set Clock	2001	Moo Records
"How Much Blood's in a Barrel?"	2003	ZYX Music
Keene on Dylan Demos	2003	Moo Records
May Your Song Always Be Sung (Compilation)	2003	BMG Ariola
May Your Song Always Be Sung Vol. 3 (Compilation)	2003	BMG Ariola
"Don't Blame It on the Alcohol"	2019	ONErpm
"By Your Side"	2019	ONErpm
"She Used Me, I Used Her..."	2019	ONErpm
It Is What It Is	2020	ONErpm
