= Live at the Cafe Au Go Go =

Live album by the Blues Project
- Released: March 1966
- Recorded: November 24–27, 1965; January 1966
- Venue: Cafe Au Go Go, New York City
- Genre: Blues rock, Chicago blues
- Length: 42:01
- Label: Verve/Folkways
- Producer: Jerry Schoenbaum

The Blues Project chronology
Live at the Cafe Au Go Go (1966)	Projections (1966)

Singles from Live at The Cafe Au Go Go
- 1. "Back Door Man" Released: January 1966; 2. "Catch The Wind" Released: May 1966; 3. "Goin' Down Louisiana" Released: June 1966; 4. "The Way My Baby Walks" Released: November 1966

Professional ratings
Review scores
Source	Rating
Allmusic	3.5/5 stars

Live at the Cafe Au Go Go is the debut album by the American band the Blues Project, recorded live during the Blues Bag four-day concert on the evenings of November 24–27, 1965 at the Cafe Au Go Go in New York City. The recording finished up in January 1966 at the same venue, by which time Tommy Flanders had left the band. They scaled down their usual lengthy arrangements for the album due to time constraints and record label wariness.

Al Kooper believes that it, like the band's other albums, was poorly recorded, and laments how Steve Katz's harmonica on Live at the Cafe Au Go Go "sounds like a duck call".

== Chart performance ==
The album peaked at No. 77 on the Billboard Top LPs chart.

== Track listing ==
=== Side one ===
1. "Goin' Down Louisiana" (Muddy Waters) – 4:04
2. "You Go, I'll Go with You" (Willie Dixon) – 3:49
3. "Catch the Wind" (Donovan) – 3:05
4. "I Want to Be Your Driver" (Chuck Berry) – 2:23
5. "Alberta" (Traditional) – 4:10
6. "The Way My Baby Walks" (Andy Kulberg) – 3:09

=== Side two ===
1. "Violets of Dawn" (Eric Andersen) – 2:56
2. "Back Door Man" (Dixon) – 3:16
3. "Jelly Jelly Blues" (Billy Eckstine, Earl Hines) – 4:45
4. "Spoonful" (Dixon) – 4:58
5. "Who Do You Love?" (Ellas McDaniel) – 5:30

== Personnel ==
=== Musicians ===
- Tommy Flanders – vocals (tracks B1, B2, B4, B5)
- Danny Kalb – lead guitar, vocals (tracks A1, A2, A5, A6)
- Al Kooper – organ, vocals (track A4)
- Steve Katz – rhythm guitar, vocals (track A3)
- Andy Kulberg – bass
- Roy Blumenfeld – drums

=== Technical ===
- Jerry Schoenbaum – producer, liner notes
- Val Valentin – engineer
- Charles Stewart – cover photo

== Charts ==
Chart (1966)	Peak position
US Billboard Top LPs	77
