= Logan English =

- Born: Logan Eberhardt English; November 29, 1928; Henderson, Kentucky, United States
- Died: March 9, 1983 (aged 54) Saratoga Springs, New York, US
- Genres: Folk music
- Occupations: Singer; guitarist; poet; playwright; MC
- Years active: 1956–1970s
- Labels: Folkways, Riverside, Monitor, 20th Century Fox

Logan Eberhardt English (November 29, 1928 – March 9, 1983) was an American folk singer, poet, and playwright. As MC at Gerde's Folk City in Greenwich Village, he was influential in Bob Dylan's early career, and also recorded one of the earliest albums produced as a tribute to Woody Guthrie.

== Life ==
He was born in Henderson, Kentucky, later moving to a farm in Bourbon County. His mother, Corilla (née Eberhardt), was a former opera singer. Both his father, Logan B. English, and his maternal grandfather, Fredrick W. Eberhardt, were Baptist ministers; Eberhardt was a published author, and Logan B. English was a farmer and prominent civic leader. Logan E. English later said that his grandfather's preachings, and the songs of the field hands on his father's farm, were vital in shaping his love of folk music and the theater.

He attended the Millersburg Military Academy before studying acting and speech at Georgetown College. After serving in the US Army in Korea, he returned to complete a Master's degree in Fine Arts at Yale School of Drama. He started to pursue an acting career in New York, and also began singing traditional folk songs in clubs in Greenwich Village and elsewhere. English had what was described as a "startlingly melodious voice, and a winning personality"; he was a talented guitarist, but did not write his own songs.

He began singing professionally in 1956. The following year, he recorded two albums for the Folkways label - Kentucky Folk Songs and Ballads, and The Days of '49: Songs of the Gold Rush, the latter with banjoist Billy Faier and a third album, Gambling Songs, for the Riverside label. His recordings and regular performances of traditional songs, in New York and Boston, helped put many of the traditional songs into wider circulation; his version of "Geordie", for example, was heard by Joan Baez who performed and recorded the song in 1962.

English performed at the opening night of Gerde's Folk City club in Greenwich Village in 1960, together with Carolyn Hester. He knew Woody Guthrie through mutual friends Bob and Sid Gleason, and was instrumental in securing Bob Dylan his first appearance at Gerde's in 1961. His widow Barbara Shutner said:

My husband, Logan English, and I met Bob Dylan at Bob and Sid Gleason's house... One night we were all sitting around and Woody said something like, "Play something" to this kid sitting on the couch. The kid was Bob Dylan, and he sang and it was just beautiful. So Logan said, "I'm working at Gerde's. I'm the MC. We'll get you to play there." So that Monday night, Bob came in and did his first set.

He sang at Carnegie Hall, toured extensively in the US and Canada, had a show on NYC radio station WBAI, and appeared in several plays, both on and off-Broadway. He also wrote poetry. Two of his verses, The Wind That Shakes The Barley and Beware You Sons of Sorrow, appear in The Kentucky Anthology: Two Hundred Years of Writing in the Bluegrass State, in which English is described as "Bourbon County's poet-errant, a man who loved Kentucky but who could never live for very long in the land that formed and nourished him and provided him with material for his poetry, plays and songs."

He appeared on several compilations and live recordings of folk music in the early 1960s, including The Life Treasury of American Folk Music. In 1962 he recorded the album American Folk Ballads for Monitor Records. The songs included sea shanties and children's songs, with English writing a short description or story about each song in the liner notes. He wrote:

From the wild-flower dusks of mountain twilights, out of steamy southern mud-flats and dusty midland prairies, off the sun-silver steel of cinder-blown railroad tracks and out of the chill damps of prison cells - from churches and saloons, cradles and gravesides come the songs of America that must be sung.

He recorded the album Logan English Sings the Woody Guthrie Songbag for 20th Century Fox Records in 1964. Released three years before Guthrie's death, and described as "an unselfish effort to boost the awareness of the iconic folk legend", it contained versions of thirteen of his songs, and led to English's identification as one of Guthrie's major interpreters. However, English's unwillingness to write his own songs, coupled with a chronic drinking problem, also made it increasingly difficult for him to maintain a successful performing or recording career.

He later moved to Saratoga Springs, New York, where he taught and occasionally gave public performances. In 1974, he released his final album, Woody Guthrie's Children's Songs, for the Folkways label. In 1979, he published a long autobiographical poem, No Land Where I Have Traveled: A Kentucky Poem, which was reprinted in 2001. He also wrote two full-length plays, and was commissioned by the Actors Theatre of Louisville to write a play based on the life of Kentucky politician Cassius Marcellus Clay, which was unfinished at the time of his death.

He died in Saratoga Springs in 1983, at the age of 54, when he was hit by an automobile while walking.

== Discography ==
- Kentucky Folk Songs and Ballads (Folkways, 1957)
- The Days of '49: Songs of the Gold Rush (with Billy Faier) (Folkways, 1957)
- Gambling Songs (Riverside, 1957)
- American Folk Ballads (Monitor, 1962)
- Logan English Sings The Woody Guthrie Songbag (20th Century Fox, 1964)
- Woody Guthrie's Children's Songs (Folkways, 1974)
