= Backstage pass (disambiguation) =

A backstage pass is a pass which allows its bearer access to employees-only areas at a performance venue. Backstage pass may also refer to:

- Backstage Pass (album), a 1980 double live album by Little River Band
- Backstage Pass (band), a pop-punk band from Los Angeles
- Backstage Pass, a 2016 visual novel video game by sakevisual
- Backstage Pass, a DVD compilation of The Simpsons episodes
- Backstage Pass, a former Walt Disney World attraction that later became part of the Studio Backlot Tour
- "Backstage Pass", a 2001 episode of That '70s Show
- BackStage Pass, a music television show produced by WKAR-TV
- Backstage Passes and Backstabbing Bastards, the 1998 autobiography of Al Kooper
- Dude Perfect: Backstage Pass, a 2020 documentary about Dude Perfect's history and a YouTube Originals video
- Grateful Dead: Backstage Pass, a 1992 documentary film about the Grateful Dead
- Guitar Hero III: Backstage Pass, a game in the Guitar Hero Mobile series

== See also ==
- View from a Backstage Pass, a 2007 double live album by The Who
