= Tommy Flanders =

- Genres: Blues rock; pop rock
- Occupation(s): Vocalist, musician, recording artist
- Instrument(s): Vocals, harmonica
- Years active: 1965–1972
- Labels: Verve Folkways, Verve Forecast, Capitol Records

Tommy Flanders is an American musician who was lead vocalist in the Blues Project for several periods in the band's history from 1966 to 1972.

== Career ==
=== The Blues Project ===
In late 1965, Flanders was asked to join the "Danny Kalb Quartet", led by blues guitarist Danny Kalb (1942-2022). Shortly after Flanders' arrival, their name was changed to the Blues Project. He appears on two Blues Project albums, their debut Live at the Cafe Au Go Go (Verve Folkways, 1966) and a reunion album eponymously titled Blues Project (Capitol Records, 1972), as well as on various compilations and greatest hits collections.

=== Solo ===
After his first departure from the Blues Project in 1966 (Flanders left before the debut album was issued), he signed with Verve Forecast, for whom he issued two commercially unsuccessful singles and one largely ignored album, The Moonstone (1969). In a review at AllMusic, rock journalist Richie Unterberger panned the album, saying, "Despite some top-flight backup musicians in Bruce Langhorne, Dick Rosmini, and Jerry Scheff, it was a fairly forgettable record, and certainly a low-energy one, the mellowness threatening to dissolve into sleepiness. It's one of those albums where nothing's especially wrong, but neither is anything especially right."

His 1967 Verve Forecast single, "Friday Night City" c/w "Bad Reputation," was produced by former Bob Dylan producer Tom Wilson. Both sides featured Frank Zappa (then of the Mothers of Invention) on guitar, and Zappa reportedly arranged and conducted both sessions as well. ("Friday Night City" was composed by Flanders; "Bad Reputation" by Tim Hardin). Flanders' final solo release was a single, "The Moonstone" c/w "Between Purple and Blue," issued on Verve Forecast sometime in the 1970s (the exact year is unknown).

== Later life ==
He later went into artist management; his clients included Carolyne Mas.

== Discography ==
=== With The Blues Project ===
==== Live albums ====
Title	Label	Year
Live at The Cafe Au Go Go	Verve Forecast	1966

==== Albums ====
Title	Label	Year
Blues Project	Capitol	1972

=== Solo ===
==== Albums ====
Title	Label	Year	Note
The Moonstone	Verve Forecast	1969	

==== Singles ====
A-Side	B-Side	Label	Year	Note
"Friday Night City"		Verve Forecast	1967	
"First Time, Last Time"	"Between Purple And Blue"	Verve Forecast	1970	
"The Moonstone"	"Between Purple and Blue"	Verve Forecast	c. 1970	
