= You Never Know Who Your Friends Are =

1969 album by Al Kooper

Studio album by Al Kooper
- Released: September 1969
- Recorded: 1969
- Genre: Rock, blues rock, R&B
- Length: 42:04
- Label: Columbia
- Producer: Al Kooper

Al Kooper chronology
I Stand Alone (1969)	You Never Know Who Your Friends Are (1969)	Easy Does It (1970)

Singles from You Never Know Who Your Friends Are
- 1. "You Never Know Who Your Friends Are" Released: February 1969

Professional ratings
Review scores
Source	Rating
AllMusic	3/5 stars
Robert Christgau	D
Rolling Stone	(unfavorable)

You Never Know Who Your Friends Are is the second solo album by American multi-instrumentalist Al Kooper, issued in 1969 on Columbia Records.

== Background ==
Kooper wasted no time recording this album, coming just seven months after his debut release. It is a continuation of sorts of his debut; the album contains another eclectic mix of rock, rhythm and blues, jazz, pop, and blues, though without the psychedelics that had somewhat permeated through I Stand Alone. Utilizing a large group of musicians under the direction of Charlie Calello, known collectively as "The Al Kooper Big Band", Kooper also strayed away from the heavy string orchestrations of his debut.

Relying on more original compositions, with nine of twelve tracks by Kooper, and the remaining three by Harry Nilsson and Motown Records staff songwriters, the album further helped to cement Kooper's reputation. The album reached #125 on the Billboard 200 on October 25, 1969, and was on the charts for six weeks.

== Track listing ==
All tracks composed by Al Kooper; except where indicated

1. "Magic in My Socks" – (3:55)
2. "Lucille" – (3:24)
3. "Too Busy Thinkin' 'bout My Baby" (Norman Whitfield, Janie Bradford – 3:20)
4. "First Time Around" – (2:48)
5. "Loretta (Union Turnpike Eulogy)" – (3:48)
6. "Blues, Part IV" – (5:04)
7. "You Never Know Who Your Friends Are" – (2:53)
8. "The Great American Marriage / Nothing" – (3:19)
9. "I Don't Know Why I Love You" (Lula Mae Hardaway, Don Hunter, Paul Riser, Stevie Wonder – 3:22)
10. "Mourning Glory Story" (Harry Nilsson – 2:16)
11. "Anna Lee (What Can I Do for You)" – (3:18)
12. "I'm Never Gonna Let You Down" – (4:37)

== Personnel ==
=== Musicians ===
- Al Kooper – piano, organ, guitar, ondioline, vocals, arrangements
- With The Al Kooper Big Band under the direction of Charlie Calello
- Ralph Casale, Eric Gale, Stu Scharf – guitars
- Paul Griffin, Ernie Hayes, Frank Owens – piano, organ
- Walter Sears – Moog synthesizer
- Jerry Jemmott, John Miller, Chuck Rainey – electric bass
- Bernard Purdie, Al Rogers – drums
- Bernie Glow, Ernie Royal, Marvin Stamm – trumpets
- Ray Desio, Jimmy Knepper, Bill Watrous, Tony Studd – trombones
- George Young, Sol Schlinger, Seldon Powell, Joe Farrell – saxophones
- Hilda Harris, Connie Zimet, Albertine Robinson, Lois Winter, Michael Gately, Lou Christie, Robert John, Charlie Calello – backing vocals

=== Technical ===
- Al Kooper – producer
- Glen Kolotkin, Roy Segal, Stan Tonkel – engineers
- Ron Coro – cover art direction and design
