= Here Comes Shuggie Otis =

Studio album by Shuggie Otis
- Released: August 25, 1970
- Recorded: 1969
- Length: 34:56
- Label: Epic
- Producer: Johnny Otis

Shuggie Otis chronology
Kooper Session (1969)	Here Comes Shuggie Otis (1970)	Freedom Flight (1971)

Professional ratings
Review scores
Source	Rating
AllMusic	4/5 stars

Here Comes Shuggie Otis is the debut studio album by American singer-songwriter, recording artist and multi-instrumentalist Shuggie Otis. It was released in 1970 on Epic Records with 10 tracks.

== Track listing ==
Side one
No.	Title	Writer(s)	Length
1.	"Oxford Gray"	Johnny Otis, Shuggie Otis	6:53
2.	"Jennie Lee"	Wilton Felder, Johnny Otis, Shuggie Otis	2:15
3.	"Bootie Cooler"	Johnny Otis, Shuggie Otis	2:41
4.	"Knowing (That You Want Him)"	Johnny Otis	2:35
5.	"Funky Thithee"	Johnny Otis, Shuggie Otis	3:15

Side two
No.	Title	Writer(s)	Length
6.	"Shuggie's Boogie"	Johnny Otis, Shuggie Otis	5:30
7.	"Hurricane"	Johnny Otis, Shuggie Otis	2:15
8.	"Gospel Groove"	Johnny Otis, Shuggie Otis	4:10
9.	"Baby, I Needed You"	Johnny Otis, Shuggie Otis	4:00
10.	"The Hawks"	Johnny Otis, Shuggie Otis	2:22
Total length:			34:56

== Personnel ==
Musicians

- Shuggie Otis – lead and backing vocals, guitar, piano, harpsichord, organ, celesta
- Johnny Otis – piano, harpsichord, celesta, timpani, percussion
- Wilton Felder – bass, harpsichord, celesta
- Stix Hooper, Abe Mills, Paul Lagos – drums
- Leon Haywood – organ
- Ray Johnson – piano
- Al McKibbon – string bass
- Bob Mitchell, Melvin Moore – trumpet
- Gene "Mighty Flea" Conners – trombone
- Richard Mackey, Willie Ruff – French horn
- Hyman Gold, Irving Lipschultz – cello
- Marilyn Baker, Rollice Dale – violin
- Jim Horn, Plas Johnson, Preston Love, Hank Jernigan, Jack Kelso – saxophone
- Eunice Wennermark, Ginger Smock, Isadore Roman, Joe Lichter – strings
- Preston Love, Jack Kelso, Hank Jernigan – flute

Other personnel

- Rafael O. Valentin – engineer
- Pete Welding – liner notes
