= Kooper Session =

Kooper Session: Super Session, Vol. II

Studio album by Al Kooper with Shuggie Otis
- Released: 1969
- Recorded: 1968
- Genre: Rock, blues, R&B
- Length: 40:58
- Label: Columbia
- Producer: Al Kooper

Al Kooper with Shuggie Otis chronology
Kooper Session: Super Session, Vol. II (1969)	Here Comes Shuggie Otis (1970)

Professional ratings
Review scores
Source	Rating
AllMusic	4/5 stars

Kooper Session is the second-in-line of the Super Session albums featuring singer-songwriter Al Kooper. Joining Kooper in the guitar slot is 15-year-old phenomenon Shuggie Otis, son of rhythm and blues pioneer Johnny Otis.

Divided into two halves, "The Songs" (a quartet of arranged gospel and rhythm and blues tracks) and "The Blues" (a trio of improvised blues tracks), the album, like Super Session before it, was quickly recorded and featured short, succinct tracks ("Double or Nothing", "One Room Country Shack") and fluid, drawn out jams highlighting the talents of the artists ("12:15 Slow Goonbash Blues", "Bury My Body").

== Track listing ==
No.	Title	Writer(s)	Length
1.	"Bury My Body"	Al Kooper, Alan Price	9:00
2.	"Double or Nothing"	Steve Cropper, Donald "Duck" Dunn, Booker T. Jones, Al Jackson, Jr.	2:29
3.	"One Room Country Shack"	Mercy Dee Walton	3:37
4.	"Lookin' for a Home"	Edward Forehand	5:52
5.	"12:15 Goonbash Blues"	Al Kooper, Shuggie Otis	9:29
6.	"Shuggie's Old Time Dee-Di-Lee-Di-Leet-Deet Slide Boogie"	Al Kooper, Shuggie Otis	4:05
7.	"Shuggie's Shuffle"	Al Kooper, Shuggie Otis	6:27
Total length:			40:58

== Charts ==
Chart (1970)	Peak position
Australia (Kent Music Report)	11

== Personnel ==
=== Musicians ===
- Al Kooper – organ (all tracks), vocals (tracks 1, 3–4), piano (tracks 1, 4)
- Shuggie Otis – guitar
- Stu Woods – electric bass (tracks 1–5, 7)
- Wells Kelly – drums (tracks 1–5, 7)
- Mark Klingman – piano (tracks 2, 5, 7)
- The Hilda Harris-Albertine Robinson Singers – backing vocals (tracks 1, 4)

=== Technical ===
- Al Kooper – producer, liner notes
- Doug Pomeroy – engineer
- Roy Segal – engineer
- Lloyd Ziff – design, photography
- Myra Zeller, Sandy Speiser – additional photography
