= I Stand Alone (Al Kooper album) =

1969 studio album by Al Kooper

Studio album by Al Kooper
- Released: February 1969
- Recorded: 1968
- Genre: Rock
- Length: 41:24
- Label: Columbia
- Producer: Al Kooper

Al Kooper chronology
Super Session (1968)	I Stand Alone (1969)	You Never Know Who Your Friends Are (1969)

Singles from I Stand Alone
- 1. "Soft Landing on the Moon" Released: February 1969 B-side of "You Never Know Who Your Friends Are"; 2. "Hey, Western Union Man" Released: March 18, 1969

Professional ratings
Review scores
Source	Rating
AllMusic	4.5/5 stars
The Encyclopedia of Popular Music	3/5 stars

I Stand Alone is the debut album by the American singer-songwriter Al Kooper, issued in 1969 on Columbia Records. It was recorded after his collaboration with Michael Bloomfield and Stephen Stills on the 1968 album Super Session.

== Background ==
After ten years of session playing, collaborations and playing in other bands, Kooper released his first solo album in February, 1969. It is an eclectic mix of country, soul, blues, and rock with a dose of psychedelia mixed throughout. It is a continuation of Super Session in its mix of disparate covers from the likes of Bill Monroe, Harry Nilsson and Traffic, and with originals running the gamut of feelings.

Unlike the Super Session album, however, the spotlight is on Kooper alone and Kooper's alternate utilization of orchestras and professional Nashville studio musicians; the tracks are far more focused, all within two and five minutes. "Camille" is lifted from "Overture to Le Domino Noire" by French composer Daniel Auber.

Most tracks are bridged with sound effects taken from albums issued by Elektra Records. The Overture begins with a collage of sound effects also taken from those albums. The album was on the Billboard 200 chart for 13 weeks, peaking at number 54 on March 15, 1969.

== Track listing ==
All tracks composed by Al Kooper; except where indicated

1. "Overture" – 4:39
2. "I Stand Alone" – 3:37
3. "Camille" (Kooper, Tony Powers) – 2:54
4. "One" (Harry Nilsson) – 2:53
5. "Coloured Rain" (Steve Winwood, Jim Capaldi, Chris Wood) – 3:01
6. "Soft Landing on the Moon" – 3:58
7. "I Can Love a Woman" – 3:28
8. "Blue Moon of Kentucky" (Bill Monroe) – 2:14
9. "Toe Hold" (Isaac Hayes, David Porter) – 3:53
10. "Right Now for You" – 2:33
11. "Hey, Western Union Man" (Jerry Butler, Kenny Gamble, Leon Huff) – 3:43
12. "Song and Dance for the Unborn, Frightened Child" – 4:31

== Personnel ==
=== Musicians ===
- Al Kooper – piano, organ, ondioline, guitars, vocals, orchestrations (track 5)
- Wayne Moss – guitar (tracks 2, 8, 9, 10, and 11)
- Jerry Kennedy – guitar (tracks 2, 8 [solo], 9, 10, and 11)
- "Big" Charlie Daniels – guitar (tracks 2, 8, 9, 10, and 11)
- Charlie McCoy – electric bass (tracks 2, 8, 9, 10, and 11), orchestrations (track 8)
- Ken Buttrey – drums (tracks 2, 8, 9, 10, and 11)
- The Blossoms – backing vocals (tracks 2, 3, 7, 9, 10, and 11)
- Charlie Calello – orchestrations (tracks 3 and 7)
- Don Ellis – orchestrations (track 5)
- Jimmy Wisner – orchestrations (tracks 1, 4, and 12)

=== Technical ===
- Al Kooper – producer
- Brian Ross-Myring, Charlie Bragg, Don Puluse, Fred Catero, Glen Kolotkin, Neil Wilburn – engineers
