= Shuggie Otis =

American multi-instrumentalist and singer-songwriter (born 1953)

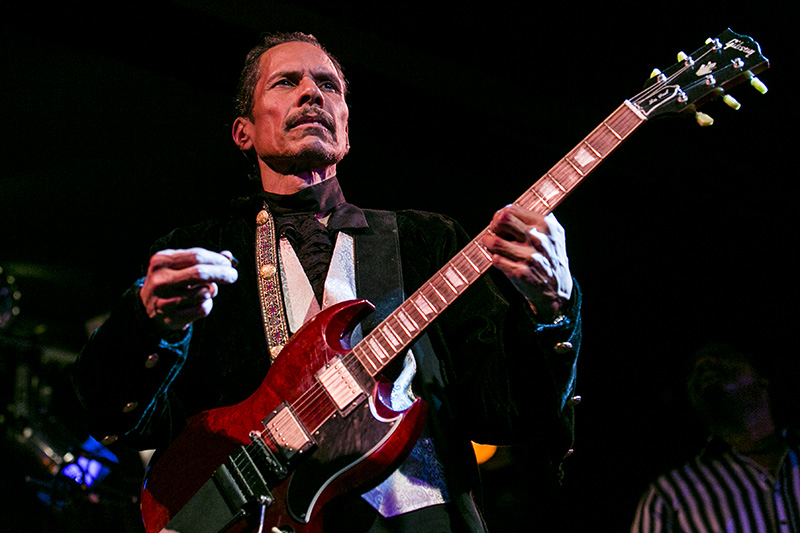
- Otis in 2013

Background information
- Born: Johnny Alexander Veliotes Jr. November 30, 1953 (age 72); Los Angeles, California, U.S.
- Genres: R&B; psychedelic soul; electric blues; progressive soul
- Instruments: Vocals; guitar; bass; drums; piano; organ
- Years active: 1960s–present
- Labels: Cleopatra and various labels
- Website: https://shuggieotismusic.com/

Johnny Shuggie Otis (born Johnny Alexander Veliotes Jr.; November 30, 1953) is an American singer-songwriter, recording artist, and multi-instrumentalist.

Otis's composition "Strawberry Letter 23" as recorded by the Brothers Johnson topped the Billboard R&B chart and reached No. 5 on the Billboard Hot 100 chart in 1977. He achieved commercial success with his 1974 single "Inspiration Information" (from the album of the same title), reaching No. 56 on the R&B chart.

== Biography ==
Born in Los Angeles, California, Otis is the son of rhythm and blues musician, bandleader, and impresario Johnny Otis (1921–2012), who was of Greek descent, and his wife Phyllis Walker (1922–2016), who was of African American and Filipino descent. The name "Shuggie" (short for "sugar", according to his mother) was coined by Phyllis when he was a newborn. Otis began playing guitar when he was two years old and performing professionally with his father's band at the age of eleven, often disguising himself with dark glasses and a false mustache so that he could play with his father's band in after-hours nightclubs.

Otis is primarily known as a guitarist, but he sings and plays many other instruments. While growing up with and being heavily influenced by many blues, jazz and R&B musicians in his father's immediate circle, Otis began to gravitate towards the popular music of his generation such as the music of Jimi Hendrix, Arthur Lee (of the band Love), and Sly Stone.

In 1969, Al Kooper asked Otis to be the featured guest on the second installment (Kooper Session) of the Super Session album series that had previously included Stephen Stills and Mike Bloomfield. Kooper and the then-fifteen-year-old Otis recorded the whole album over one weekend in New York. After returning to Los Angeles, Otis, along with his father and singer Delmar "Mighty Mouth" Evans, performed on the album Cold Shot (by the elder Otis), released in 1969 on the Los Angeles-based Kent label. Another obscure album this three-man team recorded was the extremely rare and risque Snatch & The Poontangs, on which Otis recorded tracks under the pseudonym "Prince Wunnerful".

Otis released his first solo album later that year entitled Here Comes Shuggie Otis on Epic Records. Guest musicians on his debut included Johnny, Leon Haywood, Al McKibbon, Wilton Felder. This further established his reputation and catapulted him to the attention of B. B. King, who was quoted in a 1970 issue of Guitar Player magazine saying Otis was his "favorite new guitarist". Some of the artists Otis performed and recorded with during that time include Frank Zappa (having played electric bass on the instrumental, "Peaches en Regalia" from the 1969 album Hot Rats), Etta James, Eddie Vinson, Richard Berry, Louis Jordan, and Bobby 'Blue' Bland, among many others.

The album Otis received the most recognition for was his second Epic Records release in 1971, Freedom Flight, which featured his hit "Strawberry Letter 23". The single caught the attention of Brothers Johnson guitarist George Johnson, who then played it for producer Quincy Jones. They covered the song and it became a hit. Even though Otis played most of his own parts in the studio, the lineup on this album was quite extensive, including keyboardist George Duke and Aynsley Dunbar of Frank Zappa, Journey and Whitesnake fame.

In 1974, Otis released Inspiration Information, his third and final album for Epic Records. The album had taken almost three years to finish. All the songs were written and arranged by Otis himself, who played every musical instrument on the album, except for horns and some strings. After the album's release, Otis was approached by Billy Preston on behalf of The Rolling Stones, asking him to join the band for their upcoming world tour. He declined the offer, along with the chance to have Quincy Jones help produce Otis's next album. After a series of similar refusals, Otis gained a reputation for hesitancy or reluctance in taking on work, and his recording contract with Epic Records was nullified. Otis's only credited works throughout the mid-1970s were done as a session musician for his father's recording projects.

Inspiration Information gained a cult following during the 1990s with the emergence of rare groove and acid jazz. It was lauded by such musicians as Prince and Lenny Kravitz. Due in part to this regained interest, the album was re-released on April 3, 2001, by David Byrne's independent label Luaka Bop Records. This CD re-issue includes all nine original album tracks plus four songs taken from Otis's 1971 album Freedom Flight, and features new cover art, liner notes, and exclusive never-seen-before photos.

Otis is featured in every one of his father Johnny's books, as well as Alligator Records Presents West Coast Blues, issued in August 1998.

Otis and Sony Music Entertainment made a deal for a double CD released on April 20, 2013. Disc 1 was a reissue of Inspiration Information with four bonus tracks. Disc 2 was Wings of Love, an album of previously unreleased material, all of which was written from 1975 to 2013, including live material from some of his performances. It was available on Shugiterius Records (Otis's company) and Sony Records, through Sony Music Entertainment.

Otis and a band entitled Shuggie Otis Rite toured internationally in 2013 in support of the release, including Australia, Japan, the U.S., Ireland and the U.K. Their performances earned rave reviews from critics.

A new, mostly instrumental, album was released in April 2018 titled Inter-Fusion on Cleopatra Records.

== Personal life ==
Otis had a son named Johnny III, known as Lucky Otis, with his first wife Miss Mercy of The GTOs, an all-girl group produced by Frank Zappa. Soon after his first marriage ended, he married Lillian Wilson (known as Teri), daughter of trumpeter/bandleader/Latin-jazz pioneer Gerald Wilson; they had a son, Eric, naming him after Eric Dolphy, who was one of Gerald's bandmates and close friends.

Both of Shuggie's sons, Lucky and Eric, are musicians and have both played and toured in their father's band. Lucky, a bassist, began by playing with his grandfather, Johnny Otis, and then launched a solo career, heading his own group Otis Ledbetter with partner Louis Ledbetter, great-grandson of blues musician Lead Belly. He has also fronted a 13-piece rhythm-and-blues orchestra, The New Johnny Otis All-Stars, continuing his grandfather's Big Band legacy.

== Discography ==
=== Studio albums ===
- Here Comes Shuggie Otis (1970), Epic Records
- Freedom Flight (1971), Epic Records
- Inspiration Information (1974), Epic Records
- Inter-Fusion (2018), Cleopatra Records

=== Collaborations ===
With The Johnny Otis Show

- Cold Shot! (1968), Kent Records
- Snatch & The Poontangs (1969), Kent Records
- Cuttin' Up (1970), Epic Records
- The Johnny Otis Show Live at Monterey! (1970), Epic Records [2-LP]
- The New Johnny Otis Show with Shuggie Otis (1981), Alligator Records
- Into the Eighties (1984), Charly R&B [UK] Records
- Otisology (1986), Kent Records
- Good Lovin' Blues (1990), Ace [UK] Records

With Bo Diddley

- Where It All Began (1972), Chess Records

With Guitar Slim Green

- Stone Down Blues (1970), Kent Records

With Etta James and Eddie "Cleanhead" Vinson

- Blues in the Night Volume One: The Early Show (1986), Fantasy Records
- The Late Show: Blues in the Night Volume 2 (1987), Fantasy Records

With Al Kooper

- Kooper Session (1969), Columbia Records

With Preston Love

- Preston Love's Omaha-Bar-B-Q (1969), Kent Records

With Gerald Wilson Orchestra

- Lomelin (1981) Discovery Records

With Frank Zappa

- "Peaches en Regalia" from the album Hot Rats (1969)

With Jimmy Vivino

- "Violet In Blue" from the album Novemberin' (2008)

With Mark Lotito

- "Novemberin'" from the album Novemberin' (2008)

=== Compilations ===
- Shuggie's Boogie: Shuggie Otis Plays The Blues (1994), Epic Records / Legacy Recordings
- World Psychedelic Classics 2: California Soul... Shuggie Otis - Inspiration Information (2001), Luaka Bop Records Reworking and reissue of Shuggie's 1974 album Inspiration Information.
- In Session: Great Rhythm & Blues (2002), Golden Lane Records
- Original Album Classics: Shuggie Otis (2013), Epic Records / Legacy Recordings [3-CD]
- Wings of Love (2013), Sony Records / Legacy Recordings
