= Backstage Passes and Backstabbing Bastards =

Backstage Passes and Backstabbing Bastards: Memoirs of a Rock 'N' Roll Survivor
- Author: Al Kooper
- Language: English
- Genre: Autobiography
- Publisher: Billboard Books (1998), Hal Leonard Corporation (2008)
- Publication date: 1998, February 1, 2008
- Publication place: United States
- Media type: Print, ebook
- Pages: 328 pages (2008 edition)
- ISBN: 0879309229 (2008)

Backstage Passes and Backstabbing Bastards: Memoirs of a Rock 'N' Roll Survivor is a 1998 autobiography by American songwriter, record producer and musician Al Kooper. The book is a revised version of Kooper's earlier 1977 book Backstage Passes: Rock 'n' Roll Life In The Sixties. The 1998 edition was initially published by Billboard Books, but went out of print until 2008, when it was re-published by the Hal Leonard Corporation with updates to the text.

== Synopsis ==
In the book Kooper talks about his interactions with the music industry, including information about artists such as Bob Dylan. Kooper also discusses his days as a successful songwriter who co-authored the hit "This Diamond Ring"; his membership in The Blues Project; his forming and leaving the band Blood, Sweat, and Tears; his collaborations and friendship with blues guitarist Mike Bloomfield; and, his discovery and early production of Southern rock legends Lynyrd Skynyrd.

== Reception ==
Critical reception to Backstage Passes and Backstabbing Bastards was positive, with the Headpress Guide to the Counter Culture commenting that it was "a genuinely funny read". The book also garnered a positive review from The Morton Report, who commented that it was a "great book" and that "almost every paragraph is designed to make you laugh in a laconic and self-deprecating manner".
