= Inspiration Information =

Studio album by Shuggie Otis
- Released: October 1974
- Recorded: 1971–1974
- Studios: Hawk Sound and Columbia Studios, Los Angeles
- Genres: Psychedelic soul; progressive soul; R&B; psychedelic funk
- Length: 31:38
- Label: Epic
- Producer: Shuggie Otis

Shuggie Otis chronology
| Freedom Flight (1971) | Inspiration Information (1974) |

Inspiration Information is the third studio album by American musician Shuggie Otis, who produced it and performed most of its instrumental parts. Released in 1974 on Epic Records, it reached number 181 on Billboard's Top 200 Pop Albums list, and its title track also reached number 56 on the U.S. R&B singles chart.

The album was reissued in 2001 on the label Luaka Bop, receiving widespread acclaim.

== Recording ==
Inspiration Information was Otis's debut project as both an adult and a producer, having been a teenager backed on his two previous solo efforts by his father, R&B pioneer Johnny Otis. His relationship with Epic came under heavy scrutiny as he would take three years to finish Inspiration and fulfill his three-album contract; this would be the final release of Otis on the Epic label.

The utilization of analog drum machines gave Inspiration a newer electric sound that at the time was being used by only a handful of Otis's contemporaries, notably by Sly Stone. The Guardian called the album "an intoxicating blend of psychedelic soul and folky introspection, marked by a prescient use of electronics". Pitchfork describes the sound of the album as a combination of "smooth, organ-driven California funk, quasi–new age psychedelia, loungey jazz instrumentals, [and] string interludes—all propelled by the same kind of analog drum machine that had piqued Ralf & Florian's interest at the same time".

== Release ==
Professional ratings
Review scores
| Source | Rating |
|---|---|
| AllMusic | 4.5/5 stars |
| Pitchfork | 8.8/10 |
| The Village Voice | C+ |

The album commercially underperformed Epic's expectations and Otis was dropped from the label following its release. However, it garnered Otis comparisons to Stevie Wonder and Marvin Gaye, and reportedly impressed Sly Stone.

Inspiration was re-issued on CD by independent label Luaka Bop Records. This version, released on April 3, 2001, included the original album in its entirety as well as four songs taken from Otis's 1971 album Freedom Flight, including "Strawberry Letter 23".

The album was re-released again in 2013 with four previously unreleased tracks from 1971: "Miss Pretty", "Magic", "Things We Like to Do" and "Castle Top Jam". The re-release also features a second CD entitled Wings of Love featuring 14 previously unreleased live and studio tracks recorded by Shuggie between 1975 and 2000.

Pitchfork rated the title track as its 149th best song of the 1970s.

Sharon Jones & the Dap-Kings covered "Inspiration Information" on the 2009 Red Hot Organization compilation Dark Was the Night.

== Tracklist ==
All tracks are written by Shuggie Otis.

| No. | Title | Length |
|---|---|---|
| 1. | "Inspiration Information" | 4:07 |
| 2. | "Island Letter" | 4:40 |
| 3. | "Sparkle City" | 5:55 |
| 4. | "Aht Uh Mi Hed" | 4:14 |
| 5. | "Happy House" | 1:08 |
| 6. | "Rainy Day" | 2:39 |
| 7. | "XL-30" | 2:05 |
| 8. | "Pling!" | 4:24 |
| 9. | "Not Available" | 2:26 |
| Total length: | | 31:38 |

2001 reissue bonus tracks
| No. | Title | Length |
|---|---|---|
| 10. | "Strawberry Letter 23" | 3:59 |
| 11. | "Sweet Thang" | 4:02 |
| 12. | "Ice Cold Daydream" | 2:30 |
| 13. | "Freedom Flight" | 12:56 |

== Personnel ==
Credits adapted from AllMusic.

- Shuggie Otis – lead and backing vocals; guitar, bass, drums, organ, piano, electric piano, vibraphone, percussion, analog drum machines
- Jack Kelso – saxophones, flute
- Jeff Martinez – French horn
- Carol Robbins – harp
- Doug Wintz, Jim Prindle – trombone
- Curt Sletten, Ron Robbins – trumpet
- Barbara Porter, Brian Asher, D. Jones, J. Parker, Louis Rosen, Marcia Zeavin, N. Roth, Steve Boone, T. Ziegler – strings

== Charts ==
| Chart (1975) | Peak position |
|---|---|
| Billboard Pop Albums | 181 |

=== Singles ===
| Year | Single | Chart positions |
| Year | Single | US R&B |
|---|---|---|
| 1975 | "Inspiration Information" | 56 |
