= Freedom Flight (Shuggie Otis album) =

Studio album by Shuggie Otis
- Released: September 1971
- Recorded: 1971
- Length: 38:19
- Label: Epic
- Producer: Johnny Otis

Shuggie Otis chronology
Here Comes Shuggie Otis (1970)	Freedom Flight (1971)	Inspiration Information (1974)

Professional ratings
Review scores
Source	Rating
AllMusic	4.5/5 stars

Freedom Flight is the second studio album by American singer-songwriter, recording artist and multi-instrumentalist Shuggie Otis.

The album was released in September of 1971 with seven tracks including the original version of "Strawberry Letter 23", a 1977 hit for the Brothers Johnson.

== Track listing ==
Side one
No.	Title	Writer(s)	Length
1.	"Ice Cold Daydream"	Shuggie Otis	2:29
2.	"Strawberry Letter 23"	Shuggie Otis	3:57
3.	"Sweet Thang"	Johnny Otis, Shuggie Otis	4:11
4.	"Me and My Woman"	Gene Barge	4:16
5.	"Someone's Always Singing"	Shuggie Otis	3:22

Side Two
No.	Title	Writer(s)	Length
6.	"Purple"	Shuggie Otis	7:07
7.	"Freedom Flight"	Shuggie Otis	12:57
Total length:			38:19

== Personnel ==
- Shuggie Otis - lead and backing vocals, guitar, bass, organ, piano, drums, bells, bottleneck guitar, tack piano
- Johnny Otis - percussion, backing vocals
- Wilton Felder - bass
- George Duke - organ, electric piano, celesta
- Aynsley Dunbar - drums
- Mike Kowalski - drums
- Richard Aplanalp - tenor saxophone, oboe, flute
- James "Supe" Bradshaw - harmonica, backing vocals
- Venetta Fields, Clydie King, Sherlie Matthews - backing vocals
