= Live at The Gaslight 1962 =

Live album by Bob Dylan
- Released: August 30, 2005
- Recorded: October 1962
- Venue: The Gaslight Cafe, New York
- Genre: Folk
- Length: 46:29
- Label: Columbia
- Producer: Steve Berkowitz; Jeff Rosen

Bob Dylan chronology
The Bootleg Series Vol. 7: No Direction Home: The Soundtrack (2005)	Live at The Gaslight 1962 (2005)	Live at Carnegie Hall 1963 (2005)

Professional ratings
Review scores
Source	Rating
AllMusic	3.5/5 stars
The Encyclopedia of Popular Music	3/5 stars

Live at The Gaslight 1962 is a live album including ten songs from early Bob Dylan performances recorded in October 1962 at The Gaslight Cafe in New York City's Greenwich Village. Released in 2005 by Columbia Records, it was originally distributed through an exclusive 18-month deal with Starbucks, after which it was released to the general retail market. The album release coincided with the release of the documentary No Direction Home: Bob Dylan (and accompanying 26-song soundtrack).

== Background ==
The performances documented on Live at The Gaslight 1962 were recorded early in Dylan's career, during the hiatus between his first and second albums, when Dylan was still virtually unknown outside Greenwich Village. These performances occurred sometime in October 1962 at The Gaslight Cafe, self-proclaimed for hosting “the best entertainment in the Village.” The Gaslight was considered one of the premiere performance venues for the era's new wave of folk singers, serving as a springboard for Phil Ochs, Tom Paxton, Dylan and others. Dylan's performances were recorded on a reel-to-reel tape recorder patched into the house PA system and operated by sound engineer Richard Alderson, who would later handle the sound for Dylan's 1966 tour.

These Gaslight recordings have circulated among Dylan collectors for many years. They made their first appearance on bootleg LPs no later than 1973 , and have appeared, in various forms, on several bootleg LPs and CDs and on many Dylan fan CDR projects. The full set of recordings, including 17 tracks, is usually referred to by Dylan collectors as the "Second Gaslight Tape", but some refer to the recordings as a compilation of the "Second" and "Third Gaslight Tape", believing them to be compiled from two different sets at The Gaslight (noting differences in sound quality).

== Previous releases ==
Two tracks from these recordings were previously released on official Dylan albums: "No More Auction Block" appeared on The Bootleg Series Volumes 1–3 (Rare & Unreleased) 1961–1991 in 1991 and "Handsome Molly" appeared on the Japanese release Live 1961–2000: Thirty-Nine Years of Great Concert Performances. A third track, "The Cuckoo", was one of six songs included on a promotional CD distributed in U.S. retail markets in association with the official release of Dylan's memoir, Chronicles, Volume 1 in 2004.

== Songs ==
Live at The Gaslight 1962 captures early performances of three different Dylan compositions: "A Hard Rain's A-Gonna Fall" (often referred to as "Hard Rain"), "Don't Think Twice, It's All Right", and "John Brown". Both "Hard Rain" and "Don't Think Twice, It's All Right" would eventually appear on Dylan's second album, The Freewheelin' Bob Dylan", in May 1963. Around the same time, a studio version of "John Brown" was included on the Folkways Records compilation Broadside Ballads, Vol. 1 in 1963, but it would not be released on any of Dylan's subsequent studio albums (much later the song would re-appear as a live performance on Dylan's 1995 MTV Unplugged album.)

"Rocks and Gravel", also credited as a Bob Dylan composition, is Dylan's own adaptation of Brownie McGhee's "Solid Road" and Leroy Carr's "Alabama Woman", an arrangement that fuses both songs into one. It was originally slated to appear on Dylan's second album (and later appeared on test pressings made for a preliminary version of the LP), but when Dylan reconfigured The Freewheelin' Bob Dylan, he omitted "Rocks And Gravel" from the final album sequence.

The remaining songs on Live at The Gaslight 1962 show off the young Dylan's already-broad knowledge of traditional folk songs. These include, among others, “The Cuckoo”, which was recorded as early as the 1920s by western North Carolina banjo musician Clarence Ashley; “Moonshiner”, a traditional song that had also been performed by Irish folksters the Clancy Brothers (playing together with Pete Seeger) as well as by Appalachian folk singer Roscoe Holcomb; and “Barbara Allen”, described by music historian Dave Marsh as “the most widespread folk song in the English language.”

== Critical reception ==
Even before the release of the official album, the recordings of the October 1962 cafe performances were well-reviewed. According to bobsboots.com, a website devoted to documenting Dylan bootlegs, the Gaslight recordings are considered “a ‘must have’ to any serious collection.” In preparation for the 2005 Columbia release, the recordings were re-engineered, rendering the songs “considerably clearer than their bootleg versions,” according to music critic William Ruhlmann, yet still retaining “their unofficial quality, with occasional flaws.” Entertainment Weekly's David Browne gave the Columbia issue an A− grade, stating, “Gaslight is a spellbinding reminder that Dylan was never a typical folkie (or typical anything, for that matter.)” Sean Wilentz, who wrote the liner notes for the CD (and which he would much expand on in his 2010 book Dylan in America), notes that, “for all of its unpretentious, even impromptu qualities,” the Gaslight recordings show “how greatly and rapidly Dylan's creativity was growing.”

== Controversy ==
The choice to release the Gaslight recordings initially through an exclusive deal with the corporate coffee giant Starbucks outraged some fans, who cited this as one more example of Dylan “selling out.” Many music retailers were upset as well, since Starbucks had exclusive rights to sell the release CD for 18 months. Large music retailer HMV Canada responded by pulling all Bob Dylan products off their shelves in protest. (HMV Canada had taken a similar stance with the Starbucks-exclusive release of Alanis Morissette's "Jagged Little Pill Acoustic", removing all of the artist's catalog from their shelves.) Afterwards, in order to appease frustrated HMV customers, Columbia offered the Live at The Gaslight 1962 CD as a free giveaway with any Bob Dylan purchase at HMV stores.

== Track listing ==
Live at The Gaslight 1962 track listing
No.	Title	Writer(s)	Length
1.	"A Hard Rain's A-Gonna Fall"	Bob Dylan	6:57
2.	"Rocks and Gravel"	Bob Dylan	5:12
3.	"Don't Think Twice, It's All Right"	Bob Dylan	3:19
4.	"The Cuckoo"	trad., arr. by Clarence Ashley	2:21
5.	"Moonshiner"	trad., arr. by Bob Dylan	4:16
6.	"Handsome Molly"	trad., arr. by Bob Dylan	2:50
7.	"Cocaine"	trad., arr. by Rev. Gary Davis	2:59
8.	"John Brown"	Bob Dylan	5:58
9.	"Barbara Allen"	trad., arr. by Bob Dylan	8:09
10.	"West Texas"	trad., arr. by Bob Dylan	4:35
