= The Deadly Nightshade =

American rock and country band

- Also known as: Ariel
- Origin: Northampton, Massachusetts
- Genres: Country rock, folk rock
- Years active: 1967-1970, 1972-1977, 2008-Present
- Label: Phantom/RCA
- Members: Anne Bowen; Helen Hooke
- Past members: Gretchen Pfeifer; Beverly Rodgers; Florence Ballard (one show, 1975); Pamela Brandt

The Deadly Nightshade is a New England–based rock and country trio consisting of members Anne Bowen, Pamela Brandt, and Helen Hooke, who originally began performing under the name Ariel in 1967, along with Gretchen Pfeifer and Beverly Rodgers. It was one of the earliest all-women rock bands signed to a major label, and an early women's music group. Some early members of the group originally performed as the Moppets.

In 1970, Ariel separated. Bowen then reunited with former bandmates Brandt and Hooke in 1972, to play at a women's festival, now as the Deadly Nightshade. In 1974, the band secured one of the first record contracts as an all-female band to a major label, Phantom/RCA, and went on to release two albums to mixed reviews. They performed at Ms. Magazine's second annual party in 1974. During the height of their success in the mid-seventies, The Deadly Nightshade appeared on Sesame Street, singing its version of the Carter Family hit "Keep on the Sunny Side", "Old MacDonald Had a Farm," as well as several of the band's own songs.

The band broke up in 1977, when Bowen decided to leave the band to pursue other interests. Brandt went on to work as a feminist writer, co-author of The Girls Next Door: Into the Heart of Lesbian America with Lindsy Van Gelder (Simon & Schuster, 1996). Her work included commentary on the band and its relation to the women's movement and the music business. In 1978 the Smithsonian Institution reissued both albums as examples of creative women in music. Archival material relating to the band can be found at the Country Music Hall of Fame.

The band reunited in 2008, and performed again in 2009.

Rock critic Robert Christgau wrote that despite their being avowed feminists, which he sympathized with, he hated their music as "Squeaky-clean folk rock".

Pamela Brandt, bassist, singer and songwriter (born February 6, 1947) died of a heart attack on July 31, 2015, in Miami, Florida, at age 68.

== Discography ==
=== Albums ===
| Album | Year |
|---|---|
| The Deadly Nightshade | 1975 |
| Funky & Western | 1976 |
| Never Never Gonna Stop | 2012 |

=== Singles ===
- "Mary Hartman, Mary Hartman theme" (disco cover of theme song), ca. 1975
