= The Live Adventures of Mike Bloomfield and Al Kooper =

Live album by Mike Bloomfield & Al Kooper
- Released: January 1969
- Recorded: September 26–28, 1968
- Genre: Rock, blues
- Length: 85:19
- Label: Columbia
- Producer: Al Kooper

Mike Bloomfield & Al Kooper chronology
Super Session (1968)	The Live Adventures of Mike Bloomfield and Al Kooper (1969)	Fillmore East: Al Kooper and Mike Bloomfield - The Lost Concert Tapes 12/13/68 (2003)

The Live Adventures of Mike Bloomfield and Al Kooper is a double album recorded at the Fillmore West venue; the album is a successor to the studio album Super Session, which included Stephen Stills in addition to Bloomfield and Kooper, and had achieved commercial and critical success earlier in 1968. The Globe and Mail described both records as jam session albums.

== Overview ==
The performances, recordings and production cannot be described as flawless; in his sleeve notes, Kooper describes the difficulties of finding rehearsal space, Bloomfield's insomnia, and the failure of a vocal microphone during "Dear Mr Fantasy"; the track "I Wonder Who" is faded during a Bloomfield solo for no apparent reason.

Nevertheless, the album remains an important, if raw, document of a live blues-rock performance of the period and, apart from its intrinsic qualities, is notable not only for one of the earliest live recordings by Carlos Santana but also for Bloomfield's debut as a vocalist. Whilst he is not historically noted in this role, in "Don't Throw Your Love on Me So Strong", according to Kooper, "he displays consummate homage to the traditional guitar-voice trade-offs; a lesson in phrasing and understanding."

Live Adventures has since been re-released on CD but without any additional material beyond its initial release; the concerts took place over three nights, and according to Kooper, for two sets a night; this should have yielded several hours of recordings, of which the album provides just short of ninety minutes.

== Chart performance ==
The album peaked at No. 18 on the Billboard Top LPs chart. On the Cashbox Top 100 Albums chart, it peaked at No. 19.

== Track listing ==
=== Side One ===
1. "Opening Speech" (Mike Bloomfield) – 1:30
2. "The 59th Street Bridge Song (Feelin' Groovy)" (Paul Simon) – 5:38
3. "I Wonder Who" (Ray Charles) – 6:04
4. "Her Holy Modal Highness" (Al Kooper, Mike Bloomfield) – 9:08

=== Side Two ===
1. "The Weight" (Robbie Robertson) – 4:00
2. "Mary Ann" (Ray Charles) – 5:19
3. "Together 'Til the End of Time" (Frank Wilson) – 4:15
4. "That's All Right" (Arthur Crudup) – 3:28
5. "Green Onions" (Booker T. Jones, Steve Cropper, Al Jackson Jr., Lewie Steinberg) – 5:26

=== Side Three ===
1. "Opening Speech" (Al Kooper) – 1:28
2. "Sonny Boy Williamson" (Jack Bruce, Paul Jones) – 6:04
3. "No More Lonely Nights" (Sonny Boy Williamson I) – 12:27

=== Side Four ===
1. "Dear Mr. Fantasy" (Jim Capaldi, Stevie Winwood, Chris Wood) – 8:04
2. "Don't Throw Your Love on Me So Strong" (Albert King) – 10:56
3. "Finale-Refugee" (Al Kooper, Mike Bloomfield) – 2:04

== Album cover ==
The gatefold sleeve features

- on the front cover, a painting of Bloomfield and Kooper by Norman Rockwell.
- on the rear cover, against a background of a montage of crowd scenes (not necessarily from the concert audience), superimposed photographs of the core band and a track listing.
- on the interior, a more detailed track listing, text of Bloomfield's opening speech, and notes by Kooper, as well as other album credits.

According to Kooper, Rockwell's original artwork ended up on the wall of CBS Art Director, John Berg, who later sold it despite Kooper having expressed an interest in having the painting.

== Personnel ==
- Al Kooper – organ, ondioline, piano (overdub as Roosevelt Gook on "Together 'Til the End of Time") and lead vocals
- Mike Bloomfield – guitar and vocals
- John Kahn – bass
- Skip Prokop – drums
- Carlos Santana – guitar on "Sonny Boy Williamson"
- Elvin Bishop – guitar and lead vocal on "No More Lonely Nights"
- Paul Simon - harmony vocal on the final verse of “The Fifty Ninth Bridge Street Song”
- Steve Miller and Dave Brown had also volunteered their services. Kooper says (in his book Backstage Passes & Backstabbing Bastards) that Santana, Bishop and Miller performed on three or four songs each. He says Miller "played great", but does not appear on the album because Capitol Records would not give permission.

== Charts ==
Chart (1969)	Peak position
US Billboard Top LPs	18
US Cashbox Top 100 Albums	19
