= Billy Faier =

American singer-songwriter

- Born: December 21, 1930; Brooklyn, New York City, U.S.
- Died: January 29, 2016 (aged 85) Alpine, Texas, U.S.
- Genre: Folk
- Occupation: Musician
- Instruments: Banjo, guitar
- Labels: Riverside, Takoma
- Formerly of: John Sebastian, The Doodlin' Hogwallops
- Website: billyfaier.com

Billy Faier (December 21, 1930 – January 29, 2016) was an American banjo player and folk music evangelist. He, along with Pete Seeger, was one of the early exponents of the banjo during the mid-20th-century American folk music revival.

== Life ==
Born in Brooklyn, New York, he moved with his family to Woodstock, New York in 1945, and later lived in Marathon, Texas. Active in the Washington Square Park folk scene in Greenwich Village from the late 1940s, he recorded two albums for Riverside Records, The Art of the Five-String Banjo (1957) and Travelin' Man (1958). In 1959 he contributed to Elektra Records' combination LP and instructional manual, "How to Play Folk Guitar" along with Lee Hays and Milt Okun.

Faier performed transcription and notation services for Pete Seeger on several projects, most notably 1959's The Goofing Off Suite. In the late 1950s, Faier wrote for Caravan Folk Music Magazine, eventually acquiring it from founding publisher Lee Hoffman. Faier served as editor and publisher until its last issue in July 1960. Faier was an on-stage banjo player for the original 16-month theatrical run of The Unsinkable Molly Brown on Broadway which concluded in February 1962.

Faier was the central character in Ramblin Jack Elliott's song, 912 Greens, recorded in 1968. The lyrics describe a 1953 musician's get-together at Faire's home at 912 Toulouse Street in New Orleans.

Faier went on to work as a disc jockey at several radio stations including Berkeley's KPFA and New York's WBAI, where he hosted a live folk music program called "The Midnight Special." Bob Dylan appeared as a guest on the program in October 1962 after the release of his first album.

In 1973, Faier recorded Banjo for John Fahey's Takoma label. In 2003, his personal papers as well as some recordings were donated to the University of North Carolina Libraries Southern Folklife Collection where they remain available for researchers. He died in Alpine, Texas, in 2016, aged 85.

== Selected discography ==
In 2009, Faier decided to make much of his out of print and unreleased material available on his website.

- Banjos, Banjos, And More Banjos! with Dick Weissman and Eric Weissberg (Judson, 1957)
- The Art of the Five-String Banjo with Frank Hamilton (Riverside, 1957)
- Travelin' Man (Washington Records, 1958)
- Elektra Folk Song Kit with Mitt Okum (Elektra Records, 1959)
- Election Songs Of The United States with Oscar Brand (Folkways Records, 1960)
- The Beast of Billy Faier with John Sebastian (1964)
- Banjo (1973)
- Children's Songs with Ed McCurdy (Tradition Everest, 1978)
- Banjos, Birdsong and Mother Earth with John Sebastian and Gilles Malkine (1987)
