= Cafe Au Go Go =

Former nightclub in New York City

Coordinates: 40.728295°N 73.999422°W

The Cafe Au Go Go was a night club in Greenwich Village located in the basement of the New Andy Warhol Garrick Theatre building in the late 1960s, at 152 Bleecker Street in Manhattan, New York City. The club featured many musical groups, folk singers and comedy acts between the opening in February 1964 until closing in December 1970. The club was originally owned by Howard Solomon who sold it in June 1969 to Moses Baruch. Howard Solomon became the manager of singer Fred Neil.

== History ==
The club was the first New York City venue for the Grateful Dead. Richie Havens and the Blues Project were weekly regulars as well as Harvey Brooks, who was bass player in residence; the Stone Poneys featuring Linda Ronstadt played frequently; The Grateful Dead played 10 times in 1967 and 3 in 1969; Jimi Hendrix sat in with blues harp player James Cotton there in 1968.

Other notable acts that played at Cafe Au Go Go include: Van Morrison, Tim Hardin, Tim Buckley, Joni Mitchell, Judy Collins, Howlin' Wolf, Muddy Waters, John Lee Hooker, Oscar Brown Jr., the Youngbloods, the Siegel-Schwall Band, John Hammond Jr., the Paul Butterfield Blues Band, the Clear Light, Michael Bloomfield, Jefferson Airplane, Cream, the Chambers Brothers, Canned Heat, the Fugs, Odetta, Country Joe and the Fish, the Yardbirds, the Doors, Blood, Sweat & Tears.

Blues legends John Lee Hooker, Lightnin' Hopkins, Son House, Skip James, Bukka White, and Big Joe Williams performed at the club after being "rediscovered" in the 1960s. Before many rock groups began performing there, the Au Go Go was an oasis for jazz (Bill Evans, Stan Getz), comedy (Lenny Bruce, George Carlin) and folk music.

When the club was sold in 1969 it closed for over a month for renovations including upgrades to the kitchen and a new sound system installed by a then-local audio engineer Kenny D'Alessandro. Van Morrison was the first artist to play at the re-opened club in August 1969, having just released his album Astral Weeks.

=== Au Go Go Singers and comedians ===
In 1964, Solomon brought in a large group of singers and musicians from an off-Broadway show and christened them the Au Go Go Singers, to rival the Bitter End Singers across the street at The Bitter End Cafe. Solomon managed the group until their breakup in late 1965.

The Au Go Go Singers included Kathy King (who later toured with Bobby Vinton and appeared in the Broadway show Oh Calcutta and currently works as Kathrin King Segal), Jean Gurney, Michael Scott (who later performed with the Highwaymen and the Serendipity Singers), Rick (Frederic) Geiger (who eventually was accepted into a light opera company in California), Roy Michaels (who later performed with Cat Mother & the All Night Newsboys and toured with Jimi Hendrix), Nels Gustafson, Bob Harmelink, and soloists Stephen Stills and Richie Furay. (Gustafson and Harmelink had been in an earlier trio with Furay, but quit show business after the demise of the Au Go Go Singers.)

It was also at the Cafe Au Go Go that a new folk/rock group, The Company, was formed from some remnants of the Au Go Go Singers: Geiger, Michaels, Scott & Gurney (who together before the Au Go Go Singers performed as the Bay Singers, a popular group in Boston & New York City), and Stills. Immediately after the Au Go Go Singers breakup, the Rollins and Joffe Talent Agency—managers of Dick Cavett, Woody Allen, and other notables—heard a reunion of the Bay Singers at the Cafe Au Go Go and offered the group a six-week Canadian tour. Rollins and Joffe did not originally include Stills on the tour, but Stills made it known to the Bay Singers that he wanted to join their group and the tour.

Very comfortable in performing their arrangements and songs they perfected on their radio show and performances before joining the Au Go Go Singers, and knowing that Jack Rollins and Charlie Joffe offered the tour based on the Singers' performance, most of the Bay Singers were hesitant to add another member, but ultimately gave in to Stills. The new quintet switched to amplified instruments, took about a week to learn new material (some under the direction of the former Au Go Go Singers arranger, Jim Friedman), named their new group The Company, and then headed for Ontario. While on tour the group first met Neil Young, who was performing with the Squires, as the opening act for The Company. After leaving Canada The Company played at Mr. Kelly's in Chicago where Woody Allen was headlining. In less than a year after the group broke up, Stills, Young, Richie Furay, and two others formed Buffalo Springfield.

=== Comedians and Lenny Bruce arrests ===
Howard Solomon not only had the Au Go Go Singers, but had also booked comedians such as George Carlin and Lenny Bruce, who had regular stints at Cafe Au Go Go that would last either from one or two days to three weeks. Lenny Bruce's performances at the Go Go were controversial. In April 1964, Bruce appeared twice at the Cafe Au Go Go with undercover police detectives in the audience. On both occasions, he was arrested after leaving the stage, the complaints pertaining to his use of various obscenities. Club owner Howard Solomon was arrested too.

A three-judge panel presided over the widely publicized six-month trial, with Bruce and club owner Howard Solomon both found guilty of obscenity on November 4, 1964. The conviction was announced despite positive testimony and petitions of support from Woody Allen, Bob Dylan, Jules Feiffer, Allen Ginsberg, Norman Mailer, William Styron, and James Baldwin – among other artists, writers and educators, and from Manhattan journalist and television personality Dorothy Kilgallen and sociologist Herbert Gans. Bruce was sentenced on December 21, 1964, to four months in the workhouse. He was set free on bail during the appeals process and died before the appeal was decided. Solomon later saw his conviction overturned.

By 1966, the police and the courts had managed to silence Lenny Bruce and taught him a lesson that he should not use "foul language" or show disrespect for the church and the law, eventually bankrupting him just before his death that year. Though the police had managed to silence Lenny Bruce, George Carlin continued to do his controversial comedy. Carlin eventually went on to have his own trouble with the law. Controversy arose because of the use of obscenities in his counter-culture routine known at the "Seven Dirty Words". Both Lenny Bruce and George Carlin were two of the most influential stand-up comedians of their time and they along with many others had come out of the Cafe Au Go Go.

On December 23, 2003, 37 years after his death, Bruce was granted a posthumous pardon for his obscenity conviction by New York Governor George Pataki, following a petition filed by Ronald Collins and David Skover with Robert Corn-Revere as counsel, the petition having been signed by several stars such as Robin Williams. It was the first posthumous pardon in the state's history. Pataki said his act was "a declaration of New York's commitment to upholding the First Amendment."

When the Cafe au Go Go closed, the now-famous Stephen Stills was a featured performer at the gala closing.

== Current use ==
The Cafe Au Go Go and the related New Andy Warhol Garrick Theatre buildings were demolished in the 1970s.

== See also ==
- Gerde's Folk City
- Live at The Cafe Au Go Go
- New Andy Warhol Garrick Theatre
- The Bitter End
- The Gaslight Cafe
