= Al Kooper =

American songwriter, record producer and musician (born 1944)

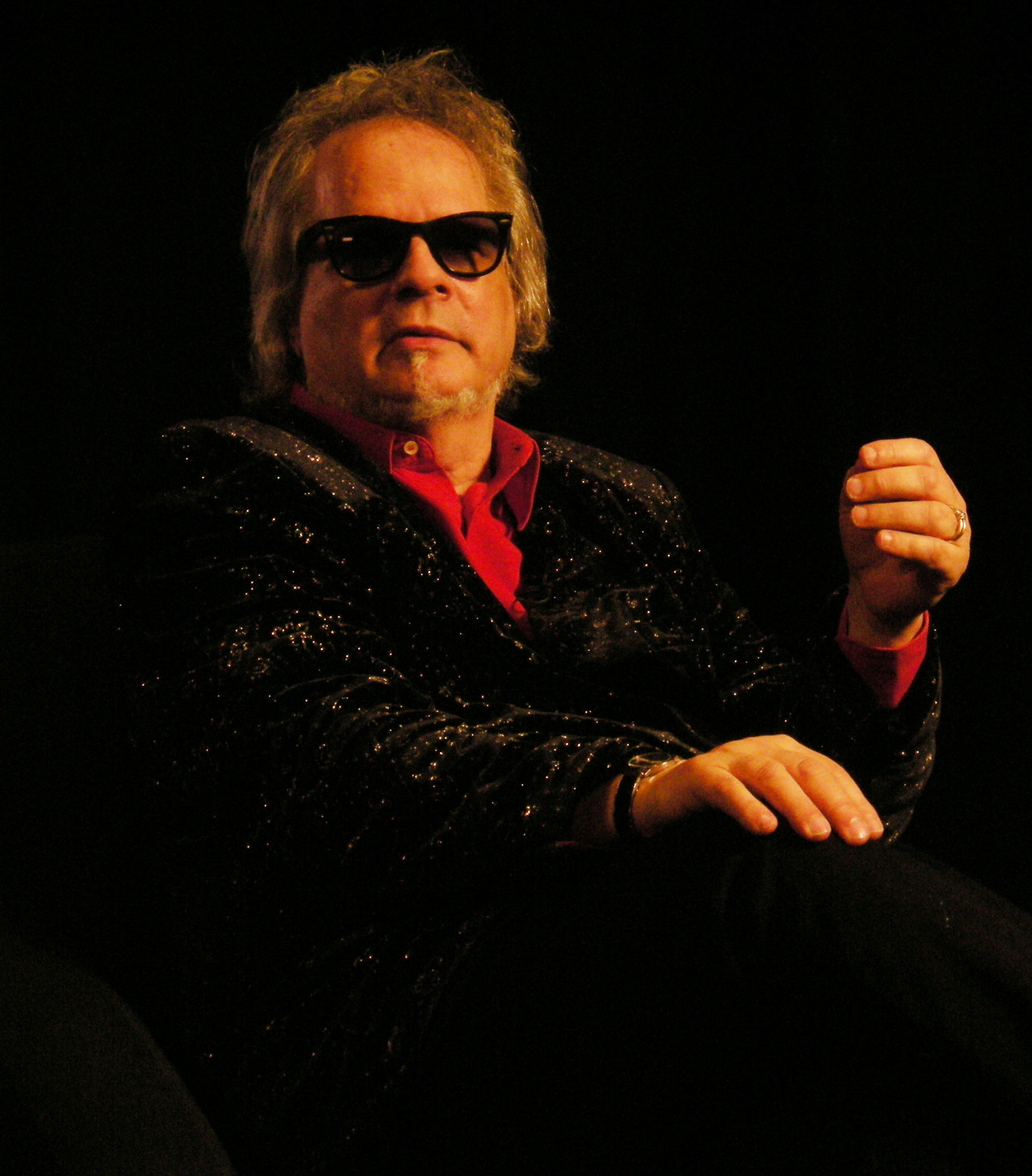
- Kooper in 2009

Background information
- Also known as: Roosevelt Gook
- Born: Alan Peter Kuperschmidt; February 5, 1944 (age 82); New York City, U.S.
- Genres: Blues; R&B; pop; rock
- Occupations: Musician; songwriter; producer
- Instruments: Keyboards; guitar; bass
- Years active: 1958–present
- Labels: ABC; Columbia; United Artists
- Formerly of: The Blues Project; Blood, Sweat & Tears; The Royal Teens
- Website: alkooper.com

Al Kooper (born Alan Peter Kuperschmidt; February 5, 1944) is an American songwriter, record producer, and musician. Throughout much of the 1960s and 1970s he was a prolific studio musician, including playing organ on the Bob Dylan song "Like a Rolling Stone", French horn and piano on the Rolling Stones song "You Can't Always Get What You Want", and lead guitar on Rita Coolidge's "The Lady's Not for Sale". He also formed and named Blood, Sweat & Tears, though he did not stay with the group long enough to share in its subsequent popularity. Kooper produced a number of one-off collaboration albums, such as the Super Session album that saw him work separately with guitarists Mike Bloomfield and Stephen Stills.

In the 1970s Kooper was a successful manager and producer, recording Lynyrd Skynyrd's first three albums. He has had a successful solo career, writing music for film soundtracks, and has lectured in musical composition. Kooper was selected for induction to the Rock and Roll Hall of Fame in 2023.

== Early life ==
Kooper was born Alan Peter Kuperschmidt in Brooklyn, New York City, on February 5, 1944. He grew up in a Jewish family in Hollis Hills, Queens.

== Career ==
=== Professional debut ===
Kooper's first professional work was as a 14-year-old guitarist in the Royal Teens, best known for their 1958 ABC Records novelty song "Short Shorts" (although Kooper did not play on that recording). In 1960, he teamed up with songwriters Bob Brass and Irwin Levine to write and record demos for Sea-Lark Music Publishing. The trio's biggest hits were "This Diamond Ring", recorded by Gary Lewis and the Playboys, and "I Must Be Seeing Things", recorded by Gene Pitney (both 1965). When he was 21, Kooper moved to Greenwich Village in Manhattan.

=== With Bob Dylan ===
He first performed with Bob Dylan playing the Hammond organ riffs on "Like a Rolling Stone". He had been invited to watch the recording by producer Tom Wilson. In those recording sessions, Kooper met and befriended Mike Bloomfield, whose guitar playing he admired. He worked with Bloomfield for several years. In 1965, Kooper played with Dylan in concert and played Hammond organ with Dylan at the Newport Folk Festival and in the recording studio in 1965 and 1966. He played organ once again with Dylan during his 1981 world tour.

=== The Blues Project and Blood, Sweat & Tears ===
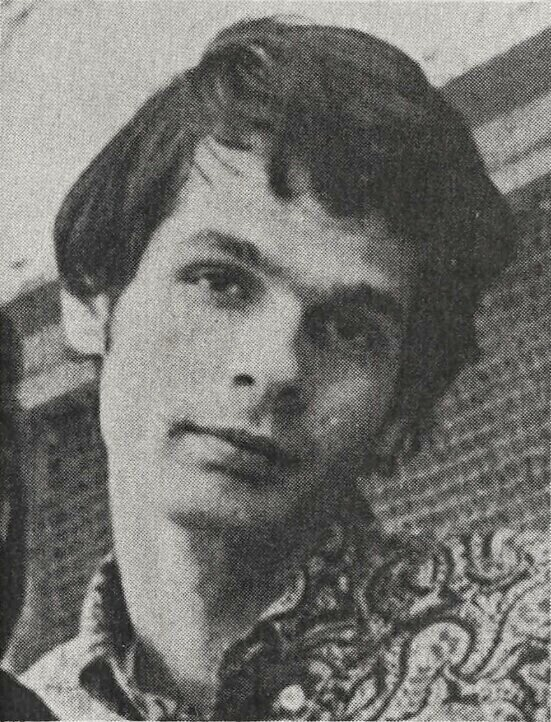
Kooper with the Blues Project, c. 1966

Kooper joined the Blues Project as their keyboardist in 1965. He left the band shortly before their gig at the Monterey Pop Festival in 1967, although he did play a solo set, as evidenced by The Criterion Collection Blu-ray extended edition of the event. He formed Blood, Sweat & Tears in 1967, leaving due to creative differences in 1968, after the release of the group's first album, Child Is Father to the Man. He recorded Super Session with Bloomfield and Stephen Stills in 1968, and in 1969 he collaborated with 15-year-old guitarist Shuggie Otis on the album Kooper Session. In 1972, he rejoined The Blues Project at a charity concert promoted by Bruce Blakeman at Valley Stream Central High School.

=== Other work ===
==== As musician ====
Kooper has played on hundreds of records, including ones by the Rolling Stones, B.B. King, the Who, the Jimi Hendrix Experience, Alice Cooper, and Cream. On occasion he overdubbed his own efforts, as on The Live Adventures of Mike Bloomfield and Al Kooper and other albums, under the pseudonym "Roosevelt Gook".

==== As record producer ====
In 1969, Kooper produced, arranged, and conducted the album Appaloosa, a "folk-baroque" style of music that combined rock and classical. Among other artists who were all arranging folk-oriented material with classical-influenced orchestration were Judy Collins, Donovan, Tim Hardin, and Tom Rush. Kooper was joined by Boston musicians John Parker Compton, singer and acoustic guitarist, Robin Batteau on violin, Eugene Rosov on cello, and David Reiser on electric bass. Contributing to the album was saxophonist Fred Lipsius and Blood, Sweat & Tears drummer Bobby Colomby. After moving to Atlanta in 1972, he discovered the band Lynyrd Skynyrd, and produced and performed on their first three albums, including the singles "Sweet Home Alabama" and "Free Bird". In 1975 he produced the debut album of the Tubes.

==== TV and Film Scores ====
Kooper wrote the scores for the TV series Crime Story and the films The Landlord and King of the Corner, as well as several made-for-television movies. He was the musical force behind many pop tunes, including "You're the Lovin' End", for The Banana Splits, a children's television program.

==== Studio ====
In the late 1980s, Kooper had his own dedicated keyboard studio in the historic Sound Emporium recording studio in Nashville, next to Studio B.

==== Rock Bottom Remainders ====
Kooper's status as a published author enabled him to join (and act as musical director of) the Rock Bottom Remainders, a band made up of writers including Dave Barry, Barbara Kingsolver, Stephen King, Amy Tan, and Matt Groening.

==== New Music For Old People ====
Kooper wrote a column called "New Music For Old People" for the online publication The Morton Report from April 2014 to April 2015. This later led to a radio show by the same name, which began in October 2018, for Martha's Vineyard community radio station WVVY-LP. The first 11 editions can be found online.

==== Magazine writer ====
Kooper profiled Steve Martin for Crawdaddy magazine in 1977.

==== Kooperkast ====
Kooper's podcast, Kooperkast, started in late 2020. Hosted by webmaster Jon Sachs, Kooper discusses his experiences in his more than 60 years in the music industry, including his solo albums, Bob Dylan and Lynyrd Skynyrd. He answers questions that can be submitted on the Kooperkast page on his website.

=== Honors, awards, and legacy ===
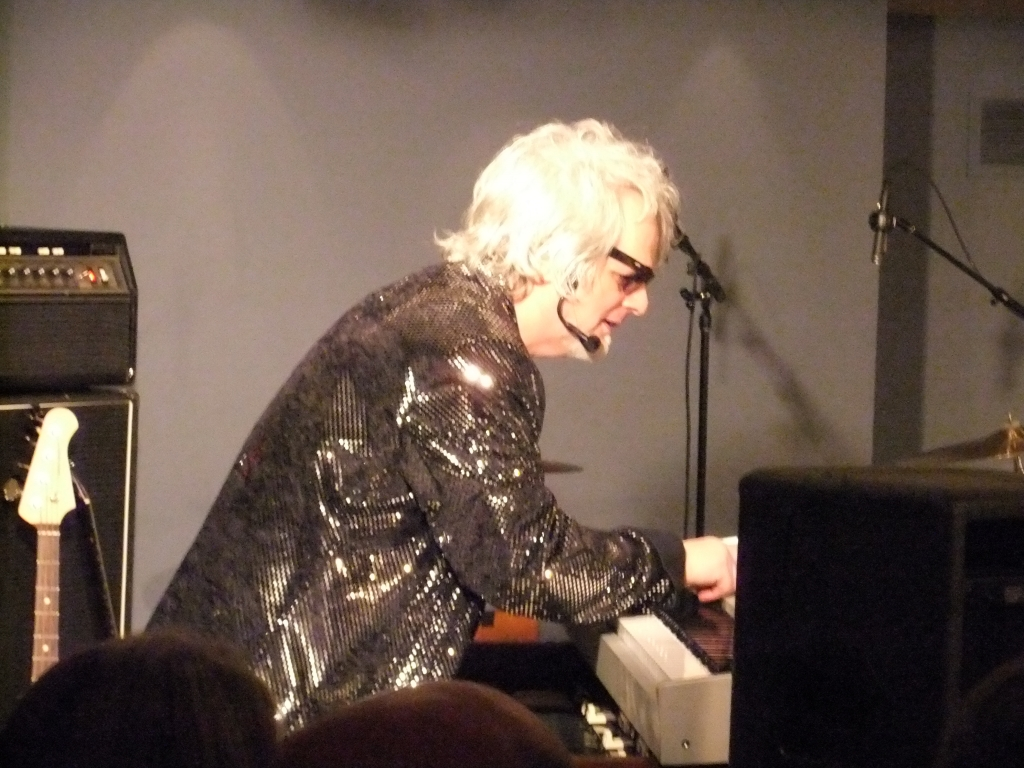
Kooper celebrating his 68th birthday at the Regatta Bar in Cambridge, Massachusetts, on February 4, 2012

In May 2001, Kooper was awarded an Honorary Doctorate of Music from Berklee College of Music in Boston. He taught songwriting and recording production there. He plays weekend concerts with his bands the ReKooperators and the Funky Faculty. In 2008, he participated in the production of the album Psalngs, the debut release of Canadian musician John Lefebvre.

Kooper was inducted into the Musicians Hall of Fame and Museum, in Nashville, in 2008.

In 2005, Martin Scorsese produced a documentary titled No Direction Home: Bob Dylan for the PBS American Masters Series, in which Kooper's contributions are recognized.

In 2023, Kooper was selected for induction into the Rock and Roll Hall of Fame in the Award for Musical Excellence category.

== Memoir ==
Kooper published a memoir, Backstage Passes: Rock 'n' Roll Life in the Sixties (1977), which was revised and published as Backstage Passes and Backstabbing Bastards: Memoirs of a Rock 'n' Roll Survivor (1998). The revised edition includes indictments of "manipulators" in the music industry, including his one-time business manager, Stan Polley. An updated edition, including supplementary material, was published by Backbeat Books in 2008.

== Discography ==
=== Solo ===
==== Studio albums ====
- I Stand Alone (February 1969)
- You Never Know Who Your Friends Are (October 1969)
- Easy Does It (September 1970)
- New York City (You're a Woman) (June 1971)
- A Possible Projection of the Future / Childhood's End (April 1972)
- Naked Songs (1973)
- Act Like Nothing's Wrong (January 1977)
- Championship Wrestling (featuring Jeff "Skunk" Baxter) (1982)
- Rekooperation (June 1994)
- Black Coffee (August 2005)
- White Chocolate (2008)

==== Live albums ====
- Soul of a Man (February 1995)

==== Soundtracks ====
- The Landlord: Original Motion Picture Soundtrack (with the Staple Singers and Lorraine Ellison)

==== Compilation albums ====
- Al's Big Deal – Unclaimed Freight (An Al Kooper Anthology) (1975)
- Rare and Well Done: The Greatest and Most Obscure Recordings 1964–2001 (2001)
- 50/50 (50 Tracks/50 Years) (2008)

=== Collaborations ===
- Super Session (with Stephen Stills and Mike Bloomfield) (1968)
- The Live Adventures of Mike Bloomfield and Al Kooper (February 1969)
- Fillmore East: The Lost Concert Tapes 12/13/68 (with Mike Bloomfield, recorded 1968, issued April 2003)
- Kooper Session: Super Session Vol. 2 (with Shuggie Otis) (1969)
- Johnnie B. Live (with Johnnie Johnson) (1997)

=== Other appearances ===
Year	Artist	Album name	Role(s)
1965	Bob Dylan	Highway 61 Revisited	Piano, organ
1966	Bob Dylan	Blonde on Blonde	Organ, guitar
1966	Tom Rush	Take a Little Walk with Me	Electric guitar, celesta, liner notes
1966	The Blues Project	Live at The Cafe Au Go Go	Organ, vocals
1966	The Blues Project	Projections	Keyboards, vocals
1967	The Blues Project	The Blues Project Live at Town Hall	Keyboards
1967	The Who	The Who Sell Out	Organ
1968	Blood, Sweat and Tears	Child is Father to the Man	Organ, piano, vocals, ondioline
1968	The Jimi Hendrix Experience	Electric Ladyland	Piano
1968	Don Ellis	Autumn	Producer
1969	Don Ellis	The New Don Ellis Band Goes Underground	Producer
1969	The Rolling Stones	Let It Bleed	piano, French horn and organ
1969	B.B. King	Live & Well	Piano
1970	Bob Dylan	Self Portrait	Guitar, horn, keyboards
1970	Bob Dylan	New Morning	Organ, piano, electric guitar, French horn
1971	The Who	Who's Next	Hammond organ
1971	Bo Diddley	Another Dimension	Keyboards, guitar
1971	Rita Coolidge	Nice Feelin'	Organ
1972	Rita Coolidge	The Lady's Not for Sale	Lead guitar
1973	Betty Wright	Hard To Stop	Arranger, composer, keyboards, main personnel
1973	Frankie & Johnny (Note: Al Kooper, Frank Ruby and John Paul Fetta.)	The Sweetheart Sampler	Producer
1973	Atlanta Rhythm Section	Back Up Against the Wall	Synthesiser, ARP
1973	Lynyrd Skynyrd	Pronounced Leh-Nerd Skin-Nerd	Producer, engineer, bass, Mellotron, back-up harmony, mandolin, bass drum, organ
1974	Lynyrd Skynyrd	Second Helping	Producer, backing vocals, piano
1974	Roger McGuinn	Peace on You	Guitar, piano, clavinet, arrangements, conductor
1975	Lynyrd Skynyrd	Nuthin' Fancy	Producer
1975	The Tubes	The Tubes	Producer
1979	Leo Sayer	Here	Organ, synthesizer, keyboards, performer
1979	4 on the Floor	4 on the Floor	Producer
1981	George Harrison	Somewhere in England	Keyboards, synthesisers
1981	Ringo Starr	Stop and Smell the Roses	Piano, electric guitar
1985	Bob Dylan	Empire Burlesque	Rhythm guitar
1986	Bob Dylan	Knocked Out Loaded	Keyboards
1989	Roy Orbison	Mystery Girl	Organ
1990	Bob Dylan	Under the Red Sky	Hammond organ, keyboards
1991	Dave Sharp	Hard Traveling	Guest artist
1991	Green On Red	Scapegoats	Producer
1996	Neil Diamond	Tennessee Moon	Hammond organ
1998	Phoebe Snow	I Can't Complain	Guest artist, Hammond organ
2000	Dan Penn	Blue Nite Lounge	Keyboards
2000	Peter Parcek	Evolution	Keyboards
2003	Chris Catena	Freak Out	Guest artist, Keyboards
2010	Peter Parcek	The Mathematics of Love	Keyboards

==== Sources ====
- Mike Bloomfield, Me and Big Joe, Re/Search Publications, 1999, ISBN 1-889307-05-X, ISBN 978-1-889307-05-3.
- Jan Mark Wolkin and Bill Keenom, Michael Bloomfield -- If You Love These Blues: An Oral History, Backbeat Books, 2000, ISBN 978-0-87930-617-5 (with CD of unissued music).
- Ken Brooks, The Adventures of Mike Bloomfield and Al Kooper with Paul Butterfield and David Clayton Thomas, Agenda, 1999, ISBN 1-899882-90-1, ISBN 978-1-899882-90-8.
- Al Kooper, Backstage Passes: Rock 'n' Roll Life in the Sixties, Stein & Day, 1977, ISBN 0-8128-2171-8, ISBN 978-0-8128-2171-0.
- Al Kooper, Backstage Passes and Backstabbing Bastards: Memoirs of a Rock 'n' Roll Survivor (updated ed.), Billboard Books, 1998, ISBN 0-8230-8257-1, ISBN 978-0823082575.
- Al Kooper, Backstage Passes and Backstabbing Bastards (new ed.), Hal Leonard, 2008, ISBN 0-87930-922-9, ISBN 978-0-87930-922-0.
- Ed Ward, Michael Bloomfield: The Rise and Fall of an American Guitar Hero, Cherry Lane Books,1983, ISBN 0-89524-157-9, ISBN 978-0895241573.
