= Danny Kalb =

American blues guitarist (1942–2022)

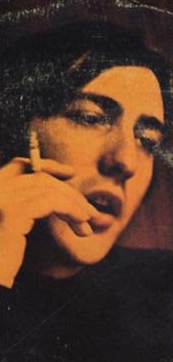
- Kalb in 1966

Background information
- Born: Daniel Ira Kalb; September 9, 1942; Mount Vernon, New York, U.S.
- Died: November 19, 2022 (aged 80) Brooklyn, New York, U.S.
- Genres: Rock, blues
- Occupation: Musician
- Instruments: Guitar; vocals
- Years active: 1960s–2022

Daniel Ira Kalb (September 9, 1942 – November 19, 2022) was an American blues guitarist and vocalist. He was an original member of the 1960s group the Blues Project.

== Life and career ==
Kalb was a protégé of Dave Van Ronk and became a solo performer and a session musician, performing with such folk singers as Judy Collins, Phil Ochs, Pete Seeger and Bob Dylan. Kalb and the blues ethnomusicologist Sam Charters formed the New Strangers. He joined Van Ronk's Ragtime Jug Stompers in 1963. Inspired by the African-American bluesmen Son House, Skip James and Mississippi John Hurt, Kalb experimented with acoustic and electronic music.

At the age of 15 Kalb formed the band Gay Notes and performed with Bob Dylan on a WBAI-FM concert broadcast in 1961. In 1963 Kalb performed in the Ragtime Jug Stompers with his mentor Dave Van Ronk. In 1964 he recorded as Folk Stringers, produced by guitarist and writer Sam Charters, who has written: "It was generally conceded ... that ... Kalb was the most exciting of the new players.". In 1964 Kalb played second guitar on Phil Ochs's album All the News That's Fit to Sing and in 1964 appeared on Judy Collins's Fifth Album.

In 1965, Kalb formed the Blues Project with Steve Katz, Andy Kulberg, Roy Blumenfeld and Tommy Flanders. Flanders later left the band and was replaced by Al Kooper. They recorded three albums, played frequently at the Cafe Au Go Go and at Murray the K's last "submarine race-watching" spectacular at the RKO 58th Street theater in New York, and made several concert tours, disbanding in 1971. In 1965 the Blues Project performed an eleven-minute rendition of Muddy Waters's "Two Trains Running" in electronic form, with Waters in the audience. When asked what he thought of it, Waters said, "You really got me." Kalb later said, "If I'd dropped dead at that point on the spot because of what we thought of Muddy Waters, then my life would have been well spent." Personality clashes, drugs and the 1960s lifestyle took their toll on the band. Katz and Kooper left to form Blood, Sweat and Tears.

Howard L. Solomon (Cafe au Go Go owner and promoter) wrote in a 1999 email to Kalb's Webmaster, "Danny Kalb ... is up there with the best of all blues legends ... His work for me at Cafe' au Go Go was amazing ... I've worked with the greatest of all time and he is at the top ... Eric Clapton, Mick Taylor, Jimi Hendrix, John Mayall, Zappa, all greats, but Danny will emerge in the top 5."

In 1968 he released Crosscurrents with Stefan Grossman. He was fairly quiet for the next twenty years, but joined Al Kooper for a Blues Project reunion, recorded at the Bottom Line in 1996.

In the 21st century, Kalb performed solo acoustic gigs, played acoustic and electric music with the Danny Kalb Trio, including Bob Jones on acoustic bass and Mark Ambrosino on drums and occasionally performed with Stefan Grossman and Steve Katz and with his brother Jonathan Kalb. The Danny Kalb Trio recorded I'm Gonna Live the Life I Sing About (Sojourn) in 2008, which received critical acclaim in the blues media. This was followed in 2013 by Kalb's first double-CD. Moving in Blue, also on the Sojourn label, featuring various sidemen and guest artists. With this album he parlayed the full range of his musical interests and creativity.

Kalb continued to play the vintage early 1960s Gibson J-200 with which he began his career. He also used a Mexican-made Martin acoustic-electric and a Greco Les Paul-style electric guitar. His solo projects included Livin' with the Blues (Legend 1995), All Together Now( self-released 2002), Live in Princeton (self-released 2003), and Live in Brooklyn (self-released 2006). Crosscurrents, the 1968 LP with Stefan Grossman was re-released as CD in 2006 and a new CD, Played a Little Fiddle, was released in 2007 by Kalb, Katz and Grossman.

Kalb died on November 19, 2022, at the age of 80.

== Discography ==
- 1963 True Endeavor Jug Band The Art Of The Jug Band with Sam Charters - Danny Kalb - Artie Traum
- 1964 The New Strangers Meet The New Strangers with Sam Charters - Danny Kalb
- 1964 The Folk Stringers with Barry Kornfeld - Danny Kalb - Artie Rose
- 1964 Dave Van Ronk and the Rag Time Jug Stompers with Dave Van Ronk, Danny Kalb, Sam Charters, and Artie Rose
- 1964 The Blues Project (Elektra Records) Various artists
- 1968 Crosscurrents with Danny Kalb and Stefan Grossman
- 1995 Livin' With The Blues
- 2003 All Together, Now
- 2007 Played a Little Fiddle Stefan Grossman, Danny Kalb and Steve Katz
- 2008 I'm Gonna Live The Life I Sing About with Bob Jones and Mark Ambrosino
- 2013 Moving in Blue (double-CD, with various sidemen and guests)
