= Super Session =

Studio album by Mike Bloomfield, Al Kooper & Stephen Stills
- Released: July 22, 1968
- Recorded: May 1968
- Genres: Blues, rock
- Length: 50:11
- Label: Columbia
- Producer: Al Kooper

Mike Bloomfield chronology
Super Session (1968)	It's Not Killing Me (1969)

Al Kooper chronology
Super Session (1968)	I Stand Alone (1969)

Stephen Stills chronology
Super Session (1968)	Stephen Stills (1970)

Mike Bloomfield and Al Kooper chronology
Super Session (1968)	The Live Adventures of Mike Bloomfield and Al Kooper (1969)

Professional ratings
Review scores
Source	Rating
AllMusic	4.5/5 stars
The Encyclopedia of Popular Music	4/5 stars
Rolling Stone	(positive)

Super Session is an album by the singer and multi-instrumentalist Al Kooper, with the guitarists Mike Bloomfield on the first half and Stephen Stills on the second half. Released by Columbia Records in 1968, it peaked at No. 12 on the Billboard 200 during a 37-week chart stay and was certified gold by RIAA.

== Background ==
Al Kooper and Mike Bloomfield had worked together on the sessions for Bob Dylan's ground-breaking classic Highway 61 Revisited, and played in the backing band for his controversial performance with electric instruments at the Newport Folk Festival in July 1965. Kooper had recently left Blood, Sweat & Tears after they recorded their debut album, and was now working as an A&R man for Columbia Records. Bloomfield was about to leave The Electric Flag, and at a loose end. Kooper telephoned Bloomfield to see if he was free to come down to the studio and jam; Bloomfield agreed, leaving Kooper to handle the arrangements.

Kooper booked two days of studio time at CBS Columbia Square in Los Angeles in May 1968, and recruited keyboardist Barry Goldberg and bassist Harvey Brooks, both members of the Electric Flag, along with well-known session drummer "Fast" Eddie Hoh. On the first day, the quintet recorded a group of mostly blues-based instrumental tracks. It included the modal excursion "His Holy Modal Majesty", which was a tribute to modal jazz musician John Coltrane, who had died the previous year, and was also reminiscent of "East-West" from the second Butterfield Blues Band album. On the second day, with the tapes ready to roll, Bloomfield returned to his home in Mill Valley in the San Francisco Bay Area, saying he had been unable to sleep.

Needing to have something to show for the second day of booked studio time, Kooper hastily called upon Stephen Stills, who was in the process of leaving his band, Buffalo Springfield, to replace Bloomfield. Regrouping behind Stills, Kooper's session men cut mostly vocal tracks, including "It Takes a Lot to Laugh, It Takes a Train to Cry" from Highway 61 and a lengthy and atmospheric take of "Season of the Witch" by Donovan. Although Harvey Brooks's closing "Harvey's Tune" includes overdubbed horns added in New York City while the album was being mixed, the album only cost $13,000 to complete.

The success of the album opened the door for the "supergroup" concept of the late 1960s and 1970s, as exemplified by the likes of Blind Faith and Crosby, Stills & Nash. Despite the fact that Bloomfield left the recording session after the first day, he and Kooper made several concert appearances after the album was released. The results of one of those became the album The Live Adventures of Mike Bloomfield and Al Kooper.

== Releases ==
Along with the stereo version, Super Session was released as a 4-channel quadraphonic version in the 1970s. The quadraphonic version was released on SQ matrix encoded vinyl and discrete 8-track cartridge tape. On April 8, 2003, Legacy Records reissued the album on compact disc with four bonus tracks, including both an outtake and a live track with Bloomfield, and two with the horn overdubs mixed out.

In the early 2000s, it was intended that it would be remixed for the new 5.1 channel version to be released on SACD. But in late 2004, Al Kooper commented:

To the best of my knowledge, based on an unnamed source, the new head of SONY/BMG shut down the 5.1 SACD department and let everyone go. A year and a half ago I remixed Super Session and Child Is Father to the Man for them in 5.1 SACD. They both came out incredible and so I mastered them with Bob Ludwig. Now it seems they will languish on the shelves under the current administration of SONY/BMG ...Typical, in soooo many ways."

Both 5.1 remixed SACDs were released in 2014 by Audio Fidelity. The original quadraphonic mix of Super Session was released on Hybrid SACD by Sony Records Int'l in 2023.

== Legacy ==
In their retrospective review, Lindsay Planer of AllMusic comments on the album's original impact:

"As the Beatles' Sgt. Pepper's Lonely Hearts Club Band (1967) had done a year earlier, Super Session (1968) initially ushered in several new phases in rock & roll's concurrent transformation. In the space of months, the soundscape of rock shifted radically from short, danceable pop songs to comparatively longer works with more attention to technical and musical subtleties."

The album has been compared to other albums of jam sessions of the era, namely Moby Grape's Grape Jam (1968), George Harrison's Apple Jam (1970) and members of the Rolling Stones (with Ry Cooder and Nicky Hopkins) with Jamming with Edward! (1971). Don Ottenhoff of The Grand Rapids Press, writing in 1971, questioned the idea of "musicians getting together and just letting the tapes run", adding that although Super Session and Grape Jam were "more musically solid than most jam records, they both were tinged with an element of tediousness."

In 2005, Dan Daley of Sound on Sound credited Super Session for "[putting] the jazz-based notion of the jam session squarely into the mainstream of rock." Daley praised Stills for accepting Kooper's invitation to join the jam, saying it "turned what would have been a musically astute jam session record into an all-star record event, laying the groundwork for a slew of 'supergroups' to come."

== Track listing ==
Side one
No.	Title	Writer(s)	Length
1.	"Albert's Shuffle"	Al Kooper, Mike Bloomfield	6:43
2.	"Stop"	Jerry Ragovoy, Mort Shuman	4:23
3.	"Man's Temptation"	Curtis Mayfield	3:25
4.	"His Holy Modal Majesty"	Kooper, Bloomfield	9:13
5.	"Really"	Kooper, Bloomfield	5:29

Side two
No.	Title	Writer(s)	Length
1.	"It Takes a Lot to Laugh, It Takes a Train to Cry"	Bob Dylan	3:30
2.	"Season of the Witch"	Donovan Leitch	11:07
3.	"You Don't Love Me"	Willie Cobbs	4:12
4.	"Harvey's Tune"	Harvey Brooks	2:09
Total length:			50:11

2003 reissue bonus tracks
No.	Title	Writer(s)	Length
10.	"Albert's Shuffle" (2002 remix without horns)	Kooper, Bloomfield	6:58
11.	"Season of the Witch" (2002 remix without horns)	Donovan Leitch	11:07
12.	"Blues for Nothing" (outtake)	Kooper	4:15
13.	"Fat Grey Cloud" (in concert at the Fillmore West, 1968)	Kooper, Bloomfield	4:38

== Personnel ==
- Al Kooper – vocals, piano, Hammond organ, Ondioline, electric guitar, twelve-string guitar
- Mike Bloomfield – electric guitar on side one, reissue tracks 10, 12, 13
- Stephen Stills – electric guitar on side two, reissue track 11
- Barry Goldberg – electric piano on "Albert's Shuffle" and "Stop"
- Harvey Brooks – bass guitar
- Eddie Hoh – drums, percussion

Additional personnel

- Horn section – unknown session players; arranged by Al Kooper and Joe Scott
- Fred Catero, Roy Halee – engineering
- Martin Greenblatt – digital mastering

== Charts ==
Chart performance for Super Session
Chart (1968–69)	Peak position
US Billboard Top LPs	12
Canadian RPM 100 Albums	15
Dutch Hitparade	18
US Cash Box Top 100 Albums	18
US Record World Album Chart	14
Chart (1972)	Peak position
Spanish Album Charts	25
Chart (2003)	Peak position
Italian Album Charts	87

== Certification ==
Region	Certification	Certified units/sales
United States (RIAA)	Gold	500,000^{^}
^{^} Shipments figures based on certification alone.
