= Chespirito Media Universe =

Media franchise and shared fictional universe based on Chespirito characters

- Created by: Grupo Chespirito; THR3 Media Group
- Owner: Roberto Gómez Fernández

Films and television
- Films: Untitled animated El Chapulín Colorado film; Untitled animated La Chicharra film
- Television series: Chespirito: Sin querer queriendo; Untitled animated El Chavo series

Official website
- www.chespirito.com

The Chespirito Media Universe is a Mexican media franchise and shared universe centered on several films and series produced by Grupo Chespirito and THR3 Media Group, and based on several shows and characters created by Mexican comedian Chespirito. The franchise will also include comic books. The franchise will begin with a biographical series about Chespirito, and will include an animated El Chapulín Colorado film and an animated series based on El Chavo.

== Development ==
On October 14, 2019, Roberto Gómez Fernández revealed that Grupo Chespirito and THR3 Media Group are developing a shared universe centered on characters created by his father, Roberto Gómez Bolaños, also known as Chespirito. The franchise, called the "Chespirito Media Universe", will start with a biopic television series about the life of Chespirito, and will include an animated television series based on El Chavo, and an animated film based on El Chapulín Colorado, the latter which was first announced in 2017. Grupo Telefilms signed a deal to serve as a third-party producer on the Chespirito Media Universe.

THR3 Media Group CEO Bruce Boren said that Grupo Chespirto and THR3 Media Group will "develop and design a cinematic universe based on the characters of Roberto that have grown and enjoyed stellar distribution and success worldwide due to the high level of production, the family values demonstrated and the type of comedy very easy to understand and resonates with all cultures", while Gómez Fernández said that "when he met the team at Telefilms and Thr3 Media, he knew he had found what Group Chespirto wanted", stating that "they are brave enough to meet the challenge of making this series, and any other future projects, as good as any production in the world".

In June 2021, Gómez Fernández said that Grupo Chespirito is currently planning several animated and live-action projects based on Chespirito's work, but they currently lack a release date due to a fallout between Grupo Chespirito and Televisa, which left past and future Chespirito-related projects without a distribution company. The same month, Florinda Meza, Chespirito's widow, started taking legal actions to take creative control of all Chespirito-based projects. Her lawyer, Guillermo Pous, later explained that the rights for Chespirito's characters will remain with Gómez Fernández, while intellectual use of Chespirito's image will belong to Meza.

== Films ==
| Film | Mexican release date | U.S. release date | Director | Screenwriter(s) | Producer(s) |
|---|---|---|---|---|---|
| Untitled animated El Chapulín Colorado film | TBA | TBA | TBA | Roberto Gómez Fernández | TBA |
| Untitled animated La Chicharra film | TBA | TBA | TBA | Roberto Gómez Fernández | TBA |

=== Untitled animated El Chapulín Colorado film (TBA) ===
On May 10, 2017, it was reported that an untitled animated film based on El Chapulín Colorado is in development. Roberto Gómez Fernández will write the screenplay. Work on the screenplay began by October 2019. On October 14, 2019, Gómez Fernández revealed that the film has entered production, and that it will take place in the Chespirito Media Universe.

=== Other films ===
Another untitled animated film, based on La Chicharra, set in the Chespirito Media Universe was expected to start production in 2020. It will be focusing on its character Vicente Chambón.

== Television series ==
=== Chespirito: Sin querer queriendo ===
On April 24, 2018, Roberto Gómez Fernández revealed that a biographical series based on his father, Roberto Gómez Bolaños, or Chespirito, is in development. The series will be based on Chespirito's autobiography Sin Querer Queriendo. On October 14, 2019, he revealed that series will serve as the first installment on the Chespirito Media Universe. On October 18, 2019, former recurrent Chespirito collaborator Édgar Vivar revealed that the series will focus on Chespirito's life when he was 43-years-old. He also said Chespirito's wife and former recurrent collaborator, Florinda Meza, will be involved in the project, though she later denied her involvement in the series. Vivar will provide information on Chespirito's life for the series, Former recurrent Chespirito collaborator María Antonieta de las Nieves will also work on the series. Gómez Fernández and Tania Benítez will produce the series. Gómez Fernández will also direct the series. The series was announced under the working title Chespirito: Sin Querer Queriendo in May 2023. Max Latin America will distribute the series. Filming was expected to begin in 2020, though it was later delayed to 2021 due to the COVID-19 pandemic, and was later delayed once again. Casting has begun by March 2022, in Miami, Florida, United States. In April 2025, the biological series is officially scheduled to June 5, 2025.

=== Untitled animated El Chavo series (TBA) ===
On October 14, 2019, Roberto Gómez Fernández revealed that an animated series based on El Chavo, taking place in the collaboration between the Chespirito Media Universe and Warner Bros. Discovery, is in development. It will be the second animated series based on El Chavo, after the 2006 series El Chavo Animado.

First presented in Los Angeles, then at MIPCOM in Cannes, a new CG-animated series adaptation of El Chavo del Ocho is in development. It will be produced by THR3 Media Group. It will feature the return of La Chilindrina, a character absent in the previous animated series.

== See also ==
- Chespirito
- Chespirito (TV series)
- El Chavo del Ocho
- El Chavo Animado
- El Chapulín Colorado
- El Chapulín Colorado (2015 TV series)
- Los Caquitos
