= El Chanfle 2 =

- Directed by: Roberto Gómez Bolaños "Chespirito"
- Written by: Roberto Gómez Bolaños "Chespirito"
- Produced by: Roberto Gómez Bolaños "Chespirito"
- Starring: Roberto Gómez Bolaños "Chespirito"; Florinda Meza; Rubén Aguirre; Edgar Vivar; María Antonieta de las Nieves; Angelines Fernández; Raúl 'Chato' Padilla; Sergio Ramos; Benito Raúl Ibarra; Horacio Gómez Bolaños; César Sobrevals
- Cinematography: José Ortiz Ramos
- Edited by: Carlos Savage
- Music by: Leonardo Velázquez
- Production company: Televisa
- Release date: January 14, 1982 (Mexico)
- Running time: 92 minutes
- Country: Mexico
- Language: Spanish

El Chanfle 2, also known as El Chanfle II or El Chanfle Segundo, is a 1982 Mexican comedy film, produced, written, directed and starring Roberto Gómez Bolaños. It is the sequel to his previous film El Chanfle, starring the regular cast of Chespirito, with some absences, such as Carlos Villagrán, who previously decided not to work with Gómez Bolaños for personal reasons, leaving his two TV shows in 1979, El Chavo del Ocho and El Chapulín Colorado. Also absent from the film is Ramón Valdés who was managing health problems at the time. The plot revolves around a humble prop player from a football team who accidentally gets entangled in a diamond smuggling operation. The film was released on January 14, 1982.

== Plot ==
At the end of the first film, Chanfle is named coach of the children's forces of Club America. At the beginning of the second film, El Chanfle is seen performing this activity. As the eighth symposium of the club was approaching Sr. Matute has the honor of telling the news to all his staff, the Chanfle is so excited about the idea that Sr. Matute tells him that Tere, El Chanfle's wife, and Theresa, her baby, can also go at no cost. Sr. Matute, president of the club already had a new secretary: the cashier from Viana, who was recommended by El Chanfle, since Diana left the job for an extremely embarrassing and engaging issue that prevented her from remaining in the job: She stole money from the club for a need. Despite this, it was with a man who had the reputation of lending and having a lot of money to lend him the money he owed. But the man to whom Diana asked for the money, had not made his fortune in an honest way, as he was a smuggler. When Diana tells the "boss" that she can't pay him what he owes her, he says yes. All he had to do was "work".

The new secretary, had a husband named Paco or «Chato», who was very disappointed to see that his wife would have to go to the club simpósium and not. So she and Paco had to sacrifice a "little money" that he had saved to repair the house and instead, paid the passage of the «Chato» to Taxco and all its expenses. Upon arriving at Taxco, Diana had to perform the "job" that was entrusted to her, but this was very compromising and dangerous: She had to deliver to a contraband contact a soccer ball, inside which were jewelry worth one million dollars. When they agreed to do this Sr. Cejudo, coach who would hire America again, would go to Taxco to the club's symposium. Before boarding the plane, at the airport of Buenos Aires, another contact handed him the ball with the jewels inside, so that already in the hotel, Diana took it off and delivered it to the contact who said: "The fifteen". As Diana did not know the contact, on the phone, he told her that to recognize him, he would wear a white hat with black feathers and see him in the pool of the Taxco hotel.

Coincidentally, this contact in the pool stumbled upon El Chanfle, who was wearing another white but featherless hat that Tere gave him. For this, El Chanfle accidentally puts on the other's hat and Diana sees him and tells him a key, but the Chanfle does not understand the meaning of what it means, besides that Diana brought the ball hidden under the dress, so she looked pregnant and not "the notorious bundle", which was the sign he gave for her to be recognized.

Meanwhile, Tere brought a very notorious bundle, which were the dirty diapers of Theresa, his daughter, and the contact identified the bundle, and took it, in return, to Tere gave him $25,000, which was the profit agreed between the boss and Diana.

Both Diana and "El quince" had erred enormously, as by missignals both had been exposed to being caught "in the act". (Diana for showing El Chanfle that for something he was saying inconsistencies as the key: "I have a doll dressed in blue" (they had to answer "I am the wild flower that withered oblivion"), and "El quince" for showing Tere that he wanted to force a supposed "ball")

Overall, everything became more confused, until the supposed " ball" was put in a stroller for baby, El Chanfle took it by mistake believing that that was his baby's cart, and after a discussion of whose son Sr. Cejudo took it off, believing that El Chanfle had stolen it. " El quince" took a stroller, believing that the ball was there, but confused the stroller, which he learned when he saw that instead of the ball was the baby of El Chanfle.

He returns it, and when he sees Cejudo with the ball, he forcibly removes it. Already when he was going to take him in his car, Diana collided with "El quince", when both of them realized that they had confused each other. But as "El quince" collided with Diana, she slapped him, so he dropped the ball letting it fall, he rolled the ball down, since the parking lot was in decline, and reached the hands of «Chato», who for being drunk, He thought it was a baby and took it as his son.

Diana totally regretted what happened and went to look for Sr. Matute, who reported it to the police commander. They called an emergency meeting, to which El Chanfle refused to go and his wife Tere instead. Sr. Cejudo of passing jewelry inside a soccer ball. But Diana really still believed that the Chanfle was a contact, when in fact she got confused. It turned out that Sr. Secudo had also identified the one who stole the ball, the same one who "bought" Tere's dirty diapers. Almost instantly, the police commander phoned, offering $10,000 in reward to whoever handed over the football. Hope was almost lost, until the secretary asked if it wasn't a ball full of signatures, upon receiving the affirmative answer, she said, "My husband has it!"

Then, all without exception run to find him, everyone finds him and passes from one to another, until El Chanfle decided that the ball would be his, then «Chato» put the ball in the baby cart and the Chanfle went for him, but as the slope of the parking lot was declining, the whole field that was going down in the cart went mouth and nobody reached it nor wanted to reach it, since Tere had lost his flip flops, (one kicking her to reach the ball, hitting Dr. Nájera in the face and the other kicking and punching the head of the smugglers in the face, who fell into a fountain).

At the end of the whole descent route, in the park there goes Dr. Chapatín looking and running, El Chanfle came to the town, where finally the stroller fell, with him, who was very injured. Afterwards, Dr. Nájera cured him, but since the reward had been given to Tere and Chanfle, Tere paid for the cure. The doctor then told him that the team members should not pay, so he returned the money to Tere, who carelessly dropped the Chanfle in his wheelchair down the stairs.

== Cast ==
- Roberto Gómez Bolaños «Chespirito» as Chanfle and Dr. Chapatin
- Florinda Meza as Tere
- Rubén Aguirre as Mr. Matute
- Raúl «Chato» Padilla as Paco
- Edgar Vivar as Dr. Nájera
- María Antonieta de las Nieves as Diana
- Angelines Fernández as Paco's wife
- Sergio Ramos as Secudo
- Benito Raúl Ibarra as Henchman
- Horacio Gómez Bolaños as Gangster
- César Sobrevals as Argentinian customs clerk
