= Los Supergenios de la Mesa Cuadrada =

- Also known as: Chespirito
- Genre: Sitcom
- Created by: Roberto Gómez Bolaños
- Written by: Roberto Gómez Bolaños
- Directed by: Enrique Segoviano; Roberto Gómez Bolaños
- Starring: Roberto Gómez Bolaños; María Antonieta de las Nieves; Ramón Valdés; Rubén Aguirre; Carlos Villagran; Florinda Meza; Édgar Vivar; Angelines Fernández
- Opening theme: "A Blessed Event" by Riz Ortolani
- Country of origin: Mexico
- Original language: Spanish
- No. of seasons: 6
- No. of episodes: 290 (list of episodes)

Production
- Camera setup: Thomson TTV-1530; General Electric PE350
- Running time: 21–26 minutes

Original release
- Release: 15 October 1970 – 20 February 1973

Related
- Chespirito

Los Supergenios De La Mesa Cuadrada (often shortened to Chespirito) is a Mexican television sitcom, popular in Latin America, Spain, and the United States, among other countries.

Chespirito first appeared in 1968 was produced by Televisión Independiente de México (TIM).
