= Chespirito (TV series) =

Mexican comedy show

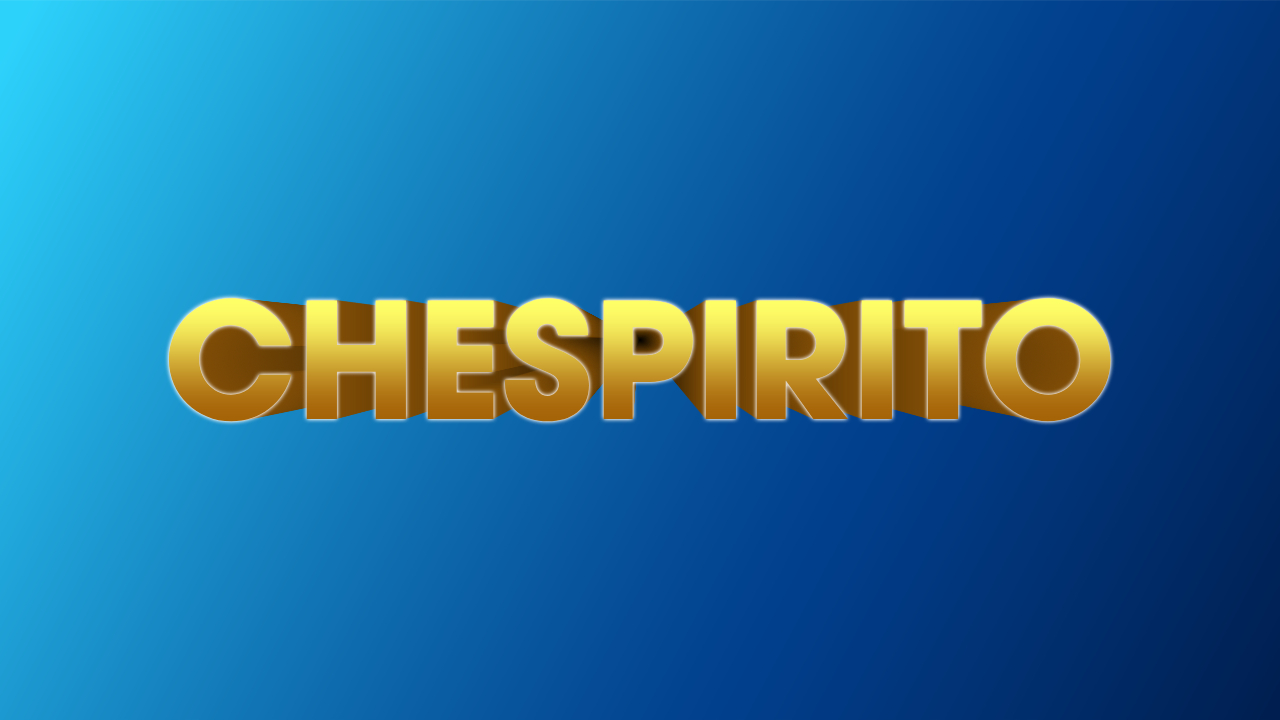
- Also known as: Los Supergenios de la Mesa Cuadrada (1970–1971); Chespirito y la Mesa Cuadrada (1971)
- Created by: Roberto Gómez Bolaños
- Directed by: Sergio Peña, Alberto del Bosque, Eduardo Alatorre and Enrique Segoviano (1970–1973) / Roberto Gómez Bolaños and Roberto Gómez Fernández (1980–1995)
- Starring: Roberto Gómez Bolaños (1970–1973; 1980–1995); María Antonieta de las Nieves (1970–1973; 1980–1994); Florinda Meza (1970–1973; 1980–1990; 1991–1995); Carlos Villagrán (1970–1973); Ramón Valdés (1970–1973; 1981–1982); Rubén Aguirre (1970–1973; 1980–1995); Angelines Fernández (1970–1973; 1980–1991); Édgar Vivar (1970–1973; 1980–1990; 1992–1995); Horacio Gómez Bolaños (1980–1995); Raúl "Chato" Padilla (1980; 1982–1994); Benny Ibarra (1980–1982); Roberto Gómez Fernández (1984–1985; 1987–1988); Carlos Pouliot (1987–1992); Anabel Gutiérrez (1987–1989; 1991–1995); Moisés Suárez (1980–1985; 1990; 1992–1995); Paulina Gómez (1992–1995); Arnoldo Picazzo (1994–1995)
- Opening theme: "The Elephant Never Forgets", by Jean-Jacques Perrey (1980–1981); "El Chapulín Colorado", by Víctor Arcos (1981–1993); El Chapulín Colorado", by Rodolfo 'Popo' Sánchez (1993–1995)
- Country of origin: Mexico
- Original language: Spanish
- No. of seasons: 16
- No. of episodes: 693 approximately

Production
- Camera setup: Multi-camera
- Running time: 30 minutes (1969–1970; 1992–1993; 1993–1994); 45 minutes (1969); 60 minutes (1970–1972; 1979–1992 1993)
- Production companies: Televisión Independiente de México (1970–1973); Televisa (1980–1995)

Original release
- Network: Canal 8
- Release: 15 October 1970 – 20 February 1973
- Network: El Canal de las Estrellas
- Release: 28 January 1980 – 25 September 1995

Chespirito is a Mexican sketch comedy series created by and starring comedian and actor Roberto Gomez Bolaños, whose nickname gave the show its title.

Two series were produced with the same title. The first premiered as Los Supergenios de la Mesa Cuadrada on Televisión Independiente de México on October 15, 1970, after a two-year span of this sketch being part of the Sábados de la Fortuna/Sábados con Neftalí/Carrousel con Neftalí show (hosted by Neftalí López Páez), aired in the same channel, since October 1968, during the 1968 Summer Olympics in Mexico City; the independent series adopted the Chespirito y La Mesa Cuadrada and later the Chespirito title in 1971, and aired until February 20, 1973. The second series, which aired on the TIM's successor, Televisa, premiered on January 28, 1980 and aired until September 25, 1995.

Alongside Roberto Gómez Bolaños, other famous Mexican and international actors starred in the sketches. In the two periods, characters like El Chavo del Ocho, El Chapulín Colorado, Los Caquitos, Dr. Chapatín, Los Chifladitos, El Ciudadano Gómez, La Chicharra, Chespirito, Los Chiripiojos and the parodies of Chaplin and Laurel and Hardy starred in sketches 2–15 minutes long. The 1980–1995 period also featured special 40-minute episodes, even consisting of two or three 40-minute long parts.

The show's first seasons featured a canned laugh track, but Gómez Bolaños made the then-controversial decision to drop it in 1982, after the departure of Ramón Valdés. From 1982 to 1985, most presentations of the show include the announcer's warning that, out of respect for the audience's intelligence, there was no laugh track.

== History ==
=== First period (1968–1970; Block of Los sábados de la fortuna; 1970–1973; Standalone) ===
In 1968, Roberto Gómez Bolaños created and starred in a segment named Los Supergenios de la Mesa Cuadrada, in the show Sábados de la Fortuna of Televisión Independiente de México's XHTM-TV channel 8. The segment eventually became a separate show of its own due to its success. In this show, Chespirito read "letters" sent by the show's audience, most of which made fun of current events. Alongside him, Ramón Valdés, Rubén Aguirre, Aníbal de Mar (who left the cast after a short time), and Barbara Ramson (who was later replaced by María Antonieta de las Nieves) also starred in the show, not only about the "letters", but also playing characters in other sketches eventually created by Gómez Bolaños. Los Supergenios was presented by Dr. Chespirito Chapatín (Bolaños), El Ingeniebrio Ramón Valdés Tirado Alanis (Valdés), El Profesor Rubén Aguirre Jirafales (Aguirre), Anibal and a “secretary” first played by Barbara Ramson and later replaced by La Mococha Pechocha, or, La Marioneta (played by María Antonieta de las Nieves, who also went on to read the letters upon Anibal de Mar's departure) at a square table where they read the letters and comment about them. Sometimes the letters were answered by sketches. In one sketch, a viewer of the show asked what to do when a crazed person put a giant rock in the door of his house, then a sketch starring María Antonieta de las Nieves, Rubén Aguirre and Ramón Valdes showed the solution to his problem.

In 1970, Carlos Villagrán and Florinda Meza were added to the show's cast, playing secondary characters. In the same year, Gómez Bolaños decided to end the run of the ‘supergenios’ sketch and rename the show as Chespirito, and created the successful sketches of El Chapulín Colorado and Los Caquitos to replace it. From then on the sketches featured in the show were El Chapulín Colorado, Dr. Chapatín, Los Caquitos, Chespirito and Los Chifladitos.

In 1972, Rubén Aguirre left the cast of Chespirito to host another show El Club de Shory in a rival network; El Shory was a nickname of Rubén Aguirre. Roberto Gómez Bolaños then created his most successful character, El Chavo del Ocho, to fill in the void left by the sketch Los Chifladitos, starring Gómez Bolaños and Aguirre, that had to be eliminated when Aguirre left the cast.

By 1972, the show was almost entirely made of El Chavo del Ocho and El Chapulín Colorado. Then, Gómez Bolaños decided to end the Chespirito show to star in the half-hour weekly series of El Chavo del Ocho, El Chapulín Colorado, and also a short lived series called El Ciudadano Gómez, a parody of Citizen Kane. Aguirre returned to the show in the last episodes of Chespirito. That same year, Televisión Independiente de México was acquired by rival network Telesistema Mexicano, and the new company resulting from the merger was renamed as Televisa. Then Gómez Bolaños' shows were all transferred to Televisa's channel 2 and El Chavo del Ocho was renamed simply as El Chavo (though the original name was still constantly repeated by the characters in every episode of the series).

=== Second period (1980–1995) ===
After the end of the half-hour series of El Chavo and El Chapulín Colorado in 1979, as well as the flop of La Chicharra, Gómez Bolaños decided to return the successful sketch comedy format of Los Supergenios in 1980 with the second version of the Chespirito show. The show featured the famous characters of Chespirito in a 60-minute show, El Chavo del Ocho, El Chapulín Colorado, Los Caquitos, Los Chifladitos, La Chicharra, and the late introduction of Don Calavera in 1994, alongside the remake of El Ciudadano Gómez. The parodies of Chaplin and Laurel and Hardy were also introduced in 1980.

Ramón Valdés temporarily returned to the show in 1981, playing only Don Ramón in El Chavo del Ocho and Súper Sam and the villains in El Chapulín Colorado. He also acted in other sketches with secondary characters (with the exception of La Chicharra and Laurel and Hardy). Valdés permanently left the show in late 1981 for unknown reasons (rumored to be for disliking Gómez Bolaños relinquishing directive control to Florinda Meza) and went on to star in a couple of shows along with Carlos Villagrán. In 1981, Benny Ibarra starred in some sketches as a secondary character.

In 1982, Benny Ibarra returned playing a secondary character in the sketch "Los Piratas" of El Chapulín Colorado and "Sr. Hurtado" in El Chavo del Ocho. Raúl "Chato" Padilla returned to the show after to substitute for Valdés. The character "Jaimito, el cartero", of El Chavo del Ocho, started living in the vecindad. His character got all the characteristics of Don Ramón, a change which was heavily criticized by fans.

In 1984, Roberto Gómez Fernández, Gómez Bolaños' son, became another member of the cast.

In 1986, Roberto Gómez Fernández and his uncle, Horacio Gómez Bolaños, Chespirito's brother, became directors of the show. Horacio now starred only as Godínez in El Chavo del Ocho, as well as secondary characters in other sketches.

In 1987, various guest actors played secondary characters in sketches of the show. Also, El Chavo del Ocho and El Chapulín Colorado became slightly less important to the show. The same happened to the other characters, and with Gómez Bolaños giving attention to the sketch Los Caquitos, the sketch virtually became a half-hour series inside the show.

On August 9, 1988, Ramón Valdés died of stomach cancer, after a long agony in the hospital. Roberto Gómez Bolaños was the only friend of Valdés who didn't attend the funeral. Carlos Villagrán, Édgar Vivar, Rubén Aguirre and Angelines Fernández were some of his friends from El Chavo del Ocho who attended the funeral. María Antonieta de las Nieves became very worried of not knowing of his condition in his last moments of life, and sad not to have been able to attend his funeral, due to her being on tour in Peru at the time of his death (Peru was also where she had last seen him a year before).

In 1991, Florinda Meza temporarily left the show to star the telenovela Milagro y magia. After the end of the telenovela, she returned to the cast of the show. Angelines Fernández permanently left the show at the end of the same year due to her lung cancer.

In 1992, Gómez Bolaños ended the sketches of El Chavo del Ocho, since he was too old to play the role of an 8-year-old boy. Also, Édgar Vivar left the show temporarily because of his obesity.

In 1993, the sketch of El Chapulín Colorado also ended.

In 1994, the sketch El Ciudadano Gómez, parody of Citizen Kane returned to Dr. Chapatín, Los Caquitos and Los Chifladitos in the show. Raúl "Chato" Padilla left the show, dying on February 3 of that year. On March 25, Angelines Fernández also died of lung cancer; Angelines was an acknowledged tobacco smoker.

In September 1995, Televisa decided to eliminate all comedy and sitcom shows airing on weeknights at 8 o’clock and use that timeslot for more telenovelas (Mexican soap operas), while offering to transfer only the Chespirito comedy show and Silvia Pinal's TV show to a timeslot on weekends. Because of this, Gómez Bolaños preferred to end the 15-year-old Chespirito show.

== After the show ==
Roberto Gómez Bolaños and Florinda Meza continued for some years the theater play 11 y 12 (also created and produced by Gómez Bolaños), which became very successful in Mexico and Latin America.

In 1997, the show was dubbed in Portuguese, especially to Brazil, renamed Clube do Chaves.

On November 21, 1999, Horacio Gómez Bolaños (younger brother of Chespirito) died of a heart attack.

On November 19, 2004, Roberto Gómez Bolaños married Florinda Meza after dating for a long time.

In 2006, an animated series featuring the characters of El Chavo premiered. It ran for several seasons until 2014.

In 2007, the channel Clásico TV reran "Chespirito" episodes dating from 1980 to 1995. The series finale was broadcast in July 2012. In October 2012, the channel was renamed Distrito Comedia. The series was transmitted on the weekends (2007–2012) and Monday to Friday (2012–2018).

In 2008, the channel Clásico TV returned with Los Supergenios de la Mesa Cuadrada, the first period of the Chespirito show, which was transmitted on Wednesdays. The series finale was broadcast in 2009.

On November 28, 2014, Roberto Gómez Bolaños died at the age of 85.

In 2015, an animated series featuring El Chapulín Colorado premiered. It ran for several seasons until 2017.

== Seasons ==
=== Second period ===
Season	Episodes	Originally released	
Season	Episodes	First released	Last released
1	45	February 4, 1980	December 29, 1980
2	44	January 5, 1981	January 2, 1982
3	41	February 22, 1982	December 13, 1982
4	34	January 3, 1983	January 9, 1984
5	40	January 23, 1984	January 14, 1985
6	38	January 21, 1985	December 30, 1985
7	39	January 6, 1986	December 29, 1986
8	47	January 5, 1987	December 28, 1987
9	37	January 4, 1988	December 27, 1988
10	40	January 2, 1989	December 25, 1989
11	28	January 1, 1990	December 17, 1990
12	38	January 7, 1991	December 30, 1991
13	39	January 6, 1992	December 27, 1992
14	43	January 4, 1993	December 27, 1993
15	40	January 3, 1994	January 2, 1995
16	30	January 9, 1995	September 25, 1995

== Sketches ==
- El Chavo del Ocho (1971–1973; 1980–1992)
- El Chapulín Colorado (1970–1973; 1980–1993)
- Dr. Chapatín (1972–1973; 1980–1992; 1993; 1994–1995)
- Los Caquitos (1970–1973; 1980–1995)
- La Chicharra (1980–1984)
- Chespirito (1970–1972; 1980–1992; 1994–1995)
- Los Supergenios de la Mesa Cuadrada (1970–1972)
- Los Chifladitos (1970–1972; 1980–1992; 1993; 1994–1995)
- Chaplin (1980–1983; 1991)
- Laurel and Hardy (1980–1982; 1984; 1988)
- Don Calavera (1993–1994)
- El Ciudadano Gómez, parody of Citizen Kane (1970; 1973; 1993–1994)
- Al Estilo del Cine Mudo (1993–1995)
- Mini Teatro (1993–1995)
- Increible Pero Ciento Por Ciento (1993–1995)
- La Noticia Rebelde (1993–1995)
- Con Humor al estilo... Chespirito (1993–1994)
- La Noticia Rebelde (1993–1994)

== Cast ==
The cast of the show in both periods.

Period	Cast
First period (1968–1973)	Roberto Gómez Bolaños – Dr. Chapatín, El Chavo del Ocho, Chaparrón Bonaparte, Chómpiras, El Chapulín Colorado, Ciudadano Gómez, Chespirito; Ramón Valdés – El Ingeniebrio Don Ramón Valdés Tirado Alanis, Don Ramón, El Peterete; María Antonieta de las Nieves – La Mococha Pechocha (La Marioneta), La Chilindrina, Dr. Chapatín's nurse, various enemies of El Chapulín Colorado; Rubén Aguirre (1970–1972) – Professor Rubén Aguirre Jirafales, Lucas Tañeda, various enemies of El Chapulín Colorado; Anabel Gutiérrez (1970–1973) – Secondary characters; Florinda Meza (1971–1973) – Doña Florinda, secondary characters of other sketches; Carlos Villagrán (1970–1973) – Quico, Sargento Refugio, secondary characters of other sketches; Édgar Vivar (1971–1973) – Señor Barriga, El Botija; Angelines Fernández (1971–1973) – Doña Cleotilde; José Antonio Mena (1971–1973) – Secondary characters
Second period (1980–1995)	Roberto Gómez Bolaños – El Chavo, Chómpiras, Chespirito, Dr. Chapatín, Vicente Chambón, Chaparrón Bonaparte, El Chapulín Colorado, Stan Laurel, Chaplin, Don Calavera; María Antonieta de las Nieves – La Chilindrina, Marujita, Genoveva, various enemies of El Chapulín Colorado, Various secondary characters; Rubén Aguirre – Profesor Jirafales, Sargento Refugio (1982–1984; 1986–1995), Lucas Tañeda, Don Lino Tapia, Doctor, various enemies of El Chapulín Colorado; Florinda Meza (1980–1990; 1992–1995) – Doña Florinda, La Popis, La Chimoltrufia, Cándida, Dr. Chapatín's nurse, Neighbor, various enemies of El Chapulín Colorado; Édgar Vivar (1980–1992; 1992–1995) – Señor Barriga, Ñoño, El Botija, Oliver Hardy, Doña Ramona, various enemies of El Chapulín Colorado; Raúl «Chato» Padilla (1980; 1982–1994) – Jaimito el cartero, Police Officer (1982–1994), Licenciado Morales, various secondary characters; Horacio Gómez Bolaños – Godínez, Don Horacio, Sargento Refugio (1980–1982), El Licenciado (1980–1981), various secondary characters; Angelines Fernández (1980–1994) – Doña Cleotilde, Úrsula, Doña Nachita, various secondary characters; Ramón Valdés (1981–1982) – Don Ramón, Super Sam, El Tripaseca, El Rascabuches, El Licenciado (1981–1982), Police Officer (1981–1982).; Benny Ibarra (1981–1982) – Señor Hurtado; Arturo García Tenorio (1980–1994) – Various secondary characters; Roberto Gómez Fernández (1982–1986) – Sargento Refugio (1984–1985), various secondary characters; Ramiro Orci (1982–1993) – Secondary characters; Heriberto López de Anda (1987–1994) – Various secondary characters; Anabel Gutiérrez (1987–1990; 1991–1995) – Doña Espotaverderona; Carlos Pouliot (1987–1992) – Don Lucho; Moisés Suárez (1990; 1992–1995) – Don Cecilio Buenavista; Paulina Gómez (1992–1995) – Various secondary characters; Ricardo de Pascual (1993–1995) – Various secondary characters; Arnoldo Picazzo (1993–1995) – Various secondary characters

== See also ==
- El Chapulín Colorado
- El Chavo del Ocho
- Sketch comedy
