= Juan y la Borrega =

Juan y la Borrega "John and the Ram"
- Directed by: J. Xavier Velasco
- Written by: J. Xavier Velasco
- Produced by: San Juan Edgar
- Starring: Manuel Domínguez; Carlos Aragón; Edgar Vivar
- Cinematography: Felipe Perez-Burchard
- Edited by: J. Xavier Velasco
- Music by: Alejandro Bonilla
- Production company: Consejo Nacional para la Cultura y las Artes (CONACULTA)
- Distributed by: Instituto Mexicano de Cinematografía (IMCINE)
- Release date: March 28, 2011 (Guadalajara International Film Festival)
- Running time: 11 minutes
- Country: Mexico
- Language: Spanish

Juan y la Borrega (or Juan and la Borrega) is a 2011 Mexican short drama/thriller by Mexican director J. Xavier Velasco.

== Background ==
Inspired by his observations of public criticism of violence in real life situations, director J. Xavier Velasco took about a year to complete this project. The film debuted at the Guadalajara International Film Festival in March 2010, and had its world premiere at Cannes Film Festival Court Métrage in 2011.

== Plot ==
Juan (Manuel Domínguez) is an employee of a uniform store was comfortable in his routine, uninspired, and mundane life until he meets "La Borrega" (The Lamb) (Carlos Aragón), a cruel man who tortures Juan.

== Cast ==
- Edgar Vivar as Enrique
- Manuel Domínguez as Juan
- Carlos Aragón as La Borrega
