= Los Caquitos =

- Also known as: Chompiras
- Genre: Comedy; Slapstick
- Created by: Roberto Gómez Bolaños
- Written by: Roberto Gómez Bolaños
- Directed by: Roberto Gómez Bolaños; Roberto Gómez Fernández; Horacio Gómez Bolaños
- Starring: Roberto Gómez Bolaños; Édgar Vivar; Florinda Meza
- Country of origin: Mexico
- Original language: Spanish
- No. of seasons: 1 (as a Los supergenios de la mesa cuadrada sketch); 15 (as a Chespirito sketch)

Production
- Executive producer: Horacio Gomez Bolaños
- Producer: Carmen Ochoa de Garcia (1980-85)

Original release
- Network: Televisa

Related
- Chespirito

Los Caquitos (English: "The Little Thieves") is a sketch comedy of the Chespirito television comedy program that ran from 1980 to 1995. It was created by Roberto Gómez Bolaños, who also played one of the title characters, "El Chómpiras".

== History ==
=== Origins ===
Originally, Chómpiras was a pickpocket and cat burglar who worked with an associate named Peterete (Ramón Valdés). Their skills in thievery were marginal, but Peterete was ostensibly the more intelligent and skilled of the pair. Together, they were known as Los Caquitos (which is roughly translated as "The Little Thieves", "caquito" being a diminutive of "caco" which is Spanish for "thief" or "hoodlum") and appeared on Chespirito's comedy programs in the 1970s, usually preceding an episode of El Chavo del Ocho or El Chapulín Colorado that did not last the full half-hour. By 1973, El Chavo episodes were all a half-hour long and did not need the filler sketches, and shorter Chapulín episodes ceased to use Caquitos sketches, so the characters virtually disappeared.

=== Debut on Chespirito ===
In 1980, a new show premiered called Chespirito, which was an-hour-long and employed all of Chespirito's characters in sketches of varying lengths. On Chespirito, El Chómpiras and Los Caquitos were revived. However, Ramón Valdés had left Chespirito's troupe in 1979, so Peterete was forgotten and replaced with Botija (Édgar Vivar). Since most of the Caquitos sketches performed on the new show were simply remakes of the ones that had appeared years before on the older ones, Botija's character was extremely similar to Peterete's, except physically, since Botija was extremely fat, and Peterete was extremely thin.

=== Development ===
The characters weren't very fleshed out (no pun intended) originally, but as Chespirito began writing new sketches for the hour-long show, some of which lasted the entire hour, their backstories became more expanded. Botija was single at first, but got married very quickly to a woman called Chimoltrufia (Florinda Meza) who had moplike hair, a chipped tooth and constantly chewed a piece of gum. She was soon established as the conscience of the sketches; often she would earn money doing a respectable job, usually cleaning or babysitting. Many episodes didn't have to do with Chómpiras's and Botija's incompetent burgling, but instead focused on life in Chimoltrufia and Botija's tiny apartment. A neighbor named Doña Nachita (Angelines Fernández) started appearing frequently and eventually became a regular. Policemen were a regular feature in Caquitos sketches, but by the mid-1980s, Rubén Aguirre became the sketch's definitive policeman, the dimwitted Sgt. Refugio. Around this time, there were many sketches that took place at the police station as the characters tried to argue their innocence after being arrested; presiding over these cases was the police chief played by Raúl Padilla, who was eventually named Licenciado Morales.

By the late 1980s, Chespirito started shifting away from Chavo and Chapulín sketches, as Chespirito and the others were getting older and less believable in those roles. The focus went to Los Caquitos, prompting a major change. Inspired by an episode of El Chavo, where a man named Señor Hurtado spends the day stealing the belongings of the residents of the neighborhood but after listening to Chavo (who had temporarily left the neighborhood after being briefly accused of the thefts and visited a church to confess) talking to his friends about his faith that the thief would turn good, he regrets his actions and returns everything he stole, Botija and Chómpiras vow to never steal again and get honest jobs. They and Chimoltrufia eventually settle into jobs at the inexpensive Hotel Lucho, run by Don Lucho (Carlos Pouliot). Chimoltrufia was a chambermaid and always did her job to the best of her ability, but Botija and Chómpiras tried to get by doing as little work as possible.

=== Final years ===
As the years passed, Chimoltrufia became more and more prominent until she was as much of the focus of the sketch as Chómpiras, possibly more. (To call it a "sketch" is not really fair at this point; by 1992, almost all Chespirito episodes were hour-long Chómpiras "sketches".) A few changes came at that time. First, Angelines Fernández stopped appearing (presumably due to her declining health and subsequent death in 1994 from lung cancer) and was gradually replaced by Chimoltrufia's mother Espotaverderona (Anabel Gutiérrez), who looked like a plump, middle-aged version of Chimoltrufia. Also, one hotel guest began appearing regularly, her name was Maruja (María Antonieta de las Nieves) and she attracted the attention of a lot of men, especially Sgt. Refugio. Then, Don Lucho closed his hotel, and the trio had to look for other jobs. For several episodes they tried other lines of work, but in 1993 a new hotel opened, run by Don Cecilio (Moisés Suárez) and they got their old jobs back. Cecilio's hotel, Hotel Buenavista, was nicer than Don Lucho's, but the routine was just the same and some of the storylines from the early Lucho episodes were recycled. In 1994 and 1995, Chespirito started returning to its old format of presenting several different sketches during the show, but most featured a long Chómpiras sketch. In 1995, Chespirito decided to bring the whole thing to a close and stopped producing episodes.

For a short time, Édgar Vivar left the show due to health problems stemming from his weight. To explain Vivar's absence, it was written into the show that Botija was away at a weight-loss clinic, which was also the actor's real-life health situation. Vivar would return some time later, having lost a noticeable amount of weight.

== Characters ==
=== Regular characters ===
- El Chómpiras (1970-1995) (Roberto Gómez Bolaños) is the title character. Previously he was an "amateur" thief as he recalls, along with Peterete and later Botija. Both he and el Botija stopped being thieves after viewing an episode of El Chavo del Ocho where Chavo unknowngly reedems a thief who was stealing everything in the neighborhood. The episode so touched their conscience that they gave up their criminal lives to become honorable men. Chómpiras' full name is Aquíles Esquivel Madrazo, and was only mentioned once in passing. While more dim-witted than Botija, Chompiras proved himself to be somewhat more responsible than him, as he constantly works during their days off, while the lazy Botija only rests during those days. Additionally, Chompiras is implied to be somewhat worried about his economic status, evidently due to the low salary he gets from his work, due to him always working only if somebody gives him a tip, working during his days off, and even doing another job while working at the Hotel Lucho/Buenavista, the latter which irritates the hotel's administrator. In interviews, Bolaños said that out of all of his characters, he enjoyed playing el Chómpiras the most.
- El Peterete (1970-1978) (Ramón Valdés): El Chómpiras' original partner in crime. After Vivar's Botija character took his place, no mention was made of what happened to El Peterete. It is believed that this was due to Valdés no longer being involved with the Chespirito program, whether due to failing health or his decision to appear on Ah, Qué Kiko! with Carlos Villagrán. However, Chompiras' bio in the Chespirito website states that El Peterete left Chompiras for the latter's stupidity, and went to another city.
- Gordon Botija (also known as El Botija) (1979-1995) (Édgar Vivar) is the second regular from 1979 to 1995. He is "large", and was also a thief along with Chómpiras. According to Chompiras' bio in the Chespirito website, Botija met Chompiras shortly after the latter was abandoned by El Peterete. Botija married Chimoltrufia, and later worked in the Hotel Buenavista. Over the length of Vivar's tenure as Botija, the character's last name has changed. In one of the earliest sketches, he claimed that his first name was "Boti" and his last name was "Ja". In other sketches, he claims his full name is "Gordon Botija y Aguado", and in others, "Gordon Botija Pompa y Pompa", both names being puns on Vivar's rotund figure. In Botija's bio in the Chespirito website, it was explained that his full name is "Gordon Botija Aguado Pompa y Pompa". The character also claims that his father was English, and that he was also a fan of Flash Gordon, hence his first name of "Gordon". In spite of constantly mistreating Chompiras, he admitted to love him like a brother when he assumed him to be in critical condition in "El Chompiras es mordido por Dracula" (1994). Following Vivar's gastric bypass surgery, he retired the character of Botija.
- La Chimoltrufia (1980-1995) (Florinda Meza), born María Expropiación Petronila Lascuráin y Torquemada de Botija, is the wife of Botija. She has broom-like hair and works as a hotel maid. She has an extremely roundabout manner of expressing herself, a strong sense of justice, and a singing voice that could curdle milk. She is also quick to resort to physical violence against others who she thinks are doing her wrong. In some episodes, it is shown that she believes movies on TV are real, with her assuming Chompiras to be one of the main creatures of a movie (such as a vampire, an alien, etc.) In spite of being simple-minded and naive, Chimoltrufia often showed an occasional cleverness, most notably in "Las Piezas de Pan" (1993), where she managed to escape from mobster El Cuajinais' lair by tricking a drunk doctor into freeing her and later injecting the doctor with an anesthetic he was going to use on her. According to her, she was named "María Expropiación Petronila" because she was born the day of the Mexican oil expropriation (in Spanish, "Dia de la expropiacion petrolera"), so she was given that name in honor of the event. Chimoltrufia is shown to be very sensible about her age, constantly refusing to reveal in what year she was born. However, it is implied in La Llegada de Maruja - Parte 2 that she is at least 32-years-old, as she commented to Doña Nachita that she left school 12 years before the events of the episode, to which Doña Nachita, recalling that she was in school until 3rd grade of primary school, asks if she was in primary school until she was in her 20s.
- Sargento Refugio Pasguato (1970-1995)(Ruben Aguirre/Horacio Gómez/Carlos Villagrán): Dutiful but dumb, Sargento Refugio is one of the only police characters seen working in Licenciado Morales' office. Over the years, he has become friends with Botija, Chómpiras and La Chimoltrufia. Even so, his overzealousness causes them to end up in front of Licenciado Morales. Whenever he comes to a fairly obvious conclusion, he asks Morales "¿Merezco un acenso?" (Do I deserve a raise?). He also often goes along with Chimoltrufia's assumptions of TV movies being real. He previously was a police captain, but was demoted to a grade minor to sergeant after el Licenciado told him to "arrest everyone with a criminal face", to which he arrested Licenciado. However, he managed to be promoted back to sergeant after arresting a dangerous criminal known as "El Gorilla", who tried to kill him after being released.
- Licenciado Morales (1980-1994) (Raúl "Chato" "Padilla/Rubén Aguirre/Ramón Valdés): Sgt. Refugio's commanding officer. Also good friends with el Botija, el Chómpiras and la Chimoltrufia. At the end of almost every episode, all three of them will end up in his office, having been brought in by Sargento Refugio for some controversy.

=== Other characters ===
- Doña Espotaverderona (1989-1995) (Anabel Gutiérrez): La Chimoltrufia's mother. She has the same mannerisms as her daughter. She and Botija can't stand each other, especially because every time she stays in their apartment, he is relegated to the couch while she takes his bed. She also shares the same hot temper as her daughter; in one episode, Sargento Refugio attempts to help her cross the street—and is beaten quite soundly. mistaking his intentions.
- Don Cecilio (1993-1995) (Moisés Suárez): Owner of Hotel Buenavista, the hotel where Chómpiras, Botija and la Chimoltrufia work. Wears extremely thick glasses.
- Don Lucho (1987-1992) (Carlos Pouliot): The owner of Hotel Don Lucho, where Chómpiras, Botija and la Chimoltrufia originally worked. When Pouliot elected to leave the show, his absence was explained by saying that Hotel Don Lucho needed extensive repairment due to leaks, so the trio was forced to seek jobs elsewhere.
- Doña Nachita (1983-1993) (Angelines Fernández): La Chimoltrufia's next-door neighbor and the apartment building's gossip. She does not always get along with Botija, but is infatuated with Chómpiras. She believes in supernatural, with Nachita supporting and cementing Chimoltrufia's beliefs on supernatural.
- Marujita (1989-1994) (María Antonieta de las Nieves): Sgt. Refugio's girlfriend, and an occasional guest at Don Cecilio's hotel, where she occasionally tries to get out of paying the bill. Although she mentions that she travels a lot for her job, her occupation was never revealed during the show's run, although it was hinted that she worked as a prostitute (which both Chespirito and Rubén Aguirre later confirmed). She rarely gets along with Chimoltrufia, and is occasionally referred to disparagingly as la tal Maruja (that Maruja girl).
- Doña Ramona Pompa y Pompa (1991-1994) (Édgar Vivar): Botija's mother. She was presented as a somewhat snobbish woman. Both she and El Botija are allergic to the smell of gardenias, and have been known to pass out.

== Running gags ==
- The comb: If Chómpiras angered Botija (or Peterete), the latter would take out a comb and painstakingly straighten Chómpiras's hair before giving him a hard slap on the face that sent him spinning (and disarrayed his hair). Botija's slap is so powerful that after Chómpiras spins, he staggers so violently that Botija has to hold him still to stop him before he can give the warning. His slap was even painful to Botija's hand. However, this was never the case with Peterete, as his slap only made Chompiras spin a little bit with ease. Ironically, there had been rare occasions where Botija himself was punished by Chimoltrufia in the very same way Botija punishes Chompiras.
- The warning after the comb: After the classic comb slap, Peterete/Botija always warned Chómpiras (always starting with their catchphrase "y la próxima vez...": "And next time...") that the next time he screwed up or ticked them off again, providing a gruesome yet comical description on what they would do to him.
- Chimoltrufia's speech patterns: Chimoltrufia had a large number of nonsensical catchphrases, usually involving malapropisms, redundancies, or just plain weird speech. One of her best known catchphrases is "¿Pa' qué le digo que no si sí?" ("Why would I tell you that it doesn't if it does?")
- Chimoltrufia sings: While working or at home, Chimoltrufia starts to sing. However, she has a terrible singing voice. Whenever she's singing around someone else, said person tells her (at times through yelling) not to scream, only for Chimoltrufia, believing that she is a great singer, to say that she isn't screaming but singing, and either is told not to "sing" or keeps singing. Paradoxically, whenever Chimoltrufia is genuinely screaming, someone tells her to stop singing, to which she explains that she was actually screaming this time.
- The elevator: Working at the hotel, Botija usually read a book or slept inside the elevator he supposedly operated. When a customer wanted to use it, he told them to use the stairs. If they demanded an explanation, he replied that the elevator couldn't carry both his weight and the customer's. When the customer suggested that Botija step out and allow him to use the elevator, Botija refused, insisting that only he could operate the elevator. The result was that the customer almost always ended up using the stairs—and lodging a complaint with Don Lucho or Don Cecilio. After returning from his weight loss clinic, Botija says the elevator now supports only one other person besides himself. In one episode, the floor of the elevator gave way, and Botija was stuck, and in the episode "El cortocircuito" both Chompiras and Botija entered the partly-lifted elevator, causing it to fall and leaving half of it below the ground, proving Botija's claims to be true.
- The tip: When working as a bellhop, Chómpiras would ask if he was going to receive a tip before he even carried any luggage, which angered Don Cecilio or Don Lucho. Oftentimes, he would refuse to carry a customer's luggage if they refused to tip him, which angered the management even more.
- Insults: Any time Chómpiras was insulted by someone (usually Botija) calling him an idiot or animal he would reply "¿Que soy QUÉ?" (in English: "I'm WHAT?"), then the other character would repeat the insult in a louder voice, to which Chómpiras would take a completely relaxed attitude while saying "Ah, sí, sí" (in English: "Oh, yeah, yeah").
- The police station: Chómpiras, Botija and la Chimoltrufia would almost always end up in some sort of dispute that would involve Licenciado Morales (Raúl "Chato" Padilla). He would have to shout three times for them all to be quiet, and after the third time they would stop talking—all except for Chómpiras, who almost always would have the last word.
- Licenciado's nicknames: Throughout the series, a character (usually Chimoltrufia) ends up calling Licenciado an offensive nickname related to dogs, such as "Cara de Perro" (in English: "Dogface"), irritating Licenciado.
- The lady who runs the drugstore around the corner: Chómpiras' on-and-off lady friend. She occasionally allows him to sleep in the trastienda (back room) of the drugstore, but occasionally a wandering eye on Chómpiras' part gets him thrown out. Although she was an occasional plot point, she was never seen onscreen during the show's run.
- Sargento Refugio disguises himself: On a few occasions, there were criminal activities in the Hotel Lucho (or Hotel Buenavista) done covertly, forcing Sargento Refugio to infiltrate the hotel in order to prevent the crime by disguising himself with a fake moustache and a trenchcoat. However, his disguise is so poorly done that all the employees in the hotel recognize him instantly, much to the Sargento's annoyance.
- The laundry room's door: La Chimoltrufia often hits Don Cecilio on the head with the door when entering or leaving the laundry room, making him fall comically behind the counter.

== Spin-off web series ==
In 2016, Florinda Meza began releasing a series of web shorts starring La Chimoltrufia, with Meza reprising her role, on her YouTube channel. The series centers on Chimoltrufia as she answers a series of interviews while in her new work. During the earliest shorts, the fate of several characters from Los Caquitos were revealed, with Chompiras, Botija Doña Nachita, Licenciado Morales, and Sargento Refugio having passed away (reflecting how, aside from Botija actor Edgar Vivar, each of those characters' actors have passed away), while Chimoltrufia and Maruja ended up strained, and Don Cecilio had to close his hotel.
