= Milagro y magia =

Mexican telenovela

- Genre: Telenovela; Drama
- Written by: Florinda Meza
- Directed by: Roberto Gómez Bolaños
- Starring: Florinda Meza; Miguel Palmer; Ofelia Guilmáin; Carlos Bracho; Tony Carbajal; Rafael Sánchez Navarro; Juan Antonio Edwards
- Opening theme: Milagro y Magia by Roberto Gómez Bolaños; Willy Gutiérrez
- Country of origin: Mexico
- Original language: Spanish
- No. of episodes: 90

Production
- Executive producers: Roberto Gómez Bolaños; Florinda Meza
- Production locations: Mexico City, Mexico
- Running time: 41-45 minutes
- Production company: Televisa

Original release
- Network: Canal de las Estrellas
- Release: 29 April – 30 August 1991

Milagro y magia (English title: Miracle and magic) is a Mexican telenovela produced by Roberto Gómez Bolaños and Florinda Meza for Televisa in 1991. It starred by Florinda Meza, Miguel Palmer, Ofelia Guilmáin, Tony Carbajal, Carlos Bracho and Rafael Sánchez Navarro.

== Plot ==
After the Mexican Revolution, two orphans, Elisa and Pepe, leave the province for the capital. They are trying to survive. During the trip they meet an older child, Adrian, who takes them to his home. Here lives Macaria, an old witch that gathers and exploits children, send them to steal.

After some years, Adrian tries to violate Elisa and Pepe to save it hurts Adrian, then the two beyond Mexico City. Then they have to be separated. Wandering the streets, Elisa finds Roberto, an acrobat, and his dog. He helps her. With them: Don Roque and Dona Rufina, two janitors who treat Elisa as a daughter.

Roberto and Elisa loved each other, but he is afraid because he is 20 years older than her. In its tour are Pepe and go to work in a small circus. By mistake, Roberto believed to be the father of Elisa, then lost sight of each other, but Elisa will look to him for many years.

Then she meets Carlos Andrade, a theater critic who falls for her. He offers her to work in radio and television. Elisa becomes a movie star and meets a magnate: George Higgins, separated from his wife. She moves in with him and becomes pregnant.

During a trip to New York, George dies in a plane crash and Elisa remains the sole heir, shortly after giving birth to a girl named Fabiola. Elisa refuses to marry Carlos because she thinks of Roberto.

But later, Elisa marries Arturo a swindler. This marriage is a failure. Elisa finally succeeds in finding Roberto, but he is dying in a hospital. Fabiola is now fiancée of Hector, who is the son of Roberto and Elisa the past returns ...

== Cast ==
- Florinda Meza as Elisa Carmichael
- Miguel Palmer as Roberto
- Rafael Sánchez Navarro as Carlos Andrade
- Ofelia Guilmáin as Rufina
- Tony Carbajal as Roque
- Carlos Bracho as George O'Higgins
- Juan Antonio Edwards as Pepe
- Paulina Gómez Fernández as Fabiola
- Xavier Ximénez as Hector
- Lucía Guilmáin as Macaria
- Miguel Pizarro as Adrián "El Coyote"
- Miguel Angel Infante as Álvaro
- Alberto Angel "El Cuervo" as Raúl
- Lizzeta Romo as Salomé
- Lili Inclán as Jimena
- Eugenia Avendaño as Jacinta
- Inés Morales as Cristina
- Roberto Cañedo as Serafín
- Laura Luz as Sofía
- Moisés Suárez as Valerio
- Héctor Yaber as Arturo
- Leticia Montaño as Marina
- Carlos Feria as Francisco
- Raquel Morell as Yolanda
- Lorena Patricia as Margot Escalante
- Roberto Columba as Police
- Lucy Reina as Lucía
- Pablo Aura as Polilla
- Christian Gascón as Polilla (child)
- Karla Talavera as Elisa (child)
- Micheline Kinery as Gabriela
- Nahamin Pérez Fana as Elisa María
- Paola Rojas as Fabiola (child)

== Awards and nominations ==
Year	Award	Category	Nominee	Result
1992	10th TVyNovelas Awards	Best Leading Actress	Ofelia Guilmáin	Nominated
1992	10th TVyNovelas Awards	Best Leading Actor	Tony Carbajal	Won
1992	10th TVyNovelas Awards	Best Supporting Actor	Juan Antonio Edwards	Nominated
1992	10th TVyNovelas Awards	Best Original Story or Adaptation	Florinda Meza	Won
