= Chespirito =

Mexican actor, comedian, filmmaker (1929–2014)

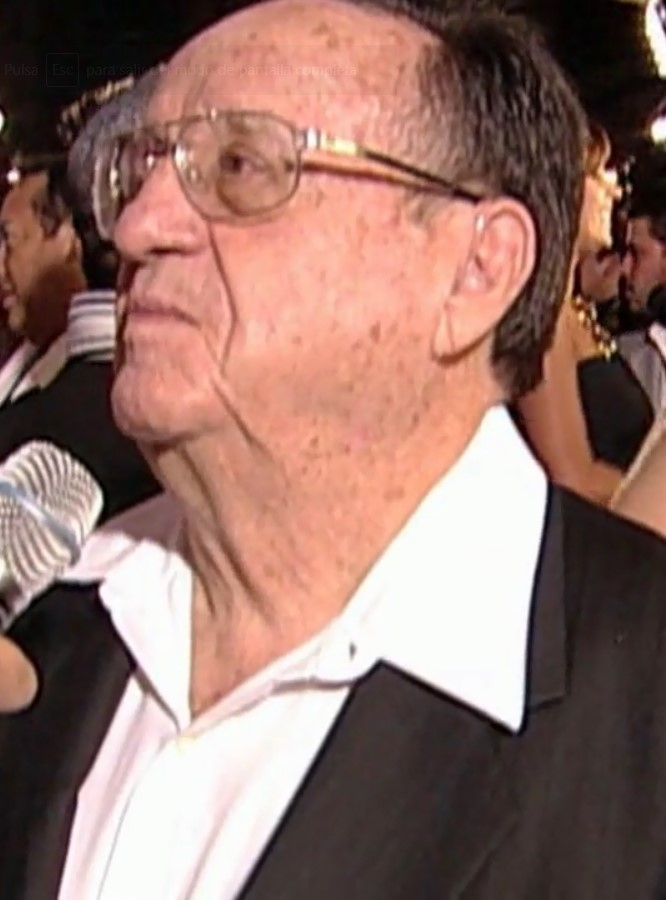
- Chespirito in 2008
- Born: Roberto Mario Gómez y Bolaños; 21 February 1929; Mexico City, Mexico
- Died: 28 November 2014 (aged 85); Cancún, Quintana Roo, Mexico
- Resting place: Panteón Francés de la Piedad, Mexico City
- Occupations: Actor; comedian; screenwriter; director; producer
- Spouses: Graciela Fernández (m. 1956; div. 1979) Florinda Meza (m. 2004)
- Children: 6, including Roberto Gómez Fernández
- Notable work: Chespirito; El Chapulín Colorado; El Chavo del Ocho; La Chicharra

Comedy career
- Years active: 1947–2014
- Medium: Television, film, music, theatre, comic books
- Genres: Sketch, farce, physical comedy, sitcom, satire
- Subjects: Children, language, parody, superheroes, social issues

Roberto Mario Gómez y Bolaños (21 February 1929 – 28 November 2014), more commonly known by his stage name Chespirito (Spanish pronunciation: [tʃespiˈɾito], or "Little Shakespeare"), was a Mexican actor, comedian, screenwriter, songwriter, humorist, director, producer, and author. He is widely regarded as one of the icons of Spanish-speaking humor and entertainment and one of the greatest comedians of all time. He is also one of the most loved and respected comedians in Latin America. He is mostly known by his acting role Chavo from the sitcom El Chavo del Ocho.

== Early life ==
He was born in Mexico City on 21 February 1929 to Catholic parents. He was the second child of Francisco Gómez Linares, a painter and illustrator, who died at the age of 41 in 1935. In 1936, after the death of his father and facing economic hardship, his mother sent him to live with his aunt in Guadalajara, Jalisco. His mother, Elsa Bolaños Aguilar, was a bilingual secretary; she died of pancreatic cancer at the age of 66 in 1968. Elsa was the youngest child of Ramón Bolaños Cacho, a military doctor, and his Zacatecas-born wife, María Aguilar. Via his mother, Gómez Bolaños was a first cousin once removed of the President of Mexico from 1964 to 1970, Gustavo Díaz Ordaz. He had an older brother called Francisco (1926–2010), and a younger brother named Horacio Gómez Bolaños, who portrayed the character Godínez in El Chavo del Ocho, and an even older half-brother born of one of his father's liaisons.

During his youth in the Colonia del Valle neighborhood of Mexico City, Roberto Gómez Bolaños formed a close‑knit social group known as "Los Aracuanes," named after the Aracuan Bird from The Three Caballeros. The group, which included his brother Horacio and Arturo Durazo, would gather regularly at Parque Mariscal Sucre, engaging in shared activities, music, and youthful camaraderie. These early friendships played a formative role in Gómez Bolaños' personal life and creative development.

The group was later depicted in the 2025 Mexican miniseries Chespirito: Sin Querer Queriendo, which dramatizes Gómez Bolaños's early life and the formation of his friendships, showing how these experiences influenced his later creative work.

Before becoming an actor, Bolaños was an amateur boxer. He studied mechanical engineering at the National Autonomous University of Mexico (UNAM), but he never came to practice that profession. Before he became famous, he wrote a number of plays, contributed dialogue to Mexican film and television scripts, and secured some character-acting work. "Chespirito" was of short stature; his stage name was the Spanish phonetic pronunciation of William Shakespeare "Chespir" (pronounced "shespir") with diminutive suffix -"ito". Between 1960 and 1965 he dedicated himself to writing scripts for "Comedians and songs" and "El estudio de Pedro Vargas", which were the two programs with the highest audience in Mexico.

== Career ==
=== Beginnings ===
Chespirito was discovered as an actor while waiting in line to apply for a job as a writer; soon he began writing and starring in his children's comedy shows. Chespirito's first show was Los Supergenios de la Mesa Cuadrada, a sketch comedy show that premiered in 1968; the show also starred Ramón Valdés, María Antonieta de las Nieves, and Rubén Aguirre. Los Supergenios was later renamed Chespirito y la Mesa Cuadrada and later Chespirito. The characters El Chavo, El Chapulín Colorado, and Dr. Chapatín were introduced on this show (1972, 1970 and 1968 respectively).

=== El Chavo del Ocho and El Chapulín Colorado ===
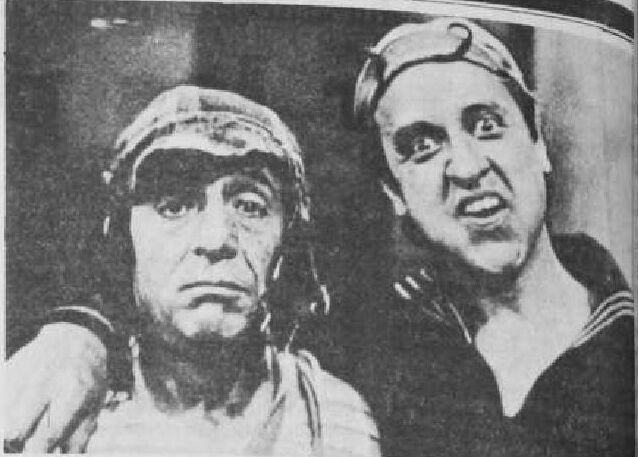
Bolaños dressed as El Chavo with Carlos Villagrán characterized as Quico

His best known roles were in the shows El Chavo del Ocho and El Chapulín Colorado. Both series premiered in 1973 and were based on sketches of the same name from Los Supergenios. The shows were produced by Mexican TV network Televisa and aired in 124 countries. Other shows produced by and starring Chespirito were the short-lived La Chicharra from 1979 and a second version of Chespirito from 1980 to 1995.

In El Chavo, Chespirito played an 8-year-old boy who often took refuge inside a wooden rain barrel in a Mexican neighborhood, and in El Chapulín Colorado he played a good-hearted superhero who gets involved in humorous situations.

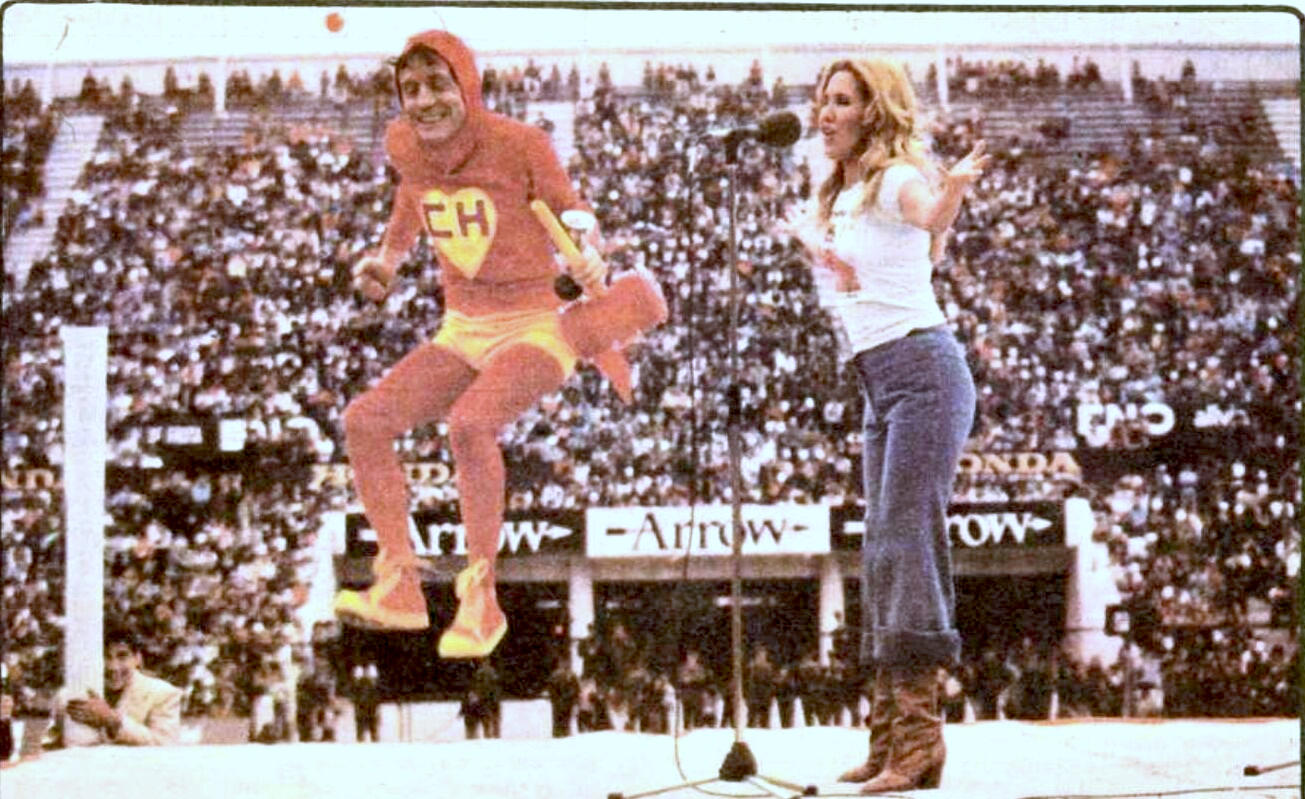
Bolaños dressed as El Chapulín Colorado with Florinda Meza in 1977

El Chavo and El Chapulín Colorado have become cultural icons all over Latin America and have aired in many countries worldwide.

Roberto Gómez Bolaños was also noted as a composer. He started writing music as a hobby, and most of his early musical work was related to his comedy work, featured particularly in occasional Chapulín Colorado or Chavo del Ocho special episodes. Later works include the theme songs for various Mexican movies and telenovelas, such as Alguna Vez Tendremos Alas and La Dueña. He is also the creator of the theater comedy Once y Doce (Eleven and Twelve), the most successful theater comedy in Mexican history; it is still played occasionally.

== Works by Chespirito ==
- Los Supergenios de la Mesa Cuadrada (1968–1973), renamed Chespirito y la Mesa Cuadrada in 1970 and Chespirito in 1971.
- El Ciudadano Gómez (1968–1969; 1973; 1994–1995), a parody of Citizen Kane.

Chespirito as Dr. Chapatín in Chespirito

- Dr. Chapatín (1968–1979; 1980–1995), one of the presenters of Los Supergenios who starred in sketches in the show, also appeared in the El Chapulín Colorado half-hour show of 1973–1979. He represents an old doctor who constantly has fights and confusions due to his old age and hitting people with a paper bag whose contents were never revealed in-sketch. In an interview, Chespirito revealed that Dr. Chapatín carried in his bag all the bad feelings of the people, which is why it hurt a lot. Dr. Chapatín's character did a small cameo in the movies "El Chanfle", "El Chanfle 2", "Don Ratón y Don Ratero", and "El Charrito".
- Chespirito (character) (1968–1975; 1980–1986; 1991–1992; 1994–1995), occasionally starred in sketches of the Los Supergenios as a "character".
- El Chapulín Colorado (1970–1973; 1973–1979; 1980–1993), second most successful character of Bolaños; became a weekly half-hour show in 1973. A naive but brave superhero who always tries to help people in problems.

Chespirito as Chaparrón Bonaparte in Chespirito

- Los Chifladitos (1970–1972; 1980–1995), starred alongside Rubén Aguirre, one of the main sketches of the Los Supergenios until Aguirre left the show. Chespirito did Chaparron Bonaparte and Aguirre, Lucas Tañeda, as a pair of demented characters who ran in several confusions by the use of puns and the unexpected convulsions of Chaparron called "Chiripiorcas".
- Los Caquitos (1970–1975; 1980–1995) became the third most successful creation of Bolaños; sketches were created until 1975. Originally they were Chespirito as Chómpiras and Ramón Valdés as Peterete. In the sketches of the 80s, Édgar Vivar took the place of Valdés, playing a new character named El Botija, while Florinda Meza got a new character for the sketches as La Chimoltrufia, Botija's wife. It became Chespirito's main act in the last years of his program due to him being too old to perform his other characters.
- Los Chiripiojos (1972), is the family La Chimoltrufia.
- El Chavo del Ocho (1971–1973; 1973–1980; 1980–1992), created as immediate successor of Los Chifladitos; become a weekly half-hour show in 1973. Is about a poor kid who lives in a small neighborhood with other families who share comic situations. It's Chespirito's most successful character.
- La Chicharra (1979–1982), half-hour show that replaced El Chapulín Colorado in 1979. He tried to create something new with a newspaper reporter who happens to take the wrong news in the wrong place. The show's lead character, Vicente Chambon, originally appeared as part of Chespirito in its early days.
- Don Calavera (1994–1995), the nickname of Carlos Vera, a mortician who likes to flirt with widows, is the last character created by Chespirito, appears only in the 1980–1995 version of the Chespirito show.

== Later years ==
On 19 November 2004, after 27 years together, he married actress and longtime companion Florinda Meza, who starred as Doña Florinda in El Chavo. After show production was stopped for El Chavo and El Chapulín Colorado, both toured Mexico and the rest of Latin America and the United States with different plays, sometimes playing the characters who made them famous. In 2003, Chespirito and Florinda Meza received the keys to the town of Cicero, Illinois.

During Mexico's presidential campaigns of 2000 and 2006 he openly supported the National Action Party (PAN) by appearing in TV commercials and urging people to vote for the party's candidates, Vicente Fox and Felipe Calderón. For the 2012 race, he made public that he would vote for the Partido Accion Nacional (PAN) candidate, Josefina Vázquez Mota, but did not appear in a commercial. In 2007, he joined a campaign led by Catholics and conservatives against the legalization of abortion in Mexico City.

He shared that while pregnant with him, his mother suffered an accident and the doctor advised her to get an abortion; she refused. He also wrote the books El Diario de El Chavo del Ocho ("The Diary of El Chavo del Ocho"), ...Y También Poemas ("...And Poems Too"), and Sin Querer Queriendo: Memorias ("Accidentally on Purpose: Memoirs"). In 2009, he was also honored by the Colombian TV-channel RCN in which he received the keys of the municipality of Soacha; more than 20,000 people attended the homage. On 12 November 2009, he was admitted to a Mexico City hospital due to prostate complications, which required a simple surgery to treat. He was released from treatment the following day.

On 29 February 2012, a celebration of Chespirito's life and work was held at the Auditorio Nacional. The special, titled América celebra a Chespirito, was a multinational tribute that gathered a diverse group of actors, singers, and fans from 17 nations. They included Armando Manzanero, Thalía, Ximena Navarrete, Marco Antonio Regil, Juan Gabriel, Diego Verdaguer, Gian Marco, Pandora, Reik, and OV7. Chespirito's ill health was apparent: he was in a wheelchair, required oxygen tanks, and could not stay the entire program. Nonetheless, he expressed great emotion and gratitude for the tribute. The special was broadcast across the participating nations on 11 March.

Over Twitter, Chespirito denounced the actions of the Yo Soy 132 movement after the takeover of Televisa Chapultepec following the 2012 election. In 2012, Chespirito was honored by his friends and former cast members, putting an end to many rumors that the comedian was dying. Even so, former colleagues such as Édgar Vivar expressed their concern publicly for Chespirito's poor health.

== Death ==
At 2:30 PM (19:30 GMT) on Friday, 28 November 2014, Chespirito died from heart failure as a complication of Parkinson's disease at the age of 85, in his home in Cancún, Quintana Roo, Mexico. Many Mexican celebrities and Chespirito's former co-stars took to Twitter to express their feelings and send their condolences to Chespirito's widow and family. Such celebrities and former co-stars included George Lopez, Eugenio Derbez, Carlos Villagrán, Édgar Vivar, Rubén Aguirre, and María Antonieta de las Nieves. Chespirito is widely regarded as one of the most renowned Spanish-language comedians of the 20th century.

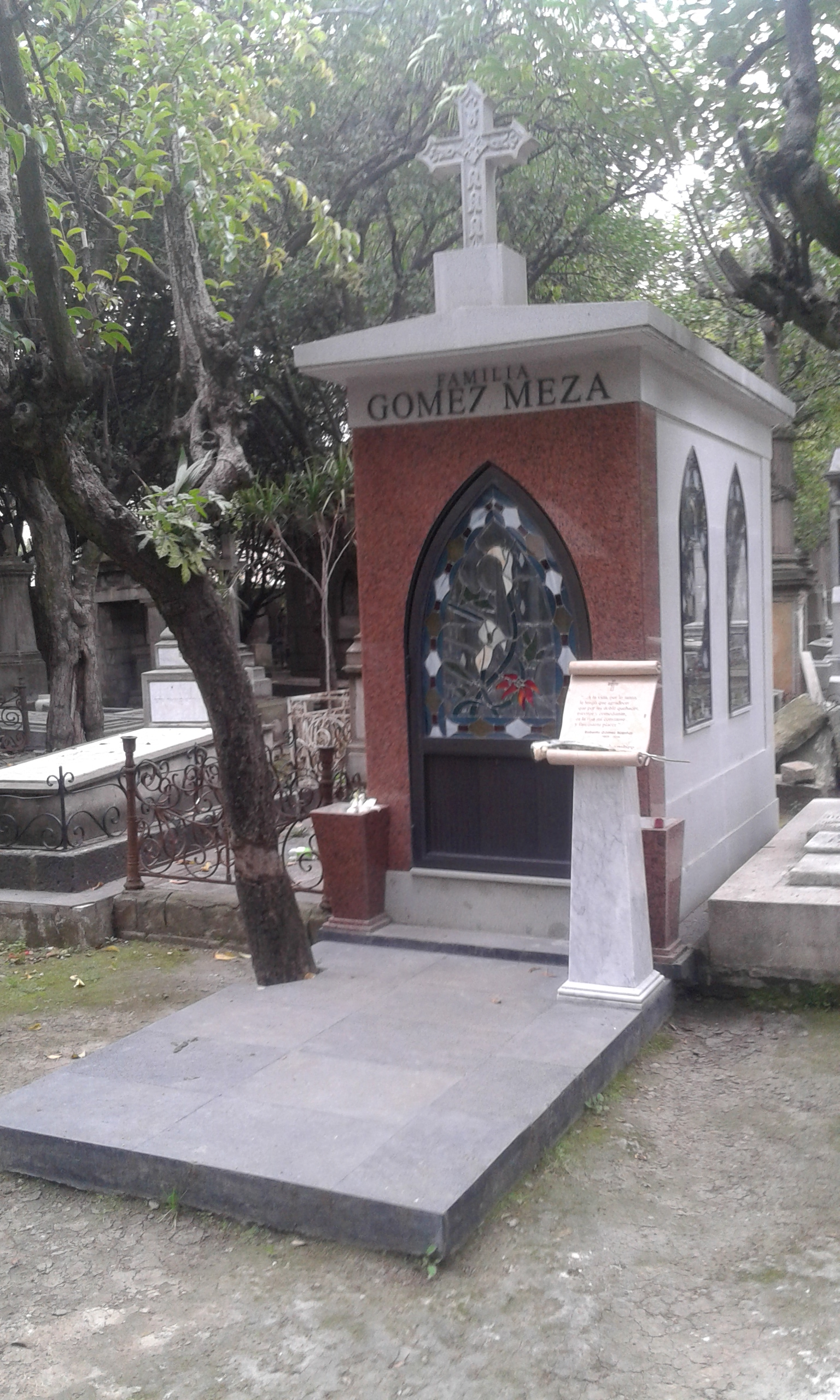
Grave of Bolaños, photographed in 2016. It is located inside the Panteón Francés de la Piedad in Mexico City

On 1 December 2014, he was buried at the Panteón Francés de la Piedad cemetery in Mexico City, following a private funeral on Saturday and a public one held on Sunday at the Estadio Azteca stadium which attended by about 40,000 fans.

== Legacy ==
Chespirito has been described as one of the most recognized Mexican comedians of the 20th century as well as being well known and honored in all of Latin America. He has been honored for his creative writing, characters, comedic pick-up lines, and for his clean humor style. His TV shows have been made into cartoons since 2006 (El Chavo Animado, with some other Chespirito characters appearing in the show). The animated show has been translated into English, Portuguese, and French. An animated TV show based on another famous Chespirito character, El Chapulín Colorado, was announced in 2015. It aired the first episode online on 13 April.

=== Tributes ===
In 2000, Televisa gave him a tribute entitled "No contaban con mi astucia," commemorating the thirty-year anniversary of the humorous program El Chavo del Ocho. In 2004, the Art Chroniclers Association (ACROARTE) of the Dominican Republic and the National Dominican Brewery awarded him the Soberano Award in recognition of his career in Latin American television and his many facets as a writer, screenwriter, actor, comedian and producer. In 2012, there was a tribute called "América celebra a Chespirito" also made by Televisa, with the popular singer Thalía performing a song written by Gian Marco Zignago. The Google Doodle of 21 February 2020, honored Chespirito.

=== Parodies ===
Writers for The Simpsons have said that they created the Bumblebee Man character after watching El Chapulín Colorado on Univision, whose show was "always on" in the channel. His show consists of simple skits, often involving heavy slapstick and set in an empty room, and is almost always on the air when the Spanish-language channel is depicted. In the episode "Team Homer", his full name is shown to be "Pedro Chespirito". In 2003, his voice actor, Hank Azaria, won a Primetime Emmy Award for Outstanding Voice-Over Performance for voicing Bumblebee Man and various other characters.

In 2025, following the controversy surrounding Bad Bunny's performance in the Super Bowl LX halftime show, a sketch based on El Chavo del Ocho appeared in the first episode of Saturday Night Live's 51st season, with Bad Bunny playing Quico.

== Controversies ==
In 2000 and 2006, Roberto Gómez Bolaños participated in television advertisements supporting the electoral campaigns of the National Action Party. In 2006, he also wrote a letter to then-candidate Andrés Manuel López Obrador, asking him not to divide Mexicans.

In April 2007, he joined the claim of Catholic and conservative groups that were fighting to maintain abortion as a crime in the Federal District, against the position of the Legislative Assembly, whose representatives were inclined to decriminalize it during the first twelve weeks of gestation. Gómez Bolaños participated in television propaganda against the new law. He is known for comments on Pablo Picasso's Guernica painting, such as those made at the beginning of May 2007, in Colombia, where he declared that the work "is a caricature."

When asked who had been the best president of Mexico, Chespirito replied: "Gustavo Díaz Ordaz in some things and not because he was my uncle, whom nobody wanted. Before 1968, he was the best president, and if we look at the numbers of the inflation that Mexico experienced is justified. Then, Salinas, although he had not won, but he was extremely intelligent. And the same thing happens with Fox, his figures are better after Díaz Ordaz pa'cá. Now, the most accurate answer I can give is: none."

Fernando Rodríguez Mondragón, son of Colombian drug lord Gilberto Rodríguez Orejuela, head of the extinct Cali Cartel in Colombia and author of the book El hijo del ajedrecista, pointed out that Roberto Gómez Bolaños performed at a party for one of the sons of the heads of the aforementioned cartel. Given this information, Gómez Bolaños' immediate response was that he had never been linked to drug trafficking in any of its forms, but María Antonieta de las Nieves assured that El show de Chespirito was presented at the celebration of a first communion for the family of the drug dealer.

=== Accusations of support for dictatorships ===
According to El Financiero, Roberto Gómez Bolaños was severely criticized for traveling to South American nations that were under the yoke of dictators such as Jorge Rafael Videla in Argentina, and Augusto Pinochet in Chile. Eduardo Bautista wrote that "According to the comedian himself, the cast of El Chavo visited all the countries of the continent, [...] The case most criticized by the Mexican media was, perhaps; that of 1978, when Chespirito traveled to Santiago, the Chilean capital, during Pinochet's regime," appearing at the Chilean National Stadium, where he had a record audience of 80,000. On the other hand, at the Quinta Vergara stage during the Viña del Mar Festival, "thousands of fans also attended, who even had to be accommodated in the surrounding mountainous areas, as the place had exceeded its quota."

Gómez Bolaños received negative criticism from the Mexican press for having appeared at the National Stadium, a place that had been used as a concentration camp. Bolaños did not respond to these accusations until 2005 in the book Sin querer queriendo, he clarified that "none of the actors was aware that the stadium had been a concentration camp" and that, had they known it, "we would have worked there anyway". He goes on to say that, according to that logic, "no actor should present themselves in the Zócalo where the memory of all those who were murdered during the Ten Tragic Days was muddied". The comedian also expressed his happiness for having performed at the National Stadium: "How can we forget the long standing ovation that they gave us while we did an Olympic lap twice, even though we ended up puffing with exhaustion? It was worth it, wasn't it?".

=== Legal Issues with Maria Antonieta De Las Nieves ===
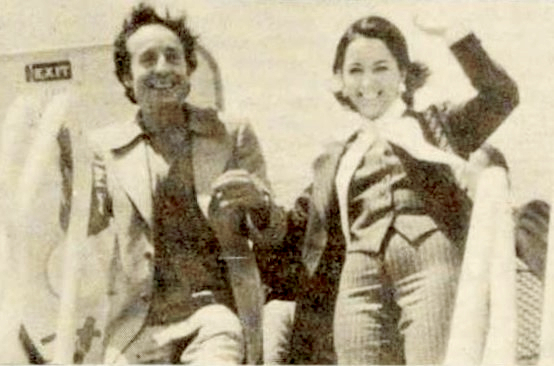
Bolaños and María Antonieta de las Nieves in 1977

In July 2013, Maria Antonieta announced that she finally won a lawsuit against Chespirito, backed by Televisa which began in 2001 for the misuse of her character La Chilindrina. "You have the scoop of knowing that I have already won the lawsuit against Televisa and Chespirito. Chilindrina is already mine and no one can take her away from me," De Las Nieves said at a press conference in Lima, the capital of Peru. According to the American-Mexican media Univision, on 26 July 2013, Gomez Bolaños told them that "the day El Chavo ended, everyone did whatever they wanted with their character, that's how I wanted to do it. I said I was going to continue, he said yes, but later he regretted it and said no." Unlike Carlos Villagran who left the show in 1978, Maria Antonieta stayed on the show until the late-1990s.

=== Series stopped all airings ===
On 31 July 2020, all TV channels and streaming services that broadcast any of Chespirito's series announced that they were no longer broadcasting it from the next day on. Currently, the reason they gave was because the contract expired that day, and Televisa (owner of the series) didn't update it due to revenue disputes with Grupo Chespirito (owner of all episode scripts and almost all characters).

Currently, the only exception to this rule is El Chavo: The Animated Series broadcasting in Brazil, being still broadcast on SBT via the Sábado Animado block and still available locally on Amazon Prime Video.

=== Series resumes some airings ===
On 7 September 2024, it was announced by Florinda Meza on Twitter/X that El Chavo and El Chapulín Colorado would be returning to television after a four-year absence. Both shows would be returning to UniMas and Univision, and streaming on Vix beginning 21 September 2024. The show would return to Las Estrellas in Mexico a month later.

== Theatre work ==
Year	Title	Role
1985	Títere	José Grillo
1992-2009	Once y doce	Eloy Madrazo

== Filmography ==
=== TV series ===
Year	Title
1956–1967	Cómicos y Canciones
1968–1970	Sábados de la Fortuna
1969–1970	El Ciudadano Gómez
1970–1971	Los Supergenios de la Mesa Cuadrada
1971–1995	Chespirito
1973–1979	El Chapulín Colorado
1973–1980	El Chavo del Ocho
1979–1980	La Chicharra
1993–1994	Con humor... al estilo Chespirito

=== Films ===
Year	Title	Role
1960	Dos locos en escena	Don Juan
1960	Dos criados malcriados	
1967	El mundo loco de los jóvenes	
1968	Operación carambola	Carlitos
1968	El zángano	Psychologist
1969	La princesa hippie	Damian Damianoski
1970	Las tres magnificas	Manolo
1970	El amor de Maria Isabel	Driving instructor
1970	El cuerpazo del delito	Goliath
1970	La hermana Trinquete	
1979	El Chanfle	Chanfle
1982	El Chanfle 2	Chanfle
1983	Don ratón y don ratero	Ratón Pérez
1984	Charrito	Charrito
1988	Música de Viento	Sr. Quevedo

=== Director ===
Year	Title
1958	Los legionarios
1959	Tres lecciones de amor
1962	¡En peligro de muerte!
1984	Charrito
1991	Milagro y magia

=== Producer ===
Year	Title
1997	Elisa Before the End of the World
1997	Un baúl lleno de miedo

== Awards and nominations ==
=== TVyNovelas Awards ===
Year	Category	TV series	Result	Ref
1987	Best comedy actor	Chespirito	Won	
1987	Best comedy program	Chespirito	Won	
1991	Best comedy actor	Chespirito	Won	

=== ACE Awards ===
Year	Category	Result	Ref
2008	Extraordinary Awards	Won	

On 20 November 2013, Chespirito received the Ondas Iberoamericano Award for the most outstanding career on television.

== Discography ==
- 1977: Chespirito y Sus Canciones - ¡No Contaban Con Mi Astucia! (Discos Fontana)
- 1977: Así Cantamos y Vacilamos en la Vecindad del Chavo (Discos Fontana)
- 1979: 1er Festival de la Canción Infantil de Radio Variedades - Canta Chespirito y su Compañía
- 1980: El Chavo Canta - ¡Eso, Eso, Eso...! (Discos Fontana)
- 1981: Síganme los Buenos a la Vecindad del Chavo (Discos Fontana)
- 1989: Chaves (Polydor Records Brazil/SBT)

== Books ==
- 1995: El diario del Chavo del 8 ISBN 978-607-111-041-1, 607-111-041-6
- 2003: ...y también poemas ISBN 978-607-111-032-9, 607-111-032-7
- 2006: ¡Sin querer queriendo! ISBN 9786071110565

== See also ==
- Cantinflas
