= Rubén Aguirre =

Mexican actor (1934–2016)

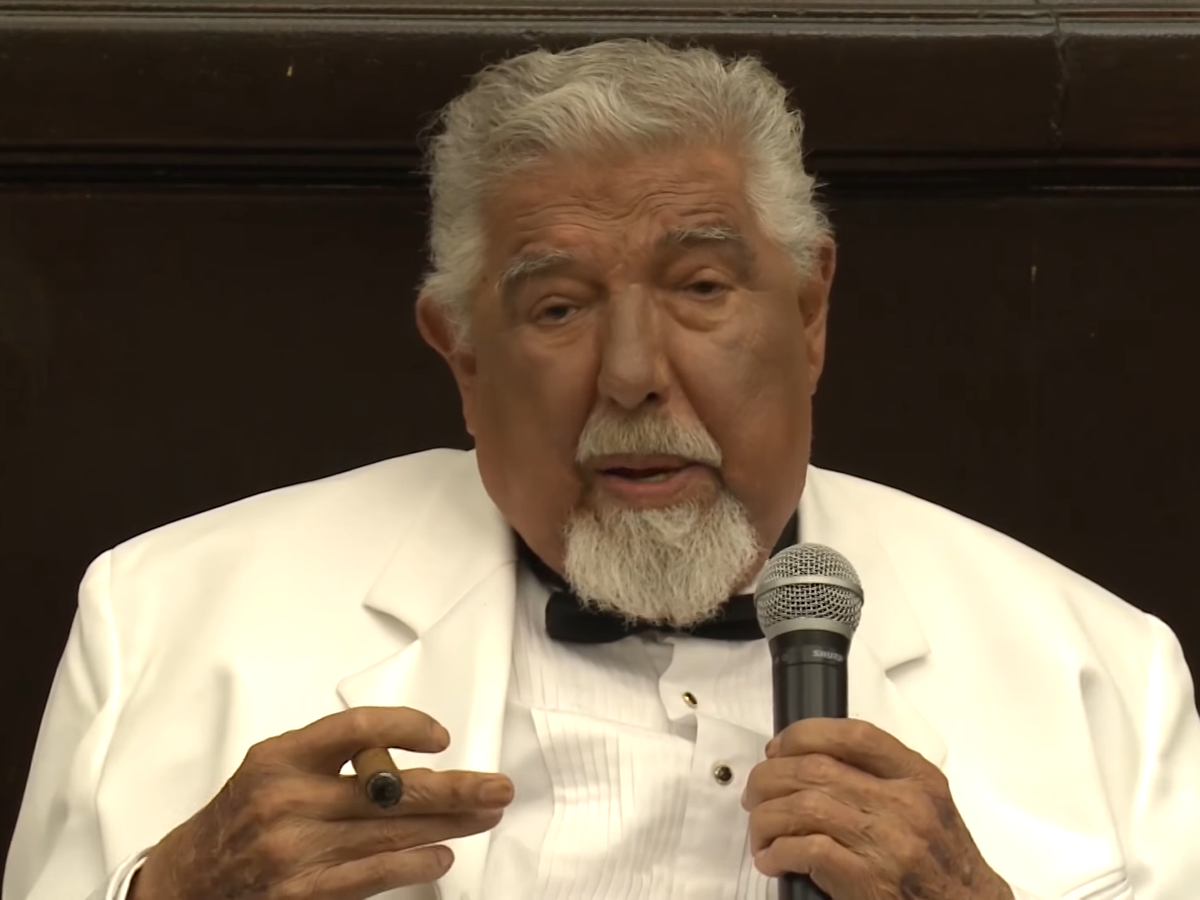
- Aguirre in 2016
- Born: Rubén Aguirre Fuentes; 15 June 1934; Saltillo, Coahuila, Mexico
- Died: 17 June 2016 (aged 82); Puerto Vallarta, Jalisco, Mexico
- Occupations: Actor; producer; comedian; screenwriter; director
- Years active: 1967–2016
- Notable work: Professor Jirafales in El Chavo del Ocho
- Height: 1.96 m (6 ft 5 in)
- Spouse: Consuelo de los Reyes (m. 1959)
- Children: 7

Rubén Aguirre Fuentes (Spanish pronunciation: [ruˈβen aˈɣire ˈfwentes]; 15 June 1934 – 17 June 2016) was a Mexican actor and comedian. He was best known for his character Professor Jirafales in Televisa's 1970s television show El Chavo del Ocho. Aguirre also participated in another well known television show of the era, El Chapulín Colorado, albeit less frequently.

== Life and education ==
Rubén Aguirre was born on 15 June 1934 in the neighborhood of Santa Anita located at Saltillo, Coahuila, Mexico.

In his book Después de Usted (After You, a common phrase used by his character Professor Jirafales), published in February 2015, he wrote about the difficulty of finding higher education institutions in Mexico during the mid 1950s, since there were very few schools. This is why in his late teenage years, he moved to Ciudad Juárez, Chihuahua, to study in one of the most renowned universities of that time, the Escuela Superior de Agricultura Hermanos Escobar (Hermanos Escobar Higher School of Agriculture), where he studied Agricultural Engineering.

Once in Juárez, he would regularly cross into the United States, since according to his memoir, "it was so easy to cross the border back then, I remember I would put on my college jacket on and since the gringo would see that you were a student, he would let you through". Rubén Aguirre worked many times as a gardener in El Paso to make ends meet.

It was in Juárez, as well, where he began his career in the media as an unofficial radio host and bullfighting commentator. His passion to become a radio announcer was so big that he paused his college education to travel to Mexico City and get his radio license.

He returned to Juárez and began working as a radio host; he married his wife Consuelo de los Reyes, whom he met at a bullfight, finished his degree in Agricultural Engineering with a minor in Mechanized Systems and some time after he moved to Monterrey, Nuevo León, where he began his acting career and met Roberto Gómez Bolaños.

== Work ==
When he first began looking for acting work, Ruben was told that at 1.96 meters (6 ft 5 in), he was too tall. Nevertheless, despite his height, Aguirre was able to begin his acting career in Monterrey, Nuevo León, working with a character named Pipo, a famous clown. His acting caught the eye of Mexican producer Roberto Gómez Bolaños who asked him to work with him in Mexico City. Aguirre went on to Mexico City where he worked on several television scripts with Gómez Bolaños, creator and main star of both El Chavo and El Chapulín Colorado.

Aguirre garnered fame across Latin America when both El Chavo and El Chapulín Colorado became major international hits. The group of actors that comprised the casts of both shows toured often, and sometimes they would venture out on their own. Aguirre was not the exception, visiting such places as Puerto Rico, Venezuela and Brazil many times. Chespirito owned the rights to El Chavo and El Chapulín Colorado. After Aguirre's participation in both shows was over, he moved to Argentina and opened a circus there. Chespirito had no copyrights in Argentina, and Aguirre was able to name his circus El Circo del Profesor Jirafales.

== Death ==
Aguirre died on 17 June 2016, from pneumonia complications at his home in Puerto Vallarta, Mexico, two days after his 82nd birthday.

== Filmography ==
Some of Aguirre's acting roles were in:

- El Chavo del Ocho (1973–1980, TV Series) as Professor Jirafales
- El Chapulín Colorado (1973–1979, TV Series) as Various Characters
- Santo y Blue Demon contra el Dr. Frankenstein (1974) as Dr. Genaro Molina
- El Moro de Cumpas (1977) as Señor cura
- Lo Veo y no lo Creo (1977)
- Capulina Chisme Caliente (1977)
- La Hora del Jaguar (1978)
- El Chanfle (1979) as Sr. Matute
- Mi Caballo el Cantador (1979) as Padre Aparicio
- Chespirito (1970–1972; 1980–1995, TV Series) as Lucas Tañeda / Sargento Refugio / Professor Jirafales / Dr. Rafael Contreras
- Sabor a Sangre (1980) as Sacerdote
- Aventuras en Marte (1981) as Astronaut
- El Chanfle 2 (1982) as Sr. Matute
- Viva el Chubasco (1983)
- Don Ratón y don Ratero (1983) as Rufino Rufián
- Charrito (1984) as Director
- Escuadrón Sida (1987)
- Este Vampiro es un Tiro (1991)
- El Chivo (1992) as Padre Correa
- Fray Valentino II (1994)
- Las Aventuras de Fray Valentino (1994) as Fray Valentino
- El Show del Vampiro (2004)
