= Édgar Vivar =

Mexican actor

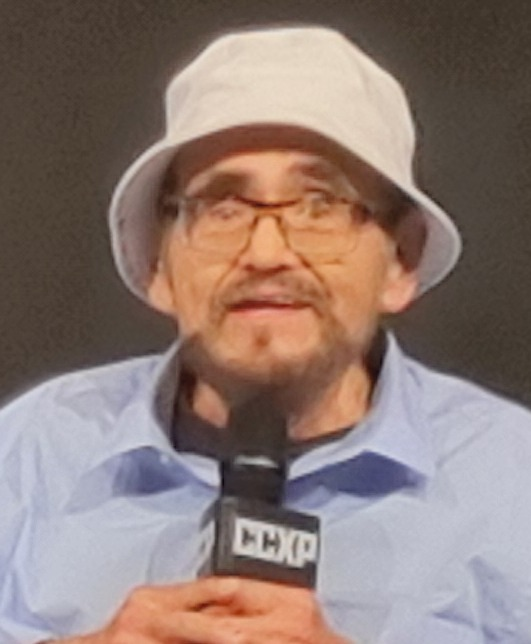
- Vivar in 2024
- Born: Édgar Ángel Vivar Villanueva; 28 December 1948 (age 77); Mexico City, Mexico
- Occupation: Actor
- Years active: 1964–present

Édgar Ángel Vivar Villanueva (born 28 December 1948) is a Mexican actor and comedian. He is best known for his characters of Señor Barriga and his son Ñoño from El Chavo del Ocho, and El Botija from Los Caquitos and Chespirito.

== Life and career ==
The son of engineer Ángel Vivar and Celia Villanueva Falconi, Vivar started his acting career in 1964 as a theater actor. He toured the United States with some of his plays. This gave him vast experience in the acting field.

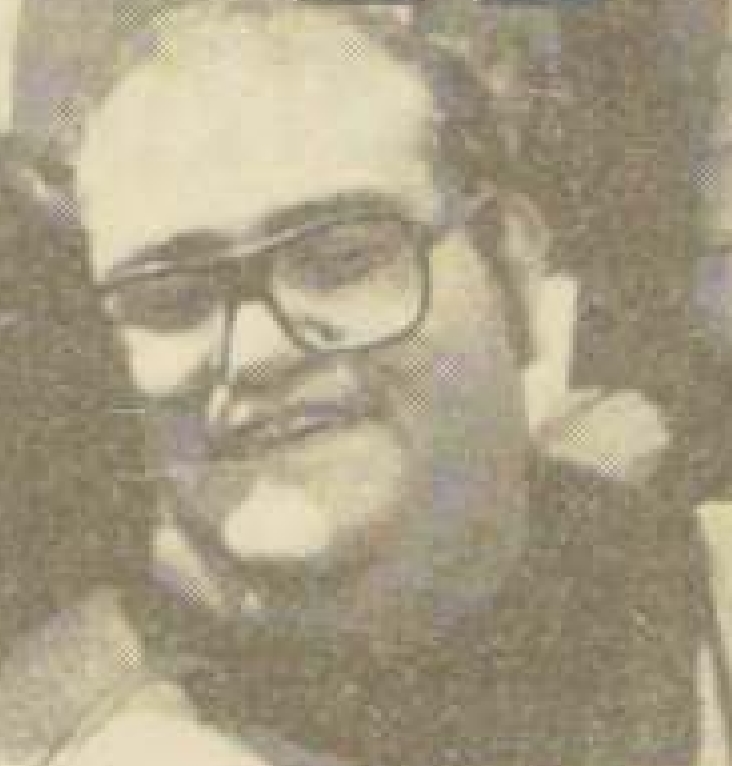
Vivar in 1977

In 1970, Chespirito needed a robust person to play Señor Barriga as well as Ñoño in his upcoming Televisa production of El Chavo del Ocho, and Vivar was hired for the job. Both shows became major international hits, allowing Vivar to become known beyond Mexico and to tour all over Latin America, Spain and the United States. He also made an attempt at becoming a telenovela actor, participating in his co-star Florinda Meza's production, Alguna vez Tendremos Alas.

His weight caused him serious heart-related issues after the half-hour Chespirito productions were over in 1980 (it is believed that his temporary absence from the show may have related to his weight; and was explained that his character, el Botija, had gone to a weight-loss clinic). In 1992, he left the hour-long Chespirito program briefly for therapy at a weight-loss clinic. He lost a great amount of weight, which helped save his life. He kept touring the countries where Chespirito shows were kept on television as re-runs after the show was over.

In 2006, Vivar appeared in the film Bandidas as a bank manager. He also co-starred in a telenovela made in Argentina, Amarte Así, that became a major success in South America, Spain, and the US. He had a role in Guillermo del Toro's production of El Orfanato, filmed in Spain and released in October 2007. He would later voice Auguste Gusteau and Dug in the Latin American versions of Disney-Pixar's Ratatouille and Up (2009).

In 2008, Vivar underwent gastric bypass surgery at a clinic in Colombia, and lost approximately 165 pounds. Following his surgery, he has become an advocate for healthy living, particularly for overcoming obesity.

Following his weight loss surgery, Vivar retired all of his Chespirito characters, stating that because of his weight loss, they were no longer appropriate. He would, however, reprise the voices of Señor Barriga and his son Ñoño for an episode of the animated adaptation of El Chavo, the only cast member from the original series to do so.

== Filmography ==
=== Film ===
Year	Title	Role	Notes
1979	El Chanfle	Dr. Nájera	
1982	El Chanfle 2	Dr. Nájera	
1983	Don Ratón y Don Ratero		
1983	El más valiente del mundo		
1984	Frankenstein's Great Aunt Tillie	Feldwebel Erstarren	
1987	Escuadrón sida		
1988	Musica de viento		
1992	Gordo	Gordo	Short film
2004	El show del vampiro	Vampiro Max	Short film, voice role
2006	Bandidas	Bank manager	
2007	El orfanato	Dr. Balabán	
2008	All Inclusive	Taxi driver	
2011	Juan & La Borrega		Short film
2015	Cementerio General 2	Psychiatric hospital director	
2018	Overboard	Papi's Gatroenterologist	
2021	The Mighty Victoria	Don Edgar	
2023	Soy inocente	Fran	
2024	El roomie	Homemade	

=== Television ===
Year	Title	Role	Notes
1971–1973; 1980–1995	Chespirito	Sr. Barriga, Noño, El Botija	
1973–1979	El Chavo del Ocho	Sr. Barriga, Noño, El Botija	
1973–1979	El Chapulín Colorado	Various characters	
1974	Mundo de juguete		
1997	Alguna vez tendremos alas	Sebastián Medina	
1998	¿Qué nos pasa?		
1998	Navidad fabuloja	Rey mago	
2000	No contaban con mi astucia	Himself	Guest
2002	De pe a pa	Himself	Guest
2005	Amarte así	Don Pedro	
2005	Aplausos	Himself	Guest
2005	Chespirito: 35 años en el corazón de México	Himself	
2010–2011	Para volver a amar	Renato	
2012	La familia P. Luche	Doctor	Episode "La enfermedad de Federica"
2025	Chespirito: Sin Querer Queriendo	Director Agustín P. Delgado	Episode 2
