= Florinda Meza =

Mexican actress (born 1949)

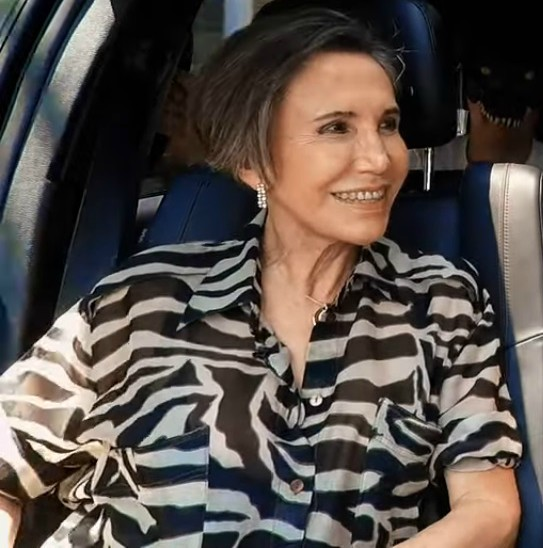
- Meza in May 2019
- Born: Florinda Meza García; 8 February 1949 (age 77); Juchipila, Zacatecas, Mexico
- Occupations: Actress; television producer; screenwriter
- Years active: 1969–present
- Notable work: Doña Florinda in El Chavo del Ocho
- Spouse: Chespirito (m. 2004; died 2014)

Florinda Meza García (born 8 February 1949) is a Mexican actress, comedian, television producer, and screenwriter. She is best known as Doña Florinda and Popis in El Chavo del Ocho, La Chimoltrufia in Chespirito, and other various roles in El Chapulín Colorado.

== Early life and career ==
Meza was born in Juchipila, Zacatecas, the daughter of Emilia García and Hector Meza.

She was cast by Roberto Gómez Bolaños to play Doña Florinda (and later Popis) in the Televisa sitcom El Chavo del Ocho, which would become a major international hit. The show would last from February 26, 1973, to January 7, 1980 (although the sketch would continue until 1992), during which she and Gómez Bolaños began a lifelong affair that never produced any children. During her tenure on the Chespirito television series, she was also known to have played Édgar Vivar's character "Botija"'s wife "María Expropiación Petronila Lascuráin y Torquemada", famously known as "La Chimoltrufia" in the sketch "Los Caquitos" (alongside Gómez Bolaños who played the role of Chómpiras). Meza would also participate prominent roles in Chespirito's other main sitcom, El Chapulín Colorado.

After production of Chespirito ended in 1995, she and Gómez Bolaños began touring extensively. The couple would eventually get married in a civil ceremony on 19 November 2004 after a 27-year relationship.

Meza would also participate in several movies, as well as produced telenovelas including La Dueña, Alguna Vez Tendremos Alas, and Milagro y Magia, in which she also acted.

== Filmography ==
=== As actress ===
Films
Year	Title	Role	Notes
1979	El chanfle	Tere	Debut film
1982	El chanfle II	Tere	
1983	Don ratón y don ratero	Aftadolfa	
1984	Charrito	Hija del Sheriff	
1988	Música de viento	Valentina	
2019	Dulce familia	Verónica	
2026	Atrévete a Vivir	Herself	Documentary

Television
Year	Title	Role	Notes
1971–1973	Chespirito	Doña Florinda	Lead role
1973–1980	El Chavo del Ocho	Doña Florinda / La Popis	Lead role
1973–1979	El Chapulín Colorado	Novia / Esposa / La Popis	
1973	La tierra		
1974	Mundo de juguete		
1979-1980	La chicharra	Cándida	
1980–1995	Chespirito	Doña Florinda / Cándida / Enfermera	Lead role
1991	Milagro y magia	Elisa	Lead role
1993	Con Humor	Various characters	

=== As a producer ===
Year	Title	Notes
1985	María de nadie	
1995	La dueña	Executive producer
1997	Alguna vez tendremos alas	Executive producer

== In popular culture ==
In 2025, Meza was portrayed in the series Chespirito: Not Really on Purpose by Bárbara López under the pseudonym Margarita Ruíz. Due to disagreements between producer Roberto Gómez Fernández and Florinda Meza over the storyline’s development and the alleged misuse of her likeness, they chose to remove her name and use “Margarita Ruiz” instead. The series portrays Meza's apparent relationship with Chespirito and other cast members. However, Meza has disputed what is depicted in the series and has claimed that it is a “distortion of the story.”
