= El Chapulín Colorado =

Mexican television program

- Genre: Adventure; Comedy; Slapstick; Superhero; Science Fantasy
- Created by: Roberto Gómez Bolaños
- Starring: Roberto Gómez Bolaños; Carlos Villagrán (1973–1978); Ramón Valdés (1973–1979); Florinda Meza; Rubén Aguirre; Angelines Fernández; Édgar Vivar; María Antonieta de las Nieves (1973; 1975–1979); Horacio Gómez Bolaños; Raul "Chato" Padilla (1979)
- Opening theme: "Finale" by John Williams
- Ending theme: "Baroque Hoedown" by Perrey and Kingsley
- Country of origin: Mexico
- No. of seasons: 7
- No. of episodes: 290 (list of episodes)

Production
- Running time: 30 minutes

Original release
- Network: Televisión Independiente de México (1973–1974); Las Estrellas (1975–1979)
- Release: 28 February 1973 – 26 September 1979

Related
- La Chicharra; El Chavo del Ocho

El Chapulín Colorado (Spanish pronunciation: [el tʃapuˈliŋ koloˈɾaðo], transl. The Red Grasshopper) is a Mexican superhero comedy television series that aired from 1973 to 1979 and parodied superhero shows. It was created by actor and comedian Roberto Gómez Bolaños, who also played the main character. It was first aired by Televisa in 1973 in Mexico, and then was aired across Latin America and Spain until 1981, alongside El Chavo del Ocho, which shared the same cast of actors. Both shows have endured in re-runs and have won back some of their popularity in several countries such as Brazil, Colombia, and Peru. Although the series has a regular cast, all actors but Roberto Gómez Bolaños play different characters each episode, and it is therefore described as an anthology series.

== Overview ==
El Chapulín Colorado
- El Chapulín Colorado/El Chavo del Ocho character
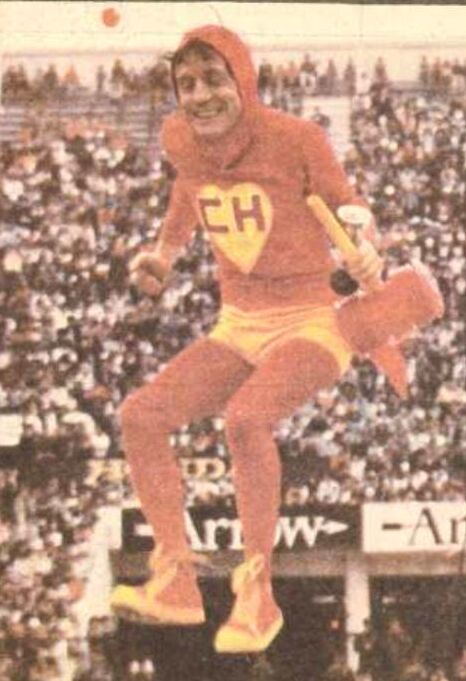
- Roberto Gómez Bolaños (Chespirito) as El Chapulín Colorado.
- First appearance: 1972
- Created by: Roberto Gómez Bolaños
- Portrayed by: Roberto Gómez Bolaños
- Voiced by: Roberto Gómez Bolaños (commercials); Jesús Guzmán (2006–present)

In-universe information
- Species: Humanoid Grasshopper
- Gender: Male
- Occupation: Superhero
- Nationality: Mexican

"Chapulín Colorado" translates literally in English as "The Red Grasshopper" or "The Cherry Cricket" (the word chapulín is of Nahuatl origin and applies to a Mexican species of grasshopper, while colorado means "red"). The show embodies many aspects of Mexican culture while making a critique on the unrealistic image of superheroes. In each episode, people recognized El Chapulín Colorado wherever he appeared (one episode took place on the planet Venus), believing him to be a great superhero. Recognition caused him to boast, only to stumble and fall right away, proving himself to be puny and timid, and disappointing his fans. Despite this, Chapulín tried his best to help, and all his adventures ended well (though sometimes by sheer good luck or outside help).

In Chapulín's universe, Chapulín is summoned to his "victims" when they are involved in a tough predicament or a challenging situation (whereas other superhero film/show were the hero is summoned to save someone from a life-threatening situation or an emergency). Such examples of this include:

- A mad scientist whose co-workers refused to cooperate with him on an experiment.
- A woman who is quite annoyed about her uncle playing pranks towards her and her husband.
- A woman who refuses to be married to a man that was set up by her uncle.

Parodying Superman's "Faster than a speeding bullet, more powerful than a locomotive" introduction, El Chapulín Colorado was introduced as follows in the show's opening, reinforcing the idea of a barely powered hero:

Más ágil que una tortuga, más fuerte que un ratón, más noble que una lechuga, su escudo es un corazón... ¡Es el Chapulín Colorado!
(More agile than a turtle, stronger than a mouse, nobler than lettuce, his shield is a heart... He's El Chapulín Colorado)
Más veloz que una montaña, más ágil que un refrigerador, más astuto que un aguacate, ¿y quién es?, Es… ¿Una paleta helada, ¿Un clavel?, ¿Un cuaderno cuadriculado?, ¡No!, Es… ¡El Chapulín Colorado!
(Faster than a mountain, more agile than a refrigerator, smarter than an avocado, and who is he?, He's… A popsicle?, A carnation?, A graph paper notebook?, No!, He's… El Chapulín Colorado!)

== Recurrent characters besides the protagonist ==
=== Heroes ===
- Súper Sam (Super Sam): (1973–1978; 1981) Played by Ramón Valdés. He is a superhero that hails from somewhere in the United States (most probably its southernmost regions) whose appearance is very similar to that of Uncle Sam (including the famous top hat with the colors of the U.S.), but his suit is very similar to Superman's. Half of the things Súper Sam says are in English, considering his inadequate skills with Spanish (he is known for having to carry an English-Spanish dictionary in his pocket whenever he needs to save someone in Mexico). Súper Sam's primary weapon is a bag full of dollars that he says were "few, but very powerful"; it is usually used to beat on the head of the wrongdoers or Chapulín, as both don't get along very well. Every time he uses his weapon, the ringing of a cash register chimes in the show's audio. His catchphrase is "Time is money, oh yeah!" and when present, most people say that "they don't want imported superheroes", much to Súper Sam's annoyance. According to Florinda Meza's character, Super Sam is "just like Chapulín, but with a bank account."

=== Villains ===
==== The Mob ====
- Tripaseca (in Portuguese as Tripa Seca; or in English as Dry-Gut): (1975–1979) Played by Ramón Valdés. He is one of the most frequently recurring villains on the show. He is an extremely dangerous gangster who is part of a mafia gang composed of Cuajináis, Chory, Botija and Minina. He is considered the worst archenemy of Chapulín, always scheming along with the rest of his gang to kill the hero to commit all the robberies he wants. In an episode in which he pretends to be dead to fool the local police force, Chapulín states that he had known Tripaseca since the two of them were children.
- Cuajináis (in Portuguese as Quase Nada, Chinesinho, Tonhão, Fura-Tripa or Gorila; or in English as Almost-Nothing): (1973–1978) Played by Carlos Villagrán. He is a deadly gangster characterized by the huge scar on his right cheek. Although he is an ally of Tripaseca, sometimes he attempts to score certain crimes on his own.
- El Chori (in Portuguese as Nenê, Johnny or Chori; or in English as Chory): (1973–1992) Played by Rubén Aguirre. He is a very vicious mobster characterized by his high stature and coldness. El Shory often gives much trouble to Chapulín in combat because of his superior strength and endurance. In some chapters, this character is nicknamed "El Nene (The Kid)". His name has double meaning; it is the Spanish abbreviation of the word "chorizo", and is also based on the English word shorty, a sarcastic reference on Rubén Aguirre's height of 1.96 metres (6 ft 5 in).
- Minina (in Portuguese as Celina; or in English as Pussycat): (1975-1979) Played by Florinda Meza. A woman who accompanies the mafia in their schemes and is characterized by constant smoking and her low intellectual capacity.
- Pocas Trancas (in Portuguese as Poucas Trancas; or in English as Few-Lock): Played by Rubén Aguirre. He is a madman who escaped from the asylum. People believe that Pocas Trancas was deaf, but a detective clarified that he couldn't speak because he didn't wash his tongue and that he couldn't listen because he didn't wash his ears. What he lacked in intelligence he made up for in raw strength, according to the same detective. Súper Sam and Chapulín usually have to team up to fight him.

==== The Gunmen ====
- Matafácil (in Portuguese as Mata-Fácil; or in English as Easykill or Easy Kill): (1972) Played by José Luiz Fernández. Making his first and only appearance in El Matafácil, he is a terrible and extremely violent bandit, who made the entire town run away when he went to the village. Only Ramón Valdez's character (a simple cowboy) decided to face the bandit, with the help of El Chapulín Colorado. After a huge fight and losing his wig, Matafácil was defeated, breaking the wall when he was thrown.
- El Pistolero Veloz (in Portuguese as Pistoleiro Veloz; or in English as The Speedy Gunman): (1973) Played by Ramón Valdés. He is a villain, gunman and robber who claims to be the fastest triggerman in the entire Old West, and had his only appearance in the episode El pistolero veloz (in Portuguese as O Pistoleiro da Marreta Biônica; or in English as The Gunman with the Bionic Sledgehammer).
- Rascabuches (in Portuguese as Racha Cuca; or in English as Tear-Maw): (1973-1979; 1981) Played by Ramón Valdés. He is a fiery gunslinger whose mere presence makes all the inhabitants of any village flee in great terror. He faced Chapulín many times and was always defeated by him (although once he was trapped by a giant mousetrap that had a bag of money as bait). The Rascabuches has a young daughter named Rosa.
- Matonsísimo Kid (The Superkiller Kid): (1975-1981) Played by Carlos Villagrán or Rubén Aguirre. A very dangerous gunman who constantly plagues small towns of the old American West, he is an ally of Rascabuches and Rosa la Rumorosa. Although claimed to be the fastest gunman of the Old West, Chapulín always managed to overcome him.
- Rosa la Rumorosa (in Portuguese as Rosa, a Rumorosa; or in English as Rose the Rumor Girl): (1973-1981) Played by Florinda Meza. She is the only daughter of Rascabuches, one of the most feared gunmen of the Old West. Despite being an accomplice to her father, she sometimes laments the fact that no one proposes marriage to her because of the notoriety of her father.
- Buffalo Bill (or in Portuguese as Búfalo Bill): (1976) Played by Ramón Valdés. Making his first and only appearance in A Buffalo Bill le decían búfalo porque era bastante animal. Lo del apellido sí es mera coincidencia, he is a very dangerous hunter from the Old West who is hired by the army to kill buffalo and Indians. Afterwards, he is forced to face Chapulín, knowing that the latter was forced to defend the Indians from his terrible slaughter.

==== Extraterrestrials ====
- Bebé júpiteriano (in Portuguese as Bebê Jupteriano; or in English as Jupiterian Baby): (1974, 1977, 1982) Played by Arturo García Tenorio in the 1974 and 1982 versions, or by Carlos Villagrán in the 1977 version. He is an extraterrestrial baby sent to Earth in an alien spaceship where he appeared small, but then grew and grew until he became giant. Then, El Chapulín Colorado tried to fight the baby, but the child hit him. After that, the hero discovered that it was just a dream, and that the spaceship was actually a toy.

==== The Pirates ====
- Alma Negra (in English as Black Soul): (1975-1978; 1981) Played by Ramón Valdés. He is the captain of the pirates, and as he said, the chief of all the pirates of the seven seas. Captain Alma Negra is quite evil and cruel, but sometimes a little clumsy as well (once being hurt with his own dagger while trying to intimidate el Chapulín Colorado). He is characterized by his malevolent and evil laughter and his tendency to endanger the life of his own crew and of Chapulín or any girl that doesn't want to marry him. According to himself, he killed the Dead Sea and therefore there are no longer seven seas, only six. At some point, he died but his ghost continued to curse the seas.
- El Matalote (in Portuguese as Matadouro; or in English as Slaughter): (1975-1978) Played by Rubén Aguirre. He is Alma Negra's right-hand man, the tallest of the pirates, and surely the most cruel after Alma Negra. El Matalote is known for being quite strong and ruthless.
- Sabandija (in Portuguese as Lagartixa; or in English as Gecko/Louse): (1975-1978) Played by Carlos Villagrán. He is a very clumsy pirate that has a left wooden leg and a right glass eye, the former lost in one of the many battles fought under Alma Negra's command and the latter lost after peeking through a keyhole. He and Panza Loca are the only ones in the crew who rebel against the master pirate alongside Chapulín.
- Panza Loca (in Portuguese as Pança Louca; or in English as Crazy Belly): Played by Édgar Vivar. He is the fattest of the pirates, is very obese has a little intimidating voice and apparently was not a very good pirate. He is as cowardly as Sabandija and often suffers through life-threatening situations because of the whims of Captain Alma Negra.
- Ajonjolí (in Portuguese as Lagoa Seca; or in English as Dry Lagoon): (1975) Played by Horacio Gómez Bolaños. He is a pirate who is quite sincere with his friends and takes the place of Panza Loca by force of Alma Negra, while this other pirate went to buy cigarettes (according to this first pirate). He made his first and only appearance in the second part of Los antiguos piratas del Caribe sólo de vez en cuando desviaban a Cuba.
- Flor Marina (in English as Marina Flower): (1975-1978; 1982) Played by Florinda Meza. She is the pirate tavern keeper on Alma Negra's ship, and is one of the members who rebel against the master pirate alongside Chapulín. On another occasion, she was imprisoned for refusing to marry Alma Negra.

==== Japanese Dome ====
- Sugatito Orinawa (in Portuguese as Kassamba Urinawa): (1971, 1973, 1976, 1980, 1988) Played by Ramón Valdés in the 1971, 1973 and 1976 versions, by Édgar Vivar in the 1980 version, or by Rubén Aguirre in the 1988 version. He is the geisha's father who forces her to marry a karateka (or the inspector of light in the 1976 version).
- Silbato Yamazaki (in Portuguese as Simpato Amasaki; or in Japanese as 山崎シンパト, Yamazaki Shinpato): (1971, 1973, 1976, 1980, 1988) Played by Rubén Aguirre in 1971, 1976 and 1980 versions, and by Édgar Vivar in the 1973 and 1988 versions. He is a great karateka who once fought with El Chapúlín Colorado so that the geisha could get out of her marriage with that same karateka (or the inspector of light in the 1976 version).

==== Other villains ====
- Conde "Vittorio" Terranova (in English as Count "Vittorio" Terranova or Count Terranova): (1972, 1977, 1982, 1986) Played by David Povall in the 1972 version, by Rubén Aguirre in the 1977, 1982 and 1986 versions, and by Ramón Valdés in the 1978 version. He is a very greedy, swindling count who does everything he can to deceive wealthy families in order to take possession of their valuable objects. In the 1972 version, the count was supposed to marry Ramón Valdez's daughter (María Antonieta de las Nieves), but suspicious of the Count's honesty, Ramón called Chapulín Colorado, who proved that the Count was a fraud. In the 1977 version, Chapulín Colorado is summoned to help a couple so that her father accepts their relationship, since he suspects that his daughter's boyfriend, Count Terranova, only wants her for his money. And to do so, he decides to tell them the story of the famous pianist Frederic Chopin.
- Doctor Panchostein (also known as Dr. Panchostein; in Portuguese as Doutor Lobstein or Dr. Lobstein, or in English as Doctor Lobstein): (1974) Played by Ramón Valdés in the 1971 version, by Carlos Villagrán in the 1974 and 1977 versions, and by Édgar Vivar in the 1990 version. In these same versions, he is the cousin of Dr. Frankenstein, who was born in Pirapora (according to his Brazilian dub). An evil genius, Panchostein created a creature that needed blood to stay alive. In his laboratory hidden in the cemetery, Panchostein kept the creature. He kidnapped a peasant woman and decided to take her blood to feed his creature, who turned against him. Chapulín Colorado started a fight against the monster, who succumbed because he had not fed on blood. After this fight, Panchostein was never seen again.
- Bruja Baratuja (in Portuguese as Bruxa Baratuxa; or in English as Baratuxa Witch): (1971, 1976) Played by María Antonieta de las Nieves in the 1971 and 1976 versions. She is an evil witch who appears in these versions of Cuento de brujas, and lives in the middle of the forest, along with her son, who is an ogre (played by Carlos Villagrán). She wanted to turn a peasant woman into a soccer referee, that is, to make her blind, if she did not let her son marry her. The peasant woman-with-a-noble-heart-who-goes-to-the-forest-every-day-to-collect-firewood did not accept, and the witch turned her into a tree. It's up to Chapulín to face them, but he has difficulty pronouncing the cabalistic word (Parangaricutirimícuaro).
- La Reina (also known as Reina, Reina Malvada or Madrastra Malvada; in Portuguese as Rainha, Rainha Má or Madrasta Má on English as Evil Queen or Evil Stepmother): (1978) Played by María Antonieta de las Nieves. She made her first and only appearance as the main antagonist of the three-part saga Blancanieves y los siete Churi Churín Fun Flais, which is based on the fairy tale Snow White. In it, she has a magic mirror, which every day asks who is the fairest of them all. But one day, after discovering that Snow White is the fairest of them all, the queen became furious and hired a huntsman to kill her. After the huntsman failed, she became even more furious and decided to kill her herself, in the form of an evil witch (disguised as a poor peasant woman) and using a poisoned apple. After this barbarity, the witch was informed by her magic mirror that a man dressed in red (who is Chapulín Colorado himself) will be the only one to undo this spell on Snow White, in addition to this same witch undergoing a strange and unexpected transformation into a beautiful woman.
- Espejo mágico (in Portuguese as Espelho mágico or Espelho Mágico; or in English as Magic Mirror or Magical Mirror): (1978) Played by Ramón Valdés. As the name suggests, he is a magic mirror that always tells the truth to the Evil Queen and shows the possible events that happen in the world, making his first and only appearance as a minor antagonist of the three-part saga Blancanieves y los siete Churi Churín Fun Flais. He is also known for taking breaks for commercials for beer, cigarettes and the "Bosque Lobo Feroz" financial condominium by two merchants (played by Rubén Aguirre and Roberto Gómez Bolaños). After the queen (in the form of a witch) poisons Snow White with a poisoned apple, this same magic mirror informs her that a man dressed in red (who is Chapulín Colorado himself) would be the only one to undo the spell on the poor cursed princess, in addition to that this same witch would undergo a strange and unexpected transformation into a beautiful woman.

=== Other recurring characters ===
- Profesor Inventillo (in Portuguese as Professor Inventivo, Professor Imbecilo or Professor Betuzo; in English as Professor Invention or Professor Inventor): (1974-1977; 1980; 1982-1994) Played by Ramón Valdés or Raul "Chato" Padilla. He is a scientist with extensive knowledge of chemistry, physics, mechanics, biology, etc., and works in both laboratories and archeology fields. He is also known for complaining a lot about El Chapulín Colorado, due to the latter's clumsy actions.
- Doctor Chapatín (in English as Doctor Chapatin or Dr. Chapatin): (1970-1995) Played by Roberto Gómez Bolaños. He is a very elderly doctor who strongly hates being bothered and called "old man", and always carries a paper bag. He also appears in a few episodes of this same series, in addition to his nurse, including De médico, Chapulín y loco todos tenemos un poco.
- Enfermera del Dr. Chapatín (in English as Doctor Chapatin's nurse): (1970-1972; 1973-1995) Played by María Antonieta de las Nieves or Florinda Meza. As the name suggests, she is Doctor Chapatín's nurse who works at his hospital. She is sometimes a bit silly, but Doctor Chapatín always owes her her due. She also appears in a few episodes of the same series, including De médico, Chapulín y loco todos tenemos un poco.
- El Chavo del Ocho: (1976-1978) Played by Roberto Gómez Bolaños. He is a very poor, orphaned eight-year-old boy who lives in the apartment number 8 of the neighborhood and hides inside a wooden barrel, and has his own sitcom series. He also has Chapulín Colorado as his favorite hero, and has made few appearances in the episodes of this sitcom series featuring the same hero, including the 1976 version Todo queda en familia.
- Quico: (1976-1978) Played by Carlos Villagrán. He is a boy of about 9 years old who wears a red, yellow and blue cap, has large cheekbones on his face and lives in a neighborhood, in the apartment number 14 with his mother Doña Florinda, and is also a main character in the sitcom series El Chavo del Ocho. He is also a fan of Chapulín Colorado, and has made few appearances in the episodes of this sitcom series of the same hero, including in the 1976 version Todo queda en familia.
- La Chilindrina: (1976-1978) Played by María Antonieta de las Nieves. She is a girl of about 8 years old who wears glasses, has freckles on her face, wears two pigtails in her hair and lives in a neighborhood, in the apartment number 72 with her father Don Ramón, and is also a main character in the sitcom series El Chavo del Ocho. She is also a fan of Chapulín Colorado, and has made a few appearances in the episodes of this sitcom series about the same hero, including in the 1976 version Todo queda en familia.
- Don Ramón: (1976-1978) Played by Ramón Valdés. He is an unemployed widower who is Doña Nieves' grandson and lives in the apartment number 72 along with his daughter Chilindrina in Chavo's neighborhood, owned by Señor Barriga, and is also a main character in the sitcom series El Chavo del Ocho. He is also a fan of Chapulín Colorado, and has made few appearances in the episodes of this sitcom series of the same hero, including in the 1976 version Todo queda en familia.
- Doña Florinda: (1976-1978) Played by Florinda Meza. She is an irritated and bad tempered woman who is Quico's mother and Profesor Jirafales' love interest who is known for wearing curlers on her head and cares too much about the things she loves most and lives in a neighborhood, in the apartment number 14 with her son Quico, being also a main character in the sitcom series El Chavo del Ocho. She also made a few appearances in the episodes of this sitcom series about Chapulín Colorado, including in the 1976 version Todo queda en familia.
- Profesor Jirafales: (1978) Played by Rubén Aguirre. He is Doña Florinda's love interest and the teacher in the neighborhood where El Chavo and the other children there study, being also a main character in the sitcom series El Chavo del Ocho. He is also known for being called unpleasant nicknames by children, including Maestro Longaniza (in Portuguese as Mestre Linguiça; or in English as Professor Sausage). In the sitcom series El Chapulín Colorado, he made his first and only appearance in the three-part saga Blancanieves y los siete Churi Churín Fun Flais.
- Blanca Nieves (also known as Blancanieves; in Portuguese as Branca de Neve; or in English as Snow White#Snow White): (1978) Played by Florinda Meza. She made her first and only appearance as the main protagonist of the three-part saga Blancanieves y los siete Churi Churín Fun Flais. In this, she is considered the most beautiful woman of all, according to the evil queen's magic mirror, who became furious due to this. The hunter, being hired by the queen to kill her, does not have the courage to do so and sends her to flee to the forest. Arriving there, Snow White sees a house, which belongs to the seven dwarfs. When they return from their jewel mine, they see this same princess, who asks to live there while protecting herself from the evil queen. So, they accept and have fun together for a long time. After a long time, the evil queen realized through her magic mirror that Snow White was still alive and became furious, turning into a witch. So, after the seven dwarfs left to mine in their jewel mine, this same princess decided to stay in their house to take care of everything. And so, she received a visit from a poor peasant woman who offered her a poisoned apple, but in fact, it was the witch in disguise. After biting into the apple, she fainted on the floor, and when the seven dwarfs returned, they were quite surprised and sad, thinking that she had died. And according to the magic mirror, the only hope of removing the spell from Snow White is Chapulín Colorado himself, who was called by the seven dwarfs and unexpectedly played the role of Prince Charming, putting his bionic mallet in her mouth to try to undo the spell. So, Snow White woke up, came out of the spell and was quite delighted that the bionic mallet had saved her from it, to the surprise of Chapulín and the seven dwarves.
- Chato Resto (also known and simply as Chato): (1977) Played by Horacio Gómez Bolaños. Making his first and only appearance in the episode Un Chapulín en Acapulco, he is a famous and acclaimed actor who was supposed to play Chapulín Colorado in the film of the same name, filmed in Acapulco, Guerrero. Despite being overweight, Chato started filming. After many interruptions from a fan and Seu Trocadeiro, Chato decided to leave the filming, forcing the director to have the real Chapulín play himself in the film. His name is a satire on Charlton Heston.
- Sophia Coren (also known and simply as Sophia): (1977) Played by Florinda Meza. Making her first and only appearance in the episode Un Chapulín en Acapulco, she is a very famous actress who was cast to play the young lady in the Chapulín Colorado movie, which was being filmed in Acapulco. Alongside actor Chato Resto, Sophia was to star in the film. Irritated by the many interruptions, Resto left the filming. Sophia continued, this time filming alongside the real Chapulín. Her name is a satire on Sophia Loren.
- Señor Tocadillo (in Portuguese as Seu Trocadeiro or Homem Nuclear; or in English as Mr. Changer or the Nuclear Man): (1977) Played by Carlos Villagrán. Making his first and only appearance in the episode Un Chapulín en Acapulco, he is a madman who believes he is a superhero, the Nuclear Man. After escaping from the asylum, Tocadillo began to interrupt the filming of El Chapulín Colorado movie, thinking that real crimes were taking place. The reputation of a madman in the area made everyone scared and confused. Tocadillo tried to attack the actress Sophia Coren, but was defeated by Chapulín.
- Productor (in Portuguese as Produtor; or in English as Producer): (1977) Played by Jorge Gutiérrez Zamora. Making his first and only appearance in the episode Un Chapulín en Acapulco, he is the producer of the Chapulín Colorado film in Acapulco, as his name suggests.

=== 2015 animated series only ===
==== Allies ====
- Dulce Inventillo: Voiced by Julieta Rivera, she is Professor Inventillo's granddaughter, and is in love with Chapulín, but also with Mamerto Chamorro, Rudy Culebro's brother. But she was never mentioned in the original series.
- Comandante Chacota (or in English as Commander Chacota): Voiced by Enrique Horiuchi, he is the city's police commander and one of Chapulín's good friends.
- Clementina: Voiced by Queta Leonel, she is a lady who has her own cafeteria, always accompanied by Sargento Montoya.
- Sargento Montoya (or in English as Sergeant Montoya): Voiced by Miguel Ángel Ghigliazza, he is the police sergeant and is one of Chapulín's good friends, always being with Clementina in her cafeteria. He also has a certain resemblance to the other sergeant, who is Sergeant Refugio Pazguato, from the sitcom series Los Caquitos.
- Periquita Mozcorra (or in English as Mozcorra Parakeet): Voiced by Erica Edwards, she is a reporter for a television network. She is madly obsessed with Chapulín. This character did not appear in the original version.
- Riccadonna Mantecosa: Voiced by Sofía Huerta, she is an opera singer who only appears in the episode Noche de ópera (Opera Night).
- Norbertito Chambón: Voiced by Gerardo Alonso, he is a man who suffers an accident and ends up becoming almost invisible, making his first and only appearance in El hombre casi invisible (The Almost Invisible Man).
- Sr. Pip (or in English as Mr. Pip): Voiced by Tommy Rojas, he is a friendly alien who was once lost on Earth and became one of Chapulín Colorado's friends, making his first and only appearance in El retorno del Sr. Pip (The Return of Mr. Pip). In the same episode, in his past, after the destruction of his planet Pipian, Sr. Pip traveled through the galaxy with other members of his race to Deimos, a moon of Mars, but his ship went off course and crashed on Earth. He was adopted by the farmer Gorgonio Tinoco and baptized as Sr. Pip by the media, also revealing that this same alien likes corn. However, Sr. Pip was kidnapped by foreign scientists and taken to a laboratory to perform experiments. Chapulín Colorado intervened, rescued him and, with the help of Professor Inventillo, returned him to his species.
- Willy, Billi, Lili, Pili, Vinny y Sharon (or in English as Willy, Billi, Lili, Pili, Vinny and Sharon): Voiced by Manuel Pérez, Daniel Muñoz, Betzabé Jara, Romina Marroquín, Xavier Sol, and Angélica Villa, they are a group of cheerleaders (three girls and three boys) who decided to spend their holidays in an icy forest, making their first and only appearance in the episode of the same name.
- Luna de Lobos (or in English as Moon of Wolves or Princess Moon of Wolves): Voiced by Angélica Villa, she is a friendly, yet sensitive apache princess who lives in a village with her father Perro Loco. She is also known for caring a lot about her life, her boyfriend Perro Loco and her friend Chapulín Colorado, making her first and only appearance in Amor apache (Apache Love).
- Perro Loco (or in English as Mad Dog): Voiced by Xavier Sol, he is the leader of his own apache village and the father of Princess Luna de Lobos. He is also known for caring so much about his daughter and being suspicious of the things others do, making his first and only appearance in Amor apache (Apache Love).
- Oso Parado de Manos (or in English as Handstand Bear): Voiced by Alfonso Obregón, he is a brave and friendly, yet sensitive apache warrior who cares too much about his life, his girlfriend Luna de Lobos and his friend Chapulín Colorado, making his first and only appearance in Amor apache (Apache Love).

==== Villains ====
- Rudy Cullebro: Voiced by Gerardo Alonso, he is an evil scientist. In his first appearance, which was in the episode El gigantesco Lagartossaurio (The Gigantic Lizardosaurus), he built a lizardosaurus to fulfill his demands, which were lunch and a drink. He is one of the regular villains of the animated series.
- Doctor Moquillo: Voiced by Gerardo Alonso, he is an evil mad scientist with a short nose, always accompanied by his clumsy assistant, Pirulino. He seeks a way to discredit Chapulín and take his place as a superhero, who is called Baratona Verde (also known as Cucarachón Verde, or in English as Green Cockroach) and uses phrases and weapons similar to Chapulín. This character did not appear in the original version.
- Mascavidrio: Voiced by Gerardo Alonso, he is a gangster of Cuban origin, whose identity is completely obscure.
- Tumba-Tumbas (also known as Tumba Tumbas, or in English as Tomb-Tombs or Tomb Tombs): Voiced by Miguel Ángel Ghigliazza, he is an undead thief who robs cemeteries, making his first and only appearance in ¿Aquí es donde vive el muerto? (Is This Where the Dead Man Lives?).

== Seasons ==
Season	Episodes	First aired	Last aired
1	35	February 28, 1973	December 28, 1973
2	36	January 4, 1974	December 14, 1974
3	31	January 2, 1975	November 6, 1975
4	39	January 1, 1976	December 25, 1976
5	43	January 1, 1977	December 14, 1977
6	40	March 8, 1978	December 13, 1978
7	24	February 7, 1979	September 26, 1979

== Production ==
=== Concept ===
According to Chespirito, the difference between Chapulín and standard heroes:

They are not heroes. El Chapulín Colorado is a hero, and I'm being serious. Heroism does not consist in being fearless, but in overcoming fear. Those heroes are not afraid, Batman, Superman, they are all powerful, they cannot be afraid. El Chapulín Colorado is terrified. He is clumsy, weak, foolish, etc., and aware of these deficiencies, he faces the problem, he is a hero, and loses; another characteristic of heroes is that they lose many times, their ideas succeed later.

=== Pioneer in visual effects ===
With Chapulín, Chespirito and along his production team made extensive use of the chroma key device and bluescreen to produce visual effects which made the adventures of this superhero more interesting. Though somewhat unrefined by modern standards, the show achieved surprising effects like floating in the air or flying, performing impossible acrobatics, fighting against Martians, strange creatures, witches and various monsters, and, most often, to get the physical reduction effect thanks to his famous "pastillas de chiquitolina", which Chapulín frequently used to pass under doors, reach dangerous areas without attracting attention, or solve problems.

This innovation, which was already known in Mexican television but not widely used, gave Chapulín the distinction of being virtually the only adventure-comedy broadcast in Mexico.

=== Music ===
Similarly to El Chavo del Ocho, the production music of El Chapulín Colorado typically derives from feature films or other media. The opening intro, for instance, combines excerpts of "The Red Sea" from The Ten Commandments (1956), as well as "Finale" from Tom Sawyer (1973). In the end credits for most episodes between 1975 and 1979, "Baroque Hoedown" by Jean Jacques Perrey (who also composed "The Elephant Never Forgets" used in El Chavo) can be heard. However, the two versions of the song used in the credits actually originate from the 1973 and 1977 soundtrack releases of Disney's Main Street Electrical Parade, where Baroque Hoedown was rearranged twice for exclusive use on the famous Disney parade.

== Related media ==
=== Animated series ===
==== El Chapulín Colorado ====
An animated series based on the show premiered in April 2015, made by Ánima Estudios.

==== El Chapulín y los Colorado ====
In May 2024, it has been reported that a new animated series based on the show, originally titled Los Colorado, was in development. The series centers on El Chapulín Colorado as he struggles with both his crimefighting activities and his duties as husband and father.

The show premiered on January 1, 2026 on HBO Max and Cartoon Network.

Developed by Rodolfo and Gabriel Riva Palacio, and executive produced by Roberto Gómez Fernández, the series was produced by Grupo Chespirito, Telefilms, and TH3 Media Group alongside Huevocartoon.

=== Animated film ===
In May 2017, Roberto Gómez Fernández revealed that an animated film adaptation of El Chapulín Colorado is in development. On October 6, 2019, it was reported that Gómez Fernández had begun working on the script. Later that month, Gómez Fernández revealed that production on the film has begun. He also said that the film will take place in a shared universe featuring characters created by Chespirito.

=== Live-action film ===
In December 2020, Gómez Fernández revealed that a live-action film based on the character is being produced in parallel to the animated film. The idea for a live-action feature film was conceived during development on the animated film. Although no actor has been cast on the title role, Gómez Fernández acknowledged that the studio has certain actors in consideration.

=== Comics ===
El Chapulín Colorado comics were sold in Mexico during the program's broadcasting years from 1974 until 1982. These comics have also been seen occasionally appearing in some episodes of El Chavo (where El Chapulín Colorado is considered a fictional character on the show) usually being read by the characters. The comics were sold weekly and sold an estimated total of more than 400 issues.

In the early 1990s with the high popularity of the products of the Chespirito characters in Brazil, two series of children's comics were made in partnership with the Editora Globo, with a new art style different from Mexican comics. These comics were Chaves & Chapolim (1990–1993) and Chapolim & Chaves (1991–1992), both comics features stories both with El Chavo del Ocho and El Chapulín Colorado.

In May 2017, along with the announcement of a film, Gómez Fernández revealed that a comic series based on the character is in development.

=== Video games ===
El Chapulín Colorado is also extremely popular in Brazil. The company, Tec Toy, responsible for distributing the Sega consoles in Brazil, published a video game for the Sega Master System called Chapolim x Drácula: Um duelo assustador (Chapulín vs. Dracula: A Frightening Duel). It was a localization of another existing SMS title, Ghost House, with the hero's graphics changed to Chapulín's.

To celebrate the 91st anniversary of Chespirito's birth date and the 50th anniversary of the character's creation, on February 21, 2020, the videogame FIFA 20 added a free DLC based on El Chapulín Colorado. The DLC specifically added a new yellow and red uniform based on the character for the Ultimate Team game mode, which includes the heart shield on the uniform's shirt.

On October 29, 2021, it was announced that El Chapulín Colorado would become a playable character in the popular video game Fortnite, becoming available to the public as of November 2, 2021. Additionally, there are two sets of 5 outfits made with common Fortnite characters wearing the Chapulín Colorado outfit.

On July 9, 2022, a skin based on El Chapulín Colorado was added to Epic Games' Fall Guys, which was available until July 13. Later that year on October 11, a Chapulín Colorado-themed vehicle and the character's imagery were added to sister game Rocket League, which were available until October 17.

== Reception ==
=== Popularity ===
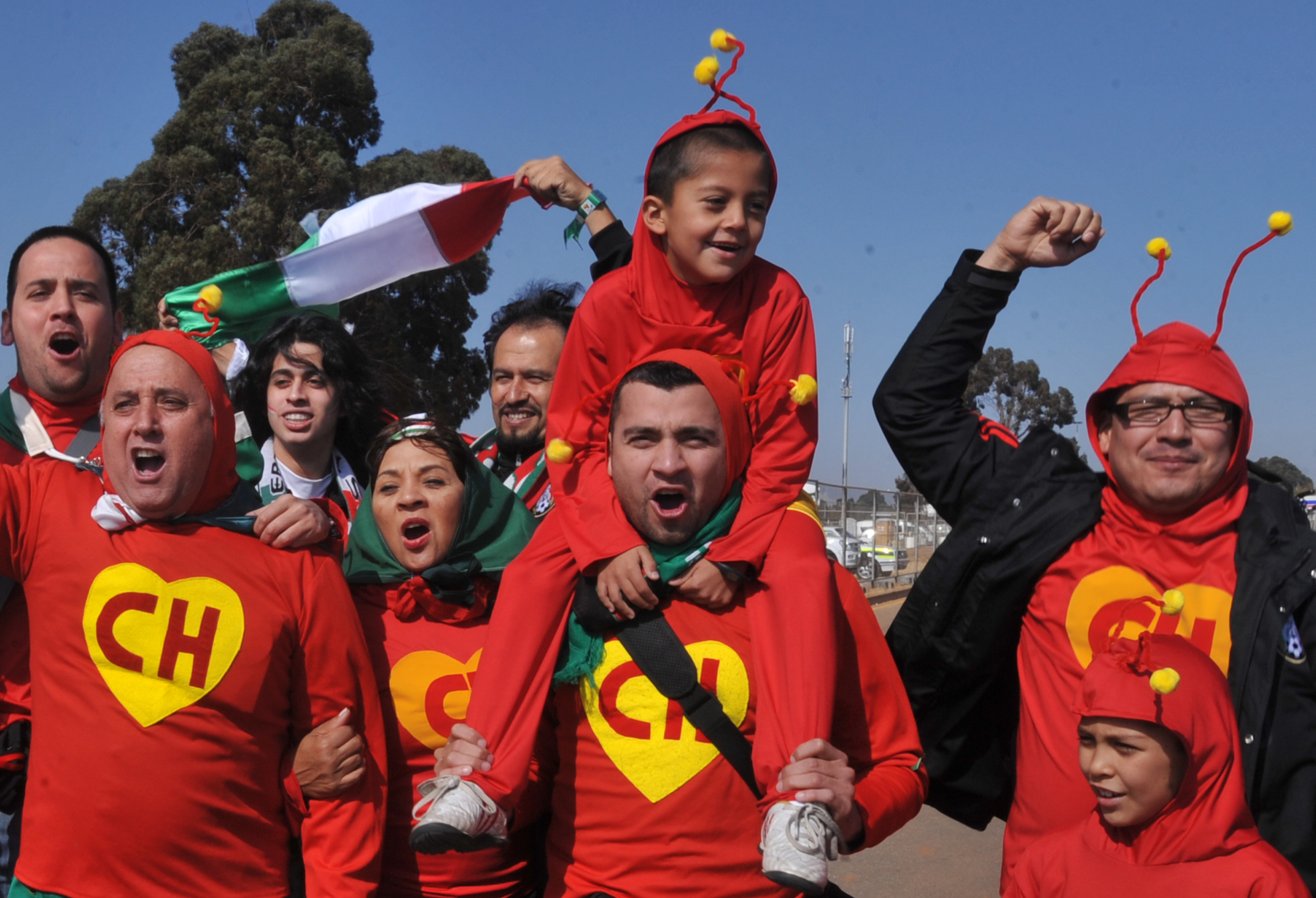
Mexico supporters at the 2010 FIFA World Cup. Chespirito's characters are widely known in Latin America and as a result, fans frequently dress as them to show affiliation with Mexico national football team.

Chapulín has enjoyed popularity all over Latin America, the United States, Spain, Portugal and many other countries, albeit somewhat less than its sister production of El Chavo del Ocho. Like El Chavo del Ocho, it is still shown in reruns in various countries. The cast of El Chapulín Colorado was the same as that of El Chavo del Ocho, although only actors Florinda Meza, Carlos Villagrán and Ramón Valdés were usually in every episode; however, the characters usually were different. Some of the regular (albeit infrequent) characters who appeared, usually Chapulín foes, were El Tripaseca (Ramón Valdés) and El Cuajinais' (Carlos Villagrán), a pair of Mafiosi who liked to make heists, as well as concurrent superhero Súper Sam (played by Ramón Valdés too; see below). One-off villains, mostly those played by RamónValdés, like Wild West outlaw El Rascabuche, are also fondly remembered by fans.

Shorter Chapulín adventures were preceded by a skit, usually featuring Chespirito's other characters, like Dr. Chapatín, a tactless, impatient old physician, or El Chómpiras, an incompetent thief in the skit called Los Caquitos, along with El Peterete, played by Ramón Valdés. Chompiras and his new partner in crime, El Botija, played by Édgar Vivar, came to dominate the later years of Chespirito, an hour-long showcase featuring all the characters of the show.

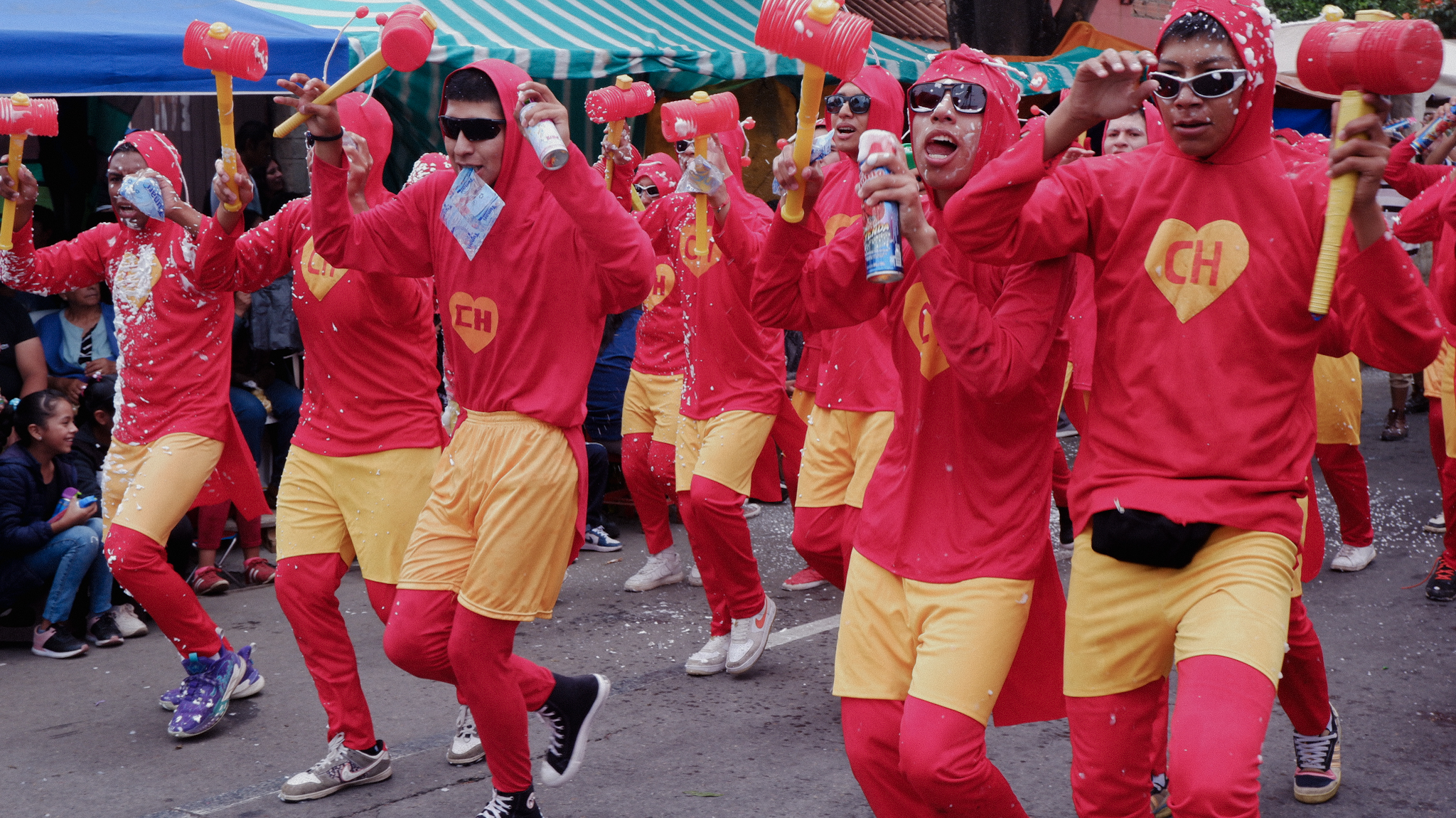
Bolivian people at a local carnival event

The physical diversity of Chespirito actors permitted the richness of characters in the adventures, each week a new one. El Chapulín Colorado was a hero of undetermined geographic and temporal location: his adventures could unfold in the American Old West, in ancient Japan, in haunted houses, in London, in the Swiss Alps, during the Spanish Inquisition, in pirate ships, in Nazi Germany (an episode in which Chespirito played a double role as Chapulín and as Adolf Hitler himself, in the style of Charles Chaplin's The Great Dictator) or outer space, and his enemies range from the mafians, pirates, ghosts, Yeti to Egyptian mummies, including his interaction, in some occasions, with literary characters such as, Romeo and Juliet ("Juleo y Rumieta", or literally "Juleo and Rumiet").

=== Legacy ===
The Simpsons creator Matt Groening has said that he created the Bumblebee Man character after watching El Chapulín Colorado in a motel on the United States–Mexico border.

The character made a cameo on Action Comics No. 820 (December 2004), published by DC Comics.

The Marvel Comics superheroine Red Locust, a member of the Champions, was created as an homage to El Chapulín Colorado.

On the manga and anime series One Punch Man, a superhero called "Smile Man" physically resembles El Chapulín Colorado, while also resembling classic Japanese character Anpanman. The character wears almost the same yellow and red suit as El Chapulín Colorado, using a big red and yellow hammer as well. However, there are a few noticeable differences, such as the lack of antennae on the head, a big smile face instead of a heart shield on his chest (like Anpanman) and the use of a mask. While it is yet to be confirmed if the character is a parody or a tribute of El Chapulín Colorado, several news websites (especially from Latin America) noticed the physical similarities. The official Spanish Twitter account of the series even acknowledged the similarities, using one of El Chapulín's quotes along a screenshot showing Smile Man.

El Chapulín Colorado appears in one of the episodes of season 5 of Monica Toy (animated spin-off of Monica and Friends).

The DC film Blue Beetle (2023) features an homage to El Chapulín Colorado. Director Ángel Manuel Soto and writer Gareth Dunnet-Alcocer incorporated the homage due to having watched the original series while growing up.

=== Fine art ===
El Chapulín Colorado was one of the subjects incorporated by photographer Dulce Pinzon in her photographic series titled "The Real Stories of the Superheroes". In this series, Pinzon dressed mostly Mexican immigrants as various superheroes, but performing their normal, daily work in construction, childcare, waitressing, window cleaning, etc., and then photographed them. The series included superheroes such as Batman, Superman, and Spider-Man, as well as El Chapulín Colorado. This photographic series was declared as part of the National Legacy of Mexico in 2020.
