= Perrey and Kingsley =

Electronic music duo

- Genre: Electronic
- Instruments: Ondioline; Moog
- Years active: 1965–1967
- Labels: Vanguard (1966-2007); Welk Music Group (2012–2015); Craft Recordings (2015–present)

Perrey and Kingsley (known also as "Perrey & Kingsley" or "Perrey-Kingsley") was an electronic music duo made up of French composer Jean-Jacques Perrey and German-American composer Gershon Kingsley. The duo lasted from 1965 to 1967 and both are considered pioneers of electronic music. The duo recorded for Vanguard Records and released two studio albums: The In Sound From Way Out! and Kaleidoscopic Vibrations. They also were among the first musicians to incorporate the Moog synthesizer, prior to the successful 1968 release Switched-On Bach by Wendy Carlos.

== History ==
=== Background ===
Gershon Kingsley had been a German-American Vanguard Records arranger since 1964. He fled Nazi Germany to reach then Mandatory Palestine a few days before Kristallnacht in 1938. After World War II he came to Los Angeles in 1946, where he adopted the pseudonym "Gershon" in tribute to the son of Moses, studied at the Conservatory of Music, and worked on Broadway productions.

Jean-Jacques Perrey was a French accordion player and medical student who abandoned his studies after meeting Georges Jenny, the inventor of the Ondioline, who hired Perrey as a salesman in the late 1950s. At the Studio of Contemporary Music Research in France, Perrey met Pierre Schaeffer, who had pioneered the avant-garde sound art form known as musique concrète. Thereafter, Perrey began to experiment with tape manipulation.

Perrey and Kingsley met in 1964 at the Carroll Music Service led by Carroll Bratman in New York City.

=== 1964–1966: The In Sound From Way Out! ===
Perrey signed a contract with Vanguard Records and their first recording for the label was "The Little Man From Mars" which was included on the 1966 album The In Sound From Way Out!.

The two spent 275 hours producing and recording the album, Perrey also played Ondioline, provided musique concrète "rhythmic patterns", and mixed his tape loops and "inventive melodies" with Kingsley's arrangements and instrumentation. Some tracks from this album were adaptations of classical music pieces: "Swan's Splashdown" is a version of Danse des petits cygnes from Pyotr Tchaikovsky's Swan Lake ballet and "Countdown At 6" is a version of Dance of the Hours by Ponchielli.

The "baby cooing" sound clip used in "Countdown At 6" was extracted from Authentic Sound Effects Volume 8 (1964, part of a Carroll Music series); later that same sound would be used by Aaliyah in her 1998 single "Are You That Somebody?" "Barnyard In Orbit" composed by Perrey and Sam Fiedel for the library album Musique Electronique du Cosmos (1962) was reworked for the album. The artwork was designed by American painter Jules Halfant.

The In Sound From Way Out! was released on the Vanguard label in 1966. "Visa To The Stars", co-written by Angelo Badalamenti (under the pseudonym "Andy Badale") was released as promotional single in March 1967 with "Spooks In Space" as B side.

On November 21, 1966, Perrey and Kingsley performed on the American game show I've Got a Secret. Perrey imitated four orchestral instruments with the Ondioline, and then played with Kingsley one of the album tracks ("Spooks In Space", an electronic version of Saint-Saëns's Danse macabre).

==== Critical reception ====
In his, Billboard stated that the "recording of electronic pop music created by Gershon Kingsley and Jean Jacques Perrey is so far out it may become in."

In AllMusic, Richie Unterberger wrote that "this early attempt to bring electronic music to the masses is commendable" and that "is cheesy enough to skirt the boundaries of kitsch, with a boxy, mechanical texture and a music-box-run-amok feel." He but added that, "There is a goofy charm to the mischievous placement of burps, gurgles, animal noises, and naive outer space-tinged themes", concluding the album material "would be far more at home on the soundtrack of a children's TV cartoon than a work of contemporary composition, this album is more of a curiosity than anything else."

The In Sound From Way Out! was chosen as one of the "ten basic space age pop albums" by The Space Age Pop Music Page.

=== 1967–1972: Kaleidoscopic Vibrations ===
For the second studio album Kaleidoscopic Vibrations: Electronic Pop Music From Way Out, the duo incorporated the Moog synthesizer, with added special effects. It was played together with the Ondioline and is the second to be sold. Kaleidoscopic Vibrations was released on Vanguard label in 1967. It is a mix between original tracks by Perrey and Kingsley like "The Savers" or "Fallout" and synthesized interpretations of "Umbrellas of Cherbourg", "Strangers In The Night", "Lover's Concerto", "Third Man Theme", Winchester Cathedral, Moon River, Mas que Nada and other pop songs from time.

"The Savers" was released as single on December 9, 1967, with "Pioneers Of The Stars" as the B side. An older version of "Pioners Of The Stars" co-written by Badalamenti was included in the 2017 compilation album Jean-Jacques Perrey et son Ondioline. Some outlets such as AllMusic or NTS Radio cited the influence that Joe Meek style had on Badalamenti's collaborations with the duo. In a retrospective review, Richie Unterberger from AllMusic commented that, "It was still largely devoted to kitschy electro treatments of standards". In late 1960s, it was reissued with a new artwork and new additional title, Spotlight on the Moog.

After the release of Kaleidoscopic Vibrations, the duet disbanded, and Jean-Jacques Perrey recorded two more studio albums with the Vanguard Records label: The Amazing New Electronic Pop Sound of Jean Jacques Perrey (1968) and Moog Indigo (1970). Gershon Kingsley released in 1969 the solo studio album Music to Moog By on Audio Fidelity Records label. It included the original version of Popcorn, which would later reach a great popularity and success with the version recorded by Hot Butter in 1972.

In later years, several compilation albums of his work were released. In 1975, compilation album The Essential Perrey & Kingsley was released, the following year it was described by Keyboard magazine as an "a fine novelty album: one tires of it after four or five cuts, but in the meantime one is treated to an almost bewildering variety of silly synthesizer sounds." In 2001, a triple CD entitled The Out Sound From Way In! was released, which compiles four Perrey albums, two as a duet and solo, plus seven remixes of Perrey and Kingsley's work, including two remixes from the Moog Indigo song, "E.V.A." by Fatboy Slim and five by Eurotrash.

== Discography ==
=== Studio albums ===
- 1966: The In Sound from Way Out! (Vanguard Records)
- 1967: Kaleidoscopic Vibrations: Electronic Pop Music From Way Out (Vanguard Records)

=== Compilation albums ===
- 1973: The Best Of The Moog (Vanguard Records)
- 1975: Incredible Synthesizer (Vanguard Records)
- 1975: The Essential Perrey & Kingsley (Vanguard Records)
- 2001: The Out Sound from Way In! The Complete Vanguard Recordings (Vanguard Records)
- 2007: Vanguard Visionaries: Perrey & Kingsley (Vanguard Records)
- 2012: The Electronic Pop Songs (Welk Music Group)
- 2012: Space Age Computer Music (Welk Music Group)

=== Singles ===
- 1966: Swan's Splashdown / Cosmic Ballad (Vanguard Records)
- 1967: Visa To The Stars / Spooks In Space (Vanguard Records)
- 1967: The Savers / Pioneers Of The Stars (Vanguard Records)

== Legacy and influence ==
Some tracks by Perrey and Kingsley were licensed for radio and television commercials and programs:

- The final track from The In Sound From Way Out!, "Visa To The Stars" was used in a commercial for the Esso (Standard Oil of New Jersey) oil company.
- In 1968, "The Savers", from Kaleidoscopic Vibrations, won a Clio Award when it was used as the soundtrack for a No-Cal diet soft drink commercial;
- Later, the same track would be used as the opening theme for the American television game show The Joker's Wild from 1972 to 1975.
- Some tracks from The In Sound From Way Out! were used on Sesame Street.
- "Electronic Can-Can" was the theme music for Wonderama, a Metromedia children's program of the 1970s.
- WNEW-TV channel 5 in New York used it in the 1980s to introduce its Popeye cartoon show.
- "Baroque Hoedown", from Kaleidoscopic Vibrations was the main theme for Disney's Main Street Electrical Parade and El Chapulin Colorado.
- The track was also sampled by The Beatles for their 1968 Christmas Record.
- A Jeopardy! parody on the Saturday Night Live broadcast of October 23, 1976, titled "Jeopardy! 1999", used the 1966 track "Unidentified Flying Object" as its opening and closing theme.
- In 1996 the Beastie Boys released a compilation album with a cover inspired by the 1966 album and also used the same title.
- In 1997, the alternative rock band Smash Mouth released "Walkin' on the Sun", a single whose bassline and opening melody is based on the track "Swan's Splashdown".
