= Moog Indigo =

Studio album by Jean-Jacques Perrey
- Released: May 1970
- Genre: Electronic
- Length: 31:09
- Label: Vanguard
- Producer: Jean-Jacques Perrey

Jean-Jacques Perrey chronology
The Happy Moog (1969)	Moog Indigo (1970)	Moog Sensations (1971)

Singles from Moog Indigo
- 1. "Passport to the Future" Released: 1970; 2. "Gossipo Perpetuo" Released: 1972; 3. "The Rose and the Cross" Released: 1973; 4. "Soul City" Released: 1973

Moog Indigo is the ninth studio album by the French electronic music pioneer Jean-Jacques Perrey, released in May, 1970 on the Vanguard Records label. The album's name is a reference to the jazz song "Mood Indigo" by Duke Ellington.

== Composition and recording ==
In 1963, Perrey and American guitarist Vinnie Bell did a session for Kai Winding, in which Perrey played the Ondioline and Bell played the guitar. After that Vinnie and Perrey recorded several successful commercials, and when Jean-Jacques got a contract with the Vanguard Records label Perrey asked him to be the guitarist on his recording sessions.

Perrey's version of "Flight of the Bumblebee" composed by Russian composer Nikolai Rimsky-Korsakov, uses real bee sounds. Perrey stated how he made this version to the Computer Music Journal magazine:

For this composition, I took a Nagra tape recorder to an apiary in Switzerland to record the live sounds of bees buzzing about their hive. I took these bee tapes back to New York, where my studio had a variable-speed tape recorder. Using this machine, I transposed the bee buzzes to the subdivisions of the 12-tone equal-tempered scale and rerecorded them on another tape machine. Then, using manual splicing techniques, I edited the melody for one verse. Just this part took 52 hours of splicing work. People told me that I was crazy, but I told them to listen to the result! We added an accompaniment to the melody, recreating the "Flight of the Bumblebee" played by living bees.

"Gossipo Perpetuo" versioned Moto Perpetuo written by the Italian violinist and composer Niccolo Paganini and also used "stuttering vocal samples" and "various Moog settings soaring up and down the scale while congas and shuffling drums hit a samba beat." "E.V.A." is a tribute to the first man to walk on the Moon, Neil Armstrong. "The Elephant Never Forgets" is Perrey's adaptation of "Turkish March" composed by German composer Ludwig van Beethoven, the middle part of the track arranged by his friend, American composer Harry Breuer. "18Th Century Puppet" shows clear nods to the baroque composition, and "Hello, Dolly!" by Jerry Herman was versioned.

== Release ==
Moog Indigo was released on the Vanguard Records label in May, 1970, being Perrey's fourth album on the Vanguard label. The album was followed by the single "Passport to the Future", which reached No. 20 on the Adult Contemporary (known at the time as Easy Listening) and No. 106 on the Billboard Hot 100. It also reached #94 in the Cashbox Singles chart. In 1997 when Fatboy Slim remixed the track "E.V.A.", it was released as a single on 15 February, peaked at #79 in British charts and also had a music video. In 2017, Moog Indigo was reissued in a 180 gram 12-inch-Vinyl format by Vanguard label.

== Critical reception ==
Professional ratings
Review scores
Source	Rating
AllMusic	3/5 stars
Exclaim!	9/10
Paste	8.3/10 stars

Retrospective reviews of the album have been generally favorable. Alan Ranta from Exclaim! magazine declared that "there are countless creative opportunities to be found in this half-hour trip that have yet to be fully explored, and for the rest of us, it's an opportunity to experience a landmark album of electronic pop that stands the test of time." Robert Ham of Paste magazine stated that "what keeps these records in circulation is the humor that artists like Perrey brought into the mix and how the sounds and spirit found within the grooves call to mind an era when the skies suddenly felt limitless."

The Musoscribe website commented that Perrey's work should not be taken in the same context as other pioneers of electronic music such as Jean-Michel Jarre or Hans-Joachim Roedelius since "his work wasn't as edgy and experimental as that of those other guys." He also felt that it is "a collection of incredibly catchy tunes, delivered in the funnest way imaginable." A retrospective review by AllMusic reviewer Donald A. Guarisco described the album as "a solid choice for fans of the room with a sense of humor". Moog Indigo was ranked as the 66th best album of 1970 by uDiscover Music. The website "Album of The Year" gave it an average score of 75 based on AllMusic and Exclaim! reviews.

== Legacy ==
The Amazing New Electronic Pop Sound of Jean-Jacques Perrey and Moog Indigo "proved to be hugely influential". The track "E.V.A." has been sampled numerous times by hip-hop and rap artists, being "one of the most sampled track" in hip-hop and rap history. Notable examples include "Just To Get A Rep" by Gang Starr (1990), "Lower da Boom" by Artifacts (1994), "Gameplan" by Lord Finesse (1995), "3000" by Dr.Octagon (1996), "Same Ol'Thing" by A Tribe Called Quest (1997), "Lunch Money" by Pusha T (2014), and "Every Little Thing I Do" by Jamila Woods and Taylor Bennett (2017).

For years, his music has been used in different entertainment media; In 2004, "E.V.A." featured in a Zelnorm commercial, and in a 2016 Apple advertising campaign, "Shot on iPhone". "E.V.A." also appeared in the 2018 film, Ocean's 8. Mexican comedian Chespirito used some Moog Indigo pieces in his television series: "Country Rock Polka" was used in his namesake series, and "The Elephant Never Forgets" was used as the theme song for the Mexican series El Chavo del Ocho. The latter also was the main theme of the Canadian TV program The Buck Shot Show.

== Track listing ==
Side A

All tracks are written by Jean-Jacques Perrey, except where noted.

No.	Title	Writer(s)	Length
1.	"Soul City"	Pat Prilly; Andy Badale	2:05
2.	"E.V.A."	Jean-Jacques Perrey; Marie Perreault; Badale	3:11
3.	"The Rose and the Cross"	Gilbert Sigrist	2:39
4.	"Cat in the Night"	Prilly; Badale; Gary Carol	3:34
5.	"Flight of the Bumblebee"	Rimsky-Korsakov, arr. by: Perrey; Breuer; Carol	2:11
6.	"Moog Indigo"	Perrey; Badale	2:57

Side B

No.	Title	Writer(s)	Length
1.	"Gossipo Perpetuo"	Paganini, arr. by: Perrey; Breuer; Carol	2:09
2.	"Country Rock Polka"	Breuer; Prilly	2:31
3.	"The Elephant Never Forgets"	Beethoven, arr. by: Perrey; Breuer; Carol	2:29
4.	"18Th Century Puppet"	Mozart, arr. by: Prilly; Breuer	2:41
5.	"Hello, Dolly!"	Jerry Herman, arr. by: Perrey	2:00
6.	"Passport to the Future"	Paul Mauriat and André Pascal, arr. by: Perrey; Badale	2:42
Total length:			31:09
