= Vinnie Bell =

American guitarist (1932–2019)

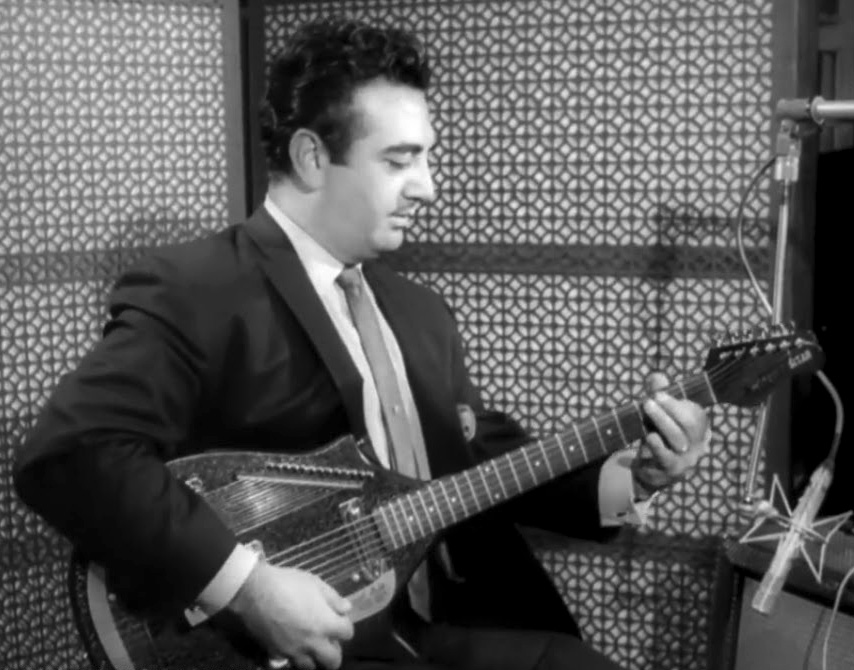
- Bell playing the Coral electric sitar in 1967

Background information
- Also known as: Vincent Bell
- Born: Vincent Edward Gambella; July 28, 1932; Brooklyn, New York, U.S.
- Died: October 3, 2019 (aged 87) Tenafly, New Jersey, U.S.
- Genres: Pop music
- Instruments: Guitar; electric sitar; mandolin; banjo
- Years active: 1955–2019
- Website: www.vinniebell.com

Vincent Edward Gambella (July 28, 1932 – October 3, 2019), known as Vinnie Bell, was an American session guitarist, instrument designer and pioneer of electronic effects in pop music.

== Life and career ==
Vinnie Bell was born in Brooklyn, New York City, and studied guitar from childhood. He made his first recordings as a session musician on singles by such instrumental groups as the Overtones and the Gallahads, and played in nightclubs in New York City in the late 1950s. During this time, he developed his characteristic "watery" guitar sound, popular in instrumental recordings in the 1960s. By 1962, Bell decided to devote his energies to working as a studio musician in New York and Los Angeles. In 1963, he did a session with the French musician Jean-Jacques Perrey for Kai Winding, in which he played the guitar and Perrey played the Ondioline. After that, Vinnie, along with Perrey, recorded several successful commercials, when Jean-Jacques got a contract with the Vanguard Records label. Perrey asked him to be the lead guitarist for his recording sessions as "E.V.A." from Moog Indigo (1970).

He also helped design a number of electric guitar models with the company Danelectro for its Coral line of instruments, including the "Bellzouki" electric 12-string guitar, and the electric sitar, which was used, not necessarily by Bell, on such hits as "Cry Like a Baby" by The Box Tops, "Green Tambourine" by The Lemon Pipers, and a cover of Alfred Newman's love theme from the 1970 film, Airport. The last of these sold over one million copies and was awarded a gold disc. It also won a Grammy Award for Best Instrumental Composition in 1971, while Bell was nominated for Best Instrumental Performance.

As well as being notable for his technical innovations, Bell worked extensively as a session player, playing on tracks such as "The Sounds of Silence" by Simon & Garfunkel and for artists such as the Four Seasons and Bob Dylan, specifically his Desire album. He also recorded occasionally under his own name, his albums including The Soundtronic Guitar of Vincent Bell (Independent Record Company, 1960), Whistle Stop (Verve, 1964), and Pop Goes the Electric Sitar (Decca, 1967).

He died on October 3, 2019, at the age of 87.

== Discography ==
=== Albums ===
- The Soundtronic Guitar of Vincent Bell (1959)
- Whistle Stop (Verve, 1964)
- Big Sixteen Guitar Favorites (Musicor, 1965)
- Pop Goes the Electric Sitar (Decca, 1967)
- Good Morning Starshine (Decca, 1969)
- Airport Love Theme (Decca, 1970) (Peaked at No. 75 on the Billboard Top LPs)

=== Singles ===
- "Airport Love Theme" (US # 31, 1970; AC # 2, 1970, Australia #4)
- "Nikki" (1970) Did not chart

== As sideman ==
With Quincy Jones

- Quincy Jones Explores the Music of Henry Mancini (Mercury, 1964)

With Les McCann

- Les McCann Plays the Hits (Limelight, 1966)

With Clark Terry

- Mumbles (Mainstream, 1966)
