= Turkish music (style) =

Music used during the Classical music period

Turkish music, in the sense described here, is not the music of Turkey, but rather a musical style that was occasionally used by European composers, most notably during the Classical era of Western art music. This music was modelled—though often only distantly—on the music of Turkish military bands, specifically the Janissary bands.

Although the "Turkish style" (alla turca) reached its height during the Classical period, composers as far back as the middle Baroque era had already written musical pieces in homage to Turkish military bands, such as Jean-Baptiste Lully's Marche pour la Cérémonie des Turcs from Le Bourgeois gentilhomme.

== History ==
An important impetus for Turkish music occurred in 1699, when Austria and the Ottoman Empire negotiated the Treaty of Karlowitz. To celebrate the treaty, the Turkish diplomatic delegation brought a Janissary band along with other performers to Vienna for several days of performances.

Although the Janissary sound was familiar in Europe during the 18th century, the Classical composers were not the first to make use of it; rather, the first imitators were military bands. The cultural influence at first involved actual importation of Turkish musicians, as Henry George Farmer relates:

The credit for having introduced this battery of percussion and concussion into Europe usually goes to Poland which, in the 1720s, had received a full Turkish band from the Sultan. Russia, not to be outdone, sought a similar favour of the Sublime Porte in 1725, Prussia and Austria following suit, and by the 1770s most other countries had fallen under the sway of Janissary Music.

The importation of actual musicians was only a temporary phenomenon, and the later custom was to assign the Turkish instruments in European military bands to other performers.

Thus, Turkish music in Europe had two connotations—Eastern and military—for 17th- and 18th-century European composers. The Turkish association did not evaporate soon. Even during the 1820s, in planning the last movement of the Ninth Symphony, Beethoven made a note to himself specifically stating that it would contain "Turkish" music. The use of the slang term "Turkish section" to describe the percussion section of an orchestra apparently persisted into modern times.

Eventually it became possible to write music with bass drum, triangle, cymbals, and piccolo without evoking a Turkish atmosphere, and in the later 19th century symphonic composers made free use of these instruments. Thus, in the long run, the Turkish instruments are a gift to Western classical music from the Ottoman military music tradition.

== Description ==
Turkish music (in the sense just given) is always lively in tempo and is almost always a kind of march.

When Turkish music was scored for orchestra, it normally used extra percussion instruments not otherwise found in orchestras of the time: typically, the bass drum, the triangle, and cymbals. These instruments were used by Ottoman Turks in their military music, so at least the instrumentation of "Turkish" music was authentic except for the triangle. Often there is also a piccolo, whose piercing tone recalls the shrill sound of the zurna (shawm) of Ottoman Janissary music.

It seems that at least part of the entertainment value of "Turkish" music was the perceived exoticism. The Turks were well known to the citizens of Vienna (where Mozart, Haydn, and Beethoven all worked) as military opponents, and indeed the centuries of warfare between Austria and Ottoman Empire had only started going generally in Austria's favor around the late 17th century. The differences in culture, as well as the frisson derived from the many earlier Turkish invasions, apparently gave rise to a fascination among the Viennese for all things Turkish—or even ersatz Turkish. This was part of a general trend in European arts at the time; see Turquerie.

== Examples ==
All three of the great Classical era composers, Haydn, Mozart, and Beethoven, wrote Turkish music. For sound files illustrating some of these works, see the External links section below.

=== Haydn ===
- Haydn's opera L'incontro improvviso ("The Unforeseen Encounter", 1775) is somewhat similar in its subject to Mozart's later "Abduction from the Seraglio" and also includes "Turkish" music, for instance the overture.
- Haydn's Military Symphony (1794) uses "Turkish" music in both the second movement (which depicts a battle) and in a brief reprise at the end of the finale.

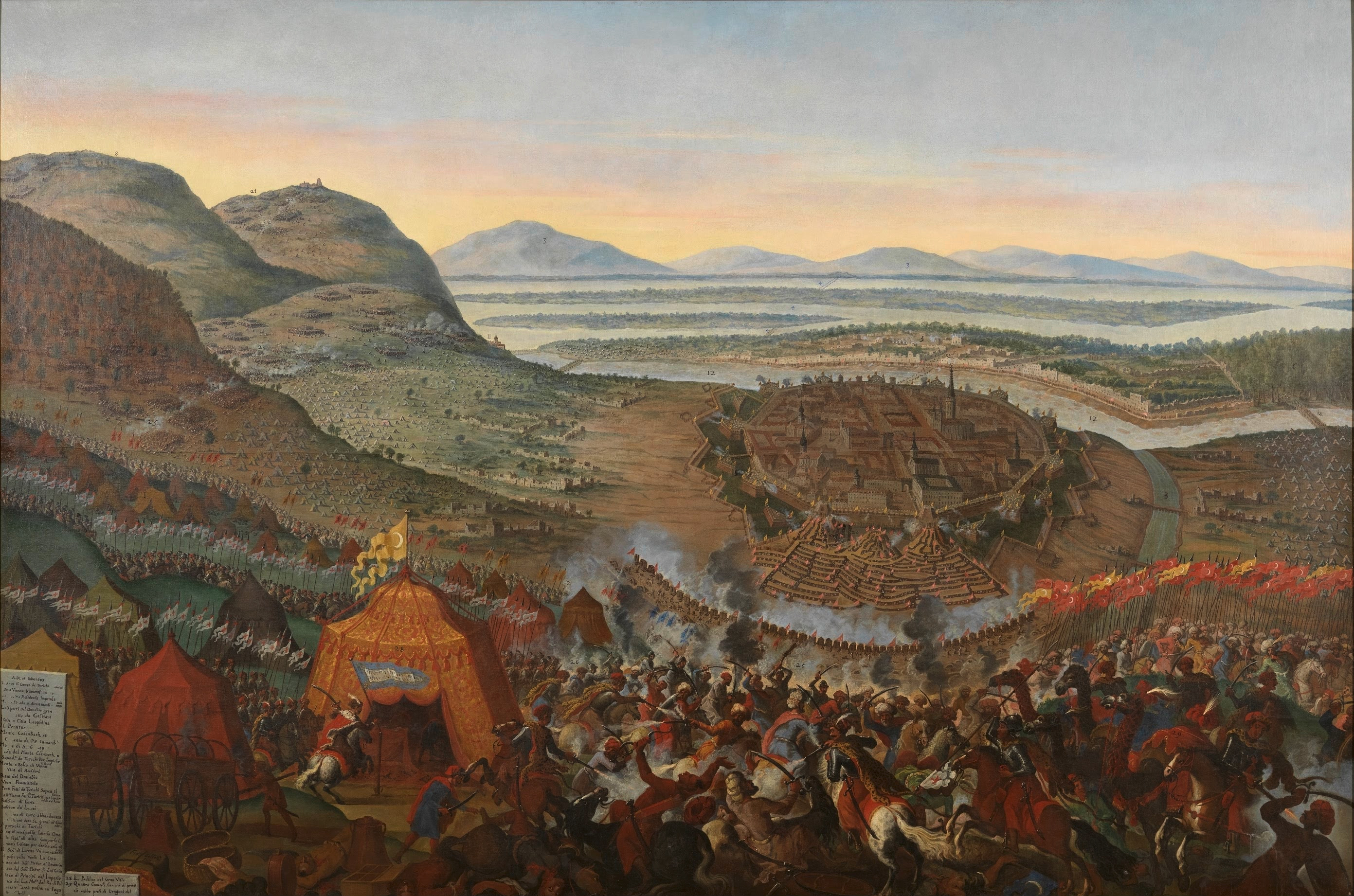
The Turkish siege of Vienna is relieved (1683), painting by Frans Geffels

Haydn had a somewhat remote personal connection to the Turkish army — his paternal grandparents had been living in Hainburg when it was destroyed by the Turks during the invasion of 1683; unlike most of the citizens of Hainburg, they survived the attack.

=== Mozart ===
- Mozart's 1782 opera Die Entführung aus dem Serail (The Abduction from the Seraglio) is the quintessential work of Turkish music, as the whole plot centers on the stereotyping of comically sinister Turks. (The Pasha, at least, turns out noble and generous in the end.) The overture to the opera as well as two marches for the Janissary chorus are Turkish music in the sense just described. This and other contemporaneous operas were so influenced by the Turkish fashion they earned the popular name "Turkish opera."
- The Piano Sonata in A, K. 331 (1783) ends with the famous rondo marked "Alla Turca". Repeated notes, repeated ornaments, and loud/soft passages are characteristic of the Turkish style. The imitation probably came closer with the piano of Mozart's day, whose bass strings made something of a rattle when played loudly, than is possible on modern pianos.
- The finale of the Violin Concerto No. 5 in A major K. 219 (1775), sometimes called the "Turkish" Concerto, is interrupted by a loud episode of Turkish music. Mozart adapted this passage from an earlier ballet, Le gelosie del seraglio (The Jealous Seraglio Women) K. 135a, composed for Milan in 1772. In the concerto, the cellos and double basses add to the percussive effect by playing their instruments coll' arco al roverscio, that is to say, col legno, striking the strings with the wood of the bow.

=== Beethoven ===
- In 1811, Beethoven wrote an overture and incidental music to a play by August von Kotzebue called The Ruins of Athens, premiered in Pest in 1812. One item from the incidental music (Op. 113, No. 4) is the Turkish march. Beethoven also wrote a set of variations on his march for piano, Op. 76.
- Beethoven's Wellington's Victory (1813) commemorates the British victory in the Battle of Vitoria. The opposing British and French armies march to battle with Turkish music versions of their respective battle songs, "Rule Britannia" and "Malbrouk s'en va-t-en guerre".
- Beethoven returned again to Turkish music, by this time rather out of vogue, in a passage of the final movement of his Ninth Symphony (1824). A tenor soloist, assisted by the tenors and basses of the chorus, sings a florid variation on the famous theme, accompanied by Turkish instruments playing pianissimo (Froh! Froh, wie seine Sonnen, seine Sonnen fliegen...).

=== Others ===
Turkish music also appears in works of Jean-Philippe Rameau, Michael Haydn (Marcia turchesca, MH 601), Gioacchino Rossini, Ludwig Spohr, in two operas of Gluck – Die Pilger von Mekka (1764) and Iphigenie auf Tauris (1779) – and in Symphony No. 6 in A minor ("Sinfonie turque") by Friedrich Witt (1770–1836). Paul Wranitzky, who in his lifetime was one of Vienna's most famed composers also wrote Turkish influenced music, including a large-scale symphony. Franz Xaver Süssmayr, best known for completing Mozart's unfinished Requiem, also composed several Turkish works, including operas and symphonies (his "Sinfonia turchesca" for example). Other composers who have written excellent examples of Turkish music include Joseph Martin Kraus, Ferdinand Kauer, Carel Anton Fodor ("Rondo alla turque" from his concerto for keyboard Op. 12) and Ferdinando Paer.

== Musical characteristics ==
Typical Turkish rhythm
Reconstruction of Turkish Stop on Early Pianos

In Turkish music, the percussion instruments often play this rhythm:

This is the same rhythm as the marching cadence of soldiers: "Left ... left ... left, right, left ..."

The melodic instruments in Turkish music often emphasize the rhythm by playing grace notes, either singly or several in succession, on the beat.

Both characteristics just mentioned can be seen in the following extract of Turkish music in the Mozart's Violin Concerto No. 5:

Piano reduction
Mozart Turkish Theme from Violin Concerto No. 5

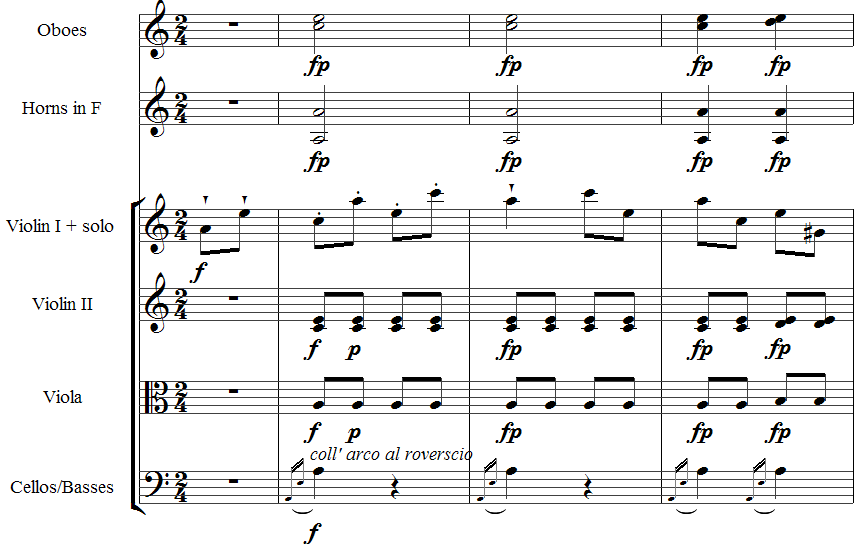

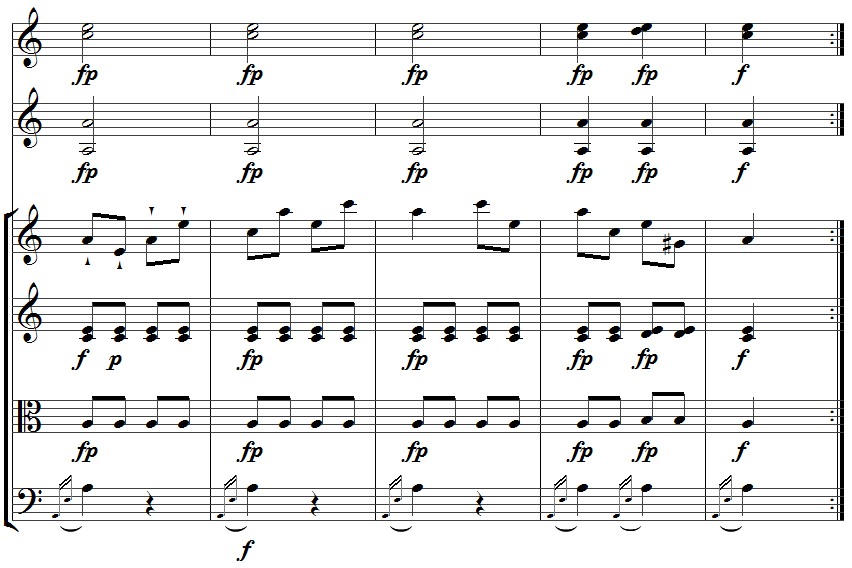

The military rhythm and grace notes are also seen in left hand part for this passage from the Turkish music in Mozart's K. 331 piano sonata, mentioned above:

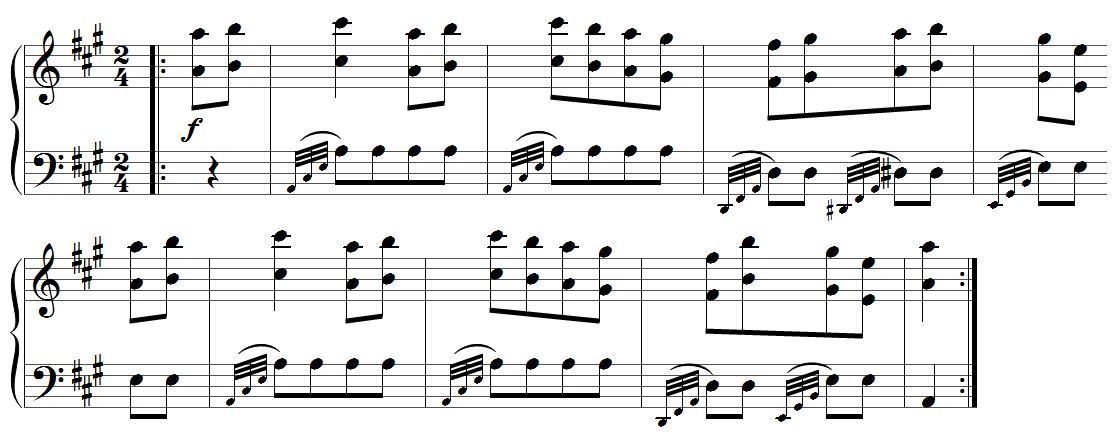

The role of Turkish music in a larger work seems to be to serve as a form of musical relaxation. Thus, in the finale of Beethoven's Ninth Symphony, the Turkish march serves as a period of lowered intensity between two more massive and emotionally charged sections. Turkish music commonly is found in finales, which (as Charles Rosen point out) are typically the most relaxed and loosely organized movements of Classical works.

== The "Turkish stop" on early pianos ==
Around the turn of the 19th century, "Turkish" music was so popular that piano manufacturers made special pianos with a "Turkish stop," also called the "military" or "Janissary" stop. The player would press a pedal that caused a bell to ring and/or a padded hammer to strike the soundboard in imitation of a bass drum. The sound file for the first musical example above attempts to mimic the latter effect manually with a modern piano.

According to Edwin M. Good, the Turkish stop was popular for playing the Mozart K. 331 rondo, and "many were the pianists who gleefully used the Janissary stop to embellish it."

== Books ==
- Farmer, Henry George (1950) Military Music. London: Parrish.
- Finscher, Ludwig (2000) Joseph Haydn und seine Zeit. Laaber, Germany: Laaber.
- Good, Edwin (1999) "Grand and Would-Be Grand Pianos," in James Parakilas, ed., Piano Roles (New Haven: Yale University Press, 1999).

== Articles ==
- "Janissary music" in Grove Music Online, accessed January 8, 2011.
- Signell, Karl. "Mozart and the Mehter," Turkish Music Quarterly I/1 (1988)
