= The Buck Shot Show =

Canadian children's TV series

The Buck Shot Show is a local children's television series that aired on CFCN Television in Calgary, Alberta, Canada from 1967 to 1997. From 1967 to 1992 it was a daily program, airing at noon. From 1992 to 1997 it aired Saturday and Sunday mornings. At the time of its cancellation it was the longest-running children's television show in Canadian history.

The show's host, the avuncular, cowboy-hatted Buck Shot, was played by Calgary entertainer Ron Barge. Other characters included Benny the Bear, Clyde the Owl and Farley, all performed by puppeteers Jim Lewis and Phil Gordon-Cooper. Following the television show's end, Barge and puppeteer Jim Lewis continued to perform around Calgary until 2015.

The theme music for the series was "The Elephant Never Forgets", a playful version of Beethoven's "Turkish March" from 1970 composed by electronic music pioneer Jean-Jacques Perrey. It is better known as the opening theme for the Mexican sitcom El Chavo del Ocho.
