= List of electrophones by Hornbostel–Sachs number =

The Hornbostel–Sachs system of musical instrument classification groups all instruments which make sound primarily by way of electrically driven oscillators. Though Sachs divided the category of electrophones into three distinct subcategories, specifying these three as:

- 51 - Electrically actuated acoustic instruments
- 52 - Electrically amplified acoustic instruments
- 53 - Instruments which primarily produce sound with electrically driven oscillators

In the present day only instruments belonging to this last subcategory are considered "electronic musical instruments".

== List ==
- ANS synthesizer
- Chamberlin
  - Mellotron
- Clavioline
- Croix Sonore
- Electronde
- Electronic drum
- Electronic keyboard
- Hammond organ
- Moog modular synthesizer
- Novachord
- Ondes Martenot
  - Therevox
- Ondioline
- Oramics
- Radiodrum
- Spharophon
- Stylophone
- Synthesizer
  - Analog synthesizer
  - Digital synthesizer
- Telharmonium
- Theremin
  - Electro-Theremin
- Trautonium

== See also ==
- List of classic synthesizers
- List of Hammond organs
