= The Ruins of Athens =

Incidental music by Ludwig van Beethoven

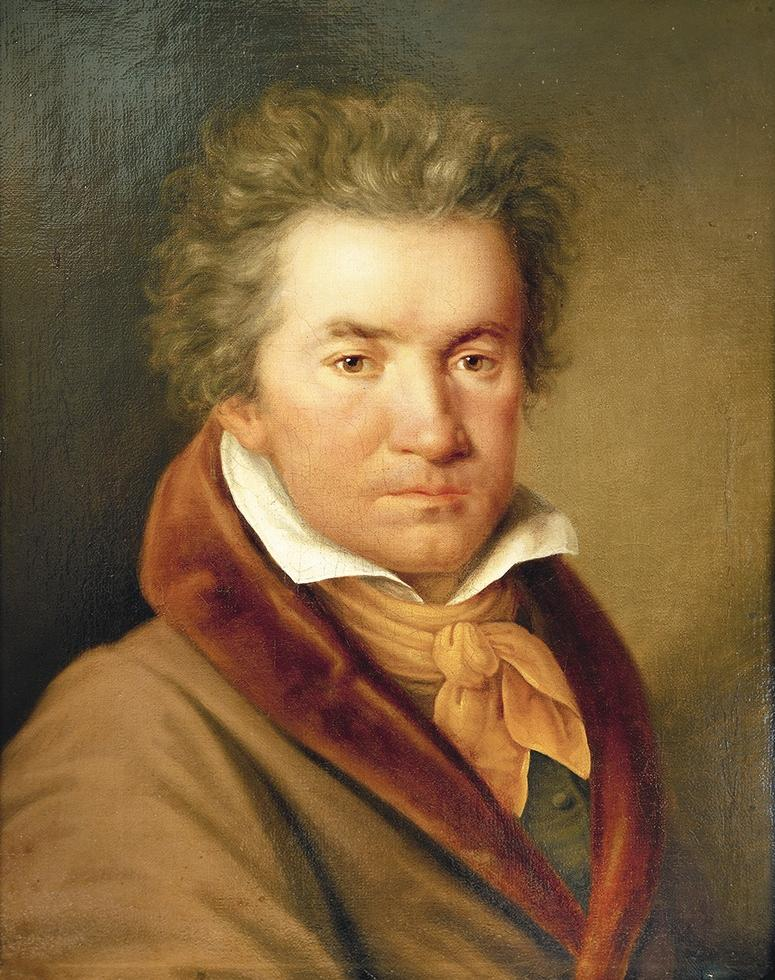
Ludwig van Beethoven (age 44) depicted in a portrait by Joseph Willibrord Mähler (1815)

The Ruins of Athens (Die Ruinen von Athen), Op. 113, is a set of incidental music pieces written in 1811 by Ludwig van Beethoven. The music was written to accompany the play of the same name by August von Kotzebue, for the dedication of the new Deutsches Theater Pest in Pest, Hungary.

Perhaps the best-known music from The Ruins of Athens is the Turkish March. Beethoven had used this material before in his Six Variations on an Original Theme, Op. 76 (1809).

At the eve of the Greek War of Independence, in 1822, the play was revived for the reopening of Vienna's Theater in der Josefstadt with a revised libretto by Carl Meisl, for which Beethoven wrote a new overture, now known as The Consecration of the House, Op. 124, and added a chorus "Wo sich die Pulse" (WoO 98).

The music for The Ruins of Athens was reworked in 1924 by Richard Strauss and Hugo von Hofmannsthal. Another revival with a revision of the text by Johannes Urzidil was conducted by Alexander von Zemlinsky at Prague's Neues Deutsches Theater in 1926.

== Instrumentation ==
The incidental music is scored for these instruments:

Woodwinds
1 piccolo
2 flutes
2 oboes
2 clarinets in B♭, A and C
2 bassoons
1 contrabassoon
Brass
4 horns
2 trumpets
3 trombones (alto, tenor, and bass)

Percussion
timpani
triangle
cymbals
bass drum
castanets
Strings
violins I, II
violas
cellos
contrabasses

== Action of the play ==
The goddess Athena, awakening from a thousand-year sleep (No. 2), overhears two Greek slaves lamenting foreign occupation (Duet, No. 3). She is deeply distressed at the ruined state of her city, a part of the Ottoman Empire (Nos. 4 & 5). Led by the herald Hermes, Athena joins Emperor Franz I at the opening of the theatre in Pest, where they assist at a triumph of the muses Thalia and Melpomene. Between their two busts, Zeus erects another of Franz, and Athena crowns it. The Festspiel ends with a chorus pledging renewed ancient Hungarian loyalty.

== Philhellenism and the Greek War of Independence ==
The Ruins of Athens portrayed the Turkish invaders as destroying the artifacts, buildings, and artistic traditions of Athens, ruling over the Athenian citizens as "barbarians". Beethoven represents the barbarism of the Turks through musical numbers such as a choir of dervishes and a noisy Turkish march, which Athena explicitly describes as an assault on her ears. He also uses Orientalist musical features in the numbers associated with Turkey that are intended to elicit disgust, in contrast to the complex harmonies and motivic developments used for the Greek characters.

The Greek War of Independence broke out in 1821. Beethoven was sympathetic to it and, in 1823, sought to revise his Ruins of Athens.

In 1823, Beethoven asked Franz Grillparzer to revise The Ruins of Athens to include references to the Greek War of Independence, but Grillparzer pointed out to him that censorship would prevent such a revision. Beethoven then approached Johann Chrysostom Sporschil, seeking to create a new work from scratch based on The Ruins of Athens. This project never materialized, but Beethoven remained sympathetic to the Greek cause.

== Movements ==
The work consists of an overture and eight movements.

Title in German (English)	Tempo and key	Original German text	English translation
Ouverture (Overture)	Andante con moto (G minor) – Allegro, ma non troppo (G major)	(instrumental)	
1. Chor; (Chorus)	Andante poco sostenuto (E♭ major)	Tochter des mächtigen Zeus! erwache! Sein Ruf ertönt! Geschwunden sind die Jahre der Rache! Er ist versöhnt!	Daughter of Mighty Zeus! Awake! Her name resounds! The years of wrath are past! We are reconciled!
2. Duett; (Duet)	Andante con moto – Poco più mosso (G minor)	Ohne Verschulden Knechtschaft dulden, harte Noth! Alle Tage neue Plage um das bischen liebe Brot! Von den Zweigen winkt der Feigen süsse Frucht, Nicht dem Knechte der sie pflegte, Nur dem Herren, dem er flucht! Hingegeben wilden Horden, Tiefgebeugt in ihre Hand, ach! ach! ach! ach! Was ist aus dir geworden, Armes, armes Vaterland!	To suffer slavery, though guiltless, is misery! Every day new sorrow to get our scrap of bread! On its branch shines the fig tree's sweet fruit, not for the slave that tended it but for the cursed master! The people oppressed, bent low by his hand, ah! ah! ah! ah! what has befallen you, my poor fatherland!
3. Chor; (Chorus)	Allegro, ma non troppo (E minor)	Du hast in deines Ärmels Falten; Den Mond getragen, ihn gespalten. Kaaba! Mahomet! Du hast den strahlenden Borak bestiegen Zum siebenten Himmel aufzufliegen, Großer Prophet! Kaaba!	In the folds of your sleeves you have carried the moon and shattered it. Ka’abah! Muhammad! You mounted the radiant Borak and, flew up to seventh heaven, great Prophet! Ka’abah!
4. Marcia alla turca; (Turkish March)	Vivace (B♭ major)	(instrumental)	
5. Harmonie auf dem Theater [Musick hinter der Scene]; (Harmony for the theatrics [Music behind the action])	Allegro assai ma non troppo (C major)	(instrumental)	
6. Marsch und Chor; (March and Chorus) (Op.114)	Assai moderato (E♭ major)	Schmückt die Altäre!— Sie sind geschmückt. Streuet Weihrauch!— Er ist gestreut. Pflücket Rosen!— Sie sind gepflückt. Harret der Kommenden!— Wir harren der Kommenden. Seid bereit!— Wir sind bereit.	Bedeck the altars!— They are bedecked. Swing the censers.— They have been swung. Gather roses!— They have been gathered. Await the priestesses!— We await them. Stand ready!— We stand ready.
Recitativ mit Begleitung [Recitativo] (Recitative with accompaniment [Recitative])	Vivace (G major)	Mit reger Freude, die nie erkaltet, empfangt das holde Schwesterpaar, Denn wo mit hohem Ernst die Muse sittlich waltet, Da opfert auch der Weise gern auf ihrem Altar. Was, mit dem Schicksal kämpfend, Grosse Seelen litten, Das hat Melpomene uns warnend aufgestellt, Indess Thalia, wachend über die Sitten, Zu ernsten Lehren muntern Spott gesellt. Wohlthätig wirkt der Musen geistig Spiel, Der Sterblichen Veredlung ist ihr Ziel.	With lively and ardent joy welcome the two holy sisters, for where the Muse gravely presides we gladly sacrifice at her altar. What great souls have suffered, struggling with fate, Melpomene, as warning, sets before us; while Thalia, keeping watch upon our ways, instructs us by use of merry jests. The Muses’ sport works to our benefit, for mortals’ ennoblement is their goal.
7. Chor; (Chorus)	Allegretto ma non troppo (G major)	Wir tragen empfängliche Herzen im Busen, Wir geben uns willig der Täuschung hin! Drum weilet gern, ihr holden Musen, Bei einem Volke mit offenem Sinn.	We bear responsive hearts in our bosoms, we give ourselves gladly to illusion! Bide with us, ye holy Muses, with a people of open mind.
Arie und Chor (Aria and Chorus)	Adagio – Allegro con brio (C major)	Will unser Genius noch einen Wunsch gewähren, Durch eines Volkes fromme Bitten bewegt, O so erhebe zwischen diesen Altären; Sich noch ein dritter, der sein Bildnis trägt! Er steh’ in seiner Kinder Mitte, Erblicke sich geliebt, geehrt! Er ist's! Wir sind erhört. O Vater Zeus! Gewährt ist uns’re Bitte!	If our guiding spirit will grant our wish, stirred by the people's pious desires, then raise up between these two altars yet a third, bearing His portrait! Let it stand before his children to be seen with love and honor! It is so! We have been heard. O Father Zeus! granted is our desire!
8. Chor; (Chorus)	Allegro con fuoco (A major)	Heil unserm König! Heil! Vernimm uns Gott! Dankend schwören wir auf's Neue; Alte ungarische Treue bis in den Tod!	Hail to our King! Hail! Hear us, God! Thankful, we swear anew old Hungarian loyalty unto death!

== Arrangements ==
In 1846 Franz Liszt composed a Capriccio alla turca sur des motifs de Beethoven (Caprice in the Turkish style on motifs of Beethoven), S.388, based on themes from The Ruins of Athens, mostly the Turkish March. In 1852 he also composed a Fantasie über Motiven aus Beethovens Ruinen von Athen (Fantasia on themes from Beethoven's 'Ruins of Athens'), for piano and orchestra (S.122), and also made versions for piano solo (S.389) and two pianos (S.649).

== Use in popular culture ==
- French composer Jean-Jacques Perrey based the tune of the Turkish March in his composition "The Elephant Never Forgets", which was famously later used as the opening theme for the Mexican TV comedy El Chavo del Ocho.
- In several videos documenting footage of the Warhammer 40,000 video games, the song has had a popular reaction and become a recurring theme among the fans.
- The March is often found as a demonstration tune on electronic keyboards and musical toys, possibly because of its strong percussive sound.
- The Duet and the Dervish Chorus were the background music for several scenes in an Australian film version of Shakespeare's Timon of Athens.
