= Dana Countryman =

American musician

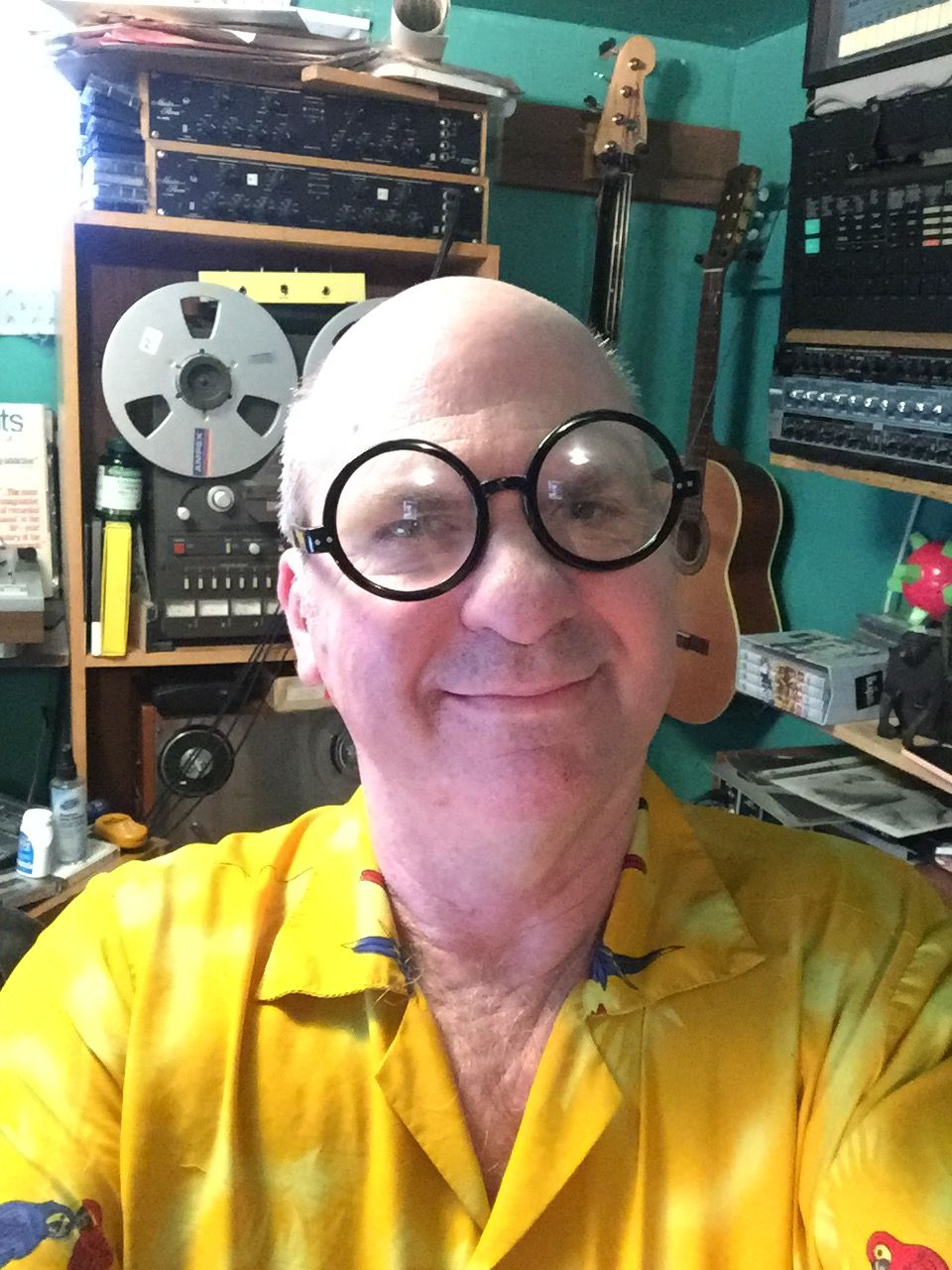
- Countryman in his home studio in Everett, Washington, 2019
- Born: November 11, 1954; Mount Vernon, Washington, United States
- Occupations: Musician, composer, publisher

Dana Countryman is an American electronic music composer, songwriter and performer notable for his sustained presence in the Seattle Pop scene as well as his collaborations with French electropop artist Jean-Jacques Perrey. He is also well known as songwriter and performer for The Amazing Pink Things (1985–1991). as well as the publisher for Cool and Strange Music Magazine (1996–2003). Countryman is currently composing, performing and releasing original albums of retro vocal pop. Reviewer John Borack has described Countryman as "a one-man Brill Building," in reference to the New York-based songwriting and recording scene of the 1960s.

== Career ==
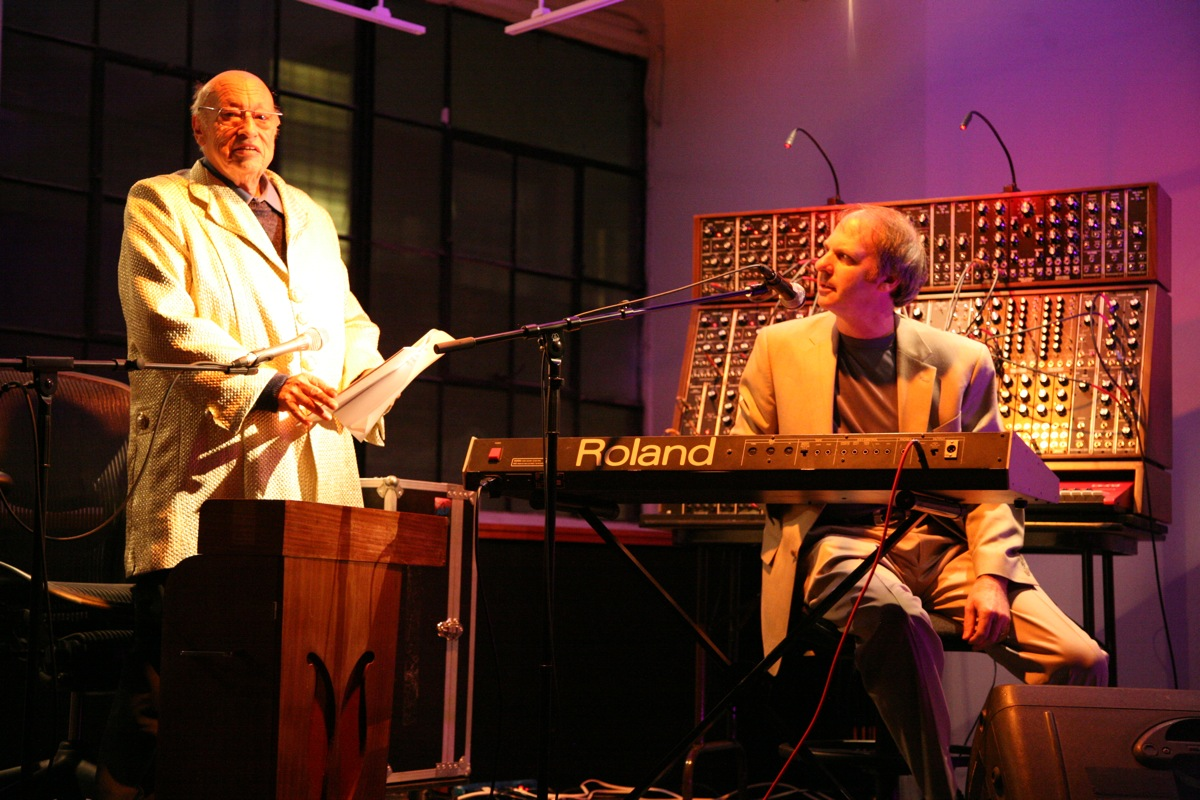
Dana Countryman and Jean-Jacques Perrey in concert, 2006

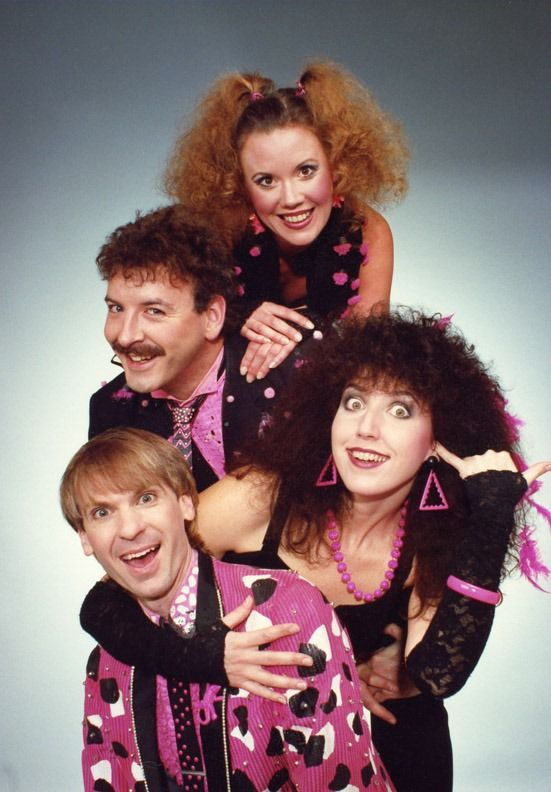
The Amazing Pink Things, 1990: Clockwise from top, Tricia Countryman, Tami Martin, Dana Countryman, Bob Overman.

Countryman performed with numerous bands and became a songwriter and performer with the group The Amazing Pink Things. The group's satirical approach and vocal harmonies were described by Don Heckman of The Los Angeles Times as "...wacko musical lunacy." Heckman also described the group's performance as "a rare evening of sheer inspiration." The group featured two men and two women doing satirical songs with smooth harmonies somewhat similar to the Manhattan Transfer but without the jazz leanings. Music critic Karen Mathieson in The Seattle Times described the Pink Things as "well-matched vocally."

In 1971 Countryman was first exposed to the music of Jean-Jacques Perrey and became "obsessed", according to one account. He was drawn to Perrey's ability to convey the "feeling of happiness and downright joy" in his music. In 1987, The Amazing Pink Things appeared on The Late Show with Arsenio Hall, where they performed their song "We're Just Too White." During the years 1996 to 2003, Countryman published a magazine entitled Cool and Strange Music Magazine.

In 1994, Countryman contacted Perrey to do an interview for his publication, and the two became acquainted. In 2003, Countryman first collaborated with Perrey. Perrey flew to Countryman's studio in Everett, Washington which was described by a reporter as an "analog-synth wonderland." They finished songwriting and mixing their music partly by collaboration over the Internet. They created several albums including The Happy Electro-Pop Music Machine as well as a second album based on "classic spy themes." Reviewer Skylaire Alfvegren in the Los Angeles Examiner found their album Destination Space to be a "more sophisticated understanding of the type of folk drawn to electronic music". The album had "mewling kittens", harpsichords, "bubbly dementia", "astronaut patter" which "flies through the musical cosmos," according to the reviewer. When performing with Perrey, Countryman "spun dials, twisted knobs, and pressed buttons to produce a sweet rush of sugary, sci-fi melodies" and which had a "synthesized, surreal sheen." The album also produced the single "Chicken on the Rocks," which became an underground hit and was featured on an episode of the American Sitcom South Park, Medicinal Fried Chicken.

In 2010, Countryman released a book-length biography of Jean-Jacques Perrey, Passport To The Future:The Amazing Life and Music of Jean-Jacques Perrey (published by Sterling Swan Press).

== Current work ==
2013 saw the release of Pop! The Incredible, Fantastic Retro Pop World of Dana Countryman, an album of songs written in the style of 1960s vocal pop. A review on the website Powerpopaholic described this album as "...a smorgasbord of pop styles...it's pretty safe to say fans of retro pop will enjoy this."

Countryman's second solo album, Pop2! The Exploding Musical Mind of Dana Countryman, was released in 2015. Reviewer Peter Lee describes the album as "...a primer on how to write a perfect pop song," and notes its "focus on chords, melody and arrangement...Countryman doesn’t leave a stone unturned in unleashing every weapon in his arsenal. His musicianship is solid, using various tempos and instruments and employing the use of silence to create anticipation."

Pop3! Welcome To My Time Warp followed in August 2015. A Powerpopaholic reviewer judged this effort Countryman's "...3rd and in my opinion, best volume. Countryman is more consistent here, the melodies are better and the shift in styles from song to song are more natural."

In 2017, Countryman released Girlville! New Songs in the Style of Yesterday's Hits!, a departure from his previous work inspired by the girl-group genre of the early 1960s. The album features 19 original songs performed by a variety of female vocalists, including Tricia Countryman, Lisa Mychols, Molly Felder of Swan Dive, Andrea Perry of Pop 4, Kelly Harland, Lisa Jenio, Julie Johnson Sand, Kathy Hettel, Tana Cunningham and Mary Chris Henry. The album was released on the Australian label Teensville Records. Reviewing the album, Alan Haber wrote that it was "a heartfelt, loving tribute to the sounds of 1960s girl groups" sharing "the same depth of commitment and heart" as Countryman's previous pop songs trilogy, noting that the 19 songs were "sung by an array of talented female vocalists chosen by Dana because they could match him heartbeat for heartbeat."

In October 2017 The Joy of Pop was released, containing 14 new songs. Goldmine magazine reviewer John Borack described the album as "another in a long line of excellent albums that find (Countryman) making like a one-man Brill Building. Taking his musical cues from the Beach Boys, Nilsson, the Beatles, Gilbert O’Sullivan, and various ‘60s/’70s AM radio hits, the unashamedly retro The Joy of Pop is an enjoyable romp..."

Cabaret of Love, released in December 2018, and contained 16 new songs. Adam A. Waltemire, on the Pop Garden Radio blog, reviewed the album as "...an infectious blend of joy, love and fun...superb production, smooth vocals and catchy melodies."

Come into My Studio, released in May 2020, contained 16 new songs. Reviewer 'Explorer,' on the GloryDazeMusic website, describes the album as "...16 tracks of nigh on perfect pop music...fantastic melodies and vocal harmonies to die for...[t]his album is a perfect tonic for the times we are living through. It evokes memories of simpler and yes, better times."

Pop Scrapbook, released in September 2021, is Countryman's most recent album. Reviewer 'Bloody Red Baron', on the Pop Geek Heaven website, said of this album: "Dana Countryman writes pitch-perfect sixties pop songs inspired by Neil Sedaka, Barry Mann and Cynthia Weill, and the Brill Building in general...it’s a labor of love and will effortlessly transport you back sixty years. There is substance to this parfait." "

Countryman released a digital-only selection of tracks from his recent pop albums on the digital music site Bandcamp in January 2022. Pop the World! Its eighteen tracks were offered, in Countryman's words: "I'm giving away an entire albums' worth of my music for FREE!!! Share with your friends, and enemies! Link to it, throw darts at it, whatever! It has absolutely NO commercial potential in the world we currently live in."

== Discography ==
Dana Countryman:

- Peanut Buttery Gumdrop Girl / Don't You Know You'll Break My Heart.

(Recorded at age 16, and released under the name The Cincinnati Ice Cream Factory Explosion Relief Committee, 1971. SAYS Records, 36980) (out of print)

As a member of The Amazing Pink Things:

- Wooters and Hoohah's (Cassette, 1987) Momo Records (out of print)
- Fear of Underwear (Cassette, and then CD, 1989)
- Live at the Hilton - Seattle, WA, 1989 (CD, 2005)

Dana Countryman:

- American Pop (Cassette, 1991) Purely Promotional Records, 1991 (out of print)
- Two Zombies Later (Compilation, 2003) One track: "Cocktails In Space" - Comfort Stand Recordings, 2003
- Interplanetary Materials (Compilation, 2004) One track: "Lovesick Martian Boy" - Comfort Stand Recordings, 2004
- Switched On Bob (CD, 2009, Italy) (Compilation) One track: "Cocktails in Space"
- Synthesizers Dotcom Collective (CD, 2010) (Various Artists) One track: "Beethoven's Piano Sonata No. 14, Third Movement"
- Galactic Hits (CD, 2010, Switzerland) Vibrations Presents (Compilation) One track: "Cocktails in Space"
- Moog-Tastic! - Electronic Melodies from the 24th Century (Oglio Records CD, 2010)
- Pop! The Incredible, Fantastic Retro Pop World of Dana Countryman (Sterling Swan Records, 2013)
- International Pop Overthrow, Vol. 17 (contains the track Jealous Heart; Pop Geek Heaven, 2014)
- Pop 2! The Exploding Musical Mind of Dana Countryman (Sterling Swan Records, 2014)
- John Hunter Phillips and the Hurricane Beach Band (contains the track "I'll Get Right Back to You;" Hurricane Beach Productions, 2014)
- Power Popaholic Fest Original Soundtrack Vol. 4 (contains the track "Twenty-Four Hours with You;" Power Popaholic Productions, 2015)
- Pop3! Welcome to My Time Warp (Sterling Swan Records, 2015)
- Power Popaholic Fest Original Soundtrack Vol. 5 (contains the track "Every Kiss Reminds Me of You;" Power Popaholic Productions, 2016)
- Raymond Scott Songbook (contains the tracks "Huckleberry Duck" and "The Toy Trumpet" performed with Countryman and Jean-Jacques Perrey; Li'l Daisy Records, 2016)
- The Joy of Pop (Sterling Swan Records, 2017)
- Cabaret of Love (Sterling Swan Records, 2018)
- Come into My Studio (Sterling Swan Records, 2020)
- Pop Scrapbook (Sterling Swan Records, 2021)
- Pop the World (Sterling Swan Records, digital release, 2022)

Jean-Jacques Perrey and Dana Countryman:

- The Happy Electropop Music Machine (Oglio Records CD, 2006), with Jean-Jacques Perrey.
- Destination Space (Oglio Records CD, 2008), with Jean-Jacques Perrey.
- Switched On Bob (CD, 2009, Italy) (Comp) One track: Chicken On The Rocks.
- Galactic Hits (CD, 2010, Switzerland)- Vibrations Presents (Compilation) One track: Huckleberry Duck / The Toy Trumpet (A giveaway CD for subscribers to Swiss music magazine "Vibrations".)

Tricia and Dana Countryman:

- In Harmony (Sterling Swan Media CD, 2012)

As producer and songwriter where indicated:

- Sometimes When I'm Dreaming, Tricia Countryman (Sterling Swan Records, 2016)
- Girlville! New Songs in the Style of Yesterday's Hits! (Teensville Records, 2017; all songs written or co-written by Dana Countryman)
- Just the Two of Us: The Duet Album, Tricia Countryman (Sterling Swan Records, 2019)
