= Gilbert Sigrist =

French pianist and conductor (1938–2020)

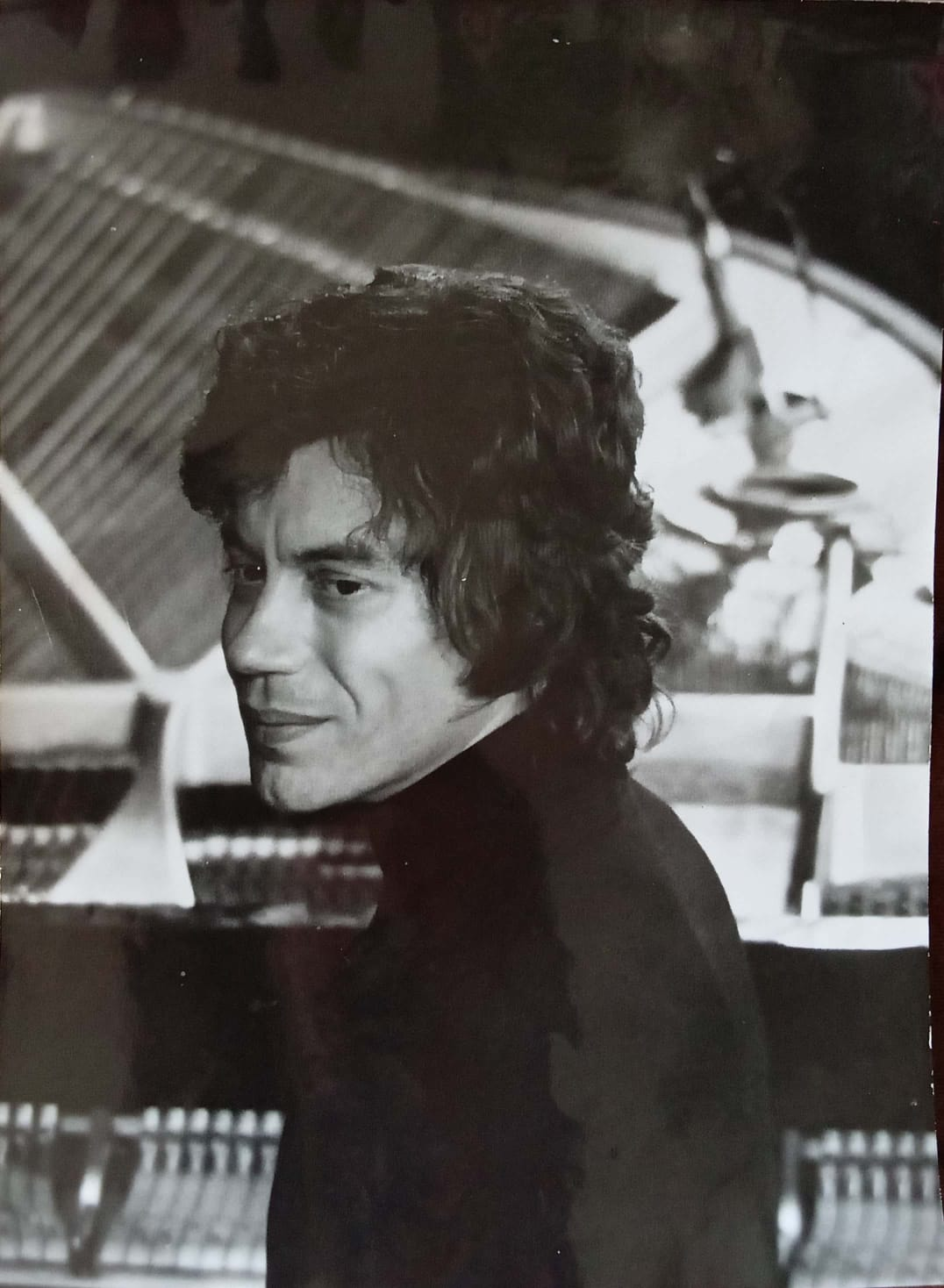
- Gilbert Sigrist during a rehearsal session with Gilbert Bécaud (1970's)
- Born: February 1938; Belfort, France
- Died: 2 May 2020 (aged 82); Montbéliard, France
- Occupation: Pianist

Gilbert Sigrist (February 1938 – 2 May 2020) was a French pianist and conductor. He notably accompanied Gilbert Bécaud, Charles Aznavour and Barbara. He also recorded an album, Dynamoog, with the electronic music virtuoso Jean-Jacques Perrey, in 1976.
