= Turkish March (Beethoven) =

Well-known classical march theme from The Ruins of Athens

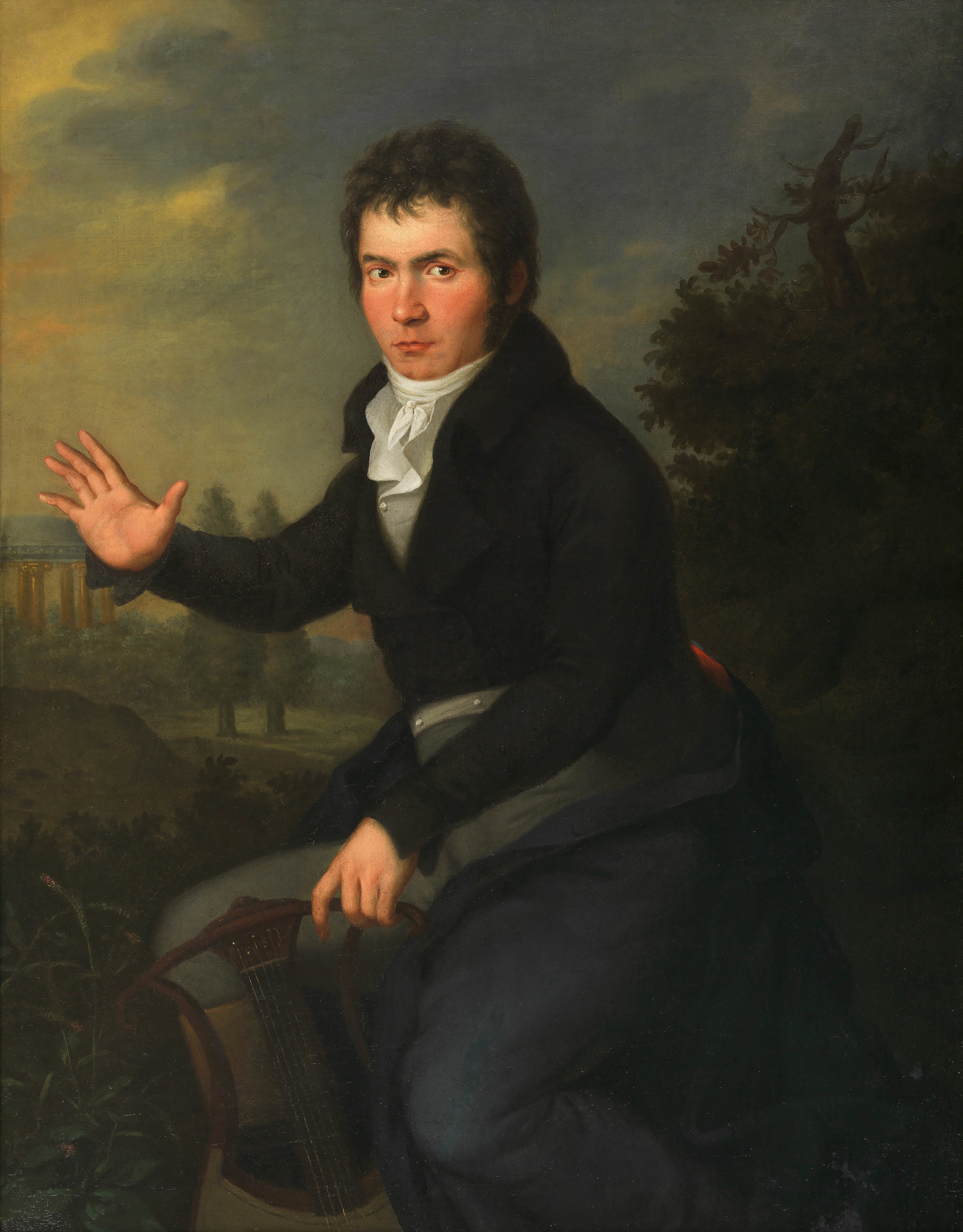
Portrait of Ludwig van Beethoven (age 33) with a lyre-guitar by Joseph Willibrord Mähler (c. 1804)

The Turkish March (Marcia alla turca) is a classical march theme by Ludwig van Beethoven. It was written for the 1809 Six Variations, Op. 76, and is in the Turkish style. Later, in 1811, Beethoven included the Turkish March in a play by August von Kotzebue called The Ruins of Athens (Op. 113), premiering in Budapest, Hungary, in 1812.

The march is in B-flat major, tempo vivace, and 2/4 time. Its dynamic scheme highly suggests a procession passing by, starting pianissimo, poco a poco, rising to a fortissimo climax, and then receding to pianissimo by the coda.

== Beethoven's perception of the Turkish march ==
The Ruins of Athens portrayed the Turkish invaders as destroying the artifacts, buildings, and artistic traditions of Athens, ruling over the Athenian citizens as "barbarians".

Beethoven represents the "barbarism of the Turks" through musical numbers such as a choir of dervishes and the "noisy" Turkish march; he makes Athena explicitly describe the march as an assault on her ears. Beethoven also uses Orientalist musical features in the numbers associated with Turkey that are intended to elicit disgust, in contrast to with the complex harmonies and motivic developments used for the Greek characters.

== In popular culture ==
Franz Liszt wrote a version for piano and orchestra in 1837 entitled "Fantasie über Motiven aus Beethovens Ruinen von Athen" (S. 122). He also wrote a piano transcription titled "Capriccio alla turca sur des motifs de Beethoven" (S. 388) in 1846. Anton Rubinstein arranged a popular piano version of the march in B♭ major. Sergei Rachmaninoff further arranged Rubinstein's version, heard on piano roll (1928).

An electronic version known as "The Elephant Never Forgets" from the 1970 album "Moog Indigo" by electronic music pioneer Jean-Jacques Perrey was used as the theme for the Mexican TV series El Chavo del Ocho, without authorization and without being credited to its author. On 16 November 2009, Perrey, along with Kingsley, Sylvain Meunier, and the heirs of Harry Breuer, Frances, Anthony, and Robert, sued Televisa for using their melodies without permission, Xenon Pictures, Lions Gate, Univision, and Galavisión were also involved in the lawsuits. However, Chespirito was not directly involved in the lawsuit. In 2010, Perrey and the defendants reached a legal settlement in which the defendants had to pay for the use of the melodies "The Elephant Never Forgets", "Baroque Hoedown" (used as the ending theme in Chespirito's parallel TV series El Chapulín Colorado), and "Country Rock Polka" (used to a lesser extent in other of his productions of that time). In addition, Perrey and Kingsley's credit is now prominently mentioned on any El Chavo del Ocho promotional materials.

== Popularity ==
Marcia alla turca is featured as piano track #13 on Yamaha's YDP 101 piano model (track #6 on the YDP 101S variant).
