= Jean-Jacques Perrey =

French composer (1929–2016)

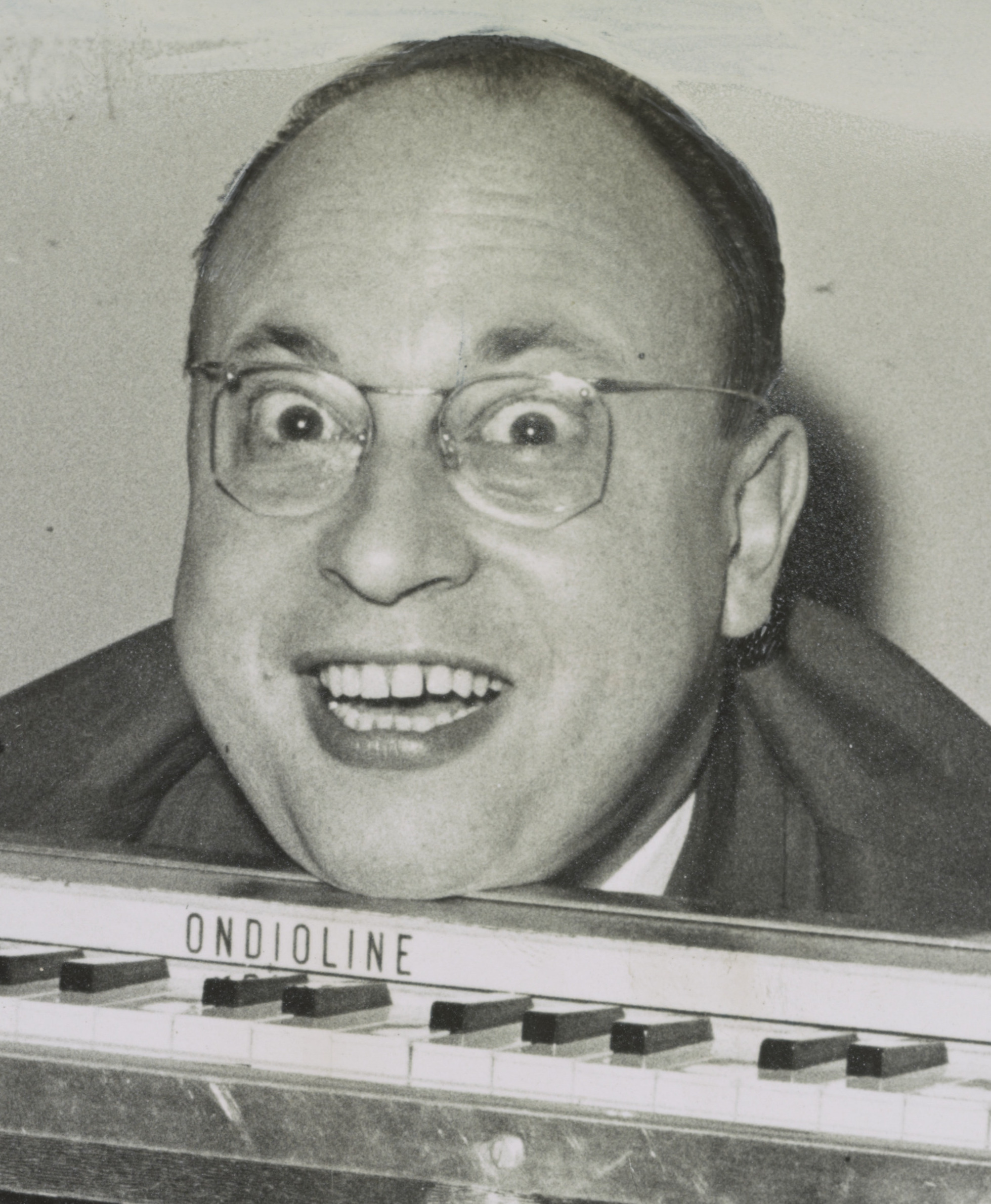
- Perrey in 1960

Background information
- Born: Jean Marcel Leroy; 20 January 1929; Amiens, France
- Died: 4 November 2016 (aged 87) Lausanne, Switzerland
- Genres: Electronic; electropop; easy listening; novelty; space age pop; film soundtracks; avant-garde
- Occupations: Composer; arranger; performer; recording artist; music producer
- Instruments: Synthesizer; piano; Ondioline; Moog synthesizer; accordion
- Years active: 1951–2014
- Labels: MusiCues; Vanguard; Pickwick; Montparnasse 2000; Oglio; Lo; Forgotten Futures

Jean Marcel Leroy (20 January 1929 – 4 November 2016), better known as Jean-Jacques Perrey (French: [ʒɑ̃ ʒak pɛʁɛ]), was a French electronic music performer, composer, producer, and promoter. He is considered a pioneer of pop electronica. Perrey partnered with composer-performer Gershon Kingsley to form the electronic music duo Perrey and Kingsley, who issued some of the first commercial recordings featuring the Moog synthesizer. Perrey was also one of the first to promote, perform, and record with the Ondioline, developed by Georges Jenny.

== Biography ==
=== Early life ===
Jean Marcel Leroy was born in Amiens, in the north of France. He was given his first instrument, an accordion, at age 4 on Christmas Eve, 1933. He learned to play piano and studied music at a conservatory for two months, during which he and several classmates formed a jazz band, which performed at the school and at public venues. However, the school's director warned the students that they could either "continue playing jazz or continue your studies". Perrey was expelled from the conservatory for violating a prohibition against students performing in public; he later graduated from the Lycée d'Amiens. He studied medicine in Paris for four years, and planned to pursue scientific research. He was an avid reader of science fiction, in particular the works of Isaac Asimov, Aldous Huxley, Arthur C. Clarke, and Ray Bradbury, and took occasional work as an accordionist.

=== Start of music career ===
In 1950, while enrolled in medical school, Perrey heard inventor Georges Jenny playing and promoting his homemade Ondioline on a French radio show. "With the audacity of youth [Perrey] phoned the radio station and requested Georges Jenny's telephone number, which he was duly given," wrote music historian Mark Brend. "Perrey then phoned Jenny himself, saying he liked the sound of the Ondioline but couldn't afford to buy one." Perrey offered to promote the instrument if Jenny would give him one for free. After a visit to the inventor's workshop, Perrey was loaned an Ondioline. For six months Perrey practiced playing the Ondioline with his right hand while simultaneously playing piano with his left. Jenny was so impressed with Perrey's proficiency, he offered him a job as a salesman and product demonstrator. After earning substantial commissions on sales made during a trip to Sweden (during which he performed on TV), Perrey quit medical school and devoted his career to electronic music.

In 1951, singer/composer Charles Trenet heard about the Ondioline and requested a demonstration of the instrument by Perrey, who at the time was traveling to promote the new device. Trenet was so impressed that he hired Perrey for the recording session for the song "L'Âme des poètes" ("The Soul of Poets"). At a second session, Perrey played Ondioline on three more Trenet songs; the guitarist on two of those later tracks was Django Reinhardt. "L'Âme des poètes" became an international commercial success, and Perrey was asked to accompany Trenet on stage. "My collaboration with [Trenet] lasted a year," said Perrey, "during which I was able to meet other great artists and singers such as Yves Montand and Jacques Brel. I made my debut on radio and French television, not only as an accompanist of great singing stars, but also performing my own musical act." Perrey began to travel extensively, first in France and then abroad to attend international music fairs. Eventually he developed a cabaret act, "Around the World in 80 Ways", which was a showcase for the Ondioline's versatility. Perrey explained:

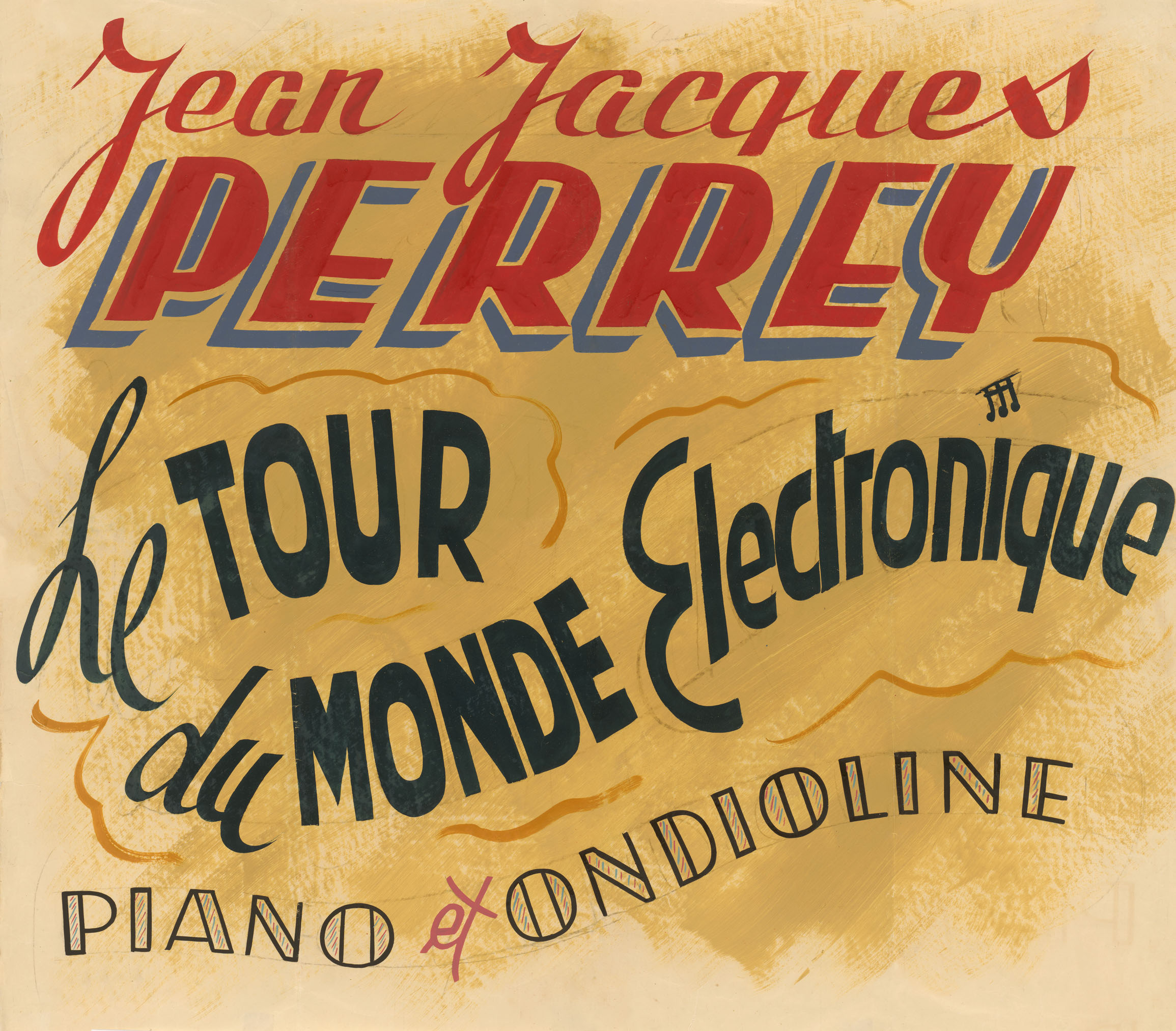
1950s handpainted poster for Perrey's nightclub act

Thanks to the Ondioline, I could imitate instruments from around the world, such as bagpipes from Scotland, American banjo, Gypsy violin, soprano voice, Indian sitar, and so on. I made a world tour in music and finished it with a gag of whistling a tune. At the end, the whistling was still going on (thanks to the Ondioline), but I was drinking a glass of water. We all laughed.

Perrey's first commercially released recording under his own name was Prelude au Sommeil (Prelude to Sleep), issued in 1958, which was described by the artist as an "auditory recipe" to induce sleep in insomniacs. "I had the good fortune of meeting scientists who were interested in the possibilities of using electronic sound for psycho-medical purposes," Perrey later recalled. "Together we had the idea of creating sound complexes to induce calm in disturbed, agitated people. We created a team of researchers: acousticians, medical doctors, physicists, psychiatrists, a total of nine in all. I was the catalyzer, the musician. We spent many hours making experiments to determine which sounds would induce a state of serenity and calm."

In 1959 Perrey performed on a 10" LP entitled Cadmus, Le Robot de l'Espace, a children's record issued on the Philips label; Perrey played Ondioline and provided sound effects. That same year, composer Paul Durand hired Perrey to provide Ondioline accompaniment for the main theme of the French-Italian tragi-comedic film La Vache et le Prisonnier (The Cow and the Prisoner), which starred French actor-singer Fernandel.

=== Relocation to New York ===
At the Studio of Contemporary Music Research in France, Perrey met Pierre Schaeffer, who had pioneered the avant-garde sound art form known as musique concrète. Thereafter, Perrey began to experiment with tape manipulation. Around this time he performed at the Olympia Theater in Paris accompanying France's most acclaimed chanteuse, Edith Piaf, who became an enthusiastic proponent of Perrey's musical gifts. The association with Piaf, Perrey later wrote, proved pivotal in advancing his career.

Edith herself was very impressed by the immense possibilities of the Ondioline. From her, I learned many “tricks of the trade” having to do with show business and song arrangement. She gave me money to buy studio time, which allowed me to record a few pieces on magnetic tape which were a showcase for the Ondioline. She even decided herself which pieces I should record to obtain maximum effect. She was impeccable – very demanding. When she had decided that the tape was “almost perfect,” she told me, “Now you must mail this to a person I’m going to give you the name and address for in New York. I will write him as well, to let him know of your forthcoming correspondence. You’ll see; he will answer you.” It was impossible to debate with Edith; one always had to do as she decreed! Three weeks later, I received an envelope from America. There was no note enclosed – only a round-trip plane ticket with an open return date, plus one word written in big felt-tip pen on the envelope: “COME!” Thus began the fairy tale.

The man to whom Perrey had sent the tape was instrument contractor Carroll Bratman, the well-connected proprietor of Carroll Music. In March 1960, Perrey relocated to New York under the mentorship of Bratman, who sponsored Perrey's green card, paid Perrey's living expenses at the Bristol Hotel on West 48th Street, got him registered with the musicians' union, paid him a salary, and landed him appearances performing the Ondioline on television. Bratman built Perrey an experimental laboratory and recording studio, with state-of-the-art tape recorders, and accorded him free use of any instruments in the Carroll Music collection.

After his arrival in the United States, he recorded two EPs on the French label Pacific Records with the aim of demonstrating the capabilities of the Ondioline for the American public, the first Mr. Ondioline was released in 1960, it consists of four tracks showing Perrey on the cover "donning a dark hood with small slits for the eyes and mouth in an attempt to conjure up the record's mysterious titular figure." The second entitled Ondiolinorama was released in 1961 with a much lower number of units. Both EPs featured Perrey's instrumental arrangements of other songwriters' work.

Perrey made his U.S. television debut on Tonight Starring Jack Paar; he also appeared on The Garry Moore Show, I've Got a Secret, and Captain Kangaroo. Perrey composed jingles for radio and television, sometimes in partnership with Harry Breuer and Angelo Badalementi (working under the name "Andy Badale"). In 1962 Perrey issued the LP Musique Electronique du Cosmos (Electronic Music from Outer Space), in collaboration with Sam Fiedel and Harry Breuer, on the MusiCues label. The album was recorded in New York, but the location was listed as Paris on the jacket to avoid union obligations. The 15 short tracks (most under two minutes long and all composed or co-composed by Perrey) were intended for television and radio background use. Less than 500 copies were reportedly pressed.

=== Perrey & Kingsley and the Moog Synthesizer ===
Perrey was introduced to German-American composer/musician Gershon Kingsley in 1965 at Carroll Music. As a duo, Perrey and Kingsley recorded two albums for the Vanguard label: The In Sound From Way Out! (1966), for which Perrey played Ondioline and provided musique concrète "rhythmic patterns", and Kaleidoscopic Vibrations (1967), on which the duo played mostly Moog synthesizer, with added special effects. Some tracks by Perrey and Kingsley were licensed for radio and television commercials. In 1968, "The Savers", from Kaleidoscopic Vibrations, won a Clio Award when it was used as the soundtrack for a No-Cal diet soft drink commercial.

After splitting from Kingsley, Perrey continued featuring the Moog (as well as Ondioline) on many of his subsequent solo records, most of which incorporated the name "Moog" in album titles like Moog Indigo (1970). On the Moog Indigo track "Flight of the Bumblebee" (adapted from an interlude composed by Nikolai Rimsky-Korsakov), Perrey began with a recording of actual bees:

For this composition, I took a Nagra tape recorder to an apiary in Switzerland to record the live sounds of bees buzzing about their hive. I took these bee tapes back to New York, where my studio had a variable-speed tape recorder. Using this machine, I transposed the bee buzzes to the subdivisions of the 12-tone equal-tempered scale and rerecorded them on another tape machine. Then, using manual splicing techniques, I edited the melody for one verse. Just this part took 52 hours of splicing work. People told me that I was crazy, but I told them to listen to the result! We added an accompaniment to the melody, recreating the "Flight of the Bumblebee" played by living bees.

The Happy Moog! was recorded with Harry Breuer, one of the first musicians he met when he moved to New York City. Perrey played Moog synthesizer and other keyboards, while Breuer played xylophone and other percussion.

=== Return to Europe (1970–2006) ===
After a decade in the United States, Perrey moved back to France in 1970, ostensibly for family reasons. He was named musical director of a ballet company, while continuing to explore therapeutic sounds to treat insomnia. That included a project that involved shooting with dolphins in the waters near Vancouver, Canada. He also wrote and recorded music for television commercials and various French cartoons, and released several albums of this music on the Montparnasse 2000 label. In 1996, after a decade of inactivity because of his mother's death, Perrey began working occasionally with electropop musician/composer David Chazam; a collection of previously unreleased collaborative works, ELA, recorded over a number of years and at various locations, was independently issued by Chazam in May 2015; it was the final album of new Perrey material released during his lifetime.

In 1997 Perrey collaborated with the band Air on the tracks "Remember" (on the album Moon Safari) and "Cosmic Bird" (on the various artists compilation Source Lab 3 Y). The following year he performed at the Klinkende Munt festival in Brussels, Belgium, with David Chazam. In 1999 he composed and recorded "The Groovy Leprechauns" for a thematic compilation album At Home with the Groovebox, issued on the Beastie Boys' Grand Royal label. In 1995 the Beastie Boys had issued an album entitled The In Sound From Way Out! that was an obvious homage to Perrey and Kingsley. In 2001 Vanguard Records released a triple CD entitled The Out Sound From Way In!, which compiles four Perrey and Kingsley albums, two as a duet and solo, plus seven remixes of Perrey and Kingsley's work, including two reworkings from the Moog Indigo song, "E.V.A." by Fatboy Slim and five by Eurotrash.

In 2003, MediaDreams Productions produced a documentary titled Jean-Jacques Perrey: Extraterrestrial Musician, which was presented at MIPCOM in 2003. With Luke Vibert Perrey recorded an album titled Moog Acid, which was released in 2007. AllMusic reviewer John Bush observed that Perrey "uncannily conjures the rather eerie ghosts of musique concrète's past, while Vibert anchors them with expert productions. ... The tracks are ... the 21st century equivalent of Perrey-Kingsley's vision of lock-solid arrangements accompanied by the far-out sound of the Moog as a lead voice."

=== Later years (2006–2016) ===
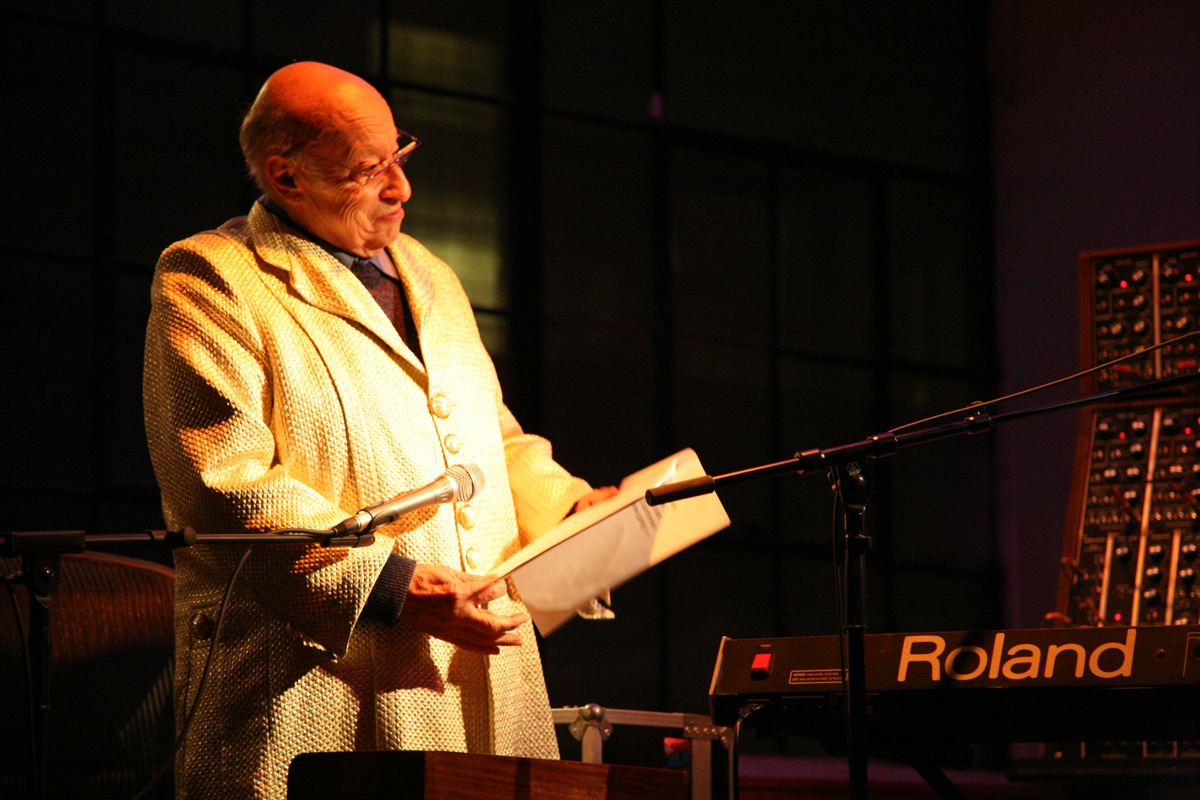
Perrey performing, 29 August 2006

Perrey and Dana Countryman released the collaborative album Destination Space in 2008; AllMusic reviewer William Ruhlmann wrote that "this is not an album to be taken seriously, but it is one to enjoy." Also in 2008, Perrey and Countryman made a rare appearance in the UK, playing at the AV Festival at the Sage, Gateshead. In 2009, Giles Weinzaepflen produced a film documentary Prélude au Sommeil about Perrey's life and work. Dana Countryman also wrote a biography of Perrey titled Passport to the Future, which was published in 2010 through CreateSpace.

In 2013, Belgian-Australian musician Wally (Gotye) De Backer composed and recorded a song inspired by Perrey's work, then contacted Perrey to share the track for review. At the time, Perrey was 80 and living in Lausanne, Switzerland. "To my great joy, Jean-Jacques and his daughter, Patricia, both responded really warmly and said it was really sweet that a young musician would be inspired by his work but also respond to it in that way by writing a piece like that, and they invited me to visit,” said De Backer. “To me, it was incredible as a fan and long time listener just to meet the wonderful old man who had a lot of great stories and a wink in his eye, who made time for me to come and chat about the aspects of his work that I was really interested in." Over the next few years, De Backer visited regularly and began helping the aging musician catalog and preserve his legacy. De Backer also began purchasing existing Ondiolines, undertaking their restoration (with technical help from Stephen Masucci), and learning how to play the instrument.

Eventually, after a number of Ondiolines had been reconstructed, De Backer formed the Ondioline Orchestra, consisting of two Ondiolines (played by De Backer and Rob Schwimmer), Moog, Theremin, clarinet, guitar, bass, drums, and sampling devices. The ensemble's debut was scheduled for 22 November 2016, at National Sawdust, in Williamsburg, Brooklyn, with Perrey invited to attend. However, his health declined, and he could not travel. Two and a half weeks before the performance, Perrey died of lung cancer at the age of 87.

De Backer and the Ondioline Orchestra have staged several performances of Gotye Presents a Tribute to Jean-Jacques Perrey: at the Sydney Festival (16–17 January 2017); at the Melbourne Recital Centre (20 January 2017); and at the opening night of Roulette's Mixology Festival (3 February 2018), in Brooklyn. The Sydney concert won a Helpmann Award in the Contemporary Music category. De Backer launched a record label, Forgotten Futures, whose first release was Jean-Jacques Perrey et son Ondioline, a compilation album featuring rare and unreleased tracks with Perrey on the Ondioline. The album was released on vinyl and digitally in May 2017.

== Discography ==
=== Studio albums and EPs ===
- 1958: Prelude au Sommeil (Institut Dormiphone)
- 1959: Cadmus, Le Robot de l'Espace (with Henri Gruel) (Philips)
- 1960: Mr. Ondioline (Pacific)
- 1962: Musique Electronique Du Cosmos (Electronic Music From Outer Space) (MusiCues)
- 1966: The In Sound From Way Out! (with Gershon Kingsley) (Vanguard)
- 1967: Kaleidoscopic Vibrations: Electronic Pop Music From Way Out (with Gershon Kingsley) (Vanguard)
- 1968: The Amazing New Electronic Pop Sound of Jean Jacques Perrey (Vanguard)
- 1968: Electronic Music (unreleased studio demo acetate)
- 1969: The Happy Moog! (with Harry Breuer) (Pickwick)
- 1969: Switched On Santa (engineer, Moog programming; with Sy Mann) (Pickwick)
- 1970: Moog Indigo (Vanguard)
- 1971: Moog Sensations (Editions Montparnasse 2000)
- 1972: Moog Expressions (Editions Montparnasse 2000)
- 1972: Moog Generation (Editions Montparnasse 2000/Zero International Records)
- 1974: Moog Mig Mag Moog (Editions Montparnasse 2000)
- 1976: Dynamoog (with Gilbert Sigrist) (Mondiophone/Crea Sound Ltd)
- 1977: Moog is Moog (with Harry Breuer) (Editions Montparnasse 2000)
- 1980: Kartoonery (with Daniel Longuein and Guy Boyer) (Editions Montparnasse 2000)
- 1982: Energize with Exercise (with Bette and Ione Darrel) (Black & White)
- 1998: Eclektronics (with David Chazam) (Basetonic; Basta Music)
- 2000: Circus Of Life (with Gilbert Sigrist and O.C. Banks) (Koka Media)
- 2006: The Happy Electropop Music Machine (with Dana Countryman) (Olgio)
- 2007: Moog Acid (with Luke Vibert) (Lo Recordings)
- 2008: Destination Space (with Dana Countryman) (Oglio)
- 2010: Froots (with Cosmic Pocket) (In-Vitro Records)
- 2015: ELA (with David Chazam) (Freaksville)

=== Compilations ===
- 1973: The Best Of The Moog (Vanguard)
- 1975: Incredible Synthesizer (Vanguard)
- 1975: The Essential Perrey & Kingsley (Vanguard)
- 2000: Good Moog: Astral Animations and Komputer Kartoons (Kosinus)
- 2001: The Out Sound From Way In! The Complete Vanguard Recordings (Vanguard)
- 2007: Vanguard Visionaries: Perrey & Kingsley (Vanguard)
- 2012: The Electronic Pop Songs (Welk Music Group)
- 2012: Space Age Computer Music (Welk Music Group)
- 2017: Jean-Jacques Perrey et son Ondioline (Forgotten Futures)
- 2019: Past Future Sound Tracks

=== Soundtracks ===
- 1959: Les Folles Aventures d'omer et de Jacques Courtois: Omer en Synovie (Polydor)
- 1971: Glop (Riviera)
- 2006: Moog (one track, with Luke Vibert) (Hollywood Records)

== In popular culture ==
- "Chicken on the Rocks" (from Musique Electronique du Cosmos) was used in a 1960s commercial for the Ideal Toy Company.
- "The Minuet of the Robots" (from The Amazing New Electronic Pop Sound of Jean Jacques Perrey) served as the soundtrack for the Muppet feature "Big Bird's Dance" on 14 December 1969, in The Ed Sullivan Show, it was accompanied by arrangements made by the CBS Studio Orchestra.
- "March of the Martians" (from The Happy Moog!) was used as the opening theme for the program The Hilarious House of Frightenstein.
- "The Elephant Never Forgets" (from Moog Indigo) was used as main theme of the Canadian TV program The Buck Shot Show.
- An orchestral adaptation of "Baroque Hoedown" (from Perrey & Kingsley's Kaleidoscopic Vibrations: Electronic Pop Music From Way Out!) was used as the Main Street Electrical Parade theme at Disney parks.
- Two pieces by Perrey were used as principal themes for television comedy shows created by and starring Mexican comedian Chespirito (Roberto Gómez Bolaños): "The Elephant Never Forgets" also was used as the main theme for El Chavo, and "Baroque Hoedown" (co-composed by Perrey and Kingsley) was the closing theme for El Chapulín Colorado. "Country Rock Polka" was used in the program Chespirito. In 2009 the composers filed a lawsuit against the Televisa Network for improper use of their music; the case was settled and they now receive prominent credit in promotional materials for El Chavo del Ocho.
- In 1973, a cover of "Passport to the Future" (originally from Moog Indigo) by instrumental rock band The Ventures peaked at #38 on the Billboard Adult Contemporary chart.
- The track "E.V.A." (composed by Perrey, Badalamenti, and Marie Perreault, from the album Moog Indigo) has been sampled numerous times by hip-hop and rap artists, notable examples include "Just to Get a Rep" by Gang Starr (1990), "Lower da Boom" by Artifacts (1994), "Gameplan" by Lord Finesse (1995), "3000" by Dr. Octagon (1996), "Same Ol'Thing" by A Tribe Called Quest (1997), "Lunch Money" by Pusha T (2014), and "Every Little Thing I Do" by Jamila Woods and Taylor Bennett (2017).
- In 1996, "E.V.A." was sampled for a UK TV commercial for energy drink Lucozade.
- In 1997, remix artist Fatboy Slim reconfigured the track, and in 2002, electronic artist Glyn Bush (under the name Lightning Head) recorded a "E.V.A." cover version for his album Studio Don.
- In 2004, "E.V.A." was featured in a Zelnorm commercial, in 2016 in an advertising campaign "Shot on iPhone" by Apple and also appeared in the 2018 film, Ocean's 8.
- In 2010, a new recording by Perrey and Dana Countryman of "Chicken on the Rocks" (from The Happy Electropop Music Machine) was used in season 14, episode 3 ("Medicinal Fried Chicken") of the U.S. TV series South Park. That same year, Perrey's "Brazilian Flower" was used in a soccer commercial, and Perrey's music was used in the TV series The Simpsons.
- Perrey's music was used in three short films by David Lewandowski: Going to the Store from 2011 (used the Perrey work "The Little Ships"); Late for Meeting from 2013 (used "The Mexican Cactus"); and Time for Sushi from 2017 (used the song "Dynamoog").
- In 2018, Luke Vibert's Turn EP included a tribute song to Perrey titled "JJP".
- His music was used in the later seasons of SpongeBob SquarePants and its spinoff series The Patrick Star Show.
- The track "Boys and Girls" was used as the end credits theme for The Mighty B!.

== Biography ==
- Brend, Mark (6 December 2012). The Sound of Tomorrow: How Electronic Music Was Smuggled into the Mainstream. Bloomsbury Publishing USA. ISBN 978-1-62356-153-6.
