= Georges Jenny =

- Birth name: Georges Marcel Charles Jenny
- Born: April 29, 1913; Lille, France
- Died: September 23, 1975 (aged 62); Cambo-les-Bains, France
- Genres: Electronic music
- Occupation(s): Inventor, musician
- Instrument: Ondioline
- Years active: 1939–1975
- Website: Ondioline.com

Georges Marcel Charles Jenny (29 April 1913 – 23 September 1975) was a French musician, poet, and electronic instrument builder. His best-known invention was an electronic keyboard instrument called the Ondioline (sometimes referred to as the Jenny Ondioline). It is considered a forerunner of the synthesizer. The Ondioline is monophonic, yet it is capable of generating an array of sounds, and features a keyboard that produces a natural-sounding vibrato via side-to-side finger movements when keys are depressed.

== Development of the instrument ==
Jenny conceived the instrument as a low-cost alternative to the then-well known but expensive Ondes Martenot. The Martenot was used in serious music, but Jenny planned the Ondioline for a broader consumer market, including pop music. He began constructing his first prototype around 1939 (the instrument was as yet unnamed) while recovering from tuberculosis at a sanatorium in the south of France. After the instrument was further refined, Jenny was awarded a patent. In 1946, he took first prize in the inventions competition at the Foire de Paris (Paris Fair).

By the time he began to manufacture it commercially in 1947, the device, now christened the Ondioline, was valve-based and contained a built-in amplifier. Like the Martenot, it had a lateral vibrato keyboard and a knee-lever to control volume. In 1948 Jenny demonstrated the instrument in a German newsreel.

According to Ondioline authority/historian Wally De Backer:

Most Ondiolines (with the exception of transistor models from the 1960s) are built around vacuum tube oscillators and amplifiers. They create harmonically rich waveforms directly in the audible frequency range. Electronic musical instruments that preceded Georges Jenny’s research, such as the theremin and ondes Martenot, tended to use a super heterodyne technique of “beating” two frequencies above the audible range against each other to create a third “difference frequency” which is perceptible. Jenny determined that the raw waveform resultant from the super heterodyne technique was not as harmonically rich a starting point as desirable, and this led him to design the Ondioline’s cathodic coupling oscillator, for which he received his first patent.

For decades Jenny redesigned and manufactured new versions of the instrument at his Paris company, Les Ondes Sonores Jenny (later known as La Musique Electronique). Jenny built the instruments by hand, but according to De Backer, "The instrument was also offered in 'kit' form, where Jenny recommended purchasing the more complex assemblies – such as the keyboard – as complete units. The schematics were made available for amateur engineers to construct their own custom instruments, and they were encouraged to experiment with the amplifier, tone circuits and cabinetry." Jenny never licensed the instrument for mass production.

To promote his new invention, Jenny staged public demonstrations of the instrument on radio and in newsreels.

In his 1949 Beginner's Handbook for Ondiolinists (original French title: Premiers conseils à l'ondioliniste), which was provided to customers who purchased the instrument, Jenny wrote:

You were attracted to the Ondioline because, whether professional musician or amateur, the Ondioline made your dreams come true. We introduced it to you as the least difficult of all musical instruments, and naturally this is true. But the Ondioline is also an instrument offering near endless possibilities. When using the most basic techniques, the player can, from the start, correctly imitate the sound of a flute, or theater organ, for example. But it offers so much more if only the player takes the trouble to spend thirty minutes to an hour practicing every day.

Jenny was diagnosed with poliomyelitis in 1953 and doctors believed he would not walk again. However, he recovered, and by the end of that year he had returned to his electronic music work. In 1957 he authored a book about his instrument.

It is estimated that around 1200 Ondiolines were constructed, most handmade by Jenny himself. To reduce manufacturing costs and keep retail prices affordable, Jenny often used poor quality components; as a result, the instruments required regular maintenance or they would become unplayable.

== Jenny and Perrey ==
The instrument was introduced to a wider audience in the 1950s by electronic music pioneer Jean-Jacques Perrey (who was also an early adopter of the Moog synthesizer). In 1949, Perrey, at the time a medical student, heard Jenny demonstrate the Ondioline on a French radio broadcast. "With the audacity of youth he phoned the radio station and requested Georges Jenny's telephone number, which he was duly given," wrote historian Mark Brend. "Perrey then phoned Jenny himself, saying he liked the sound of the Ondioline but couldn't afford to buy one." Perrey offered to promote the instrument if Jenny would give him one for free. After a visit to the inventor's workshop, Perrey was loaned an Ondioline.

"George Jenny was a visionary — both an engineer and a musician," Perrey later attested. "He invented this instrument in a tuberculosis sanatorium where he was being treated. He was forced to rest, but he could use his mind and his hands to invent."

For six months Perrey practiced playing the Ondioline with his right hand while simultaneously playing piano with his left. Jenny was so impressed with Perrey's proficiency and dexterity, he offered him a job as a salesman and product demonstrator. After earning substantial commissions on sales made during a trip to Sweden (during which he performed on TV), Perrey quit medical school and devoted his career to electronic music. Perrey procured so many orders for Ondiolines during the 1950s that Jenny finally had to open a factory, Les Ondes Sonores Jenny (later known as La Musique Electronique), in Paris.

Into the 1960s, Perrey continued to promote the instrument, touring, performing and recording under the playful pseudonym "Mr. Ondioline."

== Gotye and the Ondioline ==
Since 2016 the instrument has been championed by Australian pop star Wally (Gotye) De Backer, who acquired a number of vintage Ondiolines and began performing concerts with his Ondioline Orchestra in November of that year. In a 2018 interview with Australia's Broadsheet, De Backer said, “You can dial in an incredibly wide range of sounds on the ondioline, and the unique mechanics for playing it allows you to create sounds very sensitively and with a musical deftness I just feel isn't present on most other electronic instruments from the '40s – or decades since."

In 2022, De Backer launched a comprehensive website, Ondioline.com, devoted to the instrument and its history.
