= The Amazing New Electronic Pop Sound of Jean Jacques Perrey =

Studio album by Jean-Jacques Perrey
- Released: 1968
- Genre: Electronic
- Length: 32:40
- Label: Vanguard
- Producer: Jean-Jacques Perrey

Jean-Jacques Perrey chronology
Musique Electronique du Cosmos (1962)	The Amazing New Electronic Pop Sound of Jean Jacques Perrey (1968)	Electronic Music (1968)

Singles from The Amazing New Electronic Pop Sound of Jean Jacques Perrey
- 1. "The Little Ships" Released: 1969; 2. "The Minuet of the Robots" Released: 1973

The Amazing New Electronic Pop Sound of Jean Jacques Perrey is the sixth studio album by French electronic musician Jean-Jacques Perrey, released in 1968 on the Vanguard Records label.

The penultimate song "Four, Three, Two, One" was made together with Billy Mure. The final track "Gypsy in Rio" is a homage to Spike Jones.

== Critical reception ==
Professional ratings
Review scores
Source	Rating
AllMusic	4.5/5 stars

Billboard described it as "a fun album, which admirably accomplished [Perrey's] stated purpose: to show that electronic music need not be esoteric. He utilizes tapes and various apparatus to accomplish this." For the 1996 album reissue, the US magazine described the album as "a campy and entertaining 1968 solo project of synthesized blurps, bleats and solid-state noodling".

AllMusic reviewer Richie Unterberger said that it "sounds like nothing so much as late-'60s instrumental 'mood' music albums as refracted through a slightly more ambitious, electronic lens. It's really not something you can put on again and again, but it's kind of fun nonetheless."

== Track listing ==
No.	Title	Writer(s)	Length
1.	"Mary France"	Jean-Jacques Perrey; Andy Badale	2:49
2.	"The Little Ships"	Perrey	2:19
3.	"Island in Space"	Perrey; Badale	2:44
4.	"The Mexican Cactus"	Perrey; Eileen Davies	2:16
5.	"Porcupine Rock"	Perrey; Davies	2:18
6.	"The Little Girl from Mars"	Perrey; Stanley Krell	2:58
7.	"Mister James Bond"	Perrey; Badale	3:03
8.	"Frere Jean Jacques"	Perrey	2:39
9.	"Brazilian Flower"	Perrey; Davies	1:57
10.	"In the Heart of a Rose"	Perrey; Davies	2:43
11.	"The Minuet of the Robots"	Harry Breuer; Pat Prilly	2:18
12.	"Four, Three, Two, One"	Davies; Prilly	2:34
13.	"Gypsy in Rio"	Perrey; Breuer; Gary Carol	2:02
Total length:			32:40

== Personnel ==
Adapted from the album's sleeve notes.

- Jean-Jacques Perrey – instruments
- Ed Friedner – engineering and special effects
- Peter Bramley – artwork

== Uses in other media ==
"The Minuet of the Robots" was the soundtrack for the Muppet feature "Big Bird's Dance" on December 14, 1969, in The Ed Sullivan Show, accompanied by arrangements made by the CBS Studio Orchestra. In 2010, "Brazilian Flower" was used in an NFL fantasy football commercial. Two pieces from this album were used in short films by David Lewandowski: Going to the Store from 2011 used "The Little Ships", and Late for Meeting from 2013 used "The Mexican Cactus".
