= No-Cal =

Diet soda

- Type: Soft drink
- Origin: United States
- Introduced: 1952
- Flavor: chocolate, black cherry, ginger ale, root beer

No-Cal was the first diet soda. It was initially marketed to diabetics in a number of flavors, the most popular being black cherry.

== History ==
Hyman Kirsch and his son Morris, both Russian immigrants living in Williamsburg, Brooklyn, New York, began selling sodas in 1904. Their involvement with the Jewish Sanitarium for Chronic Disease (now known as Kingsbrook Jewish Medical Center), led them to the invention of a sugar-free drink to meet the needs of the hospital's diabetic patients.

Kirsch Beverages developed a line of zero-calorie soft drinks that they called No-Cal, which they began selling in 1952. The soda was produced at the company's plant in College Point, Queens, New York.

Initially it came only in ginger ale, sweetened with sodium cyclamate. Later, root beer and black cherry were added, the latter becoming the flagship flavor. Eventually they added lemon, cola, coffee, and chocolate sodas.

Eventually, the company started marketing the soda to "weight-conscious" housewives. It thus took off in popularity, until the company was worth millions.

Ray Distributors, owned and operated by Arthur Raphael, was the sole distributor of No-Cal soda on Long Island from the early 1950s till his death in 1967. Mr. Raphael, a salesman for Kirsch before Hyman and Morris Kirsch gave him the opportunity to bring No-Cal to Nassau and Suffolk counties, was also instrumental in introducing No-Cal as a fountain drink.

== Advertising ==
No-Cal used up-and-coming Hollywood starlets, such as Kim Novak and Julie Adams, in its print ads. Cartoonist Stan Goldberg did the advertising art for a billboard in Times Square. Actor Jack Gilford was the No-Cal Genie in television and print ads.

== Decline ==
As major soda producers such as The Coca-Cola Company and PepsiCo launched their own diet brands in the 1960s, No-Cal found it hard to compete. This, coupled with the Food and Drug Administration's ban of cyclamate sweeteners from all U.S. food and drug products in October 1970, caused No-Cal to lose market share and slowly disappear.
