= Ondioline =

Electronic keyboard instrument

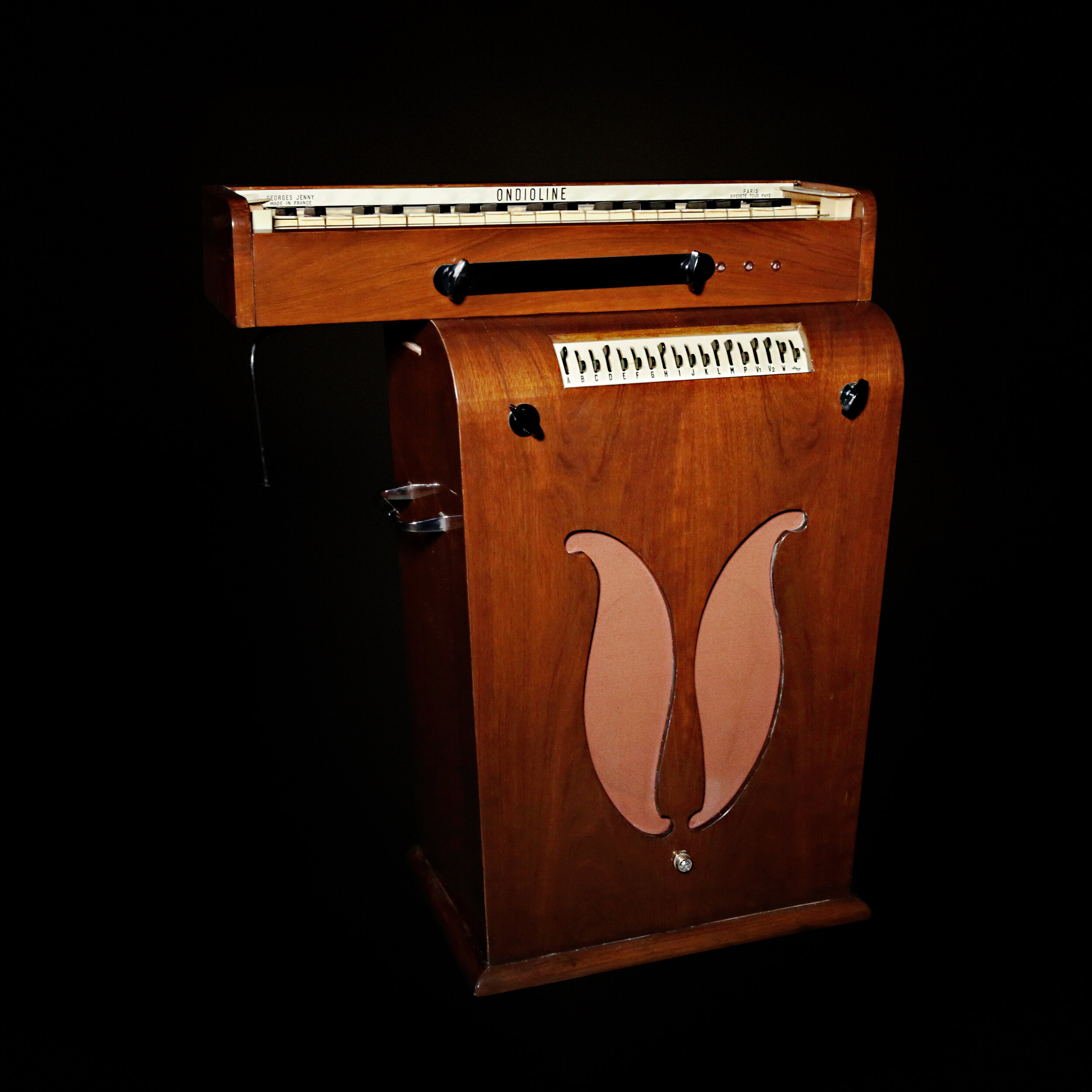
Ondioline - Classic Model, early 1950s - early 1960s

The Ondioline is an electronic analog synthesizer, developed and built by Frenchman Georges Jenny. Sometimes referred to as the "Jenny Ondioline", the instrument is considered a forerunner of the synthesizer. First conceived by Jenny in 1939, he continued refining and reconfiguring the device, producing dozens of variant models up until his death in 1975.

Though monophonic, the Ondioline is capable of creating a wide variety of sounds. Its keyboard spans three octaves, but by adjusting a register knob a player can render up to eight octaves. The instrument's keyboard is suspended on custom-designed springs, which enables a natural vibrato if the player manipulates a key laterally (from side to side) as that key is depressed. The keyboard is pressure-sensitive, and volume is controlled by a knee lever.

The foremost exponent and popularizer of the instrument was Jean-Jacques Perrey, who performed and recorded with it, composed for it, and served as the instrument's first salesman on behalf of Jenny. Perrey even recorded under the pseudonym "Mr. Ondioline."

It is estimated that around 1,200 Ondiolines were constructed between the mid-1940s and the late-1960s, most handmade by Jenny himself. According to Ondioline authority/historian Wally De Backer, "The instrument was also offered in 'kit' form, where Jenny recommended purchasing the more complex assemblies – such as the keyboard – as complete units. The schematics were made available for amateur engineers to construct their own custom instruments, and they were encouraged to experiment with the amplifier, tone circuits and cabinetry."

== Development of the instrument ==
Jenny began constructing a first prototype around 1939 (the instrument was as yet unnamed) while recovering from tuberculosis at a sanatorium in the south of France. The instrument functioned on a valve-based system and contained a built-in amplifier. In 1946, Jenny's working model took first prize in the inventions competition at the Foire de Paris (Paris Fair).

By the time Jenny began to manufacture the device commercially in 1947 he had settled on the name "Ondioline." As a cost-saving measure — in order to reduce the instrument's retail price — Jenny often used low quality parts; as a result, the instruments required regular maintenance or they would become unplayable.

For decades Jenny redesigned and manufactured new versions of the instrument at his Paris company, Les Ondes Sonores Jenny (later known as La Musique Electronique). Later models offered such options as automatic vibrato and tremolo. There is no single standard model of the instrument.

Jenny declined to license the instrument for mass production.

== Works for Ondioline ==
Perrey claimed that serious works for the Ondioline were composed by Arthur Honegger and Darius Milhaud. According to a 1957 promotional brochure published by Jenny, works had been composed for the instrument by Honneger, Milhaud, Georges Auric, Joseph Kosma, Wanda Landowska, and Marcel Delannoy.

A 1958 LP from the French Broadcasting System featured six new works composed for the Ondioline: Maurice Bagot's Suite Op.59 (for 3 Ondiolines); Gustave Samazeuilh's Musette (for Ondioline); Darius Cittanova's Chants Pour Les Eternites Differentes (for Ondioline); Jacques Chailley's Angelique (for Ondioline) and Ballet Divertissement (for Ondioline); and Jacques Castérède's Eolus (for Ondioline).

== Comparison with the Ondes Martenot ==
The Ondioline's keyboard is modeled after another early electronic instrument from France, the Ondes Martenot, which was invented in 1928 by Maurice Martenot. Jenny conceived his instrument as a low-cost alternative to the Martenot, which was more sophisticated in construction and more expensive. The Martenot was used mostly in serious music, but Jenny devised the Ondioline for a broader consumer market, including pop music.

Joseph A. Paradiso, writing in the publication New Music Box, said that both the Martenot and the Ondioline "were truly dexterous performance instruments, as they sported several continuous and discrete controllers that could be articulated by the left hand and knee while the right hand played a melody."

The Ondioline is more sonically versatile than the Martenot, which is stylistically limited. The Ondioline has a filter panel, offering from 10 to 17 sliders (depending on the model — 10 on earlier models, 17 on later ones) to modify the tones. Used in combination, these switches can create sounds ranging from near-accurate recreations of symphonic instruments (e.g., oboe, French horn) to unique sounds which do not mimic existing instruments. While the Martenot has a ring (or ribbon) controller to control pitch, the Ondioline has a wire strip that when pressed provides percussion effects.

Both the Martenot and the Ondioline use vacuum tube circuitry. However, unlike the Martenot, whose oscillator is based on theremin principles (two ultra-high frequencies beating against each other, to produce a third audible frequency), the Ondioline uses a multivibrator oscillator circuit to produce its tone. This gives the Ondioline a tone with richer harmonics than the Martenot. Perrey explained the instrument's technical advantages.

The Ondioline is based on a multivibrator oscillator circuit, producing a pulse-like waveform that is fed through a series of discrete filters. These filters, the switching controls, and the continuous analog controllers are the key to the tremendous variety of timbres obtainable with the Ondioline. When I first saw the instrument, I knew immediately its potential in comparison with the Ondes Martenot, which offers only four or five timbres.

The Ondioline was designed to be portable, and is smaller than a Martenot. Its retail price at the time was US$500 (US$8,561.42 in 2017 dollars), far less than the cost of the Martenot.

== Use in popular music ==
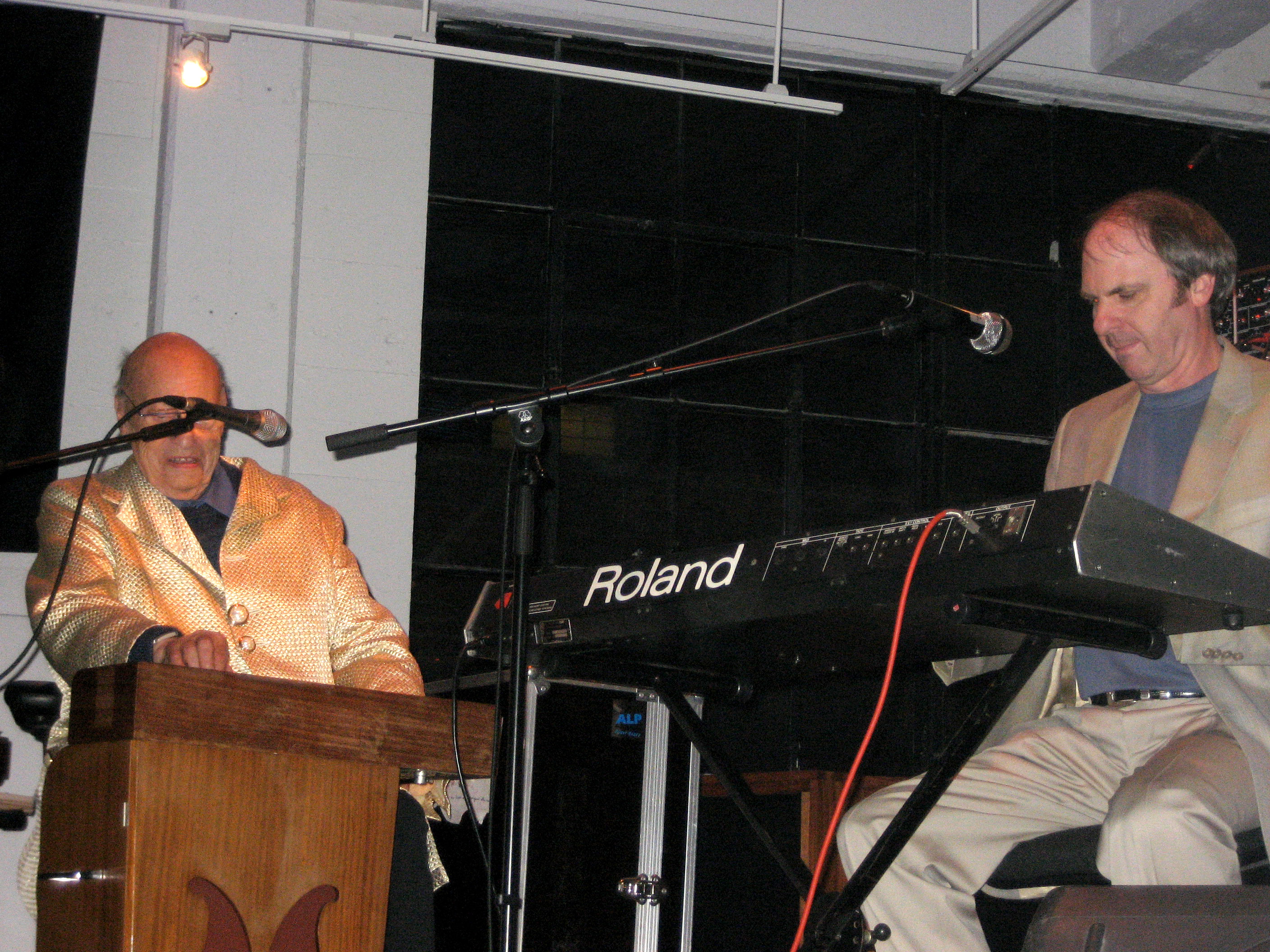
Perrey playing the ondioline in 2006

In 1951, French composer/singer Charles Trenet heard about Perrey and the Ondioline, and invited him to provide accompaniment on the recording of Trenet's song "L'ame des Poetes" ("The Soul of Poets"). The song became a commercial success, and Perrey accompanied Trenet at concerts.

Composer Juan García Esquivel used an Ondioline in 1959 on the recording "Watchamacallit," from his album Exploring New Sounds in Hi-Fi (RCA).

The first American hit record to feature the Ondioline was "More", by Kai Winding, in 1963. This instrumental version of the theme from the 1962 film Mondo Cane was arranged and conducted by Claus Ogerman, with the Ondioline played by Perrey (who had by then moved to New York).

The instrument is used in a percussive fashion on the 1964 Terry Stafford hit "Suspicion." (The player was not identified.)

In the late 1960s, rock musician/keyboardist Al Kooper featured the Ondioline on several tracks he recorded with his bands the Blues Project and Blood, Sweat & Tears; he continued to perform and record with the instrument in his early solo career. Notable examples are "I Can't Keep from Crying Sometimes" and "Steve's Song" from the 1966 Blues Project album Projections, and "No Time Like the Right Time" (The Blues Project Live at Town Hall, 1967); "Meagan's Gypsy Eyes" from Blood Sweat & Tears' Child Is Father to the Man (1968); "His Holy Modal Majesty" with Mike Bloomfield on Super Session (1968); "Her Holy Modal Highness" from the album The Live Adventures of Mike Bloomfield and Al Kooper (1968); and Kooper's first solo album, I Stand Alone (1969).

Tommy James and the Shondells' 1967 hits "I Think We're Alone Now" and "Mirage" featured Ondioline, played by session keyboardist Artie Butler.

Motown Records used an Ondioline as part of their studio setup between 1959 and 1962, where it was mainly used in place of expensive string arrangements. The instrument is featured prominently on dozens of early Motown recordings by acts such as the Supremes, the Miracles, the Temptations and the Marvelettes, notably the songs "After All", "I Want a Guy", and "(You're My) Dream Come True", on which it was played by Raynoma Liles Gordy.

The first use of the instrument in a film was in 1959, when Perrey played it in the soundtrack of the French film La Vache et le Prisonnier (The Cow and the Prisoner). The Ondioline was also used in the soundtrack of the 1960 film Spartacus.

== Ongoing legacy and preservation ==
Jean-Jacques Perrey continued to perform live shows with the Ondioline until his death in 2016; he featured the instrument on his collaborative albums with musician Dana Countryman, The Happy Electropop Music Machine (2006) and Destination Space (2008), both issued on the Oglio label.

Shortly after Perrey's death in November 2016, Australian musician Wally De Backer, also known as Gotye, launched a new record label, Forgotten Futures, whose first release, Jean-Jacques Perrey Et Son Ondioline, was an LP of previously unreleased recordings of Perrey playing Ondioline. De Backer had befriended Perrey during the artist's long terminal illness and acquired the recordings from Perrey's private collection. "We got to know each other over a number of visits," said De Backer, "and through the time I spent with him in his apartment in Lausanne in Switzerland, he and his daughter Patricia started to produce all sorts of ... interesting early recordings that hadn’t been released — test pressings, alternative arrangements of things that are better known in his work. As I started to listen to these things, over time I realized this whole collection of stuff that he never really put out is amongst his best work." Among the tracks were collaborations with Dick Hyman and Angelo Badalamenti.

De Backer began acquiring Ondiolines and having them restored to working condition. In 2016 he assembled a group called the Ondioline Orchestra, with whom he performed on the instrument. The first such concert was a posthumous tribute to Perrey, at National Sawdust in Brooklyn, New York.

In a 2018 interview with Australia's Broadsheet, Gotye said, “You can dial in an incredibly wide range of sounds on the ondioline, and the unique mechanics for playing it allows you to create sounds very sensitively and with a musical deftness I just feel isn't present on most other electronic instruments from the '40s – or decades since."

In 2022, De Backer launched a comprehensive website, Ondioline.com, devoted to the instrument and its history.

In October 2022, Spitfire Audio released a virtual recreation of the Ondioline, called Electronic Antique, as part of their free LABS plugin.

== See also ==
- Clavioline
- List of electronic instruments
- Synthesizer#Monophonic electronic keyboards
