= Vacaciones en Acapulco (El Chavo del Ocho) =

1977 three-episode saga of El Chavo del Ocho

- El Chavo del Ocho episodes
- Episode nos.: Season 5 Episodes 15-17
- Directed by: Roberto Gómez Bolaños
- Teleplay by: Roberto Gómez Bolaños
- Original air date: May 30, 1977 – June 13, 1977
- Running time: 30 minutes per episode

Episode chronology
← Previous "Don Ramón carpintero (second part)"	Next → "El álbum de estampitas"

"Vacaciones en Acapulco" (Portuguese: Chaves em Acapulco, Vamos Todos a Acapulco or Os Farofeiros; English: Vacations in Acapulco or Acapulco Vacations) is a three-episode saga from the fifth season of the Mexican television sitcom series El Chavo del Ocho. The episodes aired between May 30, June 6 and 13, 1977, being both written and directed by Roberto Gómez Bolaños, it originally aired on Televisa's Canal 2. The saga stars the entire neighborhood going to Acapulco, with disagreements and confusion at the hotel and on the beach there.

The saga was remade as the twenty-sixth episode of the first season of El Chavo Animado on May 24, 2007, adapting the last two episodes into a single episode, but without the presence of the song "Buenas Noches, Vecindad".

== Plot ==
=== Part 1 ===
It all begins when Professor Jirafales goes to Don Ramón's house, having confiscated a silver-cleaning liquid from La Chilindrina. Professor Jirafales tells her that he suspects Chilindrina stole it. This suspicion increases when Don Ramón notices that a $20 bill has disappeared from his desk. Later, Chilindrina tells her father that she actually took the money to buy the silver-cleaning liquid, as the product was being raffled off.

Chilindrina won the raffle and, as a prize, takes her father, Don Ramón, to Acapulco. Doña Florinda, offended that the mob is going to Acapulco, decides to go with Quico and Professor Jirafales. Doña Clotilde decides to go with Don Ramón to Acapulco, so, in the end, El Chavo is left alone in the neighborhood. Señor Barriga arrives at the neighborhood to collect the rent and after learning that no one is there and that everyone went to Acapulco, he also decides to leave and take Chavo to his favorite hotel in Acapulco, making Chavo happy.

=== Part 2 ===
All the residents of the neighborhood are heading to Acapulco after Don Ramón and Chilindrina win an all-expenses-paid trip. El Chavo has breakfast with his neighbors, but accidents occur at the table. And it doesn't take long for everyone to start getting confused in the place, mainly around the pool.

=== Part 3 ===
Confusion continues to engulf the entire neighborhood at the hotel in Acapulco, especially when adults believe the children are drowning, since the latter were practicing diving in the pool there. After all this confusion at the hotel, the entire neighborhood gathers on the Acapulco beach with a bonfire lit at dusk, while Chavo sings the famous song "Buenas Noches, Vecindad" and bids everyone good night.

== Cast ==
- Roberto Mario Gómez Bolaños as El Chavo
- Carlos Villagrán as Quico
- Ramón Valdés as Don Ramón
- Florinda Meza as Doña Florinda
- Rubén Aguirre as Professor Jirafales
- Angelines Fernández as Doña Clotilde
- Édgar Vivar as Señor Barriga
- María Antonieta de las Nieves as La Chilindrina
- Horacio Gómez Bolaños as the waiter at the Acapulco hotel

In this same saga, the character Ñoño (who was also played by Édgar Vivar) was only mentioned by Señor Barriga, without appearing in it.

== Production ==
According to official production records, during this same Acapulco saga, the crew and cast spent about two weeks filming content for El Chavo del Ocho and also El Chapulín Colorado, the series about Chespirito's Mexican hero. The hotel where they were staying authorized the filming, but continued to operate normally every day. Therefore, few people know that during this time, there were many curious guests who were confused about what was going on. Interestingly, these other guests served as extras for the series. Research conducted by fans indicates that no one interfered with the dialogue, especially since most of those present were foreigners and did not know the series in their respective countries. The same hotel that served as a set for Televisa in the 1970s is still in operation today, but with some minor changes.

== Reception ==
The saga is considered a cult classic among Chespirito fans, including in Brazil. However, in that same country, the public only saw Chavo and his gang in Acapulco in 1991, considering that the first part premiered in 1988 and only years later did SBT present the rest of the saga to Brazilian viewers. The song "Buenas Noches, Vecindad", sung by Chaves at the end of the third part of this saga, became quite famous and to this day many people believe that it was a song composed to say goodbye to actor Carlos Villagrán, who played Quico, who left the series in its last seasons. But this is not true, mainly because Villagrán only left the series in 1979, while the Acapulco saga was originally shown in the middle of the 1977 season.

The classic Brazilian dubbing of the series El Chavo del Ocho was done by Estúdio Maga, led by Marcelo Gastaldi, who lent his voice to the protagonist at the time. In Brazil, when the second episode of the same saga in Acapulco was shown, viewers noticed that Acapulco had been transformed, in the dubbing, into Guarujá, a city on the coast of São Paulo. According to Marcus Fornicola, who was responsible for translating most of the episodes of the series for the studio in question during that period, in an interview with the YouTube channel "Vila do Chaves", the idea was to get closer to the Brazilian public, who would never have heard of Acapulco beach. “I adapted the text according to what was said and they [the studio producers] laughed when I handed them the tapes. They really liked the adaptations I made”, he revealed.
