= En el Cine =

- El Chavo del Ocho episode
- Episode no.: Season 7 Episode 1
- Directed by: Roberto Gómez Bolaños
- Written by: Roberto Gómez Bolaños
- Original air date: January 29, 1979
- Running time: 30 minutes

Episode chronology
← Previous "Todavía no es Hora de Clases"	Next → "El foco"

"En el Cine" (Brazilian Portuguese: Vamos ao Cinema? or Vamos ao Cinema; English: At the Cinema or In the Theater) is the first episode of the seventh season of the Mexican television sitcom series El Chavo del Ocho. Both written and directed by Roberto Gómez Bolaños, the episode originally aired on Televisa's Canal 2 on January 29, 1979. In the episode, everyone in the neighborhood goes to the movies, but they end up causing a commotion there. This is the first episode without Carlos Villagrán in the cast, as he left the series after the sixth season.

== Plot ==
Don Ramón is very worried as the night comes and he can't find La Chilindrina anywhere. Doña Clotilde appears and tries to comfort him, but makes him more nervous saying that something serious might have occurred. She hugs Don Ramón just as Chilindrina and Chavo walk in on them. Chilindrina explains that they went to watch El Chanfle in the movies, invited by Doña Florinda, who tells that her son Quico went to live with his rich godmother to receive a better education. The following day, Doña Clotilde invites Don Ramón and Chilindrina to the movies. So does Profesor Jirafales with Doña Florinda, leaving El Chavo alone in the neighborhood. Señor Barriga arrives to collect the rents, but decides to go the movies as well when Chavo tells him everyone went out. Señor Barriga stops, and realizing that Chavo is alone, invites him to the movies, to which the boy happily accepts. Upon arriving at the cinema, several seat exchanges in the dark begin between Chilindrina, Chavo, Don Ramón and Profesor Jirafales, annoying the other moviegoers. When they finally find their seats, Chavo blocks Chilindrina's view, causing her to push him onto Señor Barriga. After another brief moment of peace, El Chavo repeatedly says that they should've gone watch El Chanfle, causing a big discussion between the main cast and complaints from everyone else. The next day, Don Ramón takes Chilindrina and Chavo again to the movies to watch El Chanfle.

== Production ==
After Carlos Villagrán left the series to star a TV show of his own, Chespirito decided that the best motive to write Quico off would be to say that he moved away. Villagrán he remained in the cast until the end of the sixth season in 1978. To this day, the real reasons for the actor's departure are discussed. Some of the most famous reasons are that Villagrán and Bolaños allegedly fought over the copyrights of the former's character, Quico. Or probably both actors had a healthy farewell and no grudges towards one another as Villagrán had been invited to star in five shows in Venezuela, something that later was followed by the departure of Ramón Valdés from the cast of El Chavo del Ocho as well.

In the Brazilian dub, Chavo repeatedly says: "Teria sido melhor ir ver o Pelé" (English: "It would've been better to see [the] Pelé [movie]"). The line has become very popular in Brazil, and has become a part of popular culture in there. In the original Spanish version, he says: "Mejor hubiéramos ido a ver El Chanfle" ("We should’ve gone to watch (the movie) El Chanfle"), to everyone’s annoyance. The movie the cast goes to watch is Bolaños' creation, El Chanfle. Unlike most of the episodes of the series, En el Cine has not been remade.

== Cast ==
- Roberto Gómez Bolaños as El Chavo
- María Antonieta de las Nieves as La Chilindrina
- Florinda Meza as Doña Florinda
- Rubén Aguirre as Profesor Jirafales
- Angelines Fernández as Doña Clotilde
- Édgar Vivar as Señor Barriga
- Ramón Valdés as Don Ramón
