= Jaimito the Mailman =

Mexican sitcom character

- El Chavo del Ocho character
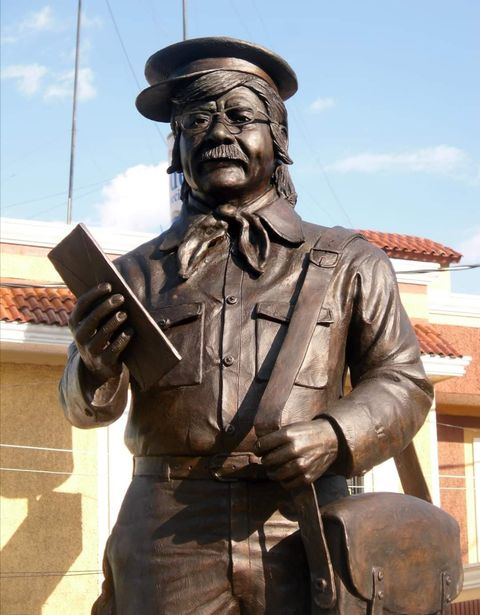
- Statue of Jaimito the Mailman in Tangamandapio
- First appearance: 1979; 2006 (animated series)
- Last appearance: 1992; 2014 (animated series)
- Created by: Roberto Gómez Bolaños
- Portrayed by: Raúl Padilla
- Voiced by: Leonardo García and Héctor Miranda (El Chavo Animado); Dave Mallow (El Chavo Animado; English dub); Waldir Fiori and Glauco Marques (El Chavo Animado; Brazilian Portuguese dub) (Note: García voiced Jaimito between seasons 1 and 6 of the animated series while Miranda took over from season 6. In the Brazilian dubbing, actor Waldir Fiori voiced the character between seasons 1 and 5, with Glauco Marques taking over from season 5.)
- Motion capture: Óscar Narváez

In-universe information
- Species: Human
- Gender: Male
- Occupation: Mailman
- Nationality: Mexican

Jaimito the Mailman (Spanish: Jaimito el cartero), also known in English as Manny the Mailman, and whose real name is Jaime Garabito, is a fictional character of the Mexican television sitcom series El Chavo del Ocho. A native of Tangamandapio, a small town in the state of Michoacán, Jaimito is an elderly and lazy man who works as a mailman delivering notifications and letters in Mexico City. His lack of motivation in his work and his allegations that fatigue affects him result in Jaimito being deeply involved with the neighbours of the vecindad.

The character is portrayed by actor Raúl Padilla.

== Concept and creation ==
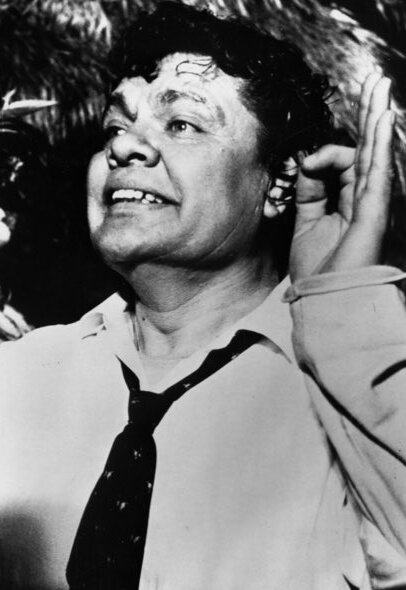
Actor Raúl Padilla portrayed Jaimito the Mailman

Padilla was a native of Monterrey and had taken up acting more as an imposition than his own choice, according to what he told the media once. His family had a long history with arts and the world of acting, especially his father, Juan, who owned a theatre company. In the 1960s, Padilla began a successful career within Mexican cinema during its Golden Age and in television, working in numerous productions that decade and in the following years. He met Roberto Gómez Bolaños in 1979, while taking part in El Chanfle and El Chapulín Colorado, both works by Gómez Bolaños.

After the departure of actors Carlos Villagrán and Ramón Valdés from El Chavo in 1978, Jaimito took over a compensating role in their place beginning in 1979 and spanning through the end of the programme in 1992. Padilla had worked with Villagrán before but got to know Gómez Bolaños through the connection in El Chapulín.

Jaimito misses the 1981 season only, as Valdés briefly returned in the character of Don Ramón. After Valdés indefinitely abandoned El Chavo the following year, Jaimito returned and remained in his place until the conclusion of the series.

== Characterisation ==
Jaimito is an elderly man who is always tired or, as he prefers to say, in a state of fatigue that he cannot help. Clad in an all-grey uniform, a peaked grey cap and a neck scarf, Jaimito additionally carries a large brown bag stuffed with letters. He also carries a bicycle that the post service gave him as a condition for the delivery of the notifications; however, Jaimito lied to them in order to preserve his job given that he never learned to ride on a bicycle.

He is a native of the small town of Tangamandapio, Michoacán, a place that he describes in beautiful and idealistic words in a trance-like state, just to receive scoffing and frustration from the other characters. Jaimito is deeply cherished by El Chavo del Ocho, regardless of common altercations, mainly due to El Chavo's clumsiness and mischievous behaviour. On the other hand, he is despised by Doña Florinda, who accuses him of being slow in delivering correspondence, while another character, Doña Clotilde tends to show mixed feelings for Jaimito.

Jaimito has a main catchphrase that he uses to say that he cannot help or evade fatigue, a response he gives whenever other characters reproach his lack of motivation in his work. For that reason as well as for his fixation with Tangamandapio and how life is supposedly much better there, Jaimito is the subject of mockery and insults from children and adults alike, especially from Professor Jirafales, who treats him as an illiterate old man.

== Costume ==
Jaimito walks with difficulty and always seems to be out of oxygen. His attitude in handing over his bag for the other characters to search for their own letter draws backlash from Doña Florinda and Doña Clotilde, as well as from Doña Nieves, the great-grandmother of La Chilindrina. This unkempt personality matches with his outfit, made of all-grey clothing, from a peaked cap to a shirt and saggy pants, additionally having a belt around his waist. Jaimito has a big and bushy white and grey moustache, a neck scarf, and wears rundown glasses, always posed on the bridge of his nose.

His big brown bag is always overloaded with letters; he carries it crossed across his chest or resting on his bike. Since Jaimito does not know how to use a bicycle, he walks beside it, saying that he has suffered painful falls while trying to master the technique of riding them.

== Other appearances ==
As other characters from El Chavo, Jaimito has appeared in other related series, including sketches of Chespirito and films like El Chanfle and El Chanfle 2. He was also featured in segments of Doctor Chapatín and El Chapulín Colorado. In the 1995 short novel by Gómez Bolaños, El diario del Chavo del Ocho, Jaimito is a main character interacting with all other neighbours, including Quico and Don Ramón, two characters that he did not get to know in the TV series.

Jaimito is voiced by Leonardo García in El Chavo Animado and by Dave Mallow in the English dubbing, where he is known as Manny the Mailman.

Jaimito is portrayed by actor Óscar Narváez in the 2025 HBO Max series Chespirito: Not Really on Purpose.

== Aftermath ==
Padilla died on 3 February 1994 in Mexico City as a result of diabetes. His death occurred while he was recording a programme with Gómez Bolaños, who found him dead on the set. He was 75.

On 25 July 2012, municipal leader of Tangamandapio, Juan Campos González, inaugurated a bronze statue in honour of Jaimito the Mailman. González praised the legacy of Padilla's acting as Jaimito, saying that Tangamandapio became internationally known as a place of red-glowing twilights thanks to Padilla's work.
