= Street Chaves =

2003 video game

- Title screen, showing a reference to Street Fighter II.
- Developer: CyberGamba
- Publisher: CyberGamba
- Series: El Chavo del Ocho and Street Fighter (unofficially)
- Platform: Windows
- Release: 2003
- Genre: Fighting

Street Chaves is a 2003 fighting game developed for Windows. It is an unofficial game based on the 70s Mexican series El Chavo del Ocho, satirizing popular old-school fighting games like Street Fighter. The game was developed by the independent Brazilian developer CyberGamba from São Paulo.

== Development ==
The game was developed by CyberGamba and his team, without exposing his identity to avoid copyright issues. According to CyberGamba, he initially started with a project he personally did creating a fighting game involving digitized photos of him and his friends in a similar way to Mortal Kombat. He later became interested in making a version of the same game using characters from El Chavo del Ocho using photographs taken from the live-action series. The game started just for fun, with at first only Chavo, Don Ramón and Chilindrina playable, but his friends liked it so much that they influenced him to continue with the game project and create a page to post in on internet. The game also includes songs from the Brazilian LP released in 1989 as part of the soundtrack.

== Gameplay ==
The game's gameplay mostly references several 90s fighting games with mechanics that consist of the player controlling the character and attacking the opponent with punches, kicks and special attacks until ending the opponent's life bar. Regardless of the character chosen, the player will face 8 fights with random characters; at the end of the game there is a cutscene that varies between each character, showing them facing their rival usually based on specific episode events of the live-action series.

=== Playable characters ===
The game features 15 playable characters, each with their own combat abilities. Each character has a moveset inspired by characters from classic fighting games like Street Fighter, Art of Fighting, Darkstalkers and The King of Fighters, from companies like Capcom and SNK.

- El Chavo
- Don Ramón
- La Chilindrina
- Quico
- Doña Florinda
- Professor Jirafales
- Sr. Barriga
- La Bruja del 71
- Paty
- Ñoño
- Godínez
- Sr. Hurtado
- Jaimito, el cartero
- Doña Nieves
- Glória

== Reception ==
The game is known for being a cult classic among the El Chavo del Ocho fandom during the 2000s. Street Chaves was well publicized by fans at the time of its release; for being a free game, it was made available for download not only on the developer's website, but on many other websites on the Internet. The game's success led to CyberGamba creating more games inspired by El Chavo del Ocho satirizing other classic games like Super Magro World, Madruga Craft, Codename Madruga, Chapolin & Super Sam: A Lenda dos Heróis, and others. A 3D sequel to the game titled Chaves Arena was projected, but was canceled with only the beta version of the game available with Chavo and Don Ramón playable.

In 2022 an unofficial port of the game for Sega Mega Drive was made by a different programmer under the title Street Chaves II, including new content like El Chapulín Colorado as one of the new fighters.
