= Chespirito: Not Really on Purpose =

TV series based on life and biography of Chespirito

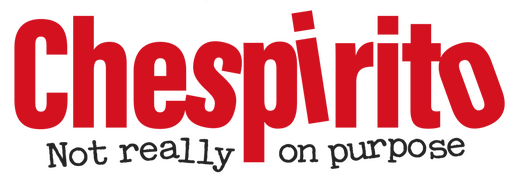
- Spanish: Chespirito: Sin querer queriendo
- Genre: Biographical
- Created by: Roberto Gómez Fernández
- Written by: Roberto Gómez Fernández; Paulina Gómez Fernández
- Directed by: Rodrigo Santos; Julián de Tavira; David "Leche" Ruíz
- Starring: Pablo Cruz Guerrero
- Composer: Camilo Froideval
- Country of origin: Mexico
- Original language: Spanish
- No. of seasons: 1
- No. of episodes: 8

Production
- Executive producers: Mariano Cesar; Anouk Aaron; Vanessa Miranda; Bruce Boren; Ricardo Costianovsky; Tomás Darcyl; Alexis Fridman; Julián De Tavira; Héctor Villegas; Viridiana Torres
- Producers: Roberto Gómez Fernández; Paulina Gómez Fernández
- Cinematography: Marc Bellver; Diana Garay
- Editor: Sam Baixauli
- Running time: 43–48 minutes
- Production companies: Grupo Chespirito; THR3 Media Group; Perro Azul

Original release
- Network: Max
- Release: 5 June – 3 July 2025
- Network: HBO Max
- Release: 10 July – 24 July 2025

Chespirito: Not Really on Purpose (Spanish: Chespirito: Sin querer queriendo) is a Mexican biographical television series created by Roberto Gómez Fernández. The series is based on the life of actor, comedian and producer Roberto Gómez Bolaños, Gómez Fernández's father. It was broadcast on Max from 5 June 2025 to 24 July 2025.

== Cast ==
- Pablo Cruz Guerrero as Roberto Gómez Bolaños
  - Iván Aragón as young Roberto
  - Dante Aguiar as child Roberto
- Ilian Emilio Gallea Ballesteros as Roberto Gómez Fernández
- Barbara López as Margarita Ruíz
- Andrea Noli as Angelines Fernández
- Miguel Islas as Ramón Valdés
- Eugenio Bartilotti as Édgar Vivar
- Jorge Luis Moreno as Horacio Gómez
- Arturo Barba as Rubén Aguirre
- Paulina Dávila as Graciela Fernández
  - Macarena García as young Graciela
- Juan Lecanda as Marcos Barragán
- Paola Montes de Oca as María Antonieta de las Nieves
- Jesusa Ochoa as Graciela Gómez
- Nina Rubín as Marcela Gómez Fernandez
- Édgar Vivar as Agustín Delgado
- Karina Gidi as Elsa Bolaños
- Rolando Breme as Mariano Cassasola
- Sebastián Moncayo as Ernesto Figueras
- María Antonieta de las Nieves as Nancy
- Óscar Narváez as Raúl "Chato" Padilla

== Production ==
After the death of Roberto Gómez Bolaños in 2014, rumors surfaced that the comedian's life would be depicted in a film or series. At first, Bolaños' son, Roberto Gómez Fernández, ruled out the possibility. However, in April 2018, Fernández reversed his decision and officially announced a television series based on his father's life.

Production of the series was initially scheduled for 2019, but was postponed several times while Fernández sought information for the project. The series was expected to be produced by Televisa, but in 2019 the network suspended production of the series due to scheduling conflicts. After that, Fernández decided not produce the series at Televisa and sought another production company. That same year, THR3 Media Group announced it would produce a series about Bolaños' life. At the end of the year, Fernández said that production could begin in 2020 and that the series would show Bolaños in all his aspects, including the not-so-good things about him. In 2020, the project was again postponed due to the COVID-19 pandemic. Nevertheless, Fernandez said he expedited the search for information for the series, despite the pandemic.

In May 2023, it was announced that HBO Max would release the series following a partnership between Warner Bros. Discovery and THR3 Media Group, which includes other Chespirito Media Universe projects. In February 2024, Pablo Cruz Guerrero was cast as Roberto Gómez Bolaños. That same month, filming of the series began in Acapulco.

Édgar Vivar, who starred as Señor Barriga in El Chavo del Ocho, contributed by providing information about Bolaños' life and behind the scenes of the series. He was also cast in the role of Agustín P. Delgado, the film director who gave Bolaños the nickname "Chespirito". María Antonieta de las Nieves, who played La Chilindrina in El Chavo del Ocho, also participated in the production. Carlos Villagrán, who played Quico in the series, did not participate in the project. Actress Florinda Meza, widow of Bolaños, said that the production was using information about her without authorization and that she had also heard on good authority that she would be portrayed in an offensive way in the series, which she does not approve of. Meza also published an open letter in which she said that, despite everything, she was not against the production of the series and that she hoped that an agreement would be reached. The producers managed to reach an agreement with the actress, in which it was decided that in the series her name would be changed to Margarita Ruiz. Carlos Villagrán, who had a dispute with Bolaños, was also renamed in the series as Marcos Barragán.

== Episodes ==
No.	Title	Original release date
1	"Cobbler, Stick to Thy Last" (Zapatero a tus zapatos)	5 June 2025
2	"Every Cloud Has a Silver Lining" (No hay mal que por bien no venga)	12 June 2025
3	"Don't Get Your 'Reathers Fuffled!" (Que no panda el cúnico)	19 June 2025
4	"It's Just That You Have No Patience for Me" (Es que no me tienen paciencia)	26 June 2025
5	"He Who Laughs Last..." (El que ríe al último)	3 July 2025
6	"The Price of Fame" (El precio de la fama)	10 July 2025
7	"On the Fence" (Con melón o con sandía)	17 July 2025
8	"It Was Worth It" (Valió la pena)	24 July 2025

== Release ==
On 23 January 2025, Max released the first teaser trailer, unveiling the looks of the actors who play the characters of El Chavo del Ocho. At the end, Roberto Gómez Bolaños, played by Pablo Cruz Guerrero, is shown putting on his makeup to bring El Chavo to life. The series premiered on 5 June 2025.
