= El Chavo (disambiguation) =

El Chavo ("The Kid" or "The Boy") is a Mexican TV series aired between 1973 and 1980 originally titled of El Chavo del Ocho.

El Chavo may also refer to:

- El Chavo Animado
- El Chavo del Ocho (character)
- El Chavo (video game)

== See also ==
- Chavo (disambiguation)
