= La dueña =

La dueña (The owner (female) or The Chairwoman) may refer to:

- La dueña (Venezuelan TV series), 1984
- La dueña (Argentine TV series), 2012
- La dueña (1966 Mexican TV series), a Mexican telenovela
- La Dueña (1995 Mexican TV series), a Mexican telenovela
