= Las gemelas =

Las gemelas may refer to:

- Las gemelas (1961 telenovela)
- The Twin Girls, a 1963 Spanish film
- Las gemelas (1972 telenovela)
