= De la tierra a la luna =

- Genre: Telenovela
- Country of origin: Mexico
- Original language: Spanish

Original release
- Network: Telesistema Mexicano

De la tierra a la luna, is a 1969 Mexican telenovela produced by Televisa and originally transmitted by Telesistema Mexicano.

== Cast ==
- Guillermo Orea
- Rafael Llamas
- Luis Gimeno
- Carlos Ancira
