= Tangamandapio =

Santiago Tangamandapio
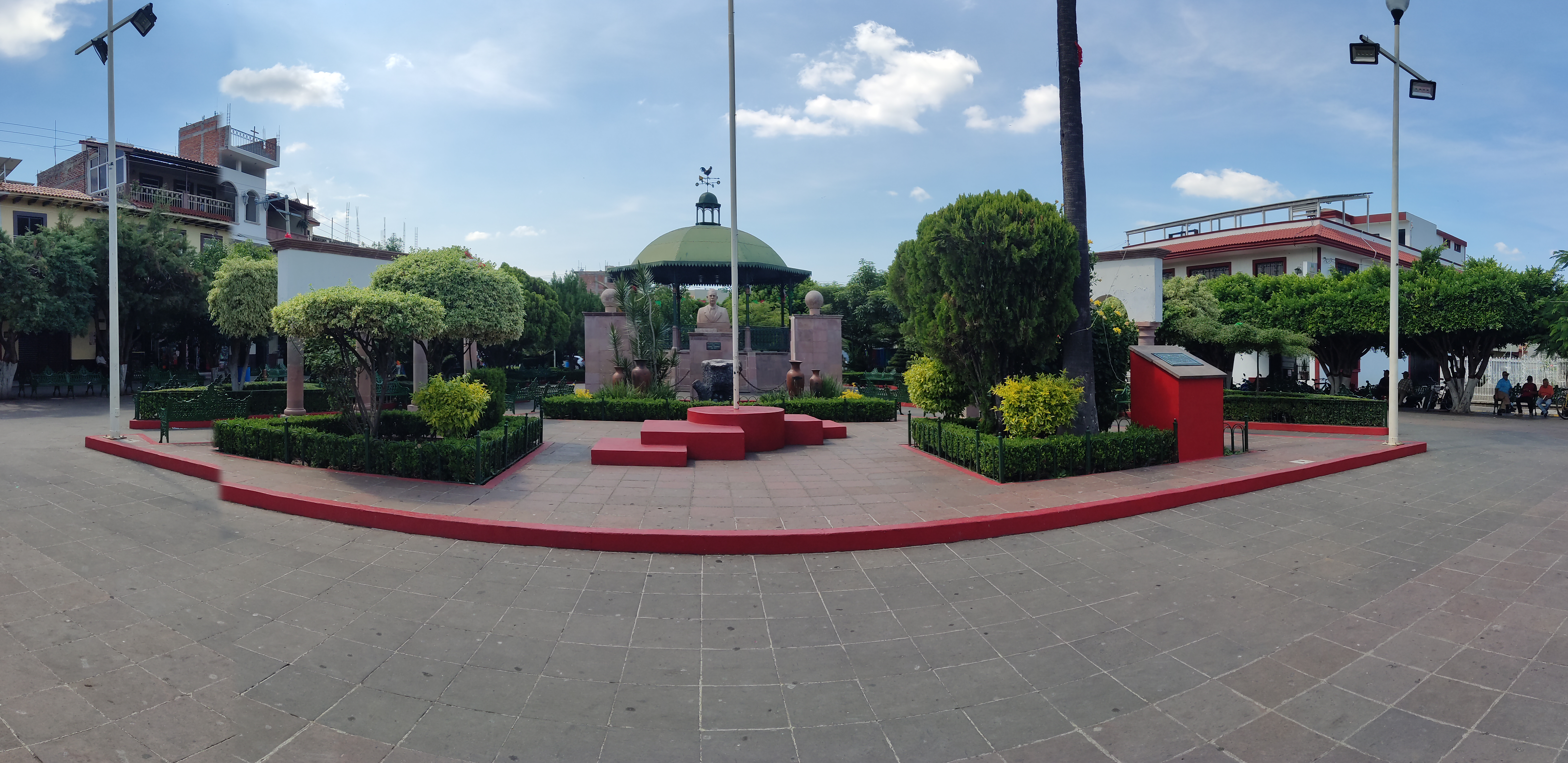
- Tangamandapio, Michoacán

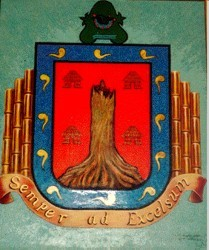
- Coat of arms
- Motto: Semper Ad Excelsium (in English:Always to the Highest)
- Location within Mexico
- Coordinates: 19°57′23″N 102°25′58″W
- Country: Mexico
- State: Michoacán
- Foundation: December 10, 1831
- Elevation: 1,658 m (5,440 ft)

Population (2020)
  - Total: 11,086
  - Municipality: 31,716
- Time zone: UTC-6 (Central Standard Time)
- Postal code: 59920

Santiago Tangamandapio, known as Tangamandapio, is a municipality in the Mexican state of Michoacán. It is located 165 km from the state capital of Morelia. The geographic coordinates are: 19° 57' North latitude and 102° 26' West longitude. Tangamandapio Municipality also includes the community of Tarécuato.

== Popular culture ==
The municipality gained notoriety due to the Mexican television series El Chavo del Ocho (1973–80), in which the character Jaimito the Mailman (portrayed by Raúl Padilla) cites Tangamandapio as his birthplace. In commemoration, the municipal government erected a statue of the character in 2012.

== Geography ==
=== Climate ===
Tangamandapio has a monsoon-influenced humid subtropical climate (Cwa, according to the Köppen climate classification), with humid summers and dry winters.

Climate data for Santiago Tangamandapio
Month	Jan	Feb	Mar	Apr	May	Jun	Jul	Aug	Sep	Oct	Nov	Dec	Year
Mean daily maximum °C (°F)	23.9 (75.0)	26.0 (78.8)	28.2 (82.8)	30.8 (87.4)	30.9 (87.6)	27.4 (81.3)	24.9 (76.8)	25.1 (77.2)	24.6 (76.3)	25.0 (77.0)	24.6 (76.3)	24.0 (75.2)	26.3 (79.3)
Daily mean °C (°F)	15.7 (60.3)	17.4 (63.3)	19.5 (67.1)	22.2 (72.0)	22.9 (73.2)	20.9 (69.6)	19.1 (66.4)	19.2 (66.6)	18.8 (65.8)	18.3 (64.9)	17.0 (62.6)	15.9 (60.6)	18.9 (66.0)
Mean daily minimum °C (°F)	8.3 (46.9)	9.4 (48.9)	10.7 (51.3)	13.2 (55.8)	15.2 (59.4)	15.7 (60.3)	14.4 (57.9)	14.5 (58.1)	14.2 (57.6)	12.6 (54.7)	10.1 (50.2)	8.6 (47.5)	12.2 (54.1)
Average precipitation mm (inches)	20 (0.8)	15 (0.6)	14 (0.6)	7 (0.3)	43 (1.7)	177 (7.0)	255 (10.0)	241 (9.5)	204 (8.0)	91 (3.6)	24 (0.9)	10 (0.4)	1,101 (43.4)
Average precipitation days (≥ 0.1 mm)	2	2	1	2	7	15	20	19	16	9	3	1	97
Source: Climate-Data.org
