= Chavo =

Chavo can have two or more meanings, for example. In Puerto Rico it means “Money”. In Mexico and some other Latin American countries the word would translates to "kid", and may refer to:

- Chavo Guerrero Sr., a professional wrestler
- Chavo Guerrero Jr., a professional wrestler who is best known for his work in World Wrestling Entertainment
- Chavo Pederast, one of the lead singers from hardcore punk band Black Flag

Chavo shouldn't be confused with the name Chavos. Chavos has various meanings. For example, in Spanish, Chavos means "May God protect the supplanter" or "Keys". The origin of the surname is the Spanish and Portuguese surnames, Chavez and Chaves. It also originates from the French surname Chavis.

In Portuguese, it was a place in the province of Tras-os-Montes with springs known for their healing properties. In Hebrew, it derives from the name Chavah, which means life, life-giver, mother of the living (Eve), to declare or show.

== See also ==
- El Chavo (disambiguation)
