= Luis Gimeno =

Uruguayan-born Mexican actor

Luis Gimeno (15 February 1927 – 24 July 2017) was a Uruguayan-born Mexican actor. In 2010, he received the TVyNovelas Award for Best Leading Actor. Gimeno was born in Montevideo and died in Mexico City, aged 90. His wife was the actress Virginia Gutiérrez.

== Selected filmography ==
- Ha llegado un extraño (1959)
- Don Bosco (1961)
- La madrastra (1962)
- Cristina Guzmán (1966)
- La dueña (1966)
- Leyendas de México (1968)
- De la tierra a la luna (1969)
- Alcanzar una estrella II (1991)
- María Mercedes (1992)
- María La Del Barrio (1995)
- La antorcha encendida (1996)
- Rencor apasionado (1998)
- DKDA: Sueños de juventud (1999)
- Amarte es mi Pecado (2004)
- Barrera de amor (2005)
- Pablo y Andrea (2005)
- Mañana es para siempre (2008)
- Hasta que el dinero nos separe (2009)
