= Enrique Segoviano =

Dominican television producer

- Born: Enrique Eugenio Segoviano Santos; 6 December 1944 (age 81); La Romana, Dominican Republic
- Occupations: Director; producer; actor
- Years active: 1968–present
- Spouse: Angeles Coro
- Children: 2

Enrique Eugenio Segoviano Santos (born 6 December 1944, La Romana, Dominican Republic) is a Dominican-born television producer and director. He is best known as director of Chespirito's various 1970s television series as well as for producing and directing the late 1980s-early 1990s variety series Anabel.

== Biography ==
Segoviano began his career on-camera, in the 1966 movie Primer dia de clases. When Television Independiente de Mexico began in 1969, Segoviano was hired as a staff producer and director. There, he first met Roberto Gomez Bolaños while working on the series Sabado de la fortuna. Then in 1970, Segoviano became director of the Chespirito television series. In 1973, TIM merged with Telesistema Mexicano to become Televisa; Segoviano then stayed with Televisa. His first two Televisa series were El Chavo and El Chapulín Colorado, both starring Chespirito. As camera director of both series, Segoviano became responsible for special effects.

Segoviano's contract with Chespirito ended in 1978, but not before he directed the movie El Chanfle, released by Televicine (now Videocine) the next year. By then Chespirito had taken over directorial duties. Also in 1979, Segoviano produced his first post-Chespirito series, Odisea burbujas. This program, which ran until 1984, became a pioneer in its usage of on-screen electronic graphics in its second year on the air. Shortly afterward, other Televisa programs, starting with those produced at Televisa San Angel, where Odisea burbujas and most of Segoviano's other programs were taped, followed suit. Nineteen eighty-four would be the first of two non-consecutive years in which Segoviano would produce and direct three different television series: Hola Mexico!, a precursor to Hoy notable for introducing actress Edith González, and the telenovelas Te amo and Sí, mi amor.

His biggest success of the 1980s as well as the 1990s would be the variety series Anabel. The series made stars of several regulars, namely Anabel Ferreira and Maria Alicia Delgado, whose "Abuela" characterization was introduced on this series. A young Eugenio Derbez was a regular in the show's first few years. For several years during the show's run, he was nominated at the Premios TVyNovelas ceremonies against Raúl Velasco (producer and host of Siempre en Domingo, which was annually preempted for the ceremonies) as producer of Mexico's "best variety series." In 1995, Segoviano again found himself producing three series at the same time: Anabel, the comedy series Y sin embargo se mueve with Fernando Lujan, and the telenovela Pobre niña rica.

As of 2010 Segoviano remained a successful producer with Televisa. In 2001, he produced the game show 100 mexicanos dijeron, which was based on the American game show Family Feud. He most recently produced Todo el mundo cree que sabe.

== Filmography ==
=== Television ===
- 1968 - Sube, Pelayo, Sube
- 1968 - Hermanos Coraje (Telenovela)
- 1968 - Sábados de la Fortuna
- 1973 - El Chavo (TV series)
- 1973 - El Chapulín Colorado (TV series)
- 1973 - Nosotros los pobres (serie de TV)
- 1978 - El Show de Eduardo Manzano
- 1979 - Odisea Burbujas (serie de TV)
- 1981 - La Hora del Saber (serie de TV)
- 1984 - Hola México!!!
- 1984 - Te amo y Sí, mi amor (Telenovela)
- 1986 - Ave Fénix (Telenovela)
- 1988 - Anabel (serie de TV)
- 1991 - TVO
- 1992 - La vida de María Félix
- 1993 - ¡Llévatelo!
- 1994 - Y sin embargo... se mueve
- 1995 - Pobre niña rica (Telenovela)
- 1997 - Atínale al Precio
- 2001 - 100 mexicanos dijeron
- 2006 - Espacio en blanco
- 2009 - Todo el mundo cree que sabe
- 2021 - Still alive and well producing

== In popular culture ==
In 2025, Segoviano was portrayed in the series Chespirito: Not Really on Purpose by Rolando Breme under the pseudonym Mariano Cassasola. He did not give his consent for his name and image to be used in the series, so a fictional name and character based on him were chosen. The series portrays his role as director of Roberto Gómez Bolaños' programs, as well as his personal relationship with Florinda Meza, although Segoviano's testimony was not used, and his appearance corresponds to a dramatized reconstruction.
