= La familia del 6 =

Mexican telenovela

- Genre: Telenovela; Drama
- Starring: Miguel Ángel Ferriz; Angelines Fernández; Rafael Llamas
- Country of origin: Mexico
- Original language: Spanish

Production
- Running time: 30 minutes

Original release
- Network: Telesistema Mexicano
- Release: 1961 – 1961

Related
- Estafa de amor; Las gemelas

La Familia del 6 (English title:The family of 6) is a Mexican telenovela produced by Televisa and transmitted by Telesistema Mexicano.

Miguel Ángel Ferriz and Angelines Fernández starred as protagonists.

== Cast ==
- Miguel Ángel Ferriz
- Angelines Fernández
- Rafael Llamas
- Graciela Doring
- Raúl Macías
