= Fórum Chaves =

Chespirito Fans Club

- Website type: Web portal
- Available in: Portuguese
- Country of origin: Brazil
- Website: forumchaves.com.br
- Registration: Optional
- Users: 38,000 (2025)
- Launched: 1 February 2009; 17 years ago

Fórum Chaves is a Brazilian website founded and maintained by fans of the El Chavo del Ocho, El Chapulín Colorado, and Chespirito television series. It is considered the main Brazilian fan community for these series, even being certified by the Grupo Chespirito and involved in the production of the play Chaves - Um Tributo Musical and in the dubbing and broadcasting of the El Chavo del Ocho and El Chapulín Colorado series on the Multishow channel.

== Chaves: A Exposição ==
In January 2024, the city of São Paulo hosted the largest exhibition of Roberto Gómez Bolaños's works, inaugurated at MIS Experience. The Fórum Chaves team was responsible for the curation and media support, producing informative texts and content for the exhibition.

== Volta Chapolin campaign ==
The Volta Chapolin (lit. 'Bring Back Chapulín') campaign was organized by Fórum Chaves in 2012, after SBT removed El Chapulín Colorado from its programming schedule. The movement had the support of the series' actors Édgar Vivar, Rubén Aguirre, and the program's creator, Roberto Gómez Bolaños.

== Lost episodes ==
In 2020, Fórum Chaves released the documentary Episódios Perdidos: Uma História (lit. 'Lost Episodes: A History') on its platform, directed by João Victor Trascastro. The production brings together information and testimonies regarding lost episodes of the El Chavo del Ocho and El Chapulín Colorado series. The documentary features testimonials from actor Édgar Vivar (who portrayed Señor, Ñoño, and other characters in the series) and from fans of the show.

Fórum Chaves was also directly involved in rescuing lost episodes of the series. The most notable case was in 2025, when members of Fórum Chaves located and restored a recording of a El Chavo del Ocho episode that had been lost worldwide for 50 years.

== Multishow ==
In 2018, Globosat, a subsidiary of Grupo Globo, partnered with the Mexican network Televisa and Grupo Chespirito to acquire the broadcasting rights for the El Chavo del Ocho and El Chapulín Colorado series. Administrators of Fórum Chaves met at Globosat headquarters for a presentation of the project and stated on their social media that they had been summoned to discuss the project to broadcast the series on the Multishow channel.

The series aired with a new dubbing done at the Som de Vera Cruz studio in Rio de Janeiro, with the collaboration of Antonio Felipe Purcino, one of the administrators of Fórum Chaves.

== Fact-checking ==
Fórum Chaves frequently debunks rumors and fake news about the series, such as controversies involving the actors, backstage fights, and gossip about the programs.
