= La herida del tiempo =

Mexican telenovela

- Genre: Telenovela; Romance; Drama
- Directed by: Luis Beristáin
- Starring: Miguel Ángel Ferriz Sr. Angelines Fernández; Miguel Córcega; Aurora Molina
- Country of origin: Mexico
- Original language: Spanish

Original release
- Network: Telesistema Mexicano
- Release: 1962 – 1962

Related
- La herencia; Un hijo cayó del cielo

La herida del tiempo (English title:The wound of time) is a Mexican telenovela produced by Televisa and transmitted by Telesistema Mexicano.

== Cast ==
- Miguel Ángel Ferriz Sr.
- Angelines Fernández
- Miguel Córcega
- Aurora Molina
- Graciela Döring
- Rafael del Río
- Jose Antonio Cossi
- Emma Arvizu
