= Rafael (TV series) =

- Genre: Telenovela
- Country of origin: Mexico
- Original language: Spanish

Original release
- Network: Telesistema Mexicano
- Release: 1970

Rafael is a Mexican telenovela produced by Televisa and transmitted by Telesistema Mexicano in 1970.

== Cast ==
- Enrique Aguilar as Rafael
- Estela Chacón
- Angelines Fernández
- Belém Diaz
