= Sonata de otoño =

Mexican telenovela

- Genre: Telenovela
- Country of origin: Mexico
- Original language: Spanish

Original release
- Network: Telesistema Mexicano
- Release: 1966

Sonata de otoño is a Mexican telenovela produced by Televisa for Telesistema Mexicano in 1966.

== Cast ==
- Gloria Marín
- Prudencia Grifell
- Carlos Navarro
- Maruja Grifell
- Angelines Fernández
- Consuelo Monteagudo
