= Chaves (soundtrack) =

Soundtrack album by El Chavo del Ocho
- Released: 1989
- Recorded: Marshmallow studios in São Paulo, in October 1989.
- Genres: pop ska new wave
- Length: 22:21
- Language: Portuguese language
- Label: PolyGram; Polydor Records
- Producer: Mário Lúcio de Freitas

Chaves is a soundtrack album for the Brazilian version the Mexican series El Chavo del Ocho, released by labels PolyGram and Polydor Records in 1989. The album contains original songs and some adapted from the Mexican version that were commissioned by the TV channel SBT based on the success of the series on their channel during the 80s. The songs were composed by composer, musician, actor and voice actor Mário Lúcio de Freitas, the music features the participation of Marcelo Gastaldi, Cecília Lemes, Carlos Seidl and Marta Volpiani, all voice actors for the series in Brazil. The recordings took place at Marshmallow dubbing studio.

Most of the songs were adapted from the original soundtrack of the Mexican series by composer Antonio Palladino, known by the pseudonym Tati. The album had 4 original songs "Aí Vem o Chaves", "Kiko", "Chiquinha" and "Madruga" which were used in the Brazilian dubbing of the series, with the first serving as the opening of the series during broadcasts by SBT from 1993 onwards (replacing The Elephant Never Forgets) and the others serving as insert songs in certain episodes.

== Background ==
El Chavo del Ocho premiered in Brazil in 1984 on SBT, initially on the game show TV Powww! and later airing on Bozo where it became one of the channel's most watched series. In the late 1980s, the series aired on the children's show Oradukapeta, hosted by Sérgio Mallandro, who even recorded a song based on El Chavo del Ocho for the musical album of his show in 1988.

== Track listing ==
No.	Title	Writer(s)	Length
1.	"Aí Vem o Chaves"	Mário Lúcio de Freitas; Tati	1:02
2.	"Tchuim Tchuim Tchum Claim"	Roberto Gómez Bolaños; Tati	2:51
3.	"Kiko"	Mário Lúcio de Freitas; Marcelo Gastaldi	1:56
4.	"Conto de Fadas" (El País de la Fantasía)	Roberto Gómez Bolaños; Tati	2:42
5.	"Chiquinha"	Fernando Netto; Marcelo Gastaldi	2:34
6.	"Chaves, o Rei da Palhaçada"	Tati	2:45
7.	"Barulhos da Cidade"	Tati	1:52
8.	"Madruga"	Mário Lúcio de Freitas; Marcelo Gastaldi	1:39
9.	"Quero Viver Dançando"	Tati	2:37
10.	"Amigos Palhaços"	Tati	2:22
Total length:			22:21

== Legacy ==
The song "Aí Vem o Chaves" became a cult classic based in the Brazilian dubbing of El Chavo del Ocho largely because it was used in the opening of the series to the point of being listed among the best songs in the series. In 2019, the song was performed by an orchestra in São Bernardo do Campo along with the songs "Qué Bonita Vecindad" and "Joven Aún", originally released in 1977. In 2018, Mário Lúcio de Freitas was hired to adapt new songs for the Chespirito series during the broadcast by Multishow. The opening was also referenced in one of the episodes of Big Brother Brasil 19.

The band Trem da Alegria released the song "Foi Sem Querer Querendo" in 1991, which although being a song focused on El Chapulín Colorado uses Chavo's catchphrase for the title. In 1995 an album focused exclusively on the character Quico/Kiko was released in Brazil under the title Discoteca do Kiko.
