= La dueña (1966 Mexican TV series) =

- Genre: Telenovela
- Created by: Kenia Perea
- Directed by: Jesús Valero
- Starring: Jacqueline Andere; Miguel Manzano
- Country of origin: Mexico
- Original language: Spanish

Original release
- Network: Telesistema Mexicano
- Release: 1966

Related
- La dueña (1984); La dueña (1995); La dueña (2012)

La dueña (English: The Owner) is a Mexican telenovela directed by Jesús Valero for Telesistema Mexicano in 1966.

== Cast ==
- Jacqueline Andere
- María Teresa Rivas
- Miguel Manzano
- Gloria Marin
- Hortensia Santoveña
- Carolina Barret
- Fernando Mendoza
- Luis Gimeno
- Raúl "Chato" Padilla
