= La madrastra (1962 TV series) =

- Genre: Telenovela
- Country of origin: Mexico
- Original language: Spanish

Original release
- Network: Telesistema Mexicano
- Release: 1962

Related
- La madrastra (1981); La madrastra (2005)

La madrastra (English: Stepmother) is a Mexican telenovela produced by Televisa for Telesistema Mexicano in 1962.

== Cast ==
- Gloria Marín
- Eduardo Fajardo
- Raúl Ramírez
- Susana Alexander
- Angelines Fernández
- Josefina Escobedo
- Prudencia Grifell
- Marcela Daviland
- Raúl Meraz
- Luis Gimeno
- Consuelo Monteagudo
