= Las gemelas (1961 TV series) =

- Genre: Telenovela; Drama
- Created by: Marissa Garrido
- Starring: Beatriz Aguirre; Rafael Bertrand; Magda Guzmán
- Country of origin: Mexico
- Original language: Spanish

Production
- Executive producer: Ernesto Alonso
- Running time: 30 minutes

Original release
- Network: Telesistema Mexicano
- Release: 1961 – 1961

Related
- La Familia del 6; La honra de vivir; Puente de amor (1969) Las gemelas (1972)

Las gemelas (English title:The twins) is a Mexican telenovela produced by Ernesto Alonso and transmitted by Telesistema Mexicano.

Beatriz Aguirre starred as protagonist/main antagonist and Rafael Bertrand starred as protagonist.

== Cast ==
- Beatriz Aguirre as Paula/Amelia
- Rafael Bertrand as Carlos
- Magda Guzmán
- Carlos Agostí
- Eduardo Noriega
