= Raúl Padilla =

Mexican actor (1918–1994)

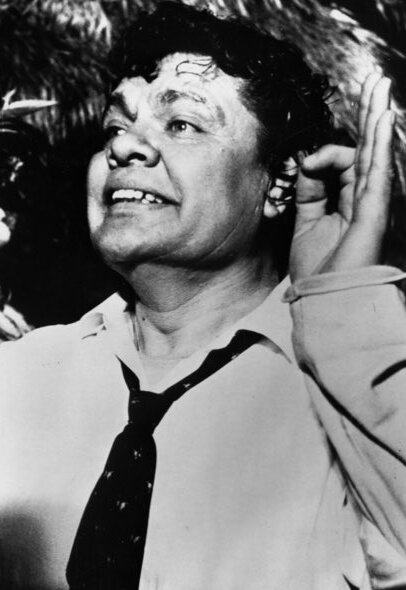
- Padilla in Vidita negra (1973)
- Born: Raúl Padilla García; 17 June 1918; Monterrey, Nuevo León, Mexico
- Died: 3 February 1994 (aged 75); Mexico City, Mexico
- Years active: 1964–1994
- Notable work: Jaimito, el cartero in El Chavo del Ocho
- Spouse: Lili Inclán
- Children: 1

Raúl "Chato" Padilla García (17 June 1918 – 3 February 1994) was a Mexican actor, and a member of Chespirito's comedy troupe, famous for his character in El Chavo del Ocho, Jaimito, el cartero ("Jaimito, the Mailman").

== Birth ==
Padilla was born 17 June 1918 in Monterrey.

== Career ==
Padilla joined the show in 1979 following the departure of Ramón Valdés, gradually taking over the sorts of roles Valdés used to play. He also worked on the film El Chanfle, scripted and starred by Chespirito. Padilla's second major character was that of Licenciado Morales, who was in charge of the local police station in Los Caquitos.

== Death ==
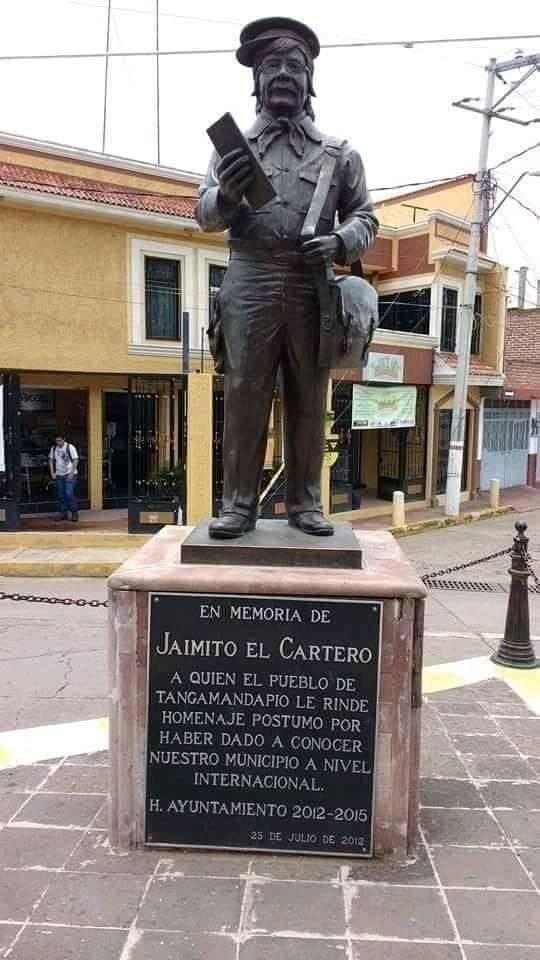
A bronze statue made as a tribute to him, located in Tangamandapio

Raúl died of a heart attack on February 3, 1994, at age 75. His nickname, "Chato", means "pug"; the nickname was in reference to his broad, flat nose. His son, Raul Padilla Jr. "El Choforo" (1940-2013) also worked with Chespirito and was an actor in his own right.

== Filmography ==
List of performances by Raúl Padilla in film
Year	Title	Role	Notes
1968	Caballo prieto azabache	Doroteo Arango / Pancho Villa	Uncredited
1969	La gran aventura		
1969	Con licencia para matar	Encargado del edificio	
1970	Emiliano Zapata		
1973	Vidita negra	Licenciado Arnulfo Dupont	
1974	Calzonzín inspector	Tiziano Truyé	
1975	Bellas de noche		
1975	El albañil	Juez	
1976	Espejismo de la ciudad	Don Fili	
1976	El ministro y yo	El Licenciado	
1979–1980	El Chavo del Ocho	Jaimito el Cartero	TV series
1979	El Chanfle	Paco	
1979	¿A que le tiras cuando sueñas... Mexicano?		
1980	Hilario Cortes, el rey del talón		
1980	Las tentadoras		
1980	Burlesque		
1980	Sexo contra sexo		
1980–1994	Chespirito	Juez / Licenciado Moralez / Jaimito el cartero	TV series
1981	Cuentos colorados		
1981	Juan el enterrador		
1982	El Chanfle 2	Paco	
1982	La pulquería 2		
1983	Don ratón y don ratero	Boxer	
1984	Las glorias del gran Púas		
1984	Charrito	Sheriff	
1984	Entre ficheras anda el diablo - La pulquería 3		
1985	El ratero de la vecindad II		
1989	El pájaro con suelas		
1991	Este vampiro es un tiro		
1992	El chivo	Don Justo Madrazo (El Chivo)	(final film role)
