= Doña Clotilde =

Mexican sitcom character

- El Chavo del Ocho character
- Angelines Fernández as Doña Clotilde
- First appearance: 1972; 2006 (animated series)
- Last appearance: 1991; 2014 (animated series)
- Created by: Roberto Gómez Bolaños
- Portrayed by: Angelines Fernández
- Voiced by: Erika Mereles (El Chavo Animado); Mona Marshall (El Chavo Animado; English dub); Helena Samara (Brazilian dub)
- Motion capture: Andrea Noli

In-universe information
- Nickname: La Bruja del 71
- Species: Human
- Gender: Female
- Occupation: None
- Family: Unnamed sister in France; Unnamed niece
- Children: None
- Home: Flat N° 71 of the neighborhood
- Nationality: Mexican

Doña Clotilde, known as La Bruja del 71 (transl. The Witch from Number 71), is a fictional character of the Mexican television sitcom series El Chavo del Ocho. An eccentric and flamboyant single woman, she is portrayed by Spanish-Mexican actress Angelines Fernández.

Fernández's character first appeared on the series in 1972 and was part of the main cast for almost all of it, leaving the series in 1991, one year before its end.

== Concept and creation ==
Fernández was a Spanish-born actress who had to flee her native Spain in 1947 amid increasing persecution of political opponents by the regime of Francisco Franco. She had been supportive of the Republicans during the Spanish Civil War and its aftermath, and she was concerned that her undercover support for the Maquis could put her life at risk. She first lived in Cuba, where she was given refugee status, and later moved to Mexico, where she settled and remained until her death in March 1994.

In Mexico, Fernández began to work in the national cinema, becoming acquainted and befriending Mexican actor Ramón Valdés, with whom she was cast in several films. In 1971, Fernández asked Valdés to help her find an important role in an acting project. Valdés spoke with Roberto Gómez Bolaños (Chespirito), who was assembling a cast for his project of El Chavo. Fernández subsequently met with Chespirito, who decided to hire her in that same first interview.

== Characterization ==
Living in the apartment Number 71 of the vecindad, Doña Clotilde is a middle-aged single woman who tends to dress and act like a much older woman, leading the children and adults alike to frequently mock her. Due to her usual bad mood, reclusive and secretive life, plus erratic behaviors like a romantic infatuation with Don Ramón (portrayed by Valdés), Doña Clotilde is dubbed La Bruja del 71 by the kids in the vecindad, who both mock and fear her.

She says to have relatives in Guanajuato and once said to be from Campeche, and has a younger sister living in Paris, France. Unemployed or retired, Doña Clotilde enjoys a relatively good economic status and travels to see her sister in France. In one episode of 1973 (later remade in 1978 and in 1983), Doña Clotilde takes care of her niece, who is sent to her by the baby's mother.

The character, regardless of the kids mocking her appearance, develops close bonds with them, inviting them for a meal, gifting them with lollipops and chocolates. Doña Clotilde's feelings for Don Ramón are never reciprocal, with Don Ramón experiencing shudders, awkwardness, embarrassment, and pity for her. Doña Clotilde's advances usually end with Don Ramón escaping or avoiding her. She is nonetheless undeterred by this rejection and often bakes cakes, purchases food and medications for Don Ramón, with his daughter (La Chilindrina) believing that she wants to perform witchcraft on her father.

In a 1981 episode (as part of a sketch in Chespirito), Doña Clotilde marries Don Ramón in a classic Catholic ceremony. The 10-minute sketch shows in the end that it was a daydream of El Chavo. The short video was broadcast only once by Televisa after it sparked backlash from the Mexican Catholic Church, which saw it inappropriate that a single lay man (Professor Jirafales, portrayed by Rubén Aguirre) who showed strong romantic feelings for Doña Florinda (Florinda Meza) acted as the imaginary wedding's priest.

Doña Clotilde is depicted only once as a true witch, when she is shown inside her house preparing a love potion for Don Ramón. The episode ends by showing (similar to the marriage sketch) that it was the imagination of El Chavo and other kids.

In a single episode titled Los espíritus chocarreros (a Spanish-language reference to poltergeists), Doña Clotilde believes that a series of mysterious disappearances of plates from Don Ramón's flat is linked to paranormal activity. She convinces Don Ramón and Doña Florinda to perform a ritual to solve the issue, only making it worse by causing fear and superstition in the characters, including the children. The source of the mystery is revealed to be Don Ramón's sleepwalking.

Despite her name being Clotilde, Don Ramón calls her Cleotilde.

== Costumes ==
For most of the series, Doña Clotilde wears a cerulean blue dress, black shoes, and a battered matching blue party hat with her white hair gathered in a bun. In a few episodes she wears a shiny black blazer and, beginning in the 1980s, she replaces the cerulean hat for a fuchsia one.

In a 1973 episode, Doña Clotilde was replaced for a nearly identical character portrayed by Janet Arceo; Doña Eduviges, wearing similar clothing, exposing eccentric behavior and an infatuation with Don Ramón, drew an immediate analogy with Fernández's character. Arceo replaced Fernández during a health episode that forced her to take rest. The kids make fun of Doña Eduviges and nickname her as The crazy lady upstairs due to her apartment being located on an upper level in the main patio.

== Other appearances ==
In the animated series El Chavo Animado (2006–2014), Doña Clotilde was voiced by Erika Mireles in the Spanish version and by Mona Marshall in the English dubbing, where she is known as "Miss Pinster".

Doña Clotilde also appears in the 2025 HBO Max biographical television series Chespirito: Not Really on Purpose, where she is portrayed by actress Andrea Noli.

== Reception and legacy ==
Marisa Avigliano, writing for Argentine newspaper Página 12, said that Doña Clotilde vindicates the image of being a single and independent woman. Avigliano adds that, according to the humor of those times, she was the subject of mockery because of being single and childless, as well as for the typical ostracization of age in women and women in general in the 1970s.

In September 2017, Fernández's daughter, Paloma, announced that one of her original blue dresses from the series would be auctioned.

In March 2017, some Latin American netizens asked for the cancellation of Doña Clotilde, arguing that her persistent advances on Don Ramón and the insistence on seducing him amounted to harassment due to Don Ramón not consenting to said advances. The campaign followed the removal of Pepé Le Pew from the film Space Jam: A New Legacy due to allegations that the character "promoted harassment".

== Cited works ==
- Gómez Bolaños, Roberto (2007). El diario del Chavo del Ocho. Mexico City: Punto de Lectura. ISBN 978-970-731-094-0. OCLC 64391953.
