= Horacio Gómez Bolaños =

Mexican actor

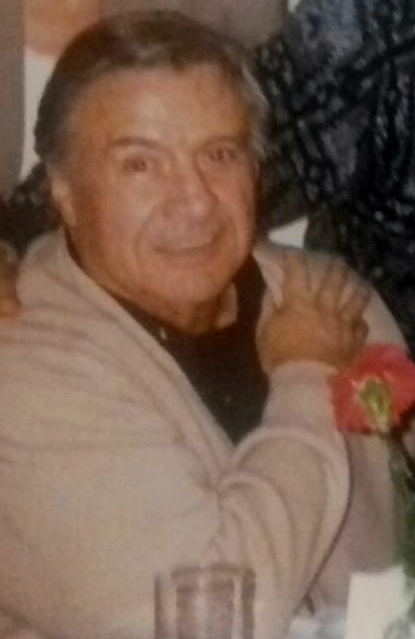
- Bolaños in 1994
- Born: 28 July 1930; Mexico City, Mexico
- Died: 21 November 1999 (aged 69); Mexico City, Mexico
- Other name: Godínez
- Occupations: Film director, actor, screenwriter, comedian
- Years active: 1959–1995
- Television: El Chavo del Ocho
- Relatives: Roberto Gómez Bolaños (Brother), Gustavo Díaz Ordaz (cousin), Roberto Gómez Fernández (Nephew)

Horacio Gómez Bolaños (28 July 1930 – 21 November 1999) was a Mexican actor and brother of Roberto Gómez Bolaños (Chespirito). On the TV show El Chavo, he played the character Godínez. Although Horacio appeared in many of his brother's productions, he preferred to handle the business aspects.

== Career ==
Gómez Bolaños did not consider an acting career when he was young. Instead, he went to university to study business and graduated with a degree in business administration.

When Chespirito started production of El Chavo del Ocho and El Chapulín Colorado in Televisa during 1970, he needed an experienced sales team to look over the marketing side of the productions. Chespirito hired his brother, who was to see, among other things, the sales of products related to his shows, such as toys, clothes and other show related items.

Chespirito saw something else in his brother, however, and soon, he convinced Horacio to try it out as an actor. As a result, Horacio Gómez Bolaños got the character "Godínez" on El Chavo del Ocho. Horacio Gómez Bolaños appeared less frequently than his co-stars on both of Chespirito's shows. Nevertheless, he also attained wide fame internationally when the show became a favorite among millions of Latin American children, as well as in Spain, the United States and other countries.

After the production of both El Chavo del Ocho and El Chapulín Colorado were finished, Horacio Gómez Bolaños retired from acting, focusing instead on directing, producing and overseeing the marketing aspects of other Televisa productions.

== Death ==
Gómez Bolaños died on 21 November 1999 of a heart attack during the production of a tribute to Chespirito for Televisa. He was cremated and his ashes rest at the Parroquia Madre de Dios de Czestochowa Church, in Naucalpan de Juárez, State of Mexico.

== Filmography ==
Year	Title	Role	Notes
1974–1979	El Chavo del Ocho	Godínez / Waiter / Restaurant owner	TV series
1973-1978	El Chapulín Colorado	Various characters	TV series
1979	El Chanfle	Policeman	
1980–1995	Chespirito	Godínez / Various characters	TV series
1982	El Chanfle 2	Gangster	
1983	Don ratón y don ratero	Esposo de Aftadolfa	
1984	Charrito		
