= Angelines Fernández =

Mexican actress (1924–1994)

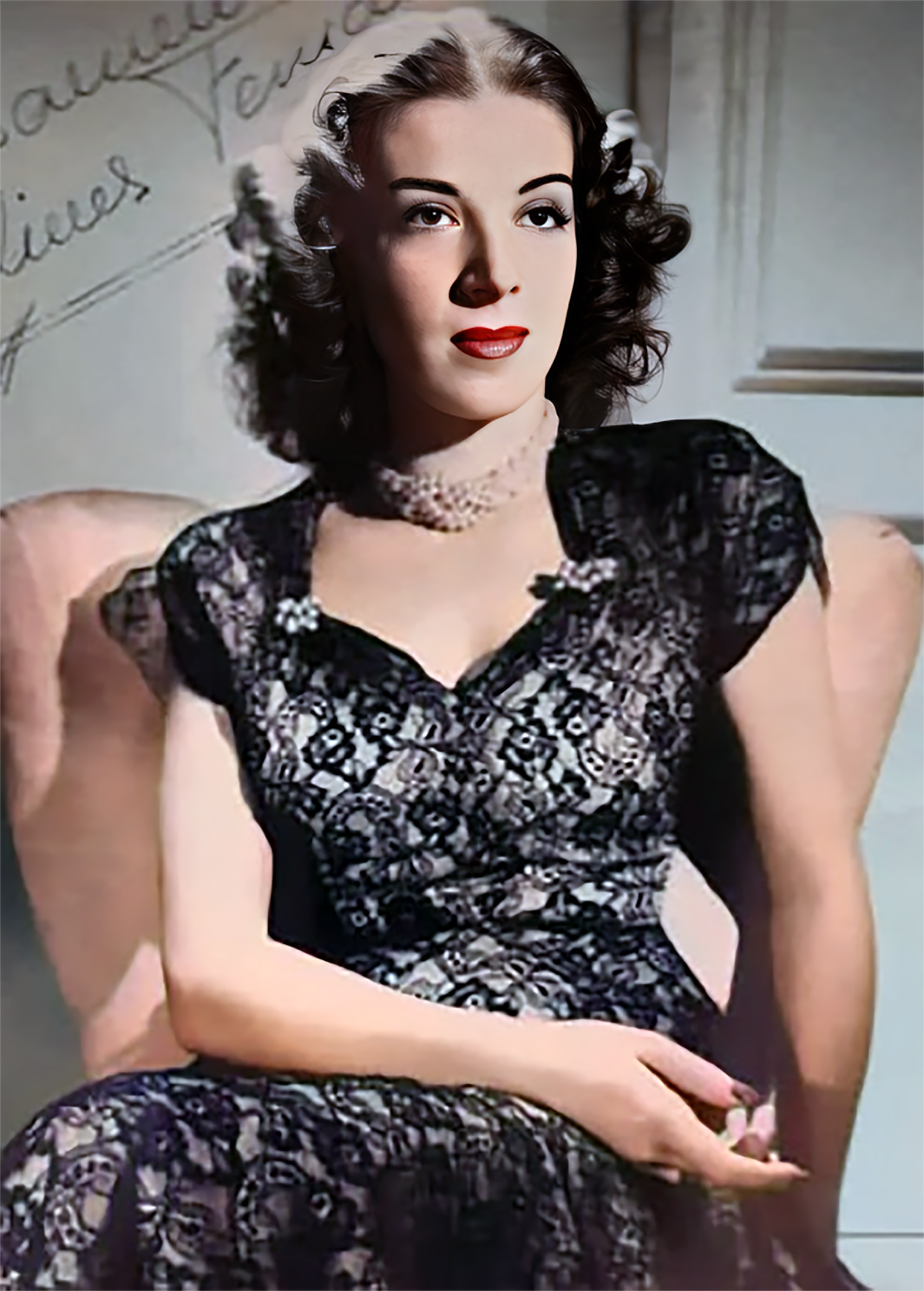
- Fernández, c. 1940s
- Born: María de los Ángeles Fernández Abad; 30 July 1924; Madrid, Spain
- Died: 25 March 1994 (aged 69); Mexico City, Mexico
- Resting place: Mausoleos del Ángel, Mexico City
- Citizenship: Mexican (Note: After leaving Spain in 1947 due to her anti-Franco activism, Fernández became a Mexican citizen and remained in Mexico until her death in 1994. Her death certificate only lists her as a Mexican citizen. Although the 1978 Spanish Constitution and subsequent laws allowed exiles and their descendants to recover Spanish nationality, there is no record that Angelines Fernández initiated this process, thus confirming that she was never officially recognized as a Spanish national again.)
- Occupations: Actress; comedian
- Years active: 1954–1991
- Notable work: Doña Clotilde in El Chavo del Ocho
- Children: 1

María de los Ángeles Fernández Abad (30 July 1924 – 25 March 1994), known professionally as Angelines Fernández, was a Mexican actress. She is best remembered for playing Doña Clotilde "La Bruja del 71" in the sitcom El Chavo del Ocho. She was an anti-Franco refugee who remained in Mexico (in addition to a brief stint in Cuba) from 1947 until the end of her life.

== Life and career ==
María de los Ángeles Fernández Abad also known as María de los Angelines Fernández Abad, was born on 30 July, 1924 in Madrid, Spain.

She made her acting debut in the musical comedy Carlo Monte en Monte Carlo in Isabela Garcés' theatre company in Madrid. She flew to Mexico in 1947 in fear for her life due to her support for the Spanish Maquis. During the Spanish Civil War, young Fernández was supportive of the Republican faction. She would remain in Mexico for the rest of her life, except for international tours and a short stint in Cuba during the late 1940s. In 1950, she returned to Mexico permanently.

Angelines Fernández starred in fourteen films, including the classic El Esqueleto de la señora Morales (1960). In 1964, she took the supporting role of Sara, the nemesis of Cantinflas's character Padre Sebastián, in El padrecito. She starred in Cadenas de amor at the age of 37, and other telenovelas in the 1960s with the second to last one in 1970. It was not until she was hired in 1973 to play "La Bruja del 71" in El Chavo del Ocho that she cemented her status as a legend. She got that job when she asked her personal friend, Ramón Valdés, if he knew of any acting jobs she might be able to do.

She also participated in Chespirito's other show, El Chapulín Colorado, years later. It was with El Chavo del Ocho and El Chapulín Colorado that she achieved fame in her native Spain. The two Chespirito productions became wide international hits, reaching virtually every country in the Americas and also other, non-Spanish speaking, countries as well. The shows are still shown with re-runs in many countries. In 1974, she participated in her last telenovela and her last film and concentrated her work around Chespirito productions.

After the shows ended in 1979, she continued playing "La Bruja" on the hour-long Chespirito and on public tours. Starting later in the 1980s, she began playing Ignacia Fernández "Doña Nachita", a second regular character on Chespirito, the gossipy neighbor in the Los caquitos sketches. She remained on the show until 1992.

== Personal life ==
Fernández had a daughter named Paloma Fernández.

== Death ==
On 25 March 1994, Fernández died at the age of 69, from arrhythmia, respiratory failure and chronic kidney disease. She is entombed at the Mausoleos del Ángel in Mexico City.

== Filmography ==
=== Film ===
- Maternidad imposible (1955)
- El diario de mi madre (1958) as Leonor
- El Águila Negra contra los enmascarados de la muerte (1958) (uncredited)
- Misterios de la magia negra (1958) as Laura
- Mi niño, mi caballo y yo (1959)
- El Esqueleto de la señora Morales (1960) as Clara
- Mi vida es una canción (1963)
- El padrecito (1964) as Sara
- Fuera de la ley (1966)
- Estrategia matrimonial (1967) as Margarita
- Un novio para dos hermanas (1967) as Profesora de piano
- Despedida de casada (1968)
- Esta noche sí (1968)
- Corona de lágrimas (1968) as Mercedes Ancira
- Un Quijote sin mancha (1969) as Prudencia Pingaron
- El profe (1971) as Mama de Martin (uncredited)
- El cielo y tu (1971) as conservative church woman (uncredited)
- Traiganlos vivos o muertos (1974)
- El agente viajero (1975)
- Kalimán en el siniestro mundo de Humanón (1976)
- Oye Salomé! (1978) as Doña Elena, mamá de Guadalupe
- El Chanfle (1979) as Paco's wife (Supermarket Clerk)
- El Chanfle 2 (1982) as Paco's wife
- Don ratón y don ratero (1983) as Sirvienta
- Charrito (1984) as Maquillista
- Dos judiciales en aprietos (1990)
- Sor Batalla (1990)
- Bella entre las flores (1990) as Doña Perfecta de Rico (final film role)

=== Television ===
- El Chavo del ocho (1973–1980) as Doña Clotilde ("La bruja del 71")
- El Chapulín Colorado (1973–1979)
- La Chicharra (1979–1980) as Úrsula
- Chespirito (1980–1991) as Doña Clotilde / Doña Nachita

=== Telenovelas ===
- Teresa (1959) as Esmeralda
- Cadenas de amor (1959)
- Un amor en la sombra (1960)
- Gabriela (1960)
- El hombre de oro (1960)
- La telaraña (1961)
- La familia del 6 (1961)
- La madrastra (1962)
- La herida del tiempo (1962)
- Teatro del cuatro (1964)
- La intrusa (1964)
- Tú eres un extraño (1965)
- Sonata de otoño (1966)
- La duquesa (1966)
- Encadenados (1969)
- Rafael (1970)
- Ha llegado una intrusa (1974)

== See also ==
- Foreign-born artists in Mexico
