= El Chavo del Ocho =

Mexican television series

- Also known as: El Chavo del Ocho (1973–1975)
- Genre: Sitcom; Comedy; Farce; Slapstick
- Created by: Roberto Gómez Bolaños
- Written by: Roberto Gómez Bolaños; Francisco Gómez Bolaños
- Directed by: Enrique Segoviano; Roberto Gómez Bolaños
- Starring: Roberto Gómez Bolaños; María Antonieta de las Nieves; Carlos Villagrán; Ramón Valdés; Florinda Meza; Rubén Aguirre; Édgar Vivar; Angelines Fernández; Horacio Gómez Bolaños; Raúl 'Chato' Padilla
- Theme music composer: Jean-Jacques Perrey
- Opening theme: "The Elephant Never Forgets"
- Ending theme: "The Elephant Never Forgets"
- Country of origin: Mexico
- Original language: Spanish
- No. of seasons: 7
- No. of episodes: 312

Production
- Producers: Roberto Gómez Bolaños; Carmen Ochoa; Enrique Segoviano
- Camera setup: Multi-camera
- Running time: 22 minutes
- Production company: Televisa

Original release
- Network: Canal 8 (1971–1973); Canal 2 (1973–1980)
- Release: 26 February 1973 – 7 January 1980

Related
- El Chapulín Colorado (1973–1979); Chespirito (1980–1995); El Chavo Animado (2006–2014); 30 Anos de Chaves (2011)

El Chavo, (Note: Spanish pronunciation: [el ˈtʃaβo], transl. "The Kid/ Boy".) originally and still often known as El Chavo del Ocho, (Note: Spanish pronunciation: [el ˈtʃaβo ðel ˈotʃo], transl. "The Kid/Boy from [Number] Eight".) is a Mexican television sitcom created by Roberto Gómez Bolaños and produced by Televisa. It premiered on February 26, 1973, and concluded on January 7, 1980, after 7 seasons and 312 episodes, and aired across Latin America and Spain.

A poor orphan boy known as "El Chavo" played by the show's creator, Chespirito (i.e. Bolaños), chronicles his adventures and tribulations, and those of his friends, frequently leading to comedic confrontations among the other residents of a fictional low-income housing complex, or vecindad ("tenement"), as it is known in Mexico. The sitcom explores the problems that many impoverished children face daily, such as hunger, sadness, loneliness, and a lack of adult supervision and attention, in a comical manner. Each episode uses comedic strategies, such as slapstick, irony, recurring jokes, and funny situations which the characters are usually getting into. It includes the use of pre-recorded laughter tracks to emphasize comic scenes. Some episodes conclude with a lesson, such as to not judge a book by its cover or to maintain good hygiene.

The series theme song is a rendition of Ludwig van Beethoven's Turkish March, rearranged by Jean-Jacques Perrey and retitled "The Elephant Never Forgets".

Chespirito, produced by Televisión Independiente de México (TIM), debuted El Chavo as a skit in 1972. Produced by Televisa, it began as a weekly half-hour series in 1973 after Telesistema Mexicano and TIM merged. In the mid-1970s to 1980, the show averaged 350 million Latin American viewers per episode, and it continued until 1980 when it became a segment of Chespirito. A Brazilian Portuguese dub titled Chaves has been broadcast by Brazilian television network SBT since 1984 and featured on Brazilian versions of Cartoon Network, Boomerang, and Multishow. In the United States, the show debuted on Spanish International Network (now Univision) in October 1974, it continues to air on the network as well as UniMás.

A successor to El Chavo was produced by the same creator, Chespirito, in an animated style. The show titled El Chavo Animado, aired from October 21, 2006, to June 6, 2014, just a few months before Bolaños' death.

El Chavo continues to be popular with syndicated episodes averaging 91 million daily viewers in all markets where it is distributed in the Americas. Since it ceased production in 1992, it has earned an estimated US$1.7 billion in syndication fees alone for Televisa. El Chavo is available on Netflix in select countries. It was temporarily removed in 2020, but was added back on August 11, 2025.

== Plot and setting ==
The titular character, nicknamed as "El Chavo" (meaning "the kid or "the boy"), whose real name is never revealed, is an eight-year-old orphan boy who lives in a neighborhood where he and several other characters, both residents and non-residents, interact with each other daily.

The central courtyard is the setting for most of the episodes. Surrounding it are the homes of Doña Florinda and Quico in #14, Doña Clotilde in #71, and Don Ramón and Chilindrina in #72, and episodes from 1982 onwards, Jaimito "El Cartero", who lives up the stairs in #23. The hallway on the right between #71 and #72 leads to another other courtyard, which has a fountain in the middle. On the street facade at the left, a corner store and a barber shop are shown adjacent to the neighborhood's entry.

El Chavo was filmed in a fictitious neighborhood set at studios 2, 5, and 8 of Televisa San Ángel in Mexico City.

In the later seasons, sometimes an unnamed park was shown. Several episodes are set in Profesor Jirafales' classroom, where he teaches; all the child characters in the sitcom attend the same classroom, sometimes with their parents. Others are set inside Doña Florinda's restaurant, a barber shop, and a sidewalk located at the entrance of the vecindad. Three episodes were filmed in Acapulco, Guerrero, which also served as a vacation for the entire cast, forming the famous three-episode saga Vacaciones en Acapulco, which became a popular cult for fans. The last El Chavo sketches were filmed in 1992 in Profesor Jirafales' classroom. The final sketch for El Chavo was a 1992 remake of "Clases de Inglés" (English Classes).

== Characters and cast ==
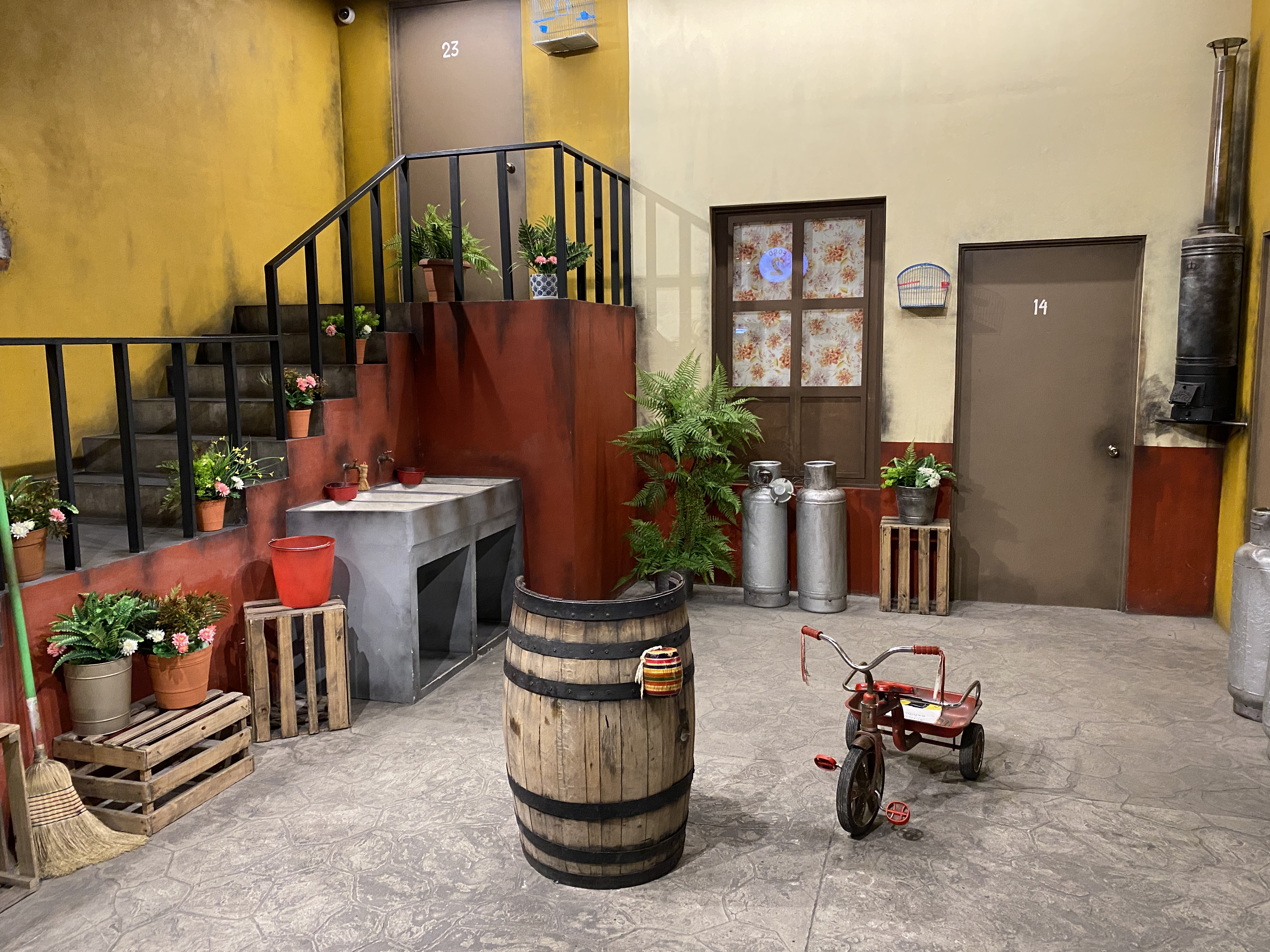
- Recreation of the set of the series at the Chanfle y Recontrachanfle-themed restaurant, located in the State of Mexico. (now closed)
  Roberto Gómez Bolaños as El Chavo
  - The main character of the series, an 8-year-old boy, who arrives in the neighborhood after running away from an orphanage where his mom abandoned him. He is accustomed to hiding in a barrel located at the entrance of the neighborhood, but he lives in the apartment #8, where a nice lady lets him sleep. His real name does not come up in any of the episodes. One of his main traits is "the Garrotera" (Stiffs), in which his body tenses and 'shrinks' to become paralyzed after being frightened. The cure is being splashed with cold water.
- Carlos Villagrán as Quico
  - A 9-year-old boy whose real name is Federico. In one of the episodes, it is mentioned that his father was a naval officer, so he is usually dressed in a sailor suit. He lives in the apartment #14 with his mother, Doña Florinda. He is very arrogant and envious at the same time, which is why he usually gets into much disagreements with the other children in the neighborhood.
- María Antonieta de las Nieves as La Chilindrina and Doña Nieves
  - An 8-year-old freckled girl, daughter of Don Ramón. She lives in the apartment #72 with her father, Don Ramón. She is very mischievous and intelligent. She is friends with El Chavo and Quico. She is in love with El Chavo, so she dislikes Paty, his love interest, in one of the episodes.
  - Doña Nieves is the grandmother of Don Ramón, resembling La Chilindrina, her great granddaughter.
- Ramón Valdés as Don Ramón
  - Lives in the apartment #72 with his daughter Chilindrina. He is unemployed and over 14 months behind on rent, indebted to Señor Barriga, so he always tries to avoid him as soon as Señor Barriga enters the neighborhood.
- Florinda Meza as Doña Florinda and Popis
  - Lives in the apartment #14 with her son Quico. She is prideful, cocky, irritable, bad tempered and haughty. She belittles her neighbors due to financial situations, referring to them as "chusma" (rabble), and usually does not seem to get along very well with them, particularly Don Ramón. She is in love with Profesor Jirafales.
  - Popis is the niece of Doña Florinda and cousin of Quico, and generally stays with her in the apartment when she visits. She also attends the same class Profesor Jirafales teaches. She is always carrying a doll, Serafina. Popis is as her nickname is: stuck-up (although she is calmer and more affable than her aunt).
- Rubén Aguirre as Profesor Jirafales
  - An elementary school teacher where the neighborhood children attend. He has a very romantic relationship with Doña Florinda. One of his most expressive characteristics is the exclamation, "Ta, ta, ta, taaaa, ta!" when he gets angry. His tall stature is made fun of amongst El Chavo and his friends (an example being his nickname "Maestro Longaniza", "Teacher Sausage"). His name comes from the word "jirafa" (giraffe), another reference to his tall height.
- Édgar Vivar as Señor Barriga and Ñoño
  - The owner of the neighborhood. In most episodes, he is greeted by being accidentally hit by El Chavo while playing on the patio. Due to his obesity, his is constantly made fun of by the children in the neighborhood.
  - Ñoño is the son of Señor Barriga. He is very obese and, much like his father, is the target of ridicule by the other children in the neighborhood. He also attends the same class Profesor Jirafales teaches.
- Angelines Fernández as Doña Clotilde "La bruja del 71" (The Witch of 71)
  - A single woman who lives in the apartment #71. Her appearance and strange mannerisms dubbed her "The Witch of 71" by the children in the neighborhood, which makes her get very angry. Having a dog named "Satanás" ("Satan") and conducting a spiritual session only confirmed the children's beliefs. She is in love with Don Ramón.
- Horacio Gómez Bolaños as Godínez
  - Attends the class Profesor Jirafales teaches. Normally ignores any questions directed at him.
- Raúl Padilla as Jaimito el Cartero
  - An old, gentle man in charge of the mail in the neighborhood. He lives alone. He always walks by his bike because, to get the mail delivery job, he was required to know how to bike. However, he lied.

== History ==
=== Origins ===
By 1971, Gómez Bolaños was already well known in Mexico for his self-titled sketch comedy show, Chespirito, which was produced by Televisión Independiente de México and aired on XHTIM-TV, channel 8 (now XEQ-TV channel 9, Nueve). He had already introduced El Chapulín Colorado and other characters.

The first sketch of the show, created by Gómez Bolaños, premiered c. 1971, and depicted an 8-year-old child competing with a balloon seller in a park. Character development was given much attention in the program, and each character was given a unique personality. Even though the program was about adults playing children, Gómez Bolaños decided from the start that El Chavo would be aimed at an adult audience.

=== Development and casting ===
The series' cast photograph themselves for a picture in 1977, without Carlos Villagrán (Quico). Chespirito is leaning on Chavo's trademark barrel at the center of the photo.

Roberto Gómez Bolaños was the show's main creator and star. He first called Florinda Meza to act in the show; Chespirito and Meza later married. Vivar was the second actor chosen for the show. A mutual friend recommended Vivar to Gómez Bolaños when he started casting. Gómez Bolaños cited Vivar at Forum 8 at Telesistema Mexicano – where the shooting was taking place. Vivar showed up as a scene was shooting; he laughed, and the scene had to 'cut'. Gómez Bolaños approached him, asked him if he was Édgar Vivar, and told him they would not be using an earpiece, to which Vivar responded that he didn't know what he was talking about. He hired him on the spot. Gómez Bolaños recruited Ramón Valdés because he had known Valdés for years and had seen multiple movies Valdés had made. Then, Rubén Aguirre was cast in the show as the character of "Profesor Jirafales". Aguirre and Gómez Bolaños had been working on scripts together for years, and Aguirre had already been playing the character of Profesor Jirafales on another Chespirito show, Supergenios de la Mesa Cuadrada, which spoofed current events panel discussion. Villagrán just happened to be a friend of Aguirre and a newspaper reporter, and he went to a party hosted by Aguirre. Carlos Villagrán did a comedy step where he blew his cheeks out of proportion, and Aguirre told Gómez Bolaños about his friend's hidden talent. Villagrán was promptly hired for the show. María Antonieta de las Nieves was a voice-over-only actress who used to go to Televisa to make announcements. Hearing her voice, Roberto Gómez Bolaños thought she was perfect for the show. At first, she refused by telling him she was not a comedy actress. However, Gómez Bolaños' retort challenged her: "Then you're not a good actress; there are no dramatic or comic actors—there are only actors." The last additions to the show were Angelines Fernández, a former film actress, and Horacio Gómez Bolaños, Gómez Bolaños' younger brother who had never considered acting before, was tasked to oversee the show's marketing.

The first El Chavo sketch was "El ropavejero", broadcast on May 11, 1972, it was created to replace the sketch Los Chifladitos, in which Chespirito and Rubén Aguirre played two madmen, Chaparrón Bonaparte and Lucas Tañeda. As Rubén Aguirre had left the program, the sketch needed to be replaced, and that was when Chespirito created El Chavo Del Ocho. Several "Chavo" sketches produced before the start of the half-hour series were grouped into half-hour segments and are shown before the "official" half-hour episodes in syndication. Many of these were also re-written and re-shot as half-hour-long shows later in the show's life.

=== Broadcast history ===
The TV show Chespirito, created by Televisión Independiente de México (TIM), debuted El Chavo as a skit in 1972.

On January 8, 1973, Telesistema Mexicano and Televisión Independiente de México merged to become Televisa. After the merger, on February 26, 1973, El Chavo del Ocho premiered as a half-hour weekly television series.

The first two episodes of the main character were intercut with a skit at the start that included Dr. Chapatín, El Chómpiras, or another character created by Roberto Gómez Bolaños. In reality, those were sketches shot in 1972–1973, intended for "Chespirito," the canceled sitcom. Following a few of those early seasons, the show started with an almost thirty-minute episode preceded by a sketch featuring Roberto Gómez Bolaños and his characters. This was the format of the first season.

Due to her pregnancy, María Antonieta de las Nieves departed the show at the end of the first season. It was observed that Antonieta de las Nieves, who was the first actor credited after Chespirito, primarily played the female protagonists in the first season's episodes, including those shot in 1972–1973. When Florinda Meza filled in for her, El Chavo and Quico became a fantastic comedy duo for the non-Chavo del 8 sketches. While she was not a part of the series, there was a contention that Chilindrina was residing in Celaya, Guanajuato, with her aunts. The character returned in an episode dedicated to her: El Regreso de la Chilindrina. During this absence, Bolaños introduced new characters: Ñoño, La Popis, Malicha (played by María Luisa Alcalá), and Godínez.

The second season began with El Chavo and Quico as the comic child characters and Don Ramón as the charismatic adult character. During that season, the classroom scenes began to appear alongside other child characters like Ñoño (the son of Señor Barriga, both characters played by Édgar Vivar), Popis (one of Florinda Meza's other characters), and the relaxed Godínez (played by Horacio Gómez Bolaños, brother of Roberto Gómez Bolaños).

María Antonieta de las Nieves was given "distinctive" last billing when she returned in 1975. After Carlos Villagrán and Ramón Valdés left the cast in 1978 and 1979, respectively, she was moved to top billing after Chespirito again. On the hour-long "Chespirito", De las Nieves was often given third billing behind Chespirito and Florinda Meza if playing another character besides Chilindrina. Otherwise, she always got the special final credit.

When Carlos Villagrán left the show, it was explained that Quico had gone to live with his rich godmother. "He couldn't stand the riffraff anymore", Doña Florinda explained. Not long after, Ramón Valdés also left the series. Chilindrina explained that Don Ramón left the city to look for a job and wouldn't return until he was a millionaire. With the loss of two of its major supporting characters, the ratings for the show slid, and Televisa canceled El Chavo on January 7, 1980.

On August 1, 2020, all broadcasters showing El Chavo and other shows by Chespirito in several countries had to temporarily suspend the broadcast of the series in their services due to deadlocks and legal disagreements between Televisa and Grupo Chespirito, which owns the characters and the scripts for the episodes. Grupo Televisa is in talks with several studios to distribute past and future projects, including El Chavo.

On September 7, 2024, Florinda Meza announced on Twitter/X that El Chavo del Ocho and El Chapulín Colorado would return to television after a four-year absence. Both shows would return to Univision, Galavisión and UniMás and stream on Vix beginning on September 21, 2024, for Univision and Galavisión, and two days later for UniMás. The show would return to Las Estrellas in Mexico a month later.

==== Chespirito ====
Later, in 1980, Gomez Bolaños returned with a revived version of Chespirito featuring El Chavo, El Chapulín Colorado, and other characters. The debut of El Chavo in this program was auspicious, with a wealth of new episodes being produced. Moreover, in 1981, Ramón Valdés temporarily joined Chespirito after starring in some unsuccessful shows alongside Carlos Villagrán. However, he permanently left again at the end of the year. The number of new episodes started to decline in the late 1980s and early 1990s, so once again, many early episodes were remade.

Eventually, Chespirito's age began to catch up with him, and it became much harder for him to adequately portray some of his characters, especially El Chavo and El Chapulín Colorado. In 1992, at the age 63, Chespirito retired the El Chavo character from his show (he did the same thing to El Chapulín Colorado one year later).

==== Conflict with Villagrán and death of Valdés ====
In 1978, Carlos Villagrán permanently left the show to start his own with Quico, with the permission of Gómez Bolaños. Within some time, he felt that the character's rights were his and sued Gómez Bolaños. The results of the lawsuit were favorable to the show's creator. Later on, Villagrán admitted that his exit was due to jealousy and envy between his character and El Chavo. According to Édgar Vivar, Chespirito was accustomed to writing all the best jokes in the show for Quico, whom he knew was very popular with the audience. Regardless of his conflict with Chespirito, Villagrán recorded his last episodes with his cast mates in 1978 with typical normalcy. Once he permanently abandoned El Chavo del Ocho, Villagrán wanted to use the character on another Televisa show. Gómez Bolaños denied his consent because Villagrán denied his authorship in creating Quico. Due to this, Azcárraga Milmo opted to cancel the independent project for Quico. Regardless, Villagrán continued to use Quico's character in Venezuela in 1981 in the show Federrico.

At that time, producers Valentín Pimstein and Fabián Arnaud asked Gómez Bolaños to write a script for an adapted film of El Chapulín Colorado or El Chavo del Ocho. Gómez Bolaños denied this request due to his belief that El Chavo was uniquely developed in the vecindad and, therefore, would find it hard to provide a new storyline that would be relevant to what has already been shown in the series. In its place, they produced El Chanfle, which used the same cast as El Chavo del Ocho. In this movie, Villagrán also appeared, even though he was much more distanced from his fellow cast mates.

Ramón Valdés also temporarily resigned from El Chavo afterward, in 1979, citing personal reasons. Because of this, Chespirito hired Raúl Chato Padilla to integrate into the vecindad in 1980, but Chespirito did not want to replace Don Ramón. Instead, Raúl Padilla would play a brand-new character named Jaimito el Cartero, who served as Don Ramón's stand-in in various ways. Although Valdés temporarily returned to the cast in 1981, he made his television series debut with Villagrán in Federrico in 1982. He collaborated with him again in ¡Ah qué Kiko!, which debuted six years later in 1988. Valdés was diagnosed with stomach cancer at this period, which put his health at risk. He died on August 9 of that year.

==== Conflict with De las Nieves ====
In 2002, Roberto Gómez Bolaños sued María Antonieta de las Nieves due to disagreements over rights to La Chilindrina. In 1995, María Antonieta de las Nieves proclaimed herself as the owner of the author's rights, to which Gómez Bolaños responded that he was the owner of the character being the creator. De las Nieves was not involved in the recording of El Chavo and was replaced with Ñoño and Popis.

De las Nieves won the lawsuit in 2013 and kept author rights over La Chilindrina. Due to this dispute, Gómez Bolaños and De las Nieves' friendship took a toll, and they stopped communicating.

== Seasons ==
Season	Episodes	First aired	Last aired
1	39	February 26, 1973	December 31, 1973
2	42	January 7, 1974	October 28, 1974
3	40	January 13, 1975	November 10, 1975
4	45	January 5, 1976	December 27, 1976
5	40	January 6, 1977	December 26, 1977
6	39	March 27, 1978	December 11, 1978
7	50	January 29, 1979	January 7, 1980

== Production ==
Direction and production fell into the hands of Carmen Ochoa and Enrique Segoviano, who had previously worked with Gómez Bolaños on the series Chespirito. In some episodes, Gómez Bolaños appears listed as the scene director in the credits alongside Segoviano. Mary Cabañas, Tere de la Cueva, Ersilia Anderlini, and Norma Gutiérrez were Ochoa's and the production team's assistants. Luis Felipe Macías was in charge of production, Saltiel Peláez was responsible for the forum where episodes were filmed, and Gabriel Vázquez was the camera director. At once, there were up to three camera operators to record a single episode; among them were Andrés H. Salinas, José M. Carrillo, Jaime Sánchez, and Armando Soto. The scenography was the responsibility of Julio Lattuf (in episodes from 1976 and 1977), Gabriel Bernal (in 1977 and 1978), and Alicia Cázares (in 1979), while Leopoldo Sánchez and Alberto García were in charge. Episodes were recorded in Forum 8 and 5 of Televisa San Ángel, although there were some exceptions where they were filmed outside, such as when the vecindad visits Acapulco. Some sources state that this episode was the only one where the entire cast was filmed together. Costumes were provided by Casa Tostado, located in Mexico City, which specializes in customized designs.

=== Opening and closing sequences ===
The song in the title sequence of El Chavo del Ocho is "The Elephant Never Forgets", composed by Jean-Jacques Perrey in 1970. This melody is based on Ludwig van Beethoven's Turkish March Op. 113.

In the opening sequence, María Antonieta de las Nieves was the first in charge of the presentation during the first two seasons (1972 and 1973), then Florinda Meza was left in charge when De las Nieves left, from the end of 1973 into the beginning of 1974. Previously, in 1974, Jorge Gutiérrez Zamora was in charge of the presentation. His first presentation was in the episode "El billete de lotería" [The lottery ticket]. Gutiérrez Zamora was in charge of the presentation until 1979, and was preceded in that same year by Rubén Aguirre until the last episode as an independent series in 1980, including in the first years of the series Chespirito (between 1980 and 1981). In 1983, Gabriel Fernández, De las Nieves's husband, acted as the narrator who presented the stellar cast. His first presentation was the episode in which Valdés temporarily returns to the show. Regarding the closing sequence, the credits only feature the production team responsible for the respective episode, with the last scene being of them or a related image, along with the musical theme used in the opening.

=== Music ===
In its first moment, music in El Chavo del Ocho was conducted by Ángel Álvarez, Luis A. Diazayas, René Tirado, and later, by Alejandro García. In some episodes, melodies were used to emphasize certain scenes. Among these are "The Second Star to the Right", originally composed for the animated movie Peter Pan, "Funeral March", written by Frédéric Chopin, "Miss Lilly Higgins Sings Shimmy In Mississippi's Spring" by Argentinian band Les Luthiers, "Minnie's Yoo-Hoo" from Disney, "Gonna Fly Now" from Rocky, among others.

In 1977, Polydor Records, a subsidiary of Universal Music, distributed the LP record "Así cantamos y vacilamos en la vecindad del Chavo", with songs that were incorporated in some episodes of the series. The record has 10 tracks, a little over a half hour. Among them is the song "La vecindad del Chavo" (colloquially known as "Qué bonita vecindad"), which went on to be one of the musical themes which the series would be associated with, after the melody was used as the opening sequence. Three years later, in 1980, another three records named "Síganme los buenos a la vecindad del Chavo" were also distributed in LP format, with songs from El Chapulín Colorado and El Chavo. In 1981, the LP record "El Chavo canta Eso, eso, eso...!" came out with 10 tracks distributed by PolyGram. Over a decade later, in 1992, the first CD with the series music was commercialized in following sequence, such as "Así cantamos y vacilamos en la vecindad del Chavo" (2000) and "Así cantamos y vacilamos en la vecindad del Chavo volumen 2" (2007), in the same format.

== Reception ==
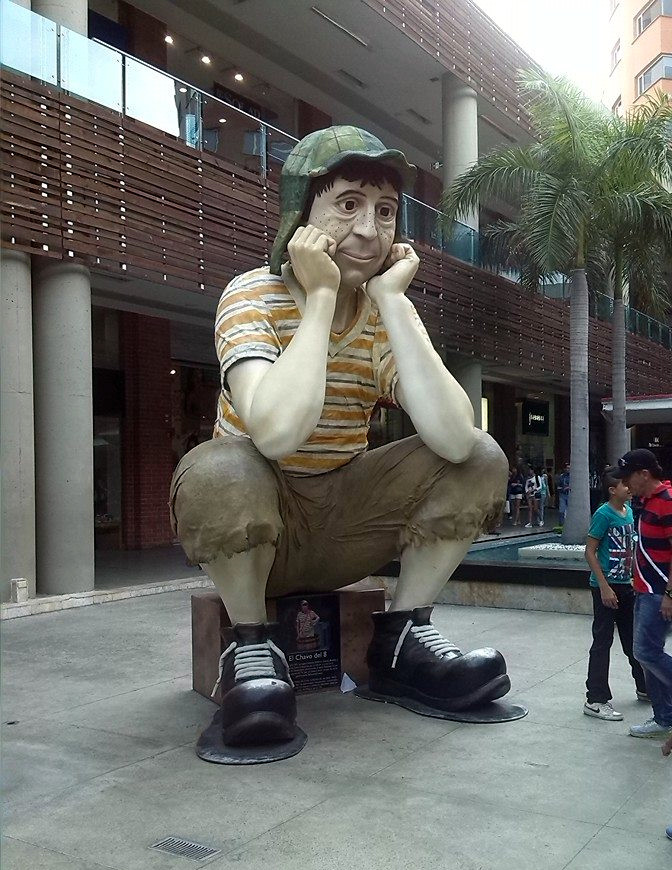
A statue of El Chavo in Cali, Colombia

El Chavo is the most watched sitcom in Mexican television history, with 324 episodes and 316 sketches in the 1980s Chespirito show (the 1,300 episode count that is often cited is incorrect because it includes all of the episodes of El Chavo del Ocho, El Chapulín Colorado, Los Caquitos, Los Chifladitos, and other Chespirito series). Since the 1970s, several TV stations have repeated it. El Chavo is also highly popular in Brazil, where it has been dubbed into Portuguese with the name of Chaves, broadcast by SBT; historically, since its premiere, the show has repeatedly recorded the first audience place at all time slots in which it was broadcast. The main reason for the program's immediate success is the similarity between the social realities and the culture of Brazil and Mexico, adding to the ease of adaptation of the dialogue and jokes between Spanish and Portuguese. The show still airs in the United States on UniMás and Galavisión as of 2012. The show in the United States is consistently the No. 1-rated Spanish-language cable program.

The show was so popular in Latin America and among the Spanish-speaking community of the United States that many of the phrases El Chavo and his friends used have become part of the vernacular of countries like Peru, Uruguay, and Argentina. "Chespirito" has established legal battles with former El Chavo del Ocho actors to prevent them from using the show's characters in Mexico without his permission. Carlos Villagrán moved to Argentina to use his character's name on his shows (Chespirito is not copyrighted in Argentina). However, María Antonieta de las Nieves won a court battle against Gómez Bolaños for the right to appear in Mexico as la Chilindrina. Nonetheless, María Antonieta de las Nieves retired her character in 2012 after a long judicial battle. She declared that a long judicial battle against Roberto Gómez Bolaños ruined her career and that her public image was tarnished, which "burned" her name in the market.

=== Critics ===
El Chavo rapidly became the most successful show on Channel 8, being one of the few to surpass the viewing quota from Channel 2 in its time. Initially, the series was considered "vulgar", even though it counted with a "good dramatic structure". Rubén Aguirre mentioned that it was qualified as "trash, stupid content". In Colombia, the government sought to forbid the distribution of the series due to their belief that it was "dehumanizing". Meanwhile, in Brazil, some executives from the SBT chain qualified it as "not recommendable" for distribution.

Even though Gómez Bolaños declared that the show was not intended for children as an audience, there are studies that children prefer to view shows that allow "them to relax through laughter", and El Chavo del Ocho was one of those shows that allowed them to do so. For Valerio Fuenzalida Fernández, from the Pontifical Catholic University of Chile, many adults "generally have enormous difficulties in evaluating comedy television programs for children, under the prejudice that humor would be a useless and irrelevant distraction, and therefore a waste of time" and would therefore prefer kids to be invested in watching educational shows, which he believed was an incorrect prejudice on their part.

Violence has been criticized as one of the show's themes. In 2008, a survey in Ecuador comprising over 1400 parents and children concluded that Don Ramón's blows to the neighborhood kids and Doña Florinda's slaps to him were a bad influence on the younger audience. In the Spanish journal Sphera Pública, Patricia Ávila Muñoz found that it is distinct from the familiar by presenting "isolated characters, and adults who are frequently made fun of by the kids" and that it involves blank comedy. She added that the dialogue was "lazy and tasteless" and that the show appeared comparable to The Simpsons, although "presenting one of the possible reflections of society... but minimizing social issues". Furthermore, other writers have incorporated prejudice and acts of hostility against the physical stereotypes of certain characters, such as becoming a target of criticism. El Chavo always hits Señor Barriga in this way. In addition, the other characters frequently ridicule him because of his weight. Popis, known for her nasal voice, once caused a parent claimed during one of the cast's tours that the character's speech was a sarcastic poke at children who had the same issue.

Despite the previous critics, some praised the content of the show. For the Chilean editor of the diary El Mercurio, Paulo Ramírez: "El Chavo is one of the characters and one of those series that is eternal"; in his analysis, he emphasized that, despite being a Mexican series, it contained "universal situations", and recognized its popularity due to any viewer being able to identify with the characters and their situations "with awe-inspiring harmony", especially those related to friendship and betrayal. In 2010, Ecuador's president, Rafael Correa, expressed that El Chavo is "the best TV show" and praised the script, the characters, and the actor's abilities, especially Villagrán as Quico. Due to the type of humor, it is considered the preceding show of double meaning in Latin America.

Like Ramírez, Ruth Rocha, a writer from Brazil, emphasized the universal theme from an "incredibly childlike" perspective. Furthermore, she noted that "what we see in the kids, animated, but real children in the manner of their relationships, reactions, and expressions [...] we can not only see a Mexican kid, but a kid who could be Brazilian, Argentine, or Chinese, what we see is a child who reminds us we once were too" was another factor contributing to the radical success. Likewise, Joaquín Bode observed in his review on Veintemundos.com that the show's appeal to viewers worldwide stems from its ability to "reflect the way of being and living of Latinos very well; but also the unforgettable and loved characters, where they live, and their moral and religious aspects were part of a common identity [...] it's a loyal reflection of the social reality of Latin America: people of low social class, unemployed, single parents, that despite all the problems, manage to move on with hope, good humor, loyalty, and friendship."

Brendan Koerner from the American online magazine Slate compared the series style, practically staged on one set (the vecindad), with the musical You're a Good Man, Charlie Brown (1967). He also commented that the Hispanic and Latino population in the United States watches El Chavo del Ocho mainly due to "nostalgia", which entails watching Mexican productions in a country different from their own. He noted in his report that the show was successful because it was transmitted generation after generation. Like his opinion, Carolina Sanín, who wrote for Semana opinión (former Revista Arcadia), mentioned that thanks to the "structure and aesthetics of comedy, and its juxtapositions", the show became one of the most memorable to her. She reflected on the possibility that its content constituted a metaphor regarding education and the nonexistent "inner child".

=== Awards and distinctions ===
In 1974, El Chavo was awarded, along with El Chapulín Colorado, with the Heraldo de México by the newspaper of the same name as "the best comedy show of Mexican television". In 2004, the Mexican association, A Favor de lo Mejor, gave the award "Qualitas" to El Chavo as the "best entertainment show on Mexican television", and in 2011, Televisa recognized the franchise as one of the most "productive brands in the company" in that year. In the award ceremony of the respective award, Roberto Gómez Fernández emphasized: "It passed the test of time, which without a doubt is a timeless work which will continue for a long time". Regarding distinctions, the Chilean magazine Qué Pasa classified El Chavo del Ocho as one of the "shows most featured on Chilean television", and Google distinguished it in 2016 as a "golden button" for being "the first show on Mexican television to obtain a million subscribers" on YouTube.

== Legacy ==
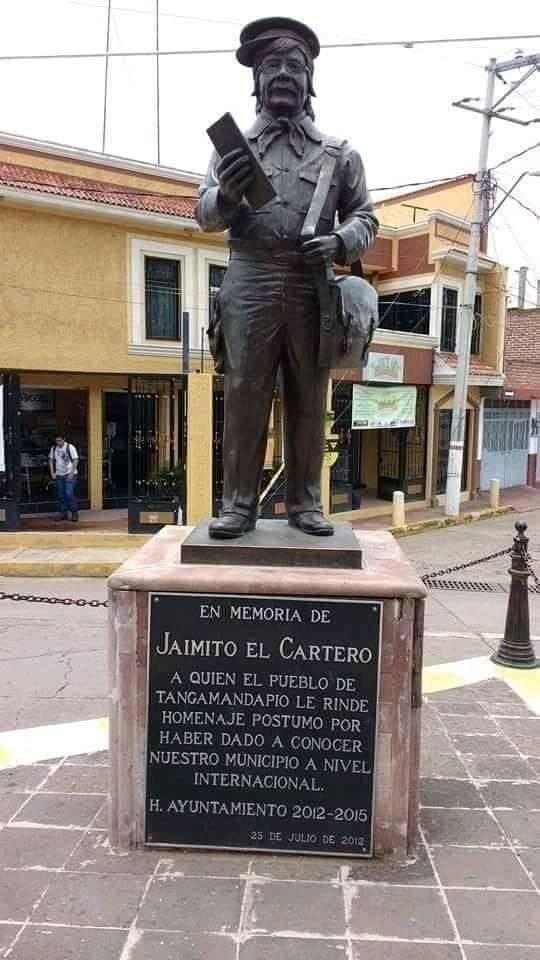
A bronze statue made as a tribute to Raúl Padilla, depicted as Jaimito el Cartero, located in Tangamandapio, Michoacán

El Chavo del Ocho became one of the most influential TV shows in Latin America as it turned into a shared cultural reference across the region. Its impact came from how it portrayed everyday life in a simple neighborhood, using humor to reflect social realities such as poverty, inequality, and childhood experiences that many viewers across Latin America could recognize. This made the series feel universal despite being set in Mexico, helping audiences from different countries identify with its characters and situations.

The popularity that the series generated allowed several of the actors to perform in their circuses both nationally and internationally. Such is the case of the circuses of Profesor Jirafales between 1970 and 2000, Quico in the 1990s, La Chilindrina in the 2000s and 2010s, and Señor Barriga. At the same time, the show's creator, Chespirito, has become an entertainment icon due to the success of El Chapulín Colorado and El Chavo del 8.

After the end of the series, Roberto Gómez Bolaños continued as a writer and screenwriter and, in 2004, married his co-star, Florinda Meza, while María Antonieta de las Nieves and Carlos Villagrán continued with their performances as Chilindrina and Quico, with whom they appeared in other countries and recorded albums. Both had legal issues with Gómez Bolaños for the authorship of their respective characters, for which they have remained distanced from him and other cast members. Édgar Vivar participated in the movie The Orphanage (2007) and the telenovela Para volver a amar (2010). Regarding his participation in El Chavo del 8, Vivar mentioned it gave him "nostalgia and good feelings [..] to have met so many people, traveled to so many places". Referencing the show's broadcast, he said: "It is a luxury that not everyone has the opportunity to experience".

El Chavo del Ocho has been broadcast in several Latin American and American countries; until 2011, it was distributed in at least 20 countries, including Mexico. Although "society changes, different from the preceding one where acts such as hitting kids was a disciplinary action" for their mischief, which in the modern era is not seen as appropriate, writer Julia Burg claims that the series' success was such that "episodes can still be seen on various channels across the world and children will keep growing up with El Chavo". According to Forbes, its broadcasts have led it to be one of the most successful programs in the history of television. In Brazil, for example, in 2003, various people protested on the street, asking SBT to continue broadcasting El Chavo on its channel. Their requests got executives to include it again in their regular programming.

El Chavo was recognized as "the Mickey Mouse of Mexican television" due to its success on the international level and its adaptation into the hit animated series in 2006, the first animated production created by Televisa.

Other television programs have paid tribute to El Chavo over the years. Examples include the Mexican productions of Código F.A.M.A., Big Brother and the Chilean Teletón 2007, which included a sketch in which De las Nieves appeared. In terms of the characters' popularity, an Argentine survey conducted in 2010 revealed that La Chilindrina was ranked as the audience's favorite Mexican female character, while Don Ramón enjoys a considerable following among the Brazilian audience (where he is known as Seu Madruga). Brazil has also produced video games and clothing with the character's image, in addition to serving as inspiration for some rock bands. In El Salvador, the same character (Don Ramón) served as an image for a civil campaign in 2010, which promoted Salvadorians not to pay extortion to gang members to guarantee their safety. In mid-2012, the character of Jaimito el Cartero was recognized with a bronze statue in the Mexican municipality of Tangamandapio, Michoacán, where the character was from in El Chavo del 8. Costumes have also been used by personalities such as soccer players like Sebastián González, who, in 2004, used El Chavo's distinctive hat to celebrate a goal, and Lionel Messi, who wore Quico's suit during a costume party in 2012.

In 2012, on the occasion of the 40th anniversary of his debut, an homage called América Celebra a Chespirito was held at the Auditorio Nacional, which was attended by almost 10,000 people, among them artists such as Juan Gabriel, Xavier 'Chabelo' López, and Thalía, and was organized by 17 countries, including Mexico. As part of the celebrations, a choreography of the song "Qué bonita vecindad" was performed at the Monumento a la Revolución. The program was broadcast simultaneously in more than 9 Latin American countries, including additional choreographies in other countries besides the one in Mexico. Similarly, Correos de México launched a series of five stamps printed with El Chavo's and El Chapulín Colorado's images.

In 2013, an independent funk group known as Bonde TNT made a song in homage to El Chavo del Ocho entitled Piripaque do Chaves (El Chavo's Stiffs), which went viral on the Internet with a clip of the group members dressed up as the protagonist dancing.

Several memes and accounts on social networks such as Orkut and Facebook, and even websites have already been created in honor of the series and characters, with greater prominence on the Brazilian website Fórum Chaves, considered the largest Internet community related to searching for information and news related to the Chespirito series. Fangames involving the characters have also been very popular on the Internet, such as the parody games by indie developer CyberGamba: Street Chaves, Super Magro World, Codename Madruga, Madrugacraft, or the horror fangame Dream Fallen Chaves produced by Paulo Fernando Pereira. An unofficial mod of a map created for the game Counter Strike recreating the neighborhood setting also became very popular among fans of the 2000s.

The character was honored in 2015 with a 5-meter statue built by a fan in Governador Valadares, Minas Gerais.

The village portrayed in the series is being recreated in Brazil recently by various establishments, museums and restaurants.

In 2022, Dish Network brought back El Chavo to life in a commercial using deepfake technology. The commercial features comedian Eugenio Derbez, a confessed big fan of Chespirito. In 2024, the cleaning products company Ypê ran a campaign with a commercial showing the characters being played by actors replicating the costumes and setting from the 70s and using the series' voice actors. Another commercial in the same format was made the same year for Samsung.

The final sketch of the October 4, 2025, Saturday Night Live episode was a short reenactment of the show, featuring Bad Bunny as Quico, Marcello Hernández as El Chavo, Sarah Sherman as La Chilindrina, Chloe Fineman as Doña Florinda, Andrew Dismukes as Don Ramón, Kenan Thompson as El Señor Barriga ("Mr. Stomach" in this translation), and Jon Hamm as Profesor Jirafales.

=== Spinoffs ===
After Carlos Villagrán permanently left the cast, he produced a new series during the 80s using the character Quico, whose name was changed to Kiko to avoid copyright problems with Chespirito. His first solo series was El Niño del Papel that debuted in 1981 and showed an alternative version of Kiko as a poor kid and never being referred by his name, just as "The Boy" in a similar way to El Chavo. The following series, Federrico from 1982 was one of the most notable, having been produced in Venezuela and also accused of copying many elements of El Chavo del Ocho, including the participation of Ramón Valdés, who played his character again but changed the name to Don Moncho. At the end of the decade, another series starring Kiko with elements of El Chavo del Ocho although more original was produced entitled ¡Ah qué Kiko! which again featured the presence of Ramón Valdés in the first episodes, this time using the original name of his character Don Ramón and Kiko returned to wear his classic iconic black outfit from El Chavo del Ocho.

María Antonieta de las Nieves made two spinoff productions with her character of La Chilindrina; a television series titled Aquí está la Chilindrina (1994–1995) and an adventure comedy film in 1994 titled La Chilindrina en apuros.

=== Brazilian shows ===
Some attempts to replicate the success of El Chavo del Ocho have also occurred in Brazil. One of the first attempts occurred in 1997 when the TV channel Rede Manchete made the children's TV series Vila do Tiririca starring the comedian Tiririca, which only lasted one season.

In 2000, a short-lived TV series inspired by El Chavo del Ocho titled Miguelito was produced a co-production between Gugu Produções Merchandising (GPM) and Câmera 5 being created by Gugu Liberato and Beto Carrero and airing on RedeTV!. The series was considered a failure among audiences and critics, with only 5 of its 22 episodes airing on the channel and being removed from the schedule after the first week. It was considered an unoriginal El Chavo rip-off with bad acting. After being taken off the air early, the series was assumed lost, with no record other than an advertisement announcing the program's debut, until in 2023, there was a position among fans looking to find the five lost episodes that aired on RedeTV! causing the show to become an Internet meme.

Later, in 2004, RedeTV! produced another series, Vila Maluca, which, unlike Miguelito, was better accepted by the public and lasted until 2006.

In 2016, an independent Brazilian short film titled Moleque (Portuguese for Boy) was released under the approval of Chespirito's son, addressing a more realistic scenario with the characters being played by real children instead of adults and having different names.

== Related projects ==
=== Comics ===
In 1974, comics based on the series were published in Mexico, and occasionally, some of these comics were seen in Chespirito's series, most notably in the El Chapulín Colorado series. Such comics are now rare.

In 1990, Sistema Brasileiro de Televisão decided to launch a sticker album with cartoon versions of the characters (with a new art style different from the 70s Mexican comics), initially having the proposal rejected by publisher Abril and moving the project to Globo, which derived from the success of the album also released a series of comics for the series. These comics were Chaves & Chapolim (1990–1993) which lasted 30 issues and Chapolim & Chaves (1991–1992) which lasted 15 issues. Both comics feature stories with El Chavo and El Chapulín Colorado. During this period, some comics focused on Chaves were published under the title Gibizinho.

=== Animated series ===
==== First series (2006–2014) ====
After several years of successful reruns, Televisa launched an animated spin-off of the program in October 2006. El Chavo Animado was produced by Ánima Estudios using 2D and 3D computer graphics. They animated the characters with Adobe Flash. Televisa distributed the cartoon throughout Latin America.

In this animated series, Chilindrina and Doña Nieves don't appear due to the then-ongoing disputes between María Antonieta de las Nieves and Roberto Gómez Bolaños on the rights of "La Chilindrina" and "Doña Nieves". De las Nieves feels that she should be entitled to monetary compensation if "La Chilindrina" and "Doña Nieves", the two characters she brought to life in the television series, appears in the animated series. Gómez Bolaños claimed that since he created the character, only he owns the rights to it. The legal aspect of the dispute ended in 2013 when De las Nieves won the lawsuit and kept author rights over La Chilindrina and Doña Nieves.

The animated series achieved enough fame to have its own video games, such as a self-titled board/party game for the Nintendo Wii, the racing game El Chavo Kart for Xbox 360 and PlayStation 3, and a social game that could be played through Facebook called La Vecindad del Chavo. There are also mobile video games and a series of educational video games called Aprende con El Chavo (English: Learn with El Chavo).

==== La vecindad del Chavo (TBA) ====
A second El Chavo animated series, which is expected to take place in the "Chespirito Media Universe", is being developed. The series, La vecindad del Chavo, will be produced by THR3 Media Group. It will feature the return of La Chilindrina, a character absent in the previous animated series.

=== Original series finale ===
During a visit to Peru in 2008, Roberto Gómez Bolaños told the media that he originally planned to make a proper finale to El Chavo del Ocho. In this finale, El Chavo would die after being run over by a car while trying to save another kid. However, one of Bolaños' daughters, who is a psychologist, convinced her father to drop the idea since, according to her, it could depress many children and even lead them to commit suicide.
