= El Chavo del Ocho (character) =

El Chavo del Ocho character

- El Chavo del Ocho character
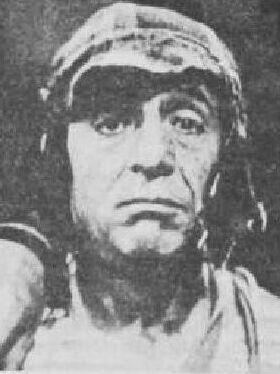
- Roberto Gómez Bolaños dressed as the character
- First appearance: El Ropavejero (1972)
- Last appearance: Clases de Ingles (English Class)(Chespirito sketch, aired June 22, 1992, live action); Historias de amor II (Love Stories II) (2014)
- Created by: Roberto Gómez Bolaños
- Portrayed by: Roberto Gómez Bolaños
- Voiced by: Jesús Guzmán (El Chavo Animado); Mona Marshall (El Chavo Animado; English dub); Marcelo Gastaldi (Brazilian dub); Tatá Guarnieri (Brazilian dub); Daniel Müller (Brazilian dub)

In-universe information
- Species: Human
- Gender: Male
- Occupation: Primary student
- Family: Unknown
- Religion: Catholic
- Home: Flat 8 in Señor Barriga's neighborhood
- Nationality: Mexican
- Age: 8 years old (Note: Bolaños was 43 when he debuted as Chavo and was 63 by the time "Clases de Ingles" was broadcast.)

El Chavo del Ocho ("The Boy From Number Eight") or simply El Chavo is a Mexican fictional character and the protagonist of the television sitcom series of the same name. He was played by Roberto Gómez Bolaños (Chespirito), who notably appears much older than the character is, and is voiced by Jesús Guzmán in the animated series El Chavo Animado. In the English dub version of the animated series, he is voiced by Mona Marshall. The character is only referred to as chavo, which is Spanish for "boy", and is given no name. He is an enthusiastic, creative and well-meaning character, but he is also portrayed as artless and simple-minded, causing other children take advantage of him. He is rumored to have came to his neighborhood at the age of four and be living in apartment #8. No mention is made of whom he lives with, but it is revealed that an older woman took care of him in her apartment until her death.

== Biography and personality ==
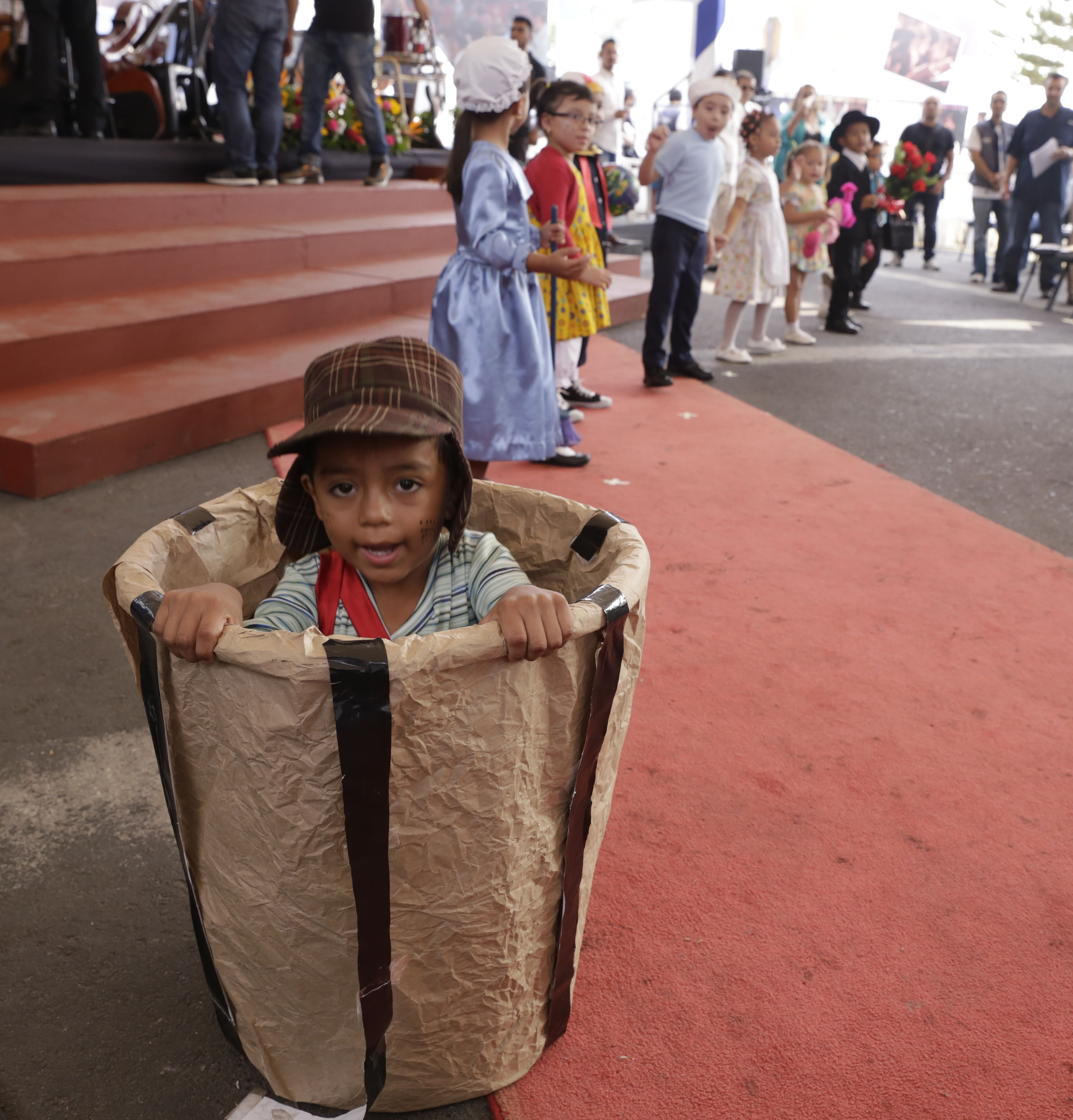
Children's performance, from El Chavo, for Salvadoran children

El Chavo is an orphaned and impoverished boy who spends most of his time in a barrel located in the front yard of a lower-middle-class Mexican apartment complex known as la vecindad (The Neighborhood); owned by recurring character Señor Barriga. The origin of the nickname "El Chavo del 8" came from the series being broadcast on channel 8 of Mexican TV (today Nueve). When the program began to be broadcast on another channel due to its popularity, the character himself explained he got his nickname because he used to live in apartment #8. His real name is unknown, in a recurring gag whenever anyone asked him, someone would interrupt before he could answer.

In the neighborhood, he plays the role of a chaotic character, frequently stumbling into mishaps and misunderstandings. His well-meaning but clueless nature leads him to unintentionally cause trouble, stirring up comedic chaos among his friends like Quico, La Chilindrina, and the others. Whether it is accidentally ruining a game or misinterpreting a situation, he is the spark that ignites small disasters. Despite their frequent conflicts and playful arguments, the group shares an enduring bond of friendship that somehow manages to survive his constant antics.

Although El Chavo is often clumsy and not the sharpest, he occasionally surprises everyone with clever and comical remarks. He earns his living by running errands, recycling empty cans and bottles, and saving money in his piggy bank for causes like the Red Cross, holidays like Christmas, and even for "the weekend of the year" or the Holy Kings, as he calls them. He also works odd jobs like selling newspapers, offering fresh waters, shining shoes, and waiting tables. While he is very honest in most things, this honesty tends to disappear when it comes to food—he frequently helps himself to meals when others aren't paying attention.

El Chavo is often the unwitting cause of contention between Doña Florinda and Don Ramón. His antics frequently set off a chain of misunderstandings, especially when Quico is involved. Whether it is an innocent game gone wrong or an accidental mishap, El Chavo's actions usually lead Quico to cry or complain, prompting Doña Florinda to come rushing to her son's defense. In her misguided attempt to protect Quico, she almost always blames Don Ramón, assuming he is at fault. This results in the infamous slap, with Don Ramón bearing the brunt of her anger despite having little to do with the situation. El Chavo's chaotic presence, though unintentional, keeps fueling the tension between the two, making him the accidental catalyst in their ongoing feud.

El Chavo has a deep weakness for food, largely because of his impoverished background, which often leaves him hungry. Despite his playful nature, hunger is a constant in his life, and he has a particular fondness for "tortas de jamón" (ham sandwiches). His cravings are so strong that food becomes his one temptation, even pushing him to "borrow" meals when others are not looking. This hunger-driven vulnerability is a key part of his character, shaping many of his actions and misadventures.

He has various iconic phrases such as "Fue sin querer queriendo" ("I did it on purpose, but I didn't mean to"); "Bueno, pero no se enoje" ("okay, but don't get mad"); "Es que no me tienen paciencia" ("you're just not patient enough with me"); "Se me chispoteó" ("it just slipped out"), "Vas a ver a la salida" ("you'll see when school ends", often said when not in school), and his classic "Eso, eso, eso" ("that's true, that's true, that's true"). When he is happy he stomps his feet as if dancing, and when angry he kicks the ground violently and furiously. He commonly plays with a broom that he tries to keep balanced on his foot. He creates simple toys from cans, cardboard, yo-yos, ball bearings and more, but these are overshadowed by Quico's, when he brings the same kind of toy but more modern.

== Appearance ==
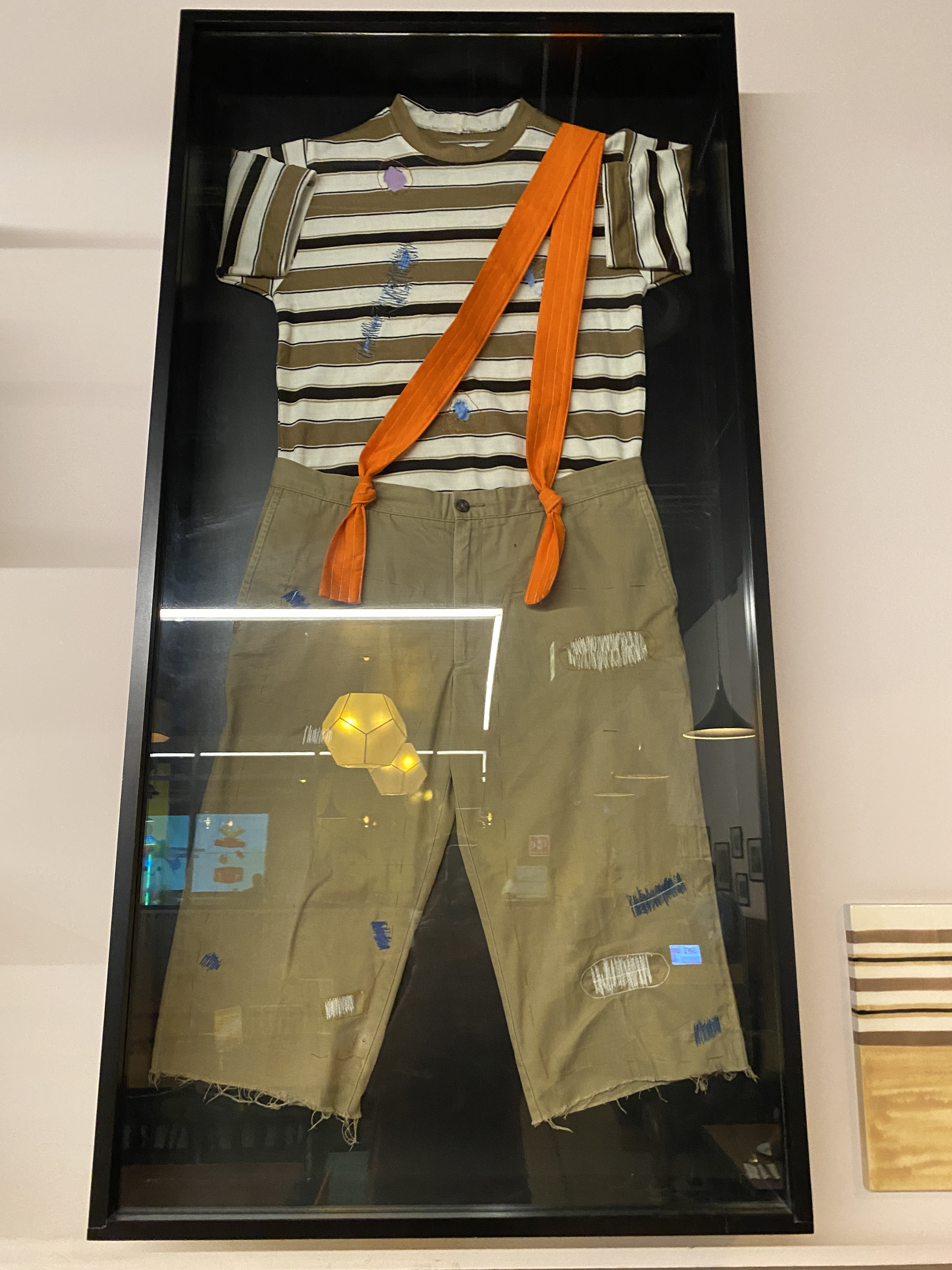
Costume used by Roberto Gómez Bolaños for the character.

El Chavo is freckled and wears a green checkered cap with a brim and earmuffs, a patched white T-shirt with brown and yellow horizontal stripes, brown pants held up by two red suspenders over his left shoulder, and black shoes, a gift from La Chilindrina, with yellow laces.

Although during the first episodes he could be seen dressed in light blue or yellow pants and on some occasions he has been seen wearing white or yellow shirts, and even with a shirt with the figure of El Chapulín Colorado, who is his idol, the same in the animated version, except for the shoes and the pants are orange and the shoes are brown.

== Personal name ==
In December 2016, theories circulated the Internet regarding the personal name of El Chavo, which was never revealed in the television series. According to these theories, El Chavo's real name is revealed in the book El Diario del Chavo del Ocho (The Diary of El Chavo del Ocho), which was written by Gómez Bolaños in 1995: Rodolfo Pietro Filiberto Raffaelo Guglielmi. However, this theory was discredited by the producers of the series, who emphasized that the same book states the character has no name.

It was difficult for me to start a conversation with him, since it was obvious that my questions provoked the natural suspicion of someone who is accustomed to receiving very little — almost nothing, I would say — from others.

— What is your name? — I asked him.
— Well, it doesn't matter, right?
— …? What is it that doesn't matter?
— Let him call me whatever. In any case, everyone says that I am El Chavo del Ocho.

— El Diario del Chavo del Ocho, Prologue

He lacks so much that he doesn't even seem to have a name of its own. But not even this is necessary, since his nickname, "El Chavo del Ocho", will be heard and repeated weekly by more than 300 million viewers.

— Florinda Meza, in El Diario del Chavo del Ocho, History

Canonically, El Chavo's struggle with his personal identity stems from the fact that he was born from a one-night stand of his mother, who would neglect the child in ways such as forgetting to pick him up from daycare centers. This caused El Chavo to develop a general attitude of detachment, manifesting in his disregard for a name.
