= Federrico =

- Genre: Comedy; Sitcom
- Created by: Carlos Villagrán
- Based on: Quico from El Chavo del 8
- Written by: Carlos Villagrán
- Directed by: Reinaldo Lancaster; Reinaldo Bolívar; Euclides Quijada
- Starring: Carlos Villagrán; Rosario Prieto; Ramón Valdés; Simón García; Nancy Soto; Alfonso Urdaneta; Maribel Ponte; Honorio Torrealba; Mariangeles Torrealba; Charles Barry; Roberto Hernández
- Country of origin: Venezuela
- Original language: Spanish
- No. of seasons: 2
- No. of episodes: 63

Production
- Running time: 40 Minutes

Original release
- Network: RCTV
- Release: 1982 – 1983

Federrico is a Venezuelan sitcom produced in 1982, starring Carlos Villagrán, Ramón Valdés, Simón García, Maribel Ponte and Nancy Soto. Being carried out by RCTV. in many aspects, the series copied and parodied many of the characteristic characters of El Chavo del Ocho (except Godínez and Doña Clotilde), adapting them to another type of environment and changing their names.

A second season of the series was produced in 1983 under the name Las nuevas aventuras de Federrico ("The new adventures of Federrico"). The Villagrán character was almost identical to Quico, which was his character on El Chavo series, the only change being the name, due to an ongoing dispute with Chespirito over the character, a pattern repeated with other former Chespirito cast members such as Rubén Aguirre and María Antonieta de las Nieves. Also, Valdéz's character Don Moncho is identical to El Chavo's Don Ramón, although he left the program halfway in season 1.

In 2009 Federrico was broadcast on RCTV Internacional on Saturdays at 8:00 a.m. Currently the series is available on the digital platform and YouTube channel.

== History ==
=== Initial history ===
in 1978, when Carlos Villagrán resigned from El Chavo del Ocho due to irreconcilable differences that to this day are not known with certainty. Bolaños assured that Villagrán wanted to leave the team to seek new horizons while the interpreter of 'Quico' assured that professional 'envy', due to the fame of his character, had led him to resign.

==== El Niño de Papel (1981-1982) ====
In 1981, he received a proposal from Radio Caracas Televisión (RCTV), a Venezuelan station run by Peter Bottome at the time, offering him the chance to direct and appear in the projects he had in mind. This is how he created the children's recreation program El Niño de Papel in 1981. Among this cast was the Mexican actor Ramón Valdés, who had resigned from his role as Don Ramón in El Chavo.

=== Federrico (1982-1984) ===
From 1982 to 1983, he made Federrico, where he again uses the name of the character who made him famous, but to avoid legal problems, he wrote it with the letter “K”. 'Kiko' (now with 'K' and with slight changes in appearance to avoid legal problems), who continued to tour with the character, found a new opportunity in Venezuela as a star. of a new Show, 'Federrico', produced and broadcast by Radio Caracas Televisión.

'Federrico' had two seasons produced between 1982 and 1983 with a total of 29 episodes. At first “Federrico” was well received by the Venezuelan public, but it failed due to lack of dissemination. A spin-off of the series was produced in 1983 under the name "The New Adventures of Federrico" (Las nuevas aventuras de Federrico).

=== Casting and Characterization ===
With the exception of Godínez and Doña Clotilde, the show imitated and mimicked many of the standout characters from the Chavo del Ocho series, giving them new names and settings.

"Don Moncho" persona is likewise the same as that of the iconic El Chavo del 8 figure, "Don Ramón" with the exception being that he has no children in this instance. The other characters' personalities and the settings they inhabit are strikingly similar. For example, Pichicho's character is similar to Ñoño's, Doña Carlota, Federrico's mother, is similar to Doña Florinda, Quico's mother, Marucha is similar to Chilindrina, Patty is similar to Popis, and Yoyo, the homeless boy, is similar to Chavo.

Don Salomón, the father of Pichicho who is in love with Doña Carlota, acts differently from the usual Professor Jirafales; however, he does wear an almost identical outfit, and whenever Doña Carlota and him see each other, they find themselves in a situation akin to Professor Girafales with Doña Florinda. Additionally, he owns the neighborhood where the plot takes place, and he resembles Señor Barriga (Ñoño's father), albeit with a thinner build.

== Plot ==
Federrico is a boy in a sailor costume of 9 years old: spoiled and envious, rude to his friends, but on the necessary occasions, he shows his great sense of help and kindness and gets involved on funny adventures on the school or with his friends. Many times he drives his neighbor Don Moncho angry, and his mother, Doña Carlota who runs a corner shop. Federrico is also in love with his teacher, a very beautiful lady. His name comes from his father who died. Don Federico, who was a sailor, who died when his ship sank in the high seas.
