= Don Ramón =

Mexican sitcom character

- El Chavo del Ocho character
- Don Ramón from El Chavo del Ocho
- First appearance: El ropavejero (1972); Los globos (Ballooney) (2006, animated series)
- Last appearance: Que bonita vecindad (1982); Historias de amor II (Love Stories II) (2014, animated series)
- Created by: Roberto Gómez Bolaños; Ramón Valdés
- Portrayed by: Ramón Valdés
- Voiced by: Mario Castañeda (El Chavo Animado); Doug Erholtz (El Chavo Animado; English dub) Carlos Seidl (Brazilian dub)

In-universe information
- Nicknames: Monchito; Ron Damón; Madruguinha (Brazilian dub)
- Species: Human
- Gender: Male
- Occupation: None; Shoemaker (formerly); Carpenter (formerly); Boxer (formerly); Mechanic (formerly); Barber (formerly); Street vendor (formerly); Photographer (formerly); Milkman (formerly)
- Family: Unnamed Wife (deceased); Malicha (goddaughter); Don Jacinto (deceased uncle); Don Román (cousin); Doña Nieves (grandmother); Aristócratas de Celaya, Guanajuato (aunts)
- Children: La Chilindrina
- Home: Flat N° 72 of the neighborhood
- Nationality: Mexican

Don Ramón is a Mexican fictional character from the Mexican television sitcom series El Chavo del Ocho, played by the Mexican actor Ramón Valdés. He is an unemployed widower who lives in flat no. 72 in Chavo's neighborhood, owned by Señor Barriga. He is the father of La Chilindrina and grandson of Doña Nieves.

The character was played by Valdés from 1972 to 1979, with the actor leaving the cast at the beginning of the last season and being replaced by the characters Doña Nieves and Jaimito, having a brief comeback between 1981 and 1982 when El Chavo del Ocho returned as a sketch within the Chespirito show.

== Concept and creation ==
The character originally debuted in a sketch on the Chespirito program in 1972 entitled "El Ropavejero", initially having been an improvised character who wore a yellow t-shirt and a black Basque-style beret, in addition to living in flat No. 14, which would later become Doña Florinda's house. In the following episode the character began wearing his iconic blue bucket hat and in the third episode was his first appearance with his black t-shirt. According to an interview conducted by Valdés' son, it was revealed that much of the character was based on the life of his own actor, who was also grumpy at home, even using his iconic catchphrases before playing the character and had different jobs when he was younger, in addition, even his look consisted of clothes that he himself carried from his house to the studio, carrying cigarettes in his pocket due to his lifelong smoking habit, in addition to mentioning that Valdés had several debts to pay before his fame.

== Biography and fictional personality ==
Don Ramón is a widowed man from Chihuahua. His unnamed wife died during the birth of his daughter, the scandalous but likable Chilindrina. He lives in the apartment complex of El Chavo del Ocho, in flat No. 72 (in the animated series he lives in No. 10).

Throughout his life he had different trades and sports (or claims to have played them). It is known that he was a boxer, American footballer, bullfighter, guitarist, singer, musician, master builder, etc., subjects on which he enlightens the children of the neighbourhood. He regularly carries out various jobs, usually related to everyday trades: plumber, cobbler, carpenter, plasterer, balloonist, mechanic, churro seller, hairdresser, gardener, clothes seller, milkman, etc.

He is charismatic and kind-hearted, but with an explosive character and is very strict with his daughter Chilindrina. He is easily irritable with children; among other things, he is annoyed when Chavo makes fun of him for being skinny and thinks he is old. He physically reprimands Chavo, Quico and La Chilindrina when they get into mischief, which causes him to be unjustly accused by Doña Florinda of trying or having done something bad to Quico, when in fact it was someone else's fault (on almost all of Chavo's occasions), and violently reprimanded with a slap or even a severe beating offstage, which leaves him very hurt without Doña Florinda allowing him to explain what happened (there were times when Doña Florinda did allow him to explain and others when Quico did clarify that it was Chavo or someone else who caused his sadness and not Don Ramón, although in all situations she ended up slapping him). Many times, after slapping him, Doña Florinda ends up telling Quico: "¡Vámonos, tesoro! No te juntes con esa chusma", and Quico then throws him in the chest saying: "Chusma, chusma" (as if he had been responsible and without ever making it clear to his mother that he was not) and then, on some occasions, Doña Florinda tells him: "And next time, go to (...) to your grandmother". After this, he gets angry by throwing his hat on the floor and most of the time Chavo asks him something about his grandmother in relation to what Doña Florinda told him, which causes him to angrily slap Chavo and say: "Pe-pe-pe-pe-pe..." (mimicking Chavo's crying) and I won't give you another one because...". However, despite the enmity that characterises them both, there are special occasions when they forget their differences.

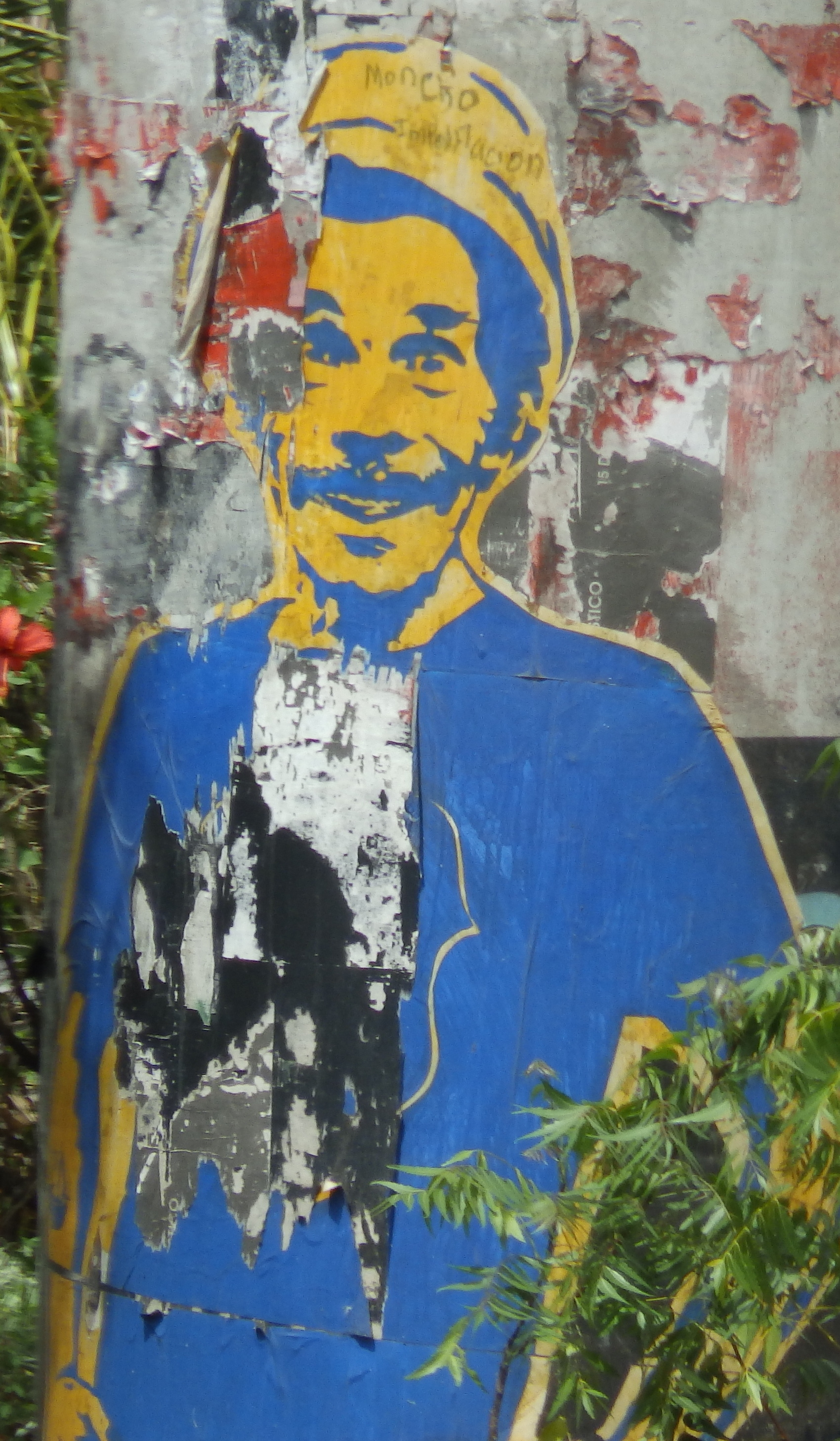
Sticker of Ramón Valdés dressed as Don Ramón

Neither has a very good relationship with Señor Barriga, the owner of the village in which he lives to whom he always owes fourteen months' rent and therefore avoids him as much as possible, looking for ways to escape from him like when he comes to knock on his flat and leaves through the window without him seeing him, or sometimes distracts him with other subjects so that he does not charge him the rent, as in an episode where he says that he supports Monterrey (Señor Barriga's favourite football team). On occasion, however, Don Ramón tries to pay off part of his debt through temporary maintenance work in the neighbourhood, which becomes the theme of every episode (and which ends up getting him into trouble due to Chavo's meddling). On extraordinary occasions he has managed to get money to pay at least a month's rent, as on one occasion; after a great ordeal when he lost the envelope of money and Señor Barriga took all the furniture out of Don Ramón's house, believing it to be another lie of his. Despite this, they are not enemies, as when Barriga is not antagonizing Ramón by demanding money for back rent, they both interact as good friends, and it has been revealed that Barriga frequently pressures Ramón to continue looking for work as revealed in the second part of "El desalojo de Don Ramón". In the third-season episode of El Chavo Animado, "No te vayas, Ñoño", Don Ramón is happy to hear that Señor Barriga is moving out, until Doña Florinda reminds him how good Señor Barriga has been to him for not kicking him out even though he owes him fourteen months' rent, and to scare him she told him that the new owner of the neighbourhood will kick him out.

In contrast, Doña Clotilde is in love with Don Ramón and constantly harasses him. He does not reciprocate and runs away from her, but maintains a good relationship with her, accepts gifts and food she gives him, and also scolds the children when they call her "witch". He also tends to get along well with Professor Jirafales, however, he is sometimes humiliated and even beaten by the professor (almost always for defending Doña Florinda or Quico).

One of his characteristics is that despite his honesty, he shows an absolute lack of interest in work, which is shown through phrases such as: "There is no bad work... the bad thing is having to work" or "How could you think of waking me up at 10 o'clock in the morning?” His favourite football team is Necaxa in an episode from 1973 and another recorded in 1978.

It is not known what he does for a living, although it is mentioned that the "crisis" left him unemployed, in no episode is it known how he earns money for his living.

== Costumes ==
Don Ramón notably almost always wears a black, green or dark grey T-shirt, with a pocket on the left side of his chest (where he kept his cigarettes), trousers, white trainers and a light blue piluso hat (just like in the animated series). The fact that he always wore the same clothes was reflected by El Chavo, who in the episode "Fútbol Americano", when Don Ramón told Professor Jirafales that the children would not be motivated to play because "they had no love for the jersey", El Chavo replied to Don Ramón that it was obvious that he had a love for the jersey, since he always wore the same one. In the first appearances, the black T-shirt was replaced by a white, yellow or turquoise T-shirt. Also in the first episode, instead of the well-known piluso hat, he wore a Basque-style beret.

Don Ramón is the only character who required no costume, his clothes were all clothes that actor Ramón Valdés came to work from his house, the production only gave him the blue hat.

== Other appearances ==
After leaving El Chavo del Ocho, Ramón Valdés was invited by Carlos Villagrán in the 1980s to star alongside him in two of his TV series starring his character Quico (at the time renamed Kiko to avoid copyright issues with Chespirito), returning to play Don Ramón again in Federrico (where his name was changed to Don Moncho) and in the first episodes of ¡Ah qué Kiko! (having left the show due to health problems that resulted in his death in 1988).

The character was also mentioned in the 1994 film La Chilindrina en Apuros where Chilindrina mentions about her father's death, referencing Valdés' death.

Don Ramón returned to appear in the 2006 animated series El Chavo Animado, now being portrayed as a man who lives alone without the presence of his daughter who did not appear due to disputes over the character's ownership that occurred between Chespirito and María Antonieta de las Nieves in the 90s. In the English dub his name was changed to Mr. Raymond.

== In popular culture ==
- Chilean rock band Los Mox released the song "Ron Damon" as part of their album Vino Caliente, Tomo y se Fue. whose lyrics praise the character and point him out as an idol to be admired for his attitude towards life while the title of the song refers to the way he is called by El Chavo, who was never able to correctly pronounce his name.
- Don Ramón and Sr. Barriga appear in some episodes of the cartoon Sea Princesses as two fishermen.
- A YouTube poop music video released in 2011 titled "Seu Madruga Will Go On" went viral in the early 2010s being created by YouTuber Mestre3224 and made over the song "My Skateboard Will Go On" by Anamanaguchi, this video has received a cult status among the YouTube poop community.

== Reception and legacy ==
The character gained a cult status in Brazil (where he is known by the name of Seu Madruga) based on the high popularity of El Chavo del when it aired on TV in the country, most notably between the 1980s and 2010s, having been portrayed as the protagonist in memes, fangames, social media accounts, among other things, at the point where the character has spread throughout the country's pop culture. In 2010 a book about Ramón Valdés exclusively in Brazil was published under the title Seu Madruga: Vila e Obra (lit. Don Ramón: Village and Work) having been written by Pablo Kaschner as a way of paying homage to the actor and his character, sharing information about his life, curiosities, interviews and unpublished photos. Notably, many fans of the series have shown interest in the character because they identify with him. A psychologist highlighted the character's characteristic of constantly working different jobs throughout the episodes, claiming that many identify with Don Ramón's habit of constantly doing odd jobs for money and his difficulty in establishing a career. Don Ramón has been compared to the character Mussum from Os Trapalhões, because both were unlucky characters whose actors died prematurely, but who somehow captured the public's interest enough to be immortalized through memes, especially on the internet. Some people have also considered that Don Ramón is actually the real protagonist of the series, as most of the characters are somehow related to him and his departure from the series has reflected as a decline.

The character also left his mark in other Latin American countries. Argentine footballer Pablo Vicó received the nickname Don Ramón due to his resemblance to the character.

A scene starring the character in the second part of the episode Don Ramón en la Escuela became very popular among the fanbase where Ramón appears teaching children at the school where he draws a skull on the blackboard and warns the children that that symbol means danger while shouting "This Skull means danger! Dan-ger!" (¡Esta calavera significa peligro! ¡Pe-li-gro!). This line became highly popular on internet being used in several memes and YouTube poop videos.

One of the actor's sons, Esteban Valdés, has given interviews talking about his father and mentions that he still keeps the character's hat to this day.
