= Ramón Valdés =

Mexican actor (1924–1988)

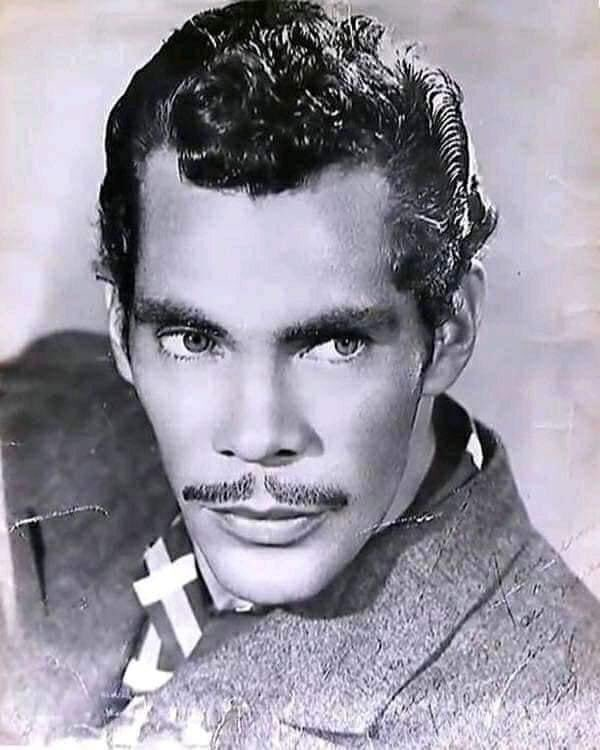
- Valdés, c. 1950s
- Born: Ramón Esteban Gómez-Valdés y Castillo; 2 September 1924; Mexico City, Mexico
- Died: 9 August 1988 (aged 63); Mexico City, Mexico
- Resting place: Mausoleos del Ángel, Mexico City
- Other names: Don Ramón; Monchito; Seu Madruga (Brazil); Mr. Raymond (English dub of El Chavo Animado)
- Occupations: Actor and comedian
- Years active: 1949–1988
- Notable work: Don Ramón in El Chavo del Ocho
- Children: 10
- Relatives: Germán Valdés (brother); Manuel Valdés (brother); Cristian Castro (nephew)
- Family: Valdés

Ramón Esteban Gómez-Valdés y Castillo (2 September 1924 – 9 August 1988) was a Mexican actor and comedian. He is best remembered for his portrayal of Don Ramón in the Mexican sitcom El Chavo del Ocho. He is also recognized as one of Mexico's best comedians.

Born in Mexico City, he was raised in a humble and large family that moved to Ciudad Juárez when he was aged two. Valdés made his acting debut at cinema in the movie Tender Pumpkins (1949), appearing along with his brother, Germán Valdés "Tin-Tan", and who introduced Ramón into the acting world. Under extra or supporting roles, he continued making appearances in films during the Golden Age of Mexican cinema. Ramón and Germán had two other brothers, Manuel "El Loco" Valdés and Antonio "El Ratón" Valdés, also comic actors.

In 1968, Valdés met Roberto Gómez Bolaños, better known as "Chespirito", with whom he began working on programs such as Los supergenios de la mesa cuadrada, Chespirito and El Chapulín Colorado. It was on Bolaños's El Chavo del Ocho that he gained international fame for his portrayal of Don Ramón. He left El Chavo del Ocho in 1979 but returned in 1981 for his final year on the project.

In 1982, Valdés starred with Carlos Villagrán on the Venezuelan sitcom Federrico and on Ah que Kiko in 1987.

== Life and career ==
=== 1924–1968: Childhood, early career and multiple films ===
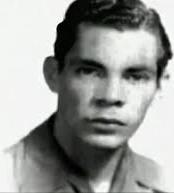
Valdés c. 1944

Ramón Esteban Gómez-Valdés y Castillo was born on 2 September 1924, in Mexico City, a son of Rafael Gómez-Valdés y Angellini and Guadalupe Castillo. He lived a quiet childhood, without being surrounded by many luxuries. He had several brothers, Germán Valdés "Tin-Tan", Manuel "El Loco" Valdés, Antonio "El Ratón" Valdés, Guadalupe, Angela, Cristóbal, Antonio and Armando. He was nicknamed "El Moncho". At the age of two, his family moved to Ciudad Juárez.

In his youth, Valdés earned his living in multiple activities and trades, and due to this instability, he sometimes faced economic problems. At the same time he began his artistic career thanks to the support of his brother Germán, who took him to act with him in different projects, so he participated in more than 50 films of the Golden Age of Mexican cinema. His film debut took place on Tender Pumpkins (1949). He continued appearing on multiple movies as an extra or with supporting roles till he met Roberto Gomez Bolaños (Chespirito) in 1968.

=== 1968–1980: Meeting with Chespirito and career success ===
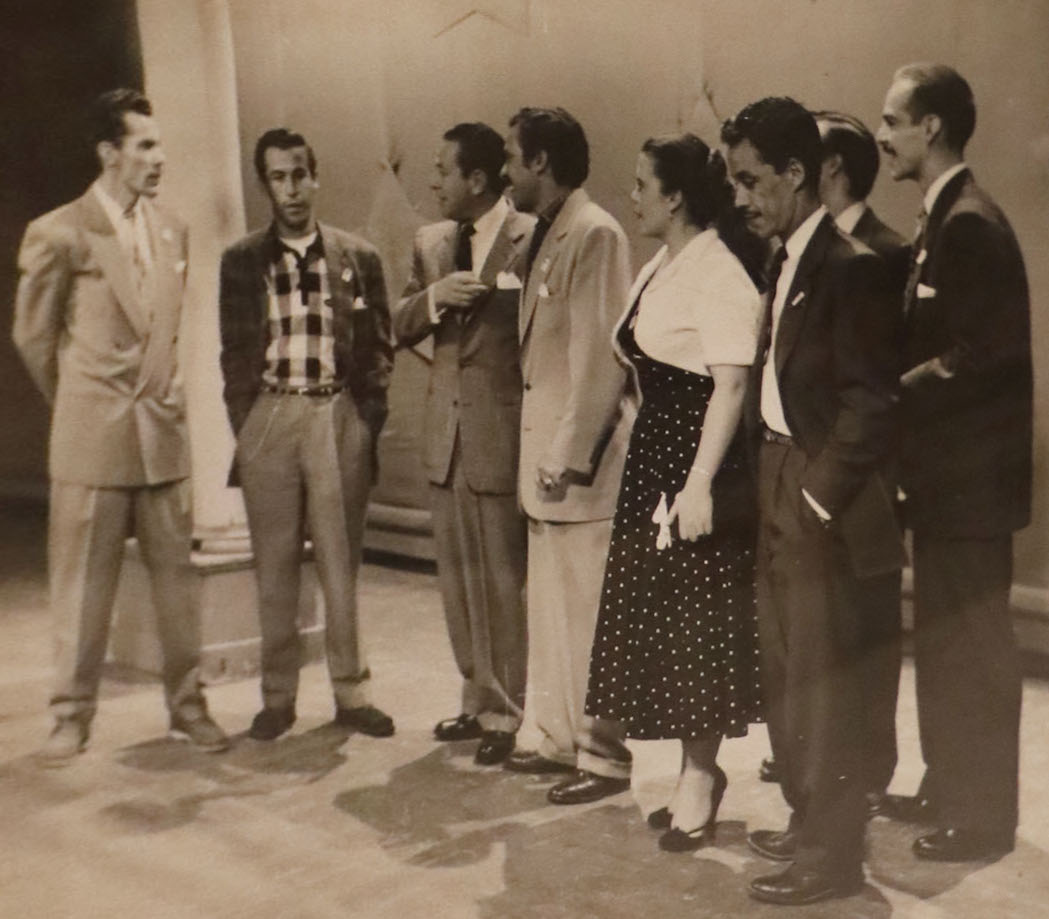
The Valdés brothers; Ramón (gray suit, first on the left), Antonio (plaid shirt), Germán (gray suit, center) and Manuel (black suit, last in the second row from the right) in 1958

In 1968, he met Roberto Gómez Bolaños (Chespirito) on the program Sábados de la fortuna, Bolaños saw the talent of Váldes and he made him part of the cast of comedians for his new television project called Los supergenios de la mesa cuadrada, where he performed along with María Antonieta de las Nieves and Rubén Aguirre. Then the program changed its name to Chespirito. It was so successful that it was on television for many years. Then came the television phenomenon El Chavo del Ocho in 1973, where he played Don Ramón, achieving more success and recognition than he had experienced before. It is said that his character was similar to Váldes in real life. Coworker Rubén Aguirre stated:

Ramón Valdés was hard to work with. There were always delays in the tapings because Don Ramón would be late.

He also participated in El Chapulín Colorado airing in 1973 in which he portrayed multiple characters.

=== 1980–1988: Return with Chespirito and final projects ===
After quitting the part of Don Ramón in El Chavo del Ocho, Valdés continued making films until 1986.

He returned to television in 1981, performing in "Chespirito" as his former characters. He also returned to "El Chavo del Ocho", this being kept as a secret until the moment of recording. According to the history behind his return on one of the episodes in the series, Váldes entered the set to surprise La Chilindrina (María Antonieta de las Nieves) and such was the surprise of the actress, that the tears shed during that scene were real. Valdés only stayed one more year in the production as at the end of that year he left the program forever.

In 1982, Valdés returned to television with Carlos Villagrán on the Venezuelan show Federrico and on ¡Ah qué Kiko! in 1987 with these two being his final projects.

== Other media ==
In 1984, Váldes starred in a musical program entitled "Aprendiz de Pirata" (Spanish for "Pirate Apprentice") with Luis Miguel in which he performed his song "Tú No Tienes Corazón" of his 1984 album Palabra de honor.

== Personal life ==
Valdés was a Roman Catholic of Spanish and Italian descent who owned a circus. According to Valdés, he had a falling out with Chespirito after he refused to lend Valdés 20,000 pesos he needed to buy a house.

Valdés had three wives with whom he had a total of 10 children. One of his wives was the singer Araceli Julián.

Valdés kept a strong friendship with Angelines Fernández, an actress on El Chavo del Ocho, better known on the show as Doña Clotilde "La Bruja del 71". At Valdés's funeral, Fernández stood in front of his coffin, crying inconsolably due to his death. Valdés was also good friends with María Antonieta de las Nieves. A persistent rumor remains that Fernández, who showed an unrequited strong romance for Valdés's character was actually in love with Valdés in real life, but this was denied by those close to them.

He was the uncle of Mexican pop singer Cristian Castro; his brother Manuel "El Loco" Váldes was Castro's father.

== Death ==
On 9 August 1988, Valdés died at the age of 63, after suffering a cardiac arrest caused by bone marrow cancer and prostate cancer. He was entombed at Mausoleos del Ángel in Mexico City.

== Legacy ==
Valdés is remembered as one of the most beloved actors from El Chavo del Ocho for portraying Don Ramón.

=== Posthumous documentary ===
On 17 May 2019, a trailer on Valdés' official YouTube account was released for Con permisito dijo Monchito (Spanish for, Excuse me, said Little Moncho), a documentary featuring Valdés's life with unpublished material, interviews with fans and co-workers and little known things about him.

== Filmography ==
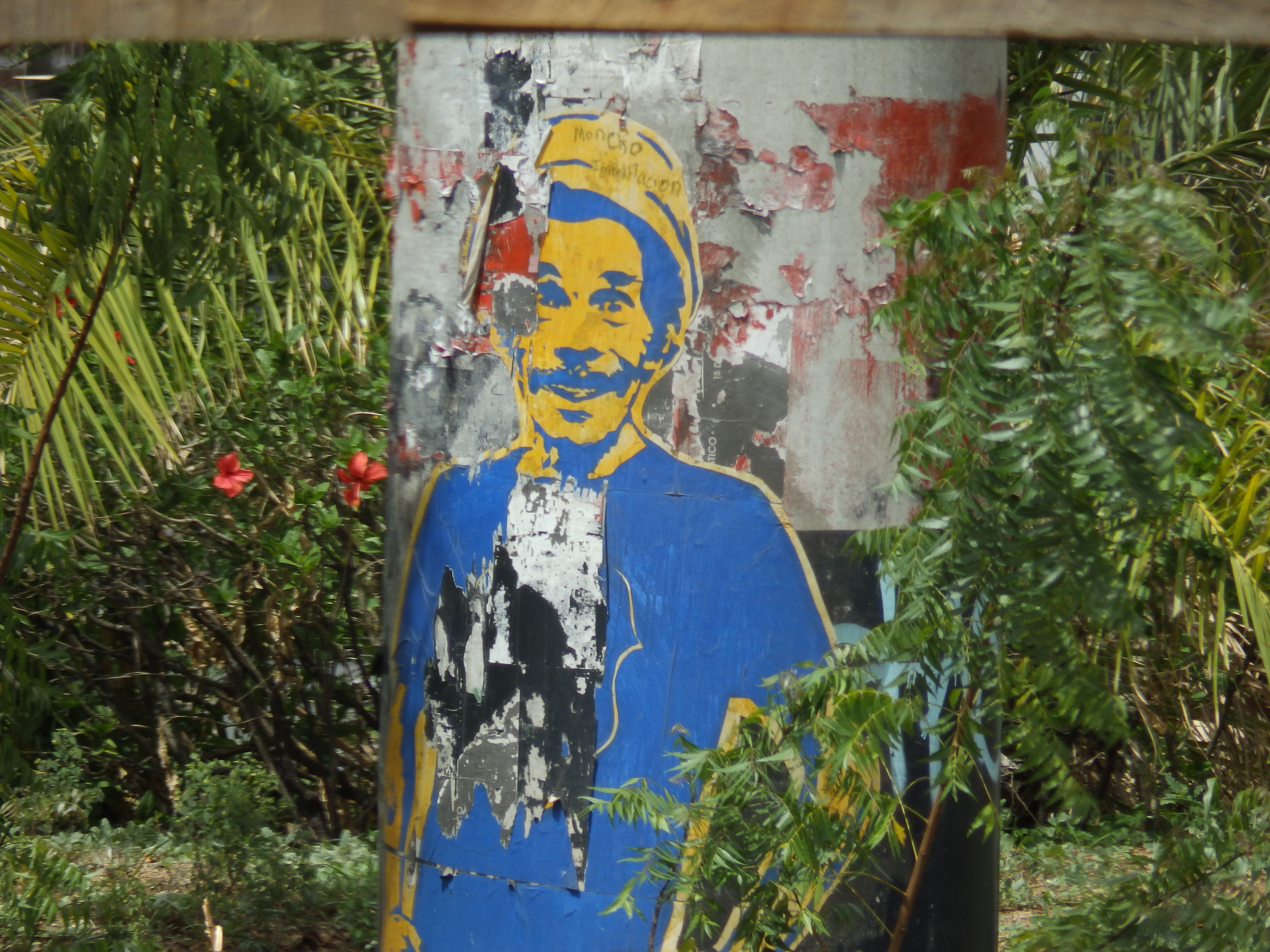
Graffiti of Valdés as Don Ramón, located in Managua, Nicaragua

=== Film ===
Year	Title	Role	Notes
1949	Tender Pumpkins	Willy	
1949	Soy charro de levita	Don Primitivo	Uncredited
1949	Novia a la medida	Amigo de Rafael	Uncredited
1950	The King of the Neighborhood	El Norteño	
1950	The Mark of the Skunk	Guardia	Uncredited
1950	Simbad el mareado	Hampón con lentes	Uncredited
1950	El Revoltoso	Detective	Uncredited
1951	Oh Darling! Look What You've Done!	Panadero	Uncredited
1951	Kill Me Because I'm Dying!		Uncredited
1952	Las locuras de Tin Tán	Detective	Uncredited
1952	The Beautiful Dreamer	Cavernario	Uncredited
1953	You've Got Me By the Wing	González	Uncredited
1953	The Vagabond		
1953	God Created Them	Ramón; Otto	
1953	The Unknown Mariachi	Detective	Uncredited
1954	Mulata	Marinero	Uncredited
1955	Escuela de vagabundos	Taxista	Uncredited
1955	La vida no vale nada	Chófer de autobús	Uncredited
1956	Una movida chueca		
1956	Pura vida	Caimán	Uncredited
1956	El sultán descalzo	Vendedor de tacos	Uncredited
1956	El vividor	El norteño	
1956	Botas de oro		Uncredited
1956	El inocente	Mecánico	Extra
1957	Las aventuras de Pito Pérez	Trailer	
1957	Los tres mosqueteros y medio	Rochefort	
1958	Escuela para suegras	Albañil	Uncredited
1958	Refifi entre las mujeres	Empleado de don Luis	Uncredited
1958	A Thousand and One Nights		
1958	La odalisca nº 13		
1959	Tres lecciones de amor	Tijerino, jefe de policía	Uncredited
1959	El cofre del pirata		
1959	Escuela de verano	Anastacio	
1959	Vivir del cuento	Dos pisos	Uncredited
1960	Variedades de medianoche	Flaco, empleado televicentro	Uncredited
1960	Tin Tan y las modelos	Cocodrilo	Uncredited
1960	Una estrella y dos estrellados	Hipólito, mesero	
1960	The Phantom of the Operetta	Policía	Uncredited
1961	El pandillero	Locutor	
1961	El duende y yo	Ramón, borracho en cantina	
1961	Viva Chihuahua		
1961	Escuela de valientes	Andrés, caporal	Uncredited
1961	Los inocentes		
1961	Juventud rebelde	El ratas	Uncredited
1962	El tigre negro	Bandido	Uncredited
1962	El malvado Carabel	Tendero	
1962	El centauro del Norte		
1962	Cazadores de asesinos	Bandido	Uncredited
1962	Dinamita Kid	Damián	Uncredited
1962	Los valientes no mueren		
1962	¡En peligro de muerte!	Hillbilly	
1962	Ruletero a toda marcha	Juez registro civil	Uncredited
1963	Los Amigos Maravilla en el mundo de la aventura		Uncredited
1963	El tesoro del rey Salomón	Alí Ben	
1963	Vuelven los Argumedo		Uncredited
1963	Fuerte, audaz y valiente		
1963	Entrega inmediata	Original XU 777	
1964	Buenos días, Acapulco	chofer gangoso de Ricardo	
1964	Vivir de sueños		
1964	La sonrisa de los pobres		
1964	Mi alma por un amor	Director de cine	
1964	Héroe a la fuerza	Papá de Caín y Abel	
1964	Campeón del barrio	Gancho	
1965	El amor no es pecado	Don Cosme	
1965	El padre Diablo		
1965	Diablos en el cielo		
1965	Mi héroe		
1965	El pecador	Mesero Juan	
1965	El rifle implacable	Roque	
1965	Tintansón Crusoe	God Mio Mao	
1965	Los fantasmas burlones	Empleado carnaval	
1965	El señor doctor	Paciente Vendado	Uncredited
1966	El tragabalas	Soldado	
1966	El falso heredero	Joselito el vagabundo	
1966	Cada quién su lucha	Malhechor, Badín's Henchman	
1966	Tirando a gol	Juez registro civil	
1966	¡Viva Benito Canales!	Lencho	Uncredited
1966	Cargamento prohibido	Hombre en cabaret	Uncredited
1966	El ángel y yo	Chilaquil	
1966	El indomable		
1966	La cigüeña distraída	El Flaco, ladrón	
1967	Crisol	Efrain	
1967	Retablos de la Guadalupana		
1967	El pícaro		
1967	Un par de roba chicos	Robachico	
1968	El caudillo		
1968	Corona de lágrimas	Conductor del camión de gas	Uncredited
1969	Cuernos debajo de la cama	Detective	
1969	Duelo en El Dorado	Esbirro de Poveda	Uncredited
1969	El aviso inoportuno	El sastre	
1970	Gregorio y su ángel		
1970	Los juniors		Uncredited
1970	El cuerpazo del delito	El gordo	(segment "La rebelde")
1970	La hermanita Dinamita	Conductor de ambulancia	
1970	El capitán Mantarraya	El Ingeniebrio	
1970	Chanoc en las garras de las fieras	Don Arturo	
1970	¡Ahí, madre!	Entrenador de futbol	
1971	El profe	Papá de Martín	Uncredited
1971	Los Beverly del Peralvillo	Cliente afeminado taxi	
1972	Chanoc contra el tigre y el vampiro	Pata larga	
1972	Hijazo de mi vidaza		
1973	Entre pobretones y ricachones		Uncredited
1973	Chanoc y las tarántulas		
1974	Algo es algo dijo el diablo		
1975	Chanoc en el foso de las serpientes	Tsekub Baloyán	
1977	Chanoc en la isla de los muertos	Tsekub Baloyán	
1979	El Chanfle	Mr. Moncho Reyes	
1979	En esta primavera		
1979	Chanoc en el circo Unión	Tsekub Baloyán	
1979	El secuestro de los cien millones		
1981	OK Mister Pancho	Gran Jefe Chivo Loco	
1983	Los gatilleros del diablo		
1984	Luis Miguel, aprendiz de pirata		Short
1986	El más valiente del mundo		Final film role

=== Television ===
Year	Title	Role	Notes
1968	Los supergenios de la mesa cuadrada	Ramon Valdés y Tirado Alanís	And other characters
1970–1973; 1981–1982	Chespirito		Various characters
1973–1979	El Chavo del Ocho	Don Ramón	
1973–1979	El Chapulín Colorado	Súper Sam; Tripaseca; Rascabuches; Alma Negra	And various other characters
1983	Federrico	Don Moncho	
1987–1988	¡Ah qué Kiko!	Don Ramón	Final TV appearance; show ended six months before Valdes' death
