= Noche de reyes =

Noche de reyes (Spanish, lit. 'Night of Kings', or 'Twelfth Night') may refer to:

== Film ==
- Noche de reyes (2001 film), a Spanish film directed by Miguel Bardem
- Noche de Reyes (1949 film), directed by Luis Lucia

== Television ==
- "Noche de reyes", a 2014 episode of TV series Velvet
- "Noche de reyes", a 1995 episode of TV series Aquí está la Chilindrina
- "Noche de reyes", a 1985 episode of TV series Barrio Sésamo

== See also ==
- Twelfth Night (disambiguation)
- Epiphany (holiday)
