= Aquí está la Chilindrina =

1994 Mexican TV series

- Genre: Sitcom; Comedy
- Created by: Antonio Monsell
- Starring: María Antonieta de las Nieves; Luis Bayardo; Lupita Sandoval; Cecilia Romo; Lili Inclán; Gabriel Fernández; Yolanda Mérida
- Country of origin: Mexico
- Original language: Spanish
- No. of seasons: 1
- No. of episodes: 17

Production
- Running time: 30 minutes

Original release
- Network: Televisa
- Release: July 13, 1994 – January 6, 1995

Related
- El Chavo del Ocho; La Chilindrina en apuros

Aquí está la Chilindrina is a Mexican television series produced by the Mexican television network Televisa in 1994 and had La Chilindrina as the main character from the series El Chavo del Ocho by Roberto Gómez Bolaños. The series is a spinoff to El Chavo del Ocho, being directed and produced by Rubén Aguirre, who had previously worked with María Antonieta on the series by Roberto Gómez Bolaños. There were only 17 episodes, all recorded in 1994. Televisa channels 4, 5 and 2 rerun the program until 2002 (8 years), always guaranteeing good ratings. Four months of recording that yielded 8 years of success. The cancellation was made by Roberto Gómez Bolaños, in view of his dispute with María Antonieta for the copyright of the main character, La Chilindrina.

== Synopsis ==
In this program, La Chilindrina is an 12-year-old orphan girl (younger than El Chavo), who was left in a convent by her great-grandmother, Doña Nieves, who left her there because she was no longer able to take care of her. The nuns, not knowing what to do in the face of this situation, decide to adopt the girl, who starts to live in that convent, and causes a lot of confusion there.

== Cast ==
- María Antonieta de las Nieves as La Chilindrina
- Luis Bayardo as Padre Filemón Luna
- Lupita Sandoval as Sor Beba
- Cecilia Romo as Sor Gertrudis
- Lili Inclán as Sor Momicia
- Gabriel Fernández as Benito
- Paty Strevel as Sor Vero
- Federica Fogarty as Sor Meche
- Yolanda Mérida as Madre Superiora
- Carolina Guerrero as Monja
- Keyko Durán as Sor Dina
- Graciela Estrada as Sor Tilejia

== Episode list ==
Note that none of these episodes of this series have ever been dubbed into Brazilian Portuguese or English since then, in addition to these Spanish titles being translated into English for others to understand the latter language in that list, possibly.

Original title	Translated title	Release date	Notes
"Piloto"	"Pilot"	1993	This was the pilot program for the series. It was not shown on television, but was made available on Maria Antonieta de las Nieves' official YouTube channel, "La Chilindrina TV".
"La llegada de la Chilindrina"	"The Arrival of Chilindrina" (or "Chilindrina's Arrival")	July 13, 1994	
"Noche de espantos"	"Night of Frights" (or "Frights' Night")	July 20, 1994	
"Qué viva el circo"	"Long Live the Circus"	July 27, 1994	On December 30, 1994, this same episode was re-aired, and it appears that a new episode did not arrive in this series until January 6, 1995, the day the last episode of this series premiered ("Noche de reyes").
"Las clases en el convento"	"Classes at the Convent"	August 3, 1994	
"Futbol chilindrino"	"Chilindrino Soccer"	August 10, 1994	
"No queremos a Peluchín en el convento"	"We don't want Peluchín in the convent"	August 17, 1994	
"Noche de brujas"	"Witches' Night"	August 24, 1994	
"La Chilindrina se va a la escuela"	"Chilindrina Goes to School"	August 31, 1994	
"La ganadora de la mejor receta de repostería"	"The Winner of the Best Pastry Recipe" (or "The Winner of Best Baking Recipe")	September 14, 1994	
"El conde Drácula"	"The Count Dracula" (or "Count Dracula")	September 21, 1994	
"La Chilindrina Cenicienta"	"The Chilindrina Cinderella" (or "Cinderella Chilindrina")	September 28, 1994	
"El ratero en el convento"	"The Thief in the Convent"	October 5, 1994	
"La posada"	"The Inn" (or "The Party")	December 16, 1994	
"Navidad"	"Christmas"	December 23, 1994	
"Noche de reyes"	"Twelfth Night" (or "Kings' Night")	January 6, 1995	
