= La Chilindrina en apuros =

1994 Mexican comedy and adventure film

- Release poster
- Directed by: Juan Antonio de la Riva
- Written by: José Luis Carreño; Francisco Sánchez
- Produced by: Televicine
- Starring: María Antonieta de las Nieves; Lorena Velázquez; Isaura Espinoza; Lili Inclán
- Release date: 23 December 1994
- Running time: 98 minutes
- Country: Mexico
- Language: Spanish

La Chilindrina en apuros (Spanish: Chilindrina in trouble) is a 1994 Mexican comedy and adventure film directed by Juan Antonio de la Riva, co-written by José Luis Carreño and Francisco Sánchez, and starring María Antonieta de las Nieves, Lorena Velázquez, Isaura Espinoza and Lili Inclán.

== Plot ==
La Chilindrina (María Antonieta de las Nieves), a girl from a vecindad in Mexico City, known for her mischievous behavior in the sitcom El Chavo del Ocho, travels to a city on the west coast of Mexico to claim a jewel that she inherited from a distant relative. She is accompanied by her great-grandmother, Doña Nieves, another character from El Chavo also portrayed by De las Nieves. During the trip, Doña Nieves gets lost and La Chilindrina must continue on her own, discovering that one of her distant uncles, a clumsy gangster-like man, has stolen the jewel she is claiming.

== Cast ==
- María Antonieta de las Nieves as La Chilindrina/Doña Nieves
- Jorge Russek as Father Casemiro
- Lorena Velázquez as Doña Aldonza
- Pedro Romo as Don Coglione
- Isaura Espinoza as Sor Severa
- Chabelo as a boy named Chabelo
- Roberto "Puck" Miranda as Apolonio Buenrostro
- Luis de Icaza as Taras
- Lili Inclán as Sor Momicia
- Claudia Goytia as Sor Vero
- Gabriel Fernández Carrasco as Licenciado Correcto
- Sergio Jurado as Pirrispis
- Francisco Javier Gómez as Third Sergeant
- José Rodríguez López as chauffeur
- Pedro Altamirano as Dulcero

== Reception ==
The film received mixed to negative reviews, with Spanish website FilmAffinity giving a score of 3,3 out of 40 reviews, with a critic arguing that De Las Nieves's age no longer fit the image of a mischievous girl. A more positive review is given by Spanish newspaper La Vanguardia with a score of 7.3/10.

== Legacy ==
In March 2023, Jerry Quiroz of Univision, wrote that the scene between De las Nieves and Chabelo, started rumors about a bad relationship between both, with subsequent events over the years confirming or contradicting this view. In a TV show by Verónica Castro, De las Nieves and Chabelo were invited to the program, at one point exchanging tongue-in-cheek and strong-worded "jokes" which appeared to be insults between both. However, their relationship improved by 2008, when they took part in a Children's Day show and in 2015, when De las Nieves attended the last emission of En Familia con Chabelo, of which Chabelo was host.

On that same note, Quiroz highlights that despite a rocky relationship between De las Nieves and Gómez Bolaños, she thanked him in the film's credits for granting character permission for her to portray La Chilindrina in the movie.
