= La Chilindrina =

Mexican sitcom character

- El Chavo del Ocho character
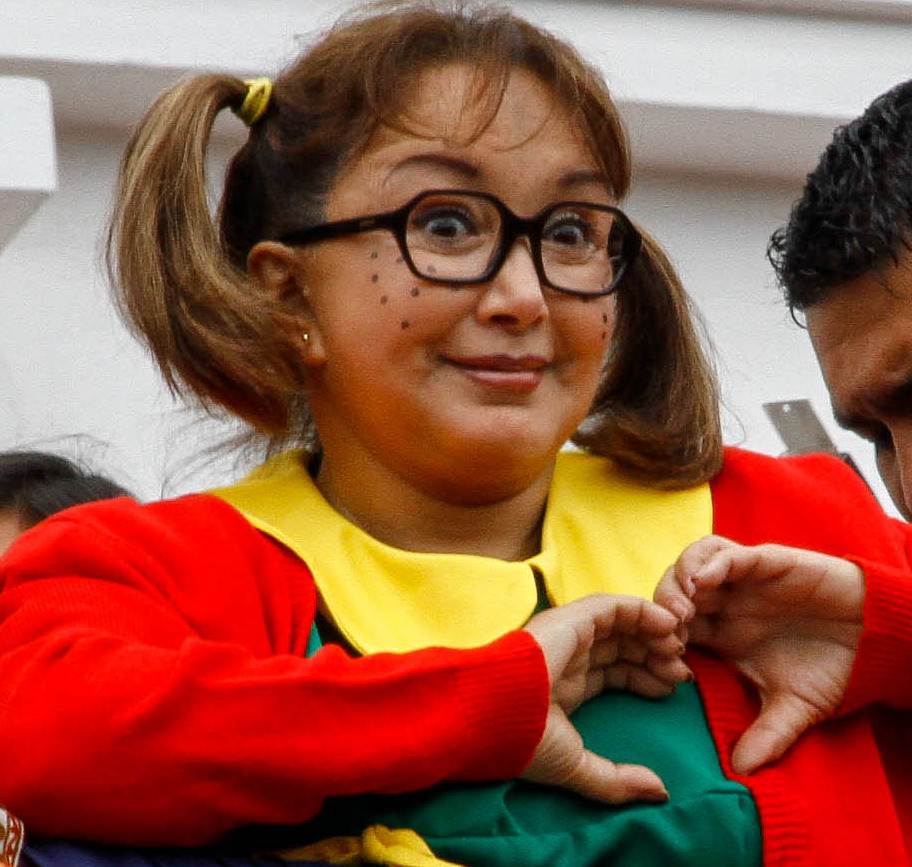
- De las Nieves as La Chilindrina in 2014
- First appearance: 1972
- Last appearance: 1992
- Created by: Roberto Gómez Bolaños
- Portrayed by: María Antonieta de las Nieves
- Motion capture: Paola Montes de Oca

In-universe information
- Species: Human
- Gender: Female
- Occupation: Student
- Family: Don Ramón (father); Doña Nieves (great-grandmother)
- Home: Flat N° 72 of the vecindad
- Nationality: Mexican

La Chilindrina is a fictional character of the Mexican television sitcom series El Chavo del Ocho. The single child of Don Ramón, she is a mischievous girl who can exhibit much empathy but also cold cleverness, often manipulating the other children and the adults alike to gain some benefit from a situation.

The character was portrayed by actress María Antonieta de las Nieves.

== Concept and creation ==
De las Nieves had met Roberto Gómez Bolaños in the late 1960s while she worked as a voice actress, dubbing the characters of numerous animated series like The Flintstones, I Dream of Jeannie, and The Adams Family, among others. In 1970, Gómez Bolaños asked de las Nieves to take part in his show Los Supergenios de la Mesa Cuadrada, sharing the cast of that programme with future El Chavo co-stars Rubén Aguirre and Ramón Valdés. The show ended in 1973 when El Chavo del Ocho took over as Gómez Bolaños' main production.

La Chilindrina was one of the most active characters in the series, missing only two years between 1973 and 1975. De las Nieves initially abandoned the show in its debut year due to her advanced 8-month pregnancy and was subsequently offered the chance of having her own TV show on Azteca Uno. She returned to El Chavo in 1975 and remained in the show until its end in 1992.

== Characterisation ==
La Chilindrina lives with her father, Don Ramón (portrayed by Ramón Valdés), in apartment 72 of the vecindad. The characters state that La Chilindrina's mother died while giving birth to her and that she was raised by her single father, often helped by his grandmother (La Chilindrina's great-grandmother, Doña Nieves, a character also played by de las Nieves). In order to justify de las Nieves's absence from the show after she left in 1973, Don Ramón says that she moved to Celaya, Guanajuato, to live with her aunts. The character returns in a 1975 episode titled El regreso de La Chilindrina (transl. La Chilindrina's Return) after sending a letter to Don Ramón and telling him that she was on the way back to Mexico City. La Chilindrina's absence was compensated by a similar character played by María Luisa Alcalá, who portrayed Malicha, a godchild of Don Ramón.

Although La Chilindrina shows empathy and kindness on numerous occasions, she also proves to be the cleverest among the children, often taking advantage of the other kids' vulnerabilities and childlike innocence to either gain something or evade responsibility for a mischief. Her manipulation sometimes extends to adults, although her deceiving skills are frequently noticed by those she tries to trick. La Chilindrina's callous behaviours include bullying other children, including Patty, Ñoño, La Popis, Godínez, and, most especially, Quico and El Chavo himself. In the case of her relationship with El Chavo, La Chilindrina shows intense but unreciprocal love feelings, sometimes displaying signs of infatuation as well as jealousy and narcissistic revenge as a consequence; for example, when El Chavo shows attraction for Patty and she is not able to regain his attention.

== Costumes ==
La Chilindrina's costumes varied greatly throughout the programme, both in El Chavo as an independent show as well as in the period of the show as a sketch of Chespirito. Her initial appearance in 1972 was an all-white costume, including a white dress, white shoes and white socks. Before leaving El Chavo for two years, the character used a stripped beige dress and also wore black shoes. Upon her return in 1975, La Chilindrina wore a lime green dress with a pocket on its side that had round black spots on it.

For a brief period between 1976 and 1977, La Chilindrina wore a green sweater crossed over her back, changing its colour to red in early 1977 and returning to white shoes. From 1980 onwards, the character's dress collar and pockets are yellow. The freckles for which she is known are bigger than usual in some episodes.

== Other appearances ==
Aside from the live-action El Chavo del Ocho, La Chilindrina was featured in McDonald's printed comics of the show. She was not included in the animated series El Chavo Animado because of copyright disputes between Gómez Bolaños and de las Nieves over the rights of the character of La Chilindrina.

In 1994, two years after the end of El Chavo del Ocho, the character debuted in cinema, featuring as the main character in the comedy adventure production La Chilindrina en apuros, where de las Nieves also portrays her great-grandmother Doña Nieves. The film received generally negative reviews from critics. That same year and ending in January 1995, the character had her own TV series on Televisa titled Aquí está la Chilindrina, consisting of one single season of 17 episodes. The series' plot follows La Chilindrina after she is left at an orphanage by Doña Nieves due to the elderly lady not being able to take care of her anymore. De las Nieves' co-star in Aquí está la Chilindrina was actor Luis Bayardo, who portrays Father Filemón Luna, a Catholic priest in charge of the orphanage.

After the death of Ramón Valdés in 1988, de las Nieves wrote an emotional song about Don Ramón, highlighting how much she (La Chilindrina) was going to miss him. After Valdés's death, La Chilindrina lived either alone or with her great-grandmother in apartment 14 of the vecindad.

In November 2021, the Guinness World Records inducted de las Nieves in their edition for being the actress "portraying the same role for the longest period of time (1971–2020)."

La Chilindrina was portrayed by actress Paola Montes de Oca in the HBO Max series Chespirito: Not Really on Purpose.

== Character's rights dispute ==
In 2001, Gómez Bolaños and Televisa filed a lawsuit against de las Nieves for continuing to play the character of La Chilindrina, with Gómez Bolaños claiming rights to the character and creation. However, after a 12-year legal battle, de las Nieves won full rights to La Chilindrina because Gómez Bolaños' brother, Horacio Gómez Bolaños, had not renewed his brother's right to La Chilindrina nor any other character of El Chavo before they expired.
