= List of El Chavo del Ocho characters =

The series' main characters in 1977. Left to right: Señor Barriga, Doña Florinda, El Chavo (center), Profesor Jirafales, la Chilindrina, Don Ramón and Doña Clotilde

El Chavo del Ocho, often shortened to El Chavo, is a Mexican television sitcom series created by Roberto Gómez Bolaños (Chespirito). The show was based on a series of sketches performed on Gómez's eponymous sketch show, Chespirito, which were first performed in 1972. El Chavo became its own series in 1973 and aired until 1980, becoming one of the most popular television programs in the world. Following its cancellation and the relaunch of Chespirito, the El Chavo sketches returned in 1980 and continued to be performed on Chespirito until 1992 when Gómez Bolaños, by this point in his sixties, discontinued them due to his advancing age.

The show follows the life and tribulations of the title character, a poor orphan child (played by Roberto Gómez Bolaños) that lives on a Mexican housing complex, typically called a vecindad. He is accompanied by a cast of neighbors, children, and other characters. All the characters, including the children, were played by adults on El Chavo.

== Summary ==
Character	Chespirito		El Chavo							Chespirito													El Chavo Animado						
Character	1972	1973	1	2	3	4	5	6	7	1	2	3	4	5	6	7	8	9	10	11	12	13	1	2	3	4	5	6	7
El Chavo	Main	Main	Main	Main	Main	Main	Main	Main	Main	Main	Main	Main	Main	Main	Main	Main	Main	Main	Main	Main	Main	Main	Main	Main	Main	Main	Main	Main	Main
La Chilindrina	Main	Main	Main		Main	Main	Main	Main	Main	Main	Main	Main	Main	Main	Main	Main	Main	Main	Main	Main	Main	Main							
Quico	Main	Main	Main	Main	Main	Main	Main	Main															Main	Main	Main	Main	Main	Main	Main
Don Ramón	Main	Main	Main	Main	Main	Main	Main	Main	Main		M	G											Main	Main	Main	Main	Main	Main	Main
Doña Florinda	Main	Main	Main	Main	Main	Main	Main	Main	Main	Main	Main	Main	Main	Main	Main	Main	Main	Main	Main	Main	Main		Main	Main	Main	Main	Main	Main	Main
Doña Clotilde	Main	Main	Main	Main	Main	Main	Main	Main	Main	Main	Main	Main	Main	Main	Main	Main	Main	Main	Main	Main	Main		Main	Main	Main	Main	Main	Main	Main
Señor Barriga	Main	Main	Main	Main	Main	Main	Main	Main	Main	Main	Main	Main	Main	Main	Main	Main	Main	Main	Main	Main	Main		Main	Main	Main	Main	Main	Main	Main
Profesor Jirafales		Main	Main	Main	Main	Main	Main	Main	Main	Main	Main	Main	Main	Main	Main	Main	Main	Main	Main	Main	Main	Main	Main	Main	Main	Main	Main	Main	Main
Doña Nieves							G		Main	Main	Main	Main	Main	Main	Main					Recurring									
Jaimito, el cartero									Main	Main		Main	Main	Main	Main	Main	Main	Main	Main	Main	Main		Main	Main	Main	Main	Main	Main	Main
Popis				Recurring	Recurring	Recurring	Recurring	Recurring	Main	Main	Main	Main	Main	Main	Main	Main	Main	Main	Main	Main	Main	Main	Main	Main	Main	Main	Main	Main	Main
Noño				Recurring	Recurring	Recurring	Recurring	Recurring	Main	Main	Main	Main	Main	Main	Main	Main	Main	Main	Main	Main	Main	Main	Main	Main	Main	Main	Main	Main	Main
Godínez				Recurring	Recurring	Recurring	Recurring	Recurring	Recurring	Main	Main	Main	Main	Main	Main	Recurring	Recurring	Recurring	Recurring	Recurring	Recurring	Main	Main	Main	Main	Main	Main	Main	Main

== Main characters ==
=== El Chavo ===
- Portrayed by Roberto Gómez Bolaños
- Years: 1972–1992

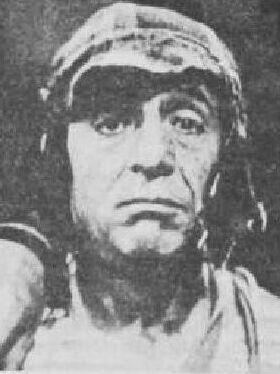
Roberto Gómez Bolaños dressed as El Chavo

El Chavo del Ocho is an 8-year-old orphan and the main protagonist of the series. "Chavo" is a Mexican Spanish slang for "kid" or "boy"; Chavo's real name is unknown. Generally, Chavo is very enthusiastic, creative and good-natured, but on the other hand he is also rather naïve and very gullible. He is not particularly bright (which Roberto Gómez Bolaños insinuated on the launch of the animated series may be a consequence of poor nutrition) and is remarkably clumsy, often hitting Quico, Don Ramón and Señor Barriga with balls, brooms, shoes, hammers, bricks, chairs and other objects. Chavo's typical attire consists of a green plaid baseball cap with ear flaps, a striped t-shirt, khaki shorts held up by a pair of orange suspenders he wears with both straps over one shoulder, and brown shoes without socks.

Chavo arrived at the neighborhood at the age of four and apparently lived in the apartment #8 with an elderly woman (who is never seen, but is mentioned in the novel El diario de El Chavo del 8). After her death, Chavo still lives in the apartment, although he spends most of his time inside an abandoned barrel that he calls his "secret hideout". He has a great craving for ham sandwiches, a popular kind of sandwich in Mexico. He has a big crush on Paty, along with his best friend and rival, Quico (which is their first fight over their crush, although she kisses Chavo in the animated series). Despite being a hungry 8-year-old child, he seems to have an incredible physical strength, since his punches are able to stun or even topple a full-grown man, mostly Don Ramón. One of his main traits is "the Garrotera" (Stiffs), in which his body tenses and 'shrinks' to become paralyzed after being frightened. The cure is being splashed with cold water. He has supposed friend called Chente, short for Vicente, but probably is just a imaginary friend. According to Chavo, looks a lot like himself.

In the English dub of the animated adaptation, he is voiced by Mona Marshall. Unlike in the original series and the original Spanish version of the animated series, instead of being called "Chavito", he is called "Chavorino" by his friends sometimes. Also, the "El" part of his name was officially removed from his character's bios in the animated series, possibly to keep in with the show's English production on Americanizing the series. Instead of ham tortas, he has a great craving for ham sandwiches, although the Christmas specials state that he also has cravings for jelly sandwiches for mysterious reasons, but those jelly sandwiches are actually ham tortas (ham sandwiches) in the original Spanish version, called jelly sandwiches in the English version. Also, his friend "Vicente" (or Chente) is renamed as Chova (switching the A and the O around).

In Brazil, his name was changed to Chaves, because the word chavo would not make sense in Portuguese. "Chaves" is a Portuguese-language surname, with a Spanish-language version, spelled Chávez.

=== La Chilindrina ===
- Portrayed by María Antonieta de las Nieves
- Years: 1972–1973, 1975–1980, 1980–1992

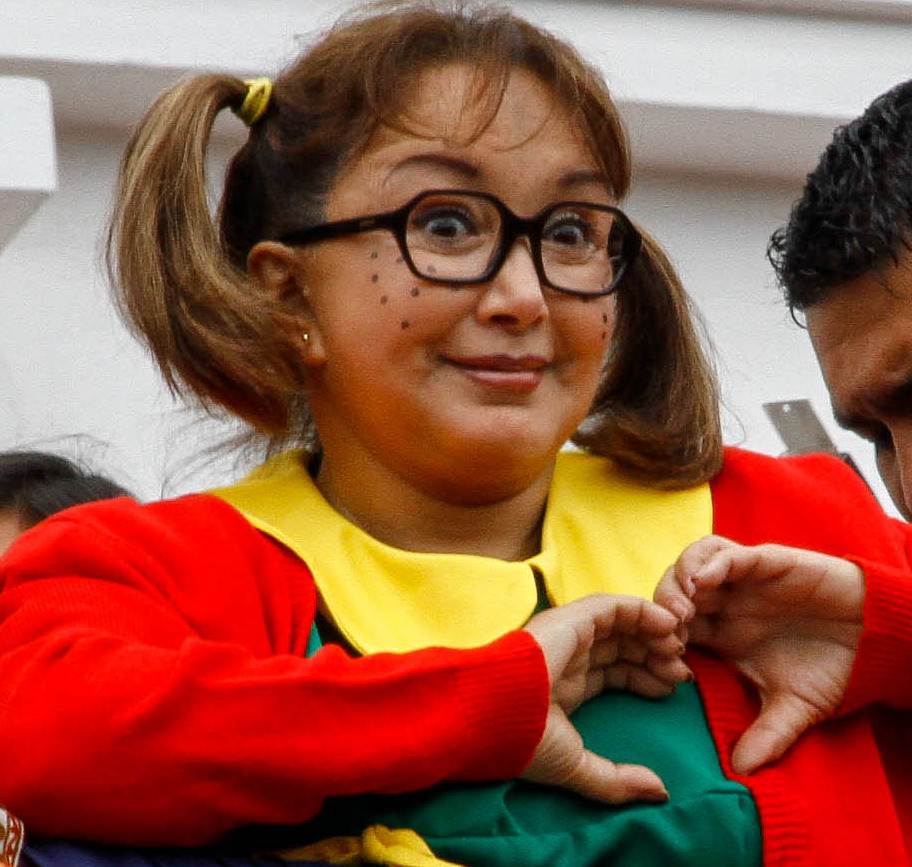
María Antonieta de las Nieves portraying la Chilindrina in 2014

La Chilindrina is the daughter of Don Ramón. "Precocious" is the best way to describe Don Ramón's intelligent and mischievous daughter, who likes to take advantage of her slow-witted friends to play pranks on them and take their toys or snacks. She lives in the apartment #72 with her father, Don Ramón. She usually wears a green dress, white shorts, and a red sweater that is always twisted on the back. She has freckles, horn-rimmed glasses, a missing front tooth, and two pigtails that are always uneven, one significantly higher than the other one, just like her socks. "Chilindrina" is the name of a typical Mexican bun, with brown sugar sparkles on top, reminiscent of the character's freckles. In early episodes, La Chilindrina used to have longer pigtails which were cut by El Chavo. In most episodes, she is seen to have a big crush on Chavo, and is very jealous of his crush on Paty.

La Chilindrina was not included in the El Chavo animated series due to legal disputes with Roberto Gomez Bolaños (creator of all El Chavo characters) and María Antonieta de las Nieves (Chilindrina's portrayer) about who owned the rights to the character and if the character was allowed to be used publicly outside of El Chavo. María Antonieta de las Nieves was able to win a legal battle over Chespirito in 2003, which gave her permission to act as La Chilindrina in public, and granted her rights over the character so that character is separated from the cast, but still be on it by the fans. For old episode remakes, Chilindrina's role in the animated version was primarily taken over either by La Popis (Phoebe) or Ñoño (Junior), the latter of whom came to have her same mischievous personality.

In Brazil, her name was changed to Chiquinha, a diminutive for Chica, which in turn is a nickname for Francisca.

=== Quico ===
- Portrayed by Carlos Villagrán
- Years: 1972–1978

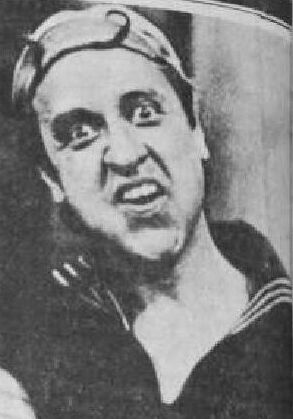
Carlos Villagrán dressed as Quico

Federico Matalascallando Corcuera (Frederiko Strumkiller Jr.) known as Quico, is a spoiled, greedy, overprotected 9-year-old boy, son of Doña Florinda and a late naval captain (also named Federico), who reportedly died when his vessel was attacked and, according to Quico, was eaten by a white shark. He lives in the apartment #14 with his mother, Doña Florinda. Being very arrogant, selfish, manipulative, and envious, he always wants to draw everyone's attention all to himself, either by screaming loudly or by showing off his newest toy. Because of this, he usually gets El Chavo in trouble when he does something wrong, especially to Don Ramón, after which Don Ramón hits El Chavo angrily on the head. Partially due to his mother's bad influence to him (and former wealth and status as the wife of a naval officer), he believes that he and his mother are superior to everyone else in the neighborhood. He still finds time to play with—as he and his mother call them – chusma ("rabble" or "riffraff"), namely Chavo, Chilindrina, and Don Ramón. However, Quico has proved many times to be Chavo's best friend and sometimes rival, often assisting him in Chavo's mischievous acts, as seen due to the fact that they are mostly seen playing together in the front yard, and that he was genuinely hurt when El Chavo left the neighborhood in the episodes "El Ratero de la Vecindad" and "El Billete de Lotería". Moreover, Quico is a good kid deep inside, even though there are several occasions in which he acts self-centered. Quico wears a rainbow-colored beanie cap, a dark blue naval officer's shirt with a red ascot, bright yellow socks he pulls all the way up to his knees, and white low-top shoes. He is also widely identified by his enormous cheeks, which he can puff out quite largely, and his minuscule intelligence, often responding to the Spanish words for idiot, stupid, dummy, etc. (he even displays delight about being called such things, oblivious to the fact that all these words are insults). Despite his stupidity, Quico displays more deceptive abilities and common sense than Chavo, and is the most likely to break the fourth wall (especially regarding that four of his quotes do this so). Often in the series, Quico mentions that he has or that his mom will buy him a "square ball" and in "Termina el Romance" he and El Chavo refused to help Profesor Jirafales reconcile with his mother due to Profesor Jirafales having promised to them a square ball. In 1979, when Carlos Villagrán permanently quit the show, Quico is said (in the episode named "El Cine") to have gone off to live with his rich godmother, reportedly "unable to stand the riffraff anymore." No one in the show ever talked about him afterwards, or said anything about his absence, as if he had never existed. Villagrán's character, Quico, starred in a rather short-lived spin-off series, ¡Ah qué Kiko! in the late 1980s, which attempted to revive the series using a "hip-hop" twist and gave Villagrán's character a slight wardrobe make-over.

In the English dub version of the animated series, the main role is sometimes as the antagonist, he is voiced by Doug Erholtz. Instead of being called "Tesoro" (treasure/darling), he is called "Muffin". His name was also retained in said dub, as well as in the official English subtitles for the Netflix print of the original.

=== Don Ramón ===
- Portrayed by Ramón Valdés
- Years: 1972–1979, 1981, 1982: Guest.

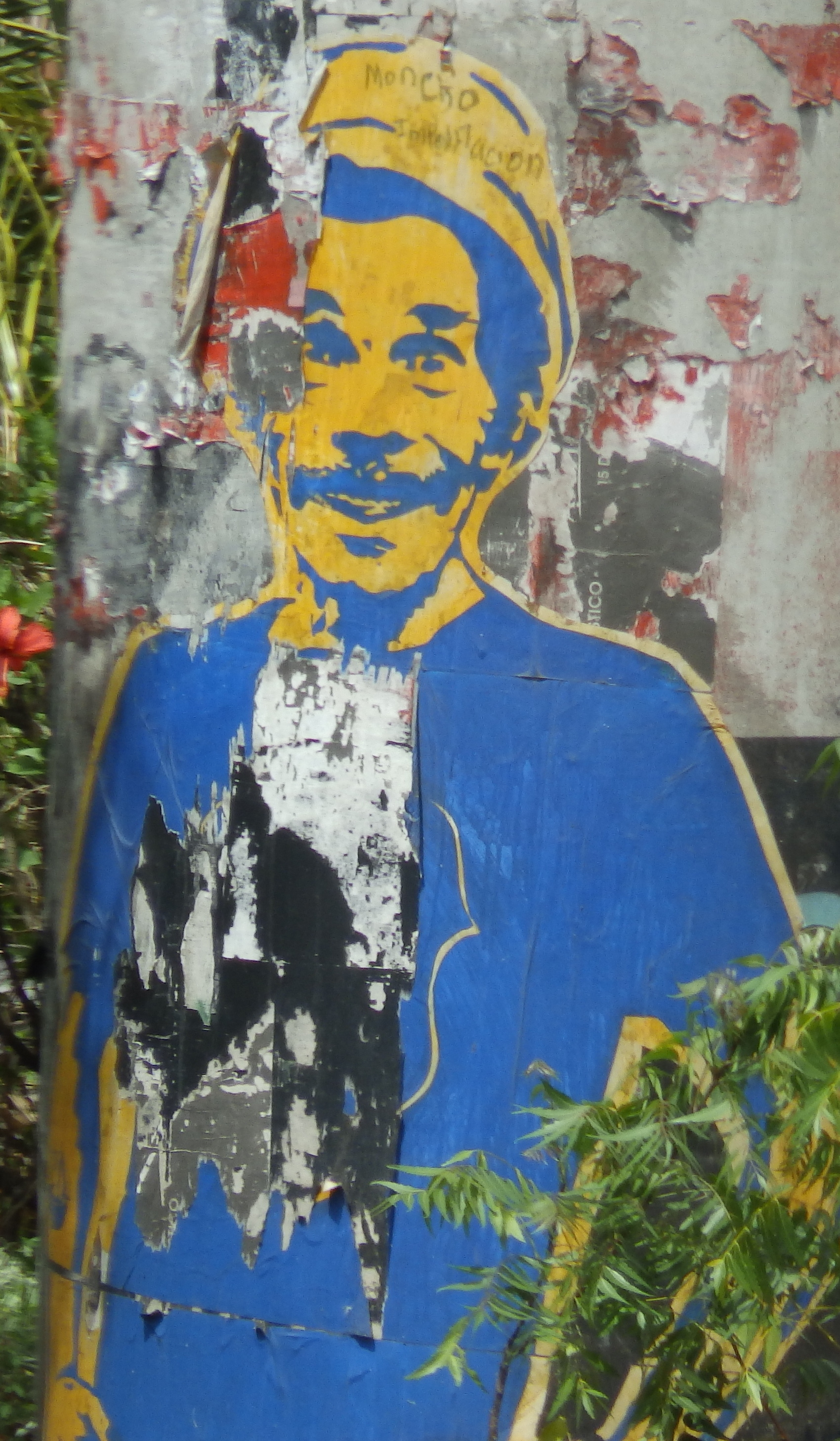
Sticker of Ramón Valdés dressed as Don Ramón

Don Ramón is an unemployed widower with an extremely lanky, nearly emaciated build. Sometime before the series started he was married to his wife and lived in the neighborhood together. As a result of the marriage they had their daughter, Chilindrina. But unfortunately, his wife died giving birth so Don Ramón was forced to raise his daughter alone the best he could. He lives in the apartment #72 with his daughter, Chilindrina. He has black wiry hair and a moustache and is usually seen wearing a sun hat, a T-shirt, and jeans. His greatest aspiration seems to be living an uncomplicated life, but in the vecindad, this seems impossible. He is constantly hounded for the rent which he has neglected to pay for fourteen months (a figure that seems to be static since Señor Barriga forgives several months of his rent in several episodes) – however, in some episode, he did pay at least one month of rent while on the verge of eviction from Señor Barriga. His daughter (Chilindrina) is a perennial headache and his neighbor Doña Florinda's response to any imposition on her lifestyle is a loud slap on his face, which causes him to spin in a circle. He eventually became something of a scapegoat for Doña Florinda's wrath, with her ending up slapping him in the face when he wasn't even present when something went wrong. Although rather high-strung and quick-tempered, Don Ramón manages to keep a fairly upbeat attitude and to (just barely) make a living doing odd jobs. He's also a fan of all sports and is somewhat knowledgeable in them (having demonstrated boxing, bowling, American football, baseball and even bullfighting – with a dummy bull – to the kids), but due to the kids' own shortcomings, he always comes up short. Chavo mispronounces his name as Ron Damón, that is a common way of spelling by children, though it seems that Don Ramón tolerates the mispronunciation as long as Chavo and other children don't give out several insults. One quote popularized by himself is "There is no bad work, the downside is having to work". He hails from Chihuahua and is a big fan of Necaxa, which in the day was generally known as a perennial mid-table also-ran, per Don Ramón's quote "Yo le voy al Necaxa", meaning that he neither wished for glory nor suffering. His personality of being a good-hearted and (not always) noble man, as well as acting as a surrogate father to El Chavo made Don Ramón one of the most cherished characters in the history of the show.

In Brazil, he is known as Seu Madruga (literally "Mr. Dawn") and is considered to be the most popular character, with some of his quotes used under many circumstances, not only the funny ones. An example is during the 2000s that was considered the peak of success of the character in the country, Don Ramón was often used heavily as an internet meme to the point of having several Orkut communities related to him and even fangames with him being the protagonist. In 2010, a book entitled "Seu Madruga: Vila e Obra" was published exclusively in Brazil in honor of the character and his actor showing curiosities, interviews and unpublished photos about Ramón Valdés.

In the English dub of the animated series, as well as in the official English subtitles for the Netflix print of the original, he was known as Mr. Raymond or nicknamed Rister Maymond by El Chavo and was voiced by Doug Erholtz.

=== Doña Florinda ===
- Portrayed by Florinda Meza
- Years: 1972–1991

Florinda Corcuera y Villalpando, Viuda de Matalas Cayando, commonly referred to as Doña Florinda, is the mother of Quico and love interest of Profesor Jirafales. Before the series started she was married to a naval officer named Don Federico and was very rich. As a result of their marriage, she gave birth to Quico. She became a widow when Quico was still young. Her late husband, after whom Quico was named, was a naval officer who died at sea. She lives in the apartment #14 with her son, Quico. It is often said by Quico that he descansa en pez (a pun on "rest in peace", literally meaning "rests in fish", indicating that he was swallowed by a shark). Her full name is Florinda Corcuera y Villalpando, viuda de (widow of) La Regueira. Doña Florinda sees herself as being socially, morally and economically superior to her neighbors (and, according to the book El Diario del Chavo del Ocho, she was indeed rich until the death of her husband, leaving her without a way to obtain money and eventually waste it, forcing her to move to the vecindad), and while not misanthropic, snobbish, or bully-like, she tends to give orders to the others, such as putting signs that ban animals and infants from the vecindad (much to Señor Barriga's chagrin, because she does it without his authorization). She is so fiercely protective of Quico that whenever he is upset, she'll beat up Don Ramón without seeking explanation. In fact, a recurring gag in the series is that she unfairly accuses him of "attacking" Quico and goes to slap him in the face, even when he is not present in the scene. When Carlos Villagrán left the show – thus concluding Quico's presence in the vecindad – she still slaps Don Ramón in the face, but less often. This is due to Don Ramón laughing loudly whenever a rude comment is directed towards her (mostly coming from El Chavo). She likes cleanliness and order and also likes to cook and for that reason becomes famous among her neighbors. Once she accepted a partnership selling churros (a fried pastry originating from Spain) with Don Ramón. She is easily recognized by the fact that she always keeps her hair in curlers (except in some early episodes), even at work or on vacation in Acapulco, Guerrero. In later episodes, she opens a restaurant called "Restaurante Doña Florinda". Derisively, the kids call her "Vieja Chancluda" ("vieja" being "old lady", and "chancluda" as someone who uses "chanclas", sandals).

In the English dub of the animated series, as well as in the official English subtitles for the Netflix print of the original, she is known as Mrs. Worthmore (a pun on worth more), and voiced by Kate Higgins (S1-2) and Laura Post (S3-7). Her restaurant was renamed "Mrs. Worthmore's Cafe" as well. In Brazil, her name was translated to Dona Florinda.

=== Profesor Jirafales ===
- Portrayed by Rubén Aguirre
- Years: 1973–1992

Profesor Inocencio Jirafales (Isaac Girafalde) is the schoolteacher. He is highly educated but naïve, although he carries on a ludicrously innocent relationship with Doña Florinda and patiently teaches way above the heads of his students. He is patient and professionally ethical. When angered, he loudly shouts "¡¡¡Ta-ta-ta-taaaaa-TA!!!". His last name is a reference to the tall Mr. Aguirre, who stood at a height of 2.03 m or 6 ft 8 in ("jirafa" is Spanish for giraffe; the closest English equivalent would be Giraffald). The children (and sometimes adults, most notably Don Ramón) refer to him as "Maistro Longaniza" (being "maistro" a mispronounced form of "maestro", an alternative for "profesor", both meaning "teacher", and "longaniza", a long kind of sausage). Although he appears throughout all the series (almost 20 years) having a romance with Doña Florinda, by the time it finished, neither one suggested the possibility of going beyond that idyllic relation – there's an in-joke among the series production that statizes his full name to be "Inocencio Jirafales", being "Inocencio" both a real-life name in Spanish and Portuguese-speaking countries and a play on "innocence", thus adding to the "innocent" way he treats his relationship towards Doña Florinda. Even though he claims to have a strong hatred of violence, Profesor Jirafales is much more than willing to beat up those whom he feels insult him or Doña Florinda. (in the episode in which Don Ramón teaches El Chavo some basic boxing classes and even lends his boxing gloves to the kid, Profesor Jirafales has beaten him so violently that even Doña Florinda displays disgust over it).

In the English dub of the animated series, and on the subtitles of the Netflix print of the original, he is known as Professor Girafalde (a pun on the word giraffe) or nicknamed Professor Sausage (Maistro Longaniza) or Professor Firehose (in the Fireman episode) and even Professor Drainpipe by El Chavo (sometimes called "Professor Girafalges" by non-marketing teams) and is voiced by Bob Buchholz.. In Brazil, his name is written Professor Girafales ("girafa" is Portuguese for giraffe) and nicknamed by the children as Professor Linguiça or Mestre Linguiça (being "mestre" an alternative for "professor" and "linguiça" meaning "sausage").

=== Doña Clotilde ===
- Portrayed by Angelines Fernández
- Years: 1972–1991

Doña Clotilde (erroneously called Doña Cleotilde by Don Ramón), sometimes referred to as "La bruja del 71", is a retired woman who often chases after Don Ramón. She lives in the apartment #71. Because she is old and somewhat eccentric, the kids think she is a witch, and refer to her as "The Witch from (Apartment) 71". Some of the adults also refer to her as that, often by mistake, due to the kids frequently calling her a "witch". She refers to herself as señorita (Miss) because she has never been married, which also she gets very upset by when called señora (Mrs.), meaning that she is a married woman. In one episode of the series, Chavo stated that "She's not a witch because if she were, she would use her magic to turn herself into a young, beautiful woman." She is a single woman, thirsty for love, and frequently seeks it with Don Ramón, who is a widower. Because she never wants people to know her real age, she is always saying the number of candles (40 candles) she had to use in her "last" birthday's cake (she never says to have more than 49) – even then, people never believe her, mostly because she also acts like a senior woman. She has always been in love with Don Ramón, her neighbor, but he finds her highly unappealing, so Doña Clotilde tries and does everything she can to conquer him like bringing him food from the store, buying him medicine when he can't sleep, making cakes and other foods for him, or lending him luggage. In fact, all the times that Don Ramón is "interested" in her is when she faints in the middle of the yard and was going to bring him something from the store or just when being polite with her is his only choice. When Ramón Valdés left the show, her affections turned towards Jaimito el cartero (the mailman). She is always dressed with a blue or pink hat (1950s style) with "leaves", blue gown, and black shoes. At times she had also a black sweater. Regarding her income, the source is unknown. Some might suggest she receives a pension, or maybe gets her money out of an inheritance, otherwise it would be impossible for her to pay the rent to Señor Barriga, pay her own expenses and buy all the things she gives to Don Ramón.

In the English dub of the animated series, and the official English subtitles for the Netflix print of the original, she was renamed Miss Pinster (a pun on the word spinster) or nicknamed The Witch of 71 by the children and is voiced in the animated series by Mona Marshall. In Brazil, her name is Dona Clotilde or Bruxa do 71.

=== Señor Barriga ===
- Portrayed by Édgar Vivar
- Years: 1972–1973, 1973–1979, 1980–1991

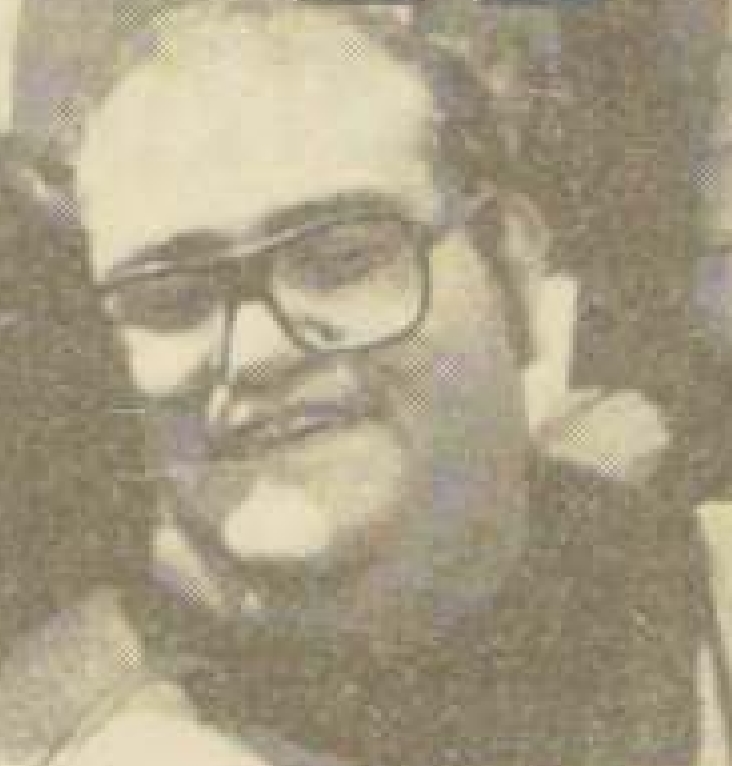
Édgar Vivar in 1977, wearing Señor Barriga's glasses

Zenón Barriga y Pesado is the landlord of the vecindad. Roberto Gómez Bolaños states that Señor Barriga prefers going personally to receive the residents' rents in order to save up his own time or a rent collector's salary. He is the owner of the vecindad and rarely succeeds in collecting rent from Don Ramón and is greeted upon his every arrival by being (accidentally) kicked, tripped, beaten, or hit by a flying object thrown by El Chavo. His last name is a reference to his obesity ("barriga" is both Spanish and Portuguese for "belly", but the surname actually exists). In two episodes throughout the series (the first when Don Ramón buys a bowling ball while working as a buyer/salesman of home antiques; the second when Doña Florinda first sets up a restaurant) his full name is revealed to be "Zenón Barriga y Pesado" ("Zenón" being a pun on "Cenón" ("dining man" or "big dinner"); while "Barriga y Pesado" literally means "Belly and Heavy", although Pesado is a real surname as well); Zenón is also the Spanish form of Zeno. He is also well known because of his patience with Don Ramón and his unpunctual rent payments and all the kids' (mostly Chavo's) misbehavior like punching him or nicknaming him (always making fun of his obesity).

In one episode, he follows through on his eviction threat to Don Ramón, but while he is packing his belongings, Chavo and Quico come across an old scrapbook with pictures of Don Ramón as a boxer in his younger years. Señor Barriga is overcome with emotion; as it turns out, he was heavily in debt and was about to go to jail when he desperately bet against Don Ramón in a boxing match, and won back enough money to clear his debts.

Even though he is the victim of Chavo's various pranks, he cares very deeply about him, even offering to take him to Acapulco instead of his son Ñoño, who is off on a camping trip with the Boy Scouts.

In the English dub of the animated series, as well as in the official English subtitles for the Netflix print of the original, he is renamed Mr. Beliarge (pun on the word belly and large) and is voiced by Dave Mallow. In Brazil, his name translates to Seu Barriga (literally "Mr. Belly") or Senhor Barriga.

=== La Popis ===
- Portrayed by Florinda Meza
- Years: 1974, 1975-1992

Doña Florinda's niece and Quico's cousin. Cutesy and dumb, Popis was usually only present in schoolroom scenes until after Quico left the series, when she filled in for his character in remakes of old episodes, living in the apartment #14 with her aunt, Doña Florinda.

She would frequently say "Acúsalo con tu mamá" ("Tell your mom on him") sometimes at inappropriate moments, known in the English dub of the animated series as "I'm telling...", such as when Profesor Jirafales told Quico that he gave the wrong answer. Whenever she says or does something wrong, she blames it on her doll, Serafina, which she loves as a daughter. Her attire was originally a pink dress with spotted blue dots, which was later changed to a green and pink dress.

In the English dub of the animated series, and in the official English subtitles for the Netflix print of the original, she is renamed as Phoebe, her doll is renamed as Stephanie. She is voiced by Kate Higgins (S1-2) and Erin Fitzgerald (S3-7) in the animated series.

She partially fills in for Chilindrina in the animated series, as Chilindrina never appears or is mentioned in the series.

=== Ñoño ===
- Portrayed by Édgar Vivar
- Years: 1974-1992

Pronounced NYO-NYO, as in yo-yo, Señor Barriga's son, he is as obese as his father, and thus is always the butt of the classroom's fat jokes. Ñoño was another classmate, but often appeared around the neighborhood if any scenes needed an extra kid. He is well-studied and good-hearted, but like most of the other kids, naïve to say the very least, so he is often taken advantage of. He also substituted for Quico in the later years.

A hard joke on him over his weight was one where Quico and Chilindrina have several balloons and Chavo, hidden in his barrel, burst the balloons first to make his friends angry at each other and then to make them cry. When Ñoño arrives, with balloons too, Chavo confuses him with a balloon and burst his belly making Ñoño to "burst" leaving only his clothes visible.

In the English dub for the animated series, as well as in the official English subtitles for the Netflix print of the original, he is renamed as Junior and is voiced by Yuri Lowenthal. In Brazil, his name was changed to Nhonho, a phonetic transcription of Ñoño for Portuguese.

He partially fills in for Chilindrina in the animated series, as Chilindrina never appears or is mentioned in the series.

=== Godínez ===
- Portrayed by Horacio Gómez Bolaños
- Years: 1974-1979, 1980-1985, 1989, 1992

An overall and baseball cap-wearing kid who usually keeps to himself and tries to dodge questions in the classroom so he can focus on drawing and playing musical instruments. Godínez is his surname; his given name is unknown. He seems to be a capable student but is totally uninterested, except when talking about soccer. Godínez only appears on rare occasions. Horacio Gómez directed the show for a short period. In real life, he was the younger brother of Chespirito, creator and writer of the series.

In the English dub of the animated series, as well as in the official English subtitles for the Netflix print of the original, he is renamed as Gordon. He is voiced by Kate Higgins (S1-2) and Erin Fitzgerald (S3-7) in the animated series. Like his Spanish counterparts, Gordon is funny and makes ridiculous remarks.

=== Jaimito, el cartero ===
- Portrayed by Raúl "Chato" Padilla
- Years: 1979-1980, 1980, 1982-1991

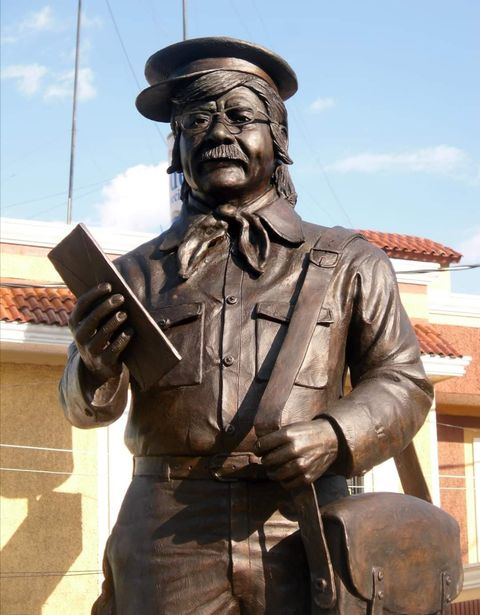
Statue of Raúl Chato Padilla dressed as Jaimito el Cartero in Tangamandapio, Michoacán

A sociable but very forgetful and negligent postal worker who only appears in a few of the last episodes and takes over for Don Ramón and Quico in the Chavo segments on the hour-long "Chespirito". Whenever he enters the vecindad, he is seen carrying an old bicycle, which he cannot ride because he couldn't learn (and he'll be instantly dismissed if he tells at the post office he doesn't know how to ride the bicycle). Jaimito also is rather very lazy and tends to avoid carrying out tasks with the excuse of "avoiding fatigue" (in the English dub of the animated series, his excuse is that "his tiredness makes him tired"). He hails from Tangamandapio, Michoacán, which, although being a real location in Mexico, is thought by fans of being just a coincidental joke (Jaimito once said that "Tangamandapio is bigger than New York; it's so big, it doesn't appear in any maps"). His full name, Jaime Garabito, is revealed in the 1982 episode "El señor Garabito".

In the English dub of the animated series, and in the official English subtitles for the Netflix print of the original, he is renamed as Manny the Mailman who comes from Upsidedowntown and is voiced by Dave Mallow. In Brazil, his name was changed to Jaiminho, o carteiro and his hometown Tangamandápio.

=== Doña Nieves ===
- Portrayed by María Antonieta de las Nieves
- 1977: Guest, 1979-1980, 1980-1985, 1990

Chilindrina's great-grandmother, and Don Ramón's grandmother (the one constantly referred to by Doña Florinda after slapping Don Ramón in the face). She has many character traits of both Don Ramón and Chilindrina. In some late "Chavo" episodes and early "Chespirito" episodes, she also takes over for her grandson Don Ramón. María Antonieta de las Nieves had been playing a nameless character similar to Doña Nieves for years in a variety of sketches, but she did not work particularly well in the Don Ramón role; for one thing, it was awkward that Doña Nieves and Chilindrina could not appear in very much scenes together, due to both being portrayed by the same actress, except via special effects. By the late 1980s, her character had virtually disappeared from "El Chavo". In Brazil, her name was changed to Dona Neves. She has also appeared in various Dr. Chapatín sketches.

== Minor characters ==
- Doña Eduviges, or in English as Mrs. Esnett (played by Janet Arceo), only in 1973: For two episodes she lives in the upstairs apartment of the vecindad and interacts with the other characters. Except for dressing differently and living in a different apartment, she acts exactly the same as Doña Clotilde, right down to her heavy-handed flirting with Don Ramón. But obviously she was very crazy, because one time she said that she dyed her hair white just because it was fashionable. The kids even call her "La Loca de la Escalera" ("The crazy lady from upstairs"). In the very next episode, Doña Clotilde is back and Doña Eduviges is never seen or mentioned again. Jaimito is assumed to have moved into her apartment or the one next to it, since he usually came from the same direction.
- Paty and Gloria, in 1972, 1975 and 1978: Paty (who is Chavo's age) and her aunt Gloria (who is Don Ramón's love interest, much for jealousy, disgust and irritation of Doña Clotilde) move into the upstairs apartment. They are considered to be very beautiful and the men and boys of the vecindad immediately fall in love with them, while the women and girls get quite jealous of them. The 1978 version of Paty (played by Ana Lilian de la Macorra) became a regular character, appearing in many episodes of the half-hour version's last season. In the English dub of the animated series, Paty and Gloria's names were not changed (except Paty was given another t in her name). Both Paty and Gloria have different actresses, Paty was voiced by Tara Platt while Gloria was voiced by Dakota Fanning.

Both characters were played by more than one actress: Gloria was played by Maribel Fernández in 1972, Olivia Leyva in 1975 and Regina Torné in 1978; Paty was played in by Patty Juárez 1972, Rosita Bouchot in 1975, Ana Lilian de la Macorra in 1978, and Patty Strevel in 1987.

- Malicha, or in English as Molly (played by María Luisa Alcalá), only in 1974: Don Ramón's god-daughter and Chilindrina's cousin. During María Antonieta de las Nieves' absence in the series, Malicha briefly substituted her. Much like Doña Eduviges, she disappeared after a small number of episodes and was never seen or mentioned again.
- Don Román, or in English as Randall Raymond (played by Germán Robles), only in 1975: He takes Don Ramón's place in an episode of the 1975 season; he is said to be Don Ramón's cousin and Chilindrina's uncle. In Brazil, his name was changed to Seu Madroga, being analogous to Don Ramón/Seu Madruga.
- Señor Hurtado (played by José Antonio Mena and Ricardo de Pascual), in 1974 and 1976: A sneaky and suspicious man (actually a thief) who lives somewhere in the vecindad in a single episode conveniently named "El Ladrón de La Vecindad". His felonies are charged to Chavo by mistake (which results in everyone in the vecindad accusing El Chavo of theft, causing him to temporarily leave the vecindad in a nocturnal scene full of sorrow, thus making this one of the saddest scenes of the series), but he ultimately returns the stolen objects, restoring Chavo's innocence towards his neighbors; however, Señor Hurtado never does claim the robberies himself. His name is reference to the Spanish word "hurtado", implying he's, in fact, a thief ("hurtar" is Spanish for "to steal"). In the English dub of the animated series, he is known as "Mr. Crookley".

In Brazil, his name was translated into Senhor Furtado, fitting to his surname ("furtar" is Portuguese for "to steal") very similarly to the original Spanish language and also being an actual surname in the country.

- Señor Calvillo, or in English as Mr. Badillo (only in 1976): This bald character only appears in a two-part episode called "La Vecindad en Venta". In this episode, Señor Barriga discovers that he has heart problems and must move to a location with a lower altitude. Senõr Calvillo thus offers to buy the vecindad, or neighborhood, from him. Everybody is against it due to the fact that they fear a negative result will come of it. Strangely, Señor Calvillo develops a crush on Doña Clotilde. Fortunately for everyone, Señor Barriga's diagnosis turned to be incorrect, and he proceeds to save the neighborhood without selling to Señor Calvillo (who wanted to demolish the vecindad and build a luxurious business building instead, forcing the occupants to have to go to find someplace else to live in). This character is also known for having nicknames given to him by the neighborhood children: "Sr. Carequinha", "Seu Carequinha", "Cuca Lisinha" and "Cabeça Pelada" (in Portuguese). This character is portrayed by Ricardo de Pascual, the same actor who also plays Señor Hurtado.

In another version of the character, the same situation occurs with the new character being named Señor Barbadillo (played by Horacio Gómez Bolaños in 1982, who also played Godínez, and Ramiro Orci in 1986).

- Héctor Bonilla (only in 1979, played by himself): This same famous Mexican actor and director only appears in a two-part episode called "El actor Héctor Bonilla". In the same plot, Héctor's car has a flat tire near the neighborhood, and Héctor goes there looking for help. As the episode progresses, Héctor is harassed by Doña Florinda, Chilindrina and Doña Clotilde who consider him an idol. Don Ramón also takes advantage of the actor and charges as much as he can to fix his car. In the end, Héctor has his car fixed and leaves, but then returns one last time to the neighborhood to give a soccer ball as a gift to Chavo, as he had promised throughout the episode. In another version of the character, the same situation occurs with the new character being named Rogelio Guerra (played by this same other Mexican actor).

== Animated series only ==
- Justiciero Enmascarado (Portuguese: Justiceiro Mascarado; English: Secret Masked Crusader, or simply as Masked Crusader) is El Chavo's favorite wrestler and one of the favorite heroes, like El Chapulín Colorado ("Captain Hopper") in the television, he fights enemies like vampires, zombies and wolfmen. his enemy is Furioso Desesperado ("Desperate Furious").
- Rubia Margot (Portuguese: Loira Margô; English: Margot Haddock, or simply as Blonde Margot) is an actress of some movies and TV shows that Don Ramón falls in love, in the debut, Don Ramón is knocked out that makes a hallucination to Doña Clotilde as the actress, despiste she strongly hates her. El Chavo and the gang believed that Don Ramón is charmed by the witch's spells.
- Rufino Malacara (Portuguese: Rufino Mau-da-cara; English: Rufino Meanface) was played as the main antagonist in two episodes of season four of El Chavo animado, is original based on Señor Calvillo and Señor Barbadillo, he make a lie to Señor Barriga to be a new owner of the vecindad, he asked Chavo and the gand to find the treasure in the ground of the vecindad after Chavo told him that there was a treasure (which turned to be Quico) that later can't cave more holes anymore, just accidentally Chavo breaks a pipe, when everyone in the neighborhood are confronting Rufino Malacara when Señor Barriga went away and is back when he found a true of the lie about the bank check is fake, Rufino Malacara is finally arrested by to buy the neighborhood without permission and for the destruction, and arrested by to stole keys in the car station, he's scaped but gets hit by El Chavo, and he ends up filling the holes he forced the children to make as his punishment.
- Fito Fuerte (in Portuguese as Fábio Furgão, or simply as Hércules; in English as Ferdinand Strong) is the stronger action man from the episode "Out of the Blue" (original as "Caido del Cielo"), when El Chavo and his friends are punished by messing up the vecindad with mudcakes war and the adult make fault to Señor Barriga, so he makes favors to the kids to clean the neighborhood, Chavo sweeps the floor to make a dust nob to make scare the bird appearing an eagle to eat and accidentally break Fito Fuerte's globe, making him fall to the vecindad. Arriving there, he help the kids how to clean the vecindad funny. He also makes other role appearances, like in "Viaje en el metro", featuring Justiciero Enmascarado to stop the subway train; and also in the episode "Vuela Chavo", when he rescues Chavo from the nest of eagles that they want to eat him.
- Panfilo (in Portuguese as Pâfilo; in English as Percy) Originally, in the English version of "Un bebé en la vecindad" has no translation name, but is referred to as "The Baby", is a cute baby from the episode "Baby Talk" (original as "Un bebe en la vecindad") is found by Chavo and Quico outside of the neighborhood in the basket with a note saying: "Mr. Irresponsible!, why did you forget your son? Take him with you!", so they believe that the irresponsible dad left it, Chavo, Ñoño and Quico baby sit him when Doña Florinda and Doña Clotilde are looking for the real irresponsible dad, but mistakenly accuse Profesor Jirafales and then Don Ramón, when the baby escapes to the city, the neighborhood crow gets found out, so Chavo comes to rescue, when Don Ramón still finding until the traffic light when it's red, all cars ran over Raimond to fly away without injuries, later the parents worried that the baby is gone but finally looking at Chavo babysitting the baby and they are happy it's been found, but Doña Florinda and Doña Clotilde both slap the dad in the face for his irresponsibility, the parents carrying the baby to go back home and El Chavo says goodbye and I'll miss you, but then the mother ask Chavo if he wants to babysit Panfilo's brothers and he agrees to babysit Panfilo again with his brothers. He, his brothers and the parents are making cameos in other episodes until in the episode "Subway Travel" (original as "Viaje en el metro"), making another major role, when they ask Chavo to babysit Panfilo and the brothers again. But suddenly, all babies are in the subway so Chavo and his friends are going to rescue but the subway gets out of the control, until at the end the babies are really fine and Chavo returns the babies to the parents and they are pleased by caring the babies. In the end, when El Chavo and Don Ramón prefer to go in bus and gets shocked and scared to see the babies again when the episode ends.
- Rosita (in Portuguese as Rosinha; in English as Rosie): A girl who only appears in the episode "Friendship Vale" (original as "El valor de la amistad"). She helps El Chavo and his friends discover the value of friendship. And then she was never seen again, but she was mentioned by Chavo in two episodes of that same animated series.
- Doctor Chapatín: based on the same character from El Chapulín Colorado and other Chespirito sketches, he is an old doctor with a very grumpy personality, with red scarf and with full bag that serves to hit someone by insulting him that he's old, in the animated series he made a cameo appearance in one of Manny's photos in the album, mentioned that was one of the friends. Later, in the episode "Quico se manchó" ("Quico spilled") from season 7, he make his first major role trying to cure Quico with measles, played by Jesús Gúzman.
