= ¡Ah qué Kiko! =

- Genre: Sitcom; Comedy
- Created by: Carlos Villagrán
- Starring: Carlos Villagrán; Ramón Valdés; Sergio "El Comanche" Ramos; Jorge Alejandro; Beatriz Olea; Dacia Arcaraz; Tito Dreinhüffer
- Country of origin: Mexico
- Original language: Spanish
- No. of seasons: 1
- No. of episodes: 29

Production
- Running time: 23 minutes
- Production company: Telerey

Original release
- Network: Imevisión
- Release: January 1, 1987 – February 1, 1988

Related
- El Chavo del Ocho

¡Ah qué Kiko! (Oh, that Kiko, lit. What a boy, it's Kiko!) is a Mexican sitcom produced by Telerey for the Imevisión network (now TV Azteca). It stars Carlos Villagrán portraying Kiko, a modified version of his character of Quico from El Chavo del Ocho and Ramón Valdés as Don Ramón. This is Valdés's final TV work before his death from cancer in August 1988, six months after the show's last episode.

== Synopsis ==
The series takes place in a small town where Don Ramón is the manager of a small grocery store called ‘La Sorpresa’ (The Surprise). Kiko is a frequent client who later starts working for him.

== Cast ==
- Carlos Villagrán as Kiko
- Ramón Valdés as Don Ramón
- Sergio "El Comanche" Ramos as Don Cejudo
- Beatriz Olea as Pamela
- Jorge Alejandro as Toto
- Dacia Arcaraz as Nena
- Tito Dreinhüffer as Fito
