= Carlos Villagrán =

Mexican actor, comedian and journalist

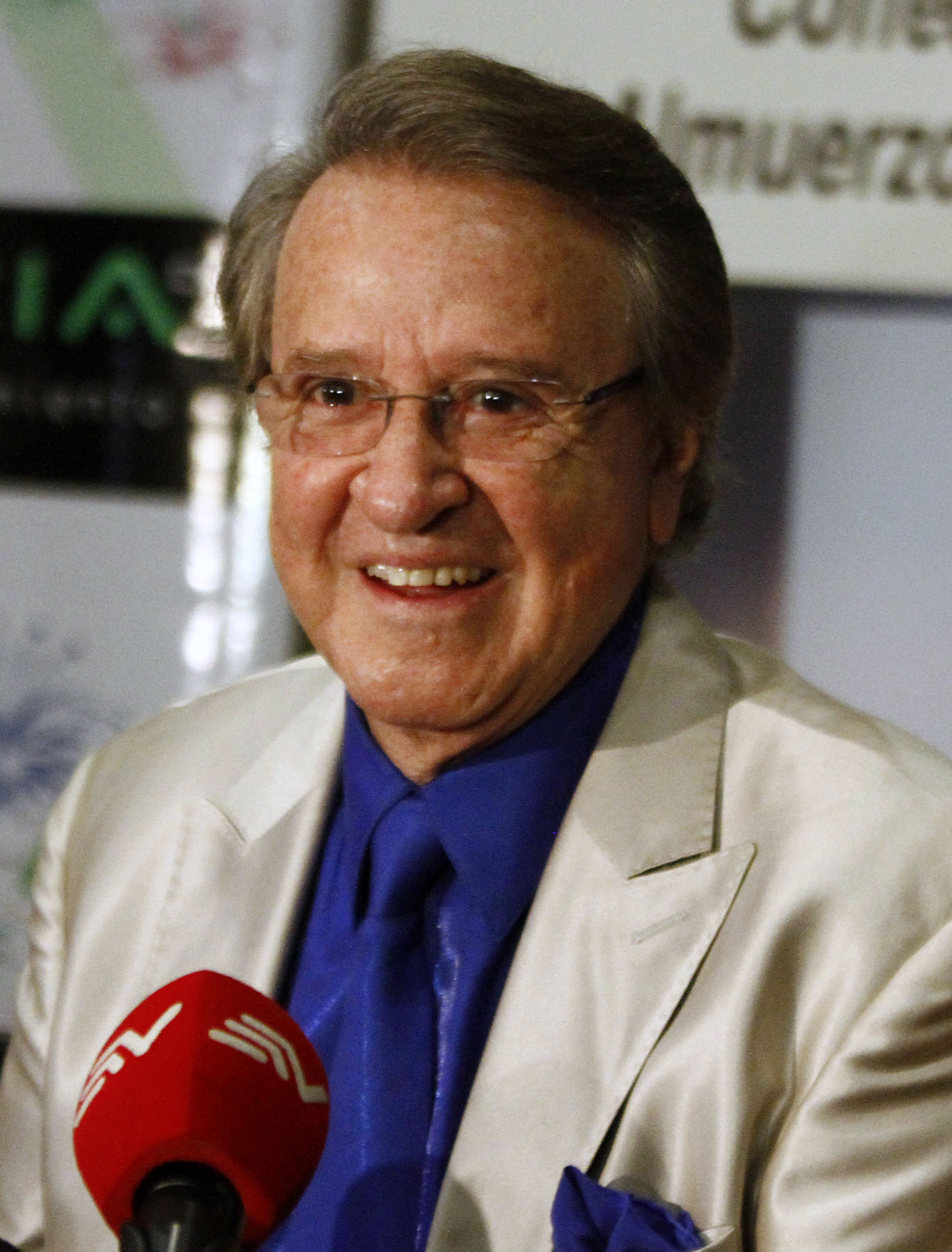
- Villagrán in 2015
- Born: Carlos Villagrán Eslava; 12 January 1944 (age 82); Mexico City, Mexico
- Other name: "Kiko"
- Occupations: Actor, comedian, former journalist
- Years active: 1964–present
- Notable work: Quico in El Chavo del Ocho
- Children: 6

Carlos Villagrán Eslava (born 12 January 1944) is a Mexican actor, comedian, and former journalist best known for playing Kiko in the Televisa sitcom El Chavo del Ocho.

== Life and career ==
=== Early life ===
Villagrán started off as a photographer for the Mexico City newspaper El Heraldo, with this position leading him to become friends with screenwriter and future co-star Rubén Aguirre. Aguirre had been hired by Chespirito (Roberto Gómez Bolaños) to play the role of Professor Jirafales in the then upcoming El Chavo del Ocho television series for Televisa. Aguirre held a party for family and friends at his house to celebrate, and Villagrán impressed him after expanding his cheeks out of proportion during one of the party's comic steps. As a matter of a fact, that movement would later become a trademark of the character he'd play in El Chavo.

=== El Chavo ===
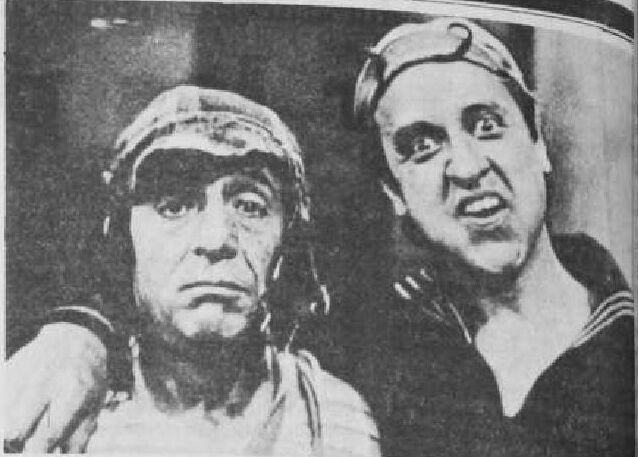
Villagrán dressed as Quico with Roberto Gómez Bolaños characterized as El Chavo

Aguirre recommended Villagrán to Chespirito, and - impressed by the photographer - Villagrán was given the role of Quico, Chavo's rival, in the show. He also appeared on Chespirito's other hit show, El Chapulín Colorado. Both of Chespirito's shows became major international hits all over Iberoamerica, Spain, the United States and other countries, catapulting Villagrán into popularity.

Villagrán left the shows in 1978, for reasons never officially confirmed; speculation suggests it was because he and Chespirito were engaged in a legal battle over the rights of the Quico character. At that same time, Ramón Valdés also left the two shows. This marked the beginning of the end of active creating for both productions, although re-runs of the program continue to this day.

=== After El Chavo ===
Villagrán went to Venezuela, where he acted in various Radio Caracas Televisión shows: El niño de papel (1981), Federrico (1982), Las nuevas aventuras de Federrico (1983), El circo de monsieur Cachetón (1985) and Kiko Botones (1986). These were not successful as Chespirito's productions had been in Mexico. He and Valdés were reunited in Mexico when production company Telerey hired them to make the short-lived television show ¡Ah qué Kiko! for Imevisión. Chespirito was not able to prevent the name Kiko, with its different spelling, from being used in the new show. The show was successful for its first year until Valdés died of stomach cancer in 1988. For a brief time a local comic named Sergio Ramos was brought in as Don Cejudo to replace Valdés, but the show soon was taken off the air due to the difference in chemistry between the characters causing a decline in popularity.

Like many of his co-stars in the Chespirito shows, Villagrán went on to enjoy a circus career, touring with his El circo de Kiko.

Villagrán later did what his friend Aguirre had done before, moving to Argentina, where Chespirito had no rights over the character, and continued to play the role of his old character there.

=== 2000s and beyond ===
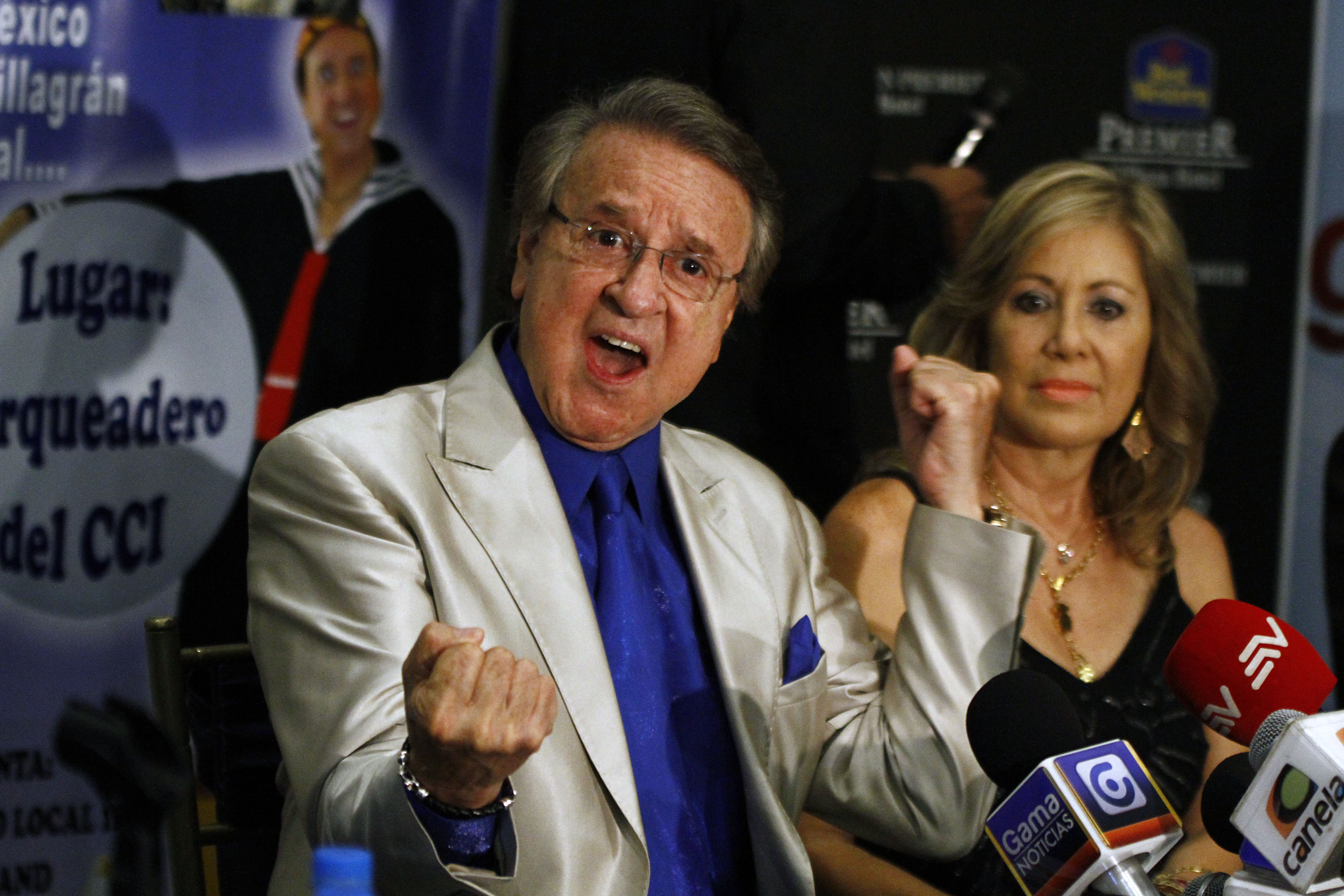
Villagrán in 2015

On 1 April 2000, in an El Chavo del Ocho special which reunited all the actors from the series to honor the career of Chespirito (except Ramón Valdés, Angelines Fernández, Raúl Padilla, Horacio Gómez Bolaños, who had all passed prior to the special, and Ana Lilian de la Macorra, who was unable to attend), Villagrán and Chespirito saw each other for the first time in twenty-two years and reconciled their differences. However, communication between the two declined over time and it was believed that this supposed reconciliation was basically a publicity stunt.

Villagrán made an appearance in 2004 on the Venezuelan game show La guerra de los sexos, portraying the role of Kiko in various games and helping the men's team to victory. He would return to the program again a year later, this time in a loss to the women's team.

Villagrán expressed regrets in a Facebook post upon Chespirito's death in 2014; despite rumors spreading that the actor was banned from the event, Villagrán would later attend Chespirito's wake to reconcile with the latter's family.

In 2017, Villagrán starred in the Brazilian film adaptation of TV presenter Danilo Gentili's Como se Tornar o Pior Aluno da Escola in the role of Ademar, the director of the school and antagonist of the film.

Villagrán returned to the role of Quico in late 2023 for a public service announcement produced by the United States Embassy in Mexico against illegal immigration. The campaign was criticized in social media by individual citizens.

== Personal life ==
Villagrán has been married three times. He has four sons and three daughters. In 2022, Villagrán confirmed that one of his daughters had overcome breast cancer.

In a 2013 interview with the Brazilian newspaper O Globo, Villagrán proved to be insightful on his aging and his role, suggesting that he had been considering retirement:

"I am 69 years old. Out of respect for the fans, I will stop competing with my worst enemy: the younger Kiko who appears on television every day. I can't fight with him, as he doesn't age and doesn't like me! But the fans won't be orphaned, the series will continue for those who want to watch. I will miss the audience and the laughter, it's very beautiful!"

On November 17, 2023, Univision journalist Inés Moreno revealed that the actor would be going under treatment for prostate cancer. In 2025 he announced that his cancer was now in remission.

== In popular culture ==
In 2025, Villagrán was portrayed in the series Chespirito: Not Really on Purpose by Juan Lecanda under the pseudonym Marcos Barragán. He did not give his consent for his name to be used in the series, and he asked producer Roberto Gómez Fernández to change it, so a fictional name and character based on him were chosen.
