= Ana Lilian de la Macorra =

Mexican actress

- Born: Ana Lilian de la Macorra Apéllaniz; 27 November 1957 (age 68); Mexico City, Mexico

Academic background
- Education: Towson University

Ana Lilian de la Macorra Apéllaniz (born 27 November 1957) is a Mexican psychologist, who worked as a producer and actress in the well-known Mexican sitcoms, El Chavo del Ocho and El Chapulín Colorado in the late 1970s until obtaining the permanent role of Paty in 1978 in El Chavo.

== Early life and career in Televisa ==
De la Macorra was born on November 27, 1957, in Mexico City, DF. Since she was a child, she was fond of animals, books, and music.

During de la Macorra's teens, she worked as a nurse, receptionist, and secretary.

De la Macorra began working as a production assistant at Televisa after she lost her job while studying at university, and later became editor of the sitcoms El Chavo del Ocho and El Chapulín Colorado. In 1978, Chespirito wrote three episodes with two extra characters, which were Aunt Gloria and her niece Paty. Many actresses came, and Ana Lilian was in charge of casting them. But since none of them managed to look like a little girl, Chespirito offered her the role of Paty, given her beauty and girlish face, in addition to her resemblance to the actress Regina Torné, who played the role of Aunt Gloria.

Thus, de la Macorra became the third actress in playing the role of Paty and appeared in the three episodes of El Chavo del Ocho "The New Neighbours" in 1978. Due to her success, her appearances were extended to a total of twelve episodes between 1978 and 1979, which made her the most remembered Paty by fans. These appearances were mainly at school, although she was also seen in the neighbourhood and at Doña Florinda's restaurant.

In addition, de la Macorra participated in two songs in El Chavo del Ocho: the song "That, that, that" in the 1979 episode "Valentine's Day Part 1" and "Cri Crí", which appears at the end of the episode "Children's Day ”, also from 1979.

De la Macorra made her last appearance in late 1979 in the episode "Dreaming at the Restaurant," since she was not and did not want to be an actress. She decided to withdraw from the cameras and continue working in the production area until 1980, in order to study psychology in the United States and due to the birth of her first child in 1981.

De la Macorra describes being friends with Luis Felipe Macias since she was the one who offered her the job of production assistant at Televisa, and with Paco Peña, who described being a close friend. She says that the atmosphere within the program was very “neat and respectful.” She was also a friend of Edgar Vivar, and they met again more than thirty-five years later in 2015 thanks to a Brazilian program.

== Later life ==
Little was known about de la Macorra's whereabouts after the show until December 2012, when a Peruvian television program found her in Mexico City. She currently lives with her partner, has two children, and works as a psychologist in Mexico City. She also writes for different magazines and newspapers on psychological issues.

De la Macorra worked as a Spanish teacher, painter, upholsterer of house walls, and bought some land that she turned into a ranch in Colonia Chimalpa in Mexico.

After working at Televisa, de la Macorra moved to Cleveland and sold British encyclopedias door-to-door while in college. She studied psychology and did her master's in psychotherapy in Baltimore. After graduation, she worked in state psychological care clinics in the United States. After that, she decided to return to Mexico and stay to work until today in Mexico City in her personal office.

After reappearing before the cameras in 2012, de la Macorra gave several interviews to different Latin media and was invited to several countries on several occasions, including Brazil.

In 2014, de la Macorra published Hondos los suspiros.
