= María Antonieta de las Nieves =

Mexican actress, comedian, singer and author

Maria Antonieta de las Nieves
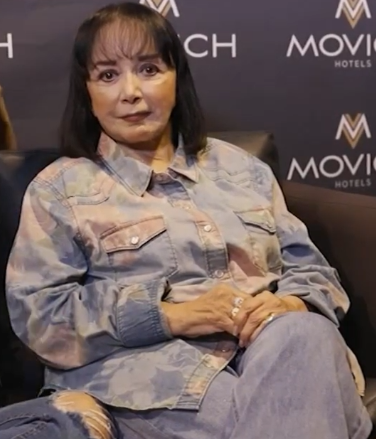
- De las Nieves in 2024
- Born: María Antonieta Gómez Rodríguez; 4 December 1949 (age 76) (Note: De las Nieves' date of birth varies according to source. Whilst de las Nieves herself states in her autobiography that she was born on 4 December 1949, other sources, such as the case of Infobae place her date of birth as 22 December 1946.); Mexico City, Mexico
- Occupations: Actress; comedian; singer
- Years active: 1957–present
- Spouse: Gabriel Fernández (m. 1971; died 2019)
- Children: 2
- Website: lachilindrina.com

María Antonieta Gómez Rodríguez (born 4 December 1949), more commonly known by her stage name María Antonieta de las Nieves, is a Mexican actress, comedian, singer, and author. Her best remembered role is that of La Chilindrina, one of the main characters of the Televisa sitcom El Chavo del Ocho.

== Early life ==
De las Nieves was born in Mexico City, daughter of parents who had emigrated to the city from Santiago Ixcuintla, Nayarit. She is the youngest of the seven children of Estanislao Gómez Ocampo and Delfilia Rodríguez Ocampo, who owned a women's clothing store.

De las Nieves lost one of her brothers, José Luis, in the 1985 Mexico City earthquake, when his house collapsed. His wife and daughter survived.

== Career ==
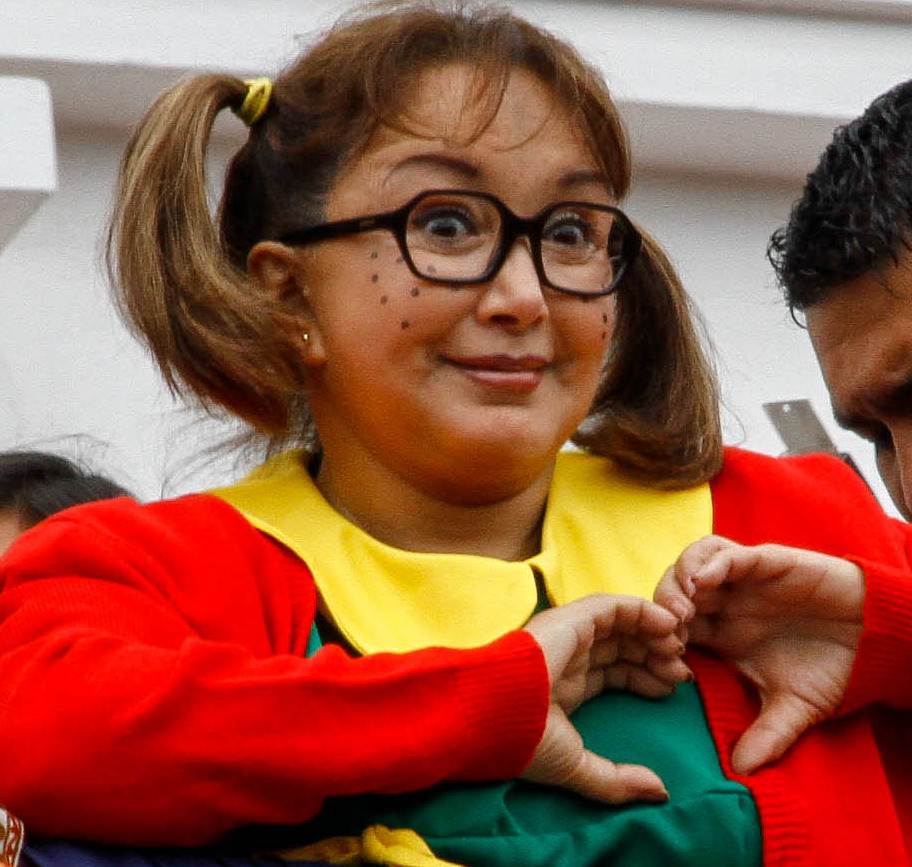
De las Nieves dressed as La Chilindrina in December 2014

She made her film debut in the fantasy film Pulgarcito (1957), starring María Elena Marqués, José Elías Moreno, and Cesáreo Quezadas in the title role. At age 10, she became a voice actress; she provided the Spanish voices for characters such as Wednesday Addams from The Addams Family, Eddie Munster from The Munsters, Batgirl from Batman, and Invisible Woman from Fantastic Four. Her first telenovela was Estafa de amor (1961), starring Carmen Montejo and Amparo Rivelles.

De las Nieves became famous as La Chilindrina in the Televisa sitcom El Chavo del Ocho. She was also the lead actress in El Chapulín Colorado until 1973, when she left and Florinda Meza replaced her. She was a voice actress at Televisa, when Chespirito heard her talk. Thinking her voice was perfect for the Chilindrina character, he offered her a job at his new television program, and she accepted. Both El Chavo del Ocho and El Chapulín Colorado became hits across Latin America, in New Zealand and the United States, as well as various other countries where the program was translated into local languages. The casts of Chavo and Chapulín toured extensively whilst the series was on; after cancellation of the series' filming in Mexico, its actors continued travelling, and the series continued to be featured in many Latin American countries (as of 2024, it is still shown in the United States).

In 1994, she was cast as the lead in Aquí está la Chilindrina, in which she lives in a convent with various nuns and orphan girls. Despite only lasting a short run, it had big success. She played Dulce Amado, an elderly aunt, in the Telemundo telenovela Dame Chocolate (2007). In 2012, de las Nieves participated as a contestant in Univision's third season of Mira Quién Baila. She has voiced Vanellope von Schweetz in the Spanish dub of Wreck-It Ralph (2012).

De las Nieves also portrayed La Chilindrina in a character spinoff film titled La Chilindrina en apuros, which was released in Mexico in December 1994.

== Lawsuit ==
María Antonieta de las Nieves was able to win a legal battle over Chespirito in 2003, one that gives her permission to act as La Chilindrina in public whenever she wants to, and grants her rights over the character she played. Chespirito owns the rights to most of the other characters of the shows he created, which led some of the actors like Rubén Aguirre (Professor Jirafales) and Carlos Villagrán (Quico) to move to Argentina at separate points of their careers to revive the characters. In addition, because of the lawsuit, La Chilindrina is the only major character in the series that doesn't appear in the animated series El Chavo Animado and in its spin-off video game, El Chavo Kart.

== Personal life ==
In November 2021, it was announced that de las Nieves and her character of La Chilindrina would be included in the Guinness World Records for being the actress "portraying the same role for the longest time (1971–2020)."

On 29 December 2021, de las Nieves tested positive for COVID-19. She announced it on social media, adding that she was experiencing mild symptoms.

De las Nieves has said that she suffers from fibromyalgia.
