= Video Kids =

Dutch Euro disco duo

- Origin: Rijnsaterwoude, Netherlands
- Genre: Euro disco
- Years active: 1984–1988
- Labels: Break Records, Replay Records, Cat Music & More
- Past members: Video Kids; Peter Slaghuis; Bianca Bonelli; René Portegies; Session members Cees Bergman; Geertjan Hessing; Anita Crooks; Sylvia Crooks

Video Kids were a Dutch Euro disco duo consisting of Peter Slaghuis (1961–1991, later replaced with René Portegies) and Bianca Bonelli (1964–1994), best known for their single "Woodpeckers from Space". The band's members also had solo careers on their own, such as Peter being a famous DJ and remixer, and Bianca having a solo single called "Je Veux L'amour (Follow Me)". All of their original songs were produced and written by Catapult musicians Aart Mol, Cees Bergman, Elmer Veerhoff, Erwin van Prehn and Geertjan Hessing (under the aliases "Adams & Fleisner" and "Tony Acardi"), and recorded at Cat Music.

The most notable aspect of the band is the fact that they were very popular yet short-lived, only releasing two albums, The Invasion of the Spacepeckers in 1984 and On Satellite in 1985. They also had an animated mascot named Tico Tac, a "spacepecker" who wore a yellow space suit and white space helmet, and had a wood drill on his backside functioning like an insect stinger. He also had the same laugh as Woody Woodpecker as his trademark, and was featured in the band's music videos for "Woodpeckers from Space" and "Do the Rap" along with the real band members, so for that reason they were almost considered a virtual group. In 1985, The Invasion of the Spacepeckers was released at the Midem music festival, and went on to sell 1.1 million copies. The band received the RIAA Gold Record Award and Conamus Export Award for their success with their first album and songs.

The songs "Tico Tac" (from On Satellite) and "Witch Doctor" were the only covers that they did, originally by synth-pop group Polysix (also produced by Cat Music) and Ross Bagdasarian, respectively.

== History ==
=== Beginnings ===
Catapult, a glam rock band formed by and consisting of Aart Mol, Cees Bergman, Erwin van Prehn and Geertjan Hessing and later joined by Elmer Veerhoff, had scored a number of hits in the 1970s; "Let Your Hair Hang Down" and "Teeny Bopper Band" were two of the band's hits. As their popularity began to fade, the band decided that it was time for something different. They wanted to make music in different styles, which was difficult because of their Leiden dialect and Dutch radio stations and television channels' refusal to accept the quintet's ability to do so. With advice from Dutch DJ Willem van Kooten, they started writing and producing songs for other artists, including Lia Velasco, Patricia Paay, Liberation of Man, The Internationals, The Surfers, Rita Hovink, and Snoopy. In 1977, they formed Cat Music in Hazerswoude-Rijndijk, where they formed Rubberen Robbie and recorded as The Monotones, scoring a hit in Germany and the Netherlands with the song "Mono".

In the 1980s, the members formed a new studio in Rijnsaterwoude, where they wrote songs for Tower and André Hazes, and started writing and producing breakdance, hip hop and Italo disco music. They entered a compact disc store owned by Gert van den Bosch, where they listened to illegal records of Italian dance projects and Hi-NRG artists. Inspired by this, they took the records to their studio and used electronic instruments to make "legal" sound-alikes of them. The members used pseudonyms such as "Adams & Fleisner" and "Tony Acardi", and formed various fictional bands and artists where the members were models and dancers hired for cover photograph shoots and lip-synced to songs sung by Bergman, Hessing and session performers. These included Fantastique, Gazuzu, Polysix, Digital Emotion, Master Genius, X-Ray Connection, Dr. Groove, Blanc De Blanc, Joanne Daniëls, Comfort & Joy, Party Freaks, and Twiggy Bop. Many of their dance and Italo disco records were released by Dutch labels such as Dureco Benelux and Boni Records (through their sublabel Break Records), founded by and named after Van den Bosch and Jan van Nieuwkoop in 1982.

=== Music career ===
In 1983, Cat Music wrote and produced "Let's Break" by Master Genius, a medley of songs done in an 80's megamix style. One of the many sounds included in the song (and its 1984 follow-up "Let's Break Into the 80's") was the laugh of Woody Woodpecker, provided by Hessing. Van den Bosch's children, who were big fans of Woody and always wanted to hear him on the record, asked their father if he could produce a record based on the character. Upon learning this, Cat Music decided to write, produce and record a song about Woody, named "Woodpeckers from Space", a 5-minute synth-pop cover of "The Woody Woodpecker Song" by George Tibbles and Ramey Idriss. The song's name was also inspired by "Invaders from Space" by Dynamic Seven. The main vocals were performed by Bergman, with Hessing singing as Woody. The female vocals and two of Woody's laughs were done by Anita and Sylvia Crooks of The Internationals.

Inspired by the popularity of the VCR and the earliest video game consoles, Cat Music gave their new studio project the name "Video Kids". In order to avoid being sued by Universal Studios, a new character named Tico Tac, a "spacepecker", was created as the group's mascot and used on the single's front cover. Tico was named after the song of the same name by Polysix, and designed by Boni Records cover designer Dirk Arend (going under the pseudonym "Fruut" at the time). Several other companies, including Polydor Records, showed interest in the song, but did not like Arend's early design for Tico, so the character was redesigned by Bjørn Frank Jensen and coloured by Frits Godhelp at Toonder Studio's. Jensen also drew a promotional comic strip named Tico Tac: Spacepecker, in which Tico meets a man who invites him into his house. Upon entry, he starts poking holes everywhere. The man decides to tame Tico by taping his mouth shut and tying his drill to a plunger. The single was released on 4 September 1984, peaking in 14th place in the Dutch Top 40 on 6 October 1984 and 17th in Ultratop 50 Flanders between 13 October 1984 and 17 November 1984.

Cat Music decided to record and produce some more tracks in full, and compile them in their project's debut album, The Invasion of the Spacepeckers. They hired and asked Peter Slaghuis and Bianca Pikaar to be the faces of the Euro disco act. Slaghuis had done remixes of Cat Music's other projects, such as the Special European Edit of "After The Rainbow" by Joanne Daniëls (along with Emile Noorhoek) and "Steppin' Out" by Digital Emotion, and would later use "Woodpeckers from Space" in the seventh instalment in his "Disco Breaks" bootleg series, while Pikaar, under the stage name "Bianca Bonelli", had toured with the bands Sam and Joan Company and Overkill, and would later have a solo single called "Je Veux L'amour (Follow Me)", also written and produced by Cat Music. A music video for "Woodpeckers from Space" was filmed, in which Tico plays pranks on the Slaghuis/Bonelli flight crew, messing with their spaceship. The video was shot in the Airplane Museum at Amsterdam Airport Schiphol. Peter, Bianca and the flight crew's pilots and scientists (played by Cat Music themselves, except Mol and Hessing) lip-sync to Cees Bergman, Geertjan Hessing and Anita and Sylvia's vocals during the video. The former two's costumes were personally sewn by Peter's mother, Helen Slaghuis. Tico was animated by Bjørn Frank Jensen, Frits Godhelp and Harrie Geelen. The album was released by Break Records in December 1984, and by Polydor in 1985.

By 1985, "Woodpeckers from Space" was an international hit, peaking in 72nd place in the United Kingdom, 6th in Switzerland, 4th in Germany, 2nd in Portugal, and 1st in Norway and Spain. Boni Records promoted The Invasion of the Spacepeckers by airing the song's music video on music television channels, and Video Kids began their tour around Europe, doing live shows and concerts. The album was released at the Midem music festival and sold 1.1 million copies, and won the band an RIAA Gold Record Award. "Woodpeckers from Space" and their other songs, such as "Do the Rap" and "La Bamba", were played quite often on radio stations at the time, and covered and included on several best-of albums and compilations. A cover version was made by the South African band Café Society, staying on the South African Top 20 for 22 weeks from June to November, of which 7 were held at the No. 1 position from August to October.

During their popularity, the band released "Do the Rap" as a single, which only peaked in 9th place in the Dutch Top 40 on 18 May 1985. The single also included "Happy Birthday" (from "Cartooney Tunes") and "Skyrider", and featured Tico Tac: Spacepecker on its back cover. A music video for "Do the Rap" was filmed, where Slaghuis, Bonelli and Tico are at a party, dancing and singing along to a record player playing the song. Video Kids also released their second album, On Satellite, in which the music sounded somewhat different with the addition of some bass guitar. The first song of the album, "Satellite", would later be released individually as the band's third single and initially receive positive feedback worldwide, with its music video reusing footage from "Do the Rap's" music video. Slaghuis left the band to continue remixing, and was replaced by René Portegies. Video Kids won the Conamus Export Award for their international success with The Invasion of the Spacepeckers, "Woodpeckers from Space" and "Do the Rap". In 1986, Boni Records promoted On Satellite for release at the Midem music festival. Unlike The Invasion of the Spacepeckers, this album was unsuccessful, as were the band's other singles, "Do the Rap" and "Satellite". Boni Records would later release a 12" remix of "Woodpeckers from Space" by S. Mortali that year.

In 1988, Cat Music recorded Video Kids' fourth and last single, "Witch Doctor" (also known as "Witch Doctor/Tico Strikes Again"), a cover of the song of the same name by Ross Bagdasarian, which also included "Tico's Day Off". The single was released by themselves as "Replay Records" due to Boni Records' closure the previous year, and failed to hit the charts. In 1989, a house remix of "Woodpeckers from Space" was produced by Lex van Coeverden. This remix was not released as a single, only appearing on compilation albums instead.

In 1994, ZXY Music released a Eurodance remix of "Woodpeckers from Space" by Patrick de Schrevel, which also included the 1986 and 1989 mixes. In 1999, "Woodpeckers from Space" was included in the compilation album Cat Nuggets, released by Red Bullet. In 2004, Cat Music licensed "Woodpeckers from Space", "Do the Rap", "Satellite" and "Witch Doctor" to Weton-Wesgram for inclusion in their compilation album Club Hits of the 80's. In 2008, they released the 1986 remix of "Woodpeckers from Space" as part of their album Cartoon Hits and On Satellite on iTunes, Spotify and Apple Music, followed by The Invasion of the Spacepeckers in 2012 and 2013. They would also release Club Hits of the 80's themselves on Apple Music that year. On 22 April 2014, The Invasion of the Spacepeckers was released by MiruMir Music Publishing in Russia. The reissued album included the original "Happy Birthday" calendar and Tico Tac: Spacepecker, and expanded artwork recreated from the original art by Daniel Maslovsky. Maslovsky was also the producer of the album. He did an interview with Mol, later published on Zvuki as part of a promotional campaign for the album's release. It also included a comic strip named Tico Tac: The Woodpecker from Space. The comic begins with Tico's ship crash landing into a dogface's garden. The dogface puts the unconscious spacepecker in a doghouse, but his dog Yslo (later renamed Jeff) chases Tico at night. The dogface calms Yslo down and tells that he will build a house for the spacepecker in the morning and Yslo's life will be back to normal. He then goes back to bed, only to find Tico sleeping in his bed. The album was reissued again in 2024 on Maslovsky's new label Maschina Records in Estonia, on 2CD with rare tracks and unreleased mixes on 29 January 2024, and on different coloured LP records on Bandcamp on 2 February 2024 and in March. In October 2023, "Woodpeckers from Space" was released as part of the compilation album Adams & Fleisner: The Ultimate Collection by i Venti d'Azzurro Records.

=== Personal lives ===
Slaghuis died in a car accident on 5 September 1991, and Bonelli (born 2 January 1964) died a few years later in 1994–1995. According to Video Kids' first concert director, Bonelli was a heavy smoker at the time, indicating that she died of lung cancer.

== Legacy ==
"Woodpeckers from Space" has been covered and remixed several times by other artists throughout history, such as Café Society in 1985; Doctor Pecker and Aleksandr Kalyanov (as "Karabas-Barabas") in 1986, The Smurfs in 1995, V-Kid in 1999, Evelyn in 2001, Spritneybears in 2003, Cirez D in 2004, and Kidz Hitz Party 2: Back To School in 2007. It was also featured in the Pingu episode, "Pingu Helps with Incubating", although it has been replaced by the Flemish Dutch cover of David Hasselhoff's "Pingu-Dance" by Chris Van Tongelen in its newer version.

== Discography ==
=== Albums ===
- The Invasion of the Spacepeckers (1984)
- On Satellite (1985)

=== Singles ===
- "Woodpeckers from Space" (1984)
- "Do the Rap" (1985)
- "Satellite" (1985)
- "Witch Doctor" (1988)
