= Fantastique (pop duo) =

Dutch pop music duo

- Origin: Rijnsaterwoude, Netherlands
- Genres: Synth-pop, disco, electronic
- Years active: 1981-1983
- Labels: CNR Records
- Past members: Fantastique; Dick Van Dam; Astrid Leuwener; Session members Marian Pijnaker; Cor van der Hoogt

Fantastique (from French: fantasy) was a pop music duo from the Netherlands in 1981-1983, consisting of Dick van Dam and Astrid Leuwener. Their singles at the time, "Mama Told Me", "Costa Blanca", "Maria No Mas", "Your Hand In My Hand" and "Everybody Loves The Sunshine", sold successfully worldwide. They released one album, Fantastique in 1982. All of their songs were produced and written by Catapult musicians Aart Mol, Cees Bergman, Elmer Veerhoff, Erwin van Prehn and Geertjan Hessing, and recorded at Cat Music.

== History ==
=== Beginnings ===
Catapult, a glam rock band formed by and consisting of Aart Mol, Cees Bergman, Erwin van Prehn and Geertjan Hessing and later joined by Elmer Veerhoff, had scored a number of hits in the 1970s; "Let Your Hair Hang Down" and "Teeny Bopper Band" were two of the band's hits. As their popularity began to fade, the band decided that it was time for something different. They wanted to make music in different styles, which was difficult because of their Leiden dialect and Dutch radio stations and television channels' refusal to accept the quintet's ability to do so. With advice from Dutch DJ Willem van Kooten, they started writing and producing songs for other artists, including Lia Velasco, Patricia Paay, Liberation of Man, The Internationals, The Surfers, Rita Hovink, and Snoopy. In 1977, they formed Cat Music in Hazerswoude-Rijndijk, where they formed Rubberen Robbie and recorded as The Monotones, scoring a hit in Germany and the Netherlands with the song "Mono".

In the 1980s, the members formed a new studio in Rijnsaterwoude, where they wrote songs for Tower and André Hazes, and started writing and producing breakdance, hip hop and Italo disco music. They entered a compact disc store owned by Gert van den Bosch, where they listened to illegal records of Italian dance projects and Hi-NRG artists such as Bobby Orlando, Giorgio Moroder and Divine. Inspired by this, they took the records to their studio and used electronic instruments to make "legal" sound-alikes of them. The members used pseudonyms such as "Adams & Fleisner" and "Tony Acardi", and formed various fictional bands and artists where the members were models and dancers hired for cover photograph shoots and lip-synced to songs sung by Bergman, Hessing and session performers. These included Gazuzu, Polysix, Digital Emotion, Master Genius, X-Ray Connection, Dr. Groove, Blanc De Blanc, Video Kids, Joanne Daniëls, Comfort & Joy, Party Freaks, and Twiggy Bop. Many of their dance and Italo disco records were released by Dutch labels such as Dureco Benelux and Boni Records (through their sublabel Break Records), founded by and named after Van den Bosch and Jan van Nieuwkoop in 1982.

=== Music career ===
In August 1981, Cat Music wrote and produced "Mama Told Me", a 4-minute electronic dance song for their studio project inspired by Ottawan, Fantastique. The song contained a brassy-laden march rhythm, a keyboard riff inspired by Lipps Inc.'s Funkytown, and singalong chants of "Let's do it, let's do it." The vocals were performed by session singers Marian Pijnaker and Cor van der Hoogt, with Van der Hoogt's vocals sung through a vocoder. After the song was produced, Cat Music hired Dick Van Dam and Astrid Leuwener to be the faces of the project. Van Dam and Leuwener were from the city of Haarlem in the west of the Netherlands. They were deliberately chosen to fit the stereotype of the Dutch everyman, Van Dam with the mane of fair hair and Noel Edmonds beard, Lewener statuesque and permed. Neither could necessarily sing, so they lip-synced to Pijnaker and Van der Hoogt's vocals during live performances. In September 1981, "Mama Told Me" was released as Fantastique's debut single, and became the duo's defining moment. With its brassy-laden march rhythm, vocodered vocals by Van der Hoogt, keyboard riff, and singalong chants, it topped the charts in many countries in the early 1980s. In October 1981, it peaked in 27th place on the Dutch Top 40. In 1982, the duo released their debut album of the same name, Fantastique, which only contained six tracks, and the singles "Costa Blanca", "Maria No Mas", and "Your Hand In My Hand", followed by "Everybody Loves The Sunshine" in 1983. All these songs hit the charts as well. In 1983, the song "Musica Fantastica" was re-released as "Lucky Shot" by Dynamic Seven. In 1985, Cat Music produced a house remix of "Mama Told Me" under their "Adams & Fleisner" pseudonym, which was released by ARS Records, and used a sample from their 1983 cover of "Shame, Shame, Shame" by Shirley & Company as Dynamic Seven. In 1986, "Mama Told Me" spent 13 weeks and reached No. 84 on the UK Singles Chart. Many remixes of the song were issued long after Fantastique drifted into oblivion.

In 1999, "Mama Told Me" and "Costa Blanca" were included in the compilation album Cat Nuggets, released by Red Bullet. In 2004, Cat Music licensed the "Adams & Fleisner" remix of "Mama Told Me" to Weton-Wesgram for inclusion in their compilation album Club Hits of the 80's. They would also release Club Hits of the 80's themselves on Apple Music in 2008. In 2009, High Fashion Music licensed the album Fantastique to Sonic Records for release in Poland as The Best Of..... Fantastique. The album was released on 19 October 2009. In 2012, the album was released in the United States by Classics DJ Club. In 2016, Cat Music released "Mama Told Me", "Costa Blanca", "Maria No Mas", "Your Hand In My Hand" and "Everybody Loves The Sunshine" on Apple Music. In 2023, they licensed Fantastique to Maschina Records for release in Estonia. The reissued album was produced by Daniel Maslovsky, Max Kondrashow and Kirill Taltaev, and included artwork recreated from the original art and restored by them. The album was released on different coloured LP records, and would be released on Bandcamp on 2 February 2024. It was released on 2CD on 3 March 2024. In October 2023, "Mama Told Me" was released as part of the compilation album Adams & Fleisner: The Ultimate Collection.

== Legacy ==
The song "Mama Told Me" was used as part of the soundtrack of the Dutch film I am Joep Meloen (Dutch: Ik Ben Joep Meloen).

"Maria No Mas" and "Everybody Loves The Sunshine" were covered by other artists throughout history, including Meiju Suvas and Merja Ranta as "Tää Onnea On" in 1982, Kolor as "Złota plaża" in 1997, and Queens in their album Made for Dancing in 2006. "Mama Told Me" was sampled in "MYB" by Oliver in 2013.

== Discography ==
=== Albums ===
- Fantastique (1982)

=== Singles ===
- "Mama Told Me" (1981)
- "Costa Blanca" (1982)
- "Maria No Mas" (1982)
- "Your Hand In My Hand" (1982)
- "Everybody Loves The Sunshine" (1983)
