= Digital Emotion =

Dutch Euro disco group

- Origin: Rijnsaterwoude, Netherlands
- Genres: Euro disco, electronic
- Years active: 1983–1991, 2016–present
- Labels: Break Records, Disky, Replay Records, IMC, Dance Device, Cat Music & More, Energy Level
- Past members: Digital Emotion; Steven Koswal; Chickie de Beer; Myrna Balrak; Steve de Goede; Marlinda van der Hoff; Jean François Columbo; Nieke Ruhulessin; Session members Cees Bergman; Geertjan Hessing; Marian Pijnaker; Anita Crooks; Sylvia Crooks; Cindy Crooks; Edward Den Heijer

Digital Emotion is a 1980s Euro disco group from the Netherlands, formed in 1983. The performers in the group were Steven Koswal, Chickie de Beer, Myrna Balrak, Steve de Goede, Marlinda van der Hoff, Jean François Columbo, and Nieke Ruhulessin. Their first singles from 1983, "Get Up, Action" and "Go Go Yellow Screen", sold successfully worldwide. They released two albums, Digital Emotion in 1984 and Outside In The Dark in 1985. All of their songs were produced and written by Catapult musicians Aart Mol, Cees Bergman, Elmer Veerhoff, Erwin van Prehn and Geertjan Hessing (under the aliases "Adams & Fleisner" and "Tony Acardi"), and recorded at Cat Music.

The project is currently produced by Edward Den Heijer, under the pseudonym "Eddy Mi Ami", with Mol and Hessing writing the songs and continuing to use the "Adams & Fleisner" pseudonym.

== History ==
=== Beginnings ===
Catapult, a glam rock band formed by and consisting of Aart Mol, Cees Bergman, Erwin van Prehn and Geertjan Hessing and later joined by Elmer Veerhoff, had scored a number of hits in the 1970s; "Let Your Hair Hang Down" and "Teeny Bopper Band" were two of the band's hits. As their popularity began to fade, the band decided that it was time for something different. They wanted to make music in different styles, which was difficult because of their Leiden dialect and Dutch radio stations and television channels' refusal to accept the quintet's ability to do so. With advice from Dutch DJ Willem van Kooten, they started writing and producing songs for other artists, including Lia Velasco, Patricia Paay, Liberation of Man, The Internationals, The Surfers, Rita Hovink, and Snoopy. In 1977, they formed Cat Music in Hazerswoude-Rijndijk, where they formed Rubberen Robbie and recorded as The Monotones, scoring a hit in Germany and the Netherlands with the song "Mono".

In the 1980s, the members formed a new studio in Rijnsaterwoude, where they wrote songs for Tower and André Hazes, and started writing and producing breakdance, hip hop and Italo disco music. They entered a compact disc store owned by Gert van den Bosch, where they listened to illegal records of Italian dance projects and Hi-NRG artists such as Bobby Orlando, Giorgio Moroder and Divine. Inspired by this, they took the records to their studio and used electronic instruments to make "legal" sound-alikes of them. The members used pseudonyms such as "Adams & Fleisner" and "Tony Acardi", and formed various fictional bands and artists where the members were models and dancers hired for cover photograph shoots and lip-synced to songs sung by Bergman, Hessing and session performers. These included Fantastique, Gazuzu, Polysix, Master Genius, X-Ray Connection, Dr. Groove, Blanc De Blanc, Video Kids, Joanne Daniëls, Comfort & Joy, Party Freaks, and Twiggy Bop. Many of their dance and Italo disco records were released by Dutch labels such as Dureco Benelux and Boni Records (through their sublabel Break Records), founded by and named after Van den Bosch and Jan van Nieuwkoop in 1982.

=== Music career ===
In May 1983, Cat Music wrote, produced and released their first single for their studio project, Digital Emotion, called "Don't Stop". The single was based entirely on an electric bassline and inspired by Bobby Orlando, Giorgio Moroder and Divine. The repeated words "Don't stop," were sung through a vocoder by Hessing. The female vocals were done by Marian Pijnaker and Anita, Sylvia and Cindy Crooks of The Internationals. The single flopped due to its lack of an artist. Because of this, Cat Music wrote and produced their next single, "Get Up, Action", the vocals in it sung this time by Bergman and the Crooks, and hired three models and dancers, Steven Koswal, Chickie de Beer and Myrna Balrak, to be the faces of the project. The single was inspired by "Passion" by The Flirts. It sold well around the world upon release, as did its follow-up, "Go Go Yellow Screen", inspired by "Living on Video" by Trans-X (both "Living on Video" and "Go Go Yellow Screen" would later be used in "Let's Break" by Master Genius, another Cat Music project). Koswal and Balrak were later replaced by Steve de Goede and Marlinda van der Hoff.

In 1984, Digital Emotion released their debut album of the same name, Digital Emotion, which only contained six tracks, and the single "Steppin' Out". The album featured a photograph of De Beer, Balrak and Jean François Colombo on its cover. The success of Digital Emotion was consolidated by the release of the album Outside In The Dark in 1985, which included a remix of "Steppin' Out" by Peter Slaghuis. In addition to their music, the group also gained worldwide fame for their live performance; they first performed in Dutch disco clubs, before touring around Europe and performing in Eastern Bloc countries. After the first two albums, no others followed, and only singles and remixes were released. These included "Time (Back In Time)", "Jungle Beat" in 1986, "Dance To The Music" and a 12" remix of "Get Up, Action" in 1987 (with raps by Hessing), "Super Mega Mix" in 1988, and "I Need Your Love Tonight" in 1989. "Dance To The Music", the 12" remix of "Get Up, Action", "Super Mega Mix" and "I Need Your Love Tonight" were released by Disky, Cat Music (as "Replay Records") and IMC due to Boni Records' closure in 1987. The front covers of "Jungle Beat" and "Dance To The Music" featured two blonde girls in place of De Beer and Van der Hoff. In De Beer's case, she chose to leave the group and work as an executant at the DJAZZEX Modern-Jazz Dance Company and sing in a family band with her brothers. She was replaced with Nieke Ruhulessin for the live performances. In 1991, "Don't Stop" was released by Dance Device and IMC as "Don't Stop (The Rave)", with Cat Music producing the original single's "'91 Clubmix" and "Anversmix".

In 2004, Cat Music licensed "Don't Stop", "Get Up, Action", "Go Go Yellow Screen", "Dance To The Music" and "I Need Your Love Tonight" to Weton-Wesgram for inclusion in their compilation album Club Hits of the 80's. In 2008, they released Digital Emotion and Outside In The Dark on iTunes, Spotify and Apple Music. They would also release Club Hits of the 80's themselves on Apple Music that year. In 2014, Cat Music licensed Digital Emotion to MiruMir Music Publishing for release in Russia as Digital Emotion 30th Anniversary Edition. The reissued album was produced by Daniel Maslovsky, and included artwork recreated from the original art and restored by him. The album was reissued again in 2024 on Maslovsky's new label Maschina Records in Estonia, on 2CD with rare tracks and unreleased mixes on 29 January 2024, and on different coloured LP records on Bandcamp on 2 February 2024 and in March. In 2016, Cat Music resumed the project, writing the single "Full Control", which was produced by Edward Den Heijer, under the pseudonym "Eddy Mi Ami". The single was released by Cat Music in the Netherlands on 10 August 2016, and i Venti d'Azzurro Records through their sublabel Energy Level in Italy. On 6 September 2019, they released "You'll Be Mine/Run Away", followed by "Moving to the Top/Supernova" (with vocals in the former song by Marian Pijnaker) in 2021, "Arcade Serenade" in 2023. and "X-Wing Fighter" in 2026. In October 2023, "Don't Stop", "Get Up, Action", "Go Go Yellow Screen", "Full Control", "Attention", "You'll Be Mine", "Run Away", "Moving to the Top", "Supernova", "Arcade Serenade" and "Galaxy" were released as part of the compilation album Adams & Fleisner: The Ultimate Collection.

=== Personal lives ===
Chickie de Beer currently works as a dance teacher and secretary. Her youngest daughter Maya Mae is an upcoming singer and songwriter on Spotify and YouTube, while her eldest daughter Amber works in a care home for the elderly. Marlinda van der Hoff died of cancer in 2021.

== Legacy ==
The songs "Get Up, Action", "Go Go Yellow Screen" and "The Beauty and the Beast" were featured in the Nu Pogodi episode "High-Tech Center", albeit sped up. Aart Mol stated that Soyuzmultfilm did not ask Cat Music for permission to use the songs, and Cat Music did not receive any royalties for the songs' usage in the episode.

"Go Go Yellow Screen" has been covered and remixed several times by other artists throughout history, such as DJ 7Up in 2005, Cliff Wedge in his album Back To The 80's in 2009, Eloquent in their album Party Favours in 2012, Trans-X in their album Discolocos, Vol. 1 in 2018, and MD Station in 2020.

== Discography ==
=== Albums ===
- Digital Emotion (1984)
- Outside In The Dark (1985)

=== Singles ===
- "Don't Stop" (1983)
- "Get Up, Action" (1983)
- "Go Go Yellow Screen" (1983)
- "Steppin' Out" (1984)
- "Outside In The Dark" (1985)
- "Time (Back In Time)" (1985)
- "Jungle Beat" (1986)
- "Dance To The Music" (1987)
- "Super Mega Mix" (1988)
- "I Need Your Love Tonight" (1989)
- "Don't Stop (The Rave)" (1991)
- "Full Control" (2016)
- "You'll Be Mine/Run Away" (2019)
- "Moving to The Top/Supernova" (2021)
- "Arcade Serenade" (2023)
- "X-Wing Fighter" (2026)
