= Peter Slaghuis =

Dutch dance music DJ, producer and remixer

- Born: 21 August 1961; The Netherlands
- Died: 5 September 1991 (aged 30)
- Genre: House
- Occupations: DJ, record producer, remixer
- Years active: 1980-1991
- Formerly of: Video Kids

Peter Slaghuis (Dutch pronunciation: [ˈpeːtər ˈslɑxɦœys]; 21 August 1961 – 5 September 1991) was a Dutch DJ, record producer and remixer, whose work was mostly released under the name Hithouse (a literal translation of his last name — slag, a hit, a beat; and huis, house).

== Early years ==
Slaghuis was born in Rijswijk, Netherlands on 21 August 1961 to Helen (born in Malang, Indonesia) and Charles Slaghuis. As a child, he was unlucky, as he was always ill and would be in hospital. Fortunately, he got better when he turned 10, and grew into a healthy boy. Charles gave him and his sister Dana (born in 1961) their first cassette recorder. This led to Peter's love for music, while Dana was not interested.

== Career ==
=== Remixer ===
After graduating from school, Slaghuis began working as a DJ in a local club in The Hague in his teens in 1979. One day, he heard an illegal bootleg American megamix, which inspired him to try and copy the style. He was already mixing in the club while at home he was experimenting with the cassette recorder's pause button's editing technique. Using this he created his first remix, a 3/4-hour long remix of "Dancing Queen" by ABBA.

Slaghuis made a name for himself as a remixer in the 1980s, producing popular remixes of various hits. In his home studio at his parents' house, he made music by taking samples from obscure records and pieces of music, mixing them together into his own self-produced tracks. He secured connections with the "Disco Breaks" bootleg label and started creating megamixes and remixes for them. Some of the earlier mixes were actually created on cassette, including the rare "Dutch Mix" of "Lay All Your Love on Me" by ABBA. As more equipment piled into his studio at his parents' home, he became more certain of his future. He was always playing his mixes in clubs with great reactions from the crowds, being one of the first DJs to do so, along with Ben Liebrand. He worked extensively with Erik van Vliet and Michiel van der Kuy from 1982 onwards, producing remixes for their Euro disco/Italo disco projects Sisley Ferré (with vocals by Jody Pijper) in 1987-1990 and Laserdance ("Megamix Vol. 1") in 1988. With his fame, Slaghuis managed to get a place as a DJ at the BlueTiek-in in Rotterdam in 1985. He bought his own Akai S900 sampler, being one of the first people to have one.

His big break as a remixer came in 1986 with the Vocal/Long "Dutch Mix" of "I Can't Wait" by Nu Shooz. Injection Disco Dance Label asked him to produce the remix of the song. Slaghuis hated the song and initially did not want to remix it, but eventually decided to produce the remix, making it in an hour. He added a synthesizer melody over the top, as well as some vocal samples (including one from "Loveride" by Nuance), sound effects and a sample of "Into the Groove" by Madonna. Injection loved the remix and offered Slaghuis royalties, and as he did not rate the track, he took 500 guilders. He realised his mistake and became disappointed about losing a large amount of money, sitting at his kitchen table and crying. Atlantic Records would later invite him to work in their studio in New York City, where he was allowed to remix other Nu Shooz songs for their album, Poolside, only one of which was used. Slaghuis sent mixes to Ferry Maat's Soulshow. He also worked for the Disco Mix Club for some time, producing mixes of songs such as "La Isla Bonita" and "True Blue" by Madonna, "Respectable" by Mel and Kim, "Rock the Night" by Europe, and even "I Can't Wait" by Nu Shooz, for which he was paid decently. His first mix for the Disco Mix Club, "Slag It Off", was put onto vinyl. Later that year, Slaghuis remixed "Just Buggin' (Nothing Serious)" by Whistle and "How To Win Your Love" by Spencer Jones, and produced the "Evelyn Thomas Megamix". He was asked by Maat to make an annual mix for Soulshow, which he created more as a contrast rather than competition to Ben Liebrand's similar year mix for Radio Veronica. In 1988, he and Eddy Ouwens remixed "Downtown" by Petula Clark as "Downtown '88", which reached its No. 10 peak on the UK Singles Chart on 24 December 1988.

=== Video Kids ===
In 1984, Slaghuis was asked to join the Euro disco project Video Kids, which released songs such as "Woodpeckers from Space", which became a number 1 hit in Spain and Norway, and "Do the Rap". He was featured in the videos for both songs alongside Bianca Bonelli and Tico Tac, the group's cartoon mascot. They released two albums, The Invasion of the Spacepeckers in 1984 and On Satellite in 1985. The songs were written and produced by Catapult musicians Aart Mol, Cees Bergman (who provided the vocals that Slaghuis lip-synced to), Elmer Veerhoff, Erwin van Prehn and Geertjan Hessing (under the aliases "Adams & Fleisner" and "Tony Acardi"), and recorded at Cat Music. Slaghuis had previously done remixes for Cat Music's other projects, such as the "Special European Edit" of "After The Rainbow" by Joanne Daniëls (along with Emile Noorhoek) and "Steppin' Out" by Digital Emotion, and would later use "Woodpeckers from Space" in the seventh instalment in "Disco Breaks". A cover version of "Woodpeckers from Space" was made by the South African group Café Society in 1985. Even though Video Kids provided him with a lot of experience in the entertainment industry, Slaghuis expressed disapproval of the project, considering it a sidestep in his career. He left the project that year, and was replaced with René Portegies.

=== Hip hop ===
In 1987, Slaghuis met then-unknown rapper Extince, who told him that he had released the single "Rap Around The Clock" the previous year. Slaghuis did not like the single, but decided to work with the rapper. He produced the beat behind Extince's single "The Milkshake Rap", using the pseudonym "Mr. Donald". The single's sound was heavily influenced by Mantronix and used McDonald's' advertising music. This, however, led to legal trouble with the fast food chain, who did not appreciate their music being used without permission. The single had to be withdrawn from the market and was replaced by a "clean" version named "The Milkshake Rapremix". Slaghuis produced a few more singles for Extince, "The Girlie Girlie Prince" and "Black Betty", although they were not very successful. In 1989, he produced "I Can Handle It" by Mister Mixi & Skinny Scotty. The rappers had success abroad and they also released the album Tea House, on which Slaghuis produced eight songs. In 1990, he produced the single "Somebody In The House Say Yeah!" with DJ Paul Elstak by rap crew The Timedrillers. He also produced the single "Unarmed and Dangerous" by M.C. Hughie Babe.

=== House pioneer ===
As a DJ at the BlueTiek-in, Slaghuis was one of the first to market the genre of house music in the Netherlands. The first house music that was played was the Chicago house sound, but it was not well-received by the people at the club, who did not understand that kind of music. Because of this, it was played at the end of the night so that everyone would leave early, so that when the club was empty, the crew could go home on time as well. People later began to appreciate the sound, and the club was packed until closing time. There he met DJ Paul Elstak, who worked with him and became his student as a younger DJ. Elstak previously did not know Slaghuis due to his dislike of "Woodpeckers from Space". In December 1986, Slaghuis produced and released his first house track for the Disco Mix Club, "Samplification". In 1988, he composed, arranged and produced the single "House Control", going under the pseudonym "El Farid" and working with Eric van Vliet. With the arrival of house music in Europe, he took up the pseudonym "Hithouse" (a literal translation of his last name) and began using his sampling techniques in this field. He produced and released a remix of "The Second Time Around" by Shalamar and a new version of "Samplification" named "Samplification (Part 2)" under the pseudonym "Wise Guys", both of which sold in their millions. At this point he decided that it was time to move into an apartment of his own, to house his rapidly-building studio.

In November 1988, Slaghuis scored a hit with his best known work, "Jack to the Sound of the Underground". The idea for the single came from remixing "Pink Cadillac" by Natalie Cole for the Disco Mix Club. Slaghuis loved the bassline but disliked the drums, so he just changed the percussion using a Roland TR-909 drum machine, and added some samples and another four basslines using Akai samplers. The single used a lot of samples for which Slaghuis had to pay royalties over, such as "Doctorin' the House" by Coldcut and Yazz, "Music" by Montreal Sound, "Jack to the Sound" by Fast Eddie and "You're No Good for Me" by Kelly Charles. It entered the UK Singles Chart on 5 November 1988 and reached No. 14 on 3 December 1988 and number 57 in Australia, and became a hit in almost every country in Europe, except in Slaghuis' own country, the Netherlands, where it only reached the No. 22 position of the charts. The song's music video was directed and edited by Slaghuis himself at Creators International, with art direction by Cello Hoekstra, and also featured Paul Elstak, Marianne from The Hague (the person lip-syncing to the Kelly Charles sample), Slaghuis' girlfriend Helen Willemse, and other BlueTiek-in employees. It was shot in a gas factory in the Netherlands. The synthesizer that Slaghuis plays in the video was a Casio SK-1. The BlueTiek-in would close down shortly after the single's success. In 1989, "Jack to the Sound of the Underground" would later be used as the theme song for the radio and television versions of the BBC comedy show The Mary Whitehouse Experience. Slaghuis released "Move Your Feet to the Rhythm of the Beat", which was very successful as well in April that year. The song shared the same musical formula as its predecessor: catchy Hi-NRG loops mixed with a collection of samples, though it lacked the catchy hook lines present in the first release. It only reached No. 69 on the UK Singles Chart on 19 August 1989. In the Netherlands, it reached the No. 28 position of the charts. Slaghuis also released the album Hithouse, which contained every style of music including acid, Latin, Hi-NRG, house and hip hop. One of the tracks, called "Everybody (Got To Get Some)", was a Todd Terry-type acid track, with vocals by Crystal P. Using the money that he earned from both singles, he bought a farmhouse in Appeltern, which also housed his new studio.

In November 1989, Slaghuis was looking for a singer for his new single, a disco song called "Take On Me". He met Rob Koning, who was very busy breaking through as a singer, and showed him a demo of the song. Koning performed the vocals, and was given a rough version of the demo, which he still has on cassette. He returned to redo one verse in the demo a week later, due to ARS Records' (Slaghuis' record company) dissatisfaction with said verse. Slaghuis and Koning decided to call the demo Hithouse featuring Jeremo, since Koning was working under the name "Jeremo" at the time. Slaghuis asked Koning if he also wanted to be part of "Hithouse" during a promotional tour through Europe for the upcoming single, but Koning declined due to being in a relationship and having a full-time job at the time. Because of this, Slaghuis initially planned to have someone lip-sync the song. However, ARS Records wanted someone who would be a permanent member of the group and also had to sing on the single, which would still be a problem during live performances. As a result, the song was cancelled, much to Slaghuis and Koning's disappointment. The single would eventually be released in 1990 as "The Right Time", with vocals by Ignace Baert. Despite this, Koning would have some contacts with Slaghuis' management company Scorpio Angency afterwards, where he was under contract as a soloist, and the original demo of "Take On Me" was included in his 1999 compilation CD The Early Demo Recordings. Slaghuis would later produce "Luv' Hitpack" by Luv'.

In 1990, Slaghuis founded his own label, Hithouse Records. As the manager of Hithouse Records, he discovered young talented producers such as Ferry Corsten, Paul Elstak, Michel de Hey and Speedy J, who released some of their first records on the label. He also worked with some of them under the name "Problem House", released the singles "A Bright Day" (featuring Dave D.M.D.) and "I've Been Waiting for Your Love" (made with Réjane Magloire from Indeep), and was part of electronic dance music group Holy Noise, consisting of Elidio Gomes, Elstak, Richard van Naamen and Rob Fabrie, with vocals by MC Alee. In 1991, they released the album Organoised Crime and the single "James Brown Is Still Alive!!" (in response to "James Brown Is Dead" by L.A. Style), which reached the top 10 in the Dutch Top 40. Slaghuis also worked on an album called "Acute Sense Of Hearing".

== Death ==
On 5 September 1991, Slaghuis died in a head-on car accident involving an oncoming truck on the A2 motorway, while he was driving home from a DJ gig in Amsterdam. He was 30. A funeral service was held for him by his closest family members and friends shortly afterwards, and his ashes were spread around a local river. Paul Elstak continued the Holy Noise project after Slaghuis' death. He and the other members went back into his studio to finish and release some tracks, such as "Get Down Everybody" and "James Brown Is Still Alive!!". Holy Noise was temporarily continued by Rotterdam Records, and later by ARS Productions to fulfill the obligations entered into. Slaghuis' mongrel dog, Husky, died seven years later in 1998.

In an episode of Het Zesde Zintuig in 2007, his mother Helen Slaghuis believed that it was possible that her son's death occurred because someone had drugged him over a money issue. However, no evidence of this has been found. The episode also revealed that Peter was homosexual and that his nickname was "Patsie".

== Legacy ==
Slaghuis left a significant legacy to the world of electronic dance music and sampling. His work as a mixer, producer and DJ continues to be an inspiration to many DJs in the Netherlands and around the world. The Kelly Charles sample used in "Jack to the Sound of the Underground" resurfaced in 1994, as the vocal sample in the Prodigy's major international hit, "No Good (Start the Dance)". In 1999, D.O.D.S. and Klubbheads did remixes of "Jack to the Sound of the Underground", released by Mo'Bizz Recordings.

In February 2001, after contacting Slaghuis' parents and his sister Dana, Jerry Beke, who is a fan of the producer's work, came into possession of his sample library and recording equipment, which is still used today by other Dutch DJs and producers. In 2012, he, Koen Groeneveld and Addy van der Zwan did a remix pack of "Jack to the Sound of the Underground" as a tribute to Slaghuis, released on Spinnin' Records. For his remix, Groeneveld gave it a techy touch while Van der Zwan and Beke stayed true to the housey origin of the track. Beke also wrote a chapter in the book Rotterdam In The House about the importance of Slaghuis, stating, "Peter took samples from the most obscure old records, sometimes real rubbish records. But he then took some samples, mixed them together and turned them into hits. His records largely consisted of samples, which he cleverly mixed together into one track. Peter was a sound artist. In the 1980s you had Ben Liebrand and Peter Slaghuis, who were the two master mixers, the absolute best. With Liebrand, a mix always had to sound very smooth and neat. With Peter you sometimes heard some noise or a piece of an old record at the end of a mix. Peter was looser and rawer in his sound, less polished. That appealed to a lot of people." Ben Liebrand described Slaghuis as "so very creative, and such a very kind guy".

On 5 September 2016, Michael Halve of Fantasy Radio made a music video for Disco Breaks 10 to honour Slaghuis. Three years later on 27 February 2019, XXL Radio Rotterdam produced a music video for Slaghuis' 1987 Yearmix for Soulshow. On 23 March 2020, Radio Stad Den Haag ran a Special Tribute Show on air to recognize the producer's genius. On 28 November 2025, Uitgeverij Aspekt published the book Voor altijd een belofte: Een muzikale biografie van Peter Slaghuis ("Forever a Promise: A Musical Biography of Peter Slaghuis"), which described Slaghuis' life.
