= The Surfers (Dutch group) =

Dutch pop group

- Origin: Holland
- Genres: Pop
- Years active: 1978–1981
- Label: CNR Records
- Past members: The Surfers; Paul Braaksma; Patrick Elalouf; Nico Fontijn; Ivan Groeneveld; Cathy Leonupun; Marijke Meyer; Esther Oosterbeek; Session members Ed van Toorenburg; Bart van Schoonhoven; André Sommer; Anita Crooks; Sylvia Crooks; Cindy Crooks

The Surfers were a Dutch pop group from Haarlem in 1978 to 1981. The group was a studio project produced and written by Jaap Eggermont and Catapult musicians Aart Mol, Cees Bergman, Elmer Veerhoff, Erwin van Prehn and Geertjan Hessing. The songs were sung by session singers, but a stage act was formed for television, fronted by Nico Fontijn, and also consisting of six other singers. They had a hit in 1978 with the single "Windsurfin'", and managed to chart again twice in 1979 and 1980.

== Background ==
Catapult, a glam rock band formed by and consisting of Aart Mol, Cees Bergman, Erwin van Prehn and Geertjan Hessing and later joined by Elmer Veerhoff, had scored a number of hits in the 1970s; "Let Your Hair Hang Down" and "Teeny Bopper Band" were two of the band's hits. As their popularity began to fade, the band decided that it was time for something different. They wanted to make music in different styles, which was difficult because of their Leiden dialect and Dutch radio stations and television channels' refusal to accept the quintet's ability to do so. With advice from Dutch DJ Willem van Kooten, they started writing and producing songs for other artists, including Lia Velasco, Patricia Paay, Liberation of Man, The Internationals, Rita Hovink, and Snoopy. In 1977, they formed Cat Music in Hazerswoude-Rijndijk.

Due to the popularity of windsurfing in the 1970s, Van Kooten, the members and producer Jaap Eggermont decided to write a song about the new craze, named "Windsurfin'". The song was also written by Eggermont's wife, Lucia Flint. The members had just released the single "Zuipen" as Rubberen Robbie at the time. For the song, a group called The Surfers was formed by manager Han Meijer. Van Kooten and Eggermont recruited Ed van Toorenburg, Bart van Schoonhoven, André Sommer, and Anita, Sylvia and Cindy Crooks of The Internationals to record the song at Cat Music. For television and live performances, Nico Fontijn, Paul Braaksma, Iwan Groeneveld, Patrick Elalouf, Cathy Leonupun, Marijke Meyer and Esther Oosterbeek were brought together to lip-sync to the song.

== Career ==
Debuting on 8 July 1978, "Windsurfin'" spent 14 weeks on the Dutch Singles Chart, peaking at No. 2. 200,000 copies were sold in the Netherlands. It also made it to No. 2 in Belgium and No. 16 in Germany. It was reported by Billboard in the 16 December issue that titles from The Surfers, as well as other artists such as Long Tall Ernie, La Belle Epoque, and Sheila B. Devotion had the biggest impact for Hamburg publishing company Roba.

In 1979, the group released "Windsurfing-Time Again". It made its debut on 14 July 1979. The debut was recorded in the 4 August issue of Billboard. The single peaked at No. 5 in the Netherlands and spent eight weeks in the chart. It also spent six weeks in the Belgian charts, peaking at No. 13. In 1980, the group released the single "Girls on the Beach". Spending four weeks in the charts in the Netherlands, the single peaked at No. 32. In 1981, the group released their final single, "Let's Go Surfin'". By that time, they had ceased to exist. The song "Do You Like Surfing?" was originally written for the group, but was repurposed for the Video Kids album The Invasion of the Spacepeckers.

In 1999, "Windsurfin'", "Windsurfing-Time Again" and "Girls On the Beach" were included in the compilation album Cat Nuggets, released by Red Bullet. In 2020, "Windsurfin'", "Nite At the Beach", "Windsurfing-Time Again", "Wind Blows in My Sail", "Girls On the Beach", "Summertime Tension", "Let's Go Surfin'" and "Summer's Here Again" were released as part of the compilation album The Golden Years Of Dutch Pop Music by Universal.

== Line up ==
- Cathy Leonupun - vocals
- Esther Oosterbeek (Dolly Dots) - vocals
- Iwan Groeneveld (Spooky) - vocals
- Marijke Meyer - vocals
- Nico Fontijn (Marileens, Onkruid, Shake) - vocals
- Patrick Elalouf - vocals
- Paul Braaksma - guitar

== Discography ==
- "Windsurfin'" / "Night at the Beach", CNR 141 474, 1978
- "Windsurfing-Time Again" / "Wind Blows in My Sail", CNR 141 552, 1979
- "Girls On the Beach" / "Summertime Tension", CNR 141 646, 1980
- "Let's Go Surfin'" / "Summer's Here Again", CNR 141 770, 1981
