= Woodpeckers from Space =

Single by Video Kids

from the album The Invasion of the Spacepeckers
- B-side: "Rap and Sing Along"
- Released: September 4, 1984
- Recorded: 1983–1984
- Genre: Eurodisco; synth-pop; novelty song
- Length: 5:54 (album version); 3:34 (single version)
- Label: Polydor
- Songwriters: Aart Mol, Cees Bergman, Elmer Veerhoff, Erwin van Prehn, Geertjan Hessing ("Adams & Fleisner")
- Producers: Aart Mol, Cees Bergman, Elmer Veerhoff, Erwin van Prehn, Geertjan Hessing ("Adams & Fleisner")

Video Kids singles chronology
"Woodpeckers from Space" (1984)	"Do the Rap" (1985)

"Woodpeckers from Space" is a song by the Dutch eurodisco duo Video Kids. A synth-pop cover of "The Woody Woodpecker Song", it was released in 1984 by Boni Records through their sublabel Break Records as the duo's debut single, as well as the sixth track from their debut studio album, The Invasion of the Spacepeckers (1984).

== Background ==
The song was written and produced by Aart Mol, Cees Bergman, Elmer Veerhoff, Erwin van Prehn and Geertjan Hessing (under the pseudonym "Adams & Fleisner"), all of whom were former members of the Dutch glam rock band Catapult.

The idea for the song began when Gert van den Bosch's (co-founder of Boni Records) children asked him if he could produce a record based on Woody Woodpecker, whom they were big fans of. The song was recorded at Cat Music (which Mol, Bergman, Veerhoff, Van Prehn and Hessing had formed in 1977, and later 1981), with its name inspired by "Invaders from Space" by Dynamic Seven in 1983. The vocals were done by Bergman, Hessing and Anita and Sylvia Crooks of the vocal trio The Internationals. The Woody laugh (provided by Hessing) used in the song was first heard in "Let's Break" by Master Genius in 1983, another Cat Music project.

In order to avoid being sued by Universal Studios, a new character named Tico Tac, a "spacepecker", was created as the group's mascot. Tico was named after the song of the same name by Polysix, and designed by Boni Records cover designer Dirk Arend (going under the pseudonym "Fruut" at the time). The character was later redesigned by Bjørn Frank Jensen and coloured by Frits Godhelp at Toonder Studio's.

The album version of the song features sound effects from the Speak & Spell toy, sampled from "Home Computer" by Kraftwerk.

== Music video ==
The music video starred Peter Slaghuis and Bianca Bonelli, hired by Cat Music to be the members of the group. Slaghuis had done remixes of Cat Music's other projects, such as the Special European Edit of "After The Rainbow" by Joanne Daniëls (along with Emile Noorhoek) and "Steppin' Out" by Digital Emotion, and would later use "Woodpeckers from Space" in the seventh instalment in his "Disco Breaks" bootleg series, while Bonelli would later have a solo single called "Je Veux L'amour (Follow Me)", also written and produced by Cat Music.

In the video, Tico plays pranks on the Slaghuis/Bonelli flight crew, messing with their spaceship. The video was filmed in the Airplane Museum at Amsterdam Airport Schiphol. Peter, Bianca and the flight crew's pilots and scientists (played by Cat Music themselves, except Aart Mol and Geertjan Hessing) lip-sync to Cees Bergman, Hessing and Anita and Sylvia Crooks' vocals during the video. The former two's costumes were personally sewn by Peter's mother, Helen Slaghuis. Tico was animated by Bjørn Frank Jensen, Frits Godhelp and Harrie Geelen.

== Cover versions ==
The song was covered by the South African outfit Café Society in 1985, with their version holding the No. 1 position on the South African Top 20 for 7 weeks; Doctor Pecker and Aleksandr Kalyanov (as "Karabas-Barabas") in 1986, The Smurfs in 1995, V-Kid in 1999, Swedish singer Evelyn in 2001, Norwegian bubblegum/trance/dance group SpritneyBears in 2003 (their cover laid in second place on the Norwegian chart, spending 8 weeks on that chart in total), Cirez D in 2004, and Kidz Hitz Party 2: Back To School in 2007.

== In popular culture ==
The song was featured in the 1986 pilot episode of Pingu as well as the original version of the episode "Pingu Looks After the Egg", whereas the redubbed version of the latter has the Flemish Dutch cover of David Hasselhoff's "Pingu-Dance" by Chris Van Tongelen in its place.

== Charts ==
Chart (1984/1985)	Peak position
Austria (Ö3 Austria Top 40)	15
Belgium (Ultratop 50 Flanders)	17
Denmark (Hitlisten)	4
Netherlands (Dutch Top 40)	14
Norway (VG-lista)	1
Spain (AFYVE)	1
Sweden (Sverigetopplistan)	8
Switzerland (Schweizer Hitparade)	6
UK Singles (OCC)	72
West Germany (GfK)	4

== See also ==
- "Woody Boogie"
