= Café Society (disambiguation) =

Café society is a fashionable lifestyle.

Café Society may refer to:

- Café Society (1938–1948), a New York City nightclub
- Cafe Society (1939 film)
- Café Society (British band), active 1973-1976
- Café Society (South African band), active 1984-1986
- "Cafe Society", a song by Al Stewart appearing on his 1984 album Russians & Americans
- Cafe Society (1995 film)
- Café Society (2016 film), directed by Woody Allen
