= ExitMundi.nl =

Website for end-of-the-world scenarios

ExitMundi.nl defunct
- Website type: Collection of End-of-World Scenarios
- Available in: English
- Owner: Maarten Keulemans
- Website: ExitMundi.nl
- Registration: Optional (required for forum)
- Launched: 2001
- Current status: Not active

ExitMundi.nl was a website with a collection of end of the world articles. The writing mixes scientific analyses and theories of apocalyptic scenarios with dark humour relating to the end of times. Theories presented cover a range of possible sources of human demise. The site is based in the Netherlands. Disease, nuclear war, asteroids, even fictional scenarios like zombies are laid out in detailed and thoroughly researched descriptions.

In May 2008, a rewritten selection of 50 end-of-world scenarios was published as a book in the Netherlands: Exit Mundi, het einde van de wereld. De beste 50 scenario's. Translations are in the works. The German edition was published in June 2010 by dtv.

In February 2011, the German artist Bela B recorded the double cd Exit Mundi, with ten scenarios from the German translation of Exit Mundi. At the release of the cd, Bela B. did a 15 location-tour with the Exit Mundi cd through Germany, Switzerland and Austria, reading the texts from Exit Mundi on stage and even singing texts from the book to the tune of R.E.M.'s hit single It's The End Of The World As We Know It.

== Early history ==
Maarten Keulemans launched the website in 2001 strictly for fun. In several interviews, he points out that the main reason for launching the site was that as a professional science journalist, he came across many apocalyptic scenarios, ranging from well-known disasters like black holes and supervolcanoes to less well-known events like the Big Crunch or mass suicide.

As time passed, Keulemans kept on collecting more and more scenarios, aided by a growing number of devoted Exit Mundi fans. His mix of sardonic humor and scientific correctness gave the website cult status. The website got many good reviews on- and offline, in magazines as diverse as New Scientist, Playboy and several Dutch leading newspapers.

Meanwhile, Keulemans, who always insisted on keeping the website low profile and not for profit, ended up in many radio shows, written interviews and on TV. 'I sort of became Mister Apocalypse', he muses in the introduction to Exit Mundi the book.

== Books and projects ==
In May 2008, a rewritten selection of 50 end-of-world scenarios was published as a book by AW Bruna in the Netherlands: Exit Mundi, het einde van de wereld. De beste 50 scenario's. The book takes the formula of the website to the extremes: the scenarios are more carefully researched, and written with even more puns than the website. In the Netherlands, the book was quite successful, ending up in the non-fiction bestseller lists of 2008, selling out two editions and receiving a lot of praise in the press.

Meanwhile, Keulemans himself went on tour, talking about the end of the world in his own words, aided only by a powerpoint and a few simple gimmicks. The tour took him to most Dutch universities, several art festivals and other small venues.

At the 3 October Festival in Leiden 2009, a group of artists adapted Exit Mundi into a show of scary tableaux vivants.

In June 2010, publisher dtv released the German edition of Exit Mundi, the book. The book got some good reviews, and even made it to the non-fiction bestseller charts of Der Spiegel. But more was to come, as German singer/artist Bela B took notice of the book. Bela decided to do an Exit Mundi audio book in German, which was released in early 2011 by Random House.

It turned Exit Mundi into a big success in Germany, especially when Bela B started touring Germany, Switzerland and Austria, reading and even singing from the book on stage.
