= Tower (Dutch band) =

Dutch symphonic rock pop band

- Origin: Leiden, Netherlands
- Genres: Symphonic rock, pop
- Years active: 1975–1984, 2012–present
- Labels: Dureco Benelux, CNR Records
- Members: Marian Pijnaker; Dimitri Versteeg; Frans Wisse; Ton Hoogenboom; Ruth Jochems; Eric Kruitof; Bas Brandsma; Willem Jan Nijhuis
- Past members: Ed te Pas; Hans Prins; Leo de Gee; Freek te Pas; Loes Hoogenboom; Hans Hollestelle; Roy Poncin; Bob Poncin; Henk van Loon; Ben Peterzen; Cor van der Hoogt; Inge Rijnja; Katinka van der Harst; Marcel Bazuin; Alex Haak

Tower is a symphonic rock pop band from Leiden, Netherlands. The band was formed and began performing in 1975, but disbanded in 1984, before reuniting in 2012. They became best known for their hit singles "See You Tonight" and "Goin' Home", which respectively reached the 11th and 20th places of the European charts in 1982, including Belgium and the Netherlands.

== History ==
The band was formed by Henk van Loon in March 1975, with the first tryouts taking place in April of that year. Six weeks after the formation, the group went into a studio to record a demo for Phonogram Records, but this unfortunately did not lead to a deal. During the summer, the band played a lot and made further attempts at improving their repertoire with band coach Ron Westerbeek from the rock band Water. Tower's first appearance on radio was in August 1975 on Katholieke Radio Omroep's Van 12 Tot 2. In October, the group originally consisted of Van Loon himself as keyboardist, guitarist Ed te Pas, singer and electronic pianist Hans Prins, drummer Leo de Gee, and bassist Freek te Pas. In 1977, Van Loon was the only remaining member of the original lineup, joined by bassist Ben Peterzen, guitarist Coor van der Hoogt, drummer Ton Hoogenboom, and singer Loes Hoogenboom. In 1980, Hoogenboom left the band, so auditions were held for a replacement singer. Marian Pijnaker, who had previously played in the band Ruïns as a keyboardist, was approached by the band's manager, and was hired as the lead singer after her audition.

In 1982, the band rehearsed in The Jam in Leiden. Someone at the restaurant put them in touch with Cat Music, a studio formed in Rijnsaterwoude by Catapult musicians Aart Mol, Cees Bergman, Elmer Veerhoff, Erwin van Prehn and Geertjan Hessing. The musicians wrote and produced a song named "See You Tonight", which the band themselves performed. It was released as a single by Dureco Records on 13 January 1982. The single became a major hit in the charts on Hilversum 3 upon release; it reached the No. 12 position in the Nationale Hitparade in early 1982 and the No. 11 position in the Dutch Top 40, and peaked at the No. 9 position in the TROS Top 50. "See Me Tonight" was chosen as the 178th NOS Support Record of the week by Frits Spits and Tom Blomberg on De Avondspits on 18 January 1982, the former of whom would say every night, "Tower, wat een Power!" ("Tower, what a Power!"). The band would later release their debut album Titan. The band's songs, which were reminiscent of the Electric Light Orchestra, featured original and atypical instrumentation and classical elements, including the violin, played by Hans Hollestelle. Roy and Bob Poncin also participated in the album's production as a drummer and bassist, respectively. Pijnaker's vocals have often been compared to those of British singer Kim Wilde. Their next single, "Goin' Home", reached No. 20 in the Nationale Hitparade in August 1982, and No. 15 in both the Dutch Top 40 and TROS Top 50. In Belgium, the single reached the No. 19 position in the charts, staying there for three weeks. In Germany, the single was in the charts for one week. It was included in the compilation album High Life – Unkürzte Original Top-Hits Winter 82/83, released by Polystar Records.

Prior to Tower's success, Pijnaker and Van der Hoogt had already performed the vocals of the duos Fantastique and Gazuzu at Cat Music, with Dick Van Dam and Astrid Leuwener (Fantastique) and Annelies Graave and René Portegies (Gazuzu) as the faces of the projects. Pijnaker also performed for other artists, projects and demos by Cat Music, such as André Hazes and Digital Emotion. Fantastique's single "Mama Told Me" was particularly successful in British discos, having several rereleases and reaching No. 84 on the UK Singles Chart in 1986. In September 1982, the band was arrested on suspicion of smuggling records after a concert performance in East Berlin, as selling records was illegal in the country at the time. They had a suitcase containing singles and LP records for promotional use. Their manager convinced the police that they did not know about the regulations. The members were allowed to return to their hotel, except without their suitcase, which was confiscated by the police.

Following their initial success, the band released two more songs from the album as singles, "Titan/Spaceman" and "Get Back". In 1983-1984, "Spaceman" was included in the compilation album Stolen From Madhouse-Axel, released by Polydor Records, and the band released "Hey Amigo" and "It's Allright", both of which did not make it into the charts. The group split up due to the rise of house music, which their symphonic-oriented pop music did not fit. The members performed in other groups and bands; Pijnaker and Van der Hoogt formed a new group called Split Decision to continue the success of Tower in 1985. The group released only one single, "Action", written and produced by Robert Pot from Future World Orchestra. Pijnaker performed in Utility from 1991 to 2007, formed Second Avenue with Ben Schutte Jr., toured with Harry Slinger from Drukwerk, and played with Dimitri Versteeg in cover bands. Van der Hoogt became the lead singer and guitarist of De Stevige Staartmannen.

In 1999, "See You Tonight" and "Goin' Out" were included in the compilation albums Pop Van Eigen Bodem - Tachtiger Jaren, released by PolyGram TV, and Cat Nuggets, released by Red Bullet. In 2010, Edwin Evers asked listeners of Radio 538 which band from the 1980s they would like to hear again. Most of them voted for Tower. The album Titan was released by Fonos and CNR Records that year. On 15 September 2012, Tower gave a reunion concert at De Meester in Zoeterwoude. Van Loon was replaced with Frans Wisse. The following day on 16 September 2013, they performed at the Legends Festival in Apeldoorn. As a result of the reunion, the band released a new song, "Show Me", to YouTube in 2013, and were given approval by CNR to record a new album. In 2015, they released "Rainfall (Special Edition - Dedicated to Michel)".

In April 2021, Van Loon received an award for his contribution to Dutch pop music. Later that year, Van der Hoogt broke his right shoulder during an accident. Following a false initial diagnosis, he had an operation 10 days later, and was told that his recovery would take some time. In 2022, a meet and greet and mini concert were planned to take place at De Meester on 3 July of that year, and the band rehearsed in three months. However, rehearsals became more physically demanding and painful for Van der Hoogt, as his recovery did not go smoothly, so the meet and greet was cancelled. In November 2024, the band performed during the opening concert "Het echte geluid van de jaren '80" ("The Real Sound of the 80s") in de Vlijt in Zevenhoven, joined by guitarist Dimitri Versteeg (replacing Van der Hoogt), bassist Ruth Jochems, and guest backing singers Inge Rijnja and Katinka van der Harst. On 26 September-28 November 2025, Tower performed "Jamband" sessions at the Dorpspunt venue in Stompwijk, joined by guitarists Marcel Bazuin and Eric Kruitof, drummer Bas Brandsma, saxophonist Willem Jan Nijhuis, and Alex Haak.

=== Personal lives ===
Pijnaker worked as a teacher at The Rockschool, HIP School in The Hague, and Sport en Welzijn in Leidschendam-Voorburg. In January 2014, she founded her own studio in Stompwijk, Zangstudio The Voice, where she gives singing lessons. Beginning in September 2019, she also presented the radio program Click Track with Ron van der Tuijn, heard weekly on Wednesday from 9:00 pm to 10:00 pm. In April 2025, she started working for Music Productions Group. Peterzen died at the age of 70 on 31 May 2025. Van Loon died at the age of 77 six months later on 17 November 2025.

== Discography ==
=== Albums ===
- Titan (1982)

=== Singles ===
- "See You Tonight" (1982)
- "Goin' Home" (1982)
- "Titan/Spaceman" (1982)
- "Get Back" (1983)
- "Hey Amigo" (1983)
- "It's Allright" (1984)
- "Show Me" (2013)
- "Rainfall (Special Edition - Dedicated to Michel)" (2015)
