= The Invasion of the Spacepeckers =

Studio album by Video Kids
- Released: December 1984
- Genre: Euro disco, synth-pop
- Length: 34:27
- Label: Break Records

Video Kids chronology
| The Invasion of the Spacepeckers (1984) | On Satellite (1985) |

The Invasion of the Spacepeckers is the debut album of the Dutch Euro disco duo Video Kids. It was released by Break Records on vinyl and tape in December 1984, by Polydor Records in 1985, the album also contained a large "Happy Birthday" calendar, in which children could write birthday wishes to their friend. In 1985, the album was released at the Midem music festival, and went on to sell 1.1 million copies. Video Kids received the RIAA Gold Record Award and Conamus Export Award for their international success with the album. Two music videos for "Woodpeckers from Space" and "Do the Rap" were produced and released, both of which feature Peter Slaghuis, Bianca Bonelli, and Tico Tac, the band's cartoon mascot.

On 22 April 2014, The Invasion of the Spacepeckers was released by MiruMir Music Publishing in Russia. The reissued album included the original "Happy Birthday" calendar and Tico Tac: Spacepecker (a promotional comic strip drawn by Bjørn Frank Jensen), and expanded artwork recreated from the original art by Daniel Maslovsky. Maslovsky was also the producer of the album. He did an interview with Aart Mol, which was later published on Zvuki as part of a promotional campaign for the album's release. It also included a comic strip named Tico Tac: The Woodpecker from Space. The album was reissued again in 2024 on Maslovsky's new label Maschina Records in Estonia, on 2CD with rare tracks and unreleased mixes on 29 January 2024, and on different coloured LP records on Bandcamp on 2 February 2024 and in March.

== Track listing ==
=== Official tracks ===
Side A

1. "Do the Rap" (4:11)
2. "Cartooney Tunes" (incl. "Happy Birthday") (4:20)
3. "La Bamba" (4:15)
4. "I'm a Rock n' Roll Pecker" (2:05)
5. "Communication Outerspace" (3:06)

Side B

6. "Woodpeckers from Space" (5:54)
7. "Give Me That Banana" (4:04)
8. "Do You Like Surfing?" (3:17)
9. "Sky Rider" (3:13)

Bonus tracks (2024 reissue)

10. "Woodpeckers from Space" (1984 7" Version)
11. "Rap and Sing-Along" (1984 7" Version)
12. "Rap and Sing-Along" (1984 12" Version)
13. "Do the Rap" (1985 7" Version)
14. "Do the Rap" (1985 12" Version)
15. "Happy Birthday" / "Sky Rider" (1985)
16. "Pink Panther's Motion" (1986, originally released by Magical Ring Records)
17. "The Man From Santiago" (1985, originally released on Question Mark's Famous Tunes by Boni Records)

Woodpeckers from Space (remixes '86-'01, 2024 reissue)

18. "Woodpeckers from Space" (1986 7" Version) by S. Mortali
19. "Woodpeckers from Space" (1986 12" Version) by S. Mortali
20. "Woodpeckers from Space" (1989 Video "House" Kids 7" Version) by Lex van Coeverden
21. "Woodpeckers from Space" (1989 Video "House" Kids 12" Version) by Lex van Coeverden
22. "Woodpeckers from Space" (1994 Radio Version) by Patrick de Schrevel
23. "Woodpeckers from Space" (1994 Extended Mix) by Patrick de Schrevel
24. "Woodpeckers from Space" (1994 Club Mix Short) by Patrick de Schrevel
25. "Woodpeckers from Space" (1994 Club Mix Long) by Patrick de Schrevel
26. "Woodpeckers from Space" (1994 Robin Drost Version) by Robin Drost
27. "Woodpeckers from Space" (2001 7" Version) by Lex van Coeverden
28. "Woodpeckers from Space" (2001 12" Version) by Lex van Coeverden
29. "(silence)"
30. "(samples)"

== Personnel ==
=== Musicians ===
- Aart Mol – bass guitar
- Cees Bergman – lead vocals, backing vocals
- Anita Crooks – backing vocals
- Sylvia Crooks – lead vocals, backing vocals
- Elmer Veerhoff – keyboard, synthesizer
- Erwin van Prehn – guitar
- Geertjan Hessing – lead vocals, backing vocals, drums

=== Technical ===
- Aart Mol – producer, writer, remixer (as "Adams & Fleisner" and "T. Acardi")
- Cees Bergman – producer, writer, remixer (as "Adams & Fleisner" and "T. Acardi")
- Elmer Veerhoff – producer, writer, remixer (as "Adams & Fleisner" and "T. Acardi")
- Erwin van Prehn – producer, writer, remixer (as "Adams & Fleisner" and "T. Acardi")
- Geertjan Hessing – producer, writer, remixer (as "Adams & Fleisner" and "T. Acardi")
- Kees Grijpink – mastering and lacquer cutting (Dureco Studio, as "C" and "K.G.")
- Daniel Maslovsky – producer, researcher (2014, 2024 reissues)
- Eugeny Gapeev – mastering (2014, 2024 reissues)
- Max Kondrashow – producer, researcher, remastering (2024 reissue, as "Max Goldfinger")
- Kirill Taltaev – producer (2024 reissue)

=== Artwork ===
- Dirk Arend – cover illustration, creator of Tico Tac (original release, 2024 reissue, as "Fruut")
- Bjørn Frank Jensen – comic artist, creator of Tico Tac (2014, 2024 reissues)
- Daniel Maslovsky – artwork, restoration, design (2014, 2024 reissues)
- Max Kondrashow – restoration (2024 reissue)
