= Catapult (band) =

Dutch glam rock band

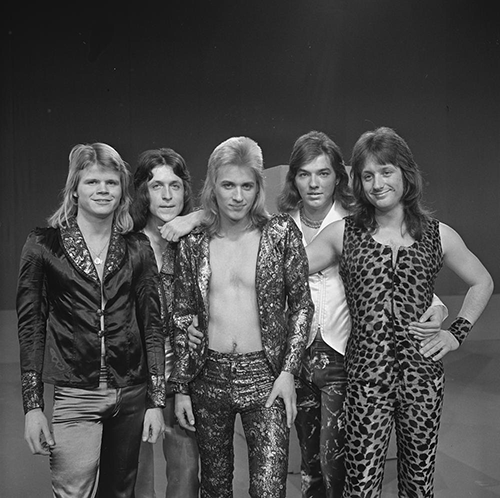
- Catapult in Toppop 1974.

Background information
- Origin: Netherlands
- Genres: Glam rock
- Years active: 1973–1979
- Labels: Polydor, Cat Music
- Past members: Aart Mol; Geertjan Hessing; Erwin van Prehn (died 2018); Cees Bergman (died 2017); Mike Eschauzier; Elmer Veerhoff

Catapult were a Dutch glam rock band active between 1973 and 1979. The band was formed by and consisted of Aart Mol (born 31 January 1953), Cees Bergman (22 April 1952 – 21 September 2017), Erwin van Prehn (1950–2018) and Geertjan Hessing (born 5 July 1951), and later joined by Elmer Veerhoff (born 19 August 1954).

== History ==
=== Music career ===
In 1967, Aart Mol met Geertjan Hessing at his home in the Warmonderweg in Oegstgeest, Leiden, who wanted to play the drums and also knew a singer, Theo van Es. The three were joined by guitarist Erwin van Prehn, and formed the rock band Axis Purple, which, according to Hessing, "motivated [them] to become professionals". They performed at venues including Leyton, Het Volkshuis and Zaal Mekel. After Axis Purple ended, the members met ex-Golden Earring drummer Jaap Eggermont, and performed as Chamberlain in the 1970s. In June 1973, during a holiday in the Spanish resort of Lloret de Mar, Hessing, Van Prehn, Mol and Cees Bergman decided to form a band. As with the former three, Bergman was a veteran of the Leiden/Katwijk rock scene, but their previous other groups, such as Axis Purple (Leiden) and Oriental Garden (Katwijk), had achieved little success up to that time. During their stay, they drew up plans for their band and started taking their work seriously. Various holiday girlfriends, having heard of their plans, gave them many words of encouragement. Upon returning home, they immediately quit jobs and dropped out of school to concentrate on their work. The band was advised by Eggermont to start playing glam rock, a popular genre of music at the time. Assisted by their manager Aad van Delft, the band chose 1 September 1973 as their official starting date. Later that month, keyboard player Michael Eschauzier joined them. The band's name was suggested by Golden Earring vocalist Barry Hay. The band's logo was designed by Wim T. Schippers. In an episode of Toppop Yeah, Bergman revealed the amount of effort it took to get his long bleached haircut for the band.

On 23 November 1973, the band played their first gig supporting Golden Earring in the Maassluis Sport Hall. After that, they worked on their first single, "Hit The Big Time", produced by Eggermont and recorded at Phonogram Studio in Hilversum in December 1973. The single was a raunchy, catchy and energetic song about their stay in Spain. Released in February 1974, it reached No. 16 on the Dutch Singles Chart. In April 1974, Eschauzier was replaced by Elmer Veerhoff. The band had an album and several hit singles between 1974 and 1975, the most successful being "Let Your Hair Hang Down", which reached No. 5 on the Dutch Singles Chart; "Teeny Bopper Band", "Seven Eleven", and "The Stealer". When glam rock started to decline in popularity in the mid-1970s, the band's singles sold less. Their last single, "Here We Go", peaked No. 22 on the Dutch Singles Chart. On 23 December 1979, Catapult gave their farewell gig in the "Feest Paleis" in Beervelde.

=== After Catapult ===
As their popularity began to fade, the band decided that it was time for something different. They wanted to make music in different styles, which was difficult because of their Leiden dialect and Dutch radio stations and television channels' refusal to accept the quintet's ability to do so. With advice from DJ Willem van Kooten, they started writing and producing music for other artists, including Lia Velasco, Patricia Paay, Liberation of Man, The Internationals, The Surfers, Rita Hovink, and Snoopy. The records were produced by Eggermont and financed by Van Kooten. Van Kooten played the music in his own daily program on Hilversum 3, and at the same time received part of the royalties. Around that time, they were all living together and recording music in an Arendshorst apartment in Merenwijk, but the neighbours were constantly complaining about the noise.

Many years later, Mol, Hessing and Van Prehn played in other bands like rock band Bazooka Joe (1994–2020), The Pub Band, and The Quartles, and produced songs for the BNN series Van God Los. On 24 June 2016, Bergman played a "tribute to Catapult" with his band Van Beukenstein at Haringrock in Katwijk aan Zee. On 5 May 2017, they performed at the Bevrijdingsfestival on the Rijnplein. Following Van Prehn's death in 2018, Mol and Hessing currently perform in the acoustic cover band Bacousta.

=== Cat Music ===
In 1977, the members went to Hazerswoude-Rijndijk and formed a recording studio and production company named Cat Music, where they formed Rubberen Robbie, their vehicle for parody and carnival songs, sung in their native Dutch language. They also recorded as The Monotones, scoring a hit in Germany and the Netherlands with the song "Mono" on 15 December 1979. In the 1980s, they formed a new studio in Rijnsaterwoude, where they wrote songs for André Hazes (three of which were recorded for his album Gewoon André) and Leidsche rock band Tower, and specialised in breakdance, hip hop and Italo disco music. They entered a compact disc store owned by Gert van den Bosch, where they listened to illegal records of Italian dance projects and Hi-NRG artists such as Patrick Cowley, Bobby Orlando, Giorgio Moroder and Divine. Inspired by this, they took the records to their studio and used electronic instruments, such as ARP and Moog synthesizers, the Roland TR-808 and the Akai S612, to make "legal" sound-alikes of them. Their new songs were rejected and did not hit the airwaves, so the members used pseudonyms such as "Adams & Fleisner" and "Tony Acardi", forming various fictional bands and artists in which the members were models and dancers hired for cover photograph shoots, and lip-synced to songs sung by Bergman, Hessing and session singers in live performances. These included disco group Fantastique, synth-pop groups Gazuzu and Polysix, electronic trio Digital Emotion, breakbeat group Master Genius, X-Ray Connection, Dr. Groove, Blanc De Blanc, Euro disco group Video Kids, Joanne Daniëls, hip hop groups Comfort & Joy and Party Freaks, and Eurobeat quartet Twiggy Bop. They also released sound effect compilation records, co-wrote and co-produced "Talkin 'Bout Rambo" by Linda Snoeij (under the stage name "L-Vira"), and produced two albums for hard rock band Picture: Every Story Needs Another Picture and Marathon. Many of their dance and Italo disco records were released by Dutch labels such as Dureco Benelux and Boni Records (through their sublabel Break Records), founded by and named after Van den Bosch and Jan van Nieuwkoop in 1982. In 1986, Van den Bosch started making expensive record productions using the money that Cat Music owed him. In the end, Boni Records went bankrupt and Cat Music lost tons of income. It almost cost the members the studio, but they would recover with other projects.

In 1990, Cat Music found it difficult to sell records due to the collapse of the Dutch music industry, so they started producing audiobooks and making ringtones. They also produced the audio comedy series Ome Henk and started writing and producing a lot of records and albums for third parties (including The Smurfs and Telekids), children's DVDs, commercial music, and football songs. In January 2013, Cat Music closed their studio in Rijnsaterwoude and opened as a production company in Voorburg, named Cat Music & More. Cees Bergman moved some of the equipment to a small studio in his house. The company is currently owned by Aart Mol and Geertjan Hessing, with Bergman sharing ownership until his death in 2017.

=== Compilation releases ===
In 1996, Pseudonym released a compilation album of Catapult's singles, The Single Collection. The album also contained three bonus tracks, progressive rock-style "Accident" and "Midsummer Switch", and "White Christmas", which was recorded but went unreleased. In 1999, Rotation released the compilation album Let Your Hair Hang Down, named after Catapult's single of the same name. "Hit The Big Time", "Let Your Hair Hang Down" and "Teeny Bopper Band" were included in the compilation album Cat Nuggets, released by Red Bullet. In 2008, Cat Music released Catapult Complete Collection, Volume 1 and Catapult Complete Collection, Volume 2 on Spotify and Apple Music. In 2020, "Hit The Big Time", "Let It Be True", "Let Your Hair Hang Down", "Performers Prayer", "Teeny Bopper Band", "Nightrake", "Seven Eleven", "Springtime Ballyhoo", "The Stealer", "Back On The Road Again", "Remember September", "See You Back In '86", "Here We Go", "Run For My Wife", "Disco Njet Wodka Da", "Didn't Sleep A Week Last Night", "Spanish Eyes", "The Highways And The By-Ways", "Schoolgirl", "Woman", "Accident", "Midsummer Switch" and "You Better Stay" (from Picture's Every Story Needs Another Picture) were released as part of the compilation album The Golden Years Of Dutch Pop Music by Universal.

=== Personal lives ===
In July 2017, Bergman was diagnosed with pancreatic cancer. He died at the age of 65 in his hometown of Leimuiden two months later on 21 September 2017. Van Prehn (born 1950) would pass away the following year in 2018 at the age of 68. Veerhoff currently works as a computer scientist.

== Discography ==
=== Albums ===
- Catapult (1974)
- Catapult (Grootste hits) (1976)

=== Singles ===
- "Hit The Big Time" (1974)
- "Let Your Hair Hang Down" (1974)
- "Teeny Bopper Band" (1974)
- "The Stealer" (1975)
- "Seven Eleven" (1975)
- "Here We Go" (1976)
- "Remember September" (1976)
- "Disco Njet Wodka Da" (1977)
- "Schoolgirl" (1978)
- "Spanish Eyes" (1978)
