= Nuance (American band) =

Nuance was an American dance music/freestyle group. It was formed by the producer and arranger Ron Dean Miller, and featured Vikki Love on vocals. They charted three hits on the US Billboard Hot Dance Music/Club Play chart in the 1980s, including "Loveride", which hit number 1 in 1985. The same track peaked at number 59 on the UK Singles Chart in January 1985.

== See also ==
- List of number-one dance hits (United States)
- List of artists who reached number one on the US Dance chart
