= Loveride (song) =

Single by Nuance featuring Vikki

from the album Sing, Dance, Rap, Romance
- Released: 1984
- Length: 6:45
- Label: 4th & Broadway (US, UK)
- Songwriter(s): Ron Dean Miller
- Producer(s): Ron Dean Miller

Nuance featuring Vikki singles chronology
"Take A Chance" (1984)	"Loveride" (1984)	"Stop Playing On Me" (1985)

"Loveride" is a 1984 single by the group Nuance, from the group's album Sing, Dance, Rap, Romance. The vocals on the song were performed by Vikki Love.

The song peaked at number one on the Billboard Hot Dance Club Play chart for one week and remained on the chart for sixteen weeks. The single did not crossover to the pop chart, but did peak at number thirty-four on the Hot Black Singles chart.

== Track listing ==
12" Single

- US: 4th & Broadway / BWAY-409

A-Side: Loveride
No.	Title	Length
1.	"Loveride"	6:45

B-Side: Dubride
No.	Title	Length
1.	"Loveride"	7:30

== Chart performance ==
Chart (1985)	Peak position
US "Billboard" Hot Dance/Disco	1
US Billboard Hot Black Singles	34

== Samples ==
- A sample of Vikki Love saying "Ooh..." in the song would later be used on the album version of Nu Shooz' "I Can't Wait", the U.S. version and 12" remix of M|A|R|R|S's "Pump Up the Volume" and Lisette Melendez's "Together Forever."
