= Picture (band) =

Dutch heavy metal band

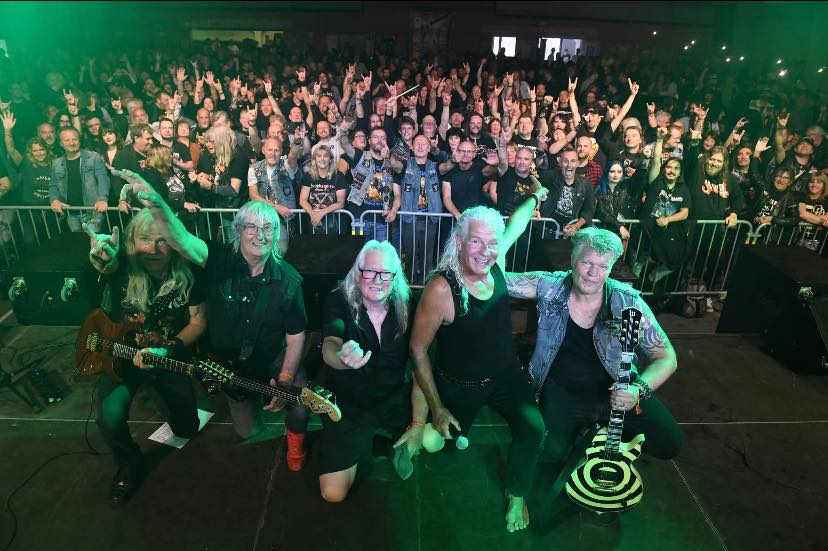
- Picture at South America 2025

Background information
- Origin: Rozenburg, Netherlands
- Genres: Heavy metal; hard rock
- Years active: 1978–1987, 1988, 1995–1999, 2007–present
- Labels: Backdoor, Touchdown, Artist Station
- Members: Peter Strykes; Len Ruygrok; Rinus Vreugdenhil; Laurens Bakker; Appie de Gelder
- Past members: (see below)
- Website: picture-official.com

Picture is one of the first Dutch heavy metal bands. Formed in 1979, they were especially popular in the Netherlands, Germany and Italy for their live performances, and still have a fan base in South America, Mexico and Japan.

Picture supported AC/DC, Ted Nugent and Saxon in the Netherlands. With Saxon, they did a full European tour in 1981. Later on they toured with Rose Tattoo in Germany and headlined tours in Italy and Israel.

== History ==
=== Formation ===
Rinus Vreugdenhil and Laurens Bakker originally got together in 1978 and started jamming with various musicians. It was not until 1979 that the classic lineup of Vreugdenhil, Bakker, Jan Bechtum, and Ronald van Prooijen came together.

=== Early days ===
Picture were originally produced by Cat Music. They worked with manager Henk van Antwerpen and were signed to Warner Bros. Records. However, the band felt the label were trying to steer them in a pop direction and so they left the label to sign with Backdoor Records, a subsidiary of Phonogram Records.

The original line-up recorded their debut album, Picture 1 and their second effort, Heavy Metal Ears in 1980 and 1981 respectively. To begin with, they gigged throughout the Netherlands and Germany. During this time, they started composing their own music. Bechtum would usually come up with the riffs, then the other members would contribute their parts. The songs they wrote during this time would appear on the first album, Picture I.

The band disliked the sound quality of their first two albums. It was not until they recorded Diamond Dreamer that they were happy with the sound quality.

=== Line-up changes ===
However, by this time, Ronald had left for personal reasons and they found Israeli singer Shmoulik Avigal. Not only was the recording done much better, but Shmoulik had a different, and some say, more powerful voice. Many consider Diamond Dreamer as the band's best album.

Recorded at Wisseloord Studios in Hilversum in July and August 1982, and produced by Pete Hinton and Jan Bechtum, the album draws on 1970s hard rock influences such as Deep Purple, Whitesnake and Rainbow, presented in a more modern early 1980s metal framework comparable to Accept, Saxon, Dio and late 1970s Judas Priest. It was ranked 216th among the best albums of 1982 on RateYourMusic, with a user rating of 3.60 out of 5 from 281 ratings. Avigal later went on to record an album with American heavy metal band The Rods after being fired from Picture following a dispute with the band's manager.

After recording and touring with Shmoluik for the Diamond Dreamer album, he suggested they add a second guitarist to fatten their live sound and Chriz Van Jaarsveld was brought in. Though he was a technically proficient guitarist, he did not gel with Bechtum and things went downhill. Then Shmoulik got in a petty argument with their manager and was fired from the band. About this time, Bechtum had had enough and quit for personal reasons. To fill in the gaps, a new singer, Pete Lovell, was recruited along with a second guitarist, Henry van Manen. They went into the studio to record Eternal Dark. This album was slicker than Diamond Dreamer and the two guitarists significantly altered the heavy sound of Jan Bechtum for a more technical groove that sort of worked, but started the trend for the final albums that veered away from the Picture sound. Around this time, Bakker could not take the rigors of touring or the stress of all their management troubles while supporting a wife and twins, so he left.

From that point on, the only remaining original member was Vreugdenhil. He continued for three more albums: Traitor, Marathon, and Every Story Needs Another Picture. Many described them as going into hair metal, with commercial and anonymous songs. Vreugdenhil was particularly disgusted with Every Story Needs Another Picture, as it was an album forced by the record contract, and it is rumored that the whole album was recorded by studio musicians with minimal participation from him.

Though Vreugdenhil continued long after the other original members had left, he was never able to steer the band back into a successful direction. He finally called it a day in 1987, and got a "real" job. The original members tried a brief reunion in 1988.

=== Revival ===
In 2007, the classic lineup reunited for rehearsals. They still had that spark, and planned to cut a CD in 2008 and play some gigs around the Netherlands and Germany. Though Ronald van Prooijen helped out, singer Shmoulik Avigal was asked to participate as well as Pete Lovell, the singer on the Eternal Dark album.

After the smoke cleared in 2008, a permanent lineup was established with Bechtum, Vreugdenhil, Bakker, Rob vanEnkhuizen, and Lovell. They are currently playing throughout Europe to very enthusiastic crowds. A limited edition live album was recorded at various venues and was released by the band. Plans were to release another album in 2009 with new songs, two of which have appeared on the limited edition CD.

The album Old Dogs, New Tricks was released on 1 October 2009, on the MarsMountains label. It contains 12 songs of all new material, released 30 years from when the band first formed.

=== Further line-up changes ===
On 18 December 2009, Bechtum announced his departure from the band. He was replaced by Peter Bourbon. In early 2010, van Enkhuizen decided to leave Picture. His replacement is Gert Nijboer. In 2011, Nijboer was replaced by American Mike Ferguson.

The lineup solidified with the two new guitarists and they began working on their new album which was released in spring 2012. Warhorse, written by all band members, brought Picture back into the limelight. They began touring again. Due to logistical problems, Peter Bourbon had to leave, but that spot was soon filled by another Dutch guitarist, Len Ruygrok. After a few months he decided to leave and former member Andre Wullems came back. The band continues to tour and solidify their reputation in the world of heavy rock and metal.

On 23 March 2016, Pete Lovell announced by Facebook his departure from the band to form his new band Lovell's Blade. Also, Andre Wullems and Mike Ferguson will join the new band. But all the so-far-planned gigs of Picture in 2016 were to be respected and performed by Pete, Andre, Rinus, Laurens and Mike. Nearly a day later, Rinus and Laurens announced that Picture would continue with the original members of the first line-up ever.

In 2017, the band went on a 40th anniversary tour with musicians Jan Bechtum, Ronald van Prooijen, and Appie de Gelder. Later that year, they played in the Sweden Rock Festival for the second time, and shortly thereafter released a live album titled 40 Years: Heavy Metal Ears.

In 2019, a new studio album Wings is released worldwide through Pure Steel Records. It contains ten new songs and is the tenth studio album of the band. In February 2020 has been announced that a new singer, the Italian Phoenix Reborn took Ronald's place.

In 2020, the Corona pandemic limits the future of the band. Shows that will hopefully be done end of 2021 will be done by vocalist and old friend of the band Peter Strykes.

After a considerable period as a substitute guitarist, it appears during the corona pandemic that Jan Bechtum's hand is causing too many problems, even after surgery. Jan Bechtum has to resign from the band but stays musically active, writing new songs and recording at home. This marks the official return of Len Ruygrok as a band member. 9 April 2021 Len Ruygrok will play his first gig at Blast From the Past @ Kuurne (BE) as an official band member.

The new line-up is strong and that will not go unnoticed. The powerful vocals of Peter Strykes and the new (old school) sound of Len Ruygrok ensure that the band is touring again. In the period 2021–2023, the band will visit European countries such as Greece, Belgium, Germany, Denmark, Spain and Poland and 2023 will also end with a 14-day tour through the cities of Sau Paulo, Limeira, Curitiba and Londrina in Brazil.

== Members ==
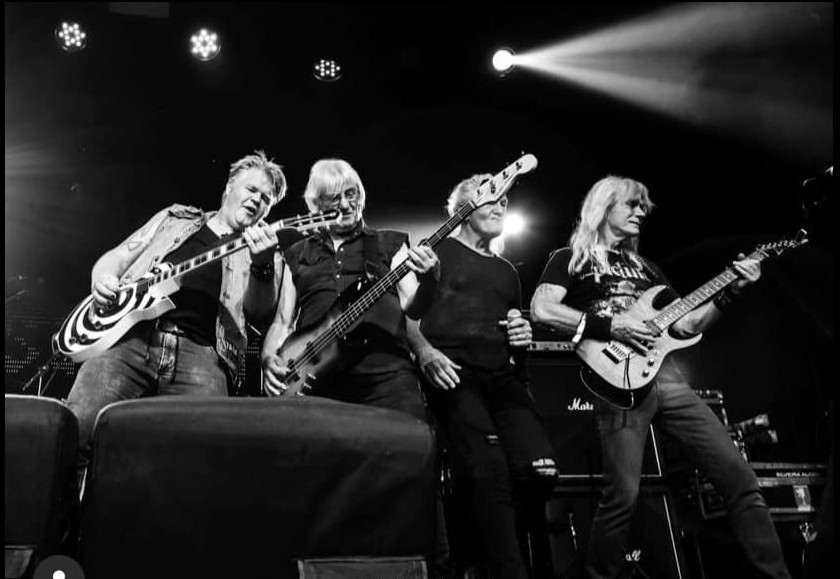
Picture performing

=== Current ===
- Peter Strykes – vocals
- Len Ruygrok – guitars
- Rinus Vreugdenhil – bass
- Laurens Bakker – drums
- Appie de Gelder – guitars

=== Former ===
- Jan Bechtum – guitars
- Rob van Enkhuizen – guitars
- Andre Wullems – guitars
- Ronald van Prooijen – vocals
- Shmoulik Avigal – vocals (died)
- Bert Heerink – vocals
- Michel Zandbergen
- Pete Lovell – vocals
- Phoenix Reborn – vocals
- Chriz Van Jaarsveld – guitars
- Henry van Manen – guitars
- Harry Bruintjes – guitars
- Peter Bourbon – guitars
- Gert Nijboer – guitars
- Ronald de Grauw – keyboards
- Jos Adema – bass
- Mark Maas – drums
- Jacques van Oevelen – drums (died)
- Mike Ferguson – guitars
- Arie van der Graaf – guitars

== Discography ==
=== Albums ===
- Picture 1 (1980)
- Heavy Metal Ears (1981)
- Diamond Dreamer (1982)
- Eternal Dark (1983)
- Traitor (1985)
- Every Story Needs Another Picture (1986)
- Marathon (1987)
- Live 2008 (2008)
- Old Dogs, New Tricks (2009)
- Warhorse (2012)
- Live – 40 Years Heavy Metal Ears 1978–2018 (2018)
- Wings (2019)
- Live in Sao Paulo (2021)

=== Other ===
- '80 Demo (demo, 1980)
- Eternal Dark/Into the Underworld (single, 1983)
- Limited Edition EP (EP, 1985)
- Fantasies/Traitor (single, 1985)
- "We Just Can't Lose" (single, 1987)
