= 3 October Festival =

Festival in Leiden, the Netherlands

3 October Festival 3 Oktober
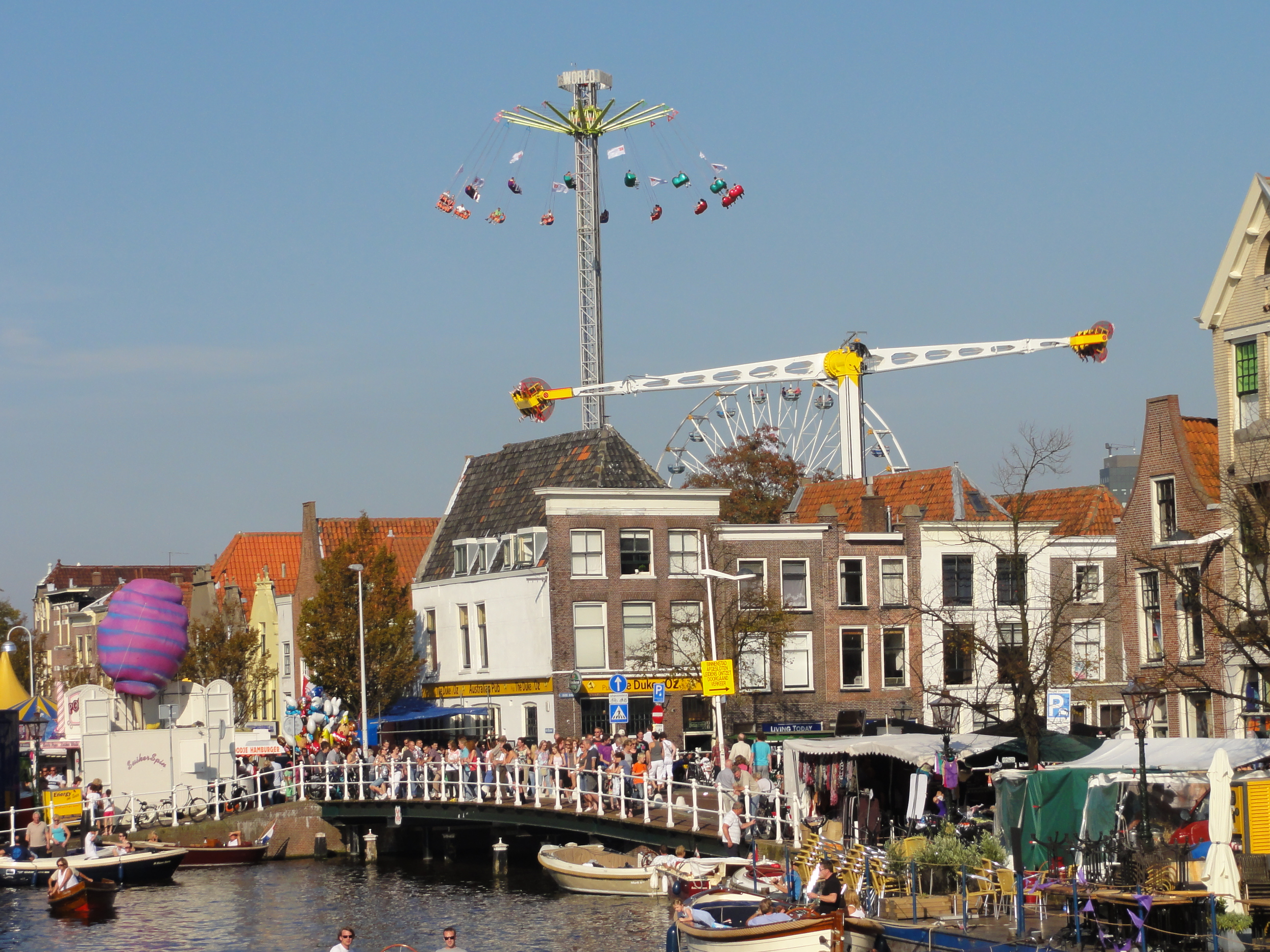
- The 2011 edition of the festival.
- Genre: Festival
- Begins: Various dates
- Ends: 3 or 4 October
- Frequency: Annually
- Locations: Leiden, Netherlands
- Inaugurated: Observed beginning 1575; made a city holiday, 1886
- Website: http://www.3october.nl

The 3 October Festival (Dutch : 3 Oktoberfeest or simply 3 Oktober, also Leidens Ontzet) is a festival in Leiden, the Netherlands. It is held annually during the days leading up to the 3rd and often concludes that evening or the following day. Observed since the 1500s, its modern public celebration has been a locally declared holiday since 1886.

== Historical origins ==
The festival commemorates the anniversary of the 1573–1574 Siege of Leiden during the Eighty Years' War when the Spanish Army attempted to capture the city. The first siege lasted from October 1573 until March 1574, and the Spanish returned that May for a second attempt. The city had neglected, in the interim, to destroy Spanish fortifications outside of the city's protective walls and failed to acquire enough additional provisions to sustain a renewed siege, even though they were warned in advance of the Spanish forces' return.

Food supplies within Leiden were almost completely exhausted as the Spanish attempted to infiltrate the city. To improve morale in the city, then-mayor Pieter Adriaanszoon van der Werff proposed committing suicide so his constituents could eat his own body. That September, the army of Dutch rebel leader William the Silent began formulating a plan to liberate the city.

They began destroying dikes near Rotterdam in order to flood the surrounding countryside. However, it took several days before there was enough wind to direct the water over the land toward Leiden. A fierce storm aided their efforts on the night of 2 October. The rising tide caused a portion of Leiden's city walls to begin crumbling. That, coupled by the rising water level in their camps, convinced the Spanish troops that an attack was underway and they fled in terror. By that time, hundreds of people within the city had perished due to starvation. According to legend, a boy, usually named as Cornelis Joppenszoon, left the city that night to explore the Spanish troop's destroyed camps. He found a pot of stew made of carrots, onions, parsnips, and meat, still warm and undamaged by the water. He then returned to the city and informed everyone that the troops had fled.

William and his soldiers sailed to Leiden as part of a makeshift military fleet dubbed the Watergeuzen ("Sea Beggars") on the morning of 3 October. They headed north along the Vliet canal, which now had water deep enough to support their boats, and brought food and other supplies to Leiden's citizens. The food supplies primarily consisted of herring and white bread (haring en wittebrood). To reward the city's citizens for withstanding the Spanish attack, William established Leiden University the following year.

== Events ==
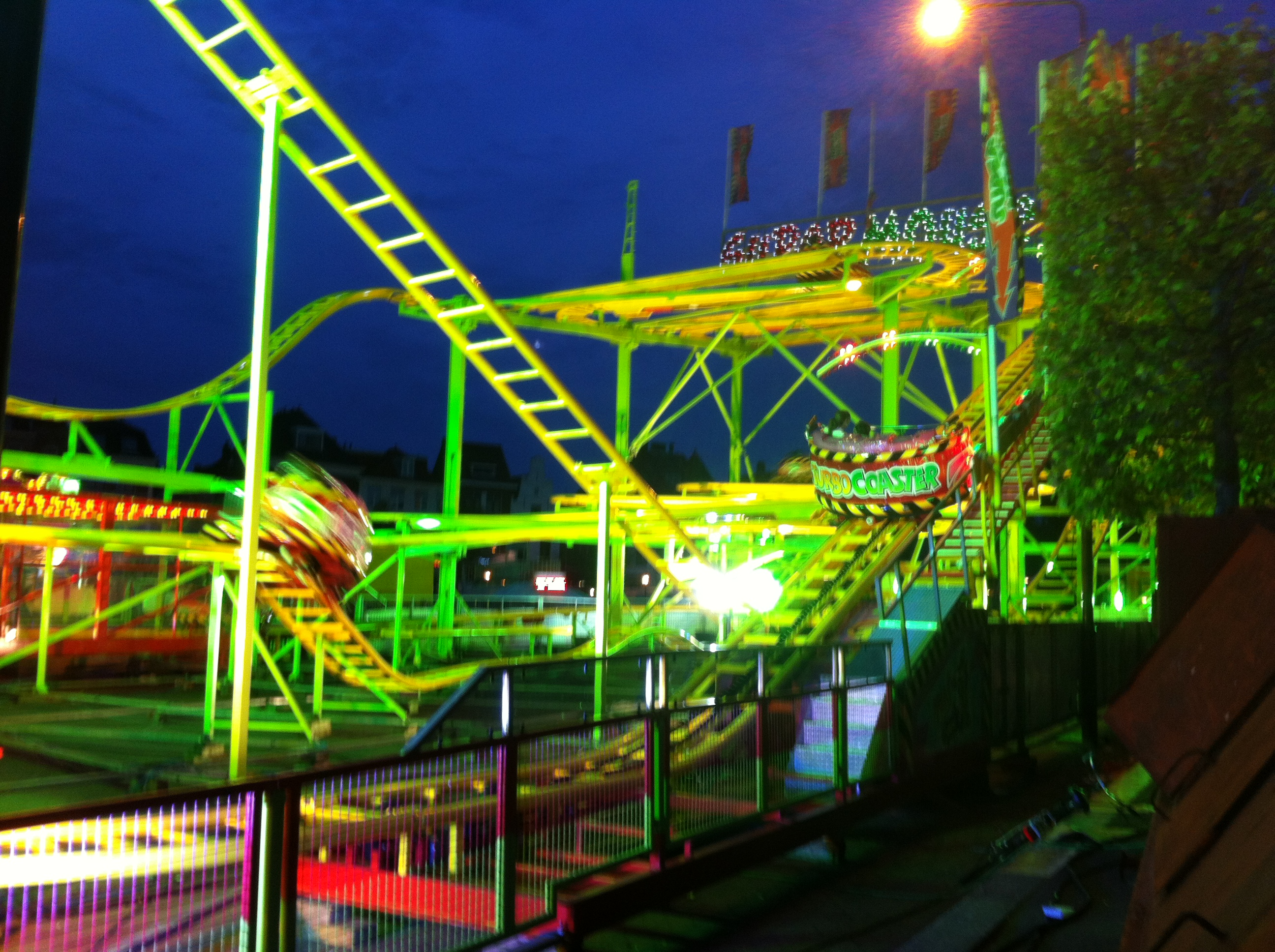
The festival features a carnival with rides including roller coasters.

In honor of the liberation of Leiden on 3 October 1574, the day itself was declared an official city holiday in 1886. It is now celebrated with a variety of activities and events that take place in the days leading up to 3 October.

Many of the city's residents take 3 October itself off from work or school to either participate in or enjoy the festivities. Typical traditions include: an evening parade on the night of 2 October, a carnival and market in the center of the city, various theatrical performances and historical reenactments, and a memorial service in St. Peter's Church (Pieterskerk) that commemorates the traumatic events of the siege. A second parade takes place on the afternoon of 3 October with a firework display later that evening.

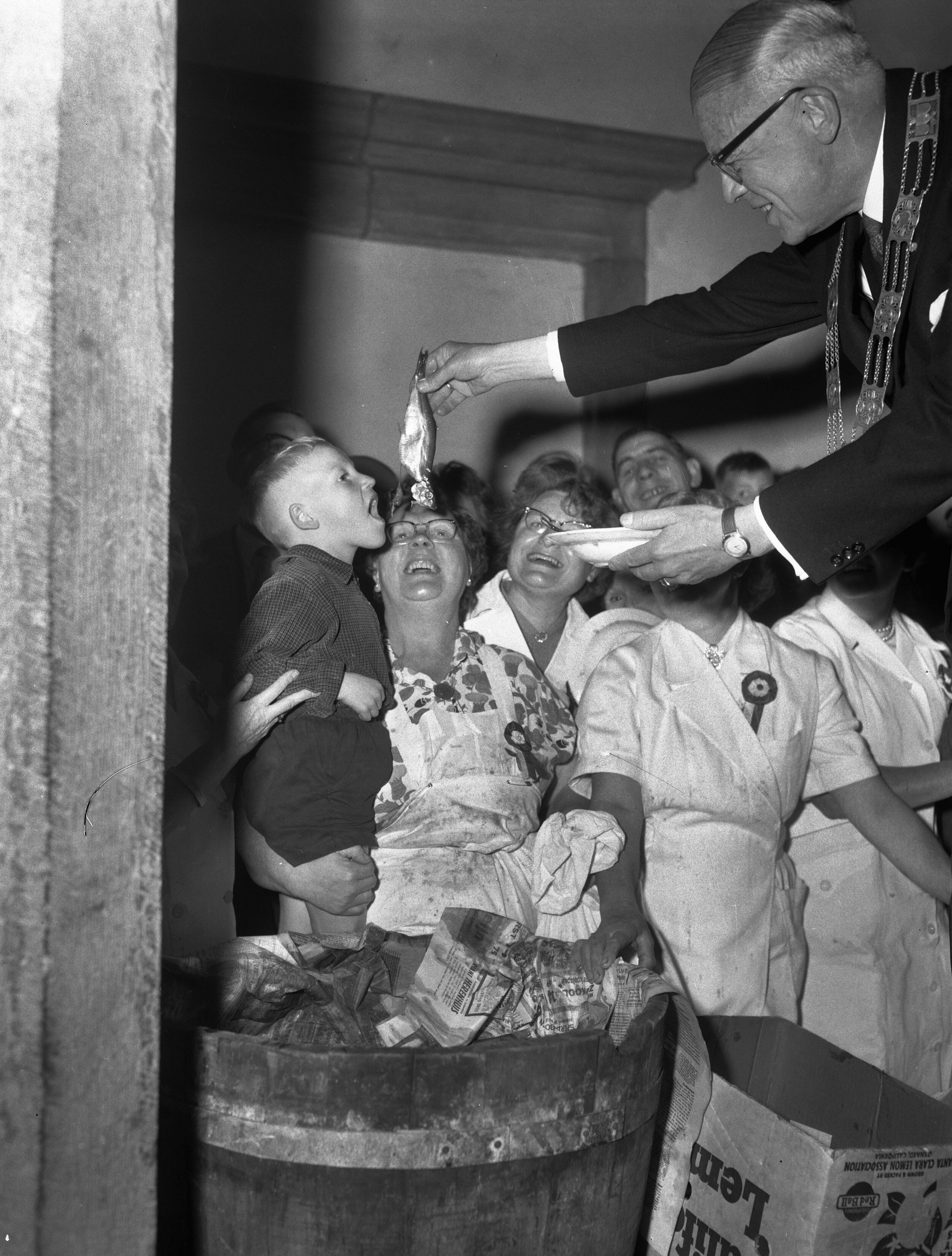
The mayor in 1960, handing out herring to children

The traditional meal associated with the festival is herring and white bread (haring en wittebrood). Cleaned herring along with a small loaf of white bread are handed out to city residents for free at the Weigh House (De Waag) at dawn on the morning of 3 October, but prior registration and tickets are required. On the evening of 2 October, hutspot (a dish representative of the stew found in the Spanish troops' camp) is served at an event located on the Hooglandsekerkgracht, a street in the center of the city. Leiden-based band Rubberen Robbie's song "Drie Oktober" also commemorates the festival, and its lyrics refer to herring, hutspot, drinking, and partying.

In June 2019, the festival was officially added to the Netherlands' National Heritage List. To help combat the large amount of litter created by festival attendees and prevent disposable cups from falling into the canals, organizers switched to cups with deposits that year as well. An estimated 98.2 per cent of these cups were returned to bars. The 2020 edition of the festival largely consisted of remote events including a 3 October Ontzettend Live! internet broadcast due to the COVID-19 crisis.

== Controversies ==
In recent years, 3 October has drawn criticism from local residents and business owners, some of whom opt to leave Leiden during the festival due to noise, public drunkenness, and other concerns. In 2019, eight neighborhood associations in the city's center firmly opposed an extension of its hours of operation. Several businesses and hotels close altogether or discourage tourists from visiting the city while the festival is underway.

Bar and cafe owners have also protested the high fees associated with hosting food carts, outdoor beer taps, and restrooms while expressing concerns over attendees who bring their own alcohol with them from home.
