= Café Society (South African band) =

South African music group

- Origin: South Africa
- Genres: Hi-NRG
- Years active: 1984 – 1986
- Labels: Passion Music; ZYX Records; Unidisc; Injection Disco Dance Label; Principle Records
- Members: Costa Anadiotis; Julia Jade Aston; Anneline Malebo; Lolly Peterson; Penny Lane; George Vardas; Peps Cotummaccio; Tony Otto Gavin Langeveldt

Café Society was a South African group from the 1980s best known for their two cover songs "Somebody to Love" and "Woodpeckers from Space".

== Early years ==
The band was formed in Johannesburg in 1984. Café Society consisted of various artists singing cover versions and original songs under the watchful eye of multi-instrumentalist and producer Costa Anadiotis. Costa Anadiotis was also the synthesizer player in the disco-rock South African group Buffalo with Peter Vee during the late 1970s as well as the group Fantasy.

== "Somebody to Love" ==
The first song to be produced was a cover of Jefferson Airplane's "Somebody to Love" in 1984, using the vocals of Julia Jade Aston. Aston was also a member of Working Girls, Face To Face and Wizard with Rob Russell Davies. The song was received well internationally because of its Hi-NRG-driven bassline popular at the time.

== "Relight My Fire" ==
Next up was the Dan Hartman song "Relight My Fire", which utilized the vocals of Lolly Peterson and Anneline Malebo. Malebo was the singer in the Patrick van Blerk outfit Joy, who had an international hit with "Paradise Road" in 1980. Sadly, Anneline Malebo died of Aids-related complications in 2002. The song received a mediocre response and featured on some compilation albums, including South African High-Energy Double Dance Vol.3.

== "Woodpeckers from Space" and the album ==
Then in 1985 when the VideoKids refused to release their song "Woodpeckers From Space" in South Africa due to the political situation in the country at that time, Costa Anadiotis decided to release his own version of the song under the banner of Café Society. "Woodpeckers from Space" was a Number 1 hit in South Africa in July 1985 and stayed on the Top 20 for 19 weeks, of which 8 were at the Number 1 position. The album Relight My Fire was released in 1985 but could not help this mainly studio outfit to reach a higher level and soon everybody went their separate ways.

== Albums ==
=== Relight My Fire – 1985 ===
Side 1

1. "Relight My Fire"
2. "Take Me"
3. "I'm on the Loose"

Side 2

1. "Woodpeckers from Space"
2. "Somebody to Love"
3. "Night Rider"
4. "So-o-much in Love"
