= Rubberen Robbie =

Dutch band

Rubberen Robbie is a Dutch band (or "comedy act") from Leiden, Netherlands, best known for a parodic medley of Dutch-language songs that was a number-one hit in the Netherlands in 1981. It is the continuation of a successful 1970s glam rock outfit, Catapult; its members also formed a successful production and songwriting team, Cat Music, responsible for a number of Dutch hit songs.

== History ==
The band was formed by various ex-members of a rock combo called Catapult, which split up in the early 1980s. Catapult had scored a number of hits in the late 1970s playing a form of glam rock; "Let your hair hang down" and "Teeny Bopper Band" were two of the band's hits. After their popularity faded, the band split up and its members formed a production company, Cat Music, specializing in producing various bands (including hard rock act Picture) and occasional one-hit wonders. They became quite adept at songwriting; Andre Hazes recorded three of their songs for his album Gewoon André, including the number-one hit "Een Beetje Verliefd". The members did form a number of other bands, one of which, The Monotones, had a hit in Germany and the Netherlands with the song "Mono". Rubberen Robbie was their vehicle for parody and carnival songs.

One of the band's most popular songs, "De Nederlandse Sterre Die Strale Overal" ("Dutch Stars Shine Everywhere"), was a medley of verses adapted and butchered from Dutch hit songs; the very idea of such a compilation parodied a slew of hits by the Dutch novelty pop act Stars on 45; it sold 60,000 copies in three weeks and earned the band number one status on the Dutch charts. The band is hailed as one of the best acts from Leiden; their song "3 Oktoberrr" is a perennial favorite at the Leids 3 October Festival (the triple r in the song title is a reference to the Leiden dialect, with its peculiar pronunciation of that phoneme). Almost thirty years later the song was still ranked 62 in the top 500 songs of Omroep West, the regional radio station. Other well-known songs by the band include a parody of the Dutch classic levenslied "Zuiderzeeballade", and the song "Marie" (about a guy complaining that his girlfriend left him, even though he didn't cheat on her more than once a week), which is cited as an example of what the Leiden dialect sounds like.

The band remains popular as a live act. Since the mid-2000s, singer Cees Bergman plays live concerts with a classic rock band, Van Beukenstein. Maximum Overdrive is a cover band playing Rubberen Robbie songs.

== Members ==
- Aart Mol (bass guitar, vocals)
- Cees Bergman (vocals)
- Elmer Veerhoff (keyboard)
- Erwin van Prehn (guitar)
- Geertjan Hessing (drums)
