= Snoopy (band) =

Dutch disco band

- Genres: Pop, disco
- Years active: 1978 – 1980
- Members: Ethel Mezas; Florence Woerdings; Maureen Seedorf

Snoopy was a Dutch female disco duo. The group was founded by music manager Han Meijer in 1978 with singers Ethel Mezas (1956-2023) and Florence Woerdings (born 1956). Woerdings left the project in 1979 and was replaced with Maureen Seedorf. The group ceased activities in 1980.

In 1978–1979 they had a hit with "No Time for a Tango". The song was written and produced by Meijer, Catapult musicians Aart Mol, Cees Bergman, Elmer Veerhoff, Erwin van Prehn and Geertjan Hessing, and Jaap Eggermont's wife Lucia Flint. It reached number 7 in Germany, number 9 in Austria, and number 10 in Switzerland.

== Members ==
- Ethel Mezas (born 1955 in Paramaribo, Suriname, died 2023 in Harderwijk, Netherlands) — vocals
- Florence Woerdings (born 1956) — vocals (until 1979)
- Maureen Seedorf — vocals (1979-1980)

== Discography ==
=== Albums ===
- 1980: Snoopy

=== Singles ===
| Year | Single | Peak chart positions | | | | |
| Year | Single | AUT | BE | GER | NL | SWI |
|---|---|---|---|---|---|---|
| 1978 | "No Time for a Tango" | 19 | 24 | 7 | 17 | 10 |
| 1979 | "Honolulu" | — | — | — | — | — |
| 1979 | "It's All in the Bible" | — | 9 | — | 10 | — |
| 1980 | "Rain, Snow and Ice" | — | 29 | — | 24 | — |
"—" denotes releases that did not chart or were not released
