= Hazerswoude-Rijndijk =

- Village
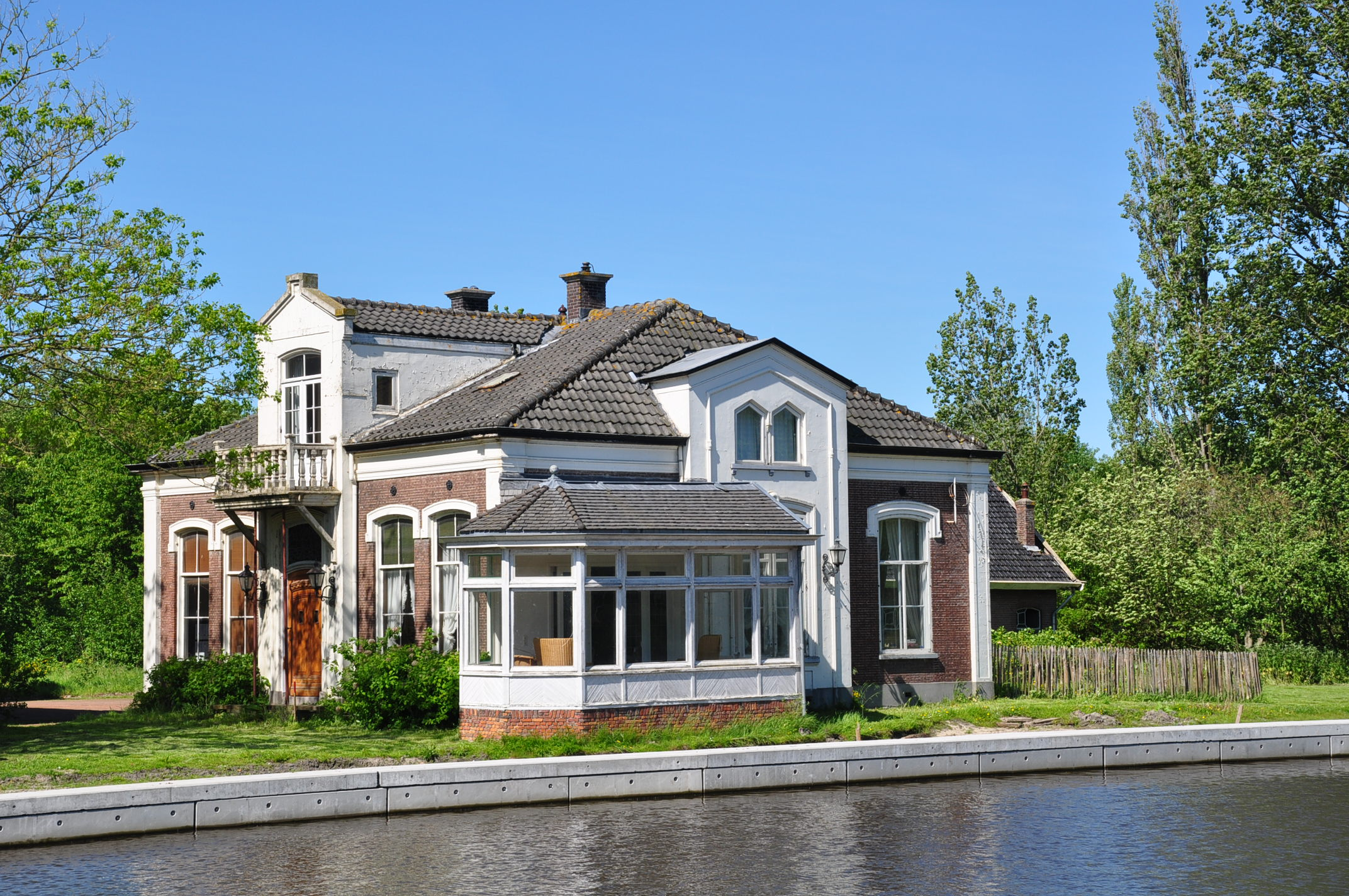
- Nieuw Werklust, Rijksmonument number 514727

- Location in the province of South Holland in the Netherlands Location in the Netherlands
- Coordinates: 52°7′45″N 4°35′35″E
- Country: Netherlands
- Province: South Holland
- Municipality: Alphen aan den Rijn

Area
  - Total: 5.72 km^{2} (2.21 sq mi)
- Elevation: −0.3 m (−0.98 ft)

Population (2021)
  - Total: 5,440
  - Density: 951/km^{2} (2,460/sq mi)
- Time zone: UTC+1 (CET)
  - Summer (DST): UTC+2 (CEST)
- Postal code: 2394
- Dialing code: 071

Hazerswoude-Rijndijk is a Dutch village located in the province of South Holland. It is a part of the municipality of Alphen aan den Rijn, and lies about 5 km west of the village center.

Hazerswoude-Rijndijk is a peat excavation settlement which developed in the Middle Ages south of the Oude Rijn.

The Catholic St Bernardus Church is a single aisled church built between 1854 and 1855. The polder mill Groenendijkse Molen was built in 1627 as a wooden windmill. It was considered for replacement by a stone windmill several times. An electric pumping station was installed in 1959. In 1966, the windmill was bought by a foundation and restored to working order. It operates on a voluntary basis.

== Gallery ==
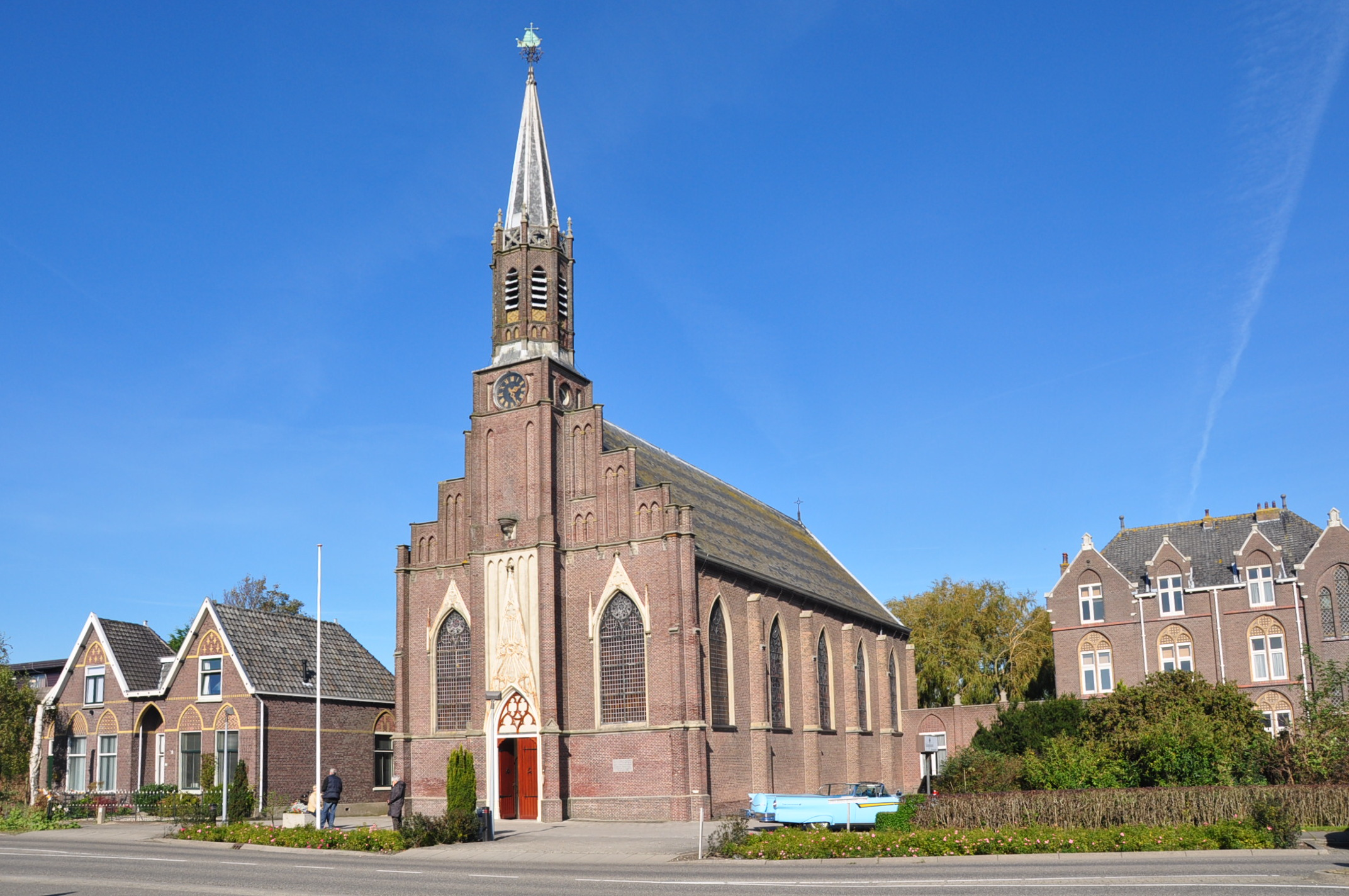
St Bernardus Church

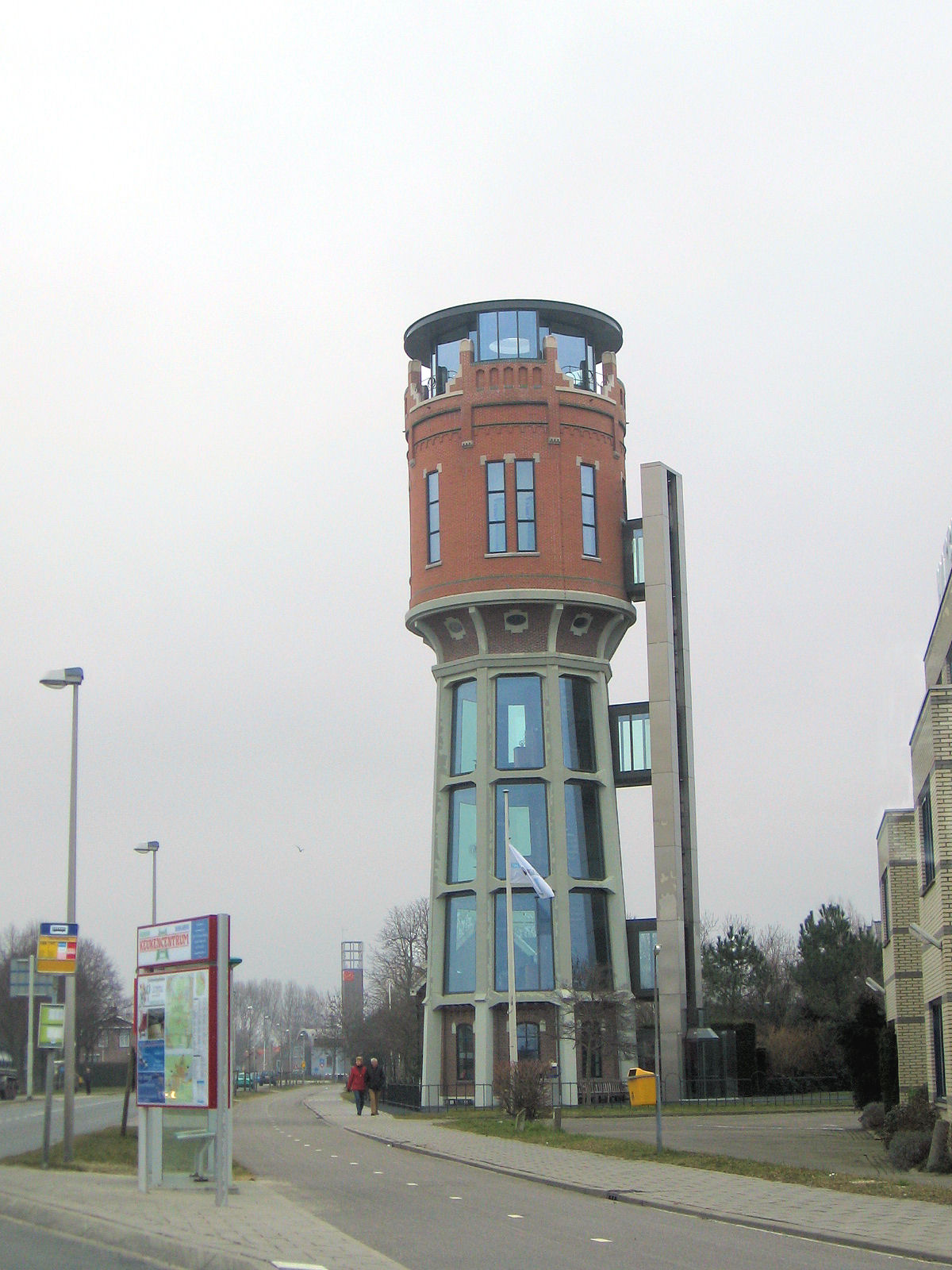
Water tower

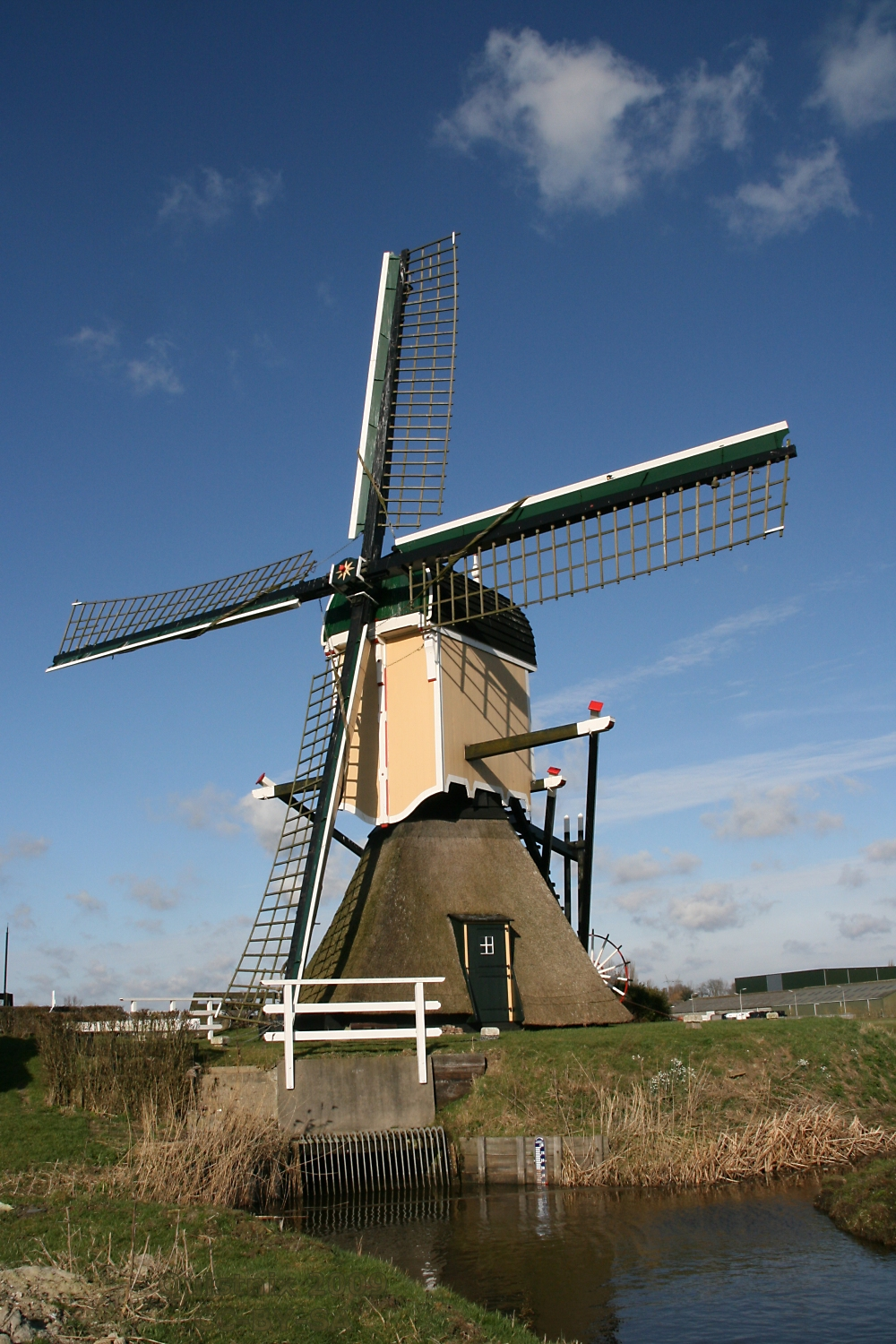
Polder mill Groenendijkse Molen

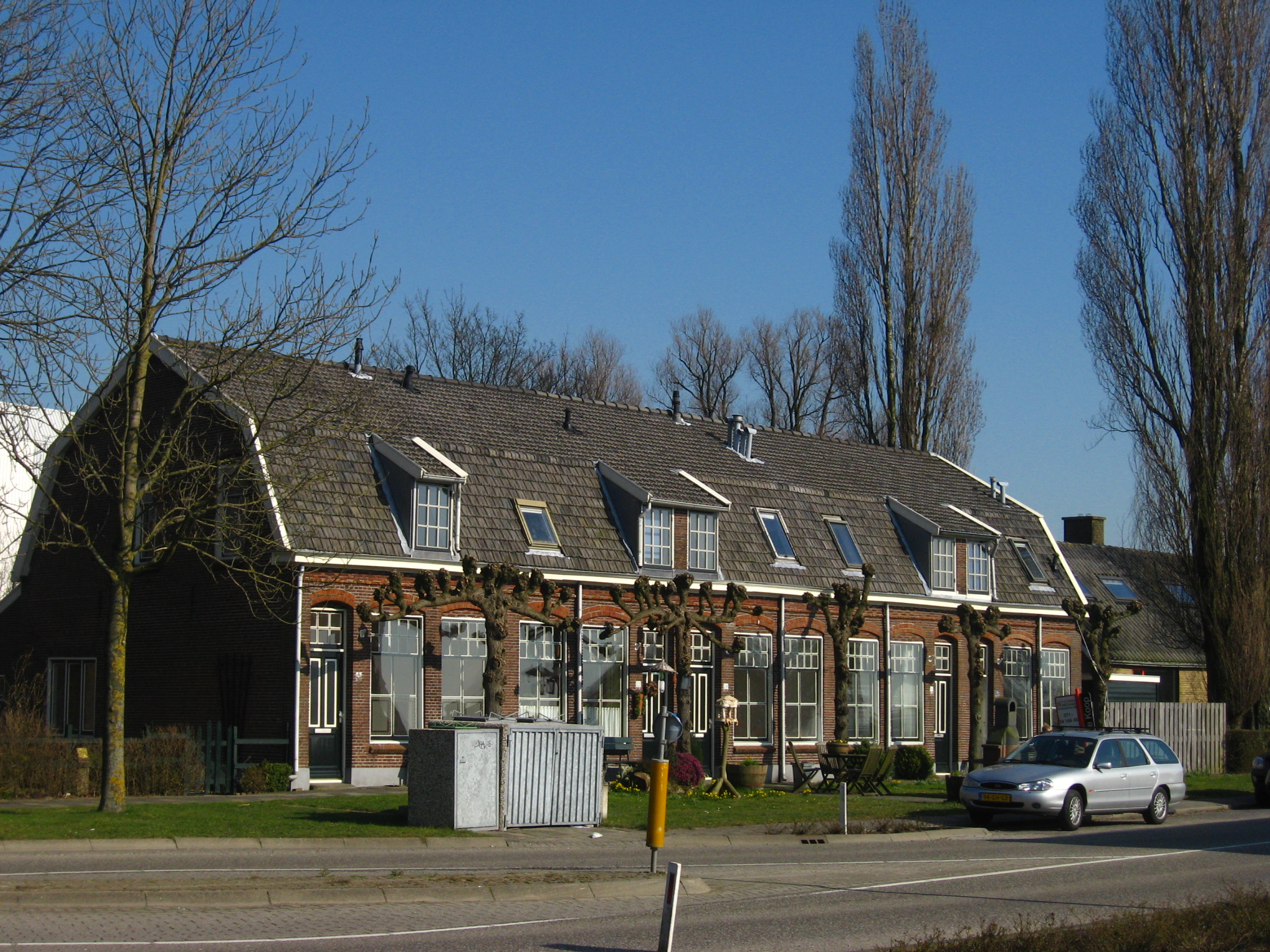
Houses in Hazerswoude-Rijndijk
