= Willem van Kooten =

Dutch disc jockey and businessman (1941–2025)

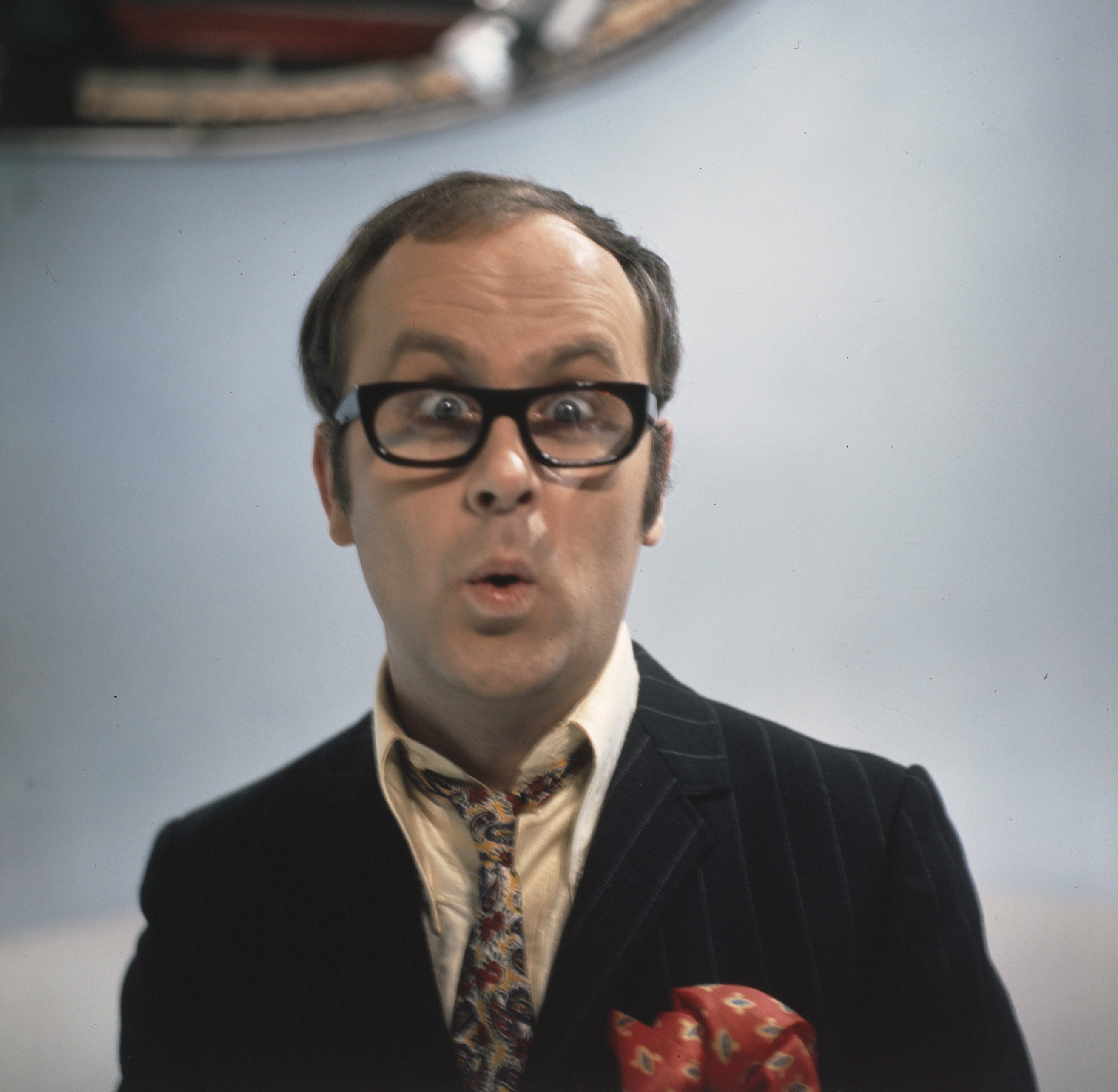
van Kooten in 1968

Willem van Kooten (Dutch pronunciation: [ˈʋɪləɱ vɑŋ ˈkoːtə(n)]; 7 January 1941 – 3 January 2025) was a Dutch businessman and radio DJ under the name Joost den Draaijer (pronounced [ˈjoːz dɛn ˈdraːiər]). He was born in Hilversum.

== Life and career ==
At the age of 19, Van Kooten joined offshore radio station Radio Veronica in 1960 as a writer of jingles and commercials. Later he became a DJ and program director. He used the pseudonym Joost den Draaijer, which was a pun on playing records ("draaien" is Dutch for "play"; literally his pseudonym means Joost the Player). In 1964 he initiated Veronica's Top 40, the first weekly pop chart in the Netherlands which quickly became Veronica's most listened-to show. The chart was modelled after various American examples, including a printed version of the Top 40 which listeners could pick up for free at their local record shop.

At the end of the 1960s, Van Kooten formed a music publishing company. The recording arm of this company was named Red Bullet (a term for a fast moving record in the Top 40). He signed a number of Dutch acts who he began to promote abroad. One of them was Shocking Blue, whose "Venus" became the first Dutch number one hit in the American charts.

In 1970 he moved from Veronica to Dutch public broadcaster NOS for which he continued to work until 1978. After that he became an investor in media businesses and on the international property market.

== Death ==
On 2 January 2025, the Top 40, which he had masterminded, celebrated its 60th anniversary. A day later, Willem van Kooten died aged 83.

== See also ==
- Van (Dutch)
