= Rijnsaterwoude =

- Village
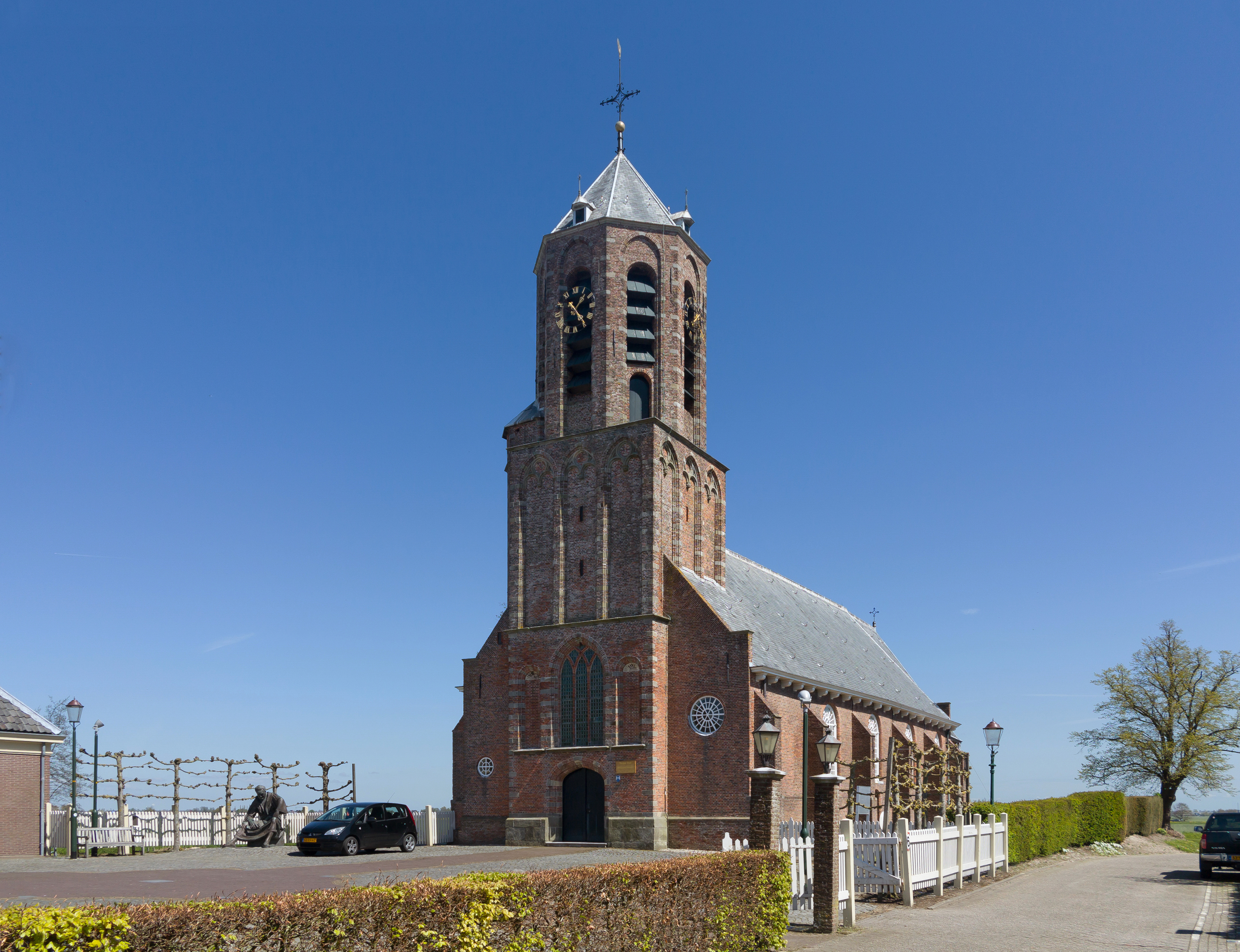
- Church: De Woudse Dom

- Location in the province of South Holland in the Netherlands Location in the Netherlands
- Coordinates: 52°12′N 4°40′E
- Country: Netherlands
- Province: South Holland
- Municipality: Kaag en Braassem

Area
  - Total: 8.78 km^{2} (3.39 sq mi)
- Elevation: −2.0 m (−6.6 ft)

Population (2021)
  - Total: 1,200
  - Density: 140/km^{2} (350/sq mi)
- Time zone: UTC+1 (CET)
  - Summer (DST): UTC+2 (CEST)
- Postal code: 2465
- Dialing code: 0172
- Major roads: N207

Rijnsaterwoude is a village in the Dutch province of South Holland. It is located about 6 km north of the town of Alphen aan den Rijn, in the municipality of Kaag en Braassem.

== History ==
The village was first mentioned in the first half of the 11th century as Rinsaterwalt, and means "forest of people who live along the (Oude) Rijn". Rijnsaterwoude developed as a peat excavation settlement in the Middle Ages along the Braassemermeer.

The Dutch Reformed church Woudse Dom is a single aisled church with a built-in tower. The choir was built around 1500. The nave and tower were rebuilt are being damaged by a storm in 1552. The church was restored between 1956 and 1958. The polder mill De Geestmolen was built in 1707. In 1960, the windmill sail broke and an electro motor was installed. In 1963, it was sold and restored in 1964. The wind mill is occasionally in service.

Rijnsaterwoude was home to 561 people in 1840. It was a separate municipality until 1991, when it became part of Jacobswoude. In 2009, it became part of the municipality of Kaag en Braassem.

== Gallery ==
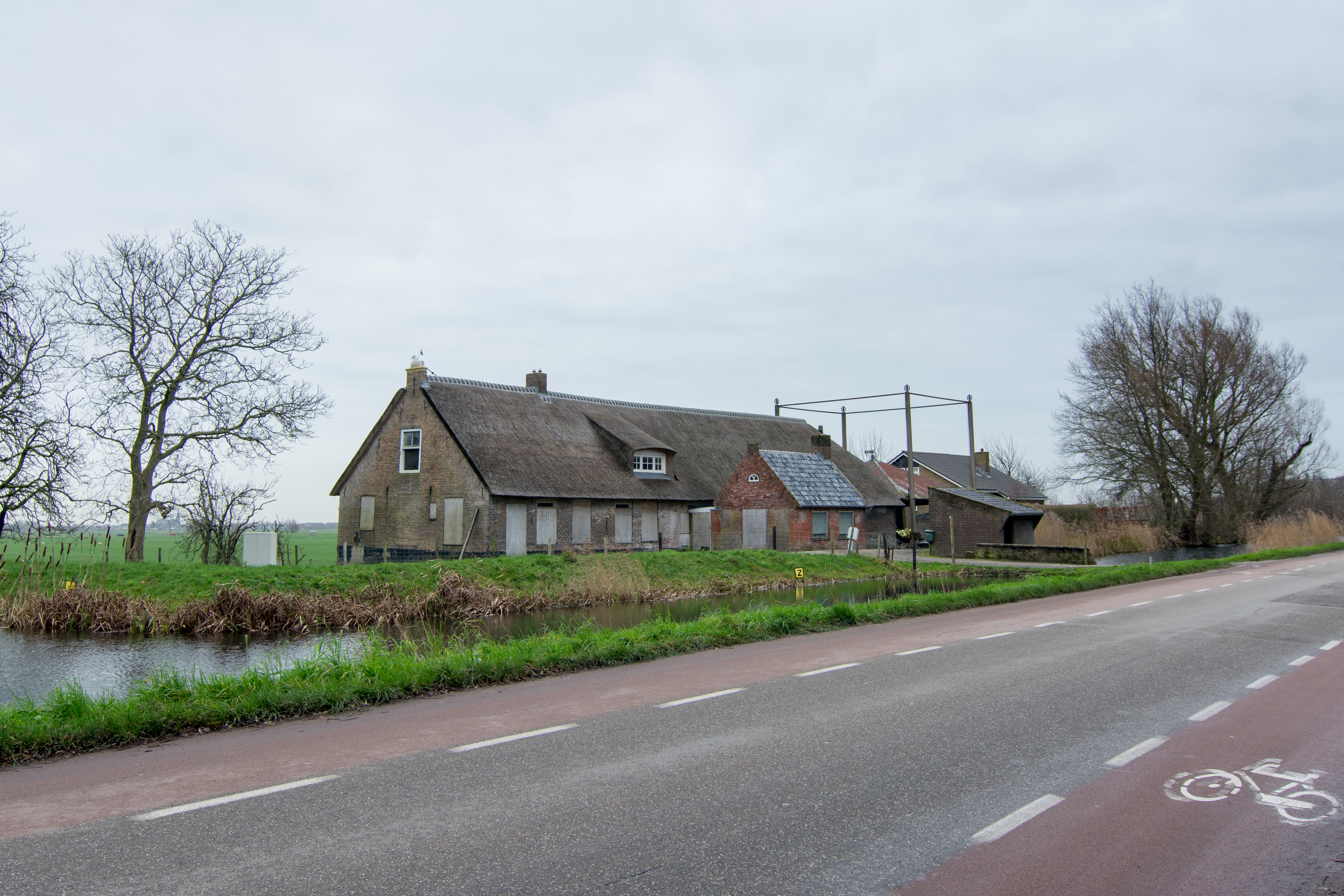
Farm in Rijnsaterwoude

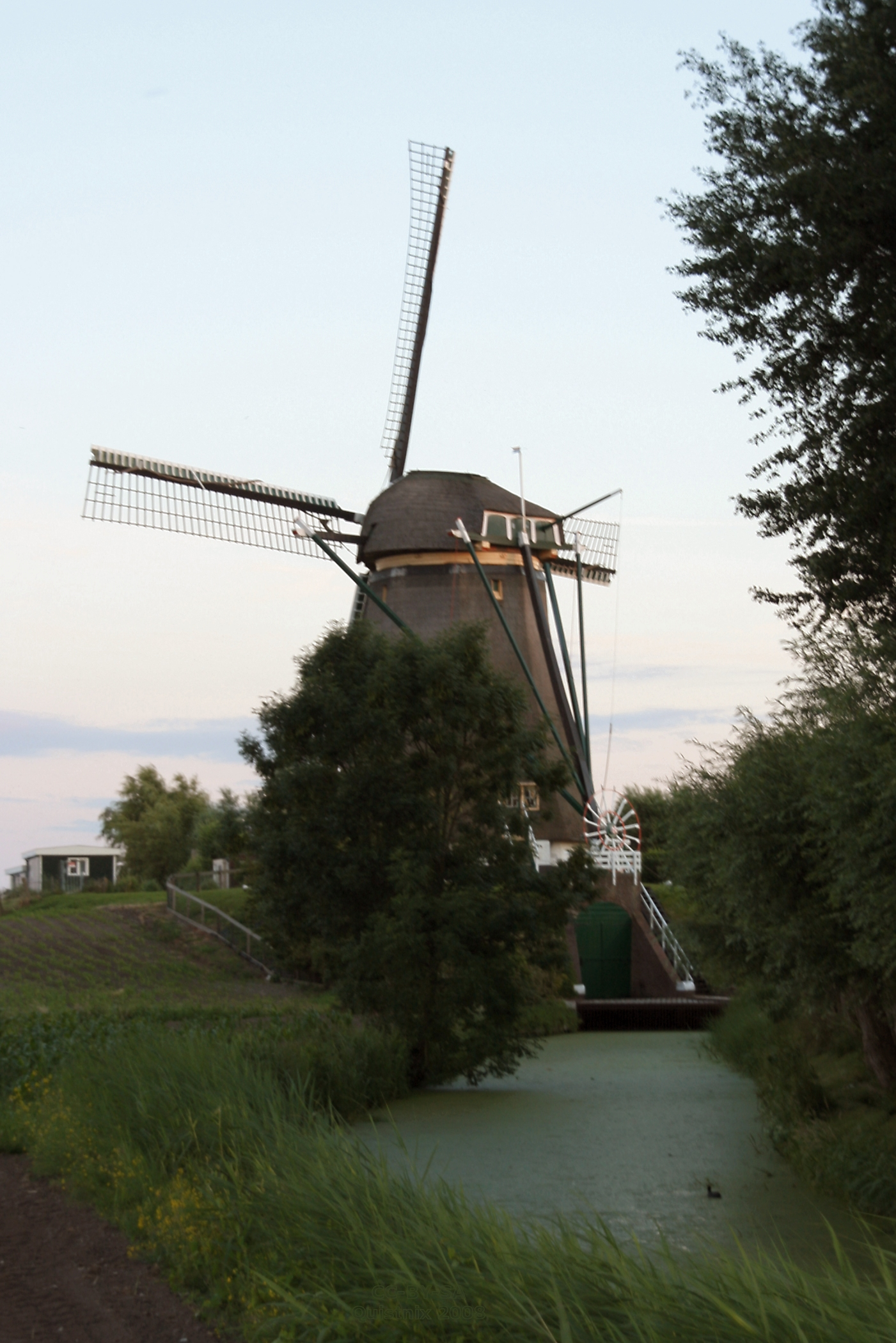
Windmill De Geestmolen
