= Someone's Coming =

1979 song by Steve Harley

Single by Steve Harley

from the album Hobo with a Grin
- B-side: "Riding the Waves (For Virginia Woolf)"
- Released: 1979
- Genre: Pop rock
- Length: 4:36
- Label: EMI Records
- Songwriters: Steve Harley; Jo Partridge
- Producer: Steve Harley

Steve Harley singles chronology
"Roll the Dice" (1978)	"Someone's Coming" (1979)	"Freedom's Prisoner" (1979)

"Someone's Coming" is a song by English singer-songwriter Steve Harley, released in 1979 as the second and final single from his 1978 debut solo studio album, Hobo with a Grin. The song was written by Harley and Jo Partridge, and was produced by Harley.

== Background ==
Harley's debut solo album, Hobo with a Grin, was released in July 1978 but failed to meet commercial expectations. The lead single, "Roll the Dice", was released during the same month and, although it gained radio play, failed to enter the UK Singles Chart. After spending most of the year living in Los Angeles, Harley returned to England at the end of 1978. Around this time, EMI made plans to release "Someone's Coming" as the album's second single. It was originally scheduled for release on 10 November 1978, but this was subsequently pushed back to 23 February 1979. For its release as a single, a remixed version of the song was created. Like its parent album and "Roll the Dice", "Someone's Coming" was a commercial failure, failing to make an appearance in the UK charts.

"Someone's Coming" was recorded at Abbey Road Studios in London. Any remixing or additional recording was done in Los Angeles, and the song was mixed at Sunset Sound Recorders in Hollywood. The song features performances from ex-Cockney Rebel members Duncan Mackay, George Ford and Stuart Elliott, and the backing vocals are provided by Marc Bolan, Gloria Jones and Yvonne Keeley.

Speaking to The Morning Call in September 1978, Harley told Len Righi that the song was one of the oldest on Hobo with a Grin and had originally been written for Steve Harley & Cockney Rebel. He also revealed that his close friend Marc Bolan had performed on the song, along with another track from the album, "Amerika the Brave", during Bolan's final studio session in July 1977 before his death in September 1977. Bolan contributed guitar and backing vocals but was uncredited. Harley commented:

"The last time Marc went in the studio was for 'Amerika the Brave' and 'Someone's Coming'. He was a close friend. I had known him for a couple of years. We were a lot different. He was much more of an extrovert than me, but we grew very close. They say opposites attract."

== Release ==
"Someone's Coming" was released by EMI Records on 7" vinyl in the UK only. A promotional demo/DJ copy of the single was also issued by EMI. The single was released in a generic company sleeve. The B-Side, "Riding the Waves (For Virginia Woolf)", was written and produced by Harley. Taken from the Hobo with a Grin album, the song was recorded at Sunset Sound, Los Angeles. The song was later re-recorded for Harley's 1996 album Poetic Justice.

Following its release as a single, and on the Hobo with a Grin album, "Someone's Coming" has since appeared on the Steve Harley & Cockney Rebel 1988 Castle Communications compilation The Collection as part of the label's "The Collector Series".

== Critical reception ==
Upon its release as a single, Paul Morley of NME described "Someone's Coming" as "a watery ballad, with mournful steel guitar and flabby strings." He questioned the song's chart potential, commenting, "Harley is definitely one of the main benefactors of the new pop and without losing any respect (he never really had any) he could continue with his old perfidious, insidious pop and have a few hits. But... elderly popsters just want to grow serious, bare themselves and reveal the stretchmarks." Sandy Robertson of Sounds was negative in her review, remarking, "You see, the only polio victims who ever make good rock 'n' roll are Ian Dury and Kim Fowley." John Stacey of the Bolton Evening News commented, "Steve is slipping down the slope too quickly. The introduction of girlie singers, strings does not add much to this tedious rendition." Nick Kehoe of the Telegraph & Argus called the song a "highly sentimental ballad with Harley giving a bit of brotherly advice to a friend". He added, "Is this the former Cockney Rebel? Life in America must have mellowed him. I prefer the old rebel." Kehoe also reviewed the B-side, "Riding the Waves", in a different edition of the same paper, writing, "How America's West Coast has mellowed the Cockney Rebel. This is a superb ballad; nice and laidback but with just enough bite to make it instantly memorable." Jim Ward of the Harborough Mail was more positive of "Someone's Coming", noting that "a more relaxed Harley has turned his back on his frantic days with Cockney Rebel". He added that the song "almost has a country 'twang' about it" and the "nice guitars on the backing make it a pleasant listen".

In a review of Hobo with a Grin, Rosalind Russell of Disc commented, "The definition Harley had with Cockney Rebel has melted [and] he's gone fuzzy round the edges. He's also become surprisingly soppy. I can appreciate the idea behind 'Someone's Coming' for instance, but the emotion drenched drama is too strong to stomach." Russell added that the song "suffers from an oddly old fashioned arrangement" which she felt was "years out of date". Monty Smith of NME picked it as one of the album's "turkeys", calling it "somnambulistic". Chris Gibbons of the Buckinghamshire Examiner noted, "There is little of the bite or feeling that Cockney Rebel had – 'Someone's Coming', the one track where they all get together again, is even a limp track." In the US, Len Righi of The Morning Call remarked that "one of the best things about the song is Jo Partridge's guitar work".

== Track listing ==
7-inch single

1. "Someone's Coming" – 3:55
2. "Riding the Waves (For Virginia Woolf)" – 4:34

== Personnel ==
Someone's Coming

- Steve Harley – vocals
- Jo Partridge – electric guitar
- Marc Bolan – acoustic guitar, backing vocals
- Duncan Mackay – electric piano
- George Ford – bass
- Stuart Elliott – drums
- Lindsay Elliott – congas
- James Isaacson – tambourine
- Gloria Jones, Yvonne Keeley – backing vocals
- Jimmy Horowitz – strings arrangement

Riding the Waves (For Virginia Woolf)

- Steve Harley – vocals
- Jo Partridge – acoustic guitar, electric guitar
- Greg Porée – electric guitar
- Duncan Mackay – electric piano, synthesizer
- Bill Payne – piano
- Bob Glaub – bass
- Rick Shlosser – drums
- Bill Champlin, Bobby Kimball, Tom Kelley – backing vocals

Production

- Steve Harley – producer
- Michael J. Jackson – additional production, mixing
- James Isaacson – engineer, remixing, additional recording
- Tony Clark – engineer on "Someone's Coming"
- Haydn Bendall – assistant engineer – engineer on "Someone's Coming"
