= The Cream of Steve Harley & Cockney Rebel =

Compilation album by Steve Harley & Cockney Rebel
- Released: 15 March 1999
- Genres: Pop, Rock
- Length: 69:23
- Label: EMI Gold

Steve Harley & Cockney Rebel chronology
More Than Somewhat – The Very Best of Steve Harley (1998)	The Cream of Steve Harley & Cockney Rebel (1999)	Stripped to the Bare Bones (1999)

Alternative Cover
- 2008 reissue as "The Best of Steve Harley and Cockney Rebel"

The Cream of Steve Harley & Cockney Rebel is a compilation album by Steve Harley & Cockney Rebel, released by EMI Gold on 15 March 1999. It features material from Cockney Rebel, Steve Harley & Cockney Rebel and Harley's solo career. It contains sixteen tracks, covering Harley and the band's career from Cockney Rebel's 1973 album The Human Menagerie to Harley's 1979 album The Candidate, as well as the 1982 non-album single "I Can't Even Touch You". The album was reissued on 7 July 2008 as The Best of Steve Harley and Cockney Rebel.

== Background ==
The Cream of Steve Harley & Cockney Rebel was released on CD by EMI Gold in the UK on 15 March 1999, and followed another Steve Harley EMI compilation, More Than Somewhat – The Very Best of Steve Harley, released in 1998. The compilation later made an appearance in the official UK Budget Albums Chart during January 2006. It reached its peak at number 21 on 14 January 2006 and remained within the top 50 for four weeks.

The album was made available for download on 28 February 2003. On 7 July 2008, the album was reissued by EMI Gold in the UK and Europe as The Best of Steve Harley and Cockney Rebel. The release had the same track-listing and new artwork, with a photograph of Harley in front of a red background.

== Critical reception ==
Professional ratings
Review scores
Source	Rating
AllMusic	4/5 stars

Upon its release in 1999, the West Lancashire Evening Gazette described The Cream of Steve Harley & Cockney Rebel as "an excellent assessment of their work, with the best tracks all coming from their 1974 album Psychomodo". The reviewer noted that the "more extravagant, theatrical first album is ignored except for the melodramatic, strings-riddled 'Sebastian'" and added, "Best remembered for the infectious, summer-sounding hit 'Make Me Smile', Cockney Rebel brightened the mid Seventies at the tail-end of the glam rock explosion." Dave Thompson of AllMusic wrote, "This compilation brings together an unchallenging but almost uniformly excellent roundup of Harley's 1970s output. It brushes all of the expected high points. The real meat, however, lies among the excerpted album cuts, as the compilers treat all seven original Harley/Cockney Rebel LPs with more or less equal respect – many fans would have drawn a line after the first three. But 'White White Dove,' 'Roll the Dice,' and the like all deserve a fresh hearing, and The Cream of emerges with almost unruffled consistency, and an overall impact that is all the more satisfying for being so unexpected."

== Track listing ==
No.	Title	Writer(s)	Length
1.	"Make Me Smile (Come Up and See Me)"	Steve Harley	4:00
2.	"Judy Teen"	Harley	3:40
3.	"Here Comes the Sun"	George Harrison	2:56
4.	"(I Believe) Love's a Prima Donna"	Harley	4:09
5.	"The Best Years of Our Lives"	Harley	5:43
6.	"Another Journey"	Harley	2:49
7.	"Freedom's Prisoner"	Harley, Jimmy Horowitz	3:50
8.	"Tumbling Down"	Harley	5:49
9.	"Mr. Raffles (Man, It Was Mean)"	Harley	4:33
10.	"Roll the Dice"	Harley, Jo Partridge	3:26
11.	"Psychomodo"	Harley	4:03
12.	"Mr. Soft"	Harley	3:20
13.	"White, White Dove"	Harley	5:38
14.	"Sebastian"	Harley	6:57
15.	"(Love) Compared with You"	Harley	4:22
16.	"I Can't Even Touch You"	Harley	3:59

== Charts ==
Chart (2006)	Peak position
UK Budget Albums Chart	21

Chart (2024)	Peak position
UK Album Downloads Chart (OCC)	84

== Certifications ==
Region	Certification	Certified units/sales
United Kingdom (BPI)	Silver	60,000^{^}
^{^} Shipments figures based on certification alone.
