= Timeless Flight =

Studio album by Steve Harley & Cockney Rebel
- Released: 30 January 1976
- Genre: Glam rock
- Length: 41:40
- Label: EMI
- Producer: Steve Harley

Steve Harley & Cockney Rebel chronology
The Best Years of Our Lives (1975)	Timeless Flight (1976)	Love's a Prima Donna (1976)

Singles from Timeless Flight
- 1. "Black or White" Released: 14 November 1975; 2. "White, White Dove" Released: 6 February 1976

Timeless Flight is the fourth studio album by Steve Harley & Cockney Rebel, released by EMI on 30 January 1976. It was written and produced by Steve Harley.

== Background ==
Harley began writing material for Timeless Flight while Steve Harley & Cockney Rebel were touring to promote their 1975 album The Best Years of Our Lives. The band recorded Timeless Flight during the summer of 1975 at Trident Studios, Abbey Road Studios and Scorpio Sound Studio. The album was created in a more relaxed environment in comparison with The Best Years of Our Lives, which had been recorded quickly under considerable pressure. In 2003, Harley recalled, "It was a sweltering summer. It was incredibly hot. The songs, many of them being semi acoustic or laid back, I think stemmed as much from that as anything else. It made me a little lethargic." In a 1976 interview with Record Mirror & Disc, Harley revealed, "[The album] took about three months altogether and so much hard work went into it that as far as I'm concerned, it has to be the best I've done so far." He also told Sounds, "I've really learnt how to write songs now. The new album makes the others pale. This one is more live, although the production is heavier."

In a 1975 interview with Record Mirror & Disc, Harley described the album as "irreverent" and one which saw Cockney Rebel take a "huge leap forward". He said, "We're a real group now. It's taken us a year to get there but we've done it. Cockney Rebel are not just something I look on as my backing group. We're all in it together and I'm proud to be part of such a group. I really love those musicians." He added to Melody Maker in 1976, "I'm really proud of it. I've got a pride about this album as a piece of work which I've never had about anything I've ever done. As much as anything because of the boys in the band. I've let it become a group. It's not a dictatorship any more. I've given them all the freedom they could possibly want now. I respect that young men who are musicians have got to be able to have self-expression, and the album shows it."

Years after its release, Harley stated that Timeless Flight was his personal favourite from his own career. Speaking to The Leader in 2016, he said, "I call it the naughty child that became a favourite. It was slightly experimental. I was only 25 in 1976 and I just did what I wanted to do at that age and we thought it was going to be a monster hit and even though it wasn't, I'm still very proud of that album." In a 2004 interview with the fan site Harley Fanzone, Harley revealed,

"It's my precious boy, my favourite child. It was such a change for me and the critics weren't ready. I never realised it was the favourite of so many people. There's a lot of personal stuff in there. 'Red is a Mean, Mean Colour' is a really personal song for me and 'All Men Are Hungry' is another I like to sing. It's a song people can relate to."

== Song information ==
In 1983, Harley described Timeless Flight as "loosely a concept album with a lot of live and let live philosophy". At the time of writing the material for the album, Harley drew inspiration from his recent reading on Rosicrucianism, as well as the works of a number of French symbolists, including Charles Baudelaire.

"Red is a Mean, Mean Colour" is an anti-Communism song that Harley wrote while Cockney Rebel were in Yugoslavia to perform an arena concert. Harley told Record Mirror & Disc in 1976, "I haven't achieved what I set out to do with that one. People say it's a long-winded lyric, but really I was explicit as I could be. When it started out, it had 10 verses and I edited it down drastically. It's about the concept of a communist and you can't sum up a man in one sentence for Christsakes." Harley originally intended to record the song as an up-tempo rocker, but he ultimately chose to make it more of a mid-tempo piece. "Understand" was recorded by Patricia Paay for her 1975 album Beam of Light, which was produced by Harley, who at the time was in a relationship with Paay's sister, Yvonne Keeley. Harley later described the song as "a touch of the jazz world". The song has an improvised solo, played on a Mini-Moog synthesizer, which was performed in one take by keyboardist Duncan Mackay.

"All Men Are Hungry" was inspired by a trip Harley took to Belgrade. In his 2004 interview for the Harley Fanzone, he recalled, "Not everybody was in Belgrade and not everybody can see exactly what I saw that morning but everyone can reflect on the idea that everyone has a need and not everybody is fulfilled. Everybody needs space and time and that's what the song is about." In one of the song's verses, Harley refers to Ernest Hemingway's 1932 book Death in the Afternoon. "Nothing is Sacred" was written by Harley after he visited the banks of the Danube in Belgrade. He has described it as being about "young men's friendship and bonding in a rock band" and commented in 2003, "It's the true story of three of us [Harley, Cregan and Lindsay Elliott] staying up 'til dawn and partaking of the hedonism that one did in the Seventies." The song was recorded in the studio after most of Cockney Rebel and the recording crew had gone home. Harley wanted to try out the song in the studio and he ended up recording it with the band's second drummer Lindsay Elliott, bassist George Ford and guitarist Jim Cregan.

== Release ==
Preceding the release of the album was the single "Black or White", which was released in November 1975. Despite the chart success of "Make Me Smile (Come Up and See Me)" and "Mr. Raffles (Man, It Was Mean)" earlier in the year, "Black or White" failed to make an appearance in the UK Singles Chart. It did however reach number two in the UK Star Breakers Chart on 29 November 1975.

Timeless Flight was released in January 1976 and reached number 18 in the UK Albums Chart. According to Record Mirror & Disc, the album received 40,000 advance orders in America, despite the band's lack of a hit single or album there. In February 1976, the album's second single, "White, White Dove", was released. It also failed to reach the UK top 50, but peaked at number six in the UK Star Breakers Chart. In 2003, Harley recalled, "There were magic moments on Timeless Flight that I'd never experienced before. It wasn't the most commercial album ever. I understand that. But there you are. We're not machines, are we?"

The album received its first CD release by EMI in 1991. It featured two bonus tracks, the B-side of "White, White Dove", "Throw Your Soul Down Here", and a live version of "Mad Mad Moonlight", which was the B-side to "Black or White". In 2003 and again in 2011, BGO Records re-issued the album on CD with the same bonus tracks.

== Artwork ==
The sleeve design for Timeless Flight was carried out by Mick Rock. The photographs included on the inner sleeve were taken in Harley's living room at his flat in Harrowby Street, Marylebone.

== Tour ==
With the album's release, the band embarked on a British and European tour. Jo Partridge was hired to play rhythm guitar on the tour.

== Critical reception ==
Upon its release, Jonathan Barnett of the NME praised Timeless Flight as Harley's "best LP yet". He noted how the songwriter "bares his soul in the lyrics, and tries to come to terms with himself on vinyl", resulting in an album "as intense and as painfully personal as, say, Neil Young or David Bowie at their best". He found the band's "new laid-back, down-tempo" approach to be "much less hysterical and more tasteful than before" and felt that the "muted melodies match the spiritual remorse and disorientated insight of the words". He concluded that, while the album was "over-produced" and "a little too busy in the background" at times, with side two "nowhere near as emotionally energetic as side one", it was "an important work by a critically underrated talent". Ray Fox-Cumming of Record Mirror & Disc felt that the album was "not as consistently good or disciplined" as The Best Years of Our Lives, but believed it contained "enough of Harley at his best". He picked "All Men are Hungry", "Black or White" and "Nothing Is Sacred" as the album's "finest points". Geoff Barton of Sounds noted, "For the first half dozen or so listenings, Timeless Flight appears both unremarkable and confounding. With successive spins, however, you begin to find it gently imposing and, ultimately, quite compelling." Angus Mackinnon of Street Life considered the album to have "good music", but "questionable lyrical support systems". He concluded, "If you dig the words, the record's a Slumberland smooth double bed affair – and if you don't, you can just sleep on the floor."

N. Menhinick of the Harrow Observer praised Timeless Flight as "a beautifully put together album", with "good lyrics" and "excellent production". He noted, "Harley is far from a brilliant vocalist, but he has a fine writing ability, a great band and he knows what to put into an album." Roger Eversley of the Burton Observer and Chronicle felt the album saw Harley "slid[ing] deeper into his romantic imagination" and "takes a few more listens [than] its predecessors". He added, "The band are much tasteful than the original Cockney Rebel and at times when Harley's voice becomes unbearable, their accompaniment comes to the fore as a tight, accomplished sound."

Harry Doherty of Melody Maker was largely negative in his review, stating that Harley was "helped out of mediocrity only by the outstanding musicianship of his band". He believed that some of the tracks "could have made a lasting impression" but were "condemned to death by Harley becoming foolishly self indulgent", with what Doherty saw as "meaningless lyrics" through which Harley "has nothing to say and takes a long time to say it". He singled out "All Men Are Hungry" as a "beautifully-structured piece of work, with Harley staying within his limits to gain maximum effect", but concluded, "He has tried to make a masterpiece, but there is no maestro. And the sooner Harley realised that and works with Cockney Rebel as one, instead of setting himself apart, the better." Jon Ford of the Leicester Chronicle was also critical, remarking that Harley "over indulges in vocal pranks where restraint would be the more emphatic" and adding that "only the life-belt thrown out by Cockney Rebel's solid support saves him".

In the US, Cash Box noted Harley's "unique approach" and "coarsely narrative vocal technique" that "lends credibility to his deeply imaginative lyrics". They felt the album will "delight FM listeners with taste" and added that AM programmers "should not overlook" "Everything Changes" and "Don't Go, Don't Cry". Jon Marlowe of The Miami News described Timeless Flight as a "fine record", but "not the masterpiece that many feel Harley is striving to create". He added, "Timeless Flight at first is not that easy to listen to but then, Harley has never made himself easily accessible."

Ron Horan of the Cardunal Free Press praised the "beautiful album" as one "full of great music and a cohesive story of poetic imagery", and with "intelligence and cohesiveness. He considered Harley's "subdued vocals" to be kept at a "breathy, sensuous level" which he felt "attained a nice touch of emotional impact". David Milliken of Canada's Ottawa Journal considered the album to be "steeped in heavy poetic imagery". He noted, "Essentially a poet, Harley is best enjoyed by listening closely to his lyrics. It's difficult at times to figure out what he's singing about. Nevertheless it is immensely enjoyable." Milliken also praised the songs and arrangements for being "refreshingly different".

=== Retrospective reviews ===
Professional ratings
Review scores
Source	Rating
AllMusic	2/5 stars
Q	2/5 stars
Select	2/5 stars

In a review of the 1991 EMI CD release, Mark Sinker of Select felt the songs on Timeless Flight were "larded with by-the-yard pastel soul clichés, florid piano, 'Astral Weeks'-ish 'adult' guitar [and] poet-in-a-smoking-jacket crooning." John Aizlewood in Q Magazine described the same release as "a brave folly" and gave it three stars.

Writing about the 2003 BGO re-issue, Martin Aston of Q felt the album was a "fans-only purchase" and concluded, "Harley blamed 1976's sapping heatwave for the fact that he traded such pop perfection [The Best Years of Our Lives] for a dense, tricky, almost anti-glam party line that exploited his new crew's session-musician skills. Timeless Flight bears plenty of Harley's melodic hallmarks, but some complex tripwires keep popping up." Donald A. Guarisco of AllMusic considered the album to be even more "ambitious" and "artsy" than its predecessor, but that it also "neglects the strong pop hooks that made The Best Years of Our Lives so appealing". He said, "Much of Timeless Flight finds Harley getting bogged down in deliberately impenetrable wordplay and songs that, despite slick arrangements, are rather hookless vehicles for the verbose lyrics." Guarisco picked "Red Is a Mean, Mean Colour" and "Understand" as the album's highlights.

== Track listing ==
All tracks are written by Steve Harley.

No.	Title	Length
1.	"Red is a Mean, Mean Colour"	4:29
2.	"White, White Dove"	5:36
3.	"Understand"	7:14
4.	"All Men Are Hungry"	4:50
5.	"Black or White"	5:48
6.	"Everything Changes"	2:23
7.	"Nothing is Sacred"	5:42
8.	"Don't Go, Don't Cry"	5:04

1991 EMI and 2003 BGO CD bonus tracks
No.	Title	Length
9.	"Throw Your Soul Down Here"	4:03
10.	"Mad, Mad Moonlight (Live)"	5:09

== Personnel ==
Steve Harley & Cockney Rebel

- Steve Harley – vocals
- Jim Cregan – guitar, backing vocals
- George Ford – bass guitar, backing vocals
- Duncan Mackay – keyboards, string arrangement on "Black or White"
- Stuart Elliott – drums, percussion
- Lindsay Elliott – percussion

Additional musicians

- Patricia Paay – backing vocals (track 3)
- Yvonne Keeley, Barry St. John – backing vocals (tracks 3, 5)
- Madeline Bell, Peter Clarke, Larry Steele, Liza Strike, Leroy Wiggins, Joy Yates – backing vocals (track 5)

Production

- Steve Harley – producer
- Peter Kelsey – engineer (tracks 1–2, 4, 6, 8)
- Tony Clark – remix engineer (all tracks), engineer (track 2)
- Ray Hendriksen – engineer (tracks 3, 7)
- John Kurlander – engineer (track 5)
- John Leckie – engineer (track 5)
- Chris Blair – master cutter

Design

- Mick Rock – sleeve design, photography, art direction
- Steve Ridgeway – art direction, lettering
- Julie Harris – lettering

== Charts ==
Chart (1976)	Peak position
Australia (Kent Music Report)	98
Dutch Albums (Album Top 100)	18
UK Albums (OCC)	18

== Certifications ==
Region	Certification	Certified units/sales
United Kingdom (BPI)	Silver	60,000^{^}
^{^} Shipments figures based on certification alone.
