= Hobo with a Grin =

Studio album by Steve Harley
- Released: 14 July 1978
- Genre: Pop rock
- Length: 39:48
- Label: EMI
- Producer: Steve Harley; Michael James Jackson

Steve Harley chronology
| Face to Face: A Live Recording (1977) | Hobo with a Grin (1978) | The Candidate (1979) |

Singles from Hobo with a Grin
- 1. "Roll the Dice" Released: 14 July 1978; 2. "Someone's Coming" Released: March 1979

Hobo with a Grin is the debut solo studio album by English singer-songwriter Steve Harley, released by EMI on 14 July 1978. The album was produced by Harley, except for "Roll the Dice", which was produced by Michael J. Jackson. Jackson also acted as additional producer on the album.

== Background ==
In July 1977, Harley disbanded Steve Harley & Cockney Rebel and began working on his debut solo album, which had the working title Couples. Some of the material was written while Cockney Rebel were still active and other tracks were penned after their split. Recording sessions for six of the album's tracks at Abbey Road Studios in London was completed by early 1978, and during that February Harley then flew to Los Angeles to record a further three tracks in Los Angeles at Sunset Sound and Record Plant. The album featured contributions from ex-Cockney Rebel members and session musicians, including Jim Cregan, George Ford, Duncan Mackay (who remained Harley's "musical director" until 1978), Stuart Elliott, Gloria Jones, Marc Bolan, as well as American musicians such as Tom Moncrieff, Bob Glaub, Bill Payne, Roy Kenner, Bobby Kimball and Michael McDonald.

Hobo with a Grin cost £70,000 and took 18 months to make. With its completion, Harley left Britain to live in Los Angeles, which was something he had decided to do as early as December 1977. He was first attracted to the city when mixing Cockney Rebel's album Love's a Prima Donna there in 1976. Harley rented a house in Beverly Hills and lived there for nearly a year to gain new experience and inspirations, although he later admitted he never wrote a single song while living in the US.

When Hobo with a Grin was released to poor reviews and little commercial success, Harley quickly became dismissive of the album. Describing the material as "laid back Californian stuff", Harley told Superpop in 1978, "My latest album had no guts. I hated it. For the first time in my life I relinquished responsibility, listened to advice and acted on it, rather than do what I thought was right." He told the Daily Star that the album was "an experience", and in early 1979, told Maggi Russell that it was a "difficult album, and hard to market".

Harley returned to live in England at the end of 1978 and began working on his second solo album The Candidate, which was released in 1979. Speaking to the Evening News that year, Harley said of Hobo with a Grin, "I looked at that LP the other day – looking is enough. I can't bear to listen to it. It's the worst thing I've ever done. I just want to forget about it. Trash. In fact, I'm getting the old Cockney Rebel band together for a concert in London at the end of this month. And there won't be one song from the LP in the set." Harley's animosity for Hobo with a Grin has changed years after its release. Speaking to The Cockney Rebel Connections Show in 2020, he said it's an "interesting album" with "some really good moments on it".

== Song information ==
Both "Amerika the Brave" and "Someone's Coming" feature contributions from Marc Bolan in his last studio performance, which took place at AIR Studios on 26 July 1977, less than two months before his death. Bolan provided guitar on "Amerika the Brave" and both guitar and backing vocals on "Someone's Coming", although he did not receive an official credit for the latter track. Speaking of Bolan's playing on "Amerika the Brave", Harley later recalled, "He plays fantastic electric guitar for me on that. He play[ed] his Les Paul. I paid his fee, but he wouldn't take it." In 1978, Harley recalled to The Morning Call of his friendship with Bolan, "I had known him for a couple of years. We were a lot different. He was much more of an extrovert than me, but we grew very close. They say opposites attract." Although it was not released as a single, 'Amerika the Brave' gained some disco play in the US. Harley described the song as being "my impression of the U.S... just telling what I see".

"I Wish It Would Rain" is a cover of the 1967 song originally recorded by The Temptations. Harley revealed to The Morning Call that he replaced the song's R&B sound with a more rock and roll one, "I wanted to have a more rock and roll feel than The Temptations version. I defend it."

"Riding the Waves (For Virginia Woolf)" was dedicated to the 20th century British writer Virginia Woolf. Harley admitted, "I stole two or three lines from her book, "The Waves," for that song". The song has been a consistent inclusion in Harley and the band's live sets (except between 2016 and 2020, before being reintroduced in 2021), much more so than any of the other songs on the album (though "Roll The Dice" did get played routinely between 1989 and 1992), however it is usually played in a much slower, acoustic arrangement when played live, with much improvisation after the lyrics have finished, with a call-and-response section added to the song from 2004 onwards. Harley would eventually play the album arrangement of the song for the first time in 2022, at a show celebrating his 70th Birthday that took place the year prior. Harley would later re-record the song for his 1996 album Poetic Justice, though the version presented on this album is a recording of the aforementioned live arrangement of the track, as presented during one of Harley's concerts. Harley wrote "(I Don't Believe) God is an Anarchist" at the time when the UK music scene was becoming dominated by punk rock. He told Larry Jaffee in 1982, "I never have agreed with a violent pose just because of fashion. It's a terrifying prospect that people wear army uniforms or leather and chains because of fashion. It makes them think wicked thoughts."

== Release ==
Hobo with a Grin was released by EMI Records in the UK and Europe in July 1978, and by Capitol Records in North America. The album was generally met with poor reviews and failed to achieve commercial success. The first single, "Roll the Dice", was released in the UK in July and the US in August, but failed to generate chart action. A second single released in the UK, a remixed version of "Someone's Coming", suffered a similar fate when it was released in February 1979.

In 2000, Hobo with a Grin received its first CD release through Harley's own label, Comeuppance Discs. It contained two bonus tracks, the 1974 song "Spaced Out", which was the B-side of "Judy Teen", and a live version of the 1996 song "That's My Life in Your Hands" from Poetic Justice. On 31 October 2011, Hobo with a Grin was digitally remastered and released on CD by BGO Records as a double album set with The Candidate.

== Promotion ==
Music videos for "Roll the Dice", "I Wish It Would Rain" and "Amerika the Brave" were filmed in the Bakersfield, California, to promote the album. The videos were shot on 35mm film over a two-day period. The video for "Roll the Dice" surfaced on YouTube in 2016.

== Critical reception ==
Professional ratings
Review scores
| Source | Rating |
|---|---|
| Poughkeepsie Journal | 3/5 stars |
| Record Mirror | 2/5 stars |
| Sounds | 1/5 stars |

Upon its release, Pete Silverton of Sounds commented, "Harley's album is undoubtedly the worst slab of vinyl from a relatively major artist since Framper's I'm in You. Try 'Amerika the Brave' – which, sad though it is to admit, has the best tune on the album and could make a single. Beyond the superficial Randy Newmanish attraction of the melody, 'Living in a Rhapsody' displays an even deeper understanding of the meaning of life. Other highlights: a version of 'I Wish It Would Rain' so spineless that it made me dig out my old Marvin Gaye single; a strong contender for dork of the year with '(I Don't Believe) God is an Anarchist', and, finally, overall unbounded happiness that he's relocated in palm tree and cocaine city. Keep it up, Steve." Rosalind Russell of Record Mirror wrote, "If Steve Harley thinks this is rock and roll, he's living in his own nightmare. Except he probably doesn't see it that way: to him it must be a beautiful dream. The definition he had with Cockney Rebel has melted, he's gone fuzzy round the edges. He's also become surprisingly soppy. The only track I even began to like was 'Amerika the Brave'. It has a kick, it has some of the Harley bite. But, apart from this, the album has no teeth to speak of. Just a gentle, un-threatening wave of the jaw, like a dreamer murmuring in his sleep." Pauline McLeod of the Daily Mirror remarked that Harley "still sounds much the same", although he has "obviously been influenced by his new surroundings". A reviewer for the Swindon Evening Advertiser noted that Harley had "surrounded himself with some first class talent" to record a "tightly produced album". However, he felt that, with the exception of "I Wish It Would Rain", it was "not especially entertaining".

Record Business considered it an "easily forgettable album" and a "rather insipid offering", with the exception of the "catchy" "Roll the Dice" and "fast rocker" "(I Don't Believe) God is an Anarchist". The reviewer noted Harley's vocals "remain as distinctive as ever", but added the album is "mainly a collection of mid-tempo, standard easy listening" which was "probably the influence of his newly adopted American residence". Nick Olson of The Northern Echo called it a "tame collection" on which the "jazz-influenced backing fails to lift any track for more than a few moments" and Harley's voice is "just not strong enough to carry off a convincing lyric". John Stacey of the Bolton Evening News called it a "big disappointment: a meandering, confusing mixture of supercilious cocktail bar funk-edged and weak-kneed rock". Music Week believed the material is "not top drawer Harley, despite plenty of creativity". Monty Smith of NME noted the "undeniable and debilitating US FM sheen", which he felt created "loads of surface, little substance". He concluded that "Harley, besides being guilty of gross gaucherie and cretinous moralising, is singlehandedly attempting to resuscitate the bloated body of Tory rock, forgetting that it never really existed in the first place". A reviewer for the Shropshire Star admitted they "never really liked" Cockney Rebel but felt Harley's debut solo album to be "far worse than anything I remember them producing". They continued, "It could almost be an attempt to show that an English singer can match any American for blandness." Mike Priestley of the Telegraph & Argus was more positive in his review, stating that Harley has a "fine talent as a writer and performer" and the album "contains nine good songs".

In the US, Billboard noted, "Harley explores a number of musical styles here from a solid rock 'n' roll base. Lots of rock instrumentation is employed. Some tunes have a bluesy, R&B quality, while others have a soft, melodic feel. Overall the writing is poignant and Harley's voice has a pleasing pop sound. Cash Box felt the album " focuses upon Harley's irreverent, charismatic songwriting style and personality". They wrote, "Hobo with a Grin contains a diverse array of material, ranging from the intimately-designed 'Living in a Rhapsody' to the exuberant 'Roll the Dice'. Backed up by several top session cats, Harley on this LP is finally set to attract a sizable U.S. following." Record World felt the album was "distinguished by several notable songs ('Amerika the Brave', 'Roll the Dice') and some excellent performances". They added, "His pleasing voice covers a wide range of material, sounding most comfortable with pop ballads."

Len Righi of the American newspaper The Morning Call stated, "Two of the finest cuts on the LP are 'Riding the Waves' and '(I Don't Believe) God Is an Anarchist.' The former has a nice melody, poetic images, acoustic piano by Bill Payne of Little Feat, and Jo Partridge's oh-so-sweet guitar. The latter song features a powerful vocal and an R&B flavour." The Poughkeepsie Journal said: "This is Harley's most Americanized recording, and I think his best. While he'll never be the paradoxical combination of David Bowie and Bruce Springsteen he sometimes seems, Harley is a real rocker – smart enough to sing the Temptations' 'I Wish It Would Rain' better than Mick Jagger's ever covered Motown, dumb enough to dedicate a song to Virginia Woolf. Don't trust either – "Hot Youth" is this album's most blatant pitch to its potential audience, and the best Harley song I've ever heard."

=== Retrospective reviews ===
Professional ratings
Review scores
| Source | Rating |
|---|---|
| AllMusic | 1.5/5 stars |
| Q | 4/5 stars |
| Record Collector | 2/5 stars |

Dave Thompson of AllMusic retrospectively stated, "Hobo with a Grin marks the utter desecration of everything which Harley once stood for. Two new songs peep out of Hobo with anything remotely resembling pride – 'Riding the Waves' has sufficient art house pretension to remind us of 'Mr. Soft' and his friends; and 'Living in a Rhapsody' shares a vague familial resemblance to 'Make Me Smile.' There's also a smartly stylized cover of the Temptations' 'I Wish It Would Rain,' which possesses a heartfelt joyousness all the same. But 'Amerika the Brave,' 'God Is an Anarchist,' and 'Roll the Dice' are Harley wordplay-by-numbers: clever on paper, but too clever-clever by half. We already know he's a brilliant wordsmith; does he have to keep trying to show us how brilliant? And does there come a point when he'll stop, and try his hand at tunes as well? At its best, the bulk of Hobo is almost completely devoid of memorable melody. At its worst, it doesn't even pretend to care."

In a review of the 2000 re-issue, Q said, "Sneered at then, it's aged rather well. Harley's self-production is as lush as his songs deserve, the towering 'Roll the Dice' features Michael McDonald on backing vocals and 'Riding the Waves (For Virginia Woolf)' is the sound of a man who'd been boorish as a star maturing into dignified old age. Charts remained untickled. Time surely for a little readjustment of history." Reviewing the 2011 BGO double CD release of the album with The Candidate, Terry Staunton of Record Collector stated, "Harley's opening brace of releases not to feature the Cockney Rebel name took him ever further away from the glam/art rock of his chart past. As road maps to what he had in mind for the next stage of his career, they're both a tad confused, arrows scrawled all over them in numerous directions. Hobo takes stabs at anything and everything; 'Amerika The Brave' stutters with Bowie bombast, 'Living in a Rhapsody' and 'Riding the Waves' tentatively exploring the subdued folk of Nick Drake, while a cover of The Temptations' 'I Wish It Would Rain' has the bleary-eyed fatigue of last orders pub-rock."

== Track listing ==
| No. | Title | Writer(s) | Length |
|---|---|---|---|
| 1. | "Roll the Dice" | Steve Harley, Jo Partridge | 3:31 |
| 2. | "Amerika the Brave" | Harley | 4:56 |
| 3. | "Living in a Rhapsody" | Jim Cregan, Harley, Duncan Mackay | 4:22 |
| 4. | "I Wish It Would Rain" | Roger Penzabene, Barrett Strong, Norman Whitfield | 3:20 |
| 5. | "Riding the Waves (For Virginia Woolf)" | Harley | 4:34 |
| 6. | "Someone's Coming" | Harley, Partridge | 4:36 |
| 7. | "Hot Youth" | Harley, Mackay | 2:52 |
| 8. | "(I Don't Believe) God is an Anarchist" | Harley | 7:24 |
| 9. | "Faith, Hope and Charity" | Harley | 4:01 |

2000 Comeuppance Discs CD bonus tracks
| No. | Title | Writer(s) | Length |
|---|---|---|---|
| 10. | "Spaced Out" | Harley | 3:01 |
| 11. | "That's My Life in Your Hands (Live)" | Harley, Hugh Nicholson | 3:39 |

== Personnel ==
- Steve Harley – vocals
- Jo Partridge – electric guitars (tracks 1, 6), guitar (track 2), acoustic guitar (tracks 5–7), lead guitar (track 5), electric guitar (track 7)
- Fred Tackett – acoustic guitar (track 1)
- Marc Bolan – guitar (track 2), acoustic guitar (track 6), backing vocals (track 6)
- Jim Cregan – acoustic guitar, electric guitar (track 3)
- Ian Bairnson – acoustic guitar, electric guitars (track 4)
- Tom Moncrieff – electric guitar solo (track 4)
- Greg Porée – electric guitar (tracks 5, 8), classical guitar (track 8)
- Bill Payne – acoustic piano (tracks 1, 3, 5, 8), organ (track 4)
- Duncan Mackay – electric piano (tracks 1, 5–6), harpsichord (track 1), synthesizer (tracks 1–3, 5, 8–9), keyboards (tracks 2, 7, 9), piano (track 4), Hammond organ (track 8)
- Chris Mercer – saxophone (track 2)
- Bob Glaub – bass guitar (tracks 1, 5)
- Alan Jones – bass guitar (track 4)
- George Ford – bass guitar (track 6)
- Herbie Flowers – acoustic bass (track 7)
- Reggie McBride – bass guitar (track 8)
- Rick Shlosser – drums (tracks 1, 5)
- Ricky Fataar – drums (tracks 2, 4)
- Stuart Elliott – drums (track 6)
- Paul Humphrey – drums (track 8)
- Michael J. Jackson – percussion (track 1), intro piano (track 9)
- Simon Morton – percussion (track 2), additional percussion (track 8)
- Chris Caron – percussion (track 2), additional percussion (track 8)
- Luís Jardim – percussion (tracks 2, 7), additional percussion (track 8)
- James Isaacson – tambourine (track 6), drums (track 9)
- Lindsey Elliott – congas (track 6)
- King Errisson – congas (track 8)
- Michael McDonald – backing vocals (track 1)
- Bill Champlin – backing vocals (tracks 1, 5)
- Rosemary Butler – backing vocals (tracks 1, 4)
- Bobby Kimball – backing vocals (tracks 1, 5)
- Tom Kelley – backing vocals (tracks 1, 5)
- Yvonne Keeley – backing vocals (tracks 2–3, 6, 8–9)
- John Townsend – backing vocals (track 4)
- Roy Kenner – backing vocals (track 4)
- Gloria Jones – backing vocals (tracks 6, 9)
- Barry St. John – backing vocals (track 8)
- Jimmy Horowitz – string arrangement (tracks 3–4, 6), horn arrangement (track 3)

Production

- Steve Harley – producer (all tracks)
- Michael J. Jackson – producer (track 1), additional production (all tracks), mixing (all tracks)
- James Isaacson – remix engineer (all tracks), additional recording (all tracks), engineer (tracks 1, 5)
- John Haeny – engineer (track 1)
- Tony Clark – engineer (tracks 2–3, 6–7, 9)
- Peter James – engineer (track 4)
- Gary Ladinsky – engineer (track 8)
- Paul Black – assistant engineer (track 1)
- Haydn Bendall – assistant engineer (tracks 2–3, 6–7, 9)
- Ken Perry – mastering

Sleeve

- Jim Shea – photography
- Kosh – design

== Charts ==
| Chart (1978) | Peak position |
|---|---|
| Australia (Kent Music Report) | 100 |
| UK Album Chart Top 60 (Record Business) | 50 |
