= Beam of Light (Patricia Paay album) =

Studio album by Patricia Paay
- Released: 1975
- Length: 35:54
- Label: EMI
- Producer: Steve Harley

Patricia Paay chronology
Beam of Light (1975)	The Lady Is a Champ (1977)

Beam of Light is the second studio album from Dutch singer Patricia Paay, which was released by EMI in 1975.

== Background ==
In 1975, Paay returned to working as a solo artist after spending two years as the lead singer of the Dutch music band Heart, who were signed to the EMI-Bovema label. When they disbanded in 1975, Paay remained signed to EMI to relaunch her solo career, whereas the rest of Heart signed to Ariola under the new name Limousine. Paay soon went to England to record Beam of Light at Abbey Road Studios, with Steve Harley as the producer, who at the time was in a relationship with Paay's sister, Yvonne Keeley. The album was recorded with contributions from members of Cockney Rebel, primarily Jim Cregan on guitar and Duncan Mackay on keyboards. Bassist George Ford and drummer Stuart Elliott play on three tracks, while others feature Herbie Flowers on bass and Tony Newman on drums.

In addition to producing the album, Harley had Paay record a version of Cockney Rebel's 1973 song "Sebastian", as well as one of his newly penned songs, "Understand". Steve Harley and Cockney Rebel also recorded their "Understand" during the summer of 1975 for their fourth studio album Timeless Flight. Paay contributes backing vocals on Cockney Rebel's recording of the track.

Speaking of her working relationship with Harley, Paay told The Evening News in 1977, "He helped me produce an album in London and we argued all the time. He is very strong and stubborn about his work and I wasn't used to the way he spoke to me. But I respect his judgement and I'd certainly like to work with him again."

== Release ==
Beam of Light was released in the Netherlands and Germany in 1975, and in the UK in 1976. "Can You Please Crawl Out Your Window" was released as the album's first single in the UK, the Netherlands and Belgium in 1975. "Children Come Home" was released as the second and final single in the Netherlands only in 1976. When the album and its singles did not generate commercial success, Paay opted to adopt a disco-orientated sound and would go on to achieve chart success in the Netherlands.

In 2006, EMI released Beam of Light for the first time on CD, as part of a four-album set together with Paay's other EMI albums The Lady Is a Champ (1977), Malibu Touch (1978) and Playmate (1981).

== Critical reception ==
Upon its release in the UK, Alan Harris of the Burton Observer & Chronicle praised the album as "excellent" and a "fine package", with Paay presenting herself as a "strong vocal talent". He wrote, "Paay's voice is clear and sweet, yet powerful, enabling her to sail majestically through tracks such as Bob Dylan's 'Can You Please Crawl Out Your Window', Led Zeppelin's 'Stairway to Heaven' and Ian Samwell's 'Love Where Are You Now That I Need You'." Harris added that Harley had produced the album "with a high degree of skill", leaving "one [with] visions of a female Harley droning through the nine tracks". He described "Understand" as "classy", "Sebastian" as "haunting" and "Tiger and a Lion" as the album's only disappointing track. Gerald Radcliffe of the Huddersfield Daily Examiner noted, "[Paay's] voice doesn't yet have any remarkable distinction, but what she does have is very well displayed with the help of a reasonably good selection of songs, competent production and excellent musicianship." He added that Harley had "restrained his more flamboyant and highly individualistic tendencies to produce a very tight and promising album", with the "support of musicians like Jim Cregan, Duncan Mackay and Herbie Flowers [giving] the album a touch of class". He picked "Stairway to Heaven" as being "almost worth the price of the album [alone]", but also noted the "equally fine" covers of "Sebastian", "Understand" and "Can You Please Crawl Out Your Window".

A reviewer for the Shropshire Star wrote, "Paay has every assistance with the distinctive backing of Cockney Rebel on this LP. An interesting sound and full marks for tackling the Harley classic 'Sebastian'." Richard Groom of the Evening News and Star felt that Paay "attacks the songs with vigour and enthusiasm, but never manages to capture the mind, heart, or soul". He concluded, "All in all, it's a mixed bunch, which perhaps does not give full vent to Patricia's talents. At least she sings with feeling; it's just that much of that feeling is lost in the overall production and instrumentation." Ramsay Smith of the Aberdeen Evening Express was also critical of the release, writing, "This album should be in mint condition well into the 21st century. The only good moments on it (and there aren't many) belong to Harley who produced it – though I'm not sure why he bothered."

== Track listing ==
No.	Title	Writer(s)	Length
1.	"Love Where Are You Now That I Need You"	Ian Samwell, Bobby Tench	3:02
2.	"Million Dollars"	Ad van Olm	3:00
3.	"Stairway to Heaven"	Jimmy Page, Robert Plant	6:50
4.	"Children Come Home"	Rosa van Leer, Thys van Leer	3:52
5.	"Can You Please Crawl Out Your Window"	Bob Dylan	3:58
6.	"Understand"	Steve Harley	4:32
7.	"Beautiful Woman"	Patricia Paay, Okkie Huysdens	3:27
8.	"Sebastian"	Harley	4:25
9.	"Tiger and a Lion"	Paay, Van Olm	2:48

== Personnel ==
- Patricia Paay – vocals (all tracks)
- Jim Cregan – guitars (tracks 1–7, 9), backing vocals (tracks 3, 6, 9)
- Duncan Mackay – keyboards (tracks 1–7, 9)
- Herbie Flowers – bass (tracks 1–2, 4–5, 7)
- George Ford – bass (tracks 3, 6, 9), backing vocals (tracks 3, 6, 9)
- Tony Newman – drums (tracks 1–2, 4–5, 7)
- Stuart Elliott – drums (tracks 3, 6, 9)
- Yvonne Keeley – backing vocals (tracks 3, 6, 9)
- Barry St. John – backing vocals (tracks 3, 6, 9)
- Andrew Powell – arranger (track 8)

Production

- Steve Harley – producer
- Tony Clark – engineer

Other

- Peter Shepherd – sleeve design
