= Black or White (Steve Harley & Cockney Rebel song) =

1975 song by Steve Harley & Cockney Rebel

Single by Steve Harley & Cockney Rebel

from the album Timeless Flight
- B-side: "Mad, Mad Moonlight" (Live)
- Released: 14 November 1975
- Genre: Rock
- Length: 5:43
- Label: EMI
- Songwriter(s): Steve Harley
- Producer(s): Steve Harley

Steve Harley & Cockney Rebel singles chronology
"Mr. Raffles (Man, It Was Mean)" (1975)	"Black or White" (1975)	"White, White Dove" (1976)

"Black or White" is a song by British rock band Steve Harley & Cockney Rebel, released on 14 November 1975 as the lead single from their fourth studio album Timeless Flight (1976). The song was written and produced by Harley.

== Writing ==
"Black or White" was inspired by the 1925 poem "The Hollow Men" by the British poet T. S. Eliot. Harley revealed to The Observer in 1976 that T. S. Eliot is a big hero to him, and that he used the form of his poem to write "Black or White". When Harley wrote the song, he intended for it to be a future single.

Speaking of the song's lyrical message, Harley told Record Mirror & Disc in 1975,

"Basically the song is about hypocrisy and I deliberately put it out in time for Christmas. I enjoy Christmas as much as anyone else, but it is a hypocritical thing. It's all peace and brotherhood and that – but why can't it last all year through? There's too much compromise about hypocritical compromise. People should be more positive, more extreme and that's the message of the song – make your mind up and quick."

== Recording ==
"Black or White" was recorded at Abbey Road Studios in London. The song features a 10-piece choir, made up of members of the band and other backing vocalists, including Madeline Bell, Yvonne Keeley and Barry St. John. The song's strings were arranged by the band's keyboardist Duncan Mackay.

In a 1975 interview with Record Mirror & Disc, Harley said about the song's recording, "I worked very hard on it. I spent seven days and seven nights on the backing tracks and, over three months, I mixed it four times to get it right. The choir we used on it is very big." He added of Mackay's contributions to the track, "The [string arrangement] was done by our keyboard player, Duncan Mackay, using ten celloes and ten violas – no violins. Duncan's a Doctor of Music and knows all about these things, so he was obviously the right man for the job."

== Release ==
"Black or White" was released as single in November 1975, preceding the release of Timeless Flight by three months. Despite the band's UK chart success earlier in 1975 with the number-one single "Make Me Smile (Come Up and See Me)" and its top 20 follow-up "Mr. Raffles (Man, It Was Mean)", "Black or White" failed to enter the UK Singles Chart. It did however reach number two in the UK Star Breakers Chart on 29 November 1975.

In his 1975 interview with Record Mirror & Disc, Harley complained that the song's lack of success was due to the limited airplay it received on BBC Radio, "I'm very proud of the track. It isn't getting BBC airplay though, and I feel very let down by them. However, it is encouraging that the few people who have heard the record on the smaller commercial stations have liked it enough to go out and buy it." Speaking of the single's chart failure to Record Mirror & Disc in early 1976, Harley commented, "I knew it was either going to be massive – top three – or a complete stiff. It turned out to be a stiff." Later in 2011, Harley was also critical of EMI's handling of the release, commenting, "They didn't get it in the right shops at the right time and promote it properly."

The commercial failure of the single had an impact on Harley. He admitted to Sounds in 1976, "I went through a terrible period of depression. I was in a state of shock about something. Maybe it was the single 'Black or White' not taking off. I don't like fading. I'd be in my manager's office having a quick look at the music papers. Not a mention of me. I'd get really strung out thinking, 'Have they forgotten me already?' I really believed I [was] finished."

"Black or White" was released by EMI Records as a 7-inch single in the UK, the Netherlands, Belgium, Germany, Italy and Japan. The B-side is a live version of "Mad, Mad Moonlight", an album track originally recorded for the band's 1975 album The Best Years of Our Lives. This version was recorded live at the Hammersmith Odeon, London, on 14 April 1975.

== Promotion ==
Due to the band's touring commitments in the United States in late 1975, making a potential appearance on Top of the Pops difficult, a £3,000 music video was shot in Studio 3 at Abbey Road Studios for the single. It was directed by Mick Rock, who was also responsible for the photographs and sleeve design for Timeless Flight. The hoodie which Harley wore in the video was made by Yvonne Keeley, who was his girlfriend and backing vocalist at the time.

In the UK, the band performed the song live on the ITV music programme Supersonic, but the footage has since been wiped and presumed lost. In the Netherlands, the band performed the song on the AVRO TV show TopPop. According to an article in the Dutch-Belgian magazine Joepie, Harley was "anything but cooperative and gave the director a lot of headaches" during filming.

In November 2012, the band performed the song live at the Birmingham Symphony Hall, alongside the first two Cockney Rebel albums in their entirety. The performance was released on both CD and DVD in 2013 as Birmingham (Live with Orchestra & Choir).

== Critical reception ==
On its release, Ray Fox-Cumming of Record Mirror & Disc noted the song's "heavy piano cadences", "full blast orchestra", "massive chorus" and "interesting [but] incomprehensible lyrics". He also drew some similarity between "Black or White" and Queen's "Bohemian Rhapsody" for both being "grandiose affairs" of "epic length and proportions". He added, "This, however, is a more coherent opus than Queen's and to my mind, the better record." He predicted the song would be a number one hit. Burton Daily Mail felt the song would not be a hit, describing it as "a slow to grow orchestrated ballad that would sound better as an album track". Dutch-Belgian magazine Joepie felt the song was "a worthy successor" to "Make Me Smile (Come Up and See Me)". The Newry Reporter praised the "powerful single" as one of "epic length and proportions not unlike" Queen's "Bohemian Rhapsody", but "at the same time totally different". They concluded, "All [of] Harley's efforts on disc have been well above average and this is no exception. A top class single which deserves to go to No. 1."

On initial hearing, Jim Green of Trouser Press felt it was a "pedestrian tune, fitted out with his usual obscure lyrics", but found that, after repeated listens, "the more striking the effect". He noted that the melody "turns out to be a hymn or anthem surrounding the chorus", put the "effectiveness" of the chorus down to the "use of strings", which are "coupled with the bass in a neat obbligato figure and either phased or put through a Leslie", and described the middle section as "a stately theme in a haunting minor key". He added that Harley's vocal was "among the least affected", sounding "nasal and English, and reminiscent of Ray Davies ballad style". A reviewer for St Andrews Citizen described it as a "wordy and epically proportioned release in a much less commercial 'pop' vein" than "Make Me Smile". They noted the opening "doomy piano chords" and how the song "builds really well" to its "massed chorus", while Harley gives a "highly emotional performance, sounding like the anguished, tortured fellow we've all been told he is". They felt the song "never quite fills its promise of grandeur, despite the orchestra backing" and considered Harley's "obscure and woolly round the edges" lyrics to be "difficult to understand", but concluded it was a "highly dramatic piece" which "can't fail to be another hit". Mike Pryce of the Worcester Evening News noted the "good production", but considered the song itself to be "too shallow", with Harley "invariably sound[ing] not quite up to the material, which is strange since he [wrote] it".

In a review of Timeless Flight, Angus Mackinnon of Street Life encouraged listeners to "swoon to the widescreen piano arpeggios introducing 'Black or White' and the song's orchestral arrangements, both courtesy of Mackay". He considered the lyrics to "concern the spiritual state of man". Stewart Parker, for his "High Pop" column in The Irish Times said, "T. S. Elliott verses kick off the second side in 'Black or White', which contains perhaps the most tuneless singing on the album." Dave Thompson of AllMusic retrospectively reviewed Timeless Flight and noted the song displayed "deliberately impenetrable wordplay", but highlighted it as an album standout by labelling it an 'AMG Pick Track'. In 2003, Martin Aston of Q wrote, "Timeless Flight bears plenty of Harley's melodic hallmarks, but some complex tripwires keep popping up: 'Black or White' is a rare showing of Rebel soulfulness but the tempo is lethargic."

== Track listing ==
7-inch single

1. "Black or White" – 5:43
2. "Mad, Mad Moonlight" (Live) – 5:03

== Personnel ==
Steve Harley & Cockney Rebel

- Steve Harley – vocals
- Jim Cregan – guitar, backing vocals
- George Ford – bass guitar, backing vocals
- Duncan Mackay – keyboards, string arrangement on "Black or White"
- Stuart Elliott – drums, percussion
- Lindsey Elliott – percussion

Additional musicians

- Madeline Bell – backing vocals
- Peter Clarke – backing vocals
- Yvonne Keeley – backing vocals
- Barry St. John – backing vocals
- Larry Steele – backing vocals
- Liza Strike – backing vocals
- Leroy Wiggins – backing vocals
- Joy Yates – backing vocals

Production

- Steve Harley – producer
- John Kurlander – engineer
- John Leckie – engineer
- Tony Clark – remix engineer
- Chris Blair – master cutter

== Charts ==
Chart (1975)	Peak position
UK Star Breakers Chart	2
