= Score (Duncan Mackay album) =

Studio album by Duncan Mackay
- Released: 25 March 1977
- Recorded: 1976
- Studio: Scorpio Studios, London
- Genre: Progressive rock
- Length: 41:45
- Label: EMI
- Producer: John Wetton

Duncan Mackay chronology
Chimera (1974)	Score (1977)	Visa (1980)

Score is the second studio album from the British keyboardist Duncan Mackay, released by EMI on 25 March 1977.

== Background ==
Score was produced by John Wetton, who also provides vocals on three of the tracks. Four tracks on the album contain lyrics written by Steve Harley and he also provided vocals on "Time Is No Healer". At the time, Mackay was a member of Steve Harley & Cockney Rebel. Other musicians on Score include Clive Chaman on bass and Andrew McCulloch on drums and percussion. The album was recorded and mixed at Scorpio Studios in London in August and September 1976.

Prior to the album's release, EMI denied claims that Mackay would leave Steve Harley & Cockney Rebel if the album was a commercial success. Instead, Mackay intended to continue playing with the band while also pursuing a solo career including performing his own live concerts.

== Release ==
Score received its first release on CD in 2016. It was released in South Africa through Fresh Music and by Marquee in Japan, the latter release being remastered. In 2019, another Japanese CD remaster was released by Belle Antique, which contained the bonus track "Melange".

== Critical reception ==
Professional ratings
Review scores
Source	Rating
Record Mirror	4/5 stars

Upon its release, Robin Smith of Record Mirror felt that Score gave Mackay "the chance to exercise his talents to the full". He stated, "It's symphonic rock at its best, and unlike many offerings it doesn't sound pretentious. [It's] an album of many changing moods – the real Mackay." Monty Smith of NME summarised, "Score is quite attractive in a Moondog-gy way but is it rock 'n' roll? No. Mackay doesn't go in for Moondog's idiosyncratic canons and although his work is pitched generally more frenetically, the effect of his compositions is strikingly similar to that of the American's, falling somewhere between chaconne and ground bass." He noted that most of the instrumental tracks were "musically interesting", but felt those with vocals were "a mistake". He criticised the lyrics for being "as daft as anything Peter Sinfield ever wrote" and said that the vocal effects by Yvonne Keeley on "Spaghetti Smooch" "sound like a somnambulistic Swingle from a soppy Italian melodrama".

Brian Harrigan of Melody Maker called Mackay a "gifted keyboard[ist] who has never been allowed to show his true worth as a member of Cockney Rebel". He noted that "for the most part he shows admiral retraint", although "at times he succumbs to almost every keyboard player's weakness, an unreasoning desire to show how technically good you are without regard for the actual emotion and feeling of what you're playing". He considered Harley's contributions to the album to be to its "detriment unfortunately" and singled out "Spaghetti Smooch" as the "biggest disaster". He concluded, "On the strength of this album Mackay has every chance of making a solo trip a viable proposition. It's a creditable effort even if it is something of an uneven work." The US music industry trade magazine Record World commented, "Mackay can now take his rightful place alongside Rick Wakeman, Keith Emerson, Patrick Moraz and Vangelis with this adventurous LP." The reviewer noted Wetton and Harley's vocal contributions on the album, but added "it is Mackay who is in the spotlight with just the right amount of excess to make it work on different levels".

== Track listing ==
No.	Title	Writer(s)	Length
1.	"Witches"	Mackay	5:32
2.	"Triptych"	Mackay	3:56
3.	"Spaghetti Smooch"	Mackay, Steve Harley	2:49
4.	"Time Is No Healer"	Mackay, Harley	3:56
5.	"Fugitive"	Mackay	2:23
6.	"Score"	Mackay	7:16
7.	"Pillow Schmillow"	Mackay, Harley	5:01
8.	"Jigaloda"	Mackay	6:02
9.	"No Return"	Mackay, Harley	4:55

2019 Japanese CD bonus track
No.	Title	Writer(s)	Length
10.	"Melange"	Mackay	4:36

== Personnel ==
- Duncan Mackay – keyboards, Yamaha grand piano, Hammond B3, Clavinet D6, Wurlitzer 200, Roland Sequencer, ARP 2600, ARP 2800, ARP 2701, ARP 2100, ARP 2200
- John Wetton – vocals (tracks 3, 7, 9)
- Steve Harley – vocals (track 4)
- Yvonne Keeley – vocal effects
- Clive Chaman – bass, Fender Precision bass
- Andrew McCulloch – drums, percussion
- Mel Collins – flute (track 4)
- Members of the London Symphony Orchestra – orchestra (track 1)
- Wilf Gibson – orchestral arrangement

Production

- John Wetton – producer
- Ray Hendriksen – recording engineer
- Dennis Weinreich – mixing engineer

Other

- Bill Richmond – cover photography
- Fausto Dorelli – cover photography (of Mackay)
- Peter Vernon – inner photography
- Brian Palmer – design
