= If I Had Words =

1977 single by Scott Fitzgerald and Yvonne Keeley

Single by Scott Fitzgerald and Yvonne Keeley
- B-side: "This Time of Year"
- Released: 4 November 1977
- Genre: Pop
- Length: 3:48
- Label: Pepper
- Songwriter: Camille Saint-Saëns
- Producer: Jonathan Hodge

"If I Had Words" is a duet by Scott Fitzgerald and Yvonne Keeley, released as a single in November 1977. It was a top-ten hit in several countries and sold more than one million copies worldwide. The backing was by the St Thomas More Roman Catholic School Choir in London.

== Composition and release ==
The tune was taken from the main theme of the maestoso section of Saint-Saëns' Symphony No.3 in C minor (Symphony with organ) with an added reggae beat. (In the symphony, the theme used in the song is first exposed by the strings section in the second movement, and is played by the organ in the third movement.) The lyrics and arrangement were by Jonathan Hodge, a prolific writer of television jingles and film themes, who also produced the single.

"If I Had Words" topped the charts in the Netherlands and Belgium upon its release and peaked at number three in the UK and Australia. Its popularity in the Netherlands saw it certified platinum. It was also re-recorded by Fitzgerald and Keeley in 2010 and released as a charity single in the Netherlands in support of the Foundation KiKa.

== In popular culture ==
- The song was heard in the 1995 film Babe, sung both by Farmer Hoggett (James Cromwell) and by a trio of mice for a sped-up version. It was also partially incorporated into the film's suite (instrumental). It was also featured in the film's sequel, Babe: Pig in the City.
- The song was covered in German by Angie Gold. Her version, titled "Der schönste Tag" (English translation: "The most beautiful day"), was released as a single in Germany on Polydor in 1978.
- In August 2000, boy band Westlife collaborated with the Vard Sisters and recorded the song for their second studio album Coast To Coast but ultimately did not make it to the final tracklisting.

== Charts ==
=== Weekly charts ===
Chart (1978)	Peak position
Australia (Kent Music Report)	3
Belgium (Ultratop 50 Flanders)	1
Germany (GfK)	25
Ireland (IRMA)	9
Netherlands (Dutch Top 40)	1
Netherlands (Single Top 100)	1
New Zealand (Recorded Music NZ)	8
Rhodesia (Lyons Maid)	10
UK Singles (Official Charts)	3

Chart (2010)	Peak position
Netherlands (Single Top 100)	65

=== Year-end charts ===
Chart (1978)	Position
Belgium (Ultratop Flanders)	12
Netherlands (Dutch Top 40)	4
Netherlands (Single Top 100)	2

== Sales and certifications ==
Region	Certification	Certified units/sales
Netherlands (NVPI)	Platinum	150,000^{^}
^{^} Shipments figures based on certification alone.
