= White, White Dove =

1976 song by Steve Harley & Cockney Rebel

Single by Steve Harley & Cockney Rebel

from the album Timeless Flight
- B-side: "Throw Your Soul Down Here"
- Released: 6 February 1976
- Genre: Rock
- Length: 5:37 (album version); 4:15 (edited version)
- Label: EMI
- Songwriter: Steve Harley
- Producer: Steve Harley

Steve Harley & Cockney Rebel singles chronology
"Black or White" (1975)	"White, White Dove" (1976)	"Here Comes the Sun" (1976)

"White, White Dove" is a song by the British rock band Steve Harley & Cockney Rebel, released on 6 February 1976 as the second and final single from their fourth studio album Timeless Flight. The song was written and produced by Harley.

== Background ==
As the second single to be released from Timeless Flight, "White, White Dove" followed the commercial failure of "Black or White", which failed to enter the UK Singles Chart when released in November 1975. "White, White Dove" was released shortly after Timeless Flight, but despite the album's top 20 success in the UK, "White, White Dove" also failed to reach the UK top 50. It did however reach number six in the UK Star Breakers Chart on 13 March 1976.

"White, White Dove" was recorded at Trident Studios in London, and remixed and cut at Abbey Road Studios, London. The song features Lindsay Elliott, the younger brother of the band's drummer Stuart Elliott, on congas.

== Release ==
"White, White Dove" was released by EMI Records as a 7-inch single in the UK, Germany, Belgium, Portugal and Australia. The UK promotional and Australian releases featured an edit of "White, White Dove", which cut the album version down by over a minute.

The single's B-side, "Throw Your Soul Down Here", was written and produced by Harley. It was exclusive to the single and remained so until it was included as a bonus track on the 1991 EMI CD release of Timeless Flight. The song was recorded at AIR Studios, London, after the Timeless Flight sessions. It features Herbie Flowers on double bass and B. A. Robertson on piano.

== Promotion ==
To promote the single, the band performed the song live on the UK ITV music programme Supersonic.

== Critical reception ==
Upon its release as a single, Ray Fox-Cumming of Record Mirror & Disc predicted the song would be a hit. He commented, "I was not convinced that this was the best track to be single number two from Timeless Flight, but now, edited down, it does make sense. It's still not one of Harley's strongest songs, but the funky guitar patterns, well-paced vocal and sterling production all help to make it man enough for the job of chart-breaching." Caroline Coon of Melody Maker was positive of the song in her review, but felt it had "less chart potential" than "Black or White". She wrote, "This is a subtly different mix from the album track. Slightly edgier, just emphasising the anger which gapes like an infinite black pit under the funky, wildly ecstatic percussion and popping bass lines. Not only is this sound supremely confident, swimming straight up the current Seventies feel, pitched right on the pulse of what is relevant in music today, but Harley's whole tone is thrusting forward in the direction to where sound will be in the Eighties." Mick Farren of the NME believed that the song "sound[s] like Springsteen with a little more of Bob Dylan's phrasing". He also noted how the "fast, jumping, almost Neo-Temps drumming leads into a bizarro psychedelic guitar solo".

The Lincolnshire Standard described it as "another highly commercial single from Cockney Rebel, led by the talented Steve Harley". Roxana Read of the Neath Guardian commented, "Bearing olive branches, peace and contentment, Harley is back with 'White, White Dove'. Perhaps this one will get no further than 'Black or White'. Certainly not a 'Judy Teen'. Excellent, though." A reviewer for St Andrews Citizen believed it would be a "medium hit" and held "greater hopes" for it commercially compared to the previous single, "Black or White". They did not consider it to be "as strong" as Cockney Rebel's earlier work, but noted "it has a certain lyrical quality and an angry, biting edge to it". They highlighted the "superb production" and the "punchy and straight ahead instrumentation, with a funkified bass guitar line soaring over a restrained but vicious percussion section", and believed Harley "vocalises well", although his lyrics are "a bit on the pretentious side". Jim Green of Trouser Press noted the B-side, "Throw Your Soul Down Here", to be "a moody entreaty".

In a review of Timeless Flight, Stewart Parker, for his "High Pop" column in The Irish Times, criticised the song for being "aimless and tuneless". Graham Scott of The Evening Times (Little Falls, New York), considered the song to be musically similar to the Rolling Stones' "Sympathy for the Devil". He added, "What it's all about I'm not sure, but the music's certainly good." In a 2003 review of Timeless Flight, Martin Aston of Q felt the song's "borderline-poppy chorus is scuppered by skittish, borderline-jazz rock flourishes".

== Track listing ==
7-inch single (UK and Europe)

1. "White, White Dove" – 5:37
2. "Throw Your Soul Down Here" – 4:04

7-inch single (UK promo and Australia)

1. "White, White Dove" (Edited Version) – 4:15
2. "Throw Your Soul Down Here" – 4:04

== Personnel ==
White, White Dove

- Steve Harley – vocals, guitar
- Jim Cregan – guitar, backing vocals
- Duncan Mackay – keyboards
- George Ford – bass, backing vocals
- Stuart Elliott – drums
- Lindsay Elliott – congas

Throw Your Soul Down Here

- Steve Harley – vocals, acoustic guitar
- Herbie Flowers – double bass
- B. A. Robertson – piano
- Stuart Elliott – drums
- Yvonne Keeley – backing vocals

Production

- Steve Harley – producer
- Peter Kelsey – engineer on "White, White Dove"
- Tony Clark – engineer and remix engineer on "White, White Dove"
- Chris Blair – mastering on "White, White Dove"

== Charts ==
Chart (1976)	Peak position
UK Star Breakers Chart	6
