= Roll the Dice (Steve Harley song) =

1978 song by Steve Harley

Single by Steve Harley

from the album Hobo with a Grin
- B-side: "Waiting"
- Released: 14 July 1978
- Genre: Pop, rock
- Length: 3:31 (album version); 3:12 (single version)
- Label: EMI Records
- Songwriters: Steve Harley; Jo Partridge
- Producer: Michael J. Jackson

Steve Harley singles chronology
"The Best Years of Our Lives (live)" (1977)	"Roll the Dice" (1978)	"Someone's Coming" (1979)

"Roll the Dice" is a song by English singer-songwriter Steve Harley, released on 14 July 1978 as the lead single from his debut solo album, Hobo with a Grin. The song was written by Harley and Jo Partridge, and produced by Michael J. Jackson.

== Background ==
Harley began working on his debut solo album, Hobo with a Grin, in 1977, after disbanding Cockney Rebel. While most of the album was recorded in London, "Roll the Dice" was one of two tracks to be recorded and mixed at Sunset Sound in Los Angeles. It was the only track on Hobo with a Grin not to be produced by Harley, but the album's assistant producer, Michael J. Jackson.

"Roll the Dice" was released in July 1978 as the first single from Hobo with a Grin, a week before the release of the album. Despite strong airplay, the song was not a commercial success and failed to make an appearance in the UK Top 75, although it did peak at number 76 in Record Business magazine's Singles Chart based on both sales and airplay. The song was included on BBC Radio 1's "Featured 40", Radio Luxembourg's "Top 40", Capital's "B List", Piccadilly's "Hit 30", Downtown's "Featured 50" and Beacon's "B List". It also received play on BRMB and Hallam FM, BBC Radio Tees, Trent FM, Radio Victory, Swansea Sound and Plymouth Gold. The song peaked at No. 18 on the Radio & Record News Top 30 Airplay Singles chart for the week ending 11 August 1978. In light of its radio play, Harley was surprised by its failure in the UK. He told Sounds in 1979, "I still can't believe that 'Roll the Dice' wasn't a top five hit in England. I was flabbergasted by its failure. It was the most played single of my career on British radio and yet it didn't even get into the top 50. It was played by many stations more often than 'Make Me Smile' and that was a number one single that sold over half a million."

"Roll the Dice" was released in the United States in August 1978. At the time, The Denver Post reported how Harley disdained the song's commercial potential in the United States. Harley commented, "It's 'poppy', with that Fleetwood Mac-ish shuffle. 'Catchy' is not a good thing in this country. The more AM radio I hear, the more convinced I am that the goal is to bore."

== Release ==
"Roll the Dice" was released on 7-inch vinyl by EMI Records in the UK, Germany, Spain, Australia and New Zealand, and by Capitol Records in North America. For its release as a single, an edited version of the song was made, which shortened the song by approximately half a minute. The B-side, "Waiting", was written and produced by Harley. The track was exclusive to the single and has not appeared on any other release since. It was originally intended for inclusion on Hobo with a Grin, but was dropped from the final track listing. In the UK, Germany and Spain, the single was released with colour picture sleeves. In the UK, the first 20,000 copies of the single featured the sleeve.

Following its original release as a single, and on Hobo with a Grin, the song has since appeared on various Steve Harley compilations, including 1981's Collection, 1992's Make Me Smile – The Best of Steve Harley and Cockney Rebel, 1996's Premium Gold Collection 1998's More Than Somewhat – The Very Best of Steve Harley, 1999's The Cream of Steve Harley & Cockney Rebel, and 2006's The Cockney Rebel – A Steve Harley Anthology.

== Promotion ==
A music video was filmed to promote the single. It was filmed over a two-day period in the Bakersfield Desert, California. Shot on 35mm film, videos were also produced at the same time for "I Wish It Would Rain" and "Amerika the Brave", both from Hobo with a Grin. The single was promoted by a full-page, black-and-white advert in the 22 July 1978 issue of New Musical Express.

== Critical reception ==
Upon its release, Philip Hall of Record Mirror considered "Roll the Dice" to be "strongly Americanised" and "very smooth, very polished", with Harley's vocal being "less distinctive than usual". He added, "It's got a hook line which I can't stop singing, and which you should give a listen to." Gary Bushell of Sounds commented, "Soulish MOR minus the Harley inflections. Is this a 'mature artist' approach?" Mike Pryce of the Worcester Evening News noted that it is a "chirrupy song with a title like it should be hard rock, but [is] in fact dead straight pop". Harry Doherty of Melody Maker was critical of the song, describing it as "poor" and noting that the "singing drifts aimlessly into middle age". He added, "Whatever pop sensibilities Harley once possessed, they have finally deserted him". Sex Pistols vocalist Johnny Rotten, as guest reviewer for NME, called it "cheap EMI soul for the dustbins" and added that Harley "fails yet again".

In the US, music trade magazine Billboard listed the song under their "Top Single Picks" section in August 1978, under the heading "Recommended Pop". Record World praised the song as "highly-polished power pop, with a strong melody, well performed by guitars and keyboards". Cash Box listed the single as one "to watch". They commented on Partridge's "strong guitar work", Harley's "good singing" and felt the song was "suited to Top 40 lists".

In a review of Hobo with a Grin, G. Brown of The Denver Post commented, "If Harley is due for a hit single, 'Roll the Dice' could fill the bill nicely. Led by a catchy keyboard introduction, the song boasts a great hook and a youthful Harley vocal." In a review of the 2008 compilation The Best of Steve Harley & Cockney Rebel, Dave Thompson of AllMusic commented that the song "deserve[s] a fresh hearing."

== Track listing ==
7-inch single

1. "Roll the Dice" – 3:12
2. "Waiting" – 2:52

7-inch single (US promo)

1. "Roll the Dice" (Stereo) – 3:12
2. "Roll the Dice" (Mono) – 3:12

== Personnel ==
"Roll the Dice"

- Steve Harley – vocals
- Michael McDonald, Bill Champlin, Rosemary Butler, Bobby Kimball, Tom Kelley – backing vocals
- Bill Payne – acoustic piano
- Duncan Mackay – electric piano, harpsichord, synthesizer
- Jo Partridge – electric guitars
- Fred Tackett – acoustic guitar
- Bob Glaub – bass
- Rick Shlosser – drums
- Michael J. Jackson – percussion

Production

- Michael J. Jackson – producer, additional production, mixing
- John Haeny – engineer
- James Isaacson – engineer, remixing, additional recording
- Paul Black – assistant engineer
- Ken Perry – mastering
- Steve Harley – producer of "Waiting"

== Charts ==
Chart (1978)	Peak position
UK Top 30 Airplay Singles (Radio & Record News)	18
UK The Singles Chart (Record Business)	76
UK The Airplay Guide (Record Business)	8
