= More Than Somewhat – The Very Best of Steve Harley =

Compilation album by Steve Harley
- Released: 23 March 1998
- Genre: Rock
- Length: 71:43
- Label: EMI

Steve Harley chronology
Poetic Justice (1996)	More Than Somewhat – The Very Best of Steve Harley (1998)	The Cream of Steve Harley & Cockney Rebel (1999)

Alternative Cover
- 2000 Disky Best of the 70's re-issue

More Than Somewhat – The Very Best of Steve Harley is a compilation album by Steve Harley, released by EMI on 23 March 1998. It features sixteen tracks recorded by Cockney Rebel, Steve Harley & Cockney Rebel and Harley as a solo artist, spanning from Cockney Rebel's 1973 debut album The Human Menagerie to Harley's 1996 solo album Poetic Justice. At least one song from each studio album is included, with the exception of Harley's 1979 album The Candidate.

More Than Somewhat – The Very Best of Steve Harley was the first Steve Harley/Cockney Rebel compilation to be released in the UK since 1992's Make Me Smile – The Best of Steve Harley and Cockney Rebel. It gave Harley his first appearance in the UK Albums Chart since Steve Harley & Cockney Rebel's 1977 album Face to Face: A Live Recording. The compilation reached number 82 and remained in the top 100 for two weeks.

== Background ==
Harley was involved in choosing the track listing for the compilation and also wrote the sleeve notes for it. Speaking of his involvement, he told The Birmingham Post in 1998,

"[EMI] certainly asked me but I'm not so overconfident these days that I'm just going to tell them what [the track listing] will be. It's the band's 25th anniversary and those tracks will be taken from 11 albums so I want it to be special and mean something, so the fax machine has been quite hot between me and the marketing man. I'm not taking the blame and I certainly won't take all the credit. But I have done it, and I've written the sleeve notes which was the hardest part, writing about yourself. I've been canvassing the fan club to see what they think should be on it, and a couple of friends, people whose judgement I trusted. It turned out pretty well how I intended it in the first place. It'll be the hit singles and a few album tracks."

== Promotion ==
Coinciding with the compilation's release was Harley's 1998 "Stripped to the Bare Bones" tour. This tour was Harley's first using his newly developed acoustic format. Accompanied by instrumentalist Nick Pynn, the pair played over a hundred dates that year across the UK and Europe.

== Release ==
More Than Somewhat was released by EMI on CD in the UK and Europe on 23 March 1998. The album received its first digital release on 1 March 2003 and was re-issued on CD by Phantom Import Distribution/EMI Music Distribution in 2004.

In 2000, the compilation was re-issued across Europe by Disky under the new title Best of the 70's. Another re-issue by Disky followed in 2005, but in the Netherlands only, as The Ultra Selection.

== Critical reception ==
Professional ratings
Review scores
Source	Rating
The Virgin Encyclopedia of 70s Music	3/4 stars
Walthamstow Guardian	3/5 stars

Upon its release, Bob Eborall of the Ealing Leader wrote, "A compilation from the artist who has been touring the country including 'Come Up and See Me'. Steve has also written the sleeve notes, making it a must for his fans. He is still an artist to reckon with." Neil McKay of Sunday Life stated, "Great glam singles from his brief 70s heyday succumb to later navel gazing material." Nik Stephens of the Walthamstow Guardian described the compilation as "gather[ing] together the finest moments of Harley and Cockney Rebel from the 70s period to more studied recent material". He noted that the 1970s material is "all delivered in Harley's eccentric drawl, revealing a surprising similarity with Jarvis Cocker's mannerisms". Music Week concluded that the compilation was "best left to die-hard fans", with the reviewer remarking, "It is still a pleasure to hear some of the tracks on this compilation, but Harley's back catalogue is best visited selectively. 'Make Me Smile', 'Judy Teen' and 'Mr. Soft' sound just as catchy, in an irretrievably Seventies kind of way, but Harley's naive rendition starts to grate fairly soon."

== Track listing ==
No.	Title	Writer(s)	Length
1.	"Make Me Smile (Come Up and See Me)"	Steve Harley	4:00
2.	"(Love) Compared with You"	Harley	4:19
3.	"Judy Teen"	Harley	3:40
4.	"Mr Raffles (Man, It Was Mean)"	Harley	4:33
5.	"Mr Soft"	Harley	3:18
6.	"Sebastian"	Harley	6:55
7.	"That's My Life In Your Hands"	Harley, Hugh Nicholson	3:49
8.	"Here Comes the Sun"	George Harrison	2:56
9.	"All Men are Hungry"	Harley	4:46
10.	"Roll the Dice"	Harley, Jo Partridge	3:25
11.	"The Best Years of Our Lives"	Harley	5:44
12.	"Star for a Week (Dino)"	Harley	4:36
13.	"Rain in Venice"	Harley, Robin Le Mesurier	4:50
14.	"The Last Time I Saw You"	Harley	5:36
15.	"Psychomodo"	Harley	4:02
16.	"Irresistible" (Remix)	Harley	5:12

== Personnel ==
Production

- Steve Harley – producer (tracks 1–5, 7–9, 11–16)
- Alan Parsons – producer (tracks 1, 3–5, 11, 15)
- Neil Harrison – producer (track 6)
- Michael J. Jackson – producer (track 10)
- Mickie Most – producer (tracks 12–13, 16)
- Stuart Breed – remixer (track 16)

Other

- Steve Harley – liner notes

== Charts ==
Chart (1998)	Peak position
UK Albums Chart	82
