= St Thomas More Language College =

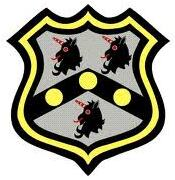

Location
- Cadogan Street; Chelsea, London, SW3 2QS; England; 51°29′35″N 0°09′43″W

Information
- Type: Voluntary aided school
- Motto: Serving God, Striving for Excellence
- Religious affiliation: Roman Catholic
- Established: 1885
- Founder: Thomas More
- Local authority: Kensington & Chelsea
- Department for Education URN: 100502 Tables
- Ofsted: Reports
- Head teacher: Trevor Papworth
- Gender: Coeducational
- Age: 11 to 16
- Houses: Sherwin, Mayne, Campion, Fisher & Howard
- Colours: Green, black
- Website: https://www.stmlc.co.uk/

St Thomas More Language College is a Roman Catholic secondary school in the Royal Borough of Kensington and Chelsea. It is named after Thomas More who was beheaded by King Henry VIII when Lord Chancellor. Saint Thomas More lived in the Chelsea borough which is where the school is now located.

Education for boys and girls has been provided at the school since 1845. The first foundation in 1885 was for 200 pupils and the school has been in existence since that time. The Sisters of Mercy, who ran a boarding school, decided to move from the site in 1954 so that the school could be modernised to accommodate 249 pupils.

The school is situated in the middle of Chelsea, a short walk from Sloane Square, and is surrounded by a wide variety of galleries and museums. Many of the buildings have now been supplemented by modern buildings which house all the facilities for a mixed, comprehensive school. The school gained Language College specialist status in September 2004.

St Thomas More RC School achieved Specialist status as a Language College in 2004. There are 37 different language backgrounds in college. These languages range across Europe, South America and Africa. The largest contingents are Portuguese, Spanish, Filipino and Eritrean.

== Achievements ==
In 1977 the school choir provided the backing vocals for the hit song If I Had Words performed by Scott Fitzgerald and Yvonne Keeley, which reached Number 1 in the Netherlands, Number 3 in the UK, Number 9 in Ireland and Number 24 in Australia.
