= Ballerina (Prima Donna) =

1983 song by Steve Harley

Single by Steve Harley (Steve Harley & Cockney Rebel)
- B-side: "Face to Face" (7"); "Sebastian" (12")
- Released: 29 July 1983
- Genre: Pop
- Length: 4:57 (full version); 4:11 (single version)
- Label: Stiletto Records
- Songwriter(s): Mike Batt
- Producer(s): Mike Batt

Steve Harley (Steve Harley & Cockney Rebel) singles chronology
"I Can't Even Touch You" (1982)	"Ballerina (Prima Donna)" (1983)	"Make Me Smile (Come Up and See Me) (re-issue)" (1983)

Alternative Cover
- 12-inch cover of "Ballerina (Prima Donna)"

"Ballerina (Prima Donna)" is a song recorded by English singer-songwriter Steve Harley, released by Stiletto Records as a non-album single on 29 July 1983. The song, written and produced by Mike Batt, reached number 51 in the UK Singles Chart.

== Writing ==
Mike Batt was inspired to write "Ballerina (Prima Donna)" after what he described as a "very short but fabulous fling" with a ballerina from the Royal Ballet. In his 2024 autobiography The Closest Thing to Crazy, he recalled,

"One day I rang her from Germany, where I was doing a TV show, and she was with someone else, giggling and teasing me – probably, in hindsight, just one of the ballet guys – but it wound me up. So I wrote her a short but polite goodbye note followed by a sad but slightly self-pitying song called 'Ballerina (Prima Donna)'. Years later, we met again and I apologised for using her as song-fodder. She told me she'd been flattered that I cared."

== Recording ==
In 1983, Stiletto Records approached Harley with the opportunity of recording a new version of Cockney Rebel's 1973 single "Sebastian", which had been a big hit in continental Europe but not the UK. Although Harley initially turned down the offer, he then reconsidered on the condition that Stiletto assigned a decent budget to the project and brought in a "top-line producer". Harley suggested an acquaintance, Mike Batt, for the role, as he knew Batt could "handle an orchestra" and would "make a record that I would be proud of". The pair subsequently recorded "Sebastian" and, during the sessions, Batt presented Harley with a newly-written track, "Ballerina (Prima Donna)", and offered him the opportunity to record it. According to Harley, Batt wrote the song with him in mind. In an interview on Scotland Today, Harley revealed, "I've known Mike a few years, never working with him though. I still write nearly everything I record, but Mike wrote this song. And when he sang it to me on the piano, he sang it like me, and I fell for it, I couldn't help it, and so we recorded it."

Both "Ballerina (Prima Donna)" and "Sebastian" were recorded in the spring of 1983 at Lansdowne Studios and Abbey Road Studios, London, with Batt as the producer. "Ballerina (Prima Donna)" ultimately replaced "Sebastian" as the intended A-side and the single was released on 29 July 1983 by Stiletto Records. It gave Harley his first UK chart action in four years, peaking at number 51 in the UK Singles Chart and remaining in the top 100 for six weeks.

In 1985, Harley was more dismissive of the song, calling it "crap" and "not really me", and adding, "I needed a hit and I thought [Batt] might be able to supply me with one." Later in 2013, Harley described the song as "a bit cheesy" but added, "It has a bitter, accusing air, written by my good mate Mike Batt at a time of low self-esteem (wouldn't have lasted long!)"

== Release ==
"Ballerina (Prima Donna)" was released by Stiletto Records on 7-inch and 12-inch single in the UK and Germany. RCA handled the single's marketing and distribution. The single's sleeve credited the song solely to Steve Harley, whereas the vinyl credited it to Steve Harley & Cockney Rebel.

The B-side, "Face to Face", written and produced by Harley, is exclusive to the single. The song was written and recorded in the studio as a 16-track demo. Harley recalled in 1985, "That was a demo. We never actually re-recorded it. It [was] written and recorded in about three hours. I wrote it in the studio, and recorded it there and then." The 12-inch releases of the single included the new version of "Sebastian". Harley said of the version in 1985, "I didn't mind it at all. All it strictly is is Mike's interpretation of my song."

== Music video ==
The song's music video was filmed at the Prince Edward Theatre, Old Compton Street, London. It depicts the story of a ballerina performing at a theatre, where her boyfriend (Harley), who was in the audience watching her performance, then catches her with another man backstage afterwards, causing him to confront her in the dressing room. Harley leaves and in distress the ballerina hands back the bouquet of flowers given to her by her secret lover, and tearfully watches Harley's shadow disappear as he leaves down the stairs. Harley leaves the theatre and calls a taxi, while the ballerina sits on an empty stage in sadness. Other segments in the video feature the ballerina performing on stage and close-up shots of Harley singing the song's first two chorus sections. The video was created in similar style to a film and featured opening and ending credits.

Harley said of the video in 1985, "We [did] a really good video which you wouldn't have seen. There's no where you can play a video until [the single]'s in the top 50. It's a very good video, real clever, I liked it a lot. Had it been a hit record, and the video shown often on Top of the Pops and that, I think it would have been an award-winning video."

In 1986, Harley would return to the Prince Edward Theatre, where he auditioned on stage for the role of the phantom in the upcoming Andrew Lloyd Webber musical The Phantom of the Opera. Although Harley was given the starring role, he was later replaced by Michael Crawford.

== Promotion ==
Harley appeared on the South West TV show Freeze Frame, where he performed the song. He was accompanied on stage by the 16 year old ballerina Maria Roselli, who made her television debut on the show, performing ballet in the background during the song's performance. Roselli told the Aldershot News & Mail in 1983, "I'm a fan [of Steve Harley]. I didn't really know of him until I heard him, but I thought the song was very nice." During Harley's appearance on Scotland Today, a clip from an alternative music video was shown.

"Ballerina (Prima Donna)" was performed live by Steve Harley & Cockney Rebel on two occasions around the time of its release. The band performed it at their London concert in June 1983 and at the Reading Festival in August 1983. In February 2013, the song received its first live performance in 30 years during the band's concert at Buxton, and the song was also included on select dates during the band's November 2013 tour.

== Critical reception ==
Upon its release, Simon Mares of the Reading Evening Post wrote, "This song is written, arranged and produced by Mike Batt and I have to say you can just about make out Steve's talent as a singer struggling through - but it's a difficult job and I'd rather hear his self-penned songs." Simon Tebbutt of Record Mirror commented, "The last living survivor of the Titanic disaster with a melodramatic bargain basement Eagles-meets-Metal Mickey type song. Bound to be Terry Wogan's record of the week." Charles Shaar Murray of New Musical Express wrote, "Harley never quite captured Dylan's winge and whimsy as well as Ian Hunter, but his music is now so appallingly dreary that it's quite possible that he could do exceptionally well in the States at last." Dave Dickson of Kerrang! noted Batt "always had an excellent ear for a nifty pop tune", but had doubts the song would "scor[e] much impression on the charts all the same". He concluded, "If pop songs were ranked like cricket teams this would be a middle-order batsman." Dave Henderson of Sounds listed the single under the "ugly pop" category and described it as "Steve Harley on a slice of embarrassment that's well worth a yawn".

== Track listing ==
7-inch single

1. "Ballerina" – 4:11
2. "Face to Face" – 3:29

12-inch single

1. "Ballerina" – 4:57
2. "Sebastian" – 4:06

== Personnel ==
Production

- Mike Batt – producer and arranger on "Ballerina" and "Sebastian"
- Steve Harley – producer of "Face to Face"

Other

- BBB Design – 7-inch picture sleeve artwork
- Terry Walker – 7-inch picture sleeve photography
- Amanda Lord at Freddie's – 7-inch picture sleeve model

== Charts ==
Chart (1983)	Peak position
UK Singles Chart (The Official Charts Company)	51
