= Freedom's Prisoner =

1979 song by Steve Harley

Single by Steve Harley

from the album The Candidate
- B-side: "One More Time"
- Released: 12 October 1979
- Genre: Rock
- Length: 3:51
- Label: EMI
- Songwriters: Steve Harley; Jimmy Horowitz
- Producers: Steve Harley; Jimmy Horowitz

Steve Harley singles chronology
"Someone's Coming" (1979)	"Freedom's Prisoner" (1979)	"Make Me Smile (Come Up and See Me) (re-issue)" (1981)

"Freedom's Prisoner" is a song by British singer-songwriter Steve Harley, which was released in 1979 as the only single from his second solo album The Candidate. The song, which was written and produced by Harley and Jimmy Horowitz, reached number 58 in the UK Singles Chart.

== Background ==
Harley wrote and recorded "Freedom's Prisoner" and the rest of the material for The Candidate in 1979, after moving back to the UK from Los Angeles. Both "Freedom's Prisoner" and The Candidate were released in October 1979, but the album was not a commercial success. "Freedom's Prisoner" reached number 58 in the UK Singles Chart and remained in the top 75 for three weeks. The song received strong airplay on UK radio and was BBC Radio 1's "station pick" for the week commencing 1 October 1979. The station's DJ Kid Jensen also made it his "Single of the Week". Although the song subsequently only achieved breakout rotation on Radio 1, it was added to the main playlists of various Independent Local Radio stations, including BRMB, Trent FM, Radio Tees, Picadilly, Swansea Sound and Plymouth Gold.

Speaking to the Daily Mirror in 1979, Harley spoke of his predictions for the song, stating, "I reckon the single is a top ten record". The limited commercial success of both the single and album resulted in EMI Records dropping Harley, leaving him without a record deal.

"Freedom's Prisoner" was recorded and mastered at Abbey Road Studios, and mixed at Morgan Studios. The song features backing vocals from the English Chorale, who were directed by Robert Howes. Harley had asked Horowitz to find a choir for the plainsong parts, and in turn Horowitz booked the choir.

== Release ==
"Freedom's Prisoner" was released by EMI Records on 7-inch vinyl in the UK, Ireland and the Netherlands. The B-side, "One More Time", was taken from The Candidate, and was written by Harley, and produced by Harley and Horowitz.

== Promotion ==
A music video was filmed to promote the single. Harley also performed the song on British children's television series Tiswas.

The song has been performed live by Steve Harley and Cockney Rebel on numerous occasions. It was performed at the band's 1984 concert at the Camden Palace, London, which was filmed for TV and released on the VHS Live from London in 1985. When the band returned to touring in 1989, the song was occasionally included in the set-list.

== Critical reception ==
Upon its release, Pauline McLeod of the Daily Mirror described "Freedom's Prisoner" as a "raunchy rock 'n' roller with lots of gutsy vocals". Simon Ludgate of Record Mirror called it as a "great single" and added, "Corny but fun, Dr Zhivago-style Russian chorus and danceable melody clicks very nicely. That instant hook is just what Harley needs to get himself noticed again." Dave Murray of the Reading Evening Post considered "Freedom's Prisoner" to be "one of Harley's better singles, and likely to do well in the charts". Mike Pryce of the Worcester Evening News wrote, "Going to be an enormous hit for Steve. Heard it on the car radio the other day and apart from making ideal motoring music, it's totally irresistible."

Paul Sexton of Record Mirror wrote, "The hook comes before the vocals, with a call out melody. Downhill from there, but Harley's return may still be timely." Chris Difford of Squeeze, as guest reviewer for Smash Hits, remarked, "David Essex would turn in his Rolls if he heard this one. A contract filler perhaps." Paul Rambali of New Musical Express commented, "By the time he finally decides what his music is supposed to be it's over anyway. It's too late Harley, your time is up. Suitable for airplay and not much else." Jim Ward of the Harborough Mail stated, "Contract filler – I hope" and added it was a "disappointing return for the talented but wayward Harley".

In a review of The Candidate, Gary Paul of Bedfordshire on Sunday described the song as "a non-stop, medium rock toe-tapper which has a lot going for it". In a retrospective review of the album, Dave Thompson of AllMusic described the song as "Harley's finest 45 in half a decade", and noted the song's "tidal wave of intriguing lyrics", "captivating chorus" and "a dynamic that was pure Psychomodo". He added, "When 'Freedom's Prisoner' single hit the airwaves, it would have taken a lot to convince the longtime fan that the man hadn't resparked all his old glories again, and was about to embark upon a musical journey as scintillating, and as fascinating, as that which launched him in the first place. It was also a total fluke, as the accompanying album proved itself to be little more than a clutch of substandard songs, glued together by alluring production alone."

== Track listing ==
7-inch single

1. "Freedom's Prisoner" – 3:51
2. "One More Time" – 4:26

== Personnel ==
- Steve Harley – vocals
- Jo Partridge, Phil Palmer, Nico Ramsden – guitar
- John Giblin – bass
- Stuart Elliott – drums
- The English Chorale – choir backing vocals
- Robert Howes – choir director

Production

- Steve Harley, Jimmy Horowitz – producers
- Haydn Bendall, Tony Clark – engineers
- Chris Blair – mastering
- Mike Hedges – mixing

== Charts ==
Chart (1979)	Peak position
UK The Singles Chart (Record Business)	59
UK Airplay Guide (Record Business)	40
UK Singles Chart (OCC)	58
