= Live from London (Steve Harley & Cockney Rebel video) =

Video by Steve Harley & Cockney Rebel
- Released: 1985
- Recorded: 1984
- Genre: Concert Performance Video
- Length: 60 minutes
- Label: Trilion Pictures Ltd./Castle Communications Plc.
- Director: Marc Over
- Producer: Philip Goodhand-Tait

Steve Harley & Cockney Rebel chronology
| Live from London (1985) | The Come Back, All is Forgiven Tour: Live (1989) |

Live from London is a live concert video by the British rock band Steve Harley & Cockney Rebel, filmed during a concert in 1984. It was the band's first release on VHS, being released in 1985.

== Background ==
After a Christmas tour in 1981, Steve Harley & Cockney Rebel would not embark on another tour again until 1989. However, the band did perform three odd shows during 1983 and 1984, including the Reading Festival in 1983 and the Camden Palace in London on 14 December 1984. The latter show was filmed by Trilion Pictures Ltd for a one-hour TV broadcast, with Marc Over as the director and Philip Goodhand-Tait as the producer. It was first broadcast on TV on 5 January 1985 via the London ITV channel. It was then released on VHS by Castle Communications later in the year. The concert was the last the band would perform until 1989 and was the debut performance for band's new violinist/guitarist Barry Wickens.

After its completion, Harley produced a demo tape from the concert footage, highlighting six of the newer songs from the set, in the attempt to generate record company interest and gain a new recording contract. This proved successful when he signed a five-album recording contract with Mickie Most's label RAK in 1985.

== Release ==
Live from London was released on VHS through Castle Communications Plc in 1985. Despite the back cover listing 16 tracks in total, the last two "Sweet Dreams" and "(I Believe) Love's a Prima Donna" did not actually appear on the release, but were performed during the concert and were included in the TV broadcast. In 2001, the concert was given its first DVD release through CP Entertainment as part of their 'Legends of Rock' series. The footage was digitally remastered for the DVD. CP Entertainment released two different editions of the DVD, one of which was a 'Collectors Edition' and featured different artwork, though both editions shared the same catalogue number. The Collectors Edition DVD had the bonus feature of being a DVD Plus flip-disc, meaning that an audio CD version of the concert was placed on the other side of the DVD disc.

On 26 February 2007, Live from London was given a new DVD release through Rhino. Another DVD release followed on 11 June 2012, when it was released by the Store for Music. This version of the concert came with a bonus feature of a previously unseen photo gallery, featuring photographs taken from the same concert. On 24 March 2017, the Store for Music released the concert on CD and as an audio download.

== Critical reception ==
Professional ratings
Review scores
| Source | Rating |
|---|---|
| The Digital Fix | 4/10 stars |

Of the 2001 DVD release of Live from London, Mike Sutton of the website The Digital Fix commented: "Considering that Steve Harley wrote one of the defining songs of the seventies - the sublime "(Come Up And See Me) Make Me Smile" - it's fair to say that I had fairly positive expectations of this concert DVD. While these weren't totally dashed, I have to admit that I wasn't particularly impressed. The music isn't bad at all but the presentation of the DVD is disappointing. The songs are generally of a pretty high standard, although these live versions aren't a patch on the original records. The quality of the picture is mediocre at best. Although this release is superior to some of the others released by CP, it's certainly not an essential purchase. Even fans of Steve Harley are likely to be a little disappointed by the poor visual quality of the concert."

== Track listing ==
=== VHS track listing ===
1. "Live from London - Title Music" (Spaniel Music)
2. "Here Comes the Sun" (George Harrison)
3. "I Can't Even Touch You" (Steve Harley)
4. "Freedom's Prisoner" (Harley, Jimmy Horowitz)
5. "Judy Teen" (Harley)
6. "I Just Wanna Be a Star" (Harley)
7. "Irresistible" (Harley)
8. "Sebastian" (Harley)
9. "Riding the Waves" (Harley)
10. "Promises" (Harley)
11. "Mr Soft" (Harley)
12. "Sling It!" (Harley)
13. "Make Me Smile" (Harley)
14. "Tumbling Down" (Harley)
15. "Sweet Dreams" (Harley)
16. "Psychomodo"(Harley)
17. "(I Believe) Love's a Prima Donna" (Harley)
- Though listed on the VHS, "Sweet Dreams" and "(I Believe) Love's a Prima Donna" were not included in the footage. However, when the footage aired in Europe as a television special, "Sweet Dreams"/"Psychomodo" and "(I Believe) Love's a Prima Donna" were included. Footage of these 3 songs has since surfaced on YouTube.

=== DVD track listing ===
1. "Here Comes the Sun"
2. "I Can't Even Touch You"
3. "Freedom's Prisoner"
4. "Judy Teen"
5. "I Just Wanna Be a Star"
6. "Irresistible"
7. "Sebastian"
8. "Riding the Waves"
9. "Promises"
10. "Mr Soft"
11. "Sling It!"
12. "Make Me Smile"
13. "Tumbling Down"

== Personnel ==
Cockney Rebel

- Steve Harley – lead vocals, guitar
- Rick Driscoll – lead guitar
- Alan Darby – lead guitar
- Barry Wickens – violin
- Ian Keller (née Nice - Harley's brother) – keyboards
- Kevin Powell – bass guitar
- Lindsay Elliott – drums
- Martin Jay – backing vocals
- Suzanne Murphy – backing vocals

Concert crew

- Roy Wood – sound engineer
- Mick Gibbs – sound recording
- Steve Harley – sound mix
- Steve Hills – sound mix
- Scott Thompson – monitor engineer
- Dave Thomas – backline technician
- Clive Davies – lighting designer
- Leanne Bogen – graphics

Video production team

- Marc Over - director
- Philip Goodhand-Tait – producer
- Trilion Pictures Ltd. – studio
- Castle Communications Plc. – label
