= The Candidate (album) =

Studio album by Steve Harley
- Released: 5 October 1979
- Recorded: February 1979
- Genre: Pop rock
- Length: 40:19
- Label: EMI
- Producer: Steve Harley; Jimmy Horowitz

Steve Harley chronology
Hobo with a Grin (1978)	The Candidate (1979)	The Best of Steve Harley and Cockney Rebel (1980)

Singles from The Candidate
- 1. "Freedom's Prisoner" Released: 12 October 1979

The Candidate is the second solo studio album by English singer-songwriter Steve Harley, released by EMI on 5 October 1979. It was produced by Harley and Jimmy Horowitz.

== Background ==
The Candidate was written and recorded after Harley returned to live in London at the end of the 1978, after spending almost a year living in Los Angeles. During November 1978, the UK music press reported that after returning to England at Christmas, Harley would form a new band, record a new album in February and begin touring again later in the year. Speaking to the Daily Star in December 1978, Harley described the recording of his debut solo album Hobo with a Grin (1978) as "an experience", but added, "This time I'll do things very differently. I'll get the band together, then record the album in a fortnight – the way I always used to." Harley spent three weeks writing the songs for The Candidate and then recorded the album in February 1979 at Abbey Road Studios. The album's recording sessions were due to commence in late January 1979, but were delayed after Harley's tapes, containing his song ideas, were stuck in transit at Tilbury Docks due to the lorry drivers' strike of the time.

Speaking to Maggi Russell in early 1979, Harley revealed of the new album,

"I needed the energy that London has. West Coast musicians have done it all before, and they're very blase. Here people put their heart and soul into their music. Stuart Elliott and Jo Partridge from Cockney Rebel worked on the album with me. It's very important when you're spending 12 hours a day in the studio with a bunch of people that you get on well, that you share a sense of humour. Otherwise you all end up having a bad time. Hobo with a Grin was a difficult album, and hard to market. My new album leans back more to the early Cockney Rebel sound, a similar tempo, more commercial perhaps. I have made a record that I believe in. If the music press review it maturely I'll be glad, but that is doubtful. I'm really hoping for a good 1979, and I'm putting everything I've got into it. I'm back, and they are all going to know I am. You could spend a lot of time in this business getting affluent with success, but I'm more interested in my own sense of achievement. I hope my fans like it too."

In an interview with The Evening News in October 1979, Harley spoke of his return from America and the album's creation,

"I spent almost a full year out there and did nothing except swim and sunbathe and head for some party or other at night. I had a rented house in Beverley Hills – it was costing me about £300 a week and all I did was lie by the pool and have friends to stay at the guest house. I then realised that I was getting nowhere fast and booked London's Abbey Road studios for two months. I called my old Cockney Rebel drummer Stuart Elliott and asked him to put me a band together. I came back to London, and within about three weeks I had more than enough songs for an LP. I'm pleased with The Candidate – it's the best album I've done in ages."

Comparing The Candidate with Hobo with a Grin, Harley commented in his interview with The Evening News, "I looked at that LP the other day – looking is enough. I can't bear to listen to it. It's the worst thing I've ever done. I'm getting the old Cockney Rebel band together for a concert in London at the end of this month. And there won't be one song from the Hobo with a Grin LP in the set. But The Candidate is a different story altogether. After hours of deliberation, I've left out two songs from it and I hated doing that. There isn't a bad song on it."

== Song information ==
In a 2004 interview with The Baptist Times, Harley described "Audience with the Man" as being "very much about Jesus, or a Christian leader". He continued, "You know, it's humbling to admit we all get misguided at some time and that we need someone." "How Good It Feels" was inspired by Yvonne Keeley, with whom Harley was in a relationship with during the 1970s. "Young Hearts (The Candidate)" was originally recorded as "Too Young, Young Hearts" for Harley's previous album, Hobo with a Grin, but it was dropped from the final track listing and was then re-recorded for The Candidate.

== Release ==
Both The Candidate and its single, "Freedom's Prisoner", were released by EMI in October 1979. Despite predictions, The Candidate was a commercial failure, but "Freedom's Prisoner" did generate some chart action, peaking at number 58 in the UK singles chart. After the disappointing sales of The Candidate, EMI dropped Harley from their roster. The album would be Harley's last studio album until 1992's Yes You Can.

In 2000, The Candidate received its first CD release through Harley's own label, Comeuppance Discs. It contained two bonus tracks, the 1982 non-album single "I Can't Even Touch You", and a live version of the 1974 Cockney Rebel song "Psychomodo". On 6 October 2003, Voiceprint Records released the album on CD together with Harley's album Yes You Can as part of the label's "2 for One Series". On 31 October 2011, The Candidate was digitally remastered and released on CD by BGO Records as a double album set with Hobo with a Grin.

== Artwork ==
The photograph on the front sleeve of The Candidate was taken by Mick Rock alongside the River Thames in London area.

== Tour ==
Once The Candidate was recorded, Harley began planning a British and European tour for later in the year. When talking about his plans to form a new Cockney Rebel line-up, Harley told the Daily Mirror, "There will undoubtedly be some of the old group members in the line-up. Maybe Jim Cregan could join if he's not busy recording with Rod Stewart." In May 1979, Harley appeared with Peter Gabriel at one of Kate Bush's Hammersmith Odeon concerts in May 1979. It was Harley's first performance on stage in two years. Later in August, New Musical Express announced that Harley was currently bringing a touring band together and was in the middle of planning a British tour to follow the release of his new album. However, the plans for a British tour were ultimately scrapped and instead Harley performed a one-off sold-out show at the Hammersmith Odeon in London in October, with a new line-up of Cockney Rebel as his backing band.

== Critical reception ==
Professional ratings
Review scores
Source	Rating
Smash Hits	5/10
Record Mirror	4/5 stars

Upon its release, Mike Nicholls of Record Mirror praised the album in comparison to the "poor" Hobo with a Grin. He commented, "The Candidate shows Harley once again writing interesting and intelligent songs in a musical setting both contemporary and proficient. The honesty and unpretentious ingenuity of The Candidate should re-establish [him] as an artist working independently of current trends with a style and craftsmanship that easily transcends this or any other year's models." Aberdeen Press and Journal stated, "The Candidate finds Harley in fine form, vitriolic as ever." Aberdeen Evening Express noted, "Steve's back with an album which puts him more in a conformist category rather than a (Cockney) rebel. But it's great all the same. Funny how he always manages to come up with at least three brilliant tracks on each album. This time it's 'Audience with the Man', 'Freedom's Prisoner' and 'How Good It Feels'. His lyrics and eloquent singing are still very much the Harley of old." Mike Pryce of the Worcester Evening News felt that the album did not "reach the heights" of the "excellent" "Freedom's Prisoner", but still considered it a "very useful set from someone who has been off the scene as long as Steve". He noted that "some of the songs are wonderfully strong in their lyrics" and picked "One More Time" and "How Good It Feels" as two "super examples". He concluded, "I fear that in his absence Steve's scene may have deserted him, but if he keeps up the quality like this then he'll come again, no sweat."

Red Starr of Smash Hits commented, "Harley's never fully developed talents have scraped rock bottom in recent years. Side one here is back to his stylish, tuneful, Cockney Rebel best, but side two is simply pedestrian Americanised blandness that provokes only weariness. A mixed up album from a mixed up man but all credit for returning to the fray." He considered "Audience with the Man" and "Freedom's Prisoner" to be the album's best tracks. A reviewer for the Shropshire Star stated that Harley had "produced a good side one", but felt side two was "tediously repetitive". He picked "Freedom's Prisoner" as the "best track", but added that "Audience with the Man" is "pretty good" and "Woodchopper" has "some clever lyrics". Gary Paul of Bedfordshire on Sunday wrote, "Steve attacks the lyrics but generally leaves the impression that he would be better suited to songs which are more MOR as the backing often swamps his words." Nick Kehoe of the Telegraph & Argus believed it to be a "good album with a lively range of music from rock to ballads", but he also felt that it "doesn't have the special quality Harley is capable of producing".

Jon Hibbs of the Cambridge Evening News believed Harley displayed a "wet and placcid performance" on the album and felt he was "suffering from a bad case of lost identity". He praised "Freedom's Prisoner" for "effectively recreat[ing] the off-beat and plodding bass" of "Mr. Soft", but was less enthusiastic about the remaining material, stating, "The cockney rebel's ire is dissipated into trite hymns to 'young hearts' and 'love on the rocks' together with pedestrian reworkings of other people's ideas." Peter Steward of the Eastern Evening News felt Harley was "still desperately searching for an identity outside Cockney Rebel". He noted a "few good moments both musically and lyrically", but added there is "little magic about his album, as Harley becomes lost with a disc that will keep him in the pop wilderness". Graham Lock of NME was negative in his review, accusing The Candidate as "sound[ing] like a very poor, watered-down version" of Bob Dylan's Blonde on Blonde. He felt that the material had "no good tunes, no catchy hooks, nothing interesting at all – just dreary meanderings, a cocktail-lounge version of mid-'60s rock". He concluded, "When he makes an album as weak, stale and utterly pointless as this one, then the only thing Harley's a candidate for is the dole queue."

=== Retrospective reviews ===
Professional ratings
Review scores
Source	Rating
AllMusic	4/5 stars
Q	4/5 stars
Record Collector	2/5 stars

Dave Thompson of AllMusic retrospectively wrote, "When 'Freedom's Prisoner' hit the airwaves in fall 1979, it would have taken a lot to convince the longtime fan that the man hadn't resparked all his old glories again. It was Harley's finest 45 in half a decade. It was also a total fluke, as the accompanying album flopped onto the streets and proved itself to be little more than a clutch of substandard songs, glued together by alluring production alone. 'Audience with the Man' and 'From Here to Eternity' do bear repeated listens, but too much of The Candidate clung so lifelessly to the stylus that it was hard to believe our hopes had ever soared so high."

Of the 2000 re-issue of the album, Q commented, "Despite Harley returning to Blighty, the splendid The Candidate sold so poorly that EMI dumped what four years previously had been their major act. 'Freedom's Prisoner' deserved to be an enormous hit, 'Woodchopper' rhymes 'editorial' with 'accusatorial', and the soul-baring 'One More Time' ruminates lasciviously on being taken from behind the leopardesses. Time surely for a little readjustment of history." Of the 2011 BGO double CD release of the album with Hobo with a Grin, Terry Staunton of Record Collector stated, "Harley's opening brace of releases not to feature the Cockney Rebel name took him ever further away from the glam/art rock of his chart past. Hobo with a Grin takes stabs at anything and everything. The following year's offering draws from just as big a notice board, but the musical thumbtacks are rarely strong enough to hold the ideas in place. 'Audience with the Man' and 'From Here to Eternity' suggest a love for early Springsteen, but with little of Bruce's energy or articulacy, 'How Good It Feels' is passable Brit country, while 'Freedom's Prisoners' sounds like synth-rock played by jet-lagged Cossacks."

== Track listing ==
No.	Title	Writer(s)	Length
1.	"Audience With the Man"	Steve Harley	5:38
2.	"Woodchopper"	Harley	3:44
3.	"Freedom's Prisoner"	Harley, Jimmy Horowitz	3:47
4.	"Love on the Rocks"	Harley	3:32
5.	"Who's Afraid?"	Harley	4:13
6.	"One More Time"	Harley	4:25
7.	"How Good It Feels"	Harley	4:07
8.	"From Here to Eternity"	Harley	5:08
9.	"Young Hearts (The Candidate)"	Harley	5:25

2000 Comeuppance Discs CD bonus tracks
No.	Title	Writer(s)	Length
10.	"I Can't Even Touch You"	Harley	4:00
11.	"Psychomodo (Live)"	Harley	3:37

== Personnel ==
- Steve Harley – vocals
- Jo Partridge – guitar
- Nico Ramsden – guitar, backing vocals
- Phil Palmer – guitar
- Joey Carbone – keyboards, backing vocals
- Steve Gregory – saxophone, saxophone arrangement
- John Giblin – bass
- Stuart Elliott – drums
- Bryn Haworth – mandolin (track 1)
- Jimmy Horowitz – celesta (track 2)
- The English Chorale – choir (track 3)
- Robert Howes – choir director (track 3)
- Yvonne Keeley – backing vocals

Production

- Steve Harley, Jimmy Horowitz – producers
- Mike Hedges – mixing (track 3)
- Tony Clark – engineer (all tracks)
- Haydn Bendall – assistant engineer (all tracks)
- Chris Blair – mastering

Sleeve

- Graham Marks – design (front cover lettering)
- Mick Rock – front/back cover photography, design for TRA Studios Inc., art direction for TRA Studios Inc.
- Ernie Thormahlen – design for TRA Studios Inc., art direction for TRA Studios Inc.
- Richard Young – inner sleeve photography
- Billyee – design (inner sleeve and album back jacket graphic and design) for Bine Graphic Designs Inc.
- Neal Kandel – design (inner sleeve and album back jacket graphic and design) for Bine Graphic Designs Inc.
