= I Can't Even Touch You =

1982 song by Steve Harley & Cockney Rebel

Single by Steve Harley & Cockney Rebel
- B-side: "I Can Be Anyone"
- Released: 12 March 1982
- Genre: Rock
- Length: 4:04
- Label: Chrysalis
- Songwriter: Steve Harley
- Producer: Midge Ure

Steve Harley & Cockney Rebel singles chronology
"Make Me Smile (Come Up and See Me) (re-issue)" (1981)	"I Can't Even Touch You" (1982)	"Ballerina (Prima Donna)" (1983)

"I Can't Even Touch You" is a song by the English singer-songwriter Steve Harley, released under his band's name Steve Harley & Cockney Rebel by Chrysalis as a non-album single on 12 March 1982. The song was written by Harley and produced by Midge Ure.

== Background ==
After the poor commercial performance of his 1979 album The Candidate, Harley was dropped by EMI Records, leaving him without a record deal. By late 1980, he had started writing new material again and was hoping to sign a new record contract and record a new album. He told the Shropshire Star in August 1981, "I've written some strong new songs. I just felt I didn't have anything I wanted to say for myself, [but] now I'm really keen to sign a new record deal." The recording and release of "I Can't Even Touch You" came to fruition after Harley met Chris Wright, the founder and chairman of Chrysalis Records, during a visit to the Sandown Park Racecourse in 1981. As a result of their conversation there, Harley sent Wright the song's demo recording and, showing interest in the song, Wright subsequently signed Harley under a one-year contract, with options, to Chrysalis.

Prior to the recording sessions for "I Can't Even Touch You", Steve Harley and Cockney Rebel embarked on a ten date UK tour in December 1981, where the song was first introduced to an audience, alongside two other new tracks: "Don't Shoot, Till You See The Whites Of Their Eyes" (a.k.a. "The Race Game") and "Not From Her World" (a cover of a 4 Out of 5 Doctors song). The NME announced in November 1981 that Harley and his band would be "record[ing] the new single right after these dates with Midge Ure producing, for release in the New Year".

Wright suggested that Ure should produce the track. Ure told the Evening Standard in 1982, "I've always been a fan of Steve's so I was really glad when he asked me to work with him. I think it was quite difficult for him because he's quite a man for speaking his mind. But he was very good at holding back at making too many suggestions in the studio." Alan Darby, Cockney Rebel's guitarist of the time, played the lead guitar parts on the track. He also laid down the original eight-to-the-bar chugging rhythm part, but Ure thought his contribution was slightly off-beat at times and therefore re-did the part himself. Some of the keyboards on the song were performed by Andy Qunta, later of Icehouse fame, who joined Steve Harley and Cockney Rebel in late 1981.

Speaking to the Evening Express in March 1982, Harley said, "The only reason I haven't made records since The Candidate is that I have had nothing of merit to say. Who does, come to that, in rock 'n' roll? I thought I'd wait until I met the right people to manage me, the right record company to record me and the right frame of mind to carry me through." In a 1982 interview with Larry Jaffee, Harley said of the single in context of his songwriting, "It was a record I was proud of, because I was ready to write. I couldn't write for two years, I didn't want to."

"I Can't Even Touch You" was released in March 1982, but failed to make an appearance in the UK Singles Chart. It did, however, reach number 132 on the Record Business Bubbling Under Singles chart on 5 April. It dropped to number 137 the following week and number 144 the week after that. Both Chrysalis and fans of Steve Harley & Cockney Rebel had believed at the time that the song would become a hit. It was Harley's only release that year and his only through Chrysalis. Although not released in North America, the song gained some airplay on the Toronto rock radio station CFNY-FM in April–May 1982.

In 1985, Harley recalled of the song's lack of commercial success, "Midge and I always talk about that [song]. We were both very disappointed [that it wasn't a hit]." Harley and Ure worked together again in circa 1984 on another Harley solo track, but the song has never been released. Harley also gave Ure some lyrics for potential use on his first solo album, but they were not used.

== Release ==
"I Can't Even Touch You" was released by Chrysalis Records on 7-inch vinyl in the UK, Germany, the Netherlands, Spain and Portugal. The B-side, "I Can Be Anyone", was also written by Harley and produced by Ure. The track has remained exclusive to the single and has not appeared on any other release. "I Can Be Anyone" was first introduced live during Cockney Rebel's 1980 Christmas tour, along with two other new songs, "Warm My Cold Heart" and "Such is Life". The single was released with a full colour picture sleeve, featuring a photograph of Harley.

Shortly after its release, "I Can't Even Touch You" and its B-side were the first tracks to be acquired by music publishers Star Street Music Ltd, which was established in 1982 by Eric Hall as a joint venture company with EMI Music Publishing.

Following its release as a single, the song would later appear on three Steve Harley & Cockney Rebel compilations: 1999's The Cream of Steve Harley & Cockney Rebel, 2006's The Cockney Rebel – A Steve Harley Anthology and 2008's The Best of Steve Harley and Cockney Rebel. It also appeared as a bonus track on the 2000 CD release of Harley's 1979 album The Candidate.

== Promotion ==
A full-page black-and-white advert was included in the 27 March 1982 issue of Melody Maker and a smaller advert included in the 1 April 1982 issue of Smash Hits to promote the release of the new single.

The song has been performed live on a number of occasions. It was performed at Steve Harley & Cockney Rebel's 1984 concert at the Camden Palace, London, which was filmed for TV and released on the VHS Live from London in 1985. When the band returned to touring in 1989, the song was occasionally included in the set-list. Around 2004, the song was again reintroduced for a brief time, and was performed live at Glastonbury Festival in 2005.

== Critical reception ==
Upon its release, Keith Franzke of Burnley's Evening Star noted that Harley's "panache for crisp, melody-splashed pop tunes is resurrected on this appealing mid-pace ditty where he still plays vocal games, wraps up his story in a hypnotic arrangement, and sounds stronger than ever." He added that Ure "produces with tender care". John Gibson of the Edinburgh Evening News noted, "This could pass for something out of the Chas & Dave songbook." Simon Mares of the Reading Evening Post commented, "After years in the wilderness, Steve Harley and Cockney Rebel return with a Midge Ure-produced song which has Steve sounding very like Bowie. Kevin Bryan of the Whitehaven News said that Harley had "return[ed] to the fray with a distinctive little ditty which bears the unmistakable production stamp of Midge Ure". He called it a "worthwhile release but one that's unlikely to sell in huge quantities". Brian Aitken of the Evening Express wrote, "'I Can't Even Touch You' may not be top ten material but it contains enough evidence to suggest that a fresh Steve Harley is ready for stardom again."

Sunie Fletcher of Record Mirror wrote, "Laidback rock music for (ahem) mature tastes, I suppose. Not mine, certainly, but the tune is very pretty and it's all very tasteful and that." Tim de Lisle of Smash Hits commented, "Produced, like Visage, by the tireless Midge Ure but beyond that there's not much else to be said for it. Pleasant, colourless and a far cry from his hits of the 70s." Julie Burchill of the NME stated, "An insipid Cockney encore for those wonderful swollen vowels you'll remember forever and all-round tortured mediocrity. Music not to give up your day-job to. Mr Harley was led back from the wilderness by M. Ure of Samaritans Inc." Another NME review, written by Richard Cook, was also negative, remarking, "An agonised confession involving age, a misspent success and a loser's sense of humour (i.e. none at all). Both supplied by Midge Ure, whose swollen visions of Europa are becoming thunderously uninteresting. Made for each other."

== Track listing ==
7-inch single

1. "I Can't Even Touch You" – 4:04
2. "I Can Be Anyone" – 3:20

== Personnel ==
- Steve Harley – vocals
- Midge Ure – producer, rhythm guitar
- Alan Darby – lead guitar
- Ian Nice – keyboards
- Andy Qunta – keyboards

== Charts ==
Chart (1982)	Peak position
UK Bubbling Under Singles 101–150 (Record Business)	132
