= Foundation KiKa =

Dutch cancer charity foundation

The Foundation Kika (Dutch: Stichting Kinderen Kankervrij; English: Children Cancer-free Foundation) is a Dutch charity foundation that brings in fundings solely for research to childhood cancers. Renewing research to this form of cancer requires a treatment that specifically aims to the genomic properties.

KiKa is the only charity in the Netherlands that funds research on all forms of childhood cancer. KiKa raises funds for innovative research and other activities in the field of childhood cancer, aimed at less pain, more cure and a better quality of life. Furthermore, KiKa focuses on education on childhood cancer. Kika is the main financial supporter of the Princess Máxima Center.
