= Poetic Justice (Steve Harley album) =

Studio album by Steve Harley
- Released: 26 August 1996
- Genre: Rock
- Length: 51:43
- Label: Transatlantic
- Producer: Steve Harley

Steve Harley chronology
Yes You Can (1992)	Poetic Justice (1996)	More Than Somewhat – The Very Best of Steve Harley (1998)

Poetic Justice is the fourth solo studio album by English singer-songwriter Steve Harley, released by Transatlantic on 26 August 1996.

== Background ==
Poetic Justice was Harley's first album since 1992's Yes You Can, but marked the first time he had been writing "prolifically in 20 years". He aimed to create a "sincere album" with songs that he could deliver "with passion" and "fit in with the real Steve Harley". Harley recorded Poetic Justice at Berry House Studios in Ardingly, Sussex, between 1995 and 1996, with a number of musicians, including Nick Pynn, Phil Beer, Thomas Arnold, (his brother) Ian Nice, Andrew Brown and Paul Francis. He told the Stockport Times in 1996, "It's my first album for four years so it's like a new beginning. It has blue and dark moments but then so has my life. Some of the songs may appear quite gloomy but I find it optimistic. It's my most confident set of lyrics ever. I've never made a record like this, where I can come away and I genuinely want to sing and play it live." He added to The Westmorland Gazette in 1996, "There is nothing phony about it. It has a continuity and a sense of self respect about it."

Speaking of his songwriting during this period of his career, Harley told The Birmingham Post in 1998, "In the Cockney Rebel days I was perhaps more detached as a songwriter than I am now. When you've had kids you change, but I'm still a terribly romantic animal. What I'm finding as I get older is that the songs allow me to express my sense of romance. Those who come to the concerts don't seem to mind, in fact many of them say Poetic Justice is their favourite album."

In 2002, Harley spoke of songwriting and Poetic Justice in an interview with Perfect Sound Forever. He said,

"Songwriting is one of the few jobs even in the world of creative art that we do where you don't get better with age. It's also true perhaps with novelists: that their best work is often left behind in their twenties and up to their mid thirties, when you're truly inspired and think you can rule the world. In '96, I released Poetic Justice and I do five or six songs from that most nights on tour and I would say they might just be the best songs I've ever written and they touch people as though they're the best songs I've ever written and they go down as though they were big hits."

In 2003, Harley picked Poetic Justice as the "favourite album of my entire career" and one which "reflect[s] my age and my experience and all that stuff".

== Song information ==
Poetic Justice features seven new songs, three covers, and a 'live in the studio' re-recording of "Riding the Waves (For Virginia Woolf)", a song which originally appeared on Harley's 1978 debut solo album Hobo with a Grin. In constrast to a lot of his earlier work, Harley wrote a lot of the material for Poetic Justice on piano rather than guitar.

"That's My Life in Your Hands" was written by Harley and Hugh Nicholson. The song originated as "Starlight Jingles", which was first recorded by Nicholson's band Blue during their sessions at Los Angeles between 1979 and 1982, and later by Radio Heart for their self-titled 1987 album. Harley approached Nicholson to rewrite the lyrics and record his own version of the song. Harley has described "Two Damn'd Lies" as "reflecting on the human hipocracy" and "how we can't help ourselves" in being "contrary, hypocritical and selfish", while calling "Loveless" "like a surreal romp through life", where the character is "reflecting over his life, thinking he's loveless, but in fact he's not alone".

"The Last Time I Saw You" received its debut live performance on 27 January 1994 at the Jabez Clegg in Manchester. Its second live performance, alongside "Make Me Smile (Come Up and See Me)", was at the Mick Ronson Memorial Concert at the Hammersmith Odeon in London on 29 April 1994. The performance was released on the compilation album The Mick Ronson Memorial Concert in 2001. In 2024, Nick Pynn, who played guitar on the track, picked it as his favourite out of all the songs he recorded with Harley. The guitar solo used parts recorded from two separate takes.

The album's three covers were songs Harley "totally adore[d]" and had wished he had written himself: Jimmy Ruffin's "What Becomes of the Broken-Hearted?", Bob Dylan's "Love Minus Zero-No Limit" and Van Morrison's "Crazy Love". In a 1996 interview with Birmingham Evening Mail, Harley said, "I didn't need the help of other songwriters. The reason there are cover versions is because I've reached the stage where I'm genuinely at ease with myself, whatever talent I've got. I've done some covers on stage but I only ever pick ones I wish I'd written myself. 'What Becomes of the Broken Hearted', for example, is a classic piece of writing." Speaking of "What Becomes of the Broken Hearted", Harley told the Peterborough Evening Telegraph, "I first fell in love to that song. It's a great, great song." He also revealed to BBC Radio 2 in 1998, "I love the way we did this [track]. I produced it myself, but a lot of the ideas were down to the guys that were working with me. They were really involved in the production. [It was] kind of transformed [compared] to the Jimmy Ruffin original." Speaking of "Love Minus Zero-No Limit", Harley told The Westmorland Gazette, "I think [Dylan] wrote it as a paean and this is my paean, my prayer with a small 'p' as it were, to him – a sort of nod. Without him, I would never have picked up a guitar." In a 1997 interview with Smiler, Harley admitted, "There's a lot of people who are quite unhappy with the covers that I've done on my new album, so I'm thinking I won't bother doing any again. My audience think I've run out of ideas if I only write eight [songs] out of eleven."

== Release ==
Poetic Justice was released on CD by Transatlantic Records, a division of Castle Communications, on 26 August 1996.

No singles were released from the album, despite Harley's interest in releasing "That's My Life in Your Hands", "What Becomes of the Broken-Hearted?" and "The Last Time I Saw You". In his interview with Smiler, Harley commented, "They should have released 'The Last Time I Saw You' or 'That's My Life in Your Hands' – they would have got a lot of airplay – not Radio One – but a good plugger these days gets people like me on all those "gold" stations or Virgin – they'll all play it, and even if it was only a turntable hit, I'd have liked that, but record companies now are run by accountants. It's hard to get anyone to talk sense." In response to Robson & Jerome reaching the UK number one spot in 1996 with their own version of "What Becomes of the Broken-Hearted?", Harley added, "I'd recorded it long before they turned up. We were saying to the record company, I'd done this as a single, and they hadn't got a bloody clue. Three months later it was being played by them."

A re-issue of the album was released by Castle Music Ltd on 7 October 2002. Another re-issue, as a digi-pack CD, followed on 20 September 2010 by Repertoire Records, under license from Comeuppance Ltd. In 2010–11, Sanctuary Fontana made the album available as a digital download on sites such as iTunes.

== Promotion ==
In September and October 1996, Steve Harley & Cockney Rebel embarked on the UK 19-date Poetic Justice Tour, and this was followed by a series of European dates. For the tour, Harley was joined by Cockney Rebel members Nick Pynn on guitar, fiddle and mandocello, and Billy Dyer on bass, along with three new members: Tom Arnold on keyboards, Susan Harvey on keyboards and vocals, and Adam Houghton on drums. Band rehearsals commenced on 15 September 1996. Approximately 30 songs were rehearsed in total and around 25 were performed each night of the tour.

The album was advertised in various music magazines, including Mojo and Q. Harley was disappointed in Transatlantic's lack of promotion for Poetic Justice and the album's failure to reach a wide audience. He told The Birmingham Post in 1998, "You can only do your best. When you are someone like me who spends two years writing the songs and they come from the heart and then you find there's no serious marketing campaign for the product it's pretty depressing. My manager is in the process of discussing buying it back so we can re-release it."

== Critical reception ==
Professional ratings
Review scores
Source	Rating
AllMusic	3.5/5 stars
The Virgin Encyclopedia of 70s Music	2/4 stars

On its release, High Fidelity News and Record Review wrote, "Something about Harley has him classified, historically, with rock's assholes, but this latest solo almost redeems him. His first in five years contains a cluster of originals and three seemingly out-of-place covers which actually work in the context of his own songs." Simon Evans of The Birmingham Post noted Harley's voice was "less mannered" and the arrangements "less grandiose" than in his Cockney Rebel days, but felt there are "flashes of the old Harley" in the "aching, regretful" "Two Damn'd Lies" and "All in a Life's Work". He believed Cockney Rebel's "faded bohemianism" was "best captured" on the "sumptuous" version of "Love Minus Zero/No Limit" and described the "lovely" "The Last Time I Saw You" as a song which "ranks alongside Harley's very best". Evans also noted the influence of Bob Dylan across the album, writing, "Dylan's presence hangs heavy, not just in Harley's poetic conceits but also on the Blonde on Blonde sound of a song like 'Loveless'. Harley however is too much of an original to get trapped in mere imitation."

Thom Jurek of AllMusic described Poetic Justice as "a very solid and subdued set for Harley" and "fine work top to bottom" which "should be owned by any fan, or investigated by the curious". Jurek wrote, "He's in fine voice here, and his own songs are pretty much top of the heap for having been some '20 years past his prime' as some jive Brit journo called him. It's nonsense, of course, since Harley may not have had the hits in the '90s, but certainly had the requisite taste, musicianship and elegance to put a collection of songs together like this one."

== Track listing ==
All tracks are written by Steve Harley except where noted.

No.	Title	Writer(s)	Length
1.	"That's My Life in Your Hands"	Harley, Hugh Nicholson	3:50
2.	"What Becomes of the Broken-Hearted?"	James Dean, Paul Riser, William Weatherspoon	4:13
3.	"Two Damn'd Lies"		5:07
4.	"Loveless"		4:47
5.	"Strange Communications"		4:06
6.	"All in a Life's Work"		4:57
7.	"Love Minus Zero-No Limit"	Bob Dylan	6:08
8.	"Safe"		3:43
9.	"The Last Time I Saw You"		5:12
10.	"Crazy Love"	Van Morrison	3:24
11.	"Riding the Waves (For Virginia Woolf)"		6:08

== Personnel ==
Credits are adapted from the Poetic Justice CD album booklet.

- Steve Harley – vocals
- Nick Pynn – acoustic guitar, 12-string guitar, dulcimer, mando-cello
- Phil Beer – electric guitar, acoustic guitar, bottle-neck guitar, violin, vocals
- Richard Durrant – classical guitar (track 10)
- Thomas Arnold – Hammond organ, piano, honky-tonk, percussion
- Ian Nice – piano, keyboards
- Andrew Brown – bass guitar, double-bass
- Herbie Flowers – double-bass (track 5)
- Paul Francis – drums
- Mark Price – drums (tracks 5, 9)
- Susan Harvey – vocals

Production

- Steve Harley – producer
- Curtis Schwartz – engineer

Other

- Phil Nicholls – sleeve photography
- Chris Insoll – photo tinting
- Hugh Gilmour at Castle – design
- Steve Blackwell – representation
- James Wyllie – representation
- Paul Charles at Asgard – agency
