= Patricia Paay =

Dutch singer

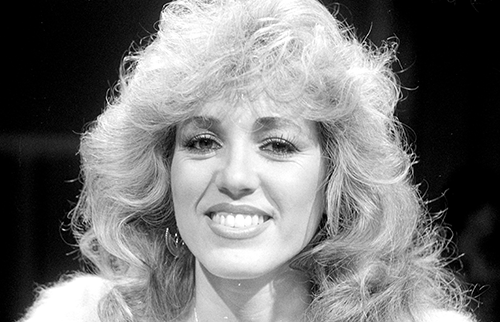
- Paay, 1982

Background information
- Born: Patricia Anglaia Margareth Paaij; 7 April 1949 (age 77); Rotterdam, Netherlands
- Genres: Jazz; disco; folk; pop
- Occupations: Singer; media personality
- Instrument: Vocals
- Years active: 1965–present

Patricia Anglaia Margareth Paaij (born 7 April 1949), best known as Patricia Paay, is a Dutch singer, radio host, glamour model and television personality. In the Netherlands, she is well known for her musical career, which spans over four decades. She is also regularly featured on Dutch television and in Dutch tabloid media. Singer Yvonne Keeley is her sister.

In 1984, Paay was the first glamour model in the Dutch edition of Playboy. In 2009, Paay posed for the December issue of the Dutch version of the magazine at age 60, making it the third time she had posed for Playboy.

== Family ==
She was married to Adam Curry between 1989 and 2009 and they have one daughter, Christina Curry.

== Discography ==
=== Albums ===
- Portret van Patricia (1969)
- Beam of Light (1975)
- The Lady Is a Champ (1977)
- Malibu Touch (1978)
- Playmate (1981)
- Dreamworld (1983)
- Time of My Life (1995)

=== Singles ===
- 1966 - No one can love you like I do (as Patricia)
- 1967 - You called me baby (as Patricia)
- 1967 - Je bent niet hip (as Patricia; #12 in Dutch top 40)
- 1967 - Wat moet ik doen (as Patricia; #36 in Dutch top 40)
- 1968 - Corriamo (as Patricia; #33 in Dutch top 40)
- 1968 - Hey girls (as Honey Bee)
- 1968 - Hey taxi (as Patty Paay; German single)
- 1968 - Dat is de liefde (as Patricia)
- 1968 - Tambourine girl (as Patricia)
- 1969 - Kleine tovenaar (as Patricia)
- 1969 - Sim sala bim (as Patricia)
- 1969 - Fisherman king (as Patricia, with Brainbox)
- 1969 - Sing me a lovesong/All or nothing (as Honey Bee & the Harbourlights)
- 1970 - Were you there (Paay, The Buffoons, Left Side, and Unit Gloria)
- 1970 - Tell me you're never gonna leave me (as Patricia, accompanied by Golden Earring)
- 1971 - Put your hand in the hand (as member of Himalaya)
- 1972 - I believe in love (as Honey Pie; with her sister, Yvonne)
- 1973 - Easy Boy (as background singer at Greenfield & Cook; #8 in Dutch top 40)
- 1973 - Music lovin' girl (as member of Sealegs)
- 1975 - Can you please crawl out your window
- 1976 - Children come home
- 1976 - Someday my prince will come (#22 in Dutch top 40)
- 1976 - Now is the moment (#20 in Dutch top 40)
- 1977 - Who's that lady with my man (#2 in Dutch top 40)
- 1977 - Livin' without you (#5 in Dutch top 40)
- 1978 - Everlasting love
- 1978 - Malibu (#14 in Dutch top 40)
- 1979 - The best friend I know (duet with sister Yvonne) (#26 in Dutch top 40)
- 1979 - You colour my life (promo single for Mary Quant)
- 1979 - You Make it Alright (duet with Jacques Kloes; #25 in Dutch top 40)
- 1980 - Give it to me
- 1980 - Maybe - To know him is to love him (#31 in Dutch top 40)
- 1980 - Sweets For My Sweet - Definitely Too Young
- 1981 - Who let the heartache in (#9 in Dutch top 40)
- 1981 - Saturday nights (#15 in the Dutch top 40)
- 1982 - A dime a dance
- 1982 - Queen for tonight
- 1982 - Tomorrow (#6 in Dutch top 40)
- 1983 - Solitaire (#16 in Dutch top 40)
- 1987 - Stop me
- 1992 - De wereld (duet with Rob de Nijs)
- 1995 - I've never been to me
- 1998 - I Love My Daughter Aimee (with Adam Curry, her former husband, and their daughter, Christina)
- 2000 - Daddy (as Patricia Paay & the John Paay Orchestra)
- 2009 - Who's that lady with my man '09 (John Marks, featuring Patricia Paay)
- 2009 - Verlief (duet with Diego)
