= Bedfordshire on Sunday =

Defunct newspaper published in Bedfordshire, England

- Type: Sunday newspaper
- Format: Tabloid
- Owner: Local World
- Editor: Sarah Cox
- Founded: 1977
- Ceased publication: 1 October 2017
- Political alignment: Independent, centrist
- Headquarters: Bedford, England
- Price: Free distribution
- Website: bedfordshire-news.co.uk

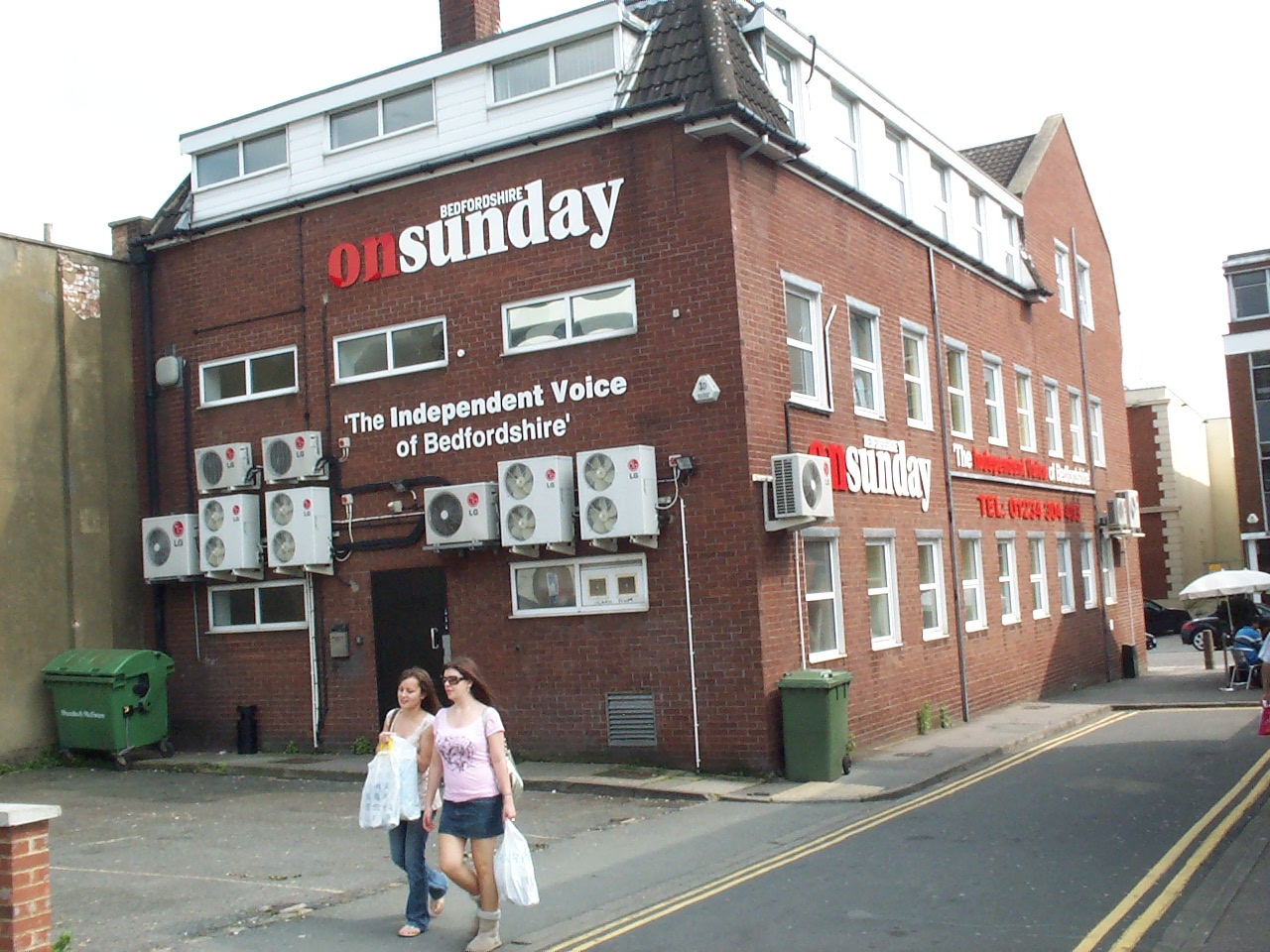
Former Bedfordshire on Sunday offices

Bedfordshire on Sunday (BoS) was a free local newspaper published in Bedfordshire, England. It was distributed as two editions, one covering the Borough of Bedford, the other edition serves Central Bedfordshire. The gross distribution was around 112,000.

== Distribution ==
The newspaper was distributed either by delivery through letterboxes on a Sunday morning, or more recently given out at local supermarkets, newsagents and other local points of interest.

The paper was published by LSN Media Ltd which was previously owned by Frank Branston. Branston, who founded the newspaper in 1977, went on to become the first directly elected mayor of the borough of Bedford in 2002. Branston sold his share of LSN to Iliffe News and Media in 2005.

In 2012, Local World acquired Iliffe News & Media from Yattendon Group, and in turn this was acquired by Trinity Mirror. The newspaper's last edition was on 1 October 2017, (one of 40 local newspapers to close that year) and was replaced by a midweek newspaper with less emphasis on news and more on leisure activities called Bedfordshire Midweek, however this was closed after eight months of publication.

== Style ==
The style of journalism was generally more sensationalist than a typical local paper. Its front page stories were often picked up by the national press over the years, including a story about dead bodies being stored in a chapel at Bedford Hospital rather than a morgue in 2001. A story about a teenager being banned for life from the United States after insulting Barack Obama received worldwide attention in 2010.

=== Online media ===
Bedfordshire on Sunday published most of its news online for free, but Trinity Mirror shut the sites down shortly after the closure of the print edition.
