= Duncan Mackay (musician) =

British musician and composer (born 1950)

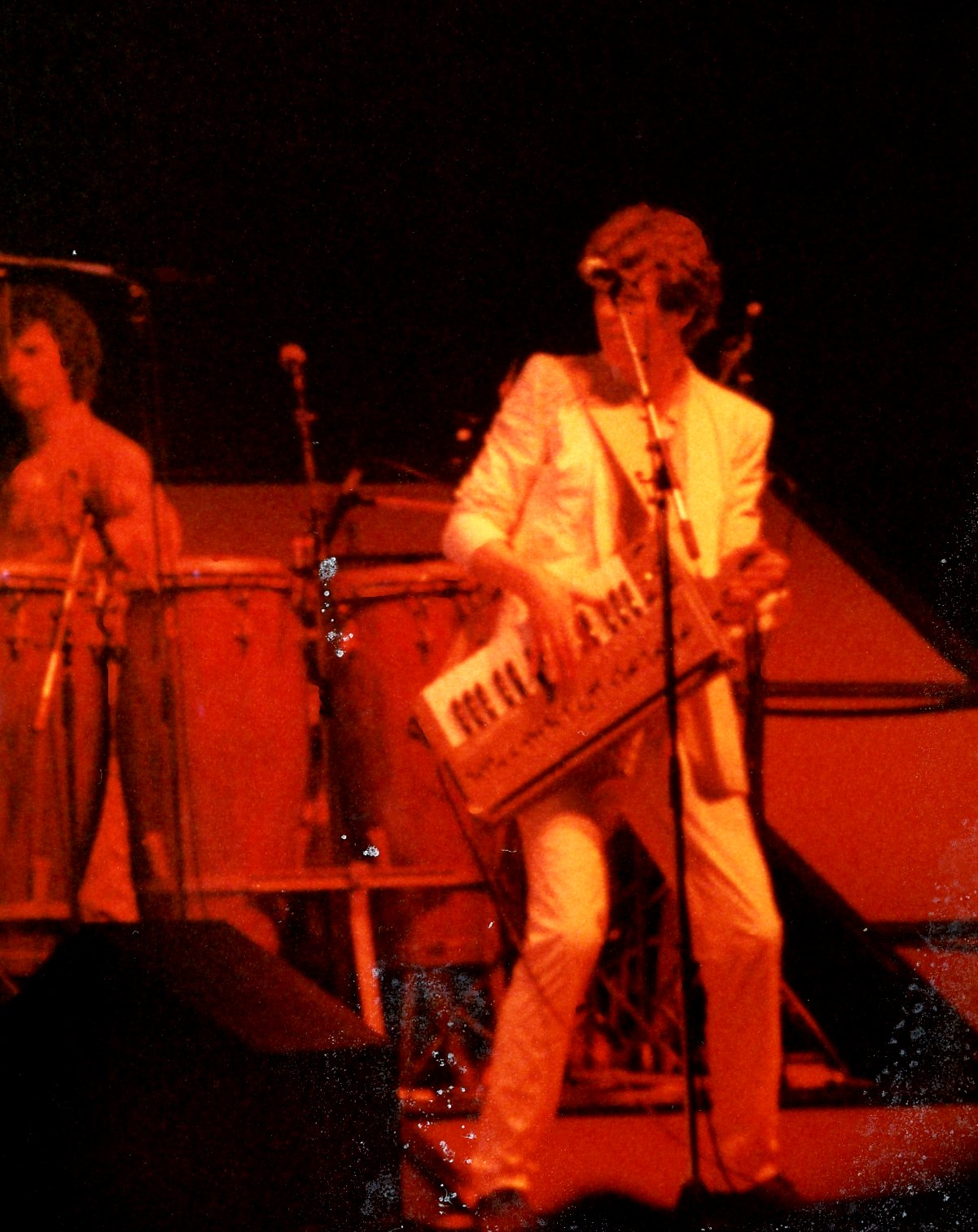
- MacKay performing with Elkie Brooks in 1983.

Background information
- Born: 26 July 1950 (age 75); Leeds, Yorkshire, England
- Occupations: Musician; composer
- Instruments: Vocals; keyboards
- Years active: 1960s–present
- Labels: Vertigo; EMI; Edge; Themes International; Virgin
- Website: duncanmackayrecording.com

Duncan Mackay (born 26 July 1950) is a British composer, singer, arranger, and keyboard player who has recorded eight solo albums as well as collaborations. He was born in Leeds, Yorkshire, England.

He played with Steve Harley & Cockney Rebel from 1974 to 1977 and 10cc from 1978 to 1981, and also played on Kate Bush's first three albums, The Kick Inside, Lionheart (both 1978) and Never for Ever (1980), as well as Camel's albums Nude (1981) and The Single Factor (1982), and Budgie's 1982 album Deliver Us from Evil. In the early 1980s, he was briefly considered for the keyboard player position in Yes.

In 2004, he completed an album with South African singer/composer Greg McEwan-Kocovaos, The First Time. This indie album received its first airplay on Radio Caroline by the veteran UK DJ Martin Turner and was reviewed by the official 10cc fan site.

Mackay's daughter Fawn James is the maternal granddaughter of Paul Raymond.

== Discography ==
Solo

- Chimera (1974)
- Score (1977)
- Visa (1980)
- The Heart of the Machine (1988)
- The New Explorers (1988)
- Forward Vision (1988) (EP)
- Data First (1988)
- Russell Grant's Zodiac (1990)
- A Picture of Sound (2017) (1993)
- Kintsugi (2019)

Steve Harley & Cockney Rebel

- The Best Years of Our Lives (1975)
- Timeless Flight (1976)
- Love's a Prima Donna (1976)

The Alan Parsons Project

- I Robot (1977)
- Pyramid (1978)
- Eve (1979)

10cc

- Bloody Tourists (1978)
- Look Hear? (1980)

Kate Bush

- The Kick Inside (1978)
- Lionheart (1978 )
- Never for Ever (1980)

Camel

- Nude (1981)
- The Single Factor (1982)

Budgie

- Deliver Us from Evil (1982)

with Greg McEwan Kocovaos

- The First Time (2004)

with Georg Voros

- For Johann (2015) (EP)
- The Bletchley Park Project (2017)

with Fluance

- Lunacy (2020)

Rebeka Rain, Mick Evans, Duncan MacKay

- Painted Secrets (2018)
- 7 Whispers (2018) (single)
- The Point (2019) (single)
- Not Meant for Me (2019) (single)
- Gone Insane (2019) (single)
- Your Life (2019) (single)
- Learn to Live (2020) (single)
- As the Sun Goes Down (2020) (single)
