= Yvonne Keeley =

Dutch singer

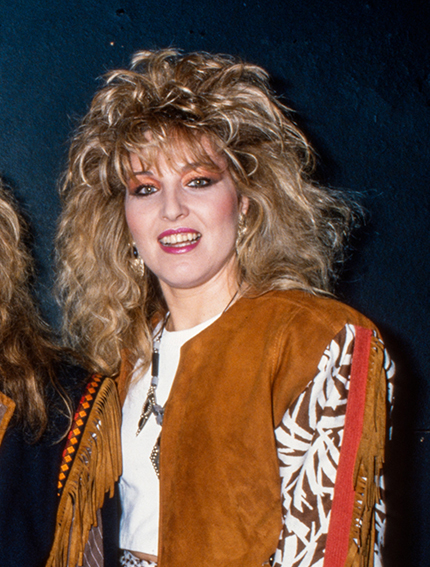
- Keeley in 1985

Background information
- Born: Yvonne Paaij; 6 September 1952 (age 73)
- Origin: Rotterdam, Netherlands
- Genres: Pop
- Occupations: Singer, presenter
- Instrument: Singing
- Years active: 1975–present

Yvonne Keeley (born Yvonne Paaij, 6 September 1952) is a Dutch pop music singer. She is the sister of Patricia Paay.

She began her career as a session singer in the music industry in London, working with Madeline Bell and Vicki Brown. She was the girlfriend of Steve Harley of Steve Harley & Cockney Rebel, and sang on the 1975 hit, "Make Me Smile (Come Up and See Me)". The couple lived together in London from 1973 to 1979.

Most notably she performed as a duet with Scott Fitzgerald on the song "If I Had Words", which reached number 3 in the UK Singles Chart and Australia in 1978. It was also a hit in Ireland, New Zealand, Belgium, the Netherlands and Scandinavia and sold more than a million copies.

Keeley was part of the group the Star Sisters which was popular in the Netherlands during the 1980s. She also worked as radio presenter at the Dutch regional broadcaster Radio Rijnmond.

== Discography ==
=== Singles ===
Year	Single	Peak chart positions	
Year	Single	UK	NED
1971	"One Way Ticket" (as Ivy Christie)	―	―
1974	"Tumbling Down"	―	―
1975	"Concrete and Clay"	―	―
1977	"If I Had Words" (with Scott Fitzgerald)	3	1
1978	"We Got Love" (with Steve Flanagan)	—	―
1981	"Thank You"	—	―
1982	"Dim the Light"	—	―
1992	"United We Stand" (with Scott Fitzgerald)	—	―
2010	"If I Had Words" (2010 re-recording) (with Scott Fitzgerald)	—	65
"—" denotes releases that did not chart or were not released.
