= Stars on 45 discography =

Discography

- Studio albums: 5
- Compilation albums: 12
- Singles: 19
- Video albums: 1

This is the discography of Dutch novelty pop group Stars on 45, also known as 'Stars On' in the US and 'Starsound' in the UK.

== Albums ==
=== Studio albums ===
Title	Album details	Peak chart positions										Certifications
Title	Album details	NL	AUS	AUT	CAN	GER	NOR	SPA	SWE	UK	US	Certifications
Long Play Album	Released: 6 March 1981; Label: CNR, Radio/Atlantic, CBS; Formats: CD, LP, MC, 8-track, tape (open reel), digital download, streaming; Released as Stars on Long Play in the US, Canada and Japan and Stars on 45 – The Album in the UK	3	1	2	5	1	17	2	15	1	9	CAN: 4× Platinum; GER: Gold; HK: Platinum; NL: Gold; SPA: Gold; NZ: Gold; UK: Gold; US: Gold
Longplay Album – Volume II	Released: 7 August 1981; Label: CNR, Radio/Atlantic, CBS; Formats: CD, LP, MC, 8-track, tape (open reel), digital download, streaming; Released as Stars on Long Play II in the US and Canada and Stars on 45 – The Album – Volume 2 in the UK	13	82	13	13	8	13	5	19	18	120	CAN: 2× Platinum; UK: Gold
The Superstars	Released: March 1982; Label: CNR, Radio/Atlantic, CBS; Formats: CD, LP, MC, 8-track, tape (open reel), digital download, streaming; Released as Stars on Long Play III in the US and Canada and Stars Medley in the UK	22	—	—	43	—	17	—	—	94	163	CAN: Gold
Stars on Frankie	Released: October 1987; Label: CNR; Formats: CD, LP, MC, digital download, streaming	66	—	—	—	—	—	—	—	—	—	
The Club Hits	Released: 1998; Label: Bunny Music, Music Club; Formats: CD, MC, digital download, streaming	—	—	—	—	—	—	—	—	—	—	
"—" denotes releases that did not chart or were not released in that territory.

=== Compilation albums ===
Title	Album details	Peak chart positions	
Title	Album details	NL	GER
Stars on Hits	Released: 1981; Label: Mercury; Formats: LP, MC; Brazil-only release	—	—
Greatest Stars on 45	Released: 1982; Label: CBS, Music for Pleasure/EMI, Canyon International, CNR/Red Bullet, Rock'n Mania/Stardust; Formats: CD, LP, MC; Released as Greatest Stars on 45: The Complete Dance Medley CD in Canada	—	—
Stars on 45	Released: 1987; Label: Old Gold; Formats: CD, LP, MC; UK-only release	—	—
The Very Best Of	Released: August 1991; Label: Arcade; Formats: CD, LP, MC; Released as Megamixes in Australasia	32	—
The Very Best of Stars on 45	Released: 8 December 1994; Label: Music Club; Formats: CD, MC; UK-only release	—	—
The Non-Stop Party Album!	Released: June 1996; Label: Music Club; Formats: CD, MC, digital download, streaming; UK-only release	—	—
Greatest Stars on 45 Vol. 1	Released: 23 October 1996; Label: Victor; Formats: CD; Japan-only release	—	—
Greatest Stars on 45 Vol. 2	Released: 23 October 1996; Label: Victor; Formats: CD; Japan-only release	—	—
The Very Best of Stars on 45	Released: 24 May 2002; Label: Red Bullet; Formats: CD, digital download, streaming; Re-released in 2005 as The Best of Stars on 45 in Germany	—	18
30 Years Anniversary of Stars on 45	Released: 29 April 2011; Label: Red Bullet; Formats: CD; Japan-only release	—	—
The Greatest Stars on 45	Released: 4 December 2012; Label: Dyna Music; Formats: CD; Philippines-only release	—	—
40 Years Anthology	Released: 9 September 2022; Label: Red Bullet; Formats: 2CD, digital download, streaming	—	—
"—" denotes releases that did not chart or were not released in that territory.

=== Video albums ===
Title	Album details
Stars on 45	Released: 1983; Label: MCA Home Video; Formats: VHS, LaserDisc; US-only release

== Singles ==
Title	Year	Peak chart positions											Certifications
Title	Year	NL	AUS	BE (FLA)	CAN	GER	IRE	NZ	SPA	UK	US	US R&B	Certifications
"Stars on 45" (The Beatles and other 1960s tracks)	1981	1	1	1	1	1	1	1	1	2	1	—	CAN: 2× Platinum; GER: Gold; UK: Gold; US: Gold
"Medley II" (The Beatles; US, Canada and Japan-only release)	1981	—	—	—	19	—	—	—	—	—	67	—	
"Beatles/George Harrison Medley" (The Beatles and George Harrison; Australia-only release)	1981	—	73	—	—	—	—	—	—	—	—	—	
"More Stars" (ABBA and other 1960s tracks)	1981	3	26	3	36	2	3	18	4	2	55	—	NL: Gold; UK: Silver
"Volume III" (Star Wars and other hits)	1981	4	—	8	—	17	11	—	—	17	—	—	
"More Stars on 45 II" (ABBA; Canada-only release)	1981	—	—	—	36	—	—	—	—	—	—	—	
"Stars on Stevie" (Stevie Wonder)	1982	7	49	6	45	—	10	31	13	14	28	44	
"The Greatest Rock 'n Roll Band in the World" (The Rolling Stones)	1982	9	—	25	—	—	—	—	—	—	—	—	
"Proudly Presents the Star Sisters" (The Star Sisters)	1983	1	—	1	—	35	—	—	5	80	107	—	NL: Gold
"The Sam & Dave Medley" (featuring Sam & Dave)	1985	—	—	—	—	—	—	—	—	—	—	92	
"Soul Revue" (featuring the New Sam & Dave Revue; 12"-only release)	1985	—	—	—	—	—	—	—	—	—	—	—	
"Stars on Frankie" (Frank Sinatra)	1987	18	—	9	—	—	—	—	—	—	—	—	
"Saturday Night (Is the Loneliest Night of the Week)" (featuring Peter Douglas)	1987	—	—	—	—	—	—	—	—	—	—	—	
"Stars on '89 Remix" (The Beatles; 1989 remix)	1989	66	—	—	—	—	—	—	—	—	—	—	
"Stars on Stevie Megamix" (Stevie Wonder; 1991 re-release)	1991	—	—	—	—	—	—	—	—	—	—	—	
"The Clubhits"	1997	82	—	—	—	—	—	—	—	—	—	—	
"Dance on Stars"	1998	—	—	—	—	—	—	—	—	—	—	—	
"Proudly Presents the Star Sisters" (The Star Sisters; 2007 remix)	2007	87	—	—	—	—	—	—	—	—	—	—	
"45"	2011	—	—	—	—	—	—	—	—	—	—	—	
"—" denotes releases that did not chart or were not released in that territory.
