= The Greatest Rock 'n Roll Band in the World =

- Original Dutch single sleeve

Single by Stars on 45

from the album The Superstars
- B-side: "Don't Give Up" "Beatles Medley" (The Beatles; UK-only)
- Released: June 1982
- Recorded: 1982
- Genre: Disco; pop; rock and roll
- Length: 5:08 (7" version); 9:40 (12" version); 16:02 (album version)
- Label: CNR Records (NL); Radio/Atlantic Records (US); CBS Records (UK)
- Songwriters: Mick Jagger; Keith Richards; Andrew Loog Oldham (album version only); Kenny Young (album version only); Arthur Resnick (album version only); Nanker Phelge (12"/album version only)
- Producer: Jaap Eggermont

Stars on 45 singles chronology
"Stars on Stevie" (1982)	"The Greatest Rock 'n Roll Band in the World" (1982)	"Stars on Frankie" (1987)

Audios
- "The Greatest Rock 'n Roll Band in the World" (original single edit) on YouTube
- "The Greatest Rock'n Roll Band in the World" (original single version) on YouTube
- "The Superstars (The Greatest Rock 'n Roll Band in the World)" (album version) on YouTube

Music video
- "The Greatest Rock'n Roll Band in the World" (TopPop, 1982) on YouTube

"The Greatest Rock 'n Roll Band in the World" (also known as "Stars on 45 III: Rollin' Stars" in the US and "Stars Medley" in the UK) is a song medley released in June 1982 by the Dutch soundalike studio group Stars on 45 (credited to 'Stars On' in the US and 'Starsound' in the UK). It was the second single from the band's third full-length release The Superstars (US title: Stars on Long Play III; UK title: Stars Medley).

"The Greatest Rock 'n Roll Band in the World" medley featured hits by the Rolling Stones, covering the mainpart of the band's career from their 1965 breakthrough with "(I Can't Get No) Satisfaction" via classics like "Under My Thumb", "Miss You", "Sympathy for the Devil" and "Honky Tonk Women" to their then most recent hit "Start Me Up" in the autumn of 1981. The medley had first been released on The Superstars album in its full side-long, twenty-seven titles and sixteen-minute format. The heavily edited five-minute seven-inch version only featured ten of the Rolling Stones titles, while the near ten-minute twelve-inch version included eighteen. The 7" version is commonly found on CD and the full album version was released on CD on the 2011 30th Anniversary best of edition 30 Years Anniversary of Stars on 45 for the first time. The 12" version has not been released on CD (as of yet 2019).

By the release of the Stones medley in June 1982, there were already signs of a backlash against 'copycat medleys' by anonymous studio groups — even with a large number of parodies of the format being released (see Stars on 45 main bio, Similar acts and parodies). The previous single, "Stars on Stevie", had indeed become another hit on both sides of the Atlantic, but the following album had failed to make much of an impact on either the British or the American charts; in the UK, it peaked at #94 and dropped out of the listing after just one week, in the US, the album didn't even register on Billboard's Top 200, and when the Rolling Stones medley single was released it met with the same indifference. While "The Greatest Rock 'n Roll Band in the World" did reach the Top 20 in the Netherlands, peaking at #15, it was the first Stars on 45 single to peak outside the Dutch Top 10 chart. It also failed to chart in both the US and the UK — where it somewhat confusingly was released by CBS under exactly the same title as both the preceding single and the third album; "Stars Medley".

This resulted in producer Jaap Eggermont deciding to change the formula by launching the spin-off group The Star Sisters, fronted by Patricia Paay, Yvonne Keeley and Sylvana van Veen, whose the first single was released under the moniker Stars on 45 Proudly Presents The Star Sisters and topped the Dutch charts. The Star Sisters went on to release three albums and some ten singles in Continental Europe between the years 1983 and 1987 to moderate international success.

== Formats and track listings ==
- Dutch 7" single

Side one

"The Greatest Rock 'n Roll Band In The World" (7" version) - 5:08

All tracks written by Mick Jagger and Keith Richards unless otherwise noted

- "The Stars Will Never Stop" (Eggermont, Duiser)
- "Sympathy for the Devil"
- "Brown Sugar"
- "Jumpin' Jack Flash"
- "Under My Thumb"
- "Honky Tonk Women"
- "Out of Time"
- "Emotional Rescue"
- "She's a Rainbow"
- "Start Me Up"
- "Angie"

Side two

"Don't Give Up" (7" version) (Eggermont, Duiser) - 3:54

- UK 7" single

Side one

"The Greatest Rock 'n Roll Band In The World" (7" version) - 5:08

All tracks written by Mick Jagger and Keith Richards unless otherwise noted

- "The Stars Will Never Stop" (Eggermont, Duiser)
- "Sympathy for the Devil"
- "Brown Sugar"
- "Jumpin' Jack Flash"
- "Under My Thumb"
- "Honky Tonk Women"
- "Out of Time"
- "Emotional Rescue"
- "She's a Rainbow"
- "Start Me Up"
- "Angie"

Side two

"Beatles Medley" (7" version) - 5:25

All tracks written by John Lennon and Paul McCartney unless otherwise noted

- "Stars on 45" (Eggermont, Duiser)
- "Good Day Sunshine"
- "My Sweet Lord" (Harrison)
- "Here Comes the Sun" (Harrison)
- "While My Guitar Gently Weeps" (Harrison)
- "Taxman" (Harrison)
- "A Hard Day's Night"
- "Things We Said Today"
- "If I Fell"
- "You Can't Do That"
- "Please Please Me"
- "From Me to You"
- "I Want to Hold Your Hand"
- "Stars on 45" (Eggermont, Duiser)
- Dutch 12" single

Side one

"The Greatest Rock 'n Roll Band In The World" (12" version) - 9:40

All tracks written by Mick Jagger and Keith Richards unless otherwise noted

- "The Stars Will Never Stop" (Eggermont, Duiser)
- "Sympathy for the Devil"
- "Stars On Jingle" (Eggermont, Duiser)
- "Brown Sugar"
- "Jumpin' Jack Flash"
- "Take It or Leave It"
- "Under My Thumb"
- "Honky Tonk Women"
- "Lady Jane"
- "(I Can't Get No) Satisfaction"
- "Get off of My Cloud"
- "Stars On Jingle" (Eggermont, Duiser)
- "Out of Time"
- "Tell Me (You're Coming Back)"
- "We Love You"
- "Play with Fire" (Nanker Phelge)
- "It's Only Rock 'n Roll"
- "Emotional Rescue"
- "She's a Rainbow"
- "Start Me Up"
- "Angie"

Side two

"Don't Give Up" (12" version) (Eggermont, Duiser) - 5:37

- Album version from The Superstars

Side one

"The Greatest Rock 'n Roll Band In The World" (album version) - 16:02

All tracks written by Mick Jagger and Keith Richards unless otherwise noted

- "The Stars Will Never Stop" (Eggermont, Duiser)
- "Sympathy for the Devil"
- "Miss You"
- "As Tears Go By" (Jagger, Richards, Oldham)
- "Brown Sugar"
- "Jumpin' Jack Flash"
- "Take It or Leave It"
- "Under My Thumb"
- "Honky Tonk Women"
- "Lady Jane"
- "(I Can't Get No) Satisfaction"
- "Get off of My Cloud"
- "Stars On Jingle" (Eggermont, Duiser)
- "Under the Boardwalk" (Young, Resnick)
- "Out of Time"
- "Gimme Shelter"
- "Let's Spend the Night Together"
- "Tell Me (You're Coming Back)"
- "We Love You"
- "Play with Fire" (Nanker Phelge)
- "It's Only Rock 'n Roll"
- "Ruby Tuesday"
- "Star Star"
- "Emotional Rescue"
- "She's a Rainbow"
- "Start Me Up"
- "Angie"
- Digital download

1. "The Greatest Rock 'n Roll Band In The World" (7" version) - 5:08

All tracks written by Mick Jagger and Keith Richards unless otherwise noted

- "The Stars Will Never Stop" (Eggermont, Duiser)
- "Sympathy for the Devil"
- "Brown Sugar"
- "Jumpin' Jack Flash"
- "Under My Thumb"
- "Honky Tonk Women"
- "Out of Time"
- "Emotional Rescue"
- "She's a Rainbow"
- "Start Me Up"
- "Angie"

2. "Don't Give Up" (12" version) (Eggermont, Duiser) - 5:37

== Charts ==
Chart (1982)	Peak position
The Netherlands (Top 40)	15
The Netherlands	25

== Sources and external links ==
- Mawer, Sharon. Biography of Stars on 45/Starsound at AllMusic. Retrieved 2012-04025.
- Stars on 45 discography at Discogs
- Rateyourmusic.com biography and discography
- The Dutch Stars on 45 fansite
- Top40.nl
- Dutch Charts, Dutch Hitparade and Belgian Charts
- The Greatest Rock 'n Roll Band in the World at Discogs (list of releases)
