= Longplay Album – Volume II =

- Standard artwork

Studio album by Stars on 45
- Released: August 1981
- Recorded: 1981
- Genre: Pop
- Length: 33:37
- Label: CNR Records (NL); Radio Records (US); CBS Records (UK); Carrere (France); Opus (Czechoslovakia); Mercury Records (Argentina, Mexico, Brazil, Uruguay, Philippines, NZ, AU and Israel)
- Producer: Jaap Eggermont

Stars on 45 chronology
Long Play Album (1981)	Longplay Album – Volume II (1981)	The Superstars (1982)

Longplay Album – Volume II is the second album by the Dutch soundalike studio group Stars on 45, released on the CNR Records label in the Netherlands in August 1981. In the US, the album was retitled Stars on Long Play II, released on Atlantic Records' sublabel Radio Records and credited to 'Stars On'. In the UK and Ireland, the album itself was listed as Stars on 45 Volume 2 or Stars on 45 – The Album – Volume 2, credited to 'Starsound' and released by CBS Records. Just like the first Stars on 45 album Longplay Album – Volume II was also officially released in the Eastern Bloc by state-owned czechoslovak label Opus, credited to Stars on 45, it was released under the title Stars on 45 – Volume II. In the Philippines, the album itself was listed as More Stars! Stars on 45 Volume Two or Stars on 45 Long Play Album – Volume 2 (manufactured and printed in the Philippines by Dyna Products, Inc. under license from PhonoGram International B.V., using the Mercury label).

== Album information ==
The second Stars on 45 single in Europe was entitled "More Stars" and was a five-minute medley of eight hits by ABBA ("Voulez-Vous"/"S.O.S."/"Bang-A-Boomerang"/"Money, Money, Money"/"Knowing Me, Knowing You"/"Fernando"/"The Winner Takes It All"/"Super Trouper"), coupled with a reworked version of the "Stars on 45 Theme" which became another UK #2 hit and indeed a Top 10 hit single in most parts of Europe. The eleven-minute 12" mix of "Volume Two", however, opened with another medley which combined excerpts from the 60's and 70's hits mainly from the soul, R&B and folk rock genres: The Temptations' "Papa Was a Rolling Stone", Sly & the Family Stone's "Dance to the Music", The Rubettes' "Sugar Baby Love", The Flower Pot Men's "Let's Go to San Francisco", America's "A Horse with No Name", The Mamas & the Papas' "Monday Monday" and "California Dreamin'", Scott McKenzie's "San Francisco", Barry McGuire's "Eve of Destruction", Smokey Robinson & the Miracles' "Tears of a Clown", The Supremes' "Stop in the Name of Love", Neil Diamond's "Cracklin' Rosie", Manfred Mann's "Do-Wah-Diddy-Diddy", The Toys' "A Lover's Concerto", Four Tops' "Reach Out I'll Be There" and finally, Simon & Garfunkel's "Sound of Silence". In the US, where ABBA's popularity wasn't on the same scale as in Europe or most other parts of the world at the time, Radio Records instead chose the first part of the medley, starting with "Papa Was a Rolling Stone", and released it as the follow-up to the second Beatles medley "Stars on 45 Medley 2", but under the same title: "More Stars". The 12" mix of "Volume Two" or "Stars on 45 Vol. 2", as it was renamed in the UK, was the same on both sides of the Atlantic.

For the creation of the second Stars on 45 full-length release producer Jaap Eggermont, repeated the process from the previous album by dividing the 12" mix of "Volume Two" into two parts. The ABBA medley was extended with another six titles and placed on Side two followed by a seven-minute extended version of the "More Stars" single's B-side, "'45 Stars Get Ready", written by Eggermont himself and musical arranger Martin Duiser and featured an entirely new instrumental part which later on would be released as the B-side of "Volume III" ("Star Wars and Other Hits") and would be renamed "Stars on Theme".

The soul/R&B/folk rock part of the 12" "More Stars" medley was placed as track two on Side one, with two of the titles, the Motown hits "Tears of a Clown" and "Stop in the Name of Love", reshuffled and moved to the end and thus, musically connecting with the newly recorded "Supremes Medley". The European editions of Longplay Album – Volume II listed these as two separate medleys on the album covers, but they had in fact been re-edited into one non-stop track with a total running time of 12:35 and was listed as such on the US edition. Despite the fact that "Supremes Medley" appears on a number of best of compilations with Stars on 45, it was never issued as a single in either Europe or the US or anywhere else, because Motown Records in 1981 seized the opportunity and re-issued the 1978 medley "Diana Ross & the Supremes Medley of Hits", which featured six original Supremes recordings, overdubbed with a similar disco arrangement. The Stars on 45's "Supremes Medley" consequently remained an album track.

The opening title "Star Wars and Other Hits" (on the US edition renamed "Introductions" and placed as the closing track on Side one and on the UK edition renamed "The Instrumental Medley"), strung together an assortment of instrumental intros to songs from a wide variety of genres, from a well-known movie themes like "Star Wars" and "The Good, the Bad and the Ugly", TV sitcom theme like "M*A*S*H", the main theme from Jeff Wayne's musical version of "The War of the Worlds", the overture from The Who's musical "Tommy", the 60's and 70's hits like The Walker Brothers' "The Sun Ain't Gonna Shine Anymore", The Stylistics' "Can't Give You Anything (But My Love)", Derek and the Dominos' "Layla"(*), Free's "All Right Now", The Pointer Sisters' "Fire" and Gerry Rafferty's "Baker Street", disco hits like Carl Douglas' "Kung-Fu Fighting", Rod Stewart's "Do You Think I'm Sexy", Boney M.'s "Ma Baker"(*) (featuring an uncredited spoken cameo by Dutch-American DJ Adam Curry), Village People's "Y.M.C.A.", Michael Jackson's "Don't Stop (Till You Get Enough)"(*) and Foxy's "Get Off" right up to Kim Carnes' "Bette Davis' Eyes"(*) which had been a #1 hit in the US and most other parts of the world only a few months earlier. The intros medley was released as the third Stars on 45 single in Europe in late 1981 under the title "Volume III" (in the UK as "Stars on 45 Vol. 3" by Starsound) and became their third UK Top 20 hit, peaking at #17. Unlike the two previous 12" releases with Stars on 45, it did not feature additional tracks, but had an extended break combining the Stars on 45 theme song with Foxy's "Get Off". The 12" version lists 5:57, 47 seconds longer than the album version. The B-side was entitled "Stars on Theme", an alternate mix of an instrumental part from the album version of "'45 Stars Get Ready", and expanded with the same extended break that featured on the A-side of "Volume III", including the reference to Foxy's "Get Off".

(*) = not included on the US release "Introductions".

The Longplay Album – Volume II/Stars on Long Play II/Stars on 45 – The Album – Volume 2 album in its entirety and in its original form, including single B-sides was reissued digitally in September 2021.

== Track listing ==
Side one

1. "Star Wars and Other Hits" (aka "Star Wars Medley") (US title: "Introductions"; UK title: "The Instrumental Medley") – 5:14 (US: 4:32)

- "Star Wars Main Title" (Williams)
- "Can't Give You Anything (But My Love)" (Creatore, Weiss, Peretti)
- "Kung-Fu Fighting" (Douglas)
- "Layla" (Gordon, Clapton - omitted on the US version)
- "All Right Now" (Rodgers, Fraser)
- "Fire" (Springsteen)
- "Do You Think I'm Sexy" (Stewart, Appice)
- "Ma Baker" (Farian, Reyam, Jay) - omitted on the US version)
- "Y.M.C.A." (Morali, Belolo, Willis)
- "The Good, the Bad, and the Ugly" (Morricone)
- "Don't Stop (Till You Get Enough)" (Jackson - omitted on the US version)
- "Theme from M.A.S.H. (Suicide Is Painless)" (Mandel, Altman)
- "The Sun Ain't Gonna Shine Anymore" (Crewe, Gaudio)
- "Overture from Tommy" (Townshend)
- "Get Off" (Driggs, Ledersma)
- "Stars on 45" (Eggermont, Duiser)
- "Baker Street" (Rafferty)
- "Bette Davis' Eyes" (DeShannon, Weiss - omitted on the US version)
- "Eve of the War" (Wayne)

2. "Sixties Medley" (US title: "More Stars"; UK title: "The 60's Medley") – 6:11

- "Stars on 45 (2)" (Eggermont, Duiser)
- "Papa Was a Rollin' Stone" (Whitfield)
- "Dance to the Music" (Stewart)
- "Sugar Baby Love" (Bickerton, Waddington)
- "Papa Was a Rollin' Stone" (Whitfield)
- "Let's Go to San Francisco" (Carter and Lewis)
- "A Horse with No Name" (Bunnell)
- "Monday Monday" (Phillips)
- "San Francisco" (Phillips)
- "California Dreamin'" (Phillips)
- "Eve of Destruction" (Sloan)
- "Cracklin' Rosie" (Diamond)
- "Do-Wah-Diddy-Diddy" (Barry, Greenwich)
- "A Lover's Concerto" (Linzer, Randell)
- "Reach Out I'll Be There" (Holland–Dozier–Holland)
- "Sound of Silence" (Simon)

3. "Supremes Medley" (UK title: "The Supremes Medley") – 6:24

All tracks written by Holland–Dozier–Holland unless otherwise noted

- "Tears of a Clown" (Cosby, Robinson, Wonder)
- "Stop In the Name of Love"
- "Love Child" (Sawyer, Taylor, Wilson)
- "Reflections"
- "Someday We'll Be Together" (Beavers, Bristol and Fuqua)
- "Stars on 45" (Eggermont, Duiser)
- "Baby Love"
- "Love Is Here and Now You're Gone"
- "Where Did Our Love Go"
- "I Hear a Symphony"
- "You Keep Me Hanging On"
- "Ain't No Mountain High Enough" (Ashford and Simpson)
- "Stars on 45 (2)" (Eggermont, Duiser)

Side two

1. "ABBA Medley" (aka "More Stars") (US title: "Stars Again") – 8:36

All tracks written by Benny Andersson and Björn Ulvaeus unless otherwise noted

- "Stars on 45 (2)" (Eggermont, Duiser)
- "Voulez-Vous"
- "S.O.S." (Andersson, Ulvaeus, Anderson)
- "Bang-A-Boomerang" (Andersson, Ulvaeus, Anderson)
- "Money, Money, Money"
- "Knowing Me, Knowing You" (Ulvaeus, Andersson, Anderson)
- "Fernando" (Andersson, Ulvaeus, Anderson)
- "The Winner Takes It All"
- "Super Trouper (Long Version)"
- "Stars on 45" (Eggermont, Duiser)
- "Dum Dum Diddle"
- "Lay All Your Love on Me"
- "On and On and On"
- "Super Trouper"
- "Summer Night City"
- "Gimme Gimme Gimme (A Man After Midnight)"
- "Stars on 45 (2)" (Eggermont, Duiser)

2. "'45 Stars Get Ready" (Eggermont, Duiser) – 7:12

== Credits ==
=== Personnel ===
- Adam Curry – spoken vocals, news announcer ("Ma Baker")
- Jody Pijper – vocals
- Maureen Seedorf – vocals (Diana Ross and the Supremes)
- Claudia Hoogendoorn – vocals (Agnetha Fältskog & Anni-Frid Lyngstad)

=== Production ===
- Myosotis – cover design
- Jimmy Gielbert – cover concept (US edition)
- Bob Defrin – art direction (US edition)
- Jaap Eggermont – record producer
- Martin Duiser – musical arranger

== Charts ==
Chart (1981–1982)	Peak position
Australia (Kent Music Report)	82

== Sources and external links ==
- Mawer, Sharon. Biography of Stars on 45/Starsound at AllMusic. Retrieved 2012-04025.
- Stars on 45 discography at Discogs
- Rateyourmusic.com biography and discography
- Dutch biography and discography
- Billboard.com biography and chart history
- Official Charts, UK chart history
- Dutch chart history
- Longplay Album – Volume II at Discogs (list of releases)
