= Stars on Frankie =

Studio album by Stars on 45
- Released: October 1987
- Recorded: 1987
- Studio: Soundpush Studios
- Genre: Pop
- Length: 32:18
- Labels: CNR Records (NL); Carrere (France); Canyon International (Japan); Mercury Records (Greece and AU)
- Producer: Jaap Eggermont

Stars on 45 chronology
| The Superstars (1982) | Stars on Frankie (1987) | The Club Hits (1998) |

Stars on Frankie is the fourth album by the Dutch soundalike studio group Stars on 45, released on the CNR Records label in the Netherlands in 1987. The album was the first proper Stars on 45 project since The Superstars, released some five years earlier, during which time producer Jaap Eggermont, had recorded three albums with spin-off group The Star Sisters.

The Stars on Frankie album featured vocals by Peter Douglas who in 1987 he had won Soundmixshow (the original Dutch format of the TV show Stars in Their Eyes) with his impersonation of Frank Sinatra. While the album revived the Stars on 45 formula of stringing together the recreated songs with an original chorus written by Eggermont and musical arranger Martin Duiser, it was not set to a disco beat but had arrangements fairly true to Sinatra's original recordings, featuring a jazz ensemble with live strings and brass. The title track single became another Top 20 hit in the Netherlands, reaching #16 on the chart, and the album itself was also a modest commercial success, peaking at #59, and was also released in the rest of Continental Europe, Scandinavia, and Japan. Douglas has since had a successful career in music, not just by interpreting Sinatra's repertoire but as a prominent jazz singer in his own right, singing both standards and evergreens as well as original material, releasing a series of albums under his own name and touring in both Europe and the United States.

Stars on Frankie was the final Stars on 45 project to be produced by Jaap Eggermont, the creator of the original concept. A fifth and final studio album called The Club Hits uses both the Stars on 45 name, the original logo on the album cover as well as a re-recording of Eggermont and Duiser's "Stars on 45 Theme", together with medleys of dance hits from the 70's, 80's, and 90's was recorded in 1997 and released by Bunny Music in the Netherlands in 1998 and Demon Music Group's sublabel Music Club International in the UK in 2000 to moderate commercial success. Neither, Eggermont himself nor any of the original Stars on 45 musicians and singers were involved in the Stars on 45: The Club Hits project.

Stars on Frankie is to date the only of the four original Stars on 45 studio albums to have been released to CD. The 12" version of "Stars on Frankie", however has (as of yet 2019), not been released on CD.

== Track listing ==
Side one

1. "Stars on Frankie" - 4:17

- "Stars on Frankie" (Hollestelle, Eggermont)
- "The Lady Is a Tramp" (Rodgers and Hart)
- "I Will Drink the Wine" (Ryan)
- "Witchcraft" (Coleman, Leigh)
- "Something Stupid" (Parks)
- "Nancy (with the Laughing Face)" (van Heusen, Silvers)
- "These Boots Are Made for Walking" (Hazlewood)
- "Let Me Try Again" (Caravelli, Jourdan, Anka, Cahn)
- "Strangers in the Night" (Kaempfert, Singleton, Snyder)
- "My Kind of Town" (van Heusen and Cahn)

2. "The Voice" - 12:03

- "The Voice" (Eggermont, Duiser, Souer)
- "Strangers in the Night" (Kaempfert, Singleton, Snyder)
- "The Voice" (Duiser, Eggermont)
- "My Way" (Revaux, François, Thibaut, Anka)
- "Three Coins in the Fountain" (Styne and Cahn)
- "Talk to Me" (Snyder, Vallee, Kahan)
- "I Believe I'm Gonna Love You" (Sklerov, Lloyd)
- "All the Way" (van Heusen, Cahn)
- "The Voice" (Eggermont, Duiser, Souer)
- "It Was a Very Good Year" (Drake)
- "You My Love" (Gordon, van Heusen)
- "Strangers in the Night" (Kaempfert, Singleton, Snyder)
- "The Voice" (Eggermont, Duiser, Souer)
- "Put Your Dreams Away" (Lowe, Mann, Weill)
- "Love's Been Good To Me" (McKuen)
- "Blue Eyes" (Hollestelle, Eggermont)
- "My Way" (Revaux, François, Thibaut, Anka)

Side two

1. "Saturday Night" - 12:01

- "Introduction" (Eggermont, Hollestelle)
- "Saturday Night (Is the Loneliest Night of the Week)" (Styne, Cahn)
- "Love Is the Tender Trap" (Cahn and van Heusen)
- "I've Got You Under My Skin" (Porter)
- "I Get a Kick out of You" (Porter)
- "Cheek to Cheek" (Berlin)
- "Learnin' the Blues" (Silvers)
- "You're Drivin' Me Crazy" (Donaldson)
- "I'm Gonna Sit Right Down and Write Myself a Letter" (Ahlert, Young)
- "Bad Bad Leroy Brown" (Croce)
- "Chicago" (Fisher)
- "My Blue Heaven" (Donaldson, Whiting)
- "Theme from "New York, New York"" (Ebb/Kander)

2. "Swingtime" (Eggermont, Duiser, Souer, van Eyck) - 4:29

== Credits ==
=== Personnel ===
- Peter Douglas – vocals (Frank Sinatra)

=== Production ===
- Jaap Eggermont – record producer
- Hans Hollestelle – musical arranger
- Martin Duiser – musical arranger

== Sources and external links ==
- Mawer, Sharon. Biography of Stars on 45/Starsound at AllMusic. Retrieved 2012-04025.
- Stars on 45 discography at Discogs
- Rateyourmusic.com biography and discography
- Dutch biography and discography
- Dutch chart history
- Peter Douglas official website
- Stars on Frankie at Discogs (list of releases)
