= Stars on Stevie =

1982 single by Stars on 45

- Original Dutch single sleeve

Single by Stars on 45

from the album The Superstars
- B-side: "It's Not a Wonder, It's a Miracle"
- Released: February 1982; 1991 (1991 re-release)
- Recorded: 1981
- Genre: Disco; pop; soul; rock and roll
- Length: 5:19 (7" version); 7:47 (12"/album version)
- Label: CNR Records (NL); Radio/Atlantic Records (US); CBS Records (UK); Arcade (NL; 1991 re-release)
- Songwriters: Sylvia Moy; Henry Cosby; Stevie Wonder; Ron Miller; Bryan Wells; Lula Hardaway; Orlando Murden; Clarence Paul
- Producer: Jaap Eggermont

Stars on 45 singles chronology
"Volume III" (1981)	"Stars on Stevie" (1982)	"The Greatest Rock 'n Roll Band in the World" (1982)
"Stars on '89 Remix" (1989)	"Stars on Stevie Megamix" (1991)	"The Clubhits" (1997)

Audios
- "Stars on Stevie" (original single edit) on YouTube
- "Stars on Stevie (Wonder)" (original 12 inch version) on YouTube

Music video
- "Stars on Stevie" (TopPop, 1982) on YouTube

"Stars on Stevie" (also known as "Stars on 45 III: A Tribute to Stevie Wonder" in the US and "Stars Medley" in the UK) is a song medley released in February 1982 by the Dutch soundalike studio group Stars on 45 (credited to 'Stars On' in the US and 'Starsound' in the UK). It was the first single from the band's third full-length release The Superstars (US title: Stars on Long Play III; UK title: Stars Medley) and it was the Stars on 45's fourth single release in both Europe and North America.

The "Stars on Stevie" medley featured a selection of songs made famous by Stevie Wonder, ranging from his first US hit "Fingertips" (released in 1963 and credited to Little Stevie Wonder) via classics like "Isn't She Lovely", "You Are the Sunshine of My Life", "Sir Duke" and "Yester-Me, Yester-You, Yesterday" to his then most recent American charttopper "Master Blaster". The soundalike vocals were provided by established Dutch singer Tony Sherman (born Renold Shearman in Curaçao), who had started his career in music as early as in 1970 with Dutch-Caribbean funk band Reality and releasing a series of albums with them before going solo in the late 70s.

"Stars on Stevie" became the highest charting Stars on 45 single in the US since their first charttopping Beatles medley, peaking at #28 on Billboard's Hot 100. In the UK, it became the group's fourth consecutive Top 20 hit, peaking at #14 in February 1982, slightly higher in Ireland at #10 and it was indeed a #20 hit in most parts of Europe. In the Netherlands, "Stars on Stevie" reached #6, making it their fourth Top 10 hit within the space of twelve months.

The "Stars on Stevie" medley was re-issued in 1991 under the title "Stars on Stevie Megamix" on the Arcade label to promote The Very Best of Stars on 45 compilation album and has since appeared on a number of other greatest hits compilations with the group. The only difference between these two versions; however, is the sound of a live audience that has been overdubbed throughout the "Megamix", in all other respects they are in fact identical.

== Formats and track listings ==
- 1982 Dutch, US & UK 7" single

Side one

"Stars on Stevie" (US title: "Stars on 45 III (A Tribute to Stevie Wonder)") (7" version) – 5:19 (US: 4:40)

All tracks written by Stevie Wonder unless otherwise noted

- "Uptight (Everything's Alright)" (Moy, Cosby, Wonder)
- "My Cherie Amour"
- "Yester-Me, Yester-You, Yesterday" (Miller, Wells)
- "Master Blaster"
- "You Are the Sunshine of My Life"
- "Isn't She Lovely"
- "Stars On Jingle" (Eggermont, Duiser)
- "Sir Duke"
- "I Wish"
- "I Was Made to Love Her" (Wonder, Hardaway, Moy, Cosby)
- "For Once in My Life" (Miller, Murden - omitted on the US version)
- "Superstition"
- "Fingertips" (Paul, Cosby)

Side two

"It's Not a Wonder, It's a Miracle" (7" version) (Eggermont, Duiser) – 3:10 For the US 7" single, this track is titled "Stars on Get Ready III"

- 1982 Dutch, US & UK 12" single

Side one

"Stars on Stevie" (US title: "Stars on 45 III: A Tribute to Stevie Wonder") (12" version) – 7:47

All tracks written by Stevie Wonder unless otherwise noted

- "Uptight (Everything's Alright)" (Moy, Cosby, Wonder)
- "My Cherie Amour"
- "Yester-Me, Yester-You, Yesterday" (Miller, Wells)
- "Master Blaster"
- "You Are the Sunshine of My Life"
- "Isn't She Lovely"
- "Stars On Jingle" (Eggermont, Duiser)
- "Sir Duke"
- "I Wish"
- "I Was Made to Love Her" (Wonder, Hardaway, Moy, Cosby)
- "For Once in My Life" (Miller, Murden)
- "Superstition"
- "Sir Duke"
- "Don't You Worry 'bout a Thing"
- "A Place in the Sun" (Miller, Wells)
- "Fingertips" (Paul, Cosby)

Side two

"It's Not a Wonder, It's a Miracle" (12" version) (Eggermont, Duiser) – 7:11 For the US 12" single, this track is titled "Stars on Get Ready III"

- 1991 Dutch 7" single

Side one

"Stars on Stevie Megamix" (radio version) – 5:22

All tracks written by Stevie Wonder unless otherwise noted

- "Uptight (Everything's Alright)" (Moy, Cosby, Wonder)
- "My Cherie Amour"
- "Yester-Me, Yester-You, Yesterday" (Miller, Wells)
- "Master Blaster"
- "You Are the Sunshine of My Life"
- "Isn't She Lovely"
- "Stars On Jingle" (Eggermont, Duiser)
- "Sir Duke"
- "I Wish"
- "I Was Made to Love Her" (Wonder, Hardaway, Moy, Cosby)
- "For Once in My Life" (Miller, Murden)
- "Superstition"
- "Fingertips" (Paul, Cosby)

Side two

"It's Not a Wonder, It's a Miracle" (radio version) (Eggermont, Duiser) – 3:09

- 1991 Dutch 12" maxi single

Side one

"Stars on Stevie Megamix" (long version) – 7:38

All tracks written by Stevie Wonder unless otherwise noted

- "Uptight (Everything's Alright)" (Moy, Cosby, Wonder)
- "My Cherie Amour"
- "Yester-Me, Yester-You, Yesterday" (Miller, Wells)
- "Master Blaster"
- "You Are the Sunshine of My Life"
- "Isn't She Lovely"
- "Stars On Jingle" (Eggermont, Duiser)
- "Sir Duke"
- "I Wish"
- "I Was Made to Love Her" (Wonder, Hardaway, Moy, Cosby)
- "For Once in My Life" (Miller, Murden)
- "Superstition"
- "Sir Duke"
- "Don't You Worry 'bout a Thing"
- "A Place in the Sun" (Miller, Wells)
- "Fingertips" (Paul, Cosby)

Side two

1. Stars on Stevie Megamix" (radio version) – 5:22

All tracks written by Stevie Wonder unless otherwise noted

- "Uptight (Everything's Alright)" (Moy, Cosby, Wonder)
- "My Cherie Amour"
- "Yester-Me, Yester-You, Yesterday" (Miller, Wells)
- "Master Blaster"
- "You Are the Sunshine of My Life"
- "Isn't She Lovely"
- "Stars On Jingle" (Eggermont, Duiser)
- "Sir Duke"
- "I Wish"
- "I Was Made to Love Her" (Wonder, Hardaway, Moy, Cosby)
- "For Once in My Life" (Miller, Murden)
- "Superstition"
- "Fingertips" (Paul, Cosby)

2. "It's Not a Wonder, It's a Miracle" (long version) (Eggermont, Duiser) – 7:11

- 1991 Dutch CD maxi single

1. "Stars on Stevie Megamix" (long version) – 7:38

All tracks written by Stevie Wonder unless otherwise noted

- "Uptight (Everything's Alright)" (Moy, Cosby, Wonder)
- "My Cherie Amour"
- "Yester-Me, Yester-You, Yesterday" (Miller, Wells)
- "Master Blaster"
- "You Are the Sunshine of My Life"
- "Isn't She Lovely"
- "Stars On Jingle" (Eggermont, Duiser)
- "Sir Duke"
- "I Wish"
- "I Was Made to Love Her" (Wonder, Hardaway, Moy, Cosby)
- "For Once in My Life" (Miller, Murden)
- "Superstition"
- "Sir Duke"
- "Don't You Worry 'bout a Thing"
- "A Place in the Sun" (Miller, Wells)
- "Fingertips" (Paul, Cosby)

2. Stars on Stevie Megamix" (radio version) – 5:22

All tracks written by Stevie Wonder unless otherwise noted

- "Uptight (Everything's Alright)" (Moy, Cosby, Wonder)
- "My Cherie Amour"
- "Yester-Me, Yester-You, Yesterday" (Miller, Wells)
- "Master Blaster"
- "You Are the Sunshine of My Life"
- "Isn't She Lovely"
- "Stars On Jingle" (Eggermont, Duiser)
- "Sir Duke"
- "I Wish"
- "I Was Made to Love Her" (Wonder, Hardaway, Moy, Cosby)
- "For Once in My Life" (Miller, Murden)
- "Superstition"
- "Fingertips" (Paul, Cosby)

== Charts ==
=== Weekly charts ===
Chart (1982)	Peak position
Australia (Kent Music Report)	49
Belgium (Ultratop 50 Flanders)	6
Canada Top Singles (RPM)	45
Canada Adult Contemporary (RPM)	7
Denmark (IFPI)	14
Ireland (IRMA)	10
Italy (Musica e dischi)	15
Netherlands (Dutch Top 40)	6
Netherlands (Single Top 100)	7
New Zealand (Recorded Music NZ)	31
Spain (AFYVE)	13
UK Singles (Official Charts)	14
US Billboard Hot 100	28
US Adult Contemporary (Billboard)	31
US Hot R&B/Hip-Hop Songs (Billboard)	44
US Cash Box Top 100	40

=== Year-end charts ===
Chart (1982)	Position
Belgium (Ultratop 50 Flanders)	69
Netherlands (Dutch Top 40)	57
Netherlands (Single Top 100)	86

== Sources and external links ==
- Mawer, Sharon. Biography of Stars on 45/Starsound at AllMusic. Retrieved 2012-04025.
- Stars on 45 discography at Discogs
- Rateyourmusic.com biography and discography
- The Dutch Stars on 45 fansite
- Dutch Top 40
- UK Top 40
- Irish Charts.ie
- Stars on Stevie at Discogs (list of releases)
