= List of Cash Box Top 100 number-one singles of 1981 =

These are the number-one hits on the Top 100 Singles chart in 1981 as published by Cash Box magazine.

Key
†	Indicates best-performing single of 1981

Issue date	Song	Artist
January 3	"(Just Like) Starting Over"	John Lennon
January 10	"(Just Like) Starting Over"	John Lennon
January 17	"(Just Like) Starting Over"	John Lennon
January 24	"(Just Like) Starting Over"	John Lennon
January 31	"The Tide Is High"	Blondie
February 7	"The Tide Is High"	Blondie
February 14	"Celebration"	Kool & the Gang
February 21	"I Love a Rainy Night"	Eddie Rabbitt
February 28	"9 to 5"	Dolly Parton
March 7	"Keep on Loving You"	REO Speedwagon
March 14	"Woman"	John Lennon
March 21	"Woman"	John Lennon
March 28	"Rapture"	Blondie
April 4	"Rapture"	Blondie
April 11	"Kiss on My List"	Daryl Hall and John Oates
April 18	"Morning Train (Nine to Five)"	Sheena Easton
April 25	"Morning Train (Nine to Five)"	Sheena Easton
May 2	"Morning Train (Nine to Five)"	Sheena Easton
May 9	"Morning Train (Nine to Five)"	Sheena Easton
May 16	"Morning Train (Nine to Five)"	Sheena Easton
May 23	"Being With You"	Smokey Robinson
May 30	"Bette Davis Eyes"	Kim Carnes
June 6	"Bette Davis Eyes"	Kim Carnes
June 13	"Bette Davis Eyes"	Kim Carnes
June 20	"Medley: Intro Venus / Sugar Sugar / No Reply / I'll Be Back / Drive My Car / Do You Want To Know a Secret / We Can Work It Out / I Should Have Known Better / Nowhere Man / You're Going To Lose That Girl / Stars on 45"	Stars on 45
June 27	"Medley: Intro Venus / Sugar Sugar / No Reply / I'll Be Back / Drive My Car / Do You Want To Know a Secret / We Can Work It Out / I Should Have Known Better / Nowhere Man / You're Going To Lose That Girl / Stars on 45"	Stars on 45
July 4	"Bette Davis Eyes"	Kim Carnes
July 11	"Bette Davis Eyes"	Kim Carnes
July 18	"The One That You Love"	Air Supply
July 25	"Jessie's Girl"	Rick Springfield
August 1	"Elvira"	Oak Ridge Boys
August 8	"Theme From “Greatest American Hero"	Joey Scarbury
August 15	"Endless Love" †	Diana Ross and Lionel Richie
August 22	"Endless Love" †	Diana Ross and Lionel Richie
August 29	"Endless Love" †	Diana Ross and Lionel Richie
September 5	"Endless Love" †	Diana Ross and Lionel Richie
September 12	"Endless Love" †	Diana Ross and Lionel Richie
September 19	"Endless Love" †	Diana Ross and Lionel Richie
September 26	"Endless Love" †	Diana Ross and Lionel Richie
October 3	"Endless Love" †	Diana Ross and Lionel Richie
October 10	"Endless Love" †	Diana Ross and Lionel Richie
October 17	"Arthur's Theme (Best That You Can Do)"	Christopher Cross
October 24	"Arthur's Theme (Best That You Can Do)"	Christopher Cross
October 31	"Arthur's Theme (Best That You Can Do)"	Christopher Cross
November 7	"Arthur's Theme (Best That You Can Do)"	Christopher Cross
November 14	"Private Eyes"	Daryl Hall and John Oates
November 21	"Physical"	Olivia Newton-John
November 28	"Physical"	Olivia Newton-John
December 5	"Physical"	Olivia Newton-John
December 12	"Physical"	Olivia Newton-John
December 19	"Physical"	Olivia Newton-John
December 26	"Physical"	Olivia Newton-John

== See also ==
- 1981 in music
- List of Hot 100 number-one singles of 1981 (U.S.)
