= Stars on Frankie (song) =

Single by Stars on 45

from the album Stars on Frankie
- Released: February 1987
- Recorded: 1987
- Genre: Pop
- Length: 4:17/6:33
- Label: CNR Records (NL)
- Songwriter: See track listing for full details
- Producer: Jaap Eggermont

Stars on 45 singles chronology
"The Greatest Rock 'n Roll Band in the World" (1982)	"Stars on Frankie" (1987)

"Stars on Frankie" is a song issued in 1987 by the Dutch studio group Stars on 45, taken from the album of the same title.

"Stars on Frankie" was the first proper Stars on 45 single since 1982's Rolling Stones medley "The Greatest Rock 'n Roll Band in the World". Since then, producer Jaap Eggermont had recorded three albums with spin-off group The Star Sisters, mainly covering songs made famous by the Andrews Sisters and other jazz standards and evergreens from the 1940s, 1950s and early 1960s. When singer Peter Douglas in early 1987 won the Dutch soundalike contest Soundmixshow (the original Dutch format of TV show Stars in Their Eyes) with his impersonation of Frank Sinatra, Eggermont consequently contacted him offering him a recording contract. The result was the "Stars on Frankie" single and album, released under the 'Stars on 45' moniker. While the single failed to chart internationally it became another Top 20 hit in the Netherlands, peaking at #16 and the following album was also a minor commercial success, reaching the lower regions of the Dutch albums chart and it was subsequently also released in the rest of Continental Europe, Scandinavia and Japan.

Stars on Frankie became the final original Stars on 45 project to be produced by Jaap Eggermont. A single and an album titled Stars on 45 - The Club Hits was some ten years later released on the Music Club International label, featuring both re-recordings of Eggermont and musical arranger Martin Duiser's original "Stars on 45" themes together with newly recorded hits medleys as well as using the band logo on the album covers. Neither Eggermont, Duiser nor any of the original Stars on 45 musicians or singers were however involved in the creation of this project.

== Track listing 7" single ==
=== Side A ===
"Stars on Frankie" - 4:17

- "Stars On Frankie" (Hollestelle, Eggermont)
- "The Lady Is A Tramp" (Rodgers, Hart)
- "I Will Drink the Wine" (Ryan)
- "Witchcraft" (Coleman, Leigh)
- "Something Stupid" (Parks)
- "Nancy (With The Laughing Face)" (van Heusen, Silvers)
- "These Boots Are Made For Walking" (Hazlewood)
- "Let Me Try Again" (Caravelli, Jourdan, Anka, Cahn)
- "Strangers In The Night" (Kaempfert, Singleton, Snyder)
- "My Kind of Town" (van Heusen, Cahn)

=== Side B ===
"Swingtime" (van Eick, Eggermont, Duiser, Souer) - 4:29

== Track listing 12" single ==
=== Side A ===
"Stars on Frankie" (12" Mix) - 6:33

- "Swingtime" (van Eick, Eggermont, Duiser, Souer)
- "Stars On Frankie" (Hollestelle, Eggermont)
- "The Lady Is A Tramp" (Rodgers, Hart)
- "Swingtime" (van Eick, Eggermont, Duiser, Souer)
- "I Will Drink the Wine" (Ryan)
- "Witchcraft" (Coleman, Leigh)
- "Something Stupid" (Parks)
- "Nancy (With The Laughing Face)" (van Heusen, Silvers)
- "These Boots Are Made For Walking" (Hazlewood)
- "Swingtime" (van Eick, Eggermont, Duiser, Souer)
- "Let Me Try Again" (Caravelli, Jourdan, Anka, Cahn)
- "Strangers In The Night" (Kaempfert, Singleton, Snyder)
- "My Kind of Town" (van Heusen, Cahn)

=== Side B ===
"Swingtime" (van Eick, Eggermont, Duiser, Souer) - 4:29

== Chart peaks ==
Chart (1987)	Peak Position
The Netherlands	16

== Sources and external links ==
- Mawer, Sharon. Biography of Stars on 45/Starsound at AllMusic. Retrieved 2012-04025.
- Stars on 45 discography at Discogs
- Rateyourmusic.com biography and discography
- The Dutch Stars on 45 fansite
- Top40.nl
