= List of Billboard Hot 100 number ones of 1981 =

Olivia Newton-John's "Physical" spent the final six weeks of 1981 at number one an ultimately tied the record for the longest-running Hot 100 number one.

The Billboard Hot 100 is a chart published since August 1958 by Billboard magazine which ranks the best-performing singles in the United States. In 1981, it was compiled based on a combination of sales and airplay data sourced from surveys of retail outlets and playlists submitted by radio stations, respectively. During the year, 17 different singles spent time at number one.

The year's first chart-topper was "(Just Like) Starting Over" by John Lennon, which had moved into the top spot in the issue of Billboard dated December 27. It was the first new song released by Lennon since 1975 and was intended to be the start of a comeback for the singer, but it proved to be a posthumous number one after he was murdered on December 8, 1980. In the issue dated February 21, the country music singer Dolly Parton topped the Hot 100 for the first time with "9 to 5". A week later, it was displaced by another country song, "I Love a Rainy Night" by Eddie Rabbitt. It was the first Hot 100 number one for Rabbitt and marked the only occasion during the 1980s when two consecutive number ones were both country songs. The Scottish singer Sheena Easton gained her first number one in May with "Morning Train (9 to 5)". In her native United Kingdom, the song had been a top ten success under the title "9 to 5", but it was given a new title for the U.S. market to avoid confusion with Parton's identically titled song. In June, Stars on 45, a Dutch studio-based group consisting of session singers, topped the Hot 100 for the first and only time with a medley of soundalike versions of songs from the 1960s, predominantly tracks originally recorded by the Beatles. In other territories, the single was also entitled "Stars on 45", but for legal reasons it was released in the United States under a title incorporating the names of all the songs included in the medley. (Note: The official title of the single in the United States was "Medley: Intro 'Venus' / Sugar, Sugar / No Reply / I'll Be Back / Drive My Car / Do You Want to Know a Secret / We Can Work It Out / I Should Have Known Better / Nowhere Man / You're Going to Lose That Girl / Stars on 45".) Its 41-word title set a new record for the longest of any song to enter the Hot 100. Other acts that hit number one for the first time in 1981 were Kool & the Gang, REO Speedwagon, Kim Carnes, Air Supply, and Rick Springfield.

The final number-one single of 1981 was "Physical" by Olivia Newton-John which reached the top of the chart in the issue of Billboard dated November 21; it held the top spot for the final six weeks of 1981. It remained at number one for four further weeks in 1982, tying the record set by Debby Boone's "You Light Up My Life" in 1977 for the longest-running chart-topper in the history of the Hot 100. Newton-John retained her share of the record until 1992, when "End of the Road" by Boyz II Men spent 13 weeks at number one. The longest run at number one wholly within 1981 was the nine weeks which "Endless Love" by Diana Ross and Lionel Richie spent atop the chart; it tied for the most weeks in the peak position during the year with "Bette Davis Eyes" by Carnes, which also spent nine weeks at number one but in two separate runs. "Endless Love" was the first solo chart-topper for Richie, who had previously reached number one as a member of Commodores. Blondie and Daryl Hall & John Oates were the only acts to take more than one single to number one during the year; both acts had two singles reach the top spot. Blondie's "Rapture", a number one in March and April, is notable as the first Hot 100 number one to feature rapping, performed by the group's lead singer Debbie Harry; at the time rapping was mainly an underground artform and little known in the mainstream.

== Chart history ==
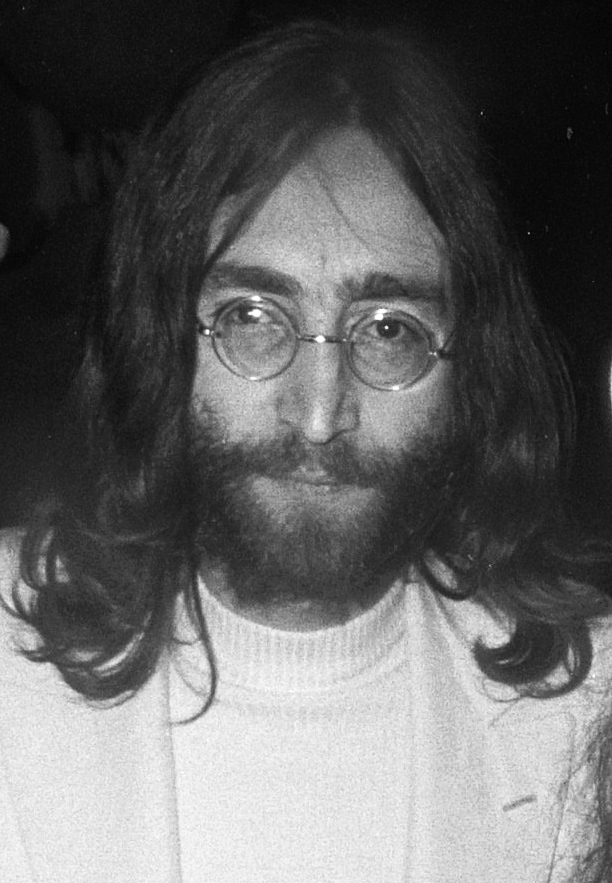
John Lennon (pictured in 1969), who had died the previous December, began the year at number one with "(Just Like) Starting Over".

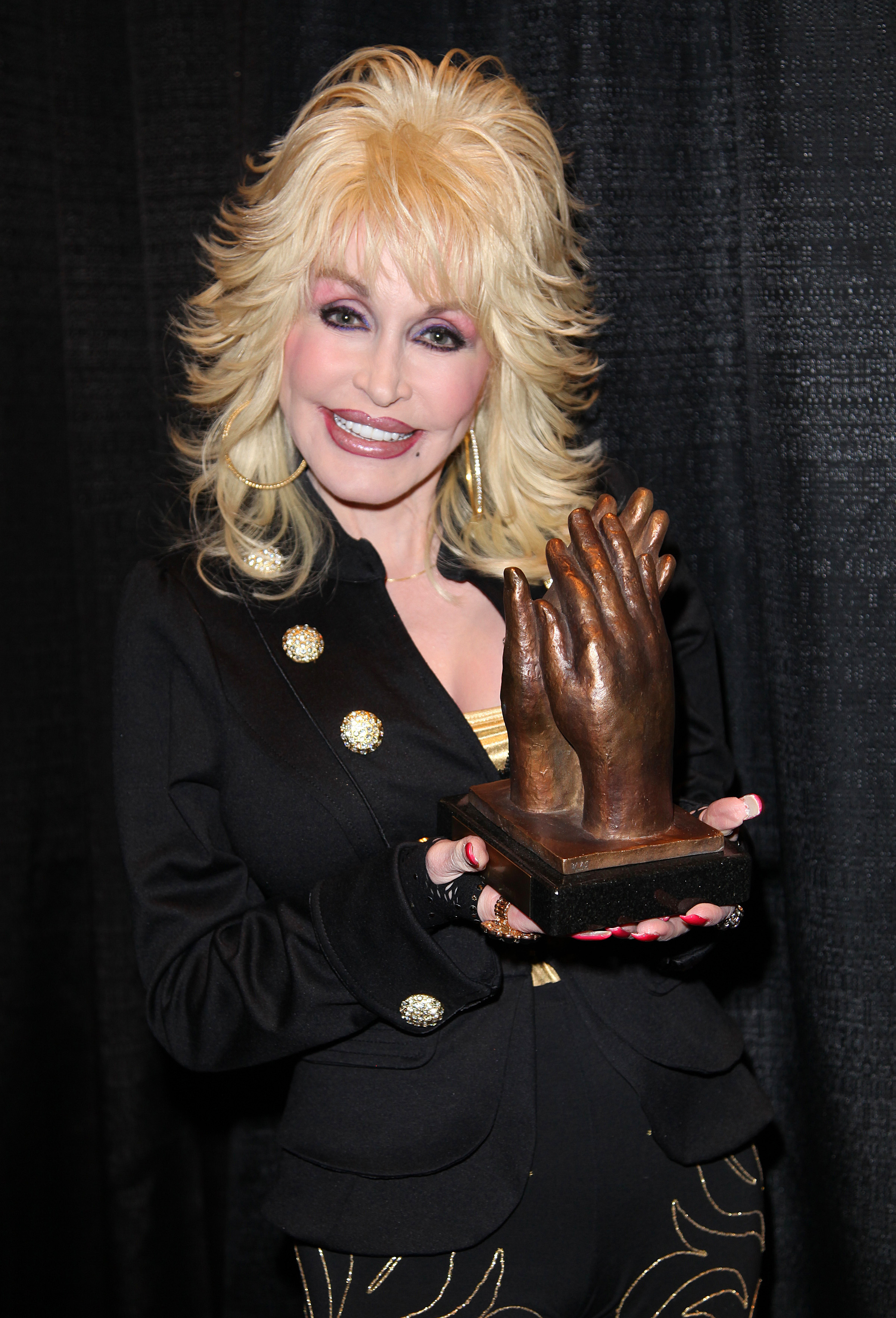
"9 to 5" by Dolly Parton (pictured in 2010) reached the top spot for two non-consecutive weeks.

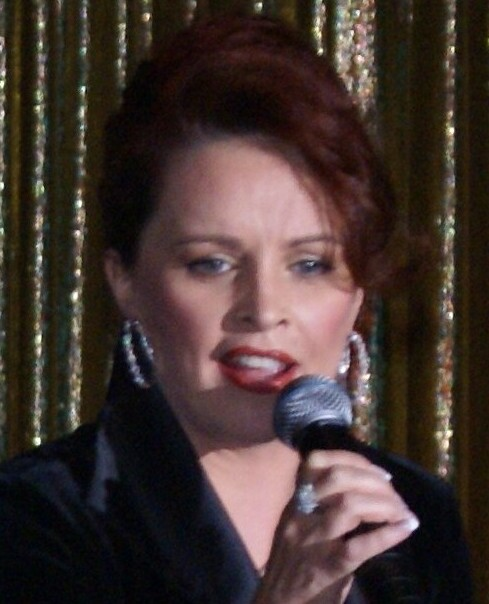
"9 to 5" by Sheena Easton (pictured in 2009) was retitled "Morning Train (Nine to Five)" in the United States to avoid confusion with Parton's song.

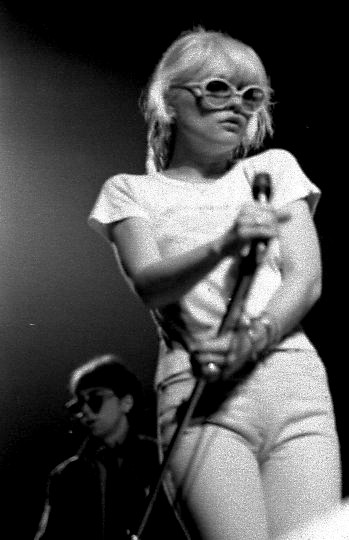
Debbie Harry of Blondie was the first performer to rap on a Hot 100 number one.

Chart history
No. (Note: The "No." column indicates the numerical sequence of number ones in Hot 100 history. "Re" indicates a single returning to number one.)	Issue date	Title	Artist(s)	Ref.
495	January 3 (Note: This was an unpublished week, due to a special double issue that Billboard published in print the previous week. All positions on the Hot 100 were "frozen" during the break.)	"(Just Like) Starting Over"	John Lennon	
495	January 10	"(Just Like) Starting Over"	John Lennon	
495	January 17	"(Just Like) Starting Over"	John Lennon	
495	January 24	"(Just Like) Starting Over"	John Lennon	
496	January 31	"The Tide Is High"	Blondie	
497	February 7	"Celebration"	Kool & the Gang	
497	February 14	"Celebration"	Kool & the Gang	
498	February 21	"9 to 5"	Dolly Parton	
499	February 28	"I Love a Rainy Night"	Eddie Rabbitt	
499	March 7	"I Love a Rainy Night"	Eddie Rabbitt	
498 (re)	March 14	"9 to 5"	Dolly Parton	
500	March 21	"Keep On Loving You"	REO Speedwagon	
501	March 28	"Rapture"	Blondie	
501	April 4	"Rapture"	Blondie	
502	April 11	"Kiss on My List"	Daryl Hall & John Oates	
502	April 18	"Kiss on My List"	Daryl Hall & John Oates	
502	April 25	"Kiss on My List"	Daryl Hall & John Oates	
503	May 2	"Morning Train (Nine to Five)"	Sheena Easton	
503	May 9	"Morning Train (Nine to Five)"	Sheena Easton	
504	May 16	"Bette Davis Eyes"	Kim Carnes	
504	May 23	"Bette Davis Eyes"	Kim Carnes	
504	May 30	"Bette Davis Eyes"	Kim Carnes	
504	June 6	"Bette Davis Eyes"	Kim Carnes	
504	June 13	"Bette Davis Eyes"	Kim Carnes	
505	June 20	"Medley"	Stars on 45	
504 (re)	June 27	"Bette Davis Eyes"	Kim Carnes	
504 (re)	July 4	"Bette Davis Eyes"	Kim Carnes	
504 (re)	July 11	"Bette Davis Eyes"	Kim Carnes	
504 (re)	July 18	"Bette Davis Eyes"	Kim Carnes	
506	July 25	"The One That You Love"	Air Supply	
507	August 1	"Jessie's Girl"	Rick Springfield	
507	August 8	"Jessie's Girl"	Rick Springfield	
508	August 15	"Endless Love"	Diana Ross and Lionel Richie	
508	August 22	"Endless Love"	Diana Ross and Lionel Richie	
508	August 29	"Endless Love"	Diana Ross and Lionel Richie	
508	September 5	"Endless Love"	Diana Ross and Lionel Richie	
508	September 12	"Endless Love"	Diana Ross and Lionel Richie	
508	September 19	"Endless Love"	Diana Ross and Lionel Richie	
508	September 26	"Endless Love"	Diana Ross and Lionel Richie	
508	October 3	"Endless Love"	Diana Ross and Lionel Richie	
508	October 10	"Endless Love"	Diana Ross and Lionel Richie	
509	October 17	"Arthur's Theme (Best That You Can Do)"	Christopher Cross	
509	October 24	"Arthur's Theme (Best That You Can Do)"	Christopher Cross	
509	October 31	"Arthur's Theme (Best That You Can Do)"	Christopher Cross	
510	November 7	"Private Eyes"	Daryl Hall & John Oates	
510	November 14	"Private Eyes"	Daryl Hall & John Oates	
511	November 21	"Physical"	Olivia Newton-John	
511	November 28	"Physical"	Olivia Newton-John	
511	December 5	"Physical"	Olivia Newton-John	
511	December 12	"Physical"	Olivia Newton-John	
511	December 19	"Physical"	Olivia Newton-John	
511	December 26	"Physical"	Olivia Newton-John	

== Number-one artists ==
List of number-one artists by total weeks at number one
Weeks at No. 1	Artist
9	Kim Carnes
9	Diana Ross
9	Lionel Richie
6	Olivia Newton-John
5	Daryl Hall & John Oates
4	John Lennon
3	Blondie
3	Christopher Cross
2	Kool & the Gang
2	Eddie Rabbitt
2	Dolly Parton
2	Sheena Easton
2	Rick Springfield
1	REO Speedwagon
1	Stars on 45
1	Air Supply

== See also ==
- 1981 in music
- Cashbox Top 100 number-one singles of 1981
- List of Billboard number-one singles
- List of Billboard 200 number-one albums of 1981
- List of Billboard Hot 100 number-one singles of the 1980s
