= Long Play Album =

- Standard artwork

Studio album by Stars on 45
- Released: March 1981
- Recorded: 1980–1981
- Genre: Pop
- Length: 33:17
- Labels: CNR Records (NL); Radio/Atlantic Records (US); CBS Records (UK); Carrere (France); Melodiya (USSR); Opus (Czechoslovakia); Mercury Records (Argentina, Singapore, Malaysia, Hong Kong, Philippines, NZ, AU and Israel)
- Producer: Jaap Eggermont

Stars on 45 chronology
Long Play Album (1981)	Longplay Album – Volume II (1981)

Long Play Album is the first album by the Dutch soundalike studio group Stars on 45, released on the CNR Records label in the Netherlands in March 1981 and produced and conceived by Jaap Eggermont. In the US, the album was retitled Stars on Long Play, released on Atlantic Records' sublabel Radio Records and credited to 'Stars On'. In the UK and Ireland, the group was renamed 'Starsound' (on certain releases spelt StarSound or Star Sound) and the album itself was listed as Stars on 45 or Stars on 45 – The Album and released by CBS Records. In the Spanish-speaking countries, both the group and the album were launched under a fourth name: Estrellas en 45. Stars on 45 was released in the Soviet Union and large parts of the Eastern Bloc on the state-owned Melodiya label, credited to Stars on 45, the Russian title of the album translates as Discothèque Stars and in Czechoslovakia, on the state-owned Opus label as Stars on 45. In the Philippines, it was released under the title Stars on 45 Long Play Album (manufactured and printed in the Philippines by Dyna Products, Inc. under license from PhonoGram International B.V., using the Mercury label.)

The two tracks by Long Tall Ernie & the Shakers were originally released in 1977 as singles. Both were produced by Jaap Eggermont.

== Track listing ==
Side one

1. "Beatles Medley", performed by Stars on 45/Stars On/Starsound – 15:58 (US: 15:41)

All tracks written by John Lennon and Paul McCartney unless otherwise noted

- "Stars on 45" (Eggermont, Duiser)
- "No Reply"
- "I'll Be Back"
- "Drive My Car"
- "Do You Want to Know a Secret"
- "We Can Work It Out"
- "I Should Have Known Better"
- "Nowhere Man"
- "You're Going to Lose That Girl"
- "Ticket to Ride"
- "The Word"
- "Eleanor Rigby"
- "Every Little Thing"
- "And Your Bird Can Sing"
- "Get Back"
- "Eight Days a Week"
- "It Won't Be Long"
- "Day Tripper"
- "Wait"
- "Stars on 45" (Eggermont, Duiser)
- "Good Day Sunshine"
- "My Sweet Lord" (Harrison)
- "Here Comes the Sun" (Harrison)
- "While My Guitar Gently Weeps" (Harrison)
- "Taxman" (Harrison)
- "A Hard Days Night"
- "Things We Said Today"
- "If I Fell"
- "You Can't Do That"
- "Please Please Me"
- "From Me to You" (omitted on the US version)
- "I Wanna Hold Your Hand"
- "Stars on 45" (Eggermont, Duiser)

Side two

1. "Medley" (a.k.a. "Boogie Nights and Other Hits"), performed by Stars on 45/Stars On/Starsound – 8:08 (US: 7:25)

- "Stars on 45" (Eggermont, Duiser)
- "Boogie Nights" (Temperton)
- "Funkytown" (Greenberg)
- "Video Killed the Radio Star" (Downes, Horne, Wooley)
- "Venus" (van Leeuwen)
- "Sugar Sugar" (Kim, Barry)
- "Cathy's Clown" (Everly, Everly)
- "Breaking Up Is Hard to Do" (Sedaka, Greenfield - omitted on the US version)
- "Only the Lonely" (Orbison, Melson)
- "Lady Bump" (Levay, Prager)
- "Jimmy Mack" (Holland–Dozier–Holland)
- "Rainy Day" (Cook and Greenaway, Macaulay)
- "Itsy Bitsy Teenie Weenie Yellow Polkadot Bikini" (Pockridge, Vance - omitted on the US version)
- "Stars on 45" (Eggermont, Duiser)

2. "Do You Remember" (a.k.a. "Rock 'n Roll Medley"), performed by Long Tall Ernie and the Shakers – 4:31

- "Do You Remember" (Britnell, Treffers)
- "Lucille" (Penniman, Collins)
- "Bird Dog" (Bryant)
- "Runaway" (Shannon, Crook)
- "Do You Remember" (Britnell, Treffers)
- "Bread and Butter" (Turnbow, Parks)
- "That's Alright" (Crudup)
- "Rip It Up" (Marascalco, Blackwell)
- "Jenny Jenny" (Johnson, Penniman)

3. "Golden Years of Rock & Roll", performed by Long Tall Ernie and the Shakers – 4:26 (US: 4:10)

- "Golden Years of Rock & Roll" (Britnell, Treffers)
- "Sherry" (Gaudio - omitted on the US version)
- "Wooly Bully" (Samudio)
- "Golden Years of Rock & Roll" (Britnell, Treffers)
- "Buona Sera" (Sigman, DeRose)
- "Slippin' and Slidin'" (Penniman, Bocage, Collins, Smith)
- "Nut Rocker" (Tchaikowsky, Fowley)
- "Golden Years of Rock & Roll" (Britnell, Treffers)
- "At the Hop" (Singer, White, Medora)

== Credits ==
=== Personnel ===
- Jody Pijper – vocals
- Bas Muys – vocals (John Lennon)
- Okkie Huysdens – vocals (Paul McCartney)
- Hans Vermeulen – vocals (George Harrison)
- Long Tall Ernie and the Shakers – performers

=== Production ===
- Jaap Eggermont – record producer
- Martin Duiser – musical arranger

== Charts ==
=== Weekly charts ===
Chart (1981)	Peak position
Australian Albums (Kent Music Report)	1
Austrian Albums (Ö3 Austria)	2
Dutch Albums (Album Top 100)	3
German Albums (Offizielle Top 100)	1
New Zealand Albums (RMNZ)	1
Swedish Albums (Sverigetopplistan)	15
UK Albums (OCC)	1
US Billboard 200	9

=== Year-end charts ===
Chart (1981)	Position
New Zealand Albums (RMNZ)	45

== Sales and certifications ==
Certifications for Long Play Album
Region	Certification	Certified units/sales
Netherlands (NVPI)	Gold	50,000^{^}
^{^} Shipments figures based on certification alone.

== Sources and external links ==
- Mawer, Sharon. Biography of Stars on 45/Starsound at AllMusic. Retrieved 2012-04025.
- Stars on 45 discography at Discogs
- Rateyourmusic.com biography and discography
- Dutch biography and discography
- Billboard.com biography and chart history
- Official Charts, UK chart history
- Dutch chart history
- Long Play Album at Discogs (list of releases)
