= More Stars =

- Original Dutch 7" single sleeve

Single by Stars on 45

from the album Longplay Album – Volume II
- B-side: "45 Stars Get Ready" (NL, US and UK) "Instrumental" (Star Wars and Other Hits; Canada-only)
- Released: July 1981
- Recorded: 1981
- Genre: Disco; pop
- Length: 4:48 (7" version); 11:58 (12" version)
- Label: CNR Records (NL); Radio/Atlantic Records (US); CBS Records (UK); Carrere (France); Mercury Records (Argentina, Mexico, Philippines, NZ and AU)
- Songwriters: Benny Andersson; Björn Ulvaeus; Stig Anderson
- Producer: Jaap Eggermont

Stars on 45 singles chronology
"Stars on 45" (1981)	"More Stars" (1981)	"Volume III" (1981)

Audios
- "More Stars Side 1" (7" version) on YouTube
- "More Stars (ABBA Medley)" (original single version) on YouTube
- "Volume Two" (12" version) on YouTube

"More Stars" (also known as "More Stars on 45" in the US, "Stars on 45 Vol. 2" in the UK and "More Stars on 45 II" in Canada) is a song medley released in July 1981 by the Dutch soundalike studio group Stars on 45 (credited to 'Stars On' in the US and Canada and 'Starsound' in the UK). It was the follow-up to the US and Dutch #1 and UK #2 single "Stars on 45" (released under its full 41-word title, but generally simply known as "Stars on 45 Medley"). "More Stars" was later included on the group's second album Longplay Album – Volume II (US title: Stars on Long Play II; UK title: Stars on 45 — The Album — Volume 2).

The "More Stars" medley featured eight hits by Swedish group ABBA, seven of which already had been UK Top 10 hits: "Voulez-Vous" (#3, 1979) "S.O.S." (#6, 1975), "Money, Money, Money" (#3, 1976), "Fernando" (#1, 1976), "Knowing Me, Knowing You" (#1, 1977), "The Winner Takes It All" (#1, 1980) and "Super Trouper" (#1, 1980). The eighth title chosen for the medley was somewhat surprisingly "Bang-A-Boomerang", one of ABBA's lesser known tracks and indeed only released as a single in one country: France. The eight minute plus album version of the ABBA medley which was released on CD on the 2011 30th Anniversary best of edition 30 Years Anniversary of Stars on 45 added another seven titles; "Dum Dum Diddle", "Lay All Your Love on Me", "On and On and On", "Super Trouper" (reprise), "Summer Night City", "Gimme! Gimme! Gimme! (A Man After Midnight)" and "Stars on 45 (2)" (reprise).

The near eleven-minute 12" mix of "Volume Two" started with another, notably different medley, mainly featuring American 60s and 70s hits from the soul, R&B and folk rock genres by among others The Temptations, Smokey Robinson & the Miracles, Four Tops, The Supremes, The Mamas & the Papas, Neil Diamond and Simon & Garfunkel. This medley was later also included on the Longplay Album – Volume II in slightly re-edited form preceding "Supremes Medley" on that album.

"More Stars" became Stars on 45/Starsound's second single to peak at #2 on the UK charts and indeed a Top 10 single in most parts of Europe. In the US, where ABBA's popularity wasn't on the same scale as in Europe, Radio Records instead chose an edit of the first part of the 12" mix, starting with "Papa Was a Rolling Stone" as a 7" single, and released it as the follow-up to the second Beatles medley "Stars on 45 Medley 2", but under the same title: "More Stars" (#55, Billboard's Hot 100).

== Formats and track listings ==
- Dutch & UK 7" single

Side one

"More Stars" (UK title: "Stars on 45 Vol. 2") (7" version) - 4:48

All tracks written by Benny Andersson and Björn Ulvaeus unless otherwise noted

- "Stars on 45 (2)" (Eggermont, Duiser)
- "Voulez-Vous"
- "S.O.S." (Andersson, Anderson, Ulvaeus)
- "Bang-A-Boomerang" (Andersson, Anderson, Ulvaeus)
- "Money, Money, Money"
- "Knowing Me, Knowing You" (Andersson, Anderson, Ulvaeus)
- "Fernando" (Andersson, Anderson, Ulvaeus)
- "The Winner Takes It All"
- "Super Trouper"
- "Stars on 45 (2)" (Eggermont, Duiser)

Side two

"'45 Stars Get Ready" (7" version) (Eggermont, Duiser) - 3:12

- US 7" single

Side one

"More Stars on 45" (7" version) - 4:40

- "Papa Was a Rollin' Stone" (Whitfield)
- "Dance to the Music" (Stewart)
- "Sugar Baby Love" (Bickerton, Waddington)
- "Papa Was a Rollin' Stone" (Whitfield)
- "Let's Go to San Francisco" (Carter and Lewis)
- "A Horse with No Name" (Bunnell)
- "Monday Monday" (Phillips)
- "Tears of a Clown" (Cosby, Robinson, Wonder)
- "Stop In the Name of Love" (Holland–Dozier–Holland)
- "Cracklin' Rosie" (Diamond)
- "Do Wah Diddy Diddy" (Barry, Greenwich)
- "A Lover's Concerto" (Linzer, Randell)
- "Reach Out I'll Be There" (Holland–Dozier–Holland)
- "Sound of Silence" (Simon)
- "Stars on 45" (Eggermont, Duiser)

Side two

"'45 Stars Get Ready" (12" version) (Eggermont, Duiser) - 4:02

- Canadian 7" single

Side one

"More Stars on 45 II" (a.k.a. "ABBA Medley") (7" version) - 4:48

All tracks written by Benny Andersson and Björn Ulvaeus unless otherwise noted

- "Stars on 45 (2)" (Eggermont, Duiser)
- "Voulez-Vous"
- "S.O.S." (Andersson, Anderson, Ulvaeus)
- "Bang-A-Boomerang" (Andersson, Anderson, Ulvaeus)
- "Money, Money, Money"
- "Knowing Me, Knowing You" (Andersson, Anderson, Ulvaeus)
- "Fernando" (Andersson, Anderson, Ulvaeus)
- "The Winner Takes It All"
- "Super Trouper"
- "Stars on 45 (2)" (Eggermont, Duiser)

Side two

"Instrumental" (a.k.a. "Introductions") (7" version) - 4:00

- "Star Wars Main Theme" (Williams)
- "Can't Give You Anything (But My Love)" (Creatore, Weiss, Peretti)
- "Kung-Fu-Fighting" (Douglas)
- "All Right Now" (Rodgers, Fraser)
- "Fire" (Springsteen)
- "Do You Think I'm Sexy" (Stewart, Appice)
- "Y.M.C.A." (Morali, Belolo, Willis)
- "The Good, the Bad, and the Ugly" (Morricone)
- "Theme from M*A*S*H*" (Mandel, Altman)
- "Sun Ain't Gonna Shine Anymore" (Crewe, Gaudio)
- "Overture from Tommy" (Townshend)
- "Get Off" (Driggs, Ledersma)
- "Stars on 45" (Eggermont, Duiser)
- "Baker Street" (Rafferty)
- "Eve of the War" (Wayne)
- Dutch, US & UK 12" single

Side one

"Volume Two" (US title: "Stars on 45 Volume II"; UK title: "Stars on 45 Vol. 2") (12" version) - 11:58

- "Stars on 45 (2)" (Eggermont, Duiser)
- "Papa Was a Rollin' Stone" (Whitfield)
- "Dance to the Music" (Stewart)
- "Sugar Baby Love" (Bickerton, Waddington)
- "Papa Was a Rollin' Stone" (Whitfield)
- "Let's Go to San Francisco" (Carter and Lewis)
- "A Horse with No Name" (Bunnell)
- "Monday Monday" (Phillips)
- "San Francisco" (Phillips)
- "California Dreamin'" (Phillips)
- "Eve of Destruction" (Sloan)
- "Tears of a Clown" (Cosby, Robinson, Wonder)
- "Stop In the Name of Love" (Holland–Dozier–Holland)
- "Cracklin' Rosie" (Diamond)
- "Do-Wah-Diddy-Diddy" (Barry, Greenwich)
- "A Lover's Concerto" (Linzer, Randell)
- "Reach Out I'll Be There" (Holland–Dozier–Holland)
- "Sound of Silence" (Simon)
- "Stars on 45 (2)" (Eggermont, Duiser)
- "Voulez-Vous" (Andersson, Ulvaeus)
- "S.O.S." (Andersson, Ulvaeus, Anderson)
- "Bang-A-Boomerang" (Andersson, Ulvaeus, Anderson)
- "Money, Money, Money" (Andersson, Ulvaeus)
- "Knowing Me, Knowing You" (Ulvaeus, Andersson, Anderson)
- "Fernando" (Andersson, Ulvaeus, Anderson)
- "The Winner Takes It All" (Andersson, Ulvaeus)
- "Super Trouper" (Andersson, Ulvaeus)
- "Stars on 45 (2)" (Eggermont, Duiser)

Side two

"'45 Stars Get Ready" (12" version) (Eggermont, Duiser) - 4:04

- Digital download

1. "More Stars (ABBA Medley)" (original single version) - 3:53

All tracks written by Benny Andersson and Björn Ulvaeus unless otherwise noted

- "Stars on 45 (2)" (Eggermont, Duiser)
- "Voulez-Vous"
- "S.O.S." (Andersson, Anderson, Ulvaeus)
- "Bang-A-Boomerang" (Andersson, Anderson, Ulvaeus)
- "Money, Money, Money"
- "Knowing Me, Knowing You" (Andersson, Anderson, Ulvaeus)
- "Fernando" (Andersson, Anderson, Ulvaeus)
- "The Winner Takes It All"
- "Super Trouper"
- "Stars on 45 (2)" (Eggermont, Duiser)

2. "'45 Stars Get Ready" (12" version) (Eggermont, Duiser) - 4:02

== Charts ==
=== Weekly charts ===
Chart (1981)	Peak position
Australia (Kent Music Report)	26
Austria (Ö3 Austria Top 40)	4
Belgium (Ultratop 50 Flanders)	3
Canada Top Singles (RPM)	36
Canada Adult Contemporary (RPM)	12
Denmark (IFPI)	2
Finland (Suomen virallinen lista)	1
Ireland (IRMA)	3
Italy (Musica e dischi)	8
Netherlands (Dutch Top 40)	4
Netherlands (Single Top 100)	3
Spain (AFYVE)	4
Sweden (Sverigetopplistan)	12
Switzerland (Schweizer Hitparade)	1
UK Singles (Official Charts)	2
US Billboard Hot 100	55
US Adult Contemporary (Billboard)	11
West Germany (GfK)	2

=== Year-end charts ===
Chart (1981)	Position
Belgium (Ultratop 50 Flanders)	27
Netherlands (Dutch Top 40)	50
Netherlands (Single Top 100)	79
Switzerland (Schweitzer Hitparade)	20
UK Singles (OCC)	36
US (Joel Whitburn's Pop Annual)	260
West Germany (Offizielle Deutsche Charts)	54

== Sales and certifications ==
Certifications for More Stars
Region	Certification	Certified units/sales
Netherlands (NVPI)	Gold	100,000^{^}
^{^} Shipments figures based on certification alone.

== Sources and external links ==
- Mawer, Sharon. Biography of Stars on 45/Starsound at AllMusic. Retrieved 2012-04025.
- Stars on 45 discography at Discogs
- Rateyourmusic.com biography and discography
- The Dutch Stars on 45 fansite
- Top4000.nl
- UK Top 40
- Irish Charts.ie
- AustrianCharts.at
- Hitparade.ch, Switzerland
- NorwegianCharts.com
- SwedishCharts.com
- West German charts
- Stars on 45 Volume Two at Discogs (list of releases)
- More Stars on 45 II at Discogs (list of releases)
