= Lobo (Dutch singer) =

Dutch singer (1955–2025)

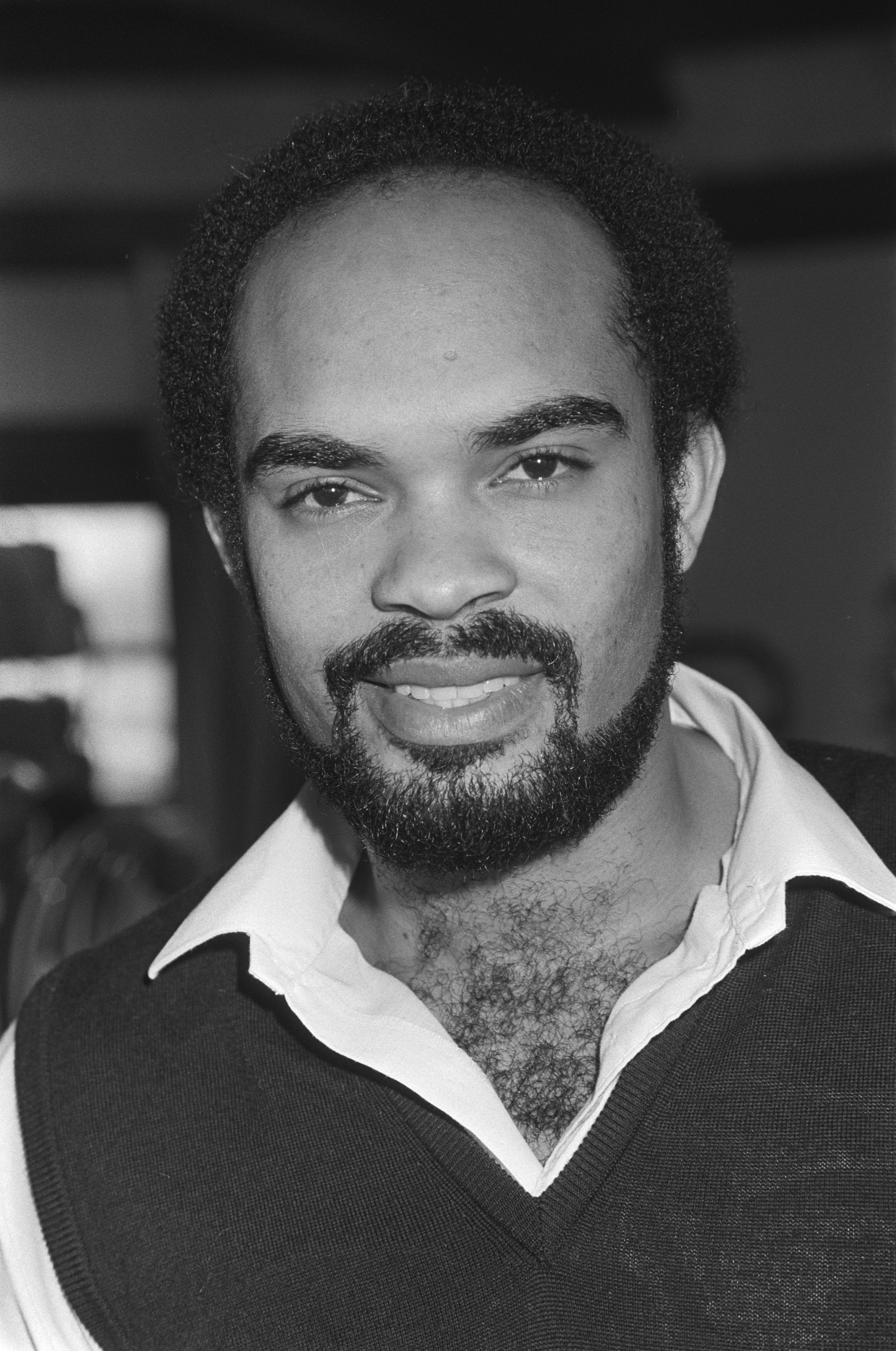
- Lobo in 1981

Background information
- Born: Imrich Laurence Lobo; 2 June 1955; Paramaribo, Suriname
- Died: 19 January 2025 (aged 69)
- Genres: Pop; calypso
- Occupation: Singer
- Years active: 1980–2025
- Label: Mercury

Imrich Laurence Lobo (2 June 1955 – 19 January 2025), better known by his stage name Lobo, was a Dutch singer.

== Life and career ==
After the success of Stars on 45, many artists jumped on the medley bandwagon, and Lobo's medley of calypso hits — entitled "Caribbean Disco Show" — was a number 1 hit in the Netherlands for three weeks in July and August 1981, as well as topping the Belgian (Flemish) chart. The single also made the top ten in the UK singles chart, being one of seven medleys in the top 30 in mid-August.

Lobo had two other smaller hits in the Netherlands, but remained a one-hit wonder elsewhere in Europe.

Apart from his music career, Lobo was a physics teacher at a Dutch school until retiring in 2021.

Lobo died on 19 January 2025, at the age of 69.

== Discography ==
=== Studio albums ===
- If I Say (1980)
- The Caribbean Disco Show (1981)
- Soca Calypso! (1982)

=== Singles ===
Year	Title	UK	RoI	NL	CH	DE	AT	BE (V)
1981	"Caribbean Disco Show"	8	15	1	11	18	12	1
1981	"Lobo's Gospel Show"	–	–	19	–	–	–	–
1982	"Soca Calypso Party"	–	–	33	–	–	–	–
1982	"Acumbajeh"	–	–	–	–	–	–	–
1984	"Nights in Nairobi"	–	–	–	–	–	–	–
1985	"Does Anybody Care" (Lobo & The Pearls)	–	–	–	–	–	–	–
1986	"Nana Hey" (Lobo & The Pearls)	–	–	–	–	–	–	–
1996	"15 Jaar"	–	–	–	–	–	–	–
2003	"LCP"	–	–	–	–	–	–	–
2006	"Lobo's Caribbean Christmas Party"	–	–	–	–	–	–	–
"—" denotes releases that did not chart.
