= Volume III (song) =

- Original Dutch single sleeve

Single by Stars on 45

from the album Longplay Album - Volume II
- B-side: "Stars on' Theme"
- Released: September 1981
- Recorded: 1981
- Genre: Pop; Disco
- Length: 5:15
- Label: CNR Records (NL); CBS Records (UK)
- Producer: Jaap Eggermont

Stars on 45 singles chronology
"More Stars" (1981)	"Volume III" (1981)	"Stars on Stevie" (1982)

Music video
- "Volume III" (TopPop, 1981) on YouTube

"Volume III" a.k.a. "Stars on 45 Volume 3" is a song issued in 1981 by the Dutch studio group Stars on 45, in the UK credited to 'Starsound'. It was the second single from the band's second full-length release Longplay Album - Volume II (UK title: Stars On 45 - The Album - Volume 2, US title: Stars on Longplay II).

The "Volume III" medley is the opening track on Longplay Album - Volume II and then had the title "Star Wars And Other Hits", in the UK it was named "Instrumental Medley" and in the US "Introductions"; the very same recording was consequently released under no less than five different titles throughout the world. The medley featured instrumental intros to hits from a wide variety of genres, from well known movie themes like "Star Wars" and "The Good, The Bad and the Ugly", 60's and 70's hits by The Stylistics, Boney M., Eric Clapton, The Village People and The Pointer Sisters to the overture from The Who's musical Tommy and the main theme from Jeff Wayne's musical version of "The War of the Worlds".

The slightly edited 7" version omitted two of the medley's nineteen titles - The Walker Brothers' "The Sun Ain't Gonna Shine Anymore" and the overture from "Tommy" - while the slightly extended 12" single featured a longer ”Get Off” section (taken from the B-side) before the Stars on 45 theme. The B-side of both editions was entitled "'Stars on' Theme" and was an alternate mix of an instrumental part of the album track "'45 Stars Get Ready". Both 7" and 12" versions were re-released digitally in September 2021.

"Volume III"/"Stars on 45 Volume 3" became Stars on 45/Starsound's third Top 20 single in the UK and Ireland, peaking at #17 and #11 respectively, and their third Top 10 single in the Netherlands.

== Track listing 7" single ==
=== Side A ===
"Volume III" (7" Mix) - 4:33

- "Star Wars Main Title" (Williams)
- "Can't Give You Anything (But My Love)" (Creatore, Perreti, Weiss)
- "Kung Fu Fighting" (Douglas, Hawke)
- "Layla" (Clapton, Gordon)
- "All Right Now" (Fraser, Rodgers)
- "Fire" (Springsteen)
- "Da Ya Think I'm Sexy?" (Stewart, Appice)
- "Ma Baker" (Farian, Reyam, Jay)
- "Y.M.C.A" (Belolo, Morali, Willis)
- "The Good, The Bad And The Ugly" (Morricone)
- "Don't Stop 'Til You Get Enough" (Jackson)
- "Theme From M.A.S.H. (Suicide Is Painless)" (Mandel, Altman)
- "Get Off" (Driggs, Ledesma)
- "Stars On 45" (Eggermont, Duiser)
- "Baker Street" (Rafferty)
- "Bette Davis Eyes" (DeShannon, Weiss)
- "Eve of the War" (Wayne)

=== Side B ===
"'Stars on' Theme" (7" Mix) (Eggermont, Duiser) - 4:00

== Track listing 12" single ==
=== Side A ===
"Volume III" (12” Mix) - 5:47

- "Star Wars Main Title" (Williams)
- "Can't Give You Anything (But My Love)" (Creatore, Perreti, Weiss)
- "Kung Fu Fighting" (Douglas, Hawke)
- "Layla" (Clapton, Gordon)
- "All Right Now" (Fraser, Rodgers)
- "Fire" (Springsteen)
- "Da Ya Think I'm Sexy?" (Stewart, Appice)
- "Ma Baker" (Farian, Reyam, Jay)
- "Y.M.C.A" (Belolo, Morali, Willis)
- "The Good, The Bad And The Ugly" (Morricone)
- "Don't Stop 'Til You Get Enough" (Jackson)
- "Theme From M.A.S.H. (Suicide Is Painless)" (Mandel, Altman)
- "The Sun Ain't Gonna Shine (Anymore)" (Crewe, Gaudio)
- "Overture From Tommy" (Townshend)
- "Get Off" (Driggs, Ledesma)
- "Stars On 45" (Eggermont, Duiser)
- "Baker Street" (Rafferty)
- "Bette Davis Eyes" (DeShannon, Weiss)
- "Eve of the War" (Wayne)

=== Side B ===
"'Stars on' Theme" (12" Mix) (Eggermont, Duiser) - 5:05

== Charts ==
=== Weekly charts ===
Chart (1981)	Peak position
Belgium (Ultratop 50 Flanders)	8
Denmark (IFPI)	2
Finland (Suomen virallinen lista)	6
Ireland (IRMA)	11
Netherlands (Dutch Top 40)	10
Netherlands (Single Top 100)	4
UK Singles (Official Charts)	17
West Germany (GfK)	17

=== Year-end charts ===
Chart (1981)	Position
Belgium (Ultratop 50 Flanders)	57
Netherlands (Single Top 100)	95

== Sources and external links ==
- Mawer, Sharon. Biography of Stars on 45/Starsound at AllMusic. Retrieved 2012-04025.
- Stars on 45 discography at Discogs
- Rateyourmusic.com biography and discography
- The Dutch Stars on 45 fansite
- Top40.nl
- UK Top 40
- Irish Charts.ie
