= List of Billboard 200 number-one albums of 1981 =

The Billboard 200, published in Billboard magazine, is a weekly chart that ranks the 200 highest-selling music albums and EPs in the United States. Before Nielsen SoundScan began tracking sales in 1991, Billboard estimated the sales for the album charts from a representative sampling of record stores nationwide, which was gathered by telephone, fax or messenger service. The data was based on reports from record stores, who ranked the popularity of the best-selling records but did not provide an actual sales figures.

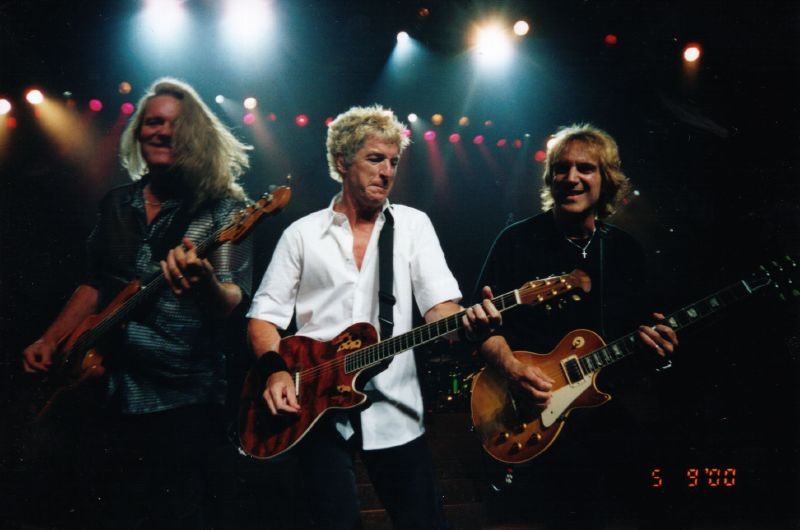
Hi Infidelity by REO Speedwagon was the best-selling album of 1981, and spent 15 non-consecutive weeks at number one.

== Chart history ==
Key
†	Indicates best performing album of 1981

Issue date	Album	Artist(s)	Label	Ref.
January 3	Double Fantasy	John Lennon and Yoko Ono	Geffen	
January 10	Double Fantasy	John Lennon and Yoko Ono	Geffen	
January 17	Double Fantasy	John Lennon and Yoko Ono	Geffen	
January 24	Double Fantasy	John Lennon and Yoko Ono	Geffen	
January 31	Double Fantasy	John Lennon and Yoko Ono	Geffen	
February 7	Double Fantasy	John Lennon and Yoko Ono	Geffen	
February 14	Double Fantasy	John Lennon and Yoko Ono	Geffen	
February 21	Hi Infidelity †	REO Speedwagon	Epic	
February 28	Hi Infidelity †	REO Speedwagon	Epic	
March 7	Hi Infidelity †	REO Speedwagon	Epic	
March 14	Hi Infidelity †	REO Speedwagon	Epic	
March 21	Hi Infidelity †	REO Speedwagon	Epic	
March 28	Hi Infidelity †	REO Speedwagon	Epic	
April 4	Paradise Theatre	Styx	A&M	
April 11	Paradise Theatre	Styx	A&M	
April 18	Hi Infidelity †	REO Speedwagon	Epic	
April 25	Hi Infidelity †	REO Speedwagon	Epic	
May 2	Hi Infidelity †	REO Speedwagon	Epic	
May 9	Paradise Theatre	Styx	A&M	
May 16	Hi Infidelity †	REO Speedwagon	Epic	
May 23	Hi Infidelity †	REO Speedwagon	Epic	
May 30	Hi Infidelity †	REO Speedwagon	Epic	
June 6	Hi Infidelity †	REO Speedwagon	Epic	
June 13	Hi Infidelity †	REO Speedwagon	Epic	
June 20	Hi Infidelity †	REO Speedwagon	Epic	
June 27	Mistaken Identity	Kim Carnes	EMI America	
July 4	Mistaken Identity	Kim Carnes	EMI America	
July 11	Mistaken Identity	Kim Carnes	EMI America	
July 18	Mistaken Identity	Kim Carnes	EMI America	
July 25	Long Distance Voyager	The Moody Blues	Threshold	
August 1	Long Distance Voyager	The Moody Blues	Threshold	
August 8	Long Distance Voyager	The Moody Blues	Threshold	
August 15	Precious Time	Pat Benatar	Chrysalis	
August 22	4	Foreigner	Atlantic	
August 29	4	Foreigner	Atlantic	
September 5	Bella Donna	Stevie Nicks	Modern	
September 12	Escape	Journey	Columbia	
September 19	Tattoo You	The Rolling Stones	Rolling Stones	
September 26	Tattoo You	The Rolling Stones	Rolling Stones	
October 3	Tattoo You	The Rolling Stones	Rolling Stones	
October 10	Tattoo You	The Rolling Stones	Rolling Stones	
October 17	Tattoo You	The Rolling Stones	Rolling Stones	
October 24	Tattoo You	The Rolling Stones	Rolling Stones	
October 31	Tattoo You	The Rolling Stones	Rolling Stones	
November 7	Tattoo You	The Rolling Stones	Rolling Stones	
November 14	Tattoo You	The Rolling Stones	Rolling Stones	
November 21	4	Foreigner	Atlantic	
November 28	4	Foreigner	Atlantic	
December 5	4	Foreigner	Atlantic	
December 12	4	Foreigner	Atlantic	
December 19	4	Foreigner	Atlantic	
December 26	For Those About to Rock We Salute You	AC/DC	Atlantic	

== See also ==
- List of Billboard Hot 100 number-one singles of 1981
- 1981 in music
- List of number-one albums (United States)
