= Stars on 45 (song) =

1981 single by Stars on 45

- U.S. single distributed by Atlantic Records

Single by Stars on 45

from the album Long Play Album
- Released: January 1981
- Recorded: 1980
- Genre: Disco; pop; novelty
- Length: 4:48 (7" version); 11:30 (12" version)
- Label: CNR (NL); Radio/Atlantic (US); CBS (UK); Carrere (France); Mercury (Argentina, Mexico, Philippines, NZ and AU)
- Songwriters: Robbie van Leeuwen; Jeff Barry; Andy Kim; Lennon-McCartney
- Producer: Jaap Eggermont

Stars on 45 singles chronology
"Stars on 45" (1981)	"More Stars" (1981)

Audios
- "Stars on 45" (original 7-inch A-side) on YouTube
- "Stars on 45" (original 12-inch version, maxi disco single) on YouTube

Music video
- "Stars on 45" (TopPop, 1981) on YouTube

"Stars on 45" is a song medley issued in January 1981 by Dutch studio group Stars on 45. In some countries, including the UK, Ireland, and New Zealand, the band was credited as 'Starsound' and only the medley itself was named "Stars on 45".

The song's origin comes from an underground 12" that was big in clubs in the late 1970s. It used the actual songs, rather than the re-recorded cover versions, with a drum backing. At the end of the underground 12" was the track "Doing It to Death" by the J.B.'s featuring James Brown.

Its official title in the US and Canada (as on the record and in Billboard and RPM) is Medley: Intro 'Venus'/Sugar, Sugar/No Reply/I'll Be Back/Drive My Car/Do You Want to Know a Secret/We Can Work It Out/I Should Have Known Better/Nowhere Man/You're Going to Lose That Girl/Stars on 45 and was credited to Stars on 45. It is to date the longest titled song to ever chart on Billboard and was conveniently shortened to "Stars on 45 Medley", or "'Medley' by Stars on 45". The length of the name surpassed the previous record set by the Ray Stevens song "Jeremiah Peabody's Polyunsaturated Quick-Dissolving Fast-Acting Pleasant-Tasting Green and Purple Pills", and (among songs that reached number one) "(Hey Won't You Play) Another Somebody Done Somebody Wrong Song" by B. J. Thomas. The reason for the long title was copyright requirements for the use of the Beatles' songs, which takes a vast majority of the medley.

It reached number 1 in the Netherlands on February 21, 1981; number 2 in the UK on May 9, 1981; number 1 on the Billboard Hot 100 on June 20, 1981, and was number 1 in Canada for 12 weeks from June 6 to August 22. In the US, the single also peaked at number 18 on the dance chart. In the US, the song's one-week stay at the top of the Hot 100 interrupted "Bette Davis Eyes" run as the number 1 single at five weeks. The next week, the Kim Carnes song regained its number 1 status for a further four weeks.

The origin of the single was the Netherlands where numerous bootleg disco singles were floating around, most importantly Alto Passion's "Let's Do It in the 80's Great Hits". Willem van Kooten, the owner of one of the copyrights, decided to make a similar, legitimate record of a 12" single titled "Let's Do It in the 80s Great Hits" credited to a Canadian group called Passion (though the snippets of songs were taken from the original recordings). He found singers who sounded similar to John Lennon and Paul McCartney, including Smyle's Bas Muys and Sandy Coast's Okkie Huysdens, and decided to make the single focus on the Beatles. The Beatles medley was later extended to a full 16-minute album side. It appeared on Stars on 45's first full-length release, Long Play Album (US title: Stars on Long Play; UK title: Stars on 45 — The Album).

The album version of the song moved "Venus" and "Sugar, Sugar" to Side Two into a different medley, and added several more Beatles songs as well as a 32-second instrumental extract from George Harrison's "My Sweet Lord" and even a fleeting reference to new wave band Sparks' "Beat the Clock", for a total length of about 15 minutes. The album version was released as Long Play Album in the Netherlands, and retitled to Stars on Long Play in the US and Stars on 45 — The Album in the UK. A detailed listing of the source material can be found in the Long Play Album article.

The song also became a huge success in the UK where it kicked off a craze for medleys, with a large number of records in the Stars on 45 mould reaching the UK Top 40 in 1981. For example, The Hollies recorded "Holliedaze", a medley of some of their previous hits, which reached 28 on the UK charts with Graham Nash and Eric Haydock briefly rejoining the group in September 1981 to promote the record. Likewise, in the US, the song started a medley craze that lasted for about a year and introduced not only other medleys by Stars on 45, but medleys by the Beatles themselves, the Beach Boys, the Royal Philharmonic Orchestra, Meco, and Larry Elgart and His Manhattan Swing Orchestra.

== Formats and track listings ==
- Dutch, US & UK 7" single

Side one

"Stars on 45" (Medley - 7" version) - 4:48 (US: 4:05)

- "Stars on 45" (Eggermont, Duiser - omitted on the US version)
- "Venus" (van Leeuwen)
- "Sugar Sugar" (Kim, Barry)
- "No Reply" (Lennon–McCartney)
- "I'll Be Back" (Lennon–McCartney)
- "Drive My Car" (Lennon–McCartney)
- "Do You Want to Know a Secret" (Lennon–McCartney)
- "We Can Work It Out" (Lennon–McCartney)
- "I Should Have Known Better" (Lennon–McCartney)
- "Nowhere Man" (Lennon–McCartney)
- "You're Going to Lose That Girl" (Lennon–McCartney)
- "Stars on 45" (Eggermont, Duiser)
- Includes uncredited musical references to Sparks's song "Beat the Clock"

Side two

"Stars on 45" (Theme - 7" version) (Eggermont, Duiser) - 3:30

- Includes uncredited musical references to Lipps Inc.'s "Funkytown" and The Buggles' "Video Killed the Radio Star"

"Venus" is the 1970 Shocking Blue song, written by the band's Robbie van Leeuwen and later covered by Tom Jones and Bananarama. Only the opening guitar riff is used in the medley. "Sugar, Sugar" was originally recorded by The Archies (written by Jeff Barry and Andy Kim). The next eight songs are Beatles songs (written by John Lennon and Paul McCartney).

An extended version of the "Stars on 45" intro and finale was put on the flip side of the single.

- Dutch, US & UK 12" single

Side one

"Stars on 45" (Medley - 12" version) 11:30 (US: 10:15)

- "Stars on 45" (Eggermont, Duiser)
- "Boogie Nights" (Temperton)
- "Funkytown" (Greenberg)
- "Video Killed the Radio Star" (Downes, Horne, Wooley)
- "Venus" (van Leeuwen)
- "Sugar Sugar" (Kim, Barry)
- "No Reply" (Lennon–McCartney)
- "I'll Be Back" (Lennon–McCartney)
- "Drive My Car" (Lennon–McCartney)
- "Do You Want to Know a Secret" (Lennon–McCartney)
- "We Can Work It Out" (Lennon–McCartney)
- "I Should Have Known Better" (Lennon–McCartney)
- "Nowhere Man" (Lennon–McCartney)
- "You're Going to Lose That Girl" (Lennon–McCartney)
- "Sherry" (Gaudio - 12" version only; omitted on the US version)
- "Cathy's Clown" (Everly, Everly)
- "Breaking Up Is Hard to Do" (Sedaka, Greenfield - omitted on the US version)
- "Only the Lonely" (Orbison, Melson)
- "Lady Bump" (Levay, Prager)
- "Jimmy Mack" (Holland–Dozier–Holland)
- "Rainy Day" (Cook and Greenaway, Macaulay)
- "Itsy Bitsy Teenie Weenie Yellow Polkadot Bikini" (Pockridge, Vance - omitted on the US version)
- "Stars on 45" (Eggermont, Duiser)
- Includes uncredited musical references to Sparks's "Beat the Clock", Ritz's "I Wanna Get with You", The S.O.S. Band's "Take Your Time (Do It Right)" and Sparkle Tuhran & Friends' "Handsome Man"

Side two

"Stars on 45" (Theme - 12" version) (Eggermont, Duiser) - 6:18

- Includes uncredited musical references to Lipps Inc.'s "Funkytown" and The Buggles' "Video Killed the Radio Star"

== Charts ==
=== Weekly charts ===
Chart (1981)	Peak position
Australia (Kent Music Report)	1
Austria (Ö3 Austria Top 40)	1
Belgium (Ultratop 50 Flanders)	1
Canada Top Singles (RPM)	1
Canada Adult Contemporary (RPM)	1
Denmark (IFPI)	1
Finland (Suomen virallinen lista)	2
Ireland (IRMA)	1
Italy (Musica e dischi)	7
Netherlands (Dutch Top 40)	1
Netherlands (Single Top 100)	1
New Zealand (Recorded Music NZ)	1
Norway (VG-lista)	5
South Africa (Springbok Radio)	10
Spain (AFYVE)	1
Sweden (Sverigetopplistan)	7
Switzerland (Schweizer Hitparade)	1
UK Singles (Official Charts)	2
US Billboard Hot 100	1
US Adult Contemporary (Billboard)	11
US Cash Box Top 100	1
West Germany (GfK)	1

=== Year-end charts ===
Chart (1981)	Position
Australia (Kent Music Report)	2
Austria (Ö3 Austria Top 40)	2
Belgium (Ultratop 50 Flanders)	3
Canada Top Singles (RPM)	1
Netherlands (Dutch Top 40)	4
Netherlands (Single Top 100)	3
New Zealand (Recorded Music NZ)	1
Switzerland (Schweitzer Hitparade)	1
UK Singles (OCC)	17
US Billboard Hot 100	24
US Cash Box	13
West Germany (Offizielle Deutsche Charts)	2

== Certifications ==
Region	Certification	Certified units/sales
Canada (Music Canada)	2× Platinum	200,000^{^}
Germany (BVMI)	Gold	500,000^{^}
United Kingdom (BPI)	Gold	500,000^{^}
United States (RIAA)	Gold	1,000,000^{^}
^{^} Shipments figures based on certification alone.

== "Stars on 45 Medley 2" ==
The success of the single in North America even resulted in Radio Records rush-releasing a second single for the US market. The last four minutes of the album version of the Beatles medley ("Stars on 45"/Good Day Sunshine"/"My Sweet Lord"/"Here Comes the Sun"/"While My Guitar Gently Weeps"/"Tax Man"/"A Hard Day's Night"/"Please Please Me"/"From Me to You"/"I Wanna Hold Your Hand"/"Stars on 45") was released under the title "Stars on 45 Medley 2", but peaked at No. 67 on the Billboard Hot 100. The second Beatles medley single was not released in the Netherlands or any other part of the world.

=== Formats and track listings ===
- US 7" single

Side one

"Medley II" - 5:11

All tracks written by John Lennon and Paul McCartney unless otherwise noted

- "Stars on 45" (Eggermont, Duiser)
- "Good Day Sunshine"
- "My Sweet Lord" (Harrison)
- "Here Comes the Sun" (Harrison)
- "While My Guitar Gently Weeps" (Harrison)
- "Tax Man" (Harrison)
- "A Hard Day's Night"
- "Please Please Me"
- "From Me to You"
- "I Wanna Hold Your Hand"
- "Stars on 45" (Eggermont, Duiser)

Side two

"Stars on 45 II" (Eggermont, Duiser) - 3:19

- South African 7" single

Side one

"Stars on 45 (Medley)" - 5:11

All tracks written by John Lennon and Paul McCartney unless otherwise noted

- "Stars on 45" (Eggermont, Duiser)
- "Good Day Sunshine"
- "My Sweet Lord" (Harrison)
- "Here Comes the Sun" (Harrison)
- "While My Guitar Gently Weeps" (Harrison)
- "Taxman" (Harrison)
- "A Hard Day's Night"
- "Please, Please Me"
- "From Me to You"
- "I Wanna Hold Your Hand"
- "Stars on 45" (Eggermont, Duiser)

Side two

"'45 Stars Get Ready" (7" version) (Eggermont, Duiser) - 3:12

== 1989 remix ==
The Beatles medley was remixed and re-released in a house music version in Europe in 1989 under the title "Stars on '89 Remix", then featuring an alternate selection of Beatles tracks taken from the album version of the medley, coupled with a new "Stars on 45" theme called "Rock the House". The single was remixed and reproduced by Danny van Passel and Rutti Kroese and released on the Red Bullet label as a 7", 12", and CD maxi singles, all formats backed with an extended version of the "Rock the House" theme.

=== Formats and track listings ===
- 7" single

Side one

"Stars on '89 Remix" (radio version) – 4:01

- "Rock the House" (van Passel, van Passel, Kroese)
- "Stars on 45" (Eggermont, Duiser)
- "Rock the House" (van Passel, van Passel, Kroese)
- "A Hard Day's Night" (Lennon–McCartney)
- "Nowhere Man" (Lennon–McCartney)
- "You're Going to Lose That Girl" (Lennon–McCartney)
- "No Reply" (Lennon–McCartney)
- "Rock the House" (van Passel, van Passel, Kroese)
- "Taxman" (Harrison)
- "Ticket to Ride" (Lennon–McCartney)
- "Drive My Car" (Lennon–McCartney)
- "Do You Want to Know a Secret" (Lennon–McCartney)
- "Rock the House" (van Passel, van Passel, Kroese)
- "We Can Work It Out" (Lennon–McCartney)
- "I Should Have Known Better" (Lennon–McCartney)
- "Rock the House" (van Passel, van Passel, Kroese)

Side two

"Stars on the House" (van Passel, van Passel, Kroese) – 3:40

- 12" single

Side one

"Stars on '89 Remix" (extended version) – 6:17

- "Rock the House" (van Passel, van Passel, Kroese)
- "Stars on 45" (Eggermont, Duiser)
- "Rock the House" (van Passel, van Passel, Kroese)
- "A Hard Day's Night" (Lennon–McCartney)
- "Please Please Me" (Lennon–McCartney)
- "From Me to You" (Lennon–McCartney)
- "Ticket to Ride" (Lennon–McCartney)
- "Drive My Car" (Lennon–McCartney)
- "Do You Want to Know a Secret" (Lennon–McCartney)
- "We Can Work It Out" (Lennon–McCartney)
- "I Should Have Known Better" (Lennon–McCartney)
- "Rock the House" (van Passel, van Passel, Kroese)
- "Nowhere Man" (Lennon–McCartney)
- "You're Going to Lose That Girl" (Lennon–McCartney)
- "No Reply" (Lennon–McCartney)
- "Rock the House" (van Passel, van Passel, Kroese)
- "Taxman" (Harrison)
- "Rock the House" (van Passel, van Passel, Kroese)
- "I Want to Hold Your Hand" (Lennon–McCartney)
- "Rock the House" (van Passel, van Passel, Kroese)

Side two

"Stars on the House" (super club mix) (van Passel, van Passel, Kroese) – 5:01

- CD maxi single

1. "Stars on '89 Remix" (radio version) – 4:04

- "Rock the House" (van Passel, van Passel, Kroese)
- "Stars on 45" (Eggermont, Duiser)
- "Rock the House" (van Passel, van Passel, Kroese)
- "A Hard Day's Night" (Lennon–McCartney)
- "Nowhere Man" (Lennon–McCartney)
- "You're Going to Lose That Girl" (Lennon–McCartney)
- "No Reply" (Lennon–McCartney)
- "Rock the House" (van Passel, van Passel, Kroese)
- "Taxman" (Harrison)
- "Ticket to Ride" (Lennon–McCartney)
- "Drive My Car" (Lennon–McCartney)
- "Do You Want to Know a Secret" (Lennon–McCartney)
- "Rock the House" (van Passel, van Passel, Kroese)
- "We Can Work It Out" (Lennon–McCartney)
- "I Should Have Known Better" (Lennon–McCartney)
- "Rock the House" (van Passel, van Passel, Kroese)

2. "Stars on '89 Remix" (extended version) – 6:12

- "Rock the House" (van Passel, van Passel, Kroese)
- "Stars on 45" (Eggermont, Duiser)
- "Rock the House" (van Passel, van Passel, Kroese)
- "A Hard Day's Night" (Lennon–McCartney)
- "Please Please Me" (Lennon–McCartney)
- "From Me to You" (Lennon–McCartney)
- "Ticket to Ride" (Lennon–McCartney)
- "Drive My Car" (Lennon–McCartney)
- "Do You Want to Know a Secret" (Lennon–McCartney)
- "We Can Work It Out" (Lennon–McCartney)
- "I Should Have Known Better" (Lennon–McCartney)
- "Rock the House" (van Passel, van Passel, Kroese)
- "Nowhere Man" (Lennon–McCartney)
- "You're Going to Lose That Girl" (Lennon–McCartney)
- "No Reply" (Lennon–McCartney)
- "Rock the House" (van Passel, van Passel, Kroese)
- "Taxman" (Harrison)
- "Rock the House" (van Passel, van Passel, Kroese)
- "I Want to Hold Your Hand" (Lennon–McCartney)
- "Rock the House" (van Passel, van Passel, Kroese)

3. "Stars on the House" (super club mix) (van Passel, van Passel, Kroese) – 4:57

== Other versions ==
- In 2006, the Global Deejays released an updated version of "Stars on 45", but the medleys were not included.
- In 2011, "Stars on 45" was given the house treatment, with the single released as "45". This version also leaves out the medleys.

== Parodies ==
A parody of "Stars on 45," entitled "Stars Over 45," was done by Chas & Dave. It was a hit in the UK, where it reached No. 21 in early 1982.

Scottish band Orange Juice, recorded a medley of their own songs, set to a rhythm similar to that of Stars On 45, for a radio session in 1981 for John Peel, called "Blokes On 45".

"Maoris on 45" (1982), a song inspired by the "Stars on 45" concept but instead featuring popular traditional Māori music set to guitar, was a hit in New Zealand.

"Weird Al" Yankovic has regularly included polka medleys of popular hits on most of his albums. The tradition began as a parody of "Stars on 45" (billed as "Polkas on 45") on Yankovic's second album "Weird Al" Yankovic in 3-D.

== See also ==
- List of Billboard Hot 100 number-one singles of 1981
- Barbra Streisand, 2010, with similar vocal part

== Bibliography ==
- Bronson, Fred. The Billboard Book of Number One Hits. New York. Billboard Books, 2003. ISBN 0-8230-7677-6

== Sources and external links ==
- Mawer, Sharon. Biography of Stars on 45/Starsound at AllMusic. Retrieved 2012-04025.
- Stars on 45 discography at Discogs
- Stars on 45 at Discogs (list of releases)
- Medley II at Discogs (list of releases)
- Stars on '89 Remix at Discogs (list of releases)
- Stars on 45 - "Medley" on YouTube
