= No Reply (song) =

Song by the Beatles

- West German picture sleeve

Song by the Beatles

from the album Beatles for Sale
- Released: 4 December 1964
- Recorded: 30 September 1964
- Studio: EMI, London
- Genre: Folk rock; pop
- Length: 2:15
- Label: Parlophone
- Songwriter: Lennon–McCartney
- Producer: George Martin

"No Reply" is a song by the English rock band the Beatles from their 1964 album Beatles for Sale. In North America, it was issued on Capitol Records' variant on the British release, Beatles '65. The song was written mainly by John Lennon and credited to Lennon–McCartney. Lennon originally gave the song to another artist managed by Brian Epstein, Tommy Quickly, in June 1964, but Quickly decided not to use it. The Beatles recorded the track in London soon after returning from their first full tour of the United States. The lyrics typify Lennon's more introspective and mature songwriting on the Beatles for Sale album.

== Background ==
John Lennon began writing "No Reply" in May 1964 while in Tahiti, where he was on holiday with his Beatles bandmate George Harrison and their respective partners, Cynthia Lennon and Pattie Boyd. Once back in London, Lennon finished writing the song with some assistance from Paul McCartney. On 3 June, after the Beatles had completed the recording for their album A Hard Day's Night, they taped a demo of the track at EMI Studios. In the description by author John Winn, the performance was lighthearted, with Lennon and McCartney joking as they sang. Ringo Starr had been hospitalised earlier that day and was therefore absent from the recording. Winn writes that the line-up on the demo was most likely Lennon on guitar, McCartney playing drums in place of Starr, and Harrison on bass.

The demo was then passed on to Tommy Quickly, a singer who was signed to NEMS, the agency owned by Beatles manager Brian Epstein. By late September, Lennon and McCartney were stuck for new material for the Beatles' new album, and since Quickly had not issued a recording of the song, the Beatles decided to reclaim "No Reply" and record it themselves. According to the liner notes for Beatles for Sale, the song was a candidate for the band's next single before it was supplanted by "I Feel Fine".

The song was not officially released as a single in the UK, but in several other countries it did get a release. In the Netherlands, it reached number one as a double A-side with "Rock and Roll Music".

== Composition ==
=== Lyrics ===
"No Reply" is about a young man who is unable to contact his apparently unfaithful girlfriend, although he knows she is home. In a 1980 interview, Lennon recalled that the lyrics were inspired by "Silhouettes", a 1957 song first recorded and released by doo-wop group the Rays. Lennon added: "I had that image of walking down the street and seeing her silhouetted in the window and not answering the phone …"

According to Lennon in a 1972 interview, the Beatles' music publisher, Dick James, was quite pleased with "No Reply": "I remember Dick James coming up to me after we did this one and saying, 'You're getting better now – that was a complete story.' Apparently, before that, he thought my songs wandered off."

=== Music ===
The song is in the key of C major. The song form is standard AABA (verse-verse-bridge-verse), without a chorus as such, but including the refrain "No reply". The main instrumentation on the Beatles recording comprises acoustic guitars (played by Lennon and Harrison on their Gibson J-160Es), bass guitar and drums. In addition to handclaps by all four members of the group, the overdubs included a piano part by their producer, George Martin, and electric guitar played by Harrison. The rhythm over the song's verses is partly bossa nova. The bridge, or middle sixteen, reverts to a standard rock rhythm.

Lennon had intended to sing the higher harmony part, as this was the original melody. However, his voice had deteriorated due to excessive use, forcing McCartney to sing the part, and relegating Lennon to the lower harmony line.

== Charts ==
Weekly chart performance for "No Reply”
Chart (1965)	Peak position
Netherlands (Dutch Top 40)	1

== Reception ==
In his book, Revolution in the Head, Ian MacDonald comments that the "double-tracked vocals generate a stunning power" in the song's "climactic middle sixteen", which is among the most exciting 30 seconds in the Beatles' catalogue. He describes the track as "an enticingly downbeat opener" for Beatles for Sale. McDonald adds that the group considered repeating the section, but "wisely" decided that "less-is-more".

In 2006, Mojo placed "No Reply" at number 63 on its list of "The 101 Greatest Beatles Songs". In his commentary on the track, Chris Hillman, a founding member of the American folk-rock band the Byrds, admired the imagery of the lyrics and the "funky, out of left-field" rhythms played by Lennon and Harrison. He added: "There is no rock blueprint for this … This is the stuff which got us all over here to put down the mandolins and banjos and plug in and pay attention to rock again."

== Cover versions ==
Parody band Beatallica recorded a mashup of "No Reply" and Metallica's "No Remorse" entitled "No Remorseful Reply", on their 2001 EP A Garage Dayz Nite.

== Personnel ==
According to Ian MacDonald:

The Beatles

- John Lennon – double-tracked lead vocal, acoustic guitar, handclaps
- Paul McCartney – harmony vocal, bass guitar, handclaps
- George Harrison – acoustic guitar, electric guitar, handclaps
- Ringo Starr – drums, handclaps

Additional personnel

- George Martin – producer, piano
- Norman Smith – engineer

== Sources ==
- Dowlding, William J. (1989). Beatlesongs. New York: Simon & Schuster.
- Everett, Walter (2001). The Beatles as Musicians: The Quarry Men through Rubber Soul. New York, NY: Oxford University Press. ISBN 0-19-514105-9.
- Hertsgaard, Mark (1996). A Day in the Life: The Music and Artistry of the Beatles. London: Pan Books. ISBN 0-330-33891-9.
- Kruth, John (2015). This Bird Has Flown: The Enduring Beauty of Rubber Soul Fifty Years On. Milwaukee, WI: Backbeat Books. ISBN 978-1-61713-573-6.
- Lewisohn, Mark (2005) [1988]. The Complete Beatles Recording Sessions: The Official Story of the Abbey Road Years 1962–1970. London: Bounty Books. ISBN 978-0-7537-2545-0.
- MacDonald, Ian (2005). Revolution in the Head: The Beatles' Records and the Sixties (2nd rev. edn). Chicago, IL: Chicago Review Press. ISBN 978-1-55652-733-3.
- Miles, Barry (2001). The Beatles Diary Volume 1: The Beatles Years. London: Omnibus Press. ISBN 0-7119-8308-9.
- Rowley, David (2002). Beatles For Sale. Edinburgh: Mainstream Publishing. ISBN 1-84018-567-8.
- Sheff, David (2000). All We Are Saying. St Martin's Griffin. ISBN 0-312-25464-4.
- Winn, John C. (2008). Way Beyond Compare: The Beatles' Recorded Legacy, Volume One, 1962–1965. New York, NY: Three Rivers Press. ISBN 978-0-307-45239-9.
