= The Star Sisters =

1980s Dutch pop trio

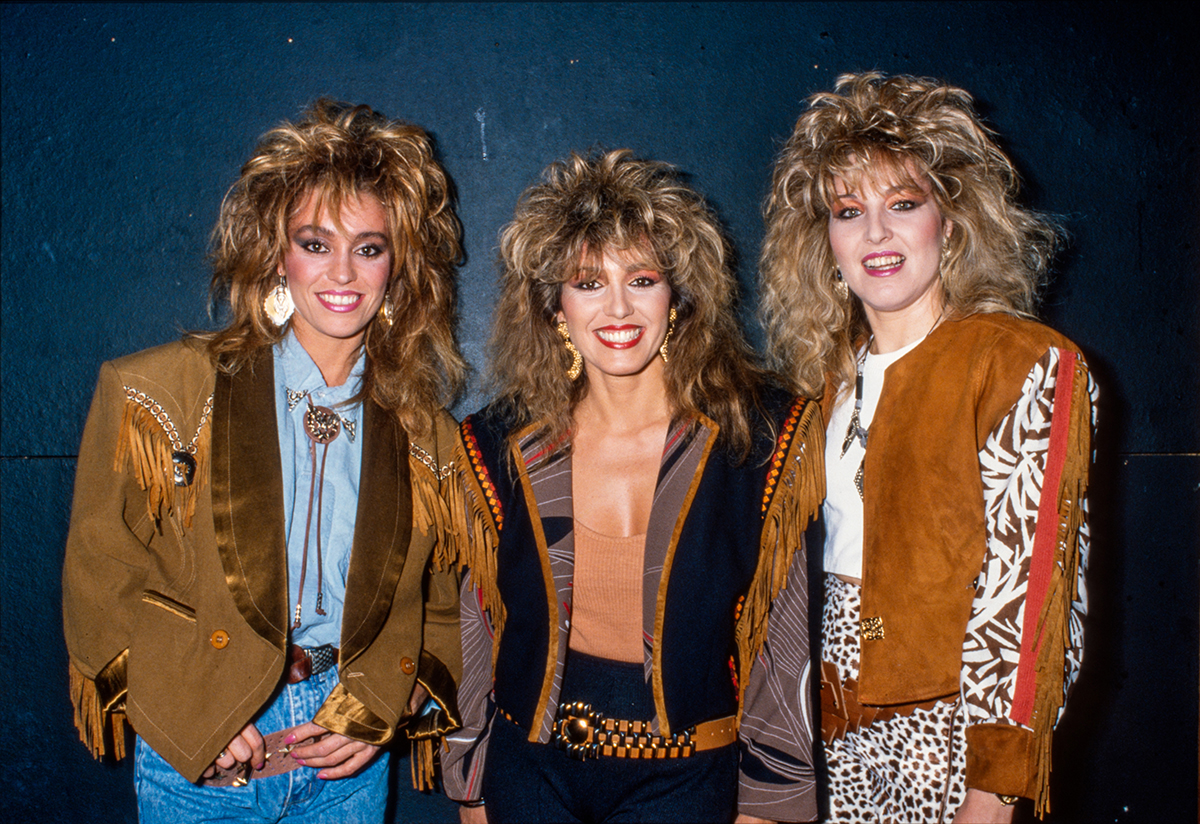
The Star Sisters in 1985

The Star Sisters were a female Dance/Pop trio from The Netherlands that were very popular during the 1980s, most notably as the ladies who performed the chorus as members of Jaap Eggermont's studio act Stars on 45 and in a spinoff in which they performed a medley of Andrews Sisters songs that charted in 1983. In 1984, they performed the ending theme for the Japanese film The Return of Godzilla. Between 1983 and 1987 the group released six singles in Europe, including their best known hits "Are You Ready For My Love" in 1986, "He's The 1 (I Love)" in 1985, and a cover of American singer Regina’s “Baby Love” in 1987.

The group consisted of Sylvana van Veen (born 1950), Patricia Paay (born April 7, 1949) and Yvonne Keeley (born September 6, 1952). Paay and Keeley are actually sisters.
