= Stars on 45 =

Dutch band (1980–1987)

- Origin: South Holland, Netherlands
- Genres: Pop; dance music
- Years active: 1980–1987
- Labels: CNR; Radio/Atlantic; CBS; Red Bullet
- Past members: Jody Pijper; Hans Vermeulen; Albert West
- Website: The Dutch Stars on 45 fansite

Stars on 45 was a Dutch pop act that was successful in Europe, the United States and Australia in the early 1980s. The group later shortened its name to Stars On in the U.S., while in the U.K. and Ireland, it was always known as Starsound (or Star Sound). The act, which consisted solely of studio session musicians under the direction of producer Jaap Eggermont, formerly of Golden Earring, recorded medley recordings made by recreating hit songs as faithfully as possible and joining them together with a common tempo and underlying drum track.

== History ==
Willem van Kooten, the managing director of the Dutch publishing company Red Bullet Productions, visited a record store and happened to hear a disco medley being played there. The medley combined original recordings of songs by the Beatles, the Buggles, the Archies and Madness with a number of recent American and British disco hits like Lipps Inc.'s "Funkytown", Heatwave's "Boogie Nights", and The S.O.S. Band's "Take Your Time (Do It Right)", as the rhythms of the various songs tended to complement and "dovetail" into each other.

When van Kooten heard that the medley also used a segment of "Venus", a 1970 US #1 hit by Dutch band Shocking Blue — a song for which he himself held the worldwide copyright — and knowing that neither he nor Red Bullet Productions had given the permission for the use of the recording, he realised that the medley in fact was a bootleg release.

The record turned out to be a 12-inch single called "Let's Do It in the 80's Great Hits", credited to a nonexistent band called Passion and issued on a nonexistent record label called Alto. The medley had its origin in Montreal, Canada, and it was later revealed that it was the work of one Michel Ali, together with two professional DJs, Michel Gendreau and Paul Richer. Gendreau and Richer both specialised in the art of "splicing", stringing together snippets of music from different genres, in varying keys and BPMs from different sound sources, at this time still predominantly from vinyl records. The first version of the medley was eight minutes long, and it included parts from some twenty tracks of which only three were by the Beatles: "No Reply", "I'll Be Back", and "Drive My Car". A later extended, 16-minute, 30-track mix of the same medley labeled "Bits and Pieces III" added another five Beatles titles: "Do You Want to Know a Secret", "We Can Work It Out", "I Should Have Known Better", "Nowhere Man", and "You're Gonna Lose That Girl".

=== First single personnel and recording ===
With the bootleg recording obviously already circulating in dance clubs on both sides of the Atlantic, van Kooten decided to "bootleg the bootleg" and create a licensed version of the medley by using soundalike artists to replicate the original hits and therefore contacted his friend and colleague Jaap Eggermont. The Beatles soundalikes were established Dutch singers. John Lennon's parts were sung by Bas Muys of the 1970s Dutch pop group Smyle. Paul McCartney's and George Harrison's parts were sung by Sandy Coast frontman Hans Vermeulen, and Okkie Huysdens, who had worked with Vermeulen in the band Rainbow Train. Apart from the recreated songs, an original chorus and hook written and composed by Eggermont and musical arranger Martin Duiser called "Stars on 45" was added at intervals to help string differing sections together. The '45' in the title refers to the playback speed of a vinyl record single — 45 rpm; such singles were often simply called "45s". The female vocals in the chorus were performed by session singer Jody Pijper. Later recordings also featured uncredited vocals by Dutch 1970s star Albert West and Arnie Treffers of the rock revival band Long Tall Ernie and the Shakers. The Stars on 45 recordings were made before the birth of digital recording technology, which meant that each song was recorded separately and the different parts were subsequently manually pieced together with a pre-recorded drumloop, using analog master tapes, in order to create the segued medleys. The specific drumloop heard on most Stars on 45 recordings is often referred to as the "clap track", due to its prominent and steady handclaps.

The first such release was an 11:30 12" single, issued in the aftermath of the so-called anti-disco backlash, and was released on the independent Dutch label CNR Records in the Netherlands in December 1980. The single was simply entitled "Stars on 45 Medley" by Stars on 45, with no credits on the label or the cover as to who actually sang on the recording. When Dutch radio stations began playing the four-minute, eight-track Beatles segment of the medley, placed in the middle of the original, 12" mix, an edited 7" single with the Beatles part preceded by "Venus" and The Archies' "Sugar, Sugar" was released and hit the #1 spot of the Dutch singles charts in February 1981. A few months later, it also reached #2 in the UK, where it was released by the British subsidiary of CBS Records and credited to 'Starsound'. There was speculation that the Beatles-medley was created to coincide with John Lennon's death a few weeks earlier, but the recordings were made well before Lennon's killing.

In June 1981, the single went to #1 in the US, where it was released by Radio Records, a sublabel of Atlantic Records. The track list for the 7" edit of the "Stars on 45 Medley" in the US was the names of all the songs that make up the medley as it appears on the actual record label:

- Medley: Intro "Venus"
- Sugar, Sugar
- No Reply
- I'll Be Back
- Drive My Car
- Do You Want to Know a Secret
- We Can Work It Out
- I Should Have Known Better
- Nowhere Man
- You're Going to Lose That Girl
- Stars on 45

This single with its 41-word title continues to hold the record for a #1 single with the longest name on the Billboard charts, due to the legalities requiring each song title be listed.

=== Follow-up releases and album ===
Shortly thereafter, Eggermont created the first Stars on 45 album, Long Play Album, issued with an equally anonymous album cover and featuring a 16-minute side-long medley of the Beatles titles. The Stars on 45 Long Play Album (US title: Stars on Long Play; UK title: Stars on 45 — The Album) also became a massive seller worldwide, topping both the UK and Australian album charts, it was a Top 10 hit in most parts of Europe and also reached #9 on Billboard's album chart in the US.

The original Dutch CNR Records edition of the first Stars on 45 album, Long Play Album.

The popularity of the album even resulted in it being given an official release in the Soviet Union, where it was issued by state-owned record label Melodiya under the title Discothèque Stars. The "Stars on 45 Medley" single was later awarded a platinum disc for one million copies sold in the US alone.

A second Beatles medley went to #67 on the US charts. Another album followed later that same year, Longplay Album – Volume II (US title: Stars on Long Play II; UK title: Stars on 45 — The Album — Volume 2), featuring medleys using the songs of ABBA, a #2 hit in the UK and Motown, a #55 hit in the US. The recordings of the "Stars on 45" medleys were also made before the advent of modern synthesizers with the possibility of sampling sounds. Consequently, for the recreation of tracks like the themes from "Star Wars" and "The War of the Worlds", included in the "Star Wars and Other Hits" medley on Longplay Album — Volume II and released as the third European single under the title "Volume III", a full symphony orchestra was used, including strings, brass, woodwind, harpsichord, orchestral percussion like timpani etc. — even if those particular parts were only ten or fifteen seconds long on the actual record released.

In late 1981, Eggermont and Martin Duiser were awarded the Conamus Export Prize in the Netherlands in recognition of their contributions to Dutch culture and economy.

A third album, The Superstars (US title: Stars on Long Play III; UK title: Stars Medley), featured medleys of the Rolling Stones and Stevie Wonder. The single "Stars on 45 III: A Tribute to Stevie Wonder" peaked at #28 in the US in 1982, where the act was now simply listed as Stars On. It also reached #14 in the UK, where it was called "Stars Medley" — confusingly, exactly the same title as the third album in the British Isles. In Continental Europe and most other parts of the world, the Stevie Wonder medley was entitled "Stars on Stevie". In late 1982, Eggermont and Duiser again won the Conamus Export Prize, this time together with Tony Sherman, who sang lead vocals on "Stars on Stevie".

=== Later inspirations ===
In 1982, there was a staged musical show at the Huntington Hartford Theater in Hollywood, California and a video of that show was released in 1983 by MCA Home Video.

A spinoff group called The Star Sisters had a hit in Europe in 1983 with an Andrews Sisters medley. The albums were released under the moniker of Stars on 45 Proudly Presents the Star Sisters.

1985 saw the release of an album titled Stars on 45 — Soul Revue and a single called "The Sam & Dave Medley" credited to 'Stars on 45 featuring Sam & Dave', and including the Stars on 45 logo on the album cover, but not produced by Jaap Eggermont. It featured David Prater and his new singing partner Sam Daniels. Original Sam & Dave member Sam Moore demanded that the album and single be recalled; they were later re-labelled and re-issued, but now credited to 'The New Sam & Dave Revue'.

Later releases included Stars on Frankie, released in October 1987; and some eleven years later, Stars on 45: The Club Hits, released in 1998; the latter, however, was not produced by Eggermont. While the three original Stars on 45 albums have been reissued on CD in their entirety or in their original form, several CD compilations on European budget labels such as Demon Music Group's subsidiary Music Club, Arcade, Edel Records, Falcon Neuen Media, Bunny Music, and ZYX Records have been released under the non-copyrighted 'Stars on 45' moniker all through the 1990s and 2000s (decade). These include The Best of Stars on 45, The Very Best of Stars of 45, The Magic of Stars on 45, Stars on 45 Presents the Mighty Megamix Album, Greatest Stars on 45, The Non-Stop Party Album!, Greatest Stars on 45 Vol. 1, and Greatest Stars on 45 Vol. 2. It should, however, be noted that some of these compilations also feature titles such as "Carpenters Medley", "Beach Boys Gold", "The Spencer Davis Group Medley", "Love Songs Are Forever", and the like—again, recordings that were neither produced by Jaap Eggermont nor originally released as by Stars on 45 in the 1980s. (See below.)

== Similar acts and parodies ==
=== Before Stars on 45 ===
In 1976, the Ritchie Family had scored their biggest U.S. hit with a similar medley named "The Best Disco in Town". This had incorporated various pop hits of the day, such as Silver Convention's "Fly, Robin, Fly" and Donna Summer's "Love to Love You Baby", recreated in an order, and segued by the title theme.

Four years before the release of the "Stars on 45", a similar medley named "Rockollection" was produced by the Frenchman Laurent Voulzy. Around the same time, Shalamar debuted with their single "Uptown Festival", featuring a medley of Motown hits from the 60's. Dutch band Veronica Unlimited scored a big hit in 1977 in the Benelux countries and at home with the disco medley "What Kind of Dance Is This". The band Café Crème played its "Unlimited Citations" (1977) by taking the original Beatles recordings, editing them into a sequence, overdubbing identical drum and bass parts, singing hit songs as faithfully as possible, and stringing them together, with a common tempo and relentless underlying drum track. The single, with its 45-word title, was a hit throughout Europe (including Netherlands) and North Africa. The band acted playback on TV but played the medley live in a different place every night over more than 500 nights (almost two years) in multiple countries.

=== After Stars on 45 (Volume 1) ===
The Top of the Pops chart of Thursday, 13 August 1981, had seven medleys in the Top 40 (by the Royal Philharmonic Orchestra, Tight Fit, Gidea Park, Lobo, Starsound, Startrax and Enigma) with "Stars on 45 (Volume 2)" and "Startrax Club Disco", a Bee Gees medley, jointly holding the number 27 slot in the chart. In late 1981, Pink Floyd singer and guitarist David Gilmour along with future Dream Academy frontman Nick Laird-Clowes formed a duo called Holly and the Ivy’s and released the UK Top 40 hit “Christmas on 45”.

Japanese backing vocal group Koorogi '73 recorded two songs that served as medleys for Toei Company’s tokusatsu series: Stars on Kamen Rider and Super Sentai Banbaraban; the latter also incorporated Android Kikaider, Daitetsujin 17 and Space Sheriff Gavan.

Beginning in the late 1980s, a British novelty group, Jive Bunny and the Mastermixers, had several hit singles using the same format as Stars on 45, only using primarily big band and 1950s-60s rock and roll songs. Initially, the group utilized remixes of original recordings by artists such as Bill Haley and His Comets, Little Richard and the Everly Brothers, but later used singer-impersonators in similar form to Stars on 45. Among their best known releases were "Swing the Mood" and "That's What I Like".

In the early 1990s, Tortuga Rebel had several hit singles in Latin America using the same model, including mostly Spanish-language rock songs from the 1950s and 1960s. Tortuga Rebel used remixes of recordings by Mexican groups. Albums include Tortuga Rebel — Todo el Rock n' Roll, Vamos al rock, and others in Spanish.

The wording "...on 45" has been used by others (often for comedic effect), including "Polkas on 45", a polka medleys of popular hits by "Weird Al" Yankovic; Scars on 45, a British indie rock band; War on 45, an EP by hardcore punk band D.O.A.; Star Turn on 45 (Pints), a British comedic novelty band; and "Maoris on 45", a novelty medley single by New Zealand group the Consorts. British pub rock duo Chas & Dave released Stars Over 45 in 1981, a medley of songs from World War 2 and the 1950s.

== Discography ==
- Long Play Album (1981)
- Longplay Album – Volume II (1981)
- The Superstars (1982)
- Stars on Frankie (1987)
- The Club Hits (1998)

== See also ==
- Stars on 54
