= CNR Music =

- Founded: 1937
- Founder: Cornelis Nicolaas Rood
- Country of origin: Netherlands
- Official website: cnrentertainment.nl

CNR is a Dutch audio and video label. It was founded in 1937 as CNR Records by Cornelis Nicolaas Rood, who made his fortune as a producer of lampshades and other lighting materials.

Rood regarded his record label merely as a hobby, but things changed for the better in the early 1950s when CNR bought distribution and marketing rights for several foreign pop and classical record companies. He also signed up several local artists.

One of CNR's first major successes was Dutch singer Gert Timmerman, who became one of the Dutch top selling male artists from the end of the 1950s. In the 1960s, CNR enjoyed major successes with artists like Trio Hellenique, Gert Timmerman (who was also part of a duo, Gert & Hermien) and Heintje, a Dutch teenage singer who sold millions of singles and albums in Europe between 1966 and the early 1970s.

By this time, CNR had grown into one of the Dutch major independent record labels. It mainly focussed on local talent such as André van Duin, Benny Neyman and Tol Hansse, but it also had hit singles with licensed international productions like Baccara's "Yes Sir, I Can Boogie" and "Sorry, I'm a Lady".

Local success continued well into the 1980s with artists including Stars on 45. CNR began distributing the up-and-coming Jive Records label in 1982. In the budding video market, CNR had a major presence with its CNR Video label, which specialised in kids material (Bassie & Adriaan).

In 1988 Rene Froger released his first top 10 hit ("Winter in America"), a Doug Ashdown cover on the CNR label. The singer would record two successful albums: Who Dares Wins (1988) and You're My Everything (1989). Both were certified with a golden award and his first number one hit in Dutch. The singer then signed to Dino Music and became the best selling Dutch musician of the early nineties.

In the early 1990s, CNR had become a subsidiary of Arcade Records, which was then a major compilation label in the Netherlands. However, Arcade was on the brink of bankruptcy and warned that all its signed artists could lose their recording contracts if the bankruptcy went ahead. Arcade survived, but CNR's output and success diminished drastically later in the decade.

It also underwent several management, licensing and name changes, including a joint venture with American rock label Roadrunner Records in 1998.

CNR is billed as CNR Entertainment, with the emphasis on local product, kids material, comedy and TV series. It has resurrected the Arcade compilation label and distributes several smaller labels. Until the end of 2012 it holds the distribution and marketing rights for Roadrunner acts such as Lenny Kravitz, Young the Giant, and Nickelback.

In August 2011, CNR announced a joint venture with the Dutch branch of Rough Trade to oversee the distribution of their material. The joint venture was launched as Tone Entertainment.
