= Jaap Eggermont =

Dutch record producer

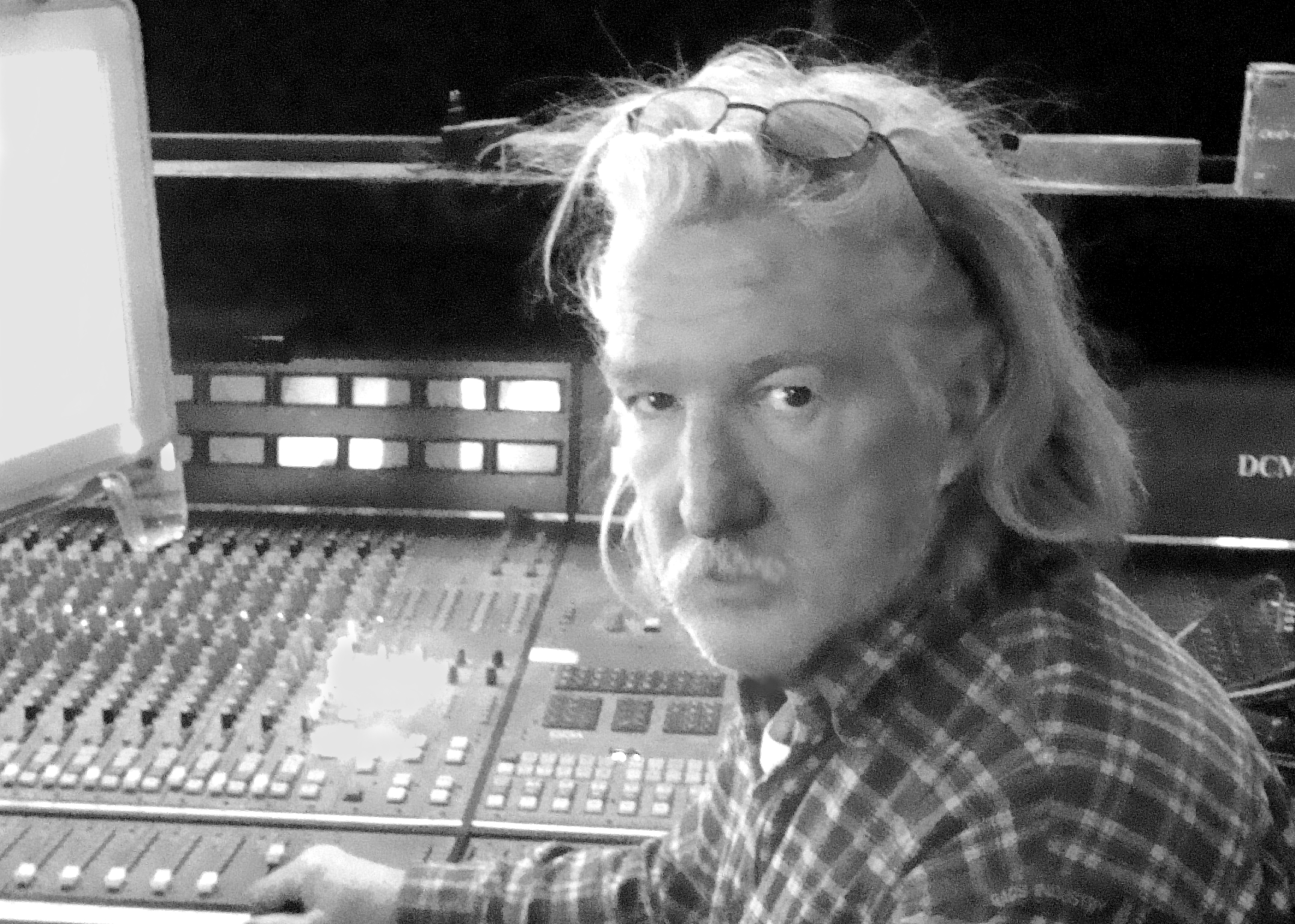
Jaap Eggermont

Jacobus Johannes "Jaap" Eggermont (born 31 October 1946, The Hague) is a Dutch record producer, best known for his Stars on 45 project.

Eggermont's first job in the musical profession was from 1965 until 1969 as the drummer of the band Golden Earrings. After leaving that band, which soon changed its name to Golden Earring, Eggermont became a record producer. He worked with such acts as Sandy Coast, Earth and Fire and Livin' Blues. The greatest success he had was in the early 1980s, with his project Stars on 45.
